= Gurjant Singh Budhsinghwala =

Sikh militant from India (1966–1992)

2nd Jathedar of Malwa Kesri Commando Force
- Preceded by: Waryam Singh Khappianwali
- Succeeded by: None (merged with Khalistan Liberation Force)

3rd Jathedar of Khalistan Liberation Force
- Preceded by: Avtar Singh Brahma
- Succeeded by: Navneet Singh Quadia

Personal details
- Born: 29 June 1966 Budhsinghwala, Punjab, India
- Died: 29 July 1992 (aged 26) Ludhiana, Punjab, India
- Known for: Insurgency in Punjab (1984–1992); Moga Massacre (1989) and an alleged role in 1991 Punjab Killings by Gurmeet Singh Pinki

Gurjant Singh Budhsinghwala (29 June 1966 – 29 July 1992) was a Sikh militant and the third Jathedar of the Khalistan Liberation Force. Budhsinghwala's organization, KLF, was one of the most active and main Sikh militant groups during the insurgency in Punjab, India. Budhsinghwala had KLF join the Sohan Singh Panthic Committee and partnered with Khalistan Commando Force (Panjwar), Babbar Khalsa, Bhindranwale Tiger Force (Sangha), and Sikh Student Federation (Bittu) in militant actions.

He has been accused of planning and carrying out attacks that killed over 1,000 people including some major acts such as the killing the police chief of Patiala district, Avinder Singh Brar and his junior, an assassination attempt on Beant Singh, an attack on chief of Punjab Police DGP Mangat, an attack on former chief of Punjab Police JF Riberio in Romania, an attack India's Home Minister Subodh Kant Sahay, killing Punjab's Deputy Chief Minister Balwant Singh, a role in the assassination of Rajiv Gandhi, along with various attacks on police, CRPF, NSG, BSF, and the Indian army and a massacre in Moga.

== Early life and family ==
Gurjant Singh was born in the village of Budhsinghwala in a Brar Jat Sikh family of, Faridkot district (modern day Moga district) on 29 June 1966. He had four siblings — one sister and three brothers. After allegedly being tortured by the police multiple times, he joined the KLF in 1986.

Another factor that contributed to his joining of KLF was the killing of 8 Sikh militants on 6 April 1984, at Bibi Kahan Kaur Gurdwara in Moga by CRPF, BSF, and Punjab Police. Among the dead was Budhsinghwala's grand uncle.

In June 1984, during Operation Blue Star, he was arrested from Gurdwara Singh Sabha in Moga. He was kept in jail for 2 years and was released after his case came to court.

== Early militancy ==
Budhsinghwala's first act was the killing Sarpanch Dhana Singh. Dhana was accused of being a police informant. Budhsinghwala along with his cousin Jaga Singh and older brother Kulwant Singh killed Dhana. Jaga and Kulwant were arrested and put in Faridkot jail over this incident. Gurjant was arrested but was given house arrest temporarily. He escaped during this period and according to his brother said farewell to his entire family.

=== Member of Malwa Kesri Commando Force ===
After fleeing from house arrest, he joined the Malwa Kesri Commando Force, a local militant group. It was under this group, that Budhsinghwala attacked home of a police informant. He was also accused of killing Additional District and Sessions Judge R. P. Gaind in Jalandhar.

=== Head of Malwa Kesri Commando Force ===
After Malwa Kesri Commando Force leader, Waryam Singh, was killed in a fake encounter Budhsinghwala was put in charge. It is said that after Budhsinghwala was proclaimed head of Malwa Kesari Commando Force he vowed to kill those who killed Waryam Singh.

Soon after, three involved in Waryama Singh's death were killed by Budhsinghwala using Sten Guns. One killed was the Sarpanch of Rode Joginder Singh who had given information that led to Waryam Singh's death. Sarpanch Joginder Singh with three of his aides were making their way to a bus stop. They met a few Sikhs who were dressed as farmers, but were actually members of the Malwa Kesri Commando Force. The militants told the Sarpanch and his aides to try and run, as they had come to get revenge. They ran. As they ran the militants opened fire, killing three, with one of the aides managing to flee.

Soon Malwa Kesri Commando Force merged with Khalistan Liberation Force.

== Lieutenant-General of Khalistan Liberation Force ==
Budhsinghwala's group, Malwa Kesri Commando Force, merged with Khalistan Liberation Force during its founding in late 1986 and he was soon after made Lieutenant-General of KLF by Avtar Singh Brahma.

As Lieutenant-General he would discuss each and every action of KLF before hand with fellow higher ups to see if it was morally just or not and if it fit Sikh values.

=== Killing of police officers ===
One of Budhsinghwala's first actions was in September 1987. The target was S.H.O. (Station house officer) Sub-Inspector Mith Singh. Mith Singh had been hand-picked by then chief of Punjab Police Julio F. Riberio. He was picked to deal with Budhsinghwala. Mith Singh had been accused of police brutality and targeting Budhsinghwala's family and father. Budhsinghwala began plotting to kill Mith Singh in revenge for his actions with Husan Singh and Babbar Khalsa members. The attack was carried out by Budshinghwala and fellow Sikh militants on 15 September 1987 at around 9 in the morning. Mith Singh was shot while he was walking along with his guard, a police constable. Both of their guns were taken by Budhsinghwala. In the crossfire a schoolboy was also killed and five others were injured. The killing is said to have greatly alarmed Riberio.

On 6 November 1987, Budhsinghwala killed Deputy Superintendent of Police Tara Chand. Chand was killed in the Jagraon area.

=== Killing SSP Avinder Singh Brar and SSP KRS Gill ===
One of Budhsinghwala's most major actions was the killing of Senior Superintendent of Police Avinder Singh Brar and Senior Superintendent of Police KRS Gill on 14 December 1987.

SSP Brar and his junior, SSP KRS Gill, were both shot dead while jogging at Patiala's National Institute of Sports. Both of them had little security. The three killers later fled on a motorcycle.

Brar and Gill were top officers. There killing was described as the biggest killing since that of AS Atwal in Punjab. It was also described as a big killer of police morale. Brar had been held as the best police officer. Brar had cleaned the Babbar Khalsa out of Patiala. According to Chief of Punjab Police at the time J.F Ribeiro Brar would have become the chief of police had he not been killed.

In 1988 KLF under Avtar Singh Brahma attacked and destroyed CRPF bases in retaliation for CRPF actions at Brahampur.

=== Various attacks ===
On 22 January 1988, BJP Punjab Vice-President Khushi Ram Sharma was shot dead with 4 bullets in Ludhiana by 2 Sikh on scooters. Budhsinghwala claimed responsibility in a letter on behalf of KLF.

On the same day 6 KLF members armed with AK-47s shot dead 12 people in a park in Barnala. Five others were injured. One of them was a Shiv Sena worker. Budhsinghwala claimed responsibility in a letter on behalf of KLF.

Budhsinghwala also led an attack on Gurcharan Singh Tohra and Professor Darshan Singh. Tohra was president of SGPC and Darshan was the SGPC appointed Jathedar of Akal Takht. During an April 1988 SGPC meeting at Ludhiana University KLF members under Budhsinghwala snuck their way in using fake ids. They attacked and fought Tohra and Darshan's security. 5 police officers and 8 members of Tohra and Darshan's party were killed. No KLF member was killed but Tohra and Darshan managed to escape unhurt. A motive for attacks on Tohra could be the belief of militants that Tohra was involved in Operation Blue Star.

On 19 June 1988, under Budhsinghwala's reign as Lieutenant-General of KLF a senior KLF leader with other members gunned down the head of the Punjab Shiv Sena, Ramkat Jalota. He was killed along with his gunmen and another. The Shiv Sena had allegedly used violence against Sikhs which made them targets of Sikh militants.

== Head of Khalistan Liberation Force ==
Following Avtar Singh's death in July 1988 Budhsinghwala commanded Khalistan Liberation Force. Budhsinghwala was responsible for multiple key assassinations of top cops, and politicians. They were killed in revenge for killings of other Khalistan Liberation Force members or in revenge for extrajudicial killings of other Sikhs.

=== Assassinations and attacks on security forces ===
Under Budhsinghwala KLF launched frequent attacks on the bases of security forces. A reason was retaliation for alleged crimes against Sikhs committed at Brahmpura by security forces notably by CRPF.

==== Attacks on security forces ====
Under Budhsinghwala Major Singh Johal, Anar Singh Para, and other KLF members attacked with grenades a Home Guard headquarters in Lakhna Kalan.

Under Budhsinghwala Major Singh Johal, and other KLF members attacked a CRPF base in Gandivind Saraa and destroyed it.

Under Budhsinghwala Major Singh Johal, and other KLF members attacked another CRPF base in Gandivind Saraa and destroyed it.

Under Budhsinghwala KLF members under Major Singh Johal and Deputy Chief of KLF Jarnail Singh had an encounter with troops from the Indian Army in Karoonwale. Deputy Chief Jarnail Singh would be killed along with other KLF members. Major Singh Johal would survive with a few others.

Under Budhsinghwala in Shabazpur Major Singh Johal with other KLF members blew up a CRPF base.

In Bhagwanpur, under Budhsinghwala, Major Singh Johal with other KLF members attacked a CRPF base.

In Ladhoo, under Budhsinghwala, Major Singh Johal with other KLF members had a battle with the Indian Army leading to 5 KLF members dying.

In Bhoora Kahon, under Budhsinghwala, Major Singh Johal, and Gurdeep Singh Vakeel with other KLF members attacked 2 BSF vehicles killing 9 BSF jawans and injuring 7. The vehicles were also destroyed.

KLF members under Budhsinghwala led by Major Singh Johal, and Gurdeep Singh Vakeel blew up 2 CRPF vehicles near the Chandian river.

In Sarhali Major Singh Johal with other KLF members, under Budhsinghwala, attacked a police station killing 5 CRPF men and injuring a Deputy Superintendent of Police.

In Thatti, under Budhsinghwala, Major Singh Johal with other KLF members attacked a drain killing 4 BSF jawans.

In Lahuka, under Budhsinghwala, Major Singh Johal with other KLF members blew up a police van with bombs.

In Dubli Major Singh Johal with other KLF members, under Budhsinghwala, attacked a CRPF checkpoint. 1 police jeep and 1 police bus were destroyed and 19 officers were killed, including a Deputy Superintendent of Police, with 1 injured.

In Kalia Sakthar Major Singh Johal with other KLF members, under Budhsinghwala, attacked a police station.

In Cheema Major Singh Johal and other KLF members attacked CRPF and commandos killing 5 and seriously injuring 6.

In Khemkaran Major Singh Johal with other KLF members, under Budhsinghwala, attacked the place killing 5 BSF jawans.

Major Singh Johal and other KLF members, under Budhsinghwala, attacked the station in Kachha Pakka. Johal attacked with Gurdeep Singh Vakeel and other prominent KLF members. They used pistols, grenades, and RPGs. 2 police buses were burn and 11 CRPF men were killed.

Major Singh Johal, Gurdeep Singh Vakeel, and other KLF members, under Budhsinghwala, attacked the CRPF headquarters in Kubaak with RPGs and grenades. 1 jeep was destroyed and 3 CRPF men were killed.

Major Singh Johal, and other KLF members, under Budhsinghwala, attacked a police station in Manochahal where Indian Army soldiers were stationed. 17 soldiers were killed.

Major Singh Johal, and other KLF members, under Budhsinghwala, killed 3 commandos at a checkpoint in Padhri Nake.

Major Singh Johal, and other KLF members attacked the BSF headquarters in Noorwala.

Under Budhsinghwala Major Singh Johal and other KLF members were involved in a battle with National Security Guards near Dubeepur, where 8 NSG were killed and 5 being injured.

In Amarko other KLF members attacked a CRPF patrol and killed 7 officers.

Under Budhsinghwala Major Singh Johal, and other KLF members killed 5 soldiers and injuring 5 more in Panjwar by attacking a convoy.

At Sri Hargobindpur Toofan Singh and 5 others attacked a police party on 1 November 1988. In the attack 1 Sergeant was wounded, and 1 Constable was also wounded.

In December 1988, near Sri Hargobindpur, Toofan Singh and others attack SHO (Station House Officer) Swaran Singh and officers with him. No one was hurt in the attack.

Budhsinghwala claimed responsibility for an attack on 2 CRPF jeeps near Sher Chowk on 25 July 1989. The government claimed 1 CRPF jawan was killed and 4 injured. Budhsinghwala claimed more were killed in the attack. Budhsinghwala also warned that more attacks would ensue if police did not stop committing fake encounters.

KLF claimed responsibility for an attack on a TV tower with RPGs on 30 March 1990, in Amritsar. The attack occurred in the night at 11. In the attack 7 CRPF soldiers were killed with 6 injured. It caused a loss of over 10,000,000 rupees. (Equivalent to $1,250,000 USD)

KLF claimed responsibility for attack a Police station in Dandkasle on 6 April 1990, killing 1 Constable.

Per court case, Khalistan Liberation Force members blew up a portion of police station at Sector 26 Chandigarh, India in July 1990.

On 21 September 1990, KCF, KLF, BKI, and SSF claimed responsibility for an attack on a SPO base which killed 2 officers.

==== Assassinations of officers ====
Budhsinghwala along with Sukhwinder Singh Sukhi, a KLF member, also killed Inspector R. Sodha.

KLF was held responsible for the killing of BSF Deputy Commandant Davinder Singh.

KLF was held responsible for the killing of BSF Assistant Commandant Lachman Singh.

In March 1989 under Budhsinghwala KLF members killed Thanedar (Assistant Sub-Inspector) Pargat Singh. Pargat had been accused of targeting the family of Sikhs. He was killed while having tea near a police station. Another officer was injured.

On 13 September 1989, S.S.P Gobind Ram's son was killed in an attempted attack on Gobind Ram by Budhsinghwala and other KLF members.

Commandant Gobind Ram was killed on 10 January 1990. Gobind Ram was killed in a bomb blast at the headquarters of the 75th battalion of the Punjab Armed Police in Jalandhar. He was commandant of the 75th battalion. The planning of the killing was done by Budhsinghwala while the killing was done Toofan Singh and others. The bomb was planted in the cooler of his office. In the blast, 3 others, including Sub Inspector Prem Kumar, were killed and at least 4 were critically wounded. The blast also caused major damage to the building. All the windows of the second floor were broken and a fire broke out on the first floor. Multiple vehicles parked were also damaged. Gobind Ram had been on the hit list of Sikhs over his role in fake encounters and torturing Sikhs.

On 16 February 1990, KCF, BTFK (Sangha), BKI, and SSF collectively claimed responsibility for an explosion in Phillaur that killed Inspector Harcharan Singh Soori and Assistant Sub-Inspector Ram Moorti on the 11th. The bomb also wounded 2 Sergeants. The explosion happened in an armoured and guarded police training facility. Both were put in a special armoured room for extra safety, but were killed at 9 pm from an explosion within their room. Both officers had been accused of torturing Sikhs. Inspector Soori had survived a previous assassination attempt in 1988.

On 2 March 1990, KCF, KLF, BKI, and SSF collectively claimed responsibility for killing 1 Sergeant and 1 Constable of Punjab Police in Nagoke for alleged "misdeeds".

On 2 March 1990, KCF, KLF, BKI, and SSF collectively claimed responsibility for a bomb attack in Philaur that killed 1 police constable and 2 others. They stated that they were killed because they had put fake cases on locals.

On 24 November 1990, at 9 am Budhsinghwala along with other militant groups part of the Sohan Singh Committee killed Superintendent of Police (Operations) Harjit Singh in a bomb blast at Tarn Taran. Sikh militants had been studying Harjit's travel routes for some time. A remote-controlled bomb had been placed on a road Harjit usually drove by to go to the doctor. When Harjit's lead security vehicles drove by and it was just his vehicle over the bomb it was detonated. In the explosion three of his security guards were killed and his vehicle was destroyed. A permanent curfew was put on the town after. A saying about the incident is, "He had a security vehicle in front of him and behind him, so he would be safe from all sides. But he didn’t count on his death coming from below". Twenty-two days prior to his death Harjit had killed the chief of BTFK (S) Sukhwinder Singh Sangha along with four other militants. KLF, KCF, Babbar Khalsa, SSF, and BTFK (S) members held a meeting afterward pledging to kill Harjit within 31 days of Sangha's death. Major Singh of KCF was given the lead role in the killing.

On 27 December 1990, D.S.P. of Patiala Sujit Singh along with his wife and two guards were killed by Budhsinghwala.

Budhsinghwala also injured Chief of Punjab Police, D.G.P. (Director General of Police) D.S Mangat in a bomb blast in 1991. The blast injured three of his security guards with his chief security officer losing a foot.

On 9 October 1991, Superintendent of Police (Headquarters) Joginder Singh Kherawas killed by KLF and BTFK. Khera was ambushed in Ropar. Khera was one of the leading officers in the Punjab Police force. He was killed with nine commandos.

On 1 April 1992, Superintendent of Police (Operations) of Ludhiana R.S Tiwana was killed by Budhsinghwala in a remote-controlled bomb blast. His daughter and two others were also killed in the blast.

On 28 September 1990, KCF, KLF, BKI, and SSF claimed responsibility for killing Inspector Rajinderpal Singh.

=== Killing of police informants ===
On 16 March 1990, KLF, SSF, BKI, and KCF claimed responsibility for killing a police informant named Bhagwant Singh who was involved in over 50 killings. He was also a key associate of Gobind Ram.

On 6 April. 1990, KLF claimed responsibility for killing Amrik Singh Jaura, a Nihang, and his gunmen near Tarn Taran for their involvement in killing militant Sukhdev Singh Sakhira. He was chief of a faction of Buddha Dal after Santa Singh's excommunication.

On 23 November 1990, KCF, KLF, BKI, BTFK, and SSF claimed responsibility for killing Congress president of Jalandhar district, Gurdarshan Singh. They claimed he was a police informant involved in the killing of militants.

=== Assassination of politicians ===
On 5 May 1989, Budhsinghwala and fellow KLF militants killed Congress leader and MLA Sat Pal Parashar. He had recently been elected to Ludhiana North Constituency.

On 14 May 1990, Gurcharan Singh Tohra, president of SGPC, was attacked in his car. A jeep with about six militants drove beside Tohra's vehicle and opened fire. An escort car attempted to chase them but they escaped. Tohra managed to survive but was injured. Tohra's bodyguard was also injured. Tohra's driver was killed and so was former MLA H.S. Rajla who was accompanying Tohra. Budhsinghwala, Paramjit Singh Panjwar of Khalistan Commando Force, Sukhdev Singh Babbar of Babbar Khalsa, and Daljit Singh of the All India Sikh Student Federation collectively claimed responsibility. They said he was attacked for his involvement in Operation Blue Star.

On 11 July 1990, Budhsinghwala killed former Punjab Finance Minister and Deputy Chief Minister Balwant Singh. Balwant was killed in a car while travelling on a busy road in Chandigarh. Balwant was a key player in the creation of the Rajiv-Longowal Accord. The accord had been opposed by Sikh militants.

Budhsinghwala killed vice-president of the Punjab Congress party Lala Bhagwan Das along with his bodyguards.

On 23 November 1990, KCF, KLF, BKI, BTFK, and SSF claimed responsibility for killing Congress president of Jalandhar district, Gurdarshan Singh. They claimed he was a police informant involved in the killing of militants.

Under Budhsinghwala in January 1992 two KLF members killed Sher Singh, president of All India Youth Akali Dal, at Aroorgarh.

==== Attack on Suboht Kant Sahay ====
On 7 June 1991, BTFK (Sangha), KLF, KCF (Panjwar), and SSF claimed responsibility for an assassination attempt on India's Home Minister Subodh Kant Sahay in Ludhiana. The militants made a bomb attack on his convoy. Sahay's bulletproof vehicle flipped over, but he escaped with minor wounds. His driver and 1 bodyguard were seriously wounded.

=== Assassination of Rajiv Gandhi ===
On 21 May 1991, former Prime Minister Rajiv Gandhi was assassinated by a suicide bomber which also killed 15 others and injured 43 others. The bomber, Kalaivani Rajaratnam, approached and greeted Gandhi. She then bent down to touch his feet and detonated an RDX explosive-laden belt tucked below her dress at exactly 10:10 PM. Some key people among the dead excluding Rajiv Gandhi was the bomber Kalaivani Rajaratnam, K. S. Mohammed Iqbal who was a SP, Munuswamy who was former member of the Tamil Nadu Legislative Council, and Santhani Begum the head of Mahila Congress. The main plot of the assassination was done by LTTE. Budhsinghwala was involved in the plot to assassinate Rajiv Gandhi and helped with planning, logistical support, and tactical support.

=== Attack on RSS ===
On the morning of 25 June 1989 KLF and BTFK members attacked Rashtriya Swayamsevak Sangh (RSS) members at their meeting at Nehru Park in Moga. 21 RSS members were killed with a police officer, a paramilitary home guard and a couple dying of a bomb blast after the shooting leaving a total of 25 dead and 31-35 injured. It has since been renamed to Shahidi Park meaning Martyr Park. According to police Sikhs opened fire with automatic weapons from a van killing 21 and injuring many. According to survivors bullets were sprayed on everyone. They then left the scene. Soon after a powerful bomb blast occurred which killed 4, injured more, and caused damage. A second bomb also blew up after, but it caused no damage or injuries. A curfew was announced immediately following the incident.

Home Minister Buta Singh described the incident as, "a very serious attempt on the part of terrorists to whip up tension along communal lines."

=== Various other actions ===
In a meeting with top KLF leaders, including Budhsinghwala and Navroop Singh, in Sri Hargobindpur Toofan Singh took responsibility for an explosion at a liquor store in Batala. 15 people were killed, 50 were injured, 4 shops were blown up, and 1 van was blown up in the explosion.

On 3 August 1989, under Budhsinghwala Kulwant Singh, a senior KLF member, and another killed Charan Das. Das was the head of a heterodox Dalit Sikh group and had been accused of blasphemy of Guru Granth Sahib.

Three days later on 16 September 1989, Manish Karma, son of SP Des Raj, would be kidnapped by Budhsinghwala to secure the release of Khalistan Liberation Force members. Manishu was let go in exchange for the release of Budhsinghwala's allies 3 or 4 days after being captured.

On 23 July 1990, KLF, KCF, BKI, and SSF collectively claimed responsibility for killing the Chief Engineer of the SYL, ML Sekhri, and Superintending Engineer of the SYL, Avtar Singh. They were killed while attending a meeting with fellow engineers in Chandigarh.

On 9 October 1991, Budhsignhwala along with Bhindranwale Tiger Force, Khalistan Commando Force, and the Sikh Students Federation kidnapped Romanian charge d’affaires Lividu Radu. Radu was taken from his car at around 8 am. He was forced into the vehicle of Budhsinghwala and co by 4 Sikhs who were armed. Quickly after the kidnapping, many raids were launched by security forces. Exit routes from Delhi were blocked and authorities in Uttar Pradesh and Haryana were warned of the situation. The kidnappers demanded the release of the killers of General Vaidya. Two of whom were Harjinder Singh Jinda, and Sukhdev Singh Sukha.The kidnappers threatened to kill Radu if their demands weren't met by 19 October. The deadline passed, but Sikh militants did not harm Radu. The Indian government refused to meet any of the Sikh's demands. Radu was kept in Delhi until 27 October. He was then moved to Punjab by car. On 25 November Radu was released unharmed after 48 days.

On 26 October 1991, R. N. Goyal, Chief Health Officers Ludhiana, Bachitar Singh Director Health Services Punjab, and 5 others were killed by KCF, KLF, BTFK, BKI, and SSF. They claimed that the doctors had discriminated against Sikhs, and aided the police in extrajudicial killings.

=== Wanted for ===
Budhsinghwala was responsible for the killings of over 1,000 people including key police officers and politicians.

== Death ==
Budhsinghwala was killed in a police encounter on 29 July 1992, in Ludhiana, when he and other members of KLF were meeting. The firefight took several hours. Police stated that Singh was killed in the house where a meeting was taking place, while some witnesses claim that he was killed in an alleyway 50 metres (160 ft) away from the house. His body was not returned to his family and was secretly cremated as police feared that his body might be used as a propaganda tool. At the time of his death, he was wanted in 37 cases of assassination.

There was a 2.5 million rupee bounty on Gurjant Singh at his time of death.

A two-day general strike was started in Chandigarh by all Akali Dal factions to protest against the killing of Budhsinghwala. According to police it had, "…paralysed life in six districts."

After Budhsinghwala's death, Pritam Singh Sekhon succeeded him as head of the KLF.
