= 2016–17 targeted killings in Punjab, India =

Assassinations of political and religious leaders in Punjab, India

Targeted killings in Punjab
- Location: Punjab, India
- Date: 18 January 2016 – 30 October 2017
- Target: 2 RSS leaders 3 Shiv Sena leaders 1 Hindu Sangharsh Sena leader 1 Christian pastor 1 Namdhari leader 2 Dera Sacha Sauda members 1 Sri Hindu Takht leader
- Attack type: Assassination; Terrorist incident
- Deaths: 9; 1 RSS leader 2 Shiv Sena leaders 1 Hindu Sangharsh Sena leader 1 Christian Pastor killed 2 Dera Sacha Sauda followers killed 1 Namdhari leader killed 1 Sri Hindu Takhr leader
- Perpetrator: Khalistan Liberation Force
- Defender: Punjab Police

During the years of 2016 and 2017, multiple attacks on political activists and mostly Hindu religious leaders in the northern Indian state of Punjab were perpetrated by individuals who were allegedly affiliated with the Sikh militant group Khalistan Liberation Force which is a designated terrorist group by India. Those culpable for the attacks were also arrested. The Pakistani agency ISI was allegedly held responsible by India for financing and aiding the militant acts to foment religious disturbances in the state.

== Attacks ==
- 18 January 2016 - Two motorcycle-borne persons wearing monkey caps fired gun shots at new Kidwai Nagar Park in Ludhiana city. The place was to host a Rashtriya Swayamsevak Sangh shakha (assembly) later in the day. No one was injured in the firing as the venue was vacant at the time of attack.
- 18 January 2016 - Rashtriya Swayamsevak Sangh (RSS) leader Naresh Kumar shot at and injured by masked motorcycle-borne men at Kidwai Nagar's Shaheedi Park in Ludhiana city.
- 3 February 2016 - Amit Arora, Shiv Sena leader, was attacked by two motorcycle-borne persons while he was sitting in his car in Ludhiana.
- April 3 2016 - Chand Kaur was shot dead by two unidentified men on motorcycles near Ludhiana. She was the wife of former Namdhari leader Satguru Jagjit Singh. (This was the only attack not done by KLF).
- 23 April 2016 - Durga Prasad Gupta shot dead by two motorcycle-borne assassins in Khanna city. He was the President of Mazdoor Sena, labour wing of Shiv Sena Punjab. Dashmesh Regiment claims responsibility for the killing. According to the NIA the killing was done by the Khalistan Liberation Force like the other killings.
- 6 August 2016 - Rashtriya Swayamsevak Sangh state Vice President Brigadier (retd) Jagdish Gagneja was shot at by motorcycle-borne persons in Chandigarh. He was admitted to hospital and died on 22 September from the injuries he sustained. Dashmesh Regiment, sent emails to media claiming responsibility for the killings.
- 14 January 2017 - Amit Sharma, religious preacher and president of Hindu Takht and political activist of Indian National Congress killed in Ludhiana city by two motorcycle-borne assassins.
- 25 February 2017 - Dera Sacha Sauda followers Satpal Kumar and his son Ramesh Kumar killed at a naam charcha ghar (prayer hall) in Jagera village near Malaudh by two shooters on a motorcycle. Satpal was also a Shiv Sena leader.
- 15 July 2017 - Sultan Masih, a pastor at Temple of God church in Ludhiana city, was shot dead by motorcycle-borne assassins who fired multiple shots killing him on the spot.
- 17 October 2017 - RSS and Bharatiya Janata Party leader Ravinder Gosai was shot dead in Ludhiana by two motorcycle-borne assassins. He was the RSS regional leader of Ludhiana.
- 30 October 2017 - Vipan Sharma, leader of Hindu Sangharsh Sena, was shot dead in Amritsar city by two masked men. One of the shooter, Saraj Singh Sandhu, was arrested by police on 6 March 2018. (This attack was not done by KLF.)

== Accused ==
Some of the key accused in the attacks were:

- Khalistan Liberation Force leader Harminder Singh Nihang (alias Mintoo) was named as involved in the killings by the National Investigation Agency. He had been in jail since 2014 and later died in jail of a heart attack on April 18, 2018.
- Khalistan Liberation Force future leader Harmeet Singh (alias Happy PhD) was the mastermind behind the killings. He was wanted by Indian authorities and Interpol who issued a Red Corner notice against Harmeet. He was later murdered in Pakistan in 2020.
- Jagtar Singh Johal (alias Jaggi), from Rama Mandi in Jalandhar, was arrested on 4 November 2017 by the Punjab Police, who accused him of the attacks. Jaggi is a non-resident Indian residing in Dumbarton and allegedly ran a website named 'Never Forget 1984'. He is accused of radicalising people and providing weapons to carry out the attacks.
- Hardeep Singh (alias Harman, alias Shera) accused on 12 November 2017 of being one of the shooters in the assassinations, was arrested by police after a massive manhunt. He was accused of being involved in 6 killings and 2 attempted killings. In his first 2 attacks he missed his shot. After he trained and became "perfect" in shooting. After each kill he would flee the country.
- Ramandeep Singh (alias Bagga, alias Canadian) was accused of being the second shooter in the killings.
- Gursharanbir Singh, a British national, described as the mastermind of the attacks has been declared a proclaimed offender. He is one of the accused in the murder of Rulda Singh, president of the Rashtriya Sikh Sangat, in 2009. The Crown Prosecution Service in the UK has stated that the evidence presented by the Indian authorities is "not sufficient to make out a case to answer".

== See also ==
- Indo-Canadian organized crime
- Insurgency in Punjab
- Khalistan movement
- List of terrorist incidents in Punjab, India
- Organised crime in India
