= Khalistan Liberation Force =

Sikh-Punjabi militant group

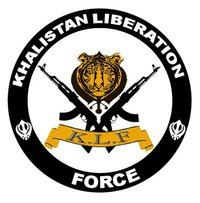
- Logo of the Khalistan Liberation Force
- Founder: Aroor Singh
- Leaders: Aroor Singh (executed) (1986–1987); Avtar Singh Brahma † (1987–1988); Gurjant Singh Budhsinghwala † (1988–1992); Navroop Singh Dhotian † (1992); Navneet Singh Khadian † (1992–1994); Dr. Pritam Singh Sekhon † (1994–1998); Harminder Singh Nihang (2008–2018); Harmeet Singh X (2014–2020); Avtar Singh Khanda (2020–2023)
- Dates active: 1986 – present
- Country: India
- Ideology: Separatism
- Status: Active

The Khalistan Liberation Force (KLF) is a pro-Khalistan militant organisation operating in the Punjab state of India, with prominent members based in Canada, the United Kingdom and Pakistan. Its objective is the creation of a sovereign Sikh state of Khalistan through armed struggle. It is responsible for numerous attacks including assassinations, bombings, mass murder, and abductions. It is also listed as a designated terrorist group by India.

== History ==
The KLF was responsible for several bombings of military targets in India during the 1980s and 1990s, sometimes in conjunction with Kashmir separatists.

KLF was among the Sikh groups that claimed responsibility for the 1991 abduction of the Romanian chargé d'affaires in New Delhi, Liviu Radu. This appeared to be retaliation for Romanian arrests of KLF members suspected of the attempted assassination of Julio Francis Ribeiro, 62, the Indian ambassador to Romania, in Bucharest. Radu was released unharmed after Sikh politicians criticized the action.

In the year 1991, Khalistan Liberation Force along with Bhindranwale Tiger Force of Khalistan and Dr. Sohan Singh (Head of Panthic Committee) etc. participated in the secret peace negotiations with India in the city of Ludhiana. These meetings were initiated by Union Minister of State for Home Subodh Kant Sahay on the orders of the (then) Prime Minister of India Chandra Shekhar. It is said that this peace effort was sabotaged by Pakistan's Inter Services Intelligence. Former Indian Intelligence Bureau Joint Director, Maloy Krishna Dhar stated in a press report published by The Hindu that "Prime Minister Benazir Bhutto and her ISI advisers were determined not to let peace succeed. Pakistan's covert war in Jammu and Kashmir had exploded in 1990, and its establishment understood that the Punjab conflict tied down our troops, and threatened our logistical lines into Jammu and Kashmir." The KLF was listed in 1995 one of the 4 "major militant groups" in the Khalistan movement.

India, in the 1995 era, alleged that Pakistan provided Sikh militants with shelter and support. The separatist movement was largely crushed in the mid-1990s.

In 1999 it was reported that former KLF operative Manjinder Singh Issi, who took part in the Radu kidnapping, became disillusioned with KLF when he realized that its Pakistani supporters were more interested in disruptive violence in Punjab than Sikh autonomy. Arrests still occur as of 2023.

== Presence ==
Based on the information acquired from the interrogation of three pro-Khalistan militants arrested on 4 August 2014 revealed that Funding of the organisation comes from the United Kingdom, Malaysia, Spain and Canada.

=== Factions ===
The Khalistan Liberation Army (KLA) is reputed to have been a wing of, or possibly associated with, or a breakaway group from, the KLF.

=== Ban ===
On 26 December 2018 the Ministry of Home Affairs of Government of India, issued a notification to proscribe the Khalistan Liberation Force as a banned organisation under the Unlawful Activities (Prevention) Act (UAPA).

== Leadership ==
The KLF organisation (Jathebandi) was founded by Aroor Singh and Sukhvinder Singh Babbar in 1986. Other KLF leaders who headed KLF after Aroor Singh were Avtar Singh Brahma (killed by Punjab police 22 July 1988), Gurjant Singh Budhsinghwala (Killed by Indian security forces on 29 July 1992), Navroop Singh (killed by Punjab police on 4 August 1992), and Navneet Singh Khadian (killed 25 Feb 1994). After Navneet Singh Kadian's death, command of the KLF passed to Dr. Pritam Singh Sekhon.

Following Sekhon's death in 1999, the organization remained a leaderless group, presumed dead, though small activities occurred under its name, heading into the 21st century. This organization was regrouped in 2008 under the leadership of Harminder Singh Nihang after the occurrence of many "Anti-Sikh" incidents in the Punjab state by Dera Sacha Sauda. Harminder Singh Nihang remained as the leader until his death in April 2018 at Patiala jail due to heart attack. Harmeet Singh PHD became acting Jathedar in 2014 after Harminder Singh was arrested and became the official Jathedar. He succeeded Harminder Singh until his murder in the beginning of 2020. After Harmeet Singh’s murder Avtar Singh Khanda a UK resident took over KLF. His father was a slain KLF member. Khanda would go by the name Ranjodh Singh. Khanda would die of a suspected poisoning on 14 June 2023.

S. No.	Name	Portrait	Term Start	Term End
1	Aroor Singh		1986	1987
2	Avtar Singh Brahma		1987	22 July 1988
3	Gurjant Singh Budhsinghwala		22 July 1988	29 July 1992
4	Navroop Singh Dhotian		29 July 1992	4 August 1992
5	Navneet Singh Khadian		4 August 1992	28 February 1994
6	Pritam Singh Sekhon		28 February 1994	March 1999
7	Harminder Singh Nihang		2 February 2008	18 April 2018
8	Harmeet Singh PhD		2014 (Acting) April 2018 (Official)	April 2018 (Acting) 27 January 2020 (Official)
9	Avtar Singh Khanda (alias Ranjodh Singh)		28 January 2020	14 June 2023

== History ==
=== 1980s ===
1. On 12 January 1987, Avtar Singh Brahma, Pipal Singh Toofan, Anar Singh Para and multiple other KLF members were involved in multiple encounters with the Central Reserve Police Force (CRPF). The encounters were described as long bloody, and fierce. The Kharkus killed multiple CRPF men and blew up multiple vehicle and then escaped. One of Brahma's targets in the attack, a police Inspector who had killed Dalbir Singh Billa Vapral a Kharku, was killed by Brahma's group along with 7 other officers. Following this the Kharkus led by Brahma killed multiple CRPF soldiers in other attacks throughout the day.
2. On 15 January 1987, Avtar Singh Brahma’s planned assassination of Lieutenant Colonel Sant Singh Bhullar was conducted. Bhullar attacked a Gurdwara in Sri Muktsar Sahib as part of Operation Blue Star. 10 KLF members had broken into Bhullar’s home and killed him in a burst fire. Three others were injured. They left behind a note from Avtar Singh Brahma claiming responsibility.
3. In January 1987 Avtar Singh Brahma and fellow militants fired at CRPF and challenged them to capture him for 20 minutes at Brahampura. The CRPF did not attempt to capture him and waited for reinforcements. Once reinforcements arrived an hour later they smashed and searched many homes in the village. They were also accused of committing other atrocities and faced heavy criticism from many leaders.
4. Avtar Singh Brahma claimed responsibility for killing Pahar Singh and his wife. Pahar was a KLF Lieutenant General. Brahma claimed that they had broken KLF’s rules and began to kill innocents as well as extorting people.
5. KLF launched an attack in September 1987. The target was S.H.O. (Station house officer) Sub-Inspector Mith Singh. Mith Singh had been hand-picked by then chief of Punjab Police Julio F. Riberio. He was picked to deal with Budhsinghwala. Mith Singh had been accused of police brutality and targeting. The attack was carried out by Budhsinghwala and fellow Sikh militants on 15 September 1987 at around 9 in the morning. Mith Singh was shot while he was walking along with his guard, a police constable. Both of their guns were taken by Budhsinghwala. In the crossfire a schoolboy was also killed and 5 others were injured. The killing is said to have greatly alarmed Punjab Chief of Police Riberio. Mith Singh was one of his best and most loyal officers.
6. On 1 November 1987, Avtar Singh Brahma claimed responsibility for the killing of 2 CRPF jawans in an ambush the day before near Kabirpur.
7. On 6 November 1987, KLF killed D.S.P (Deputy Superintendent of Police) Tara Chand. Chand was killed in the Jagraon area.
8. On 12 December 1987, KLF attacked and killed 9 police personnel in Punjab.
9. On 12 February 1987, KLF conducted Punjab's biggest robbery ever with cooperation with All India Sikh Student Federation and Babar Khalsa International.
10. One of Budhsinghwala's most major actions was the killing of Senior Superintendent of Police Avinder Singh Brar and Senior Superintendent of Police KRS Gill on 14 December 1987. SSP Brar and his junior, SSP KRS Gill, were both killed while jogging at Patiala's National Institute of Sports. Both of them had little security. Two men in tracksuits approached them at 7 a.m. They signaled to a third person who pulled out an AK-47. Brar was killed instantly by a bullet hitting his temple, "sending his skull flying". Gill attempted to flee to a police jeep, but was injured with bullets in his head and back. He would die while fleeing and fell on the ground face first. The three killers fled on a motorcycle. Brar and Gill were top officers. There killing was described as the biggest killing since that of AS Atwal in Punjab. It was also described as a big killer of police morale. Brar had been held as the best police officer. Brar had cleaned the Babbar Khalsa out of Patiala. According to Chief of Punjab Police at the time J.F Ribeiro Brar would have become the chief of police had he not been killed.
11. In 1988 Avtar Singh Brahma and fellow militants attacked and destroyed CRPF bases in retaliation for CRPF actions at Brahampur.
12. On 22 January 1988 BJP Punjab Vice-President Khushi Ram Sharma was shot dead with 4 bullets in Ludhiana by 2 Sikh on scooters. Budhsinghwala claimed responsibility in a letter on behalf of KLF.
13. On the same day 6 KLF members armed with AK-47s shot dead 12 people in a park in Barnala. 5 others were injured. One of them was a Shiv Sena worker. Budhsinghwala claimed responsibility in a letter on behalf of KLF.
14. In April 1988 KLF led an attack on Gurcharan Singh Tohra and Professor Darshan Singh. Tohra was president of SGPC and Darshan was the SGPC appointed Jathedar of Akal Takht. The attack was led by Gurjant Singh Budhsinghwala. At a SGPC meeting at Ludhiana University KLF members under Budhsinghwala snuck their way in using fake ids. They attacked and fought Tohra and Darshan’s security. 5 police officers and 8 members of Tohra and Darshan’s party were killed. No KLF member was killed but Tohra and Darshan managed to escape unhurt. A motive for attacks on Tohra could be the belief of militants that Tohra was involved in Operation Blue Star.
15. At Sri Hargobindpur Toofan Singh and 5 others attacked a police party on 1 November 1988. In the attack 1 Sergeant was wounded, and 1 Constable was also wounded.
16. In December 1988, near Sri Hargobindpur, Toofan Singh and others attack SHO (Station House Officer) Swaran Singh and officers with him. No one was hurt in the attack.
17. On 19 June 1988 under Budhsinghwala’s reign as Lieutenant-General of KLF a senior KLF leader with other members gunned down the head of the Punjab Shiv Sena, Ramkat Jalota. He was killed along with his gunmen and another. The Shiv Sena had used violence against Sikhs which made them targets of Sikh militants.
18. Avtar Singh Brahma was killed on 22 July 1988. He was killed in an encounter near the Pakistan border. One source has described his death as happening in, "mysterious circumstances..." Another says that before Avtar Singh's death he, "scamper[ed] through the verdant fields of Punjab's border district on horseback." His death caused outrage among rural Sikh as he was quite popular amongst them. Avtar Singh had become known as a Robin Hood figure. He is said to have commanded respect until the end. Avtar Singh was succeeded by Gurjant Singh Budhsinghwala one of Avtar Singh's lieutenant generals.
19. In March 1989 under Budhsibghwala KLF members killed Thanedar (Assistant Sub-Inspector) Pargat Singh. Pargat had been accused of targeting the family and of militants. He was killed while having tea near a police station. Another officer was injured.
20. On 25 June 1989, Gurjant Singh Budhsinghwala, head of KLF, along with Kulwant Singh and other KLF members attacked a Rashtriya Swayamsevak Sangh (RSS) meeting at Nehru Park in Moga. 21 RSS members were killed with a police officer, a paramilitary home guard and a couple dying of a bomb blast after the shooting leaving a total of 25 dead and 31-35 injured. It has since been renamed to Shahidi Park meaning Martyr Park. According to police Sikhs opened fire with automatic weapons from a van killing 21 and injuring many more before fleeing. Soon after a powerful bomb blast occurred which killed 4, injured more, and caused damage. A second bomb also blew up after, but it caused no damage or injuries. A curfew was announced immediately following the incident. Home Minister Buta Singh described the incident as, "a very serious attempt on the part of terrorists to whip up tension along communal lines."
21. Budhsinghwala claimed responsibility for an attack on 2 CRPF jeeps near Sher Chowk on 25 July 1989. The government claimed 1 CRPF jawan was killed and 4 injured. Budhsinghwala claimed more were killed in the attack. Budhsinghwala also warned that more attacks would ensue if police did not stop committing fake encounters.
22. On 3 August 1989, under Gurjant Singh Budhsinghwala Kulwant Singh, a senior KLF member, and another killed Charan Das. Das was the head of a heterodox Dalit religious group. He had been accused of blasphemy of Guru Granth Sahib. He was chopped into pieces by the KLF members.
23. On 13 September 1989, S.S.P Gobind Ram's son was killed in an attempted attack on Gobind Ram by Budhsinghwala and other KLF members.
24. On 16 September 1989, Manish Kumar, son of S.P Des Raj, would be kidnapped by Budhsinghwala. His reasoning was that he wanted police officers to go through the pain of losing a child as so many Sikh had in fake encounters. Though the real reason was for the release of Khalistan Liberation Force members. Manish was let go in exchange for the release of Budhsinghwala’s allies. Manish was treated well while he was captured. He said that he was given sweets and was told stories of the Sikh Gurus. On the day of his release he was dressed in new clothes and was given 11 rupees.
25. On 19 October 1989, Babbar Khalsa, KLF, and SSF collectively claimed responsibility for killing 1 Black Cat(NSG) near Manihal in Punjab.
26. On 19 October 1989, Babbar Khalsa, KLF, and SSF collectively claimed responsibility for killing 1 Black Cat(NSG) near Barwal.
27. On 19 October 1989, Babbar Khalsa, KLF, and SSF collectively claimed responsibility for killing a CID constable named Buta Singh.
28. On 19 October 1989, Babbar Khalsa, KLF, and SSF collectively claimed responsibility for a shop owner named Moti Lal, near Bhakhiwind, for unprovoked fire on Sikh militants.
29. On 16 November 1989, Toofan Singh, Sukhdev Singh Babbar, and other Kharkus of BKI and KLF claimed responsibility for killing a Congress Politician's gunman, a police sergeant, near Batala for killing Babbar Khalsa member Gurnam Singh in a false encounter.
30. On 16 November 1989, Toofan Singh, Sukhdev Singh Babbar, and other Kharkus of BKI and KLF claimed responsibility for attacking two police stations near Jhanda.
31. Major Singh Johal, Anar Singh Para, and other KLF members attacked with grenades and captured a Home Guard headquarters in Lakhna Kalan. The base would be permanently closed.
32. Major Singh Johal, and other KLF members attacked a CRPF base in Gandivind.
33. KLF members under Major Singh Johal and Deputy Chief Jarnail Singh had an encounter with troops from the Indian Army in Karoonwale. Deputy Chief Jarnail Singh would be killed along with other KLF members. Major Singh Johal would survive with a few other.
34. In Shabazpur Major Singh Johal with other KLF members blew up a CRPF base.
35. In Bhagwanpur Major Singh Johal with other KLF members attacked a CRPF base.
36. In Ladhoo Major Singh Johal with other KLF members blew up a CRPF base.
37. Anar Singh Para attacked a CRPF outpost in Swajpur.
38. In Pura Kona KLF members destroyed security force vehicles killing 9 officers and injuring 1.
39. In Para KLF members blew up a CRPF vehicle killing a Deputy Superintendent of Police.
40. In Sarhali an outpost was blown up with RPGs by KLF members.
41. In Tatti KLF members blew up 2 security forces' vehicles.
42. In Amarkot, in an attack, 6 officers were injured and a Special Police Officer was killed by KLF.
43. In Sudharani 5 officers were killed and 2 vehicles were blown up by KLF.
44. In Bhoora Kahon Major Singh Johal, and Gurdeep Singh Vakeel with other KLF members attacked 2 BSF vehicles killing 9 BSF jawans and injuring 7. The vehicles were also destroyed.
45. In Sarhali Major Singh Johal with other KLF members attacked a police station killing 5 CRPF men and injuring a Deputy Superintendent of Police.
46. In Thatti Major Singh Johal with other KLF members attacked a drain killing 4 BSF jawans.
47. In Lahuka Major Singh Johal with other KLF members blew up a police van with bombs.
48. In Dubli Major Singh Johal with other KLF members attacked a CRPF checkpoint. 1 police jeep and 1 police bus were destroyed and 19 officers were killed, including a Deputy Superintendent of Police, with 1 injured.
49. In Kalia Sakthar Major Singh Johal with other KLF members attacked a police station.
50. In Khemkaran Major Singh Johal with other KLF members attacked the place killing 5 BSF jawans.
51. Major Singh Johal and other KLF members attacked the station in Kachha Pakka. Johal attacked with Gurdeep Singh Vakeel and other prominent KLF members. They used pistols, grenades, and RPGs. 2 police buses were burn and 11 CRPF men were killed.
52. In Amarkot 7 CRPF men were killed and 6 wounded by an attack by Anar Singh Para of KLF.
53. KLF members under Brahma and Para further blew up a BSF outpost in Kacha Pakka.
54. Major Singh Johal, Gurdeep Singh Vakeel, and other KLF members attacked the CRPF headquarters in Kubaak with RPGs and grenades. 1 jeep was destroyed and 3 CRPF men were killed.
55. Major Singh Johal, and other KLF members attacked a police station in Manochahal where Indian Army soldiers were stationed. 9 soldiers were killed.
56. Major Singh Johal, and other KLF members killed 3 Commandos in Padhri Nake.
57. Major Singh Johal, and other KLF members attacked the BSF headquarters in Noorwala.
58. KLF members under Budhsinghwala led by Major Singh Johal, and Gurdeep Singh Vakeel blew up 2 CRPF vehicles near the Chandian river.
59. KLF killed Magistrate Goyal Moga after he and his guards surrendered
60. KLF killed Vice-president of the Punjab Congress party, minister of the Darbara Singh Administration, and MLA, Lala Bhagwan Das along with his bodyguards.
61. KLF was held responsible for the killing of BSF Deputy Commandant Davinder Singh.
62. KLF was held responsible for the killing of BSF Assistant Commandant Lachman Singh.
63. KLF Deputy Chief Toofan Singh killed a thief named Hari Singh and also killed another Balwinder Singh Billa who looted dead bodies near Sri Hargobindpur.
64. KLF Deputy Chief Toofan Singh killed one Dr. Vir Singh of Cheem Khudi who would extorted people posing as a member of Khalistan Liberation Force.
65. KLF Deputy Chief Toofan Singh killed looters in Buttar Mahira and returned the 50,000 rupees they robbed to civilians.
66. KLF Deputy Chief Toofan Singh killed looters in Gagoval and returned the cycle they robbed to the owner.
67. KLF Deputy Chief Toofan Singh killed 6 Black Cat commandos in Dand Manesh.
68. KLF Deputy Chief Toofan Singh once saved 3 kidnapped Hindus of Cheema.
69. KLF Deputy Chief Toofan Singh returned a stolen scooter, tape recorder, and other items to a doctor near Dhariwal.
70. KLF Deputy Chief Toofan Singh returned 32,000 rupees robbed of one Shiv Singh in Cheema Kudhhi.

=== 1990s ===
1. Commandant Gobind Ram was killed on 10 January 1990. Gobind Ram was killed in a bomb blast at the headquarters of the 75th battalion of the Punjab Armed Police in Jalandhar. He was commandant of the 75th battalion. According to an informant Gobind Ram's body had to be swept off the floor. The planning of the killing was done by Budhsinghwala while the killing was done Toofan Singh and others. The bomb was planted in the cooler of his office. In the blast, 3 others, including Sub Inspector Prem Kumar, were killed and at least 4 were critically wounded. The blast also caused major damage to the building. All the windows of the second floor were broken and a fire broke out on the first floor. Multiple vehicles parked were also damaged. Gobind Ram was known as the "butcher". He was known involved in 38 extrajudicial executions. He had been on the hit list of Sikhs over his role in fake encounters. He had also beat and tortured the wives of Sikhs. He was also known for forcing people to drink urine calling it "Gobind Ram's amrit".
2. In a meeting with top KLF leaders, including Budhsinghwala and Navroop Singh, in Sri Hargobindpur Toofan Singh took responsibility for an explosion at a liquor store in Batala. 15 people were killed, 50 were injured, 4 shops were blown up, and 1 van was blown up in the explosion.
3. On 31 January 1990, KLF, BKI, KCF, and SSF collectively claimed responsibility for killing Punjab BJP secretary Gurbachan Singh Patanga. In a press note they said that the BJP were greater enemies of the Sikhs than Congress and for this reason Patanga was killed.
4. On 31 January 1990, KLF General Pipal Singh claimed responsibility for killing 2 looters involved in multiple robberies near Chakkareka.
5. On 12 February 1990, KLF claimed responsibility for setting up a checkpoint near Panjwar which led to an encounter with BSF. In the encounter 2 BSF vehicles were destroyed, 5 BSF men were killed, and 6 injured.
6. On 2 March 1990, KCF, KLF, BKI, and SSF collectively claimed responsibility for killing 1 Sergeant and 1 Constable of Punjab Police in Nagoke for alleged "misdeeds".
7. On 2 March 1990, KCF, KLF, BKI, and SSF collectively claimed responsibility for a bomb attack in Philaur that killed 1 police constable and 2 others. They stated that they were killed because they had put fake cases on locals.
8. On 16 March 1990, KLF, SSF, BKI, and KCF claimed responsibility for killing a police informant named Bhagwant Singh who was involved in over 50 killings. He was also a key associate of Gobind Ram.
9. Sukhwinder Singh Sukhi, a KLF member, along with head of KLF Gurjant Singh Budhsinghwala killed police inspector R. Sodha.
10. KLF claimed responsibility for an attack on a TV tower with RPGs on 30 March 1990, in Amritsar. The attack occurred in the night at 11. In the attack 7 CRPF soldiers were killed with 6 injured. It caused a loss of over 10,000,000 rupees. (Equivalent to US$1,250,000)
11. KLF claimed responsibility for attack a Police station in Dandkasle on 6 April 1990, killing 1 Constable.
12. Per court case, Khalistan Liberation Force members blew up a portion of police station at Sector 26 Chandigarh, India in July 1990. Per persecution case, Gurcharanjit Singh, Doulat Singh, Gurvinder Singh along with Satwinder Singh and Balwant Singh of the Chandigarh Police executed this action.
13. On 6 April 1990, KLF claimed responsibility for killing Amrik Singh Jaura, a Nihang, and his gunmen near Tarn Taran for their involvement in killing militant Sukhdev Singh Sakhira. He was chief of a faction of Buddha Dal after Santa Singh's excommunication.
14. On 14 May 1990, Gurcharan Singh Tohra, president of SGPC, was attacked in his car. A jeep with about 6 militnats drove beside Tohra's vehicle and opened fire. An escort car attempted to chase them but they escaped. Tohra managed to survive but was injured. Tohra's bodyguard was also injured. Tohra's driver was killed and so was former MLA H.S. Rajla who was accompanying Tohra. Budhsinghwala, Paramjit Singh Panjwar of Khalistan Commando Force, Sukhdev Singh Babbar of Babbar Khalsa, and Daljit Singh of the All India Sikh Student Federation collectively claimed responsibility. They said he was attacked for his involvement in Operation Blue Star.
15. On 11 July 1990, Budhsinghwala killed former Punjab Finance Minister Balwant Singh. Balwant was killed in a car while travelling on a busy road in Chandigarh. Balwant was a key player in the creation of the Rajiv-Longowal Accord. The accord had been opposed by many Sikh leaders and militants. Balwant had been dubbed a traitor for his involvement in the accord.
16. On 23 July 1990, KLF, KCF, BKI, and SSF collectively claimed responsibility for killing the Chief Engineer of the SYL, ML Sekhri, and Superintending Engineer of the SYL, Avtar Singh. They were killed while attending a meeting with fellow engineers in Chandigarh.
17. On 21 September 1990, KCF, KLF, BKI, and SSF claimed responsibility for an attack on a SPO base which killed 2 officers.
18. On 21 September 1990, KCF, KLF, BKI, and SSF claimed responsibility for killing a Nirankari in Patiala.
19. On 28 September 1990, KCF, KLF, BKI, and SSF claimed responsibility for killing Inspector Rajinderpal Singh.
20. On 23 November 1990, KCF, KLF, BKI, BTFK, and SSF claimed responsibility for killing Congress president of Jalandhar district, Gurdarshan Singh. They claimed he was a police informant involved in the killing of militants.
21. On 24 November 1990, at 9 am Budhsinghwala along with other militant groups part of the Sohan Singh Committee killed Superintendent of Police (Operations) Harjit Singh in a bomb blast at Tarn Taran. Sikh militants had been studying Harjit's travel routes for some time. A remote-controlled bomb had been placed on a road Harjit usually drove by to go to the doctor. When Harjit's lead security vehicles drove by and it was just his vehicle over the bomb it was detonated. In the explosion three of his security guards were killed and his vehicle was destroyed. Harjit's limbs were found over 100 meters away from the location of the explosion. A permanent curfew was put on the town after. A saying about the incident is, "He had a security vehicle in front of him and behind him, so he would be safe from all sides. But he didn’t count on his death coming from below". Twenty-two days prior to his death Harjit had killed the chief of BTFK (S) Sukhwinder Singh Sangha along with four other militants. KLF, KCF, Babbar Khalsa, SSF, and BTFK (S) members held a meeting afterward pledging to kill Harjit within 31 days of Sangha's death. Major Singh of KCF was given the lead role in the killing. A famous kavishri ballad about this incident says, "24 November at exactly 9, for Sangha’s revenge Major Singh and his allies have arrived. Without wasting any time Kharkus have come to kill him… The 5 jathebandis [Groups] had said we would hit him hard… To become SSP he had done many misdeeds… Watch how with a computer system [remote-controlled bomb] Kharkus blow him up. Harjit’s wife watches his limbs blow up… Operation Shera has been done on the SP of Operation."
22. 27 December 1990, D.S.P. of Patiala Sujit Singh along with his wife and 2 guards were killed by Budhsinghwala.
23. Khalistan Liberation Force attacked and killed 8 RPF (Railway Protection Force) men at Butari railway station in India. As per police, Surjit Singh alias Satta Kaleke, Gursewak Singh alias Fauji and other KLF members also took away 16 rifles of the securitymen.
24. 5 KLF members fought 300 CRPF and police. The 5 militants were killed with over 6 security forces being killed and over 12 being injured.
25. Gurjant Singh Budhsinghwala, head of KLF, injured Chief of Punjab Police, D.G.P. (Director General of Police) D.S Mangat in a bomb blast in 1991. The blast injured three of his security guards as well with his chief security officer losing a foot.
26. On 7 June 1991, BTFK (Sangha), KLF, KCF (Panjwar), and SSF claimed responsibility for an assassination attempt on India's Home Minister Subodh Kant Sahay in Ludhiana. Kharkus made a bomb attack on his convoy. Sahay’s bulletproof vehicle flipped over, but he escaped with minor wounds. His driver and 1 bodyguard were seriously wounded.
27. On 9 October 1991, Superintendent of Police (Headquarters) Joginder Singh Kherawas killed by KLF and BTFK. Khera was ambushed in Ropar. Khera was one of the leading officers in the Punjab Police force. He was killed with nine commandos.
28. On 9 October 1991, KLF along with Bhindranwale Tiger Force, Khalistan Commando Force, and the Sikh Students Federation kidnapped Romanian charge d’affaires Lividu Radu. Radu was taken from his car at around 8 am. He was forced into the vehicle of Budhsinghwala and co by 4 Sikhs who were armed. Quickly after the kidnapping, many raids were launched by security forces. Exit routes from Delhi were blocked and authorities in Uttar Pradesh and Haryana were warned of the situation. The kidnappers demanded the release of the killers of General Vaidya. Two of whom were Harjinder Singh Jinda, and Sukhdev Singh Sukha.The kidnappers threatened to cut Radu in pieces if their demands weren't met by 19 October. The deadline passed, but Sikh militants did not harm Radu. The Indian government refused to meet any of the Sikhs demands. Radu was kept in Delhi until 27 October. He was then moved to Punjab by car. On 25 November Radu was released unharmed after 48 days.
29. On 26 October 1991, R.N. Goyal, Chief Health Officers Ludhiana, Bachitar Singh Director Health Services Punjab, and 5 others were killed by KCF, KLF, BTFK, BKI, and SSF. They claimed that the doctors had forged autopsy’s, improperly treated Sikhs, and aided in police killings.
30. On 25 January 1992, two KLF members killed Sher Singh, the president of All India Youth Akali Dal, at Aroorgarh.
31. On 1 April 1992, Superintendent of Police (Operations) of Ludhiana R.S Tiwana was killed by Budhsinghwala in a remote-controlled bomb blast. Tiwana had left his home is his ambassador car with a security vehicle. The bomb was blown right under Tiwana's car. Tiwana's limbs were found 500 yards away. His daughter and two others were also killed in the blast.
32. On 29 July 1992, Punjab Police killed chief of Khalistan Liberation Force Gurjant Singh Budhsinghwala in Ludhiana, Punjab. On 4 August 1992, Indian police claimed to have killed Khalistan Liberation Force's new chief Navroop Singh Dhotian and four other members in a 20-hour gun battle but later on 29 August 1992 declared that Mr Navrup Singh Dhotian is still alive.
33. As per Indian Government's request, Daya Singh Lahoria of the Khalistan Liberation Front was extradited from the U.S. to India to face court cases. Lahoria's trial took approximately five years but at the end he was acquitted of the charges because his complicity could not be proved.
34. Bail applications of two Khalistan Liberation force members were rejected by an Indian court.
35. On 28 October 1998, Indian Police arrested two Khalistan Liberation Force members.
36. Punjab Police claimed that two Khalistan Liberation Force militants Manjinder Singh Issi alias Bhushan alias Pappu alias Variety and Sukhjinder Singh alias Lali on 2 March had surrendered to the police in India.
37. Punjab Police claimed to have arrested 3 KLF militants on 20 August 1999 and also claimed to have captured a large quantity of ammunition from Jagtar Singh alias Raju of Deluana village in Mansa district; Ram Singh of Karandi in the Tohana police station area of Fatehabad district in Haryana; and Jasbir Singh alias Jassa of Manki village near Malerkotla town in Sangrur district in Punjab.
38. Devender Pal Singh, a militant belonging to Khalistan Liberation Force was sentenced to death by an Indian court.
39. Indian police claimed to have arrested a KLF member from a village in Punjab.
40. India got a KLF militant Jasbir Singh alias Seera extradited from Canada under India-Canada Extradition Treaty and charged him with new sedition cases after he raised pro-Khalistan slogans in Indian courts.

=== 2000s ===
1. On 2 February 2008, KLF launched an attack on the head of Dera Sacha Sauda Ram Rahim. Ram Rahim escaped unhurt, but 11 followers were injured with 2 seriously injured.
2. On 5 November 2008, an FIR named Harmeet Singh, a KLF member who would later become the chief of KLF, as receiving weapons, and ammunition to kill Ram Rahim. 3 men believed to be connected to Harmeet were arrested with 5 AK-56, 11 pistols, 900 cartridges, 2.5 million fake rupees and 25-kg heroin.
3. On 28 July 2009, KLF assassinated Rashtriya Sikh Sangat (A wing of Rashtriya Swayamsevak Sangh) President Rulda Singh.
4. On 28 July 2009, KLF assassinated Dera Sacha Sauda, Srisa Manager Lilly Kumar in Ludhiana. Kumar was shot by 4 KLF members on motorcycles. Kumar was involved in clashes with Sikh.
5. On 31 October 2009, KLF assassinated 1984 Anti-Sikh Riots main accused Dr. Budh Parkash Kashyap on the 25th anniversary of the riots. A masked man entered Kashyap's clinic and stabbed him twice in the head and chest. Kahsyap was checking a patient when he was attacked.

=== 2010s ===
1. KLF chief Harminder Singh Nihang visited Europe for 13 months beginning in June, 2013, to establish sleeper cells.
2. On 7 November 2014, Harminder Singh Nihang, KLF chief, was arrested at Indira Gandhi International Airport in Delhi.
3. On 13 April 2015, KLF shot Shiv Sena Punjab secretary Harvinder Soni in the stomach at 8:30 am in Fish Park. Soni managed to survive the attack. Soni had been on the hit-list of militants since 2012 when he was accused of assaulting Sikh youth.
4. In July 2015 Khalistan Liberation Force mailed letters seven Shiv Sena leaders including Sanjeev Ghanauli, Rajeev Tandon, Rakesh Arora, Amit Arora, Rubal Sandhu, Sachin Ghanauli and Rajesh Palta that gave a last warning for them to leave Punjab.
5. On 3 August 2015, president of the Punjab wing of Akhil Bharatiya Hindu Suraksha Samiti, Manish Sood, was killed. He was shot dead by his guard. Hindu leaders claimed KLF paid the guard to kill Sood. They claimed Sood had been receiving death threats from KLF after he attempted to attack Jagtar Singh Hawara while Hawara was heading to court. Sood had previously pulled down posters showing Jarnail Singh Bhindranwale. Police denied KLF being involved. Akhil Bharatiya Hindu Suraksha Samiti, Bajrang Dal and Shiv Sena and certain BJP leaders and members made a call for bandh and shops to be closed in Sirhind to protest the killing.
6. Between February 2016 and October 2017 KLF was involved in eight attacks after which the Indian agencies cracked down on its operatives. KLF in its attacks had targeted Hindu right wing leaders, a Christian pastor and prominent followers of the Dera Sacha Sauda. NIA reported that these attacks were made on the instructions of Pakistani ISI and had the objective to create communal unrest in the Indian Punjab. By destabilizing the law and order in the state, KLF had hoped to revive the Sikh [movement]. The NIA had stated in its charge sheet that "The leadership of KLF believes that it can revive the moribund Khalistan movement by targeting members of specific communities, so as to polarise society in Punjab on communal lines. Organisations and persons who, according to the leadership of the KLF, oppose the ideology of the late Jarnail Singh Bhindranwale are their prime targets for elimination."
7. On 18 January 2016, two men on a motorcycle fired gun shots at new Kidwai Nagar Park in Ludhiana city. The place was to host a Rashtriya Swayamsevak Sangh assembly later in the day. No one was injured in the firing as the venue was vacant at the time of attack.
8. On the same day Rashtriya Swayamsevak Sangh (RSS) leader Naresh Kumar shot at and injured by masked men on a motorcycle at Kidwai Nagar's Shaheedi Park in Ludhiana city.
9. One 3 February 2016 Amit Arora, a Shiv Sena leader, was attacked by two people on motorcycles while he was sitting in his car in Ludhiana.
10. On 16 February 2016 a Shiv Sena leader, Deepak Jalandhari, was shot at and injured by attackers on a motorcycle in Jalandhar.
11. On 3 April 2018, Chand Kaur was shot dead by two unidentified men on motorcycles near Ludhiana. She was the wife of former Namdhari leader Satguru Jagjit Singh. KLF was suspected to have killed Chand Kaur although government agencies alleged internal rivals as the killer.
12. On 24 April 2016 Durga Prasad Gupta was shot dead by two assassins on motorcycles Khanna. He was the President of Mazdoor Sena, the labour wing of Shiv Sena Punjab.
13. 6 August 2016 - Rashtriya Swayamsevak Sangh Vice President Brigadier (retd) Jagdish Gagneja was shot at by motorcycle-borne persons in Chandigarh. He was admitted to hospital and died on 22 Sep.
14. On 27 November 2016, the leader of KLF, Harminder Singh, escaped from Nabha jail with 5 accomplices. Singh had been arrested for 10 terror-related charges after coming back from Thailand. He had been mobilising funds in Thailand. He was recaptured a day later.
15. On 14 January 2017 Amit Sharma, a Hindu religious preacher and political activist of Indian National Congress was killed in Ludhiana by two motorcycle-borne assassins.
16. On 25 February 2017 two Dera Sacha Sauda followers, Satpal Kumar and his son Ramesh Kumar, were killed prayer hall in Jagera near Malaudh by two shooters on a motorcycle.
17. On 15 July 2017 Sultan Masih, a pastor at Temple of God church, in Ludhiana was shot dead by motorcycle-borne assassins who fired multiple shots killing him on the spot.
18. On 17 October 2017 a RSS and Bharatiya Janata Party leader, Ravinder Gosai, was shot dead in Ludhiana by two motorcycle-borne assassins. He was the RSS regional leader of Ludhiana.
19. An investigation report by the National Investigation Agency in 2017 into a series of targeted killings in Punjab including of Rashtriya Swayamsevak Sangh workers, Dera Sacha Sauda and a pastor, stated that Pakistan's Inter-Service Intelligence was taking help of Khalistani extremists to stoke unrest in the state and revive militancy. ISI had taken the help of Khalistan Liberation Force led by Harminder Singh Nihang and Harmeet Singh, reported to be living in Pakistan under ISI cover.
20. On 1 Oct 2018, the Government of India initiated steps to ban KLF under the Unlawful Activities Prevention Act (UAPA) after a proposal from the NIA. NIA had claimed that KLF is currently being run by Gursharanbir Singh living in UK and Harmeet Singh living in Pakistan. The two operatives had collected funding from Australia, Italy, Pakistan, UAE and UK and posed a threat to the country. The ban would enable the government to choke its funding, recruitment and training activities. According to Home Ministry of India, KLF will be the 40th organisation to be banned. Other Sikh terrorist groups already banned are Babbar Khalsa International, International Sikh Youth Federation, Khalistan Commando Force and Khalistan Zindabad Force.
21. Several KLF operatives named by the NIA in its charge sheet filed in 2018. Jagtar Singh Johal alias Jaggi an NRI and British national was chargesheeted for conspiring to carry out attacks in India. Hardeep Singh from Italy and Ramandeep Singh from Ludhiana were sharpshooters who in October 2017, had murdered a Hindu RSS activist Ravinder Gosain.
22. In 2018, the Union Minister of State for Home Affairs, G. Kishan Reddy of India said that the KLF was involved in the grenade attack at a Nirankari prayer hall in Adliwal village, Amritsar on 18 November 2018. The International Sikh Youth Federation (ISYF) is also said to have been involved in the attack. The blast claimed 3 lives including 1 preacher and left over 20 injured. The Punjab Police arrested three perpetrators responsible for the blast. After the arrest, it was found out that the perpetrators had links with Harmeet Singh Happy, the chief of KLF.

=== 2020s ===
1. Harmeet Singh P.h.D alias Happy who was the chief of KLF was murdered in Pakistan on 27 January 2020. He was wanted in cases of smuggling and the 2016-2017 Punjab targeted killings.
2. In October 2020 KLF killed a Shaurya Chakra awardee Comrade Balwinder Singh Sandhu. Sandhu was given the award for fighting miltians in Punjab during the 80s and 90s the period of the Punjab Insurgency. 8 KLF members were arrested in connection.
3. KLF chief Avtar Singh Khanda was accused of being a major party involved in the 2021 Indian farmers' Republic Day protest. According to Delhi Police it saw 1 farmer be killed, 349 police injured. thousands of farmers injured, 30 police vehicles damaged, suspension of internet service, and damage to the Red Fort. The Nishan Sahib was hung in the Red Fort.
4. KLF member Lakhbir Singh Rode was accused by a chargesheet for a bomb blast in a Ludhiana Court on 23 December 2021. It resulted in 1 death and 6 injuries.
5. KLF chief Avtar Singh Khanda was accused by Indian agencies for training Amritpal Singh.
6. On 19 March 2023, Avtar Singh Khanda, chief of KLF, pulled down the Indian flag and waved the Khalistan flag instead at the India House, London. The mob he led also broke a window.
7. On 1 April 2023, KLF claimed responsibility for setting fire to Wazirpur factory in New Delhi, Azma Hotel in Panchkula, and Kanpur market in 3 separate incidents. Security agencies have not confirmed these claims. The Wazirpur fire saw no casualties and was put out quickly. It led to some infrastructure damage. The fire at Azma Hotel saw no casualties. It led to the burning of kitchenware, and the dropped ceiling. It was put out in 30 minutes. The Kanpur market fire saw more than 800 shops burnt and took about 90 hours to put out. To put the fire out more than 500 firefighters from 2 districts were used as well as 2 teams of NDRF and 2 teams of SDRF. It also required the India army and Indian air force. The fire caused a loss of 3,000 crore (30,000,000,000) rupees.
8. KLF chief Avtar Singh Khanda has been accused of helping Amritpal Singh evade police for 35 days beginning on 18 March 2023, and ending 23 April 2023.
9. KLF chief Avtar Singh Khanda would die on 15 June 2023, reportedly from blood cancer. His supporters alleged he was poisoned by the Indian Government.
10. Shiv Sena local leader Rajiv Mahajan was shot and injured along with his son and brother by KLF members in Bathinda on 24 June 2023.
11. KLF claimed responsibility for twin bomb blasts that took place on the night of 5th May 2026 in Jalandhar, Punjab.

== See also ==
- History of the Punjab
- Operation Blue Star
- Kharku
- Sikh extremism
- Sikh nationalism
- Terrorism in India
- Sikh massacre in Pilibhit forest
