= Dashmesh Regiment =

Sikh Khalistani militant group

- Leader: Seetal Singh Matewal
- Dates active: 1982 – present
- Active regions: India
- Ideology: Sikh nationalism
- Status: Active

The Dashmesh Regiment is a militant group, and is part of the Khalistan movement to create a Sikh homeland called Khalistan via armed struggle.

== History ==
The Dashmesh Regiment jathebandi group has claimed responsibility for two of the killings in the 2016–17 Targeted killings in Punjab, India. The origins, leadership, and existence of Dasmesh Regiment is hazy. Some believe it was created by a third-party to put blame of their activities of Jarnail Singh. The Dasmesh Regiment first leader is alleged to be Surinder Singh Gill or Harminder Singh Sandhu the general secretary of the AISSF. Sandhu had admitted to his leadership of the regiment, but also denied it. Some say that it was led by Major General Shabeg Singh. Another belief holds that Dashmesh Regiment was a broad name used by the media to pin responsibility for crimes. It is known that Seetal Singh Mattewal created a militant group in 1990 with the name of Dashmesh Regiment and was its head.

== Notable Activities ==
- On March 28,1984, Dasmesh Regiment members killed H.S. Manchanda who was the pro government president of DSGMC. Manchanda was killed in broad daylight in Delhi. He had become enemies with Akali Dal after holding his presidency two years after his term expired. He was also targeted for his links with Indira Gandhi's Congress. Manchanda had stopped at a red light in his car. Sodhi and another walked up to him and pumped seven bullets into Manchanda. The driver was also shot when he tried to intervene. Manchanda's bodyguard missed all the shots he fired. The driver survived. The killing was described as greatly planned and led to suspicions of an insider who helped.
- April 2, 1984, the Dasmesh Regiment killed former MLA Harbans Lal Khanna in his medical shop in Amritsar. Khanna was the BJP district president at the time. His bodyguard and one customer of his shop were also killed. Militants also burned down a police jeep by Khanna's shop. The assassins had posed as police officers. One waited outside on a motorcycle, one entered the shop. Entering the shop the militant opened fire with a Sten gun killing Khann's bodyguard and others, all of whom were sitting. Khanna shouted frantically. The militant said, "Dhoti, topi (hat), at Yamuna. Long live Khalistan." He then killed Khanna Khanna had raised slogans translating to, "We are not going to let any second or third group exist, we are not going to let a turban remain on any head; the kacchera, the kara, the kirpan, send these to Pakistan". In February 1984 he led a mob that destroyed a replica of the Golden Temple at Amritsar railway station and put feces and lit cigarettes on a painting of Guru Ram Das which had been on display for many years. All of this had made him a prime target for Sikhs. The killing of Khanna led to a 48-hour curfew in Amritsar and paramilitary and army deployment to the city. Soon rioting also broke out. The riots left at least seven dead.
- On April 3, 1984, the Dasmesh Regiment killed Rajya Sabha member of the Congress party and professor Dr. V. N. Tiwari. Tiwari was killed in his home in Chandigarh. According to police militants knocked on Tiwari's door. When a worker opened the door they claimed to be students from Patiala wanting to see Tiwari. Tiwari came and invited them in. One stayed at the door while one came in. He fired six bullets into Tiwari at point-blank range and fled in a getaway vehicle, a grey Fiat, waiting for them. A note left by Dashmesh Regiment claimed responsibility. They said they would kill ''one senior officer every day in Punjab'' until the ban on the All India Sikh Student Federation is lifted. The killing sent shockwaves throughout India. Prime Minister Indira Gandhi said, ''The killing of such a person is an index of the madness which has seized the terrorists''. The day after the killing the entire opposition in the Lok Sabha walked out and boycotted proceedings in honour of Tiwari.
- On April 14, 1984, the Dasmesh Regiment set fire to 37 railway stations in Punjab and sabotaged communication.
- On May 12, 1984, Labh Singh, Gursewak Singh Babla, Gurinder Singh and Swaranjit Singh were accused of killing Hind Samachar newspaper group editor Ramesh Chander, who was an outspoken critic of Jarnail Singh Bhindranwale and had written that Punjab had "become a slaughterhouse." Chander was killed in a busy intersection in Jalandhar. In a call to an Amritsar news agency Dashmesh Regiment claimed responsibility for the killing.
- Dasmesh Regiment was blamed for the Air India 182 flight bombing. Bagri a suspect in the bombing refuted this and said, “We did this.”
- In April 1986 the regiment killed a senior leader of Rajiv Gandhi’s administration.
- On October 2, 1986, Dashmesh Regiment attempted to assassinate Rajiv Gandhi.
- Operation Vadhi Pahar was launched to capture or kill the Dashmesh Regiment, more specifically its leader Seetal Singh Mattewal. Units from the Indian Army, National Security Guard, Central Reserve Police Force, Border Security Force, and Punjab Police would take part in the Operation. A fierce battle occurred at Bolowali. There were only five members of Dashmesh Regiment while there were 12,000 security forces. The militants had an advantage as they were on a hill. Seetal Singh used a Dragunov Rifle in the battle. The other members had AK-47s and one had a machine gun. After heavy casualties the Indian commanders authorised the use of mortar shells and bombs. After this still failed to subdue the Seetal Singh and his men the Indian forces used bulletproof tractors. Seetal Singh and the other four militants repulsed the bulletproof tractors. The forces used chemical bombs, but they were also ineffective. After 48 hours of fighting the militants were eventually killed with Seetal Singh putting on a bold last stand.
- In 2016 Dashmesh Regiment claimed responsibility for the killing of Rashtriya Swayamsevak Sangh (RSS) deputy chief retired Brigadier R.S. Gagneja. They claimed responsibility over an email, but the authenticity of the claim is disputed.
- In 2016 Dashmesh Regiment claimed responsibility for killing Shiv Sena leader Durga Prasad Gupta. Authenticity of the claim is disputed.

== See also ==
- Kharku
- History of the Punjab
- Operation Blue Star
- Terrorism in India
- Sikh extremism
- Insurgency in Punjab
