= Arrest of Jagtar Singh Johal =

2017 event in Punjab, India

The arrest of Jagtar Singh Johal was a detainment that began in November 2017 in Punjab, India. According to the human rights organisation Reprieve, UK spy agencies tipped off their Indian counterparts about a key man, "Johal", who was in India. Johal was arrested based on allegations that he was involved in the assassinations of religious and political figures, internet activity, and that he was a member of the Khalistan Liberation Force (KLF). His legal team and supporters claim Johal was tortured and forced to sign a false confession shortly after his arrest, a claim that Indian authorities deny. Johal was facing the death penalty based on these allegations but his case had been characterized by delays. On 4 March 2025, Johal was acquitted of terror charges by a verdict in the District Court in Moga, Punjab after seven years of detainment in India, although other charges still remain. On 1 October 2026, he was released on bail.

The arrest has led to a social-media campaign calling for Johal's release and the incarcertation of Johal remains a cause of diplomatic issues between the United Kingdom and India. According to the United States Commission on International Religious Freedom, he is being "detained for his religious belief and for documenting religious freedom violations."

== Arrest ==
Jagtar Singh Johal, a Scottish-Sikh who is originally from Dumbarton in the United Kingdom, was arrested in India in early November 2017 by plain clothes police officers of the Punjab Police. The arrest took place weeks after Johal's wedding in India. According to the United Nations' Working Group on Arbitrary Detention, Johal has been detained "arbitrarily" and should be released immediately. Following their investigations, the UN group concluded that Johal's detention without trial was "on discriminatory grounds, owing to his status as a human rights defender and based on his political activism, religious faith and opinions," something Johal's family have asserted since he was first arrested in 2017. Jagtar Singh Johal told the BBC that he had been tortured and forced to sign false confessions, although the BBC could not verify the allegations of torture. The Indian government denied any mistreatment or torture in this case. Jagtar Singh Johal is accused for the involvement in the murders of Brigadier (retd) Jagdish Gagneja, RSS leader Ravinder Gosain and Pastor Sultan Masih and for funding of the terrorist organization Khalistan Liberation Force in November 2017, for which there is no judicially admissible evidence against him, despite intelligence agencies having over three years to investigate. Johal has not been brought to trial.

Johal is currently being held at Tihar jail and has yet to face trial despite being in Indian custody since 2017. In May 2022, a UN panel of human rights experts found the arrest and detainment arbitrary and requested that Indian authorities to immediately release Johal.

== Reason for arrest ==
The Indian authorities have not yet provided Johal's lawyer with evidence linking him to any crimes, thereby making it impossible for Johal to be brought to trial. Johal's lawyer alleges there is no such evidence, implying that the Indian authorities are deliberately and illegally detaining Johal. While in custody, Johal was also charged with another crime. Indian authorities allege that Johal travelled to Paris in 2013 to deliver £3,000 to KLF figures, with that money being used to purchase arms that are linked to the murders and attacks on Hindu nationalist leaders and other figures from 2016 to 2017.

Meanwhile, Johal's legal team and supporters claim that he arrested based on his role in raising awareness on crimes and atrocities committed against Sikhs in the 1980s during the years of the Punjab insurgency. A 2022 UN panel of human rights experts concluded that Johal had been arrested based on discrimination "owing to his status as a human rights defender and based on his political activism, religious faith and opinions".

His family allege that he was falsely detained and forced to sign blank statements and face torture in prison. Police have denied these claims and termed them "emotional drama", noting that anyone suffering the extent of torture alleged by Johal would have succumbed to his wounds. International and Sikh human rights groups in Punjab and the diaspora, as well as over 140 UK Members of Parliament (MPs), including the former Brexit secretary David Davis; the former international development secretary Hilary Benn; the father of the house, Sir Peter Bottomley; the SNP leader at Westminster, Ian Blackford; Sheffield's mayor, Dan Jarvis; the former Foreign Office minister Lord Hain; the former Liberal Democrat leader Menzies Campbell; and Andrew Rosindell, a Conservative member of the foreign affairs select committee have written to Dominic Raab urging him to do more to secure the release of Johal. They are concerned over Johal's detention and allegations of brutal treatment towards Johal - the Indian police have been accused of torturing him whilst in custody. The Indian government has cited significant Khalistani outreach towards Indian-origin British MPs for their support towards Johal and insisted that their opposition is based on appeasing sentiments of large voting blocs.

=== Internet activity ===
The Print reported in December 2017 that the NeverForget84.com website was operated by Jagtar Singh Johal. Dinkar Gupta (DGP intelligence, Punjab) claimed that after creating NeverForget84.com, Johal would launch another pro-Khalistani website called 1984Tribute.com. Ananya Gautam (IG, counter intelligence, Punjab Police) claims that Jaggi was being assisted by a relative of Gursharan Bir to operate his websites. Gursharan Bir is a wanted-suspect of the murder of Rashtriya Sikh Sangat leader Rulda Singh in Patiala in 2009.

Gurpreet Singh Johal, brother of Jagtar Singh Johal, reported to the BBC that Jagtar had conducted research and provided translations on behalf of the website. Jaggi's lawyer Jaspal Singh Manjhpur claims Jaggi was arrested because he operated a website covering the anti-Sikh riots and that he translated Punjabi content into English that was "exposing the deeds of the Punjab Police" globally. Sikh activists claim that Jagtar was spreading awareness amongst the Sikh youth about the events of 1984 through the website, which is why he was targeted by the police.

== Situation as of August 2023 ==
Johal's case had now been forwarded to the UN's Special Rapporteur on torture and other cruel, inhuman or degrading treatment or punishment for further investigation. A UK government spokesperson said: "We have consistently raised our concerns about Mr Johal's case with the government of India, including his allegations of torture and mistreatment and his right to a fair trial.

Jagtar Singh Johal was an accused in 11 cases out of which he has been discharged in 1 case and has been granted bail in 3 other cases. One of his bail applications (RC No. 24/2017/NIA/DLI - Attempt of Killing) was initially denied by an NIA Special Judge, but this order was reversed on appeal by the High Court of Haryana and Punjab. That decision of the High Court was appealed by the NIA, but the High Court's judgement was upheld by the Supreme Court of India, quashing the order denying bail on that charge. Although Johal is now eligible for bail on that case, his full release is still reportedly precluded by charges in other cases.

== UK Intelligence Services involvement ==
On 22 August 2022, it was reported by The Times that MI5 and MI6 staff supplied information that led to the alleged torture of a British citizen in India, apparently in breach of Britain's commitment to human rights.

== Acquittal in Moga District Court Case ==
On the 4th of March 2025 a verdict in the District Court in Moga, Punjab acquitted him of conspiracy under the country's anti-terror law and of being a member of a "terrorist gang". The judge ruled that in at-least one case, the charges should not stand and Johal should be released. However, eight other terror-related cases against him still remain. The remaining cases will be heard in a Delhi court and the prosecutor is the National Investigation Agency.

== Renewed calls for release ==
On the 1 May 2025 it was announced over 100 MPs have called on Foreign Secretary David Lammy to take urgent diplomatic action to secure his release, citing a key legal opportunity following his acquittal. Johal's family and human rights groups argue the prosecution is politically motivated and that his continued imprisonment reflects a failure of UK foreign policy. The Indian government denies any wrongdoing and insists due process has been followed.

== Release on bail ==
Johal was released on bail on 1 October 2026 from Tihar Prison in Janakpuri after being granted bail by the Delhi High Court on 18 September 2026. Despite his release on bail, there are remaining cases against him. Furthermore, he was ordered to surrender his passport and banned from speaking to the media about the case.

== See also ==
- 2016–17 Targeted killings in Punjab, India
