= Dharam Singh (field hockey, born 1919) =

Indian field hockey player

Olympic medal record

Men's field hockey

Representing India
Gold medal – first place	1952 Helsinki	Team competition
Gold medal – first place	1964 Tokyo	Team competition

Dharam Singh Gill (19 January 1919 in Gandiwind – 5 December 2001 in Chandigarh) was an Indian field hockey player who played as a right back in the gold medal-winning team at the 1952 Helsinki Olympic Games.
