= Shakuntala Vashishta =

Indian police officer

Shakuntala Vashishta was the first woman in the Indian Police Service who later became a deputy superintendent, in 1969.

== Education ==
Vashishta held degrees of Master of Arts and bachelor of laws.

== Career ==
Vashishta started her career as an inspector in Punjab Police. She served as a police inspector for 17 years before becoming a deputy superintendent of police (DSP) in 1966. She became a DSP in Delhi Police in 1969. She retired in September 1984 from her last position as a deputy commissioner of police from the 9th Battalion of the Delhi Armed Forces.
