= Moga massacre =

1989 massacre

1989 Moga Massacre
- Part of Insurgency in Punjab
- Location: Nehru Park, Moga, India
- Date: 25 June 1989 (IST)
- Target: Rashtriya Swayamsevak Sangh
- Attack type: Bomb Blast; Mass Shooting
- Deaths: 26
- Injuries: 35
- Perpetrators: Khalistan Liberation Force *Gurjant Singh Budhsinghwala *Bhindranwale Tiger Force of Khalistan
- Motive: Sikh separatism; Persecution of Hindus

The 1989 Moga Massare was a massacre targeting Hindus where 21 Rashtriya Swayamsevak Sangh (RSS) members and 5 others, including a police officer and home guard, were killed at Nehru Park in Moga during an RSS meeting. The massacre was organised and executed by Sikh militants.

== Incident ==
On 25 June 1989 the Rashtriya Swayamsevak Sangh (RSS) organised an event at Nehru Park in Moga during the early hours of the morning. Sikh militants of Khalistan Liberation Force and Bhindranwale Tiger Force of Khalistan, led by Gurjant Singh Budhsinghwala, fired indiscriminately with automatic weapons from a white van killing multiple people before escaping in the same vehicle. Following the firing two bombs exploded killing multiple others. 26 were killed and 35 injured. A majority of the killed were RSS members with 2 security officials also killed. A responding Deputy Superintendent of Police and Inspector were seriously injured in the second explosion. The firing lasted for over 5 minutes. Police alleged the attack was done to spread terror and push Hindus out of Punjab where militants want a nation called Khalistan formed. Home Minister Buta Singh described the incident as, "a very serious attempt on the part of terrorists to whip up tension along communal lines."

== Aftermath ==
While escaping the militants shot dead a Hindu couple from their vehicle and seriously injured their daughter. Immediately following the massacre a curfew was instated in Moga and the BJP and RSS organised a bandh on the following day in Delhi. A total bandh was organised the next day across Punjab and police heavily tightened security. The Central Reserve Police Force faced heavy criticism for their delayed response despite being stationed 50 yards away. State Governor S. S. Ray gave the police 7 days to capture the killers responsible "dead or alive".

Two days after the incident Khalistan Liberation Force and Bhindranwale Tiger Force of Khalistan claimed responsibility for the massacre and credited it to Gurjant Singh Budhsinghwala, Dyal Singh, Bamb Singh, and Avtar Singh Jayak. The mastermind of the plot, Gurjant Singh Budhsinghwala, would be killed in a police encounter in 1992.

The park would later be renamed to Shahidi Park (Martyr Park) where a memorial would be erected. A memorial committee would be formed that pay tributes to the victims families every year.

== See also ==
- List of terrorist incidents in Punjab, India
- List of bus killings during Punjab insurgency
- Moga agitation
