= Pir Muhammad =

Pir Muhammad may refer to:

- Pir Muhammad (son of Jahangir) (c.1374 – 1407) - Timurid dynasty, Central Asian Turko-Mongol ruler
- Pir Muhammad (son of Umar Shaikh) (c.1379 – 1409) - Timurid dynasty, cousin of the above
- Pir Muhammad Khan I - Shaybanid dynasty, Central Asian Uzbek-Mongol ruler
- Pir Muhammad Khan II - Shaybanid dynasty, Central Asian Uzbek-Mongol ruler
- Qadi Pir Muhammad (fl. mid-18th century)- Avar leader during Nader's Dagestan campaign, specifically Battle of Andalal in 1742
- Pir Muhammad Khan Shirwani - A senior official of the Mughal Empire
- Pir Mohammad, village in Iran
- Pir Mohammad, Ilam, village in Iran
- Peer Mohammad, village in India
