= Karnail Singh Peer Mohammad =

Indian politician

- ਕਰਨੈਲ ਸਿੰਘ ਪੀਰ ਮੁਹੰਮਦ

Ex-President, All India Sikh Students Federation
- In office 1995-2019

General Secretary, Shiromani Akali Dal
- Incumbent
- Assumed office 2021

Personal details
- Born: 21 July 1968 (age 58)
- Party: Shiromani Akali Dal (Punar Surjit)
- Other political affiliations: Shiromani Akali Dal
- Spouse: Sukhwinder Kaur
- Children: 2 sons
- Parents: Gurcharan Singh (father); Pal Kaur (mother)
- Website: Karnail Singh Peer Mohammad on Facebook

Karnail Singh Peer Mohammad (Punjabi: ਕਰਨੈਲ ਸਿੰਘ ਪੀਰ ਮੁਹੰਮਦ) is an Indian Sikh politician and former President of All India Sikh Students Federation. As of 2022, he is serving as general secretary and spokesperson of Shiromani Akali Dal.

== Personal life ==
Karnail Singh Peer Mohammad was born in 1968, to Gurcharan Singh and Pal Kaur. He has two siblings. His younger brother is a PPS officer and is posted as a district jail superintendent. His sister is married in a well known transport family of Mumbai. He is married to Sukhwinder Kaur from Tarn Taran Sahib. Peer Mohammad has two sons. His native village is Peer Mohammad.

== Political career ==
Peer Mohammad became President of All India Sikh Student Federation since 19 January 1995. He stepped down from the post of president in 2019, citing the need to bring young leaders forward for betterment of Sikh panth and its values. He is currently serving as the Chief Spokesperson for Shiromani Akali Dal.

Under Peer Mohammad's leadership, the federation has worked for issues of Punjab and defending the values of Sikhism. The organization has also worked on SYL Water issues for Punjab.

Peer Mohammad has also served as the director of Punjab Agro Industry Corporation. He is currently the Director of International Sikh Sports Council.This council initiated to make a Sikh Saroop Hockey team. Till now, the International Sikh Sports Council has organised two International Hockey tournaments.The first Hockey tournament was organised in Mata Sahib Kaur Hockey Academy at the Astroturf Stadium in Jarkhar village, Ludhiana. The second tournament was organised in Mohali International Hockey Stadium, in Mohali.

In August 2018 unidentified persons attacked the parental house of Peer Mohammad. His house was attacked because he was continuously fighting against the drug mafia. Karnail was not at home at that time. His father, Gurcharan Singh, and other family members were present. No one was hurt in the incident.

He demanded a complete ban on the screening of "Messenger of God" due to controversial dialogues in the movie.

In 2015, Peer Mohammad organised a 'Insaaf March' from Anandpur Sahib to the residence of Punjab chief minister at Chandigarh demanding justice for the 1984 Sikh genocide victims. He struggled a lot in getting Sajjan Kumar and Jagdish Titler arrested for the 1984 Sikh Genocide.

Karnail Singh Peer Mohammad and Parminder Singh Dhingra have penned a letter to the Central Board of Film Certification (CBFC), registering their strong objection to specific scenes in the movie "Animal" that have caused considerable distress among the Sikh community. The AISSF earnestly urges the CBFC to expeditiously address this matter by eliminating the offensive scenes from the film.

== Achievements ==
Peer Mohammad was honoured in 2013 by the England Parliament Westminster by the Sikh and Punjabi Community.

In 2014, he was honoured with a gold medal by the Sikh Supreme Council in gurdwara Takanini Gurdwara Sahib, New Zealand.

He was also honoured in Gurdwara Guru Nanak Darbar, Dublin in Sydney, Australia because of his Panthic works.
