= Gaurav Yadav =

Gaurav Yadav may refer to:

- Gaurav Yadav (cricketer)
- Gaurav Yadav (police officer)
