= Shiromani Akali Dal (Punar Surjit) =

- Abbreviation: SAD (PS)
- Leader: Giani Harpreet Singh
- Founded: 11 August 2025 (15 months ago)
- Split from: Shiromani Akali Dal
- Headquarters: 182/80 Industrial Area Phase I, Chandigarh, 160002
- Ideology: Sikh interests
- Colours: Saffron
- ECI status: Unregistered
- Seats in Rajya Sabha: 0 / 245
- Seats in Lok Sabha: 0 / 543
- Seats in Punjab Legislative Assembly: 0 / 117

The Shiromani Akali Dal (Punar Surjit) (SAD (PS)) is a Sikh political party in India, formed after a split in the Shiromani Akali Dal.

== Foundation ==
On August 11, 2025, the breakaway faction of Shiromani Akali Dal was solidified as a separate political group through the unanimous election of former Jathedar of the Akal Takht, Giani Harpreet Singh, as the President of the faction. Bibi Satwant Kaur, the daughter of Sikh martyr, 'Bhai' Amrik Singh, was declared as the chairperson of the Panthic Council. This breakaway faction of Shiromani Akali Dal included multiple prominent leaders, such as Prem Singh Chandumajra, Bibi Jagir Kaur, Parminder Singh Dhindsa, Iqbal Singh Jhundan, Surjit Singh Rakhra and sitting MLA Manpreet Singh Ayali.

The early platform of this political group encompassed plans to address the issues of Shiromani Gurdwara Parbandhak Committee elections, the release of Sikh political prisoners, and justice regarding Guru Granth Sahib desecration. Giani Harpreet Singh stated that the faction will attempt to get the faction registered by ECI as the official 'Shiromani Akali Dal'. A central message of the party has been that it is the true heir of the Akali legacy.

== Presence ==
In April 2026, the party formally entered into talks for an alliance with Akali Dal (Waris Punjab De) for the 2027 Punjab election, with Manpreet Singh Ayali appointed as the conveyor of a coordination committee. On 17 May 2026, the failure of talks between both parties resulted in a dismissal of the alliance proposal. Party leaders such as Gurpartap Singh Wadala have often reiterated that the party is open to a possible alliance with Bharatiya Janata Party.

=== Dissipating Members and Cadre ===
In May 2026, the party's sole elected member, Manpreet Singh Ayali, resigned from the party, later joining Akali Dal (Waris Punjab De). Other members who have left the party to join Amritpal Singh's party include Darshan Singh Shivalik, a major Dalit Sikh face. Santa Singh Umaidpuri also left the Akali Dal Punar Surjit and joined Amritpal Singh, and on 21 July 2026, as senior member Iqbal Singh Jhundan split from the main faction led by Giani Harpreet Singh and formed his own group with more than a dozen members, endorsing Amritpal Singh. Other members of the party have also reportedly entered talks with joining Amritpal Singh including Sucha Singh Chhotepur, Adesh Partap Singh Kairon, Bibi Satwant Kaur, Karnail Singh Peer Mohammad and many others. Otherwise Surjit Singh Rakhra joined the Aam Aadmi Party.
