= 1991 Sikh killings in Uttar Pradesh =

Pilibhit forest massacre in Uttar Pradesh, India

- Location: 28°43′7.7196″N 80°4′19.0848″E; Pilibhit Tiger Reserve, Uttar Pradesh, India
- Date: 13 July 1991
- Target: Sikhs
- Attack type: Extrajudicial killings; Encounters; Abuse; Shooting
- Deaths: 10
- Motive: Counterterrorism
- Convicted: 43

On 12 July 1991, a vehicle carrying 25 Sikh pilgrims was stopped by the police at a checkpoint in Budaun district of Uttar Pradesh, India. Eleven of the male passengers were detained by police, ten of whom were later shot dead by police on 13 July 1991 in three different locations in the deep forest of Pilibhit tiger reserve in Pilibhit distinct, who alleged they were terrorists. The status of the eleventh detainee, a 15-year-old boy, remains unknown. The independent investigation done by various media agencies as well as political parties did conclude that two of the 10 killed were actually wanted militants - Baljit Singh of Khalistan Liberation Army and Khalistan Commando Force chieftain Jaswant Singh 'Fauji'. In 2016, 47 police officers involved with the killings were sentenced to life in prison; these sentences were overturned by a higher court, who in 2022 sentenced 43 of the officers to seven years in prison and fine.

== Background ==
Pilibhit lies in the Terai region of Uttar Pradesh, in the marshy plains along the Nepal border. The Terai is adjacent to Punjab and a significant Sikh migrant population from Pakistan were settled here after partition of India. Because of its proximity and demographic profile, local suspicions and tensions exist about spill over from militant activities in Punjab. Due to which the terai had become associated with arms and drug smuggling routes from Punjab and Nepal, and that militants and criminal gangs operate in the area. Some police officials are alleged to be colluding with criminal networks or militants, complicating the distinction between state efforts for security and abuses.

To counter what was perceived as militant threats, the Uttar Pradesh police undertook search operations and detained many Sikh men, often under the Terrorist and Disruptive Activities Act (TADA). Many of these arrests and detentions were arbitrary, lacking due process, and in some cases led to summary executions or disappearances. TADA is a special security law that allows administrative detention, extends the period for interrogation in police custody, restricts bail, relies on secret witnesses, allows confessions, and limits access to appeal. Under TADA, many safeguards of criminal procedure and due process are suspended or diluted. Which further results in to abuses, extrajudicial killings, disappearances, custodial torture, and staged encounters frequently, and with little accountability.

== Incident ==
From 29 June to 13 July 1991, a vehicle carrying 25 Sikh pilgrims was touring several states (Uttar Pradesh, Madhya Pradesh, Maharashtra). The group included 13 men (two elderly), 9 women and 3 children (ages 10, 12 and 15). The pilgrimage began from Nanakmatha sahib in Nainital district, visited various Sikh religious sites en-route and were on the way to Hazur Sahib Gurdwara in Nanded in Maharashtra.

On 12 July 1991, the vehicle was traveling in Uttar Pradesh and was stopped by the police at a checkpoint in Badaun district (Kachla Ghat) as police got a tip-off on some militants were onboard the bus. The police surrounded the vehicle with multiple police vans, trucks, and jeeps and ordered the tourists' vehicle to a police post. About 60–70 armed policemen were said to be present. Police removed the 13 male passengers, tied their hands behind their backs, alleged insults and instructions to keep heads down. Both elderly men were returned to the vehicle later; the remaining 11 men were detained. During the ensuing journey, police continued to accompany the vehicle, remained aboard, directed its route, and forbade the passengers to look around or move. The men’s personal belongings were confiscated. The vehicle was then diverted to the Pilibhit Guest House, but shortly after, it was ordered to stop near a canal. The detainees were taken away, and police questioned one of the women about her son, a previously arrested individual. The vehicle continued to Pilibhit and then was allowed to disperse; the detained men were not allowed contact with families or lawyers.

== Encounter ==
On 14 July 1991, news emerged that ten of the eleven detained men had been killed in three separate encounters in the forested region near the Nepal border, which is now called Pilibhit Tiger Reserve. One minor detainee, a 15-year-old boy Talvinder Singh (also known as “Billu”), son of one of the organisers of the pilgrimage, whose status remains unknown. Police Superintendent R.D. Tripathi claimed the men were terrorists, associated with organizations like the Khalistan Liberation Force and Khalistan Commando Force, and that the encounters occurred at various places at night. However, independent investigation concluded that two of the 10 killed in these encounters were indeed well-known militants - Baljit Singh of Khalistan Liberation Army and Khalistan Commando Force chieftain Jaswant Singh 'Fauji' ; the rest appear unconnected to militant activity. Investigations by various groups noted that some of the bodies were discovered by villagers or reported by journalists. One farmer near a site claimed a man cried for help, then gunshots were heard. The bodies were allegedly cremated early morning; families and legal representatives were not informed or allowed to claim the bodies.

== Victims ==
Of the eleven men taken into custody, ten were later reported killed in three separate incidents. Later in April 2016, The Court ordered payment of Rs.14 lakh each to the victim's families. The list of victims include Baljit Singh, a wanted terrorist of Khalistan Liberation Army and Jaswant Singh Fauji, another wanted terrorist of Khalistan Commando Force, Along with other pilgrims Jaswant Singh, Harbinder Singh, Sujan Singh, Bichchettar Singh, Kartar Singh and Tarsem Singh; all resident of Gurdaspur, Punjab. Surmej Singh, and Narender Singh of Amaria, Pilibhit.

== Aftermath ==
Musaraf Hussain, the bus driver gave sworn testimony describing how the bus was stopped, how police intervened, how he was threatened and coerced into leaving blank statements, and ultimately how he feared for his life. Witnesses who had signed affidavits filed in the Supreme Court were reportedly intimidated. One was followed in a police van, threatened in the gurdwara, and asked not to testify. Notices were sent out by Pilibhit police to Sikh men in the region, accusing them of harboring terrorists and warning them under penal and anti‑terror laws. The frequency of such notices increased after the incident. Public outcry and media attention forced the state government to respond: on 23 July 1991, Superintendent Tripathi was transferred. On 21 August, the Supreme Court ordered compensation of Rs.50,000 for each dependent of the ten killed men. The Central Bureau of Investigation charged 47 officers involved with the incident in 1991. In 2016, a special court sentenced 47 of those officers to life in prison for their involvement in setting up and covering up the killings; ten of the charged officers had died by that point. In 2022, Allahabad High Court convicted 43 officers for the killings, sentencing them to seven years in prison.

== Conviction ==
The court convicted all 47 cops, but 4 cops had already died by the time, so court sentenced only 43 officers to seven years in prison and fined Rs.11 lakh each to then Station house officers, Rs.8 lakh each to then Sub-inspectors and Rs.2.75 lakh each to the Constable. List of conspirators include Gyan Giri, Subhash Chandra, Lakhan Singh, Nazim Khan, Harpal Singh, Rajendra Singh, Narayan Das, Krishna Veer, Karan Singh, Rakesh Singh, Nemchandra, Shamsher Ahmed, Satyendra Singh, Badan Singh, Devendra Pandey, Mohd. Anees, Ramesh Chandra,Veer Pal Singh, Natthu Singh, Dhaniram, Sugamchandra, Kalacter Singh, Kunwar Pal Singh, Shyam Babu, Banwari Lal, Dinesh Singh, Sunil Kumar Dixit,Arvind Singh, Ram Nagina,Vijay Kumar Singh, Vijendra Singh, M.P. Mittal, M.C. Durgapal, R.K. Raghav, Surjeet Singh, Udai Pal Singh, Munna Khan, Durvijay Singh, Mahaveer Singh, Gaya Ram, Ragister Singh, Rasid Hussain, Syed Ali Raza Rizvi, Satyapal Singh, Harpal Singh, Ram Chandra Singh.

== See also ==
- Khalistan Liberation Force
- Khalistan Commando Force
- Khalistan
- Pilibhit Tiger Reserve
