= Moga agitation =

The Moga agitation was a leftist protest in Punjab, India from 1972–74 against corruption, unemployment, fee hikes, and a lack of proper education facilities, resulting from the deaths of four people due to policing firing in 1972. (Note: The incident is also known as Moga Goli Kand 1972 and the movement born from the incident is also known as the 'Moga-Regal Cinema Movement'.) Aiming to secure revolutionary and secular goals, the protests were led by the Punjab Students Union (PSU) and the Naujawan Bharat Sabha. It was opposed to religious fundamentalism in the rural areas, instead focusing on a democratic struggle against feudalism and class oppression. The resulting social movement that consisted of peasantry and landless labourers led to the Moga Sangram rally of April 1974, leading to the formation of the Punjab Students Union and a challenging of Indira Gandhi's Congress government. The Moga Sangram Rally of 1974 was the largest demonstration by students in Punjab after 1947.

== History ==
In 1972, the Punjab Students Union (PSU) was formed, being influenced by the ideology of Bhagat Singh. Regal Cinema was a cinema hall located in the town of Moga, with there being accusations of black marketing of cinema tickets by the management of the cinema. Tickets were being hoarded, which led to them becoming unaffordable/inflated in-price. Student groups tried raising the issue at the magistrate's office but no heed was paid to their concerns. The students were also holding anger from police encounters against Naxalites in the late 1960's. The PSU partook in the protests under the leadership of president Iqbal Khan and general secretary Pirthipal Singh Randhawa. On 5 October 1972, a group of people were protesting against the black marketing of tickets at a cinema in Moga, with students picking up lathis and sticks from shops, and attempted to burn the cinema hall down, when police opened fire on them, after tear-gas failed to disperse the mob, leading to the deaths of four people. Two students, Harjit Singh and Swarn Singh of Charrik village, and passersbys Gurdev Singh and Kewal Krishan, were killed in the police firing, near Regal Cinema in Moga. Prohibitory orders were enforced with imposition of Section 144.

The incident lead to a movement known as the Moga agitation, a student movement which was led by leftist groups where protestors set afire government buildings and public transport for two months. The student movement had ramifications throughout the Punjab. Unrest would spread on 6 October to colleges in nearby Jagraon, Ludhiana, and Jalandhar. With the formation of a students association in Moga around the same time, the cinema hall was successfully set on-fire by students on 7 October 1972, with police killing a further two persons by firing. The Punjab government would close all colleges around the state as a reaction but student protesters would continue arson attacks against buses and cinemas. The All India Students' Federation itself departed from Moga to escape from the anger of the members of the Punjab Students' Union. However, there was a lack of representation of Dalit and landless labourer organisations, which weakened the movement.

The contemporary movement of Jayparakash Narayan was opposed by the PSU in Punjab, considering them to be too close to the ruling structure and not focusing enough on class. Ruling political parties, such as the Akali Dal or Congress, attempted to bring the protesters under the influence. The PSU formulated two slogans, dona ton mukti ("liberation from both Congress/Akali and J.P. [Jayparakash Narayan]") and sampuran inquilab ("complete revolution").

In 1972, PSU president Iqbal Khan and general secretary Pirthipal Singh Randhawa led protests against the price rise and the black marketing of cinema tickets. At the Moga Sangram Rally of April 1974, the Congress-run government of Indira Gandhi was challenged. In 1977, 2,000 persons marched for democracy. Prithipal Singh Randhawa would later be assassinated on 18 July 1979 in Ludhiana. The PSU later opposed the bus fare hike in 1979–80. After the rise of Sikh fundamentalism and the Khalistan movement in the 1980's, former student cadres joined the Sikh cause, leading to the decline of the student movement. The PSU itself would later splinter into three factions: the PSU, PSU (Shaheed Randhawa), and PSU Lalkar. The Punjab Students Union (Shaheed Randahawa) continues to focus on issues such as scheduled-caste and backward-caste scholarships, ending of fee rises, access to proper library facilities, the reconstruction of a memorial library dedicated to Bhagat Singh in Moga, and abolishing laws that it feels are anti-democratic.

== Legacy ==
A library would later be established at former location of Regal Cinema to commemorate the martyred students. The incident has been likened to the earlier Jallianwala Bagh massacre of 1919. The movement proved the efficacy of democratic resistance to bring about social change as an alternative to armed revolution. According to Amitoz Mann, spokesman of the Punjab Students Union (Shaheed Randhawa), the movement had its origins in unemployment, corruption illiteracy, male chauvinism, castesim, religious communalism, and absentee landlordism. He further states that failures of the leftist and democratic movement in Punjab would pave way to communal politics that led to the hardship of the 1980's and beyond via Sikh and Khalistani movements. Today, there is a lack of youth and student-led movements in the Punjab region, which is attributed to globalisation, emigration, careerism, privatisation, shift toward religious revivalism, communalism, and the proliferation of drugs. A similar protest was seen in 2015. However, student-led movements saw a revival in 2019, with the protests against the Citizenship (Amendment) Act (CAA) and the National Register of Citizens acts. There are now many different factions of the Punjab Students' Union, who played a role in the 2020–2021 Indian farmers' protest.

== See also ==
- Moga massacre
