= Harmeet Singh (militant) =

8th Chief of Khalistan Liberation Force

Acting Jathedar of Khalistan Liberation Force
- In office 18 April 2018 – 7 November 2014
- Preceded by: Harminder Singh Nihang
- Succeeded by: Avtar Singh Khanda

8th Jathedar of Khalistan Liberation Force
- In office 18 April 2018 – 27 January 2020

Personal details
- Born: 24 September 1981 Chheherta, Amritsar India
- Died: 27 January 2020 (aged 38) Dera Chahal gurdwara, Lahore Pakistan
- Education: Guru Nanak Dev University; Punjabi University
- Nickname(s): PhD; Happy

Harmeet Singh (24 September 1981 – 27 January 2020) also known as PhD or Happy was the 8th chief of Khalistan Liberation Force.

== Early life and education ==
Harmeet Singh was born on 24 September 1981, in Chheharta, Amritsar. Harmeet topped Master of Arts in religious studies and in psychology from Punjabi University, Patiala. Harmeet worked as a Junior Research Fellow in religious studies at Guru Nanak Dev University in 2008. He made 12,000 rupees a month. He was also pursuing a PhD.

== Militancy ==
Harmeet began associating himself with militants and became close with Khalistan Liberation Force chief Harminder Singh Nihang.

In May 2007, Ram Rahim was accused of hurting the religious sentiments of the Sikhs by wearing in an advertisement attire resembling the tenth and final living Sikh Guru Gobind Singh, by using a turban with a kalgi (egret feather). Sikh militant groups began multiple attacks against Ram Rahim for this. On 2 February 2008, Harmeet and other Khalistan Liberation Force members launched an attack on the head of Dera Sacha Sauda Ram Rahim. Ram Rahim escaped unhurt, but 11 followers were injured with 2 seriously injured.

On 5 November 2008, an FIR named Harmeet as receiving weapons, and ammunition to kill Ram Rahim. 3 men believed to be connected to Harmeet were arrested with 5 AK-56, 11 pistols, 900 cartridges, 2.5 million fake rupees and 25-kg heroin.

On 5 November 2008, Harmeet left home. The next day a police team raided Harmeet's home.

On 28 July 2009, KLF assassinated Rashtriya Sikh Sangat (A wing of Rashtriya Swayamsevak Sangh) President Rulda Singh. He would die in August of the same year. The same day KLF assassinated Dera Sacha Sauda, Srisa Manager Lilly Kumar in Ludhiana. Kumar was shot by 4 KLF members on motorcycles. Kumar was involved in clashes with Sikh.

On 31 October 2009, KLF assassinated 1984 anti-Sikh riots main accused Dr. Budh Parkash Kashyap on the 25th year anniversary of the riots. A masked man entered Kashyap's clinic and stabbed him twice in the head and chest. Kahsyap was checking a patient when he was attacked. The 1984 anti-Sikh riots was a series of organised pogroms against Sikhs in India following the assassination of Indira Gandhi by her Sikh bodyguards.

=== KLF leadership ===
On 7 November 2014, Harminder Singh Nihang, KLF chief, was arrested at Indira Gandhi International Airport in Delhi. Harmeet took over as acting chief of KLF in his place.

Harmeet next masterminded targeted killing of Dera Sacha Sauda, RSS, and Shiv Sena members and leaders. Harmeet recruited Hardeep Singh Shera and Ramandeep Singh Bagga to carry out the killings. They were trained by Harmeet, and after each killing would flee the country.

On 13 April 2015, KLF shot Shiv Sena Punjab secretary Harvinder Soni in the stomach at 8:30 am in Fish Park. Soni managed to survive the attack. Soni had been on the hit-list of militants since 2012 when he was accused of assaulting Sikh youth.

In July 2015 Khalistan Liberation Force mailed letters to seven Shiv Sena leaders including Sanjeev Ghanauli, Rajeev Tandon, Rakesh Arora, Amit Arora, Rubal Sandhu, Sachin Ghanauli and Rajesh Palta that gave a last warning for them to leave Punjab.

On 3 August 2015, president of the Punjab wing of Akhil Bharatiya Hindu Suraksha Samiti, Manish Sood, was killed. He was shot dead by his guard. Hindu leaders claimed KLF paid the guard to kill Sood. They claimed Sood had been receiving death threats from KLF after he attempted to attack Jagtar Singh Hawara while Hawara was heading to court. Sood had previously pulled down posters showing Jarnail Singh Bhindranwale. Police denied KLF being involved. Akhil Bharatiya Hindu Suraksha Samiti, Bajrang Dal and Shiv Sena and certain BJP leaders and members made a call for bandh and shops to be closed in Sirhind to protest the killing.

On 18 January 2016, Shera and Bagga on a motorcycle fired gun shots at new Kidwai Nagar Park in Ludhiana. The place was to host a Rashtriya Swayamsevak Sangh shakha (assembly) later in the day. No one was injured in the firing as the venue was vacant at the time of the attack.

On 19 January 2016, Rashtriya Swayamsevak Sangh (RSS) leader Naresh Kumar shot at and injured by Shera and Bagga at Kidwai Nagar's Shaheedi Park in Ludhiana city.

On 3 February 2016, Amit Arora, a Shiv Sena leader, was attacked by Shera and Bagga while he was sitting in his car in Ludhiana. Bagga fired, but missed his shot. Since Shera and Bagga were missing their shots they were trained to be "perfect" at shooting.

On 23 April 2016, Durga Parsad Gupta was shot dead by Bagga and Shera in Khanna city. He was the President of Mazdoor Sena, labour wing of Shiv Sena Punjab.

On 6 August 2016, Rashtriya Swayamsevak Sangh (RSS) Punjab Vice-President and retired Brigadier, Jagdish Gagneja was shot at by Bagga and Shea in Chandigarh. He was admitted to hospital and died on 22 Sep.

On 27 November 2016, the leader of KLF, Harminder Singh, escaped from maximum security Nabha jail with 5 accomplices. Nihang had been arrested for 10 terror-related charges after coming back from Thailand. He had been mobilizing funds in Thailand. Nihang was recaptured a day later. Harmeet had masterminded the jailbreak.

On 14 January 2017, Amit Sharma religious preacher, president of Hindu Takht and political activist of Indian National Congress killed in Ludhiana city by Bagga and Shera.

On 24 February 2017, Dera Sacha Sauda followers Satpal Kumar and his son Ramesh Kumar were killed at a naam charcha ghar (prayer hall) in Jagera village near Malaudh by Bagga and Shera. Satpal was also a Shiv Sena leader.

On 15 July 2017, Sultan Masih, a pastor at Temple of God church in Ludhiana, was shot dead by Bagga and Shera who fired multiple shots killing him on the spot.

On 17 October 2017, RSS and Bharatiya Janata Party leader Ravinder Gosai was shot dead in Ludhiana by Bagga and Shera. He was the RSS regional leader of Ludhiana. In the escape Shera and Bagga avoided all CCTV cameras. The bike used in the killing had been stolen a week later and would be found abandoned by police.

On 23 October 2017, police put a reward of 5,000,0000 rupees and a job as Sub-Inspector for information to solve the killings.

After a massive manhunt in November 2017 Shera and Bagga were arrested by police which brought the killings to an end.

=== Official KLF leadership ===
Harminder Singh Nihang died on 18 April 2018, at Patiala jail due to heart attack. Harmeet would become the official chief of KLF after.

On 18 November 2018, a grenade attack occurred at a Nirankari prayer hall in Adliwal, Amritsar. The blast claimed 3 lives including 1 preacher and left over 20 injured. Following the 1978 Sikh–Nirankari clash, which saw 13 Sikh killed and 150 injured, Nirankari were expelled by the Akal Takht out of the Sikh fold and became a target of attacks. The Chief Minister of Punjab, Amarinder Singh, put a reward of 5,000,000 rupees for information on the perpetrators. The Punjab Police arrested three perpetrators responsible for the blast. After the arrest, it was found out that the perpetrators had links with Harmeet.

In the aftermath of the attack, at the request of the NIA, the Home Ministry banned KLF under the Unlawful Activities Prevention Act.

In October 2019 Interpol issued a Red Notice on Harmeet at the request of India.

== Assassination ==
Happy was murdered at Dera Chahal Gurdwara, near Lahore in Pakistan on 27 January 2020. There have been varying reports on the cause and killer of Harmeet. According to some Indian media Harmeet was killed over an affair while other media outlets say Harmeet was killed over a financial dispute. Others have speculated Harmeet was killed by R&AW or ISI. A police spokesperson when asked about Harmeet's fainted ignorance claimed they had no knowledge of such an incident. Harmeet's parents requested his body so they could perform the final rites, but Pakistan didn't comply. No FIR was registered by police in Lahore over Harmeet's murder. Harmeet was cremated with only a few attending the creamtion. The NIA failed to provide a death verification report for Harmeet. He would be succeeded by Avtar Singh Khanda.
