= NeverForget84.com =

Khalistan promoting website

NeverForget84
- NeverForget84.com logo from early 2005
- Founded: 15 January 2005; 21 years ago
- Dissolved: June 2018
- Key people: Jagtar Singh Johal
- Website: neverforget84.com (defunct)

NeverForget84.com, written-out in prose as Never Forget '84, was a Khalistani-affiliated Sikh website that covered the 1984 Operation Blue Star military operation and the personal stories of Sikh militants. Indian media outlets had described the website as being "a popular hub of radical Sikh voices".

== Name ==
"Never Forget 1984" is one of the most commonly used slogans related to the Khalistan movement at diasporic Sikh events, such as at Yuba City, California.

== History ==
The website claimed to have been launched on 15 January 2005. The website covered the biographies of Sikh militants that were involved in the Punjab Insurgency. It contained a media library that contained exclusive photographs and videos related to the Khalistan movement. It was reported that NeverForget84 had been involved in rehabilitation projects in the Punjab, such as helping the families of slain Sikh militants, by rebuilding familial homes of "Sikh shaheeds" and claimed "victims of state-oppression". The website contained content related to 8,000 Sikh victims of the 1984 anti-Sikh pogroms.

In May 2015, it was reported that the Facebook page of the website had been banned. However, the main website was still accessible in India at the time of the Facebook page's banning.

The Print reported in December 2017 that the website was operated by Jagtar Singh Johal, a British-Sikh currently incarcerated in India. Dinkar Gupta (DGP intelligence, Punjab) claimed that after creating NeverForget84.com, Johal would launch another pro-Khalistani website called 1984Tribute.com. Ananya Gautam (IG, counter intelligence, Punjab Police) claims that Jaggi was being assisted by a relative of Gursharan Bir to operate his websites. Gursharan Bir is a wanted-suspect of the murder of Rashtriya Sikh Sangat leader Rulda Singh in Patiala in 2009.

Gurpreet Singh Johal, brother of Jagtar Singh Johal, reported to the BBC that Jagtar had conducted research and provided translations on behalf of the website. Jaggi's lawyer Jaspal Singh Manjhpur claims Jaggi was arrested because he operated a website covering the anti-Sikh riots and that he translated Punjabi content into English that was "exposing the deeds of the Punjab Police" globally. Sikh activists claim that Jagtar was spreading awareness amongst the Sikh youth about the events of 1984 through the website, which is why he was targeted by the police.

The website is now defunct and has been no-longer operational since June 2018.

== Scholarly analysis ==
According to Conner Singh VanderBeek, Khalistani-affiliated websites like NeverForget84, such as Khalistan.net, could be found in the early decades of the Internet but are increasingly rare due to being buried or wiped-off the Internet since then, with many former websites shutting-down since then. Thus, openly pro-Khalistani voices on the Internet are increasingly overtaken by anti-Khalistani ones. Canadian and Indian media outlets criticize pro-Khalistani Internet content.

Axel Brian describes that these Khalistani websites were responsible for distributing images of Sikhs allegedly tortured by the Indian state across the Internet. However, VanderBeek observes that the images circulated by Khalistani websites can be found in the Central Sikh Museum of the Golden Temple complex in Amritsar, throughout the langar halls of gurdwaras worldwide, and are displayed at pro-Khalistani nagar kirtan processions held in the U.K. and North America. As a result, Khalistani imagery has migrated off of the Internet into the real-world and have reached popular Sikh conscience.

Furthermore, these websites distributed the testimonies of survivors. Axel describes the ecosystem of the early Internet's Khalistani websites as a "mediascape" which "circulates photographs of tortured Sikh male bodies." This has an effect of creating an image of a "basic Sikh subject" (typically a Punjabi Sikh male with a turban and beard) who is denied their homeland (a "Khalistan"), with the body of the Sikh being violated serving as symbolism for the "violent oppression" of Sikhs allegedly carried out by the Indian government and its security agencies. Axel gives credit to the Internet for the proliferation of Khalistan-related image repertoires and ideology.
