= Gaurav Yadav (police officer) =

Indian police officer

Director General of Punjab Police
- Incumbent
- Assumed office 4 July 2022
- Appointed by: Governor of Punjab
- Preceded by: V.K. Bhawara

Personal details
- Born: 16 April 1969 (age 57) Amritsar, Punjab, India
- Occupation: IPS Officer
- Awards: Police Medal for Meritorious Service; President’s Police Medal for Distinguished Service
- Police career
- Department: Punjab Police
- Service years: 1992–Present
- Rank: Director General of Police
- Badge no.: RR 19921003

Gaurav Yadav (born 16 April 1969) is an Indian Police Service (IPS) officer of 1992 batch. He is current Director General of Police, Punjab.

== Early life ==
Yadav is originally from Jaunpur of Uttar Pradesh, his father Colonel Bhagwati Prasad Yadav (retired) was an Indian Army officer, Yadav has a B.E., M.E., M.A. (Police Administration) and PhD degrees. In 1992 he was a successful candidate for Indian Civil Services and opted for Indian Police Service. He was the all over best Probationer Cadet of 45 RR batch of Indian Police Service, year 1992. He is the son-in-law of P.C. Dogara who is former DGP of Punjab Police

== Career ==
Yadav has been the DGP of Punjab Police since July 2022 and has headed the Intelligence Wing of Punjab Police during 2016-17 and was Special Principal Secretary to Chief Minister Bhagwant Mann before becoming the head of the state police. Mr. Yadav, a 1992-batch Indian Police Service (IPS) officer, currently serves as the Director General of Police (DGP) in Punjab. In February 2025, the Appointments Committee of the Cabinet (ACC) empanelled him for the position of Director General (DG) in a central police organisation or agency, making him the only officer from the 1992 batch to receive this distinction.
