= Avtar Singh Khanda =

Khalistani activist (died 2023)

- Born: Moga, Punjab, India
- Died: 15 June 2023; City Hospital, Birmingham, England
- Occupation: 9th Jathedar of Khalistan Liberation Force

Avtar Singh Khanda (died 15 June 2023) was a Sikh activist raised in Moga, Punjab, India and living in the United Kingdom.

== Death and investigation ==
He died in City Hospital, Birmingham on 15 June 2023, aged 35, following a diagnosis of acute myeloid leukemia. Doubts were raised about the circumstances of his death in light of allegations surrounding the involvement of the Indian government in the murder of Hardeep Singh Nijjar, another Khalistani separatist. Khanda's father Kulwant Singh Khukhrana, a well known Khalistani died when Avtar was a few years old. Widely reported attributed his decline, from apparent health to hospitalization and death within days, to poisoning. The West Midland Police concluded there were "no suspicious circumstances" surrounding his death. The Government of India has denied any involvement in his death.

Khanda's family, represented by the barrister Michael Polak, have called for an inquest to be held.
