= Harminder Singh Nihang =

Sikh militant (1967–2018)

- Preceded by: Dr. Pritam Singh Sekhon
- Succeeded by: Harmeet Singh

7th Jathedar of Khalistan Liberation Force
- In office 2009 – 18 April 2018

Personal details
- Born: April 1967 village Dalli Jalandhar, Punjab, India
- Died: 18 April 2018 (aged 51) Patiala central Jail, Punjab, India
- Nickname: Mintoo

Harminder Singh Nihang (April 1967 – 18 April 2018), also known as Harminder Singh Mintoo, was a prominent Sikh militant and the 7th leader of Khalistan Liberation Force. Nihang was instrumental in reinvigorating the Khalistan Movement in the 21st century. Nihang died in police custody.

== Early life ==
Nihang was born in April 1967 at Dalli village city Bhogpur Jalandhar district, Punjab. In the 1980s Nihang's family moved to Goa.

== Early militancy ==
Nihang joined Babbar Khalsa led by Wadhwa Singh Babbar in the 90's.

In May 2007, Ram Rahim was accused of hurting the religious sentiments of the Sikhs by wearing in an advertisement attire resembling the tenth and final living Sikh Guru Gobind Singh, by using a turban with a kalgi (egret feather). Sikh militant groups began multiple attacks against Ram Rahim for this. On 2 February 2008, Nihang masterminded an attack on the head of Dera Sacha Sauda Ram Rahim. Ram Rahim was attacked with an RDX laced bomb ted to a truck. Ram Rahim escaped unhurt, but 11 followers were injured with 2 seriously injured. A co-conspirator in the attack, Bakshish Singh, fled to Malaysia with the help of Nihang.

== Chief of Khalistan Liberation Force ==
In 2009 Nihang left Babbar Khalsa and revived Khalistan Liberation Force becoming its new chief.

On 28 July 2009, KLF attacked Rashtriya Sikh Sangat (A wing of Rashtriya Swayamsevak Sangh) President Rulda Singh. He would die in August of the same year.

The same day KLF assassinated Dera Sacha Sauda, Srisa Manager Lilly Kumar in Ludhiana. Kumar was shot by 4 KLF members on motorcycles. Kumar was involved in clashes with Sikh.

On 31 October 2009, KLF assassinated 1984 anti-Sikh riots main accused Dr. Budh Parkash Kashyap on the 25th anniversary of the riots. A masked man entered Kashyap's clinic and stabbed him twice in the head and chest. Kahsyap was checking a patient when he was attacked. The 1984 anti-Sikh riots was a series of organised pogroms against Sikhs in India following the assassination of Indira Gandhi by her Sikh bodyguards.

Nihang began centering his operations in Thailand and Malaysia. In 2010 he stationed himself in Pakistan with aid from ISI. Nihang began establishing contacts and sleeper cells. From June 2013-May 2014, Nihang toured Europe establishing sleeper cells and creating contacts. While in Italy Nihang met one Hardeep Singh Shera. He stayed at Shera's place for 21 days. Nihang attempted to convince Shera to join KLF, but Shera refused. Later Shera would change his mind and contacted Nihang asking to join KLF. Nihang accepted. Nihang sent Shera to Dubai where he was trained in killing.

On 7 November 2014, Nihang was arrested at Indira Gandhi International Airport in Delhi during his return from Thailand. He was wanted in 10 terror cases at the time. Harmeet Singh took over as acting chief of KLF in his place.

== Militancy from jail ==
Nihang, despite being in jail, masterminded targeted killings, through a phone, of Dera Sacha Sauda, RSS, and Shiv Sena members and leaders with Harmeet. Harmeet recruited Shera and Ramandeep Singh Bagga to carry out the killings. They were trained by Harmeet, and after each killing would flee the country.

On 13 April 2015, Nihang's close associates shot Shiv Sena Punjab secretary Harvinder Soni in the stomach at 8:30 am in Fish Park. Soni managed to survive the attack. Soni had been on the hit list of militants since 2012 when he was accused of assaulting Sikh youth.

In July 2015, Khalistan Liberation Force mailed letters to seven Shiv Sena leaders including Sanjeev Ghanauli, Rajeev Tandon, Rakesh Arora, Amit Arora, Rubal Sandhu, Sachin Ghanauli, and Rajesh Palta that gave a last warning for them to leave Punjab.

On 3 August 2015, president of the Punjab wing of Akhil Bharatiya Hindu Suraksha Samiti, Manish Sood, was killed. He was shot dead by his guard. Hindu leaders claimed KLF paid the guard to kill Sood. They claimed Sood had been receiving death threats from KLF after he attempted to attack Jagtar Singh Hawara while Hawara was heading to court. Sood had previously pulled down posters showing Jarnail Singh Bhindranwale. Police denied KLF being involved. Akhil Bharatiya Hindu Suraksha Samiti, Bajrang Dal, Shiv Sena and certain BJP leaders and members made a call for bandh and shops to be closed in Sirhind to protest the killing.

On 18 January 2016, Shera and Bagga on a motorcycle fired gun shots at new Kidwai Nagar Park in Ludhiana. The place was to host a Rashtriya Swayamsevak Sangh shakha (assembly) later in the day. No one was injured in the firing as the venue was vacant at the time of the attack.

On 19 January 2016, Rashtriya Swayamsevak Sangh (RSS) leader Naresh Kumar shot at and injured by Shera and Bagga at Kidwai Nagar's Shaheedi Park in Ludhiana city.

On 3 February 2016, Amit Arora, a Shiv Sena leader, was attacked by Shera and Bagga while he was sitting in his car in Ludhiana. Bagga fired, but missed his shot. Since Shera and Bagga were missing their shots they were trained to be "perfect" at shooting.

On 23 April 2016, Durga Parsad Gupta was shot dead by Bagga and Shera in Khanna city. He was the President of Mazdoor Sena, labour wing of Shiv Sena Punjab.

On 6 August 2016, Rashtriya Swayamsevak Sangh (RSS) Punjab Vice-president and retired Brigadier, Jagdish Gagneja was shot at by Bagga and Shea in Chandigarh. He was admitted to the hospital and died on 22 September.

On 27 November 2016, Nihang escaped from maximum security Nabha jail with 5 accomplices. 15 gangsters, who were dressed as police officers, opened fire on security guards in the prison before freeing Nihang and 5 others. Nihang was recaptured a day later. The Hindustan Times described the escape as, "The daring act, the kind of which was never seen even during the heydays of militancy in Punjab, had rocked the nation."

On 14 January 2017, Amit Sharma religious preacher, president of Hindu Takht and political activist of Indian National Congress killed in Ludhiana city by Bagga and Shera.

On 24 February 2017, Dera Sacha Sauda followers Satpal Kumar and his son Ramesh Kumar were killed at a naam charcha ghar (prayer hall) in Jagera village near Malaudh by Bagga and Shera. Satpal was also a Shiv Sena leader.

On 15 July 2017, Sultan Masih, a pastor at Temple of God church in Ludhiana, was shot dead by Bagga and Shera who fired multiple shots killing him on the spot.

In September 2017 Nihang was acquitted in a case of planting bombs at the Nabha LPG bottling plant.

On 17 October 2017, RSS and Bharatiya Janata Party leader Ravinder Gosai was shot dead in Ludhiana by Bagga and Shera. He was the RSS regional leader of Ludhiana. In the escape Shera and Bagga avoided all CCTV cameras. The bike used in the killing had been stolen a week later and would be found abandoned by police.

On 23 October 2017, police put a reward of 5,000,0000 rupees and a job as Sub-Inspector for information to solve the killings.

After a massive manhunt in November 2017, Shera and Bagga were arrested by police which brought the killings to an end. Nihang would never be charged with any of the killings, because the NIA filed the chargesheet after Nihang's death.

On 6 January 2018, Nihang went on a hunger strike alleging that his life was under threat from jail authorities.

== Death ==
Nihang was imprisoned in Patiala Jail for over a year. On 18 April 2018, at 51 years old, Nihang died in his cell, according to jail officials. Reports say that Nihang died due to cardiac arrest, but others have questioned this claim. Nihang was succeeded by Harmeet Singh.
