= Avinder Singh Brar =

Indian police officer

Avinder Singh Brar was an Indian Police Service officer who was killed by suspected militants in 1987 in Punjab, India. At the time of his death, he was senior superintendent of police of Patiala. He was awarded Padma Shri in 1988.

He studied at St. George's College, Mussoorie and at Delhi University's St Stephen's College. He was a keen swimmer and held a national record in the 100 m breaststroke. He was awarded the Asiad Jyoti for organising the swimming events at the Asian Games in New Delhi. He had a wife, Sukhdeep, an IAS officer, and two children: a three-year-old son and a one-year-old daughter.
