= Gandiwind =

- village
- Country: India
- State: Punjab
- District: old Amritsar . new Trantaran

Area
  - Total: 4.54 km^{2} (1.75 sq mi)

Population
  - Total: 6,000
  - Density: 1,300/km^{2} (3,400/sq mi)

Languages
  - Official: Punjabi
- Time zone: UTC+5:30 (IST)
- PIN: 143414
- Telephone code: 1852
- Vehicle registration: 02 or 46
- Nearest city: Amritsar and Trantaran
- Sex ratio: 100/90 ♂/♀
- Literacy: 90%%
- Lok Sabha constituency: Khadoor sahib
- Vidhan Sabha constituency: Tarn taran
- Climate: hot in summer -cold in winter (Köppen)

Gandiwind is located in the southwest part of Amritsar district of the Indian state of Punjab.

Gandiwind is a village near the Pakistani border (6 km) and some famous singers, namely Satnam Sagar, Janta Gill & Pargat Singh Gill reside here. This village is also located very near to another village "Dhattal". So, it is also known as Gandiwind-Dhattal. This village was also the home village of Baba Bhoa Ji, who was martyrd in the battle of Amritsar. It is a tradition to cook the meal "Ahoke" on every Sunday in the village.
