= All-India Sikh Students' Federation =

Students organization affiliated to Indian Sikhs

- Official logo
- Founded: 13 September 1944
- Ideology: Sikhism
- Position: Sikh-centric

The All-India Sikh Students' Federation (AISSF) is a Sikh student organisation and political organisation in India. AISSF was formed in 1943. as the youth wing of the Akali Dal, which is a Sikh political party in the Indian Punjab.

== Origin ==
Before the federation came into being, Sikh youths were organized into local Bhujangi Sabhas in schools and colleges across the Punjab region that promoted Sikh values, heritage and social service. The actual origin of the Sikh Student Federation can be traced back to "Khalsa clubs" established in 1888. The club came to be known as the Sikh Naujawan' Association, whose first president was Harnam Singh. Although small in size and activity, the association published the Khalsa Naujawan' Magazine and sponsored work on religious and social projects. Sikh youths were an integral part of organizations such as the Shiromani Gurudwara Prabandhak Committee, Shiromani Akali Dal and the All India Students Federation.

== After partition ==
In March 1984, due to the rise in Punjab Insurgency, the Indian government banned the AISSF, and jailed many of its members. During the Operation Bluestar in June 1984, members of the AISSF were involved in the fighting between the Indian army and Sikh militants at the Golden Temple. AISSF members were also involved in an armed confrontation during Operation Black Thunder with police and paramilitary forces at the temple in April 1986. The ban on AISSF was lifted 11 April 1985.

In April 1986, the AISSF was split into two groups, one Manjit Singh faction aligned with the United Akali Dal (a militant faction of the Akali Dal), and the second Gurjit faction aligned itself with the Damdami Taksal (a Sikh religious school). The members of the AISSF have called for the creation of a separate Sikh state, "Khalistan". More than 16 militant Sikh groups have emerged in 1980s in support of the Khalistan Movement. Major militant groups included the Khalistan Commando Force (KCF) and the Khalistan Liberation Force (KLF). The KLF acts as an umbrella group which is linked politically to the Manjit Singh faction of the AISSF, and reported as an armed wing of the AISSF. The Khalistan Commando Force had emerged as the main militant group in Punjab, according to an article in India Today, and is "closely linked to the Gurjit faction of the AISSF and the Damdami Taksal." In July 1989, Manjit Singh, the president of the AISSF was released from Sangrur jail in Punjab after spending five years. He is allegedly still a supporter of militants trying to establish Khalistan.

Karnail Singh Peer Mohammad was the president of All India Sikhs Students Federation since 19 January 1995. He resigned from his designation in 2019, citing the need to bring young leaders forward for betterment of Sikh panth and its values. The organization is aimed at demanding justice for the victims of the 1984 Sikh genocide, and also focuses on other issues facing the Sikh community. The organization under the leadership of President Karnail Singh Peer Mohammad has worked for issues of Punjab and defending the values of Sikhism. The organization has recently worked on SYL Water issue for Punjab Satnam Singh Gambhir was president of All India Sikh Students Federation's Bihar-Jharkhand unit.

On an Annual Session of AISSF, Karnail Singh declared to resign from his office and hand over the reins of AISSF to students by 14 March 2017 in the presence of Sri Guru Granth Sahib Ji. He abolished the organisational structure and formed a students ad-hoc committee. A special session of AISSF was called upon by the student ad-hoc committee on 9 April, which decided for retirement of Karnail Singh Peer Mohammad and Jagroop Singh Cheema from their offices and for basic membership of AISSF by declaring it under a complete Sikh youth student body. A constitutional committee under the command of Bhai Anmoldeep Singh restructured the AISSF and drafted a new constitution of the student body.

On 13 September 2022 All-India Sikh Students’ Federation celebrated its 78th Foundation Day. Abiding by SAD chief Sukhbir Badal's five-member unity committee having Virsa Singh Valtoha, Rajinder Singh Mehta, Karnail Singh Peer Mohammad, Amarjit Singh Chawla and Gurcharan Singh Grewal as their members, the AISSF dissolved its organisational structure. The Akal Takht Jathedar Giani Harpreet Singh had given a call to the splinter factions to join hands for the propagation of Sikhism, both politically and religiously.

The 79th anniversary of the founding of the All India Sikh Students Federation (AISSF) was marked with an event held at Gurdwara Sri Guru Singh Sabha located at Guru Nanak Mission Chowk. During the event, three resolutions were adopted. The first resolution called upon the government to restrict the recruitment of individuals from outside the Punjab region for government positions within the state. Additionally, there was a demand for the transfer of management of the Bhakra Beas Management Board (BBMB) to Punjab. The members also addressed concerns related to the release of Sikh prisoners and measures to combat drug addiction.

== Sikh Students Federation factions ==
The Sikh Students Federation formed in 1944 is now divided into various factions.

- Sikh Students Federation led by Parmjeet Singh Gazi. It was reorganized in 2001 and Sewak Singh, a Student from Punjabi University was elected as president. After Sewak Singh, Mandhir Singh headed the organization until 2007 January. Later Parmjeet Singh alias Gazi, a student of higher studies in law at Punjabi University Patiala, became the president of the organization.
- All India Sikh Students Federation formerly led by Karnail Singh Peer Mohammad.
- United Sikh Students Federation currently led by Jugraj Singh Majhail, was formed in 2019 in an effort to unite various student groups and eliminate the politics associated with current student federations. Uniquely, this faction requires its members to be students, following the original requirements of the Federation. Branches currently exist within India and the US.
- Sikh Students Federation (Grewal-Mann) faction led by Samarjeet Singh Mann and Gurcharan Singh Grewal as its president.
    - Sikh Students Federation (Bajrur) faction led by Preetpal Singh Haveli as its President

== See also ==
- Akhil Bharatiya Vidyarthi Parishad
- National Students' Union of India
