= Peer Mohammad =

Pir Mohamad
- village
- Location in Punjab, India Pir Mohamad (India)
- Coordinates: 31.0650656°N 75.0465123°E
- Country: India
- State: Punjab
- District: Firozpur
- Tehsil: Zira
- Elevation: 206 m (676 ft)

Population (2011)
  - Total: 2,392
- Time zone: UTC+5:30 (IST)
- 2011 census code: 34252

Peer Mohammad is a village in the Firozpur district of Punjab, India. It is located in the Zira tehsil.

== Demographics ==
According to the 2011 census of India, Peer Mohammad has 415 households. The effective literacy rate (i.e. the literacy rate of population excluding children aged 6 and below) is 65.06%.

Demographics (2011 Census)
	Total	Male	Female
Population	2392	1218	1174
Children aged below 6 years	291	153	138
Scheduled caste	1225	611	614
Scheduled tribe	0	0	0
Literates	1367	760	607
Workers (all)	698	621	77
Main workers (total)	512	461	51
Main workers: Cultivators	291	278	13
Main workers: Agricultural labourers	71	62	9
Main workers: Household industry workers	7	5	2
Main workers: Other	143	116	27
Marginal workers (total)	186	160	26
Marginal workers: Cultivators	15	14	1
Marginal workers: Agricultural labourers	137	122	15
Marginal workers: Household industry workers	0	0	0
Marginal workers: Others	34	24	10
Non-workers	1694	597	1097
