= Lakhan Kalan =

- Village
- Location in Punjab, India Lakhan Kalan (India)
- Coordinates: 31.430087°N 75.416992°E
- Country: India
- State: Punjab
- District: Kapurthala

Government
  - Type: Panchayati raj (India)
  - Body: Gram panchayat

Population (2011)
  - Total: 3,593
- Sex ratio 1852/1741♂/♀

Languages
  - Official: Punjabi
  - Other spoken: Hindi
- Time zone: UTC+5:30 (IST)
- PIN: 144601
- Telephone code: 01822
- ISO 3166 code: IN-PB
- Vehicle registration: PB-09
- Website: kapurthala.gov.in

Lakhan Kalan is a village in Kapurthala district of Punjab State, India. Kalan is Persian language word which means Big. It is located 9 kilometres (5.6 mi) from Kapurthala, which is both district and sub-district headquarters of Lakhan Kalan. The village is administrated by a Sarpanch, who is the elected representative of the area as per the constitution of India and Panchayati raj (India).

== Demography ==
According to the report published by Census India in 2011, Lakhan Kalan has total number of 667 houses and population of 3,593 of which include 1,852 males and 1,741 females. Literacy rate of Lakhan Kalan is 72.41%, lower than state average of 75.84%. The population of children under the age of 6 years is 393 which is 10.94% of total population of Lakhan Kalan, and child sex ratio is approximately 889, higher than state average of 846.

== Population data ==
Particulars	Total	Male	Female
Total No. of Houses	667	-	-
Population	3,593	1,852	1,741
Child (0-6)	393	500	185
Schedule Caste	1,454	743	711
Schedule Tribe	0	0	0
Literacy	72.41 %	77.19 %	67.35 %
Total Workers	1,323	1,052	271
Main Worker	1,175	0	0
Marginal Worker	148	60	88

== Air travel connectivity ==
The closest airport to the village is Sri Guru Ram Dass Jee International Airport.
