= Punjab Police (India) =

Law enforcement organisation in and for Punjab, India

- Emblem of the Punjab Police
- Abbreviation: PP
- Motto: ਸ਼ੁਭ ਕਰਮਨ ਤੇ ਕਬਹੁੰ ਨ ਟਰੋਂ Shubh karman te kabhun na taron "May I never ever shirk from doing good deeds"

Agency overview
- Formed: 1861
- Employees: 80,000
- Annual budget: ₹11,557 crore (US$1.2 billion) (2026–27 est.)

Jurisdictional structure
- Operations jurisdiction: Punjab, IN
- Map of Punjab Police's jurisdiction
- Governing body: Government of Punjab, India
- General nature: Local civilian police

Operational structure
- Elected officer responsible: Bhagwant Mann, Minister of Home Affairs
- Agency executives: Gaurav Yadav (IPS), Director General of Police; Sanjeev Kalra (IPS), Director General of Police (Home Guard); Gaurav Yadav (IPS), Director General of Police (Special Administration); Prabodh Kumar (IPS), Director General of Police (Human Rights Commission); S Parmar (IPS), Legal Division of the Punjab Police, Human Rights Commission Special Administration Special Operations

Facilities
- Patrol cars: 3,080

Notables
- Anniversary: October, 21st

Website
- punjabpolice.gov.in

The Punjab Police (PP) is the police agency responsible for law enforcement and investigations within the state of Punjab, India. The Punjab Police has a broad array of specialised services, including the prevention and detection of crime, maintenance of law and order and the enforcement of the Constitution of India. Its headquarters are located at Jan Marg, Chandigarh. On 7 September 2011, Punjab Police started a video conferencing service to redress problems of NRIs. The present DGP of the Punjab Police is Gaurav Yadav. He is an Indian Police Service (IPS) officer of the 1992 batch.

== History ==
Under the Mughal Empire, policing was organized on the basis of land tenure. Zamindars were responsible for apprehending disturbers of the public peace and performing other policing duties. At the village level, these functions were performed by the village headman. In large towns, functionaries known as kotwals combined law enforcement, municipal administration and revenue collection. Watchmen were on patrol and violent, organized crime was usually handled by the military. The old mohalladari system was reintroduced with each mahallah, or neighborhood subdivision, placed under the charge of one of its members. The office of Kotwal, or prefect of police, was conferred upon a Muslim, Imam Bakhsh. The modern system of policing was introduced during British rule. The British administration relieved the zamindars of responsibility for police service, and introduced magistrates with darogas and other subordinate officers. The Punjab Police was organized in two branches: the Military Preventive Police and the Civil Detective Police. This arrangement proved unsatisfactory, however, and the government of British India urged the government of Punjab to investigate the province's system of policing in 1860. Due to the importance of the issue, the central government appointed a commission to investigate policing in British India. The Calcutta Police Commission of 1860 recommended abolition of the police's military arm, the appointment of an Inspector General of Police in the province and the supervision of police in a district by a District Superintendent. The commission recommended that only the district magistrate should conduct law-enforcement functions. Based on the commission's recommendations, the government of India submitted a bill which was enacted as Act V of 1861; the Police Act of 1861 was adopted. The organizational structure of the act still survives. The Punjab Police Rules of 1933 documented the police practices of the time, and introduced measures for improving administration and operational effectiveness. The rules indicate that the Punjab Police was a professional police organization by 1934, had considerable knowledge of the province's crime and criminals, and developed effective procedures and practices for dealing with various kinds of criminal activity. The force's administrative and disciplinary functions were also described. They have been the model for similar rules in other provinces of Pakistan, and are still in force.

After the Indian independence, the Punjab police was initially responsible for the protection of the Indo-Pakistan border as well as the Indo-Chinese borders before the BSF and ITBP were created.

== Rapid Rural Police Response System ==
Punjab is the first state of India to have a Rapid Rural Police Response System which provides City PCR-like response service in rural areas. As the Punjab Police adopted the Computer-Aided-Dispatch (CAD) system for Dial 112 system, 289 four-wheelers and 724 GPS fitted motorcycles are being used.

== Punjab Highway Patrol ==
The Punjab Police has a global positioning system (GPS) tracker and a vehicle registration search device, equipped with highway patrol vehicles.

== Crime Investigation Agency ==
The Crime Investigation Agency or CIA staff is a special branch of the Punjab Police. The crucial or unsolved criminal cases like smuggling, kidnapping, narcotics, terrorism and murder are handed over to them. This branch of the police is known for its ways of interrogating the culprit who committed the crime.

== Night policing scheme ==
Punjab is the first state in the country to launch a night policing scheme with an independent cadre, command and structure of a 4,000 strong police force for prevention of offences at night time.

== Punjab Bureau of Investigation ==
The Punjab Bureau of Investigation was set up in 2019 with 4521 dedicated new posts. Punjab is the first state of India to form a Bureau of Investigation, and separated law and order duties from investigation functions by bringing all investigation staff of 7,772 under a unified wing command.

The Bureau of Investigation investigates civil and criminal cases registered at various police stations and is equipped with:

- Mobile forensic evidence collection units
- Regional forensic science labs
- Modern cyber-crime unit
- Modern interview rooms
- Modern women police stations in all districts

== Training centres ==
- Police Recruits Training Centre (PRTC), Jahan Khelan
- Punjab Police Academy (PPA), Phillaur
- Recruit Training Centre, PAP, Jalandhar
- Commando Training Centre (CTC), Bahadurgarh, Patiala
- In-Service Training Centre, Kapurthala

== Armed battalions ==
- Punjab Armed Police
- India Reserve Battalions
- Punjab Commando Police

The headquarters of the Punjab Armed Police are located at Jalandhar while the India Reserve Battalions are stationed at Sangrur, Amritsar, Patiala, Ludhiana and Jalandhar and the Punjab Commando Police at Bahadurgarh (Patiala) and S.A.S. Nagar Mohali.

== Weapons and equipment ==
The Punjab Police was equipped with the INSAS, AK-47, AK-56 and other guns, but modernisation with advanced weapons is now taking place.

== Vehicles ==
The Punjab Police has 3083 vehicles and patrol cars like the Mahindra Scorpio Getaways and Maruti Gypsys. The PP also has motorcycles equipped with GPS and multi-utility vehicles equipped with GPS and CCTV cameras.

== Cyber Crime Cell Punjab ==
The Punjab Police has a dedicated cybercrime cell to deal with cybercrime in the state headed by an ADGP-ranked police officer, having an office in Phase 4, S.A.S Nagar.

== Punjab SWAT ==
The Punjab Police Special Weapons and Tactics (SWAT) team was formed in 2010. The officers are usually tasked with protection duties. They are highly trained on the lines of the National Security Guard by Israel's Mossad through private company Athena Security, deployed by the Punjab Government. All the commandos are under 28 years of age, thus making them fit and capable of tasks meant for commandos. Their main work is to fight against any terrorist attack if it occurs in Punjab. They have been trained exclusively in Krav Maga, room intervention, close and open techniques and other secret tactics.

The SWAT is provided with various state-of-the-art equipment and the latest technology. The teams are provided with:

- Bullet-resistant transport
- Lightweight bullet-resistant jackets and helmets
- Hands-free radio sets
- Complete anti-trauma bodysuit with level-2 protection
- Riot control helmet
- Gas masks
- Shock shields
- Laser weapons
- Gas guns
- Pepper gun launcher

Weapons

- Glock 17 pistol
- Brugger & Thomet MP9 sub machine gun
- Heckler & Koch MP5 sub machine gun
- MTAR 21 X95 assault rifle
- SIG 552 assault rifle
- AK-47 assault rifle
- Steyr SSG 69 sniper rifle
- CornerShot
- Night vision device

=== Major operation ===
The Punjab SWAT handled counter-terrorism operation at Dina Nagar Police Station in a 2015 Gurdaspur attack by killing all three suspected Lashkar-e-Taiba terrorists.

== Commemoration Day ==
Every year, 21 October is celebrated as Commemoration Day by the Punjab Police.

== Hierarchy ==
Officers

- Director General of Police (DGP)
- Special Director General of Police (Spl DGP)
- Additional Director General of Police
- Inspector General of Police (IGP)
- Deputy Inspector General of Police (DIG)
- Senior Superintendent of Police (SSP)
- Superintendent of Police (SP)
- Additional Superintendent of Police
- Assistant SP (IPS) or Deputy SP (DSP)

Sub-ordinates

- Inspector of Police
- Sub-Inspector of Police (SI)
- Assistant Sub-Inspector of Police (ASI)
- Head Constable
- Senior Constable
- Constable

== In popular culture ==
Members of the Punjab Police have been frequently portrayed in films. Some of the prominent ones are:

=== Punjabi films ===
- DSP Dev (2019)
- Jatt & Juliet 2 (2013)
- Baaz (2014)
- Mahaul Theek Hai (1999)
- Police in Pollywood (2014)
- Punjab 1984 (2014)

=== Hindi films ===
- Jo Bole So Nihaal (2005)
- Udta Punjab (2016)

== See also ==
- Law enforcement in India
- Punjab Police FC
