= List of military operations of India =

The Indian Armed Forces is the overall unified military of the Republic of India encompassing the Indian Army, the Indian Air Force and the Indian Navy. The President of India serves as the commander-in-chief of the armed forces. With an estimated total active force of 1,500,700 personnel, India maintains the world's second largest militarys, behind China and ahead of the United States.

== Army operations ==
This includes a list of Army operations, both past and ongoing operations, as well as humanitarian military operations:

=== Old operations ===
Sr. No.	Names of Operation	Year	Location	Notes
1	Operation Bison	1948	Ladakh	Assault and capture of Zoji La, Dras and Kargil district in Ladakh during the India–Pakistan war of 1947–1948
2	Operation Peace	1948	Junagadh State	Annexation of Junagadh
3	Operation Polo	1948	Hyderabad State	Indian armed forces ended the rule of the Nizam of Hyderabad and led to the incorporation of the princely state of Hyderabad in Southern India, into the Indian Union
4	Golden Temple Raid I	1955	Punjab	To curb the Punjabi Suba Morcha.
5	Operation Vijay	1961	Goa, Daman & Diu	The operation by the Military of India that led to the incorporation of Portuguese India (Goa, Daman, and Diu) into India
6	Operation Ablaze	1965	Indo-Pak Border (Western sector)	Operations by the Indian Army along the western border in May-June 1965, following Pakistani attack in the Rann of Kutch. It took place between the operations in the Rann of Kutch (Operation Kabaddi, April 1965) and Operation Gibraltar by Pakistan.
7	Operation Riddle	1965	Punjab sector	11 Corps offensive during the Indo-Pakistani War of 1965
8	Operation Nepal	1965	Sialkot sector	1 Corps offensive during the Indo-Pakistani War of 1965
9	Operation Steeplechase	1971	Red Corridor	Combined operation against Naxalites
10	Operation Cactus Lily	1971	Indo-Pak Border	Indo-Pakistani War of 1971
11	Amalgamation of Sikkim	1975	Sikkim	Indian Army disarmed and disbanded the Royal Guard of the Sikkimese King, after which Sikkim joined India as a State of India.
12	Operation Blue Star	1984	Punjab	Cleanup operation carried out at Harmandir Sahib in Amritsar, Punjab
13	Operation Woodrose	1984	Punjab	
14	Operation Meghdoot	1984	Siachen Glacier, India	The Siachen Glacier is a glacier located in the eastern Karakoram range in the Himalayas, Ladakh at about 35.421226°N 77.109540°E, just northeast of the point NJ9842.
15	Operation Shivalik	1985	Karnataka, Madhya Pradesh, Maharashtra, Himachal Pradesh, Haryana and Uttar Pradesh (mainly Terai Regions)	To capture Sikh militant leaders outside the confines of the Punjab state. 1 Sikh militant captured and detained, 38 sympathizers detained.
16	Operation Black Thunder I	1986	Punjab	Cleanup operation carried out at Harmandir Sahib in Amritsar, Punjab
17	Operation Pacification	1986	Punjab	
18	Operation Mand	1986	Punjab	To capture or kill Avatar Singh Bramha, a Sikh Militant. 1 helicopter lost, no militant detained.
19	Operation Bluebird	1987	Manipur	Indian retaliation operation to the 1987 attacks on the Assam Rifles' outpost
20	Golden Temple Raid II	1987	Punjab	Rumor that Sikh Militant Gurjit Singh was in the Golden Temple complex. Not found.
21	Operation Pawan	1987	Sri Lanka	Operations by the Indian Peace Keeping Force to take control of Jaffna from the LTTE in late 1987 to enforce the disarmament of the LTTE as a part of the Indo-Sri Lankan Accord.Operation Viraat, which occurred in 1988, after Operation Pawan, was an anti-insurgency operation launched by the IPKF against the LTTE in April 1988 in Northern Sri Lanka
22	Operation Black Thunder II	1988	Punjab	Cleanup operation carried out at Harmandir Sahib in Amritsar, Punjab
23	Operation Night Dominance	1990-1994	Punjab	To control the landscape of Punjab at night.
24	Operation Rakshak I	1990	Punjab	To curb Sikh militancy.
25	Operation Vadhi Pahar	1991	Punjab	Indian Police and Army operation to kill militant member Seetal Singh Mattewal.
26	Operation Election	1992	Punjab	To bring a secure election, did not succeed as militants boycotted election, data suggests only 21% of Punjab voted.
27	Golden Temple Raid III	1992	Punjab	To stop commemoration of the assassins of General Arun Shridhar Vaidya.
28	Operation Sarp Vinash	2003	Jammu and Kashmir	An assault on the largest system of hideouts used by insurgents in Jammu and Kashmir in which over 60 militants were killed
29	Operation Black Tornado	2008	Mumbai, Maharashtra	Against the 26/11 attacks
30	Operation All Out	2017		to flush out militants especially from the Kashmir region of Jammu and Kashmir state of India.
31	2015 Indian counter-insurgency operation in Myanmar	2015	Myanmar	Indian Army allegedly conducted hot pursuit of Naga terror outfit NSCN-Khaplang along the India-Myanmar border.
32	Operation Calm Down	2016	Jammu and Kashmir	
33	Operation Randori Behak	2020	Jammu and Kashmir	
34	Operation Devi Shakti	2021	Punjab, Haryana, Delhi, Afghanistan	To help fleeing Hindus and Sikhs from the Islamic Republic of Afghanistan.
35	Operation Ganga	2022	Ukraine	To evacuate the Indian citizens amidst the 2022 Russian invasion of Ukraine, who had crossed over to neighboring countries.
36	Operation Sindoor	2025	POK/Pakistan	To take revenge against the 2025 Pahalgam attack that killed 26 civilians.
37	Operation Sindhu	2025	Iran	To evacuate the Indian citizens amidst the 2025 Iran-Israel conflict.

=== Ongoing operations ===
Sr. No.	Name of Operation	Year	Location	Notes
1	Operation Rakshak II	1991–Present	Jammu and Kashmir, Punjab	Curb militancy.
2	Operation Goodwill	1998–present	Jammu and Kashmir	Humanitarian tasks.
3	Operation Good Samaritan		Manipur/Nagaland	Humanitarian tasks.
4	Operation All Out Kashmir	2017	Jammu and Kashmir	Curb militancy.
5	Operation Snow Leopard	2020	Ladakh	Control key heights along the LAC in eastern Ladakh.

== Navy operations ==
- Operation Vijay (1961) - Annexation of Goa
- Operation Trident (1971) - an offensive operation launched on Pakistan's port city of Karachi during the Indo-Pakistani War of 1971.
- Operation Python (1971) - Follow-up to Operation Trident on Karachi, Pakistan's port city in 1971.
- Operation Cactus (1988) - Against the coup to overthrow the Government of Maldives.
- During Operation Restore Hope (1992–2003) -
- Operation Talwar (1999) - Blockage of Karachi Port
- Operation Parakram (2001)
- During Operation Enduring Freedom (2001)
- During 2004 Indian Ocean earthquake (Operation Madath, Operation Sea Waves, Operation Castor, Operation Rainbow, Operation Gambhir & Operation Rahat-II)
- Operation Sukoon (2006) - a relief operation to evacuate Indian, Sri Lankan and Nepalese nationals, as well as Lebanese nationals with Indian spouses, from the conflict zone during the 2006 Lebanon War
- Operation Searchlight (2014) -The Search Operation Undertaken by Indian Navy to find the missing Boeing 777 M.H 17 Malaysian Flight
- Operation Raahat (2015) - Operation by the Indian Armed Forces to evacuate Indian citizens and other foreign nationals from Yemen during the 2015 military intervention by Saudi Arabia and its allies in that country during the Yemeni Crisis.
- Operation Nistar(India) (2018) - Operation by the Indian Navy using INS Sunayna to evacuate Indian citizens from Yemen Island of Socotra who were stranded by Cyclone Mekenu.
- Operation Madad (2018) - Indian Navy had launched Operation Madad, major rescue, and relief operation in flood-hit Kerala. The operation was launched to assist state administration and undertake disaster relief operations due to flooding in many parts of Kerala.
- Operation Samudra Setu (2020) - This operation was launched to bring back Indian citizens struck at overseas during COVID-19 pandemic.
- Operation Surya Hope (2013) - was the Indian Army's Central Command's response to the devastating floods in Uttarakhand in June 2013
- Operation Sankalp - Anti piracy patrols
- Operation Urja Suraksha (2026) - Protection of energy supplies during 2026 Iran war.

== Air Force Operations ==
- During World War II (1939–1945) (Main article- India during World War 2)
- During First Kashmir War (1947)
- During Congo Crisis (1961)
- During Sino-Indian War (1962)
- During Second Kashmir War (1965)
- During Bangladesh Liberation War (Operation Meghna Heli Bridge) (1971)
- Meghna Heli Bridge (1971)
- Tangail Airdrop (1971)
- Operation Meghdoot (1984)
- Operation Poomalai (1987)
- Operation Cactus (1988)
- Operation Safed Sagar (1999)
- Atlantique incident (1999)
- Operation Rahat (2013) in Uttarakhand floods
- Operation Megh Rahat (2014) in Jammu and Kashmir floods
- Operation Maitri (2015) Indian Military's rescue and relief mission in quake-hit Nepal
- Operation Sankat Mochan (India) (2016) An operation of the Indian Air Force in view of 2016 Juba Clashes to evacuate Indian Citizens and other foreign nationals from South Sudan during the South Sudanese Civil War.
- Operation Insaniyat (2017) a humanitarian assistance aimed to supply relief packages to Bangladesh for migrant Rohingya Muslims.
- Operation Bandar (2019) Operation launched by IAF to bomb the biggest Jaish-e-Mohammed terror camp in Balakot to avenge the Pulwama terror attack. In this operation almost 170-200 terrorists were killed and 45 terrorists were severely injured.
- Operation Ganga (2022) An operation by Government of India to evacuate the Indian citizens (mainly students) from Ukraine amidst the 2022 Russian invasion of Ukraine with the help of Indian Air Force and a few private airlines.
- Operation Dost (2023) Turkey and Syria earthquake.
- Operation Kaveri (2023) evacuation of Indian citizens from Sudan
- Operation Ajay(2023) evacuation of Indian national from Israel and Palestine
- Operation Sindoor(2025) was a coordinated military strike launched by India on May 7, 2025, targeting Pakistan-based terrorist camps in response to the Pahalgam terror attack that killed 26 civilians.

== See also ==
- Indian Army
- Indian Navy
- Indian Air Force
- Indian Armed Forces
