= Avtar Singh Brahma =

Sikh militant in India (1951–1988)

12th Jathedar of Damdama Sahib
- In office 1988 – 22 July 1988

Jathedar of Tat Khalsa
- Preceded by: Position established
- Succeeded by: Merged with Khalistan Liberation Force

2nd Jathedar of Khalistan Liberation Force
- Preceded by: Aroor Singh
- Succeeded by: Gurjant Singh Budhsinghwala

Personal details
- Born: 1951 Brahmpura, Punjab, India
- Died: 22 July 1988 (aged 36–37) Sri Ganganagar, Rajasthan, India
- Nickname: Brahma

Military service
- Allegiance: Khalistan Liberation Force
- Years of service: 1984–1988
- Rank: Jathedar, General
- Battles/wars: Insurgency in Punjab: Operation Mand

Avtar Singh Brahma (1951 – 22 July 1988) was a Sikh militant and one of the main founding figures and the second leader of Khalistan Liberation Force, founded in 1986, during the insurgency in Punjab, India. Avtar Singh became known for his encounters with the police, Operation Mand being particularly notable.

== Early life ==
Not much is known about Avtar Singh's early life. What is known is that he was born in 1951 in a Sandhu Jat Sikh family of village Brahampur near Tarn Taran Sahib. His family was engaged in agriculture and was very poor. He left school at an early age to work at his family farm. Avtar Singh at a young age was sent by his parents to Bidhi Chand Dal. He was brought up in the dera at Sur Singh near Amritsar. He soon took amrit and became a Khalsa. There he also became a Nihang Singh who are generally the warriors of the Sikh community. Avtar Singh Brahma was reportedly involved in the killing of police personnel accused of participating in alleged fake encounters during the Insurgency in Punjab, India period.

== Tat Khalsa ==
Following Operation Blue Star an Insurgency began in the Punjab, India. Avtar Singh created a small militant group known as the "Tat Khalsa".

Avtar Singh would take revenge in his home village for the beating of women and children.

In 1985 Avtar Singh attacked SHO (Station House Officer) Harinder Singh who managed to survive, but was injured.

One of Avtar Singh's first attacks was attacking CRPF, BSF, and Indian army convoys. Brahma would lead regular attacks on security personnel convoys.

In Baler Avtar Singh Brahma and fellow militants surrounded a CRPF jeep. CRPF men tried to flee and fight, but were killed. In retaliation for this security personnel shot and killed 2 Sikhs who they claimed were militants. Avtar Singh Brahma refuted these claims saying they were innocent Sikhs of the village.

In 1986 Avtar Singh killed the Thander (Assistant Sub-Inspector) of Chohla Sahib, Shiv Singh. Shiv Singh was unpopular as he used excessive force and had no respect for the locals. The locals were supporters of Avtar Singh Brahma instead. Avtar Singh had created a major plot to kill Shiv Singh. He had fellow militants tell Shiv Singh his location and led Shiv Singh to believe that he was weak and could be easily captured. Shiv Singh fell for the act and went with fellow officers to arrest Avtar Singh. Avtar Singh knew of their movements and attacked them. Shiv Singh and two other officers were killed and 4 others were injured.

Avtar Singh next attacked a CRPF patrol party at Bhikhiwind killing 1 Sub-Inspector and two jawans.

Avtar Singh centred his operation in the Mand region (the Mand region is the riverbank land along the Beas). In July 1986 Operation Mand was launched to capture Avtar Singh and his fellow militants. The Operation was led by KPS Gill and was approved by DGP Julio Ribeiro. About 30 companies of security forces along with multiple helicopters, bulldozers, and mechanised boats were deployed and used for the Operation which was conducted in a over 240 square kilometre area. The Operation did not go as expected for the Indian forces. Thousands of Police and Paramilitary forces surrounded the Mand region. According to Avtar Singh, he and fellow Tat Khalsa members clashed with and repulsed an attacking force of officers and paramilitary. Avtar Singh also alleged that he shot down a Paramilitary helicopter. The other helicopters fell back after this. After Avtar Singh and fellow Tat Khalsa members managed to escape. The operation faced heavy criticism for being "overkill". The operation lasted for 40 hours. It was initially described as the destruction of the Khalistan capital, but police had only captured a few weapons. Revenue Minister Major Singh Uboke called Operation Mand "Operation Fraud". He said at a cabinet meeting, that Sikh youth and women were being harassed and tortured by the security forces.

== Khalistan Liberation Force ==
In late 1986 Aroor Singh formed the Khalistan Liberation Force which was a merger of the Tat Khalsa, Mai Bhago Regiment, Khalistan Armed Police, Dasmesh Regiment, Khalistan Security Force and others. In early 1987 Aroor Singh was arrested and brutally tortured by police. He would later be killed. Following his death Avtar Singh took over the Khalistan Liberation Force. Avtar Singh made Gurjant Singh and Pipal Singh his 2 Lieutenant-Generals

=== Brahampura incident and retaliatory attacks ===
On 27 December 1986, Avtar Singh Brahma and fellow militants challenged the Central Reserve Police Force (CRPF) to try to capture them for 20 minutes at Brahampura. Brahma also called on the CRPF men and the civilians to give up on liquor and cigarettes. The CRPF did not attempt to capture him and waited for reinforcements. Once reinforcements arrived around an hour later they smashed their way into homes and searched them in the village trying to find Avtar Singh. They were accused of committing atrocities in the search and faced heavy criticism from many leaders. Accounts by villagers also state the CRPF was responsible for multiple assaults of villagers. Punjab DGP Julio F. Riberio would admit to an "excesses" by the CRPF and apologies for it.

Avtar Singh Brahma vowed to get revenge in a letter and punish those responsible. Brahma with other KLF members, including Harbhajan Singh Mand, Anar Singh Para, and Gurdeep Singh Vakeel with Para being involved in most of the attacks, would attack multiple security force headquarters, bases, convoys, and stations in revenge.

Two weeks after the incident, on 12 January, Brahma, Pipal Singh Toofan, Para and multiple other KLF members were involved in multiple encounters with the CRPF. The encounters were described as long bloody, and fierce. The militants killed multiple CRPF men and blew up multiple vehicle and then escaped. One of Brahma's targets in the attack, a police Inspector who had killed Dalbir Singh Billa Vapral a militant, was killed by Brahma's group along with 7 other officers. Following this the militants led by Brahma killed multiple CRPF soldiers in other attacks throughout the day.

=== Following Brahampura incident ===
On 15 January 1987, Avtar Singh’s planned assassination of Lieutenant Colonel Sant Singh Bhullar was conducted. Bhullar attacked a Gurdwara in Sri Muktsar Sahib as part of Operation Blue Star. 10 KLF members with sub machine guns and pistols had broken into Bhullar’s home and killed him in a burst fire. His sister-in-law was also killed. Three others were injured. They left behind a note from Avtar Singh Brahma claiming responsibility. The note blamed Bhullar for, "..the desecration of the Sikh historic temple at Mukstar".

Avtar Singh Brahma claimed responsibility for killing Pahar Singh and his wife. Pahar was a KLF Lieutenant General. Brahma claimed that they had broken KLF’s rules and began to kill innocents as well as extorting people.

Under Avtar Singh senior KLF members launched an attack in September 1987. The target was Sub-Inspector Mith Singh. Mith Singh had been hand-picked by then chief of Punjab Police Julio F. Riberio. He was picked to deal with Avtar Singh’s Lieutenant-General Gurjant Singh Budhsinghwala. Mith Singh had been accused of police brutality and targeting Budhsinghwala’s family. Mith Singh had dragged Budhsinghwala’s father by his hair in a public humiliation. Budhsinghwala began plotting to kill Mith Singh in revenge for his actions with Husan Singh. The attack was carried out by Budshinghwala and fellow Sikh militants on 15 September 1987 at around 9 in the morning. Mith Singh was shot while he was walking along with his guard a police constable. Both of their guns were taken by Budhsinghwala. In the crossfire a schoolboy was also killed and 5 others were injured. The killing is said to have greatly alarmed Punjab Chief of Police Riberio. Mith Singh was one of his best and most loyal officers.

On 1 November 1987, Avtar Singh Brahma claimed responsibility for the killing of 2 CRPF jawans in an ambush the day before near Kabirpur.

On 6 November 1987, Brahma killed Deputy Superintendent of Police (DSP) Tara Chand. Chand was killed in the Jagraon area.

One of Brahma’s most major actions under his leadership was the killing of Senior Superintendent of Police Avinder Singh Brar and Superintendent of Police (Headquarters) KRS Gill on 14 December 1987 which was masterminded by his lieutenant Budhsinghwala.

SSP Brar and his junior, SP (HQs) KRS Gill, were both killed while jogging at Patiala's National Institute of Sports. Both of them had little security. Two men in tracksuits approached them at 7 a.m. They signaled to a third person who pulled out an AK-47 and Brar was killed. Gill attempted to flee to a police jeep, but was injured with bullets in his head and back. He would die while fleeing and fell on the ground face first. The three killers fled on a motorcycle. Brar and Gill were top officers. There killing was described as the biggest killing since that of AS Atwal in Punjab. It was also described as a big killer of police morale. Brar had been held as the best police officer. Brar had cleaned the Babbar Khalsa out of Patiala, but in doing so had been accused of committing extrajudicial executions. According to Chief of Punjab Police at the time J.F Ribeiro Brar would have become the chief of police had he not been killed.

On 22 January 1988 BJP Punjab Vice-President Khushi Ram Sharma was shot dead with 4 bullets in Ludhiana by 2 Sikh on scooters. Avtar’s Lieutenant General Budhsinghwala claimed responsibility in a letter on behalf of KLF.

On the same day 6 KLF members armed with AK-47s shot dead 12 people in a park in Barnala. 5 others were injured. One of them was a Shiv Sena worker. Avtar’s Lieutenant General Budhsinghwala claimed responsibility in a letter on behalf of KLF.

In 1988 Avtar Singh Brahma and fellow militants attacked and destroyed CRPF bases in retaliation for CRPF actions at Brahampur.

In April 1988 KLF led an attack on Gurcharan Singh Tohra and Professor Darshan Singh. Tohra was president of SGPC and Darshan was the SGPC appointed Jathedar of the Akal Takht. The attack was led by Gurjant Singh Budhsinghwala, one of Avtar Singh’s lieutenant-generals. At a SGPC meeting at Ludhiana University KLF members under Budhsinghwala snuck their way in using fake ids. They attacked and fought Tohra and Darshan’s security. 5 police officers and 8 members of Tohra and Darshan’s party were killed. No KLF member was killed but Tohra and Darshan managed to escape unhurt. A motive for attacks on Tohra could be the belief of militants that Tohra was involved in Operation Blue Star.

On 19 June 1988, under Brahma and other KLF members gunned down the head of the Punjab Shiv Sena, Ramkat Jalota. He was killed along with his gunmen and another. The Shiv Sena had used violence against Sikhs which made them targets of Sikh militants.

Avtar Singh has been reputed for never attacking civilians.

== Death and aftermath ==
Avtar Singh Brahma was killed on 22 July 1988 in Village Chak no 45 F in tehsil Sri Karanpur in District Sri Ganganagar Rajasthan. A month before his death, Brahma was appointed Jathedar of Takht Damdama Sahib. He was killed in an encounter near the Pakistan border. One source has described his death as happening in, "mysterious circumstances..." Another says that before Avtar Singh's death he, "scamper[ed] through the verdant fields of Punjab's border district on horseback." His death caused outrage among rural Sikh as he was quite popular amongst them. Avtar Singh had become known as a Robin Hood figure. He is said to have commanded respect until the end. Avtar Singh was succeeded by Gurjant Singh Budhsinghwala one of Avtar Singh's lieutenant generals.
