= Operation Samudra Maitri =

2018 Indian relief effort in Indonesia

Operation Samudra Maitri is the relief effort launched by India to assist the victims of the 2018 Sulawesi earthquake and tsunami in Indonesia. The operation was launched after communication between the Prime Minister of India Narendra Modi and President of Indonesia Joko Widodo on 1 October 2018.

== Background ==
On 28 September 2018, a shallow earthquake struck in the neck of the Minahasa Peninsula, Indonesia, with its epicentre located in the mountainous Donggala Regency, Central Sulawesi. The quake was located 77 km (48 mi) away from the provincial capital Palu and was felt as far away as Samarinda on East Kalimantan and also in Tawau, Malaysia. This event was preceded by a sequence of foreshocks, the largest of which was a magnitude 6.1 tremor that occurred earlier that day.

Following the mainshock, a tsunami alert was issued for the nearby Makassar Strait, but was called off half an hour later. A localised tsunami struck Palu, sweeping shore-lying houses and buildings on its way. The combined effects of the earthquake and tsunami led to the deaths of at least 1,407 people and injured a further 632. This makes it the deadliest earthquake to strike the country since the 2006 Yogyakarta earthquake, as well as the deadliest earthquake worldwide so far in 2018. The Indonesian Agency for Meteorology, Climatology and Geophysics (BMKG) confirmed that a tsunami had been triggered with its height reaching an estimated maximum of 4 to 7 metres (13 to 23 ft), striking the settlements of Palu, Donggala and Mamuju along its path.

== Aircraft and ships ==
A pair of Indian Air Force C-130J Hercules and Boeing C-17 transport aircraft departed on 3 October 2018 morning with medical personnel and relief material. The Indian Ministry of External Affairs informed that the C-130J was carrying a medical team along with tents and equipment to set up a field hospital, and that the C-17 aircraft was other essential items for relief. They also reported the mobilisation of Indian Navy ships INS Tir, INS Sujata and INS Shardul to join the relief operations, they are expected to reach the Central Sulawesi province of Indonesia on 6 October 2018.
