= Operation Insaniyat =

Indian aid operation in Bangladesh

The Ministry of External Affairs of India launched the Operation Insaniyat to help Bangladesh in overcoming the humanitarian crisis, due to the large influx of the Myanmar refugees to Bangladesh. Due to the Military crackdown in the Rakhine state these Rohingya Muslims fled Myanmar and turned to Bangladesh in large numbers. The aid consisteded of all the basic items which were instantly required by the distressed people at the moment such as pulses, rice, sugar, salt, cooking oil, biscuits, mosquito nets, ready to eat noodles and others.

According to the UN reports, after the clashes between the Rohingya people and the military around 3,79,000 people fled Myanmar. Also large number of people were killed in this clash and Rohingya villages were burnt in large numbers. The relief products were planned to be delivered in multiple consignments, of which the first one was delivered to south eastern port city of Chittagong on 14 Sep, 2017.

The second consignment consisted of all the items necessarily required by the Rohingya women and children living in the camps. It contained 61 tonnes of baby food, 104 tonnes of milk powder, 102 tonnes of dried fish, 50,000 raincoats and pairs of gum boots. An Amount of US $25 Million as development assistance for the Rakhine state was also declared by India in December, 2017.
