= S R K Nair =

Indian air officer

Air Marshal S R K Nair PVSM, AVSM, VM, M-in-D
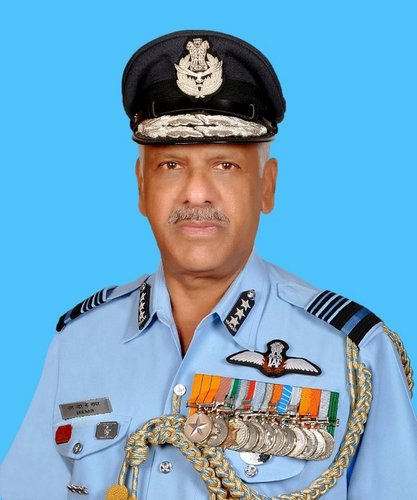
- Born: 7 July 1958 (age 68); Thiruvananthapuram, Kerala, India
- Spouse: Geethanjali Nair
- Military career
- Allegiance: India
- Branch: Indian Air Force
- Service years: June 1980 – July 2018
- Rank: Air Marshal
- Service number: 16040
- Commands: Training Command
- Awards: Param Vishisht Seva Medal; Ati Vishisht Seva Medal; Vayu Sena Medal

Air Marshal Sreedhara Panicker Radha Krishnan Nair (born 7 July 1958), PVSM, AVSM, VM, Mention in Dispatches is a retired officer of Indian Air Force who was Air Officer Commanding-in-Chief (AOC-in-C), Training Command of the Indian Air Force from 1 September 2015 to 31 July 2018. He served as a member of the Armed Forces Tribunal, Kochi, from September 2020 to September 2024.

== Early life and education ==
Nair was born on 7 July 1958 at Thiruvananthapuram, Kerala. He is an alumnus of Loyola School, Thiruvananthapuram and National Defence Academy, Pune.

== Career ==
Nair was commissioned into the transport stream of the Indian Air Force in June 1980. He has clocked over 7200 hours of flying and has experience on many different types of aircraft's including Otter, Avro, An-32, Dornier and IL-76. He held several key operational and administrative appointments at various stages of his service including Chief Operations Officer of a Transport Base; Commanding Officer of a strategic Air lift Squadron; Director Operations (Transport) at Air Headquarters; Air Officer Commanding of AFS Chandigarh; Assistant Chief of the Air Staff (Personnel Airmen and Civilians); Assistant Chief of the Air Staff (Transport & Helicopter) and Senior Air Staff Officer of Training Command.

He has also been extensively involved in many military operations including Operation Pawan, Operation Cactus, Operations Parakram and Operation Safed Sagar. As the Flight Commander, he was directly involved in initiating night operations to Leh and Thoise on the IL-76 aircraft. He has led multiple airborne exercises with foreign countries including Exercise Blue Crane in South Africa in 1999, Exercise Cooperative Cope Thunder in USA in 2003 and Russia in Exercise INDRA 2007. He captained a flight to the North Pole in an Indian Air Force (IAF) IL-76 aircraft on 20 Jun 2003, making it the first Indian aircraft to fly over the true North pole. He played a pivotal role in operationalising Daulet Beg Oldi, the highest air strip in the world, for An-32 and C-130 aircraft.

He was involved in numerous disaster relief operations during the 2001 Gujarat earthquake, Super cyclone in Orissa, 2004 Indian Ocean Tsunami, Mumbai Floods, Cyclone Katrina, China Earthquake and was the Air Force co-ordinator for Operation Rahat. He is a qualified Flying Instructor, has been an Air Force Examiner and was the Commodore Commandant of 44 Squadron (Mighty Jets). He has made significant contributions to enhance the operational capabilities of the airlift fleet of the Indian Air Force. He served the Armed Forces Tribunal as an Administrative Member at the Kochi Bench between September 2020 and September 2024.

== Awards and medals ==
During 38 years of his career, Nair has been awarded several medals: AOC-in-C Commendation, Chief of the Air Staff Commendation, GOC-in-C Commendation, Mention-in-Despatch (1999), the Vayu Sena Medal (2005), the Ati Vishisht Seva Medal (January 2010) and the Param Vishisht Seva Medal (January 2017).

== Personal life ==
He is married to Geethanjali Nair and their daughter Karthika Nair (Director & Head of Operations, Praesedia Biotherapeutics Pvt. Ltd.) is married to Manu Balachandran, Deputy Editor, Fortune India.

Military offices
Preceded by Ramesh Rai	Air Officer Commanding-in-Chief, Training Command; 1 September 2015 - 31 July 2018	Succeeded by Rakesh Kumar Singh Bhadauria
Preceded by Chandrashekharan Hari Kumar	Senior Air Staff Officer - Southern Air Command; 1 May 2014 - 31 August 2015	Succeeded by Raghunath Nambiar
Preceded by Subramanyam Sukumar	Deputy Chief of the Air Staff; 1 March 2014 - 30 April 2014	Succeeded by Shyam Bihari Prasad Sinha
