= Operation Surya Hope =

Indian Army response to the 2013 North India floods

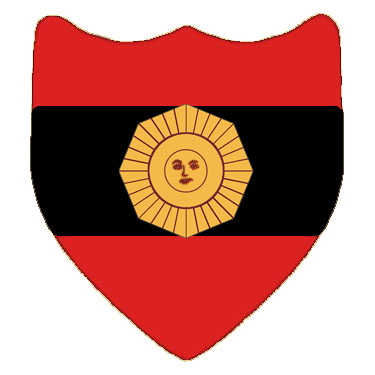
Surya, Central Command's emblem

Operation Surya Hope was the Indian Army’s Central Command response to the June 2013 North India floods in Uttarakhand.

The Uttarakhand flood was caused by record off-season monsoon rains, cloud burst, floods, flash floods, and glacial lake outburst floods (GLOFs), which were possibly induced by climate change. The humanitarian disaster affected millions, stranded over 100,000 pilgrims and tourists in Himalayan religious sites, and killed several thousand people. The Indian Army's Lucknow based Central Command conducted the operation. Surya or Sun, is the emblem of the Central Command and features prominently on the Command's formation sign and flag, which is probably why Central Command chose to name the effort Operation Surya Hope.

Operation Surya Hope was the follow-up to Operation Ganga Prahar. The operation was commanded by Lieutenant General Anil Chait, the General Officer Commanding in Chief (GOC in C) of Central Command. He was succeeded by Lieutenant General Rajan Bakhshi on 1 July 2013. Soon after assuming command, Bakhshi said that the Army would continue with the relief operations, and that he would soon visit Uttarakhand. Over 10,000 troops participated in Operation Surya Hope. It was conducted in arrangement with efforts from the Indian Air Force (IAF) (Operation Rahat), Border Road Organization, National Disaster Response Force (NDRF), Indo-Tibetan Border Police (ITBP) and other para military forces under the Ministry of Home.

The floods and landslides in Uttarakhand was considered by many as the worst natural disaster in the area in a hundred years. The Government of India classifies the disaster as a tsunami. India Meteorological Department (IMD) states that the total rainfall in Uttarakhand from 1 to 18 June 2013 totaled to 385.1 mm, the highest in the last 80 years. The normal rainfall during the period is 71.3 mm, making the total 440% larger than the normal.

== Early warning ==
India has an elaborate multi-tier and multi-agency natural disaster and flood Early Warning (EW) system, both at the Central and the State levels. Federal nodal agencies responsible for providing EW are:

- Floods – Central Water Commission
- Landslide hazard – Geological Survey of India (GSI)
- Avalanche – Defence Research & Development Organization (DRDO)
- Disaster Management Support (DMS) – Indian Space Research Organization (ISRO)
- Weather- India Metrological Department (IMD).

Out of all the agencies above, only the India Meteorological Department warned of the tsunami that struck Uttarakhand in June 2013. The Central Water Commission, under the Union Ministry of Water Resources, made its first flood forecast for the year for Uttarakhand after the event on 18 June which impacted Rishikesh and Haridwar. The IMD's warnings had little effect, and few moved to safer places. Both the state and central government ignored the early warning. The State Government didn't issue any form of advisory to the residents or the pilgrims in the affected areas. Uttarakhand Chief Secretary Subhash Kumar also dismissed the IMD advisory.

== Organizations ==
The area of responsibility for the humanitarian assistance mission included the heavily flood affected areas of Uttarakhand, Himachal Pradesh, and Uttar Pradesh. The mission boundary in the north runs along the India-Tibet border, in the east it runs along the India Nepal border, and in the west it goes up to the western boundary of the Garhwal Division. The areas covered by the mission included Uttarkashi, Chamoli, Rudraprayag Badrinath, Hemkund Joshimath, Harsil, Gauchar, Kedarnath Kedarghati, Rajakhet, Koti Tehri, Gauri Kund, in the Garhwal Division, Dharchula, the Pithoragarh district, and the Kumaon Division.

=== Disaster management and disaster preparedness ===
In India's federal system, the state government holds the responsibility for disaster management. The national government plays a ‘supporting role’. The ‘nodal Ministry’ in the central government for management of natural disasters, is the Ministry of Home Affairs (MHA). In the MHA this function is discharged by the Disaster Management Division (DM Division). When "calamities of severe nature" occur, the Central Government is responsible for providing aid and assistance to the affected state, as may be needed, including the deploying, at the State’s request, of Armed Forces, Central Paramilitary Forces, the National Disaster Response Force (NDRF), and such communication, air and other assets, as are available and needed. The response of the central government is based on "gravity of a natural calamity" and the "scale of the relief operation".

The “apex Body for Disaster Management" in India, mandated by the Disaster Management Act, 2005, is the National Disaster Management Authority (NDMA). The NDRF, under the NDRM consists of 12 battalions, and is organised along the lines of a paramilitary force. The NDRF has several flag rank officers, and its Director General wears the uniform and badges of rank of an army three-star general.

=== Armed forces ===
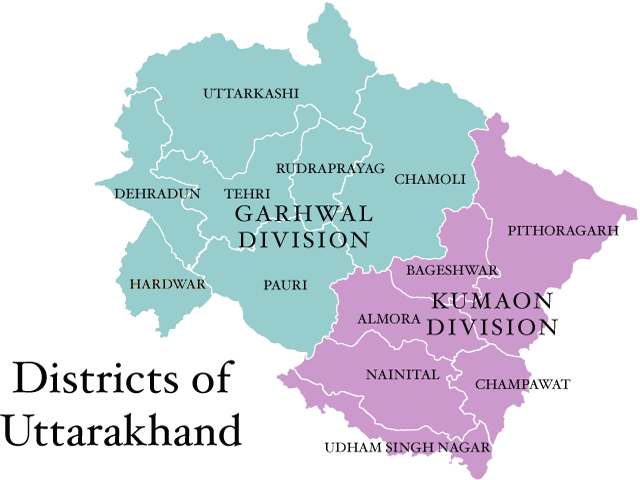
Uttarakhund

On 19 June, the day Operation Ganga Prahar became Operation Surya Hope, and the strength of the Army in the affected area was 5,600. By 27 June 2013, the Army's numbers in the mission area had increased to above 8,500. Army's disaster response units included infantry battalions, Army Service Corps units to provide Logistic and Supply support, signals regiment, engineer regiments, advance dressing stations and other medical units, special forces, specialised mountain troops, paratroopers, and army aviation corps assets. The Army Aviation Corps deployed 13 helicopters (nine on 19 June and an additional four the next day). This is the largest humanitarian mission by the Indian Army in several decades.

By 23 June, the total number of aircraft involved in the evacuation, relief, rescue, and search tasks, according to government sources, was 83 (IAF-45, Army-13, state government hired civil helicopters- 25). The helicopters carried out their mission in hazardous mountain conditions, often in rain and fog, in what one pilot called a "war like situation". On 24 June, Air Chief Marshal Norman Anil Kumar Browne, the Chief of the Indian Air-force, to assure the people cut off in the mountains, by the bad weather, road blocks, and the floods, said "Our helicopter rotors will not stop churning till such time we get each one of you out. Do not lose hope, and hang in there." The next day, 25 June, to high light the hazardous conditions of flying, an IAF Mi 17, Russian built helicopter, flying in poor visibility, in a narrow valley, crashed into the mountain side killing all 20 on board (5 IAF, 6 ITBP, and 9 NDRF personnel). The Indian Navy, too, had a small presence in the mission area. The Navy's marine commandos (Marcos), were deployed to Rudraprayag, and Rishikesh, for rescue and search missions. It is not known what task, if any, was performed by this group.

=== Ministry of Home Affairs (MHA) ===
The National Disaster Response Force (NDRF) deployed 13 teams (a total of 422 persons) from two NDRF battalions in six locations, as follows: five teams (174 personnel) in Rudraprayag District, three teams (89 personnel) in the Haridwar area, one team (33 personnel) in Guptkashi, one team (29 personnel) in Lakshar, one team (40 personnel) in Gaurikund, one team (45 personnel) in Dehradun, and one team (12 personnel) at Jolly Grant Airport. The NDRF mission was to assist the "State Government for search and rescue operations". The strength of Indo-Tibetan Border Police (ITBP) in the affected area as on 20 June 13 was 600 personnel: 300 from the Ist ITBP Battalion in the Joshimath area, and 300 from the 8th ITBP Battalion in Kedarnath, Gaurikund, and Gaucher.

== Conduct ==
For relief and rescue operations, the Army divided the affected areas into four axes, or sub sectors: [1] Rishikesh – Uttarkashi – Harsil – Gangotri axis [2] Rudraprayag – Kedarnath axis [3] Joshimath – Badrinath axis and Dharchhula – Tawaghat axis, and [4] Pithoragarh district, in Kumaon division. The Army's response plan consisted of three broad phases. Phase One, 19–20 June; Phase Two, 21–22 June; and Phase Three, 23 June onwards.

On 19–20 June, the Army conducted reconnaissance and carried out air evacuation of people stranded along Govindghat-Badrinath road, track from Ghagriya to Hemkund to Badrinath and Ghagriya. By evening 19 June, the Army had evacuated 1,610 civilians in Uttarkashi district, 3,034 in Joshimath sector, and 1,550 people from Govindghat. Shelter, food and medical aid had been provided to 1,300 people in the Uttarkashi area and 1,276 in Joshmith, while medical teams had treated 300 people in Joshimath, 150 in Harsil, and 70 in Rudraprag. By evening on 20 June the Army reported that it had "rescued more than 11000 people, mainly from Govindghat and Harsil", and was sheltering, feeding, and providing medical assistance to about 10,000. On 20 June the army opened the road up to Uttarkashi, and to Sonprayag on Kedarnath axis. On the same day it launched a bridge across Vasuki Ganga between Mundkatiya and Sonprayag, and started work on the repair of the bridge over Alaknanda between Govindghat and Ghagria on Hemkund Sahib track. On 20 June, the army, started work on the maintenance and improvement, and expansion of helipad at Gagaria on Hemkund Sahib axis to make it ready to accommodate the larger MI-17 helicopter to allow for speedier aerial evacuation. Following aerial reconnaissance on 19 June, the army on 21 June dropped Paratroopers in Rudraprayag-Kedarnath, Jungle Chatti, and other in accessible areas to establish contact with to stranded pilgrims and commence relief and evacuation operations. Simultaneously, it establishes "heli-bridge-air shuttle service between Jungle Chatti and Gaurikund". On 21–22 June, the army's ground troops moved to Sonprayag and Kedarnath, to build infrastructure to receive, move, assist, treat, and hold the affected people.

On 23 June, phase three of the Army's operation began. The priorities of phase three included relief, rescue, search, and evacuation operations. The army worked on securing, marking, and improving helipads; repairing and installing bridges; improving and restoring tracks; establishing staging areas, transit areas, reception centres, medical aid posts; escorting and guiding people; providing food, water, shelter, and medical aid to the affected population, and most importantly providing through their presence, example, and leadership, hope, and encouragement to the stranded population. A steel foot bridge across Alaknanda at Lambagar in Badrinath Valley, by the army engineers, was under construction, on 26 June 13, to facilitate the cross river evacuation. As of 26 June Surya Hope had delivered 24 tons of food, fuel, medicines, blankets and relief material and evacuated 33,000 people, including 2,715 by thirteen helicopters of the Army Aviation Corps, which clocked over 600 sorties. Special troops trained in high altitude search, rescue, and relief work, including paratroopers and heli-borne troops, were deployed on search and rescue missions in the Kedarnath and Badrinath axis, along Arva Tal on Gangotri – Mana axis, and in the Pindari Glacier, and Sunder Dunga Glacier in Kumaon region, to search, rescue, and assist, stranded civilians.

Medical aid formed an important component of the mission. Doctors from Army Medical Corps (AMC), and nurses from the Military Nursing Service were amongst the lead elements to be deployed in the area. By 19 June it was reported that 12 self-sufficient medical teams were deployed in the area. An emergency medical helpline was opened, and military communication channels were provided to affected people to speak with their families and friends.

By 25 June the strength of ‘self sufficient’ military medical posts, it was reported, had increased to 29. An ‘Accident and Emergency Services Medical Centre’ was established at Joshimath Helipad. These medical posts were manned by Army doctors, nurses, and para-medics. Medical camps were reported ready at Gothi, Dharchula, Gauridham, Tijam, and the Military Hospital at Pithoragarh, was opened for civilian casualties along the Pithoragarh – Dharchula – Tawaghat axis. Thousands of patients were provided medical attention at these facilities daily. In addition, the IAF deployed Air Force Rapid Action Medical Teams, with the air stations, and detachments. On 26 June a team of two psychiatrists from the Army Medical Corps(AMC) opened a post disaster and trauma counselling centre in the Joshimath sector, to provide counselling to the civil population stranded at Badrinath and Kedarnath. The same day teams from the Army Veterinary Corps consisting of a veterinary doctor and two paramedics were inserted by helicopter to establish Animal Aid Posts along the Hemkund axis to take care of ponies and mules stranded in the area. Similar aid posts were planned for Gauri Kund.

In addition to humanitarian operations in the high Himalayas, Central Command carried out rescue, relief, and assistance missions in the flood affected areas on the plains in Uttar Pradesh. Six Army humanitarian columns were deployed on 20 June to cover the Pilibhit, Muzaffarnagar, Laksar and Amroha districts in Uttar Pradesh. Two columns were deployed for missions in Saharanpur and Bijnor districts. In the plains the army assisted with evacuation of flood affected persons, and construction of anti-flood bunds.

== Appraisal ==
The Government of Uttarakhand, and Vijay Bahuguna, the Chief Minister of Uttarakhand, have been blamed for not taking heed of the meteorological departments warning, failing to issue timely evacuation advisory, for being ill-prepared, for tardy and disorganised response, and poor leadership. Some have suggested that it was not a natural disaster but a man made disaster. Chief Minister Bahuguna denied that it was a man made disaster stating that "There was no delay" and that "more than a lakh people were evacuated without any law and order problem, so credit should go to the government", adding "I don't agree that it is a man-made disaster. Calamities are not in our control. I cannot control tsunami, earthquake or cloudburst."

The army's and the IAF's performance and discipline, in the response to the Humanitarian crisis in Uttarakhand, has been widely applauded. The performance of the NDMA and the NDRF, organisations which are well-funded, has been faulted. It was criticised for providing a tardy, sloppy response to the disaster and for failing "miserably in its first major challenge".

There was no clear accounting of the dead, injured and missing, even two weeks after the flash floods struck the state on 17 June. As late as 2 July 2013, official figures for the dead and missing varied between of 800 to over 10,000. Govind Singh Kunjwal, Uttarakhand Assembly Speaker, and the NDMA's vice-chairman, Shashidhar Reddy, on 1 July, estimated that "more than 10,000" were killed by the floods. The Home Ministry estimate of the death toll was lower at 800. Vijay Bahuguna, the Chief Minister of Uttarakhand, thought that the death toll "will exceed 1000". Controversially on 1 July, he said, "We will never know the exact number of the dead and the number of people buried or washed away." Even for the missing there were varied estimates. The Uttarakhand Police estimated the missing to be no more than 500. NDMA, UN agencies, and NGOs, estimates on 2 July for 'missing' was upward of 10,000. A week later on 8 July Vijay Bahuguna, the Chief Minister, said over 4000 were missing, of whom 795 were from Uttarakhand, his home state.

On 15 July, the official toll for the disaster was 580 confirmed dead, and 5,748 missing (924, from Uttarakhand and 4,824 are from other Indian states). The Chief Minister Vijay Bahuguna confirmed that Uttarakhand was not issuing death certificates, “We are only giving some monetary help to the family.” "The total fatalities for the purposes of compensation thus is 6328. The state authorities have decided to treat the ‘missing’ as presumed dead for the purposes of compensation, even though the usual time lag between being ‘missing’ and being declared dead is seven years. The next of kin of the dead and the ‘missing’ will be paid Rupees 500,000 ($8,394). Residents of Uttarakhand will be paid by the state government. Those from other states will be paid 350, 000 by the central government, and 150,000, by the state government."

== Timeline ==
13 June 2013: Meteorological Department (IMD), Dehradun, forecast "heavy to very heavy rainfall in the upper regions of Uttarakhand in the next 48 to 72 hours". The Central Government, Uttarakhund Government, and the National Disaster Management Authority, ignore the warning.

14–16 June 2013: Heavy unseasonal monsoon rain in north India, trigger floods, and landslides, in the north western mountain states of Uttar Pradesh, Uttarakhand, and Himachal Pradesh.

17 June 2013: Army aviation helicopters conduct aerial reconnaissance of Himalayan temple town Kedarnath. Army orders an infantry unit to send a foot column to establish contact with the beleaguered temple town. Next day, early morning, after a night march, an infantry column reaches Kedarnath. The Bareilly based Uttar Bharat Area mobilises headquarters to move to Dehradun, the state capital. India Army's Central Command starts deployment of 5000 troops in the flood affected areas, in response named "Operation Ganga Prahar". Indian Air Force (IAF) helicopters conducts relief and rescue missions in Nakur area, Saharanpur district, in Uttar Pradesh and Indri Sub division of Karnal district, in Haryana state. IAF station Sarsawa designated as hub for helicopter operations. Medium lift helicopters including MI -17 V5s, moved to Jollygrant helipad, Dehradun. Late in the evening, Defense Minister A.K. Antony, alerts the Armed Forces for relief and rescue mission. Chief Minister of Uttarakhand, returns from Delhi.

18 June 2013: Lt-General Navtej Singh Bawa, the general officer commanding (GOC) Uttar Bharat Area, moves to Dehradun, to lead the Army disaster response and co-ordinate with the State government, and other agencies. Indian Air Force's humanitarian mission, named Operation Rahat. Ministry of Home Affairs (MHA), outlines response to the unfolding disaster. On 15 June, the Inspector General, Indo-Tibetan Border Police (ITBP), Uttarakhand, ordered to "get in touch with Chief Secretary and provide whatever assistance was required by the State Government"; Border Road Organisation (BRO) asked to "facilitate restoration of road communication across the different routes"; 12 additional teams of the National Disaster Relief Force (NDRF) ordered to be deployed to Uttarakhand, and 34 deaths confirmed in Uttarakhund. Rudraprayag, for the next four days was without a district magistrate and no system was in place to get information on who died, where the injured had been admitted and who were still trapped. No deputy collector was posted in Gaurikund, Sonprayag, Phata and Guptkashi for five days

19 June 2013: Prime Minister Manmohan Singh, who is also Chairman of the National Disaster Management Authority (NDMA) and the Indian Congress Party President Sonia Gandhi, carry out an aerial survey of affected area. The PM calls the situation in Uttarrakhand a 'disaster' and directs "all Central Agencies to render all possible assistance in their domain to the State.” Responders in affected area include Army-5500, Border Roads Organisation-3000, ITBP -600, National Disaster Response Force 13 teams-422, helicopters (IAF, army and civil) 18 and C-130-1.

20 June 2013: Disaster toll : Districts affected: 09; Deaths: 71; Injured: 53; Missing: 23; Livestock lost: 1157; Houses 'fully' damaged: 366; Houses partially damaged: 272; Bridges damaged: 21; Stranded pilgrims: 62,122; Persons rescued: 22,392 (1295 in Kedarnath, 8878 in Chamoli, 7219 in Uttrakashi, 2000 in Tehiri,3000 in Pithoragarh).

21 June 2013: V.K. Duggal, retired bureaucrat, and one of the eight members of the NDMA, holding the post of Minister of State designated nodal officer to co-ordinate rescue, relief, and assistance mission. Uttarakhand Government posts 12 officers to disaster affected areas as nodal officers to co-ordinate the response. The officers reach their respective posts on 22 and 23 June.

25 June 2013: An IAF Mi-17 V5 helicopter on a relief and rescue mission from Gauchar to Guptkashi and Kedarnath on return leg from Kedarnath crashed North of Gaurikund. 20 persons on board were killed. Of these five were IAF crew members, and 15 ITBP soldiers, of whom 9 were on deputation with NDRF.

26 June 2013: Central Command launches a website for reporting "minute to minute" progress on Operation Surya Hope in Uttarakhand. The site provides location wise list of stranded and rescued persons, and press releases(10) issued by Central Command. Government imports 25 satellite phones from Hong Kong for the ill-prepared NDMA and NDRF.

28 June 13: General Bikram Singh, the Chief of the Army Staff, on a visit to Gaucher, in Uttarakhand, while speaking to a journalist, says that the purpose of Operation Surya Hope was to provide “aid to civil authorities”, to “strengthen the hands of the civil administration”. The Army confirms that all people stranded in Kedarnath had been evacuated, and that the road to Badrinath was open.

30 June 2013: A Ministry of Defence update notes that the IAF from 17 to 30 June 2013, had airlifted 18,424 persons, in 2,137 sorties, and delivered 3,36,930 kg of relief supplies.

2 July 2013: The evacuation of all stranded pilgrims is completed. BBC described it as "one of the world's largest air rescue operations".

10 July 2013: Army Engineers start work on a new 20 km route to restore land communication with Kedarnath, which has remained cut off since 16 June. An advance team of four officers and 21 soldiers reach Gomkara on 11 July. The alignment of the new route, which in places is over 13,000 feet, is Sonprayag-Gomkar-Dev Vishnu-Dhungaj Giri-Kedarnath.

15 July 2013: Officials confirmed that the disaster toll was 580 dead, and 5,748 missing (924 from Uttarakhand and 4,824 from other Indian states), and that a total of 108,653 people have been evacuated from affected area by air and foot.

16 September 2013 Subhash Kumar, Chief Secretary of Uttarakhand, issued revised figures for missing persons from 5,100 to 4,120, including 421 children. The revised figures, compiled by the Dehradun-based Missing Persons Cell, are based on a review of the First Information Reports (FIRs) recorded in the state's 13 districts. The state wise distribution of missing persons is: 852 from Uttarakhand (including 652 from Rudrapryag district alone), 1,150 from Uttar Pradesh, 542 from Madhya Pradesh, 511 from Rajasthan, 216 from Delhi, 163 from Maharashtra, 129 from Gujarat, 112 from Haryana, 86 from Andhra Pradesh, 58 from Bihar, 40 from Jharkhand, 36 from West Bengal, 33 from Punjab, 29 from Chhattisgarh, 26 from Odisha, 14 each from Tamil Nadu and Karnataka, six from Meghalaya, four from Chandigarh, three from Jammu and Kashmir, two from Kerala and one each from Puducherry and Assam.
