= Shyam Bihari Prasad Sinha =

Air Marshal Shyam Bihari Prasad Sinha PVSM, AVSM, VM, ADC
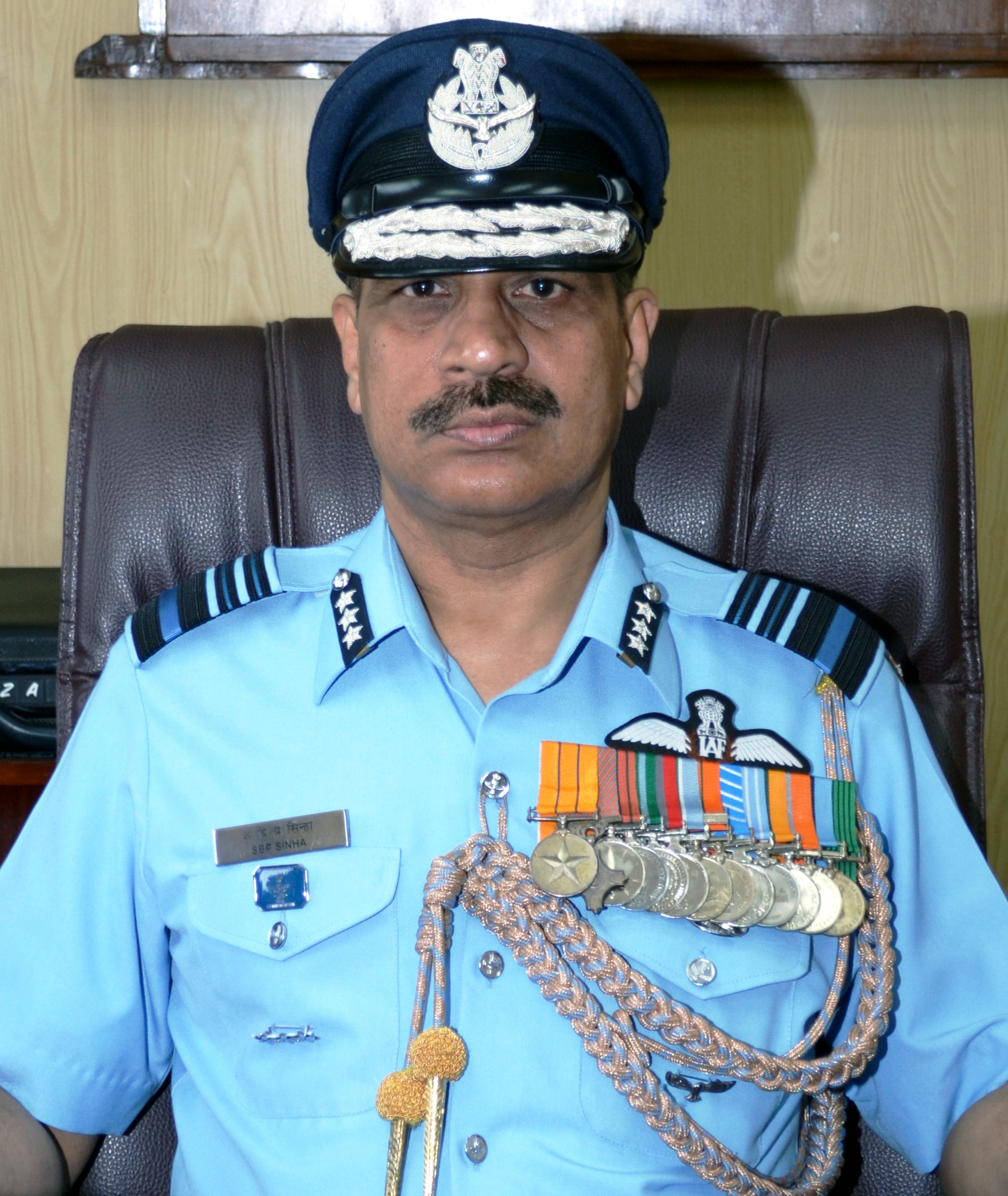
- Allegiance: India
- Branch: Indian Air Force
- Service years: 15 June 1980 – 31 December 2018
- Rank: Air Marshal
- Service number: 16053
- Commands: Central Air Command; Deputy Chief of the Air Staff
- Awards: Param Vishisht Seva Medal; Ati Vishisht Seva Medal; Vayu Sena Medal ADC
- Spouse: Alpana Sinha

Air Marshal Shyam Bihari Prasad Sinha, PVSM, AVSM, VM, ADC is a retired officer of Indian Air Force who served as Air Officer Commanding-in-Chief (AOC-in-C), Central Air Command from 1 January 2016 to 31 December 2018. He assumed office from Air Marshal Kulwant Singh Gill and was succeeded by Air Marshal Rajesh Kumar. AVSM, VM.

== Early life and education ==
Sinha is an alumnus of National Defence Academy, Pune and Defence Services Staff College, Wellington. He has also taken the Operational Electronic Warfare course in France and the Executive course on Security Studies in United States.

== Career ==
Sinha was commissioned into the fighter stream of the Indian Air Force on 15 June 1980. He has clocked over 3700 hours of flying and has experience on many different types of fighters. He held several key operational and administrative appointments at various stages of his service including the Commanding Officer of a MiG-21 Squadron; Commandant of Electronic Warfare Range; Team Leader of AWACS Project Team in Israel; Air Officer Commanding of a front line Su-30 MKI Base; Assistant Chief of the Air Staff (Plans); Principal Director Plans, Principal Director C4ISR; Principal Director Acquisitions; Deputy Director of Operations (Electronic Warfare); Chief Flying Instructor of Basic Flying Training School; Air Force Examiner in Aircrew Examining Board and the Deputy Chief of the Air Staff (30 April 2014 – 31 December 2015). He is a Category A Flying Instructor, Instrument Rating Instructor and Examiner. He was also the Commodore Commandant of No. 7 Squadron.

== Awards and medals ==
During 38 years of his career, he has been awarded several medals: two Presidential medals, the Ati Vishisht Seva Medal (January 2011), the Vayu Sena Medal. and the Param Vishisht Seva Medal (January 2018).

	Param Vishisht Seva Medal	Ati Vishisht Seva Medal	
Vayu Sena Medal	General Service Medal - Naga Hills Service	Samanya Seva Medal	Special Service Medal
Operation Parakram Medal	Sainya Seva Medal	High Altitude Service Medal	Videsh Seva Medal
50th Anniversary of Independence Medal	30 Years Long Service Medal	20 Years Long Service Medal	9 Years Long Service Medal

== Personal life ==
He is married to Alpana Sinha and they have a son. His brother B B P Sinha was also an Air Marshal in the Indian Air Force.

Military offices
Preceded by Kulwant Singh Gill	Air Officer Commanding-in-Chief, Central Air Command; 1 January 2016 – 31 December 2018	Succeeded by Rajesh Kumar
Preceded by Sridharan Panicker Radha Krishnan Nair	Deputy Chief of the Air Staff; 30 April 2014 – 31 December 2015	Succeeded by Rakesh Kumar Singh Bhadauria
