= Kulwant Singh Gill =

Air Marshal Kulwant Singh Gill PVSM, AVSM, YSM, VM(G)
- Military career
- Allegiance: India
- Branch: Indian Air Force
- Service years: Dec 1977 to 31 December 2015
- Rank: Air Marshal
- Commands: Central Air Command
- Awards: Param Vishisht Seva Medal; Ati Vishisht Seva Medal; Yudh Seva Medal; Vayu Sena Medal (Gallantry)

Air Marshal Kulwant Singh Gill, PVSM, AVSM, YSM, VM(G) was former Air Officer Commanding-in-Chief (AOC-in-C) of Central Air Command of Indian Air Force. Commissioned into the Flying Branch of the Indian Air Force in Dec 1977. In a career spanning three decades and six years, he has held instructional, directional and command appointments, including Commandant of the National Defence Academy.

== Career ==
Air Marshal Kulwant Singh Gill was commissioned into the Flying Branch of the Indian Air Force in Dec 1977. In a career spanning three decades and six years, he has held instructional, directional and command appointments, including Commandant of the National Defence Academy. In 2014 he was appointed AOC-in-C of Central Air Command.

Before assuming the office of AOC-in-C of Central Air Command, Singh was the commandant of the National Defence Academy. He retired from service on 31 December 2015 after three decades of service. Air Marshal SBP Sinha, AVSM, VM succeeded him as the AOC-in-C.

== Family ==
Air Marshal KS Gill is married to Ranjeet Gil, a homemaker. The couple have three children. The second child and their only son Shahbeg Singh Gill is a fighter pilot and was commissioned in the IAF into the Flying Branch.

== Military awards and aecorations ==

Param Vishisht Seva Medal	Ati Vishisht Seva Medal		Yudh Seva Medal
Vayu Sena Medal	Samanya Seva Medal	Special Service Medal	Operation Vijay Medal
Sainya Seva Medal	High Altitude Service Medal	Videsh Seva Medal	50th Anniversary of Independence Medal
30 Years Long Service Medal	20 Years Long Service Medal	9 Years Long Service Medal	UN Mission in Congo Ribbon

Military offices
Preceded by Jasvinder Chauhan	Air Officer Commanding-in-Chief, Central Air Command; 1 August 2014 - 31 December 2015	Succeeded by Shyam Bihari Prasad Sinha
