= Operation Mand =

1986 military operation by India

- Part of Insurgency in Punjab, India
Date	21–22 July 1986
Location	Mand, Punjab, India
Result	Tat Khalsa victory

Belligerents
Tat Khalsa	India: Central Reserve Police Force; Border Security Force; Punjab Police

Commanders and leaders
Avtar Singh Brahma	PM Rajiv Gandhi; HM Buta Singh; CM Surjit Barnala; DGP KPS Gill; IPS Julio Riberio

Casualties and losses
Unknown	1 helicopter destroyed

Operation Mand was a military operation launched by the Punjab Police in India to capture or kill Avtar Singh Brahma and Tat Khalsa members on 21 and 22 July 1986.

== Background ==
Avtar Singh Brahma was a Sikh kharku who had founded the group Tat Khalsa. He quickly grew to prominence by launching constant attacks on CRPF, BSF, Police, and Army patrols. Brahma centered his group and operation in the Mand region which is the riverbank land along the Beas. Brahma would be dubbed the "King of Mand" and became the de facto ruler of the region, which covers an area of 240 square kilometres (93 sq mi).

== Operation ==
On 21 July 1986, Operation Mand would be launched. The Operation was led and planned by KPS Gill and was approved by Julio Riberio. About 30 companies of security forces assisted by helicopters, bulldozers and mechanized boats, were deployed for the operation. Brahma operated 5 groups of 25–30 operatives.

The operation did not go as expected for the Indian forces. Thousands of police and paramilitary forces surrounded the Mand region and closed in on the Tat Khalsa men. According to Avtar Singh, he and his fellow Tat Khalsa members clashed with and repulsed an attacking force of officers and paramilitary, with the attacking force suffering high casualties. Avtar Singh also claims to have shot down a paramilitary helicopter. Both helicopters are reported to have retreated after this. The battle continued for some time, but eventually, the security forces fell back for the night. Avtar Singh Brahma and fellow Tat Khalsa members managed to escape at night. The operation lasted for 40 hours.

== Aftermath ==
The operation faced criticism for being "overkill". It was initially described as the destruction of the Khalistan capital, but police had only captured a few weapons. The operation also saw criticism from Revenue Minister Major Singh Uboke, a dissident in the ruling party. He called Operation Mand "Operation Fraud". He accused, at a cabinet meeting, the security forces of harassing and torturing "innocent Sikh youths and even women". Ribeiro would counter criticism saying the operation was successful in its goal of ridding the militants of their base of operation.

== Pop culture ==
The operation is depicted in the 2017 Indian film Toofan Singh.
