= Operation Rahat =

Operation Rahat (Hindi: राहत Rāhat, lit. "Relief") was the name given to the Indian Air Force's rescue operations to evacuate civilians affected by the 2013 North India floods. Thousands of pilgrims in transit in the hill states of Uttarakhand and Himachal Pradesh were stranded in various valleys. It was one of the largest operations of the Indian Armed Forces in several decades. and IAF claims it to be the biggest civilian rescue operation in the world carried out by any air force using helicopters. During the first phase of the operation From 17 June 2013, the IAF airlifted a total of 19,600 people - flying a total of 2,140 sorties and dropping/landing a total of 3,82,400 kg of relief material and equipment. Air Vice Marshal (then) SRK Nair was the IAF coordinator on ground at Uttarakhand.

On 16 June, following flash floods due to heavy rains, assistance was sought from the IAF for rescue operations. The Western Air Command (WAC) responded to the requests and undertook simultaneous tasks in the sectors of Yamunanagar, Kedarnath-Badrinath axis, Rudraprayag valley and the Karcham- Puh axis. Air Commodore Rajesh Isser was appointed Task Force Commander of Operation Rahat.

The Sarsawa Air Force Station was made the hub centre with helicopters converging from the Bhatinda and Hindon air force bases. A number of helicopters including the newly inducted Mil Mi-17 V5 were positioned on 17 June at Jolly Grant Airport at Dehradun despite inclement weather. On 17 June, a total of 36 persons were evacuated from Karnal by a Mi-17.

By 19 June, the IAF had deployed 20 aircraft including 8 Mi-17 helicopters, 10 Advanced Light Helicopters (ALH), One An-32 transport aircraft and one HS-748 Transport aircraft to carry out constant missions. IAF operations covered Phata, Guptakashi, Gaurikund, Kedarnath in Dehradun and Rampur, Karcham, Reckong Peo, Sangla in Himachal. The ALH were positioned at Pithoragarh sector for the rescue and food packet drop effort. Four ALH helicopters of the Sarang display team were also deployed for relief operations.

The second phase of the operation entailing support of long-term rehabilitation efforts in the hilly areas of Uttarakhand started on 5 July 2013.

== Aircraft used ==
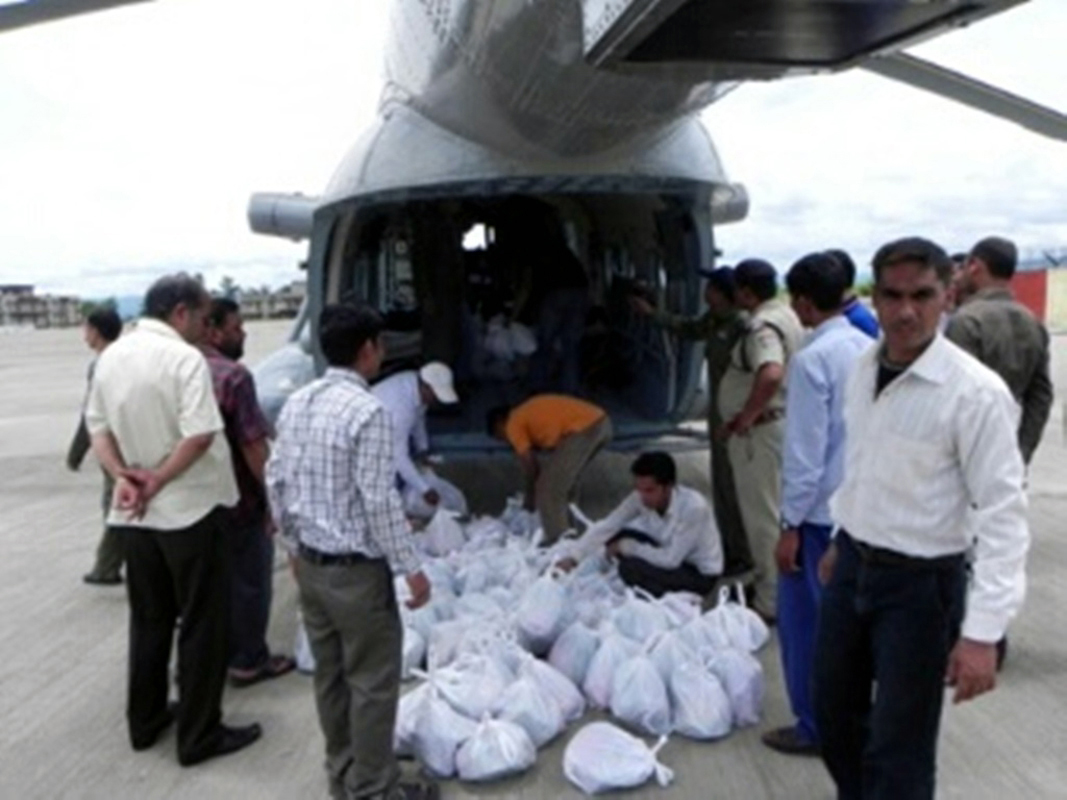
Loading a helicopter

43 aircraft's were used in the operation Rahat:

- 23 - Mi 17 medium twin-turbine transport helicopters.
- 11 - HAL Dhruv, indigenous light utility helicopters
- 1 - Cheetah single-engined Helicopter
- 1 - Mil Mi-26 heavy transport helicopter
- 2 - C130J military transport aircraft
- 3 - AN 32s transport aircraft
- 1 - HS-748 transport aircraft
- 1 - IL-76 heavy transport aircraft

The IAF activated its advanced landing grounds in Gauchar and Dharasu in Uttarakhand to establish an air bridge for chopper movement.

== Helicopter crash ==
On 25 June, a Mi-17 V5 helicopter crashed North of Gaurikund. All 20 persons on board, including 5 Air Force Officers, 9 NDRF personnel and 6 ITBP personnel, were killed. The deceased soldiers were given a ceremonial Guard of honour by Home minister Sushilkumar Shinde at a function organised by the Uttarakhand State Government. Air Chief Marshal N A K Browne, Chief of the Air Staff said "We owe it to the lives our people whom we have lost, that we sustain the mission and complete it successfully". The IAF continued to operate from Dharasu and Pithoragarh detachments flying six Mi-17 V5s, two ALH and one Mi17 from Harsil - Maneri - Dharasu and Darchula - Milam & Kali - Ramganga river axes.

== See also ==
Operation Surya Hope
