= Kabirpur, Kapurthala, Punjab =

Kabirpur is a village near Sultanpur Lodhi in Kapurthala district of Punjab, India. As of 2011, it has a population of just over 800 inhabitants.
