= Gurdwara Hemkund Sahib =

Sikh temple in Uttarakhand, India

Gurudwara Hemkund Sahib
- Gurudwara
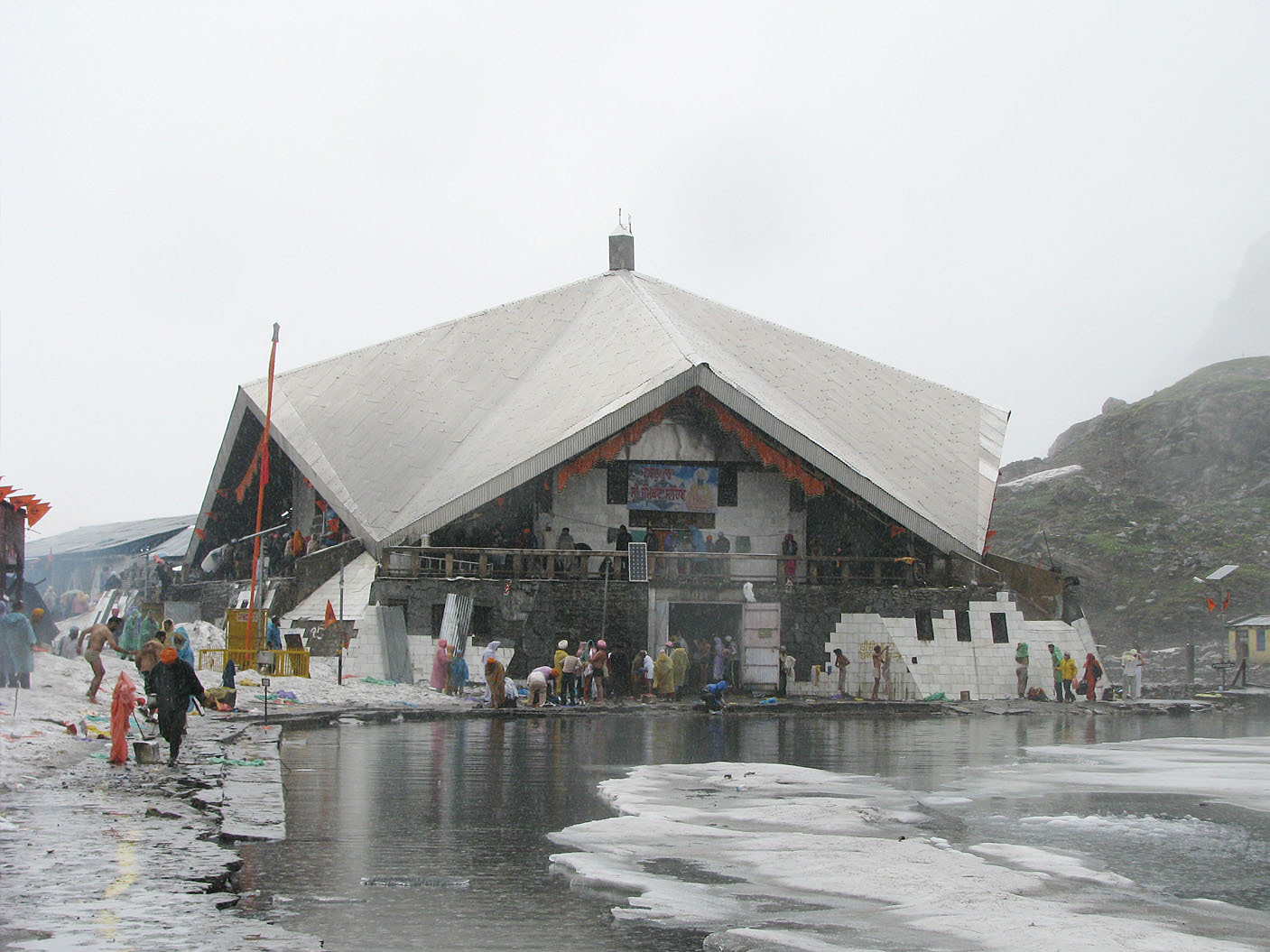
- Gurudwara Shri Hemkund Sahib

- Location in Uttarakhand, India Gurudwara Hemkund Sahib (India)
- Coordinates: 30°42′0.78″N 79°36′57.54″E
- Country: India
- State: Uttarakhand
- District: Chamoli district
- Elevation: 4,572 m (15,000 ft)

Languages
  - Official: Hindi
  - Regional: Garhwali
- Time zone: UTC+5:30 (IST)
- PIN: 249401
- Vehicle registration: UK 11
- Website: shrihemkuntsahib.com

Gurdwara Hemkund Sahib is a Sikh place of worship (gurdwara) and pilgrimage site in Chamoli district, Uttarakhand, India. It is devoted to Guru Gobind Singh (1666–1708), the tenth Sikh Guru, and finds mention in Dasam Granth. With its setting of a glacial lake surrounded by seven mountain peaks, each adorned by a Nishan Sahib on its cliff, it is according to the Survey of India located in the Garhwal Himalaya at an elevation of 4,572 metres (15,000 feet). It is approached from Govindghat on the Rishikesh-Badrinath highway. The main town near Gobindghat is Joshimath. The elevation of the lake at Hemkund is approximately 15,000 feet.

== Etymology ==
Hemkund is a Sanskrit name derived from Hem ("Snow") and Kund ("bowl"). The Dasam Granth says that in a former life, Guru Gobind Singh meditated intensely at Hemkund on Akaal.

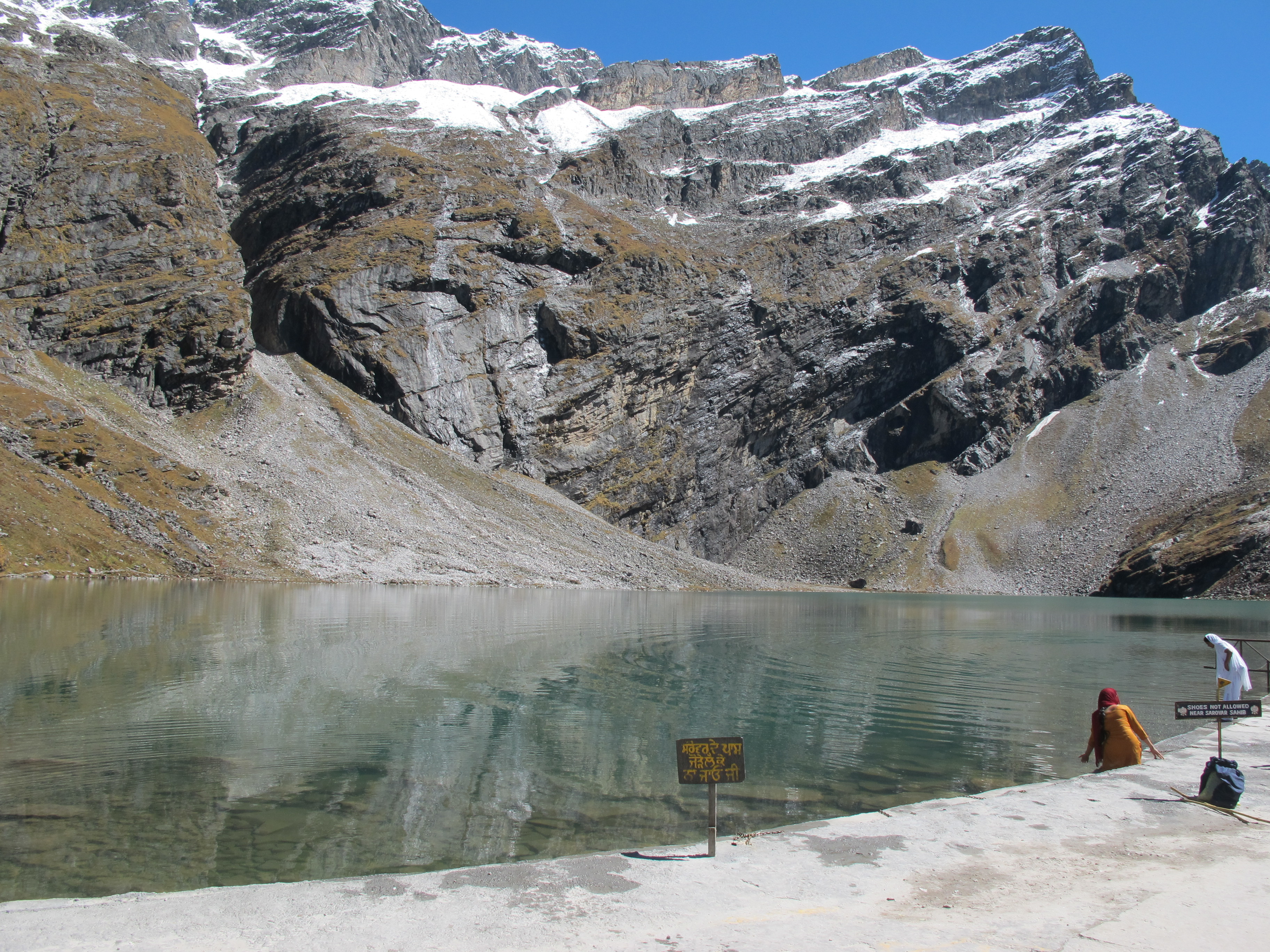
Hemkund Lake, September

== Travel ==
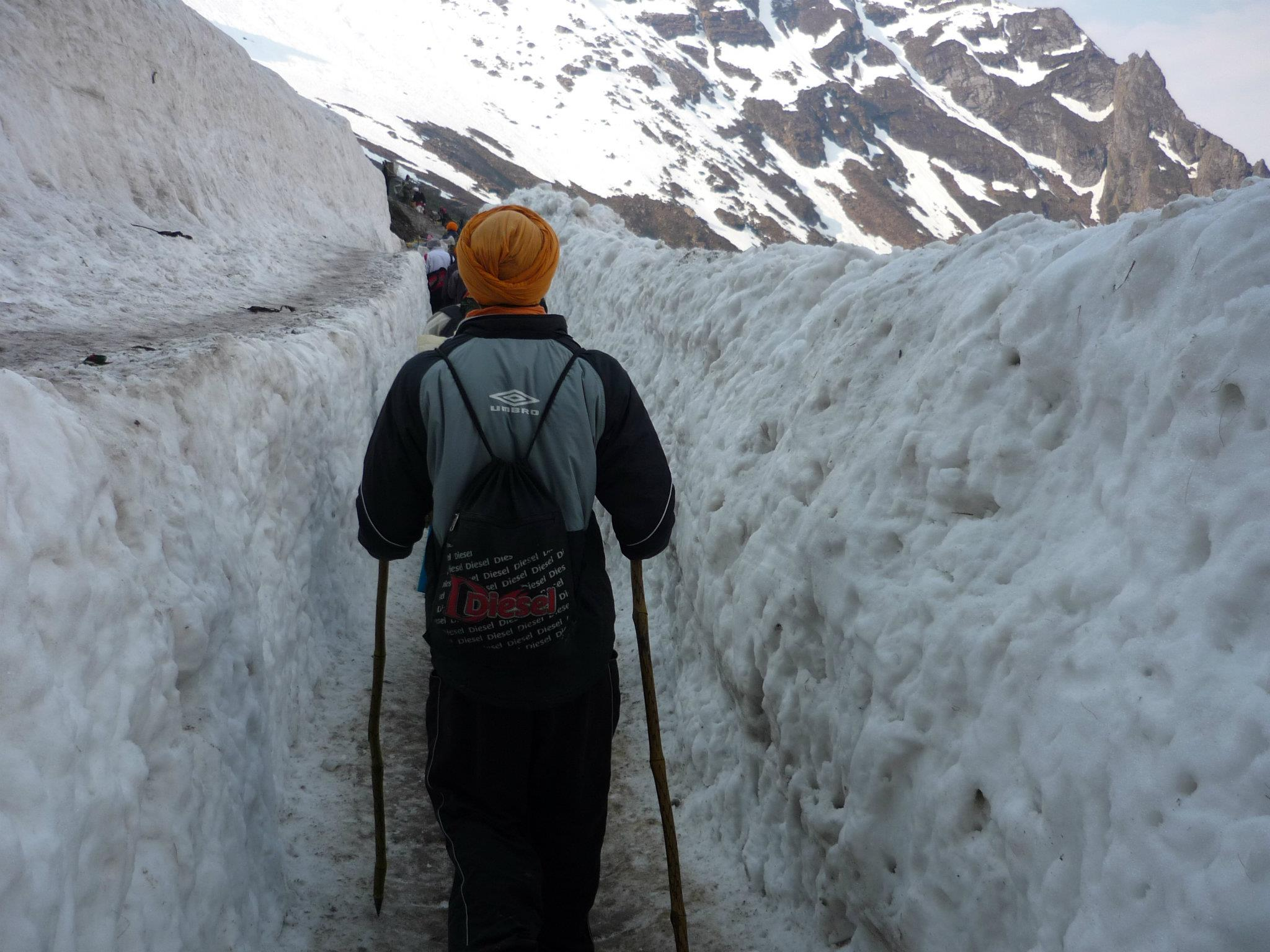
Pilgrims going across the Hemkund Glacier to visit Gurudwara Sri Hemkund Sahib

Hemkund is inaccessible from October through April because of snowbound paths and glaciers. Sikh pilgrims arrive in May and set to work to repair the damage to the path over the winter, which tradition is called kar seva ("selfless service"), a concept which forms an important tenet of the Sikh faith.

The take-off point for Hemkund Sahib is the town of Govindghat, about 275 kilometres (171 mi) from Rishikesh. The 13 kilometres (8.1 mi) trek is along a reasonably well-maintained path to the village of Ghangaria (also called Govinddham). From This 13km trek, 4km can be covered with shared taxi and rest 9km is trek. This path can be covered either by walk or by pony and a Gurudwara here gives shelter to pilgrims. In addition, there are a few hotels and a campground with tents and mattresses. A 1,100-metre (3,600 ft)climb on a 6-kilometre (3.7 mi) of stone paved path leads to Hemkund. Overnight stay is not allowed at Hemkund Sahib, so it is necessary to leave by 2 pm to return to Govindghat by dusk.

From Delhi, tourists take the train to Haridwar and then travel by bus to Govindghat via Rishikesh. It is also possible to drive from Delhi to Govindghat, a distance of about 500 kilometres (310 mi) which takes around 18 hours to cover. Recently, an Indian airline company has started a helicopter service between Govindghat and Ghangria. The flight takes about 5 minutes.

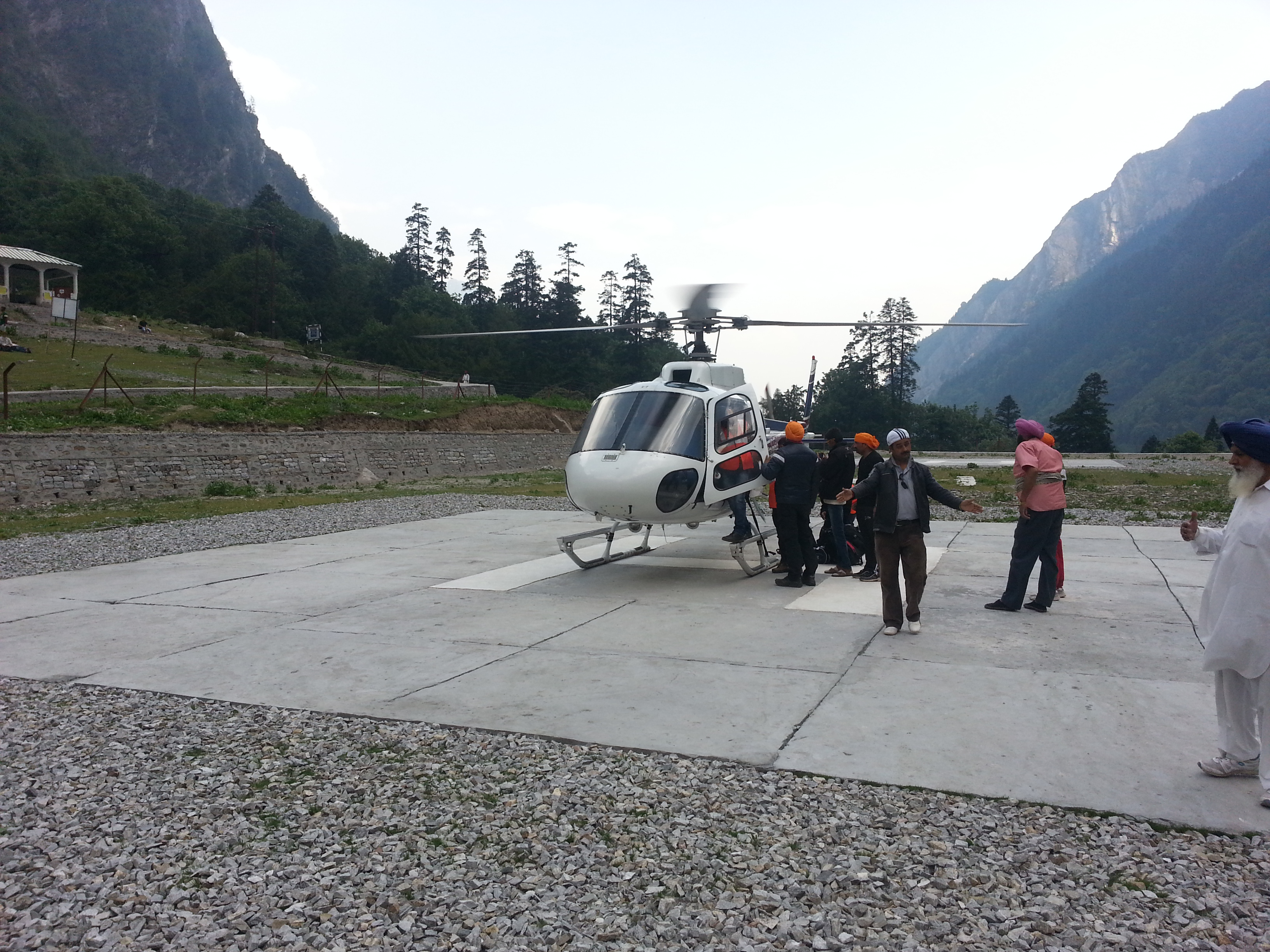
The recent helicopter service started between Govindghat and Gangaria

A recent study examining altitude sickness at Hemkund Sahib found that almost one-third of pilgrims who travelled to Hemkund suffered from Acute Mountain Sickness (a form of altitude sickness). Approximately 150,000 pilgrims are believed to travel to Hemkund Sahib each trekking season, and almost 50,000 people are at risk of developing Acute Mountain Sickness each year. The authors stated the difficult nature of the trek, limited water consumption, and lack of awareness regarding altitude sickness as the main contributory factors.

== Present Gurudwara ==
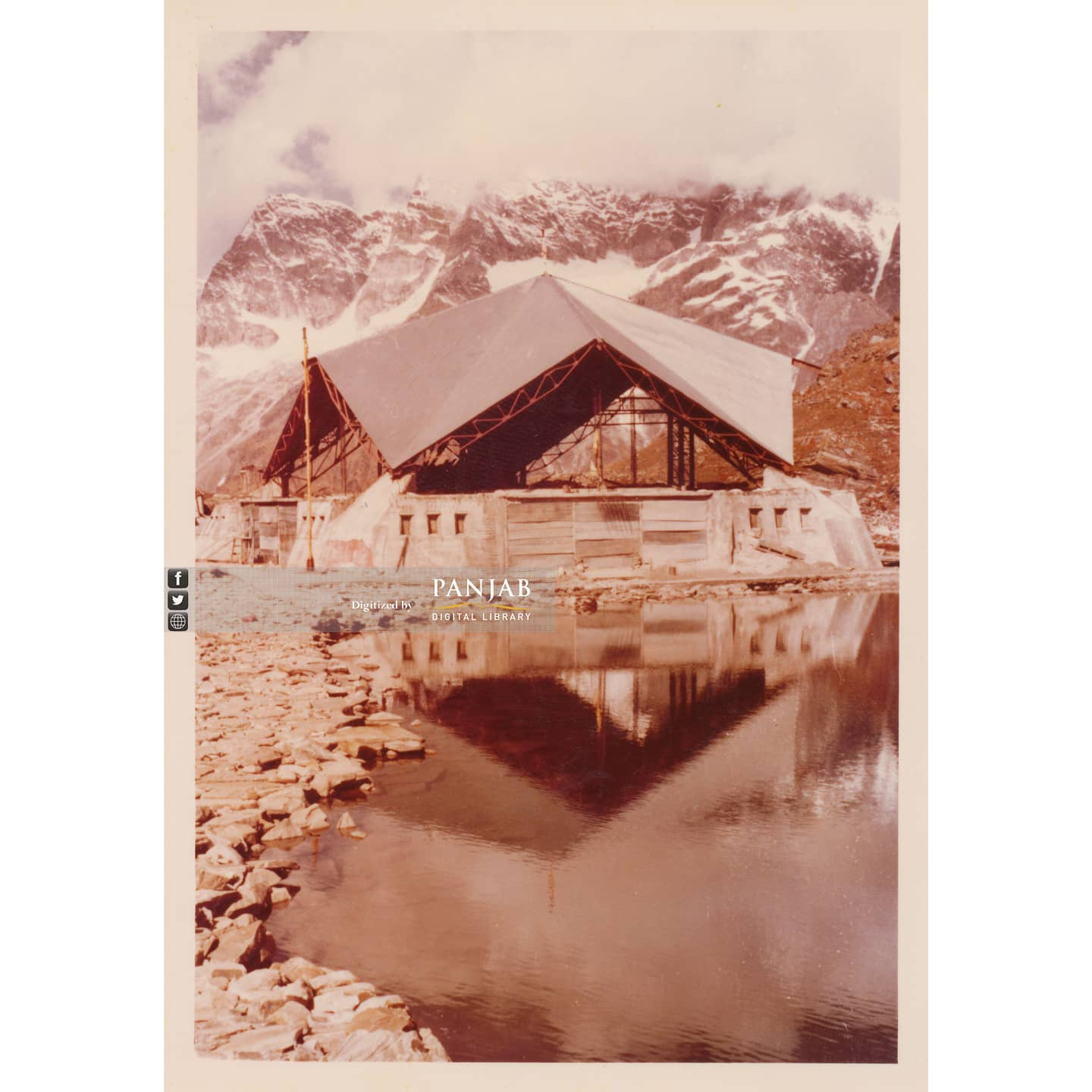
During the construction of Gurudwara Shri Hemkund Sahib. Digitised by Panjab Digital Library.

Design and construction of the present gurudwara at Hemkund was started in the mid-1960s, after Major General Harkirat Singh, KCIO, Engineer-in-Chief, Indian Army visited the gurudwara. The engineering brain behind the Gurudwara project, Major General Harkirat Singh selected Architect Manmohan Singh Siali of the Military Engineering Services (MES) to head the design and construction effort. Thereafter, Architect Siali made annual trips to Hemkund Sahib and organised and supervised complex construction. M/s Sahib Singh, Harbhajan Singh & Gursharan Singh were the dedicated Gursikh contractors who worked on the construction, overcoming numerous weather, altitude, terrain, and logistic challenges. The unique design and construction are acclaimed as marvels, both of which have borne the test of sustainability over the past many decades.

== Lakshman Lokpal Mandir ==
The Lokpal Lakshman Temple, situated on the banks of Hemkund Lake (Lokpal Lake) in Chamoli district, Uttarakhand, is an ancient Hindu shrine associated with local traditions and the mythology of the Ramayana. The lake was traditionally known among the people of the Bhyundar Valley as Lokpal Jheel, long before Hemkund became a major Sikh pilgrimage centre.

It is believed that Lord Lakshman, the brother of Lord Rama, performed penance here in his previous birth in the form of Sheshnag. The Lakshman Temple is situated on the banks of Hemkund Lake, and the villagers of Bhyondar visit the temple to offer prayers and worship.

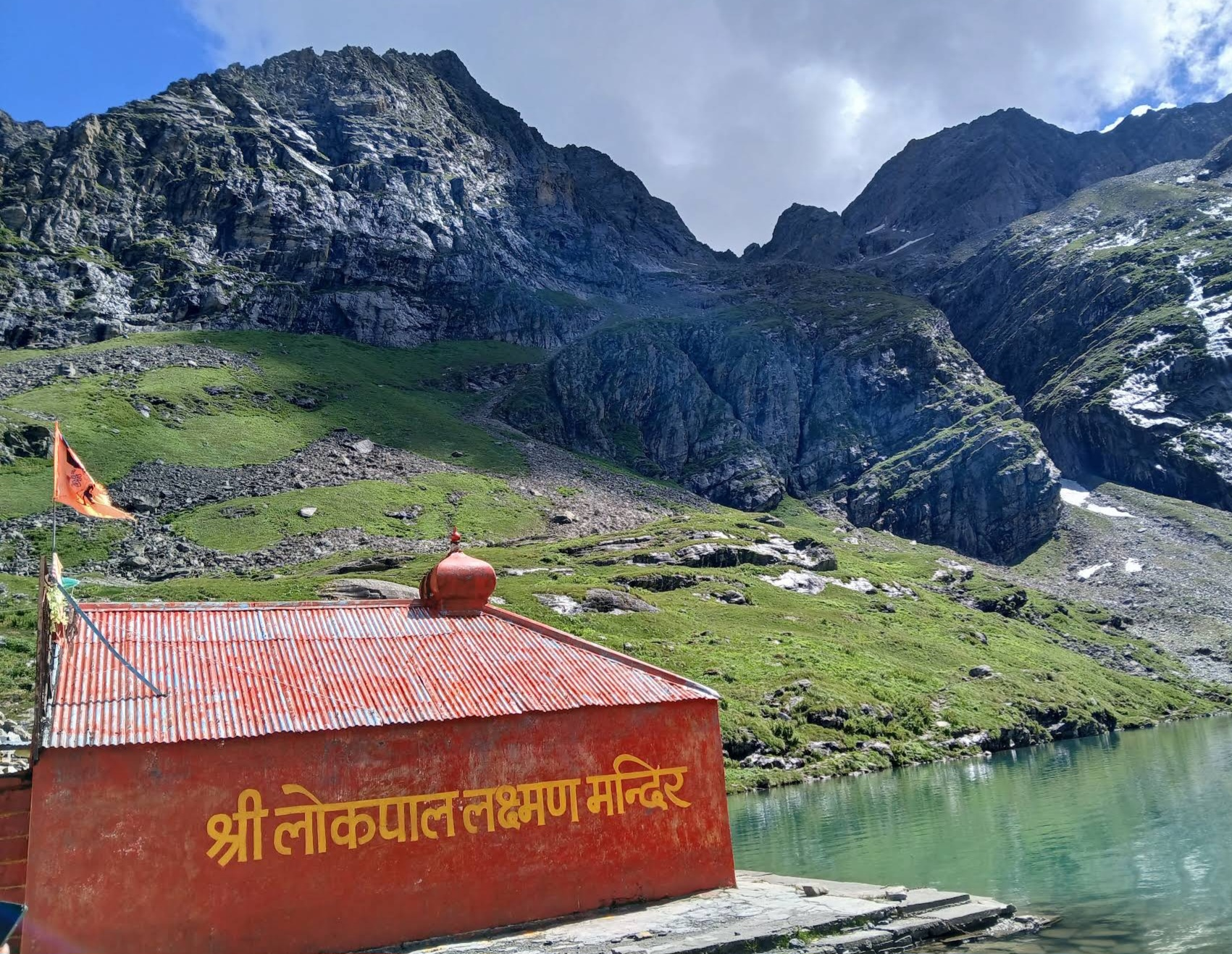
Shri Lokpal Lakshman Mandir along with Lokpal Jheel.

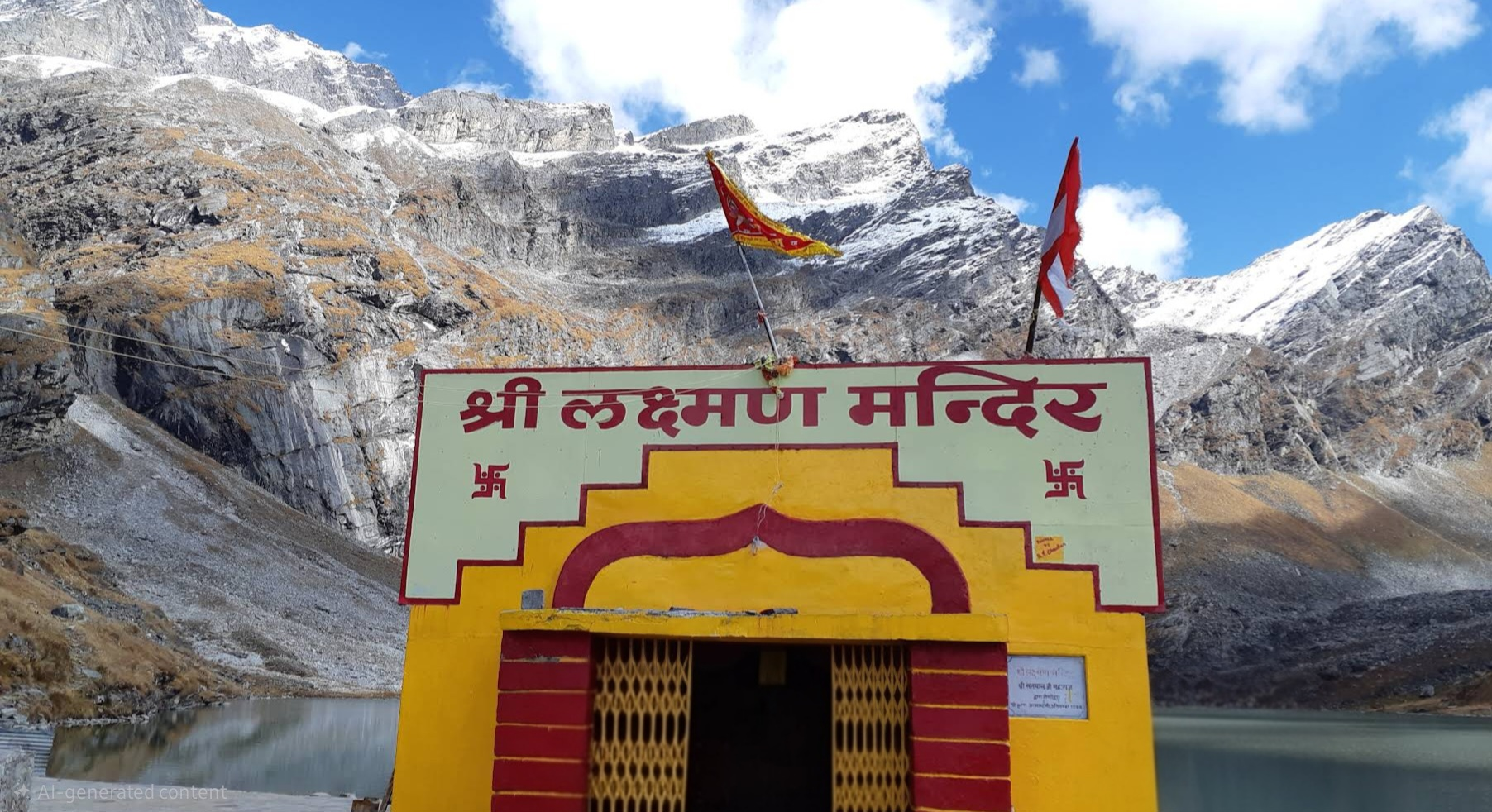
Shri Lakshman Mandir, Near Lokpal Jheel/Hemkunt Jheel

According to Hindu mythology, the Lakshman Temple was built on the banks of Hemkund Lake. Another belief holds that the temple stands at the very spot where Lakshman performed penance to regain his strength after defeating Meghnad, the son of Ravana.

In the 20th century, the area gained wider recognition when Sikh scholars and pilgrims identified Lokpal Lake with the place described in the writings associated with Guru Gobind Singh. Sant Sohan Singh visited the site in the 1930s, and the development of Gurdwara Hemkund Sahib subsequently began near the existing Lakshman shrine. Thus, the present pilgrimage landscape contains both the Lakshman temple and Hemkund Sahib.

== Valley of Flowers ==
About 3 kilometres (1.9 mi) from Gobinddham is the 5-kilometre (3.1 mi) long Valley of Flowers. The Indian Government has declared this valley a national park. It is situated in Nanda Devi Bio Reserve, and all activities are carefully regulated to preserve the valley in pristine condition. The best months to visit are July and August, during the monsoons. Legend has it that a flower called Brahma-Kamal blossoms here every 12 years. The trek to the valley is for advanced trekkers, especially during an extended period of rainfall. Almost every single rock on the path to the valley of Flowers is wobbly and requires a significant level of concentration to avoid an unnecessary injury. It is a popular second destination for pilgrims visiting Hemkunt Sahib and worth spending a day.

== Gallery ==
Views of Hemkund Sahib & Shri Lakshman Temple

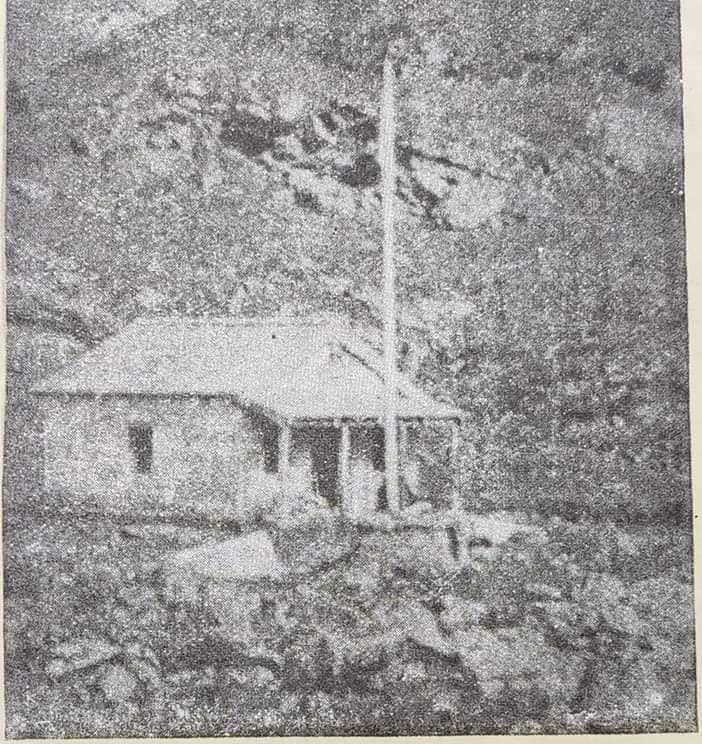
Photograph of Gurdwara Hemkunt Sahib in 1936, the year the first Gurdwara was established (pictured)

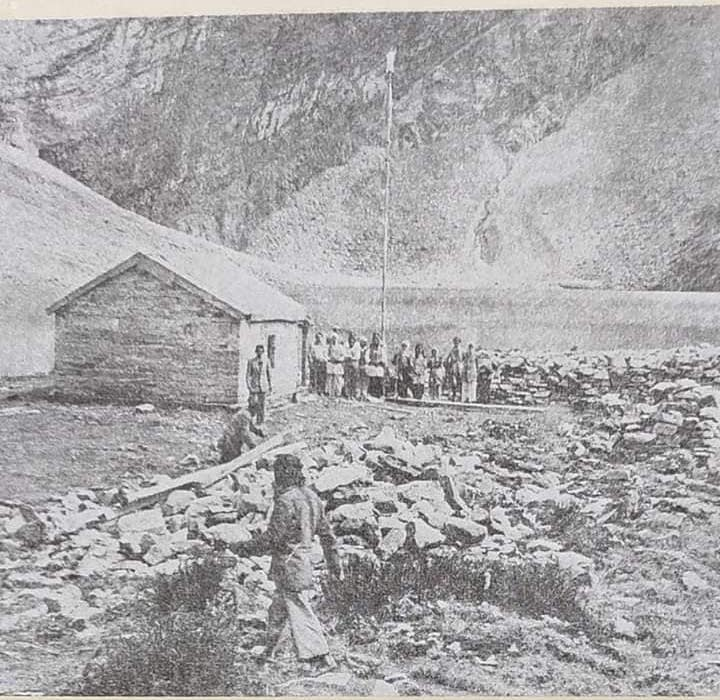
Photograph of a group of Sikh pilgrims praying at Gurdwara Hemkunt Sahib in 1960

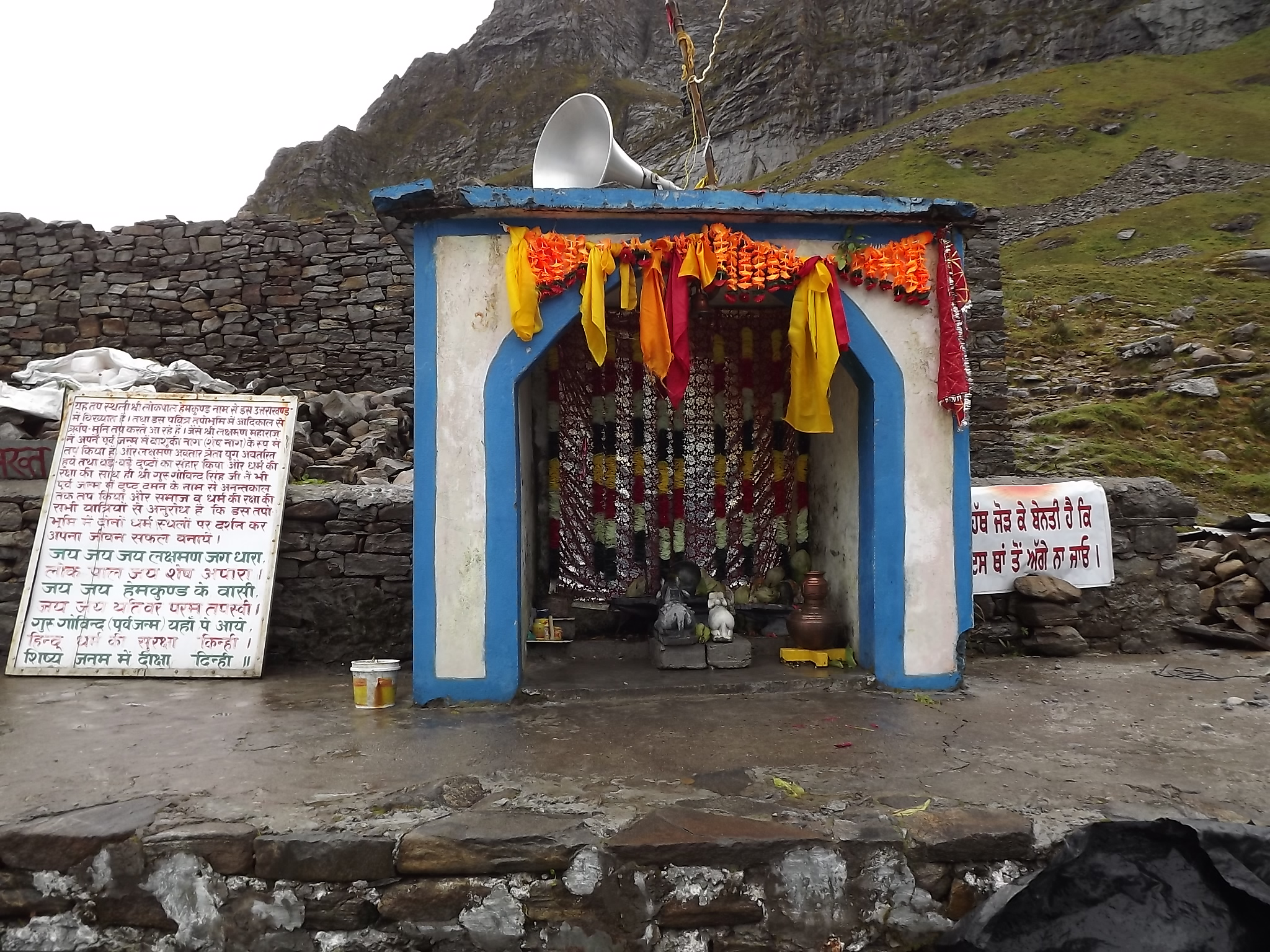
Shri Lakshman Lokpal Mandir Parisar

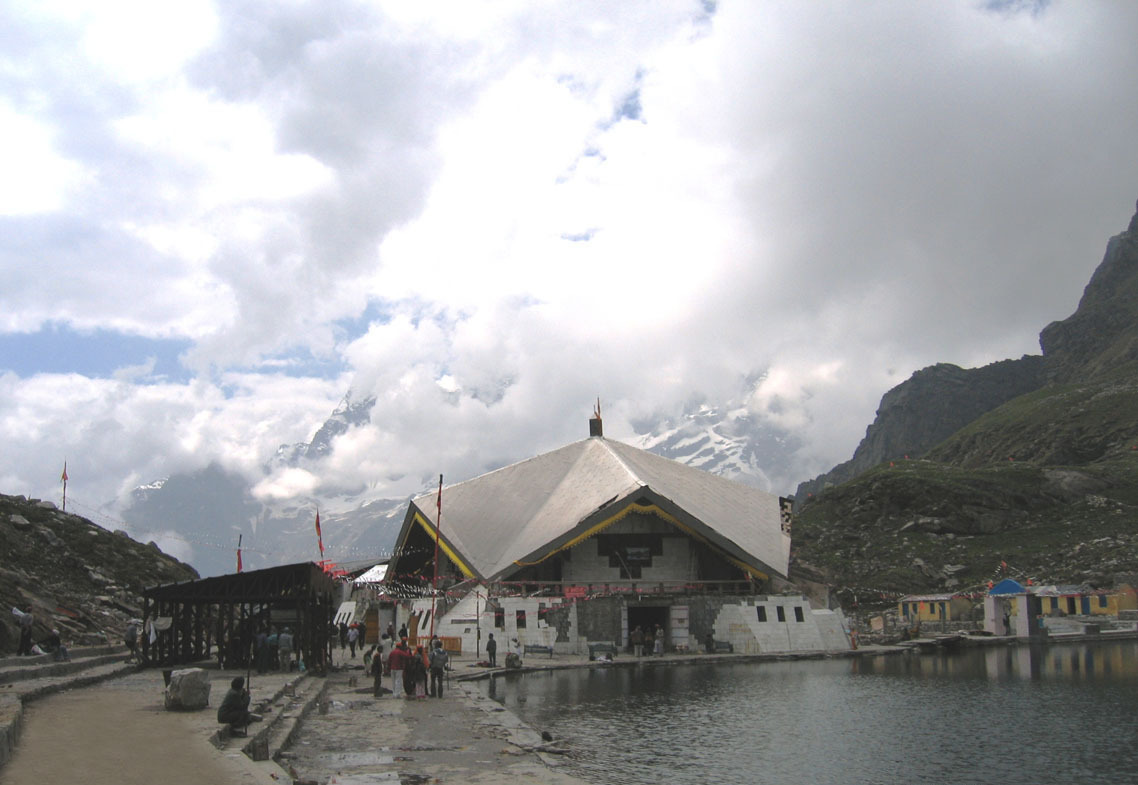
Gurdwara Hemkunt Sahib

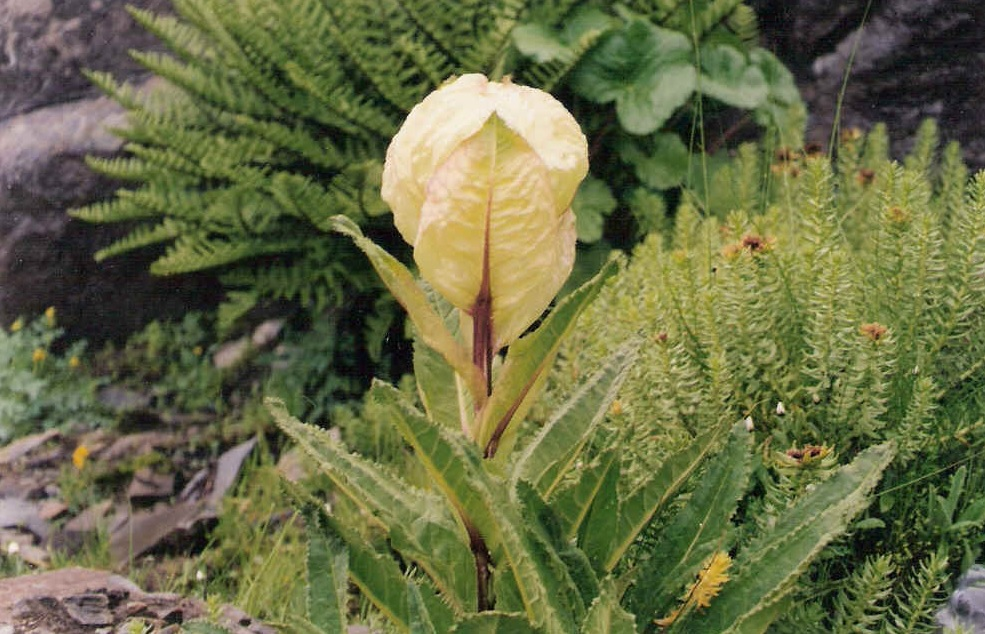
Brahmkamal

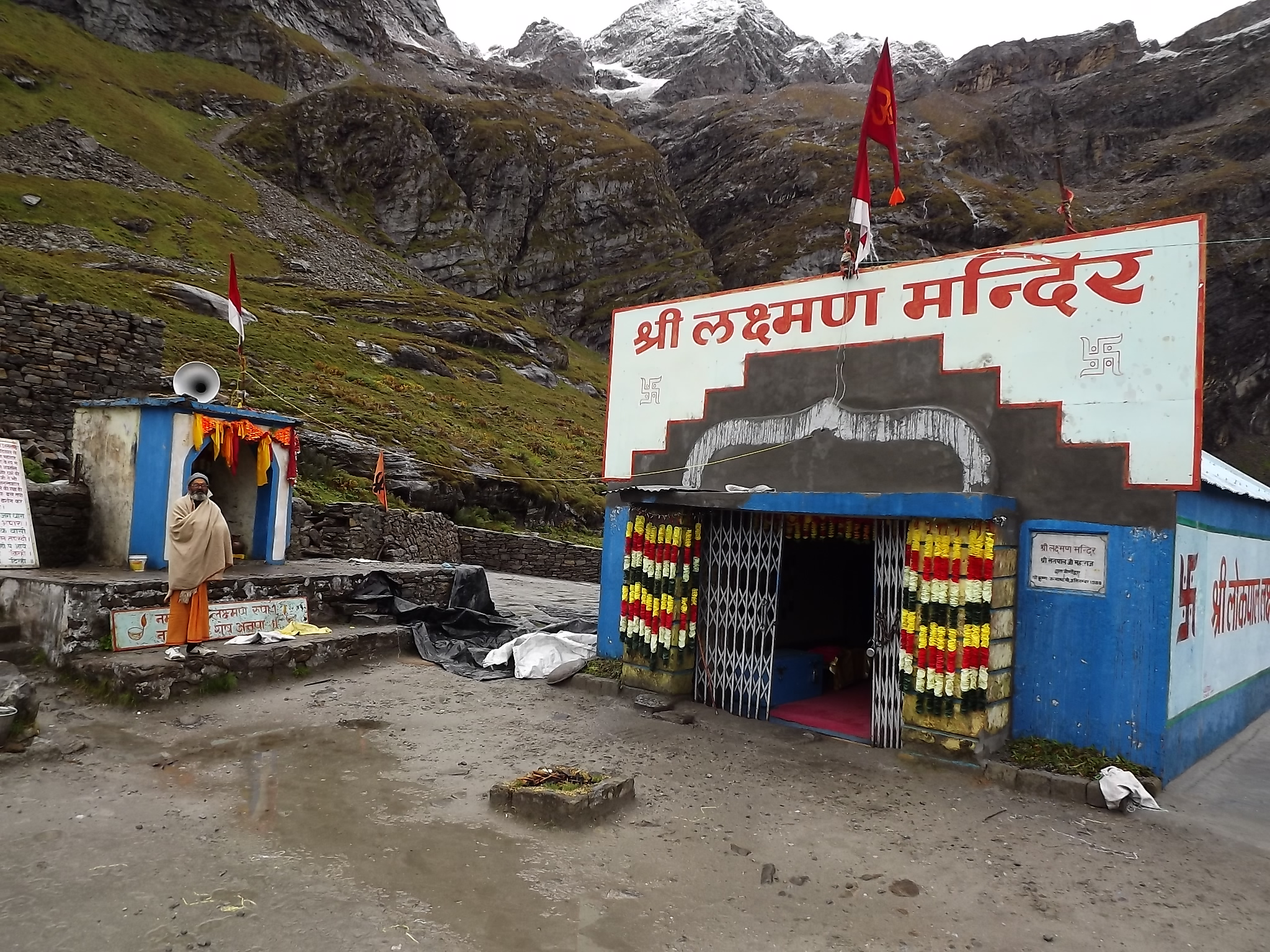
Shri Lakshman Mandir
