= Operation Sindhu =

Evacuation of Indians from Iran

- Part of the Twelve-Day War
- Operational scope: Humanitarian relief
- Planned by: Ministry of External Affairs
- Objective: Evacuation of Indian nationals from Iran
- Date: 18 June 2025 – 27 June 2025
- Executed by: Ministry of External Affairs
- Outcome: 4,429 people evacuated
- Casualties: None killed None injured

The Operation Sindhu is an evacuation operation launched by India to evacuate Indian nationals from Iran following the escalation of the Twelve-Day War.

== Background ==
On 13 June, Israel struck Iranian nuclear sites across Iran, prompting response from Iran. This marked a major escalation and the beginning of the Twelve-Day War. Both countries launched missile and drone strikes upon one another resulting in Indian students becoming stuck in the midst of the conflict.

== Routes ==
The first 110 Indian students were evacuated to Armenia. The Government of India expressed gratitude to Armenia for their assistance in the process.

== Operation ==
There are thousands of Indian nationals in Iran. The number of students being estimated 1,500-2,000 and thousands of professionals, workers, maritime personnel.

As the first step of the operation, India has already evacuated 110 Indians and assisted them onto entering Armenia. The commercial aircraft operated by IndiGo, which took it's departure on 18 June from Yerevan, Armenia, is scheduled to land in New Delhi by the early hours of 19 June.

On 19 June, MEA announced their extension of Operation Sindhu by preparing the evacuation of India citizens from Israel.

On late 20 June, 290 students mostly from Jammu and Kashmir arrived at Delhi Airport. Two more flights were scheduled to bring 1,000 Indians by the next day.

On 21 June, two flights arrive in Delhi, evacuating hundreds of Indian students from Iran, the first flight arrived at Indira Gandhi International Airport at 4:30 PM on Saturday and the second plane arrived later that day, 827 Indian students were evacuated by 21 June. Nepali and Sri Lankan students were also evacuated by India. 162 Indian nationals were on the way to India from Israel.

On 22 June, a flight arrived at Delhi with 285 Indians, by adding to 1,713 Indians evacuated by the eighth batch.

On 23 June, 161 Indians had been evacuated from Israel and expected to arrive by 24 June. A total of 603 students taken out from Israel in two days.

On 24 June, 1,100 Indians from Iran and Israel arrived in India, by far evacuating 3,170 students.

On 26 June, 272 Indians along with three Nepalese citizens have been evacuated from Iran, by far evacuating 3,426 Indians.
