= Ministry of External Affairs (India) =

Government ministry of India

- Branch of Government of India

- Ministry of External Affairs of the Republic of India

Ministry overview
- Formed: September 1946
- Jurisdiction: Government of India
- Headquarters: Jawaharlal Nehru Bhawan Janpath, New Delhi
- Employees: IFS (A): 954; IFS (B): 4,297
- Annual budget: ₹22,118.97 crore (US$2.3 billion) (2026–27)
- Minister responsible: Subrahmanyam Jaishankar, Minister of External Affairs
- Deputy Ministers responsible: Kirti Vardhan Singh, MoS; Pabitra Margherita, MoS
- Ministry executives: Vikram Misri, Foreign Secretary; Sibi George, Secretary (West); Rudrendra Tandon, Secretary (East); Sripriya Ranganatha, Secretary (CPV & OIA); Vacant, Secretary (Economic Relations); Vacant, Secretary (South); Randhir Jaiswal, AS-XP and Spokesperson
- Website: mea.gov.in

The Ministry of External Affairs (abbreviated as MEA; ISO: Vidēśa Mantrālaya) is a ministry of the Government of India tasked with India's foreign policy and relations. The Ministry is headed by the Minister of External Affairs, a member of the Prime Minister's Cabinet. The Minister is typically assisted by one or more junior ministers, known as Ministers of State (MoS) for External Affairs. The Foreign Secretary of the Republic of India is the senior-most non-elected official and the administrative head of the ministry.

The Ministry of External Affairs operates more than 200 diplomatic missions around the world through which it represents the Government of India on the international stage. In addition, the Ministry is responsible for India's representation at the United Nations and other international organizations. The Ministry is also responsible for the repatriation of Indian citizens in danger abroad and in the extradition of fugitives who have fled India. The Ministry of External Affairs may also advise other ministries and state governments in their interactions with foreign entities and brief them on pertinent international developments.

The Parliamentary Standing Committee on External Affairs, consisting of elected members from both the Lok Sabha and the Rajya Sabha, is tasked with this ministry's legislative oversight.

As of March 2025, the ministry has the current sanctioned strength of IFS (A) is 1,177 and General Cadre IFS (B) is 2,379, Stenographers' Cadre is 1,209, other cadre is 1,150 and local cadre is 3,119.

== History ==
The Ministry was initially the Ministry of External Affairs and Commonwealth Relations, a holdover from the British Raj. It was renamed the Ministry of External Affairs in 1948. Prime Minister Jawaharlal Nehru held the portfolio as an additional charge till his death in 1964 and it was only then that a separate Minister with Cabinet rank was appointed. The ministry is responsible for the administration of Naga Hills, Tuensang Area, the Emigration Act of 1983, the Reciprocity Act of 1943, the Port Haj Committee Act of 1932, the Indian Merchant Shipping Act in so far as it relates to pilgrim ships, the Indian Pilgrim Shipping Rules of 1933, the Protection of Pilgrims Act of 1887 (Bombay) and the Protection of the Mohammedan Pilgrims Act of 1896 (Bengal).

The Ministry was integrated with Ministry of Overseas Indian Affairs on 7 January 2016. The government said that the decision was taken in line with government's "overall objective of minimizing government and maximizing governance" and that it will help the government address duplication as well as unnecessary delays.

The Ministry is the cadre-controlling authority of the Indian Foreign Service; the service is wholly under the administration and supervision of the External Affairs Ministry.

== Organizational structure ==
The Ministry of External Affairs is headed by the Minister of External Affairs (or simply, the Foreign Minister; in Hindi: Videsh Mantri).The Foreign Secretary is the most senior civil servant who is the head of the Department of Foreign Affairs, and is supported by other secretary level officers.

Minister of External Affairs
Subrahmanyam Jaishankar
Minister of State			Minister of State		
Kirti Vardhan Singh			Pabitra Margherita		
Foreign Secretary
Vikram Misri
Secretary (West)	Secretary (East)	Secretary (South)	Secretary (Economic Relations)	Secretary (Consular, Passport, Visa and Overseas Indian Affairs)	Special Secretary & Financial Adviser
Sibi George	Rudrendra Tandon	Vacant	Vacant	Sripriya Ranganathan	Anurag Agarwal

Official Spokesperson of the Ministry of External Affairs
Randhir Jaiswal

=== Divisions ===
Division	Scope
A & RM (Acquisition & Resource Management) Division	Manages acquisition and resources of MEA.
Administration Division	Handles administrative matters, cadre management, official language, and procedures.
AMS (Americas) Division	Handles United States and Canada.
BM (Bangladesh–Myanmar) Division	Covers Bangladesh and Myanmar.
BIMSTEC and SAARC Division	Handles all matters relating to BIMSTEC (Bay of Bengal Initiative for Multi-Sectoral Technical and Economic Cooperation) and the SAARC.
Central and West Africa Division	Covers Nigeria, Ghana, Senegal, Ivory Coast, and other nations.
CCCS (Centre of Contemporary China Studies) Division	Coordinates research, analysis, and policy matters related to contemporary developments in China through the Centre for Contemporary China Studies.
Central America Division	Covers Mexico, Belize, Guatemala, Honduras, El Salvador, Nicaragua, Costa Rica, Panama, and Caribbean states.
CPV Division	Handles consular, passport, and visa services.
CT (Counter Terrorism) Division	Deals with counter-terrorism and security cooperation.
Cyber Diplomacy Division	Manages cyber-policy and digital diplomacy.
D&ISA (Disarmament & International Security Affairs) Division	Focuses on arms control, non‑proliferation, and international security.
DPA‑I	Handles concessional loans to partner countries.
DPA‑II	Capacity development and South‑South cooperation.
DPA‑III	Manages grant-assistance projects.
DPA‑IV	Cultural-heritage and restoration projects abroad.
Diaspora Engagement Division	Programmes for Global Engagement with the diaspora, PBD, SPDC, KIP, PCTD, PTDY, databases, and student/women support abroad.
East Asia Division	Covers China, Japan, South Korea, Mongolia, North Korea.
East and Southern Africa Division	Covers Kenya, Ethiopia, South Africa, Tanzania, Uganda, Zambia, Zimbabwe, Malawi, and others.
Economic Diplomacy Division	Handles trade, investment, and energy diplomacy.
EP & W (Emigration Policy & Welfare) Division	Migration, mobility, and welfare for Indian workers abroad.
Establishment Division	Manages establishment matters like property, accommodation, and equipment.
Eurasia Division	Handles all matters relating to Belarus, Kazakhstan, Kyrgyzstan, Russia, Tajikistan, Turkmenistan, Ukraine, and Uzbekistan.
Europe West Division	Covers Andorra, Belgium, France, Germany, (Republic of Ireland) Ireland, Italy, Luxembourg, Monaco, Netherlands, Portugal, San Marino, Spain, United Kingdom, and (European Union) EU.
Finance Division	Budget and expenditure of the Ministry.
GEM (Global Estate Management) Division	Manages estates and properties abroad.
G20 Division	Coordinates G20 matters.
Gulf Division	Covers Saudi Arabia, (United Arab Emirates) UAE, Qatar, Oman, Bahrain, Kuwait, Yemen.
Indian Ocean Region (IOR) Division	Covers Maldives, Mauritius, Sri Lanka, Seychelles, Madagascar, Comoros.
Indo-Pacific Division	Oversees strategic regional Indo-Pacific issues.
Liaison Officer for Other Backward Classes of the Ministry	Liaison and monitoring of OBC policies.
Liaison Officer for Scheduled Castes / Scheduled Tribes / Persons with Disabilities of the Ministry	Liaison and monitoring of SC/ST/PD policies.
MEA Library	Library and information management at Patiala House.
MER (Multilateral Economic Relations) Division	Handles WTO, IMF, World Bank, and multilateral economic issues.
NEST Division	Deals with new, emerging, and strategic technologies.
Northern Division	Covers Nepal and Bhutan.
Northern Europe Division	Covers Sweden, Norway, Finland, Poland, Hungary, Denmark, Estonia, Latvia, Lithuania.
OE & PGE (Overseas Employments & Protectorate General of Emigrants)	Oversees Indian employment abroad and protection.
Oceania Division	Covers Australia, New Zealand, Fiji, Papua New Guinea, Solomon Islands, Vanuatu, and other Pacific nations.
PAI (Pakistan–Afghanistan–Iran) Division	Covers Pakistan, Afghanistan, Iran.
PP & R (Policy Planning & Research) Division	Mid-/long-term policy planning and research.
Protocol Division	Manages protocol, diplomatic privileges, and VVIP visits.
RTI (Right to Information) Cell	Implements Right to Information Act 2005 in the Ministry.
SCO (Shanghai Cooperation Organisation) Division	Handles SCO matters and India’s engagement.
Southern Division	Covers Brunei, Cambodia, Indonesia, Laos, Malaysia, Philippines, Singapore, Thailand, (Timor-Leste) Timor Leste, and Vietnam.
Southern Europe Division	Covers Italy, Portugal, Greece, Albania, Bulgaria, Croatia, Bosnia and Herzegovina, Serbia, Montenegro, and other nearby nations.
South America Division	Covers Brazil, Argentina, Chile, Colombia, Peru, Venezuela, Ecuador, Bolivia, Uruguay, Paraguay, and other countries.
Special Projects Division (SPD)	Handles highly specialized, time-sensitive or cross-cutting institutional and strategic diplomatic assignments (Such as initiatives which need involvment of multiple Divisions, etc.)
UNES (United Nations Economic & Social) Division	Handles India’s UN economic, social, and sustainable development engagement.
UNP (United Nations Political) Division	Handles UN political, security, Security Council, and peacekeeping matters.
WANA (West Asia & North Africa) Division	Covers Israel, Jordan, Lebanon, Egypt, Morocco, Tunisia, Algeria, Libya, and other WANA countries.
Welfare Division	Welfare policies and programs for Ministry employees.
XPD (External Publicity & Public Diplomacy) Division	Manages media, publicity, website, new media, publications, and soft power initiatives.

Source: Ministry of External Affairs (India)

== Development Partnership Administration ==
Development Partnership Administration (DPA) is an agency under the Ministry of External Affairs formed in 2013 to increase its strategic footprint and for the effective execution of projects with professionals from diverse backgrounds. India has an elaborate project portfolio in its neighbourhood, including Bhutan, Nepal, Afghanistan, Maldives, Sri Lanka, and Bangladesh, as well as Africa and Latin America. It is headed by Sujata Mehta, one of India's foremost diplomats and former Indian representative to the UN Conference on Disarmament, Geneva. Mehta is Special Secretary in the MEA. According to OECD estimates, 2019 official development assistance from India increased to US$1.6 billion.

== Location ==
The majority of the offices of the Ministry are located in the Jawaharlal Nehru Bhawan at Janpath Road. Other offices are located at Kartavya Bhawan-3, Sushma Swaraj Bhawan at Chanakyapuri, Shastri Bhawan, Patiala House, and the ISIL Building.

== Parliamentary Standing Committee ==
Parliamentary Standing Committee on External Affairs is mandated with the task of the legislative oversight of the Ministry of External Affairs.

In March 2023, the committee in its Demand for Grants (2023–24) report, criticized the ministry for being "most short-staffed" and under-budgeted. The committee highlighted that The total strength of 4,888 is distributed across different cadres of the Ministry such as the Indian Foreign Service (IFS), IFS General Cadre, IFS Group B, Stenographers Cadre, Interpreters Cadre, Legal and Treaties Cadre, among others. The cadre strength of Indian Foreign Service Officers is only 1,011, just 22.5 percent of the total strength. Out of IFS 'A' cadre, 667 are posted at the Missions abroad and 334 are manning the headquarters in Delhi, which currently has 57 divisions. The committee also highlighted that the ministry “remains one amongst the least funded central ministries” as its actual annual spending has been around 0.4% of the total budgetary allocation of the government since 2020–21.

== List of operations by the Ministry of External Affairs (India) ==
This is a list of major operations carried out by the Ministry of External Affairs (India).

Year	Operation	Region	Description	References
1990	1990 airlift of Indians from Kuwait	Kuwait	Evacuation of over 170,000 Indians during the Iraqi invasion of Kuwait & Gulf War, one of the largest civilian evacuations in history.	
2015	Operation Raahat	Yemen	Evacuation of ~4,640 Indians and 960 foreign nationals during the Yemen civil war.	
2015	Operation Maitri	Nepal	Earthquake relief operation evacuating ~43,000 Indians, over 150 foreign tourist were evacuated and were provided transit visa to as many as 785 foreigners	
2018	Operation Samudra Maitri	Indonesia	Disaster relief operation post-Sulawesi earthquake and tsunami.	
2021	Operation Devi Shakti	Afghanistan	Evacuation of 800 Indian nationals and minorities after Taliban takeover.	
2022	Operation Ganga	Ukraine	Evacuation of ~25,000 Indian nationals & 147 citizens of 18 other countries were evacuated during Russia–Ukraine war.	
2023	Operation Kaveri	Sudan	Evacuation of ~3,897 Indians during Sudan crisis.	
2023	Operation Ajay	Israel	Evacuation of 1,400 Indian nationals during Israel–Hamas war.	
2025	Operation Brahma	Myanmar	Relief mission after Myanmar earthquake; 625 MT aid, NDRF, IAF deployed.	
2025	Operation Sindhu	Iran	Evacuation of 110 Indian students amid Twelve-Day War.	
2025	Operation Sagar Bandhu	Sri Lanka	Operation Sagar Bandhu is India’s rapid HADR mission to aid cyclone- and flood-hit Sri Lanka after Cyclone Ditwah.	
2026	Operation Amistad	Venezuela	The MEA launched Operation Amistad after powerful earthquakes measuring 7.2 and 7.5 magnitude hit Venezuela on June 24, leaving more than 2,295 people dead, over 11,000 injured, and causing extensive destruction across the country. The Indian Air Force had send two C17s including a specialised Indian Army's medical contingent, a fully equipped field hospital, medicines, medical equipment and relief supplies aimed at supporting ongoing rescue and rehabilitation efforts. The medical mission has been warmly received by residents affected by the disaster.	

== See also ==
- Raisina Dialogue
- Minister of External Affairs (India)
- Indian Council of World Affairs
- Chanakyapuri
- List of diplomatic missions in India
- List of diplomatic missions of India
