= Mridula Bhatkar =

Indian Judge

Hon'ble Ms. Justice Mridula Bhatkar

Judge of the Bombay High Court
- In office 10 February 2009 – 27 May 2019
- Nominated by: K.G. Balakrishnan
- Appointed by: A.P.J. Abdul Kalam

Personal details
- Born: 28 May 1957 (age 69)
- Education: Savitribai Phule Pune University

Mridula Bhatkar (born 28 May 1957) is a former judge of the Bombay High Court, in Maharashtra, India, serving on the court between 2009 and 2019. She adjudicated in several notable cases during her tenure as a judge, including the Jalgaon rape case, the 2006 Mumbai train bombings, and the conviction of Gujarat police officers and doctors in the 2002 gangrape of Bilkis Bano.

== Career ==
Bhatkar enrolled with the Bar Council of Maharashtra and Goa in 1982 and practiced law in Pune, Maharashtra. Between 1990 and 1992, she was a visiting faculty member at ILS Law College in Pune, and also at the Department of Journalism in Savitribai Phule Pune University, where she taught a course on law and the press.

On 21 April 1993, she was appointed a City Civil and Sessions Judge in Mumbai, and later served as the Principal Judge in Kolhapur, Maharashtra, as well. She was appointed Registrar-General of the Bombay High Court in 2008, and served in that capacity until she was appointed an additional judge of the Bombay High Court on 10 February 2009. She retired from judicial service on 27 May 2019.

=== Significant judgments ===
==== Judgments concerning family law ====
In 2011, Bhatkar heard a case filed by a member of the Jain religion, arguing that his child, aged 8, had voluntarily taken a religious vow of celibacy and spirituality, after the Child Welfare Committee raised concerns about the child's physical and mental health. During the hearings, Bhatkar had raised questions about the child's rights under the Constitution. The case is yet to be decided.

In 2012, Bhatkar ruled that children who were adopted by other families did not have any legal claim to inheriting property from their biological parents.

==== Judgments concerning criminal law ====
Bhatkar has adjudicated in a number of significant cases relating to criminal law in India. in 2010, she refused to allow a petition seeking the constitution of a review committee to examine the authorisation of surveillance and interrogation under the Maharashtra Control of Organised Crime Act, holding that while this would be a "welcome step," it should be done at the initiative of the State Government, and not the courts.

On 12 January 2017, Bhatkar granted bail to three men belonging to a Hindu extremist group, the Hindu Rashtra Sena, who had been convicted of murdering a Muslim man by beating him to death with hockey sticks, in the Pune techie murder case. Bhatkar ruled that the three attackers had been provoked to commit the attack for religious reasons, by leaders of the Hindu Rashtra Sena, and that this justified her order granting them bail. The order was widely criticized, and is being reviewed by the Supreme Court of India.

In 2018, she rebuked the Maharashtra police for leaking information to the media in relation to ongoing cases filed against persons arrested following the 2018 Bhima Koregaon violence. Bhatkar also allowed the transfer of the persons accused of murdering journalist Gauri Lankesh from Karnataka to Maharashtra, to allow them to be interrogated in relation to the murder of scholars and activists Narendra Dabholkar and Govind Pansare.

==== Judgments concerning sexual violence ====
Bhatkar has also made several significant rulings in connection to criminal law and sexual violence. In 2011, Bhatkar ruled that the state could not appeal against a ruling that six men were found not guilty of raping an American student at the Tata Institute of Social Sciences, after she awoke in a state of undress and was forced by them to consume contraceptive pills. Bhatkar and another judge, Naresh Patil, found that this was insufficient evidence of sexual assault and barred the appeal. In 2017, Bhatkar, along with another judge, Girish Kulkarni, and several other persons appointed to a panel by the Bombay High Court, recommended increasing the maximum compensation that could be granted under the Manodhairya Yojana scheme, which allows financial recompense to child and adult survivors of sexual assault, and acid attacks.

Bhatkar has also made significant rulings to the law governing consent to sexual acts. In 2015, Bhatkar granted bail to a 20-year-old man who was charged with sexually assaulting a minor girl aged 15, holding that the relationship was, in her view, consensual and that this constituted 'mitigating circumstances' to justify bail. She ruled in 2017, that when consent to sexual intercourse was provided under a false promise of a future marriage, it did not constitute rape, but allowed the person accused of this to be tried instead for offences of cheating, criminal intimidation, and assault. In the same year, Bhatkar ruled that provisions of the Indian Penal Code should be interpreted to mean that informed consent does not include consent provided under the influence of intoxicants such as alcohol.

Bhatkar notably adjudicated in a case filed by Bilkis Bano, upholding the life sentence awarded to eleven men who were convicted of committing the offence of gang-rape against Bano and of murdering her family, during the 2002 Gujarat riots. Along with Justice V. K. Tahilramani, she held that the Gujarat police had deliberately failed to record Bano's complaint and were complicit in actively impeding the investigation. Six policemen were among the convicted persons. The Supreme Court upheld their order, and further directed the Gujarat government to pay Bano compensation.

In an interview to Indian Express prior to her retirement in 2019, she expressed support for the #MeToo movement in India, noting that the facts of a case concerning sexual assault might be uncovered or disclosed many years after the commission of the offence. She also stated in an interview with The Times of India, that certain laws protecting women were necessary in light of patriarchal institutions and customs in India.

Judgments concerning gender and sexuality

In a significant decision concerning constitutional law, Bhatkar held in 2011 that a Maharashtra government law increasing the number of seats reserved for women in local government bodies from 33% to 50% was constitutional and refused to strike it down.

In 2019, Bhatkar passed one of the first orders dismissing charges against a person accused of homosexuality, after the Indian Supreme Court decriminalised consensual sex between same-sex adults in Navtej Singh Johar v Union of India.

== Writing ==
In 2016, while still a judge, Bhatkar published a book of Marathi poetry, titled Kavita Manatlya, Kavita Courtatlya (Poems from the Heart, poems from the Court).

She has disclosed two forthcoming books that she is writing; a biography of her husband, the actor Ramesh Bhatkar, and a memoir about her experiences as a judge.

== Personal life ==
Bhatkar earned a Bachelor's in Arts from Pune University, as well as a post-graduate degree in journalism before earning a law degree from the same institution. Her husband, Ramesh Bhatkar, was a Marathi film, TV, and stage actor, who died in February 2019. They have one son.

Ramesh Bhatkar; husband of Mrudula Bhatkar was a Marathi film actor and also featured in many a TV serials such as Commando, Hello Inspector etc. In year 2007 Ramesh Bhatkar was accused of molesting a film aspirant girl of 18 years of age and a criminal case of molestation came to be registered at Wanawadi Police Station in Pune city. Ramesh managed to get a protection from arrest in terms of Anticipatory Bail and later came to be discharged by Bombay High Court. Mrudula Bhatkar has elicited this bitter experience in her recently released book, "हे सांगायला हवं" (Hey Sangaayalaa Hava—This must be told).

It was a bitter coincidence in the life of a woman judge who was vociferously condemning the accused in her verdicts in cases of crimes against women that her husband had to face charges on similar count. All accused in the case got relief from various courts including from Bombay High Court in the case which came to an abrupt halt in a short time.
