= Hindu Rashtra (disambiguation) =

Hindu Rashtra, literally Hindu nation, refers to the Hindu theocratic state sought to be established by Hindutva ideologues in India.

Hindu Rashtra may also refer to:

- Hindu Rashtra Sena, an Indian Hindu nationalist group and political party
- Hindu Rashtra (book), by Indian journalist Ashutosh
- Hindu Rashtra Dal, defunct Hindu nationalist organization associated with Nathuram Godse, the assassin of Mahatma Gandhi

== See also ==
- Ram Rajya (disambiguation)
- Our Hindu Rashtra, a book by Indian writer Aakar Patel
- Akhand Bharat (lit. 'Undivided India'), an Indian irredentist concept
