= Rashtriya Sikh Sangat =

Sikh organisation affiliated with the Rashtriya Swayamsevak Sangh

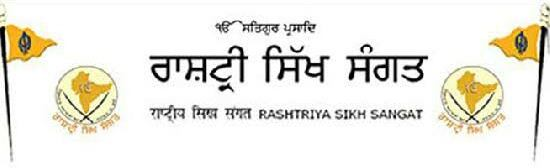
- Formation: 24 November 1986 (39 years ago)
- Headquarters: Sangat Marg, Ram Nagar, Paharganj, New Delhi, Delhi 110055
- Region served: India
- President: Gurcharan Singh Gill
- General Secretary: Avtar Singh Shastri
- Mukhya Samrakshak: Chiranjeev Singh
- Parent organisation: Rashtriya Swayamsevak Sangh
- Affiliations: Bharatiya Janata Party; Sangh Parivar
- Volunteers: ▲50,000–100,000+
- Website: https://web.archive.org/web/20081201075644/http://www.sangatsansar.com/

The Rashtriya Sikh Sangat (lit. 'National Sikh Association') is an India-based Sikh affiliate of the Rashtriya Swayamsevak Sangh, a right-wing Hindutva paramilitary organisation. It works toward the promotion of brotherhood between Hindus and Sikhs in Punjab. It is most active in Punjab, Haryana, and parts of Rajasthan. It has been opposed by mainstream Sikh institutions (who also oppose the RSS, its parent organization), such as the Akal Takht. In 2004, it was shunned in an edict by the Akal Takht for being associated with the RSS, declared as "anti-panthic forces". Due to opposition by Sikhs, the organization has made limited inroads in Punjab.

== Name ==
The term rashtriya refers to the nation (as the group operates in India) while sangat refers to the Sikh concept of community.

== Activities and ideology ==
According to Christine Moliner, the organization was founded "to propagate among the Sikh masses the idea that they belong to the Hindu fold". In the Hindutva ideological framework, Sikhs are reimagined as "the sword-arm of Hinduism". Rashtriya Sikh Sangat was inspired by the Hindu nationalist organisation Rashtriya Swayamsevak Sangh to unite Hindus and Sikh, promoting a universal brotherhood it calls Sanjhiwalta. However, it has stated publicly that it respects the separate religious identity of Sikhs, with the Punjab unit of the parent RSS also affirming the same. Furthermore, it stated that its ultimate aim is to integrate Sikhs into mainstream nationalism, with Hinduism serving as a nationality rather than as a religion. Sikh and Muslim members of the RSS are not bound to attend shakhas or to undergo the more rigorous training given to Hindu members. It stresses importance on gurbani (including its propagation) and seeks to address issues related to society, religion, economics, and security. It believes in Akhand Bharat. The motto of the group is Hindustan Samalasi Bola. It describes itself as a socio-cultural organization rather than a religious one.

Some resolutions that the group has issued include the following demands:

- proper restoration and maintenance of Sikh sites and properties now located in Pakistan, and likewise for Hindu sites there
- simplification of the visa procedure between India and Pakistan to facilitate easier cross-border interaction
- Punjabi (in Gurmukhi) be adopted as the second official language and script in Himachal Pradesh, Haryana, Delhi, and Uttarakhand, with proper education in it being made available
- renaming educational institutions after Sikh figures and improving education related to Sikhism
- the construction of a Ram Mandir
- prosecution of those involved in violence during the 1984 anti-Sikh riots, including an inquiry and compensation to victims
- Afghan Sikh refugees fleeing the Taliban be given residence in India
- protection of the rights of Sikh farmers in the Terai belt of Uttarakhand (Varg 4)
- not associating terrorist acts with a religious identity marker

It opposes Christian missionaries. Associated activities of the parent RSS in Punjab including ghar wapsi drives, seeking to "re-convert" Christians back to Sikhism and Hinduism. The group also facilitates understanding between the main RSS and Sikh hardliners. It operates camps to educate on the teachings of the Guru Granth Sahib. In Jaipur, it operates a training programme for unemployed women. There were plans for a Viklang Vridh Dham in Bharatpur to provide boarding and lodging to abandoned handicapped and elderly people and to provide education to the poor.

The popularity of the group increased in Punjab beginning in 1999, with it conducting literature and calendar distributions, and organizing meetings with government-allocated funds. The RSS and its affiliates in Punjab saw the most growth during coalition BJP-Akali Dal state governments, such as in the periods of 1997–2002 and 2007–2017. In 2004, it was reported that the organization runs units in 600 cities of 18 states of India, with most of these units being urban except in Punjab and Rajasthan, where village units operated as well. The group runs branches called ekais, analogous to the shakhas of the parent RSS. There were reportedly around 500 ekais of the group in 2017. With about 450+ ekais (shakas, units) predominantly in the states of Rajasthan, Haryana, Punjab, Gujarat, Delhi, Uttar Pradesh, Madhya Pradesh, Maharashtra and as also presence in other states. Meanwhile the parent RSS in Punjab operated 600 shakhas in 2014 which increased to 900 by 2017. The Sikh wing also operates chintan vargas (training camps). The Rashtriya Sikh Sangat’s Kshetriya Sanghathan Mantri of Punjab, Jasbir Singh, stated that it does not publicly disclose membership due to external threats but said the group's membership was in the thousands. It operated a website at sangatsansar.com launched in 2008 in three languages (Punjabi, Hindi, and English) to educate on Sikh history, gurus, and gurdwaras, but it is now defunct.

== History ==
=== Background ===
In colonial Punjab, the Arya Samaj (est. 1875) and Singh Sabha (est. 1873) were Hindu and Sikh reformist movements founded in the late 19th century. Initially conciliatory to one another (allied by their joint opposition to Christian and Muslim missionaries), their relations later turned hostile when the Samaj attempted to convert Sikhs to their organization and Dayananda characterizing Sikhism as a failed reformist movement. The Arya Samaj had asserted that Sikhs are Hindus and sought to convert Sikhs to Arya Samaj through the use of the shuddhi ceremony, with a notable example being the 1900 conversion of Rahtia Sikhs. For this, they were opposed by the Sikh leaders of the Singh Sabha movement, who instead advocated that Sikhs were a distinct religious community from Hindus, argued as such in Kahn Singh Nabha's treatise Ham Hindu Nahin. This led to a deterioration of inter-religious relations between the two communities. The Singh Sabha began to view the Samaj as their prime threat. By the 1920s, differences in perspective were entrenched amongst the Sikhs. After Indian independence, Hukam Singh in 1949 made a speech regarding the treatment of Sikhs as a religious minority.

The parent RSS viewed Sikhs, Jains, and Buddhists as being "sects" of Hinduism rather than independent religions. According to the early RSS leaders, a "true Sikh" is a Hindu and that Sikhs are the protectors of Hindus, with this belief being espoused in Savarkar's Essentials of Hindutva and Golwalkar’s Bunch of Thoughts. Sarvarkar in his work stated that Sikhs are "natural Hindus" and that Sikhs should not see themselves as separate from Hindus or else they are traitors while those Sikhs who viewed themselves as Hindus were "lions":

... the Sikhs are the almost direct descendants of those ancient Sindhus. ... This minority of the Hindus as well as the major communities of them did not fall from the sky as separate creations ... Really if any community is India is Hindu beyond cavil or criticism it is our Sikh brotherhood … The Sikh of today is the Hindu of yesterday. ... As their Gurus themselves had been the children of Hindus they would fail to understand if not resent any such attempt to class them as Non-Hindus. ... Sikhs, to guard their own interests, could have pressed for and succeeded in securing special representation … as our non-Brahmins and other communities have done without renouncing their birthright of Hindutva. ... You cannot pick up a lamb and by tying a Kachchha and Kripan on it, make a lion of it! If the Guru succeeded in forming a band of martyrs and warriors he could do so because the race that produced him as well as that band was capable of being moulded thus… as soon as you point at a Sikh who was true to his Guru you have automatically pointed at a Hindu. ... So long as our Sikh brethren are true to Sikhism they must of necessity continue to be Hindus.

— Vinayak Damodar Savarkar, Essentials of Hindutva (1923)

When Sarvarkar had met an anti-Brahmin Sikh, who had blamed the deaths of some of the relatives of Guru Gobind Singh on a Brahmin cook, Sarvarkar labelled the Sikh as a "dacoit" but praises another Sikh as a "gentleman" who refuted the former's claim by stating that many Brahmins sheltered the Sikh guru. Furthermore, Sarvarkar opined that it was actually a group of Sikhs who had abandoned the guru's service which had led the guru to seeking out the assistance of the Brahmin cook as a "desperate sortie", which led to tragedy, thus as per him the fault is shared by those Sikhs as well instead of blame being assigned solely to the Brahmin. Sarvarkar notes that Sikhs may be a separate religious identity but that they share a singular and indivisible racial, national, and cultural identity with Hindus.

In 1947, the partition of Punjab led to Sikhs and Hindus on one side opposing Muslims on the other. In 1955, Om Prakasha Kahol formerly of the All-India Hindu Mahasabha wrote a polemical work addressing partition violence and the Punjabi Suba movement, urging a united front amongst Hindus, Jains, and Sikhs against Muslims while advocating for the creation of a Punjabi state. The author states:

A Sikh deceives none except himself if he regards Muslims as his better friends than Hindus.. For a Muslim, they are all 'Kafirs' or Hindus... The academic discussion, whether Sikhs or Buddhists are Hindus or not, is a peace time luxury. At the time of war, everybody at once comes to know... which camp he belongs to.

— Om Prakasha Kahol, Hindus and the Punjabi State (1955), page 14

Golwalkar in Bunch of Thoughts (1966) reiterates that Sikhs are a "devoted and heroic sword arm of Hinduism" but that "the poison of political ambition had roused the demon of separatism" despite claiming that "Guru Govind Singh had declared 'a true Sikh is one who has faith in the Vedas and Bhagavad Gita and who worships Rama and Krishna.' " He further denotes a "new" type of Sikh, who reject a Hindu identity and assert an independent one, with this kind of Sikh being admonished by him as forgetting the source of their inspiration and creation from Hindu samaj and dharma. Golwalkar further stated:

The Sikh sect … came into being to contain the spread of Islam in Punjab. Later on, recognising the need of the times, Guru Govind Singh, the tenth Guru of the Sikhs, armed his disciples and turned them into a band of national heroes.

— Madhav Sadashivrao Golwalkar, Bunch of Thoughts (1966)

=== Formation and early period ===
The group's own history blames the Congress government, "hardliner" Sikhs, and some Sanatanis for damaging relations between Sikhs and Hindus in the immediate decades after independence, the latter regarding the rejection of the Punjabi language and the resulting Punjabi Suba movement. It was believed by the RSS that the violence between Sikhs and Hindus during 1984 were due to a lack of communication between Sikhs and Hindus and them forgetting their mutual socio-cultural heritage. It was dangerous for Sikhs to travel outside Punjab into other parts of India due to distrust. In 1985, the RSS proposed the formation of a Sikh wing to be called the Rashtriya Sikh Sangat, with the work being carried out by Shamsher Singh, R. S.Narula, and Rajinder Singh (Rajju Bhaiya). A meeting was held at Deendayal Institute, Jhansi Road, New Delhi on 31 August 1986 for the purpose, presided over by Balwant Singh Bhalla, a 15th generation direct descendant of Guru Amar Das. The following aims were declared:

- Rejection of hatred and doubt
- Promotion of dialogue between Hindus and Sikhs
- Emphasis on shared culture and history
- Promotion of gurbani's message throughout India
- Carrying out of mutual disscussions, agreement, and trust to solve issues
- Attribution to the Sikh gurus' works and martyrdoms regarding present-day freedom
- Recognition of the Khalsa and the sacrifices of the Sikhs
- Educating Hindus on Sikhism
- Interpreting the Guru Granth Sahib through a nationalist and universalist lens, such as the inclusion of Bhagat Bani
- Respect for the religious identity and independence of the Sikhs while acknowledging "common rich heritage of this ancient country"

Furthermore, a seven-person committee was formed to finalize the setting-up of the organization, with the following members:

1. Shamsher Singh of Lucknow (National Convenor)
2. Aridaman Singh of Ludhiana (Member)
3. Brijbhushan Singh Bedi of Quadian (Member)
4. Vishawanath of Amritsar (Member)
5. Chiranjiv Singh of Patiala (Member)
6. Gajender Singh Sandhu of Rudrapur (Member)
7. Balwant Singh of Hyderabad (Member)

The seven-person committee met again on 23 November 1986 and the group was officially formed on 24 November 1986 with the name Rashtriya Sikh Sangat, on the occasion of Prakash Utsav of Guru Nanak. Its formation was inspired partly by the foundation of The Sikh Forum (est. 1985). The formation consisted also of a constitution and the planning of a first national conference.

The original stated aim of the group was to stress upon the shared heritage of Hindus and Sikhs based upon gurbani (which they believe is a realization of the concept of sarbat da bhalla), however it sought to aspire to Golwalkar's goal of integrating Sikhs into Hinduism. It would launch a social assimilation programme to bridge the gap between Hindus and Sikhs. As per Dhirendra Jha, the group opposed a distinct Sikh identity, which they viewed as an artificial product of the earlier British colonial administration and Max Arthur Macauliffe. They further claim that Sikhs during the Mughal period (including the Sikh gurus) saw themselves as Hindus rather than as a distinct group.

In 1988, the organization raised awareness regarding the alcohol and drug problem in the state of Punjab. Chiranjiiv Singh took over as president of the group in 1990. A large yatra named Brahmkund se Amritkund from Haridwar to Amritsar was held. In 1991, the group organized a prayer at Gurdwara Brahm Kund in Ayodhya for the success of the construction of a Ram Mandir in the same locality. The Akal Takht, dominated by the Jatt Sikhs, had opposed the group since its formation. To counter this, the group garnered favour amongst the historically marganized Dalit Sikhs, and established ties with dera organizations that were associated with low-caste Sikhs. In the late 1990s, RSS chief K. S. Sudarshan held meetings with the Damdami Taksal discussing Operation Blue Star and Sikh prisoners, with the RSS issuing a report on the Sikh detainees. The RSS report embarrassed the Akalis, who had promised but failed to release the prisoners, thus it improved the legitimacy of the RSS amongst the Sikhs. After the end of the Punjab insurgency and the ushering in of a joint BJP-Akali Dal alliance government which came into power in the state after the 1997 election, the group had more freedom to carry out its mission in the state, with one of its stated goals being the construction of a Ram Mandir in Punjab. In 1999 to mark the tercentenary celebrations of the Khalsa, the group organized a 300-strong sadhu march to Amritsar, which was termed a sant yatra that consisted of 24-day yatra that began in Patna Sahib and concluded at Anandpur Sahib, with Sikh sants from allover India taking part. The procession, which began on 24 March 1999, passed through Rajgir, Bodh Gaya, Kashi, and Ayodhya, reaching Amritsar on 10 April 1999, where it was received by major gurdwaras, including takhts. At the time, A. B. Vajpayee was the prime minister of India and P. S. Badal was chief minister of Punjab. Vajpayee's government issued 100 crore rupees for the 1999 celebration, of which a substantial amount was allocated to the Rashtriya Sikh Sangat. Around that time, the group approached the Damdami Taksal to have its members more thoroughly trained in Sikhism but left after being told that the Taksal would only educate amritdhari Sikhs. The group also issued a pamphlet that stated the following:

The followers of Lord Rama, Krishna and Guru Sahiban are not different but they are part of one society and that is the Hindu society.

— Rashtriya Sikh Sangat, excerpt of a pamphlet issued during the 1999 tercentenary celebrations of the Khalsa

In 2000, the group's leader attended the Millennium Peace Summit of Religious and Spiritual Leaders abroad to expand the influence of the organization in England and the United States. In early 2000, the RSS visited a Dalit Sikh colony and urged the residents demolish a local mosque. In December 2002, the group planned to conduct recitations of the Guru Granth Sahib in Hindu temples in Punjab but cancelled the idea due to hostility from Sikhs. Sikh groups retorted stating that the Guru Granth Sahib should not be read from in the presence of idols and then Jathedar of the Akal Takht likened the group to Aurangzeb in regard to religious conversion. In 2004, the group under the leadership of Gurcharan Singh Gill planned a march to mark the 400th anniversary of the Guru Granth Sahib's compilation (with five yatras meeting in Amritsar on August 31st of that year) but cancelled after they were met with resistance from the Akal Takht, which labelled the group "anti-panth" and for Sikhs to boycott it. The Akal Takht issued an edict on 13 July 2004, in response to what it saw as seditious literature produced by the group regarding Sikhism, for all Sikhs to shun the RSS and not associate with it, with it considering the RSS to be conducting a "a deep-rooted conspiracy against Sikhs". The Rashtriya Sikh Sangat then decreased their activities but alleged that the Sikh religious institutions were being influenced by diasporic Sikh radicals in their decisions against their group.

=== Assassination of Rulda Singh ===
In 2009, Khalistan Liberation Force and Babbar Khalsa, two Khalistani militant organisations assassinated Rulda Singh, the then president of the Rashtriya Sikh Sangat, in Patiala. It was the most visible terrorist action in the state since the 1990s.

=== 2010–present ===
In 2010, the group participated in the Haridwar Mahakumbh. With the oncoming of the Modi administration, the group started to become more active in Punjab again under the purview of Mohan Bhagwat. However, it remains opposed by Sikh hardliners. In 2017, the group organized an event on 25 October 2017 at Talkatora Stadium, New Delhi to commemorate the 350th birth anniversary of Guru Gobind Singh, which was attended by the Namdharis, Nirankaris, and Nirmalas. The programme included seminars on Guru Gobind Singh. The group did not install the Guru Granth Sahib at the event out of respect since it took place in a sporting stadium. However, the Jathedar of the Takht Patna Sahib, Iqbal Singh, was not present and the Shiromani Akali Dal, Shiromani Gurdwara Parbandhak Committee, and Dal Khalsa shunned the event. During the 2020–21 Indian farmers' protest, the RSS and its affiliates criticized actions of Sikh protesters as being part of a Khalistani or Naxalite agenda and them being vidharmi ("heretics"). After the Indian farmers' protests, the anti-Hindutva pushback in Punjab was strengthened due to anti-authoritarian and corporate sentiments. In early August 2020, the group held an akhand path at Gurdwara Brahm Kund, Ayodhya to mark the inauguration of the Ram Mandir in Ayodhya.

== Controversies ==
Sikh groups have resisted Hindutva in Punjab. RSS chief M. S. Golwalkar viewed the Sikhs as "communalists" who were "tearing asunder". Tensions between the RSS and Sikhs remained dormant until RSS chief K. S. Sudarshan opened a front in Punjab in 2000, with him stating the following in an address to the Rashtriya Sikh Sangat:

At the appropriate time, we will form Akhand Bharat [United India]. We have to regain the areas which we lost in 1947. We have to regain Lahore—the Capital of Maharaja Ranjit Singh’s Khalsa Raj. We have to reclaim Nankana Sahib and several other religious places, as also Sindhu [Indus] and Kasoor. The feeling for ‘Akhand Bharat’ has to survive because it is akin to the feeling that led to the unification of Germany, Vietnam and Poland [sic]. Partition of India was wrong.

— K. S. Sudarshan, Chandigarh address, 29 April 2000

Sudarshan asserted that Sikhs were not a dharma but rather a panth or sampradaya of Hinduism. After Sudarshan's controversial speech in 2000, there were protests by Sikh organizations, which sought a ban on the RSS in the state. The Shiromani Akali Dal criticized the RSS for attempting to "to infiltrate into Sikh religion" while Kanwarpal Singh of the Dal Khalsa called the Rashtriya Sikh Sangat "a bastard child of the RSS".

The group is opposed in Punjab by hardline Sikh and Khalistani groups, especially in border areas, mainly over the question regarding if Sikhs are a branch of Hinduism or an entirely independent religion. The group has been criticized for promoting a Brahminical form of Sikhism, and reducing the Sikh gurus' legacies to being nationalist figures. Sikh leadership views the group as a proxy of the RSS to expand its influence amongst the Sikhs and to promote the view that Sikhism is a shakti kendra of Hinduism and the "sword arm of Hindu religion". The group has rejected the notion that it is trying to absorb Sikhism into Hinduism. The group stated that a 2001 meeting between vice-chairman of the National Commission for Minorities Trilochan Singh and Madhav Govind Vaidya of the RSS cleared the issue.

The Akal Takht issued a Hukamnama (order) to the Sikh community in 2004 to not lend support to this organisation as it does not represent Sikh interests. The edict stands, even now. Giani Gurbachan Singh stated the following regarding the group:

No one can be allowed to distort Sikh history, and this kind of act cannot be tolerated. Sikhs are a separate qaum (ethnic group), and they have a distinct identity and a unique history. When they don’t interfere in the rituals, beliefs and code of ethics of any other religion, how can they tolerate interference from others in their own?

— Giani Gurbachan Singh, Jathedar of the Akal Takht (October 2017)

In 2004, the leader of the Akal Takht declared that the organisation to be "anti-Sikh" and "anti-panthic". It forbade all Sikhs from having any association with it. In 2009, the leader of the group, Rulda Singh, was murdered by Sikh extremists. In 2016, Sikh politician Rajdev Singh (who had joined in 2015 to repair ties between mainstream Sikhs and the RSS) resigned from his position within the group and stated that it was "very dangerous to the Sikh Panth". In 2017, the Akal Takht asked Sikhs to boycott a planned event in Delhi by the group to mark the 350th birth anniversary of Guru Gobind Singh. In 2018, the group supported Haryana Chief Minister M. L. Khattar after he cancelled a visit to a gurdwara who refused to take down a portrait of Jarnail Singh Bhindranwale. Also in 2018, it was alleged by Sikhs that books belonging to the Bharat Bharati series containing "blasphemous" content regarding the Sikh gurus were distributed. The Akal Takht, (the supreme temporal body of the Sikh community worldwide), specifically its Jathedar Giani Harpreet Singh, reiterated the ban again in October 2019 and sees the organisation as an attempt by the Rashtriya Swayamsevak Sangh (RSS) to promote Hindutva to Sikhs, and an attempt to assimilate (absorb) Sikhs into Hinduism, due to Mohan Bhagwat making a claim that "all Bharatiyas are Hindus".

Hindu nationalism in Punjab has been accompanied by a reinterpretation of Sikh history. The RSS has made a historical claim (of questionable authenticity) that in 1858, a FIR states that Nihang Sikhs (specifically one named Faqir Khasa) were part of the Ram Mandir movement in Ayodhya at the former Babri Masjid:

Nihang Sikhs entered the disputed structure [Babri Masjid] with flags and performed havan there … also raised Sri Ram Slogans there in the complex and there were more than 25 Sikhs who also wrote 'Ram-Ram' with charcoal on its walls.

— Suresh Bhaiyyaji Joshi, address at a Dalit Sikh colony in Jammu

Other historical claims by the RSS have been made regarding the Sikh gurus, such as Guru Nanak and Babur and Guru Tegh Bahadur and the nature of his execution. As per Moliner, Hindutva portrays Sikhs as "protectors of Hindus" but Sikhs who resist assimilation are characterized as "enemies of the nation" (anti-nationals) or associated with Khalistani separatism.

== Leadership ==
The Presidents of the organization are as follows:

No.	President	Term at office
1	Shamsher Singh	24 November 1986 – 16 September 1990
2	Chiranjeev Singh	1990–2002
3	Gurcharan Singh Gill	2002 – ?
4	Rulda Singh	?–2009
–	Gurcharan Singh Gill	2009 – present

Aside from the President, other positions in the organization include a General Secretary, Senior Pracharak, Mukhya Samrakshak, and Kshetriya Sanghathan Mantri.

== Conferences ==
The organization has hosted a number of conferences (known as the Rashtriya Adhivation), listed as follows:

1. First All-India Conference, hosted at Nagpur on 17 March 1987 under the purview of Jaimal Singh Lamba. The constitution of the group was adopted.
2. Second All-India Conference, hosted at Sri Hazur Sahib, Nanded in 1988 with Jivan Singh Umranangal as chief-guest.
3. Third All-India Conference, hosted at Patna Sahib in 1990 with Jathedar of Sri Patna Sahib, Giani Iqbal Singh, as chief-guest.
4. Fourth All-India Conference, hosted in Delhi in April 1992 under the purview of Harcharan Singh Balli with Giani Zail Singh as chief-guest.
5. Fifth All-India Conference, hosted in Jaipur in 1995 with Bhairon Singh Shekhawat as chief-guest.
6. Sixth All-India Conference, hosted in Delhi in 1998, plans were made for a yatra to commemorate the Khalsa tercentenary the following year.
7. Seventh All-India Conference, hosted in Kanpur between 12–14 October 2002

== See also ==
- Sangh Parivar
- Bharatiya Janata Party
- Rashtriya Swayamsevak Sangh (RSS)
- Muslim Rashtriya Manch
- Keshdhari Hindus
- Sanatan Sikh
- Hinduism and Sikhism
