= Paramjit Singh Pamma =

Khalistani activist from Punjab, India

Paramjit Singh "Pamma" is a Khalistani activist and alleged militant from the state of Punjab, India. He is a member of the Khalistan Tiger Force and is on the NIA Most Wanted list.

== Early life ==
Pamma a resident of SAS Nagar district, Punjab was allegedly engaged in low level crimes until 1992. He left India in 1994 and visited Pakistan and started fundraising for the Babbar Khalsa International, a Khalistani organisation.

Pamma was initially, close to Wadhawa Singh chief of Babbar Khalsa. Later on, Pamma joined the Khalistan Tiger Force and became closer to its chief Jagtar Singh Tara. Pamma then took charge of the militant-related activities in Thailand. He also provided support and infrastructure to militants from Punjab in South-East Asia.

Pamma had taken political asylum in United Kingdom in the year 2000 and lived in UK with his family.

== Alleged crimes committed ==
- Patiala and Ambala bomb explosions in Punjab, India.
- Head of Rashtriya Sikh Sangat, Rulda Singh’s killing in 2009.

== Extradition ==
Pamma received political asylum in the United Kingdom in September 2000 on the grounds of potential mistreatment by Indian authorities, whom he claimed had previously tortured him for his political views. He has since lived in the UK with his family.

In 2009, Punjab police announced they wanted Pamma for supposedly masterminding the murder of Rulda Singh, head of Rashtriya Sikh Sangat, while still in the United Kingdom.

In 2010, Pamma was also accused in connection with the Patiala and Ambala bomb explosions in Punjab, India.

In 2011, the UK authorities found evidence lacking after a joint investigation with Indian authorities and he was allowed to remain in the UK.

Interpol issued a Red Corner notice for the arrest of Pamma in 2012 after a request from the Indian authorities.

On 18 December 2015, while on a family holiday in Portugal, Pamma was detained by the Portuguese Police acting upon the Interpol notice. The arrest was opposed by many UK members of Parliament including, leader of the opposition, Jeremy Corbyn. Philip Hammond, serving Foreign Secretary, told the UK parliament he was effectively powerless in the proceedings in Portuguese courts. He was released on 12 February 2016, following representation from Francisca van Dunem, the Portuguese Minister for Justice.

Interpol removed Pamma's arrest warrant from its files in June 2016, stating "the data registered in Interpol’s files concerning Mr. Singh was not in compliance with Interpol’s rules".

== Affiliations ==
- Babbar Khalsa International
- Khalistan Tiger Force
