= Keshdhari Hindus =

Controversial Hindutva term for Sikhs

Keshdhari Hindus (meaning "Hindus with long hairs") is a term used and promoted by the advocates of Hindutva in the Rashtriya Swayamsevak Sangh, Vishva Hindu Parishad, and other Sangh Parivar organisations, describing Sikhs as the sword arm of Hindus and, hence, supposedly staunch Indian nationalists. The label is largely rejected by Sikhs.

== Usage ==
Many Hindus and Hindutva groups regard Sikhs as "turbaned Hindus", a label which many Sikhs reject. The former mentioned groups also seek to co-opt Sikhs as part of their anti-Islam and anti-Christian agenda, both of which are labelled as foreign religions. Hindutva groups also push the idea of Sikhs being the "sword arm of Hinduism". The RSS chief has used the term to describe Sikhs. The term is also used for people who are from Hindu backgrounds originally but on the border of established Sikh and Hindu beliefs and practices, possibly identifying with both faiths simultaneously or converting from Hinduism to Sikhism. The RSS since at least 2001, which formerly stated that Sikhs were Hindus, later instead claimed that Sikhs are part of the "Hindu samaj" (described as a "commonwealth of many religions") despite being a distinct religion, a softening of a formerly hardline stance. RSS leaders, such as K. S. Sudarshan, have stated that Sikhs are a Hindu panth.

== Reaction ==
Kahn Singh Nabha wrote the work Ham Hindu Nahin Hain to reject the notion that Sikhs are Hindus. The Sikh leadership, such as the SGPC, rejects the categorisation of Sikhs as Keshdhari Hindus and claims that Sikhism is a unique religion with a unique message.

Sikh leader, Harchand Singh Longowal, made the following comment in-response to Khushwant Singh claiming that Sikhs are "bearded Hindus":

"How can you say that Sikhs and Hindus are the same people? You say Sikhs are Keshdhari (sporting long hair) Hindus. Why don't you call the Muslims Sunnatdhari (circumcised) Hindus? After all, at some point of time, in history they must have been Hindus."

— Harchand Singh Longowal

In 2007, the SGPC rejected a classification scheme devised by the RSS, which described Sikhs as a "separate religion but part of the larger Hindu samaj", with SGPC president Avtar Singh Makkar denying Sikhs were part of the "Hindu samaj", with him asserting that Sikhs believe "only in Guru Granth Sahib and are ordered by the highest Sikh temporal seat". When RSS leader Mohan Bhagwat stated that "all Indians are Hindus" in 2023, the SGPC president Harjinder Singh Dhami replied:

The Sikhs are sui generis, a distinct entity, have their own unique character, and no one can amalgamate the same. India does not belong to any one religion. The Sikhs always stand for the country according to the traditions of their faith. The contribution of Sikhs in every crisis cannot be underestimated. I advise the RSS chief to refrain from making controversial statements[.]

— Harjinder Singh Dhami, 2023

== See also ==
- Sects of Sikhism
- Sanatan Sikh
- Rashtriya Sikh Sangat
- Hinduism and Sikhism
- Judeo-Christian
