= Rashtra =

Rashtra is the word for "nation" in Sanskrit. Rashtriya is the adjectival form for Rashtra.

== Rashtra ==
- Gopa Rashtra, a kingdom in ancient India
- Hindu Rashtra (disambiguation)
- Rashtra Sevika Samiti, an Indian women volunteer organization, affiliated with the Rashtriya Swayamsevak Sangh
- Pakistaner Rashtra Bhasha: Bangla Na Urdu?, 1947 book by Bengali Language Movement activist Abul Kashem

== Rashtriya ==
- National Assembly (Nepal) or Rastriya Sabha
- Rashtriya Swayamsevak Sangh, Indian Hindu-nationalist organisation
- Rashtriya Sikh Sangat, Indian Sikh organization, affiliated with the Rashtriya Swayamsevak Sangh
- Rashtriya Ispat Nigam, Indian steel company
- Muslim Rashtriya Manch, Indian Muslim organization, affiliated with the Rashtriya Swayamsevak Sangh
