= Our Hindu Rashtra =

Book authored by Aakar Patel

Our Hindu Rashtra: What It Is. How We Got Here
- Front cover
- Author: Aakar Patel
- Publisher: Westland Books
- Publication date: 2020
- Pages: 360

Our Hindu Rashtra (transl. "Our Hindu Nation") is a book about Hindu majoritarianism in India by journalist Aakar Patel, published by Westland Books in 2020. (Note: Book reviews) It surveys historical documents, government committee reports, court judgments, media archives, and records personal anecdotes on a range of issues. It argues that India is today a Hindu state in practice, and that the erosion of secularism in India began soon after India became independent, although the process accelerated after the election of Narendra Modi as Prime Minister in 2014.

== Content ==
Our Hindu Rashtra draws from a variety of material, including legal documents, historical documents, government reports, and personal anecdotes. The book is composed of 14 chapters. The first chapter explores the history of the partition of India, and a few others examine the foundational texts of Hindu nationalism and their influence on the contemporary ideology of the Bharatiya Janata Party (BJP). The second and third chapters examine religious majoritarianism in Pakistan and the marginalization of religious minorities in that country. The sixth chapter documents the marginalization of Muslims in India; the seventh, the debates in the Indian constitutional assembly about religious conversion.

Later chapters examine the spread of Hindu majoritarian ideology into the government and the legal system, including via the criminalization of cattle slaughter. One of the later chapters examines the marginalization of Muslims in Gujarat after the riots of 2002. Drawing on his experience as a journalist in Ahmedabad, Patel examines how the government has used laws such as the Disturbed Areas Act to separate and ghettoize Muslim populations.

The book argues that India is today a de facto Hindu Rashtra (transl. "Hindu nation"). Patel argues that the Hindu majoritarian ideology of the BJP lacks substance beyond its disdain of Muslims and Christians and its support of the caste system. Patel also posits that India began to move towards Hindu majoritarianism immediately after its independence, and that every government since has contributed to this process, although he adds that the process accelerated after the election of Narendra Modi as Prime Minister in 2014.

== Author ==
Aakar Patel is a journalist and columnist. He has been the chair of Amnesty International India. He is the author of Price of the Modi Years.

== Reception ==
A review of the book in the Economic and Political Weekly said it provided an honest analysis of "lurking majoritarianism in the Indian polity". The review praised Patel for his "courageous take down of patently unreasonable and biased court opinions", where Indian courts had compromised their commitment to secularism. It also praised the section on the history of partition, and called the analysis of the Sangh Parivar's foundational texts "brilliant". The review argues that Patel falls somewhat short in examining the "distinctive malevolance" of Hindu majoritarianism in the present moment.

Ranjona Banerji of The Asian Age in her review of the book writes, "Our Hindu Rashtra is more a presentation of our recent history from the perspective of democracy. It is also a warning and a reminder of where we are headed".

Samrat wrote in Firstpost that the book was "lucidly written", and that it encompassed considerable research despite not being overly long. The review recommended the book to readers to both Indians and Pakistanis "interested in understanding how their countries got to where they are." Samrat writes that the book's narrative may sadden those who oppose the marginalization of minorities, but states that it ends with a hopeful message.

== See also ==
- Hindutva and Hindu Rashtra
