= Mohsin Sheikh murder =

The Mohsin Sheikh murder was the lynching of Mohsin Shaikh in Pune on 2 June 2014. Communal tensions followed public awareness of derogatory photographs of Maratha king Shivaji and Shiv Sena founder Bal Thackeray uploaded to social media. Public buses were vandalized and arrests were made. The uploads were made through foreign proxy servers traced to sources in India. Home minister R R Patil said authorities know who uploaded the images and that Mohsin was innocent and died in the riots. The Government of Maharashtra announced compensation to his family. Before this, Nikhil Tikone of Kasba Peth was targeted by Hindus as a photo of him spread via whatsapp saying he was "Nihal Khan" during communal tensions. Muslims too attacked him believing that he was associated with RSS.

== Victim ==
Mohsin Mohammed Sadique Shaikh was an IT professional working as an IT manager for a private textile firm. He was attacked and killed while returning after prayer from Unnati Nagar. Police made arrests including the leader of Hindu Rashtra Sena (HRS), a Hindutva group, for their alleged role in the incident. In 2023, a court in Pune acquitted all members of Hindu Rashtra Sena accused of lynching of Mohsin Sheikh.

== Reaction ==
Dhananjay Jayram Desai, the founder president of Hindu Rashtra Sena (HRS) denied that his outfit had anything to do with the murder and said, "We understand that circulating derogatory pictures is a cyber crime but the problem cannot be solved by killing innocent persons.".

Rajya Sabha MP and Congress leader Hussain Dalwai on 1 July 2014 alleged that police officers investigating the Mohsin Shaikh murder case were trying to cover it up, and they should be dismissed. "The Chief Minister Prithviraj Chavan assured us that government will make the investigation into this unfortunate incident a priority. We were also told that the organisation behind this ghastly act and the people involved in spreading communal disharmony will be taught a lesson," he added.

== Acquittal ==
In March 2015 the Bombay high court denied bail to Desai, maintaining that the prosecution had rightly stated that Desai had instigated the unrest to satisfy his vendetta against a community. The judge noted most of the rioters were young men. The High Court maintained that a witness' claim that a plan had been hatched to attack members of a community as directed by Desai was sufficient to deny bail. Desai was granted bail on 17 January 2019. He and all other accused in lynching of Sheikh were ultimately acquitted in 2023. He accused that government falsely arrested him because of political vendetta against him.
