= Aakar Patel =

Indian activist and author

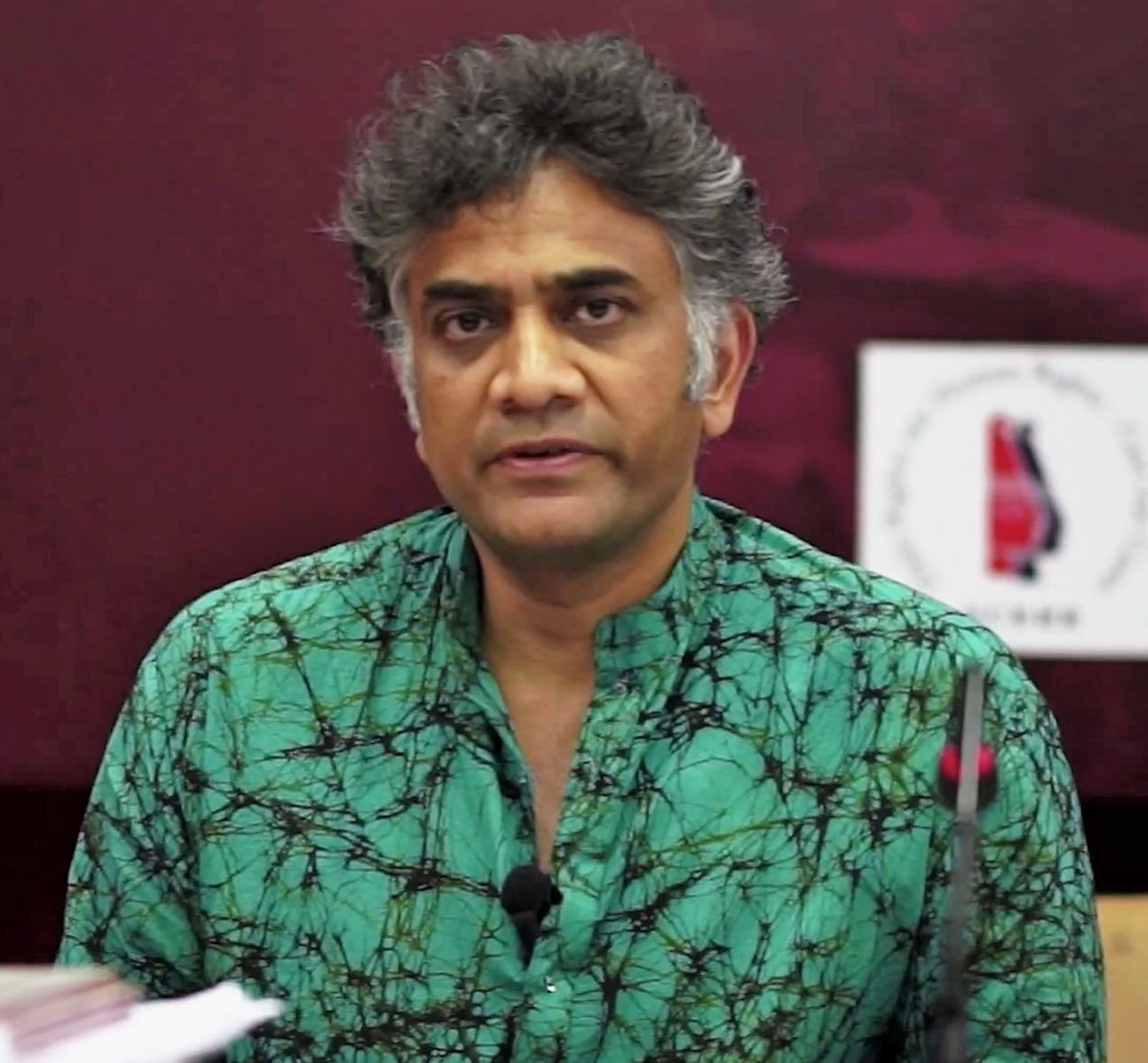
- Patel at a 2016 event
- Occupation: Writer
- Writing career
- Language: English
- Genre: Politics
- Notable works: Our Hindu Rashtra; Price of the Modi Years

Aakar Patel is an Indian journalist, activist and author. He served as the head of Amnesty International in India between 2015 and 2019, and currently serves as the chair of the Board of Amnesty International in India. He is the author of Our Hindu Rashtra, an account of majoritarianism in India, and of Price of the Modi Years, which examines the administrative performance of Indian Prime Minister Narendra Modi. In 2014, he authored a translation of Saadat Hasan Manto's Urdu non-fiction Why I Write.

== Early life ==
Patel was born in a lower middle class Hindu family in Surat, Gujarat. He grew up in a conservative environment. He later moved to Mumbai in search of a job and started working. Subsequently, he returned to his native place to join for a short stint as the editor in chief of a Gujarati newspaper Divya Bhaskar.

Patel has worked with several Indian media organisations. He has worked in the newspaper, Deccan Chronicle as a Deputy Editor and thereafter at Dorling Kindersley. He had also worked at Mid Day Multimedia Ltd as Editor in Chief. He has authored articles for Mint Lounge.

== Activism ==
Patel co-authored a report on the 2002 Gujarat riots, titled 'Rights and Wrongs' . He is a human rights activist and had served as the executive director of Amnesty International India, heading its operations in India, between 2015 and 2019.

In 2022, a case was filed against Patel by a Bharatiya Janata Party politician (MLA) after which Patel's passport was impounded in Surat, Gujarat. After his petition, a Surat District and Sessions Court had granted Patel permission to use his own passport from March 1 to May 30 and visit the US.

In April 2022, he was invited by a group of American universities to speak in multiple conferences about the human rights situation in India. The conferences were organised by the University of Michigan, University of California, Berkeley and New York University. Patel was prevented from boarding a flight to USA, by the Indian government authorities, who cited a pending case against Amnesty India related to Foreign Contribution Regulation Act (FCRA). He accused Modi government of doing this in retaliation for his critical book Price of the Modi Years. Patel called the book as the reason he was being prevented from speaking at lectures abroad. Patel said on Twitter, "Price of the Modi years was published in November 2021. The following month the LOC (Lookout Circular) was opened".

He sued the CBI in a Delhi court against the travel ban and asked the court to compensate him for the loss of the cost of flight ticket. Patel, through his lawyer argued that the travel ban imposed on him was in violation of his fundamental rights under Articles 19 and 21, in addition the move by the investigating officer to open the lookout circular was "a blatant violation of court, procedure, ethics, morality and legal obligation as a public officer and a police officer". He petitioned that the lost amount be charged to the Investigative Officer and donated to a charity. He also sought permission from the court to travel to the USA till 30 May 2022. Reacting to the incident Amnesty International has called for an "immediate revocation" of the "arbitrary travel ban" on Patel.

On 7 April 2022, the Delhi court decided the petition in favour of Patel and ordered the Central Bureau of Investigation (CBI) to immediately withdraw the Look Out Circular that was issued against Patel. The court also asked the CBI Director to apologise to Patel, acknowledging the lapses on part of his subordinate. The court noted, "In this case, a written apology from the head of CBI acknowledging lapse on part of his subordinate to the applicant would go a long way in not only healing wounds of the applicant but also upholding trust and confidence of the public in the premier institution". According to the Court, issuing the Look Out Circular "merely on the basis of apprehensions arising out of whims and fancies of the investigating agency" was inappropriate. The court asked the CBI Director to fix accountability and sensitize the officials who had issued the circular. The court asked Patel to approach relevant authorities to seek the financial compensation. The judge also asked CBI to submit a compliance report by 4 PM of the following day. The CBI refused to comply with the court order and Patel was stopped at the airport a second time. A CBI special court put on hold the 7 April 2022 order by Delhi court. Patel filed a contempt of the court plea against the CBI. Following this a revision petition was filed and a Delhi court stayed the orders directing CBI to withdraw the lookout notice against Patel until the revision petition was decided.

Patel was a member of the jury for a People's Union for Civil Liberties independent tribunal that investigated the causes and impact of the 2023–2025 Manipur violence and published a report on its findings in August 2025.

== Views ==
On 8 July 2023, Patel said that in India there is discrimination against Muslims that is permitted through law. He said Muslims are the only communities for whom divorce has been criminalized. He pointed out, “After 2018, marriages between Hindus and Muslims were criminalized too in eight States ruled by the BJP..." He further added, “There is no Muslim Cabinet Minister for the first time in the history of India. There is no Muslim Chief Minister anywhere in India. The BJP has around 1,000 MLAs across States, none of them is a Muslim. The idea is that there should be friction between communities for the democracy to work,” he said.

== Works ==
- In 2014, he authored a translation of Saadat Hasan Manto's Urdu non-fiction Why I Write.

Our Hindu Rashtra
The book, Our Hindu Rashtra (transl. "Our Hindu Nation") about Hindu majoritarianism in India was authored by Aakar Patel, and published by Westland Books in the year 2020. (Note: Book reviews) It surveys historical documents, government committee reports, court judgments, media archives, and records personal anecdotes on a range of issues. It argues that India is today a Hindu state in practice, and that the erosion of secularism in India began soon after India became independent, although the process accelerated after the election of Narendra Modi as Prime Minister in 2014.

Price of the Modi Years
The book, Price of the Modi Years was authored by Patel, and published by Westland Books in the year 2021. The book details the history of India since 2014 when Narendra Modi became the Prime Minister. The book examines the potential human and economic price that India will be paying for the decisions made in the seven years spent under the Modi administration since 2014. The book uses statistics and describes the damage to India by the BJP government.
