= Ram Rajya =

Ram Rajya can refer to:

- Reign of Rama in Ayodhya, as mentioned in the ancient Indian epic Ramayana
  - Utopian rule, as mentioned in the writings of Mahatma Gandhi
  - Hindu Rashtra (lit. 'Hindu Nation'), as propagated by adherents of Hindutva
    - Ram Rajya Parishad, an Indian political party

== Films ==
- Ram Rajya (1943 film), a 1943 Indian film
- Ram Rajya (1967 film), a 1967 Indian film
- Ramrajya (2022 film), a 2022 Indian film
- Sri Rama Rajyam, a 2011 Indian film
- Ramarajyamlo Bheemaraju, 1983 Indian film
- Ramarajyadalli Rakshasaru, 1990 Indian film

== See also ==
- Hindu Rashtra (disambiguation)
