= Amnesty International India =

Indian unit of Amnesty International

- Founded: 1966, India
- Type: NGO
- Location: Bangalore, India
- Key people: Avinash Kumar (Executive Director)
- Website: amnesty.org.in

Amnesty International India was a country unit of the Amnesty International network, and was part of a global movement promoting and defending human rights and dignity. Amnesty International halted its operational and campaign work inside India in September 2020 after the Indian government froze its bank accounts, in connection with its money laundering probe into the finances of Amnesty International and its related entities. The organization called this unfair while the government of India said the case is based on a FIR filed by CBI (Central Bureau of Investigation) against Amnesty for alleged violation of the Foreign Contributions Regulatory Act

== History ==
=== Rights ===
An Amnesty International office was first set up in India in Bihar in 1966. Since then, the organization has worked on cases related torture, prisoners of conscience, abusive laws, women's rights, corporate accountability and other human rights violations.

On 13 August 2016, Amnesty held an event in Bengaluru to discuss human rights violations in Kashmir, After the event, the Akhil Bharatiya Vidyarthi Parishad filed a first information report (FIR) against Amnesty India for being anti-national. Amnesty India denied that the organization or its staff had been involved in any anti-national activities. Sedition charges were pressed against Amnesty, but were dropped later on.

=== CBI raid & foreign funding ===
On 15 November 2019 the Central Bureau of Investigation raided the offices of Amnesty International India in Bengaluru and New Delhi during an investigation into an alleged breach of foreign funding laws. In a statement issued by CBI, they said "It was alleged that the provision of the Foreign Contribution (Regulation) Act 2010 and Indian Penal Code were contravened". Aakar Patel was the chief of Amnesty in 2019.

In 2020, Amnesty said that "reprisals" from the Indian government froze the organization's bank account, forcing it to lay off staff, suspend all campaign and research work, and otherwise halt operations in India. The Ministry of Home Affairs said that Amnesty violated the Foreign Contribution Regulation Act (FCRA) as "a significant amount of foreign money was also remitted to Amnesty (India) without MHA’s approval under FCRA" and "owing to these illegal practices of Amnesty, the previous government had also rejected the repeated applications of Amnesty to receive funds from overseas. This had led Amnesty to suspend its India operations once during that period as well."

On 16 February 2021, the Enforcement Directorate attached properties worth ₹17.66 crore (about $2.4 million, at that time) of the organisation in connection with an alleged violation of the Foreign Contribution Regulation Act (FCRA).

== Campaigns ==
Amnesty International India collaborates with Railway Protection Force, Western Railways in Mumbai to ensure female passengers’ right to safety. It also ran a campaign to reduce the number of under-trials in jails in India. Some of Amnesty India's campaigns include seeking justice for the victims in the 1984 anti-Sikh riots as well as opposing the use of the death penalty in India.
