= Rulda Singh =

Indian politician

President of Rashtriya Sikh Sangat
- In office unknown – 14 August 2009
- Succeeded by: Gurcharan Singh Gill

General Secretary of BJP NRI wing
- In office unknown – 14 August 2009

Personal details
- Born: Rulda Singh Kharoud; 9 April 1952 Jasowal, Punjab, India
- Died: 14 August 2009 (aged 57) Chandigarh, India
- Cause of death: Gunshot wounds
- Party: Bharatiya Janata Party (unknown–2009)

Rulda Singh Kharoud (born 9 April 1952 – 14 August 2009) was an Indian politician. He was president of Rashtriya Sikh Sangat. He was also general secretary of NRI wing of Bharatiya Janata Party. In July 2009, Singh was shot by two or three armed assailants outside his residence, and died weeks later to his wounds.

== Personal life ==
Singh was born in Jat Sikh family on 9 April 1952 to father Babu Singh in Jasowal, a village near Patiala, Punjab, India. He was eldest among seven siblings. He was married to Surjit Kaur. As of 2006, Singh resided near Sirhind road in Patiala district. Due to his close proximity with BJP & leaders from several Hindu religious organisations, he was very committed to play the role in bridging the gap between Hindu & Sikh community in Punjab as well as other Indian states, which had lately been affected during post-Bluestar years. Representing Sikh community, he was sworn in as National president of RSS's Sikh off-shoot Rashtriya Sikh Sangat, formed primarily to promote nationalism & harmony amongst Sikh youth who were disgruntled with Congress's divisive politics, which included 1984 Sikh riots & subsequent, militancy in Punjab in late 1980s and early 1990s.

== Death ==
On 29 July 2009, Rulda Singh was shot several times in the face and abdomen by two to three armed assailants. Weeks later he died at PGIMER, Chandigarh. In July 2010, three UK Sikhs were arrested following an 11-month investigation.
