= Dalit Sikh =

Dalit Sikh may refer to the following communities:

- Mazhabis/Rangretas, who originate from the Chuhra caste
- Ramdasias/Ravidassias, who originate from the Chamar caste
