= Price of the Modi Years =

Book authored by Aakar Patel

- Book cover
- Author: Aakar Patel
- Publisher: Westland Books
- Publication date: 2021
- Pages: 496
- ISBN: 9391234224

Price of the Modi Years is a book authored by Aakar Patel, published by Westland Publications Limited (Westland Books) in 2021. The book details the history of India since 2014 when Narendra Modi became the Prime Minister. It examines the potential human and economic price that it claims India will be paying for the decisions made in the seven years spent under the BJP government since 2014.

== Cover ==
The cover art of the book includes 16 charts of India's performance measured by international indices. There is a downward trend in all but one of the indices looked at by the author, including those for democracy, human development index, individual rights, rule of law, press freedom, women's safety, prosperity, civil liberties, corruption and social cohesion. The only upward trend in those indices is seen in the Doing Business Index of the World Bank, an index that the World Bank abandoned in 2021. Journalist Jawed Naqvi praised the cover as "clever".

== Content ==
The book examines the potential human and economic price that it claims India will be paying for the decisions made in the seven years spent under the Modi administration since 2014. The author used statistics to describe the damage to India under the BJP government.

The book presents several metrics of performance evaluation of the government—indices, such as the United Nations Development Program Human Development Index, Lowy Institute Asia Power Index, Brand Finance Global Soft Power Index, Freedom House’s Freedom in the World, Reporters Without Borders’ World Press Freedom Index and others. India had performed badly in 57 out 58 of these indicators. The author notes, "Seen over the years of his two terms, the man in full is revealed, and so is his effect on the nation."

The book discussed the government's handling of dissenter and critics. In the first six months of 2020, the book noted Modi government to have made 2,772 legal demands to censor contents and accounts on Twitter, and it cites incidents such as the raids by government agencies against the news sites NewsClick and Newslaundry, and arrests of activists during the COVID-19 pandemic in India.

Discussing the swift decision making practice of Narendra Modi, the book discussed the 2016 Indian banknote demonetisation in which the cash-centric Indian economy was rendered cashless overnight. During the Covid pandemic, India was given only four hours notice before a nationwide lockdown. Later the government claimed, in court, that no deaths were caused due to the lack of oxygen during the pandemic.

After the "Make in India" programme was launched by Modi, the share of manufacturing in the Indian GDP has reduced from 16% to 13%. Employment in the manufacturing sector has reduced to half after 2016, from 5.1 crore to 2.7 crore. The author has claimed that the former economic adviser Arvind Panagariya said that 'Aatmanirbhar Bharat is muddled'. The author also states that the programme's biggest achievements were more expensive goods for Indian consumers and protection from external competition for big industrialists.

Discussing the labour force participation, the author quotes government data and points out that the participation in USA is 60%, in China 70%, while it was only 40% in India, even lower than Pakistan and, for the first time, lowest in South Asia. India lost a fifth of its workforce that the author credits to the 'staggering incompetence' of Prime Minister Narendra Modi.

The author said that India will be negatively impacted by the Modi years, primarily on its economy and society and that India is no longer progressing to become a developed nation or have the same development potential that was produced by China. According to Patel, under the Modi government the economic trajectory will lead to the continuation of mass poverty, and mass unemployment will become the norm. Patel stated that the majority of national resources and wealth will be controlled by a few, the way it has been happening in past few years along with Indian society remaining divided with the minorities forced to ghettoise. Patel believes that Indians will be focused on religion and religious differences, and violence will be accepted. When it comes to the use of force, Patel thinks that it has been devolved from the state with encouragement by Hindutva and that the mob rule by Hindutva will continue in the foreseeable future.

The book lists 19 existing schemes that were launched by the previous Prime Minister Manmohan Singh but were renamed by Modi's government. The book commented on Modi's apparent love for acronyms and gave examples of 115 acronyms that were created with an intention of promotion.

In international politics, the book discusses the deterioration of India's relations with its neighbors China and Pakistan, and India's handling of the dispute about Kashmir.

In its conclusion, the book notes that "Modi's popularity does not come from his performance".

== Reception ==
Writing for The Economic Times, Swaminathan Aiyar noted how the book was backed by "considerable research", and thus had "more credibility than other rhetorical denunciations of BJP rule", and that the book did a good job in "exposing the crash in India’s international stature". However, he also commented that the book "mixes actuality with amnesia", that the author cherry-picked the beginning and end dates while comparing indices, and that he may also have left out some indices showing India in a better light, that the author ignores soaring achievements in renewable energy and startups, and that the data on production of automobiles shows more of a blip than a stagnation.

Business Standard called the book "a laborious compendium" and a "useful guide" to Modi's track record.

Journalist Jawed Naqvi in his review for Dawn called the book an "exceptional work" in exposing the performance of the Modi administration. The book "is an archival work with detailed notes and cross-referenced accounts of the prime minister’s shortcomings against core challenges." He called the book a "survey of PM Modi’s resounding incompetence and undiscussed failures on key fronts, juxtaposed with a divisive and potentially doomed project called Hindu rashtra."

Khaled Ahmed, in his book review for Newsweek Pakistan wrote that the book "has emerged as the most comprehensive and reliable account of the time Indian Prime Minister Narendra Modi has spent in power. Written by Aakar Patel, a syndicated columnist who has edited both English and Gujarati newspapers, it details the history of India since 2014."

Web portal, Moneycontrol in their review, called the book, "a 488 page report card" of Narendra Modi's tenure as the Prime Minister.
