= Hinduism and Sikhism =

Relationship between the religions

Hinduism and Sikhism are Indian religions. Hinduism has pre-historic origins, while Sikhism was founded in the 15th century by Guru Nanak. Both religions share many philosophical concepts such as karma, dharma, mukti, and maya although both religions have different interpretations of some of these concepts.

== Links ==
=== Ideological ===
Some historians, like Louis Fenech, view Sikhism as an extension of the Bhakti movement. Fenech states, "Indic mythology permeates the Sikh sacred canon, the Guru Granth Sahib and the secondary canon, the Dasam Granth and adds delicate nuance and substance to the sacred symbolic universe of the Sikhs of today and of their past ancestors". The Sikh scriptures use Hindu terminology, with references to the Vedas, and the names of gods and goddesses in Hindu bhakti movement traditions, such as Vishnu, Shiva, Brahma, Parvati, Lakshmi, Saraswati, Rama, Krishna, but not to worship. Sukhmani Sahib refers to God by names such as Paarbrahm, Antarjaami, Hari and Prabhu.

Some historians do not see evidence of Sikhism as simply an extension of the Bhakti movement. While the Guru Granth Sahib acknowledges the Vedas, Puranas and Qur'an, it does not imply a syncretic bridge between Hinduism and Islam, but emphasises focusing on Nitnem banis like Japji, instead of Muslim practices such as circumcision or praying by prostrating on the ground to God, or Hindu rituals such as wearing thread. It refers to the spiritual concepts in Hinduism (Ishvara, Bhagavan, Brahman) and the concept of God in Islam (Allah) to assert that these are just "alternate names for the Almighty One".

=== Struggle against Mughals ===
During the Mughal Empire period, both the Sikh and Hindu traditions believe that Sikhs helped protect Hindus from Islamic persecution, and this caused martyrdom of their Guru. The Sikh historians, for example, record that the Sikh movement was rapidly growing in northwest India, and Guru Tegh Bahadur was openly encouraging Sikhs to, "be fearless in their pursuit of just society: he who holds none in fear, nor is afraid of anyone, is acknowledged as a man of true wisdom", a statement recorded in Adi Granth 1427. While Guru Tegh Bahadur influence was rising, Aurangzeb had imposed Islamic laws, demolished Hindu schools and temples, and enforced new taxes on non-Muslims.

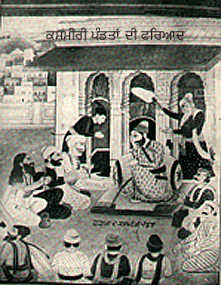
Painting of Kashmiri Pandits petitioning Guru Tegh Bahadur for help against persecution of Hindus in Kashmir by the Mughal Empire, circa 19th century

According to records written by his son Guru Gobind Singh, the Guru had resisted persecution, adopted and promised to protect Kashmiri Hindus. The Guru was summoned to Delhi by Aurangzeb on a pretext, but when he arrived with his companions, he was offered, "to abandon his faith, and convert to Islam", but after refusing the demand of the Mughal emperor, Guru Tegh Bahadur and his companions were arrested and tortured for many weeks. The Guru himself was beheaded in public.

== Beliefs ==
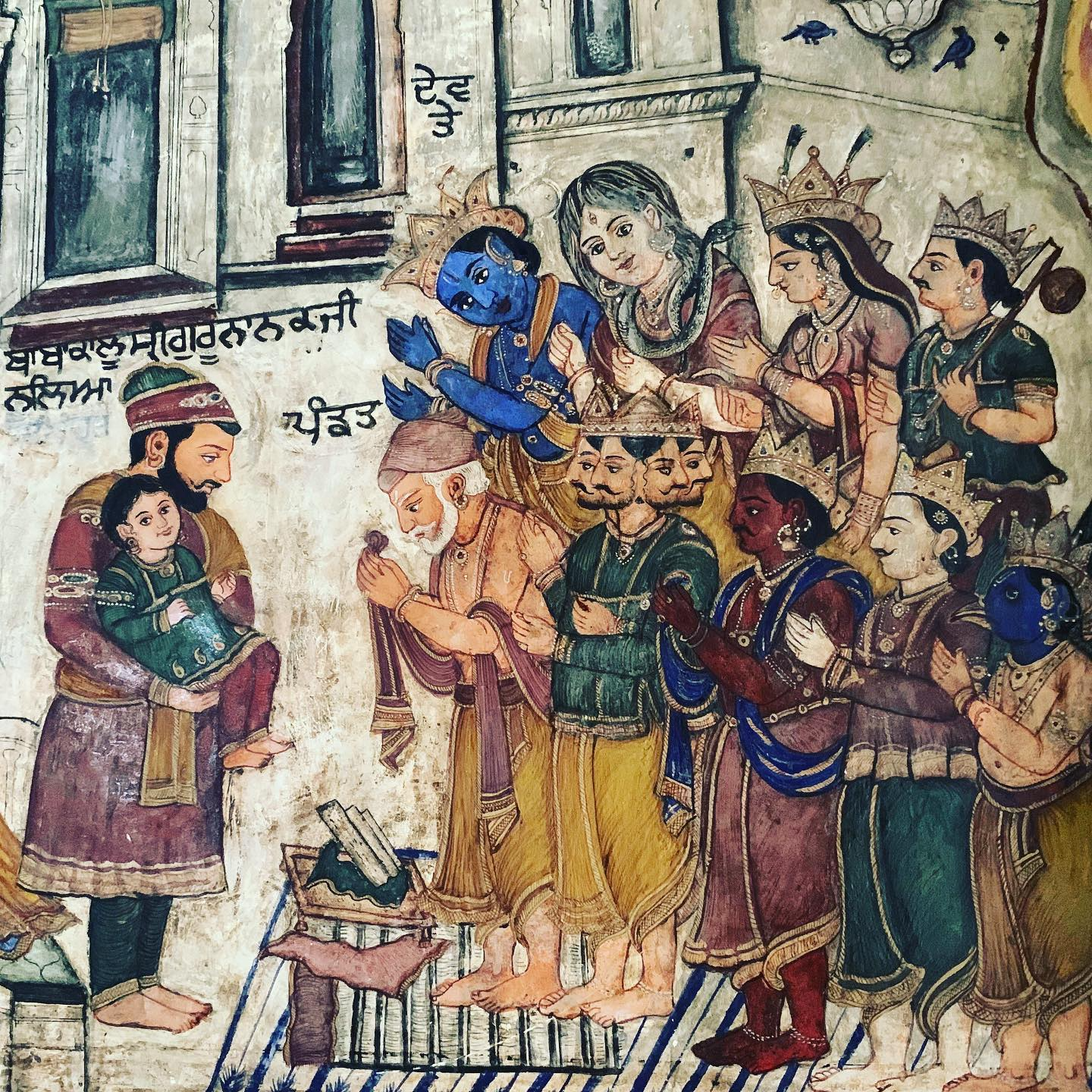
Sikh depiction of Nanak being greeted by various Indic deities

=== Concept of God ===
The oneness of God is at the core of Hinduism but it has some panentheistic and henotheistic tendencies. Scholars state all deities are typically viewed in Hinduism as "emanations or manifestation of genderless principle called Brahman, representing the many facets of Ultimate Reality".

The description of God in Sikhism is monotheistic and rejects the concept of divine incarnation as present in Hinduism.

Sukhmani Sahib describes God as Nirguna and Sargun as well in the following words:

niragun aap saragun bhee ohee || kalaa dhaar jin sagalee mohee || apane charit prabh aap banaae || . ||8||18||

He Himself is absolute and unrelated; He Himself is also involved and related. Manifesting His power, He fascinates the entire world. God Himself sets His play in motion.

=== Views on cattle ===
Hinduism specifically considers the zebu (Bos indicus) to be sacred.

Sikhs and Hindus traditionally held the cow as sacred due to their role in providing sustenance and haulage. According to Arvind-Pal Singh Mandair, many Sikhs refrain from eating beef as cows, oxen, and buffalo are a central part of the livelihood of rural Sikhs, with many Sikhs coming from agricultural-backgrounds. Thus, Sikhs generally respect cattle and do not slaughter them for food. Sikhs generally avoid eating beef because the cow & the buffalo have been integral part of rural Sikh livelihoods but do not go to the lengths of the Hindus by considering it to be sacred. Similarly, Sikhs avoid eating pork in the company of Muslims. However, there is no religious prohibition about eating beef and pork. Guru Amar Das condemned atrocities against Brahmins and cattle. According to W. Owen Cole and P. S. Sambhi, an aggregate of evidence tentatively suggests that the Guru refrained from censuring Hindu traditions in order to induct Hindu followers. Under Sikh rule, cow slaughter was punishable by death; the prohibition was maintained by even the British after the annexation of Punjab to placate Hindu-Sikh sentiments. During the 1860s, the Namdhari Sikhs opposed cattle-slaughter. According to a Khalsa Bahadur (Lahore) article dated to 5 September 1903, the Sikhs consider cattle to be a useful animal but do not go to the lengths of the Hindus by considering it to be sacred.

=== Idol worship ===
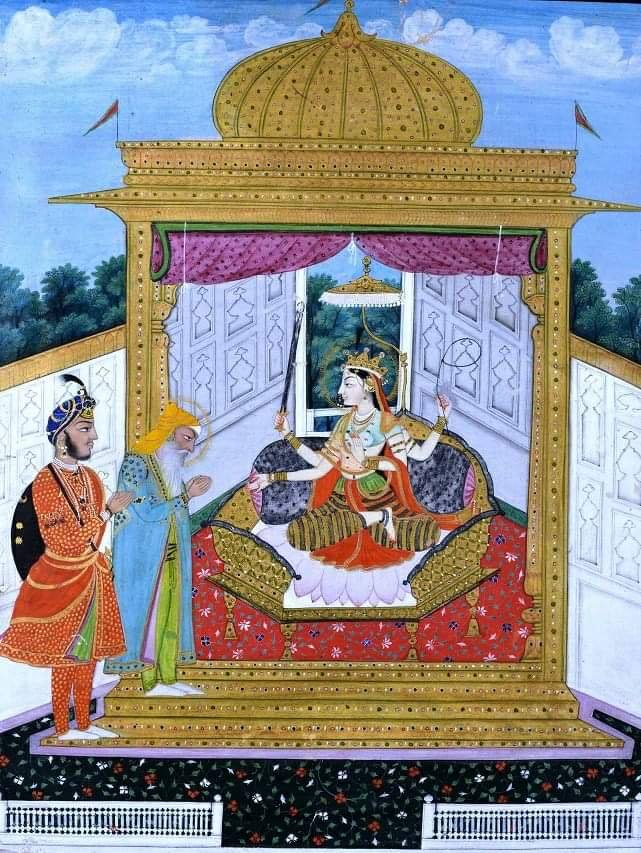
Maharaja Ranjit Singh pays homage to Durga

Hindus accept the worship facilitated with images or murtis (idols), particularly in Agamic traditions, such as Vaishnavism and Shaivism. Some scholars state it is incorrect to state that all Hindus worship idols and more correct to state that for some, the idol is a means to focus their thoughts, for some idols are a manifestation of spirituality that is everywhere, and for some, even a linga, a sunrise or a river or a flower serves the same purpose.

Sikhism prohibits idol worship, in accordance with mainstream Khalsa norms and the teachings of the Sikh Gurus, a position that has been accepted as orthodox. However, idol worship infiltrated many Sikh Gurdwaras during the 18th and 19th centuries under the administration of Udasi and Hindu mahants. In 1905, after re-establishing institutional control, the Khalsa managed to remove the idols installed during the preceding period, as well as ending mahant administration.

=== Heaven and Hell ===
According to Hinduism, the soul is sent to heaven or hell before it is sent back to a new reincarnation. The souls are reborn into another being as per their karma.

Sikhs believe that heaven and hell are also both in this world where everyone reaps the fruit of karma. They refer to good and evil stages of life respectively and can be lived now and here during our life on Earth.

=== Pilgrimage ===
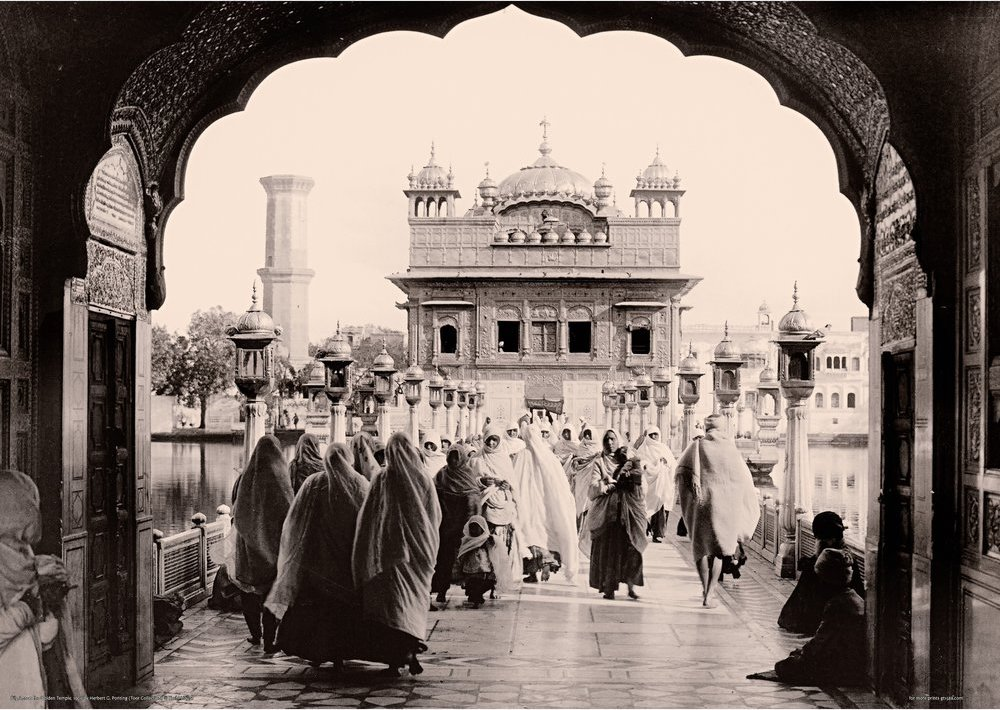
Photograph of Sikh pilgrims at the Golden Temple in Amritsar, circa January 1906

Hinduism considers pilgrimage as helpful for one's spiritual development. According to Karel Werner's Popular Dictionary of Hinduism, "most Hindu places of pilgrimage are associated with legendary events from the lives of various gods. Almost any place can become a focus for pilgrimage, but in most cases they are sacred cities, rivers, lakes, and mountains."

Sikhism does not overtly promote pilgrimage as a religious practice.

According to a study published by Madanjit Kaur, there exists documentary proof in the form of vahis (ledgers maintained by genealogists and priests at various places of pilgrimage) that Guru Tegh Bahadur, Guru Gobind Singh and his widows visited various Hindu tirthas, appointed their family purohits to those sites, and directed their followers to honor the appointed purohits.

=== Śrāddha ===
Hindus offer Śrāddha every year in memory of their ancestors. On the corresponding day, the descendants invite the Brahmin and feed them in memory of their parents and grandparents, in the belief that this will give some benefit to the soul of their dead ancestors.

According to Sikhism, such food can provide benefit to the Brahmins, but the benefit can't reach the ancestors. All that can provide benefit to the deceased is his own good actions and service to humanity. As per Sikh belief, it is much better to respect one's parents while alive than offering food to Brahmins after their death.

=== Auspicious days ===
According to certain shastras of Hinduism, some moments, days and lunar dates are regarded as auspicious. On all these days special rituals are observed. It is a common practice in Hinduism to perform or avoid activities like important religious ceremonies on the basis of the quality of a particular muhurta. One or more Muhūrtas are recommended by the Vedic scriptures when performing rituals and other ceremonies.

The Sikh Scripture, Guru Granth Sahib denounces belief in auspicious days. Sikh Gurus rejected the idea that certain days are auspicious while some others are not.

=== Fasting ===
Fasting is an important part of Hinduism and fasts are observed on many occasions. Fasts are an important aspect of Hindu ritual life, and there are many different types. In some cases, fasting simply means abstaining from certain types of foods, such as grains. Devotees fast for a variety of reasons. Some fast to honor a particular deity, and others fast to obtain a specific end.

Sikhism does not regard fasting as a spiritual act. Fasting as an austerity or as a mortification of the body by means of willful hunger is discouraged in Sikhism. Sikhism encourages temperance and moderation in food i.e. neither starve nor over-eat.

=== Caste system ===
There are four varnas within Hindu society. Within these varnas, there are also many jati. The first is the Brahmin (teacher or priest), the second is the Kshatriya (ruler or warrior), the third is the Vaishya (merchant or farmer) and the fourth is the Shudra (servant or labourer). People who are excluded from the four-fold varna system are considered untouchables and are called Dalit.

Guru Nanak preached against the caste system. Guru Gobind Singh introduced Singh for Sikh males to abolish caste-based prejudice. Although Sikh Gurus criticised the hierarchy of the caste system, one does exist in Sikh community. Some Sikh families continue to check the caste of any prospective marriage partner for their children. In addition, Sikhs of some castes tend to establish gurdwaras intended for their caste only. Members of the Ramgarhia caste, for example, identify their gurdwaras in this way (particularly those established in the United Kingdom), as do members of the Dalit caste.

=== Asceticism ===
Hinduism has exalted asceticism because of the belief that ascetics live the pure life of spiritual attainment. Sannyasa as a form of asceticism, is marked by renunciation of material desires and prejudices, represented by a state of disinterest and detachment from material life, and has the purpose of spending one's life in peaceful, love-inspired, simple spiritual life.

While Sikhism treats lust as a sin, it at the same time points out that man must share the moral responsibility by leading the life of a householder. According to Sikhism, being God-centred while being a householder is better than being an ascetic. According to Sikhism, ascetics are not on the right path.

=== Menstruation ===
Hindu traditions present varying opinions regarding menstruation. Tantric sects consider menstrual blood to be sacred and even incorporated it into certain rituals and practices. Several texts, including Agama literature as well as the Yogashikha Upanishad, believe that menstruation is a physical reflection of the divine feminine, the shakti (creative/cosmic energy) that allows the creation of life.

On the contrary, many strict Menstruation laws are expressed in the Manusmriti. Any touch of the menstruating woman was deemed polluted, and if she touches any food item, that was also considered forbidden. To lie down in the same bed as a menstruating woman was also not allowed. However, Manusmriti is only one among several other, approximated to be around 100, (Note: Pandurang Vaman Kane mentions over 100 different Dharmasastra texts which were known by the Middle Ages in India, but most of these are lost to history and their existence is inferred from quotes and citations in bhasya and digests that have survived. Currently, 18 major Dharmasastra texts are in existence.) Dharmaśāstra. These Hindu theological texts have differing views on the subject of Menstruation with some recognizing menstruation as a natural process. The Vedas, the primary and most sacred Hindu texts do not put any such restrictions around menstruation. Menstruation is a natural process and is seen as sacred as it gives life. Menstruating women in the Vedic period were relieved from their regular duties to rest and be served by their family members. They would use their free time to pray, meditate and pursue any pastimes of their choice.

Sikh scriptures acknowledge menstrual bleeding as an essential and natural process. Sikh Gurus criticized those who stigmatize a blood-stained garment as polluted. Guru Nanak questioned the legitimacy and purpose of devaluing women on the basis of their reproductive energy.

=== Animal sacrifice ===
The rituals of animal sacrifices are mentioned in some of the Hindu scriptures such as Vedas. Hindu texts dated to 1st millennium BC, initially mention meat as food, then evolve to suggestions that only meat obtained through ritual sacrifice can be eaten, thereafter evolving to the stance that one should eat no meat because it hurts animals, with verses describing the noble life as one that lives on flowers, roots and fruits alone. The late Vedic era literature (pre-500 BCE) condemns all killings of men, cattle, birds and horses, and prays to god Agni to punish those who kill.

Sikhism rejects the concept of sacrificing animals to appease God. Guru Gobind Singh prohibited consumption of any meat obtained through religious sacrifice of animals (Kutha meat). Some Nihangs and Hazoori Sikhs still do animal sacrifice.

=== Beliefs regarding eclipse ===
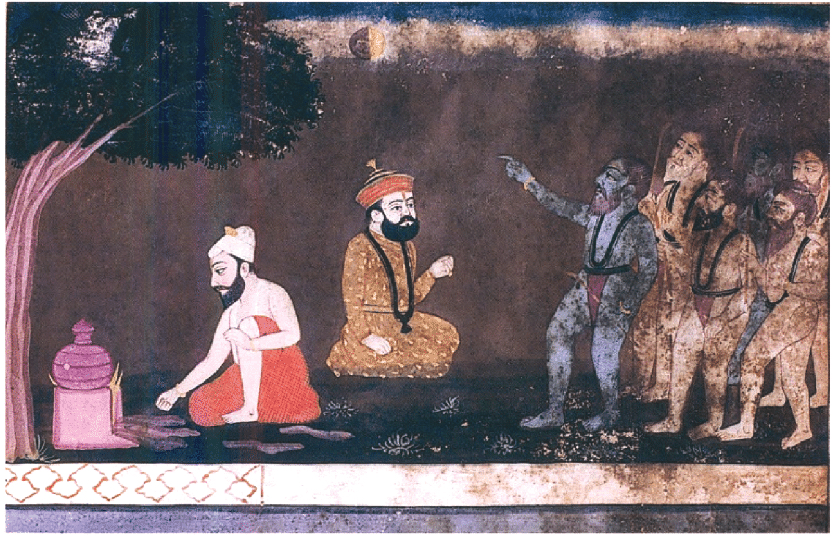
Guru Nanak and the eclipse, a Janamsakhi painting

According to Hinduism, Rahu is responsible for causing an eclipse. During an eclipse, cooked food should not be consumed. Hindus wash off in the Ganges river (which is believed to be spiritually cleansing) directly following an eclipse to clean themselves.

Guru Nanak, when he went to Kurukshetra, asserted that Solar Eclipse is just a natural phenomenon and that bathing in the holy tank, giving alms, and so on to mitigate the effects of solar eclipse is nothing but blind faith.

=== Yajna ===
Yajna refers in Hinduism to any ritual done in front of a sacred fire, often with mantras. Yajna has been a Vedic tradition, described in a layer of Vedic literature called Brahmanas, as well as Yajurveda.

There is no concept of havana and yajna in the Sikh religion.

== Sikhism and Advaita Vedanta ==
Between 1500 and 1800, Vedanta became a very influential tradition, with this period being termed the "Age of Vedānta", which led to other traditions to engage with Vedanta and utilized it for their own interpretations. Some of the nirguṇa sampradāya Sant Mat movements, such as Dadupanth, underwent a process of Vedantaization, becoming what Michael Allen terms "Greater Advaita Vedānta". Amongst the Sikhs, this process also occurred amongst the Udasis and Nirmalas, who began interpreting the Sikh scriptures through a Vedantic lens. However, the Khalsa Sikhs did not experience such a shift. The Giānīā Bungā also utilized Vedanta. Rather than being passive borrowers of Vedanta, the Sikhs were responsible for reshaping it into what Jvala Singh terms Sikh Advaita that focused upon guru-centred devotion. The Sikh Advaita differed from the Advaita Vedanta of Śaṅkarācārya as the Sikh version did not prescribe knowledge (jñāna) as the sole means of liberation. Rather, knowledge had to be combined with devotional practice (bhakti) to achieve liberation. Furthermore, Sikh Advaita prescribes selfless service (sevā), charitable giving (dāna), and righteous warfare (dharmayuddha) as other ways to achieve liberation. Meanwhile, knowledge is seen as only providing temporary liberation on its own and has the potential to lead one astray toward duality. The Suraj Prakash by Kavi Santokh Singh utilizes Advaita Vedanta concepts which are assimilated into the Sikh practices of bhakti and sevā and the scripture (gurbāṇī). Devotion is described as sweet and sugar-like while knowledge is described as dry, dense, and ghee-like, with digested knowledge needing to be "sweetened" by devotion or it will lead to issues. Santokh Singh's conceptualization of Advaita has similarities to the philosophy of Śaṅkaradeva. During the Singh Sabha movement, the usage of Vedānta and Purānic mythology amongst Sikhs was criticized by the reformers as being "Hindu only" (seen exclusively as Hindu), such as by Vir Singh, being explained as Brahminical influences. Thus, Vedanta experienced a decline amongst the Sikhs

== Similarities ==
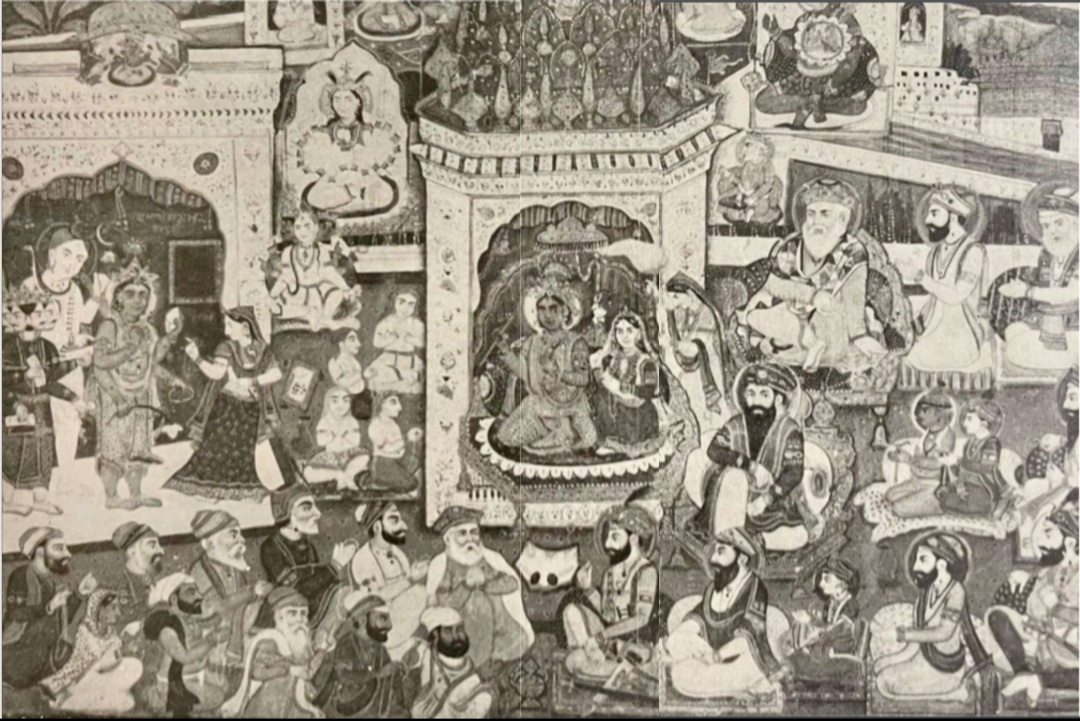
Painting of Indic deities, Sikh gurus, and Bhagats all praying to Akal

- Both Hindus and Sikhs are cremated after death
- Both believe in karma although Sikhism does not necessarily infer a metaphysical soteriology similar to Hinduism
- Both Sikhs and Hindus revere the concept of a guru although the role and concept of a guru in Sikhism is different from that in Hinduism

In the Hindu and Sikh traditions, there is a distinction between religion and culture, and ethical decisions are grounded in both religious beliefs and cultural values. Both Hindu and Sikh ethics are primarily duty based. Traditional teachings deal with the duties of individuals and families to maintain a lifestyle conducive to physical, mental and spiritual health. These traditions share a culture and world view that includes ideas of karma and rebirth, collective versus individual identity, and a strong emphasis on spiritual purity.

The notion of dharma, karma, moksha are very important for both Hindus and Sikhs. Unlike the linear view of life, death, heaven or hell taken in Abrahamic religions, for Hindus and Sikhs believe in the concept of Saṃsāra, that is life, birth and death are repeated, for each soul, in a cycle until one reaches mukti or moksha.

== Culture and intermarriage ==
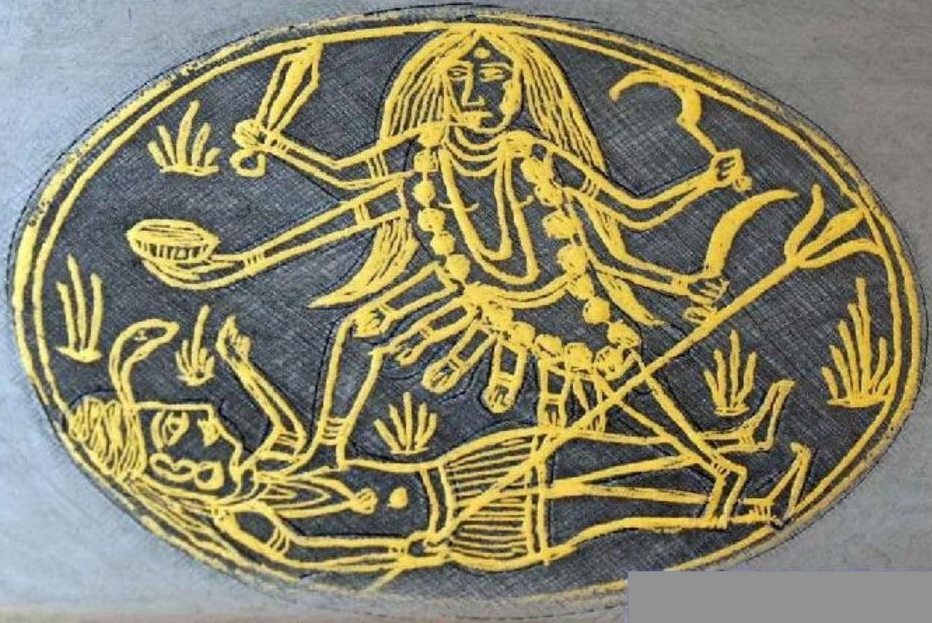
Image of the personified sword, Kalika, found on the reputed Tegha (sword) of Guru Hargobind

While organically related to Hinduism, with the religious philosophy of the Gurus showing both continuity with and reaction against earlier Hindu thought, the Sikh faith is a religion in its own right, with a strong sense of its own identity throughout its existence. Some groups view Sikhism as a tradition within Hinduism along with other Dharmic faiths, even though the Sikh faith is a distinct religion. Historically, Sikhs were seen as the protectors of Hindus, among others, and were even considered by some right-wing Hindu political organizations like the Rashtriya Swayamsevak Sangh as the "sword arm" of Hinduism. This status as protectors of Hindus was strong enough that Punjabi Hindus would sometimes raise their eldest son as a Sikh.

Marriages between Sikhs and Hindus, particularly among Khatris, are frequent. Dogra states that there has always been inter-marriage between the Hindu Khatri and Sikh Khatri communities. William Owen Cole and Piara Singh Sambhi state that for Khatri Sikhs, intermarriage between Hindus and Sikhs of same community was preferable than other communities.

Sikh scriptures are venerated by certain Hindu communities, often by syncretic sects.

== See also ==
- Nanakpanthi
- Udasi
- Sanatan Sikh
- Keshdhari Hindus
- Rashtriya Sikh Sangat
- Idolatry in Sikhism
- Sikhism and Jainism
- Hinduism and Jainism
- Sikhism and Islam
- Hinduism and Islam
