= Hindu Rashtra (book) =

Book authored by Ashutosh

- Front cover
- Author: Ashutosh
- Publisher: Context (Westland Books)
- Publication date: 2019
- Pages: 329

Hindu Rashtra: What It Is. How We Got Here is a book authored by senior journalist Ashutosh and published by Context, an imprint of Westland Publications (Westland Books) in the year 2019. The book describes the capture of political power in India by the Sangh Parivar.

In his book Ashutosh predicts, "To assume that only Muslims or the minority are their (Hindutva proponents) targets will be reading history the wrong way."

As a journalist and politician, the author narrates the sociopolitical scenario of India for the readers to have an idea about the political reality of India with fewer parties as the ruling powerhouses, who are not only shaping a risky future, but are also forcing us to ponder whether this nation will succeed “in withstanding the onslaught this time too” or not.
