= Jalgaon rape case =

Human trafficking case in Jalgaon, India

The Jalgaon rape case was a major case of human trafficking, rape, murder, and sexual slavery that took place in Jalgaon, Maharashtra, India.

== Breaking out and police inquiry ==
Details of the crimes came to light in July 1994. The women, many of them college students, were promised help with university exams in exchange for nude photos which they were later blackmailed with. Some of the men involved would take photos of the women in compromising positions including nude photos taken with hidden cameras. Later the victims would be shown the photos and be told to meet at a local hotel where they would be raped. After posing for the photos and being blackmailed many of the women were forced into prostitution. It was reveled that up to 500 women were victims of which an estimated 100 were raped. It was later revealed that two of the victims were murdered. The first complaint was filed on June 25, 1994 by a medical officer from a local hospital on behalf a sexual assault victim.

Victims were initially hesitant to come forward or later recanted statements made to the police, leading to many of the people involved to be charged with possession of obscene material instead of sexual assault.

== See also ==
- Suryanelli rape case
- Ajmer rape case
