= Ham Hindu Nahin =

Sikh polemical text

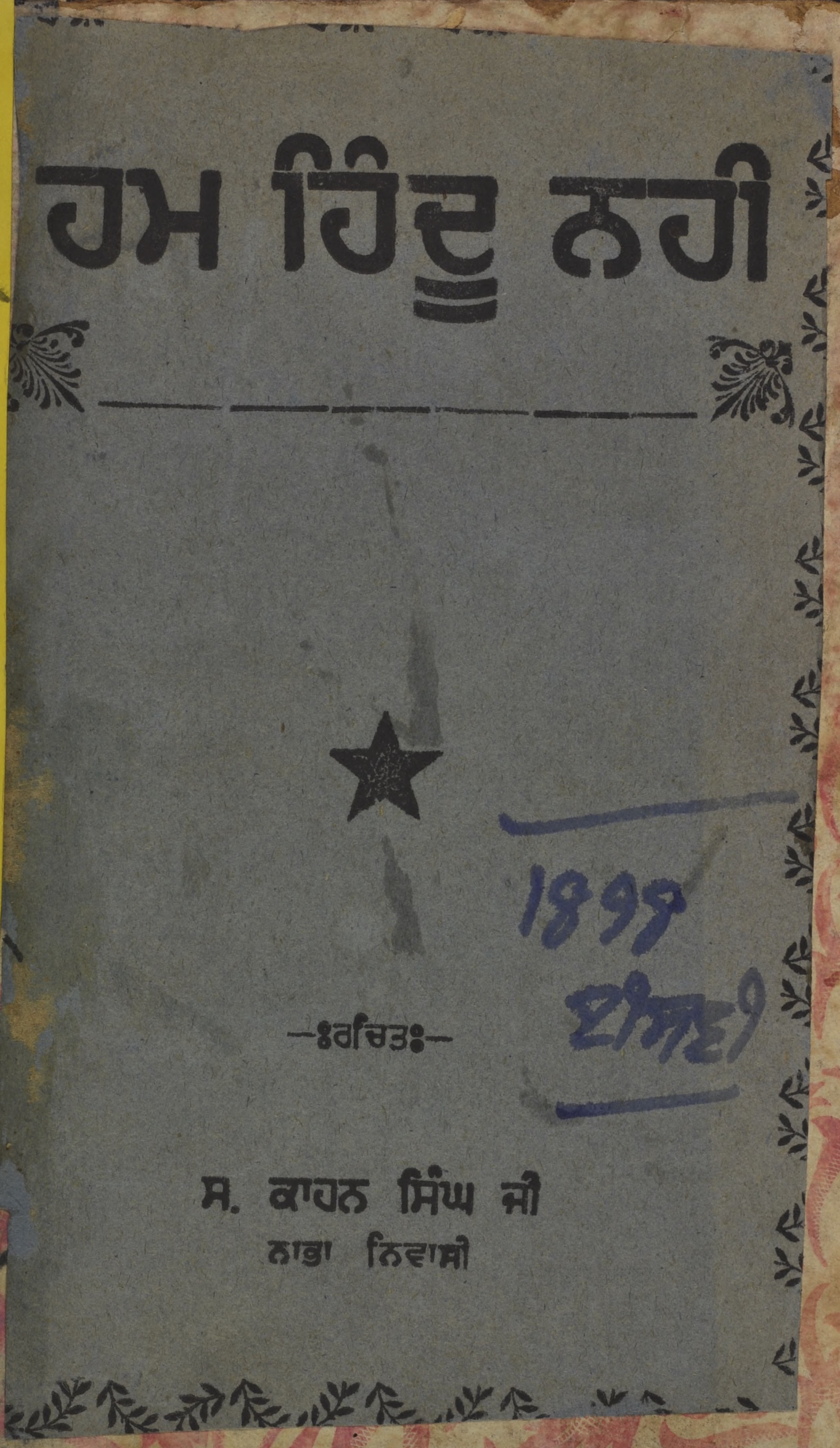
- Cover page of the 1898 first edition of 'Ham Hindu Nahin' ("We Are Not Hindus") by Kahn Singh Nabha. Digitized and provided by the Panjab Digital Library.
- Author: Kahn Singh Nabha
- Original title: ਹਮ ਹਿੰਦੂ ਨਹੀਂ
- Language: Punjabi
- Subject: A critique on the Sikh identity
- Publication date: 1898 (1st ed.)
- Publication place: British India
- Media type: Print
- Pages: 185 (4th ed.)

Ham Hindu Nahin (Punjabi: ਹਮ ਹਿੰਦੂ ਨਹੀਂ, lit. 'We are not Hindus'), also spelled as Hum Hindu Nahin, is a 19th-century Punjabi book by Kahn Singh Nabha, on the distinction of the Sikhism and identity. First published in Punjabi in 1898, the book was registered under this title in the Punjab Gazette on June 30, 1899, at number 447. It is also known as Ham Hindu Nahin Hain.

It is identified as a work of the Tat Khalsa ideology. Pressing its claim vehemently and vigorously to the distinction of the Sikh identity and religion, it concludes with a versified note by the author, describing the characteristics of the Khalsa. It was a representative work of the Singh Sabha movement's push for a more distinct recognition of Sikhism which was separate from Hinduism.

== Description ==
It was first published in Hindi in 1897 with a Punjabi version following in 1898. At the time, some Hindus and Sanatan Sikhs claimed that Sikhism was a sect of Hinduism and that Sikhs were "Hindus" (an identity marker which was recently emerging in the public). The book was principally written as a response to a provocative book published by Thakur Das, a Sanatan Sikh, titled Sikh Hindu Hain (“Sikhs Are Hindus”).

In Nabha's book, a dialogue takes place between a Hindu (who states reasons why Sikhs are Hindus) and a Sikh (who replies with reasons why these points are false), which seeks to assert the differences between the two religions. The Hindu character claims the following points agree that Sikhs are Hindus:

- Sikhs revere the Vedas and Puranas
- Sikhs believe in incarnation
- Sikhs practiced idolatry
- Sikhs maintained fasts
- Sikhs undertook pilgrimages
- Sikhs followed the caste system
- Sikhs protect cows

Kahn Singh attempts to dismantle and refute the above points by referencing Sikh literature (such as the Guru Granth Sahib, Dasam Granth, the Vaaran, and the works of Bhai Nand Lal, Bhai Santokh Singh, among others), claiming that Sikhism had been a distinct identity since the period of the Sikh gurus and that Sikhs only revere the Guru Granth Sahib. The publication proved controversial and Kahn Singh Nabha was temporarily removed from service at Nabha State by then ruler Hira Singh after complaints. An English translation was reviewed by the Government of Punjab, which decided that the work did not intend to degrade any community nor harm any religious community's feelings. Some Sanatan Sikhs praised the work.

== See also ==
- Mahan Kosh
