= Kahn Singh Nabha =

Indian Sikh scholar (1861-1938)

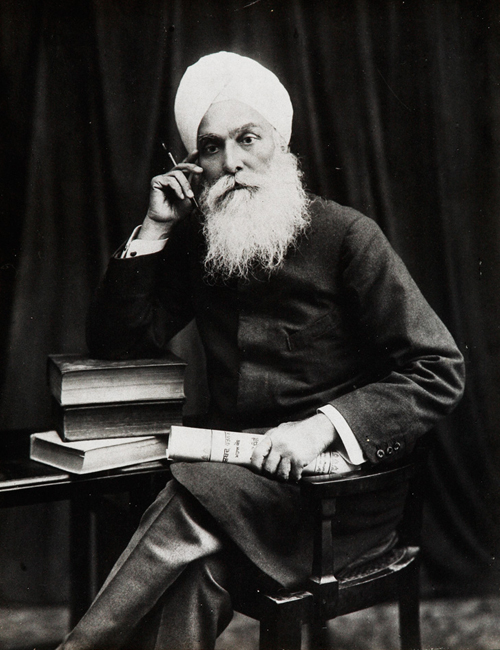
- Born: 30 August 1861; Sabaz Banera, Patiala State, British India
- Died: 23 November 1938 (aged 77); Nabha, Nabha State, British India
- Occupations: Encyclopedist, Lexicographer
- Writing career
- Notable works: Gur Shabad Ratnakar – Mahaan Kosh (1930); Ham Hindu Naahi (1887); Raj Dharam; Gurmat Parbhakar (1898); Gurmat Sudhakar (1899)

Kahn Singh Nabha (30 August 1861 – 24 November 1938) was a Punjabi Sikh scholar, writer, anthologist, lexicographer, and encyclopedist. (Note: His personal name is alternatively spelt as 'Kahan'.) His most influential work, Mahan Kosh, inspired generations of scholars after him. He also played a role in the Singh Sabha Movement. He is connected to the Tat Khalsa.

== Biography ==
He was born into a Sikh family to Narain Singh and Har Kaur at the village of Sabaz Banera, located in what was then Patiala State. His father, Narain Singh succeeded to the charge of Gurdwara Dera Baba Ajaypal Singh at Nabha, after the death of his grandfather Sarup Singh in 1861. Kahn Singh was the eldest of three brothers (the other two being Meehan Singh and Bishan Singh) and one sister (Kahn Kaur).

He did not attend any school or college for formal education, but studied several branches of learning on his own. By the age of 10 he was able to quote freely from the Guru Granth Sahib and Dasam Granth. In Nabha, he studied Sanskrit classics with local pandits and studied under the famous musicologist Mahant Gajja Singh. In Delhi, he studied Persian with Mawlawis.

In 1883, he continued his study of Persian for two years and assisted Gurmukh Singh, a leader in the Singh Sabha Movement, in publishing Sudhararak. In 1887, he was appointed the tutor to Ripudaman Singh, heir apparent to Nabha State. He continued to serve Nabha State in several capacities, from Deputy Commissioner in 1896, to Foreign Minister in 1911, to the personal secretary of Maharaja Hira Singh, to judge of the High Court in 1912. Between 1915-17, he served the neighbouring Patiala State.

In 1885, he had a chance meeting with Max Arthur Macauliffe which led to a lifelong friendship as well as scholarly collaboration between the two. When Max Arthur Macauliffe was researching his six volume work entitled "The Sikh Religion", Macauliffe depended a great deal on his advice and guidance in the work he was then doing on Sikh scriptures and the history of early Sikhism; such was his admiration for Kahn Singh that when it was published by the Clarendon Press Kahn Singh was assigned the copyright of the work.

In 1897–98, a Hindi and Punjabi work called Ham Hindu Nahin was authored by him, which attempts to establish Sikhism and Sikhs as a distinct religion and identity from Hinduism and Hindus. The work was controversial, with Kahn Singh being removed from his service at Nabha State temporarily by Hira Singh after complaints. However, Kahn Singh would later be restored to his service at the state by Hira Singh, becoming the state's envoy with the Political Agent to the Governor General for the Phulkian States and Bahawalpur.

== Works and compositions ==
His books Gurmat Prabhakar and Gurmat Sudhakar are the standard guide books for understanding Sikhism. His work, Mahan Kosh (known as the Sikh encyclopedia), is his magnum opus. He published magazine Khalsa Gazette and is also regarded as one of the founders of the weekly newspaper, Khalsa Akhbar. Works from the period 1882–1911 include:

- Raj Dharam – This was his first book written at a time when he was serving with Maharaja Hira Singh. This was published and distributed on government expense.
- Ham Hindu Nahin (We are not Hindus) – First published in 1898, the book is a critique on the distinction of the Sikh religion and identity. Bhai Kahn Singh stressed upon the distinct identity of the Sikhs. Initially published in Hindi, it was later translated into Punjabi.
- Gurmat Prabhakar (1898) – Studded with examples from Guru Granth Sahib, this book condemns the superstitions prevailing in the Indian society. Difficult words have been made simpler through special commentaries at different places in the book.
- Gurmat Sudhakar (1898) – this book contains evidences from Dasam Granth, Works of Bhai Gurdas, Janam Sakhi Guru Nanak, Gurbilas, Guru Nanak Prakash, Suraj Prakash, Panth Prakash, Sau Sakhi (Guru Ratan Mala), Rehatnama, etc. supporting the various practices and beliefs of Sikhism.
- Sad Parmarth
- Gurchand Divakar (1924)
- Gur Shabdalankar (1924)
- Roop Deep Pingal (ed., 1925)
- Gur Shabad Ratnakar Mahan Kosh (1930) – Also called the Encyclopedia of Sikh Literature, this monumental work was started in 1912 and completed in 1926 after 14 years of research and painstaking effort and finally published by the princely state of Patiala. The state spent Rs.51,000 on its publishing. At 3338 pages, the book was divided into four volumes and was priced at Rs.110. It still serves as one of the most reliable reference material for research on Sikh faith and beliefs and also on the Punjabi culture.
- Gurmat Martand (published posthumously in 1962) – A two-volume work which incorporated the earlier published works Gurmat Prabhakar and Gurmat Sudhakar as well as an unpublished work, Gur Gira Kasauti, from 1899. This work defines and codifies Sikh theological concepts and practice with the help of references called from authentic sources.
- Gur Mahima Sangraha – This book contained the biographies and important works reflecting the Sikh thought of some of the most famous Punjabi and Hindi poets. It is considered as a very important historical document and still remains unpublished.
- Anekarthak Kosh (ed., 1925)
- Naam Mala kosh (ed., 1938)

== See also ==
- Max Arthur Macauliffe
- Singh Sabha Movement
