= Hindu Rashtra Sena =

Hindu activist group

Hindu Rashtra Sena (lit. Army for the Hindu Nation) is an Hindutva organisation in India. Its stated objective is propagating the establishment of a Hindu Rashtra (transl. Hindu Nation). Dhananjay Desai is the head of the Hindu Rashtra Sena (HRS).

== Incident ==
After the murder of a 28-year-old Muslim IT professional from Pune city, its chief Dhananjay Desai and others were arrested. He was released on bail in 2019 after a court hearing. All accused were ultimately acquitted by court in 2023. Desai accused the government of falsely arresting him because of a political vendetta against him.
