= Babbar Khalsa =

Khalistani militant organisation

- Other name: Lions of the True Faith
- Founder: Sukhdev Singh Babbar †
- Leader: Wadhawa Singh Babbar
- Founded: April 1978; 48 years ago
- Active regions: Canada, Germany, Pakistan, United Kingdom
- Ideology: Sikh separatism
- Status: Active

The Babbar Khalsa or Babbar Khalsa International (BK, Punjabi: ਬੱਬਰ ਖ਼ਾਲਸਾ, [bəbːəɾ xɑlsɑ]), is Sikh terrorist organisation that aims to create an independent Sikh state, Khalistan in the Punjab region. It has used armed attacks, assassinations and bombings in aid of that goal, and is deemed to be a terrorist entity by various governments. Besides India, it operates in North America and Europe.

BKI was created in 1978 after clashes with the Nirankari sect of Sikhs. It was active throughout the 1980s in the Punjab insurgency and gained international notoriety in June 1985, for killing 329 civilians (mostly Canadians) in Air India Flight 182 in Canada's worst case of mass murder and for the associated 1985 Narita International Airport bombing in Japan – a bungled attempt at mass murder on Air India Flight 301, intended to happen while both flights were simultaneously airborne to India; an incorrect setting, or a faulty timer, resulted in the second bomb killing two baggage handlers while the suitcase was being transferred to the Air India 747. Its activities and influence severely declined in the 1990s after several of its senior leaders and other militants were killed in encounters with Indian state and central police forces.

The organisation is designated as an international terrorist organisation by the United States, Canada, the United Kingdom, the 27-nation European Union, Japan, Malaysia, and India.

== Origin ==
The name Babbar Khalsa is taken from the Babbar Akali Movement of 1920, which fought against the British Rule of India. The modern-day BK was created in 1978 by Sukhdev Singh Babbar after the 1978 Sikh–Nirankari clash. On 13 April 1978, while observing the founding day of the Khalsa, the Sant Nirankari Mission clashed with the Damdami Taksal and the Akhand Kirtani Jatha, aggravated by Sant Jarnail Singh Bhindranwale and Fauja Singh in which 15 people died. BK was formed with the support of Bibi Amarjit Kaur with Talwinder Singh as the president.

A criminal case was filed against sixty-two Nirankaris by the Akali-led government in Punjab but all the accused were acquitted. The Punjab government Chief Minister Prakash Singh Badal decided not to appeal the decision. The case of Nirankaris received widespread support in the media. Soon an environment was created against the Nirankaris, perceived as the enemies of Sikhism. The chief proponents of this attitude were BK, Akhand Kirtani Jatha, Damdami Taksal and the All India Sikh Students Federation, which was banned by the government.

== Activities ==
=== 1970s ===
Babbar Khalsa started targeting people who sympathised with the Nirankaris. In the subsequent years following this clash, several murders took place in Punjab and the surrounding areas allegedly by Damdami Taksal and the BK. After carrying out attacks, BK members would retreat to the Golden Temple. Police did not enter the temple complex to avoid hurting the sentiments of Sikhs.

=== 1980s ===
According to C. Christine Fair, Babbar Khalsa was opposed to Bhindranwale and more concerned with propagating sectarian violence and enforcing Sikh personal law than supporting Khalistan movement. BK kept up a low level of activity until 1983.

On 24 April 1980, the Nirankari head, Gurbachan Singh was murdered. Initially, associates of Jarnail Singh Bhindranwale and members of BK were suspected, but in 1983, a member of the Akhand Kirtani Jatha, Ranjit Singh, surrendered and admitted to the assassination three years later, and was sentenced to serve thirteen years at the Tihar Jail in Delhi.

One of Babbar Khalsa's earliest activities was the killing of Nirankari Shaadi Lal by Sukhdev Singh Babbar and Kulwant Singh Nagoke. He was the President of Anandpur Sahib Municipality and one of the Nirankari seven stars.

On 9 September 1981, Lala Jagat Narain was assassinated. Narain was a former Punjab Legislative Assembly member and a former Member of Parliament. He was also the found of Hind Samachar. Narain was an outspoken critic of Jarnail Singh Bhindranwale and of the Khalistan movement. After the assassination, Bhindranwale expressed resent against Narain, stating that Narain's newspaper portrayed Sikh Gurus as "lovers of wine and women". Babbar Khalsa claimed responsibility.

Jarnail Singh Bhindranwale offered himself to the police for arrest on 20 September 1981, and was taken to a circuit house instead of prison. Shortly after Bhindranwale courted arrest, agitated Sikhs clashed with the police and paramilitary forces, resulting in the death of 18 protestors. On the day of his arrest, three armed men, from Babbar Khalsa, on a motorcycle opened fire using machine guns in a market in Jalandhar in retaliation, killing four people and injured twelve. The next day, in another incident at Tarn Taran one Hindu man was killed and thirteen people were injured allegedly done by Babbars. On 14 October 1981 Bhindranwale was released by the Punjab Police.

On 16 October 1981, Sukhdev and fellow Babbar Khalsa members attacked Niranjan Singh who was a Nirankari and Indian Administrative Service officer. He was a key accused in the 1978 Sikh-Nirankari clash. Niranjan managed to survive the attack in an injured state, but his brother was killed.

On October 23, 1981, Babbar's killed the Sarpanch of Pannchata Mohinder Pal for blasphemy and beadbi.

On 16 November 1981, 2 Babbar Khalsa members on motorcycles under Sukhdev Singh Babbar killed Parhal Chand the Nirankari head of Kapurathala district. In the killing Chand's father was killed and his brother was injured.

On the morning of 19 November 1981, Police Inspector Pritam Singh Bajwa and Constable Surat Singh were gunned down in Daheru village nearby Khanna in Ludhiana district while attempting to apprehend Tarsem Singh Kalasinghian and his associates hiding at the residence of Amarjit Singh Nihang, all members of BK. This act gained BK and its chief Talwinder Singh Babbar notoriety.

In 1981 Babbar Khalsa split between members in foreign nations under Tawlinder Singh and members in India under Sukhdev Singh Babbar who was made overall head. Sukhdev said no unlawful activity will be done outside of India.

On May 22, 1982, Babbar Khalsa members opened fire directed at Nirankari's in Patti killing 4 and injuring many more.

On October 27, 1982, Surinder Singh Sodhi, Babbar Khalsa members and Labh Singh killed Resham Singh. Resham was the Sant Nirankari head of Hoshiarpur District and 1 of the 7 stars. Babbars, Sodhi and Labh Singh had disguised themselves as police. They had approached Resham posing as officers who just wanted to chat. As Resham was talking about Bhindranwale, supposedly negatively, Babbars, Labh Singh and Sodhi pulled out stenguns and opened fire killing him instantly. It is said that Babbars, Sodhi and Labh Singh fled on a Royal Enfield Bullet and fired victory shots.

On September 10, 1983, Babbar killed Kulwant Singh the Nirankari head of Faridkot.

In 1984 Babbar Khalsa members fought side-by-side with Bhindranwale's men during Operation Blue Star. In the same year, Sukhdev Singh Babbar claimed responsibility for the killing of 76 Nirankaris.

Some terrorists acts committed in Canada, India and Germany have been claimed in the name of BK. Parmar and Kalasinghian were both able to escape from India via the Nepal border and reach Canada. During his residence in Canada, Talwinder Singh continued to lead BKI activities. He was involved in terror financing, recruitment and radicalization of Sikh youths, procurement of small arms and explosives, and the development and coordination of terrorist attacks. After Operation Blue Star the organisation fell into disarray but was able to regroup and remained active.

On 23 June 1985, Babbar Khalsa militants bombed Air India Flight 182 going from Montreal, Canada to New Delhi, India. An improvised explosive device placed inside the cargo hold of the Boeing 747 detonated and destroyed the plane at an altitude of 31,000 feet in Irish airspace and it crashed into the Atlantic Ocean. All 329 passengers were killed, including 268 Canadian, 27 British and 24 Indian citizens.

Parmar and Inderjit Singh Reyat were arrested by the Royal Canadian Mounted Police (RCMP) on explosive charges, linking the two to the Air India Flight 182 bombing and 1985 Narita International Airport bombing. Parmar was acquitted of all charges. Inderjit Singh Reyat admitted to building the bomb, was convicted in the Air India bombing. Reyat a member of the ISYF, was found guilty of manslaughter for making the bombs and had to spend more than 20 years in prison at Canada, and is the only individual convicted in these attacks as of 9 February 2009. The Commission of Inquiry into the Investigation of the Bombing of Air India Flight 182 concluded that, regarding Talwinder Singh Parmar, "[it] is now believed that he was the leader of the conspiracy to bomb Air India flights" Five BK members from Montreal were arrested May 30, 1986, for another plot to bomb Air India flights out of New York City. Newspaper editor Tara Singh Hayer was targeted with a bomb at his office in the same year. Just weeks later, Sikhs from the Hamilton temple along with Air India bombing suspects Talwinder Singh Parmar and Ajaib Singh Bagri were arrested after being wiretapped discussing blowing up the Parliament and kidnapping children of MPs in India. Visiting Punjabi Cabinet Minister Malkiat Singh Sidhu was ambushed in Canada, surviving being shot by four gunmen.

In February 1986 Babbar Khalsa members killed DSP (Deputy Superintendent of Police) Harpal Singh. He was killed along with his father.

On 19 January 1987 Babbar Khalsa members under Sukhdev killed Joginder Pal Pandey in Ludhiana. He was the general secretary of the Indian National Congress Party in Punjab and a member of the Punjab Legislative Assembly. In the attack Pandey's security guard Sohan Lal was killed. Three Babbar's in a vehicle had opened fire when Pandey's car was stopped at a gas station. This incident led to a curfew in Ludhiana.

In September 1987, Babbar Khalsa launched an attack with Gurjant Singh Budhsinghwala. The target was Station house officer Sub-Inspector Mith Singh. Mith Singh had been hand-picked by then chief of Punjab Police Julio F. Riberio. He was picked to deal with Budhsinghwala. Mith Singh had been accused of police brutality and targeting Budhsinghwala's family. Mith Singh had dragged Budhsinghwala's father by his hair in a public humiliation. Budhsinghwala began plotting to kill Mith Singh in revenge for his actions with Husan Singh and Babbar Khalsa members. The attack was carried out by Budshinghwala and fellow Sikh militants on 15 September 1987, at around 9:00 in the morning. Mith Singh was shot while he was walking along with his guard, a police constable. Both of their guns were taken by Budhsinghwala. In the crossfire a schoolboy was also killed and five others were injured. The killing is said to have greatly alarmed Punjab Chief of Police Riberio. Mith Singh was one of his best and most loyal officers.

On October 19, 1989, Babbar Khalsa, KLF, and SSF collectively claimed responsibility for killing 2 Black Cat (NSG), one CID constable and one shop owner indifferent parts of Punjab.

On November 16, 1989, Toofan Singh, Sukhdev Singh Babbar, and other Kharkus of BKI and KLF claimed responsibility for killing a Congress Politician's gunman, a police sergeant, near Batala for killing Babbar Khalsa member Gurnam Singh in a false encounter.

On November 16, 1989, Toofan Singh, Sukhdev Singh Babbar, and other Kharkus of BKI and KLF claimed responsibility for attacking two police stations near Jhanda.

=== 1990s ===
Commandant Gobind Ram was killed on January 10, 1990. Gobind Ram was killed in a bomb blast at the headquarters of the 75th battalion of the Punjab Armed Police in Jalandhar. He was commandant of the 75th battalion. According to an informant Gobind Ram's body had to be swept off the floor. The planning of the killing was done by Toofan Singh and Babbars. The bomb was planted in the cooler of his office. In the blast, three others, including Sub-Inspector Prem Kumar, were killed and at least four were critically wounded. The blast also caused major damage to the building. All the windows of the second floor were broken and a fire broke out on the first floor. Multiple vehicles parked were also damaged. Gobind Ram was known as the "butcher". He was known involved in 38 extrajudicial executions. He had been on the hit list of Sikhs over his role in fake encounters. He had also beat and tortured the wives of Sikhs. He was also known for forcing people to drink urine calling it "Gobind Ram's amrit".

On January 31, 1990, KLF, BKI, KCF, and SSF collectively claimed responsibility for killing Punjab BJP secretary Gurbachan Singh Patanga. In a press note they said that the BJP were greater enemies of the Sikhs than Congress and for this reason Patanga was killed.

On February 12, 1990, SSP of Batala, Samat Kumar Goel, narrowly survived an assassination attempt near Nanak Chak by Babbar Khalsa. Babbar Khalsa members had planted a mine on the road Goel's car was to travel. The mine blew up after Goel's vehicle drove over it. Goel's car faced minor damage in the explosion while the BSF car behind his suffered most of the damage. Following this, Babbar Khalsa members opened fire on Goel's car and security personnel before fleeing.

On February 16, 1990, KCF, BTFK (Sangha), BKI, and SSF collectively claimed responsibility for an explosion in Phillaur that killed Inspector Harcharan Singh Soori and Assistant Sub-Inspector Ram Moorti on the 11th. The bomb also wounded two sergeants. The explosion happened in an armoured and guarded police training facility. Both were put in a special armoured room for extra safety, but were killed at 9 pm from an explosion within their room. Both officers had been accused of torturing Sikhs. Inspector Soori had survived a previous assassination attempt in 1988.

On February 25 and February 26 1990, Babbar Khalsa killed a police informant and five CRPF soldiers.

On March 2, 1990, KCF, KLF, BKI, and SSF collectively claimed responsibility for killing one sergeant and two constables of Punjab Police in Nagoke and two civilians.

On March 16, 1990, Babbar Khalsa members killed three serial rapists near Batala who were wanted in over 40 cases of rape.

On March 16, 1990, Babbar Khalsa claimed responsibility for killing multiple BSF men and one police informant in Zaffarwal.

On April 6, 1990, Babbar Khalsa claimed responsibility for killing one assistant sub-inspector and six constables.

On April 15 1990, 11 civilians were killed and 39 civilians were injured in a bomb blast orchestrated by BK in a Delhi bound bus in Panipat.

On May 14, 1990, Gurcharan Singh Tohra, president of SGPC, was attacked in his car. A jeep with about six militants drove beside Tohra's vehicle and opened fire. An escort car attempted to chase them but they escaped. Tohra managed to survive but was injured. Tohra's bodyguard was also injured. Tohra's driver was killed and so was former MLA H.S. Rajla who was accompanying Tohra. Budhsinghwala, Paramjit Singh Panjwar of Khalistan Commando Force, Sukhdev Singh Babbar of Babbar Khalsa, and Daljit Singh of the All India Sikh Student Federation collectively claimed responsibility. They said he was attacked for his involvement in Operation Blue Star.

On July 23, 1990, KLF, KCF, BKI, and SSF collectively claimed responsibility for killing the Chief Engineer of the SYL, ML Sekhri, and Superintending Engineer of the SYL, Avtar Singh. They were killed while attending a meeting with fellow engineers in Chandigarh.

On September 21, 1990, KCF, KLF, BKI, and SSF claimed responsibility for an attack on a SPO base which killed 2 officers and for killing a Nirankari in Patiala.

On September 28, 1990, KCF, KLF, BKI, and SSF claimed responsibility for killing Inspector Rajinderpal Singh.

On November 23, 1990, KCF, KLF, BKI, BTFK, and SSF claimed responsibility for killing Congress president of Jalandhar district, Gurdarshan Singh. They claimed he was a police informant involved in the killing of militants.

On November 24, 1990, at 9 am Babbar along with other militant groups part of the Sohan Singh Committee killed Superintendent of Police (Operations) Harjit Singh in a bomb blast at Tarn Taran. Sikh militants had been studying Harjit's travel routes for some time. A remote-controlled bomb had been placed on a road Harjit usually drove by to go to the doctor. When Harjit's lead security vehicles drove by and it was just his vehicle over the bomb it was detonated. In the explosion three of his security guards were killed and his vehicle was destroyed. Harjit's limbs were found over 100 meters away from the location of the explosion. A permanent curfew was put on the town after. A saying about the incident is, "He had a security vehicle in front of him and behind him, so he would be safe from all sides. But he didn’t count on his death coming from below". 22 days prior to his death Harjit had killed the chief of BTFK (S) Sukhwinder Singh Sangha along with four other militants. KLF, KCF, Babbar Khalsa, SSF, and BTFK (S) members held a meeting afterward pledging to kill Harjit within 31 days of Sangha's death. Major Singh of KCF was given the lead role in the killing. A famous kavishri ballad about this incident says, "24th November at exactly 9, for Sangha’s revenge Major Singh and his allies have arrived. Without wasting any time Kharkus have come to kill him ... The five jathebandis [groups] had said we would hit him hard ... To become SSP he had done many misdeeds ... Watch how with a computer system [remote-controlled bomb] Kharkus blow him up. Harjit’s wife watches his limbs blow up ... Operation Shera has been done on the SP of Operation."

On June 7, 1991, BTFK (Sangha), KLF, KCF (Panjwar), and SSF claimed responsibility for an assassination attempt on India's Home Minister Subodh Kant Sahay in Ludhiana. Kharkus made a bomb attack on his convoy. Sahay’s bulletproof vehicle flipped over, but he escaped with minor wounds. His driver and one bodyguard were seriously wounded.

On August 23, 1991, Mahinder Singh Bijli Val Babbar and Sher Singh Patti claimed responsibility for an encounter in Uttar Pradesh’s Baznaur. In the 13-hour encounter 15 police officers were killed and 20 injured. Five months later, two BK members assassinated the A.K. Talib, the station director of All India Radio Chandigarh.

On September 7 1991, eight BK militants had an encounter with CRPF personnel near the village of Maujiya. The encounter lasted for 24 hours.

On October 26, 1991, R.N. Goyal, Chief Health Officers Ludhiana, Bachitar Singh Director Health Services Punjab, and five others were killed by KCF, KLF, BTFK, BKI, and SSF. They claimed that the doctors had forged autopsy's, improperly treated Sikhs, and aided in police killings.

In 1992, both Sukhdev Singh Babbar and Talwinder Singh Parmar, after their return to India, were killed in a gunfight encounter between Punjab Police and the duo. Sukhdev Singh Babbar was wanted in 1,000 killings and carried a bounty of 2.5 million rupees.

On August 31 1995, Dilawar Singh Babbar assassinated Punjab Chief Minister Beant Singh in a suicide bomb attack at the civil secretariat in Chandigarh. Dilawar claimed allegiance to the BK and four other members of the BK were named responsible for the killing of Beant Singh.

=== 2000s ===
In the 2000s, Punjab police was able to apprehend several Babbar Khalsa terrorists and was also able to prevent several potential terrorist attacks linked to the organisation.

In 2004, several members of the BK, accused of being involved in the assassination of CM Beant Singh, broke out of the Burail Jail and escaped to Pakistan. All the escapees were recaptured and sentenced to life sentence for the assassination. One of these escapees, Jagtar Singh Hawara, along with another accused was sentenced to death for the assassination in 2007. Three others were sentenced for life in prison. In 2008, another 2 members were convicted and sentenced for 7 years in prison. Hawara's death sentence was later commuted to life sentence in 2010. In 2011, Central Bureau of Investigation moved against the commutation and argued in the Supreme Court of India that the case of Hawara was a "rarest of rare case". In 2010, Paramjit Singh Bheora was sentenced to life imprisonment in 2010.

In May 2005, BK terrorists bombed Liberty Cinema on the G. T. Karnal Road, Delhi during the screening of the Hindi Film, Jo Bole So Nihaal (film). One person was killed and 60 were injured. Several arrests were made in connection including the operatives who carried this attack out and the suppliers of RDX for the arrack. The attack was coordinated from Stuttgart, Germany on the directions of a nephew of the leader of BK, Wadhwa Singh.

On 14 October 2007, BK militants bombed the Shingar Cinema Complex in Ludhiana, Punjab in which 6 people were killed and 37 wounded. The perpetrators were arrested. The police also recovered 2 pistols, 5.10 kg of RDX and 3 detonators from them. The militants had gone to Pakistan with a Sikh jatha for pilgrimage, where they received the training for making bombs. The group received explosive devices from Pakistan across the international border in Bikaner, Rajasthan.

=== 2010s ===
Four Babbar Khalsa members were arrested and later bailed in July 2010 in connection with the murder of a Sikh leader in Punjab, India.

In March 2012, the execution of Balwant Singh Rajoana was stayed by the central government due to appeals by the SGPC. Later in 2013, Rajoana was additionally convicted of recovery of explosives and was sentenced for 10 years. In 2015, after a regime change at the center, Home minister Rajnath Singh ordered relooking to the case .

In a probe by Indian authorities in 2012, it was revealed that Pakistan's intelligence agency Inter-Services Intelligence (ISI) provides immense financial support to BK and has provided over INR 800 million (80 crore) till that date.

On 30 September 2012, retired military general of the Indian armed forces, Lt. Gen Kuldip Singh Brar, who led the Operation Blue Star, was attacked with a knife on Oxford Street, London in an assassination attempt. BK was largely blamed for this attack. On 8 October, 2 suspects were arrested. Another man and a woman were also arrested on the charge. The 4 suspects were brought to trial and convicted for the assassination attempt on 10 December 2013. 2 of them were sentenced for 14 years and 2 were sentenced for 11 years of imprisonment.

On 5 Jan 2015, Jagtar Singh Tara, another accused in the assassination of CM Beant Singh was caught in Thailand and extradited to India.

In March 2017, Balwinder Singh, the head of BK's operations in the United States, was sentenced to 15 years in prison by Nevada U.S. district judge for conspiracy to launch a terrorist attack in India in 2013. Singh pleaded guilty to providing funding and materials to a co-conspirator, who was to travel to India to assassinate or maim an Indian government official. The target government official was to be determined upon the co-conspirator's arrival.

Between 2017 and 2023, many operatives, members and smugglers of BK were arrested within the territory of India and imprisoned by Indian courts as Punjab saw a new rise in Khalistani presence in the state. The leadership of BKI operated primarily from UK, Germany and Pakistan.

== Financing ==
The group receives funds and support from its supporters within the Sikh community, that are largely located in Europe and North America. Historically, to get the financial and material support needed for operating terrorist activities, Babbar Khalsa has used in-person meetings, public rallies and fundraising events. Babbar organized and featured at Sikh rallies and fundraisers across Canada. Babbar was instrumental in channeling financial support to BKI from overseas Sikh communities. BKI is sponsored by Germany-based extremist organisations with an aim to revive an armed conflict in Punjab.

=== Sanctions ===
In 2025, several UK-based organizations and entities, including the Panjab Warriors sports investment firm, Saving Punjab, Whitehawk Consultations Ltd, and the unincorporated group Loha Designs, had sanctions imposed under the UK’s Domestic Counter-Terrorism Regime for alleged links to the pro-Khalistan militant groups Babbar Khalsa and Babbar Akali Lehar. These sanctions, applied in connection with their association with businessman Gurpreet Singh Rehal, included asset freezes, restrictions on financial transactions, and prohibitions on company directorships. HM Treasury assessed that Rehal was involved in promoting and encouraging, carrying out recruitment activities for organisation, including purchasing weapons and other military material

== Presence ==
Babbar Khalsa militants have their presence outside of India in Pakistan, North America, Europe and Scandinavia. BKI at present is active in the US, Canada, the UK, Belgium, France, Germany, Norway, Switzerland and Pakistan. BKI continues its operations from Pakistan with the support of Pakistan's Inter-Services Intelligence (ISI). According to Indian sources the group has its headquarters in Lahore, Pakistan.

In 1992, Talwinder Singh Babbar split from the BKI and formed the BK (Babbar) faction. This happened after serious differences erupted between Babbar and BKI's leadership. The Babbar faction has a presence in the UK, Belgium, Germany and Switzerland.

== Babbar Khalsa and ISI ==
Pakistani's Inter-Service Intelligence have been accused for backing and funding Babbar Khalsa in order to create internal disturbances in India. Recently in Punjab in India, Punjab Police have detained six Babbar Khalsa International terrorists who have been backed by ISI in order to execute an explosive detonation in the liquor shops in Batala.

=== Bans ===
It is officially banned and designated as an international terrorist organisation by several countries.

- Canada
- European Union
- India
- Japan
- Malaysia
- United Kingdom
- United States

== See also ==
- Dal Khalsa (International)
- Khalistan Liberation Force
- Insurgency in Punjab, India
- Khalistan Zindabad Force
- Jagtar Singh Hawara
- Balwant Singh Rajoana
- Sikh massacre in Pilibhit forest
