= Jhanda (disambiguation) =

Jhanda may refer to:

- Jhanda is a town in Swabi District of Khyber-Pakhtunkhwa.
- Jhanda Bagga Nawan is a village in the Firozpur district of Punjab, India.
- Jhanda (Ludhiana West) is a village in Ludhiana district of Punjab, India.
- Jhanda Singh Dhillon was a famous royal Sikh warrior.
- Madho Jhanda is a village in Kapurthala district of Punjab, India.
