= Sukhdev Singh Dasuwal =

Indian Sikh militant (1955-1992)

Sukhdev Singh Babbar

Co-Chief of Babbar Khalsa
- In office 1978–1992
- Preceded by: Position established
- Succeeded by: Uncertain

Personal details
- Born: Sukhdev Singh Dasuwal; 9 August 1955 Dassuwal, Punjab, India
- Died: 9 August 1992 (aged 37) Patiala, Punjab, India

Sukhdev Singh Dasuwal (9 August 1955 − 9 August 1992), known as Sukhdev Singh Babbar, was an Indian militant, Sikh separatist, and co-leader of Babbar Khalsa International (BKI), a Sikh militant organisation involved in the pursuit of creating a Sikh nation named as "Khalistan". BKI was founded by Talwinder Singh Parmar, himself, and Amarjit Kaur. He commanded BKI continuously for 14 years until he was killed in 1992. Sukhdev was wanted in multiple cases of murder, extortion, kidnapping, and sexual assault. He served as a key planner of militant attacks and the biggest supplier of weapons and bombs to militants from Pakistan.

== Early life ==
Sukhdev Singh Dasuwal was born on 9 August 1955 to Jind Singh and Harnam Kaur in a Sandhu Jatt Sikh family of the village Dassuwal, Patti, Tarn Taran, Punjab, India. He studied up to the middle school level. He had three brothers. His elder brother, Mehal Singh "Babbar", is also an active leader of the Babbar Khalsa International (BKI). The older brother of all three, Angrej Singh, is blind. His family owned 18 acres (73,000 m^{2}) of land in the village of Dassuwal. The wives of Sukhdev and Mehal are sisters who belonged to the adjoining village of Ghariala. He took Amrit and became a Khalsa in 1977.

== Militancy ==
=== Beginning ===
As per The Tribune, the day of the Sikh–Nirankari clashes (13 April 1978) was also the day when his marriage was fixed. On this day, he took a pledge to take revenge on the Sant Nirankari Mission, a sub-sect of the Nirankari sect of Sikhism. He founded BKI along with Talwinder Singh Parmar with the objective to secede from India and form the state of Khalistan for Sikhs. BKI's first goals were to kill the Nirankari head and the Nirankari seven stars who were the Sant Nirankari version of the Panj Pyare. Sukhdev was the president of BKI. It was considered as the best armed and funded among the Khalistani militant groups.

=== Attacks on Nirankaris ===
In the period following the Nirankari clash and until Operation Blue Star Sukhdev led BKI in committing a targeted killing program against Nirankaris and anyone suspected of supporting the Nirankaris. In 1984 Sukhdev publicly claimed responsibility for killing 35 Nirankaris and later in the same year 78 Nirankaris.

In 1981 BKI split between members in foreign nations under Tawlinder Singh and members in India under Sukhdev who was made overall head. Sukhdev said no unlawful activity will be done outside of India. The first unit of BKI was founded in Canada in 1981. This organisation has a presence in the United States, Canada, UK, Germany, France, Belgium, Norway, Switzerland and Pakistan. BKI became a major participant in Khalistan movement under his guidance and participated in hundreds of operations against Indian security forces and remained active in several Indian states.

One of BKI's earliest activities was the killing of Nirankari Shaadi Lal by Sukhdev and Kulwant Singh Nagoke. He was the President of Anandpur Sahib Municipality and one of the Nirankari seven stars.

On 16 October 1981, Sukhdev and fellow BKI militants attacked Niranjan Singh who was a Nirankari and Indian Administrative Service officer. He was the Deputy Commissioner of Gurdaspur. He was a key accused in the 1978 Sikh-Nirankari clash. Niranjan managed to survive the attack in an injured state, but his brother was killed. On 16 November 1981, 2 BKI militants on motorcycles under Sukhdev killed Parhal Chand the Nirankari head of Kapurathala district. He was one of also the seven Nirankari stars. In the killing, Chand's father was killed and his brother was injured. On 22 May 1982, BKI militants opened fire directed at Nirankari's in Patti killing 4 and injuring many more.

On 10 September 1983, Sukhdev killed Kulwant Singh the Nirankari head of Faridkot.

=== Split from Jaranil Singh Bhindranwale and aftermath ===
Sukhdev had initially aligned himself with Jaranil Singh Bhindranwale, but formed a closer alliance with Harchand Singh Longowal and the Akali Dal who had a falling out the Bhindranwale in 1983. Sukhdev led the BKI to confronting and occupying the Guru Nanak Niwas from Bhindranwale who reloacted to the Akal Takht. Sukhdev served as Longowal's personal guard and arm against Bhindranwale until Operation Blue Star. The BKI force, numbering around 150, took posts against the Indian Army during the operation while Sukhdev himself escaped.

=== Various assassinations and attacks ===
In February 1986 BKI militants killed Punjab Police DSP Harpal Singh. He was killed along with his father.

On 19 January 1987, BKI militants under Sukhdev killed Joginder Pal Pandey in Ludhiana. He was the general secretary of the Indian National Congress Party in Punjab and a member of the Punjab Legislative Assembly. In the attack Pandey's security guard Sohan Lal was killed. Three BKI militants in a vehicle had opened fire when Pandey's car was stopped at a gas station. This incident led to a curfew in Ludhiana.

BKI launched an attack in September 1987 with Gurjant Singh Budhsinghwala of Khalistan Commando Force (KCF). The target was Station House Officer (SHO) Sub-Inspector Mith Singh. Mith Singh had been hand-picked by then chief of Punjab Police Julio F. Riberio. He was picked to deal with Budhsinghwala. Mith Singh had been accused of police brutality and targeting Budhsinghwala's family. Budhsinghwala began plotting to kill Mith Singh with Husan Singh and BKI militants. The attack was carried out by Budshinghwala and fellow Sikh militants on 15 September 1987 at around 9am. Mith Singh was shot while he was walking along with his guard, a police constable. Both of their guns were taken by Budhsinghwala. In the crossfire a schoolboy was also killed and five others were injured. The killing is said to have greatly alarmed Punjab Chief of Police Riberio. Mith Singh was one of his best and most loyal officers.

Commandant Gobind Ram was killed on 10 January 1990. Gobind Ram was killed in a bomb blast at the headquarters of the 75th battalion of the Punjab Armed Police in Jalandhar. He was commandant of the 75th battalion. The planning of the killing was done by Toofan Singh and BKI militants. The bomb was planted in the cooler of his office. In the blast, three others, including Sub Inspector Prem Kumar, were killed and at least four were critically wounded. The blast also caused major damage to the building. All the windows of the second floor were broken and a fire broke out on the first floor. Multiple vehicles parked were also damaged. He had been on the hit list of Sikhs over his alleged role in 38 fake encounters.

On 16 February 1990, KCF, Bhindranwale Tiger Force of Khalistan Sangha (BTKF (S)), BKI, and Sikh Students Federation (SSF) collectively claimed responsibility for an explosion in Phillaur that killed Inspector Harcharan Singh Soori and Assistant Sub-Inspector Ram Moorti on the 11th. The bomb also wounded 2 Sergeants. The explosion happened in an armoured and guarded police training facility. Both were put in a special armoured room for extra safety, but were killed at 9 pm from an explosion within their room. Both officers had been accused of torturing Sikhs. Inspector Soori had survived a previous assassination attempt in 1988.

On 25 February 1990, BKI killed a police informant involved in the killing of their militants.

On 26 February 1990, BKI attack a Central Reserve Police Force patrol near Ajab Vali killing 5 soldiers and injuring 6.

On 2 March 1990, KCF, KLF, BKI, and SSF collectively claimed responsibility for killing 1 Sergeant and 1 Constable of Punjab Police in Nagoke for alleged "misdeeds".

On 2 March 1990, KCF, KLF, BKI, and SSF collectively claimed responsibility for a bomb attack in Philaur that killed 1 police constable and 2 others. They stated that they were killed because they had put fake cases on locals.

On 16 March 1990, BKI militants killed 3 serial rapists near Batala who were wanted in over 40 cases of rape.

On 16 March 1990, BKI claimed responsibility for killing multiple Border Security Force men in Zaffarwal.

On 16 March 1990, KLF, SSF, BKI, and KCF claimed responsibility for killing a police informant named Bhagwant Singh who was involved in over 50 killings. He was also a key associate of Gobind Ram.

On 6 April 1990, BKI claimed responsibility for killing 1 Assistant Sub-Inspector and 6 Constables.

On 14 May 1990, Gurcharan Singh Tohra, president of SGPC, was attacked in his car. A jeep with about six militants drove beside Tohra's vehicle and opened fire. An escort car attempted to chase them but they escaped. Tohra managed to survive but was injured. Tohra's bodyguard was also injured. Tohra's driver was killed and so was former MLA H. S. Rajla who was accompanying Tohra. Budhsinghwala and Paramjit Singh Panjwar of KCF, Sukhdev of BKI, and Daljit Singh of SSF collectively claimed responsibility. They said he was attacked for his involvement in Operation Blue Star.

On 23 July 1990, KLF, KCF, BKI, and SSF collectively claimed responsibility for killing the Chief Engineer of the Sutlej Yamuna link canal (SYL), ML Sekhri, and Superintending Engineer of the SYL, Avtar Singh. They were killed while attending a meeting with fellow engineers in Chandigarh.

On 21 September 1990, KCF, KLF, BKI, and SSF claimed responsibility for an attack on a SPO base which killed 2 officers.

On 21 September 1990, KCF, KLF, BKI, and SSF claimed responsibility for killing a Nirankari in Patiala.

On 28 September 1990, KCF, KLF, BKI, and SSF claimed responsibility for killing Inspector Rajinderpal Singh.

On 23 November 1990, KCF, KLF, BKI, BTFK, and SSF claimed responsibility for killing Indian National Congress president of Jalandhar district, Gurdarshan Singh. They claimed he was a police informant involved in the killing of militants.

On 24 November 1990, at 9 am Sukhdev along with other militant groups part of the Sohan Singh Committee killed Superintendent of Police (Operations) Harjit Singh in a bomb blast at Tarn Taran. Sikh militants had been studying Harjit's travel routes for some time. A remote-controlled bomb had been placed on a road Harjit usually drove by to go to the doctor. When Harjit's lead security vehicles drove by and it was just his vehicle over the bomb it was detonated. In the explosion three of his security guards were killed and his vehicle was destroyed. A permanent curfew was put on the town after. Twenty-two days prior to his death Harjit had killed the chief of BTFK (S) Sukhwinder Singh Sangha along with four other militants. Khalistan Liberation Force (KLF), KCF, BKI, SSF, and BTFK (S) members held a meeting afterward pledging to kill Harjit. Major Singh of KCF was given the lead role in the killing.

On 26 October 1991, R. N. Goyal, Chief Health Officers Ludhiana, Bachitar Singh Director Health Services Punjab, and 5 others were killed by KCF, KLF, BTFK, BKI, and SSF. They claimed that the doctors had forged autopsy’s, improperly treated Sikhs, and aided in police killings.

== Death ==
He died on 9 August 1992, in a gunfight when heavily armed policemen stormed a villa in the city of Patiala in early August and captured him. At the time, he was India's most wanted Khalistani extremist.

It is reported that India used the CAT system, to trap Sukhdev. He was captured with the help of a former BKI militant member turned police-cat Gurmeet Singh Pinki, who informed on him in exchange for a reward of ₹ 10,00,000. This former member helped trap Sukhdev by arranging a meeting of top BKI militants, ostensibly to work out future strategy. For helping neutralise the chief of the most powerful group of militants in the state, the turned member also received a third of the reward on Singh.

== Aftermath ==
After the death of Sukhdev, his followers killed policemen in retaliation.

After his death, Punjab Police DGP Kanwar Pal Singh Gill accused Sukhdev of living a "king-like" lifestyle. In his book, "Punjab: The Knights of Falsehoods", he accused Sukhdev of living a lavish lifestyle contradictory to the ideals of his organisation, and claimed that he owned multiple lavish bungalows. He further accused Sukhdev of living with Jawahar Kaur, a member of a popular singing group "Nabhe Wallian Bibian Da Jatha", and fathering an illegitimate child.

After his death his family members left their home and moved abroad. A major portion of his ancestral house of the Sukhdev now stands demolished and the remaining dilapidated two-room set is locked.
