= Gandhi Global Family medals and awards =

The Gandhi Global Family medals and awards are awards offered by the Gandhi Global Family for contributions to society.

Nirankari Baba Hardev Singh Ji representing Sant Nirankari Mission received the medal on 26 November 2013.
