= Sukhdev (name) =

Sukhdev may refer to:

- Sukhdev Ahluwalia (born 1932), Indian cameraman
- Sukhdev Singh Babbar (1955–1992), India's most wanted militant and the co-founder of Babbar Khalsa International
- Sukhdev Singh Dhindsa (born 1936), member of the Rajya Sabha
- Sukhdev Singh Libra (born 1932), member of the 15th Lok Sabha
- Sukhdev Singh Kang, politician, former Governor of Kerala
- Sukhdev Singh Sukha (1962–1992), member of the militant organization Khalistan Commando Force and one of the assassins of Arun Vaidya, the Chief of Indian army at the time of Operation Blue Star and also the architect of Operation Blue Star
- Sukhdev Thapar (1907-1931), Indian revolutionary
