= Toofan Singh =

Sikh militant from India

- Born: Jugraj Singh; 1971; Sri Hargobindpur, Punjab, India
- Died: 8 April 1990 (aged 18–19); Sri Hargobindpur, Punjab, India
- Years active: 1987-1990
- Organization: Khalistan Liberation Force
- Known for: Khalistani militancy

Jugraj Singh (1971 – 8 April 1990), better known as Toofan Singh, was a militant member of the Khalistan Liberation Force who was born in 1971 in Sri Hargobindpur, Punjab, India. According to police records, he was allegedly involved in 150 killings. He was killed in an encounter with police on 8 April 1990.

== Early life ==
Born in 1971 as Jugraj Singh in Cheema village of Punjab. He had 5 sisters and was the only son of his parents. He took amrit at 6 and would regularly read Gurbani and do Simran. He would read about Sikh history commonly and was known for being soft-spoken and well mannered.

== Militancy ==
In 1984, he was emotionally affected by the news of Operation Blue Star. He began to believe that he has to do something about the alleged atrocities against Sikhs. In his younger days, he spent some days in the Nabha Jail. In the jail, he met with Manbir Singh Chaheru and Baldev Singh. Baldev Singh told Jugraj that he should avoid getting into these fights since he is the only son of his family, however, Jugraj would not change his path.

In 1987 Toofan Singh broke out of Hoshiarpur Jail, and came into contact with Avtar Singh Brahma the chief of Khalistan Liberation Force(KLF) and he would fight under him. In 1988 Gurjant Singh Budhsinghwala took over KLF. He made Toofan Singh Lieutenant General of KLF. He would later rise to Deputy Chief of KLF.

Toofan Singh was said to have provided protection to the villagers from attacks and extortion by criminal gangs, and the police. He was most active in the districts of Gurdaspur, Amritsar, Kapurthala, and Hoshiarpur.

=== Attacks on police ===
At Sri Hargobindpur Toofan Singh and 5 others attacked a police party on 1 November 1988. In the attack 1 Sergeant was wounded, and 1 Constable was also wounded.

In December 1988, near Sri Hargobindpur, Toofan Singh and others attack SHO (Station House Officer) Swaran Singh and officers with him. No one was hurt in the attack.

On 20 October 1989, Toofan Singh in a joint statement with Sukhdev Singh Babbar and Kanwarjit Singh of Khalistan Commando Force claimed responsibility for looting Rahi Butari’s police station of 7 .303 Bore Rifles, 1 Stengun, 300 cartridges, and a helmet. They also claimed responsibility for an attack on a police outpost in Sakhowal and after exploding the outpost with a bomb. In the attack 1 officers was killed and 5 wounded. Toofan and the others further claimed responsibility for exploding a BSF vehicle with a mine in Rasulpur injuring 6 BSF men.

On 16 November 1989, Toofan Singh, Sukhdev Singh Babbar, and other Kharkus of BKI and KLF claimed responsibility for killing a Congress Politician's gunman, a police sergeant, near Batala for killing Babbar Khalsa member Gurnam Singh in a false encounter.

On 16 November 1989, Toofan Singh, Sukhdev Singh Babbar, and other Kharkus of BKI and KLF claimed responsibility for attacking two police stations near Jhanda.

On 18 February 1990, Toofan Singh claimed responsible for the killing of BSF Deputy Commandant Davinder Singh, Assistant Commandant Lachman Singh and one more soldier in a bomb blast near Kot Todar Mal. 6 others were injured, including 3 critically. The bomb was a remote controlled device which was planted on the road. The bomb was detonated as a BSF patrol drove over it.

Toofan Singh killed 6 Black Cat commandos in Dand Manesh.

=== Killing Commandant Gobind Ram ===
Commandant Gobind Ram was killed on 10 January 1990, in a bomb blast at the headquarters of the 75th battalion of the Punjab Armed Police in Jalandhar. He was commandant of the 75th battalion. The planning of the killing and the killing was done by Toofan Singh and Babbar Khalsa members. The bomb was planted in the cooler of his office. In the blast, 3 others, including Sub Inspector Prem Kumar, were killed and at least 4 were critically wounded. The blast also caused major damage to the building. All the windows of the second floor were broken and a fire broke out on the first floor. Multiple vehicles parked were also damaged. Gobind Ram had been on the hit list of Sikh militants over his alleged role in fake encounters and torturing Sikhs.

=== Various actions ===
Toofan Singh killed a thief named Hari Singh and also killed another Balwinder Singh Billa who looted dead bodies near Sri Hargobindpur.

Toofan Singh killed one Dr. Veer Singh of Cheem Khudi who would extorted people posing as a member of Khalistan Liberation Force.

In a meeting with top KLF leaders in Sri Hargobindpur Toofan Singh issued a statement where he took responsibility for an explosion at a liquor store in Batala. 15 people were killed, 50 were injured, 4 shops were blown up, and 1 van was blown up in the explosion.

== Death ==
On 8 April 1990, Singh was killed in a village near Hargobindpur. His associate, Bakshish Singh, was also killed in the encounter. According to police records, he was allegedly involved in 150 killings. According to police the encounter began at 7 AM when police had signaled a tractor to stop which responded with opening fire and hurling grenades. The militants continued fleeing and firing for 2 hours and were eventually surrounded and killed. Director General of Police K. P. S. Gill dubbed it as the biggest accomplishment of police the whole year. At the time Toofan Singh had a reward of 100,000 rupees on his head.

== Legacy ==
Singh was considered as a local martyr of the Khalistan movement

In 2017, an Indian biographical film based on the life of Singh was released, titled Toofan Singh. The Indian Central Board of Film Certification later banned the film.
