= Sudiksha =

Sudiksha may refer to:

- Disappearance of Sudiksha Konanki
- Sudiksha (Sant Nirankari mission) spiritual head of the Nirankari Mission
- Sudiksha Thirumalesh case British woman who died in September 2023 at the age of 19 after a court case
