= Fauja Singh (Sikh leader) =

Sikh killed in protest against Nirankari

- Photograph of Fauja Singh giving a speech to American Sikhs at the Gurdaspur jail
- Born: Fauja Singh; 17 May 1936; Gurdaspur, Punjab (British India)
- Died: 13 April 1978 (aged 41)
- Cause of death: Killed in protest against Nirankari
- Spouse: Amarjit Kaur
- Parent: Surain Singh

Fauja Singh (17 May 1936 - 13 April 1978) was one of 13 Sikhs killed in violence during a protest against the Sant Nirankaris in 1978.

== Early life ==
Singh was born in District Gurdaspur. His father, Surain Singh, was a middle class farmer. After the formation of Pakistan they moved to the village of Gazneepur, which is 6 miles on the Gurdaspur-Dera Baba Nanak Road.

In 1964, he got baptised by taking Khande di Pahul (also called Amrit Sanchar) at a smagam organised by the Akhand Kirtani Jatha. On Vaisakhi 1965 his marriage took place with Amarjit Kaur.

Professionally, he was an agriculture inspector.

== Baisakhi Day, 1978 ==
On13 April 1978, Sikhs led by Fauja Singh went to protest against the Nirankari procession and against Nirankari Gurbachan Singh's apparent insults against the Gurus. 16 people, including 13 Sikhs, were killed in the ensuing clashes.

== Cremation ==
The cremation of the 13 Sikhs took place on 15 April 1978, in front of Gurdwara Siri Ramsar Sahib and in the presence of a large congregation of about 25-30,000 people. All these Sikhs were cremated together. Jarnail Singh Bhindranwale also attended the cremation.

== Afterwards ==
In 1989, Shaheed Bhai Fauja Singh Charitable Trust was established in the city of Amritsar to take care of the orphaned children of Sikh martyrs and any other orphan children irrespective of their caste and creed. This trust is being run by Fauja Singh's widow Amarjit Kaur.

In April 2003, a Sikh gathering held at village Pheruman, 40 kilometers from the city of Amritsar, paid tributes to Fauja Singh and the other 12 Sikhs who died in April 1978. Chief of supreme Sikh authority, Akal Takhat, addressed this event.

In April 2009 in Amritsar, Khalsa Action Committee and Dal Khalsa activists declared Fauja Singh and other 12 Sikhs "martyrs of faith". Dal Khalsa separately paid homage to Singh.
