= 1978 Sikh–Nirankari clash =

Violent conflict in Amritsar, India

- Photograph of the bodies of the deceased Sikhs in the aftermath of the clash
- Date: 13 April 1978
- Location: Amritsar, Punjab, India
- Caused by: Sikh-Sant Nirankari tensions stemming from the 1950s; Proclamations and actions by Sant Nirankari leader Gurbachan Singh seen as provocative to the Sikh community; Alleged state support to Sant Nirankaris, police presence
- Methods: Protest
- Result: Sectarian violence; 16 casualties; 150 injured; Splintering of Akhand Kirtani Jatha

Parties
Sant Nirankari Mission; Punjab Police	Khalsa Sikh groups: Akhand Kirtani Jatha; Damdami Taksal; Akali-Nihang

Lead figures
Gurbachan Singh	Fauja Singh †; Jarnail Singh Bhindranwale

Number
Unknown	~200

Casualties and losses
3 Sant Nirankaris killed	13 Khalsa Sikhs dead 150 injured

Casualties
- Deaths: 16
- Arrested: 62

The 1978 Sikh–Nirankari clash, also known as the Sikh–Nirankari Kand, occurred between the Sant Nirankari Mission and Sikhs of Damdami Taksal and Akhand Kirtani Jatha on 13 April 1978 in Amritsar, Punjab, India. Sixteen people—thirteen traditional Sikhs and three Nirankari followers—were killed in the ensuing violence, occurring when some Akhand Kirtani Jatha and Damdami Taksal members led by Fauja Singh protested against and tried to stop a convention of Sant Nirankari Mission followers. This incident is considered to be a starting point in the events leading to Operation Blue Star and the 1980s Insurgency in Punjab.

== Background ==
The Sant Nirankari Mission splintered from the Nirankari sect in the 20th century. Nirankari, a movement within Sikhism, started in the mid-19th century. Their belief in a living guru as opposed to the scriptural guru, Guru Granth Sahib, developing over the decades especially in one branch, resulted in their difference with traditional Sikhs, though they were tolerated. A Nirankari hymn-singer, Boota Singh, had been removed from his paid duties due to "personal lapses" considered incongruous in a missionary organization, and in 1929 tried and failed to set up a rival organization in Peshawar, nominating his devotee Avtar Singh, a bakery shop owner, as his successor in 1943. Without having established any significant religious base, Avtar Singh moved to Delhi after partition, getting his group registered as the "Sant Nirankaris" in 1948, which were "much different" from the successors of the original Nirankari movement they splintered from.

His son Gurbachan Singh succeeded him in 1963, and tensions with the Sikhs escalated as he subsequently proclaimed himself as a godman and incarnation of Guru Nanak, styling himself as bājjāṅwālā (Punjabi for "master of the hawk"), an epithet of Guru Gobind Singh, using the names of the Sikh Gurus for his servants, and coming out with publications like the Avtar Bani, which made derogatory references to the Guru Granth Sahib, the primary scripture of Sikhism. A story in the Yug Purush narrated that, unlike the prophets of the world's major religions, who refused to go back to earth to "spread God’s message", Avtar Singh had decided to do so "only after God agreed that anyone blessed by him would go to heaven irrespective of worldly deeds". By the 1970s, Gurbachan Singh had begun to put himself on par with the Guru Granth Sahib. Sacrilegious versions of Sikh rituals, including administering to his sat sitāre, or seven stars, his version of the Panj Piare of Guru Gobind Singh, "charan amrit", the water used to wash his feet, in place of the amrit, or holy water mixed with sugar by a steel blade, as dictated by Guru Gobind Singh for the Amrit Sanchar.

Clashes between the Sikhs and the Sant Nirankaris took place beginning in the early 1950s, and tensions simmered through the 1960s, during which the Damdami Taksal came to the forefront to counter Sant Nirankari influence, as well as the Akhand Kirtani Jatha at many places in Punjab. The skirmishes were attributed in significant part to political machinations to maintain a rift between the Shiromani Akali Dal and the Damdami Taksal, using the willing Sant Nirankaris to do so; Bhindranwale was being harassed and provoked by senior Sant Nirankari officials in the Punjab administration.

=== Government support ===
The Akalis claimed that the Sant Nirankaris were supported by the Indian National Congress to divide and undermine the Sikh community, while many Sikhs suspected that the Nirankaris were aided and abetted by the Central Government and the urban Hindu elite in Punjab, who were the base of the Jan Sangh, the Akali Dal's coalition partner, and from whom the Sant Nirankaris received donations from; hence why the Akalis had permitted the convention.

The Sant Nirankaris had Congress ties at the time of the event: they had firmly supported Emergency rule, and developed close links with many Congress politicians and bureaucrats, creating a strong foothold in Delhi political circles; this gave rise to opposition from the Akalis and the Damdami Taksal during the same period.

This reported continuous support of the organization by the central government was also evidenced by the fact that, during a very short span, the Sant Nirankaris established 354 branches: 27 abroad and the rest in India, with large amounts of property. The organization created a paramilitary branch called the Seva Dal, with a membership of over 7,000, headed by a commander, called a mukhya shishak (chief teacher).

The Akali Dal's Janata Party allies, on the pretext of "religious freedom", warned the Akalis not to intervene in the growing tensions, against the wishes of a large section of the Sikh community. Gurbachan Singh had met Prime Minister Morarji Desai who gave him assurances; major Sikh leaders, including Jagdev Singh Talwandi and Gurcharan Singh Tohra, responded by telling the press and government not to meddle in the "internal affairs" of the Sikhs by commenting on hukamnamas.

== Incident ==
On 13 April 1978, the day to celebrate the birth of the Khalsa, a Sant Nirankari convention headed by their leader Gurbachan Singh was organized in Amritsar, with permission from the Akali-led State Government of Punjab. While the original Nirankaris, founded in the nineteenth century with a focus on mysticism, coexisted peacefully with mainstream Sikh tradition despite its differences, the practices of the "Sant Nirankaris" subsect were considered heretical by the orthodox Sikhism expounded by Bhindranwale, as they had begun to revere their new founder and successors as gurus and added their own scriptures to the Guru Granth Sahib, the Sikh holy book which is considered as the eternal guru, with Gurbachan Singh comparing himself to Guru Gobind Singh, saying that he would create the "sat sitārās" (seven stars) to complement the Panj Piare. The government's approval of the new sect's convention in Amritsar in 1978 was particularly galling to orthodox Sikhs, as it fell on 13 April, the founding day of the Khalsa; some felt that the entire Sant Nirankari episode had been provoked on purpose by the central government to destabilize and disunify Sikhs, given its sudden rapid growth in the 1960s, and the unusual composition of converts to the sect, with a preponderance of either gazetted officers and deputy commissioners that could allot land, and the extremely poor as followers they attracted with their wealth, meant that the breakaway sect was being manipulated to undercut the power of Sikhism in the state by the central government at the time, part of what was believed to be constant attempts to "divide and destroy" Sikhism.

An amassed Nirankari procession of "50,000-100,000" people passed throughout the city in the morning. From the Golden Temple premises, Bhindranwale delivered a sermon in which he declared that he would not allow this convention. A procession of about two hundred Sikhs led by Bhindranwale of the Damdami Taksal and Fauja Singh, an agricultural inspector and a leader of the Akhand Kirtani Jatha, which had been founded by Randhir Singh, who had been active in the Ghadr and independence movements and had been imprisoned by the British during that period, left the Golden Temple, heading towards the Sant Nirankari Convention. A shopkeeper's arm was cut on the way to the Sant Nirankari venue.

According to eyewitness accounts, the group, mostly men and joined by women who had refused the advice to stay back, headed out of the Darbar Sahib after an ardas and commitment to nonviolence. They were walked by Bhindranwale to the gates, where he was requested to not join, as he would be needed to lead in the event of casualties. Later, as the pressure from the congregation mounted amid slogan-shouting, Bhindranwale offered to go to the site of the convention in order to protest against "the anti-Sikh utterances of their leaders, but was dissuaded from doing so by some well-wishers." The local police assigned to the Sant Nirankaris met the protesters and asked them to wait there, as they would go speak to the Sant Nirankaris about their controversial program. The police would return with armed Sant Nirankaris directly behind them, and in the ensuing melee, the police fired selectively at the Sikh protesters, killing several unarmed men as well as hitting Fauja Singh, who according to KPS Gill (who was not present) attempted to behead Sant Nirankari guru Gurbachan Singh with his sword but was shot dead by Gurbachan's bodyguard. In the ensuing violence, several people were killed: two of Bhindranwale's followers, eleven members of the Akhand Kirtani Jatha and two Sant Nirankaris. According to Kirpal Dhillon, former DGP of Punjab, the reported participation of some senior Punjab government officials in the convention also may have emboldened the Sant Nirankaris to initiate the attack; later police investigations revealed that the attack on the Sikhs was led by a man on horseback with armed attackers, taking place some 250-400 yards away from the venue.

Fauja Singh died as he was being rushed to the hospital, and the cremation of Fauja Singh and the 12 other Sikhs occurred in a large ceremony attended by tens of thousands; the photos of his maimed body, with a bullet wound in his left eye, spread along with the news of the death quickly. This event brought Bhindranwale to limelight in the media.

== Aftermath ==
Cremation of the remains of the 13 martyred Sikhs

=== Case ===
A criminal case was filed against sixty two Sant Nirankaris, charged with the murder of 13 Sikhs, by the Akali-led government in Punjab, who also assembled a special investigation team to pursue the criminal case. The investigation concluded that the attack on the Sikhs was planned by a number of accused, including Gurbachan Singh, all of whom were taken into custody except for Gurbachan Singh himself, who was arrested later in Delhi only after being permitted a personal audience with the Prime Minister Morarji Desai. The investigation also concluded that the attack on the Sikhs was premediated in pursuance of a conspiracy, which involved the permitting such a provocative convention by the district magistrate at such a sensitive venue, possibly by outside pressure; the deputy commissioner of neighboring Gurdaspur district was a Sant Nirankari, as was probably the state chief secretary, and likely many other politicians and bureaucrats in Chandigarh and Delhi who were interested in aggravating conflict situations.

The case was heard in the neighbouring Haryana state, and all the accused were acquitted on grounds of self-defence on 4 January 1980, two days before the Lok Sabha poll. Though the case failed as authorities in Punjab were unable to ensure that the prosecution witness remained uncompromised by interested parties and police in Karnal, the Chief Minister of Punjab Prakash Singh Badal decided not to appeal the decision; fearing partiality in a Punjab court, Gurbachan Singh had gotten his case transferred to Karnal, which fell outside the state. The state government under Darbara Singh of Congress also declined to file the appeal against the acquittal, though the prosecution had developed a well-reasoned case for it. The Sant Nirankaris received support from the media, who portrayed the incident as "inter-sect wars" and proof of rising Sikh orthodoxy, and Desai put the entire blame on the Sikhs; orthodox Sikhs saw this as an attempt to manipulate the sect as a way to undercut Sikhism in Punjab. The government's apathy towards apprehending the perpetrators also caused outrage among the Sikhs, with the ruling Akalis accused of shielding them.

The testimony of Lala Jagat Narain, that the Sikhs had died in police firing, proved essential in influencing the case against the prosecution's theory. Even before the incident, he had consistently supported the Sant Nirankari cause, in addition to having a history of consistently opposing the Panjabi language being adopted as a medium of instruction in Hindu schools, or as an official language of Panjab, leading the 1951 and 1961 efforts to have the state's Hindus declare Hindi, not Panjabi, as their mother tongue in censuses during the Punjabi Suba movement, writing "scurrilously" not only against Sikh aspirations and the Anandpur Sahib Resolution, but casting aspersions on the loyalty of the majority of Sikhs, and wanting "extreme measures" taken against them. Bhindranwale would come to speak frequently against him.

=== Hukamnama ===
The Akal Takht issued a hukamnama in June 1978 to the Sikh community that they should have no connection with the Sant Nirankaris and disapprove of their heterodoxy, citing Gurbachan Singh's claims to be an avatar and encouraging others to turn away from the shabad guru (the Guru Granth Sahib) to preach the worship of a human being, enjoining Sikhs to sever all social ties with "those Sikhs who have become a part and parcel of this hypocritical and heterodox so-called Nirankari organization and with their leader, Gurbachan Singh". They further directed Sikhs to use "all appropriate means" to prevent the Sant Nirankaris from "grow[ing] and flourish[ing] in society".

While the Akalis and the Sikhs in general were content to invoke legal and social sanctions, the death of unarmed protesters had strongly affected the Sikhs, including those formerly apolitical, against the "Nirankari onslaught on the Sikhs." Others sought revenge upon the Nirankaris and officials connected with the incident by other means, including an offshoot of the Akhand Kirtani Jatha called the Babbar Khalsa, led by Bibi Amarjit Kaur, the widow of the leader of the march in Amritsar, Fauja Singh; a council of five called the Dal Khalsa, formed with the object of demanding a sovereign Sikh state; and the All India Sikh Students Federation. Bhindranwale declared that since the government had failed to deliver justice for the 13 slain Sikhs, that the killers would be brought to justice by other means.

Amidst growing disillusionment with the Akali Dal at their perceived ineffectiveness at safeguarding Sikh religious and political interests, even while being the dominant partner in the state's coalition government, as well as their general corruption and the poor quality of their jathedars who controlled the party structure from the district level down, Bhindranwale would come to speak for Sikh sentiments of the injustice meted out in the wake of the clash, strongly voicing Sikh demands and aspirations, proving to fulfill his vows. The Akalis would come to be portrayed by him as complicit in standing against the panth, alongside the Sant Nirankaris, the state with "its repressive mechanisms and ideological biases, and the Hind Samachar group for its "communal and anti-Sikh orientation and writings."

=== Later clashes ===
The same Thursday in Amritsar, 250 armed Nihang Sikhs went to a Sant Nirankari conference to "persuade the rival group not to hold the conference" there, according to the Akali Dal, as their teachings were "against the tenets of Sikhism." This was denied by a Nirankari spokesman in Delhi, who described the Akali Dal as "jealous" of the Nirankaris' growth. In the ensuing clash, 28 people were killed and more than 140 were injured.

Subsequently, Sant Nirankari bhawans were gheraoed, or sieged. In Kanpur on September 26, 1978, A group of 500 Sikhs armed with guns, swords and spears attacked a Sant Nirankari bhawan. According to police reports, the Sikhs had set fire to the tents outside the venue and forcibly entered the meeting hall. In this clash more than a dozen Sikhs were killed in firing by police. In November 1978, another clash occurred in Kanpur after Akali Sikhs, armed with weapons, protested against a three-day Nirankari convention. The police were compelled to disperse the rioters with tear gas and rifle shots after they had attacked the police with swords.

The SGPC and the Akali Dal further called for a ban on Sant Nirankari religious books and the Punjab government outlawed Gurbachan Singh's entry in the state, an order later annulled by the Supreme Court of India in January 1979. Between 1981 and 1984, there were more than 34 gun and bomb attacks perpetrated against the Sant Nirankaris.

On 24 April 1980, the Sant Nirankari guru, Gurbachan Singh was assassinated. Several of Bhindranwale's associates and relatives were arrested. The FIR named nearly twenty people involved in the murder, claimed to have had ties to Bhindranwale. A member of the Akhand Kirtani Jatha, Ranjit Singh, surrendered and admitted to the assassination three years later, and was sentenced to serve thirteen years at the Tihar Jail in Delhi, spending 12 years in jail as an under-trial from 1984 to 1996. Ranjit Singh was later appointed head priest of Akal Takht, a development "not unusual" as this was how the community traditionally demonstrated its appreciation for avenging wrongs when the state failed to do so. Several other members of Sant Nirankari Mission were also killed later. The Babbar Khalsa, who opposed Bhindranwale, claimed responsibility for the killings of Sant Nirankaris, claiming 35 from 1981 to 1983.

== Legacy ==
Portrait photographs of the thirteen killed Sikhs of the 1978 Sikh–Nirankari clash. Their identities are as follows (from left-to-right): Top row - Kewal Singh, Fauja Singh, Raghbir Singh Middle row - Hari Singh, Avtar Singh, Piara Singh, Harbhajan Singh, Ranbir Singh Bottom row - Gurcharan Singh, Darshan Singh, Amreek Singh, Gurdial Singh, Dharambir Singh

Gurdwara Shaheed Ganj, Amritsar was raised in the memory of the 13 Sikhs killed in the clash.

Satpal Baghi of Ferozepur in the Indian Express, notes:

The genesis of the real trouble between the Nirankaris and Akalis goes back to the years when Mrs. Indira Gandhi headed the Union Government. She wanted to weaken the Shiromani Akali Dal, but found that Akalis could not be brought to heel. She thought of an elaborate plan to strengthen the Nirankari sect not only in Punjab but throughout the country and abroad. Official patronage was extended to the Nirankaris, much to the chagrin of Akalis who have always considered the Nirankaris as heretics."
"In pursuit of this policy of divide and rule, Mrs. Gandhi personally gave clearance for a diplomatic passport to be issued to the Nirankari Chief and the Indian High Commissioners and Ambassadors abroad were instructed to show him respect and regard. This was meant to help the sect to improve its image and increase its following abroad. During Mrs. Gandhi's regime, the Nirankaris were known to be receiving financial help from secret Government funds, not open to audit or scrutiny by Parliament."
"During Emergency the recalcitrant attitude of the Akalis further annoyed Mrs. Gandhi and Mr. Sanjay Gandhi. Efforts for building a parallel organisation among the Sikhs of Punjab as a counterblast to the Akalis were intensified. At the insistence of Mrs. Gandhi, the Congress regime began giving great official patronage to the Nirankari sect. Mr. H.S. Chhina. I.A.S. a staunch Nirankari, was appointed Chief Secretary to the Punjab Government, in 1976."'
"As a result of open official patronage and support, this sect got a considerable boost within the administrative set-up of the Punjab Government. Mr. Chhina appointed Mr. Niranjan Singh, I.A.S., as deputy commissioner of Gurdaspur. Mr. Niranjan Singh tried his best to enlarge the field of operation of the Nirankaris. It is during this period that Sant Bhindranwale took up the challenge posed by this growing sect.'"

Tavleen Singh wrote:

"Contrary to the popular belief that he took the offensive, senior police sources in the Punjab admit that the provocation came in fact from a Nirankari official who started harassing Bhindranwale and his men.
There were two or three Nirankaris in key positions in the Punjab in those days and they were powerful enough to be able to create quite a lot of trouble. The Nirankaris also received patronage from Delhi that made Sikh organizations like Bhindranwale's and the Akhand Kirtani Jatha, headed then by Bibi Amarjit Kaur's husband, Fauja Singh, hate them even more."

Khushwant Singh wrote:

"Terrorist activity preceded the morcha [("movement")] by more than six months and was born out of encounters faked by the Punjab police and the armed conflict between the Nirankaris and Sant Bhindranwale beginning April 13, 1978".

== Bibliography ==
- Sandhu, Ranbir Singh (1999). Struggle for Justice: Speeches and Conversations of Sant Jarnail Singh Khalsa Bhindranwale (1st ed.). Dublin, Ohio, U.S.A.: Sikh Educational & Religious Foundation. ISBN 9780967287416.
- Dhillon, Gurdarshan Singh (1996). Truth about Punjab: SGPC White Paper (1st ed.). Amritsar, Punjab: Shiromani Gurdwara Parbandhak Committee. p. xxx. ISBN 978-0836456547.
- Mahmood, Cynthia Keppley (1996). Fighting for Faith and Nation: Dialogues with Sikh Militants. Philadelphia, Pennsylvania, U.S.A.: University of Pennsylvania Press. ISBN 978-0812215922.
