= Fauja =

Fauja is a masculine given name. Notable people with this name include:

- Fauja Singh Sarari, Indian MLA
- Fauja Singh (Sikh leader) (1936–1978)
- Fauja Singh (died 2025), Indian marathon runner
