= Baba Dyal Singh =

Sikh religious reformer

Baba Dyal Singh Nirankari
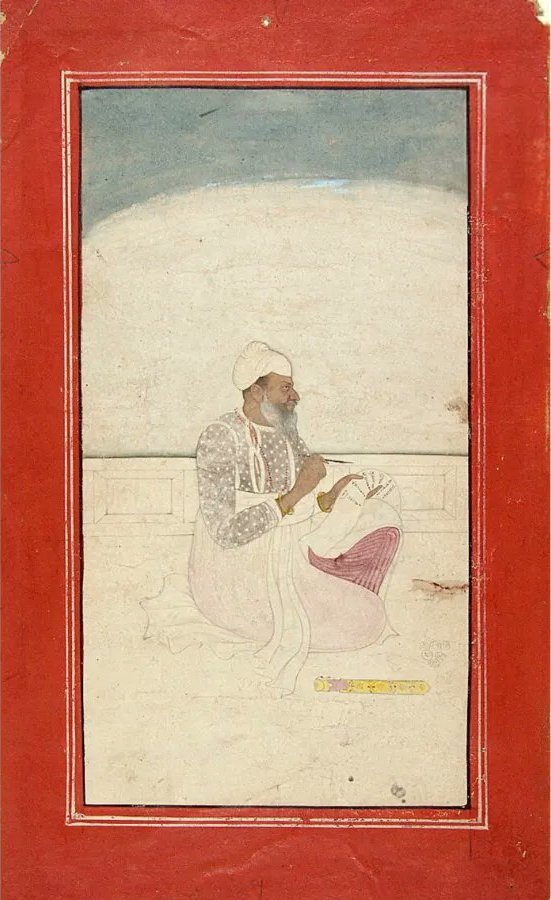
- Miniature painting thought to depict Baba Dyal Singh, circa 19th century
- Title: Leader of the Nirankari sect

Personal life
- Born: 1783 Peshawar
- Died: 1855 (aged 71–72)
- Spouse: Mul Devi
- Parent(s): Ram Sahai (father); Ladikki (mother)
- Known for: Founder of the Nirankari sect of Sikhism

Religious life
- Religion: Sikhism
- Sect: Nirankari; Asli Nirankari

Religious career
- Based in: Dayalsar, Rawalpindi
- Post: Nirankari Guru
- Predecessor: none (position established)
- Successor: Baba Darbara Singh

Baba Dayal (17 May 1783 – 30 January 1855), also spelt as Baba Dyal, was a non-Khalsa, Sahajdhari Sikh reformer whose main mission was to bring Sikhs back to the Adi Granth and Simran. He was the founder of the Nirankari sect of Sikhism.

== Early life ==
Dyal Singh was born in Peshawar on 17 May 1783 and was the son of a banker named Ram Sahai and Ladikki, daughter of Vasakha Singh of Rohtas. His father died while he was a baby. Growing up, he was educated in Gurmukhi, Persian, and Pashto.

== Religious career ==
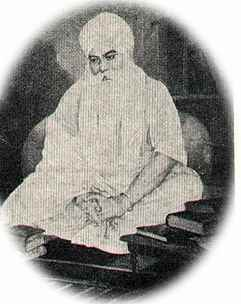
Posthumous depiction of Baba Dyal Singh Nirankari

After the death of his mother in 1802, he moved to Rawalpindi, where he worked as a grocer. It is during this time that his religious preaching began to the local Sikh congregations at two gurdwaras. At the age of 18, it is claimed he heard a voice inside his head telling him to preach against ritualism, expel the darkness of ignorance, and that he was the true Nirankari. This event is taken as a sign of enlightenment. His message was that ritualism and practices, which had been firmly spurned by the Sikh gurus, were seeping back into the religion again, much to his dismay. One of the things he spoke out against the most was the use of images as a means of worship, as he believed this was against the Sikh tenet of the Divine being Nirankar (meaning "formless" or "shapeless"). During the rise of the Sikh Empire, many Hindu practices had entered into Sikhism, which may have spurned his reaction against such practices. Thus, him and his growing group of followers became known as the Nirankaris. His own marriage in the year 1808 may have been the first recorded instance of the now-mainstream Sikh wedding tradition, known as the Lavan and Anand. This act was revolutionary as he did not invite a Brahmin priest to the wedding and instead chose verses of the Sikh scripture, Guru Granth Sahib, to be read out during the occasion. Dyal was also against gross displays of personal wealth by the upper-classes of Sikh society, such as by royals. He reiterated the Sikh teaching of Kirat Karo, or honest living. He also had aniconistic ideals as he was against the use of idols as a means of worship. He was against the worship of Indic deities by Sikhs. He promoted filial piety, where children revered and respected their begetter. He was anti-narcotics and was opposed to the use of intoxicants. He preferred simple and humble religious ceremonies rather than profligate ones. He promoted naam simran and naam japna as a vital practice for Sikhs. He preached about the centrality of the holy scripture, the Guru Granth Sahib, as the focus and aim for Sikhs to direct themselves spiritually towards and the importance of its message. He did not preach nor practice renunciation. Most of his followers were shopkeepers and traders.

After being refused entry to one of his local gurdwaras he was known to preach at due to his controversial teachings, he decided to establish his own durbar (court) by purchasing land and constructing a small structure there. It is said that Ranjit Singh of the Sikh Empire once visited him.

His sect was opposed by the Bedi descendents of Guru Nanak and the Brahmin caste.

On investigation... it was found that the whole movement was the result of the efforts of an individual to establish a new panth (religious sect) of which he should be the instructor and guide. The sect has been in existence eight or nine years, but during the Sikh reign, fear kept them quiet; since the extension of the Company's Government over the country, they have become more bold, and with the assistance of our religious publications to furnish them with arguments against idolatry, they have attacked the faith of the Hindus most fiercely. They professedly reject idolatry, and all reverence and respect for whatever is held sacred by Sikhs or Hindus, except Nanak and his Granth... The Hindus complain that they even give abuse to the cow. This climax of impiety could not be endured, and it was followed by some street disturbances, which brought the parties into the civil courts.. They are called Nirankaris, from their belief in God, as a spirit without bodily form. The next great fundamental principle of their religion is that salvation is to be obtained by meditation on God. They regard Nanak as their saviour, in as much as he taught them the way of salvation. Of their peculiar practices only two things are learned. First, they assemble every morning for worship, which consists of bowing the head to the ground before the Granth, making offerings, and in hearing the Granth read by one of their numbers, and explained also if their leader be present. Secondly, they do not burn their dead, because that would assimilate them to the Hindus; nor bury them, because that would make them too much like Christians and Musulmans, but throw them into the river.

— Annual Report of the Lodiana [Ludhiana] Mission (1853), a Christian missionary group, describing the sect founded by Baba Dyal

== Death and successor ==
Dyal died on 30 January 1855 and his eldest son, Darbara Singh, succeeded him as leader of the Nirankari sect and whom responsible for collecting and recording his father's teachings. His successor spread the teachings of the sect outside of the Rawalpindi area.
