= Hardev Singh =

Baba Hardev Singh Ji Maharaj

Satguru Baba Hardev Singh Ji Maharaj
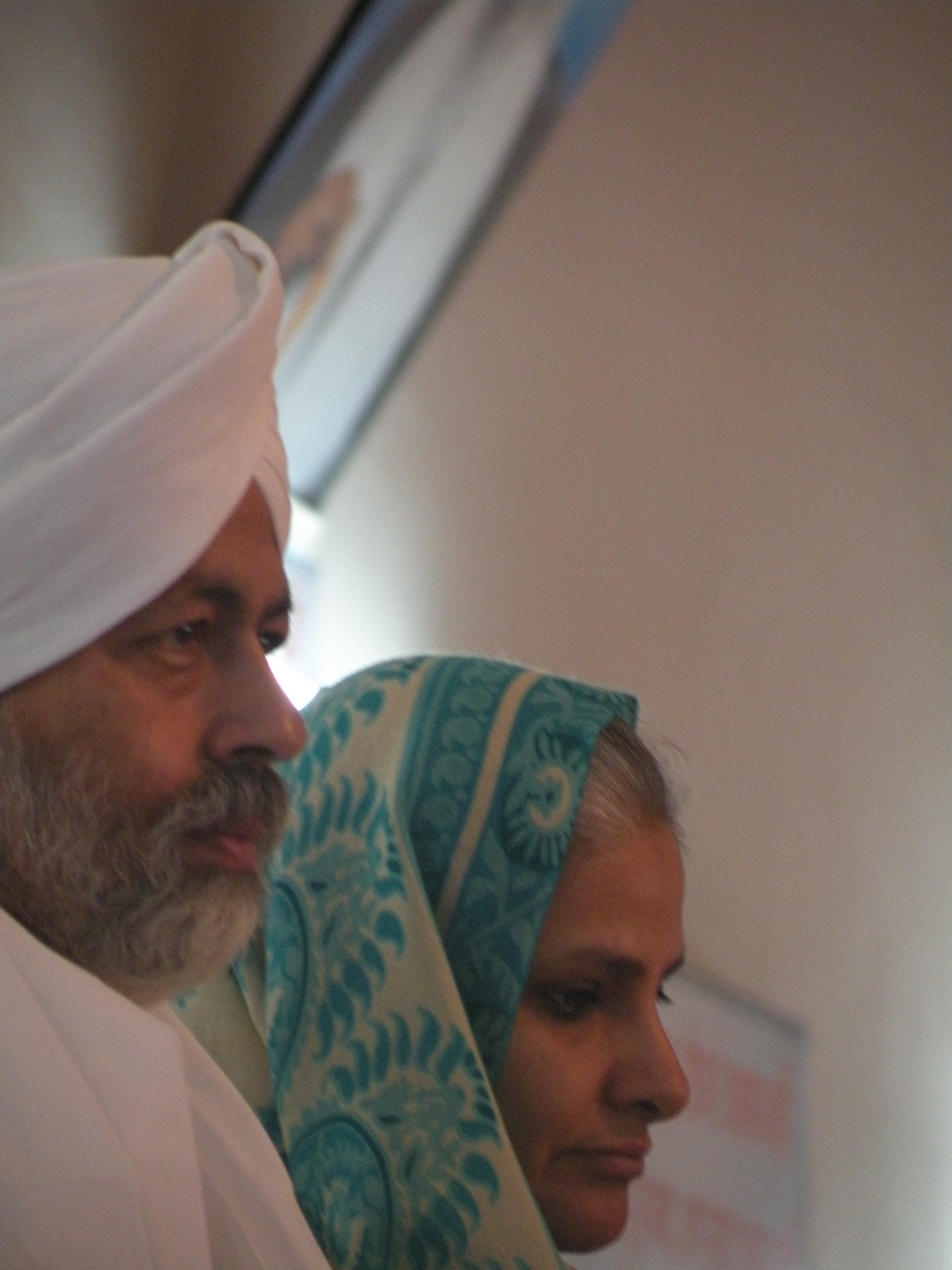
- Hardev Singh with his wife Savinder Kaur in 2011
- Title: 4th Satguru of the Sant Nirankari Mission

Personal life
- Born: 23 February 1954 Delhi, India
- Died: 13 May 2016 (aged 62) Beauharnois, Quebec, Canada
- Spouse: Savinder Kaur (m. 1975–2016)
- Children: 3, including Sudiksha
- Parents: Gurbachan Singh (father); Kulwant Kaur (mother)
- Other names: Nirankari Baba, Nirankari Baba Ji
- Occupation: Head of the Sant Nirankari Mission (1980–2016)

Religious life
- Religion: Sant Nirankari Mission

Senior posting
- Period in office: 1980-2016
- Predecessor: Gurbachan Singh
- Successor: Savinder Kaur

Hardev Singh (23 February 1954 – 13 May 2016), also known as Nirankari Baba, was an Indian spiritual leader and satguru of the Sant Nirankari Mission from 1980 until his death.

== Early life and education ==
Hardev Singh was born on 23 February 1954 to Gurbachan Singh and Kulwant Kaur in Delhi. He completed his elementary education from Yadvindra public school, Patiala, Punjab and later schooling from Rosary public school, Sant Nirankari Colony, Delhi. He graduated from Delhi University.

In 1975, he married Savinder Kaur during an annual Nirankari Sant Samagam in Delhi.

== Spiritual career ==
Hardev Singh became a member of the Nirankari Seva Dal in 1971. After the assassination of his father Gurbachan Singh, who headed the Sant Nirankari Mission in 1980, he succeeded as the chief leader (satguru) of the organization. In 2005, he established the Nirankari Museum in Sant Nirankari Sarovar complex in New Delhi. Sant Nirankari Mission was established in 1929, by Buta Singh who previously belonged to the Nirankari sect. He was succeeded by Avtar Singh. The mission flourished after it shifted base to Delhi from West Punjab, after partition of India in 1947. As of 2016, the organization has 2000 centers and millions of followers all over the globe.

== Death ==
Hardev Singh died on 13 May 2016 in a car accident on Autoroute 30 near Montreal, Quebec, Canada. Indian President Pranab Mukherjee, Prime Minister Narendra Modi, Home minister Rajnath Singh, and Congress leader Sonia Gandhi among others expressed their grief over his death. He was cremated on 18 May 2016 at Nigambodh Ghat crematorium in Delhi.

On 17 May 2016, Hardev Singh's wife Savinder Kaur became the fifth chief leader of the mission.

== Bibliography ==
- J. R. D. Satyarthi (1988). Gurudev Hardev (Biography). Sant Nirankari Mandal.
- Shiri Ram Bakshi; Sangh Mittra (2002). Saints of India: Sant Nirankari Baba. Criterion. ISBN 9788179380123.
- Hardev Singh; Jaganath Sharma (2011). Stream of Thoughts. Sant Nirankari Mandal.
