= Jhanda Bagga Nawan =

- village
- Location in Punjab, India Jhanda Bagga Nawan (India)
- Coordinates: 31.0425656°N 75.0932352°E
- Country: India
- State: Punjab
- District: Firozpur
- Tehsil: Zira
- Elevation: 211 m (692 ft)

Population (2011)
  - Total: 744
- Time zone: UTC+5:30 (IST)
- 2011 census code: 34223

Jhanda Bagga Nawan is a village in the Firozpur district of Punjab, India. It is located in the Zira tehsil.

== Demographics ==
According to the 2011 census of India, Jhanda Bagga Nawan has 132 households. The effective literacy rate (i.e. the literacy rate of population excluding children aged 6 and below) is 66.51%.

Demographics (2011 Census)
	Total	Male	Female
Population	744	388	356
Children aged below 6 years	87	42	45
Scheduled caste	205	104	101
Scheduled tribe	0	0	0
Literates	437	252	185
Workers (all)	211	204	7
Main workers (total)	206	200	6
Main workers: Cultivators	135	133	2
Main workers: Agricultural labourers	51	50	1
Main workers: Household industry workers	5	5	0
Main workers: Other	15	12	3
Marginal workers (total)	5	4	1
Marginal workers: Cultivators	0	0	0
Marginal workers: Agricultural labourers	3	3	0
Marginal workers: Household industry workers	1	1	0
Marginal workers: Others	1	0	1
Non-workers	533	184	349
