= Madho Jhanda =

- Village
- Location in Punjab, India Madho Jhanda (India)
- Coordinates: 31.327896°N 75.372006°E
- Country: India
- State: Punjab
- District: Kapurthala

Government
  - Type: Panchayati raj (India)
  - Body: Gram panchayat

Population (2011)
  - Total: 650
- Sex ratio 320/330♂/♀

Languages
  - Official: Punjabi
  - Other spoken: English
- Time zone: UTC+5:30 (IST)
- PIN: 144620
- Telephone code: 01822
- ISO 3166 code: IN-PB
- Vehicle registration: PB-09
- Website: kapurthala.gov.in

Madho Jhanda is a village in the Kapurthala district of Punjab State, India. It is located 8 kilometres (5.0 mi) from Kapurthala, the district and sub-district headquarters. The village is administrated by a Sarpanch, an elected representative of the village according to the constitution of India and Panchayati raj (India). There are a number of religious sites in the village, including Gurudwara Sahib Baba Sandhiya Das Ji, and Darbar Peer Baba Lakh Data Sahib Ji Sarkar, Madho Jhanda.

== Demography ==
According to a 2011 report published by Census India, Madho Jhanda has a total of 129 houses and a population of 650, including 320 males and 330 females. The Literacy rate of Madho Jhanda is 69.04%, lower than the state average of 75.84%. The population of children under the age of 6 years is 75, which is 11.54% of the total population, and the child sex ratio is approximately 705, lower than the state average of 846.

== Population data ==
Particulars	Total	Male	Female
Total No. of Houses	129	-	-
Population	650	320	330
Child (0-6)	75	44	31
Schedule Caste	233	118	115
Schedule Tribe	0	0	0
Literacy	69.04 %	73.19 %	65.22 %
Total Workers	190	167	23
Main Worker	189	0	0
Marginal Worker	1	1	0

== Air travel connectivity ==
The closest airport to the village is Sri Guru Ram Dass Jee International Airport.
