= Sudiksha (Sant Nirankari mission) =

Indian spiritual leader (born 1985)

Satguru Mata Sudiksha Ji Maharaj
- Title: 6th Satguru of Sant Nirankari Mission

Personal life
- Born: Sudiksha Nirankari; 13 March 1985 (age 41) India
- Spouse: Avneet Setya (m. 2015; died 2016); Ramit Chandana (m. 2017)
- Parents: Hardev Singh (father); Mata Savinder Hardev (mother)
- Other name: Sudiksha Bajaj
- Occupation: Head of the Sant Nirankari Mission (2018–)

Religious life
- Religion: Sant Nirankari Mission

Senior posting
- Period in office: 2018–present
- Predecessor: Savinder Hardev

Sudiksha Savinder Hardev (born 13 March 1985), better known simply as Sudiksha is an Indian spiritual leader and sixth and current Satguru of the Sant Nirankari Mission, a position held by both her parents.

== Background ==
=== Early life ===
Sudiksha was born to Hardev Singh (1954-2016) and Savinder Hardev on March 13, 1985. She is the youngest of three children. Her father was the fourth Sat Guru of the Sant Nirankari Mission, and her mother was the fifth.

== Satguru ==
Sudiksha was appointed as the head of the Sant Nirankari Mission in 2018 after her mother Satguru Mata Savinder Hardev's health deteriorated. Her father and husband tragically died the year before in a car accident whilst visiting devotees in Canada.

In 2019, Satguru Mata Sudiksha Ji Maharaj attended a three-day Nirankari Youth Symposium in the UK and met civic leaders in Sandwell. She also gave her first talk to her Indian followers in Pathankot in the same year and inaugurated a mega blood donation camp in Delhi.

In 2021 she provided a virtual new year message to her followers and promoted human values at the 54th Nirankari conference held in Maharashtra.

In 2023 she conveyed a message of loving humanity and in 2025 she has emphasized that the true purpose of life is not limited to material accomplishments but lies in spiritual upliftment and organised a mass marriage ceremony for 126 couples.

=== Awards and recognitions ===
In 2019, Satguru Mata Sudiksha Ji Maharaj received an Honorary Citizenship of Blacktown, Australia.
