= Gurbachan Singh =

Religious figure and third Guru of the Sant Nirankari mission

Satguru Baba Gurbachan Singh Ji Maharaj
- Official portrait
- Title: 3rd Satguru of Sant Nirankari Mission

Personal life
- Born: 10 December 1930
- Died: 24 April 1980 (aged 49)
- Spouse: Kulwant Kaur
- Children: Hardev Singh
- Parents: Avtar Singh (father); Budhwanti (mother)
- Occupation: Head of the Sant Nirankari Mission (1962–1980)

Religious life
- Religion: Sant Nirankari Mission

Senior posting
- Period in office: 1962-1980
- Predecessor: Avtar Singh
- Successor: Hardev Singh

Gurbachan Singh (10 December 1930 – 24 April 1980) was the third satguru of the Sant Nirankari mission, considered to be heterodox by mainstream Sikhs. He was born in Peshawar (modern-day Pakistan). He was declared next Satguru by his father and predecessor Baba Avtar Singh in 1962. He was assassinated in 1980 following a clash with Sikh fundamentalists.

== Early life ==
Gurbachan Singh was born to Avtar Singh and his wife Budhwanti. He completed his middle school education in Peshawar, and then matriculated from the Khalsa School in Rawalpindi. He had to abandon his higher studies due to the violence during the partition of India in 1947. He married Kulwant Kaur, the daughter of Bhai Manna Singh, 22 April 1947.

In 1947, the Singh family migrated from the present-day Pakistan to present-day India. Gurbachan Singh established an auto parts business, first in Jalandhar and then in Delhi. Later, he started taking interest in the congregations of his father.

Gurbachan Singh was declared as the next satguru by his father on 3 December 1962 at Paharganj in Delhi. At the two conferences of the mission in Mussoorie (1965 and 1973), he made important changes to the organisation and established a code of conduct.

== Clashes with orthodox Sikhs ==
In 1978, the Sant Nirankari Mission from Delhi and other parts of the Indian sub-continent gathered a congregation at Amritsar. A clash would soon erupt between orthodox Sikh groups and the Sant Nirankaris, although the cause and instigator of the clash is disputed and unclear. The orthodox Sikhs had a negative perception of the Sant Nirankaris due to perceived "offences" committed against their religion, remarks made, and the Sant Nirankari practice of a dehdhari guru (living/physical human guru), which mainstream Sikhs ceased to follow since the death of Guru Gobind Singh. Furthermore, mainline Sikhs were vexed by the Sant Nirankari practice of devotees touching the feet of the Nirankari guru, Avtar Singh, in the presence of the Guru Granth Sahib. A SGPC white-paper authored by Kapur Singh charges Avtar Singh with installing the Guru Granth Sahib on a lower platform than him, emulating Sikh practices, insulting the Sikh scripture, and a myriad of other issues which mainstream Sikhs interpreted very negatively. The SGPC claimed that the Sant Nirankari mission's aim was to absorb Sikhism into Hinduism and "mislead and beguile Sikhs", as part of a greater conspiracy orchestrated by the Congress party. The central issue was that Sikhs believed Gurbachan Singh had elevated himself to a position of authority higher than the Sikh scripture.

A few orthodox Sikhs of Akhand Kirtani Jatha and Damdami Taksal marched from the Darbar Sahib to protest the Nirankari congregation, whom they considered heterodox. In the resulting violence, 15 individuals including thirteen Khalsa Sikhs and two Sant Nirankaris were killed. The Jatha leader Bhai Fauja Singh was also among the Sikhs killed.

On 25 September 1978, Gurbachan Singh arrived in Kanpur. A group of protesters arrived at the Nirankari Bhawan to protest against his presence. On 28 September 1978, anticipating fresh trouble, the Punjab Government barred Nirankari Chief Gurbachan Singh from entering Punjab for six months. The Supreme Court later rescinded the ban.

On 6 October 1978, a Hukumnama by the Jathedar of the Akal Takht was issued, calling upon Sikhs to socially boycott the Nirankaris. The Nirankaris claimed to have been attacked by "fanatics" and that ensuing criminal cases against Nirankaris were "false cases".

== Death ==
In 1980, Ranjit Singh, a member of the Akhand Kirtani Jatha, managed to obtain employment at the Nirankari headquarters in Delhi as a carpenter. On the evening of 24 April 1980, he waited with an automatic rifle in a room of the guest house. Ranjit Singh and his accomplice Kabal Singh shot Gurbachan Singh through a window when he returned from a public function at about 11pm for justice against the 28 Sikhs he killed. Ranjit Singh managed to escape. The First Information Report named twenty people for the murder, including several known associates of Jarnail Singh Bhindranwale, who was also charged with conspiracy to commit murder. Ranjit Singh surrendered in 1983, and was in jail for 13 years. In 1990, while still in Tihar Jail, he was named the Akal Takht Jathedar, and took over the post when he was released in 1996. According to a Hindustan Times report, Ranjit Singh said about the murder: "I have no regrets. I did it for the Panth (religion)." In 1997, the Delhi High Court upheld his conviction and cancelled the bail. Ranjit Singh refused to surrender. The government quickly ordered a remission of his remaining sentence to avoid a confrontation.

Gurbachan Singh was succeeded by his son Hardev Singh.
