= Nirankari =

Sikh sect

Nirankari ਨਿਰੰਕਾਰੀ
Founder
- Dyal Singh

Regions with significant populations
- Punjab

Religions
- Sikhism

Languages
- Punjabi

Nirankari (Punjabi: ਨਿਰੰਕਾਰੀ, lit. "formless one") is a sect of Sikhism. It was a reform movement founded by Baba Dyal Das in northwest Punjab in 1851. He sought to restore the practices and beliefs of Sikhs back to what he believed were prevalent when Guru Nanak was alive. This movement emerged in the aftermath of the end of Sikh Empire and the Sikh history after Ranjit Singh's death.

Nirankaris strongly oppose representing the "formless" God with any image, and believe that the true Sikh faith is based on nam simaran (remembering and repeating God's name). They believe in living hereditary gurus from Baba Dyal Das lineage, and that the Sikh scripture is an open text to which the wisdom of their living gurus after Guru Gobind Singh can be added. Nirankaris believe that a human guru to interpret the scripture and guide Sikhs is a necessity.

Nirankaris consider themselves to be Sikhs, and a part of Sikh history. Originally based in regions near their darbar in Rawalpindi, during the 1947 partition of India, they chose to leave the newly created Muslim-dominant Pakistan and migrated en-masse to India. In 1958, they established a new darbar in Chandigarh. Nirankari Sikhs are settled across contemporary India, with communities found from Srinagar to Kolkata.

== History ==
The first half of the 19th-century saw Sikh power expanded with the Sikh Empire under Ranjit Singh. This strength was deeply admired and cherished by Sikhs.

The Nirankari sect was founded in 1851 by Baba Dyal, a Sahajdhari, who aimed at refocusing Sikhs on the Adi Granth – the Sikh scripture, and reform the beliefs and customs of the Sikhs. Baba Dyal's son and successor, Baba Darbar Singh, collected and recorded the Baba Dyal's essential teachings and established Nirankari communities outside of Rawalpindi. The Nirankari were estimated to number in the thousands by the time of the third leader of the movement, Sahib Rattaji (1870–1909). The Nirankari institution of biredars started, where the living Guru appointed his local representative to watch and lead local Nirankaris in distant towns and villages. The office of biredar has been a hereditary one in practice, states Webster.

In the 1891 Indian Census, 14,001 Hindus and 46,610 Sikhs identified themselves as Nirankaris. Under their fourth leader, Baba Gurdit Singh, some of the Nirankari took an interest in the Singh Sabha revivalist movement. The Nirankaris helped to bring the Anand Marriage Act of 1909 to the attention of the Sikh populace. The movement's fifth Guru, Sahib Hara Singh (1877–1971), started to reorganise the movement, and was later succeeded by his eldest son, Baba Gurbax Singh. Baba Jagdarshan Singh who succeeded Baba Gurbaksh Singh after his death in 1998, is the current Guru of the Nirankaris.

Nirankaris believe in a lineage of living Gurus, well beyond the ten accepted by Khalsa Sikhs. Like Khalsa, they too revere the Guru Granth Sahib, but consider it an open book to which the wisdom of the later and present-day living Gurus can be added.

The group later developed its own distinct spiritual movement. At the time of the partition of India in 1947, the Nirankari abandoned their center in Rawalpindi, which has since then been part of Pakistan, and established themselves on the Indian side of the partition.

== Divisions ==
There are two Nirankari groups, the Asli Nirankaris (meaning "true Nirankaris"), founded by Baba Dyal Singh, and the Nakali Nirankaris (meaning "fake Nirankaris"). Nakali Nirankari is a demeaning term to refer to the Sant Nirankari Mandal (or 'Sant Nirankari Mission') and to distinguish the aforementioned from the original Nirankari movement.

The founder of the derogatorily termed "Nakali Nirankaris" was Bhota Singh (Note: Also spelt as 'Buta Singh'.), who had been evicted from the original movement after being found drunk inside a gurdwara. Bhota Singh would later found the Sant Nirankari Mission after his eviction from the original movement. However, a disciple of Bhota Singh named Avtar Singh would claim to be a "guru" after Dayal Singh died, leading to differences emerging between mainstream Sikhs and the Sant Nirankari Mission offshoot. Avtar Singh's coming to leadership of the offshoot Sant Nirankaris is when the sub-sect began to diverge greatly from the original Nirankari sect of Sikhism.

John C.B. Webster believes that Avtar Singh should be viewed as the founder of the Sant Nirankari offshoot rather than Bhota Singh. He further states that Bhota Singh was not excommunicated from the Nirankari sect but rather was instructed to solve his issue of alcoholism before engaging in religious affairs publicly again.

== Beliefs ==
Baba Dayal believed that Sikh practices and rituals of life were unlike what they were when Guru Nanak was alive. He strongly rejected idolatry, the Khalsa stance against living Gurus, and the treatment of the Sikh scripture as a closed book. He believed that salvation can result from naam-simaran, or repetition of the divine Name. He started a Sikh reform movement in 1851 to correct the extant beliefs and practices. The key devotional practice was to repeat the formless God's name as the mantra, Dhan, Dhan Nirankar, meaning "Glory, glory to the Formless One". Their ardas differs from that of the Khalsa Sikhs. They invoke "Nirankar" instead of "Bhagauti", and include their tradition's list of living Gurus beyond Guru Gobind Singh. The early worship houses of Nirankaris were called dharamshala, rather than gurdwara.

Nirankari means "without form", and reflects their belief that God cannot be represented in any form and that true Sikh faith is based on nam simaran. Among the earliest Sikh reform movements, The Nirankaris condemned the growing idol worship, obeisance to living gurus and influence of Brahmanic ritual that had crept into the Sikh panth. Though not an initiated Khalsa, he urged Sikhs to return to their focus to a formless divine (nirankar) and described himself as a nirankari. Maharaja Ranjit Singh of the Sikh Empire was said to have appreciated his teachings.

Nirankari prohibit the consumption of alcohol and tobacco. They are vegetarians. The Nirankaris believe in very simple, inexpensive wedding ceremonies called "Anand", a term related to one found among Khalsa Sikhs. The Nirankari Sikhs dispose of their dead in rivers in contrast to burial or cremation.

One of the main differentiation of Nirankari from orthodox Sikh belief is the continuation of the line of human Gurus after Guru Gobind Singh, as they eventually reverted to treating their leaders as living Gurus or gods. Nirankaris therefore do not believe in the orthodox view that there were only ten living Gurus in Sikhism and the Guru Granth Sahib is a closed scripture and that last Guru of Sikhism. They revere the Guru Granth Sahib, but also have living Gurus (satguru) that they revere and who sits near the scripture.

=== Nirankari Hukamnama ===
A 19th-century document in the Nirankari Sikh tradition is called the "Nirankari Hukamnama". This Hukamnama was issued by the eldest son of Baba Dayal, Baba Darbara Singh, the group's satguru between 1855 and 1870. It states that "Sri Satguru Dayal" personally visited God where he also met the ten Gurus of Sikhs who had assembled with God in his realm to meet with him. God ordered Dayal to go preach rituals and customs to the Sikhs. God told Dayal, according to the Hukamnama, that Sikhs who follow Dayal would go to heaven, while Sikhs who follow Brahmins are on the path to hell. This text describes the Nirankari Sikh ceremonies associated with birth, wedding and death. It also affirms the Anand ceremony as well as includes rituals associated with the throwing of a dead human body wrapped in white cloth into the river. The Hukamnama outlines distinctly Nirankari Sikh rituals, rejects both Hindu and Muslim rituals.

== Baba Dyal Singh ==
Baba Dyal Singh (1783–1855) lived during a period of Sikh dominance, resulting from the victories of the Sikh Maharaja Ranjit Singh. However, Baba Dyal felt that the military successes were a distraction of the Sikh duty to remember Akal Purakh through the practice of Naam Japo. Baba Dyal further preached against the assimilation of other religious traditions into Sikhism. Namely, he was concerned that the Hindu practice of idolatry was becoming increasingly prevalent in Sikhism, and thus Baba Dyal emphasised the formless, or ni ran kar, quality of Akal Purakh, which gave the movement its name.

Baba Dyal reportedly experienced enlightenment when he was 18 years old, entered meditation, and heard a voice saying:

Give up this ritualistic practice. You have been commissioned to expel the darkness of ignorance... You are a true Nirankari, as you are a believer of God as spirit, without bodily form.

Baba Dyal's movement was originally confined to the Rawalpindi area, with followers being mostly Sahajdhari Sikhs of the Khatri and Arora castes. However, his followers were not expected to surrender their occupations and live a life of renunciation. The Nirankari were typically traders and shopkeepers and were expected to continue working while they focused their attention on the remembrance of the divine Name.

Baba Dyal left a brief manual of instruction.' Its form and contents are those of a Rahit Nama, or law code. Its contents emphasise the teachings of Guru Nanak without mentioning the Khalsa of Guru Gobind Singh. The essence of the Nirankari Hukamnama is contained in the words which every adherent is commanded to utter again and again, Dhan than ni ran kar, meaning "Glory be to Nirankar."

== See also ==
- Ravidassia
- Ahmadiyya
