= Sant Nirankari Mission =

Religious organisation based in India

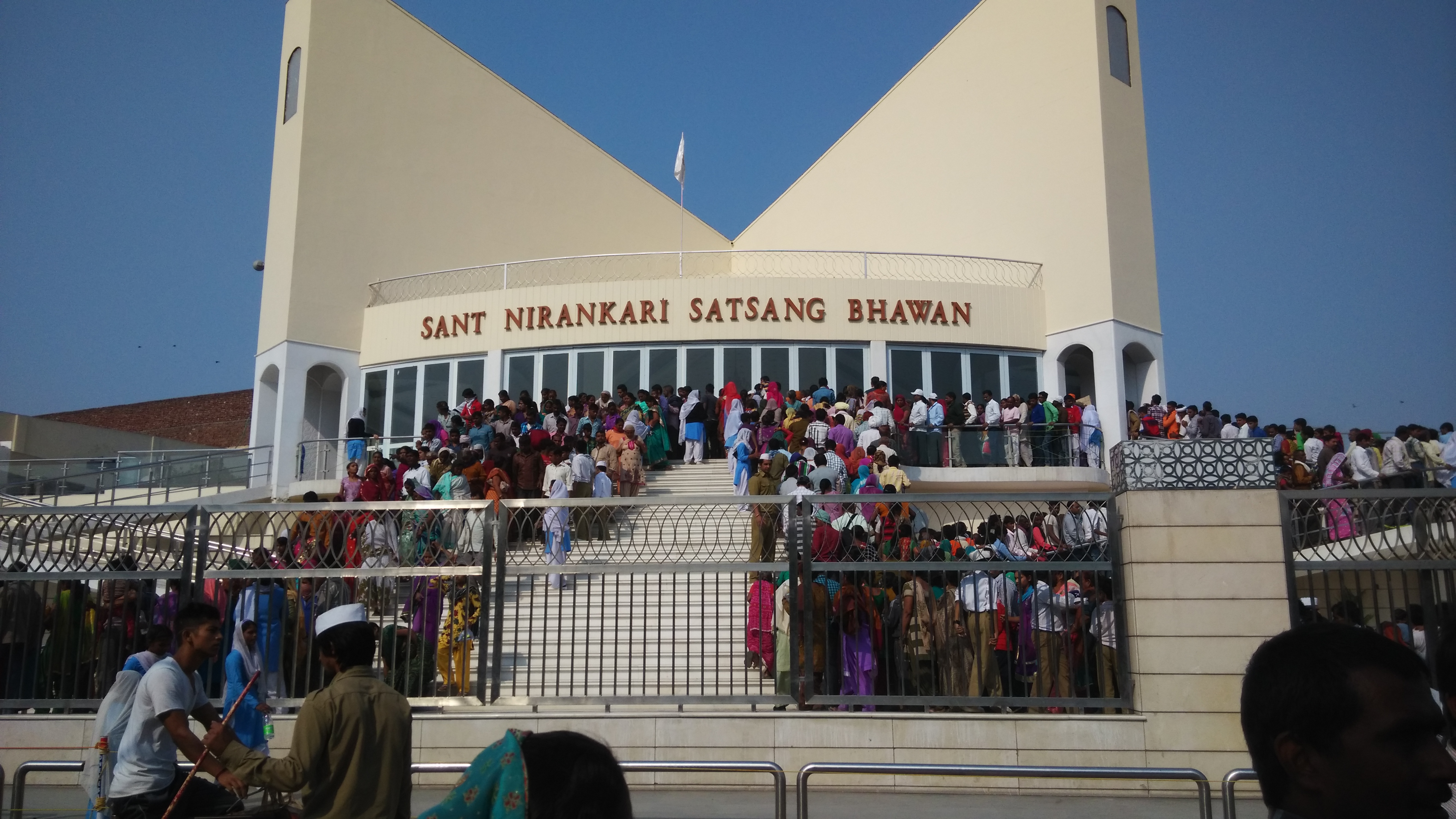
- Sant Nirankari Samagam at Sant Nirankari Colony, New Delhi on 16 Nov 2014
- Abbreviation: SNM
- Scripture: Avtar Bani
- Governance: Sant Nirankari Mandal
- Satguru: Sudiksha
- Headquarters: Sant Nirankari Colony, Delhi: 110 009. India.
- Founder: Buta Singh
- Origin: 25 May 1929; 97 years ago
- Separated from: Nirankari
- Official website: www.nirankari.org
- Slogan: "Universal Brotherhood"

Official logo of the Sant Nirankari Mission

Sant Nirankari Mission is a spiritual organisation based in Delhi, India. It was founded in 1929 by Buta Singh. Mata Sudiksha is the sixth spiritual head of the Mission, taking on the role on 17 July 2018.

== History ==
The Sant Nirankari Mission had its formal beginning on 25 May 1929, the day when Avtar Singh met Buta Singh. In 1943, Buta Singh passed on his position to Avtar Singh. Avtar Singh moved to Delhi after the partition of India, where the "Sant Nirankari Mission" was created in 1948 (in 1947). He was succeeded by his son Gurbachan Singh in 1962.

Gurbachan Singh was assassinated on 24 April 1980. During his final moments, Gurbachan Singh appointed his son Hardev Singh as the next satguru (leader).

In 2016, Mata Savinder succeeded her husband Hardev Singh who died in a road accident in Canada. In 2018, she declared her daughter Sudiksha as the sixth spiritual leader of the organization, days before she died.

== Leaders ==
=== Buta Singh (1929–1943) ===
In 1929, Buta Singh established the Sant Nirankari Mission. Before his death in 1943 at Kohmari, Buta Singh handed over the responsibility of spreading the teachings to Avtar Singh.

=== Avtar Singh (1943–1969) ===
Avtar Singh was born on 31 December 1899 in Latifal village of present-day Pakistan. In May 1929 he met Buta Singh. In 1943, Buta Singh named Avtar Singh as successor before his death.

After the 1947 Indo-Pak partition, Avtar Singh established the Sant Nirankari Mandal in Delhi, India. In 1962, Avtar Singh entrusted it to Gurbachan Singh. Avtar Singh died on 17 September 1969.

=== Gurbachan Singh (1962–1980) ===
Gurbachan Singh was born on 10 December 1930 to Avtar Singh and Budhwanti Kaur, in Peshawar, a city in present-day Pakistan. He was married to Kulwant Kaur ("Nirankari Raj Mata"). Gurbachan Singh took over the organization in 1962. He was assassinated on April 24, 1980.

=== Hardev Singh (1980–2016) ===
Hardev Singh was born on 23 February 1954 in Delhi to Gurbachan Singh and Kulwant Kaur as parents. After the assassination of Gurbachan Singh in 1980, he became the next leader. He was honored by the United Nations (U.N.O.) with special consultative status in 2012, which was later upgraded to general consultative status in 2018.

He died on 13 May 2016 in an automobile accident, when he was travelling to attend a spiritual gathering in Canada with both of his sons-in-law. One of them succumbed to his injuries. The other son in law was driving the vehicle when the accident occurred. Details are still vague around the exact cause of the accident.

=== Savinder (2016–2018) ===
Savinder Hardev was born on 12 January 1957. She was the wife of Hardev Singh. After the death of her husband, she became the fifth head of the organization.

Before her death, she handed over the organization to her daughter Sudiksha. She died on 5 August 2018

=== Sudiksha (2018-present) ===
Sudiksha was born on 13 March 1985. She was named as the leader of the Nirankari Mission on 17 July 2018.

She is now the sixth head of the Nirankari Mission.

== Beliefs ==
The organization teaches "self-realization through God-realization". Being born as a human being through the cycles of reincarnation has been described as superior to all other species of animal created by God. Nirankaris believe that it is "meaningless to worship" until one has a sight of God. Simply repeating the word "water" does not quench your thirst. One must experience "water" and consume it in order to truly quench your thirst. It focuses on the belief that God is formless yet exists in all forms.

== Nirankari Museum ==
The Nirankari Museum was inaugurated by fourth satguru of the Mission, Hardev Singh, on 22 February 2005. The museum is located within the Nirankari Sarovar Complex in New Delhi. It depicts the history and key teachings of the Mission through audio-visuals and pictures.
