= Rode, Moga =

Village in Punjab, India

Coordinates: 30°40′51″N 75°01′09″E

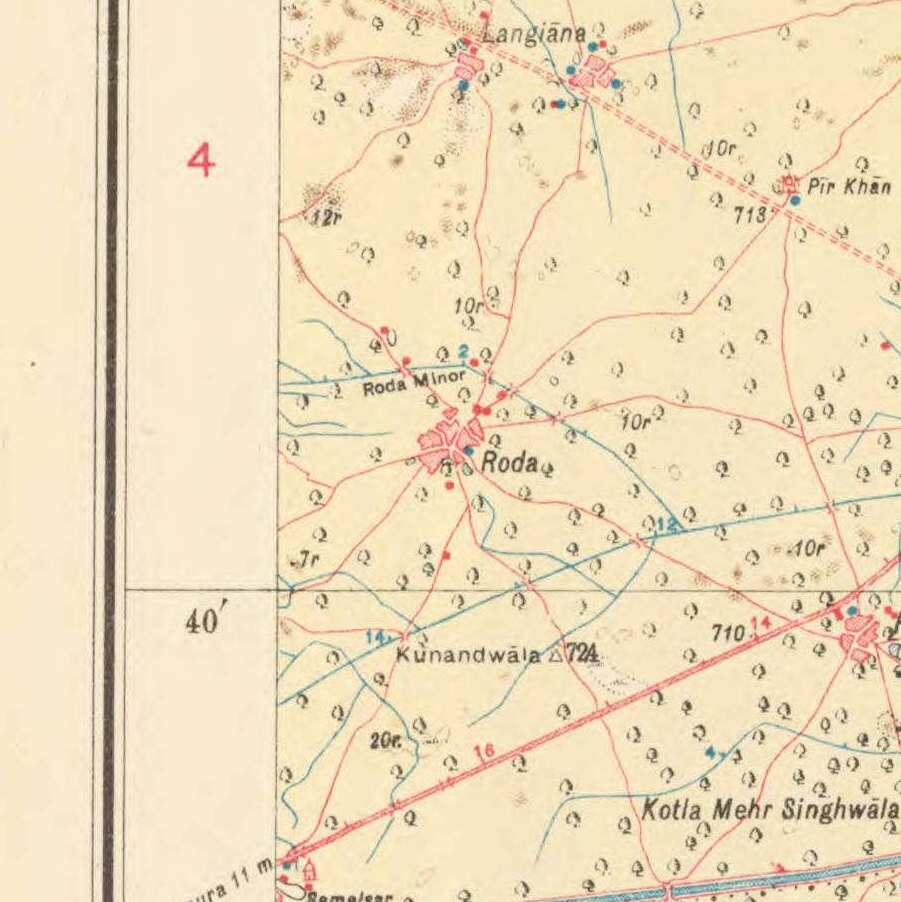
Rode village in Moga tehsil, Survey of India geographical block-map for 44 N NW Ferozepore (1921)

Rode is a village located in Bagha Purana tehsil of Moga district, Punjab, India. As per the 2011 census, it had a population of 9,270.

== History ==
Jarnail Singh Bhindanwale, a major figure of the Dharam Yudh Morcha, was born in Rode in 1947. Sikh leader Amritpal Singh was arrested in Rode in 2023.

== Notable figures ==
- Navtej Bharati
- Jarnail Singh Bhindanwale
