= Jarnail Singh Bhindranwale =

Figure in the Sikh Khalistan movement (1947–1984)

- Born: Jarnail Singh Brar; 2 June 1947; Rode, Moga, Punjab Province, British India (present-day Punjab, India)
- Died: 6 June 1984 (aged 37); Akal Takht, Amritsar, Punjab, India
- Cause of death: Killed in gunfight during Operation Blue Star
- Monuments: Gurdwara Yaadgar Shaheedan, Amritsar
- Occupations: Sikh preacher; Head of Damdami Taksal; Advocate of the Anandpur Sahib Resolution
- Era: Around 1984
- Organization: Damdami Taksal
- Title: Sant
- Successor: Thakur Singh Bhindranwale
- Movement: Dharam Yudh Morcha
- Spouse: Pritam Kaur (m. 1966)
- Children: 2

Jarnail Singh Bhindranwale (Punjabi: [d͡ʒəɾnɛːlə̆ sɪ́ŋɡə̆ pɪ̀ɳɖrãːʋaːɭe]; born Jarnail Singh Brar; 2 June 1947– 6 June 1984) was a Sikh militant. After Operation Bluestar, he posthumously became a leading figure for the Khalistan movement which seeks an independent Sikh state. He, however, neither supported nor opposed the demand for a separate Sikh nation.

He was the fourteenth jathedar or leader, of the prominent orthodox Sikh religious institution Damdami Taksal. An advocate of the Anandpur Sahib Resolution, he gained significant attention after his involvement in the 1978 Sikh-Nirankari clash. In the summer of 1982, Bhindranwale and the Akali Dal launched the Dharam Yudh Morcha ("righteous campaign"), with its stated aim being the fulfilment of a list of demands based on the Anandpur Sahib Resolution to create a largely autonomous state within India. Thousands of people joined the movement in the hope of retaining a larger share of irrigation water and the return of Chandigarh to Punjab. There was dissatisfaction in some sections of the Sikh community with prevailing economic, social, and political conditions. Over time Bhindranwale grew to be a leader of Sikh militancy.

In 1982, Bhindranwale and his group moved to the Golden Temple complex and made it his headquarters. Bhindranwale would establish what amounted to a "parallel government" in Punjab, settling cases and resolving disputes, while conducting his campaign. In 1983, he along with his militant cadre inhabited and fortified the Sikh shrine Akal Takht. In June 1984, Operation Blue Star was carried out by the Indian Army to remove Bhindranwale and his armed followers from the buildings of the Harmandir Sahib in the Golden Temple Complex, which resulted in hundreds to thousands of deaths according to various reports, including that of Bhindranwale.

Bhindranwale has remained a controversial figure in Indian history. While the Sikhs' highest temporal authority Akal Takht describe him as a martyr, with immense appeal among rural sections of the Sikh population, who saw him as a powerful leader, standing up to Indian state dominance and repression, many Indians saw him as spearheading a "revivalist, extremist and terrorist movement", which remains a point of contention.

== Early life ==
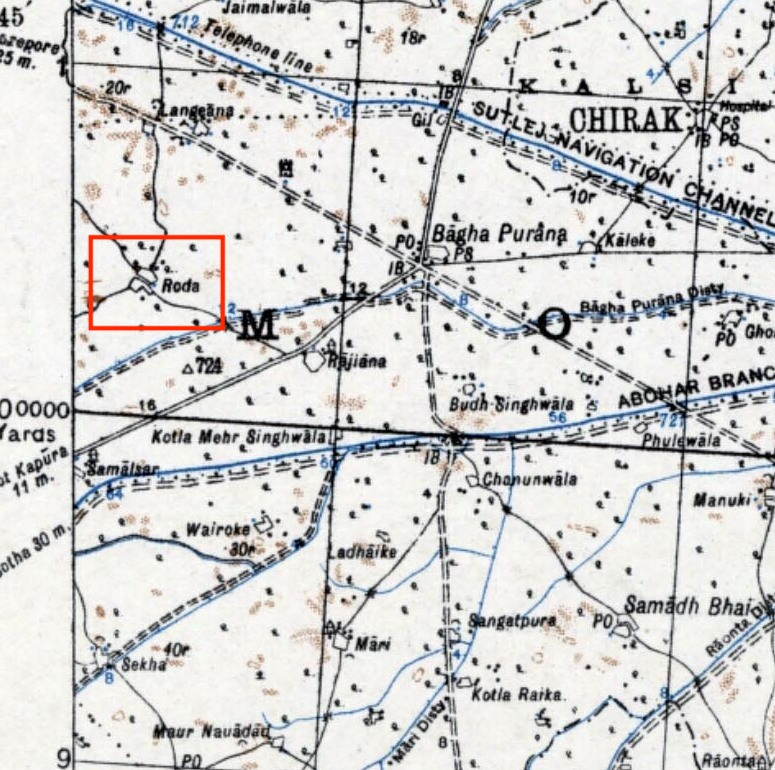
Rode village and environs, Survey of India geographical block-map for 44 N Ludhiana (1943). Rode was the birthplace of Jarnail Singh Bhindranwale.

Bhindranwale was born on 2 June 1947, as Jarnail Singh Brar to a Jat Sikh family, in the village of Rode, in Moga District (then a part of Ferozepur district), located in the region of Malwa. The grandson of Sardar Harnam Singh Brar, his father, Joginder Singh Brar was a farmer and a local Sikh leader, and his mother was Nihal Kaur. Jarnail Singh was the seventh of eight siblings of seven brothers and one sister. He was put into a school in 1953 at the age of 6 but he dropped out of school five years later to work with his father on the farm.

=== Marriage ===
He married Pritam Kaur, the daughter of Sucha Singh of Bilaspur at the age of nineteen. The couple had two sons, Ishar Singh and Inderjit Singh, in 1971 and 1975, respectively. After the death of Bhindranwale, Pritam Kaur moved along with her sons to Bilaspur village in Moga district and stayed with her brother. She died of heart ailment at age 60, on 15 September 2007 in Jalandhar.

== Damdami Taksal ==
=== Early years ===
In 1965, he was enrolled by his father at the Damdami Taksal also known as Bhindran Taksal, a religious school near Moga, Punjab, named after the village of Bhindran Kalan where its leader Gurbachan Singh Bhindranwale lived. Though based out of Gurdwara Akhand Parkash there, he took his pupils on extended tours of the countryside. After a one-year course in scriptural, theological and historical studies with Gurbachan Singh Khalsa, partly during a tour but mostly during his stay at Gurdwara Sis Asthan Patshahi IX near Nabha, he rejoined his family and returned to farming, marrying in 1966. Maintaining ties with the Taksal, he continued studies under Kartar Singh, who became the new head of the Taksal after Gurbachan Singh Khalsa's death in June 1969, and would establish his headquarters at Gurdwara Gurdarshan Prakash at Mehta Chowk, approximately 25 kilometers northeast of Amritsar. He quickly became the favourite student of Kartar Singh. Unlike other students he had had familial responsibilities, and he would take time off from the seminary and go back and forth month to month to take care of his wife and two children, balancing his familial and religious responsibilities.

=== Successor to the Taksal ===
Kartar Singh Khalsa died in a car accident on 16 August 1977. Before his death, Kartar Singh had appointed the then 31-year-old Bhindranwale as his successor. His son, Amrik Singh, would become a close companion of Jarnail Singh. Bhindranwale was formally elected the 14th jathedar of the Damdami Taksal at a bhog ceremony at Mehta Chowk on 25 August 1977. He adopted the name "Bhindranwale" meaning "from [the village of] Bhindran [Kalan]", the location of the Bhindran Taksal branch of the Damdami Taksal, and attained the religious title of "Sant". He concluded most of his family responsibilities to dedicate full time to the Taksal, thus following a long tradition of “sants”, an important part of rural Sikh life. Henceforth his family saw him solely in Sikh religious congregations known as satsangs, though his son Ishar Singh would describe his youth as being "well looked after" and "never in need." As a missionary Sant of the Taksal, he would tour the villages to give dramatic public sermons and reading of scripture. He preached the disaffected young Sikhs, encouraging them to return to the path of the Khalsa by giving up consumerism in family life and abstaining from drugs and alcohol, the two main vices afflicting rural society in Punjab, and as a social reformer, denounced practices like the dowry, and encouraged a return to the simple lifestyle prior to the increased wealth of the state and the reversal of the decline in morals following the Green Revolution. As one observer noted, "The Sant's following grew as he successfully regenerated the good life of purity, dedication and hard work.... These basic values of life...had been the first casualty of commercial capitalism." His focus on fighting for the Sikh cause appealed to many young Sikhs. Bhindranwale never learned English but had good grasp of Punjabi language. His speeches were released in the form of audio cassette tapes and circulated in villages. Later on, he became adept with press and gave radio and television interviews as well. His sermons urged the centrality of religious values to life, calling on the members of congregations to be:

"…one who takes the vows of faith and helps others take it; who reads the scriptures and helps others do the same; who avoids liquor and drugs and helps others do likewise; who urges unity and co-operation; who preaches community, and be attached to your Lord's throne and home."

From July 1977 to July 1982, he extensively toured cities and villages of Punjab to preach the Sikh faith. He also visited other states and cities in India, mostly in gurdwaras, in Punjab, Haryana and Chandigarh. His meetings were attended by rapt "throngs of the faithful – and the curious." He advocated against decreasing religious observance, cultural changes occurring in Punjab, rising substance abuse, and use of alcohol and pornography, encouraging religious initiation by taking amrit (the administration of which had been his primary task during his tours) and fulfilling religious obligations, including wearing the outward religious symbols of the faith, like the turban and beard. He appeared at a time when leaders were not engaged in the community, traveled from city to city instead of being based in an office or gurdwara and delegating, solved domestic disputes and showed no interest in a political career, seeing himself foremost as a man of religion. People soon began to seek his intervention in addressing social grievances, and he began to hold court to settle disputes. This reflected the widespread disenchantment among the masses with expensive, time-consuming bureaucratic procedures that often did not ensure justice. Bhindranwale's verdicts were widely respected and helped to gain him enormous popularity, as well as his "remarkable ability" as a preacher and his ability to quote religious texts and evoke the relevance of historical events in the present time.

Khushwant Singh, a critic of Bhindranwale, allowed that

“Bhindranwale's amrit parchar was a resounding success. Adults in their thousands took oaths in public to abjure liquor, tobacco and drugs and were baptized. Videocassettes showing blue films and cinema houses lost out to the village gurdwara. Men not only saved money they had earlier squandered in self-indulgence, but now worked longer hours on their lands and raised better crops. They had much to be grateful for to Jarnail Singh who came to be revered by them."

== Politics ==
It is generally believed that in the late 1970s, Indira Gandhi's Congress party attempted to co-opt Bhindranwale in a bid to split Sikh votes and weaken the Akali Dal, its chief rival in Punjab. Congress supported the candidates backed by Bhindranwale in the 1978 SGPC elections. The theory of Congress involvement has been contested on grounds including that Gandhi's imposition of President's rule in 1980 had essentially disbanded all Punjab political powers regardless, with no assistance required to take control, and has been challenged by scholarship. According to The New York Times, Sanjay Gandhi had approached Bhindranwale, then the newly appointed head of the Damdami Taksal, after Indira Gandhi lost the 1977 Indian general election, but after Congress resumed power in 1980, would find out that he could not be controlled or directed.

The Congress CM (and later President) Giani Zail Singh, who allegedly financed the initial meetings of the separatist organisation Dal Khalsa, amid attempts to cater to and capitalize on the surge in Sikh religious revivalism in Punjab. The Akali Dal would also attempt to cater to the same electoral trend during the same period following electoral defeats in 1972 and 1980, resulting from a pivot to a secular strategy in the 1960s and the accompanying coalition partnerships necessary to guarantee electoral success, most notably with the Jan Sangh, a party of urban Hindu communalism. This later turned out to be a miscalculation by Congress, as Bhindranwale's political objectives became popular among the agricultural Jat Sikhs in the region, as he would advocate for the state's water rights central to the state's economy, in addition to leading Sikh revivalism.

In 1979, Bhindranwale put up forty candidates against the Akali candidates in the SGPC election for a total of 140 seats, winning four seats. A year later, Bhindranwale used Zail Singh's patronage to put up candidates in three constituencies' during the general elections, winning a significant number of seats from Gurdaspur, Amritsar and Ferozepur districts. Despite this success, he would not personally seek any political office. He had the acumen to play off of both Akali and Congress attempts to capitalize off of him, as association with him garnered Sikh votes while putting other constituencies at risk. According to one analysis,

“Nearly every academic and media source on the rise of Bhindranwale notes his apparent ties to the Congress party, particularly through Giani Zail Singh, the president of India, up through the early 1980s. The intent was allegedly to use Bhindranwale as a pawn against the Akali Dal, Congress’ chief political rival in Punjab. Several of my interlocutors claim an opposite scenario: that is, that the Akali Dal itself started rumors of Bhindranwale's links to Congress as a way of thwarting his growing popularity among its own constituency. There is evidence for both of these possibilities, and I believe Robin Jeffrey may be most accurate in his assessment when he writes that “the evidence suggests that Bhindranwale exercised a cunning independence, playing the factional antagonisms of Punjab politics with knowledge and skill…. In this independence lay much of Bhindranwale's appeal. If left him untainted by close association with any of the older political leaders, yet at the same time suggested that he knew how to handle them." Whatever ties Bhindranwale may have had with Congress in the early days, it would be misleading to suggest that Congress "created" the Bhindranwale phenomenon. It was in my opinion, sui generis. Help may have been received from outside [later on during the insurgency], but the dynamic to be understood here is internal. Emphasizing the role of outside agencies, rather, is a way of minimizing the seriousness of the challenge presented by Bhindranwale himself.”

Bhindranwale himself addressed rumors of being such an agent, which were spread by Akali leadership during mid-1983, as his expanding support came at the expense of the Akali Dal amid mass leadership defections, seeing them as attempts to reduce his by-then huge support base in Punjab. He would refute this in April 1984 by comparing his actions to the Akalis, referring to the granting of gun licenses to Akalis by the Congress administration while his had been canceled, and that he did not enter the house of any Congress-aligned faction (including congressites, communists, and socialists), Sikhs associated with him being arrested and their homes confiscated, and police destruction on his property, while Akali politicians would have dinners with figures aligned with Congress, like former chief minister Darbara Singh, who Bhindranwale would accuse of atrocities against Sikhs.

Bhindranwale did not respect conventional SGPC or Akali Dal apparatchiks, believing them to have "become mealy-mouthed, corrupt and deviated from the martial tenets of the faith," after they had failed to support the Sikhs during the 1978 Sikh-Nirankari clashes due to pressure from their coalition partners. Described as having "unflinching zeal and firm convictions," Bhindranwale did "not succumb to the pressure of big-wigs in the Akali Party nor could he be manipulated by the authorities to serve their ends." According to Gurdarshan Singh, "Those who tried to mend him or bend him to suit their designs underestimated his tremendous will and ultimately lost their own ground. He never became their tool. People who promoted his cause or helped him to rise to prominence were disillusioned, when he refused to play the second fiddle to them and declined to tread the path laid down for him. Paradoxical though it may seem, they became his unwilling tools. Thousands listened to him with rapt attention at the Manji Sahib gatherings. He had tremendous power to mobilise the masses. His charisma and eloquence overshadowed other leaders."

In order to overcome the hegemony of the Akali Dal, rather than being used, Bhindranwale would exploit the Congress and then the Akali Dal itself. The Akali Dal had begun to neglect Sikh needs in favor of maintaining political alliances necessary to keep power, resulting in their electoral loss in 1972, and the resulting Anandpur Sahib Resolution, meant to win back Sikh support, remained neglected while the party focused on reversing the overcentralization of political power that had taken place during the Emergency. Described as "a rational actor with his own goals," his first concern was to rejuvenate Sikhism as a leader of the community.

Further, the Damdami Taksal already had a history of openly opposing and criticizing Congress government policies before, as Kartar Singh Khalsa Bhindranwale, the leader of the institution prior to Jarnail Singh Bhindranwale, had been a severe critic of the excesses of Indira Gandhi's Emergency rule, even in her presence as far back as 1975. Kartar Singh had also gotten a resolution passed by the SGPC on 18 November 1973, condemning the various anti-Sikh activities of the Sant Nirankaris, which were based in Delhi. Both Kartar Singh Bhindranwale and the Damdami Taksal had commanded such a level of respect in Sikh religious life that the Akali ministry had given him a state funeral upon his death on 20 August 1977. Jarnail Singh Bhindranwale would also mention the Sikhs facing the government with 37 major protests against Emergency rule under Congress during this era as fighting against tyranny. Emergency rule had initially been utilized to avert criminal charges on Gandhi, who was linked to misuse of government property during the upcoming election, which would have invalidated her campaign, and endowed the central government with powers including preemptive arrests, as well as the arrest of many political opponents.

On Jarnail Singh Bhindranwale becoming leader of the Damdami Taksal, another of the Taksal students explained, “[Nothing changed] in political terms. It was just the same way. The Indian government thought that maybe although they could not stop Sant Kartar Singh [Bhindranwale], maybe Sant Jarnail Singh [Bhindranwale] would be weaker. That was not the case.”

=== Clash with Sant Nirankaris ===
On 13 April 1978, the anniversary of the founding of the Khalsa, a Sant Nirankari convention was organized in Amritsar, with permission from the Akali state government. The practices of the "Sant Nirankaris" subsect of Nirankaris was considered as heretics by the orthodox Sikhism expounded by Bhindranwale, though the conflict between the Sikhs and the Sant Nirankaris preceded Bhindranwale; the Sant Nirankaris had been declared by the priests of the Golden Temple as enemies of the Sikhs in 1973, and the Damdami Taksal had opposed them since the 1960s, during the time of Kartar Singh Khalsa. They had exemplified both the internal and external threats to Sikhism that Bhindranwale spoke of in speeches, as their scriptures made derogatory references to the Guru Granth Sahib, the sect's leader proclaiming himself as a guru in its place and calling himself the baja-wala (a reference to Guru Gobind Singh), and because of their undermining of the Sikh structure and affiliation with Congress.

From the Golden Temple premises, Bhindranwale delivered a stirring sermon, where he announced he would not allow the Nirankari convention to take place. According to Tully and Jacob, Bhindranwale declared "We are going to march there and cut them to pieces!" After the speech a large contingent of about two hundred Sikhs led by Bhindranwale and Fauja Singh, the head of the Akhand Kirtani Jatha, left the Golden Temple and proceeded to the Nirankari Convention with the intention of stopping its proceedings. The contingent cut off the arm of a Hindu sweetmeats on the way to the Nirankari Convention. Fauja Singh allegedly attempted to behead Nirankari chief Gurbachan Singh with his sword but was shot dead by Gurbachan's bodyguard subsequently resulting in an armed clash between the two groups. Bhindranwale fled as the clash began. In the ensuing violence, several people were killed: two of Bhindranwale's followers, eleven members of the Akhand Kirtani Jatha and three members of the Sant Nirankari sect. This event brought Bhindranwale to the limelight in the media, and brought him into the political arena. According to Kirpal Dhillon, former DGP of Punjab, the reported participation of some senior Punjab government officials in the convention also may have emboldened the Sant Nirankaris to attack the protestors.

Sikhs reacted to the clashes by holding massive demonstrations, some violent, in both Punjab and Delhi. A religious letter of authority was released by Akal Takht, the governing Sikh body, which directed Sikhs to use "all appropriate means" to prevent the Sant Nirankaris from growing and flourishing in society, and forbid Sikhs from keeping social ties with the Nirankaris and threatened those who did not do so with religious punishment (left ambiguous, though clarified by the jathedar to mean by standard religious teaching).

A criminal case was filed against sixty two Nirankaris, by the Akali led government in Punjab. The investigation concluded that the attack on the Sikhs was planned by a number of accused, including Gurbachan Singh. All the accused were taken into custody except Gurbachan Singh, who was arrested later in Delhi, but only after a personal audience with the Prime Minister Morarji Desai. The Sant Nirankaris had firmly supported the Emergency, and developed close links with many Congress politicians and bureaucrats, creating a strong foothold in Delhi political circles, as well as engendering opposition from the Akalis and the Damdami Taksal during the same period.

The case was heard in the neighbouring Haryana state, and all the accused were acquitted on grounds of self-defence on 4 January 1980, two days before the Lok Sabha poll. Though the case failed as authorities in Punjab were unable to ensure that the prosecution witness remained uncompromised by interested parties and police in Karnal, the Punjab government Chief Minister Prakash Singh Badal decided not to appeal the decision. The case of the Nirankaris received widespread support in the Hindi media in Punjab and from Congress, which upon returning to central power also dismissed the Akali government in Punjab, where fresh elections were held and a Congress government installed; orthodox Sikhs considered this to be a conspiracy to defame the Sikh religion.

Bhindranwale increased his rhetoric against the enemies of Sikhs. The chief proponents of this rhetoric were the Babbar Khalsa founded by the widow, Bibi Amarjit Kaur of the Akhand Kirtani Jatha, whose husband Fauja Singh had been at the head of the march in Amritsar; the Damdami Taksal led by Jarnail Singh Bhindranwale who had also been in Amritsar on the day of the outrage; the Dal Khalsa, formed after the events; and the All India Sikh Students Federation. His "very public" rhetoric of Indira Gandhi's involvement in the trials was one of the initial reasons the central government became concerned with Bhindranwale, as well as the historic martial identity Sikhs were returning to because of him. Under Bhindranwale, the number of people joining the Khalsa increased. The rhetoric that were based on the "perceived 'assault' on Sikh values from the Hindu community", also increased in this period.

In the subsequent years following this event, several murders took place in Punjab and the surrounding areas, regarded to be committed by Bhindranwale's group or the newly founded Babbar Khalsa, which opposed Bhindranwale and was more inclined towards committing sectarian violence and enforcing Sikh personal law The Babbar Khalsa activists took up residence in the Golden Temple, where they would retreat to, after committing "acts of punishment" on people against the orthodox Sikh tenets. On 24 April 1980, The Nirankari head, Gurbachan was murdered. The First Information Report named twenty people for the murder, including several known associates of Jarnail Singh Bhindrawale, who was also charged with conspiracy to murder. Bhindranwale took residence in Golden Temple to allegedly escape arrest when he was accused of the assassination of Nirankari Gurbachan Singh. Bhindranwale remained in hiding until the Home Minister of India, Zail Singh announced to Parliament that Bhindranwale had nothing to do with the murder. Shortly after, Bhindranwale announced that the killer of the Nirankari chief deserved to be honored by the high priest of Akal Takht, and that he would weigh the killers in gold if they came to him. It would turn out that a member of the Akhand Kirtani Jatha, Ranjit Singh, surrendered and admitted to the assassination three years later, and was sentenced to serve thirteen years at the Tihar Jail in Delhi.

=== The AISSF ===
Bhindranwale's message was enthusiastically received by an emerging underclass of educated rural Sikhs, whose suffered from the unequal distribution of benefits from the Green Revolution. Punjab had enjoyed the second-highest percentage of children in school after Kerala at the time, along with high college enrollment, at the same time with unemployment rates among college graduates far above the national average. Unemployment was caused by distortions caused by the disparity between agricultural growth and a stunted industrial sector; marginal and poor peasants could not reap the benefits of the land nor find employment in the industrial sector. By the late 1970s the educations of rural Sikhs, many from the Majha area, did not reap financial benefit, many found the urban college environment alienating, and the Akali Dal was engaged in political activities that bore little relation to the demands of educated but unemployed rural Sikhs youth. Bhindranwale's message increasingly appealed to them, and their support grew with police excesses, and as Bhindranwale expressed concern over the many breaches of civil rights, and those killed during and after 1978 in protests. The class dimension was described by India Today in 1986 as follows:

“The backbone of the Taksal and the AISSF are the sons and daughters of Punjab's middle and low-level peasantry and agricultural workers. The challenge to the Akali and SGPC leadership, which is dominated by leaders from the Malwa region [(of Punjab)], comes from what was once its base – the small and middle peasants. The socio-economic roots of the Taksal and the AISSF leaders are totally different from [the Akali leaders] ... Barnala, Badal, Balwant, Ravinder and Amrinder, all of whom come from the landed gentry classes of the state.”

The All-India Sikh Students Federation, or AISSF, founded in 1943 to attract educated Sikh youth to the Akali movement, had traditionally followed the direction of the Akali Dal and fought for more political power for the Sikhs, fighting for an independent Sikh state before Partition, and afterwards taking up the Punjabi Suba cause. After the establishment of Punjab state, the AISSF had fallen into disarray by the 1970s, and during this period of increasing economic pressures on the state, student politics were dominated by rural Communist organizations. Amrik Singh was elected president in July 1978, and his organizational skills and Bhindranwale's legitimacy as the head of a respected religious institution restored the Federation as a powerful political force, and the AISSF and Bhindranwale were further united in being anti-Communist. With a well-educated leadership, many with advanced degrees, membership exploded from 10,000 to well over 100,000, and under Amrik Singh, the AISSF's first concern was the Sikh identity.

AISSF secretary-general Harminder Singh Sandhu ascribed the preceding period of youth politics as resulting from the passivity of the Akali leadership in relation to the central government, seen as betraying Sikh interests, which caused resentment among the AISSF. By 1980 they felt ready to redefine Punjab's relationship with the center, and the revival of the AISSF and the presence of Bhindranwale put enormous pressure on the Akali Dal.

Bhindranwale was suspicious of Sikh elites, describing them as a class possessing the ability for multiple allegiances, and therefore, could not be relied upon by a mass movement based upon religious foundations which justified protest against discrimination and abuses of power and repression. As such he was often opposed particularly by some Sikh members of the class with business and land interests outside of Punjab, and those occupying high administrative positions. As part of a preaching tradition, he saw the lives of such Sikhs, described as sycophants of Indira Gandhi for power, as a departure threatening the distinct identity of the Sikhs. He saw that path as having to be corrected, along with deviationist and Communist trends, of Sikh officers whose loyalty lay with the state over the Sikh panth tradition, emphasizing unification of the community and pushing those officers in government service to work for such unity.

==== Anti-tobacco march ====
In May 1981, the AISSF led a protest against tobacco and other intoxicants, prohibited in Sikhism, in the Sikh religious city of Amritsar, and to have it declared a holy city. Cities elsewhere in the country like Haridwar, Kurukshetra and Varanasi already had similar bans in place, including on the sale of meat and eggs, on Hindu religious grounds. The AISSF had wanted 408 cigarette sellers to relocate or find other business by 15 May, offering compensation and alternative locations, and on that day a procession was planned for 31 May in pursuit of these demands.

The On 29 May members of the Arya Samaj, R.S.S., and other Hindu organizations took out a "right to smoke" procession, with 10,000 participants brandishing swords and lit cigarettes, in which anti-Sikh slogans were released as well as the slogan, "bidi piyenge, shaan se jiyenge" ("we will smoke cigarettes living with pride"), despite smoking not being a Hindu religious tenet, which the Sikhs considered to be irrationally communal.

In response to the 29 May procession, Bhindranwale brought in his followers to the 31 May AISSF protest, amplifying what, without the Arya Samaj's actions, could have been a small protest of under 500. It would be with Bhindranwale and the Sikhs that the police clashed on 31 May, resulting in a dozen Sikh deaths and adding to tensions; as participants were returning after the procession, a stone was thrown at them near a police station, setting off a mob. An Arya Samaj temple in Amritsar continued to be at the center of repeated skirmishes between the police and Hindu teenagers through the next day, who threw bricks at the police.

=== Incident at Chando Kalan ===
On 9 September 1981, Lala Jagat Narain, the founder editor of the newspaper Punjab Kesari, was murdered. He was viewed as a supporter of the Nirankari sect and had written several editorials that had condemned Bhindranwale. An Arya Samaji known for his staunch communal tendencies reflected in his daily newspaper in Punjab, Lala had urged Hindus of Punjab to reply to government census that Hindi and not Punjabi was their mother tongue and decried the Anandpur Sahib Resolution. His paper played a significant role in "fanning the flames of communal hatred between Hindus and Sikhs," and the Hindi press based in Jalandhar consistently vilified the Sikhs, without making any distinction between one Sikh group or another. Narain had been present at the clash between the Nirankaris and the Akhand Kirtani Jatha and had served as a witness in the court case of the incident.

Punjab Police issued a warrant for Bhindranwale's arrest in the editor's murder, as he had often spoken out against the well-known editor. Bhindranwale, who at the time was on a preaching tour, was camped in Chando Kalan, a village in Hissar district in Haryana, 200 miles from Amritsar. A combined force of Punjab and Haryana Police planned a search operation in an attempt to locate and arrest Bhindranwale on 14 September 1981. According to veteran Indian journalist Kuldip Nayar, the Haryana Chief Minister, Bhajan Lal was instructed by the Home Minister, Zail Singh, to not arrest Bhindranwale. Bhindranwale and others Sikh religious leaders also relayed that police had behaved illegally with the Sikh inhabitants of the village during the search in which the valuables from homes belonging to Sikhs were reported to have been looted and two buses owned by the Damdami Taksal containing a number of birs (copies) of the Guru Granth Sahib were set on fire.

There was violence in Chando Kalan when the Punjab Police team reached the location, between supporters of Bhindranwale and police. The Punjab Police, incensed that the Haryana Police had allowed Bhindranwale to flee, set his vans which had contained written records of sermons of Bhindranwale for posterity on fire. According to the official version: When the Punjab Police arrived to Chando Kalan to arrest Bhindranwale, some followers of his fired upon the police, resulting in exchange of fire and incidents of arson. The clashes with the police resulted in the deaths of at least 11 people. The burning of his sermons had angered Bhindranwale, who secured himself in his fortified Gurdwara Gurdarshan Parkash located at Mehta Chowk. Bhindranwale at this point turned against Zail Singh and other senior congress leaders with whom he was previously associated with.

==== Arrest at Mehta Chowk ====
As his location became common knowledge, the police surrounded the gurdwara at Mehta Chowk. Darbara Singh insisted on Bhindranwale's arrest, though the central government feared the possibility of clashes as large numbers of Sikhs had gathered at the gurdwara in his support. For negotiating Bhindranwale's surrender, the senior officers went inside the gurdwara. Bhindranwale agreed to surrender for arrest at 1:00 p.m. on 20 September 1981, but added a condition that will do so only after addressing the religious congregation. This condition was accepted by the police. At the agreed time he emerged address a large crowd of his followers who armed with spears, swords and several firearms. Several prominent Akali leaders such as Gurcharan Singh Tohra, Harchand Singh Longowal and the Delhi Sikh Gurdwara Management Committee's Jathedar Santokh Singh were present. Bhindranwale delivered a sermon proclaiming his innocence and against the state government trying to have him arrested, receiving the support of almost every senior Akali leader, also against the perceived injustices done to the Sikhs and himself. He ended his speech asking the mob not to act violent after his arrest. Bhindranwale then offered himself to the police for arrest on 20 September 1981, and was taken to a circuit house instead of prison. Shortly after Bhindranwale courted arrest, agitated Sikhs clashed with the police and paramilitary forces, resulting in the death of 18 protestors.

On the day of his arrest, three armed men on motorcycle opened fire using machine guns in a market in Jalandhar in retaliation, killing four people and injured twelve. The next day, in another incident at Tarn Taran one Hindu man was killed and thirteen people were injured. On 25 September, in Amritsar a goods train was derailed. On 29 September, Indian Airlines Flight 423 was hijacked and taken to Lahore. The hijackers demanded Bhindranwale's release. Several bomb blasts were made in Punjab's Amritsar, Faridkot and Gurdaspur districts. On 9 October bombs were hurrled at the residence of the General Assistant to the Deputy Commissioner of Amritsar and at the home of an ASI in Moga.

Several violent incidents happened in Punjab during the next 25 days after the arrest. The Akali Dal leadership was in the process of reestablishing its Sikh credentials after its secular administration during its protests against the Emergency, and under Longowal decided to publicly support Bhindranwale, the most popular Sikh religious leader in Punjab at that point. Bhindranwale also got support from the President of the SGPC, Tohra and the Jathedar of the Akal Takht, Gurdial Singh Ajnoha. India's Home Minister, Giani Zail Singh, then announced in the Parliament that there was no evidence against Bhindranwale in his involvement in Lala Jagat Narain's murder, and on 14 October 1981 Bhindranwale was released by the Punjab Police. After his release he was able to keep the party on a strongly nationalist course, and released a public statement approving the murders of Gurbachan Singh and Lala Jagat Narain and that the killers deserved to be honoured and awarded their weight in gold, according to KPS Gill. In a statement regarding Narain in early 1982 for the publication India Today, Bhindranwale stated:

"We are no extremists or communalists. Give us one instance when we insulted or hit anyone. But the Government terms us extremists. We are extremists if we protest when our Gurus are painted as lovers of wine and women by the Lala's newspapers. I preach that all Sikhs must observe their tenets and be the Guru's warriors. Let all Hindus wear their sacred thread and put tilak on their foreheads, we shall honour them. I stand for Hindu-Sikh unity. Let the Hindus at least once declare that they stand for Sikh-Hindu unity. Let the prime minister, whose forefathers our Guru Tegh Bahadur saved by sacrificing his life, declare that she is for unity."

Bhindranwale's arrest and subsequent release raised his stature among the Sikh populace and especially the youth, who, comparing him to the ineffectual Akali leadership, flocked to him. He would become increasingly outspoken toward the Congress government, which would attempt to harass and detain him and other senior members of the Taksal several times in 1982.

== Dharam Yudh Morcha ==
The Anandpur Sahib Resolution, and the 1978 Ludhiana Resolution based on it, put socio-economic concerns at the core and called for an end to the center's control of Punjab's river waters and its unjust distribution, state control of the headworks, and better procurement prices and subsidies for the state's farmers. These issues were of particular concern to the state's rural Sikh population who supported them, as the Sikhs dominated the agricultural sector and rural areas. Other demands included the maintenance of the ratio of Sikhs in the army, protections of Sikhs outside Punjab, Punjabi as a second language for states with significant Punjabi-speaking populations, amendments to tax and property policies for rural populations, a broadcasting station and a dry port at Amritsar, and a stock exchange at Ludhiana.

From a set of 45 economic, political, religious, and social policies formulated in September 1981, a list of 15 demands would be prepared in October, of which five were economic. The Dharam Yudh Morcha would champion these preliminary demands. The subsequent inclusion of religious demands were a result of polarization of Akali goals following failed negotiations in November with the Congress government, which would raise the spectre of separatism to exploit the fears of Hindu voters and push the Akalis into a corner. Other factors included attempts to ally with, or outbid, more militant Sikh factions, which gained traction following the lack of progress in talks, and the growing religious revivalism that both the Akalis and Congress would attempt to play to gain influence. According to Atul Kohli,

"The repeated failure of the Akalis to wrest power from Congress had left open a political space for those who argued that increased militancy was the only means for protecting Sikh interests. Bhindranwale stepped into that space."

As a result of his rising popularity, Bhindranwale faced opposition from all sides, including the government and rival Sikh factions, both political and militant. One of Bhindranwale's main concerns in his speeches was condemning factionalism and internal disunity among the Sikhs. The Akali Dal leadership had initially opposed Bhindranwale. While Bhindranwale ceded leadership to the Akali Dal and disavowed political ambition, in 1980 the Akali Dal faced a serious challenge from Bhindranwale and his mass support from the AISSF, the Akali youth wing. As Bhindranwale became increasingly influential, the party decided to join forces with him. In August 1982, under the leadership of Harcharan Singh Longowal, the Akali Dal launched the Dharam Yudh Morcha, or "righteous campaign," in collaboration with Bhindranwale to win more autonomy for Punjab. At the start of the protest movement, in response to long-standing wrongs not addressed by the state's economic and political process, the Akali leaders had, in their Ardas, or prayer, at the Akal Takht, resolved that they would continue the struggle until the Anandpur Sahib Resolution was accepted and implemented by the Government. The Akalis, in their subsequent electoral defeat in 1980, would be forced by the presence of Bhindranwale and his huge base of support in the AISSF to return to its Sikh base, for whom the Anandpur Sahib Resolution had originally been written to regain the declining support of, before it had fallen by the wayside.

Later, noting Indira Gandhi's intransigence, it appeared that the Akali leaders were willing to water down their demands. Bhindranwale reminded his audiences that it had been Gurcharan Singh Tohra, Surjit Singh Barnala, Balwant Singh and other leaders who had been were signatories to the Anandpur Sahib Resolution and that he was not present when the Resolution was adopted. He insisted, however, that having said the Ardas at the Akal Takht, no Sikh could go back on his solemn word. Longowal's core political base began to wither; about a third of his SGPC members and district Akali presidents reportedly defected to Bhindranwale. Bhindranwale promised the Sikh masses that he would not allow the chief Akali leadership to fail them as during the Punjabi Suba movement.

Despite the Resolution's endorsement of "the principle of State autonomy in keeping with the concept of Federalism," Indira Gandhi and the central government took a hard line, emphasizing the Sikh demands and treating them as tantamount to secession, thus putting moderate Sikh politicians at a competitive disadvantage in an increasingly frustrated and militant political arena. She would be later characterized by prime minister Charan Singh as following "a megalomaniacal policy based on elitist philosophies," and her successor Rajiv Gandhi would later describe the Resolution as "not secessionist but negotiable," recognizing the failures of her autocratic style of governance. Thousands of people joined the movement as they felt that it represented a real solution to their demands, such as a larger share of water for irrigation, and return of Chandigarh to Punjab. By early October, more than 25,000 Akali workers courted arrest in Punjab in support of the agitation.

=== Protests ===
The basic issues of the Dharam Yudh Morcha were related to the prevention of the digging of the SYL Canal, the redrawing of Punjab's boundaries following the Punjabi Suba movement to include left-out Punjabi-speaking areas, the restoration of Chandigarh to Punjab, the redefining of relations between the central government and the state, and greater autonomy for the state as envisioned in the Anandpur Sahib Resolution and as was constitutionally due. The most important demand was the restoration of the state's river waters as per constitutional, national and international norms based on riparian principles; more than 75% of the state's river water were being drained from the state, to Rajasthan and Haryana, which were non-riparian states, and its accompanying hydropower potential, powered by Punjab's only natural wealth.

Following failed talks, the Nehr Roko Morcha, or “struggle to stop the canal,” was launched on April 24, 1982, by the Akali Dal at the village of Kapuri, Punjab to prevent the initial digging of the SYL Canal which would have diverted most of the state's water to Haryana, resulting in volunteer arrests. The protest, despite massive support from the Sikh peasantry, was not yielding results as Kapuri, where the Prime Minister had inaugurated the digging of the canal, was a remote border village distant from Akali headquarters, and the Akalis would decide to relocate the agitation to Amritsar in August. Meanwhile, an attempt had been made to arrest Bhindranwale on 20 April 1982 while he was staying in the Singh Sabha Gurdwara in Dadar in Mumbai, though he would successfully reach the safety of his base in Mehta Chowk. However, he would leave his base in Chowk Mehta for the security of the Guru Nanak Niwas in the Golden Temple complex on 20 July and call for a Panthic convention there on 25 July for the release of his men, after Amrik Singh was arrested on 19 July with two other followers; Amrik Singh had offended the appointed Punjab Governor Marri Chenna Reddy by protesting the mass arrest of the Akali volunteers and pleading their case, while Thara Singh, another leading member of the Taksal, was arrested the following day, highly provoking Bhindranwale. He joined his movement for their release to the larger Akali movement, which was then already designated dharam yudh, for their political, economic, cultural, and religious demands.

Further morchas included the Rasta Roko, Kamm Roko, and Rail Roko morchas; with the exception of the Rasta Roko morcha in which some 20 protesters were killed in police firing, all others had ended peacefully.

The Dharam Yudh Morcha was launched later that year on 4 August, following an Akali Dal meeting in July at Amritsar; Bhindranwale and Jathedar Jagdev Singh Talwandi were persuaded to lead it under the Akali Dal banner and the leadership of Longowal, to whom Bhindranwale swore loyalty. The movement began with Akalis courting arrest with a large number of volunteers.

During the implementation of various agricultural restrictions under Congress, the Akali Dal had accomplished little in response, and in addition, the possibility of forging an Akali-Congress partnership in Punjab was being privately explored. This caused the decline of support for the Akalis and the concurrent increase of support for Bhindranwale's message among both educated orthodox Sikhs and the rural population, along with what was increasingly seen as the ineffectual Akali approach of protests and inter-party collaboration in producing results for Punjab, leaving open a political space for those who argued that increased militancy was the only means for protecting Sikh interests.

The Akali movement gained momentum in August and September, and the government began to run out of room in jails for the over 25,000 volunteer protesters. Over 100,000 protesters would be arrested over the course of the morcha. The central government, instead of preempting any Akali agitation in regard to the Punjab by constitutionally referring all the legal issues to the Supreme Court, which the Akali Dal had demanded, played up the threat of extremism and law and order, and appeared disinclined to solve the issues justly or constitutionally. As late as May 1984, the Congress government continued to frame the protest as a religion-based stir, as opposed to a comprehensive movement driven by political, economic, and territorial issues central to the Declaration and in the interests of all residents of Punjab. The considered view of the Governor of West Bengal sent to Punjab, B. D. Pande, that a political problem required a political solution, went unheeded.

In response to demands that the Supreme Court be consulted in regards to concerns that the center was unconstitutionally usurping water from Punjab, the central government found loopholes to circumvent such a demand, instead offering a tribunal, which did not have the authority to override the Punjab Reorganization Act to begin with, and never issued a final decision over an issue critical to agricultural growth and state development.

Later, in May 1984, one day after an Akali procession in Amritsar against a ban on tobacco and meat products in the vicinity of the Golden Temple, the Hindi Suraksha Samiti, which had been formed in response to the Akali protest, organized a counterdemonstration in favor of tobacco.

=== Police ===
The Punjab Police, due to colonial policing traditions different than those in the rest of the country, which resulted from being from the last region to be annexed by the British (in 1849) and the extremely turbulent early years of British rule, had had much more free rein to act than in other provinces; the influence of those policies persisted after independence. The police would react to incidents by rounding up and illegally detaining suspects in large numbers for prolonged aggressive interrogation, often killing detainees in staged encounters. There was little faith in complaint inquiries from ordinary citizens, due to lawless police activity having tacit approval from the state police leadership.

Under the pretext of maintaining law and order, central state actions in the form of false encounters, tortures and killings in police custody, as well as extrajudicial police invasions and oppressive lockdowns in rural Punjab, increased. It became known that during the period, certain police officials and others had been guilty of excesses or violence. Atrocities committed by named officers were narrated in open meetings by Bhindranwale or the concerned victims, but neither the charges of the victims, reports to the authorities, nor other complaints were responded to by the administration to rectify current complaints or improve future procedures, much less for punishing the offenders. This perceived official apathy and callousness led many began to believe that what was happening was at the behest of the administration, and that state violence was being practiced to defame Sikhs to turn public opinion in order to sidetrack the real issues of state resources and constitutional procedure, as neither issues nor reported rights violations were being addressed. Bhindranwale spoke of staged crimes, in which Sikhs were accused of theft or violence, with the intention of linking the falsely accused to Bhindranwale, with any declared act being said to be on his orders, and that many of the Sikhs arrested on false accusations were tortured and killed. Accusations of violent force on the Sikhs also included the earlier burning of buses belonging to the Damdami Taksal containing Sikh scriptures, and Sikh train passengers being singled out and beaten on false pretenses.

Out of 220 deaths during the first 19 months of the Dharam Yudh Morcha, 190 had been Sikhs, with over 160 Sikhs killed during the first 16 months, with the Akalis alleging that reactive killings were being done by agent provocateurs, and reports appearing that such communal incidents had been initiated by Congress to inflame Hindu feelings. Despite emphatic demands for a detailed judicial inquiry, the central government was unwilling to initiate any such process. Extrajudicial killings by the police of orthodox Sikh youth in rural areas during the summer and winter of 1982 and early 1983 resulted in retaliatory violence. Bhindranwale accused Indira Gandhi of sending Darbara Singh, former Congress chief minister of Punjab, to "wreak atrocities on the Sikh nation."

Bhindranwale was particularly upset about the police atrocities and the murder of scores of Sikhs in the garb of false and contrived police encounters. He was often heard criticizing the double standards of the Government in treating Hindu and Sikh victims of violence, citing various incidents like the immediate appointment of an inquiry committee to probe Lala Jagat Narain's murder while not for the killing of the Sikhs, including the firing on peaceful Sikh protesters in the successful Rasta Roko agitation on 4 April 1983, killing 24, believing that this partisan behavior of the Government was bound to hasten the process of alienation of the Sikhs. He reprimanded the press for suppressing incidences of police atrocities, and of the double standards of dealing with Sikhs.

A team sponsored by the PUCL, with Justice V. M. Tarkunde as chairman and famed journalist Kuldip Nayar as a member, to assess the police excesses against Sikhs. It reported:

"We had no hesitation in saying in our report that the police had behaved like a barbarian force out for revenge. They had even set houses of a few absconders on fire and destroyed utensils, clothes and whatever else they found in them. Relatives of the absconders were harassed and even detained. Even many days after the excesses committed by the police, we could see how fear-stricken the people were. Villagers gave us the names of some of the police sub-inspectors and deputy superintendents involved; some of them, they said, had a reputation of taking the law into their hands.”

In the words of Mark Tully and Satish Jacob, BBC correspondents, these deadly encounters were justified as a reasonable method of avoiding lengthy court trials:

"There was a series of what the Indian police call 'encounters'- a euphemism for cold-blooded murder by the police. Darbara Singh admitted as much to us."

Though Akali demands were largely for the developmental welfare of the state of Punjab as a whole, with demands only made to the government and not in regards to other communities, police killings, including extrajudicial actions of fatal torture and mutilations of detainees, with some subsequently declared as escapees, as well as unprovoked attacks on innocent individual Sikhs, were carried out by mobs of the Hindi Suraksha Samiti, mobilized by the Arya Samaj. These incidents sparked off retributory attacks against them by Sikh youths. After the launch of the Dharam Yudh Morcha, and subsequent governmental inaction in regards to police brutality, Sikh activists began committing retaliatory acts of political violence. An assassination attempt was made on Chief Minister of Punjab Darbara Singh and two Indian Airlines flights were hijacked.

Following protester deaths, Swaran Singh restarted negotiations on behalf of Gandhi with the Akalis after releasing all arrested Akali volunteers, reaching agreements on Chandigarh, river waters, Centre-State relations, and the Amritsar broadcast, which were approved by a cabinet subcommittee. While Swaran Singh relayed the government's approval of the agreement, Gandhi had changed it significantly before submitting it to Parliament. The talks would collapse after this action, and Longowal would announce in November 1982 the continuation of the protests in Delhi during the 1982 Asian Games. Another round of talks between the Akalis and Congress MP Amrinder Singh was successful, but was sabotaged by Bhajan Lal, the Chief Minister of Haryana, who stated that protests, which were largely stifled, would not be allowed in Haryana during the event, and ensured that Sikhs allowed to pass through, regardless of social position, whether retired military, politician, or ordinary citizen, were subjected to various procedures including invasive friskings and removal of turbans; Sikhs travelling from Punjab to Delhi or back were indiscriminately stopped, searched, and humiliated, and Sikhs understood this humiliation not just individually but as a community; according to journalist Kuldip Nayyar, "from that day their feeling of alienation [had] been increasing." A few months after the Asian Games, anti-Sikh riots in Panipat on 14 February 1983 resulted in many Sikh deaths, damage to property of Sikhs, and extensive damage to gurdwaras, during which the state police remained inactive.

Bhindranwale, then regarded as the "single most important Akali leader," announced that nothing less than full implementation of the Anandpur resolution was acceptable to them. The Sikh volunteers who answered his call on 3 September 1983 were not satisfied with either the methods or the results of Longowal's methods, as a rift emerged between the two leaders, with Bhindranwale referring to Longowal's rooms in the Golden Temple complex as "Gandhi Niwas" ("Gandhi residence"), and Longowal referring to his rooms as a wild "Chambal" region. Bhindranwale would denounce the double standard of Congress-supporting hijackers, who had demanded the release of Indira Gandhi after her post-Emergency arrest, being rewarded with seats in the Uttar Pradesh legislative assembly, while demanding punishment for Sikh protesters who had done the same. He would comment in 1982, "If the Pandey brothers in Uttar Pradesh hijack a plane for a woman (Mrs. Gandhi) they are rewarded with political positions. If the Sikhs hijack a plane to Lahore and that too for a cause, they are dubbed traitors. Why two laws for the same crime?"

With the release of Amrik Singh in July 1983, Bhindranwale felt confident of the advancement of the movement without the Akali leadership; they would part ways in December, two months after the imposition of President's rule. By this time he had grown into a "veritable icon" among the Sikh masses, attracting a number of followers even among academics and professionals, with his taped sermons heard all over rural Punjab, as the masses began to look to him as "their only hope against an uncaring government and an oppressive police." Bhindranwale also castigated the Akalis in his speeches for their lack of adequate action in response to Sikh suffering, after their mistreatment at the Asian Games, anti-Sikh riots on 14 February 1983 in Panipat targeting Sikhs and gurdwaras, which led to significant loss of Sikh life and property and extensive damage to gurdwaras, with local police looking on without taking action. Such incidents lent credence to Bhindranwale's approach, that the Akalis were ineffectual beggars for redress of Sikh grievances, and that "the Khalsa always fights for his rights but never begs."

== Media coverage ==
Bhindranwale expected misrepresentation from reporters, telling the press, “I know what you are going to print, that you are only working for rupees.” He regarded the media as being puppets for the central government, granting interviews chiefly to reach other Sikhs. Bhindranwale became the focus of press attacks for any violence that took place in Punjab, while police atrocities and torture went unreported. He is said to have once remarked, “Even if a fly is killed in Punjab, it is blamed on me.” He criticized the coverage by journalists who he had held audience with as distorted, denying that he had ever had anyone killed, and emphasizing that every strident statement he had made had always been in response to provocation by other parties; in an interview with Shekhar Gupta in December 1983:

"Parliament is agitated by what I said last week. The ruling party, the Opposition, they all condemned me. But did anyone take note of the fact that I had only reacted to the threat to the Sikhs in Rajasthan by the Jai Hindu Sangh? I challenge you, examine all my statements. Each one has been in reaction to what someone else said first. Someone else brandishes a lathi, and just because we try to shield ourselves we are held guilty." "That is the game. A Hindu does something and you dismiss him as a petty criminal or communal fanatic. A Sikh does something and you malign the whole community."

In early 1982, he addressed in a speech at a college in Karnal, Haryana, about his perception on the constant distortions by the press::

“You have learnt from the newspapers, the news, and propaganda by ignorant people, that Bhindranwale is an extremist; that he is a dangerous man, a communalist; that he kills Hindus, There are many Hindus sitting here. You should carefully note how many I injure and how many I kill before leaving. You will be with me. Keep listening attentively. Having listened, do think over who are the communalists: whether they are the turban-wearers or your newspaper owners, the Mahasha (Arya Samaj) Press. Follow your own logic.” (Note: A 1983 report on the Punjab situation by Sathananthan et al. attributes most of the communalism of the region to Arya Samaj writings and activity sice its inception. As described by G. S. Dhillon: "Another factor that inflamed the position was the active association of the Arya Samaj leaders. Many of them were influential Congressmen, who openly sided with the Nirankaris and indulged in very unfortunate propaganda against the Sikhs. That the Arya Samaj leadership and their influence has been a very major factor in the Hindu-Sikh relations and increasing the gravity of the Punjab situation is also evidenced in the report. 'Hindu-Sikh Conflict In Punjab: Cause and Cure' by S.M. Sathananthan (London). K.T. Lalwani (London), S. Raghunath lyenger (Lagos). Prof. G.P. Manuskhani (Bombay), Asha Bhatnagar (Jaipur) et al. These persons belonging to different professions came all the way from far off places to personally study the Punjab situation. They moved from place to place in the State and met a cross section of the people and concluded as under: 'The present Hindu-Sikh conflict is the saddest tragedy of post-partition Indian History. Its genesis lies in a narrow-minded attitude of certain sections of the community, that totally refutes the traditional Hindu virtues of tolerance and understanding. One also wonders, why the Sikhs are always pushed into agitation for their basic constitutional demands, the kind of which were never denied to other States and communities. Why was Punjab the last linguistic State to be formed (10 years late)? Why is Punjab the only state in India whose capital Chandigarh is governed by the Central Government? There are many such unanswered questions which deserve serious probing and full national exposure. Indian news agencies and papers will do well to investigate the reasons for Hindu-Sikh conflict arising from Hindu opposition to Sikh demands, even though their demands were made to the Government (and not to the Hindus of Punjab and Haryana). While most of the Sikh demands are for the welfare of Punjab State, not one demand is anti-Hindu or hurts Hindu sentiments in any way.' According to G. P. Mansukhani: 'If you were to trace the background of a reporter or an editor behind a particular anti-Sikh report, you would probably find him to be an Arya-Samajist. Late Lala Jagat Narain's persistent role in anti-Sikh activities (including that of his support to the Nirankaris) and his staunch communal tendencies were clearly reflected in his popular daily newspaper in Punjab.'")

Bhindranwale also referenced the double standards of the media in the failure to register cases against prominent Hindu politicians for making threatening statements against Sikhs, including Swami Adityavesh, an Arya Samaji Congress MLA, who demanded that Sikhs be expelled from Haryana to Punjab, Kewal Krishan, a Congress MLA in Punjab, who threatened to destroy all Sikh organizations, and Harbans Lal Khanna, a BJP MLA in Punjab, who stated publicly in Amritsar on 30 May 1981, "Dukki tikki khehan nahin deni, sir te pagri rehan nahin deni; kachh, kara, kirpaan; ehnoon bhejo Pakistan." ('We are not going to let any second or third group exist, we are not going to let a turban remain on any head; the shorts, the iron bangle, the sword, send these to Pakistan’), and had a model of the Golden Temple desecrated by a mob, Baldev Prakash, also a BJP MLA, who had posters of such slogans printed. and extremist president of the Hindi Suraksha Samiti in Patiala, Pawan Kumar Sharma, backed by the Arya Samaj press and furtively by the Congress party, with links to Bhajan Lal, who in a raid had been discovered with large stocks of arms, explosives, and hand grenades. Amrik Singh would also allude to the double standard of the government's soft behavior towards Dhirendra Brahmachari, who had smuggled 500 guns through Jammu from Spain, in contrast with the government's concern with the Sikhs; Amrik Singh would also state that "Delhi likes Sikhs like Zail Singh and Buta Singh who pay court to the Government. All other Sikhs are called extremists. We don't want secession but seek status of first-class citizens."

=== Incidents ===
Regarding incidents of bus passengers shooting in the state in October 1983 and other crimes, the discovery of discarded turbans often used as handties, alcohol, pistols, and cartridges found at certain crime scenes, which would come to be regarded as telltale signs of staging, prompted open Akali allegations that killings were being done by professionals under the orders of the Third Agency, an intelligence wing formed by Indira Gandhi during the Emergency, looking for a pretext to impose President's rule in Punjab, which she did on 6 October, allowing no time for investigation into the unclaimed act. Longowal himself repeatedly challenged the Government that he would prove that the Dhilwan shootings were not done by any Sikh or Akali if a judicial enquiry was conducted.

In addition to President's rule, Punjab would also come under the AFSPA in 1983, granting the army unrestrained powers, including to shoot on suspicion with immunity from prosecution.

According to former Punjab DGP Kirpal Dhillon, the incident was characterized by several unusual circumstances: the perpetrators had never been seriously tracked, the bus had not been a scheduled service and had deviated from its usual route, and the victims did not belong to sects and castes typical of the area, noting the possibility of it being authorized by Congress ministers and managed through the police and central agency. Darbara Singh was finally dismissed by Zail Singh after the incident, the first of its kind. The entire spectrum of Sikh groups condemned the incident "in the strongest possible terms," though a section of the Jalandhar media nevertheless persisted in making "fairly explicit insinuations" of Sikh militant involvement.

After another such incident at Khabi Rajputan with 4 deaths on 18 November, "The government of India, as well as a "major section of the so-called mainstream media," promptly held the Akalis, Bhindranwale, and the Sikh extremist elements responsible for the two incidents. Several Sikh leaders, including Longowal and Bhindranwale, had also "severely deplored" a 21 October train derailment, "allegedly due to sabotage," resulting in the death of 19 passengers.

Bhindranwale, as well as all militant groups, would "squarely and unequivocally" condemn the two bus shootings, the 21 October train derailment, and such episodes of violence, demanding a judicial inquiry into the spate of events during the month. Even radical Sikh groups, which normally did not shy away from claiming responsibility for violence, denied any role in bus killings or desecrations and condemned them "in no uncertain terms," with the Babbar Khalsa denouncing the "killing of any Hindus, robberies, or any religiously provocative acts." According to them, their targets were only either Sant Nirankaris involved in 1978, of whom they had claimed 35 by that time, or police officers who were deemed guilty of "torturing and humiliating" detained Sikh youth and harassing their "women, relatives and friends." Nevertheless, the media apparatus would "[run] amuck, declaring that "Bhindranwale's Sikhs" had opened hostilities against all Hindus;" despite the incidents never being solved, the media and subsequent public opinion would be convinced of this narrative. Bhindranwale would state, "It suits the government to publicize me as an extremist, thus making an excuse to frustrate the just cause and the legitimate demands of the entire Sikh community and Punjab state."

The spate of incidents in 1983, including Dhilwan, were widely suspected to be false flags; the political magazine Surya, patronized by the BJP party, substantiated many such suspicions in detailed reports about the role of the Third Agency, detailing the career trajectories of various operatives and plans to replicate the "Punjab model" to other burgeoning conflict zones, including Sri Lanka. A 21 November 1983 editorial of the leading paper The Tribune, noted certain "inescapable conclusions" about the two bus incidents: that such acts were not sponsored by the Sikhs as a community, that Bhindranwale had "condemned the killings" as had Longowal, and that President's Rule had failed to deter such incidents, with the perpetrators "remain[ing] unidentified." When bomb blasts took place at mandirs or cows discovered there, all Sikh religious and political formations, including Bhindranwale, "lost no time severely condemning the misdeeds and calling for high-level inquiries."

It had become common practice for the police to blame any rise in common crime on "whatever special category of criminals are then operating, in this case Sikh extremism," whenever they could not find suspects; regarding robberies, the Delhi establishment continued to insinuate that it was Sikh terrorists, emboldened by and linked to Akali agitations, who were principally to blame for all extremist crime including bank robberies, with little evidence of such. In fact, occasional statements issued by top police officials in Punjab tended to indicate otherwise, like a 2 October 1983 special report in the Indian Express, quoting Sube Singh, the police chief of Ludhiana, as claiming that "Sikh extremists are not involved in the recent bank robberies committed in Punjab during the past few months.... Mr Sube Singh told ENS here on Friday that some gangs of robbers from Delhi and other states which had links with Punjab, committed bank robberies as the police had been busy in dealing with the Akali agitation and other acts of violence."

In fact, many such killings that took place between December 1983 and June 1984 were rather the result of personal vendettas, and fundamentalist groups not affiliated, and often opposed, to Bhindranwale, including the Dal Khalsa and Babbar Khalsa, who claimed responsibility for most crimes blamed on Bhindranwale, who denied responsibility for all such acts. Meanwhile, hundreds of individual Sikhs, even many who were not politically involved, had been harassed, beaten and killed in communal mob incidents, and tortured, imprisoned, and killed by police forces for the previous two years during the Dharam Yudh Morcha, amidst lack of government action. A report by S. M. Sathananthan et al. characterized the actions of extremists opposing constitutional Sikh demands as fueled by "one-sided anti-Sikh misinformation from various news agencies." Bhindranwale had commented in 1983:

"Someone killed seven Hindus in a bus. No Sikh has said this was good, everyone deplored it. But because seven Hindus had died, even twenty-four hours didn't pass. The Ministry was dissolved. President's rule was imposed. The region declared as disturbed. However, one hundred and fifty Sikhs died and one man was not charged. Now all of you Sikhs should sit down and figure out as to what the thoughts of this Government of the Hindus are about the turban and the beard."

B.D. Pande, who was appointed Governor of Punjab from 10 October 1983 to 27 June 1984 during President's rule, criticized the methods of the central leadership, especially that of Indira Gandhi, who he characterized as having "introduced what was called the amoral theory in Indian politics," as well as "Hindu hardliners and vernacular press for contributing to the false narrative." He also blamed the rivalry between Congress officials President Zail Singh and Punjab CM Darbara Singh for the course of events, and advocated for a political settlement with the militants up until Operation Blue Star.

=== Press disinformation ===
B. G. Verghese and K. C. Kulish, senior journalists deputed by the Editors Guild of India, filed a report after visiting Punjab in February 1984 denouncing the tendency to reflexively attribute any uptick in even normal crime to whichever special category of outlaws operated at the time, writing, "Objection is taken in Punjab to the tendency to ascribe all crime to Sikh extremists. The press must be wary of such stereotypes. Many crimes, robberies and murders have little to do with the current political scene."

There would be significant government interference in information released to the media itself. The Congress government strove significantly to manipulate raw material; its disseminations would serve to form two parallel, diametrically opposed perceptions in Punjab. The Indian establishment also sought to mould popular perceptions about the developments in Punjab to correspond to its own, done through media management by plenty of operators in the ruling party itself. According to sociology professor Birinder Pal Singh, "Besides projecting the Punjab problem as communal, the media, official and non-official, branded the Sikhs as "communal," "terrorists," "separatists," and disintegrationists," as "those who want "expulsion of the Hindus from Punjab" and "want India's dismemberment at the hands of its enemy Pakistan," etc. to name a few. Such projections was not just the work of certain communal organizations but was a goal of the state itself, to legitimize the use of force and state repression to settle the "Punjab problem." By the time of Operation Blue Star, almost the entire mainstream media and political establishment had come to largely accept the government position and Hindu political outfits on the Punjab situation, forming a "national consensus."

It was noted that during the era of the 1970s and 1980s, indiscriminate anti-Sikh bias in reporting, without distinction made between the whole community or Sikh political factions, "of a number of newspaper owners, editors and journalists," including "[e]ven senior editors and columnists," also contributed to "Sikh disenchantment." Along with national attitudes in the Hindi-speaking region "hardening along communal lines" because of government manipulation, the national newspapers reported on the Sikhs "in the exciting sport of bringing the communal cauldron to a boil through sensational comment," with The Times of India and The Hindustan Times "doing more to incite hostility between Hindus and Sikhs than perhaps any other English-language newspaper."

In an 26 July 1982 editorial piece of the Spokesman Weekly, it was noted that, "when a Hindu, for his misdeeds, is killed on the road side, his co-religionist, without ascertaining identity of the culprit, gang up and go and set fire to the Dailies run by the Sikhs; if some one places a cow's head in front of a mandir, they instead of pushing it away, immediately rush to stone the Darbar Sahib or throw biris in the gurdwaras," while "[on] the other hand, when a large number of Sikhs are killed as it happened at Amritsar, Chowk Mehta, Delhi, Kanpur, etc., no one is worried — the Press becomes dumb, and the Government (of the people) behaves in a manner as if nothing has happened."

According to Cynthia Keppley Mahmood, "The clearly distorted account of the event released to the media does not speak well for India's vaunted freedom of press. Stories of prostitutes and drugs at the Akal Takht were printed on front pages one week, that recanted in back pages the next. A story suggesting that Bhindranwale had committed suicide was followed by one describing his body as riddled with bullets from head to toe. There is no doubt that an entire apparatus of fear dissemination worked to convince India that the Sikhs were to be distrusted. And by and large, it succeeded," adding that "Compromises with press freedom were accompanied by draconian legislation that was a target of criticism from human rights communities around the world." Such fabrications would continue to be peddled as fact long after.

According to a journalist traveling with Bhindranwale during 1982, the Central intelligence department, or CID, which had taped every public speech listening for "seditious" remarks, had heard none by April 1982, and Darbara Singh, despite being ready to "act" against Bhindranwale, had found no grounds to do so. A senior officer in Chandigarh in December 1983 confessed, "It's really shocking that we have so little against him while we keep blaming him for all sorts of things. You certainly cannot assault the temple on the basis of just these charges, get hundreds of people killed and get away with it."

== Relocation to the Akal Takht ==
In July 1982, at the start of the Dharam Yudh Morcha, the President of Shiromani Akali Dal, Harchand Singh Longowal had invited Bhindranwale to take up residence at the Golden Temple compound. He called Bhindranwale "our stave to beat the government." On 19 July 1982, Bhindranwale took residence with approximately 200 armed followers in the Guru Nanak Niwas guest house, on the precincts of the Golden Temple. Bhindranwale developed a reputation as a man of principle who could settle people's problems about land, property or any other matter without needless formality or delay, more expediently than the legal system. The judgement would be accepted by both parties and carried out. This added to his popularity. Bhindranwale led the campaign in Punjab from the complex guest house, from where he met and was interviewed by international television crews.

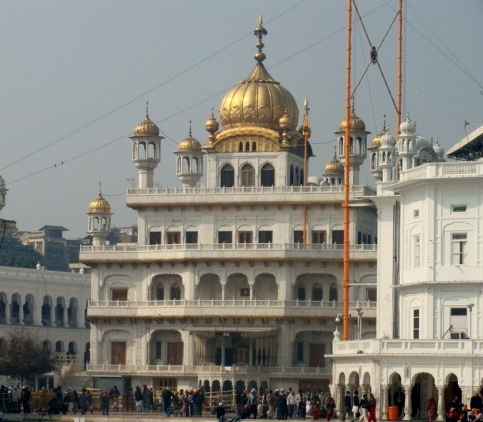
Bhindranwale and his followers moved to the Akal Takht complex in December 1983

On April 25, 1983, DIG Atwal was shot on the steps of the Darbar Sahib complex at point-blank range, then turned over by the assassins to ensure death, even as security guards stood just about 100 feet away. The assassination was never solved. The government promptly blamed militant groups, though all militant factions, as well as the Akalis, Bhindranwale, who "vehemently refuted all such imputations and condemned the misdeed in no uncertain terms," as did Harminder Sandhu of the AISSF. In a joint statement issued with Longowal, both implicated Darbara Singh for the incident. All immediately and vehemently denied all accusations and unequivocally condemned the incident.

Bhindranwale described it as being "the handiwork of the Government to malign Sikhs" and a pretext to raid the Golden Temple complex. Subsequent disclosures revealed that Atwal had in fact met with the Akalis and Bhindranwale for "secret" talks which would have potentially paved the way for a joint Akali-Congress government led by Parkash Singh Badal. To prevent this power-sharing arrangement, either militants who sought the full implementation of the Anandpur Sahib Resolution and revenge for police operations, or the Congress faction of the Chief Minister Darbara Singh, to prevent his imminent removal from his post by Indira Gandhi which the Akalis had been demanding, had both had motive to commit the act.

Bhindranwale was not alone in suspecting government involvement. On the assassination, Longowal stated, "Whenever the situation becomes ripe for settlement, some violent incident takes place. I think there is a government conspiracy behind the DIG's murder." When asked who could be responsible, he implied Darbara Singh's involvement: "The one who is afraid of losing his seat (of power);" observers had noted that Darbara Singh had been on the verge of being replaced by the Congress high command, partly on Akali request and partly due to ineptitude. Bhindranwale condemned it as "the handiwork of the Punjab [Congress] government," and "an attempt to foil the Akali agitation and to malign the Sikhs." The president of the AISSF termed the shooting "anti-Sikh" and carried out by certain elements in the Congress party, demanding a judicial inquiry.

The CRPF, a central paramilitary police force, had been deployed in Punjab during President's rule as an alternative to the Punjab Police, who due to its mostly Jatt Sikh composition were seen with apprehension by the central government, which imposed a recruitment ban on it for a time. CRPF troops first fired on the Golden Temple in February 1984 following the Panipat riots the same month, furthering misgivings among Sikhs. The Punjab Police, traditionally seen as oppressive, were briefly seen by Sikhs as a counterbalance to the CRPF, even resulting in frayed relations and even a few clashes between the two forces, before the militancy would take off after Blue Star when it would again become the primary opposing force. When J S Aurora had visited the Golden Temple with his wife in December 1983, while Bhindranwale was living in the Guru Nanak Niwas, and looked at various areas of the complex, he had noticed no defensive preparations anywhere. Visiting again on 24 February the next year, when Bhindranwale had moved to the Akal Takht building, he only saw sandbags on the langar complex which "did not appear very formidable," which he was told was placed for protection after the CRPF had fired on the complex in February. He would visit again a month after the operation, attributing the professional defenses that had been built between March and June to Shabeg Singh who had served under him.

Reportedly, militants responsible for bombings and murders were taking shelter in some gurdwaras in Punjab. In turn, some members of the Congress-led Punjab assembly alleged that the murder in the temple premises confirmed the charges that the extremists were being sheltered and given active support in religious places and the Guru Nanak Niwas, and that Bhindranwale was openly supporting such elements. However, the central government would later claim that it could not enter the gurdwaras for the fear of hurting Sikh sentiments. After President's rule was imposed in Punjab, the burning of a gurdwara at Churu, Rajasthan by the Jai Hindu Sangh on 26 November increased the violence, and on 14 February the Hindi Suraksha Samiti vandalized a train station by destroying a model of the Golden Temple and pictures of the Sikh gurus. Anti-Sikh mob violence in Haryana from 15 to 20 February 1984, mobilized by CM Bhajan Lal at the behest of leaders in Delhi, and the killing of eight Sikhs in Panipat on 19 February in view of the police station, provoked retaliations.

As the days went by the law and order situation further deteriorated and violence escalated. While the Akalis pressed on with their two-pronged strategy of negotiations and massive campaigns of civil disobedience directed at the Central Government, others were not so enamoured of nonviolence. Communists known as "Naxalites", and armed Sikh groups – the "Babbar Khalsa" and "Dal Khalsa", both of which opposed Bhindranwale, sometimes worked hand in hand and clashed with the police. A covert government group known as the Third Agency was also engaged in dividing and destabilising the Sikh movement through the use of undercover officers, paid informants and agents provocateurs. Bhindranwale himself always kept a revolver and wore a cartridge belt and encouraged his followers to be armed. However, a Chandigarh officer in an interview with the December 1983 issue of India Today explained that the worst offense Bhindranwale could be accused of was "harsh speech rhetoric."

The earliest demands for army intervention, under the guise of terms like "martial law," "army rule," "army takeover, and "imposition of Emergency," were made by organizations like the RSS, Hindi Suraksha Samiti, and the BJP. Later joined by other outwardly secular parties, the Congress would seek to consolidate its vote bank along communal lines. During the debate in the Parliament of India members of both the houses demanded the arrest of Bhindranwale. Sensing a prospect of his arrest from the hostel premises, he convinced the SGPC president Tohra to set up his headquarters on the Akal Takht complex. While the move was supported by Gurcharan Singh Tohra, an Akali who was then President of the SGPC, it was opposed by Harchand Singh Longowal, leader of the Akali political party. On 15 December 1983, Bhindranwale was asked to move out of Guru Nanak Niwas house by members of the Babbar Khalsa who acted with Longowal's support. Longowal by now feared for his own safety. Tohra then convinced the high priest to allow Bhindranwale to reside in Akal Takht. On 15 December 1983, Bhindranwale and his supporters moved to the Akal Takht complex and began fortifying the complex with sand bags and light weaponry. Longowal attempted to block the move by persuading Giani Kirpal Singh, then Jathedar (head priest) of the Akal Takht, to use his authority and issue a Hukamnama (edict) disallowing Bhindranwale from relocating to the complex. The temple high priest protested this move as a sacrilege since no Guru or leader ever resided in Akal Takht that too on the floor above Granth Sahib but Tohra agreed to prevent Bhindranwale's arrest, In the end, while Giani Kirpal Singh did protest the move, Bhindranwale's was permitted to relocate. as Bhindranwale believed that the Morcha leader Longowal was negotiating with the government for his arrest. By December 1983, Bhindranwale and his followers, now joined by senior ex-military personnel like Major general Shabeg Singh, retired Major General J.S. Bhullar, retired Brigadier Mohinder Singh, and others, had made the Golden Temple complex an armoury and headquarters, fortifying it with sandbags in preparation for a siege. Mark Tully and Satish Jacob wrote, "All terrorists were known by name to the shopkeepers and the householders who live in the narrow alleys surrounding the Golden Temple... the Punjab police must have known who they were also, but they made no attempt to arrest them. By this time Bhindranwale and his men were above the law." However, Bhindranwale presented himself, along with over 50 of his supporters, at the Deputy Commissioner's residence on the day he moved to the Darbar Sahib complex, revealing his purpose in moving there was not to hide from the law, as the District Magistrate at Amritsar, until shortly before the invasion, was on record as having assured the Governor of the state that he could arrest anyone in Darbar Sahib at any time, though not seeing a need to.

=== Early 1984 ===
On 8 February 1984, the Akalis held a successful bandh to demonstrate their strength and continued commitment to non-violent struggle. The following week, a tripartite talk with five cabinet ministers, five Akali leaders, and fifteen leaders from opposition parties came close to a successful settlement, but was deliberately sabotaged once again by Bhajan Lal with more anti-Sikh violence in Haryana. This was followed by Akali to express frustration in further protests, leading to their arrest along with many volunteers. On 25 May 1984, Longowal announced another morcha to be initiated on 3 June the day Operation Blue Star would be launched, practicing civil disobedience by refusing to pay land revenue, water or electricity bills, and block the flow of grain out of Punjab. Gandhi's emissaries met Akali leaders on 27 May to once again suggest the negotiation of a settlement, but though the Akalis showed signs of yielding, Bhindranwale would accept nothing short of the full implementation of the Anandpur Sahib Resolution.

According to Gandhi's principal secretary P. C. Alexander, it would be Longowal's announcement of withholding Punjabi grain and tax from the central government that had been the true "last straw" for Gandhi to send the army when she did, as opposed to any militancy.

In the midst of the protests, police violence, and the burgeoning insurgency ensuing, it would be increasingly clear that the government would seek a military rather than a political solution to the unrest in Punjab, and Bhindranwale would instruct the people to be prepared for a showdown with the government. Jarnail Singh Bhindranwale had with himself a group of devoted followers armed with firearms who served as his bodyguards and acolytes, occasionally as willing and unpaid assassins. Bhindranwale urged all Sikhs to buy weapons and motorcycles, which would be helpful to fight state oppression, instead of spending on television sets. He believed that amritdharis (baptized Sikhs) should also be shastradharis (weapon bearers), as had been required by Guru Gobind Singh for defensive purposes. Bhindranwale and Amrik Singh started carrying firearms at all times, hearkening to the Sikh religious duty of carrying a kirpan, which is also a weapon, and police brutality on Sikh protesters. Upon the imposition of President's rule and the designation of Punjab as a disturbed area, the police were given broad powers to search, arrest, and shoot whom they would, immune from legal action.

In response to the anti-Sikh violence, Bhindranwale had exhorted Sikh youth to spend money on self-defense, by obtaining a motorcycle and revolver instead of luxury goods. He would state,

Being armed, there is no greater sin for a Sikh than attacking an unarmed person, killing an innocent person, looting a shop, harming the innocent, or wishing to insult anyone's daughter or sister. Also, being armed, there is no greater sin than not seeking justice."

The media, however, would distort this as a call to arms, in the interest of sensationalist headlines. Indira Gandhi began to use the term "extremists," a term meant to push Punjab back into line with the government, Sikhs were relieved of duty from police and military forces in large numbers. Sikhs in government positions were profiled by police across India from the 1970s to the 1990s, who arrested and tortured suspected criminals at will.

On 12 May 1984, Ramesh Chander, son of Lala Jagat Narain and editor of Hind Samachar group was alleged by Kuldip Nayar to have been murdered by "supporters" of Bhindranwale. Lala's paper had had a "shrill tone when reporting on Sikh issues," and "was widely dubbed pro-Hindu," with its "tone" changing only subsequently. In 1989, seven editors and seven news hawkers and newsagents were assassinated. Punjab Police had to provide protection to the entire distribution staff and scenes of armed policemen escorting news hawkers on their morning rounds became common.

The Babbar Khalsa were opposed to Bhindranwale and his initial strategy of opting to join the Akalis' protest movement for Punjab's rights instead of immediately pursuing more militant means; it was more focused on propagating its view of Sikh religious life than on politics and states' rights, and contested with Bhindranwale for dominance of the movement. The rivalry intensified in April and May 1984, with the two groups blaming each other for several assassinations. Bhindranwale would subsequently be regarded as the head of the movement.

=== Hitlist claims ===
Stories of a "hitlist" had begun to circulate after Atwal's death, much of which was "exaggerated." While admitting the absence of evidence of such from either themselves or "anyone [they had] talked to," Tully and Jacob asserted its existence. Tavleen Singh surmised the existence of the "hitlist" when Bichu Ram, a police officer who had hacked off the beard of a Sikh named Lehar Singh and sent him to Bhindranwale as a challenge, was killed six months later.

According to police records, up until Blue Star, the number of people killed or injured in "terrorist violence" exceeded just "fifty persons." This included both police agents and informants as well as Hindus; among them were Arya Samaj communalist editor Lala Jagat Narain, his son and successor, managing editor Ramesh Chander, and BJP MLA Harbans Lal Khanna. Police assassinations included Deputy Superintendent of Police Bachan Singh, who along with A.S. Atwal had harassed Amrik Singh when he went to complain to the Punjab governor in Amritsar about the detainment of Bhindranwale's associates. After the governor expressed annoyance at the local officers, Bachan Singh had put Amrik Singh in custody and mistreated him in retaliation, trying to frame him for the Nirankari Gurbachan Singh murder. A third police official involved, D.R. Bhatti, narrowly escaped assassination. Earlier, two of Bhindranwale's men, Kulwant and Gurmit, had been killed in encounters.

Other assassinations included Bua Das on 7 February 1983, a Central Interrogation Agency inspector at Gurdaspur who was held responsible for harassing Sikhs in Gurdaspur and breaking the limbs of a number of Sikh youth in custody, as well as Inderpal Gupta, president of the Hindu Suraksha Samiti communalist group, killed in clashes on 17 April 1984.

While authorities blamed the Akalis and militants for the "deteriorating law and order," despite police ruthlessness against it, the Centre refused all inquiries or reports on the situation demanded by the Akalis and opposition parties. When opposition leaders, agitated over news reports, demanded action against Bhindranwale, union home minister P.C. Sethi produced a list of 45 suspects in GT complex in the House on 17 November 1983. When asked by an MP why Bhindranwale's name was not included, Sethi replied that such proclamations were made by the courts, independents of government whims, remaining silent when asked if the Centre had approached any court for such a proclamation.

The government itself, in order to justify starting Operation Blue Star on such a high-capacity religious day, would make such claims of intercepting communications that Bhindranwale and Shabeg Singh had instructed their followers to start killing Hindus in villages, all Punjabi MPs and members of the State Assembly "en masse" on 5 June 1984, allegations that the government would never give any hard evidence for.

On 14 April 1984 Surinder Singh Sodhi was killed while drinking tea in a shop in Amritsar by Surinder Singh Shinda and Baljit Kaur. Baljit Kaur had attempted to assassinate Jarnail Singh Bhindranwale on April 13, but backed out. Baljit Kaur, would go to the Golden Temple after the killing and confessed to the murder. Baljit Kaur would be interrogated by Bhidnranwale. She would allegedly admit to the other killer being her boyfriend Surinder Singh Shinda and to being paid 200,000 rupees by Gurcharan Singh, the general secretary of Akali Dal led by Harchand Singh Longowal, to do the killing. She also implicated others. Bhindranwale in a speech would say, "They (Akali Dal) killed our young men. They severed my right arm... I know what role that... played in seeking vergency for the martyrs". Bhindranwale and his men killed multiple individuals they held responsible. Baljit Kaur would be tortured and her breasts were cut off. Her limbs would be cut into pieces and the sack was abandoned near road by the Golden Temple. Bhatia, another accused by Bhindranwale, would initially be forgiven by Bhidnranwale, but would be later shot dead outside of Longowal's office. He put a signboard up in view of Longowal's office saying, "Sodhi's murder avenged within 48 hours. The other conspirators should look after themselves now." Longowal feared that he would be killed and managed to have Babbar Khalsa side with him. 130 Akali leaders and 40 SGPC members revolted against Longowal and sided with Bhindranwale. With this Akali Dal under Longowal and Indira Gandhi agreed they had to 'neutralize' Bhindranwale.

== Government maneuvers ==
The planning for Operation Blue Star was initiated long before Bhindranwale had relocated to the complex in December 1983 and begun to fortify it running sand-model exercises for the attack on a Golden Temple replica in the Doon Valley over 18 months prior, and over 125 other Sikh shrines were simultaneously attacked. According to Gen. S.K. Sinha, it had not been a last resort, but on Gandhi's mind since after the 1982 Akali agitations. During publicly recorded speeches in May and July in 1983 (still several months before relocating to the Akal Takht and initiating efforts to fortify it) Bhindranwale warned that senior officers of the CID were planning to initially occupy Taksal and Nihang camps of Mehta, and gradually take control of the Golden Temple. A previous request to solicit the use of army personnel and tanks had been made by Chief Minister Darbara Singh and Prime Minister Gandhi to aid in the arrest of Bhindranwale at Mehta Chowk in 1982. However, then military commander Lt. Gen. S.K. Sinha, a "dear friend" of Major General Shabeg Singh, Bhindranwale's military advisor, viewed the request as "very strange" and advised against the use of military force considering the sanctity of the complex and potential repercussions. While Bhindranwale surrendered peacefully at Mehta Chowk, Sinha would opt for early retirement when the same request came again two years later for him to deploy tanks and army personnel to conduct Operation Blue Star, and what he advised against, his replacements Gen. A. S. Vaidya (selected by Gandhi to supersede Sinha) and Lt. Gen. Krishnaswamy Sundarji did "gladly."

The government made elaborate plans for an army action while feigning readiness for negotiations and denying any intention of sending armed forces inside the Darbar Sahib complex. Six additional divisions of the army including especially trained para commandos were inducted into Punjab by the end of May 1984. The government sent a team led by Narasimha Rao, which proved unsuccessful, as Bhindranwale's firm position was nothing short of full implementation of the Anandpur Sahib Resolution, rejecting, for instance, the offer to give Chandigarh to Punjab in exchange for areas of southwestern Punjab state, as Chandigarh had been promised exclusively to Punjab in a formal communication issued by the Union government on January 29, 1970. The Sikhs would ultimately withdraw, believing they had seen a commando unit move into the city. On 26 May, Tohra informed the government that Bhindranwale, who was convinced of the need to fight for Sikh rights, was beyond political maneuverings and in talks with state governor B. D. Pande, agreed to Bhindranwale's arrest, provided that the Darbar Sahib was not entered. though likely having not comprehended the severity of the impending attack. As Gandhi had no intention of implementing the Anandpur Sahib Resolution and feared the loss of Hindu electoral support, and as the Akali Dal also feared losing power, as over 40 SGPC members and 130 Akali leaders, including former legislators, had revolted against Longowal's leadership in favor of Bhindranwale, Akali Dal and central government interests had finally converged. Faced with imminent army action and with Longowal abandoning him, Bhindranwale declared "This bird is alone. There are many hunters after it".

Chandan Mitra wrote after observing the insurgency:

Looking back, I am not sure if Bhindranwale was a terrorist by conviction who seriously sought Punjab's separation from India through force or if he painted himself into a corner and became a puppet in the hands of Pakistan's ISI which was looking for a face to project in its war of a thousand cuts against India to avenge East Pakistan's dismemberment. Maybe he was carried away by crowds that thronged his pravachans in rural Punjab in which he railed against decrepit practices creeping into Sikhism and exaggeratedly spoke of the alleged betrayal of his community by New Delhi, particularly the "biba", meaning Indira Gandhi. In that sense, he was the latest in a long line of Sikh leaders who led episodic agitations to distance the faith from Hindu influences, worried that the preponderant assimilative thrust of Hinduism would overwhelm Sikhism the way it had done Jainism and Buddhism.

=== Negotiations ===
- Amarinder Singh, who had a close relationship with Indira Gandhi and her son Rajiv Gandhi, met with Bhindranwale on behalf of the government in 1982, serving as an MP in the Lok Sabha at the time. After abortive attempts to set up meetings between Bhindranwale and Indira Gandhi in Punjab and Delhi, as neither was willing to leave their territories, Amarinder Singh, on Bhindranwale's request, was able to arrange a meeting between Bhindranwale and Rajiv Gandhi in Punjab, also a Congress MP at the time who agreed to meet. Two meetings were planned, though neither took place as Rajiv failed to appear both times; both Amarinder and Rajiv had been summoned back by Indira each time as they were about to embark from Safdarjung Airport in Delhi. Amarinder believes that intelligence agencies induced Indira to interfere in the occurrence of both meetings.

Amarinder nevertheless continued efforts to keep negotiations with other parties going, often flying from Delhi to Punjab in a series of what the government called "secret talks" to continue to meet Bhindranwale and Longowal on various occasions, right up until the army operation. His 2017 autobiography states that:

"My first impression of Bhindranwale was that he was a very simple man," notes Amarinder. "He was very much open to discussion and ideas and gave the feeling that he was ready to listen and work for peace. You asked him a straight question and he gave you a straight reply. He was prepared to negotiate, but it was the politics [played by] the Centre and his growing popularity that kept him glued to his hard-line position and drove him to the point of no return."

On Bhindranwale's objectives, Amarinder states,

"At some stage, Bhindranwale had taken it upon himself to get the 1973 Anandpur Sahib Resolution passed. Incidentally, Bhindranwale had never asked for a separate Sikh state, but was fighting for the implementation of the 1973 resolution.... Bhindranwale, in fact, had always opined that he never asked for Khalistan, but if it was offered, the Sikhs would not give up the offer as they did during partition in August 1947."

- During the days before the assault, government representatives, led by Ambassador Daljit Singh Pannun, met with Bhindranwale in a last-ditch effort to avert the army operation, which Bhindranwale had agreed to initiate dialogue toward. Bhindranwale sought a commitment from Pannun that Sikh youths taken in captivity during the protest movement would no longer be tortured by police. He also sought comment from Gandhi stating that all the problems afflicting the state of Punjab would be resolved through mutual discussion; Pannun offered a window of one month to await comment while Bhindranwale offered one week; the parties settled on a window of ten days, during which Bhindranwale and his men would disarm. Bhindranwale warned of a backlash by the Sikh community in the event of an army assault on the Golden Temple, if the plan was sabotaged, and wanted assurance that if any mishap took place, that Gandhi would not blame his men. The documentation of the reports sent to the central government before Operation Blue Star reads, “We ended this meeting in utmost cordiality and understanding and were happy at the outcome. In fact, I found there was nothing that would frighten the government of India, nor anyone else.” Pannun asserted that Bhindranwale had repeatedly told him that he did not want Khalistan, that Bhindranwale was “grossly misunderstood,” and that had Pannun been treated with honesty and consideration (as he had been "kept in the dark about the impending army operation by vested interests"), Operation Blue Star would have never taken place, and "many innocent lives could have been saved." The comment awaited from Gandhi would never come.
- On the 30th anniversary of the operation, journalist Rajinder Puri disclosed that the "fundamental truth" of the operation being "deliberately or otherwise ignored" was the fact that it had been unnecessary because Bhindranwale had categorically agreed to a settlement acceptable to both the government and to Longowal exactly one month prior. Puri had personally met Bhindranwale, approached by fellow journalist Jatindra Tuli on behalf of Rajiv Gandhi for help in achieving a settlement with Bhindranwale, describing this as "not a new disclosure" but one that had been subsequently ignored. Puri met Rajiv Gandhi in the residence of Romi Chopra and consented to help, and through his brother General Prikshat Puri, contacted Bhindranwale's elder brother Captain Harcharan Singh Rode, decorated for valour in the 1965 war, who served under General Puri.

Agreeing to cooperate, Rode escorted Rajinder Puri from Rode's post in Jalandhar to Amritsar to meet Bhindranwale, where Bhindranwale was assured through Rode that Puri spoke for the government. During the course of the hour-long conversation, Bhindranwale agreed to abide with the terms of a settlement to be discussed between Puri and Longowal, also housed in the temple complex, and asked Bhindranwale to confine himself to Sikh spiritual and religious matters, which Bhindranwale also agreed to. Puri also asked him directly if he wanted Khalistan, and relayed that "[Bhindranwale] had never demanded Khalistan but if it was offered to him on a plate he would not reject it." Puri and Longowal would then agree to a settlement were "unexceptionable and acceptable to the government", and Puri would inform Chopra of the success and to inform Gandhi, who, however, never got back to Puri even after multiple contact attempts, leaving Puri with a "lasting impression" of Gandhi which was "very poor". He had also gotten word that a former MP from Amritsar, R.L. Bhatia, had also obtained assurances from Bhindranwale.

Puri would write that "all the arguments about why Operation Bluestar became necessary need to be nailed":

"The assumption that Bhindranwale was insisting on Khalistan and rigidly denied any compromise is the biggest lie. What needs investigation is why Indira Gandhi despite having obtained an agreement with Bhindranwale that rendered Operation Bluestar redundant nevertheless launched the military action that led to her own death and to the tragic aftermath. What was her compulsion? Who was advising her?"

In addition to Capt. Harcharan Singh Rode, another of Bhindranwale's elder brothers, Harjit Singh Rode, has also said that Bhindranwale had never demanded Khalistan, saying that he had wished for "no more and no less" than the full implementation of the Anandpur Sahib Resolution, a demand that the central government had "overlooked" as it mischaracterized his position.

- Indian politician Subramanian Swamy met Bhindranwale multiple times, stayed with him for several days, and closely observed the developments in Punjab during the 1990s. Swamy himself referred to Bhindranwale as a "Sant" and "short tempered person". He has remained adamant that Bhindranwale had never demanded Khalistan, and that the USSR was the main force behind the disinformation campaign that would lead to Operation Blue Star, aided by state politicians like Harkishan Singh Surjeet of the CPI, who according to Swamy had conveyed a message to the USSR warning that increased Sikh religiosity in Punjab would cause the decline of Communist politics in the state. Swamy contends that the USSR sought to make India more dependent on them against Pakistan as it expanded southward from its position in Afghanistan at the time. Later disclosures from declassified Soviet documents would confirm the role that the Soviets had played in feeding Indira Gandhi and Rajiv Gandhi, her perceived successor, misinformation about a secessionist movement supposedly being fomented by foreign entities:

One of the main aims of KGB active measures in the early 1980s was to manufacture evidence that the CIA and Pakistani intelligence were behind the growth of Sikh separatism in the Punjab. In the autumn of 1981 Service A launched operation KONTAKT, based on a forged document purporting to contain details of the weapons and money provided by [the ISI] to the militants seeking to bring about the creation of an independent Sikh state of Khalistan. In November the forgery was passed to a senior Indian diplomat in Islamabad. Shortly afterwards the Islamabad residency reported to the Centre that, according to (possibly optimistic) agents' reports, the level of anxiety in the Indian embassy about Pakistani support for Sikh separatists indicated that KONTAKT was having the alarmist effect that Service A had hoped for.

The forged document was presented to Gandhi on 13 May 1982. Later that year Yuri Andropov, shortly after becoming the leader of the USSR, approved a proposal by KGB head Vladimir Kryuchkov to fabricate further Pakistani intelligence documents detailing ISI plans to foment religious disturbances in Punjab and promote the creation of Khalistan as an independent Sikh state, to be passed to the Indian ambassador in Pakistan. The KGB appeared by now "supremely confident that it could continue to deceive her indefinitely with fabricated reports of CIA and Pakistani conspiracies against her," and would go on to successfully persuade Rajiv Gandhi, presumed to be Indira Gandhi's successor by 1983, of CIA subversion in Punjab, as the Dharam Yudh Morcha continued, and the USSR, like the CPI, "quickly expressed full understanding of the steps taken by the Indian government to curb terrorism" when she ordered Operation Blue Star, and "once again, Mrs. Gandhi took seriously Soviet claims of secret CIA support for the Sikhs."

Swamy had also published an article on 13 May 1984 stating that any attack on the Akal Takht would be "folly," writing, "If the firing is heavy, and the temple or the Akal Takht – which houses Guru Gobind Singh's swords – are damaged, India, as a concept will be destroyed. The wound inflicted on the Sikh heart and mind will be permanent and there will be no end to the bloodshed, thereafter," also questioning why the various paramilitary and intelligence organizations surrounding the temple complex were not arresting any supposed figures of interest reportedly coming in and out freely. In another article soon after the attack, he stated that the government had been conducting a disinformation campaign to legitimize it, the goal of which was to "make out that the Golden Temple was the haven of criminals, a store of armory and a citadel of the nation's dismemberment conspiracy."

On the KGB role in facilitating the operation, Swamy would state in 1992, "The 1984 Operation Blue Star became necessary because of the vast disinformation against Sant Bhindranwale by the KGB, and repeated inside Parliament by the Congress Party of India." Calling Bhindranwale a friend, and referring to his frequent press conferences and open meetings with dignitaries, he has controversially always refused to term him a terrorist, saying that "only declassification of files can uncover the truth."

== Views on Khalistan ==
Bhindranwale never supported Khalistan or separation from India, was not an outspoken supporter of Khalistan, and never demanded it, although he often emphasized the separate identity of the Sikhs. Bhindranwale stated his position on Khalistan, a movement which was first introduced in concept during the 1946 independence negotiations. During interviews with domestic and foreign journalists and public speeches through his phrase that "Sikh ik vakhri qaum hai" (or, "Sikhism is a distinct nation"), using the word 'Qaum' (nation, people, or also religion) when referring to the Sikh population of Punjab, though others have argued that "national" is a mistranslation of 'qaum,' as India was a nation of various races and 'qaums.' In a speech given by Bhindranwale on 27 March 1983:

I stayed ten days in Delhi. There I too was asked, just as they ask me here all the time when friends from the newspaper come, [They ask] "Sant Ji, do you want Khalistan?’ I replied; “Brothers, I don't oppose it nor do I support it. We are silent. However, one thing is definite, if this time the Queen of India does give it to us, we shall certainly take it. We won't reject it. We shall not repeat the mistake of 1947. As yet, we do not ask for it. It is Indira Gandhi's business and not mine, nor Longowal's, nor of any other of our leaders. It is Indira's business, Indira should tell us whether she wants to keep us in Hindustan or not. We like to live together [with the rest of Indians]; we like to live in India.”

While Bhindranwale never explicitly supported Khalistan, in a BBC interview, he stated that if the government agreed to the creation of such a state, he would not refuse and repeat the mistakes made by Sikh leadership during the 1946 independence: “How can a nation which has sacrificed so much for the freedom of the country want it fragmented but I shall definitely say that we are not in favor of Khalistan nor are we against it.” adding that the Sikhs would opt for a separate state only if they were discriminated against and were not respected in India, or if their distinct Sikh identity was in any way threatened. In regards to the idea of the Indian government attacking the Darbar Sahib, he stated, "if the Indian Government invaded the Darbar Sahib complex, the foundation for an independent Sikh state will have been laid."

In his final interview to Subhash Kirpekar, Bhindranwale stated that "Sikhs can neither live in India nor with India. If treated as equals it may be possible. But frankly speaking I don't think that is possible." Kuldip Brar, who would later head Operation Blue Star, would subsequently put forth that per the Indian intelligence sources in early June 1984, there was a "strong feeling" and "some sort of information" among the government that Bhindranwale was supposedly planning to declare Khalistan an independent country any moment with support from Pakistan, that Khalistani currency had allegedly already been distributed, and that this declaration would have increased chances of Punjab Police and security personnel siding with Bhindranwale.

In later disclosures from former R&AW special secretary G.B.S. Sidhu, R&AW itself helped "build the Khalistan legend," actively participated in the planning of Operation Blue Star. While posted in Ottawa, Canada in 1976 to look into the "Khalistan problem" among the Sikh diaspora, Sidhu found "nothing amiss" during the three years he was there, stating that "Delhi was unnecessarily making a mountain of a molehill where none existed," that the agency created seven posts in West Europe and North America in 1981 to counter non-existent Khalistan activities, and that the deployed officers were "not always familiar with the Sikhs or the Punjab issue." Describing the secessionist movement as a "chimera" until the attack on the Darbar Sahib, after which the insurgency would start, he would later contend that:

Bhindranwale never raised the demand for Khalistan or went beyond the Akali Anandpur Sahib Resolution, while he himself was prepared for negotiations to the very end. All talks with the more moderate Akalis had already failed. The hawks had taken control of Mrs Gandhi and so the worst was to happen and the Sikhs never forgave her for what happened.

According to a New York Times article written just a few weeks after the operation:

Before the raid on the Golden Temple, neither the Government nor anyone else appeared to put much credence in the Khalistan movement. Mr. Bhindranwale himself said many times that he was not seeking an independent country for Sikhs, merely greater autonomy for Punjab within the Indian Union....One possible explanation advanced for the Government's raising of the Khalistan question is that it needs to take every opportunity to justify the killing in Amritsar and the invasion of the Sikhs' holiest shrine.

Khushwant Singh had written that "considerable Khalistan sentiment seems to have arisen since the raid on the temple, which many Sikhs, if not most, have taken as a deep offense to their religion and their sensibilities," referring to the drastic change in community sentiments after the army attack. According to former member of the Punjab Legislative Assembly Inderjit Singh Jaijee,

"So much anxiety was created about Bhindranwale and his men. They were called antinational even though Bhindranwale had always maintained he was not asking for Khalistan, but if the government wanted to push that as the only solution, he would take it. … The government meticulously set the stage. It was not him."

== Death ==
In June 1984, after the negotiations, Prime Minister of India Indira Gandhi ordered Operation Blue Star, an Indian Army operation carried out between 1 and 8 June 1984, to remove Bhindranwale and his armed militants from the buildings of the Harmandir Sahib complex in Amritsar, Punjab. Bhindranwale was killed in the operation. Army officers and soldiers commented on 'the courage and commitment' of the followers of Bhindranwale who died in action; General J. S. Aurora, who had been the commanding officer of two of the operation's commanding officers, would admit that the militants had "taken every advantage of their defensive positions, and fought valiantly and skillfully." Bhindranwale had been wounded in his abdomen and the right-side of his face.

Army action in the Punjab, which had been discussed as early as December 1983 to consolidate Hindu votes for Congress, began on 3 June, the day of Longowal's planned morcha. Punjab's borders were sealed off and intrastate movement was disabled by the troop presence, with the water and electricity supply to the Golden Temple cut off. Exploratory fire was attempted on 4 June, with army commandos and CS gas proving ineffective on 5 June. The use of tanks on the complex began on 6 June, with tanks, helicopters, and other means used to deter the thousands of upset villagers attempting to gather in Amritsar, along with any other attempted gathering at over 125 other gurdwaras which had been taken over preemptively by the state. The main action was concluded by 6 June, in which a large number of pilgrims, including women and children, had been killed, and young men shot, by incensed troops who had entered the complex, with their hands tied back with their own turbans, with others dying of suffocation in the guest rooms set up as detainment camps. The operation resulted in 700 army casualties and 5,000 civilian deaths.

According to Lieutenant General Kuldip Singh Brar, who commanded the operation, the body of Bhindranwale was identified by a number of agencies, including the police, the Intelligence Bureau and militants in the Army's custody. Bhindranwale's brother also identified Bhindranwale's body. Pictures of what appear to be Bhindranwale's body have been published in at least two widely circulated books, Tragedy of Punjab: Operation Bluestar and After and Amritsar: Mrs Gandhi's Last Battle. BBC correspondent Mark Tully also reported seeing Bhindranwale's body during his funeral. According to Radhika Chopa, a photograph of Bhindranwale's body posed in shavasana is present in the collection of the Sikh Reference Library, with the face of the figure being obscured. The body of Bhindranwale was treated with respect by General Brar, being covered with a sheet and cremated.

In 2016, The Week quoted former members of the confidential Special Group (SG) of India's Research and Analysis Wing as stating that SG had killed Bhindranwale using AK-47 rifles during Operation Blue Star, despite the Para SF claiming responsibility for it.

== Legacy ==
Cynthia Keppley Mahmood wrote in Fighting for Faith and Nation: Dialogues With Sikh Militants that Bhindranwale never learned English but mastered Punjabi. He was adept at television, radio and press interviews. Keppley further stated that "those who knew him personally uniformly report his general likability and ready humour as well his dedication to Sikhism". The author further states that "Largely responsible for launching Sikh militancy, he is valorized by militants and demonised by enemies and the accounts from the two divergent sources seem to refer to two completely different persons."

Though journalist Khushwant Singh was opposed to Bhindranwale, he allowed that the Sikh preacher-become-activist genuinely made no distinction between higher and lower castes, and that he had restored thousands of drunken or doped Sikh men, inured to pornographic films, to their families, and that Operation Blue Star had given the movement for Khalistan its first martyr in Jarnail Singh Bhindranwale. In 2003, at a function arranged by the Shiromani Gurdwara Prabandhak Committee, at Akal Takht Amritsar under the vision of president SGPC Prof. Kirpal Singh Badungar and Singh Sahib Giani Joginder Singh Vedanti, former jathedar of the Akal Takht made a formal declaration that Bhindranwale was a "martyr" and awarded his son, Ishar Singh, a robe of honour. Harbans Singh's The Encyclopedia of Sikhism describes Bhindranwale as "a phenomenal figure of modern Sikhism".

=== In popular culture ===
A movie named Dharam Yudh Morcha, released in 2016, was based on Jarnail Singh Bhindranwale, mostly depicting the Sikhs' struggle for preserving Punjabi language and the Anandpur Sahib resolution. Though the movie was banned to avoid controversy, it is available on online platforms.

== See also ==
- Amrik Singh
- Shabeg Singh
- 1984 Sikh Massacre
