= Mohanpura, Punjab =

Mohanpura
- city
- Location in Punjab, India
- Coordinates: 31.29982°N 74.99508°E
- Country: India
- State: Punjab
- District: Tarn Taran
- Elevation: 209 m (686 ft)

Population (2001)
  - Total: 5,000

Languages
  - Official: Punjabi
- Time zone: UTC+5:30 (IST)
- Postal code: 143409
- Telephone code: 01852[area code]
- Vehicle registration: PB 46
- Website: http://www.Mohanpur.webs.com

Mohanpura is a city in the Tarn Taran district of the Indian state of Punjab, located 40 km from Amritsar.

== History ==
Mohanpura's history dates back to the 17th century.

Mohanpura has a significant number of families with the "Sandhu" surname.

== Location ==
Mohanpura is 4 km from NH-54 (old NH-15) and lies between Sarhali and Naushehra Pannuan. Neighbouring villages include Sohawa, Brahampur, Wring and Bhathal.

== Transport ==
The nearest train station to Mohanpura is the Tarn Taran Railway Station. From there the city is connected to Amritsar and Ludhiana by various local trains (MEMU and DMU) and a number of regional express trains. For further connections to longer distance services including to the union capital, Delhi, one can travel to Amritsar and board other trains for longer-distance services.

Regular private bus services operate between Tarn Taran and the various surrounding villages and towns, as well as the Tempo three-wheeler service. These operate from both the Brahmpur Road Bus Stop and Mohanpura Road Bus Stop. Services connect with some Interstate and State Bus Transport at Tarn Taran. Other Interstate and State buses can be caught from Amritsar Bus Stand.

For personal service, a minivan taxi service can be hired from the Tarn Taran Bus Stand.

The nearest airport is Sri Guru Ram Dass Jee International Airport, located in Amritsar. The airport offers regional air travel as well as destinations in the Middle East, North America and Europe.

== Education ==
There is a Government-run Primary and High School in Mohanpura.

== Famous Spots ==
Mohanpura is the home of the famous Gurudwara, Baba Jawahar Das Ji. Other Gurudwaras in this area are Gurudwara Sri Rorhi Sahib, and Gurudwara made by Panchayat.

== Facilities ==
Mohanpura has its own dispensary. It also has its own stadium where the Kabaddi Tournament is held every year. There is one petrol pump on the named of Tenth Guru “Guru Gobind Singh Kisan Sewa kendra” is running successfully under the ownership of Sardar Jaswinder Singh Mohanpura (ex Sarpanch) of this Village.

Khalsa Sports & Welfare Club is a social organization working towards a better educated society. Their aim is to improve literacy and reduce drug use. The NGO focuses on assessing individual strengths and needs, setting personal goals and encouraging youth to get involved in sports and games by providing a conducive environment that encourages growth and development.
