= Tarn Taran district =

- District of Punjab
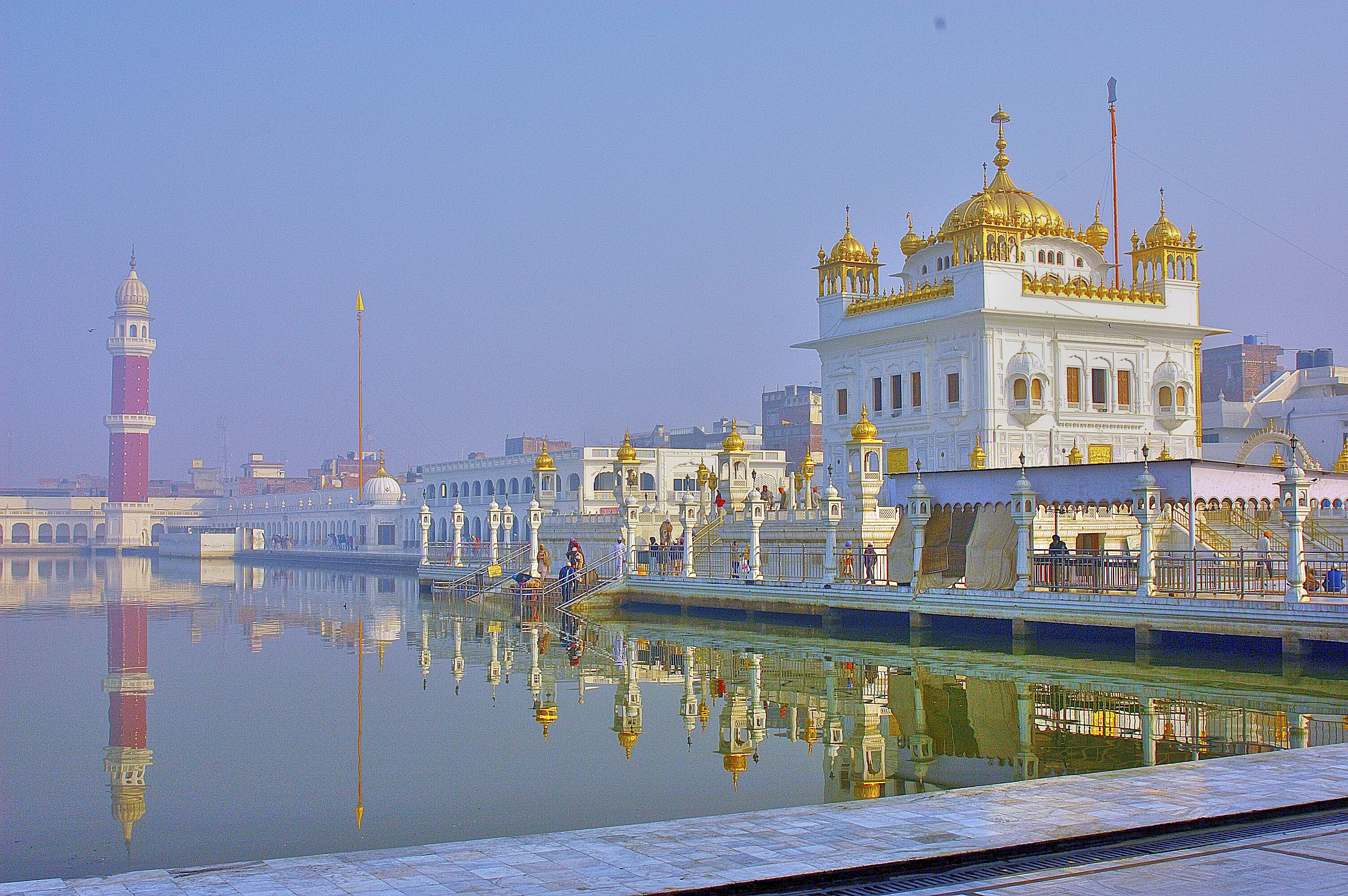
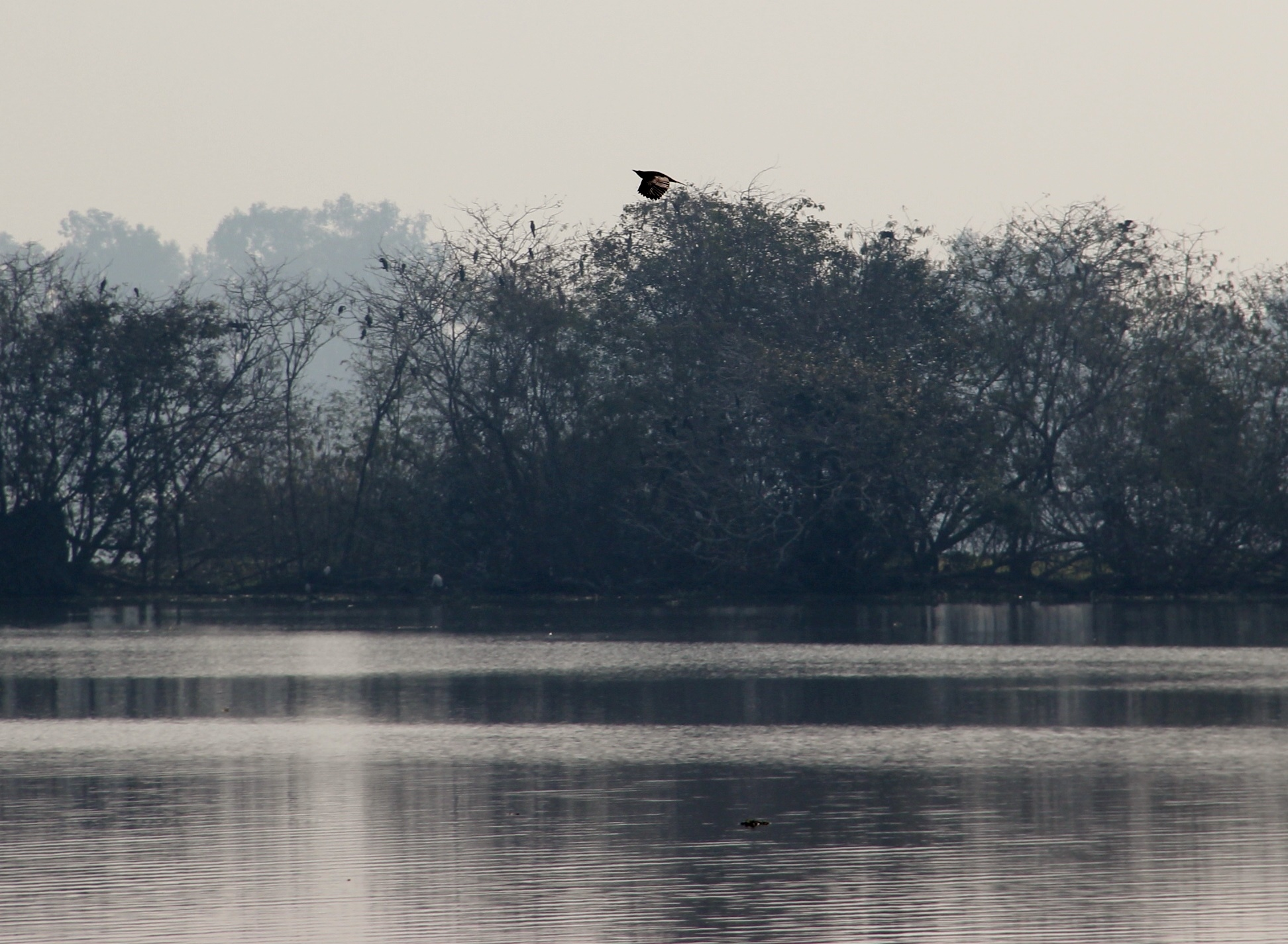
- Top: Gurdwara Sri Tarn Taran Sahib; Bottom: Birds at Harike Wetland

- Location in Punjab
- Coordinates: 31°27′36″N 74°55′48″E
- Country: India
- State: Punjab
- Region: Majha
- Named for: Pool of salvation
- Headquarters: Tarn Taran Sahib

Government
  - Administrator of District: Harmesh Singh Pabla

Area
  - Total: 2,414 km^{2} (932 sq mi)

Population (2011)
  - Total: 1,119,627
  - Density: 463.8/km^{2} (1,201/sq mi)

Languages
  - Official: Punjabi
- Time zone: UTC+5:30 (IST)
- Literacy: 69.4%
- Website: tarntaran.gov.in

Tarn Taran district is one of the districts in the Majha region of Punjab, India. The main cities are Tarn Taran Sahib, Bhikhiwind, Khadur Sahib and Patti. The City of Tarn Taran Sahib is a holy place for Sikhs. Tarn Taran's Sikh population makes it the most heavily concentrated administrative district of Sikhs in India and the world. The district is part of the Jalandhar division.

Tarn Taran district was formed in 2006 out of Amritsar District. The declaration to this effect was made by Captain Amarinder Singh, Chief Minister of Punjab, during the celebrations marking the martyrdom day of Sri Guru Arjan Dev Ji. With this, it became the 19th district of Punjab. It has four tehsils, which are Bhikhiwind, Patti, Khadur Sahib and Tarn Taran Sahib. The District Headquarters is headed by the Deputy Commissioner, along with a Senior Superintendent of Police, Civil Surgeon, district Education Officer, Improvement Trust and a Municipal Council. The district judiciary is headed by the District and Session Judge, aided by several Additional District and Sessions Judges, the Chief Judicial Magistrate, and other officials.

== Location ==
Tarn Taran is located in the state of Punjab, in far northern India. It is surrounded by district of Amritsar in the north, district Kapurthala in the east, district Ferozepur in the south and Pakistan in the west.

=== Coordinates ===
Taran taran district lies between 31 0 05’, and 31 0 30’ 05 north latitude 74 0 30’ and 75 0 15’ 05“ east longitudes. The area falls in Survey Of India topo sheet Nos 44-I & 44-M.

== Administration ==
=== Subdistricts of Tarn Taran district ===
Map of Tarn Taran district, 2011

According to the Indian government's integrated online directory, Tarn Taran district is divided into the following subdistricts (tehsils/subdivisions) and blocks:

- Subdistricts
  1. Bhikhiwind
  2. Khadur Sahib
  3. Patti
  4. Tarn Taran
- Blocks:
  1. Bhikhi Wind-13
  2. Chohla Sahib-8
  3. Gandiwind-9
  4. Khadur-Sahib-10
  5. Nagoke
  6. Naushehra Pannuan-11
  7. Patti-14
  8. Tarn Taran-12
  9. Valtoha-15

== History ==
The foundation of Tarn Taran city was laid by fifth Sikh guru, Guru Arjan Dev in 1596 on the historic Delhi-Lahore Royal Badshahi Road. The area of Tarn Taran Sahib later came under the control of the Bhangi Misl ruled by a powerful Sikh family of Dhillon clan from 1716 to 1810.

During the 1965 India–Pakistan war, the town of Khem Karan was captured by the Pakistan army during early September 1965. The Pakistani forces were later defeated during the battle of Asal Uttar, that was fought from 8 to 10 September. At that time, it was the largest tank battle since the Second World War. Khem Karan remained under Pakistani occupation for about six months till the signing of Tashkent agreement between India and Pakistan on 10 January 1966.

During the war, the people of the area had to leave their houses and go far away. Many houses, crops and railway tracks were destroyed. In the areas occupied by Pakistan, many houses were looted by Pakistani troops. Even the doors and windows were removed.

During the Insurgency in Punjab, India, Tarn Taran was the key stronghold of well-funded and armed Sikh separatist groups. Several key separatist leaders trace their origins to Tarn Taran, including but not limited to Sukhdev Singh Babbar, co-founder of Babbar Khalsa, Avtar Singh Brahma, co-founder of the Khalistan Liberation Force, Labh Singh of the Khalistan Commando Force, and Gurbachan Singh Manochahal founder of the Bhindranwale Tiger Force of Khalistan.

In the fall of 1984, the Tarn Taran district was impacted by Operation Woodrose which resulted in the establishment of arms trafficking between Pakistan's Inter-Services Intelligence and Sikh militants in Tarn Taran, initiated by former Pakistani President Muhammad Zia Ul-Haq. By the end of the 1980s and following Zia's death, Pakistan began to reallocate support for militancy from Punjab toward Jammu and Kashmir. Today, the Tarn Taran district remains one of the most adversely impacted districts for narcotics and arms trafficking from Pakistan.

In the post-independence era, Partap Singh Kairon is among Tarn Taran's most well known residents. Kairon was a freedom fighter during British rule and served as the 3rd Chief Minister of Punjab from 1956-1964. He was assassinated in Sonipat district, now within Haryana, on February 8, 1965.

== Demographics ==
Historical population
Year	Pop.	±% p.a.
1901	422,024	—
1911	363,045	−1.49%
1921	383,090	+0.54%
1931	460,470	+1.86%
1941	576,325	+2.27%
1951	485,947	−1.69%
1961	524,117	+0.76%
1971	626,166	+1.79%
1981	728,142	+1.52%
1991	806,944	+1.03%
2001	939,057	+1.53%
2011	1,119,627	+1.77%

According to the 2011 census Tarn Taran district has a population of 1,119,627, roughly equal to the nation of Cyprus or the US state of Rhode Island. This gives it a ranking of 413th in India (out of a total of 640). The district has a population density of 464 inhabitants per square kilometre (1,200/sq mi). Its population growth rate over the decade 2001-2011 was 19.28%. Tarn Taran has a sex ratio of 898 females for every 1000 males, and a literacy rate of 69.4%. Scheduled Castes made up 33.71% of the population.

Languages of Tarn Taran District (2011)
1. Punjabi (99.0%)
2. Others (1.05%)

=== Religion ===
Religion in Tarn Taran district (2011)
Religion	Percent
Sikhism	93.33%
Hinduism	5.40%
Christianity	0.54%
Other	0.73%

Religion by tehsil	Sikh		Hindu		Christian		Muslim	
Religion by tehsil	Pop	%	Pop	%	Pop	%	Pop	%
Khadur Sahib	180,065	95.88%	5,774	3.07%	373	0.20%	735	0.39%
Tarn Taran	462,591	93.71%	25,064	5.08%	2,499	0.51%	1,849	0.37%
Patti	402,247	91.80%	29,666	6.77%	3,223	0.74%	1,271	0.29%

The table below shows the population of different religions in absolute numbers in the urban and rural areas of Tarn Taran district.

Absolute numbers of different religious groups in Tarn Taran district
Religion	Urban (2022)	Rural (2022)	Urban (2001)	Rural (2001)
Sikh	1,63,976	10,15,876	1,04,728	9,40,175
Hindu	44,876	12,786	34,146	26,358
Christian	1,710	2,535	1,675	4,420
Muslim	560	4,658	495	5,051
Other religions	920	2,980	751	3,519

Tarn Taran district has the highest % share of Sikhs among all the districts of Punjab followed by Moga district (as of 2011 census).

== Health ==
As of 2018, the number of registered doctors in Taran Taran district were 84 and registered nurses were 3,378. That means that the average population served per doctor in the district was 15,210 in that year, which was the highest in the state.

The table below shows the data from the district nutrition profile of children below the age of 5 years, in Taran Taran, as of year 2020.

District nutrition profile of children under 5 years of age in Taran Taran, year 2020
Indicators	Number of children (<5 years)	Percent (2020)	Percent (2016)
Stunted	22,372	24%	23%
Wasted	10,626	11%	10%
Severely wasted	3,426	4%	4%
Underweight	13,525	14%	14%
Overweight/obesity	4,254	5%	3%
Anemia	59,640	71%	53%
Total children	94,120		

The table below shows the district nutrition profile of Taran Taran of women between the ages of 15 and 49 years, as of year 2020.

District nutritional profile of Taran Taran of women of 15–49 years, in 2020
Indicators	Number of women (15–49 years)	Percent (2020)	Percent (2016)
Underweight (BMI <18.5 kg/m^2)	43,756	13%	14%
Overweight/obesity	136,624	39%	30%
Hypertension	109,005	31%	18%
Diabetes	42,706	12%	NA
Anemia (non-preg)	216,506	62%	47%
Anemia (preg)	NA	NA	34%
Total women (preg)	18,109		
Total women	350,049		

The table below shows the current use of family planning methods by currently married women between the age of 15 and 49 years, in Taran Taran district.

Family planning methods used by women between the ages of 15 and 49 years, in Taran Taran district
Method	Total (2015–16)	Rural (2015–16)
Female sterilization	49.6%	50.2%
Male sterilization	0.8%	0.9%
IUD/PPIUD	7.1%	8.1%
Pill	1.9%	1.7%
Condom	17.3%	15.9%
Any modern method	76.8%	76.9%
Any method	80.8%	80.3%
Total unmet need	3.5%	3.8%
Unmet need for spacing	1.6%	1.8%

The table below shows the number of road accidents and people affected in Taran Taran district by year.

Road accidents and people affected in Taran Taran district by year
Year	Accidents	Killed	Injured	Vehicles Involved
2022	126	110	96	183
2021	123	126	37	85
2020	97	93	35	122
2019	134	121	87	119

== Economy ==
The income of Municipalities and Municipal corporations in Taran Taran district from municipal rates and taxes in the year 2018 was 54,566 thousand rupees.

As of 2014–15, there were 452 registered Micro and Small Enterprise (MSE) units in the Taran Taran district, which provided employment to 2,717 people. There were 6 Medium and Large industrial units, which provided employment to 609 people.

== Politics ==
No.	Constituency	Name of MLA	Party	Bench
21	Sri Tarn Taran Sahib	Harmeet Singh Sandhu	Aam Aadmi Party	Government
22	Khemkaran	Sarvan Singh Dhun	Aam Aadmi Party	Government
23	Patti	Laljit Singh Bhullar	Aam Aadmi Party	Government
24	Sri Khadoor Sahib	Manjinder Singh Lalpura	Aam Aadmi Party	Government

== Transport ==
=== Air ===
There is no commercial airport in the district. The nearest airport is Amritsar International Airport. Direct International flights are available to key cities around the world in the likes of London, Birmingham, Dubai, Singapore, Kuala Lumpur, Doha, Tashkent and Ashgabat. Domestic connections are available to almost every major city of India.

=== Rail ===
The rail network provides good connectivity across the district. Amritsar-Khemkaran and Beas-Tarn Taran railway lines pass through Tarn Taran district. Tarn Taran Junction railway station provides cross connectivity between these two lines. A new project of rail line from Patti to Makhu has been approved by railways since 2013 but not started till date due to delay by state government on land acquisition.

=== Road ===
The district is well connected through national highways to rest of Punjab state and nationally. Following national highways pass through the district.

- National Highway 54
- National Highway 354
- National Highway 703B
- National Highway 703A (Shri Guru Nanak Dev Ji Marg).

== Towns and villages ==
The villages and towns of Tarn Taran District include:

- Banwalipur
- Bhikhiwind
- Chhichhrewal
- Dilawalpur
- Fatehabad
- Goindwal
- Khadur Sahib
- Kallah
- Khalra
- Khem Karan
- Maniyala Jai Singh Wala
- Mohanpura
- Mughalwala
- Munda Pind
- Naushehra Pannuan
- Patti
- Sur Singh

== Notable people ==
- Gurbaksh Chahal, an Indian-American internet entrepreneur and founder of several internet advertising companies
- Kirpal Singh Chugh, an Indian nephrologist and considered by many to have been the father of nephrology in India
- Satyavati Devi (born 1905) - Noted Freedom fighter
- Deepak Dhawan - State Committee member of CPI(M), President of Guru Nanak Dev University (AISF), and Prominent writer.
- Prem Dhillon, Punjabi singer and artist
- Krishan Kant - Former Vice President of India
- Jaswant Singh Khalra, Prominent Human Rights activist
- Nizam Lohar, 19th century heroic rebel of the Punjab
- Surender Mohan Pathak, a Hindi-language crime fiction writer
- Lala Achint Ram- Noted freedom fighter, Member of the constituent assembly, Later parliamentarian
- Mian Muhammad Sharif - Pakistani businessman, father of Nawaz and Shehbaz Sharif, former prime ministers of Pakistan
- Ritu Singh, a Dalit activist
- Praveen Kumar Sobti, an athlete, actor and politician
- Mohan Singh Tur, former Jathedar of Akal Takht, Amritsar and Member of Lok Sabha

== See also ==
- Tarn Taran (Lok Sabha constituency)
