= Dadehar =

Dadehar Sahib
- village
- Location in Punjab, India Dadehar Sahib (India) Dadehar Sahib (Asia)
- Coordinates: 31°15′15″N 74°55′28″E
- Country: India
- State: Punjab
- District: Tarn Taran

Languages
  - Official: Punjabi
- Time zone: UTC+5:30 (IST)
- Postal code: 143410
- Vehicle registration: PB-46
- Coastline: 0 kilometres (0 mi)
- Nearest city: Patti, Punjab

Dadehar Sahib is a village in Tarn Taran district in the Indian state of Punjab. It is located 30 km away from the Sikh holy city Amritsar and 18 km from Tarn Taran city.

== History ==
This village is more than 876 years old. It was created by a man named Dadehar who originated from Malwa (Punjab) in search of new land, along with his nephew Sarhali. Both families traveled towards Majha from Malwa (Punjab) across the Setlej River. While it was about sunset Dadehar took rest and chose his place he desired to live on a small hill along with his family (in Punjabi pronoun Thea). They agreed that the nephew and his family would walk further north till it was dark, and eventually that would be the nephew's home, but to divide the land they also agreed that next morning from the first ray of sun both uncle and nephew would walk towards each other and where they would meet, to draw a line to divide the land. There is a myth that the nephew Sarhali walked slightly early so that is the reason the divide of the land isn't exactly in the middle; it is more occupied towards Dadehar than Sarhali.

== History of people ==
The older generation of Dadehar has received rites of amrit at the hands of Guru Gobind Singh, and joined the Khasala Army. Dadehar had bred many warriors who fought against the Moguls and defended India against invaders. Baba Sobha Singh Sandhu and many other Sikh Sandhu Jatts of Dadehar joined Ahluwalia Sikh Misl. People of Dadehar have fought alone with Hari Singh Nalwa against the Mughal Raj and contributed to establish the Sikh Kingdom.

A prominent freedom fighter, Saint Baba Vasakha Singh Dadehar, (see Sikhism in the United States) is well known as a native of Dadaher. Baba Vasakha Singh died on 5 December 1957. In memory of Baba ji every year on 4 December nagar kirtan starts from his birth place and ends at the Gurudwara Taap Sathan Baba Vasakha Singh Ji. Out of due respect Dadehar was awarded the Sahib title and at present this village is known as Dadehar Sahib.

Dadehar people are from the Sandhu Jat clan and have established more than 22 villages in Amritsar District and nephew Sarhali have established 17 villages.

== Education ==
Dadehar Sahib has a Government, a primary and Secondary School. Recently Akal Academy opened its branch in Dadehar Sahib
