= Mughalwala =

- village
- location in Punjab, India Mughalwala (India)
- Coordinates: 31.303321°N 74.801405°E
- country: India
- state: Punjab
- District: Tarn Taran
- block: Patti

Government
  - Type: Panchayati raj (India)
  - Body: Gram panchayat
- Time zone: UTC+5: 30 (Indian Standard Time)
- nearby city: Tarn Taran

Mughalwala or Mughal Wala is a village in Patti-14 Tehsil in Tarn Taran district of Punjab state, India. It is located 23 kilometres (14 mi) south of its district headquarters at Tarn Taran Sahib and 225 kilometres (140 mi) from the state capital at Chandigarh.
