= Fatehabad, Punjab =

Town in Punjab State, India

Fatehabad
- Town
- Punjab, India Fatehabad (India)
- Coordinates: 31°22′48″N 75°05′51″E
- Country: India
- State: Punjab
- District: Tarn Taran
  - Rank: 0Hr

Population (2011)
  - Total: 8,860

Languages
  - Official: Punjabi
- Time zone: UTC+5:30 (IST)
- PIN: 143407

Fatehabad is a small town in the Tarn Taran district of Punjab State. in India, located about 20 km from Tarn Taran Sahib

== Historical importance ==
Fatehabad was once the capital of the Ahluwalia Misl prior to the shifting of the capital to Kapurthala. This town is older than Tarn Taran and Amritsar. It was originally a border fort that had a Ghaznavid garrison permanently stationed there, and is known to have existed from the time of Mahmud Ghaznavi, or even earlier. The name Fatehabad is believed to signify the victory of the Ahluwalia Misl against the Muslim governor of Fatehabad. It is believed Muhammad Ghori stationed his troops here and the town was turned into a kasbah which is a military encampment. Jassa Singh, born in 1718 to Bhadr Singh a great grandson of Sadhu Singh Ahluwalia, the founder of the Ahluwalia Misl, was the nephew of Bhag Singh. He was the founder of Kapurthala State in 1772. In the year 1755, he had defeated Adina Beg, the Mughal Governor of Jullundur, and taken possession of Fatehabad.

The older town, which was of strategic importance, was frequently visited by the Mughals and the later rulers, the Mughals had constructed an Imperial Serai for the benefit of armies and caravans, beside several other buildings, which are now in ruins following the destruction of the older town by the forces of the Mughal Ruler Jahangir.

Fatehabad is also known as the place where the First Sikh Guru, Guru Nanak had penned the Gurbani in praise of Nature

Fatehabad is the place to which the family of the renowned Urdu poet, Mehr Lal Soni Zia Fatehabadi belonged. This town is situated near Goindwal Sahib and Khadur Sahib, places connected with Guru Angad Dev and Guru Amar Das.

== Geography ==
Fatehabad is situated at a distance of 4 km from Khadur Sahib, tehsil headquarter of same name. Nearby villages are Hothian, Khwaspur, Khan Chhapri and Bharowal.

== Demographics ==
As per 2011 Census of India, Fatehabad had 1649 households with a total population of 8,860 of which 4,674 (53%) were males and 4186 (47%) were females. Population below 6 years was 1,084. The literacy rate of Fatehabad was 71.04% compared to 75.84% of Punjab. In Fatehabad male literacy was 74.37% while female literacy rate was 67.31%. The sex ratio was 896 females per thousand males.

== Transportation ==
The nearest railway stations to Fatehabad are Goindwal Sahib Railway station at a distance of 1.5 km.

== See also ==
- Zia Fatehabadi
