= Munda Pind =

- village
- Location in Punjab Munda Pind (India)
- Coordinates: 31.2907913°N 75.0597095°E
- Country: India
- State: Punjab
- District: Tarn Taran District
- Tehsil: Khadur Sahib

Population (2001)
  - Total: 4 526
- Time zone: UTC+5:30 (Indian Standard Time)
- PIN: 143407
- Vehicle registration: PB 046

Munda Pind village situated on edge of Sutlej River in Tarn Taran Sahib District of Punjab, India. According to 2001 census of India the Village has the population of 4,526 and 782 houses.

== Education ==
- Government primary school
- Government high school
- Baba amar singh model school
- Baba Deep Singh public school (Dehra sahib)
- Sri guru hargobind sahib sen sec school jamarai
- Lotus valley sen. Sec. school tur
- Shah harbans school rani walah
- Baba bir singh public school bhail
