= Hothian =

- Village
- Location in Punjab, India Hothian (India)
- Coordinates: 31.397553°N 75.126809°E
- Country: India
- State: Punjab
- District: tarn taran

Government
  - Type: Panchayati raj (India)
  - Body: Gram panchayat

Population (2011)
  - Total: 1,100
- Sex ratio 286/274♂/♀

Languages
  - Official: Punjabi
  - Other spoken: Hindi
- Time zone: UTC+5:30 (IST)
- PIN: 143118
- Telephone code: 01859
- ISO 3166 code: IN-PB
- Vehicle registration: PB-63
- Website: tarntaran.gov.in

Hothian is a village in Tarn taran district of Punjab State, India. It is located 5 kilometres (3.1 mi) from Khadoor sahib, which is both district and sub-district headquarters of Hothian. The village is administrated by a Sarpanch, who is an elected representative.

== Demography ==
According to the report published by Census India in 2011, Hothian has total number of 108 houses and population of 560 of which include 286 males and 274 females. Literacy rate of Hothian is 72.78%, lower than state average of 75.84%. The population of children under the age of 6 years is 75 which is 13.39% of total population of Hothian, and child sex ratio is approximately 630, lower than state average of 846.

== Population data ==
Particulars	Total	Male	Female
Total No. of Houses	108	-	-
Population	560	286	274
Child (0-6)	75	46	29
Schedule Caste	423	211	212
Schedule Tribe	0	0	0
Literacy	72.78 %	75.42 %	70.20 %
Total Workers	167	155	12
Main Worker	166	0	0
Marginal Worker	1	0	1

== Air travel connectivity ==
The closest airport to the village is Sri Guru Ram Dass Jee International Airport.
