= Kirpal Singh Chugh =

Indian nephrologist

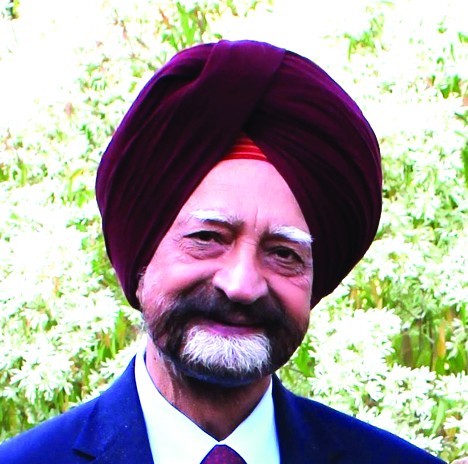
- Born: 12 December 1932; Patti, Amritsar, Punjab, India
- Died: 17 September 2017 (aged 84)
- Occupation: Nephrologist
- Children: Sumant Chugh, Sumeet Chugh
- Awards: Padma Shri; B. C. Roy Award; National Kidney Foundation Award; Nihon University Medical School Gold Medal; ICMR Outstanding Research Award; Motashaw Memorial Award; M. D. Adatia Award; Indian Society of Nephrologists Award; Association of Physicians of India Award; K. B. Kanwar Memorial Award; Dhanwantari National Award; Nephrology Forum Award

Kirpal Singh Chugh (12 December 1932 – 17 September 2017) was an Indian nephrologist from Patti, a neighbouring town to Amritsar in the Indian state of Punjab. He was reportedly the first qualified Indian nephrologist and is considered by many to have been the father of Nephrology in India for his pioneering efforts in starting the first medical department in the discipline in 1956 and establishing the first medical course in nephrology (DM) at the Post Graduate Institute of Medical Education and Research, Chandigarh .

Born on 12 December 1932, Chugh won many awards and honours such as B. C. Roy Award (1993), National Kidney Foundation Award, Nihon University Medical School Gold Medal (1979), ICMR Outstanding Research Award (1978), Motashaw Memorial Award (1975), M. D. Adatia Award (1976), Indian Society of Nephrologists Award (1976), Association of Physicians of India Award (1978), K. B. Kanwar Memorial Award (1979), Dhanwantari National Award and Nephrology Forum Award.

A member of the Advisory Board of World Kidney Forum and an elected Fellow of the National Academy of Medical Sciences, he was honored by the Government of India, in 2000, with the fourth highest Indian civilian award of Padma Shri. ResearchGate, an online repository of scientific data has listed 262 publications of K. S. Chugh.

== See also ==
- Nephrology
