= Dilawalpur =

Village in Punjab, India

- Village
- Country: India
- State: Punjab
- District: Tarn Taran

Languages
  - Official: Punjabi
- Time zone: UTC+5:30 (IST)
- Vehicle registration: PB-
- Coastline: 0 kilometres (0 mi)

Dilawalpur is a village in Tarn Taran district, Punjab, India.
