= Goindwal Sahib Power Plant =

Power plant in Punjab, India

- Location of Goindwal Sahib Power Plant in Punjab
- Country: India
- Coordinates: 31°23′N 75°09′E
- Status: Operational
- Commission date: February 2016
- Operator: GVK Industries

Thermal power station
- Primary fuel: Coal

Power generation
- Units operational: 2
- Nameplate capacity: 540 MW

External links
- Website: https://www.gvk.com

Goindwal Sahib Power Plant is a coal-based thermal power plant located at Goindwal Sahib in Tarn Taran district in the Indian state of Punjab. The power plant is operated by the GVK Group.

The coal for the power plant will be sourced from Tokisud and Seregarha coal mines in state of Jharkhand.

== Capacity ==
The planned capacity of the power plant is 540 MW (2x270 MW).

Stage	Unit Number	Capacity (MW)	Date of Commissioning
1st	1	270	1 April 2016
1st	2	270	14 April 2016
