= Naushehra Pannuan =

Naushehra Pannuan PB46 car bazaar
- village
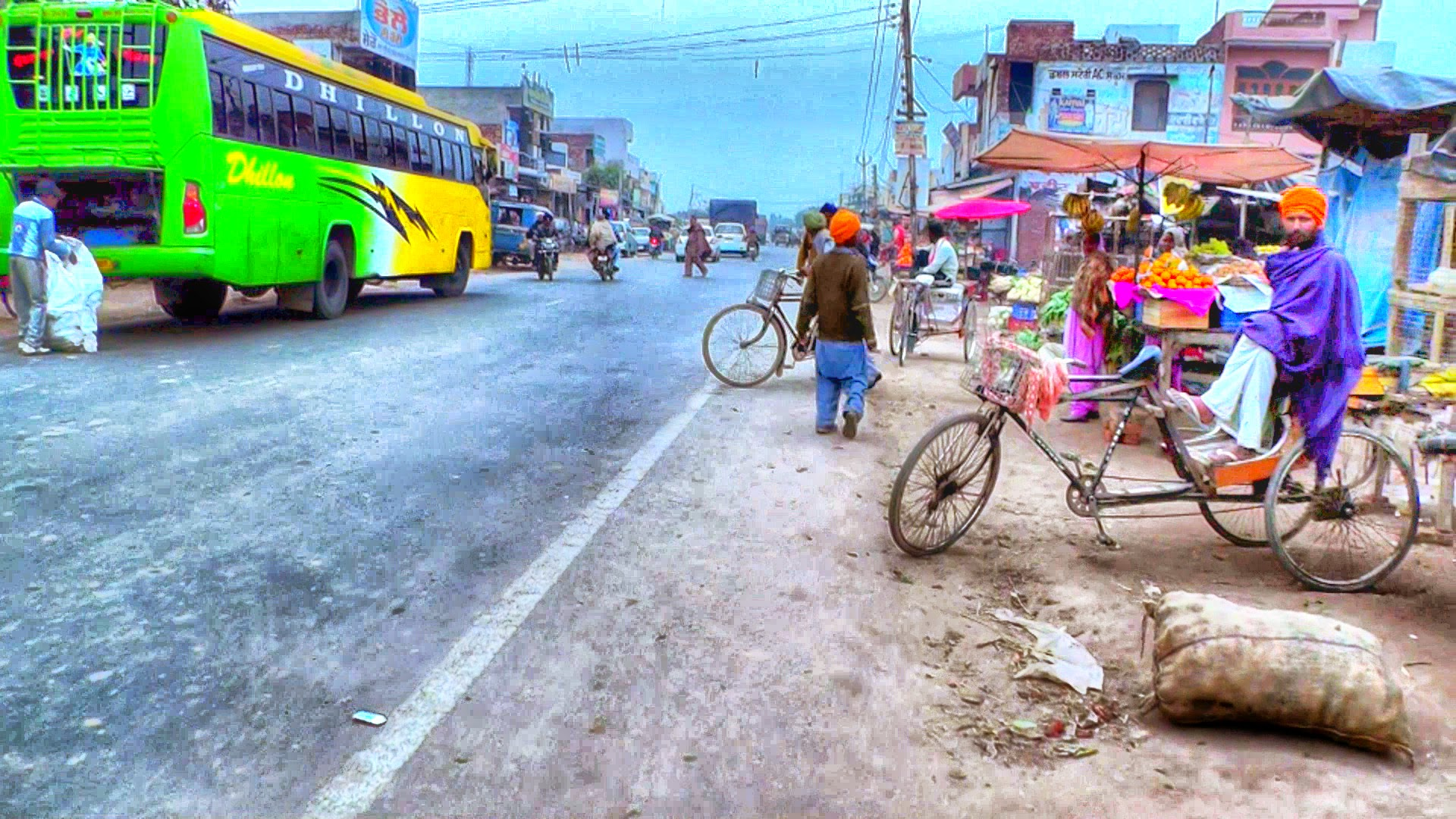

- Location in Punjab, India Naushehra Pannuan PB46 car bazaar (India)
- Coordinates: 31.3399°N 74.9537°E
- Country: India
- State: Punjab
- District: Tarn Taran

Government
  - Type: Republic
  - Body: Government of Punjab
- Elevation: 218 m (715 ft)

Population (2016)
  - Total: 13,936

Languages
  - Official: Punjabi
- Time zone: UTC+5:30 (IST)
- PIN: 143409
- Telephone code: 91 1852
- Vehicle registration: PB46
- Website: www.tarntarancity.com

Naushehra Pannuan is a large village located in the Tarn Taran district in the Indian State of Punjab. The village is believed to be the largest village of the Pannu Jatt Sikh clan. Naushehra holds a prominent position in Punjab state politics with a number of state politicians vying for candidacy in the Naushehra Constituency each year.

The village experienced violence during the military conflict between the Indian Government and Khalistani separatist groups in the 1980s.

== Demographics ==
As of the 2011 Census, the population of the village was 7,785, with 4,096 males and 3,689 females. The census also reported that the village has 4,943 literate and 2,842 illiterate persons.

== History ==
=== Origin ===
According to a local legend, the Pannu Jatt clan which established Naushehra Pannuan had originally lived near the village of Lachmann Maari in Batala. One morning, a woman belonging to this clan was harassed by a Muslim Chaudhry (hereditary landholder) who she killed with a stick. As a result, the clan had to leave that area and settle in the village of Jaura near Tarn Taran. One of the elders of the village became a disciple of Lord Nashriya Shah, who asked the clan to establish a new village, and they founded Naushehra at its current location. The village is named after the Lord Nashriya Shah. The ruins of his tomb and the adjoining mosque are in the northeastern section of the village in Desuwal Patti.

An alternative legend tells that the village was constructed by Baba Rassal under the spiritual guidance of Baba Mange Shah, the village's other patron. The legend states that Mange Shah blessed Baba Rassal with a 50 paise coin that would double each day. Baba Rassal used this money to construct the town and its mud-brick fortifications including the village walls and gates around the village. In return for his patronage and blessings, Baba Mange Shah asked Baba Rassal not to reveal the source of this money to anyone. However, Baba Rassal was increasingly pressed by his wife and revealed the source of the wealth. As a result, the money stopped doubling and work stopped abruptly. It is believed that this is the reason why the village fortifications appear unfinished. According to this legend, Baba Rassal had six sons, to whom he bequeathed six different pattis or sections of the village. Desuwal Patti is one of these original pattis.

=== 17th–18th Century ===
The 10th Sikh Guru, Guru Gobind Singh Ji, regularly communicated with the sangat (English: fellowship of believers) at Naushehra Pannuan through a set of Hukamnama (orders given in the form of hymns). Four of these formal orders were issued between 1699 and 1702 and are preserved at the local Baba Dhanna Gurudwara, a major place of Sikh worship. During this period, Baba Dhanna (from Naushehra Pannuan) served as the gardener of Sri Guru Gobind Singh Ji, the latter giving his kanga (English: comb) and dastaar (turban) to Baba Dhanna.

Hukamnama from Sri Gobind Singh Ji, to the Sangat at Naushehra: (translated) "To Naushehra Pannauan of Amritsar. Come to Diwali with the offerings for the Guru. Give to no one else. Send tola of gold by draft. Contributors will be blessed. Oct 5th, 1699"

People from Naushehra Pannuan played a major role in the rise of Sikh power during the Sikh Misl period, 1760–1790. People from Naushehra Pannuan were part of the Singh Krora Misl headed by Baghel Singh which conquered Delhi in 1783.

=== 19th Century ===
The first reference to Naushehra Pannuan in a book can be found in Buta Singh's Geographical description of Punjab written in the 1840s. In the book, he reports that Naushehra had "700 homes and 50 shops". He also mentioned that the land was owned by Pannu Jatts.

The first modern public-development project in Naushehra Pannuan was a local canal extension to the Upper Bari Doab irrigation network implemented by the British Raj in 1859. The villagers helped excavate this canal, and it has irrigated the local farmland since its construction.

The 1890 flu pandemic greatly affected Naushehra, killing a large percentage of its population. As a result of large-scale deaths, the villagers decided to abandon the original town centre, which they believed was riddled with rats, and relocated to outer areas of the other areas of punjab some village of pannu clan were found in malwa near ludhiana. The citizens of Naushehra moved to the new patti of Jagpur. Similarly, the villagers of nearby sub-village of Chaudriwala decided to move from the original town centre to the current location of Chaudriwala.

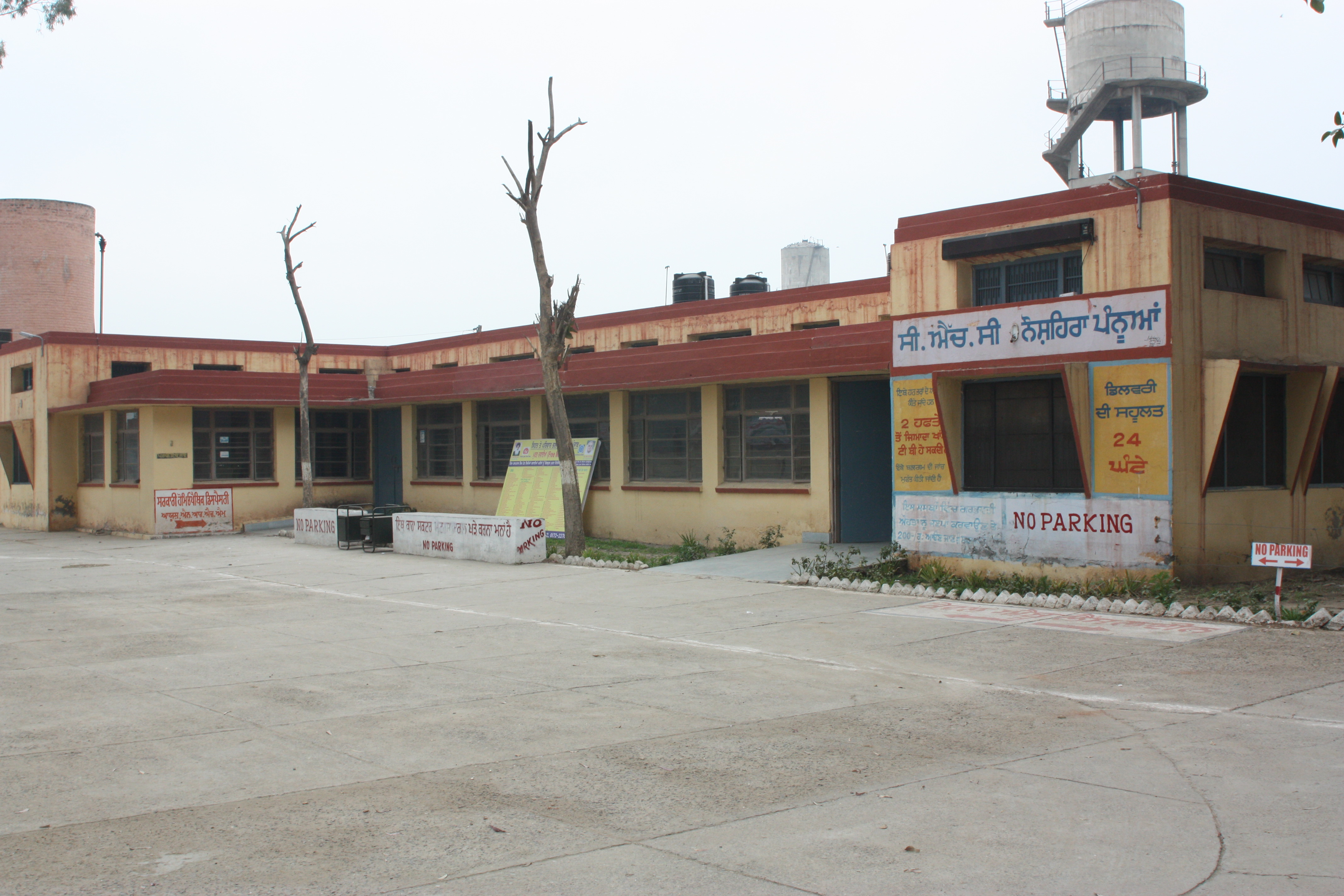
Hospital at Naushehra Pannuan

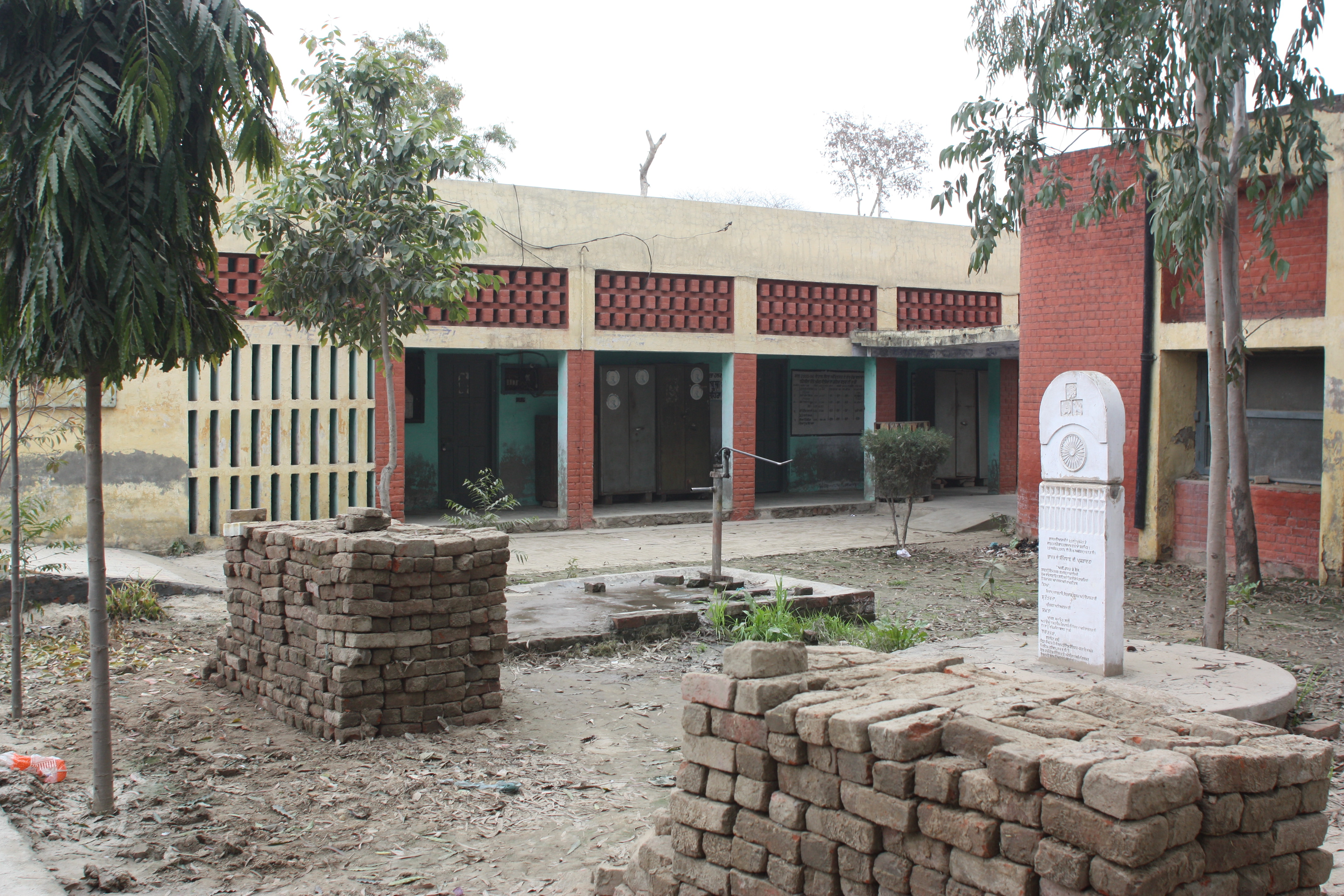
Block Development office at Naushehra Pannuan

=== 20th Century ===
==== Pre-independence ====
Development of Naushehra Pannuan continued with the construction of a primary and middle school in 1938. Their ruins can be seen in the north section of the village from National Highway 15. The post office located in the old bazaar was built during the British rule.

==== Independence and Partition of India ====
During the Partition of India in 1947, a large number of Naushehra Pannuan Muslim residents left their homes in the bazaar to move to Pakistan. These homes were taken over by the remaining villagers. One prominent Muslim's home was known to be near the village pond. The bricks and earthworks from this home were used to build a bridge that connects Naushehra and Chaudriwaal. Independence brought new institutions such as Gram Panchayat and Block-based administration. As a result of these new institutions, a steady stream of new developments rolled out. First was the previously mentioned bridge in 1956. This was the same year that senior secondary education came to Naushehra in the form of a senior secondary high school. The local Block development office was built in 1961, and was instrumental in rural development around Naushehra Pannuan.

==== 1980s ====
During the turmoil of the 1980s, as a village located in the rural Majha region, Naushehra Pannuan suffered due to conflict. The village was a battleground between government and militant forces for much of the late 1980s. Several drive-by shootings occurred during this period. One such shooting in 1983 resulted in the deaths of three Hindus. As a result, a number of Hindu families felt a threat to their lives and moved from the village. Some Hindu families were defiant in the face of adversity and resolved to stay in the village. A number of Sikh families chose to leave India to escape the troubles.

== Gurudwaras, temples and shrines ==
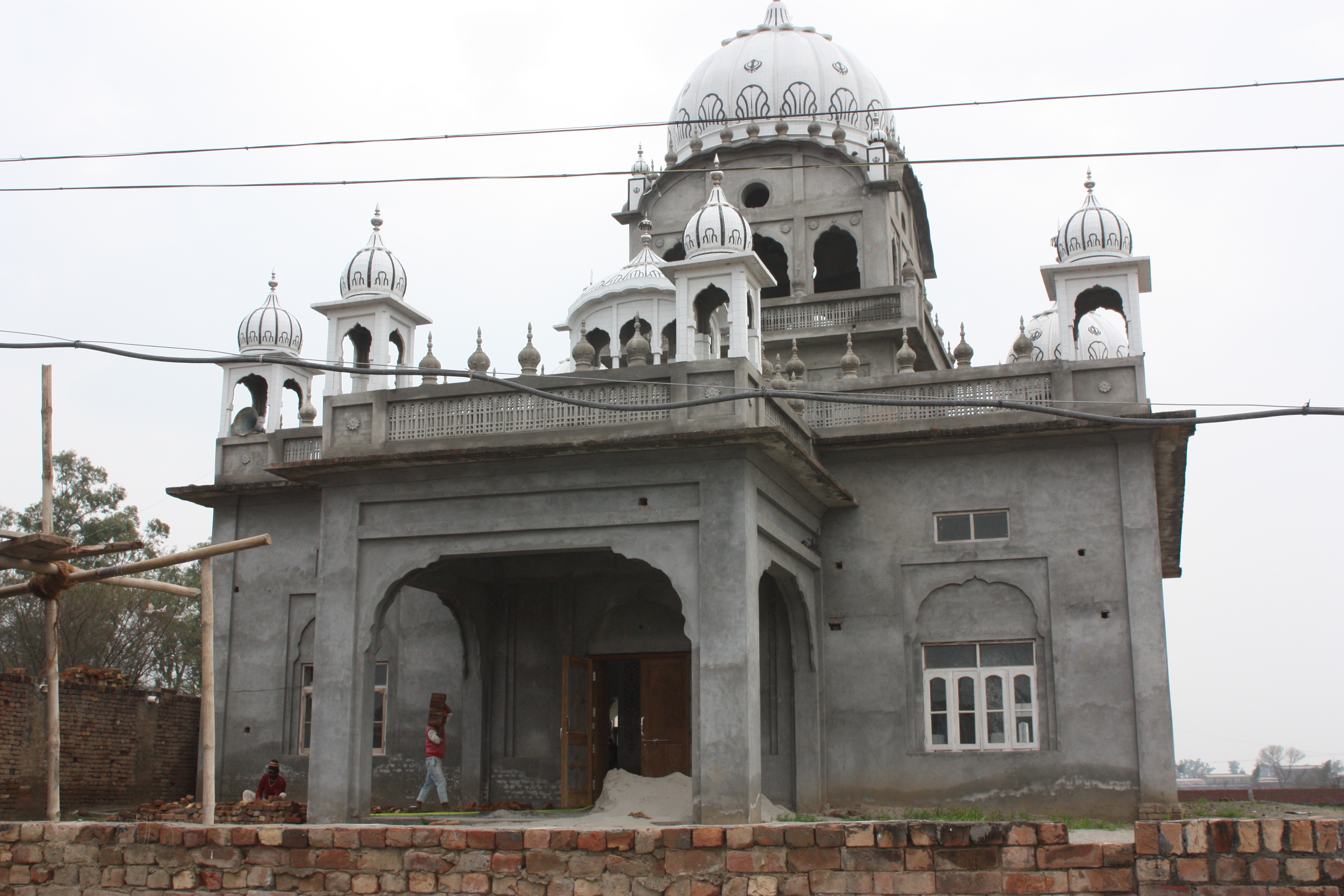
Gangwala Gurudwara

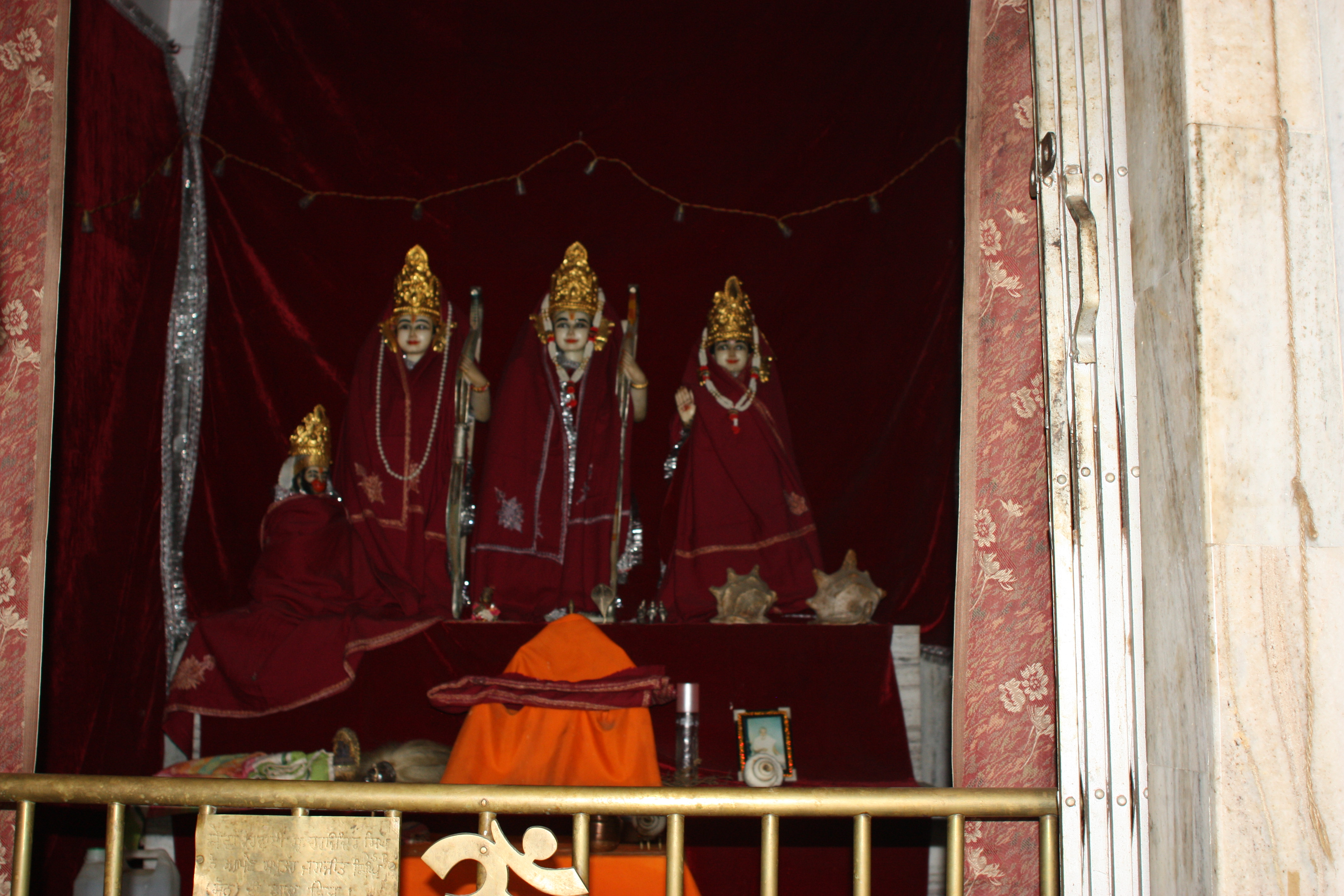
Thakurdwara at Naushehra Pannuan

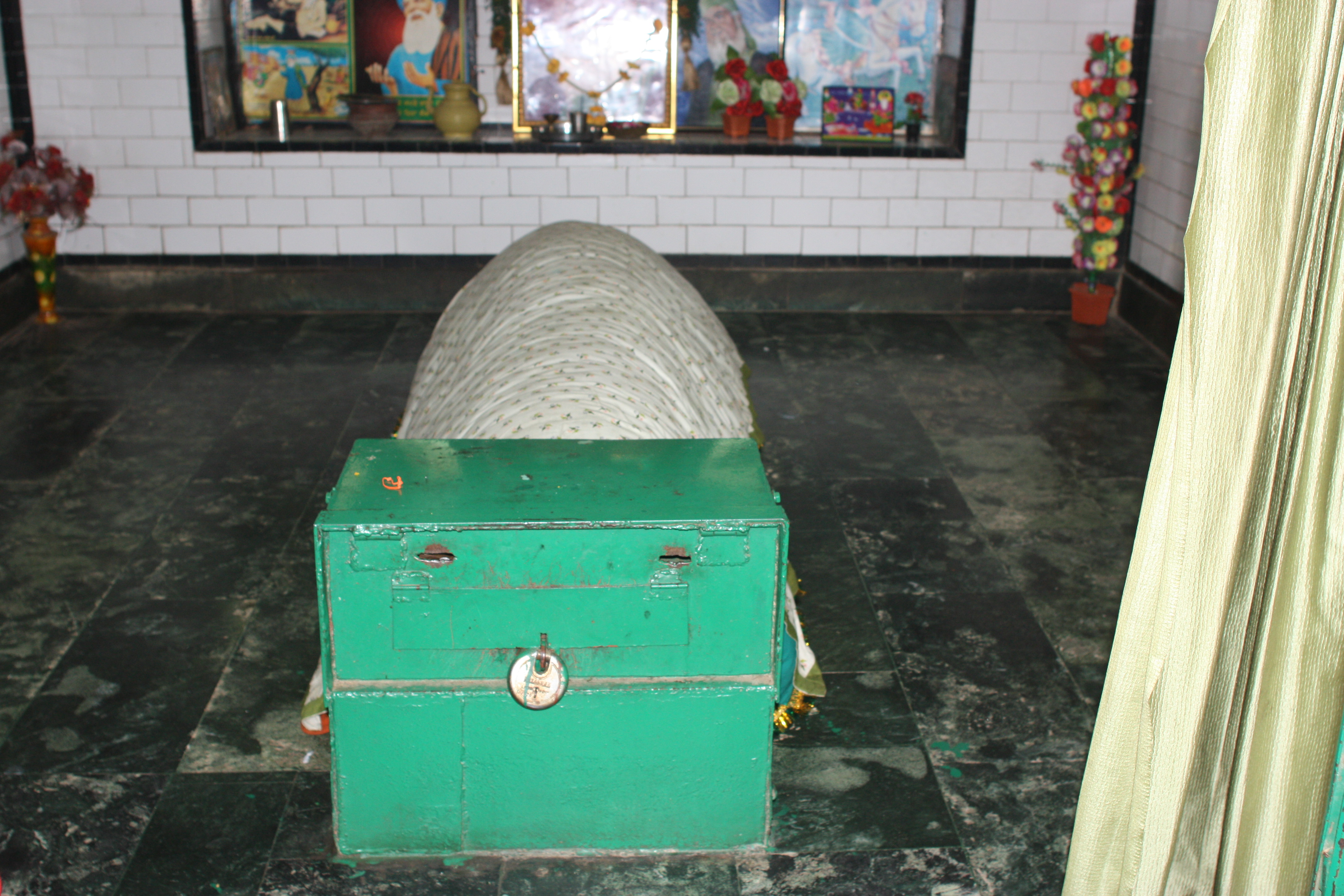
Mange Shah Samadh

The village features centres of worship for various different religions and belief systems. A major Sikh place of worship is the prominent Baba Dhanna Gurudwara on the National Highway 15. This gurudwara is dedicated to Baba Dhanna who was the gardener of the Sri Guru Gobind Singh Ji, and preserves the latter's letters to the village. The gurudwara was reconstructed in the late 1980s. Other Sikh places of worship include Jaggu ki Patti Gurudwara and Gang wala Gurudwara.

Thakurdwara is a major Hindu temple near the village bazaar. The two patron saints/peers of the village have their shrines in the Desuwaal region. Baba Mange shah Samadh received patronage and popularity over the last 30 years and have since been rebuilt and reconstructed. The site is used for a major religious festival in the honor of Baba Mange Shah, who is considered the founder-saint of the village.

== Education ==
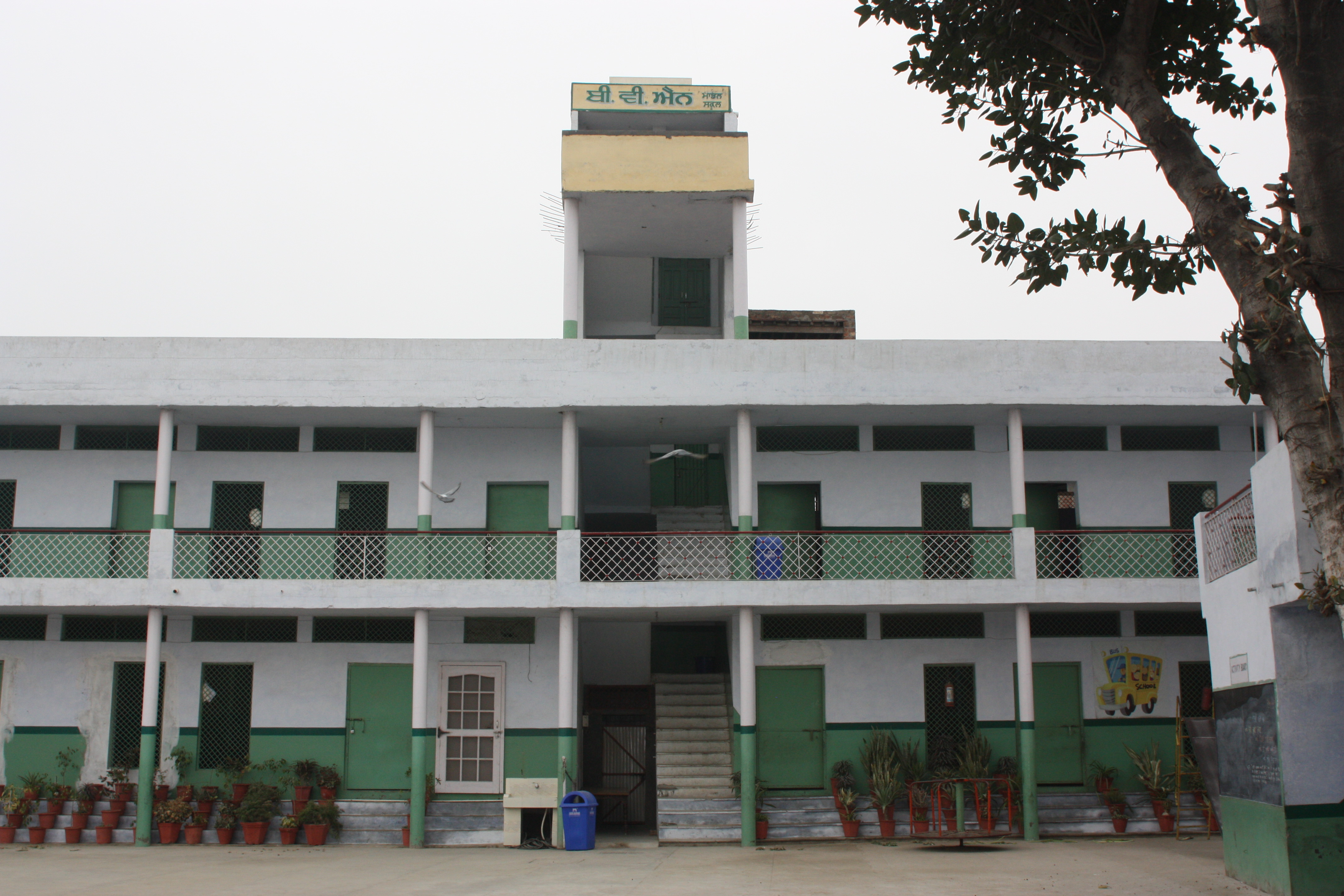
BVN School

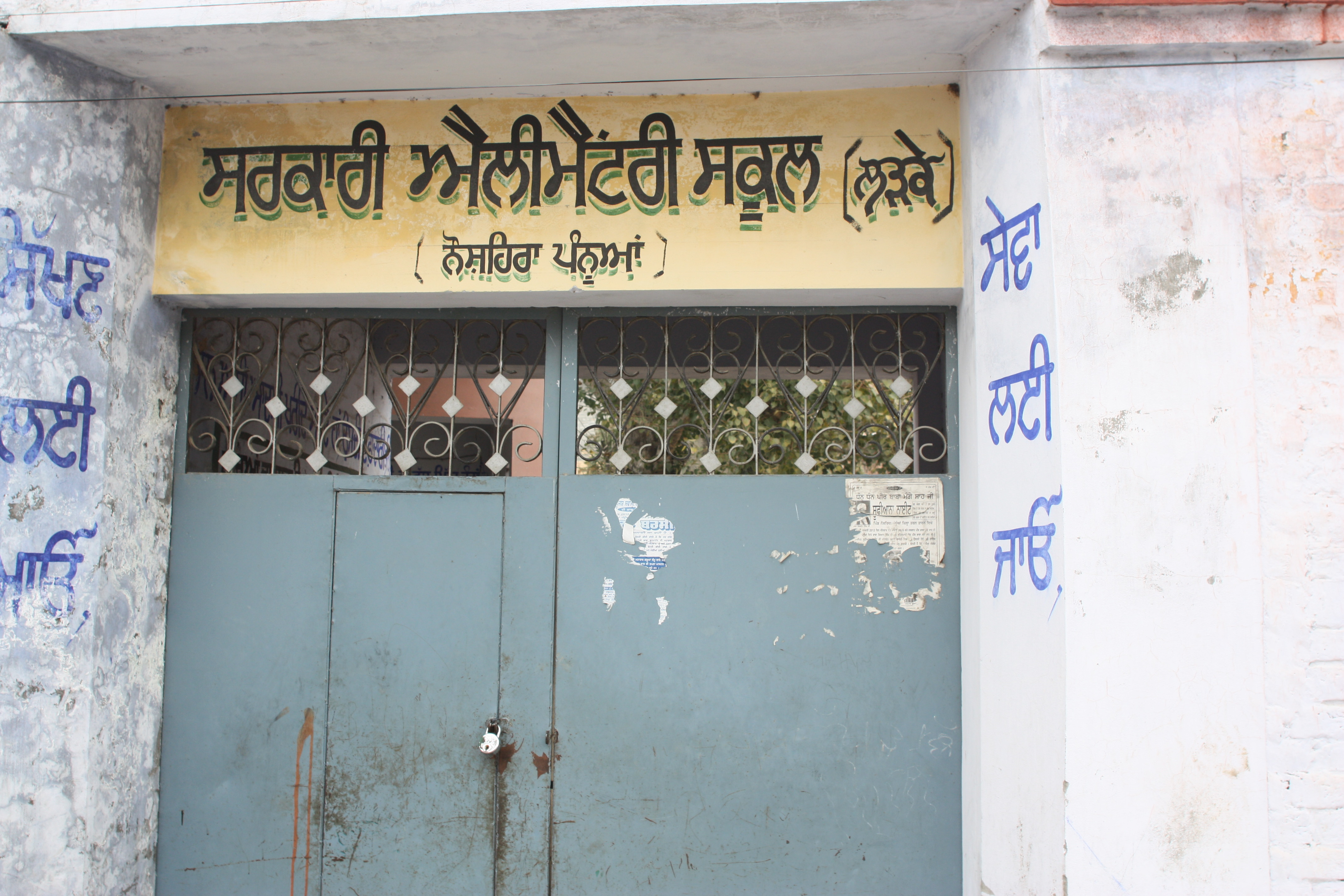
Sarkari Elementary School

The village features many schools at a primary and senior secondary level, which are affiliated with the Punjab School Education Board and the Central Board of Secondary Education. Here is the list of major schools in the village:

- Government Senior Secondary School
- National Public School, G.T. Road
- B.V.N Model School
- Government Primary School
- Oxford Public School

== Rivalry and animosity with Sarhali ==
Until late in the 20th century, the villages of Sarhali and Naushehra Pannuan were known for their intense rivalry. Marriages between residents of the villages were taboo.

According to a local legend, Baba Rassal chose two suiters from Sarhali for marriage with his daughters. Two of his sons accompanied the brides to Sarhali to deliver them safely on their wedding day. The two brothers were invited on a hunting trip by the grooms, during which a fight broke out and the brothers were murdered by the Sarhali grooms. The daughters of Baba Rassal were given the heads of their brothers to take back to their home village, where Baba Rassal and Naushehra sought retribution. They lured the Sarhali villagers with the pretext of reconciliation through another marital alliance, and when the baraat (English: groom's wedding procession) arrived the Naushehra villagers murdered them. This was followed by a series of revenge massacres. It is believed that the villagers maintain a watch for approaching mobs from the rival village.

It is said that the watchtower of Naushehra Pannuan was near the neighbouring town of Kheda.

== Gallery ==
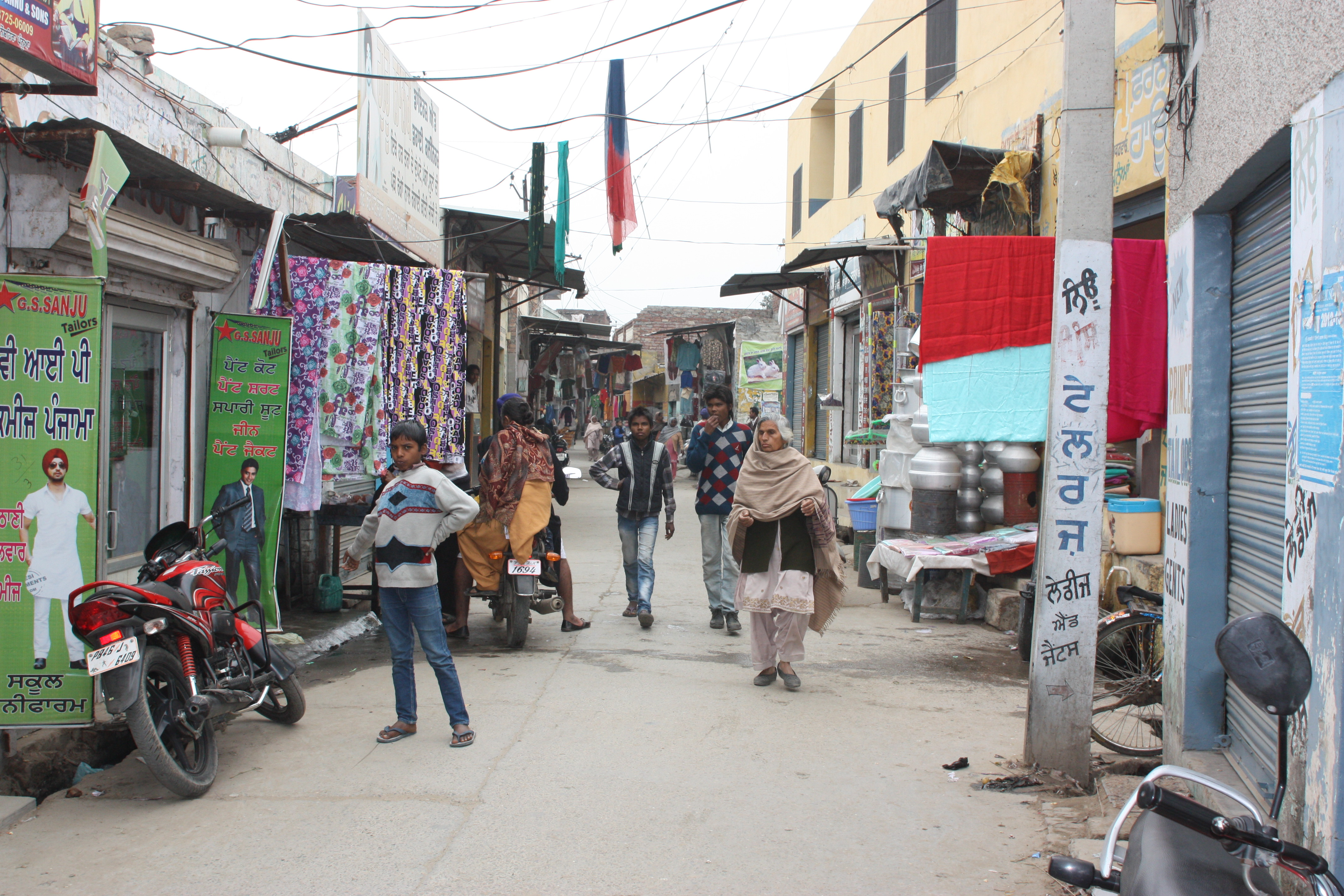
Naushehra Pannuan Bazaar

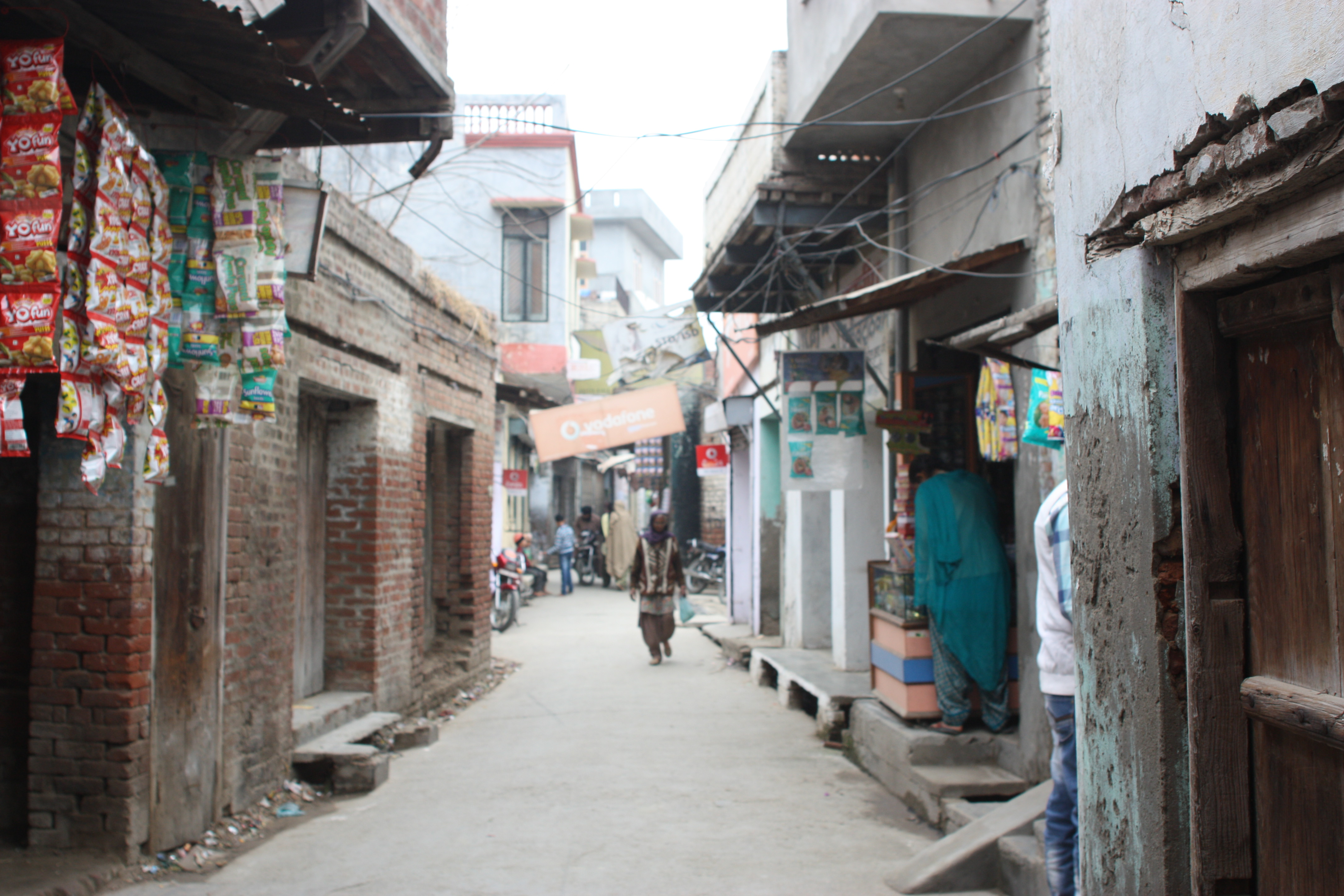
Old Bazaar in Naushehra

== Notable people ==
- Balbir Singh Pannu (Ex- Sr Vice President SGPC )
- Sartaj Singh Pannu, Film producer and director
- Lieutenant Colonel Kulwant Singh Pannu, Indian Army officer who fought in the 1971 Indo-Pakistan War
- Gurpreet Singh, Sport shooter, Commonwealth Games 2010, currently serving in the Indian Army.
