= Nizam Lohar =

Punjabi Muslim activist (1835–1877)

Nizam Lohar Rehzaan-e-Jhankaar Badshah-e-Darakht
- Born: 1835; Tarn Taran, Amritsar, Sikh Empire
- Died: 1877 (aged 41—42); Kasur, Lahore District, Punjab, British India
- Cause of death: Gun firings
- Resting place: Kasur, Punjab, Pakistan; 31°07′35″N 74°27′21″E
- Occupation: Blacksmith
- Years active: 1869—77
- Known for: Resistance against British Raj
- Movement: Quit Punjab movement (1873—77)

Nizam Lohar (Punjabi: نظام لوہار; 1835 – 1877) was a revolutionary who rebelled against the colonial government that led to bloodshed which sent shockwaves throughout Britain. In Punjab, he and others defied repressive laws of the government, looted government officers and rich people and fought against the oppression of the authorities. They were nationalist freedom fighters struggling for the cause of freedom. However, the colonial government labelled them as dacoits.

== Early life ==
Nizam Lohar was born on 1835 at Tarn Taran Sahib to a poor Punjabi Muslim family. He was born during the reign of Maharaja Ranjit Singh in the Sikh Empire. In 1849, when he was 13 or 14, the Sikh Empire was annexed by the Company's government. By profession, he was a blacksmith who used to make weapons for the government and lived with his mother and a sister. From an early age, he opposed British rule in India. His family and friends were not very happy about this and advised him to stay away from such kind of ideology.

== Rebellion ==
British imperial expansion in the 1860s caused hatred and opposition among many natives, including Nizam. During this period, momentum of freedom fighters and their plans of waging a unified struggle against the British rule were gaining considerable grounds. It is believed that once in 1868, Nizam got into an argument with a British official who insulted Punjab and as a result, the quarrel heated up and Nizam ended up killing him after which he joined Jeet Singh and Malkeet Singh, both prominent proponents of the Babbar Akali movement. He supported the movement by producing and providing required weapons and also started attacking government officials and distributing their money and valuables to the local poor people, just like the Robin Hood, who was a heroic outlaw in the English folklore. As a result, his strict surveillance was started by the British police on the denouncement of his activities of meeting and supporting rebels of 'Tehreek-e-Jang-e-Azadi' or the Independence movement, which led him to stay outside of his home most of the times and sometimes evaded the authorities through the use of the Changa-Manga forest (based on the names of the two dacoits, Changa and Manga, who escaped British prison and disappeared in the forest, looting travellers) jungle as a safe haven.

One day in 1872, in his absence, several weapons were taken into possession from the cellar in his home by the police. It is also suggested that the Police Captain Coll had raped his sister, which led her mother to death and Nizam to murder Captain Coll next night at the police station along with the murder of SP Ronald and other officers after few days. Soon he became a local hero and received support from the community. Later he freed Jabru (who belonged to Kasur) and Sooja Singh from British captivity who became his friends. Next year, they started a movement together called 'Punjab Chhado (Quit Punjab movement)', which attracted many outlaws and rebels, and planned for a bloody revolution against the 'servants' of the British targeting large sum of officers in fairs and gatherings across Punjab.

In 1877, when Nizam went to see Sooja's ill mother, he learnt of Sooja's affair with a prostitute which was affecting Sooja's attention towards his mother and the movement. Nizam confronted him with anger and had a row over his passions affecting the movement and his own personal life. The prostitute started provoking Sooja against Nizam which lead Sooja to denounce Nizam's whereabouts and intentions at a police station.

== Martyrdom ==
Acting upon Sooja's piece of information, the police surrounded Nizam's place. There was a crossfire between police and Nizam that lasted an hour in which Nizam died. Furious over the betrayal of his son, Sooja's mother murdered him in front of Jabru and told him to remain a witness of this murder and the motive behind it. Due to a huge number of people willing to attend, it is believed that British authorities set a fee of 2 rupees per attendee on Nizam's funeral and gathered a revenue of 35,000 rupees at that time, as 17,500 people attended the funeral.

== In popular culture ==
The story of Nizam Lohar has appeared many times, in many different variations, in popular modern works throughout Pakistan’s history. The following are some of the notable depictions in film and television:

=== Films ===
- Nizam Lohar: starring Neelo, Yasmeen & Allaudin; directed by Jamil Akhter (1966)
- Nizam Daku: starring Yousaf Khan, Sultan Rahi & Salma Mumtaz; directed by Waheed Dar (1979)
- Nizam: starring Naghma, Sudhir & Sultan Rahi; directed by Sudhir.
- Nizam Lohar (2001) starting Saud, Sana and Noor; directed by Hasnain

=== Television ===
- Nizam Lohar: starring Firdous Jamal; directed by Rashid Dar; written by Amjad Islam Amjad
