= Ritu Singh (activist) =

Indian rights activist and academic

Ritu Singh (b. circa 1989) is an Indian Dalit rights activist. She was associated with Daulat Ram College, Delhi University. She is a scholar of psychology notable for her protests against unfair dismissal.

== Early life ==
She is from the Tarn Taran district of Punjab and completed her PhD in Psychology from Delhi University.

== Activism ==
She staged a protest in front of Art Faculty, North Campus, Delhi University in September 2023 against alleged caste harassment and illegal termination from services. After enrolling at Daulatram College in 2019 as an ad-hoc assistant professor, Dr. Singh was fired after just one year and her contract was not extended. Her protest was against the college administration. She accused the college administrator of violating MHRD guidelines.

After the 192 days of protest, she open a pakoda stall PhD Pakode Wali in front of the Art Faculty, DU. On this, Delhi police have booked Dr Ritu Singh under the Indian Penal Code (IPC) Section 283 (danger or obstruction in public way or line of navigation), a formal complaint has been filed against Dr. Singh.

Students and Civil Societies have come forward in her support. Dalit political party Bhim Army supporters have also joined her in the protest. They have demanded justice by giving solidarity to her demand - 'naukri nahi nyay chahiye,' (I am not fighting for my job, I demand justice).

== See also ==
- Dalit
- Bhim Army
