= Patti, Punjab =

Patti
- Old City
- Location in Punjab, India Patti (India)
- Coordinates: 31.28°N 74.86°E
- Country: India
- State: Punjab
- District: Tarn Taran
- Nearest city: Tarn Taran Sahib and Amritsar

Government
  - Member of Parliament: Amritpal Singh (IND)
  - Member of Legislative Assembly: Laljit Singh Bhullar (AAP)
- Elevation: 209 m (686 ft)

Population (2011)
  - Total: 40,976

Languages
  - Official: Punjabi
- Time zone: UTC+5:30 (IST)
- PIN Code: 143416
- Telephone code: 01851[area code]
- Vehicle registration: PB 38

Patti is an old city, near Tarn Taran Sahib city and a municipal council of the Tarn Taran district in the Majha region of Indian state of Punjab, located 47 Kilometres from Amritsar. Patti city is situated close to the Pakistani border. It is connected through a rail network starting from Amritsar station to Khem Karan station, with Khem Karan being its last station of India.

Patti was a residence of Rai Duni Chand, a rich landlord, one of whose daughters, Bibi Rajni was a known devotee of Guru Ram Das Ji. Mughal Governor of Punjab during Mughal period also lived in Patti. Before independence, Patti was a Tehsil of the Lahore district. The city houses a historic Mughal Fort and remains of the city wall as well as a number of other historical and religious places. Nowadays Patti is developing rapidly but economy of the city is still largely dependent on agriculture and allied activities. There are a number of colleges and schools. Patti has become the first border town in Punjab where all eligible beneficiaries are vaccinated with the first dose of the COVID-19 vaccine and has become an example for other areas in Punjab. The vaccination drive ran under leadership of Dr. Gursimran Singh, a young medical officer working at a local government hospital.

== Etymology ==
Patti (Punjabi: ਪੱਟੀ) in Punjabi means street. The original name of this city was Patti Haibatpura, but over a certain period Patti became its name, and gradually displaced the former.

== History ==
Prior to the partition, Patti was a Sub-tehsil of Lahore district's Kasur tahsil. After Amritsar revenue district was split in two, it became a part of the newly created Tarn Taran district. Patti has been a power center and by some estimates it has been so for as long as 1000 years. In the medieval days it was known as 9 lakhi Patti. That means it generated high revenue of Rupees 9 Lakhs. The city has stories of a certain haveli, of its rulers Mirzas, which was destroyed for farming activity later on, as they migrated to Lahore (Pakistan) in 1947.

The city is situated on a mound which adds to its altitude. To the south-east of the city is a smaller but higher mound which projects a Shiva Temple Shiva . Patti houses a fortress built in 1755, which housed the local police station up-till the year 2003.

Patti finds rich references in the Sikh history, especially when there were increased atrocities committed by the Mughal Empire on Sikh Jatthedars (raiders) who looted the residents of the city. The fortress was used to prosecute rebels. The tales of which became a part of everyday Sikh prayer.

In the battle of misls, Patti was ultimately won by Faisailpuria (Singhpuria) Misl. Rumours suggest that Maharaja Ranjit Singh sent his army to siege the town when Mirza Talib Ali Baig rebelled against him for Sikh atrocities on Muslims, particularly banning of their call for prayer (Azan). During this siege, part of the outer wall was demolished.

Patti is also referenced as a place of the Pir (Sufism) and there were many houses of Pirs who belonged to Gillani's family. There are also shirines of Gillani's family. After the partition, the Gillani family settled in Pakistan. Patti is mentioned as 'putee', having a population of 5000, in 19th century historical book "travels into Bokhara" by Alexander Burnes.

== Demographics ==
As of 2011 Indian Census, Patti had a total population of 40,976, of which 21,668 were males and 19,308 were females. The sex ratio is 891. Population within the age group of 0 to 6 years was 4,595. The total number of literates in Patti was 28,290, which constituted 69.0% of the population with male literacy of 72.6% and female literacy of 65.0%. The effective literacy rate of 7+ population of Patti was 77.8%, of which male literacy rate was 82.1% and female literacy rate was 72.9%. The Scheduled Castes population was 10,346. Patti had 7607 households in 2011.

The table below shows the population of different religious groups in Patti city, as of 2011 census.

Population by religious groups in Patti city, 2011 census
Religion	Total	Female	Male
Sikh	30,432	14,291	16,141
Hindu	9,743	4,639	5,104
Jain	511	243	268
Christian	133	64	69
Muslim	100	38	62
Buddhist	3	1	2
Other religions	7	4	3
Not stated	47	28	19
Total	40,976	19,308	21,668

== Politics ==
The city is part of the Patti Assembly Constituency.

== Transportation ==
Patti has a railway station and a bus terminal. Patti is located centrally and equidistant from other important towns of the area like Harike, Bhikhiwind, Valtoha, etc.

== Schools in Patti City ==
- Doon Public School
- G M Arya School
- D.A.V sen. sec school
- Morning Star Sen. Sec School
- Sacred Heart Convent School
- Cambridge International School
- Central Convent School
- Super Kidz PlaySchool
- Satluj Public School
- Shaheed Bhagat Singh sen sec school
- Sri Guru Harkrishan sen. sec. school
- Futech Computer Education Centre
- Wood Blossom School
- Shri Mahavir Jain Model High School

=== Colleges in Patti City ===
- Guru Nanak Dev University
- Shiv Shankar Institute of Engeenering and Technology.
- Shaheed Bhagat Singh Polytechnic & Pharmacy College
- Futech Computer Education Centre ( Computer Institutes)

==== Gurudwara in Patti City ====
- Baba Bidhi Chand Ji Gurudwara
- Bibi Rajni Ji Gurudwara

== Patti Sub-tahsil ==
Patti Sub-Tehsil was created as a subdivision within Kasur Tahsil of Lahore District in British Punjab, comprising the 186 villages and the towns of Patti and Khem Karan that were allocated to East Punjab (India) under the Radcliffe Award after Partition in 1947. Kasur Tahsil originally contained 322 villages and 3 towns—Kasur, Patti, and Khem Karan—with the remaining 136 villages, including Kasur town, remaining in West Punjab (Pakistan).

The 1941 census does not provide separate demographic data specifically for Patti Sub-Tehsil. The available data includes only overall figures for Kasur Tahsil and individual details for the three towns—Patti, Khem Karan, and Kasur. Therefore, estimates for Patti Sub-Tehsil’s population and religious composition are generally derived by combining the town-level data with proportional analysis of the entire Kasur Tahsil figures.

The estimated population of Patti Sub-Tehsil was derived by first subtracting the urban town populations from the total Kasur Tahsil figures to calculate the rural population. Since 186 out of 322 villages (approximately 58%) of the tahsil were awarded to India under the Radcliffe Award, 58% of the rural population was allocated to Patti Sub-Tehsil. The final estimate includes this rural segment along with the town populations of Patti and Khem Karan.

The following census tables summarize the religious demographics of the Patti region in 1941, based on data from Kasur Tahsil (British Punjab).

=== Kasur tahsil (1941) Demographics ===
Category	Total Population	Hindus	%	Sikhs	%	Muslim	%	Christian	%	Jain	%	Others	%
Kasur tahsil	414,495	34,682	8.37	123,446	29.78	237,036	57.19	18,514	4.47	809	0.20	8	0.00
Kasur rural	335,780	19,843	5.91	118,906	35.41	179,418	53.43	17,611	5.24	0	0.00	2	0.00
Kasur Urban	78,715	14,839	18.85	4,540	5.77	57,618	73.19	903	1.15	809	1.03	6	0.01
Kasur town	53,101	10,752	20.25	2,034	3.83	39,295	74.00	562	1.06	450	0.85	6	0.01
Patti Town	17,595	2,823	16.04	1,495	8.50	12,879	73.20	37	0.21	359	2.05	0	0.00
KhemKaran Town	8,023	1,264	15.75	1,011	12.60	5,444	67.85	304	3.79	0	0.00	0	0.00

=== Patti Sub-tahsil (1941) Demographics Estimated ===
Patti Sub-tahsil (1941) Demographics Estimated
Category	Total Population	Hindus	%	Sikhs	%	Muslim	%	Christain	%	Jain	%	Others	%
Patti(Town)	17,595	2,823	16.04	1,495	8.50	12,879	73.20	37	0.21	359	2.05	0	0.00
KhemKaran(Town)	8,023	1,264	15.75	1,011	12.60	5,444	67.85	304	3.79	0	0.00	0	0.00
Rural(186Villages) (Estimated)	~58% × 335,780 = 194,751	~58%× 19843= 11509	5.91	~58% × 118,906= 68,966	35.41	~58%× 179,418= 104,062	53.43	~58%× 17,611= 10215	5.24	~58%× 0= 0	0.00	~58%× 2= 1	0.00
Total Patti sub-tahsil(Estimated)	220,369	15,596	7.08	71,472	32.43	122,385	55.54	10,556	4.79	359	0.16	1	0.00
Total Rest Kasur Sub-tahsil(Estimated)	194,126	19,086	9.83	51,974	26.77	114,651	59.06	7,958	4.10	450	0.23	7	0.00
