= Maniyala Jai Singh Wala =

Manihala Jai Singh Wala
- village
- location in Punjab, India Manihala Jai Singh Wala (India)
- Coordinates: 31.287986°N 74.786113°E
- country: India
- state: Punjab
- District: Tarn Taran
- block: Patti
- Time zone: UTC+5: 30 (Indian Standard Time)
- nearby city: Tarn Taran

== History ==
Manhala Jai Singh, formerly known as Manhala, is a village located in the Majha Region of southern Punjab, to the west of Patti town. The village was founded by the Batth Jatt Zamandirs and was historically part of the Patti Pargana region, where the members of the local Batth Jatt Chaudhries family held feudal land Jagirs in Manhala, Mughal Wala, and Kulla. The Sixth Sikh Guru, Guru Hargobind Sahib Jee, is known to have visited Manhala with Sikh soldiers and stayed opposite to the house of the Batth Jatt Chaudhries on an open space in the centre of the village. A platform at the site is believed to have been constructed in honour of this visit.

The Bhangi Sikh Misl, led by Sardar Hari Singh Dhillon, saw an influx of members in the early mid-1700s when the Mughal power faded from the region. Two of these new members were Godh Singh and Uttam Singh, the sons of Chaudhri Bulaki Batth of Manhala. The Batth Sikh sardars proved an influential family in their area, with a documented history provided in the book entitled Sardar Gharaane of Punjab. This prestige was further noted by Lieutenant Governor Lepel H.Griffen in his book Chiefs of Punjab, published in 1865, which records the Rajas and Chiefs of Punjab.
