= Banwalipur =

- Village
- Location in Punjab, India Banwalipur (India)
- Coordinates: 31.404806°N 74.947506°E
- Country: India
- State: Punjab
- District: Kapurthala

Government
  - Type: Panchayati raj (India)
  - Body: Gram panchayat

Population (2011)
  - Total: 713
- Sex ratio 362/351♂/♀

Languages
  - Official: Punjabi
- Time zone: UTC+5:30 (IST)
- PIN: 144623
- Telephone code: 01822
- ISO 3166 code: IN-PB
- Vehicle registration: PB-09
- Website: kapurthala.gov.in

Banwalipur is a village in Kapurthala district of Punjab State, India. It is located 16 kilometres (9.9 mi) from Kapurthala, which is both district and sub-district headquarters of Banwalipur. The village is administrated by a Sarpanch who is an elected representative.

== Demography ==
According to the 2011 Census of India, Banwalipur had a total number of 158 houses and a population of 713, of which 362 were males and 351 females. The literacy rate was 77.37%, higher than state average of 75.84%. The population of children under the age of 6 years was 59, which represented 8.27% of the total population. The child sex ratio was approximately 1107, higher than the state average of 846. UK born businessman Jaswant Singh Deo hails from Banwalipur

== Population data ==
| Particulars | Total | Male | Female |
|---|---|---|---|
| Total No. of Houses | 158 | - | - |
| Population | 713 | 362 | 351 |
| Child (0–6) | 59 | 28 | 31 |
| Schedule Caste | 386 | 194 | 192 |
| Schedule Tribe | 0 | 0 | 0 |
| Literacy | 77.37 % | 83.53 % | 70.94 % |
| Total Workers | 184 | 170 | 14 |
| Main Worker | 173 | 0 | 0 |
| Marginal Worker | 11 | 7 | 4 |
