= Gurdwara Sri Tarn Taran Sahib =

Sikh gurdwara in Tarn Taran Sahib, India

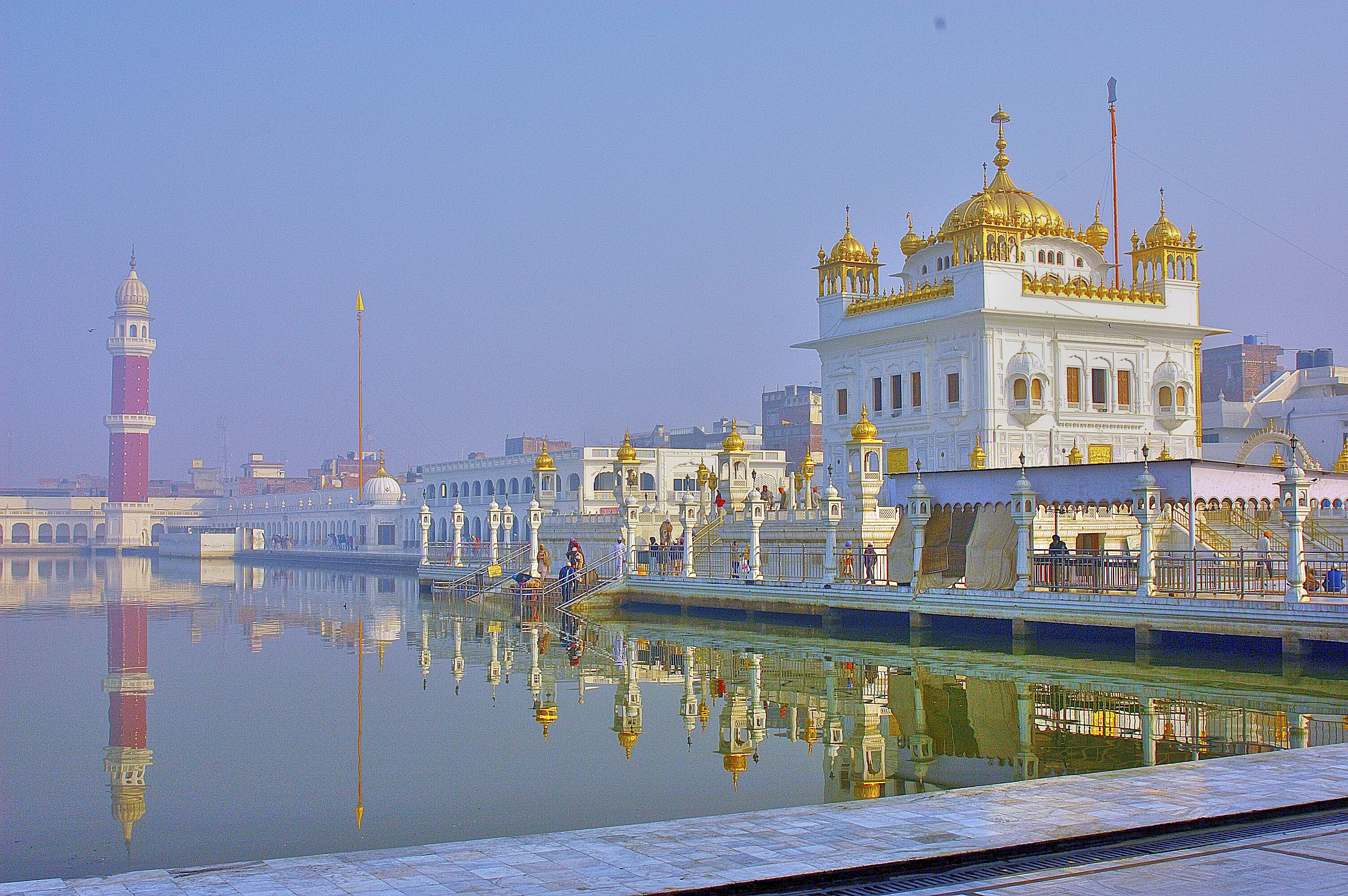
- Gurdwara Sri Tarn Taran Sahib

- Location within Punjab Location within India Location within Asia

Religion
- Affiliation: Sikhism

Location
- Location: Tarn Taran Sahib
- State: Punjab
- Country: India
- Coordinates: 31.4507°N 74.9251°E

Architecture
- Type: Gurdwara
- Style: Sikh architecture
- Founder: Guru Arjan Dev

Gurdwara Sri Tarn Taran Sahib, officially Gurdwara Sri Darbar Sahib, is a gurdwara established by the fifth guru, Guru Arjan Dev, in the city of Tarn Taran Sahib, Punjab, India. The site has the distinction of having the largest sarovar (water pond) of all the gurdwaras. It is famous for the monthly gathering of pilgrims on the day of Amavas (a no-moon night). It is near Harmandir Sahib, Amritsar.

== History ==
=== Sikh gurus (1469–1708) ===
Guru Arjan Dev Ji, the Fifth Sikh Guru, bought the land around Tarn Taran for 157,000 mohar. Jatt Chaudhri (Chief) of Thathi Khara Village Amrik Dhillon did prayer before the asked guru sahib to stay at Thathi Khara while the Kaar Seva was ongoing, in the year Sambat 1647 (1590) in the Land of Majha Region the traditional home of the Sikh Faith. At that time, the digging of the lake tank started. When the tank was completed, it was the biggest and largest sarovar lake in the whole of Panjab. The foundation stone of Darbar Sahib was laid by Dhan Dhan Baba Buddha Ji, a famous Sikh saint (1506–1631). During the time of Guru Arjan Dev Jee a vast number of Sakhi Sarwar (Sultanis) followers became Sikhs mainly the Jatt Zamindars and Chaudhries of this area including Chaudhri Langah Dhillon of Chabal Kalan who held chaudhriyat of 84 villages. The Sixth Sikh Guru, Guru Hargobind Sahib, came to the gurdwara and stayed for some time where Gurdwara Manji Sahib is built. Guru Tegh Bahadur, the ninth Sikh Guru, also visited Tarn Taran Sahib via Baba Bakala Sahib, Sathiala, Wazir Bhullar, Goindwal Sahib and Khadur Sahib and preached to the Sikh sangat (congregations).

=== Sikh Misl period (1748–1801) ===
Baba Bota Singh Sandhu of Padhana and Baba Garja Singh Jee would stay at Tarn Taran during day time. Both Singh warriors attained martyrdom in 1739 against a Mughal force sent against them at Sarai Nurdin near Tarn Taran Sahib.

Shaheed Baba Deep Singh (1682–1757) made a mark on the ground at Tarn Taran Sahib, and he asked the Sikhs if they were ready to die fighting against the enemies before entering into war against the Afghan invaders in 1757.

Tarn Taran Sahib was part of the Bhangi Misl one of the many Sikh Confederacies, which ruled over a greater part of Majha Region from being active in the 1750s to de facto power in the 1760s to 1802.

In 1768 Sardar Budh Singh Virk of Singhpuria Misl who was a descendant of Jatt Chaudhri Duleep Singh Virk and a relative of Nawab Kapur Singh Virk (1697–1753) the great heroic Sikh warrior and leader of the Sikhs in their fight against Mughal tyranny. Maharaja Jassa Singh Ramgarhia (1723–1803) of Ramgarhia Misl joined hands to rebuild the Darbar Sahib Tarn Taran. Which then was in a shape of a traditional mud building.

=== Sikh Empire period (1799–1849) ===
Later Maharaja Ranjit Singh Sher-e-Panjab (1799–1839), who visited Darbar Sahib Tarn Taran from 1802 to 1837, reconstructed the present Darbar Sahib Tarn Taran in 1836–1837 and also completed the work of the Parikarma which had been left unfinished by the two Sardars Singhpuria Misl and Ramgarhia Misl. Sher-e-Panjab gold-plated the Darbar Sahib Tarn Taran, as he did with the Harmandir Sahib at Amritsar and Kashi Vishwanath Temple in Varanasi . Artisans were called in by the Maharaja of Panjab Kingdom to decorate the inside of Darbar Sahib Tarn Taran.

Sher-e-Panjab built many massive gate entrances in Tarn Taran in which elephants could easily go through. When Maharaja Nau Nihal Singh (1821–1840) the grandson of Sher-e-Panjab, came to Tarn Taran, he built a minar (tower) at the end of the sarovar (lake or pool). Only one was completed, which can be seen while walking to Darbar Sahib. Three others were planned on each end of the sarovar, but were not constructed due to the death of Maharaja Nau Nihal Singh. Additionally, both the First (1845–1846) and Second Anglo-Sikh Wars (1848–1849) against the British prevented further progress.

=== British period (1849–1947) ===
In 1877, Bhai Harsa Singh, a granthi of Darbar Sahib, Tarn Taran, was the first teacher, of the Singh Sabha movement, which came into existence in 1873, to bring reformation among Sikh masses and certain practices that had entered Sikhs and restore it to its former glory. To remove Hindu Rituals which had entered Sikh way of life since Maharaja Ranjit Singh time, such as pilgrimage to Haridwar and Bedian de phere (Hindu ceremonial wedding according to Vedas). Although some practices related to Hindu culture still continued well into the early 20th century.

In 1883, Raja Raghubir Singh Sidhu (1832–1887), the Sikh Raja of Jind Princely State, had a channel dug, from the sarovar, to bring in new water, to keep the tank beautified. The channel was later paved by Sant Gurmukh Singh (1849–1947), of Patiala from 1927 to 1928. During 1923–28, the Sarovar at Tarn Taran was desilted and lined.

Sardar Arur Singh Shergill (1865–1926), who was descended from the lineage of Chaudhri Sarvani Shergill who had held chaudhriyat of hundreds of villages north of Amritsar during the 1600s and Chaudhri Chuhar Singh of Nashera Nangal near Amritsar, his son Sardar Mirza Singh Shergill who had joined the Kanhaiya Misl in 1752. Arur Singh was made the manager of Tarn Taran Sahib Gurdwara from 1907 to 1920, by the British, to keep the Sikh shrine out of direct Sikh Control. In 1905 an earthquake damaged the Lotus Dome of Darbar Sahib Tarn Taran, but soon after it was rebuilt. The Sikhs of Punjab fought and sacrificed to gain independence from the British rulers. In 1921 greedy priests divided the income of the Gurdwara among themselves. It was in 1921 that the Sikhs decided to free Tarn Taran Sahib. Seventeen Sikhs got injured at Tarn Taran. Two Sikhs attained martyrdom – Sardar Hazara Singh of Village Aladinpur District Amritsar and Sardar Hukam Singh of Village Wasoo Kot District Gurdaspur.

They were the first martyrs of the Gurdwara reform movement. On arrival of more squads on 26 January, the priests handed over the management of the Gurdwara to the Prabhandak Committee. This martyrdom was known as Saka Tarn Taran.

=== Post-independence (1947–present) ===
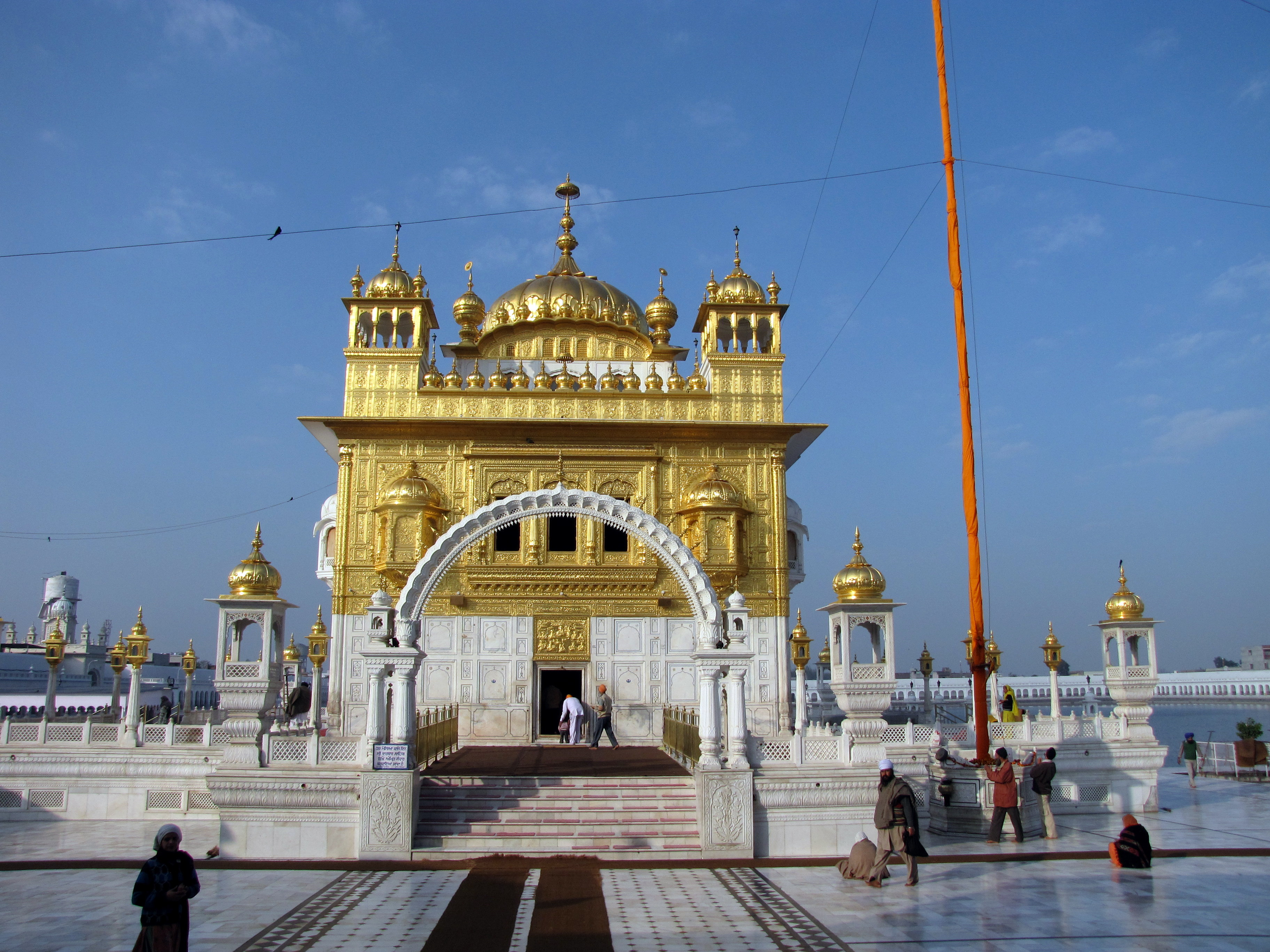
Gurdwara Sri Darbar Sahib, Tarn Taran, 2008

Since the partition of 1947, more work (kar Seva) has been done on Darbar Sahib Tarn Taran. The first work was in 1970, when the Old Bungas Towers of Sikh chieftains were demolished to construct a big complex. In all four corners of Darbar Sahib, the Holy Tank (Sarovar) was cleaned by Sikhs. In the early 1980s, a big hall was built to replace many Old Sikh period buildings. In 2005 the whole of Darbar Sahib was renovated. It was plated in new gold, and inside the Darbar Sahib new work was done. New marble was inlaid; a big complex was built; and more buildings were added around the complex.

==== Partial destruction of the Darshani Deori gateway ====
An incident involving a haphazard and destructive renovation under the guise of "kar seva" led to the top section of the historical Darshani Deori (gateway) at the Gurdwara Tarn Taran Sahib complex being destroyed in March 2019. This sparked criticism of the lack of care for preserving the historical structure from Sikh organizations. The Kar Seva leader responsible for the demolish, Jagtar Singh, was evicted from the premises as a result from the outcry of Sikhs at the destruction of their heritage.

== Gallery ==
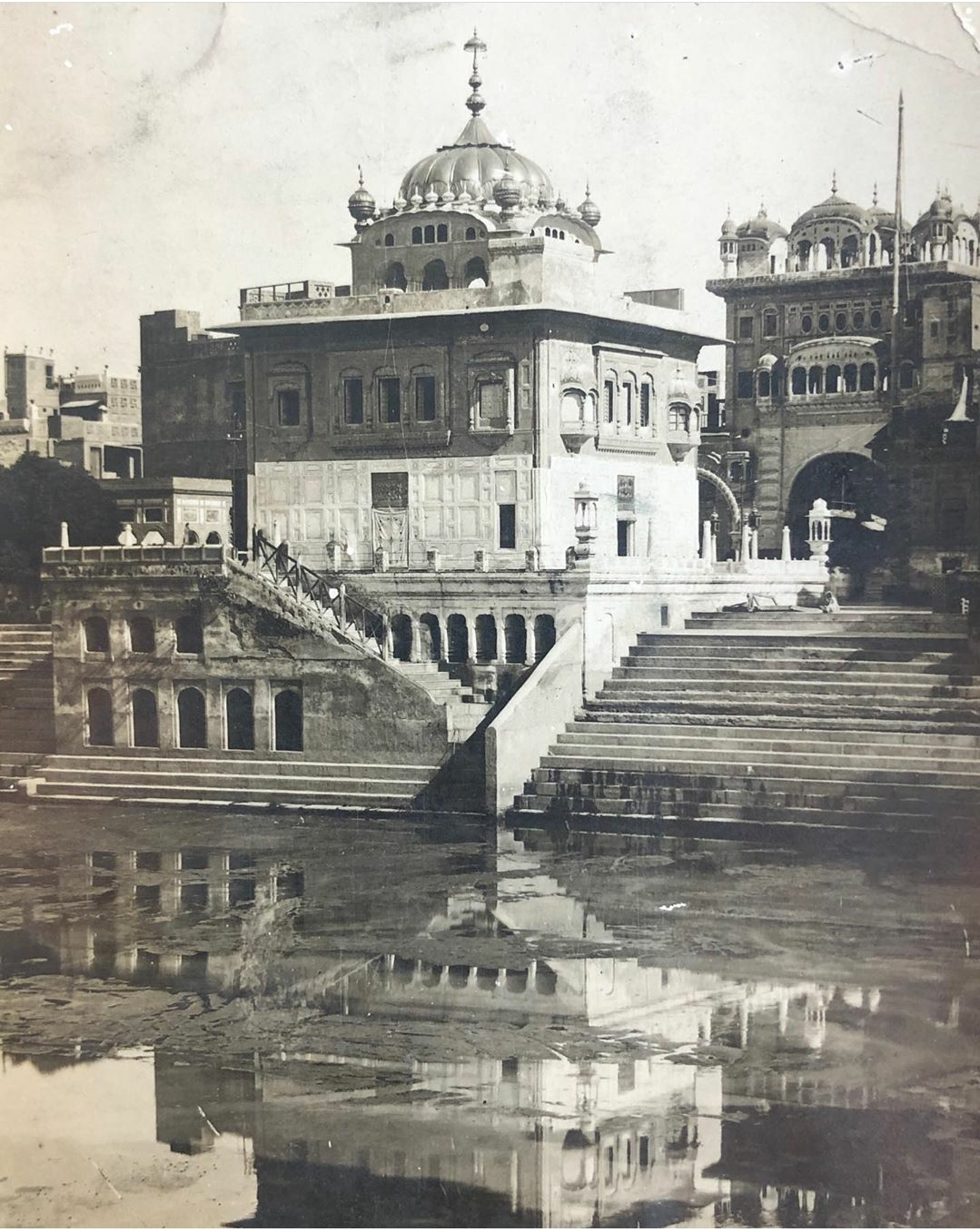
Photograph of Gurdwara Sri Tarn Taran Sahib, circa 1890

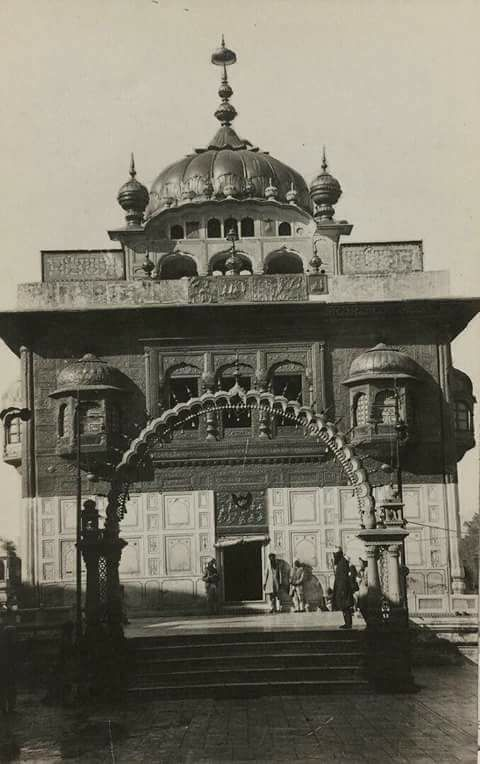
Photograph of Gurdwara Sri Tarn Tarn Sahib, circa 1940's

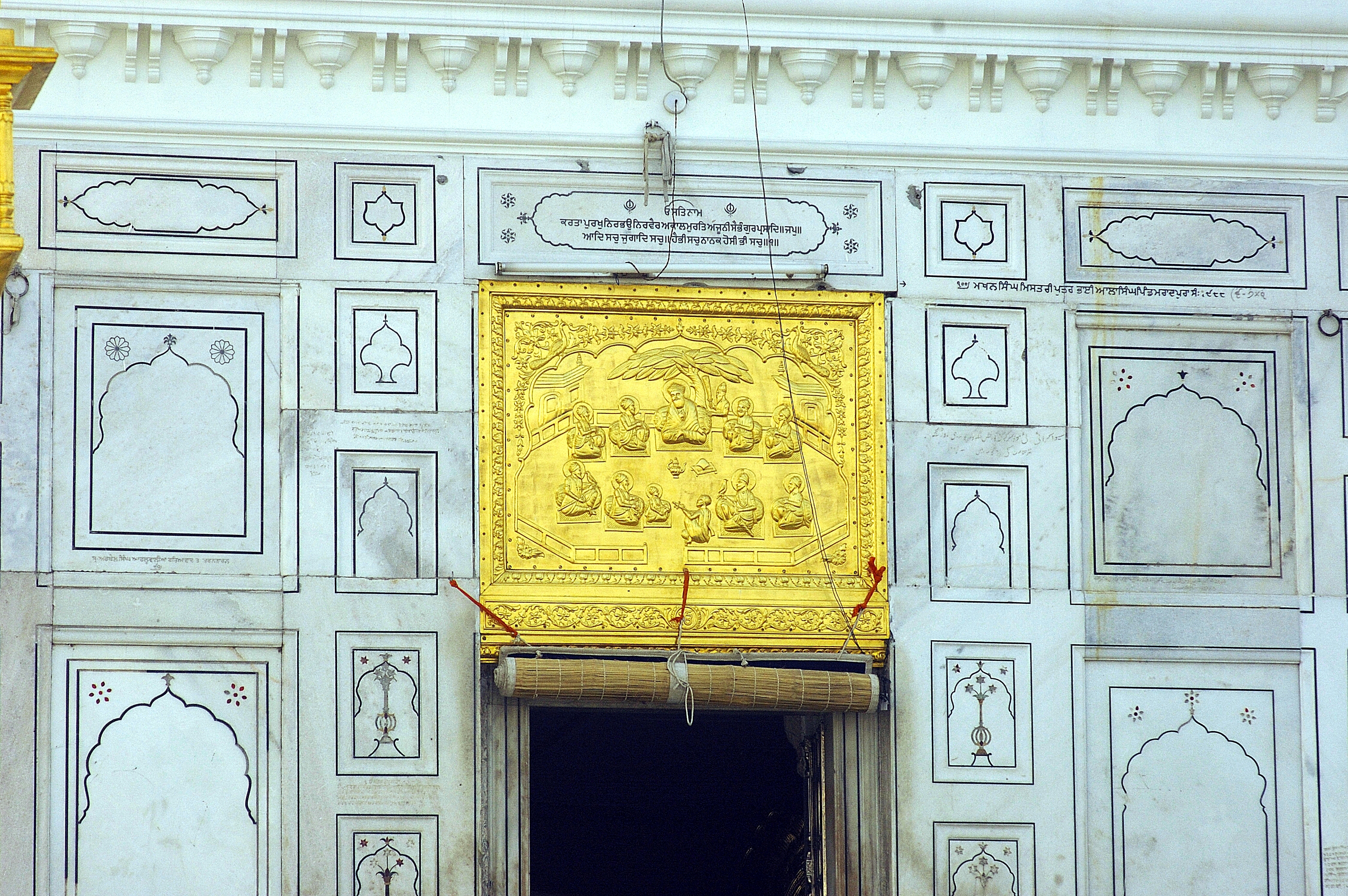
Details of an entrance at Gurudwara Tarn Taran Sahib

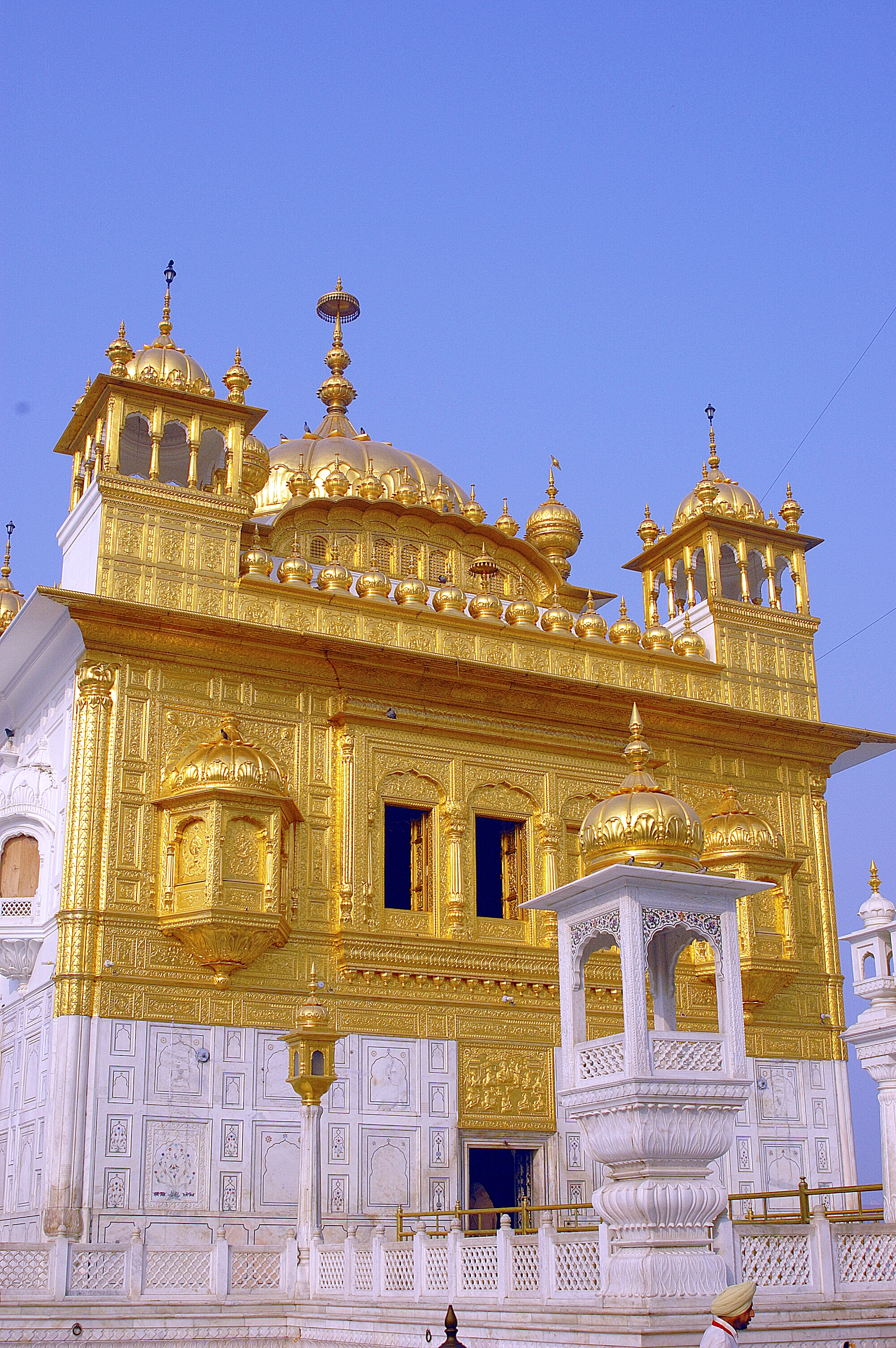
Gurudwara Sri Tarn Taran Sahib, Punjab, India.

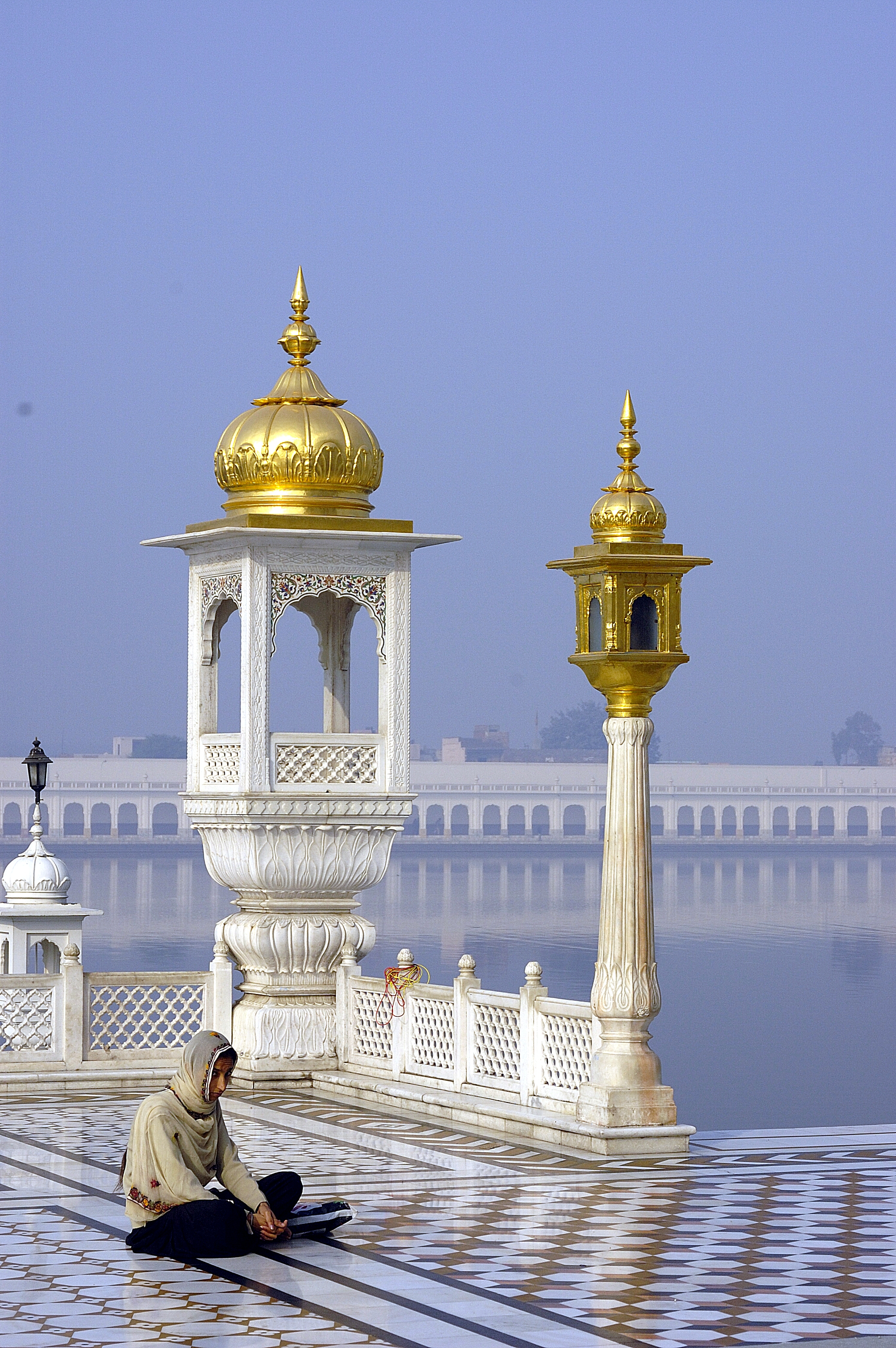
A Sikh devotee by the sarovar at Gurdwara Tarn Taran Sahib.

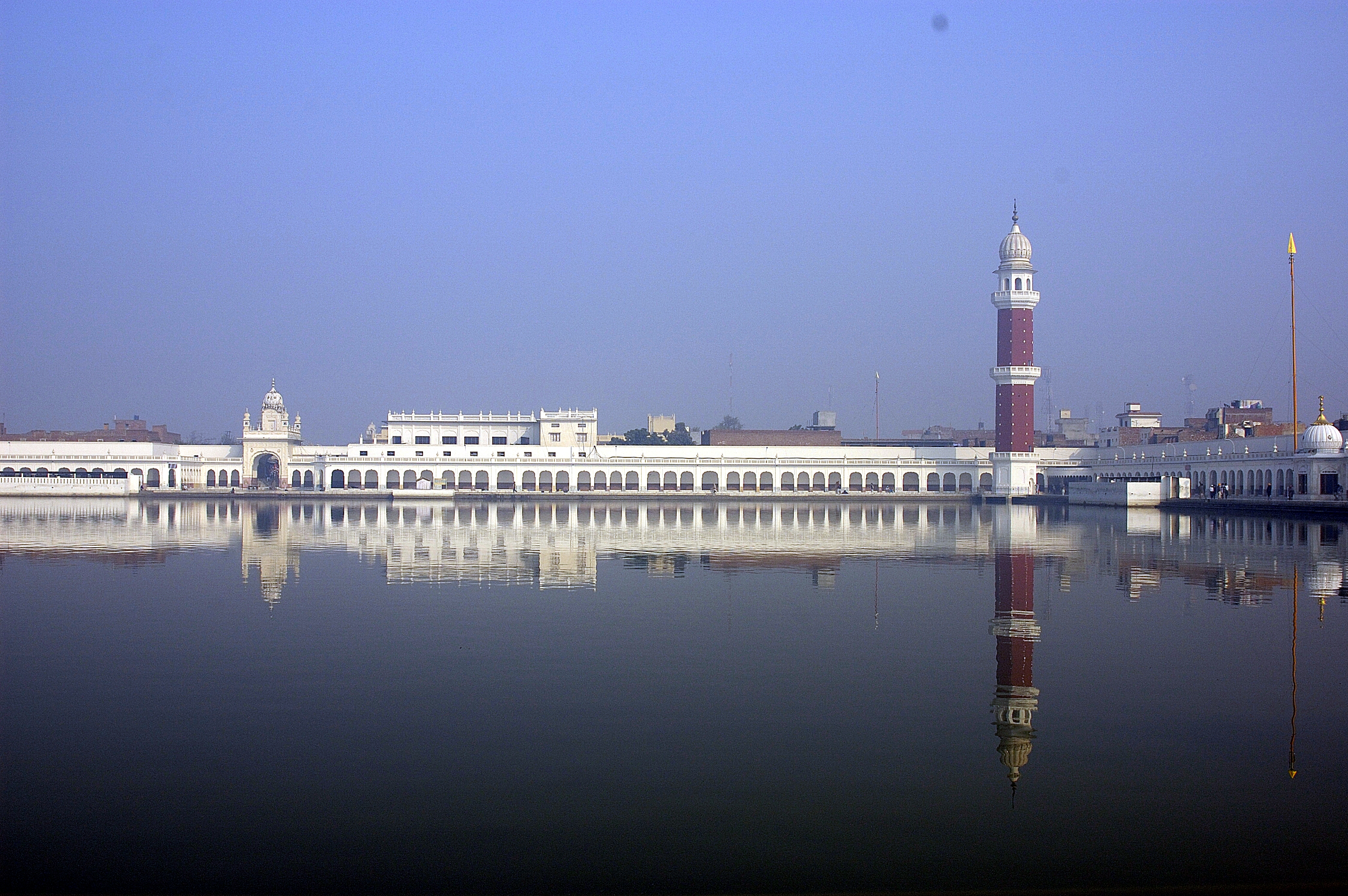
Sarovar at Gurudwara Tarn Taran Sahib

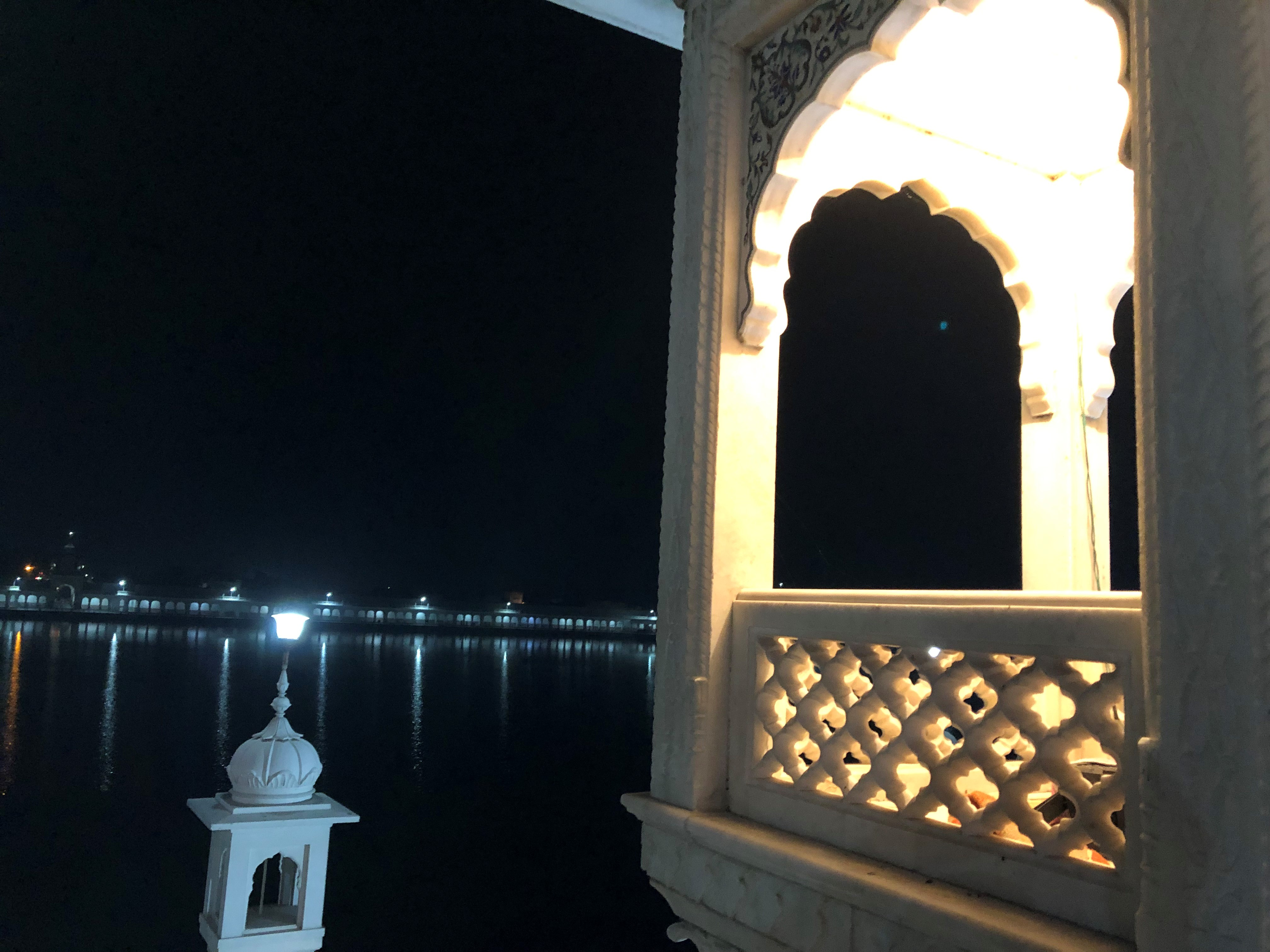
Tarn Taran Sahib at night: one of the largest sarovar (sacred pool)
