= Sarhali, Tarn Taran =

Sarhali
- Town
- Location in Punjab, India Sarhali (India)
- Coordinates: 31°16′42″N 74°56′29″E
- Country: India
- State: Punjab
- District: Tarn Taran

Government
  - Sarpanch: Sardar Amolakjeet Singh

Area
  - Total: 30.23 km^{2} (11.67 sq mi)
- Elevation: 218 m (715 ft)

Population (2011)
  - Total: 13,295
  - Density: 439.8/km^{2} (1,139/sq mi)

Languages
  - Official: Punjabi
- Time zone: UTC+5:30 (IST)
- PIN: 143-410
- Telephone code: 91 1852
- Vehicle registration: PB46
- Website: www.tarntarancity.com

Sarhali is a town and a municipal council in Patti subdivision of Tarn Taran district in the Indian state of Punjab.

== Education ==
Guru Gobind Singh Khalsa College in Sarhali, affiliated to the Guru Nanak Dev University, Amritsar, was established in 1970.

== Notable people ==
- Baba Gurdit Singh
- Praveen Kumar Sobti - athlete, film actor, politician, and soldier
