= Tarn Taran Sahib =

City in Punjab, India

Tarn Taran Sahib Taran Tāran Sāhib (Punjabi)
- City
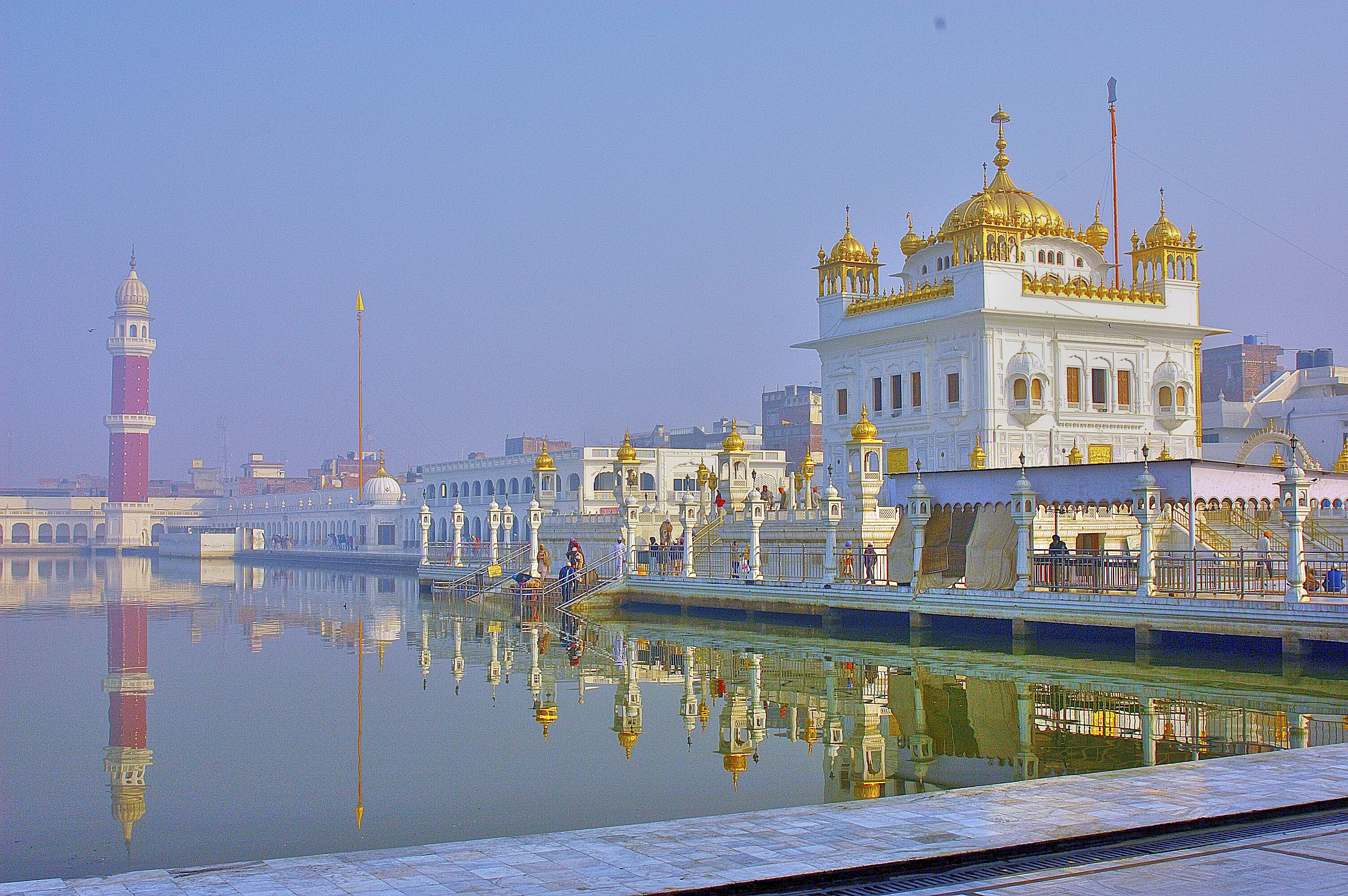
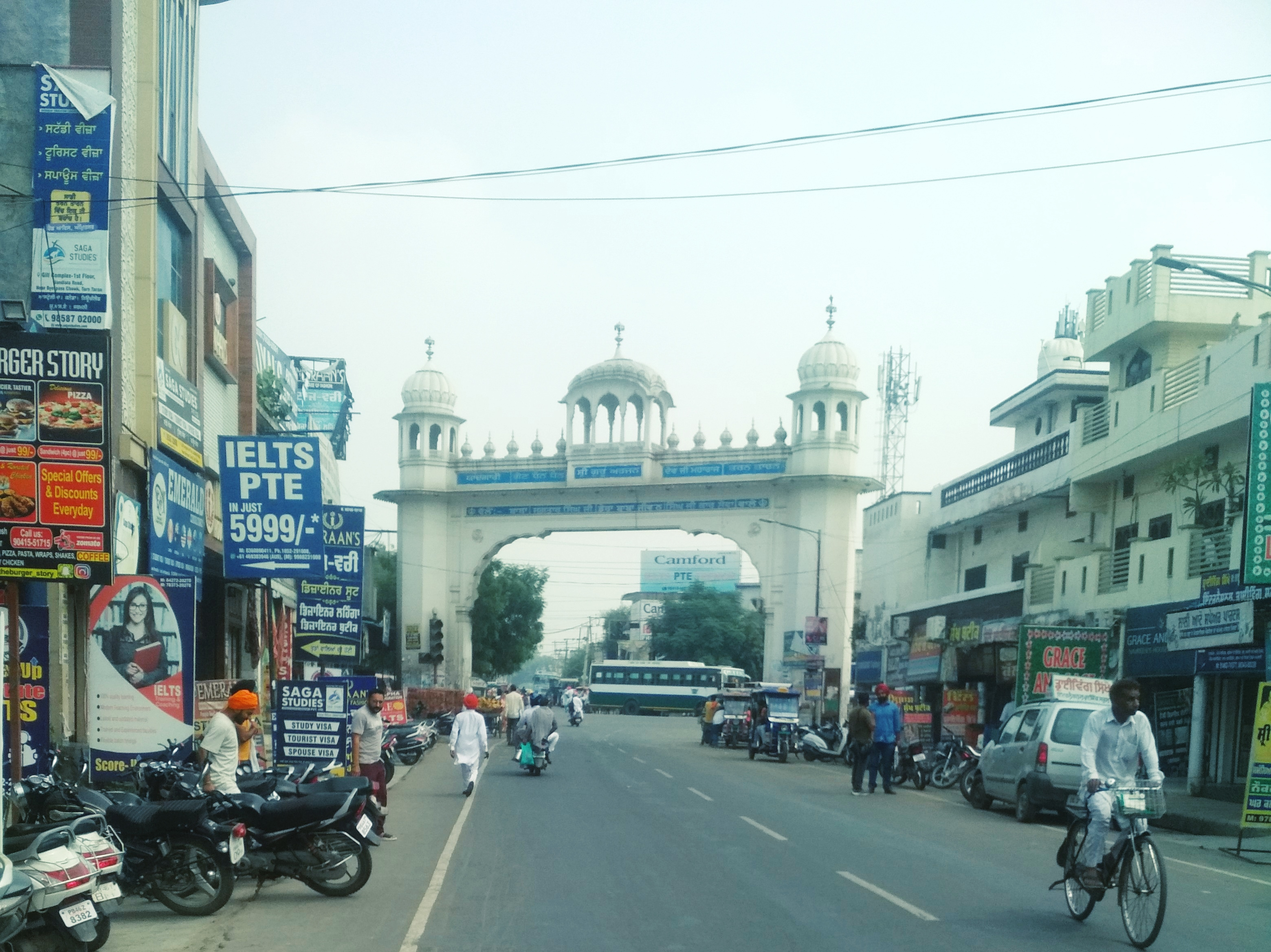
- clockwise from top: Gurdwara Tarn Taran Sahib, Sri Guru Arjan Dev Ji Gate.

- Location in Punjab, India
- Coordinates: 31°27′19.33″N 74°55′32.841″E
- Country: India
- State: Punjab
- District: Tarn Taran
- Established: 1500 CE
- Founder: Guru Arjan Dev Ji

Area
  - Total: 70 km^{2} (27 sq mi)
- Elevation: 500.5 m (1,642 ft)

Population (2011)
  - Total: 130,587
- Demonym: Tarn Tarn Sahib Wale

Languages
  - Official: Punjabi
- Time zone: UTC+5:30 (IST)
- PIN: 143401
- Telephone code: +91 (225) 1852
- Vehicle registration: PB-46
- Sex ratio: 764 ♂/♀
- Website: www.darbarsahibtarntarn.com

Tarn Taran Sahib is a city in the Majha region of the state of Punjab, India. It is the district headquarters and hosts the municipal council of Tarn Taran district. Gurdwara Sri Tarn Taran Sahib, a prominent Sikh shrine, is located in the central part of the city.

== History ==
Tarn Taran Sahib dates back to the times of the fifth sikh Guru Shri Guru Arjan Dev Ji (1563-1606). He laid the foundation of this city in 1596 and the milestone was laid for the welfare of people with the establishment of Shri Tarn Taran Sahib Temple. Tarn Taran Sahib was part of the Bhangi Misl ruled by a powerful Sikh family of Dhillon clan from 1716 to 1810. In 1947, the year of the partition of Indian and the partition of Punjab, Tarn Taran was the only tehsil in Punjab along with Shiekhpura, Ludhiana, Jalandhar, Hoshiarpur, Kapurthala, Amritsar, Lyallpur, Patiala with a majority Sikh population. The city was a center of the Sikh insurgency during the 1980s and early 1990s.

Guru Sahib created the city for the welfare of people. He was the first to initiate the noble cause of curing the leprosy patients. It was later strengthened by the setup of leprosy home by Church Missionary society in 1885.

The city is the center of Sikh culture and has many historical Gurudwaras. The Majha belt is considered a historic Sikh center of gathering and interest. The city has many historical Gurudwaras which include Darbar Sahib Sri Guru Arjan Dev Ji, Gurudwara Guru ka Khuh (Gurudwara of the Guru's Well), Gurdwara Bibi Bhani Da Khuh, Gurudwara Takkar Sahib, Guruwara Lakeer Sahib, Gurudwara Baba Garja Singh Baba Bota Singh, Gurudwara Jhulne Mahal, and Thatti Khara.

=== Gurdwara Reform Movement ===
As the Gurdwara reform movement got under way, the control of the sacred shrines passed to a representative body of the Sikhs, the Shiromani Gurdwara Parbandhak Committee, on 27 January 1921. A leper asylum established by Guru Arjan Dev was ignored by the clergy after the abrogation of Sikh sovereignty, and taken over in 1858 by Christian missionaries.

== Demographics ==
As of 2001 Indian census, the city had a population of 130,587 with males constituting 51% of the population and females 49%. Tarn Taran has an average literacy rates of 70%, higher than the national average of 59.5%; male literacy is 60%, whereas female literacy is 40%. In Tarn Taran Sahib, 12% of the population is under 6 years of age while 15% is elderly population. Around 3% of the city's residents have settled abroad.

=== Religion ===
Sikhs form 89.1% of the total population of the district with Hindus being 9.8% and Christians 1.1% of the total population. Tarn Taran district has the highest Sikh percentage among all the districts of Punjab followed by Moga at 87%.

== Politics ==
The city is part of the Tarn Taran Assembly Constituency.

== Economy ==
=== Industry ===
Tarn Taran Sahib is the site of the Goindwal Sahib Power Plant and harike barrage. The main occupation in this area is agriculture and agro-industry with very few other industries.

== Government and politics ==
Tarn Taran Assembly Constituency is part of Khadoor Sahib parliamentary constituency, located in Tarn Taran district of the state of Punjab. In Vidhansabha elections of 2022, Dr. Kashmir Singh Sohal of AAP Party won with 52,935 votes. The runner-up was Harmeet Singh Sandhu of Shiromani Akali Dal party. The margin of victory was 13,588 votes.

In Vidhansabha elections 2017, Dr. Dharambir Agnihotri of Indian National Congress party won with 59,794 votes. The runner-up was Harmeet Singh Sandhu of Shiromani Akali Dal party. The margin of victory was 14,629 votes.

== Notable people ==
- Baba Deep Singh, Sikh leader
- Jaswant Singh Khalra, Sikh Human rights activist
- Baba Gurdit Singh, of the SS Komagata Maru incident
- Bhai Bidhi Chand Chhina, soldier
- Bhai Maha Singh, Sikh leader
- Dara Singh Dulachipur, wrestler
- Deepak Dhawan communist leader
- Gurdial Singh Dhillon, politician
- Gurpreet Singh (shooter)
- M. S. Gill, politician
- Mai Bhago, soldier
- Pratap Singh Kairon, politician
- Krishan Kant, politician
- Surender Mohan Pathak, novelist
- Teja Singh Samundri, temple administrator
- Sardar Baghel Singh Karora Singhia, who occupied Delhi
- Sohan Singh Bhakna, politician
- Gurbaksh Chahal, businessman
- Prem Dhillon, singer
- Paintal, actor
- Talwiinder, singer
