= Attempted assassination of Julio Ribeiro =

1986 shooting in Jalandhar, India

- Part of Insurgency in Punjab
- Location: Punjab Armored Police Headquarters, Jalandhar, India
- Date: 3 October 1986; 40 years ago 6:45 a.m.
- Target: Julio Ribeiro (police officer)
- Attack type: Shooting
- Weapons: Carbines, machine guns
- Deaths: 2 officers killed
- Injuries: 4 officers, Julio Ribeiro
- Perpetrator: Khalistan Commando Force

On 3 October 1986, militants from the Khalistan Commando Force, led by Labh Singh, made an attempt on the life of Director General of Police in Punjab, India, Julio Ribeiro in Jalandhar within the Punjab Armored Police headquarters. Ribeiro was wounded in the attack along with his wife. Ribeiro's wounds were minor, but his wife was hospitalized. 2 officers were killed and 2 were seriously wounded in the attack. All the attackers escaped unhurt.

== Background ==
The insurgency in Punjab, India began with Operation Blue Star which saw a military attack on the Golden Temple and numerous other Gurdwaras. The aim of the Operation was to flush out Sikh militants from Gurdwaras, but it caused great damage to the Golden Temple and, according to independent estimates, 5,000 civilians were killed in the operation. The Operation was viewed by a large amount of Sikhs as an attack on the faith some of whom became kharkus (militant insurgents) and joined the Khalistan movement and began an insurgency. Ribeiro was made the chief of Punjab Police in late 1985 to bring an end to the insurgency. He was created with making the "bullet for bullet" policy to combat Kharkus in reaction to Labh Singh's breaking out of prison.

In early 1986 Khalistan Commando Force was founded by the Sarbat Khalsa and Panthic Committee. It was the "official" army of the Khalistan movement. Manbir Singh Chaheru was made the leader in February 1986. After his disappearance in police custody Labh Singh took over. The earlies goal of KCF was the killing of Ribeiro.

=== Planning ===
According to Harjinder Singh Jinda he and fellow members of KCF had always aspired to assassinate Ribeiro, but planning for such did not begin until Labh Singh took over KCF in August 1986. Wassam Singh and Dhanna Singh of the Panthic Committee were key members in the planning of the assassination. Labh Singh was said to be the mastermind. Multiple officers working at Punjab Armored Police headquarters in Jalandhar had joined KCF and began plotting with Labh Singh on how to kill Ribeiro. Gurcharan Singh, Constable Sardul Singh, Constable Balwinder Singh, Constable Dalwinder Singh, Constable Kewal Singh, Head Constable Ajit Singh, and Head Constable Kulwant Singh of the Punjab Police along with Labh Singh offered an ardas on 15 September for their goal of killing Ribeiro in revenge for Ribeiro's role in fake encounters which targeted Sikh youth. The kharkus would usually meet at Ajit Singh's home planning escape routes and details of the attack. Balwinder Singh acquired the weapons for the attack a few days before.

== Attack ==
On 3 October 1986, 6 militant attacked Ribeiro as he walked in the Punjab Armored Police's headquarters' garden along with wife. At 6:45 am Dalwinder Singh, Balwinder Singh, Sardul Singh and Ajit Singh armed with Carbines and Dhanna Singh, with a machine gun, drove to the gate of the headquarters in a police jeep, numbering 471 PAT, driven by Vijaypal Singh. All were in police uniform. One of them exited the jeep and asked an officer for their weapon to inspect it. Upon getting it he and 3 other Kharkus scaled a mound and opened fire on Ribeiro who ducked in cover. They further shot dead a sentry and injured another one. Over 50 rounds were fired. While fleeing they killed another officer and wounded one more. The Kharkus abandoned the jeep near the headquarters and fled in a truck. No officer fired a shot in return or attempted to chase the Kharkus. In the attack 2 officers were killed. Ribeiro escaped wounded, and his wife was hospitalized. 4 other officers were wounded.

== Aftermath ==
The attack led to criticism on Punjab Police's readiness. Chief Minister of Punjab Surjit Singh Barnala said, 'The complex should have been the best protected place in Punjab. There has been a definite, serious security lapse. The guards were not trained, they were not cautious. Somebody inside knew the entire set-up. The terrorists knew which side they should go, even the passage through the barbed wire. Since our increased onslaught on the terrorists, they have been eager for actions that will give them publicity mileage."
