= Gurdeep Singh Deepa =

Indian Sikh militant (1970–1992)

- Born: c. 1970; Heran, Punjab, India
- Died: 12 December 1992 (aged 21–22); Garha, Punjab, India
- Cause of death: Suicide
- Years active: 1984-1992
- Organization(s): All India Sikh Student Federation; Khalistan Commando Force

Gurdeep Singh Deepa, (c. 1970 – 12 December 1992) was Sikh militant. He was the deputy chief of the Khalistan Commando Force (Panjwar faction) and served as the Jalandhar area commander during the insurgency in Punjab, India.

== Militancy ==
=== Beginning ===
Deepa started associating with militants after Operation Blue Star. Deepa began to associate with militant factions of All India Sikh Student Federation and in accordance with them began to boycott the 1985 Punjab Legislative Assembly election.

=== Arrest ===
Soon after Deepa was arrested after a man named Ram Ratan gave the police a tip. Deepa was charged under Arms Acts Sections 25, 54, 59.

=== Khalistan Commando Force ===
Deepa joined Khalistan Commando Force (KCF) in 1987 and eventually become the area commander of Jalandhar and deputy chief of KCF.

=== Killing of Gurdial Singh and Deepak Dhawan ===
In 1987 Deepa and other KCF members on motorcycles shot dead Communist Party of India (Marxist) member, and district president Gurdial Singh.

On 19 May 1987, Deepa and other KCF members under Labh Singh killed Deepak Dhawan who was a State Committee member of the Communist Party of India (Marxist). Dhawan was riding his scooter near Sanghe. KCF members approached him and told him to try and run. He tried to run, but they shot him as he tried.

=== Killing Pash ===
On 23 March 1988, poet Pash, whose real name was Avtar Singh Sandhu, was killed by Gurdeep Singh Deepa. Pash wrote in support of communism and was a vocal critic of Jarnail Singh Bhindranwale.

=== Killing of police cats ===
On 11 September 1989, Deepa and other KCF members killed 3 "police cats" (police cats were militants turned police who became police informants within the militants).

=== Killing of Sohan Singh Dhesi ===
On 18 September 1989, Deepa and other KCF members assassinated Sohan Singh Dhesi. Dhesi was the general secretary of the Shaheed Bhagat Singh Naujawan Sabha. He was also the State Secretary of the Democratic Youth Federation of India.

=== Killing of Varinder Kumar Gagan ===
On 8 June 1991, Deepa and other KCF members killed Communist Party of India (Marxist) candidate Varinder Kumar Gagan in Nakodar. He was killed with 2 of his gunmen and 1 party worker.

=== Killing of Sarwan Singh Cheema ===
On 4 November 1991, Deepa killed Sarwan Singh Cheema the secretary of the Communist Party of India (Marxist) and a former MLA. He was gunned down along with security guards Santokh Singh, Ram Lubhaya, Raghubir Chand, Mohindar Singh and head constable Paramjit Singh of Punjab Police.

=== Attack on Murli Manohar Joshi's caravan ===
On 23 January 1992, Deepa attacked BJP President Murli Manohar Joshi's caravan. The caravan was a part of the Ekta Yatra. Part of the caravan was Narendra Modi. The attack happened in Phagwara. As the caravan entered Phagwara the lead bus was attacked by Deepa and another with Ak-47's. They had disguised themselves as police officers. 3 were killed. They were the driver and 2 party workers. 40 others were injured.

=== Killing of Mann Singh ===
On 15 March 1992, Deepa killed SHO (Station House Officer) Mann Singh in Phillaur. Mann had been dubbed a butcher and had been a target of Sikh militants for much time.

=== Killing of Balwant Singh Sarhal ===
On 26 April 1992, Deepa and other KCF members killed Akali Dal MLA Balwant Singh Sarhal. Sarhal was killed along with 3 of his bodyguards.

=== Killing of Darshan Singh Kaypee ===
On 12 October 1992, Deepa killed Darshan Singh Kaypee and his bodyguard, Constable Ashok Kumar, in Jalandhar. According to police 2 KCF members on an Enfield motorcycle rode up beside Kaypee's car. From there they opened fire with an assault rifle. He was a 5 time MLA for the Congress Party (I), former Punjab state minister, and was the vice-president of the Punjab Congress Party.

== Death ==
On 12 December 1992, Deepa was surrounded by police when he was in Garha, at the home of Bhag Singh. The resident tipped the police off about Deepa's location. Deepa would kill himself with a cyainde pill. The police were accused of planting weapons on Deepa to stage a fake encounter.
