= Gurdev Singh Kaunke =

Sikh leader (1949–1993)

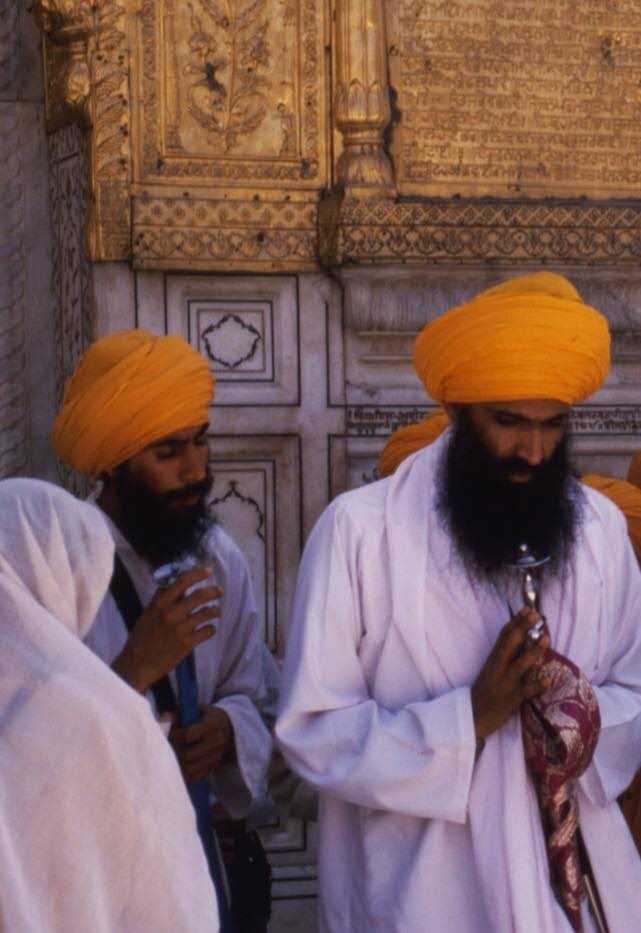

Acting Jathedar of the Akal Takht
- In office 26 January 1986 – 1 January 1993
- Appointed by: Sarbat Khalsa
- Preceded by: Jasbir Singh
- Succeeded by: Gurbachan Singh Manochahal

Personal details
- Born: Gurdev Singh; 1949 Kaunke Kalan, Ludhiana, Punjab, India
- Died: 1 January 1993 (aged 43–44) Chuhar Chak, Moga, Punjab, India
- Spouse: Gurmel Kaur
- Children: 3
- Parents: Gurdial Singh (father); Chand Kaur (mother)
- Education: Damdami Taksal

Gurdev Singh Kaunke (1949 – 1 January 1993) was a Sikh priest who served as the acting Jathedar of the Akal Takht from 1986 to 1993.

== Early life ==
Gurdev Singh was born in 1949 at village Kaunke Kalan under Jagraon subdivision of Ludhiana district in Punjab, India. His father was Gurdial Singh and mother Chand Kaur. Gurdev Singh's grandfather, Jathedar Totha Singh was a companion of Baba Nand Singh of Nanaksar. At a young age, Singh took the vows of the Khalsa and became an initiated Sikh. After completing 6 levels of primary school, he enrolled into Damdami Taksal.

== Jathedar of Akal Takht ==
A Sarbat Khalsa was called at Akal Takht in Amritsar on 26 January 1986. At the gathering, the delegation of Sarbat Khalsa announced Jasbir Singh Rode as the Jathedar of Akal Takht. Rode was imprisoned during his appointment; therefore, the delegation assigned Kaunke to serve as the acting Jathedar of Akal Takht.

On 29 April 1986, the Panthic Committee held a press conference at Harmandir Sahib and declared an independent Punjabi Sikh homeland, Khalistan. Straight after the declaration, all members of the Panthic Committee escaped the scene. Subsequently, the police and army surrounded the premises and arrested Jathedar Kaunke, being the only person of significance at the complex.

Whilst Gurdev Singh Kaunke was imprisoned, Gurbachan Singh Manochahal and later Professor Darshan Singh served as the acting Jathedar of Akal Takht.

He would be released after. Kaunke spent much time being illegally and officially arrested and released.

== Personal life ==
In 1970, Singh married Gurmel Kaur through the Anand Karaj ceremony. The couple had seven children.

== Tortured to Death ==
Gurdev Singh Kaunke was arrested by a group of police officers led by Inspector Gurmit Singh on 25 December 1992, from his home in Kaunke Kalan. On 28 December, Jathedar Kaunke's wife, Gurmail Kaur found out that he had been moved from Sadar Police Station Jagraon to the Criminal Investigation Agency (CIA) interrogation center at Jagraon. When Kaunke's wife brought food to the interrogation center, the police officer told her that Gurdev Singh Kaunke was in no shape to eat anything due to torture. This fact was also confirmed by a youth who was released on 30 December and a doctor who had seen him in custody.

On 31 December, Gurmail Kaur was informed that Gurdev Singh Kaunke was taken away from the CIA interrogation center. After that, Jathedar Kaunke's whereabouts could not be discovered. The police authorities claimed that Kaunke escaped from custody of 2 January 1993, after breaking a chain restraining him.

In May 1997, the Committee for Coordination of Disappearances in Punjab (CCDP) investigated the enforced disappearance of Gurdev Singh Kaunke. The CCDP acquired conclusive evidence to show that Kaunke was inhumanly tortured first at Sadar police station of Jagraon and then at the CIA interrogation center of Jagraon from 25 December 1992 to 1 January 1993. The Committee also acquired irrefutable evidence to establish that the former Jathedar of Akal Takht was killed under torture.

== Police Accounts ==
The Committee for Coordination of Disappearances in Punjab (CCDP) led by Ram Naryan Kumar uncovered the mysterious disappearance of Gurdev Singh Kaunke through the deposition of two police officers who had personal knowledge of the incident. The first deposition was given by Darshan Singh who had been invited by Senior Superintendent of Police (SSP) Swaran Ghotna of Jagraon to join the police in May 1992. The other deposition was given by a serving SSP of the Punjab Police who was an eyewitness of the torture and death of Gurdev Singh Kaunke.
