= Manvir Singh =

Manvir Singh may refer to:

- Manvir Singh (footballer, born 2001)
- Manvir Singh (footballer, born 1995)
- Manbir Singh Chaheru (1959–1987), founder and first leader of the organization Khalistan Commando Force
