= Sukhwinder Singh Sangha =

Sikh militant in India (1965–1990)

1st Jathedar of Bhindranwale Tiger Force of Khalistan (S)
- Preceded by: None
- Succeeded by: Racchpal Singh Chandra

Personal details
- Born: 2 February 1965 Sangha, Punjab, India
- Died: 3 November 1990 (aged 25) Bhullar, Tarn Taran, Punjab, India
- Education: Sri Guru Arjan Dev College
- Nickname: Sangha

Military service
- Allegiance: Bhindranwale Tiger Force of Khalistan, Panthic Committee
- Years of service: 1982–1990
- Rank: General; Jathedar

Sukhwinder Singh Sangha (3 February 1965 - 3 November 1990) was a Sikh militant (kharku), the head of a faction of Bhindranwale Tiger Force of Khalistan during the insurgency in Punjab, India.

Sangha was a popular Kharku, known for his help of civilians. He was awarded the title of the "20th-century Hari Singh Nalwa" by Damdami Taksal and other Sikh organizations (jathas).

== Early life ==
Sukhwinder Singh Sangha was born on 3 February 1965, to Gulzar Singh and Mahinder Kaur in the village Sangha near Tarn Taran. He was the eldest of 5 siblings. Sangha was born in a farming family and became a farmer at a young age. Sangha took Amrit at a young age. Sangha received a Bachelor of Fine Arts at Sri Guru Arjan Dev College.

Sangha began listening to Jarnail Singh Bhindranwale's speeches and sermons and soon after joined Amrik Singh's All India Sikh Student Federation. During Dharam Yudh Morcha Sangha courted arrest in protest. Sangha was kept in Ludhiana prison. He was released, but arrested once more after Operation Blue Star, and released again.

== Early actions ==
Sukhwinder Singh Sangha began his militancy after his second prison release. He took part in multiple militant gatherings and associated himself with Ranjit Singh Rana Thru and did multiple militant activities in the Majha area. Thru, Sangha, and a group of around other 15 Kharkus were involved in the robbing of a Home Guard and Railway Police armory on 16 February 1986. They took 16 rifles and 440 cartridges of ammunitions. Thru, and Sangha were also involved in killings of looters in Majha.

== Bhindranwale Tiger Force of Khalistan ==
On 25 August 1987, Rana Thru was killed in a police encounter, leaving Sangha alone. Sangha soon met Gurbachan Singh Manochahal, the head of Bhindranwale Tiger Force of Khalistan. Sangha joined BTFK and became its Lieutenant General. Sangha led the day-to-day operations of BTFK and led 50-80 Kharkus. Around this time Sangha made a statement in the press appealing for Kharkus to not be involved in "personal problems", to not harass "innocents", and to use weapons against "tyrants" and not to "cause terrorism". Sangha also appealed for people to see Kharkus as "brothers" and not "terrorists". Sangha also reveled that his father had been murdered and said he did not join the movement to kill "personnel enemies" and said he would not do anything until "evidence has been revealed".

On 26 January 1988, Sangha claimed responsibility for killing eight Black Cats. Sangha alleged in a press note that the eight had sent letters in his name attempting to extort people. Sangha said that they were killed as they went to take 500,000 rupees from a family they had sent extortion letters to.

On 29 May 1988, Sukhwinder Singh Sangha claimed responsibility for killing 4 and injuring 4 on 28 May 1988, in Hoshiarpur for celebrating Operation Black Thunder. Sangha also claimed responsibility for killing 1 Nirankari in Phagwara, and claimed responsibility for killing 3 and injuring 2 people in 2 separate incidents for alleged blasphemy and anti-Sikh acts.

On 22 October 1988, Sukhwinder Singh Sangha was surrounded by police in Turr while eating at a home of a pro-Kharku family. The police opened unprovoked fire on Sangha and the residents of the home and Sangha responded killing 3 officers and fleeing with the pro-Kharku family in order to ensure their protection.

Sangha claimed responsibility for killing 2 Homeguards in Dublia on 20 March 1989. Sangha also claimed responsibility for killing 2 soldiers in Lanbhi Bhai and 1 soldier in Samadhur. Sangha also claimed responsibility for killing police informants in Herna Thava.

On 8 April 1989, Sukhwinder Singh Sangha claimed responsibility for killing 6 police informants of one family in Jaspal. One of the killed had recently been released from Jodhpur Prison after a 5 year sentence.

=== Encounter in Mussa ===
On 24 June 1989, Sukhwinder Singh Sangha was involved in a fierce encounter at Mussa near Tarn Taran. The night before a police informant informed Superintendent of Police (Operations) Avtar Singh Chhetra that Sangha was in the village Mussa. Chettra decided to wait until the morning to surround Mussa believing the Kharkus would manage to slip away in the night. Chhetra surrounded Mussa with a combined force of Punjab Police, Central Reserve Police Force and CRPF Commandos. Chhetra led the operation with CRPF head of Punjab Deputy Inspector General Sarbdeep Singh Virk and Punjab Police head of Tarn Taran district Senior Superintendent of Police Baldev Singh. Sangha was in Mussa along with Racchpal Singh Ghuk, Kulwant Singh Kanta, Balwant Singh Brahpuri, Manjinder Singh, and Kulwant Singh Kakka in a home. According to a later press note from Sangha there were 10,000 security forces that had surrounded Mussa.

Chhetra called for the Kharkus to surrender, but the Kharkus did not surrender. As the CRPF and Police force moved towards the Kharkus, Sangha and the others opened fire. Sangha and the militants moved to more defensive positions. After some time of fighting between the Kharkus and Security Forces Sangha and the others once more changed their position and killed Chhetra near his jeep. The encounter continued for 10 hours and ended at 6:30 after DIG Virk and SSP Baldev Singh brought reinforcements. Initially it was reported by police that Sangha had died in the encounter, but Sangha latter came out and said to the press that he managed to survive the encounter.

Initially when it was reported Sangha was killed Gurdwaras across Punjab held Akhand Paths for Sangha to be alive. Sangha said in his statement that, "Daas (Slave, a term used in humility) is in Chardi Kala." Sangha said he escaped during the encounter.

=== Attack on CRPF ===
On 28 December 1989, Sukhwinder Singh Sangha and fellow Kharkus attacked a CRPF outposts in front of Harimander Sahib (Golden Temple). Sangha and the Kharkus surrounded the outpost and opened fire. In 2 minutes Sangha and the Kharkus had killed all 4 CRPF soldiers present. They took their weapons and equipment. The CRPF had been accused of forcibly searching and harassing Sikhs heading to Harimander Sahib.

On 6 February 1990, Sangha set up a checkpoint near Jagatpura (near Ropar/Rupnagar) and engaged in an encounter with two police officers who arrived at the checkpoint. The police arrived at the checkpoint on motorcycle and opened fire then began to flee. The 2 officers were killed while fleeing. Sangha added in a statement that police officers should abandon their job or risk facing a similar fate.

=== Separation with Manochahal ===
In February 1990 Sangha left Manochahal's BTFK and formed his own faction with most of the Kharkus previously under his command. Sangha first associated himself with Khalistan Commando Force of Wasssan Singh Zaffarwal, but later in October 1990 joined the Sohan Sigh Panthic Committee consisting of Khalistan Liberation Force, Khalistan Commando Force (Panjwar), Babbar Khalsa International, and Sikh Student Federation (Bittu). To fund his newly created group Sangha mortgaged his land for 60,000 rupees. He is said to have spent the money to buy better equipment and guns for his men.

==== Post separation ====
According to police Sangha was involved in encounter in Tarn Taran, Malmohri, and Pandori Gola in this time period. Sangha managed to make it out of all these encounters alive and in Pandori Gola escaped by assistance from his Deputy who threw bombs at the security forces that had surrounded the village.

On 16 February 1990, Sangha's BTFK, KCF, BKI, and SSF collectively claimed responsibility for an explosion in Phillaur that killed Inspector Harcharan Singh Soori and Assistant Sub-Inspector Ram Moorti on the 11th. The bomb also wounded two Sergeants. The explosion happened in an armoured and guarded police training facility. Soori and Moorti were put in a special armoured room for extra safety, but were killed at 9 pm from an explosion within their room. Both officers had been accused of torturing Sikhs. Inspector Soori had survived a previous assassination attempt in 1988. Both officers were involved in the killing of the Kharku Mathra Singh in 1988.

On 6 April 1990, Sukhwinder Singh Sangha claimed responsibility for killing five BSF soldiers near Hoshiarpur. On 20 April Sangha claimed responsibility for killing Communist leader Hardev Singh. Hardev had been lured and then kidnapped by Sangha’s men acting as reporters. He was decapitated and his head was hung on a community gate as a warning to communists who opposed the Insurgency. Sangha also issued a warning to those who loot innocents and do extortions. On 27 April Sangha claimed responsibility for the Sarpanch of Bibi Pur, Ram Lal. Sangha said that he had joined Congress and for that was killed.

On 25 May 1990, Sangha claimed responsibility for killing Communist leader Kartar Chand near Nurpur Thana. Sangha also claimed responsibility for killing a soldier named Bhag Singh in Uaid. Sangha stated Bhag Singh was a rapists and thus killed as punishment.

On 29 June 1990, Sukhwinder Singh Sangha was involved in a 2 hour encounter in Gill Varech in Amristar district. Sangha survived the encounter injured and killed several officers. An associate of Sangha died in the encounter.

On 31 August 1990, Sangha claimed responsibility for killing a police constable. He also claimed responsibility for destroying BSF jeeps and killing BSF near Nakodar and for killing a looter.

== Death ==
On 3 November 1990 Sukhwinder Singh Sangha died in a fierce encounter with police. Punjab Police, CRPF, and other security forces under the leadership of Superintendent of Police (Operations) Harjit Singh received a tip off from an informant that Sangha was in the village Bhullar. Harjit led a large security force, according to statement by militants the force numbered 20,000, and by 4am had completely surrounded Bhullar. Sangha was in the village with Bikramjit Singh Narla, Baljit Singh Khela, Manjit Singh Madho, and Rameshpal Singh Patiala. The Kharkus fought the Security Force and the encounter began early in the morning. After continued fire and the Security Force's inability to move forward, Harjit Singh called for bulletproof vehicles and bulletproof tractors to be used. The Kharkus repulsed multiple advances made by the Security Forces. After a 5 hour "fierce" and "deadly" encunter Sangha and his fellow Kharkus were killed. Their bodies were immediately burned by police. At the time Sangha had a 2,200,000 rupee reward on his head.

=== Aftermath ===
Sangha was succeeded by Racchpal Singh Chandra as head of BTFK. Following Sanogha's death KLF, KCF, BTFK, BKI, and SSF issued a joint statement in praise of Sangha and countered "lies" about Sangha's final encounter. They also issued a warning that within one month Sangha's killer will be killed. The Kharkus were supported by Akali Dal and Simranjit Singh Mann in the call for a state wide bandh in Punjab on 5–6 November. In some area the bandh was extended. The bandh was 'successful' with no bank, school, collage, and government building opened during the bandh.

On 12 November Akhand Paths in memory of Sangha ended and a Shaheedi Samagam (Martyr Gathering) was held for Sangha. Despite roadblocks being set across Punjab thousands of Sikhs arrived. Damdami Taksal, Jathedars, Kharkus, Kar Seva, Akali Dal and other Sikh groups took part. They awarded Sangha with the title of "20th-century Hari Singh Nalwa". Nirmal Singh Chohla, a Kavishir, sang a Vaar in honor of Sangha and later released it as an album.

On 24 November KLF, BKI, KCF, BTFK, and SSF killed SP (Operations) Harjit Singh in a remote controlled bomb explosion in revenge for killing Sangha. Harjit died with 3 of his bodyguards, and 3 others were injured. At around 8:45 am as Harjit headed to his office in Tarn Taran with 2 security vehicles. As Harjit’s vehicle arrived to a rural position Kharkus pressed a button and set off a remote controlled bomb placed on the road. In the explosion Harjit's car went 100 meters away from the sight. The sound of the explosion was heard from 5 kilometers away. The 3 security men including the driver in the vehicle were also killed. One of his security vehicle's also sustained damage and 3 security personnel in it were injured. Following the killing a curfew was placed on Tarn Taran. Major Singh of KCF was said to be the mastermind of the assassination.

On 23 August 1991, Sangha’s successor, Racchpal Singh Chandra along with fellow members of the Panthic Committee claimed responsibility for killing one police Inspector and three constables in Madhya Pradesh. The Inspector was said to be involved in Sangha’s killing.
