= Khalistan Commando Force =

Sikh Khalistani organisation

- Letterhead logo of the Khalistan Commando Force
- Founder: Manbir Singh Chaheru (executed)
- Leaders: Manbir Singh Chaheru (executed) (1986); Labh Singh † (1986–1988); Kanwarjit Singh Sultanwind † (1988–1989); Gurjant Singh Rajasthani † (1988–1991) (Faction); Paramjit Singh Panjwar (1989–2023) † (Faction); Wassan Singh Zaffarwal (1988-2001)(Faction)
- Dates active: 1986 – present
- Ideology: Separatism
- Status: Banned by the Government of India

The Khalistan Commando Force (KCF) is a pro-Khalistan militant organisation operating in the state of Punjab, India with prominent members based in Canada, United Kingdom and Pakistan. Its objective is the creation of a Sikh state of Khalistan through armed struggle. It is also responsible for many assassinations in India, including the 1995 assassination of Beant Singh, Chief Minister of Punjab, India. It is designated as a terrorist organisation by the Government of India.

== Objective ==
The creation of a Sikh independent state of Khalistan through armed struggle is their primary goal. KCF primarily targeted Indian security forces including CRPF, BSF and other police forces. It targeted Hindus who were against the Khalistan movement. The primary source of funding of KCF is looting, bank robbery and extortion. It is also involved in large scale smuggling of weapons from Pakistan to India across the International border.

== History ==
Khalistan Commando Force was founded by the Sarbat Khalsa and Panthic Committee. It was the official army of Khalistan. Manbir Singh Chaheru was made the leader in February 1986.

On 8 August 1986, Punjab Police arrested Manbir Singh Chaheru ("Hari Singh"), and he was eventually killed or disappeared while in police custody. After Chaheru was arrested, former police officer Sukhdev Singh, also known as Sukha Sipahi, took command of the KCF. Sukhdev Singh changed his name to Labh Singh and assumed the title of "General".

After his death the KCF was headed by Kanwarjit Singh Sultanwind On 18 October 1989, Kanwarjit Singh Sultanwind, and another two KCF members were arrested by police near Jalandhar. While one member managed to escape, Kanwarjit Singh Sultanwind, then 23 years old, swallowed a cyanide capsule to avoid giving information about the group.

== Decline ==
Operation Black Thunder against the Sikh militants in Golden Temple greatly degraded the capability of KCF to conduct operations. Police killed Labh Singh on 12 July 1988. His loss damaged the organisation. After his death, the Khalistan Commando Force split into factions including those led by Wassan Singh Zaffarwal, Paramjit Singh Panjwar and Gurjant Singh Rajasthani.

Another result of Labh Singh's death was the failure of the Khalistan Commando Force - Babbar Khalsa alliance, as the relationship established by Labh Singh and Sukhdev Singh Babbar was lost.

The group broke into multiple factions.

This organization eventually rendered unable to operate after all of its chiefs, local commanders, militants were killed or captured by Indian security forces by late 1990s.

== Activities ==
=== 1980s ===
1. On 6 March 1986, according to police Manbir Singh's planned attack on Kabul Singh, acting president of Shiromani Gurdwara Parbandhak Committee (SGPC), was carried out in Kapurthala. The attack killed 7 and injured 13. It was carried out by KCF members. According to police 6 men in a jeep opened fire on the escort of Kabul Singh and a police men. Kabul Singh managed to survive, but was seriously wounded. According to othee sources the real target was Deputy Superintendent of Police (DSP) Jarnail Singh Brar and that Kabul Singh was caught in the crossfire. The KCF members used stenguns. This attack was condemned by the Panthic Committee and the All India Sikh Student Federation(AISSF).
2. On 7 March 1986, Manbir Singh and co burned the home of Jaskirit Singh in Kassochal.
3. On March 26, 1986, KCF members killed Arjan Singh Mastana an MLA and leader of Communist Party of India.
4. On March 29, 1986, Manbir Singh and co were allegedly responsible (According to Surjit Singh Barnala) for an attack in Nakodar killing 12. They shot at a brick kiln and a nearby barber shop.
5. 6 officers were killed, and more injured, in a violent attack on the District court in Jalandhar, Punjab, India by KCF. Accounts of the attack, reported on 6 April 1986 in the US, differed. According to an unidentified source in Mahmood's "Fighting for Faith and Nation: Dialogues with Sikh Militants", the attack was made by KCF leader Manbir Singh Chaheru and his associates. "The Courier" of Arizona, US, carried a story attributed to UPI stating that 3 "Sikh terrorists" killed 3 police officers who were taking 3 prisoners to a bathroom, while "16 armed court guards cowered in fear". The report stated that 2 police holding a 4th prisoner were also gunned down, and that "Three other officers, a lawyer, and a bystander were wounded as the Sikhs sprayed the area for 15 minutes." Police said that the guards were too frightened to return fire. This fourth suspect remained in custody. Finally, the Courier article reported that the Sikhs looted "three rifles and a submachine gun" from the dead bodies, and that a 6th officer later succumbed to wounds from the attack. The "Wilmington Morning Star" carried an AP story, and related that 3 "Sikh extremists" killed 4 police officers inside the District Court complex, killed two officers who "were shot at the courtyard gate as the attackers fled", and wounded 4 other individuals, including a lawyer. The Star identified the freed suspects as Labh Singh, Gurinder Singh, and Swaranjit Singh, who were to appear in court on charges of slaying Ramesh Chander, a Hindu newspaper editor. The Star reported that District Magistrate S.C. Aggarwal said 4 attackers fired over a compound wall from a lane. It further reported that others witnessed the attackers open fire from close range as police led the prisoners to the toilet. The report concluded with District Police Chief Baljit Singh Sandhu's statement that the attackers hard "fired at least 50 rounds" in the attack. The "Eugene Register-Guardian" reported that District Magistrate S.C. Aggarwal said in a telephone interview that 3 or more attackers opened fire as 4 defendants accused of the May 1984 slaying of Ramesh Chander, were being led into the compound, and that the attackers took 3 rifles from the slain police. This single incident became a basis of Roberio's "Bullet for bullet" policy.
6. According to Harjinder Singh Jinda after Labh Singh was free they both met each other in Jalandhar along with Chaheru. Chaheru had told them that they were in urgent need of money. Labh Singh and Jinda told Chaheru that they would get the cash in a week. They began to scout banks in Jalandhar and selected one to rob. 3 days later at 11 in the morning Labh Singh, Jinda, and others robbed the bank of 1,250,000 rupees. (US$250,000)
7. Tarsem Singh Kohar, the main hit man of KCF, along with Sukhdev Singh hijacked a train on 10 April which resulted in the death of 5 police officers.
8. On 15 July 1986 Manbir Singh organised an attack on Karpurthala Jail to rescue 2 Sikh militants. The militants were Balwinder Singh and Jagjit a Singh Gill. Both of whom were “dreaded” militants. In the jailbreak 2 guards were killed and their weapons were taken.
9. The organisation battled Indian military forces, especially in revenge for Operation Blue Star, the government's 1984 military operation in the Harimandir Sahib (Golden Temple) in Amritsar.
10. Manbir Singh was arrested on 8 August 1986. Manbir Singh would later be executed in an extrajudicial killing by police. Manbir was the first head of KCF and had broken Labh Singh out of prison. Sarbjit Singh Ropar who was responsible for Manbir Singh's arrest and the acting chairperson for a faction of All India Sikh Student Federation was kidnapped by KCF on 28 August. He was interrogated by Labh Singh and revealed his hand in the arrest and his fathers who was a Deputy Superintendent of Police (DSP). He also revealed his hand in the arrests of Tarsem Singh Kohar and Waryam Singh. He was soon executed by Labh Singh along with Hardeep Sahota, and Hans Raj Ghuman. Hardeep and Hans were also involved in the arrest of multiple militants and Manbir Singh.
11. In 1984, General Arun Vaidya had planned and supervised Operation Blue Star – a controversial military operation ordered by Indira Gandhi, then Prime Minister of India, On 10 August 1986, General Arun Vaidya was shot to death by Jinda and Sukha while he was driving his car home from the market. According to the police, the assailants pulled up next to his car on motor scooters and fired eight or nine shots into the car. Vaidya reportedly died instantly of head and neck wounds. His wife, who was also in the car, was wounded by four bullets in her back and thighs. According to Indian intelligence sources, Vaidya had been the number four assassination target on lists by Sikh militants and he was one of several people killed in retaliation for Operation Blue Star. Following the assassination, the Khalistan Commando Force issued a statement declaring that Vaidya had been killed in retaliation for the Operation Blue Star.
12. On 1 September 1986 Labh Singh (Head of KCF) assassinated Additional District and Sessions Judge R.P. Gaind. He was shot 4 times dead in a store while on the phone. His wife and daughter watched the killing. This shooting put secure forces on high alert across Punjab. He had been receiving death threats over his verdict on a case prating to Sodhal Mandir in Jalandhar. A room of it was used by Sikh for worship. Sikh demanded the room that was used for Sikh worship become a Gurdwara.
13. In September 1986 KCF members under Labh Singh robbed a bank in Talwara. the bank manager was killed and 29,000 rupees (386,000 rupees in 2023. US$4,700 in 2023) was stolen.
14. In September 1986 KCF, whose leader was Labh Singh, killed Darshan Singh Canadian an MLA and party leader of the Communist Party of India. Darshan Singh opposed Sikh militants and Khalistan supporting NRI Sikhs. He actively campaigned against both.
15. In September 1986 KCF members under Labh Singh also killed Baldev Singh Mann. He was a left-wing activist of the Communist Party of India (Marxist–Leninist) New Democracy. He was a state level leader of Kirti Kisan Union and the editor of Hirawal Dasta Baldev was gunned down by 4 men in his home village near Amritsar. He was walking with his brother who escaped unhurt.
16. On September 29 of 1986 KCF members under Labh Singh robbed a bank in Tar tarn Sahib. The bank manager was killed.
17. On October 3rd 1986 men identified in the press as Sikh militants in police uniforms attacked Director-General Punjab Police Julio Francis Ribeiro inside his headquarters in the city of Jalandhar, Punjab, India, with automatic weapons. One guard was killed, and Ribeiro, his wife, and four other officers were injured. Ribeiro's wound was minor, but his wife was hospitalised. KCF later claimed responsibility for this attack.
18. In a phone call to news organisations Labh Singh, head of KCF, claimed responsibility for the killing of 4 members of a police patrol near Amritsar.
19. In October 1986 Labh Singh personally led a bank robbery in Talwara at the State Bank of India. According to police 4 Sikhs robbed the bank and 2 people were killed and another 2 wounded. The robbery occurred in broad daylight. US$176,000 was stolen. (US$488,000 in 2023)
20. In October 1986 Labh Singh and his fellow militants robbed 1,023,000 rupees (2023 20,392,784 rupees. 2023 US $250,000) from a bank in Ludhiana.
21. In October 1986 Labh Singh and his fellow militants robbed 800,000 rupees (10,650,000 rupees in 2023. US$130,000 in 2023) from the Millar Ganj branch of the Punjab National Bank, Ludhiana.
22. In December 1986 a few months after Manbir Singh's arrest a police informent who caused Manbir's arrest was supposedly killed by the KCF. He was killed along with his wife and 2 of his children. A third child was wounded.
23. In November 1986 Jinda and fellow KCF members killed Congress leader Doctor Kalicharan Sharma in Ludhiana. He was a major leader of Hindus. Sharma had been a critic of the Punjabi Suba movement, and Jarnail Singh Bhindranwale.
24. In late 1986 KCF members led by Labh Singh killed DSP (Deputy Superintendent of Police) in his home along with his son as they both slept. After killing him they stole his stengun. The DSP had been accused of harassing Sikhs and families of militants.
25. On 11 January 1987 Harjinder Singh Jinda and another militant of the Khalistan Commando Force assassinated Inspector General of Punjab Prisons Trilok Chand Katoch. Katoch was killed in 3 shoots near his home in Chandigarh. Jinda and another fled on a scooter. Katoch was the highest ranking police official to be killed up to that point. A letter stamped by Labh Singh was left on the dead body claiming responsibility and justifying the killing.
26. On 12 January 1987 KCF claimed responsibility for the killing of Mohinder Kaur, her two daughters, and a house worker for being police informants.
27. In February 1987 many lead members of KCF participated in India's largest bank robbery. 57 million Rupees (Equivalent to about ₹ 984.5 million in 2023 and US$12 million in 2023) were stolen belonging to Reserve Bank of India. There were no casualties and it is considered a major form of financing for KCF.
28. On February 16, 1987, Harjinder Singh Jinda killed Communist Party of India (Marxist) veteran leader and MLA Chanan Singh near Hoshiarpur. In a letter to the media Jinda said that Dhoot committed blasphemy and spoke out against Sikhs.
29. On 30 March 1987 Harjinder Singh Jinda, who had assassinated Lalit Maken, Arjun Dass, General Vaidya, and others, was being transported by police. 15 KCF members, who were armed with submachine guns and pistols, surrounded a rogue police van and blocked the front and back with two vehicles. They demanded Jinda be released or they would open fire. Jinda was released and the militants fled.
30. In late March 1987 KCF issued a 13 policy Sikh moral code which all were to adhere to. The policies were to end dancing at weddings, end music at weddings, end to the wearing of non-traditional clothing, no tweezing of eyebrows for girls, no snipping of beards for boys, no baraats that include more than 11 people, no participation in Hindu jagratas or all-night prayers, no associating with Radhasoami Sikhs, no school uniforms that are not saffron black, and white and the end of the sale and consumption of meat, alcohol and tobacco. Those who did not respect the law were warned that they would be burnt alive. The code was largely followed. Sikh women began wearing traditional clothing and many meat, alcohol, and tobacco shops closed. Many restaurants brought in vegetarian items to the menu. Some did not follow the decree which put them in danger. Those who did not follow were forced to either pay off Sikhs or get security. Sikh leaders generally supported the decree. The enforcement of the decree in its first 2 months resulted in at least 6 killed, 60 shops burned, and complete or partial closure of 1,500 businesses. One survey found that there were no meat or cigarette shops between Amritsar and Phagwara. Famous restaurants that served meat had removed it from their menu and denied ever serving it. According to Assistant Deputy Inspector General of Police in Jalandhar A.S. Siddiqui the moral code was popular among Sikhs especially those living in rural areas. He said, “Women seem to be pleased with it and there is also the fact that the AISSF has been on a massive recruitment drive through their amrit prachar (preaching of Sikh baptism) meetings. There is one meeting a day in the state, and after every meeting an estimated 200 youths pledge themselves to the service of the panth." Militants justified the moral code by saying, "No avatars, Hindu or Sikh, ever did these things. To eat meat is the job of rakshasas (demons) and we don't want people to become rakshasas."
31. On 27 April 1987 KCF members attacked a court in Amritsar and freed 3 KCF members, Ranjit Singh Rana, Kanwarjit Singh, and Rajbinder Singh. KCF members drove into the guarded court complex and opened fire on officers transporting prisoners. The attack lasted 3 minutes with the KCF members spraying the police with bullets. No KCF members was hurt. One unidentified rickshaw puller was killed and 2 officers were seriously wounded.
32. On 5 May, of 1987 KCF members robbed 850,000 rupees (10,400,000 rupees in 2023. US$126,500 in 2023) from the Bank of India branch in Guru Amar Das market.
33. On 19 May 1987 KCF under Labh Singh killed Deepak Dhawan who was the State Committee member of the Communist Party of India (Marxist). Dhawan was riding his scooter near Sanghe. KCF members approached him and told him to try and run. He tried to run, but they shot him as he tried.
34. On July 6, 1987, Labh Singh led KCF members who killed 75 Indian Army soldiers involved in Operation Blue Star and injured many more. Labh Singh and other KCF members first attack soldiers being transported by bus in Haryana killing around 40 soldiers and injuring around 30. Next they attacked and killed 35 soldiers in Fatehbad and injured others who were also being transported by bus.
35. On July 14, 1987, retired Head Constable Darshan Singh was killed in his field in Miarpur, Gurdaspur. Darshan, before retiring, was the bodyguard of DSP Gurbachan who Labh Singh had killed. Darshan had also been accused by Bhindranwale of killing innocent Sikhs.
36. On 22 July 1987 KCF members under Labh Singh entered the farmhouse of Swaran Singh an official and vice president of the Amritsar district of the Communist Party of India. They went to where he slept with his family and opened fire. Swaran Singh, his wife. his mother, and his daughter were all killed in the fire. Swaran Singh's two other daughters were wounded, but his 5-year-old son was unhurt. They also opened fire at the porch killing a worker, and injuring two others. A note was left claiming responsibility and saying it was over Swaran Singh's protests against the Sikh militants and Khalistan.
37. On 21 September 1987 Sulakhan Singh revealed that he had been attacked and left for dead. Sulakhan was a senior priest of the Golden Temple. He had been suspected of being a police informant. KCF members under Labh Singh and Bhindranwale Tiger Force of Khalistan (BTKF) members under Gurbachan Singh Manochahal beat him with iron rods and sharp weapons. He suffered many wounds, but none were life-threatening. Sulakhan denied being a police informant. Sulakhan also had police security.
38. Under Labh Singh in 1987 KCF members on motorcycles shot dead Communist Party of India (Marxist) member Dr. Gurdial Singh.
39. On 13 March 1988 at Kalchian, 25 kilometres from Amritsar, 4 KCF members stormed the homes of Communist Party of India members. The 2 party members were taken by them and were forced to disclose the location of the village head. After reaching the home of the village leader the 2 party members were killed along with the village leader. The village leader was killed for his support of Rajiv Gandhi and participation in anti Khalistan rallies organised by Gandhi.
40. On 17 March 1988 Jaimal Singh Padha was assassinated by KCF members under Labh Singh. He was a leader of the Kirti Kisan Union, a Communist Party of India (Marxist–Leninist) Liberation front. Jaimal had written against religious communalism which angered Sikh militants. In one of his essays, he also spoke against Khalistan.
41. On 23 March 1988 Pash, whose real name was Avtar Singh Sandhu, was killed by KCF members under Labh Singh. Paash was a supporter of the "ultra leftist Naxalite movement". He would write in support of communism and was a vocal critic of Sant Jarnail Singh Bhindranwale. Labh Singh is said to have regretted this killing in his diary.
42. In November 1988 KCF members assassinated Major General B.N. Kumar.
43. On 19 April 1989, Gurjant Singh Rajasthani and KCF members of his faction robbed a branch of the State Bank of India in Sadul. During the robbery the bank manager pressed the alarm leading to the Kharkus only getting 73,000 rupees. (7 million rupees in 2023) The bank manager was shot because of this. Afterwards the militants clashed with police killing multiple officers. 15 people were killed and over 50 injured.
44. KCF commander Surinder Singh Shinda claimed responsibility for killing on Assistant Sub-Inspector and injuring other officers.
45. KCF commander Surinder Singh Shinda claimed responsibility for killing a police informant.
46. On 11 September 1989 KCF member Gurdeep Singh Deepa and other members killed 3 “police cats”. (Police cats were militants turned police who became police insiders within the militants.) The 3 had aided in the arrest of 2 Sikh militants who would be killed in extrajudicial executions.
47. On 18 September 1989 KCF members assassinated Sohan Singh Dhesi. Dhesi was the general secretary of the Shaheed Bhagat Singh Naujawan Sabha. He was also the State Secretary of the Democratic Youth Federation of India.
48. On September 22, 1989, KCF claimed responsibility for an attack on the Superintendent of Police Operations and CRPF 48th Battalion Commander in Moharval. In the attack 20 CRPF men were killed.
49. On September 22, 1989, KCF claimed responsibility for killing 5 Black Cat Commandos in Thana Ghat.
50. On October 27, 1989, KCF claimed responsibility for an attack, a few weeks before, on a CRPF and Police convoy which killed 18 officers including a Deputy Superintendent of Police and a Superintendent of Police.
51. KCF also attacked sellers of alcohol, cigarettes, and other items prohibited by conservative Sikhism.

=== 1990s ===
1. According to Loveshinder Singh Dalewal in the 1980s and 1990s he and KCF member Gurdeep Singh Deepa “punished” 8 different men for beating women, or sexually assaulting them.
2. 9 BSP workers were killed by an alleged KCF member in Nurmahal.
3. On February 16, 1990, KCF, BTFK (Sangha), BKI, and SSF collectively claimed responsibility for an explosion in Phillaur that killed Inspector Harcharan Singh Soori and Assistant Sub-Inspector Ram Moorti on the 11th. The bomb also wounded 2 Sergeants. The explosion happened in an armoured and guarded police training facility. Both were put in a special armoured room for extra safety, but were killed at 9 pm from an explosion within their room. Both officers had been accused of torturing Sikhs. Inspector Soori had survived a previous assassination attempt in 1988.
4. On March 2, 1990, KCF, KLF, BKI, and SSF collectively claimed responsibility for killing 1 Sergeant and 1 Constable of Punjab Police in Nagoke for alleged “misdeeds”.
5. On March 2, 1990, KCF, KLF, BKI, and SSF collectively claimed responsibility for a bomb attack in Philaur that killed 1 police constable and 2 others. They stated that they were killed because they had put fake cases on locals.
6. On March 2, 1990, KCF claimed responsibility for killing 2 people over them slaughtering cows and issued a warning to others.
7. On March 2, 1990, KCF faction chief Gurjant Singh Rajasthani and BTFK chief Gurbachan Singh Manochahal claimed responsibility for killing Amritsar Jail Superintendent Pyara Lal. They claimed he tortured Sikhs in prison.
8. On March 5, 1990, KCF killed 2 rapists near Tarn Taran.
9. On March 15, 1990, Gurjant Singh Rajasthani claimed responsibility for an attack on the Superintendent of Police (SP) of Ludhiana. The SP managed to survive the attack, but his driver was killed.
10. On March 15, 1990, Gurjant Singh Rajasthani claimed responsibility for killing a head of a taxi company.
11. On March 16, 1990, BTFK and KCF claimed responsibility for destroying 2 police vehicles, killing 4 home guards, and inuring 2 home guards near Riaa. They also warned officers in nearby villages and cities to leave their jobs in 10 days or meet a similar fate.
12. On March 16, 1990, KLF, SSF, BKI, and KCF claimed responsibility for killing a police informant named Bhagwant Singh who was involved in over 50 killings. He was also a key associate of Gobind Ram.
13. Bakshish Singh Seetha, Lieutenant General of KCF, claimed responsibility for killing an Assistant Sub-Inspector in Kalla Thana.
14. Gurjant Singh Rajasthanhi claimed responsibility for killing 3 police informants near Patiala.
15. KCF area commander Gurmet Singh claimed responsibility for killing Punjab National Motor Transport Union president Nachhtar Singh for alleged blasphemy and actions against militants.
16. KCF claimed responsibility for killing All India Sikh Student Federation General Secretary Harminder Singh Sandhu in Amristar. He was a member of Sant Jarnail Singh Bhindranwale's inner circle, but chose to surrender during Operation Blue Star instead of fighting. Because of this he was alleged to be a government mole. KCF chief Parmjit Singh Panjwar said that the police falsely blamed them and they didn't kill Sandhu.
17. On April 6, 1990, KCF claimed responsibility for killing 2 people near Amritsar for allegedly sexually harassing women.
18. On April 10, 1990, KCF claimed responsibility for killing 3 rapists near Ramvala.
19. On April 14, 1990, KCF claimed responsibility for killing 1 police officer in Panjwar.
20. On July 23, 1990, KLF, KCF, BKI, and SSF collectively claimed responsibility for killing the Chief Engineer of the SYL, ML Sekhri, and Superintending Engineer of the SYL, Avtar Singh. They were killed while attending a meeting with fellow engineers in Chandigarh.
21. On September 4, 1990, KCF claimed responsibility for killing 2 police informant.
22. On September 21, 1990, KCF, KLF, BKI, and SSF claimed responsibility for an attack on a SPO base which killed 2 officers.
23. On September 21, 1990, KCF, KLF, BKI, and SSF claimed responsibility for killing a Nirankari in Patiala.
24. On September 28, 1990, KCF, KLF, BKI, and SSF claimed responsibility for killing Inspector Rajinderpal Singh.
25. On November 23, 1990, KCF, KLF, BKI, BTFK, and SSF claimed responsibility for killing Congress president of Jalandhar district, Gurdarshan Singh. They claimed he was a police informant involved in the killing of militants.
26. On November 24, 1990, at 9 am Major Singh KCF (Panjwar) along with other militant groups part of the Sohan Singh Committee killed Superintendent of Police (Operations) Harjit Singh in a bomb blast at Tarn Taran. Sikh militants had been studying Harjit's travel routes for some time. A remote-controlled bomb had been placed on a road Harjit usually drove by to go to the doctor. When Harjit's lead security vehicles drove by and it was just his vehicle over the bomb it was detonated. In the explosion three of his security guards were killed and his vehicle was destroyed. Harjit's limbs were found over 100 meters away from the location of the explosion. A permanent curfew was put on the town after. A saying about the incident is, “He had a security vehicle in front of him and behind him, so he would be safe from all sides. But he didn’t count on his death coming from below”. Twenty-two days prior to his death Harjit had killed the chief of BTFK (S) Sukhwinder Singh Sangha along with four other militants. KLF, KCF, Babbar Khalsa, SSF, and BTFK (S) members held a meeting afterward pledging to kill Harjit within 31 days of Sangha's death. Major Singh of KCF was given the lead role in the killing. A famous kavishri ballad about this incident says, “24th November at exactly 9, for Sangha’s revenge Major Singh and his allies have arrived. Without wasting any time Kharkus have come to kill him… The 5 jathebandis [Groups] had said we would hit him hard… To become SSP he had done many misdeeds… Watch how with a computer system [remote-controlled bomb] Kharkus blow him up. Harjit’s wife watches his limbs blow up… Operation Shera has been done on the SP of Operation.”
27. On 8 June 1991, Gurdeep Singh Deepa and other KCF members killed Communist Party Marxist candidate Varinder Kumar Gagan in Nakodar. He was killed with 2 of his gunmen and 1 party worker.
28. A June 1991 attack on a passenger train in northwestern Punjab killed about fifty, mostly Hindu, passengers.
29. On August 29, 1991, Gurjant Singh Rajasthani attempt to assassinate Senior Superintendent of Police (SSP) Sumedh Saini in Chandigarh with a bomb attack. Saini “narrowly” survived the attempt. 3 of his bodyguards were killed.
30. On 31 August 1991, Gurjant Singh Rajasthani, head of a faction of KCF, was killed in an encounter with police. There was a 2,000,000 rupee bounty on him at the time. He was surrounded by senior police officials and their teams in a house where he was along with his wife and 3-year-old son. Rajasthani fired at police as he escaped from the back of the house. Police returned fire. Rajasthani was later found dead. Before dying he yelled, “Khalistan zindabad” (Meaning long live Khalistan) and ate a cyanide capsule.
31. On 9 October 1991, KCF (Panjwar) along with Bhindranwale Tiger Force, Khalistan Liberation Force, and the Sikh Students Federation kidnapped Romanian charge d’affaires Lividu Radu. Radu was taken from his car at around 8 am. He was forced into the vehicle of the Kharkus by 4 Sikhs who were armed. Quickly after the kidnapping, many raids were launched by security forces. Exit routes from Delhi were blocked and authorities in Uttar Pradesh and Haryana were warned of the situation. The kidnappers demanded the release of the killers of General Vaidya whom were Harjinder Singh Jinda, Nirmal Singh Nimma and Sukhdev Singh Sukha. The kidnappers threatened to cut Radu in pieces if their demands weren't met by 19 October. The deadline passed, but Sikh militants did not harm Radu. The Indian government refused to meet any of the Sikh's demands. Radu was kept in Delhi until 27 October. He was then moved to Punjab by car. On 25 November Radu was released unharmed after 48 days.
32. On October 11, 1991, KCF (Z) claimed responsibility for killing 2 Hindu extremists near Nat village. They claimed that the Hindus had destroyed the Babri Masjid.
33. In November 1991 KCF members killed Sarwan Singh Cheema who the secretary of the Communist Party of India (Marxist). He was gunned down along with security guards Santokh Singh, Ram Lubhaya, Raghubir Chand, Mohindar Singh and head constable Paramjit Singh of Punjab Police.
34. On October 26, 1991, R.N. Goyal, Chief Health Officers Ludhiana, Bachitar Singh Director Health Services Punjab, and 5 others were killed by KCF, KLF, BTFK, BKI, and SSF. They claimed that the doctors had forged autopsy's, improperly treated Sikhs, and aided in police killings.
35. On 27 January 1992, KCF (Wassan faction) members killed Superintendent of Police, R. P. S. Teja and injured 5 other officers as they executed a search operation.
36. On 23 January 1992, Gurdeep Singh Deepa, Deputy Chief of KCF, attacked BJP President Muril Manohar Joshi's caravan. The caravan was a part of the Ekta Yatra. The attack happened in Phagwara. As the caravan entered Phagwara the lead bus was attacked by Deepa and another with Ak-47's. They had disguised themselves as police officers. 3 were killed. They were the driver and 2 party workers. 40 others were injured.
37. On 15 March 1992, Gurdeep Singh Deepa, KCF's deputy chief, killed SHO (Station House Officer) Mann Singh in Phillaur. Mann had been dubbed a butcher and had been a target of Sikh militants for much time.
38. On 26 April 1992, Gurdeep Singh Deepa and other KCF members killed Akali Dal MLA Balwant Singh Sarhal. Sarhal was killed along with 3 of his bodyguards.
39. On 9 October 1992, Harjinder Singh Jinda and Sukhdev Singh Sukha, assassins of General Arun Vaidya, were hanged until death in Pune jail.
40. On 12 October 1992 KCF killed Darshan Singh Kaypee and his bodyguard, a police constable, in Jalandhar. According to police 2 KCF members on an Enfield motorcycle rode up beside Kaypee's car. From there they opened fire with an assault rifle. He was a 5 time MLA for the Congress Party (I), former Punjab state minister, and was the vice-president of the Punjab Congress Party.
41. A September 1993 bombing in New Delhi targeting Indian Youth Congress president Maninderjeet Singh Bitta that killed eight people.
42. The KCF was listed in 1995 one of the 4 "major militant groups" in the Khalistan movement.
43. KCF is responsible for the assassination of Punjab Chief Minister Beant Singh in 1995.
44. According to the Department of State the Khalistan Commando Force was involved in the assassination of the Chief Minister of Punjab, Beant Singh.

=== 2000s ===
1. In June 2006 a member of the Panjwar faction of the KCF, Kulbir Singh Barapind was extradited from the US to India. He was deported to India for belonging to a terrorist organisation and for entering the United States with a false passport. He was wanted in India for thirty-two cases, but was arrested for three murders in the early 1990s. After his arrest, he stated that he would renew the Khalistan movement through peaceful means. Panjwar was killed by two unidentified gunmen in Lahore in May 2023. The investigation began in 2003, when Khalid Awan, jailed at the time for credit card fraud, bragged of his relationship with Paramjeet Singh Panjwar, leader of the KCF. Awan was given a 14-year prison sentence in 2007 on terrorism charges.
2. In 2008, Punjab Police announced they had foiled a KCF effort to kill Gurmeet Ram Rahim Singh, head of Dera Sacha Sauda.

== Present status ==
Paramjeet Singh Panjwar remained the head of the remaining faction of the KCF as of 2008, and was listed at that time as one of the top 10 most wanted criminals in India. As per the released statement of Khalid Awan – a Canadian citizen – who served 14-year sentence in the U.S. prisons for transferring money to KCF, Panjwar was a VIP in Pakistan and has the support of Pakistan's Inter-Services Intelligence agency. On the other hand, the U.S. prosecutors have claimed that Awan admitted of transferring money to Panjwar despite knowing the fact that the money will be used to carry out attacks against India.

The University of Maryland beta version of the "Global Terrorism Database" has recorded 2 attacks on military targets, 9 attacks on police or other government targets, and 9 attacks against civilian, religious, transportation or educational entities, in both India and Pakistan, as of June 2009.

The KCF remains banned in India under the Unlawful Activities (Prevention) Act and designated as terrorist organisation by the Government of India.

A 2011 NPR report claimed a person associated with this group was imprisoned in a highly restrictive Communication Management Unit in the US.

On 6 May 2023, Paramjeet Singh Panjwar was shot dead and his bodyguard injured while out on a walk early morning in Lahore’s Johar Town, by two unidentified bike-borne men. It is widely believed he was killed by R&AW operatives.

== See also ==
- Sikh extremism
- Kharku
- Babbar Khalsa
- International Sikh Youth Federation
- Khalistan Liberation Force
- Khalistan Zindabad Force
- Sikh massacre in Pilibhit forest
