= Labh Singh =

Leader of Khalistan Commando Force (1952–1988)

2nd Jathedar of Khalistan Commando Force
- In office 9 August 1986 – 12 July 1988
- Preceded by: Manbir Singh Chaheru
- Succeeded by: Kanwaljit Singh Sultanwind

Jathedar of Keshgarh Sahib
- In office 1988 – 12 July 1988

Personal details
- Born: 1952 Village Panjwar, Tarn Taran, India
- Died: 12 July 1988 (aged 35–36) Tanda, Hoshiarpur, Punjab, India
- Nickname: Sukha Sipahi

Military service
- Rank: General
- Battles/wars: Insurgency in Punjab

Sukhdev Singh Dhillon (1952 – 12 July 1988), also known as General Labh Singh and Sukha Sipahi, was a militant, ex Punjab police personnel, and Sikh separatist who took command of the Khalistan Commando Force after its first leader, Manbir Singh Chaheru, was arrested in 1986. Labh Singh was a close associate of Jarnail Singh Bhindranwale who committed multiple targeted attacks with Surinder Singh Sodhi and fought against the Indian Army during Operation Blue Star. He was involved in the assassination of retired Chief of Army Staff Arun Vaidya and the attack on the Director-General of the Punjab Police, Julio Francis Ribeiro. He was involved in multiple assassinations of police, and government officials as well as targeted attacks on Communists. Labh Singh was the mastermind behind the Lalru bus massacre and Fatehabad bus massacre killing 74 bus passengers. He masterminded what was then India's largest bank robbery, taking almost ₹57 million (equivalent to ₹780 million or US$8.3 million in 2026) from the Punjab National Bank, Miller Gunj branch, Ludhiana. Labh Singh mastermind many other robberies which enabled the Khalistan Commando Force to buy weapons.

== Early life ==
Labh Singh's original name was Sukhdev Singh Dhillon He was also known as Sukha Sipahi. He lived in the village of Panjwar, in Tehsil (sub-district) Patti in district Tarn Taran and owned 9 acres (36,000 m^{2}) of land. He married Davinder Kaur.

== Punjab Police service ==
After finishing his education at Baba Buddha Sahib College, Labh Singh joined the Punjab Police force in 1971 and served the force until he left his job in May 1983.

== Militancy under Jarnail Singh Bhindranwale ==
Influenced by Jarnail Singh Bhindranwale, Labh Singh left the Punjab police in May 1983, and joined the Sikh militant movement. He was involved in militancy prior to his departure and was suspected to be involved in an attack on Inspector Harjit Singh. Labh Singh rose to become a very close associate of Jarnail Singh and a key hitman of Jarnail Singh. He along with Surinder Singh Sodhi were Bhinranwale's chief hitmen.

=== Various assassinations and attack ===
On 27 October 1982, Labh Singh, Surinder Singh Sodhi, and another militant killed Resham Singh. Resham was the Sant Nirankari head of Hoshiarpur District and 1 of the 7 Sant Nirankari stars which were the Sant Nirankari version of the Panj Pyare. Following the 1978 Sikh–Nirankari clash, which saw 13 Sikh killed and 150 injured, Nirankari were expelled by the Akal Takht out of the Sikh fold and became a target of attacks.

Resham had been receiving death threats for months and had been appointed a security guard from the Punjab Police. The day of the killing Resham's guard was on leave. Labh Singh and the other militants had disguised themselves as police officers. Labh Singh and the other militants drove-by on a Royal Enfield Bullet and shot Resham. Afterwards the militants stopped the motorcycle and shot Resham 3 more times. 2 stens and a pistol were used.

==== Killing Deputy Inspector General A.S. Atwal ====
On 25 April 1983, Deputy Inspector General (DIG) A.S. Atwal was killed while leaving the Golden Temple. In the killing 2 others were critically injured. Labh Singh was involved in the killing. After Atwal was killed his driver and bodyguards quickly escaped. Other units stationed nearby also fled instead of taking any action. His death was celebrated by the other militants in the Temple who fired victory shots. His corpse remained there for hours. Only after Punjab Chief Minister Darbara Singh phone Jarnail Singh Bhindranwale and got his permission was Atwal's body recovered. Atwal had killed 1 of Jarnail Singh's men and injured 3 others in am encounter causing him to be on the militant hit-list.

On 1 May 1983, Labh Singh and 2 other militants were accused of throwing a grenade at Inspector Harjit Singh's home while driving by on a motorcycle. Harjit survived the explosion, but it caused great damage to the surrounding area. Bhindranwale had accused Harjit of being involved in multiple extrajudicial executions of Sikhs and a “drinker of Sikh blood”.

On 30 May 1983, Sodhi along with Major Singh Nagoke and Labh Singh killed Inspector Bhagwan Singh Karianwala. He was gunned down in Sultanpur Lodhi in a busy market while patrolling. Bhagwan was killed along with his gunmen, a police constable. Sodhi, Labh and Nagoke grabbed the guns of the killed policemen, those being a sten and revolver. Bhagwan had been accused by Bhindranwale as being one of the leading officers in the torture of Sikhs.

On 15 August 1983, at around 1:15 PM Sodhi, Nagoke, and Labh Singh, from a motorcycle, opened fire on and killed Inspector Gurcharan Singh Sansi who was also on a motorcycle. Sansi was killed in Muktsar. Labh Singh had been targeting Sansi for some time. On 15 August he saw Sansi. Labh Singh and fellow militants had driven beside Sansi. Sodhi drove the motorcycle while Nagoke, and Labh Singh shot Sansi. His gunmen a police constable was shot, but managed to survive in an injured state. Both of their weapons were taken by Sodhi. Sodhi, Nagoke, and Labh Singh who drove away shouting "Bole so Nihal; Sat Sri Akal". Sansi had been accused of killing and "drinking the blood" of Sikhs by Bhindranwale. He was accused of being the leading officer in the torture of Sikhs.

On 26 September 1983, Makhan Singh, a Sergeant of Senior Superintendent of Police (SSP) Surjit Singh, was killed in Putlighar area of Amritsar outside of a hostel by Sodhi and Labh Singh. Makhan had made his way to a hotel where Labh Singh and Sodhi were in disguise. Labh Singh and Sodhi had been hunting Makhan for some time. Makhan was shot in the shoulder by Labh Singh. He ran out of the hostel and attempted to flee, but failed to do so and was killed outside with a spray of bullets in his head and chest. Sodhi and Labh Singh made a quick getaway. Police conducted multiple searches to find them, but they proved futile. Makhan had been on hit list of militants for much time. Makhan had been named by Sant Jarnail Singh as someone who was an enemy of Sikhs. He was also accused of being part of the torture and extrajudicial execution of Kulwant Singh Nagoke. Jarnail Singh accused him of 13 extrajudicial killings.

On 29 October 1983, Labh Singh with Makhan Singh Babbar and Sodhi attacked retired DSP (Deputy Superintendent of Police) Gurbachan Singh also known as Bachan Singh. Gurbachan was at a shop owned by his son. Sodhi and the others first disguised themselves as police officers. They then made their way to Gurbachan. Sodhi, Makhan, and Labh attacked Gurbachan and his security with Sten guns. The attack turned into a 30-minute shootout with a constable and salesmen being killed. A head constable, Karnail Singh, would later die of his wounds. Gurbachan lived by taking cover and playing dead. Surinder Singh Sodhi was injured in the attack. Makhan Singh was also injured in the attack and would receive blood from Manbir Singh Chaheru to live. Gurbachan Singh had tortured Amrik Singh He also had tortured Kulwant Singh Nagoke and after killed him in an extrajudicial execution. He was also involved in other extrajudicial executions. He had been named by Jarnail Singh as an enemy of the Panth and someone who, "..drank Sikh blood".

On 9 March 1984 Labh Singh along with Sodhi, and Gurmit Singh Sukha attacked the motorcade of Deputy Speaker of the Haryana Legislative Assembly Ved Pal. The attack occurred when he was going from Delhi to Karnal. MLA Shanti Devi was along with Ved Pal at the time of the attack. Labh Singh and his associates opened fire from a motorcycle with Sten guns. The driver was killed, and a gunman seriously injured. Others escaped with minor injuries.

==== Killing BJP MLA Harbans Lal Khanna ====
On 2 April 1984, Surinder Singh Sodhi along with Labh Singh killed former MLA Harbans Lal Khanna in his shop in Amritsar. Khanna was the BJP district president at the time. His bodyguard and 1 or 2 customers of his shop were also killed. Sodhi and Labh Singh also burned down a police jeep by Khanna's shop. Sodhi and Labh Singh had posed as police officers. Sodhi waited outside on a motorcycle as Labh Singh entered the shop. Labh Singh opened fire with a stengun killing Khann's bodyguard and others, all of whom wete sitting. Khanna shouted frantically. Labh Singh said, “Dhoti, topi (hat), at Yamuna. Long live Khalistan.” He then killed Khanna.

Khanna had raised slogans translating to, “We are not going to let any second or third group exist, we are not going to let a turban remain on any head; the kacchera, the kara, the kirpan, send these to Pakistan". In February 1984 he led a mob that destroyed a replica of the Golden Temple at Amristar railway station and put feces and lit cigarettes on a painting of Guru Ram Das which had been on display for many years. All of this had made him a prime target for Sikhs. The killing of Khanna led to a 48-hour curfew in Amritsar and paramilitary and army deployment to the city. Soon rioting also broke out. The riots left at least 7 dead.

Labh Singh and Sodhi were given the duty of killing Bhajan Lal the Chief Minister of Haryana by Jarnail Singh Bhindranwale. Bhajan Lal had started the construction of SYL which was opposed by Sikh. Bhajan Lal as head of the Haryana government in November 1982 had Sikh indiscriminately stopped, searched, and humiliated who planned to hold a protest at the Delhi Asia Games. Bhindranwale blamed Bhajan Lal for rioting against Sikh in Haryana during early 1984. The rioting saw the burning of 24 saroops of Guru Granth Sahib, 6 Gurdwaras, shaving 125 Sikh, and stripping 3 Sikh girls. All of this made Bhajan Lal a key target. Once Sodhi, and Labh were in range of shooting Bhajan Lal, but had been ordered to chop off Bhajan Lal's head by Bhindranwale. Because of there devotion to honour Bhindranwale's words they left Bhajan Lal. Before being able to assassinate Bhajan Lal Sodhi would he killed. Bhindranwale would later claim that Bhajan Lal would be killed if Sodhi lived 15 days more.

On 14 April 1984 Surinder Singh Sodhi, one of Labh Singh's closest friends and the “right-arm” of Jarnail Singh Bhindranwale, was killed while drinking tea in a shop in Amritsar. Sodhi was killed by a men and a women. The women, Baljit Kaur, would go to the Golden Temple after the killing and confessed to the murder. Baljit Kaur was interrogated by Bhidnranwale. She admitted to the other killer being her boyfriend Surinder Singh Shinda, and to being paid by Gurcharan Singh, the general secretary of Akali Dal, to do the killing. She also implicated others. Bhindranwale vowed to avenge the killing. With this Labh Singh and fellow militants made their way to punish those who they deemed to be the culprits. Labh Singh and others killed Surinder Singh Shinda. He was chopped into 7 pieces for shooting Sodhi 7 times. He was killed within 24 hours of Bhindranwale vowing vengeance.

On 23 April 1984, Labh Singh and fellow militants robbed ₹44,583 (equivalent to ₹610,000 or US$6,500 in 2026) from Punjab and Sind bank in Amritsar. It was described as a “clean-operation” while also being described as “spontaneous”.

==== Killing of Deputy Superintendent of Police Gurbachan Singh ====
On 30 April 1984, retired Deputy Superintendent of Police (DSP) Gurbachan Singh, also known as Bachan Singh, was killed along with his wife, daughter, and a gunman in Amritsar. The killers were Labh Singh and Major Singh Nagoke. Gurbachan Singh had survived 4 previous attacks on his life and was a prime target of Sikhs. Gurbachan Singh had been accused of torturing Amrik Singh He also had been accused of torturing Kulwant Singh Nagoke and killing him in an extrajudicial execution. He had been named by Jarnail Singh as an "enemy" of the panth and someone who, “..drank Sikh blood”.

According to an alleged confession by a militant in May 1984, Labh Singh and fellow militants led by Amarjeet Singh Chawla plotted to assassinate former Chief Minister of Punjab Darbara Singh. The militants began to spy on Darbara and collected intel about his routine and movement is Delhi. On 9 May Labh and co obtained weapons and money for the assassination from Bhindranwale who said Chalwa would lead the militants. The weapons obtained were 1 stengun and 3 magazines for it. 2 .30 pistols, one .38 revolver and ammunition for it. Labh Singh and other militants began looking for Darbara, but before assassinating him militants involved in the plot were arrested and they were ordered to scrap the assassination by Harminder Singh Sandhu.

==== Killing of Ramesh Chander ====
On 12 May 1984, Labh Singh, Gursewak Singh Babla, Gurinder Singh and Swaranjit Singh were accused of killing Hind Samachar newspaper group editor Ramesh Chander, who was an outspoken critic of Jarnail Singh Bhindranwale and had written that Punjab had "become a slaughterhouse." Chander was killed in a busy intersection in Jalandhar. In a call to an Amritsar news agency Dashmesh Regiment claimed responsibility for the killing.

=== Operation Blue Star ===
During Operation Blue Star, Labh Singh fought against the Indian Army with other Sikh militants. His family was in the langar hall. He was arrested by the army after the operation.

== Khalistan Commando Force ==
=== Jailbreak ===
7 police officers were killed, and more injured, in a violent attack on the District court in Jalandhar, Punjab, India. Accounts of the attack, reported on 6 April 1986 in the US, differed. According to an unidentified source in Mahmood's "Fighting for Faith and Nation: Dialogues with Sikh Militants", the attack was masterminded by Sikh militant leader Manbir Singh Chaheru and his associates.

"The Courier" of Arizona, US, carried a story attributed to UPI stating that 3 "Sikh terrorists" killed 3 police officers who were taking 3 prisoners to a bathroom, while "16 armed court guards cowered in fear". The report stated that 2 police holding a 4th prisoner were also gunned down, and that "Three other officers, a lawyer, and a bystander were wounded as the Sikhs sprayed the area for 15 minutes." Police said that the guards were too frightened to return fire. This fourth suspect remained in custody. Finally, the Courier article reported that the Sikhs looted "three rifles and a submachine gun" from the dead bodies, and that a 6th officer later succumbed to wounds from the attack.

The "Wilmington Morning Star" carried an AP story, and related that 3 "Sikh extremists" killed 4 police officers inside the District Court complex, killed two officers who "were shot at the courtyard gate as the attackers fled", and wounded 4 other individuals, including a lawyer. The Star identified the freed suspects as Labh Singh, Gurinder Singh, and Swaranjit Singh, who were to appear in court on charges of slaying Ramesh Chander, a Hindu newspaper editor. The Star reported that District Magistrate S.C. Aggarwal said 4 attackers fired over a compound wall from a lane. It further reported that others witnessed the attackers open fire from close range as police led the prisoners to the toilet. The report concluded with District Police Chief Baljit Singh Sandhu's statement that the attackers hard "fired at least 50 rounds" in the attack.

The "Eugene Register-Guardian" reported that District Magistrate S.C. Aggarwal said in a telephone interview that 3 or more attackers opened fire as 4 defendants accused of the May 1984 slaying of Ramesh Chander, were being led into the compound, and that the attackers took 3 rifles from the slain police.

The “Associated Press” reported District Magistrate S.C. Aggarwal said in a telephone interview Sikh militants had killed 6 police officers and wounded 4 including a lawyer in an attack on the District Court in Jalandhar. They freed 3 prisoners accused of killing.

Julio Ribeiro, then Director General of Punjab Police, described the attack as a "well-throughout plan". According to Ribeiro, Labh Singh was being presented in court under the custody of 7 armed policemen. The officers were attacked by surprise by militants who killed all 7 with not a single officer firing a shot back. Labh Singha and his associates were successfully broken out and escaped. This single incident became a basis of Riberio's "Bullet for bullet" policy.

According to Harjinder Singh Jinda after Labh Singh was free they both met each other in Jalandhar along with Chaheru. Chaheru had told them that they were in urgent need of money. Labh Singh and Jinda told Chaheru that they would get the cash in a week. They began to scout banks in Jalandhar and selected one to rob. 3 days later at 11 in the morning Labh Singh, Jinda, and others robbed the bank of ₹1.25 million (equivalent to ₹17 million or US$180,000 in 2026)

=== Khalistan Command Force leadership ===
After KCF's first leader, Manbir Singh Chaheru was arrested, disappeared and presumed dead, Labh Singh took over the leadership of Khalistan Commando Force. One unnamed author speculated in "Genesis of terrorism: an analytical study of Punjab terrorists" that Labh Singh "perhaps" maintained his links with Babbar Khalsa International. Labh Singh united KCF and made KCF into a “cohesive” and “hierarchical” group. Labh Singh also appointed 6 Lieutenant-Generals who oversaw specific territories and led the KCF activities there.

=== Assassination of General Vaidya ===
In 1984, General Arun Vaidya had planned and supervised Operation Blue Star – a controversial military operation ordered by Indira Gandhi, then Prime Minister of India, in order to flush out a group of heavily armed Sikh militants in June 1984 at the Golden Temple, the holiest shrine of the Sikhs.

Vaidya had moved to Pune after his retirement from the army. On 10 August 1986, General Arun Vaidya was shot and killed by Jinda and Sukha while he was driving his car home from the market. According to the police, the assailants pulled up next to his car on motor scooters and fired eight or nine shots into the car. Vaidya reportedly died instantly of head and neck wounds. His wife, who was also in the car, was wounded by four bullets in her back and thighs. According to Indian intelligence sources, Vaidya had been the number four assassination target on lists by Sikh militants and he was one of several people killed in retaliation for Operation Blue Star. Following the assassination, the Khalistan Commando Force issued a statement declaring that Vaidya had been killed in retaliation for the Operation Blue Star.

==== Revenge killings for Manbir Singh’s arrest ====
Manbir Singh was arrested on 8 August 1986. Manbir Singh would later be executed in an extrajudicial killing by police. Manbir was the first head of KCF and had broken Labh Singh out of prison. Sarbjit Singh Ropar who was responsible for Manbir Singh's arrest and the acting chairperson for a faction of All India Sikh Student Federation was kidnapped by KCF on 28 August. He was interrogated by Labh Singh and revealed his hand in the arrest and his fathers who was a Deputy Superintendent of Police (DSP). He also revealed his hand in the arrests of Tarsem Singh Kohar and Waryam Singh. He was soon executed by Labh Singh along with Hardeep Sahota, and Hans Raj Ghuman. Hardeep and Hans were also involved in the arrest of multiple militants and Manbir Singh.

In December 1986, 4 moths after Manbir Singh's arrest, a police informant who caused Manbir's arrest was allegedly killed by the KCF. He was killed along with his wife and 2 of his children. A third child was wounded.

On 1 September 1986 Labh Singh assassinated Additional District and Sessions Judge R.P. Gaind. He was shot dead in a shop while on the phone. His wife and daughter witnessed the killing. This shooting put secure forces on high alert across Punjab. He had been receiving death threats over his verdict on a case prating to Sodhal Mandir in Jalandhar. A room of it was used by Sikhs for worship. Sikhs demanded the room that was used for Sikh worship become a Gurdwara.

=== Attack on Director General of Punjab Police ===
On 3 October 1986, 6 men identified in the press as Sikh militants in police uniforms attacked Director General of Punjab Police Julio Francis Ribeiro inside his Punjab Armed Police headquarters in the city of Jalandhar, with automatic weapons. According to Ribeiro he was strolling with his wife when Sikh militants in a jeep disguised as a police one asked to inspect a guards gun. The guards gave the gun for inspection. Soon 3 Sikh began climbing the wall and sprayed fire. After 2 minutes of fire they fled. Throughout all of this no officer returned fire or attempted to chase the Sikh. One guard was killed, and Ribeiro, his wife, and four other officers were injured. Ribeiro's wound was minor, but his wife was hospitalized. Khalistan Commando Force later claimed responsibility for this attack. KCF leader Labh Singh allegedly led the attack. Harjinder Singh Jinda was also part of the group that attacked Riberio.

==== Assassination of Inspector General Trilok Chand Katoch ====
On 11 January 1987, Jinda and a fellow militant of the Khalistan Commando Force assassinated Inspector General Trilok Chand Katoch. A note was left stamped by Labh Singh taking responsibility and warning other officers. Katoch was killed in 3 shoots near his home in Chandigarh. Jinda and another fled on a scooter. Katoch was the highest ranking police official to be killed up to that point. Katoch was one in charge of Punjab Prisons until late 1986 when he was put in charge of “overseeing internal discipline and enforcing administrative rules”. KCF claimed responsibility in a phone call and threatened to strike again. Jinda reavled the reasons why Katoch was assassinated in his letters. According to him Katoch had tortured Sikhs and falsely imprisoned them.

=== Sikh moral code ===
In late March 1987 KCF issued a 13 policy Sikh moral code which all were to adhere to. The policies were to end dancing at weddings, end music at weddings, end to the wearing of non-traditional clothing, no tweezing of eyebrows for girls, no snipping of beards for boys, no baraats that include more than 11 people, no participation in Hindu jagratas or all-night prayers, no associating with Radhasoami Sikhs, no school uniforms that are not saffron black, and white and the end of the sale and consumption of meat, alcohol and tobacco.

Those who did not respect the law were warned that they would be burnt alive. The code was largely followed. Sikh women began wearing traditional clothing and many meat, alcohol, and tobacco shops closed. Many restaurants brought in vegetarian items to the menu. Some did not follow the decree which put them in danger. Those who did not follow were forced to either pay off Sikhs or get security. Sikh leaders generally supported the decree. The enforcement of the decree in its first 2 months resulted in at least 6 killed, 60 shops burned, and complete or partial closure of 1,500 businesses.

One survey found that there were no meat or cigarette shops between Amritsar and Phagwara. Famous restaurants that served meat had removed it from their menu and denied ever serving it.

According to Assistant Deputy Inspector General of Police in Jalandhar A.S. Siddiqui the moral code had significant popularity among Sikhs especially those living in the p areas. He said, “Women seem to be pleased with it and there is also the fact that the AISSF has been on a massive recruitment drive through their amrit prachar (preaching of Sikh baptism) meetings. There is one meeting a day in the state, and after every meeting an estimated 200 youths pledge themselves to the service of the panth."

Militants justified the moral code by saying, "No avatars, Hindu or Sikh, ever did these things. To eat meat is the job of rakshasas (demons) and we don't want people to become rakshasas."

=== Massacres of civlians ===
Labh Singh masterminded numerous massacres of Hindus. The massacres in July, killing 74, were the deadliest Punjab had seen. A not e eft on the scene of the first massacre, signed by Labh Singh, stated "the flower of Sikh youth was being killed in Punjab", and in retaliation, a hundred Hindus would be killed for every Sikh killed. The note accused the Government of India of killing the Sikhs, and Hindus of not raising their voice against these killings.

==== Lalru massacre ====
On 6 July 1987 a bus traveling from Chandigarh to Rishikesh, a Hindu holy place. On the night of 6 July 1987, it carried 76 passengers (most of whom were Hindus), when five Sikh militants started trailing it in a car. The car suddenly blocked the bus, and the bus driver Hari Singh (the only Sikh on the bus) stpped the bus. Four armed men came out of the car, threatened him with a sten gun, and hijacked the bus. The hijackers told the passengers that they were only going to loot them, and started driving along the Grand Trunk Road. The Fiat car followed the bus. They drove the bus for around 8 km, while the passengers handed over their jewellery and cash. Around 21:30, just before the Lalru police station near the Punjab-Haryana border, they drove the bus off the main road onto a link road. They then started taunting the passengers, saying "Where is your Riberio now?", referring to Julio Ribeiro . They accused the passengers of laughing at the killings of the Sikh youth, and asked them to chant the Sikh phrase Sat Naam Wahe Guru ("Truth is the name of God"). They shouted "Make sure all Hindus are dead, you will see more blood if more Sikhs are killed!", referring to the anti-insurgent operations in Punjab. The hijackers stopped the bus between Jamalpur and Hasanpur villages, ordered the remaining passengers to huddle in the middle of the bus, and started shooting from both ends. The shooting lasted for about 5 minutes, and resulted in the death of 38 people, including 5 women and 4 children. Savitri Devi, a 28-year-old woman who was killed in the attack, saved her husband and their 5-month old daughter by shielding them from the bullets. A woman named Kalawati, jumped off the bus holding her three young children, and survived. 32 people were injured in the attack.

==== Fatehabad massacre ====
After abandoning the Lalru bus, the militants stopped an Ambassador car, shot the driver dead, and drove the car towards Fatehabad. Around 1 km later, they stopped another Haryana Roadways bus going to Sirsa. This time, they did not board the overcrowded bus, and fired at the passengers from outside, possibly because they were in a hurry to leave. The shooting left 34 people dead. Apart from the 34 dead, 18 people were injured in the attack. The attackers then hijacked a truck, and drove to the Punjab border via Fatehabad and Ratia. The truck was found at the Marianwala village near Batala; its various parts including the engine and the tires, were missing.

=== Attacks on security forces ===
In November 1986 in a phone call to news organizations Labh Singh claimed responsibility for the killing of 4 members of a police patrol near Amritsar.

On 27 April 1987 KCF members attacked a court in Amritsar and freed 3 KCF members, Ranjit Singh Rana, Kanwarjit Singh, and Rajbinder Singh. KCF members drove two vans into the guarded court complex and opened fire on officers transporting prisoners. The attack lasted 3 minutes with the KCF members spraying the police with bullets. No KCF members was hurt. One unidentified rickshaw puller was killed and 2 officers were seriously wounded.

On 14 July 1987, retired Head Constable Darshan Singh was killed in his field in Miarpur, Gurdaspur by Labh Singh and fellow militants. Darshan, before retiring, was the bodyguard of DSP Gurbachan Singh who Labh Singh had also killed.

On 8 September 1987 Labh Singh claimed responsibility for an attack on a Central Reserve Police Force jeep killing 3 officers and injuring 4 in Bhikhiwind. The CRPF jeep was ambushed in a surprise attack and amongst the killed were 2 constables and 1 company commander. 4others survived, but were in critical condition. Labh Singh called United Press of India and claimed responsibility for the attack.

=== Bank robberies ===
In September 1986 KCF members under Labh Singh robbed a bank in Talwara. The bank manager was killed and ₹29,000 (equivalent to ₹400,000 or US$4,200 in 2026) was stolen.

On 29 September 1986, KCF members under Labh Singh robbed a bank in Tar Taran Sahib. The bank manager was killed.

In October 1986 Labh Singh personally led a bank robbery in Talwara at the State Bank of India. According to police 4 Sikhs robbed the bank and 2 people were killed and another 2 wounded. The robbery occurred in broad daylight. ₹2,000,000 (equivalent to ₹27 million or US$290,000 in 2026) were stolen.

In October 1986 Labh Singh and his fellow militants robbed ₹1,023,000 (equivalent to ₹14 million or US$150,000 in 2026) from a bank in Ludhiana.

In October 1986 Labh Singh and his fellow militants robbed ₹800,000 (equivalent to ₹11 million or US$120,000 in 2026) from the Millar Ganj branch of the Punjab National Bank, Ludhiana.

On 5 May 1987 KCF members under Labh Singh robbed ₹850,000 (equivalent to ₹12 million or US$120,000 in 2026) from the Bank of India branch in Guru Amar Das market.

==== India's biggest bank robbery ====
In February 1987 Labh Singh allegedly masterminded what was at that time the largest bank robbery in Indian history, netting ₹57 million (equivalent to ₹780 million or US$8.3 million in 2026) from the Millar Ganj branch of the Punjab National Bank, Ludhiana; a part of this stolen money belonged to the Reserve Bank of India, India's central bank. It was documented as the "Biggest Bank Robbery" under "Curiosities and wonders" in the Limca Book of Records. The loot enabled the Khalistan Commando Force to buy sophisticated weapons and AK-47 rifles. Sikh militants often used bank robberies to finance their campaign against the Indian government.

The Chicago Sun-Times reported that "12 to 15 Sikhs dressed as policemen and armed with submachine guns and rifles escaped with nearly $4.5 million in the biggest bank robbery in Indian history." "No one was injured." A Police spokesman described it as "a neat and clean operation".

Khalistan Commando Force members who allegedly participated in the robbery included Harjinder Singh Jinda, Mathra Singh, Paramjit Singh Panjwar, Satnam Singh Bawa, Gurnam Singh Bundala, Sukhdev Singh Sukha, Daljit Singh Bittu, Gursharan Singh Gamma and Pritpal Singh.

=== Attacks on alleged police informants ===
On 12 January 1987 Labh Singh claimed responsibility for the killing of Mohinder Kaur, her two daughters, and a house worker for being police informants.

On 21 September 1987 Sulakhan Singh revealed that he had been attacked and left for dead. Sulakhan was a senior priest of the Golden Temple. He had been suspected of being a police informant. KCF members under Labh Singh and Bhindranwale Tiger Force of Khalistan (BTKF) members under Gurbachan Singh Manochahal beat him with iron rods and sharp weapons. He suffered many wounds, but none were life-threatening. Sulakhan denied being a police informant. Sulakhan also had police security.

On 30 March 1988, KCF killed Naranjan Singh in Dilwan for being a police informant.

=== Killing of Communists ===
Communists were targeted by many Sikh militant organizations and leaders. They were especially targeted by Labh Singh who was the mastermind of multiple targeted killings. Jarnail Singh Bhindranwale called them the "arch enemies of the panth,"

- In September 1986 Labh Singh killed Darshan Singh Canadian an MLA and party leader of the Communist Party of India. Darshan Singh opposed Sikh militants and Khalistan supporting NRI Sikhs. He actively campaigned against both.
- In September 1986 KCF members under Labh Singh also killed Baldev Singh Mann. He was a left-wing activist of the Communist Party of India (Marxist–Leninist) New Democracy. He was a state level leader of Kirti Kisan Union and the editor of Hirawal Dasta Baldev was gunned down by 4 men in his home village near Amritsar. He was walking with his brother who escaped unhurt.
- On 16 February 1987, Harjinder Singh Jinda killed Communist Party of India (Marxist) veteran leader and MLA Chanan Singh near Hoshiarpur. In a letter to the media Jinda said that Dhoot committed blasphemy and spoke out against Sikhs.
- On 19 May 1987 Gurdeep Singh Deepa and other KCF members under Labh Singh killed Deepak Dhawan who was the State Committee member of the Communist Party of India (Marxist). Dhawan was riding his scooter near Sanghe. KCF members approached him and told him to try and run. He tried to run, but they shot him as he tried.
- On 22 July 1987 KCF members under Labh Singh entered the farmhouse of Swaran Singh an official and vice president of the Amritsar district of the Communist Party of India. They went to where he slept with his family and opened fire. Swaran Singh, his wife. his mother, and his daughter were all killed in the fire. Swaran Singh's two other daughters were wounded, but his 5-year-old son was unhurt. They also opened fire at the porch killing a worker, and injuring two others. A note was left claiming responsibility and saying it was over Swaran Singh's protests against the Sikh militants and Khalistan.
- Under Labh Singh in 1987 KCF members on motorcycles shot dead Communist Party of India (Marxist) member Dr. Gurdial Singh.
- On 13 March 1988 at Kalchian, 25 kilometres from Amritsar, 4 KCF members stormed the homes of Communist Party of India members. The 2 party members were taken by them and were forced to disclose the location of the village head. After reaching the home of the village leader the 2 party members were killed along with the village leader. The village leader was killed for his support of Rajiv Gandhi and participation in anti Khalistan rallies organised by Gandhi.
- On 17 March 1988 Jaimal Singh Padha was assassinated by KCF members under Labh Singh. He was a leader of the Kirti Kisan Union, a Communist Party of India (Marxist–Leninist) Liberation front. Jaimal had written against religious communalism which angered Sikh militants. In one of his essays, he also spoke against Khalistan.
- On 23 March 1988 Pash, whose real name was Avtar Singh Sandhu, was killed by KCF members under Labh Singh. Pash was a supporter of the "ultra leftist Naxalite movement". He would write in support of communism and was a vocal critic of Sant Jarnail Singh Bhindranwale. Labh Singh is said to have regretted this killing in his diary.

== Death and aftermath ==
In June 1988, the Panthic committee appointed Labh Singh a high priest, but on 12 July 1988 he was killed in an encounter with police near Tanda, Hoshiarpur, Punjab, India. He had a bounty of 100,000 rupees at the time. (Around 1,120,000 rupees in 2023. Around US$14,000 in 2023)

At that time, he was wanted in relation to the murder of a dozen policemen, newspaper editor Ramesh Chander, and an attempt on the former Punjab Police Chief Julio Francis Ribeiro. Amritsar Police Superintendent Suresh Arora said "We have broken the back of the KCF. Sukhdev Singh was the most dreaded of the terrorists."

An 8-page note found on the dead body of Labh Singh had said that militants need to target politicians and officers and not innocent civilians. The not also said, “Achieving Khalistan will be no joke. It will not be a short period simple affair… "We should restrict our targets to political leaders, police officers and their informers and to those staunchly opposed to Khalistan.”

The Tribune of India carried a report of a neighbor's statement that, after his death, many of his family emigrated to Canada, though his father-in-law stayed on in Labh Singh's house. The neighbor further stated that the father-in-law committed suicide after police beat him "mercilessly", and that the house then remained deserted for several years, but that finally it has been taken over by his relatives.

Upon news of Labh Singh's death Gurbachan Singh Manochahal and Wassam Singh Zaffarwal issued statements saying," In the struggle begun by Sant Jarnail Singh Bhindranwale to liberate the Sikh nation, General Bhai Labh Singh sacrificed his life. The bhog ceremony and Akhand Path will take place in his native village Panjwar, near Jhabal, on the 21st. We appeal to all sangats to attend the bhog ceremony in large numbers."

Avtar Singh Brahma and Sukhdev Singh Babbar issued statements saying, "'One who dies in the battlefield is great. One who runs away takes birth again and again.' General Bhai Labh Singh acted on the words 'In the end one has to sacrifice one's life in the battlefield when all other means have failed.' The bhog ceremony and Akhand path will take place in his native village of Panjwar 21 July 1988. We appeal to the Sarbat Khalsa to attend the last Ardas of this brave soldier."

After Labh Singh's death many Ardas and bhogs were done across the globe by Sikh diaspora.

Kanwaljit Singh Sultanwind succeeded Labh Singh as leader of the KCF.

Following Labh Singh's death Gian Surjit Singh, a well known dhadi, wrote and composed a tribute to Labh Singh which sold very well. It was sung in Gurdwaras and Sikh camps for youth all across England. The main verse of the song translated to, “In place of 7 bullets we will blow up 100 bombs. By getting revenge for Labh Singh we will show them.”

The Tribune India reported in July 2006 that a Bhog (Sikh religious ceremony) for Labh Singh was held "in the past few months".

== See also ==
- Khalistan Movement
- List of actions attributed to KCF

== Footnotes ==
| Preceded by Manbir Singh Chaheru | Leader Khalistan Commando Force; 1986–1988 | Succeeded by Kanwarjit Singh Sultanwind |
