= Edgar Ribeiro =

Indian urban planner (1929/1930–2026)

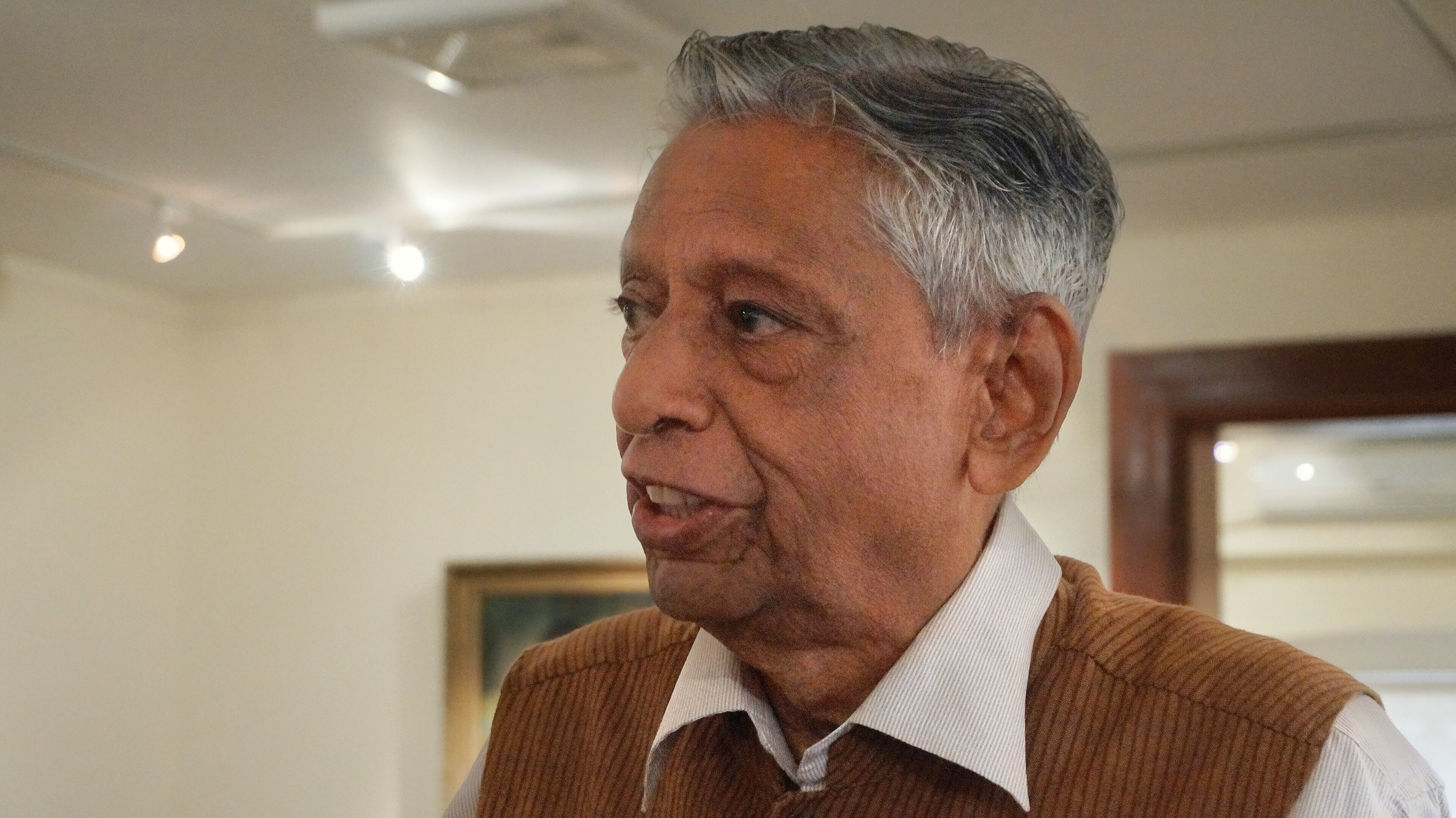
- Ribeiro in 2015
- Born: Edgar F. N. Ribeiro; 1929 or 1930; Poona, British India
- Died: 24 April 2026 (aged 96); Porvorim, Goa, India
- Education: Sir J. J. College of Architecture; University of Manchester
- Occupations: Architect, urban planner, educationist
- Relatives: Julio Ribeiro (brother)

Edgar F. N. Ribeiro (1929/1930 – 24 April 2026) was an Indian architect and urban planner who was the former Chief Town Planner of India and an advisor to the Planning Commission of India. He was also the Director of SPA, New Delhi.

== Early life ==
Edgar F. N. Ribeiro was born in Poona. He studied architecture at Sir J. J. College of Architecture, Bombay, in the 1950s. He then went to the University of Manchester to pursue higher education in the field of town planning.

== Career ==
Ribeiro began his career by working with a municipal borough and a county council within the unitary system of developmental governance of the United Kingdom.

Ribeiro then returned to India in 1962 and joined the Town and Country Planning Organisation (TCPO) of the Government of India.

Between 1964 and 1967, he was responsible for setting up the Town and Country Planning Department for Goa, Daman and Diu. In the early 1970s, he was part of a central ministry responsible for proposing urban design guidelines for the city of New Delhi. Between 1979 and 1983, he served as Commissioner (Planning) at the Delhi Development Authority, as part of which he led efforts for integrated development of transport, services and land use.

He later got promoted to Chief of the TCPO in 1988.

Ribeiro was also the Director of the School of Planning and Architecture, New Delhi, and later became the first Chairman of School of Planning and Architecture, Bhopal. He also served as an Advisor (Spatial Planning) to the Planning Commission of India.

After his retirement, he helped set up the Goenkarancho Ekvott (transl. United Goans), a registered organisation of Goans living in Delhi. As part of their efforts, they realised the flaws in the planning for Goa. In 2009, he was chosen by the Government of Goa to draft the Regional Plan 2021. However, he resigned from the committee within a few months due to disagreements.

== Personal life ==
Edgar Ribeiro was the brother of noted police commissioner Julio Ribeiro. Edgar was married and had two sons and a daughter.

== Death ==
Ribeiro died in Porvorim, Goa, on 24 April 2026, at the age of 96. The funeral was held at the Our Lady of Perpetual Succour Church, Socorro, on 27 April.
