= Gurbachan Singh Manochahal =

Sikh leader (1954–1993)

Baba Gurbachan Singh Manochahal

Jathedar of the Akal Takht
- In office 24 June 1988 – 5 February 1993
- Appointed by: Sarbat Khalsa

Acting Jathedar of the Akal Takht
- In office 27 April 1986 – 26 January 1987
- Preceded by: Gurdev Singh Kaunke
- Succeeded by: Gurdev Singh Kaunke

1st Jathedar of Bhindranwale Tiger Force of Khalistan
- In office 1984–1993
- Preceded by: Position Established
- Succeeded by: Balwinder Singh

Personal details
- Born: Gurbachan Singh; 6 June 1954 Manochahal, Tarn Taran, Panjab
- Died: 28 February 1993 (aged 38) Rataul, Tarn Taran, Panjab
- Known for: Founder of Bhindranwale Tiger Force of Khalistan

Gurbachan Singh Manochahal (6 June 1954 – 28 February 1993) was a Sikh militant, and Jathedar of Akal Takhat Sahib. After being ousted from the Committee he would form his own Panthic Committee and the Bhindranwale Tiger Force of Khalistan in 1987. Manochahal was responsible for over 2,000 killings by the time of his death.

== Early life ==
Gurbachan Singh was born on 6 June 1954 in a Sikh family of village Manochahal, Tarn Taran district in the Indian state of Punjab to S. Atma Singh and Gurmej Kaur. He served in the Indian Army during his youth.

Manochahal was shot in the arm during the 1978 Sikh–Nirankari clashes. After this incident, he had maintained a relationship with Damdami Taksal and became acquainted with other members of the organization, such as Amrik Singh and Jarnail Singh Bhindranwale. He soon became a close aid and associate of Jarnail Singh Bhindranwale. In 1982 he aided Bhindranwale in escaping form Bombay and was later authorized by Bhindranwale to leave the Golden Temple during Operation Bluestar.

== Insurgency ==
=== Early Insurgency ===
On November 11, 1985 Manochahal was surrounded in his home, at his home in the village of Manochahal, by a group of 20 officers led by the head of Punjab Police operations, Superintendent of Police M.M. Seti. The police had surrounded Manochahal based on a tip from an informant. Manochahal opened fire on the police killing 1 officer on the spot. Police said, Seti and the remaining 19 officers fled from the scene dropping their weapons. Manochahal collected their weapons and left the scene. Seti and all officers involved faced ridicule for fleeing the scene.

Manochahal was said to be the head of kharkus by police in the end of 1985. He would appoint specific militants to lead all other militants in specific districts. He appointed Dhana Singh to lead Gurdaspur, Manbir Singh to lead Jalandhar, and Jarnail Singh Halwara, the killer of Harcharand Singh Logowal, to lead Ludhiana and Patiala.

Manochahal returned to the Golden Temple on 26 January 1986 to take part in the Sarbat Khalsa ceremony. 8 resolutions were passed by the Sarbat Khalsa including the dissolving of the SGPC and the creation of a 5 member Panthic Committee that would make decisions on behalf of all Sikhs. Manochahal was a member of the Panthic Committee. On 29 April the Panthic Committee officially declared Khalistan in a press conference from the Golden Temple, despite lack of support form other Sikh groups. This decision sent shockwaves across India and led to Rajiv Gandhi ordering Operation Black Thunder to raid the Golden Temple. Manochahal escaped before the raid.

He was appointed Jathedar of Akal Takht in April 1986 and resigned from the post in January 1987 in the “larger interest of the panth”.

=== Bhindranwale Tiger Force of Khalistan ===
In April 1987 Manochahal was removed from the Panthic Committee. Manochahal formed Bhindranwale Tiger Force of Khalistan (BTFK), a new militant group led by him, further factionalizing the militants. The reason for Manchohal's removal was claimed to be for alleged looting, extortion, killing of innocents, and misuse of funds by him. Although according to Pettigrew, the real reason was internal differences.

On June 14, 1987, BTFK claimed responsibility for the killing of 12 and injuring 20 in Delhi in a shooting. BTFK said, “'Killings squads have reached (New) Delhi and they will take revenge for the November 1984 anti-Sikh riots.” On July 30, 1987, BTKF claimed responsibility for an attack on Hans Raj Sethi, a BJP representative on the New Delhi City Council. He was shot dead with 6 bullets. He was considered a “father figure” for the BJP and RSS in Delhi. They next walked up to Sudarshan Munjal, a BJP member, in his driveway and killed him. Surjit Singh Penta carried out the killings.

On November 5, 1987, Manochahal and Buta Singh was surrounded by CRPF officers in Shamerpur in Tarn Taran district. An encounter took place in which Manochahal managed to break the police lines and escape while his accomplice Buta Singh died.

On June 23, 1988, Manochahal was appointed as official Jathedar of Akal Takht. He will hold the position until February 5, 1993.

On the morning of June 25, 1989 KLF and BTFK members attacked Rashtriya Swayamsevak Sangh (RSS) members at their meeting at Nehru Park in Moga. 21 RSS members were killed with a police officer, a paramilitary home guard and a couple dying of a bomb blast after the shooting leaving a total of 25 dead and 31-35 injured. It has since been renamed to Shahidi Park meaning Martyr Park. According to police Sikhs opened fire with automatic weapons from a van killing 21 and injuring many. According to survivors bullets were sprayed on everyone. They then left the scene. Soon after a powerful bomb blast occurred which killed 4, injured more, and caused damage. A second bomb also blew up after, but it caused no damage or injuries. A curfew was announced immediately following the incident.

On March 2, 1990, KCF faction chief Gurjant Singh Rajasthani and BTFK chief Gurbachan Singh Manochahal claimed responsibility for killing Amritsar Jail Superintendent Pyara Lal. They claimed he tortured Sikhs in prison.

In 1990, Sukhwinder Singh Sangha split from Manochahal's BTFK and formed his own faction. In April 1990 Manochahal with his BTFK, Khalistan Commando Force (Rajasthani), and Dashmesh Regiment (Matthewal) formed an alliance and created their own Panthic Committee.

=== Rataul Encounter ===
On May 6, 1991, Deputy Superintendent of Police Sukhdev Singh began a massive search operation across suspected location in Tarn Taran district. On May 7, at roughly 5 PM, the search operation reach Ratual where Manochahal was in a bunker along with 7 other militants of BTFK. Manochahal and his fellow militants opened fire on the police search party killing a constable and injuring DSP Sukhdev Singh. Subsequently, Senior Superintended of Police Narendra Pal Singh, chief of Tarn Taran district, and Deputy Inspector General Ajit Singh, chief of police forces across the border range, personally arrived on the scene with a large force of reinforcements. In the ensuing fire battle SSP Narendra Pal Singh, DIG Ajit Singh, and a constable were injured with Ajit Singh dying of his wounds.

The encounter continued with more police and paramilitary officers arriving from the CRPF led by DIG Dhanpat Yadev. By 11 PM the Indian Army arrived and police and paramilitary forces withdrew from the area, giving the army full control of the operation. The arm deployed light-machine guns, medium machine guns, tear gas, mortars, sniper rifles, and RPG-7 rockets against Mancohahal and his fellow militants. Bulletproof tractors were also used. An army major and two soldiers were killed in the continued fighting. the encounter ended after 40 hours on May 8 with 1,000 security personnel taking part. 7 militants were killed with Manochahal and others having managed to escape. 5 security personnel were killed with 7 others injured. Rataul had been equipped with multiple underground bunkers and fortified positions on the roofs of multiple buildings.

=== Later Insurgency ===
In 1992, a separate Panthic committee headed by Dr. Sohan Singh was formed. It called for the boycott of the 1992 Punjab Legislative Assembly election. Manochahal argued that the militants should contest in the election. He said that it was the only time to get Khalistan and it was now or never. His demands for an election led others calling him a government puppet. He decided not to contest after Sikh leaders kept calling for a boycott. The formation of this committee undermined the influence of Manochahal who was criticized for his support for political participation and led to a divide between the armed groups within Punjab. Elections resulted in a Congress Government under Beant Singh of the Congress Party.

Per Maloy Krishna Dhar, a former Joint Director, Intelligence Bureau, India, he was given the task to negotiate with Gurbachan Singh Manochahal. He contacted Manochahal through a journalist source, was blindfolded and taken a few hundred kilometres from Amritsar to meet with him where he secretly held negotiations for three hours before he was blindfolded again and transported back.

== Death ==
Manochahal had been barred from entering Pakistan since 1990 due to his fallout with Wassna Singh Zaffarwal, who was operating from Punjab, Pakistan. He spent the next 3 years constantly fleeing, hiding, and fighting encounters. Manochahal carried a bounty of ₹3,000,000 on his head by the time of his death.

Manochahal escaped from the police's dragnet on 27 February in Bagrian village. The police cornered him in the nearby Rataul village the following day. The encounter began at 3:45 PM when Police search team were fired upon by Manochahal and others. The Police search team requested immediate assistance. Soon 2 quick reaction teams led by 2 different Majors and the Commanding officer of the Rashtriya Rifles, Colonel arrived. So did many other senior officers. In 30 minutes over 225 army and police personnel began to cordon the area. After defending himself for an hour with a machine gun, he was killed. The chief of the Punjab Police, Kanwar Pal Singh Gill later proclaimed, "Now I can say that we have finished militancy in Punjab." An AK-47, double barrel gun, and two remote controlled bombs were recovered from Manochahal. Manochahal was responsible for over 2,000 killings by the time of his death.

Following Manochahal's death 101 militants surrendered to the police including 6 "A class" militants who were amongst the most wanted,

== Views ==
When asked about the size of the Sikh state he fights for Manochahal answered with, “Due to the foolishness of our leaders, the area over which the Sikhs once ruled has been allowed to shrink… What we do have in mind is the rule of Khalsa over the Delhi Takht because our war is against the Brahmin-Bania combine, which will not budge an inch without a struggle. We shall fight to the end.”

When asked about whether he was willing to negotiate for something less than Khalistan Manochahal answered with, “Nothing short of Khalsa raj will be acceptable now. We shall negotiate only if Khalistan is on the agenda.”

When asked what will happen to Sikhs outside lf Punjab and Hindus in Punjab Manochahal answered with, “Sikhs outside Punjab have been oblivious of our problems. Now I suggest that they set up a base in Punjab. It will be pragmatic, for some day they will have to shift here. We are not keen to expel or drive out Hindus from Punjab but they will have to reconcile to the existence of Khalistan.”

Manochahal also pledged to die and not be arrested. Saying, “There is no going back now. My promise to the Waheguru is that I shall never be caught alive."

== Bibliography ==
- Van Dyke, Virginia (2009), "The Khalistan Movement in Punjab, India, and the Post-Militancy Era: Structural Change and New Political Compulsions", Asian Survey, 49 (6): 975–997, doi:10.1525/as.2009.49.6.975
