= Kaunke Kalan =

Village in Punjab, India

Coordinates: 30°45′55″N 75°24′56″E

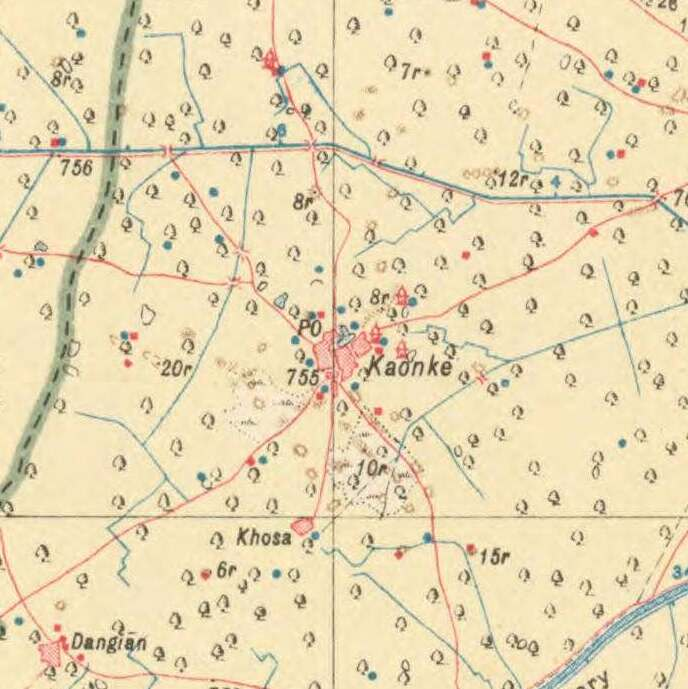
Kaunke Kalan village in Jagraon tehsil of Ludhiana district, Survey of India geographical block-map for 44 N NW Ferozepore (1921)

Kaunke Kalan, also spelt as Kaonke Kalan, also known simply as Kaunke or Kaonke, is a village in the Jagraon region of western Ludhiana district in Punjab, India. It is located 7 km southwest of Jagraon town.

== History ==
The village was visited by Guru Hargobind in 1631–32, who headed to Mahron village afterwards, with a shrine called Gurdwārā Gurūsar commemorating the guru's stay in the northwest area of the village's boundary. The shrine was renovated in 1912 and 1955. The 1912 renovation was assisted by Mai Kishan Kaur (1860–1952). During the Jaito agitation of 1923–24, police interrupted an akhand path happening at Gurdwara Gurusar and prevented those inside the shrine from leaving. A Sikh jatha dispatched from the nearby village of Rode led by Dullā Siṅgh and Suchchā Siṅgh, known as the Durli Jatha, managed to bring supplies to those stuck inside.
