= Garha, Phillaur =

Garha
- Village
- Location in Punjab, India Garha (India)
- Coordinates: 31.0233791°N 75.7927116°E
- Country: India
- State: Punjab
- District: Jalandhar
- Tehsil: Phillaur

Government
  - Type: Panchayat raj
  - Body: Gram panchayat
- Elevation: 246 m (807 ft)

Population (2011)
  - Total: 2,869
- Sex ratio 1565/1304 ♂/♀

Languages
  - Official: Punjabi
- Time zone: UTC+5:30 (IST)
- Telephone code: 01826
- ISO 3166 code: IN-PB
- Vehicle registration: PB 37
- Website: jalandhar.nic.in

Garha is a large village in Phillaur tehsil of Jalandhar District of Punjab State, India. It is situated on Phillaur-Nawanshahr road 1 km away from Phillaur, 45 km from Jalandhar and 120 km from state capital Chandigarh. The village is administrated by a sarpanch who is an elected representative of village as per Panchayati raj (India).

== Caste ==
The village has schedule caste (SC) constitutes 68.63% of total population of the village and it doesn't have any Schedule Tribe (ST) population.

== Transport ==
=== Rail ===
Phillaur Junction is the nearest train station; however, Bhatian Railway Station is 9 km away from the village.

=== Air ===
The nearest domestic airport is located 33 km away in Ludhiana and the nearest international airport is located in Chandigarh also Sri Guru Ram Dass Jee International Airport is the second nearest airport which is 140 km away in Amritsar.
