= Bhindranwale Tiger Force of Khalistan =

Militant organization

- Letterhead logo of the BTFK
- Leaders: Gurbachan Singh Manochahal (1987–1993); Sukhwinder Singh Sangha (1990); Rashpal Singh Chhandran (1990–1992); Balwinder Singh (1993) Rattandeep Singh (1993–1990s)
- Dates active: 1987–1990s
- Active regions: India
- Ideology: Sikh nationalism
- Status: Defunct

The Bhindranwale Tiger Force of Khalistan (BTFK) is a pro-Khalistan militant organization and was one of several major separatist organizations in the Khalistan movement during the insurgency in Punjab, India. The BTFK's main aim was to establish a Sikh homeland called Khalistan. At its peak, the BTFK's membership totaled 500 members and remained the strongest pro-Khalistan group in Tarn Taran Sahib, which was the epicenter of violence during the Punjab insurgency.

It was formed in 1987 by Gurbachan Singh Manochahal. In 1990, it split into two factions under the leadership of Sukhwinder Singh Sangha and Manochahal. After Manochahal's death, the BTFK seem to have disbanded or splintered into factions. It was listed in 1995 as one of the four "major militant groups" in the Khalistan movement.

== History ==
Bhindranwale Tiger Force of Khalistan had two main factions, one led by Gurbachan Singh Manochahal and the other faction led by Sukhwinder Singh Sangha.

The BTF was a Sikh group fighting for an independent Sikh homeland. Based in the state of Punjab, India, the BTF was described as one of the major Sikh revolutionary groups and reportedly the strongest revolutionary group in the Amritsar-Tarn Taran area.

According to Cynthia Keppley Mahmood, who previously was a professor in Anthropology at University of Maine in Orono with expertise on Sikh revolutionary groups in Punjab, the BTF was founded in 1984 by Gurbachan Singh Manochahal, who was also head of the original Panthic Committee (30 December 1994). Manochal broke away from the original Panthic Committee to continue his independent command of the BTF after his leadership of the Panthic was challenged in 1988. Manochal also maintained his own Panthic Committee for a while but was killed in 1991 or 1992. Keppley Mahmood also indicated that membership of the BTF numbered in the hundreds at one point, and the BTF was considered among the most dangerous of the guerilla forces (30 December 1994). Keppley Mahmood noted that "relations" of suspected members were targeted by police and paramilitary personnel and much of the original force had been decimated. Furthermore, Keppley Mahmood suggests that members of the BTF were scattered all over, but no one knows how many are left or whether there is a clear leader at this point. Keppley Mahmood was unable to comment on the treatment of members of the BTF by the authorities upon their return to India, but noted that since the BTF has been a major target of counter-terrorism efforts, she would expect the reception of any known member to be "drastic".

In the year 1991, Bhindranwale Tiger Force of Khalistan along with Khalistan Liberation Force and Dr. Sohan Singh (Head of Panthic Committee) etc. participated in the secret peace negotiations with India in the city of Ludhiana. These meetings were initiated by Union Minister of State for Home Subodh Kant Sahay on the orders of the then Prime Minister of India Chandra Shekhar. It is said that this peace effort was sabotaged by Pakistan's Inter Services Intelligence. Former Indian Intelligence Bureau Joint Director, Maloy Krishna Dhar stated in a press report published by The Hindu, that "Prime Minister Benazir Bhutto and her ISI advisers were determined not to let peace succeed. Pakistan's covert war in Jammu and Kashmir had exploded in 1990, and its establishment understood that the Punjab conflict tied down our troops, and threatened our logistical lines into Jammu and Kashmir."

Gurbachan Singh Manochahal was killed by the police on 1 March 1993. According to a 30 March 1993 UPI report, Balwinder Singh was appointed as BTF chief after Manochahal's death.

Bhindranwala Tigers Force of Khalistan was found to be active in state of Punjab in the year of 1997.

Ranjit Singh Gill alias Kuki was a Bhindranwale Tiger Force of Khalistan member.

India arrested some of the Bhindranwala Tigers Force of Khalistan members in the year of 1999 as well.

== Notable Activities ==
1. On 11 November 1985, Police and CRPF surrounded the hut where Gurbachan Singh Manochahal, head of BTFK, was staying. It is said the security forces kept their distance out of fear. Manochahal told police he needed a flashlight to open the lock of the door. Police slid a flashlight under the crack of the door. Manochahal opened the door and went charging out with his brother both holding assault rifles. The officers retreated after suffering heavy casualties.
2. On 14 June 1987, BTFK claimed responsibility for the killing of 12 and injuring 20 in Delhi in a shooting. BTFK said, "'Killings squads have reached (New) Delhi and they will take revenge for the November 1984 anti-Sikh riots." Surjit Singh Penta carried out the killings.
3. On 30 July 1987, BTKF claimed responsibility for an attack on Hans Raj Sethi, a BJP representative on the New Delhi City Council. He was shot dead with 6 bullets. He was considered a "father figure" for the BJP and RSS in Delhi. They next walked up to Sudarshan Munjal, a BJP member, in his driveway and killed him. Surjit Singh Penta carried out the killings.
4. Sukhwinder Singh Sangha claimed responsibility for killing 4 and injuring 4 on 28 May 1988, in Hoshiarpur for celebrating Operation Black Thunder.
5. Sukhwinder Singh Sangha claimed responsibility for killing 1 Nirankari in Phagwara.
6. Sukhwinder Singh Sangha claimed responsibility for killing 3 and injuring 2 people in 2 separate incidents for alleged blasphemy and anti-Sikh acts.
7. On 1 January 1989, BTFK Lieutenant General Satnam Singh claimed responsibility for killing 3 people and destroying 4 CRPF vehicles in Avan.
8. On 8 April 1989, Sukhwinder Singh Sangha claimed responsibility for killing 6 police informants of one family.
9. On 24 June 1989, Superintendent of Police (Operations) Avtar Singh Chhetra was killed in an encounter with 5 BTFK militants in Tarn Taran. The encounter was described as fierce and continued for many hours. Multiple officers died in it as well. All the militants were also killed. Chhetra had been accused of torturing militants.
10. On the morning of 25 June 1989 KLF and BTFK members attacked Rashtriya Swayamsevak Sangh (RSS) members at their meeting at Nehru Park in Moga. 21 RSS members were killed with a police officer, a paramilitary home guard and a couple dying of a bomb blast after the shooting leaving a total of 25 dead and 31-35 injured. It has since been renamed to Shahidi Park meaning Martyr Park. According to police Sikhs opened fire with automatic weapons from a van killing 21 and injuring many. According to survivors bullets were sprayed on everyone. They then left the scene. Soon after a powerful bomb blast occurred which killed 4, injured more, and caused damage. A second bomb also blew up after, but it caused no damage or injuries. A curfew was announced immediately following the incident.
11. On 28 December 1989, Sukhwinder Singh Sangha and fellow BTFK militants attacked a CRPF patrol and killed 4 jawans.
12. On 6 February 1990, Sukhwinder Singh Sangha killed 2 Punjab Police officers in Jagatpur and stole their weapons. Sangha said in a statement to the media that they have set up a checkpoint in Jagatpur and will stop all officers attempting to cross.
13. On 16 February 1990, KCF, BTFK (Sangha), BKI, and SSF collectively claimed responsibility for an explosion in Phillaur that killed Inspector Harcharan Singh Soori and Assistant Sub-Inspector Ram Moorti on the 11th. The bomb also wounded 2 Sergeants. The explosion happened in an armoured and guarded police training facility. Both were put in a special armoured room for extra safety, but were killed at 9 pm from an explosion within their room. Both officers had been accused of torturing Sikhs. Inspector Soori had survived a previous assassination attempt in 1988.
14. On 2 March 1990, KCF faction chief Gurjant Singh Rajasthani and BTFK chief Gurbachan Singh Manochahal claimed responsibility for killing Amritsar Jail Superintendent Pyara Lal. They claimed he tortured Sikhs in prison.
15. On 16 March 1990, BTFK and KCF claimed responsibility for destroying 2 police vehicles, killing 4 home guards, and inuring 2 home guards near Riaa. They also warned officers in nearby villages and cities to leave their jobs in 10 days or meet a similar fate.
16. On 6 April 1990, Sukhwinder Singh Sangha claimed responsibility for killing 5 BSF soldiers near Hoshiarpur.
17. On 14 April 1990, BTFK Lieutenant General Waryam Singh Boore Nangal claimed responsibility for killing one Assistant Sub-Inspector and taking his revolver near Batala.
18. On 20 April 1990, Satnam Singh Satta Cheena and Sukhwinder Singh Sangha claimed responsibility for killing Communist leader Hardev Singh.
19. On 27 April 1990, Sukhwinder Singh Sangha claimed responsibility for the Sarpanch of Bibi Pur, Ram Lal. Sangha said that he had joined Congress and for that was killed.
20. On 25 May 1990, Sukhwinder Singh Sangha claimed responsibility for killing Communist leader Kartar Chand near Nurpur Thana.
21. On 25 May 1990, Sukhwinder Singh Sangha claimed responsibility for killing a soldier named Bhag Singh in Uaid. Sangha claimed Bhag Singh was a rapists and thus killed as punishment.
22. On 31 August 1990, Sukhwindwer Singh Sangha claimed responsibility for killing a police constable.
23. On 31 August 1990, Sukhwindwer Singh Sangha claimed responsibility for destroying BSF jeeps and killing BSF near Nakodar.
24. On 31 August 1990, Sukhwindwer Singh Sangha claimed responsibility for killing a looter.
25. On 31 August 1990, Ranbir Singh, Lieutenant General of BTFK, claimed responsibility for capturing a police station in Majha and killing 6 police officers and injuring 5 officers in the capture.
26. On 3 November 1990, Sukhwinder Singh Sangha, Bikramjit Singh Nalra, Baljit Singh Khela, Manjit Singh, and Resham Singh Patiala were killed in a bloody battle in Bhullar. Over 20,000 CRPF, BSF, Police and other security personnel had surrounded the village. After many hours of battle Sangha and his associates were killed. According to Ajit thousands of security personnel were killed. At the time Sangha had a 2.2 million rupee reward on his head.
27. On 24 November 1990, at 9 am BTFK along with other militant groups part of the Sohan Singh Committee killed Superintendent of Police (Operations) Harjit Singh in a bomb blast at Tarn Taran. Sikh militants had been studying Harjit's travel routes for some time. A remote-controlled bomb had been placed on a road Harjit usually drove by to go to the doctor. When Harjit's lead security vehicles drove by and it was just his vehicle over the bomb it was detonated. In the explosion three of his security guards were killed and his vehicle was destroyed. Harjit's limbs were found over 100 meters away from the location of the explosion. A permanent curfew was put on the town after. A saying about the incident is, "He had a security vehicle in front of him and behind him, so he would be safe from all sides. But he didn’t count on his death coming from below". Twenty-two days prior to his death Harjit had killed the chief of BTFK (S) Sukhwinder Singh Sangha along with four other militants. KLF, KCF, Babbar Khalsa, SSF, and BTFK (S) members held a meeting afterward pledging to kill Harjit within 31 days of Sangha's death. Major Singh of KCF was given the lead role in the killing. A famous kavishri ballad about this incident says, "24 November at exactly 9, for Sangha’s revenge Major Singh and his allies have arrived. Without wasting any time Kharkus have come to kill him… The 5 jathebandis [Groups] had said we would hit him hard… To become SSP he had done many misdeeds… Watch how with a computer system [remote-controlled bomb] Kharkus blow him up. Harjit’s wife watches his limbs blow up… Operation Shera has been done on the SP of Operation."
28. On 6 June 1991, BTFK member Dilsher Singh Shera killed Brij Bhushan Mehra, Punjab legislative speaker for 4 years and a senior Congress leader, in Amritsar as he travelled by car under security. His driver was killed and gunmen seriously injured.
29. On 7 June 1991, BTFK (Sangha), KLF, KCF (Panjwar), and SSF claimed responsibility for an assassination attempt on India's Home Minister Subodh Kant Sahay in Ludhiana. Kharkus made a bomb attack on his convoy. Sahay’s bulletproof vehicle flipped over, but he escaped with minor wounds. His driver and 1 bodyguard were seriously wounded.
30. On 9 October 1991, Superintendent of Police (Headquarters) Joginder Singh Kherawas killed by KLF and BTFK. Khera was ambushed in Ropar. Khera was one of the leading officers in the Punjab Police force. He was killed with nine commandos.
31. On 3 July 1992, BTFK Sangha members Jasmer Singh Lalli and Jaspal Singh Pal claimed responsibility for killing 4 police officers including 1 Head Constable near Panjkotla. They also injured a Superintendent of Police (SP) and 8 other officers.
32. On 3 July 1992, BTFK Sangha members Jasmer Singh Lalli and Jaspal Singh Pal claimed responsibility for killing 2 Indian Army soldiers and wounding 1 near Sanghol.
33. On 3 July 1992, BTFK Sangha members Jasmer Singh Lalli and Jaspal Singh Pal claimed responsibility for killing 1 Indian Army soldier near Kalewal.
34. On 30 October 1992, BTFK Sangha faction chief Satnam Singh Cheena claimed responsibility for killing 2 CRPF Jawans and injuring 3 in Davinda, Hosiarpur.
35. On 30 October 1992, BTFK Sangha chieg Satnam Singh Cheena claimed responsibility for a firing on a police station in Maehtithana.
36. On 30 October 1992, Satnam Singh Cheena claimed responsibility for killing an owner of a liquor shop.
37. On 28 February 1993, Gurbachan Singh Manochahal was killed in an encounter. The encounter began at 3:45 PM when DSP (Deputy Superintendent of Police) Dlibagh Singh and his men were fired upon by Manochahal and others. Dlibagh requested immediate assistance. Soon 2 quick reaction teams led by 2 different Majors and the Commanding officer of the Rashtriya Rifles, Colonel H.C Sah, arrived. So did many other senior officers. In 30 minutes over 225 army and police personnel began to cordon the area. After defending himself for an hour with a machine gun, he was killed. The chief of the Punjab Police, Kanwar Pal Singh Gill later proclaimed, "Now I can say that we have finished militancy in Punjab."
38. A letter purporting to be from the BTFK claimed responsibility for a bomb blast in Jalandhar in September 2018.

== See also ==
- Khalistan Movement
- Kharku
