= Manbir Singh Chaheru =

Indian Khalistan Commando Force leader (1959-1987)

Bhai Manbir Singh Chaheru

1st Jathedar of Khalistan Commando Force
- In office February 1986 - August 1986
- Preceded by: Position Established
- Succeeded by: General Labh Singh

Personal details
- Born: 1959 Village Chaheru, Kapurthala, Panjab, India
- Died: December 1987 (aged 27–28) Punjab, India
- Cause of death: Encounter by police
- Known for: Founding KCF: Day-light attack on District Courts in Jalandhar, Punjab where six to eight policemen were killed. Freed Labh Singh, Sawarnjit Singh and Gurinder Singh Bhola from police custody.
- Nickname: Hari Singh

Military service
- Years of service: 1984–1986
- Rank: General

Bhai Manbir Singh Chaheru (1959 – December 1987), also known as General Hari Singh was a Sikh separatist, and the first leader of the Khalistan Commando Force.

== Early life ==
Singh was born in 1959 in the village of Chaheru to a Badwal Saini Sikh family, Kapurthala, Punjab. His father, Mohinder Singh Badwal, was a farmer.

Manbir Singh completed his primary education from his village school. He then moved to the home of his maternal aunt Niranjan Kaur, in the village of Kala Bakra, for his secondary education. After passing his matriculation exams, he assisted his father in agriculture for six years. He later married Ranjit Kaur.

== Baptism and religious inclination ==
The Nirankari-Sikh clash in 1978 affected Manbir Singh. A retired army officer Giani Joginder Singh who was also son-in-law of Mabir Singh's aunt Niranjan Kaur, encouraged him to get baptised (a Sikh initiation ceremony). In 1979, Mabir Singh along with his wife and his father's younger brother, Karnail Singh, took the baptism from Sant Nihal Singh Harian Wela Wale at the Sodal Gurdwara in district of Jalandhar, Punjab.

He came in contact with Bhai Mohkam Singh, Bhai Gurbant Singh, Bhai Prem Singh and Jarnail Singh Bhindranwale while attending religious classes of Damdami Taksal at the Gurdwara Gurdarshan Parkash, Mehta Chownk, district Amritsar, Punjab.

== Association with Jarnail Singh Bhindranwale ==
In 1981, Chaheru was arrested temporarily because of his heated arguments with a Senior Superintendent of Police of Jalandhar, Gur Iqbal Singh Bhular, when Bhular questioned Chaheru about his actions. Chaheru's uncle, Karnail Singh, got him released on bail with a personal surety that Manbir Singh would appear at Police station the next day. After this incident, Manvir Singh approached Jarnail Singh Bhindranwale and moved to the Golden Temple (Harmandir Sahib) complex where he served food in the Sikh free kitchen (Guru ka Langar). Chaheru became Bhindranwale's personal bodyguard. Police arrested his uncle Karnail Singh for Manbir Singh's failure to appear at the police station per his assurance.

In the Golden Temple complex, Manbir Singh stayed in room number 53 of Guru Nanak Niwas along with Giani Joginder Singh, Malagar Singh Babbar, Singh and Gurtej Singh. He came in contact with Major Singh Nagoke who fought against Indian forces during Operation Blue Star, Sukhdev Singh Sukha of village Fatu Dinga, Balwinder Singh Khojkipur, Joginder Singh Rode and Kabal Singh.

On 18 June 1983, Chaheru and an associate shot dead chief of Criminal Investigation Agency Phagwara Inspector Rattan Chand Sharda in his office. At 10:30 AM Chaheru walked into Sharda’s office and shot him 12 times as he sat in his chair. Sharda was involved in the police firing at Rasta Roko Morcha. At Kup Kalan near Malerkotla, where Rasta Roko Morcha protesters were, security forces and paramilitary forces opened "indiscriminate and unprovoked" fire which resulted in the death of 24 or 26 protesters and the burning of shops and tractors. Around 1,000 protestors were jailed and around 500 protestors and police were also wounded.

Manbir in October 1983 donated blood to Makhan Singh who had been injured in an attack of Deputy Superintendent of Police (DSP) Bachan Singh.

On 14 April 1984 Surinder Singh Sodhi, one of Chaheru’s closest friends and the “right-arm” of Jarnail Singh Bhindranwale, was killed while drinking tea in a shop in Amritsar. Sodhi was killed by a men and a women. The women, Baljit Kaur, would go to the Golden Temple after the killing and confessed to the murder. Baljit Kaur would be interrogated by Bhindranwale. She would admit to the other killer being her boyfriend Surinder Singh Shinda and to being paid by Gurcharan Singh, the general secretary of Akali Dal, to do the killing. She also implicated others. Bhindranwale vowed to avenge the killing. With this Chaheru and fellow militants made their way to punish who they deemed the culprits. Chaheru and others killed Surinder Singh Shinda. He was chopped into 7 pieces for shooting Sodhi 7 times. He was killed within 24 hours of Bhindranwale vowing vengeance.

Giani Joginder Singh, a relative of Manvir Singh Chaheru, died while leading a band of Sikhs in fighting Indian army at the main entrance of Golden Temple during Operation Bluestar. Giani Joginder Singh's daughter later married Jarnail Singh Bhindranwale's son Inderjit Singh.

== Khalistan Commando Force ==
=== Creation ===
Mabir Singh Chaheru was not inside Sri Harmandir Sahib (The Golden Temple) during Operation Blue Star in 1984. After the attack, he fled to Pakistan, but returned to avenge the attack and to achieve independence for Khalistan. He and others, including Harjinder Singh Jinda, Sukhdev Singh Sukha, Gurdev Singh Debu, Khalistan Commando Force was founded by the Sarbat Khalsa and Panthic Committee. It was the official army of Khalistan. Manbir Singh Chaheru was made the first leader in February 1986.

Mabir Singh set up the KCF military hierarchy, but ad hoc groups conducted most operations at the local level. Mabir Singh led the resistance in Doaba.

He participated in several encounters against Indian security forces.

=== Early attacks ===
On 6 March 1986, according to police Manbir Singh’s planned attack on Kabul Singh, acting president of Shiromani Gurdwara Parbandhak Committee (SGPC), was carried out in Kapurthala. The attack killed 7 and injured 13. It was carried out by KCF members. According to police 6 men in a jeep opened fire on the escort of Kabul Singh and a policeman. Kabul Singh managed to survive, but was seriously wounded. According to other sources the real target was Deputy Superintendent of Police (DSP) Jarnail Singh Brar and that Kabul Singh was caught in the crossfire. The KCF members used stenguns. This attack was condemned by the Panthic Committee and the All India Sikh Student Federation (AISSF).

On 7 March 1986, Manbir Singh and co burned the home of police Inspector Jaskirit Singh in Kassochal.

On 26 March 1986, KCF members killed Arjan Singh Mastana an MLA and leader of Communist Party of India.

On 29 March 1986, Manbir Singh and co were allegedly responsible (According to Surjit Singh Barnala) for an attack in Nakodar killing 12. They shot at a brick kiln and a nearby barber shop.

=== Jalandhar court attack ===
6 officers were killed, and more injured, in a violent attack on the District court in Jalandhar, Punjab, India which broke free Labh Singh, and others. Accounts of the attack, reported on 6 April 1986 in the US, differed. The attack was done by Chaheru and fellow associates.

The Courier of Arizona, US, carried a story attributed to UPI stating that 3 "Sikh terrorists" killed 3 police officers who were taking 3 prisoners to a bathroom, while "16 armed court guards cowered in fear". The report stated that 2 police holding a 4th prisoner were also gunned down, and that "Three other officers, a lawyer, and a bystander were wounded as the Sikhs sprayed the area for 15 minutes." Police said that the guards were too frightened to return fire. This fourth suspect remained in custody. Finally, the Courier article reported that the Sikhs looted "three rifles and a submachine gun" from the dead bodies, and that a 6th officer later succumbed to wounds from the attack.

The Wilmington Morning Star carried an AP story, and related that 3 "Sikh extremists" killed 4 police officers inside the District Court complex, killed two officers who "were shot at the courtyard gate as the attackers fled", and wounded 4 other individuals, including a lawyer. The Star identified the freed suspects as Labh Singh, Gurinder Singh, and Swaranjit Singh, who were to appear in court on charges of slaying Ramesh Chander, a Hindu newspaper editor. The Star reported that District Magistrate S.C. Aggarwal said 4 attackers fired over a compound wall from a lane. It further reported that others witnessed the attackers open fire from close range as police led the prisoners to the toilet. The report concluded with District Police Chief Baljit Singh Sandhu's statement that the attackers hard "fired at least 50 rounds" in the attack.

The Eugene Register-Guardian reported that District Magistrate S.C. Aggarwal said in a telephone interview that 3 or more attackers opened fire as 4 defendants accused of the May 1984 slaying of Ramesh Chander, were being led into the compound, and that the attackers took 3 rifles from the slain police.

The Associated Press reported District Magistrate S.C. Aggarwal said in a telephone interview Sikh militants had killed 6 police officers and wounded 4 including a lawyer in an attack on the District Court in Jalandhar. They freed 3 prisoners accused of killing.

This single incident became a basis of Roberio's "Bullet for bullet" policy.

According to an account from a former militant in 1986 Chaheru and Balbir Singh Raipur planned to release Labh Singh and Sawarnjit Singh from police custody as they were to appear in court on charges of slaying Ramesh Chander, a Hindu newspaper editor. One Balbir Singh arranged a car and one Jarnail Singh arranged a jeep as a getaway vehicle. They planned to free both Sukhdev Singh and Sawarnjit Singh from the district courts in Jalandhar when the prisoners arrived for their monthly hearings. Chaheru, Ajitpal Singh, Balbir Singh Raipur, Rashpal Singh, Jarnail Singh met outside the courts. Chaheru was carrying a sten gun and all other militants had revolvers. When Labh Singh and Sawarnjit Singh arrived under heavy police protection, Chaheru signalled them to go to the washrooms. Once they went, Chaheru and his partners opened fire on the policemen, the attackers killed 4 police officers inside the court complex and 2 at the courtyard gate. They were able to free Sukhdev Singh Sukha, Sawarnjit Singh and Gurinder Singh Bhola.

=== Jalandhar bank robbery ===
According to Harjinder Singh Jinda after Labh Singh was free, they both met each other in Jalandhar along with Chaheru. Chaheru had told them that they were in urgent need of money. Labh Singh and Jinda told Chaheru that they would get the cash in a week. They began to scout banks in Jalandhar and selected one to rob. 3 days later at 11 in the morning Labh Singh, Jinda, and others robbed the bank of 1,250,000 rupees. (250,000 USD)

=== Other actions ===
Under Manbir Singh Tarsem Singh Kohar, the main hit man of KCF, along with Sukhdev Singh hijacked a train on 10 April which resulted in the death of 5 police officers.

On 15 July 1986, Manbir Singh organised an attack on Karpurthala Jail to rescue 2 Sikh militants. The militants were Balwinder Singh and Jagjit Singh Gill. Both of whom were “dreaded” militants. In the jailbreak 2 guards were killed and their weapons were taken.

=== Assassination of General Vaidya ===
In 1984, General Arun Vaidya had planned and supervised Operation Blue Star – a controversial military operation ordered by Indira Gandhi, then Prime Minister of India, in order to flush out a group of heavily armed Sikh militants in June 1984 at the Golden Temple, the holiest shrine of the Sikhs.

General Vaidya had moved to Pune after his retirement from the army. On 10 August 1986, General Arun Vaidya was shot and killed by Jinda and Sukha while he was driving his car home from the market. According to the police, the assailants pulled up next to his car on motor scooters and fired eight or nine shots into the car. Vaidya reportedly died instantly of head and neck wounds. His wife, who was also in the car, was wounded by four bullets in her back and thighs. According to Indian intelligence sources, Vaidya had been the number four assassination target on lists by Sikh militants and he was one of several people killed in retaliation for Operation Blue Star. Following the assassination, the Khalistan Commando Force issued a statement declaring that Vaidya had been killed in retaliation for the Operation Blue Star.

== Arrest and death ==
On 8 August 1986, Mabir Singh Chaheru was arrested along with Major Baldev Singh Ghuman, Charanjit Singh dhami and two other Sikhs when approximately 200 paramilitary troops raided Major Baldev Singh's farm House on bootan village the outskirts of city of Jalandhar, in state of Punjab. Punjab police stated that there were two dozen murder cases registered against Chaheru by that time.

It is unclear as to what led to his arrest. It is possible that government infiltrators whose aim was to plot the Gurjit Singh faction against Kahlon faction did this. Subsequently the committee members of Kahlon faction were killed by the Gurjit Singh faction.

Bhai Manvir Singh Chaheru was kept in various jails in Punjab, and later he was moved to another jail in Bihar. In December 1987, police announced that Manvir Singh had escaped from the police custody while officials were returning Chaheru from Bihar to Punjab. There were claims that police had killed him while he was in police custody and disposed his body in the Beas River. In the city of Chandigarh, the Punjab Police Chief Julio Francis Ribeiro told news reporters afterward that "...they do not need to worry as Manvir Singh will not come back."

== See also ==
- Khalistan movement
- List of actions attributed to KCF

Preceded by None	Commander-in-Chief of Khalistan Commando Force; 1984–1986	Succeeded by General Labh Singh
