= Julio Ribeiro (police officer) =

Indian police officer

Julio Francis Ribeiro
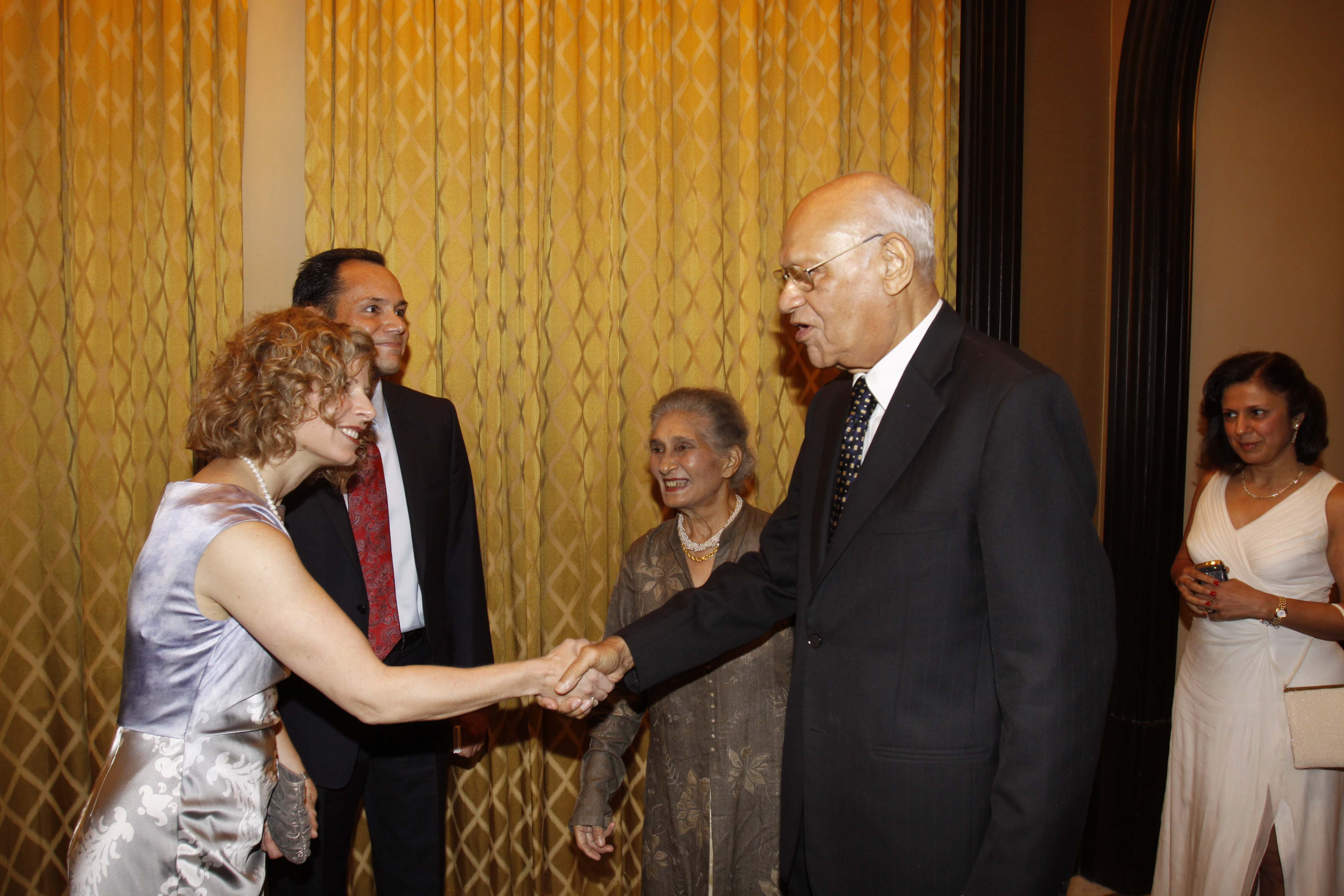
- Julio Ribeiro being welcomed by the US Consul General, Peter Haas at the 2011 US National Day Celebrations in Mumbai

Commissioner of Police, Greater Bombay
- In office 25 February 1982 – 6 June 1986

Director General,Central Reserve Police Force
- In office 4 June 1985 – 8 July 1985

Personal details
- Born: 5 May 1929 (age 97) Bombay, Bombay Presidency, British India (now Mumbai, Maharashtra, India)
- Spouse: Melba Ribeiro (m. 1959; died 2022)
- Children: 2
- Relatives: Edgar Ribeiro (brother)
- Education: Sydenham College of Commerce and Economics; Government Law College, Mumbai
- Awards: Padma Bhushan; President's Police Medal for Distinguished Service; Police Medal for Meritorious Service

Military service
- Years of service: 1953–1989

Julio Francis Ribeiro (born 5 May 1929) is a retired Indian senior police officer and civil servant, who served as Director-General of Police in Punjab between 1986 and 1989, and Commissioner of Police in Greater Bombay between 1982 and 1986.

== Early life and education ==
Julio Francis Ribeiro was born in Bombay, British India, into a family of Goan origin. He spent his childhood in Colaba, where his father worked as an Assistant Postmaster General and died when Ribeiro was eight years old.

Ribeiro did his schooling at St. Xavier's High School, Fort, Bombay, and did a B.Com. degree from Sydenham College of Commerce and Economics and later studied law at Government Law College, Mumbai.

Before joining the Indian Police Service in 1953, he worked for two years as a sub-editor at the National Standard, the predecessor of The Indian Express. He subsequently worked for approximately one year as an articled clerk at the Bombay-based law firm Crawford Bayley & Co.

== Career ==
Ribeiro joined the Indian Police Service in 1953 and rose to be the Commissioner of the Greater Bombay Police from 1982 to 1986. He was promoted to Director General of the Central Reserve Police Force (CRPF) (1985), then to Director General Police of Gujarat.

Ribeiro served as Director General of Punjab Police during its worst years of terrorism in Punjab. The New York Times reported that in the 1980s, Ribeiro led the Punjab police in a "ferocious crackdown" on Sikh militants, in a policy christened "bullet for bullet" by Arun Nehru.

He held positions such as Special Secretary to the Government of India in the Ministry of Home Affairs and Adviser to the Governor of Punjab.

Ribeiro also served as Indian Ambassador to Romania from 1989 until 1993. In August 1991, Ribeiro was attacked and wounded in a Bucharest assassination attempt by gunmen identified as Punjabi Sikhs.

In an April 2006 interview with The Tribune, Julio Ribeiro explained that "It has been a role reversal for me... from fighting militants to fighting the corrupt administration." He went on to explain that while he had been offered positions in government, "Fighting with guns was no longer my cup of tea; and I wanted to work for the people of my city, Mumbai. I wanted to be useful to lower socio-economic classes, and thus decided to work at the grassroots level."

He also serves as a non-executive Director of Glenmark Pharmaceuticals and as a Director of IIT Corporate Services Ltd. He is usually interviewed for his views on communal harmony.

== 1986 assassination attempt ==
In the early morning of 3 October 1986, 6 men in police disguise, identified in the press as Sikh militants attacked Ribeiro inside the headquarters of Punjab Police in the city of Jalandhar, Punjab, India. One guard was killed. Ribeiro, his wife, and four other police and paramilitary officers were injured. Ribeiro's wound was minor, but his wife was hospitalized. All six attackers escaped in a waiting truck. The Khalistan Commando Force (KCF) later claimed responsibility of this attack. KCF leader Labh Singh allegedly led the assassination attempt.

== 1991 assassination attempt ==
In August 1991, Ribeiro, then Indian Ambassador to Romania was attacked and wounded in a Bucharest assassination attempt by gunmen identified as Punjabi Sikhs.

== Personal life ==
Ribeiro married Melba Ribeiro (1938–2022), a schoolteacher, in 1959 in Byculla, Bombay. She died on 31 October 2022. The couple had two daughters, Ana Carl Saldanha and Nina Engineer, and had grandchildren and great-grandchildren.

Ribeiro titled his autobiography Bullet for Bullet: My Life as a Police Officer.

Julio Ribeiro's younger brother was Edgar Ribeiro (1930–2026), an architect and urban planner, who served as India's Chief Town Planner.
