= Kasso Chahal =

- Village
- Location in Punjab, India Kasso Chahal (India)
- Coordinates: 30.545651°N 76.237773°E
- Country: India
- State: Punjab
- District: Kapurthala

Government
  - Type: Panchayati raj (India)
  - Body: Gram panchayat

Population (2011)
  - Total: 305
- Sex ratio 167/138♂/♀

Languages
  - Official: Punjabi
  - Other spoken: Hindi
- Time zone: UTC+5:30 (IST)
- PIN: 144601
- Telephone code: 01822
- ISO 3166 code: IN-PB
- Vehicle registration: PB-09
- Website: kapurthala.gov.in

Kasso Chahal is a village in Kapurthala district of Punjab State, India. It is located 11 kilometres (6.8 mi) from Kapurthala, which is both district and sub-district headquarters of Kasso Chahal. The village is administrated by a Sarpanch, who is an elected representative.

== Demography ==
According to the report published by Census India in 2011, Kasso Chahal has total number of 61 houses and population of 305 of which include 167 males and 138 females. Literacy rate of Kasso Chahal is 79.79%, higher than state average of 75.84%. The population of children under the age of 6 years is 23 which is 7.54% of total population of Kasso Chahal, and child sex ratio is approximately 643, lower than state average of 846.

== Population data ==
Particulars	Total	Male	Female
Total No. of Houses	61	-	-
Population	305	167	138
Child (0-6)	23	14	9
Schedule Caste	0	0	0
Schedule Tribe	0	0	0
Literacy	79.79 %	85.62 %	72.87 %
Total Workers	84	80	4
Main Worker	83	0	0
Marginal Worker	1	1	0

== Air travel connectivity ==
The closest airport to the village is Sri Guru Ram Dass Jee International Airport.
