= List of actions attributed to KCF =

The following is a list of chronological actions attributed to Khalistan Commando Force. (KCF) Actions include killings, assassinations, bank robberies, battles, and encounters.

Khalistan Commando Force was founded by the Sarbat Khalsa and Panthic Committee. It was the "official" army of Khalistan. Manbir Singh Chaheru was made the leader in February 1986. It was most active in the Punjab Insurgency being one of the strongest and most coordinated militant groups. Later on, KCF will break into factions.

== 1980s ==
=== 1986 ===
Date	Action and details	Location	Result	Sources
March 6	KCF members led by Chaheru opened fire on the convoy of Deputy Superintendent of Police (DSP) Jarnail Singh Brar, and Kabul Singh, acting president of Shiromani Gurdwara Parbandhak Committee (SGPC). Brar was said to be the target with Kabul being in the crossfire.	Kapurthala, Punjab	7 killed and 13 wounded. Kabul Singh seriously wounded.	
March 7	KCF members led by Chaheru burned the home of police Inspector Jaskirit Singh.	Kassochal, Punjab	House burned down	
March 26	KCF members attacked and killed Arjan Singh Mastana an MLA and leader of Communist Party of India with his bodyguard. Mastana had created a militia to fight KCF.	Amritsar, Punjab	MLA killed with 1 bodyguard.	
March 29	KCF members were accused of opening fire at a barber shop. Cutting hair is forbidden in the Sikh faith.	Nakodhar, Punjab	12 killed	
April 6	Chaheru and 2 other KCF members attacked Jalandhar district court and broke free Labh Singh, Sawarnjit Singh, and Gurinder Singh Bhola who were appearing in court for murder charges. The attack was long planned by Chaheru. He would meet Labh Singh daily and had promised to break him free. Chaheru had a stengun while the other militants had revolvers. Chaheru signaled for Labh and co to go to the bathroom as they exited the court. Then the militants attacked and killed 4 officers at the steps of the court. They broke free Labh Singh and co then killed 2 officers at the gate before fleeing. This single incident became a basis of Riberio's "Bullet for bullet" policy.	Jalandhar, Punjab	3 militants broken free. 6 officers killed. 4 others wounded.	
April 10	2 KCF members hijacked a train and killed 5 police officers.	Punjab	5 officers killed.	
May	Harjind Singh Jinda, Labh Singh, and other KCF members robbed a bank in Jalandhar of 1,250,000 rupees. (US$250,000)	Jalandhar, Punjab	1,250,000 rupees. (US$250,000) robbed.	
July 15	Chaheru attacked Kapurthala Jail breaking out 2 "hardcore" militants which killed 2 prison guards. Chaheru also stole the guns of the dead officers.	Kapurthala, Punjab	2 militants broken free. 2 officers killed and their weapons stolen.	
August 10	In 1984, General Arun Vaidya had planned and supervised Operation Blue Star – a controversial military operation ordered by Indira Gandhi, then Prime Minister of India, in order to flush out a group of heavily armed Sikh militants in June 1984 at the Golden Temple, the holiest shrine of the Sikhs. General Vaidya had moved to Pune after his retirement from the army. On 10 August 1986, General Arun Vaidya was shot and killed by Jinda and Sukha while he was driving his car home from the market. According to the police, the assailants pulled up next to his car on motor scooters and fired eight or nine shots into the car. Vaidya reportedly died instantly of head and neck wounds. His wife, who was also in the car, was wounded by four bullets in her back and thighs. According to Indian intelligence sources, Vaidya had been the number four assassination target on lists by Sikh militants and he was one of several people killed in retaliation for Operation Blue Star. Following the assassination, the Khalistan Commando Force issued a statement declaring that Vaidya had been killed in retaliation for the Operation Blue Star.	Pune, Maharashtra	Former Chief of Army Staff Vaidya killed.	
August 28	Manbir Singh Chaheru was arrested on 8 August 1986. Manbir Singh would later be executed in an extrajudicial killing by police. Manbir was the first head of KCF. Replacing him was Labh Singh. Sarbjit Singh Ropar who was responsible for Manbir Singh's arrest and the acting chairperson for a faction of All India Sikh Student Federation was kidnapped by KCF on August 28. He was interrogated by Labh Singh and revealed his hand in the arrest and his fathers who was a Deputy Superintendent of Police (DSP). He also revealed his hand in the arrests of Tarsem Singh Kohar and Waryam Singh. He was soon executed by Labh Singh along with Hardeep Sahota, and Hans Raj Ghuman. Hardeep and Hans were also involved in the arrest of multiple militants and Manbir Singh.	Punjab	AISSF chairperson killed with 2 others.	
September	6 KCF members under Labh Singh robbed a bank in Talwara. The bank manager was killed and 29,000 rupees (386,000 rupees in 2023. US$4,700 in 2023) was stolen	Talwara, Punjab	Bank manager was killed and 29,000 rupees robbed.	
September 1	KCF members assassinated Additional District and Sessions Judge R.P. Gaind. He was shot 4 times dead in a store while on the phone. His wife and daughter watched the killing. He had been receiving death threats over his verdict on a case prating to Sodhal Mandir in Jalandhar. A room of it was used by Sikhs for worship. Sikhs demanded the room that was used for Sikh worship become a Gurdwara.	Jalandhar, Punjab	Judge killed	
September 25	KCF killed Darshan Singh Canadian an MLA and party leader of the Communist Party of India. Darshan Singh opposed Sikh militants and Khalistan supporting NRI Sikhs. He actively campaigned against both.	Hoshiarpur, Punjab	MLA and CPI leader killed	
September 26	KCF members killed Baldev Singh Mann. He was a left-wing activist of the Communist Party of India (Marxist–Leninist) New Democracy. He was a state level leader of Kirti Kisan Union and the editor of Hirawal Dasta. Baldev was gunned down by 4 men in his home village near Amritsar. He was walking with his brother who escaped unhurt.	Amritsar, Punjab	1 Communist leader killed.	
September 29	KCF members looted a bank and killed the bank manager.	Tarn Taran, Punjab	Bank manager killed and bank looted.	
September 30	KCF members managed to take down the Punjab Police wireless system across the entire state for half an hour.	Punjab	Police wireless system down for 30 minutes.	
October	KCF member robbed 1,023,000 rupees (US$250,000) from a bank in Ludhiana.	Ludhiana, Punjab	1,023,000 rupees (US$250,000) robbed.	
October	KCF robbed 800,000 rupees from the Millar Ganj branch of the Punjab National Bank, Ludhiana.	Ludhiana, Punjab	800,000 rupees (US$130,000) robbed.	
October 3	On 3 October 1986, 6 men identified in the press as Sikh militants in police uniforms attacked Director General of Punjab Police Julio Francis Ribeiro inside his Punjab Armed Police headquarters in the city of Jalandhar, with automatic weapons. According to Ribeiro he was strolling with his wife when Sikh militants in a jeep disguised as a police one asked to inspect a guards gun. The guards gave the gun for inspection. Soon 3 Sikh began climbing the wall and sprayed fire. After 2 minutes of fire they fled. Throughout all of this no officer returned fire or attempted to chase the Sikh. One guard was killed, and Ribeiro, his wife, and four other officers were injured. Ribeiro's wound was minor, but his wife was hospitalized. KCF leader Labh Singh led the attack.	Jalandhar, Punjab	1 police officer killed. DGP RIberio and his wife were wounded. 4 other officer wounded.	
October 30	Labh Singh personally led a bank robbery in Talwara at the State Bank of India. According to police 4 Sikhs robbed the bank and 2 people were killed and another 2 wounded. The robbery occurred in broad daylight. 2,000,000 rupees were stolen. ( About US$488,000 in 2023)	Talwara, Punjab	2 killed and 2 wounded. 2,000,000 rupees were stolen. (US$488,000)	
November	KCF members killed Congress leader Doctor Kalicharan Sharma in Ludhiana. He was a major leader of Hindus. Sharma had been a critic of the Punjabi Suba movement, and Jarnail Singh Bhindranwale.	Ludhiana, Punjab	1 political leader killed.	
November 20	KCF claimed responsibility for an attack on a Police patrol killing 4 officers,	Amritsar, Punjab	4 Punjab Police officers killed.	
December	KCF members led by Labh Singh killed DSP Rashpal Singh in his home along with his son as they both slept. After killing him they stole his stengun. The DSP had been accused of harassing Sikhs and families of militants.	Ludhiana, Punjab	1 Deputy Superintendent of Police killed with his son.	

=== 1987 ===
Date	Action and details	Location	Result	Sources
January 7	Khalistan Commando Force members assassinated Inspector General Trilok Chand Katoch. A note was left stamped by Labh Singh taking responsibility and warning other officers. Katoch was killed in 3 shoots near his home in Chandigarh. Katoch was the highest ranking police official to be killed up to that point and was the second highest-ranking officer in the state. Katoch was once in charge of Punjab Prisons until late 1986 when he was put in charge of “overseeing internal discipline and enforcing administrative rules”. KCF claimed responsibility in a phone call and threatened to strike again.	Chandigarh	Inspector General of police killed.	
January 12	KCF claimed responsibility for the killing of Mohinder Kaur, her two daughters, and a house worker for being police informants.	Tarn Taran, Punjab	4 alleged police informants killed	
February 12	In February Labh Singh, head of KCF, allegedly masterminded what was at that time the largest bank robbery in Indian history, netting almost 60 million (58 million rupees About 1.023 billion rupees in 2023. - US $4.5 million About US $12.5 million in 2023) from the Millar Ganj branch of the Punjab National Bank, Ludhiana; a part of this stolen money belonged to the Reserve Bank of India, India's central bank. It was documented as the "Biggest Bank Robbery" under "Curiosities and wonders" in the Limca Book of Records. The loot enabled the Khalistan Commando Force to buy sophisticated weapons and AK-47 rifles. The Chicago Sun-Times reported that "12 to 15 Sikhs dressed as policemen and armed with submachine guns and rifles escaped with nearly $4.5 million in the biggest bank robbery in Indian history." "No one was injured." A Police spokesman described it as "a neat and clean operation". Khalistan Commando Force members who allegedly participated in the robbery included Harjinder Singh Jinda, Mathra Singh, Paramjit Singh Panjwar, Satnam Singh Bawa, Gurnam Singh Bundala, Sukhdev Singh Sukha, Daljit Singh Bittu, Gursharan Singh Gamma and Pritpal Singh.	Ludhiana, Punjab	58 million rupees (About 1.023 billion rupees in 2023. US $12.5 million in 2023) robbed.	
February 16	KCF members killed Communist Party of India (Marxist) veteran leader and MLA Chanan Singh near Hoshiarpur. In a letter to the media KCF said that Dhoot committed blasphemy and spoke out against Sikhs.	Hoshiarpur, Punjab	CPI leader and MLA killed.	
March 30	Harjinder Singh Jinda, who had assassinated Lalit Maken, Arjun Dass, General Vaidya, and others, was being transported by police. 15 KCF members, who were armed with submachine guns and pistols, surrounded a rouge police van and blocked the front and back with two vehicles. They demanded Jinda be released or they would open fire. Jinda was released and the militants fled.	Punjab	Jinda broken free.	
March 30	In late March 1987 KCF issued a 13 policy Sikh moral code which all were to adhere to. The policies were to end dancing at weddings, end music at weddings, end to the wearing of non-traditional clothing, no tweezing of eyebrows for girls, no snipping of beards for boys, no baraats that include more than 11 people, no participation in Hindu jagratas or all-night prayers, no associating with Radhasoami Sikhs, no school uniforms that are not saffron black, and white and the end of the sale and consumption of meat, alcohol and tobacco. Those who did not respect the law were warned that they would be burnt alive. The code was largely followed. Sikh women began wearing traditional clothing and many meat, alcohol, and tobacco shops closed. Many restaurants brought in vegetarian items to the menu. Some did not follow the decree which put them in danger. Those who did not follow were forced to either pay off Sikhs or get security. Sikh leaders generally supported the decree. The enforcement of the decree in its first 2 months resulted in at least 6 killed, 60 shops burned, and complete or partial closure of 1,500 businesses. This was enforced by KCF until the end of the insurgency. One survey found that there were no meat or cigarette shops between Amritsar and Phagwara. Famous restaurants that served meat had removed it from their menu and denied ever serving it. According to Assistant Deputy Inspector General of Police in Jalandhar A.S. Siddiqui the moral code was popular among Sikhs especially those living in the rural area. He said, “Women seem to be pleased with it and there is also the fact that the AISSF has been on a massive recruitment drive through their amrit prachar (preaching of Sikh baptism) meetings. There is one meeting a day in the state, and after every meeting an estimated 200 youths pledge themselves to the service of the panth." Militants justified the moral code by saying, "No avatars, Hindu or Sikh, ever did these things. To eat meat is the job of rakshasas (demons) and we don't want people to become rakshasas."	India	Long lasting enforcement of moral code leading to 100s of deaths and the closing of 1000s of businesses.	
April 27	KCF members attacked a court in Amritsar and freed 3 KCF members, Ranjit Singh Rana, Kanwarjit Singh, and Rajbinder Singh. KCF members drove two vans into the guarded court complex and opened fire on officers transporting prisoners. The attack lasted 3 minutes with the KCF members spraying the police with bullets. No KCF members was hurt. One unidentified rickshaw puller was killed and 2 officers were seriouslly wounded.	Amritsar, Punjab	3 KCF members freed from prison. 1 killed and 2 officers seriously wounded.	
May 5	KCF members robbed 850,000 rupees from the Bank of India branch in Guru Amar Das market.	Amritsar, Punjab	850,000 rupees (10,400,000 rupees in 2023. US$126,500 in 2023) robbed.	
May 19	KCF members killed Deepak Dhawan who was the State Committee member of the Communist Party of India (Marxist). Dhawan was riding his scooter near Sanghe. KCF members approached him and told him to try and run. He tried to run, but they shot him as he tried.	Tarn Taran, Punjab	Communist leader killed.	
July 6	Labh Singh led KCF members who killed 75 Indian Army soldiers involved in Operation Blue Star and injured many more. Labh Singh and other KCF members first attack soldiers being transported by bus in Haryana killing around 40 soldiers and injuring around 30. Next they attacked and killed 35 soldiers in Fatehbad and injured others who were also being transported by bus.	Haryana and Fatehbad	75 soldiers from 9th Infantry Division killed	
July 14	KCF members killed retired Head Constable Darshan Singh wasin his field in Miarpur, Gurdaspur. Darshan, before retiring, was the bodyguard of DSP Gurbachan who had been killed by militants. Darshan had also been accused by Bhindranwale of killing innocent Sikhs.	Miarpur, Punjab	Retired Head Constable killed	
July 22	KCF members entered the farmhouse of Swaran Singh an official and vice president of the Amritsar district of the Communist Party of India. They went to where he slept with his family and opened fire. Swaran Singh, his wife. his mother, and his daughter were all killed in the fire. Swaran Singh's two other daughters were wounded, but his 5-year-old son was unhurt. They also opened fire at the porch killing a worker, and injuring two others. A note was left claiming responsibility and saying it was over Swaran Singh's protests against the Sikh militants and Khalistan.	Amritsar, Punjab	Politician and 3 family members killed. 1 house worker killed. 4 others wounded.	
August 24	Police officers surrounded KCF member Gurjant Singh Rajasthani. Gurjant fought and managed to escape. 3 officers were killed, including a sergeant, and 2 officers were wounded.	Badda Jaura, Rajasthan	3 officers killed and 2 wounded.	
October	KCF members on motorcycles shot dead Communist Party of India (Marxist) member Dr. Gurdial Singh.	Punjab	1 Politician killed	

=== 1988 ===
Date	Action and details	Location	Result	Sources
February 12	KCF Lieutenant General Sukhdev Singh Jhamke claimed responsibility for killing 3 police informants, all teacher, involved in the killing of a local Gurdwara sevadar Parminder Singh.	Rangilpur, and Chooeval, Punjab	3 police informants killed	
March 13	4 KCF members stormed the homes of Communist Party of India members. The 2 party members were taken by them and were forced to disclose the location of the village head. After reaching the home of the village leader the 2 party members were killed along with the village leader. The village leader was killed for his support of Rajiv Gandhi and participation in anti Khalistan rallies organised by Gandhi.	Kalichain, Punjab	2 Communists killed along with 1 Sarpanch	
March 17	Jaimal Singh Padha was assassinated by KCF members under Labh Singh. He was a leader of the Kirti Kisan Union, a Communist Party of India (Marxist–Leninist) Liberation front. Jaimal had written against religious communalism which angered Sikh militants. In one of his essays, he also spoke against Khalistan.	Punjab	1 Communist leader killed	
March 23	Pash, whose real name was Avtar Singh Sandhu, was killed by KCF members under Labh Singh. Paash was a supporter of the "ultra leftist Naxalite movement". He would write in support of communism and was a vocal critic of Sant Jarnail Singh Bhindranwale. Labh Singh is said to have regretted this killing in his diary.	Punjab	1 Communist writer killed.	
March 30	KCF killed one Naranjan Singh in Dilwan for being a police informant	Punjab	1 Police informant killed	
May 18	KCF member Gurjant Singh Rajasthani was accused of leading an attack on Sutlej Yamuna Link workers in Ropar. The attack left 30 workers dead and 12 injured.	Ropar, Punjab	30 SYL workers killed. 12 wounded	
July 12	KCF chief Labh Singh was killed in an encounter with police near Tanda, Hoshiarpur, Punjab, India. He had a bounty of 100,000 rupees at the time. Amritsar Police Superintendent Suresh Arora said "We have broken the back of the KCF. Sukhdev Singh was the most dreaded of the terrorists."	Tanda, Hoshiarpur	KCF chief killed	
July 16	KCF area commander Harbhajan Singh claimed responsibility for killing 3 people. In a statement he said the 3 were killed because they celebrated Labh Singh’s death with alcohol and bhangra.	Sidhva, Punjab	3 killed	
August 5	KCF area commander Surinder Singh Shinda claimed responsibility for killing an ASI. In a statement Shinda said the ASI had targeted the families of Kharkus and for that reason killed.	Faridkot, Punjab	1 Assistant Sub-Inspector killed	
October 28	Gurjant Singh Rajasthani, head of a KCF faction, claimed responsibility for an attack which blew up 2 CRPF vehicles.	Nakodhar, Punjab	2 CRPF vehicles blown up	
November 7	KCF members assassinated Major General B.N. Kumar. He was accused of initially causing floods in Punjab.	Chandigarh	1 Major General killed	

=== 1989 ===
Date	Action and details	Location	Result	Sources
January 1	KCF chief Sukhdev Singh Jhamke claimed responsibility for killing the Assistant Sub-Inspector (Thanedar) of Satta Nangal for his role in killing 4 Sikhs along with Jinda Nihang.	Satta Nangal, Punjab	1 Assistant Sub-Inspector killed	
January 1	KCF chief Sukhdev Singh Jhamke claimed responsibility for killing one Sucha Singh for his role in killing 4 Sikhs along with Jinda Nihang.	Chetanpur,Punjab	1 person killed	
January 1	KCF chief Sukhdev Singh Jhamke claimed responsibility for killing one Shinda for his role in killing 4 Sikhs along with Jinda Nihang.	Thanmeval, Punjab	1 person killed	
April 14	KCF claimed responsibility for killing a husband and wife who owned a liquor shop.	Amritsar, Punjab	2 liquor shop owners killed.	
April 19	Gurjant Singh Rajasthani and KCF members of his faction robbed a branch of the State Bank of India in Sadul. During the robbery the bank manager pressed the alarm leading to the Kharkus only getting 73,000 rupees. (7 million rupees in 2023) The bank manager was shot because of this. Afterwards the militants clashed with police killing multiple officers. 15 people were killed and over 50 injured.	Sadul, Rajasthan	73,000 rupees. (7 million rupees in 2023) looted. 15 killed and over 50 wounded.	
May	Surinder Singh Shinda, Lt. Gen. of KCF, claimed responsibility for killing 1 Assistant Sub-Inspector and injuring 3 other officers.	Punjab	1 ASI killed and 3 other officer wounded	
May	Surinder Singh Shinda, Lt. Gen. of KCF, claimed responsibility for killing 1 police informant	Punjab	1 police informant killed	
June 2	Charanjit Singh Channi Talwandi, nephew of Jagdev Singh Talwandi, was killed in an encounter with security forces. Channi was a senior member of KCF and a member of the Panthic Committee. He was dubbed as the "most wanted" militant by police. Channi was involved in the 60,000,000 rupee robbery in Ludhiana in 1987 and in the attack of Punjab Police chief JF Riberio. He was also involved in the killing of BN Kumar and an attack on Jagdev Singh Talwandi.	Ropar, Punjab	1 Sikh militant killed	
July 14	KCF claimed responsibility for an attack on an SPO (Special Police Officer) base with hand grenades that killed 6 SPOs.	Cheema Khurd, Punjab	6 Special Police Officers killed	
September 11	KCF member Gurdeep Singh Deepa and other members killed 3 “police cats”. (Police cats were militants turned police who became police insiders within the militants.) The 3 had aided in the arrest of 2 Sikh militants who would be killed in extrajudicial executions.	Punjab	3 police cats killed	
September 18	KCF members assassinated Sohan Singh Dhesi. Dhesi was the general secretary of the Shaheed Bhagat Singh Naujawan Sabha. He was also the State Secretary of the Democratic Youth Federation of India.	Punjab	1 Communist leader killed	
September 22	KCF claimed responsibility for an attack on the Superintendent of Police Operations and CRPF 48th Battalion Commander in Moharval. In the attack 20 CRPF men were killed.	Moharval, Punjab	20 CRPF officers killed	
September 22	KCF claimed responsibity for killing 5 Black Cat commandos.	Thana Ghat, Punjab	5 Black Cat commandos killed.	
October 18	KCF chief Kanwarjit Singh Sultanwind was killed in an encounter with Police. Following his death KCF broke into factions. Sultanwadi was responsible for killing 2 DSP, the son of an SP, and many politicians and journalists. His death led to a bandh.	Amritsar, Punjab	KCF chief killed	
October 27	KCF claimed responsibility for an attack, a few weeks before, on a CRPF and Police convoy which killed 18 officers including a Deputy Superintendent of Police and a Superintendent of Police.	Punjab	18 CRPF and Punjab Police officers killed. Dead included an SP and DSP.	
November 24	KCF, KLF, and BKI claimed responsibility for killing a Black Cat Commando named Avtar Singh Paroval. In a statement they stated Avtar had killed many Sikhs.	Lali Kalaa, Punjab	1 Black Cat Commando killed.	
November 24	KCF, KLF, and BKI claimed responsibility for killing a Black Cat Commando named Balwant Singh.	Baprve, Punjab	1 Black Cat Commando killed.	
November 24	KCF, KLF, and BKI claimed responsibility for killing a SPO named Harminder Singh	Noorpur, Punjab	1 Special Police Officer killed.	
December 15	KCF claimed responsibility for killing Homeguard commander Bachittar Singh. In a statement KCF advised Homeguards to leave their job unless they want to meet a similar fate.	Nikka Ghot, Punjab	1 Homeguard commander killed.	
December 15	Gurjant Singh Rajasthani claimed responsibility for killing 2 in a liquor shop.	Nawasher, Punjab	2 killed.	
December 15	Gurjant Singh Rajasthani claimed responsibility for killing 1 police informant.	Nawasher, Punjab	1 police informant killed.	
December 15	KCF claimed responsibility for killing 1 Special Police Officer and 1 Homeguard.	Tarn Taran, Punjab	1 Homeguard and 1 SPO killed	
December 22	KCF, KLF, BKI, and SSF collectively claimed responsibility for 2 bomb attacks on a Hind Samachar shop that injured 7. Amongst the injured were 2 officers, and 1 security guard.	Ludhiana, Punjab	7 injured including 2 officers.	
December 22	KCF claimed responsibility for killing 1 police informant.	Katharval, Punjab	1 police informant killed.	

== 1990s ==
=== 1990 ===
Date	Action and details	Location	Result	Sources
January 31	KCF chief, Paramjit Singh Panjwar, claimed responsibility for killing one Harbans Singh who was a police informent.	Bhalipur, Punjab	1 Police informent killed	
January 31	KLF, BKI, KCF, and SSF collectively claimed responsibility for killing Punjab BJP secretary Gurbachan Singh Patanga. In a press note they said that the BJP were greater enemies of the Sikhs than Congress and for this reason Patanga was killed.	Punjab	BJP Punajb General Secretary killed	
February 12	KCF claimed responsibility for a bomb explosion in Pathankot.	Pathankot, Punjab	Bomb explosion	
February 16	KCF, BTFK (Sangha), BKI, and SSF collectively claimed responsibility for an explosion in Phillaur that killed Inspector Harcharan Singh Soori and Assistant Sub-Inspector Ram Moorti on the 11th. The bomb also wounded 2 Sergeants. The explosion happened in an armoured and guarded police training facility. Both were put in a special armoured room for extra safety, but were killed at 9 pm from an explosion within their room. Both officers had been accused of torturing Sikhs. Inspector Soori had survived a previous assassination attempt in 1988. Soori had kill a senior KCF member, Mathrua Singh, in 1987.	Phillaur, Punjab	1 Inspector and 1 Assistant Sub-Inspector killed. 2 Sergeants wounded.	
March	Gurjant Singh Rajasthanhi claimed responsibility for killing 3 police informants.	Patiala, Punjab	3 police informants killed.	
March	Bakshish Singh Seetha, Lieutenant General of KCF, claimed responsibility for killing an Assistant Sub-Inspector.	Kalla Thanna, Punjab	1 Assistant Sub-Inspector killed.	
March	KCF area commander Gurmet Singh claimed responsibility for killing Punjab National Motor Transport Union president Nachhtar Singh for alleged blasphemy and actions against militants.	Punjab	Punjab National Motor Transport Union president killed	
March 2	KCF, KLF, BKI, and SSF collectively claimed responsibility for killing 1 Sergeant and 1 Constable of Punjab Police in Nagoke for alleged “misdeeds”.	Nagoke, Punjab	1 Sergeant and 1 Constable killed.	
March 2	KCF claimed responsibility for killing 2 people over them slaughtering cows and issued a warning to others.	Punjab	2 killed	
March 2	KCF, KLF, BKI, and SSF collectively claimed responsibility for a bomb attack in Philaur that killed 1 police constable and 2 others. They stated that they were killed because they had put fake cases on locals.	Phillaur, Punjab	1 Constable and 2 others killed.	
March 2	KCF faction chief Gurjant Singh Rajasthani and BTFK chief Gurbachan Singh Manochahal claimed responsibility for killing Amritsar Jail Superintendent Pyara Lal. They claimed he tortured Sikhs in prison.	Amritsar, Punjab	Amritsar Jail Superintendent killed.	
March 5	KCF killed 2 rapists.	Tarn Taran, Punjab	2 rapists killed	
March 15	Gurjant Singh Rajasthani claimed responsibility for an attack on the Superintendent of Police (SP) of Ludhiana. The SP managed to survive the attack, but his driver was killed.	Ludhiana, Punjab	Police driver killed.	
March 15	Gurjant Singh Rajasthani claimed responsibility for killing a head of a taxi company.	Punjab	Taxi company owner killed.	
March 16	BTFK and KCF claimed responsibility for destroying 2 police vehicles, killing 4 home guards, and inuring 2 home guards near Riaa. They also warned officers in nearby villages and cities to leave their jobs in 10 days or meet a similar fate.	Riaa, Punjab	2 home guards vehicles destroyed, 4 home guards killed, and 2 wounded	
March 16	KLF, SSF, BKI, and KCF claimed responsibility for killing a police informant named Bhagwant Singh who was involved in over 50 killings. He was also a key associate of Gobind Ram.	Punjab	1 police informant killed.	
April 6	KCF claimed responsibility for killing 2 people for allegedly sexually harassing women.	Amritsar, Punjab	2 people killed.	
April 10	KCF claimed responsibility for killing 3 rapists near Ramvala.	Ramvala,Punjab	3 rapists killed	
April 13	KCF claimed responsibility for killing 2 police black cats.	Riaa, Punjab	2 black cats killed	
April 14	KCF claimed responsibility for killing 1 police officer in Panjwar.	Panjwar, Punjab	1 officer killed	
April 14	KCF chief Paramjit Singh Panjwar claimed responsibility for killing 2 black cat commandos. Panjwar said the black cats had infiltrated KCF's ranks and killed multiple members. He added that the black cats were responsible for robberies, sexual assaults, and killings of innocents.	Baba Bakala, Punjab	2 Black Cat Commandos killed	
May 14	Gurcharan Singh Tohra, president of SGPC, was attacked in his car. A jeep with about 6 militnats drove beside Tohra's vehicle and opened fire. An escort car attempted to chase them but they escaped. Tohra managed to survive but was injured. Tohra's bodyguard was also injured. Tohra's driver was killed and so was former MLA H.S. Rajla who was accompanying Tohra. KCF, KLF, BKI, and SSF claimed responsibility saying Tohra was involved in Operation Blue Star.	Chandigarh	1 former MLA, and 1 driver killed	
July 11	KCF, KLF, BKI, and SSF claimed responsibility for killing former Punjab Finance Minister and Deputy Chief Minister Balwant Singh. Balwant was killed in a car while travelling on a busy road in Chandigarh. Balwant was a key player in the creation of the Rajiv-Longowal Accord. The accord had been opposed by many Sikh leaders and militants. Balwant had been dubbed a traitor for his involvement in the accord.	Chandigarh	Deputy Chief Minister killed	
July 23	KLF, KCF, BKI, and SSF collectively claimed responsibility for killing the Chief Engineer of the SYL, ML Sekhri, and Superintending Engineer of the SYL, Avtar Singh. They were killed while attending a meeting with fellow engineers in Chandigarh.	Chandigarh	Chief Engineer and Superintending Engineer of SYLkilled.	
September 4	KCF claimed responsibility for killing 2 police informant.	Punjab	2 police informants killed.	
September 21	KCF, KLF, BKI, and SSF claimed responsibility for an attack on a SPO base which killed 2 officers.	Punjab	2 SPO officers killed.	
September 21	KCF, KLF, BKI, and SSF claimed responsibility for killing a Nirankari in Patiala.	Patiala, Punjab	1 Nirankari killed.	
September 28	KCF, KLF, BKI, and SSF claimed responsibility for killing Inspector Rajinderpal Singh.	Punjab	1 Inspector killed.	
November 23	KCF, KLF, BKI, BTFK, and SSF claimed responsibility for killing Congress president of Jalandhar district, Gurdarshan Singh. They claimed he was a police informant involved in the killing of militants.	Punjab	1 politician killed	
November 24	At 9 am Major Singh, KCF Lt. Gen., along with other militant groups part of the Sohan Singh Committee killed Superintendent of Police (Operations) Harjit Singh in a bomb blast at Tarn Taran. Sikh militants had been studying Harjit's travel routes for some time. A remote-controlled bomb had been placed on a road Harjit usually drove by to go to the doctor. When Harjit's lead security vehicles drove by and it was just his vehicle over the bomb it was detonated. In the explosion three of his security guards were killed and his vehicle was destroyed. Harjit's limbs were found over 100 meters away from the location of the explosion. A permanent curfew was put on the town after. A saying about the incident is, “He had a security vehicle in front of him and behind him, so he would be safe from all sides. But he didn’t count on his death coming from below”. Twenty-two days prior to his death Harjit had killed the chief of BTFK (S) Sukhwinder Singh Sangha along with four other militants. KLF, KCF, Babbar Khalsa, SSF, and BTFK (S) members held a meeting afterward pledging to kill Harjit within 31 days of Sangha's death. Major Singh of KCF was given the lead role in the killing. A famous kavishri ballad about this incident says, “24th November at exactly 9, for Sangha’s revenge Major Singh and his allies have arrived. Without wasting any time Kharkus have come to kill him… The 5 jathebandis [Groups] had said we would hit him hard… To become SSP he had done many misdeeds… Watch how with a computer system [remote-controlled bomb] Kharkus blow him up. Harjit’s wife watches his limbs blow up… Operation Shera has been done on the SP of Operation.”	Tarn Taran, Punjab	SP (OPs) killed with 3 other officers.	

=== 1991 ===
Date	Action and details	Location	Result	Sources
March 1	2 KCF members attack a group of Punjab Police and CRPF officers. 1 CRPF Deputy Superintendent of Police was killed. 1 Assistant Sub-Inspector and Sergeant were also killed. Afterwards the 2 KCF members were also killed when police reinforcements arrived.	Tarn Taran, Punjab	1 CRPF DSP killed, 1 ASI killed, 1 Sergeant killed, and 2 KCF members killed.	
June 7	BTFK (Sangha), KLF, KCF (Panjwar), and SSF claimed responsibility for an assassination attempt on India's Home Minister Subodh Kant Sahay in Ludhiana. Kharkus made a bomb attack on his convoy. Sahay’s bulletproof vehicle flipped over, but he escaped with minor wounds. His driver and 1 bodyguard were seriously wounded.	Ludhiana, Punjab	Home Minister wounded, 1 driver and 1 bodyguard seriously wounded	.
June 8	KCF members killed Communist Party Marxist candidate Varinder Kumar Gagan in Nakodar. He was killed with 2 of his gunmen and 1 party worker.	Nakodhar, Punjab	2 Communists killed and 2 gunmen killed.	
August 29	Gurjant Singh Rajasthani attempt to assassinate Senior Superintendent of Police (SSP) Sumedh Saini in Chandigarh with a bomb attack. Saini “narrowly” survived the attempt. 3 of his bodyguards were killed.	Chandigarh	SSP wounded and 3 police guards kill.	
August 31	Gurjant Singh Rajasthani, head of a faction of KCF, was killed in an encounter with police. There was a 2,000,000 rupee bounty on him at the time. He was surrounded by senior police officials and their teams in a house where he was along with his wife and 3-year-old son. Rajasthani fired at police as he escaped from the back of the house. Police returned fire. Rajasthani was later found dead. Before dying he yelled, “Khalistan zindabad” (Meaning long live Khalistan) and ate a cyanide capsule.	Chandigarh	KCF faction chief killed.	
October 9	KCF along with Bhindranwale Tiger Force, Khalistan Liberation Force, and the Sikh Students Federation kidnapped Romanian charge d’affaires Lividu Radu. Radu was taken from his car at around 8 am. He was forced into the vehicle of the Kharkus by 4 Sikhs who were armed. Quickly after the kidnapping, many raids were launched by security forces. Exit routes from Delhi were blocked and authorities in Uttar Pradesh and Haryanawere warned of the situation. The kidnappers demanded the release of the killers of General Vaidya whom were Harjinder Singh Jinda, Nirmal Singh Nimma and Sukhdev Singh Sukha. The kidnappers threatened to cut Radu in pieces if their demands weren't met by October 19. The deadline passed, but Sikh militants did not harm Radu. The Indian government refused to meet any of the Sikh's demands. Radu was kept in Delhi until 27 October. He was then moved to Punjab by car. On November 25 Radu was released unharmed after 48 days.	India	Romanian charge d’affaires kidnapped and released unharmed.	
October 11	KCF (Z) claimed responsibility for killing 2 Hindu extremists near Nat village. They claimed that the Hindus had destroyed the Babri Masjid.	Nat, Punjab	2 Hindu extremists killed	
October 26	R.N. Goyal, Chief Health Officers Ludhiana, Bachitar Singh Director Health Services Punjab, and 5 others were killed by KCF, KLF, BTFK, BKI, and SSF. They claimed that the doctors had forged autopsy's, improperly treated Sikhs, and aided in police killings.	Chandigarh	CHO, DHSP, and 5 other killed.	.
November	KCF members killed Sarwan Singh Cheema who the secretary of the Communist Party of India (Marxist). He was gunned down along with security guards Santokh Singh, Ram Lubhaya, Raghubir Chand, Mohindar Singh and head constable Paramjit Singh of Punjab Police.	Punjab	1 Communist leader killed, 4 guards killed, and 1 Head Constable killed.	

=== 1992 ===
Date	Action and details	Location	Result	Sources
January 23	Gurdeep Singh Deepa, Deputy Chief of KCF, attacked BJP President Muril Manohar Joshi's caravan. The caravan was a part of the Ekta Yatra. Part of the caravan was Narendra Modi. The attack happened in Phagwara. As the caravan entered Phagwara the lead bus was attacked by Deepa and another with Ak-47's. They had disguised themselves as police officers. 3 were killed. They were the driver and 2 party workers. 40 others were injured	Phagwara, Punjab	1 driver killed, 2 party workers killed, and 40 wounded.	
January 27	KCF (Zaffarwal) Deputy Chief Sukhwinder Singh Pappu Gora killed Superintendent of Police Detectives RPS Teja, killed 7 other officers and soldiers, and wounded 5 more in an encounter near Batala. Among the dead were 2 ASI’s and 1 Inspector.The encounter began at 10 am when BSF and Punjab Police searched homes. Sukhwinder had a reward of 1,000,000 rupees on him and was wanted in 200 killings.	Batala, Punjab	1 SP (Detectives), 1 Inspector killed, 2 ASI killed, 4 officers and soldiers killed, 5 officers and soldiers wounded, and KCF Deputy Chief killed.	
March 15	Gurdeep Singh Deepa, KCF's deputy chief, killed SHO (Station House Officer) Mann Singh in Phillaur. Mann had been dubbed a butcher and had been a target of Sikh militants for much time.	Phillaur, Punjab	1 SHO killed	
April 26	KCF members killed Akali Dal MLA Balwant Singh Sarhal. Sarhal was killed along with 3 of his bodyguards.	Punjab	1 MLA and 3 bodyguards killed	
June 12	Bhai Sukhdev Singh Sukha Bhau of KCF claimed responsibility for killing Station Head Officer (SHO) Krishna Avtar. KCF members had set up a checkpoint. When the SHO arrived at the checkpoint he opened fire with another officer and attempted to escape on motorcycle. The SHO was unsuccessful and was captured. Police attempted to rescue the SHO, but he was killed and officers fell back.	Tapa Mandi, Punjab	1 SHO killed	
October 12	KCF killed Darshan Singh Kaypee and his bodyguard, a police constable, in Jalandhar. According to police 2 KCF members on an Enfield motorcycle rode up beside Kaypee's car. From there they opened fire with an assault rifle. He was a 5 time MLA for the Congress Party (I), former Punjab state minister, and was the vice-president of the Punjab Congress Party.	Jalandhar, Punjab	1 MLA and 1 Constable killed.	

=== 1993-1999 ===
Date	Action and details	Location	Result	Sources
August 31, 1995	Beant Singh was assassinated in a bomb blast at the secretariat complex in Chandigarh on 31 August 1995. The blast claimed the lives of 17 others including 3 Indian commandos. Beant Singh was accompanied by his close friend Ranjodh Singh Mann on the day of assassination. Dilawar Singh Babbar of Babbar Khalsa International acted as the suicide bomber; later, the backup bomber Balwant Singh Rajoana was also convicted of the killing. According to the Department of State the Khalistan Commando Force was also involved in the assassination.	Chandigarh	Chief Minister of Punjab killed, 3 commandos killed, and 14 others.	

== Post 2000 ==
Date	Action and details	Location	Result	Sources
February 2, 2008	In May 2007, Ram Rahim was accused of hurting the religious sentiments of the Sikhs by wearing in an advertisement attire resembling the tenth and final living Sikh Guru Gobind Singh, by using a turban with a kalgi (egret feather). Sikh militant groups began multiple attacks against Ram Rahim for this. On February 2, 2008, KCF masterminded an attack on the head of Dera Sacha Sauda Ram Rahim. Ram Rahim was attacked with an RDX laced bomb ted to a truck. Ram Rahim escaped unhurt, but 11 followers were injured with 2 seriously injured.	Punjab	11 Dera Sacha Sauda followers injured. 2 seriously.	
July 3, 2008	In a broad daylight robbery KCF members robbed 14,800,000 rupees from Oriental Bank Gurgaon.	Gurgaon, Haryana	14,800,000 rupees robbed	
July 28, 2009	KCF attacked Rashtriya Sikh Sangat (A wing of Rashtriya Swayamsevak Sangh) President Rulda Singh. He would die in August of the same year.	Punjab	RSS President killed	
