= A. S. Atwal =

Indian police officer (1943–1983)

Avtar Singh Atwal
- Born: 23 February 1943; Punjab, British India
- Died: 25 April 1983 (aged 40); Amritsar, Punjab, India
- Police career
- Country: India
- Allegiance: Indian Police Service
- Rank: Deputy Inspector General of Police
- Awards: President's Police Medal for Gallantry

Avtar Singh Atwal was an Indian police officer who served as the Deputy Inspector General of the Punjab Police. He was murdered by three unknown extremists on the steps of Golden temple while leaving after prayers on 25 April 1983 concluded by the CBI investigation that followed. His murder set in motion a chain of events that led to the commencement of Operation Blue Star. He was a posthumous recipient of the President's Police Medal for Gallantry.

Labh Singh was reported to be involved in the killing by some Indian news media but the CBI investigation contradicted the claim.

== Personal life ==
He was survived by his wife and son. His wife Amrita Atwal later joined the Punjab Civil Services and retired as an IAS officer. His son, Harbir Atwal, also joined the Punjab Police as an Inspector, currently serving as a SP.

== Death ==
On 23 April 1983, while serving as the DIG of Police Jalandhar range, Atwal visited the Golden Temple in Amritsar to pray. It was reported that Brigadier Tejinder Singh Grewal, a close relative of Atwal's, and his friend Jarnail Singh Chahal, an IPS officer of the Punjab cadre, had asked Atwal to come to Amritsar on 25 April for discussions on an important matter. Grewal was at that time posted at the army headquarters in New Delhi. Chahal was one of the individuals who had previously negotiated Bhindranwale's surrender at Chowk Mehta in 1981. According to Atwal's family, Atwal initially resisted going to Amritsar, which was way out of his jurisdiction and he felt something amiss but was persuaded by the two Indian government officials over the telephone. The three had a long discussion before Atwal went into the Golden Temple.

While leaving the Golden Temple, Atwal was shot and killed by a lone gunman. Two others were critically injured. The killing took place in broad daylight metres away from his bodyguards and official car. Immediately after the shootout, Atwal's bodyguard and car driver escaped in his car. A group of Punjab Armed Police jawans were stationed nearby but instead of nabbing the assassin, they also fled along with the crowd from the shooting spot. Some news outlets reported that militants from inside the temple came out to celebrate around Atwal's body but no such incident was reported in the CBI investigation nor reported by any eyewitness accounts in the police report.

Both Grewal and Chahal had been in conversation with Longowal and Bhindranwale at the time and at the precise moment that Atwal was gunned down, Chahal was alone with Harchand Singh Longowal and Grewal was also in the vicinity. Rather than go to the scene of crime, where Atwal's body lay unclaimed, both Grewal and Chahal left for Chandigarh in haste, where they met Governor Anant Sharma and then at night, Chief Minister Darbara Singh. The investigation of the case was handed over to the CBI, bypassing the Punjab Police who had the original jurisdiction. CBI Director J. S. Bawa was asked by Indira Gandhi to personally handle the case and report directly to her.

== Aftermath ==
The "Top Cop" Atwal's killing shocked the entire state of Punjab. It established a fear of unknown gunmen and elevated crime among the locals as the CBI investigation found no evidence of Jarnail Singh Bhindranwale's involvement in the same. The Sikhs sympathetic to the Akali movement were also appalled by the incident as they viewed it as offensive towards Golden Temple. Akali leaders had an emergency meeting to discuss the aftermath of the murder. Akali Dal such as like Harchand Singh Longowal and Gurcharan Singh Tohra immediately denounced the murder in clear terms on record. Meanwhile, Jarnail Singh Bhindranwale also condemned the killing and ascribed the killing to the Indian government.

Chief Minister of Punjab Darbara Singh advised Prime Minister of India Indira Gandhi to send the Police force inside the Golden temple. As the law and order situation in Punjab continued to deteriorate Indira Gandhi made the decision of sending in the Indian Army to flush out the militants out of the Golden Temple in Operation Bluestar.

== Published accounts ==
=== Documentary ===
"Operation Blue Star and the assassination of Indira Gandhi" (2013) is an episode of the ABP News channel TV documentary Pradhanmantri. Directed by Puneet Sharma and narrated by Shekhar Kapur, it showed the circumstances of Atwal's murder.

== See also ==
- Arjan Singh Mastana
- Baldev Singh Mann
- Darshan Singh Canadian
- Deepak Dhawan
- Gursharan Singh (theatre director)
- Jaimal Singh Padda
- Nidhan Singh Gudhan
- Pash
- Satyapal Dang
- Teja Singh Sutantar
