= List of assassinated Indian politicians =

This is an incomplete list of Indian politicians who were assassinated.

Name	Year	Place	Position	Party	Assassin(s)	Reference
Mohandas Karamchand Gandhi	1948	New Delhi	Leader of the Indian Independence movement	Indian National Congress	Main article: Assassination of Mahatma Gandhi Nathuram Godse, who blamed Gandhi for the partition of India.	
Pratap Singh Kairon	1965	Rohtak, East Punjab	Chief Minister of Punjab	Indian National Congress	Personal enmity	
Balwant Rai Mehta	1965	Kutch, Gujarat	Chief Minister of Gujarat	Indian National Congress	Main article: Gujarat Beechcraft incident A Pakistan Air Force fighter jet piloted by Qais Hussain, shot down Mehta's aircraft in Kutch during the Indo-Pakistani War of 1965.	
K. Kunhali	1969	Kerala	MLA	Communist Party of India (Marxist)	Congress affiliated trade union member	
Krishna Desai	1970	Maharashtra	MLA	Communist Party of India	Shiv Sena party members	
Azhikodan Raghavan	1972	Kerala	Convener of the Left Front	Communist Party of India (Marxist)	Unknown. Most probably K. Karunakaran group of congress(INC)	
Manzurul Hasan Khan	1972	Chitarpur, Jharkhand	MLA	Communist Party of India	Strongly raised his voice against the Mahajani Pratha across Bihar and West Bengal.	
K B Sahay	1974	Hazaribag-Patna Highway in Sindoor, Bihar	Chief Minister of Bihar	Indian National Congress	Opposite Faction of Indian National Congress.	
Lalit Narayan Mishra	1975	Samastipur, Bihar	Minister of Railways	Indian National Congress	Unknown	
Lala Jagat Narain	1981	Jalandhar, Punjab	MLA, MP, former Punjab minister	Indian National Congress	Nacchitar Singh Rode, Sawaran Singh Rode, and Dalbir Singh (Babbar Khalsa claimed)	
Mohinder Paul	1981	Kapurthala, Punjab	General Secretary of Kapurthala District	Janta Party	Sikh Militants	
Harbans Singh Machanda	1984	New Delhi	President of DSGMC	Indian National Congress	Surinder Singh Sodhi (Sikh Militants)	
Harbans Lal Khanna	1984	Punjab	MLA	Bharatiya Janata Party	Surinder Singh Sodhi (Sikh Militants)	
V.N. Tiwari	1984	Chandigarh	Member of Parliament, Rajya Sabha	Indian National Congress	Surinder Singh Sodhi (Sikh Militants)	
Omparkash Bagga	1984	Punjab	Janta Party Punjab head, ex MLA	Janta Party	Sikh Militants	
Hardyal Singh	1984	Punjab	Party President of Jalandhar	Indian National Congress	Sikh Militants	
Indira Gandhi	1984	New Delhi	Prime Minister of India	Indian National Congress	Main article: Assassination of Indira Gandhi Beant Singh and Satwant Singh (aided by Kehar Singh), Sikh bodyguards, in protest against Operation Blue Star at the Golden Temple, Amritsar. (Sikh militants)	
Balbir Singh Chaudhary	1985	Hoshiarpur, Punjab	Former MP; Party President	Punjab Lok Dal	Sikh militants	
Bhisham Parkash	1985	Punjab	Party district President	Indian National Congress	Sikh militants	
Neta Hakimuddin	1985	Meerut, Utter Pradesh	Party President of Meerut	Indian National Congress	Sikh militants	
Lalit Maken	1985	New Delhi	Member of cut,	Indian National Congress	Harjinder Singh Jinda, Sukhdev Singh Sukha and Ranjit Singh "Kuki" Gill (Sikh militants)	
Arjan Daas	1985	New Delhi	Congress (I) Leader and member of Delhi Metropolitan Council	Indian National Congress	Main article: Assassination of Arjun Dass Harjinder Singh Jinda and Sukhdev Singh Sukha over involvement in 1984 anti-Sikh riots (Sikh militants)	
Harchand Singh Longowal	1985	Sherpur, Punjab	President of the Akali Dal	Akali Dal (L)	Sikh militants	
Ram Labbaya	1985	South of Amritsar, Punjab	Leader	Indian National Congress	Sikh militants	
Raj Pal Kang	1985	Fatehgarh Chaurian, Punjab	Secretary of local branch	Indian National Congress	Sikh militants	
Kalicharan Sharma	1986	Punjab	Leader	Indian National Congress	Sikh militants	
Balbir Chand	1986	Punjab	Local party leader	Indian National Congress	Sikh militants	
Sudesh Kumar	1986	Punjab	Party activist	Indian National Congress	Babbar Khalsa (Sikh militants)	
Sant Singh	1986	Lodhar, Punjab	MLA	Indian National Congress	Harjinder Singh Jinda (Khalistan Commando Force)	
Darshan Singh	1986	Punjab	MLA; Party leader	Communist party of India	Khalistan Commando Force (Sikh militants)	
Baldev Singh Mann	1986	Amritsar, Punjab	Political Leader	Communist Party of India (Marxist–Leninist) Liberation	Khalistan Commando Force (Sikh militants)	
Harjinder Singh	1986	Amritsar, Punjab	Political Leader	All India Sikh Student Federation	Opposing party members	
Amarjit Singh	1987	Chandigarh	MLA	Akali Dal (B)	Sikh militants	
Hans Raj Sethi	1987	New Delhi	Party repersenitive on Delhi Metropolitan Council	Bharatiya Janata Party	Bhindranwale Tiger Force of Khalistan (Sikh militantns)	
Sudarshan Munjal	1987	New Delhi	Party member	Bharatiya Janata Party	Bhindranwale Tiger Force of Khalistan (Sikh militantns)	
Joginder Pal Pandey	1987	Ludhiana, Punjab	General Secretary of Punjab Congress; Former Minister; Former MLA	Indian National Congress	Sikh militants	
Satnam Singh Bajwa	1987	Punjab	Local leader	Indian National Congress	Sikh militants	
Krishnan Mahajan	1987	Amritsar, Punjab	Party official	Shiv Sena	Sikh militants	
Deepak Dhawan	1987	Punjab, Sanghe	Politician	Communist Party of India (Marxist).	Khalistan Commando Force (Sikh militants)	
Sawaran Signh	1987	Punjab	CPI Vice president of Amritsar district	Communist Party of India	Khalistan Commando Force (Sikh militants)	
Gurdial Singh	1987	Punjab	Politician	Communist Party of India (Marxist)	Khalistan Commando Force (Sikh militants)	
Vangaveeti Mohana Ranga	1988	Vijayawada, Andhra Pradesh	MLA	Indian National Congress		
Hit Abhilashi	1988	Punjab	Punjab wing president, former state minister, and former MLA	Bharatiya Janata Party	Sikh militants	
Khushi Ram Sharma	1988	Punjab	Punjab wing vice-president	Bharatiya Janata Party	Khalistan Liberation Force (Sikh militants)	
Ramkat Jalota	1988	Punjab	Punjab wing president	Shiv Sena	Khalistan Liberation Force (Sikh militants)	
Pawan Kumar Jain	1988	Punjab	Punjab wing president	Shiv Sena	Sikh militants	
Jaimal Singh Padda	1988	Punjab	Political Leader and Activist	Communist Party of India (Marxist–Leninist) Liberation	Khalistan Commando Force (Sikh militants)	
Sudhir Sharma	1988	Ropar, Punjab	Youth Wing district President	Indian National Congress	Sikh militants	
Tarlochan Singh Riyasti	1988	Ludhiana, Punjab	Former State Minister and Party leader	Indian National Congress	Sikh militants	
Jagat Ram	1988	Punjab	State Party Vice-President and State Labor Minister	Indian National Congress	Gurjant Singh Budhsinghwala (Khalistan Liberation Force) (Sikh militants)	
Vilayati Ram Kaytal	1988	Kanpur, UP	MLA	Indian National Congress	Sikh militants	
Lala Bhagwan Daas	1988	Punjab	Punjab Congress Vice-president	Indian National Congress	Gurjant Singh Budhsinghwala (Khalistan Liberation Force) (Sikh militants)	
Sohan Singh Desi	1989	Punjab	State Secretary of Punjab Democratic Youth Federation of India	Communist Party of India (Marxist)	Khalistan Commando Force (Sikh militants)	
Sat Pal Parashar	1989	Punjab	MLA	Indian National Congress	Gurjant Singh Budhsinghwala (Khalistan Liberation Force) (Sikh militants)	
Das Raj Sahota	1989	Punjab	Politician	Communist Party of India (Marxist)	Sikh militants	
Balwant Singh	1990	Punjab	Former treasurer of Punjab, former Deputy Chief Minister, former MLA	Akali Dal (L)	Gurjant Singh Budhsinghwala (Khalistan Liberation Force) (Sikh militants)	
Harminder Singh Sandhu	1990	Amritsar, Punjab	General Secretary	All India Sikh Student Federation	Khalistan Commando Force (Sikh militants)	
Malkiat Singh Sidhu	1991	Moga, Punjab	Planning Minister of Punjab	Shiromani Akali Dal	Suspected Sikh militants	
Nagina Rai	1991	Bihar	Cabinet Minister	Indian National Congress		
Rajiv Gandhi	1991	Sriperumbudur, Tamil Nadu	Prime Minister of India	Indian National Congress	Main article: Assassination of Rajiv Gandhi Thenmozhi Rajaratnam of the Liberation Tigers of Tamil Eelam in protest against Indian intervention in the Sri Lankan Civil War.	
Gagandeep	1991	Punjab	Politician	Communist Party of India	Sikh militants	
Varinder Kumar Gagan	1991	Punjab	Politician; Election Candidate	Communist Party of India (Marxist)	Gurdeep Singh Deepa (Khalistan Commandos Force) (Sikh militants)	
Sarwan Singh Cheema	1991	Punjab	MLA	Communist Party of India (Marxist)	Khalistan Commando Force (Sikh militants)	
Mohinder Kumar Ranjan	1991	Haryana	Party District President	Bharatiya Janata Party	Sikh militants	
Sher Singh	1992	Punjab	President	Shiromani Akali Dal (Youth Wing)	Khalistan Liberation Force (Sikh militants)	
Balwant Singh Sahral	1992	Punjab	MLA	Shiromani Akali Dal	Khalistan Commando Force (Sikh militants)	
Darshan Singh Kaypee	1992	Jalandhar, Punjab	MLA	Congress party	Khalistan Commando Force (Sikh militants)	
Prem Kumar Sharma	1993	Bombay		Bharatiya Janata Party	D-Company	
Ramdas Nayak	1994	Bombay		Bharatiya Janata Party	D-Company	
Thakur Ji Pathak	1994	Jharkhand, Bihar	Activist, politician	Janata Party Janata Dal	Political reasons/Mafia	
Beant Singh	1995	Chandigarh, Punjab	Chief Minister of Punjab	Indian National Congress	Dilawar Singh Babbar, Jagtar Singh Hawara, Jagtar Singh Tara, Balwant Singh Rajoana and more. (Sikh militants) (Khalistan Commando Force and Babbar Khalsa)	
Brij Behari Prasad	1998	Patna, Bihar	Politician	Rashtriya Janata Dal	Surajbhan Singh, Shri Prakash Shukla, Vijay Kumar Shukla	
Alimineti Madhava Reddy	2000	Ghatkesar, Telangana	Panchayatiraj, former Home Minister	Telugu Desam Party	Naxals	
Abdul Ghani Lone	2001	Jammu and Kashmir	Kashmiri separatist leader	Jammu and Kashmir People's Conference	Kashmiri militants	
Phoolan Devi	2001	New Delhi	Member of Parliament	Samajwadi Party	Sher Singh Rana	
Ragya Naik	2001	Maddimadugu, Amrabad, Mahbubnagar	MLA, Devarakonda constituency	Indian National Congress	Communist Party of India (Marxist–Leninist) People's War	
Haren Pandya	2003	Ahmedabad	Home Minister Gujarat	Bharatiya Janata Party		
Krishnanand Rai	2005	Baswania, Uttar Pradesh	MLA	Bharatiya Janata Party	Mukhtar Ansari and eight others (accused).	
Paritala Ravindra	2005	Ananthapur, Andhra Pradesh	MLA	Telugu Desam Party	Faction rival Maddelacheruvu Suri	
Rajo Singh	2005	Sheikhpura, Bihar	MLA	Indian National Congress	Ashok Mahto gang	
Pramod Mahajan	2006	Mumbai	Former Cabinet Minister	Bharatiya Janata Party	Pravin Mahajan (brother) for personal reasons.	
Rulda Singh	2009	Punjab	Punjab wing President	Bharatiya Janata Party	Khalistan Liberation Force (Sikh militants)	
Madan Tamang	2010	Darjeeling, West Bengal	President of the Akhil Bharatiya Gorkha League	Akhil Bharatiya Gorkha League		
T. P. Chandrasekharan	2012	Kerala	Revolutionary Marxist	Revolutionary Marxist Party	Communist Party of India (Marxist)	
Mahendra Karma	2013	Sukma, Chhattisgarh	Leader of the Opposition of the Chhattisgarh Legislative Assembly	Indian National Congress	Main article: 2013 Naxal attack in Darbha valley Communist Party of India (Maoist) insurgents	
Nand Kumar Patel	2013	Sukma, Chhattisgarh	Home Minister	Indian National Congress	Main article: 2013 Naxal attack in Darbha valley Communist Party of India (Maoist) insurgents	
Vidya Charan Shukla	2013	Sukma, Chhattisgarh	Former Minister of External Affairs	Indian National Congress	Main article: 2013 Naxal attack in Darbha valley Communist Party of India (Maoist) insurgents	
Dilip Sarkar	2013	West Bengal	Former MLA	Communist Party of India (Marxist)	Trinamool Congress members.	
Govind Pansare	2015	Maharashtra	Politician	Communist Party of India		
Durga Prasad Gupta	2016	Punjab	Head of Labour Wing	Shiv Sena (Punjab)	Khalistan Liberation Force (Sikh militants)	
Jagdish Gagneja	2016	Punjab	Political Leader and state party Vice-president	Bharatiya Janata Party	Khalistan Liberation Force (Sikh militants)	
Satpal Kumar	2017	Punjab	Political Leader and state party Vice-president	Shiv Sena	Khalistan Liberation Force (Sikh militants)	
Amit Sharma	2017	Punjab	Politician	Indian National Congress	Khalistan Liberation Force (Sikh militants)	
Ravinder Gosai	2017	Punjab	Politician	Bharatiya Janata Party	Khalistan Liberation Force (Sikh militants)	
Vipan Sharma	2017	Punjab	District Leader	Hindu Sangharsh Sena	Khalistan Liberation Force (Sikh militants)	
Kidari Sarveswara Rao	2018	Araku Valley, Andhra Pradesh	MLA	Telugu Desam Party	Naxals	
Siveri Soma	2018	Araku Valley, Andhra Pradesh	Former MLA	Telugu Desam Party	Naxals	
Kamlesh Tiwari	2019	Uttar Pradesh	Politician	Hindu Samaj Party	Islamic extremism	
Bhima Mandavi	2019	Dantewada district, Chhattisgarh	MLA, Dantewada Constituency	Bharatiya Janata Party	Maoists	
Sidhu Moose Wala	2022	Jawaharke, Punjab, India	Politician	Indian National Congress	Lawrence Bishnoi Gang	
Sudhir Suri	2022	Punjab	Leader	Shiv Sena	Sandeep Singh over hate speech	
Naba Das	2023	Odisha	State Health Minister and MLA	Biju Janata Dal	Shot by his former personal security officer	
Atiq Ahmed	2023	Uttar Pradesh	Former MP and MLA	Samajwadi Party	Reason due to murder of Dalit leader Raju Pal.	
Major Singh Dhaliwal	2023	Tarn Taran, Punjab	Congress leader	Indian National Congress	Unidentified women	
Baba Siddique	2024	Maharashtra	Former MLA & Minister	Nationalist Congress Party	Lawrence Bishnoi Gang.	

== See also ==
- List of assassinations in Asia#India
- List of assassination attempts on prime ministers of India
- List of Indian chief ministers who died in office
