= T. P. Chandrasekharan =

Indian politician

Comrade T. P. Chandrashekaran
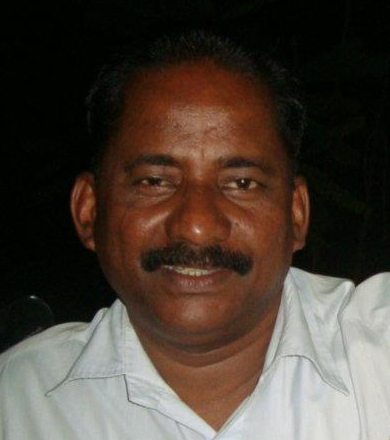

Personal details
- Born: 23 July 1960 Onchiam, Kozhikode, India
- Died: 4 May 2012 (aged 51) Onchiam, India
- Cause of death: Assassination
- Party: Revolutionary Marxist Party
- Other political affiliations: Communist Party of India (Marxist) (till 2008)
- Spouse: K. K. Rema
- Children: Abhinand R C

T. P. Chandrasekharan (23 July 1960 – 4 May 2012) was an Indian politician who was the founder of Revolutionary Marxist Party (RMP), a breakaway group of Communist Party of India (Marxist) (CPI(M)). Born in Onchiyam, a rural village in Kozhikode district in Kerala, he posthumously shot to national prominence after he was hacked to death on 4 May 2012; CPI(M)'s local organization is widely blamed as the perpetrator of the murder.

== Political life ==
Chandrasekharan at the age of 18 worked as a CPI(M) branch secretary in his local branch. During the Emergency Chandrasekharan was the Unit Secretary of SFI in Madappally High School. He also worked as the Central committee member of the Students' Federation of India (SFI). He was later appointed District Secretary of DYFI Kozhikode.

Chandrasekharan was a follower of V. S. Achuthanandan while working with the CPI(M). Chandrasekharan left the CPI(M) in 2008 and worked on forming a new political party under the name Revolutionary Marxist Party. In the 2009 local body, he led his newly formed Revolutionary Marxist Party to victory at his home panchayat in Onchiam and nearby villages.

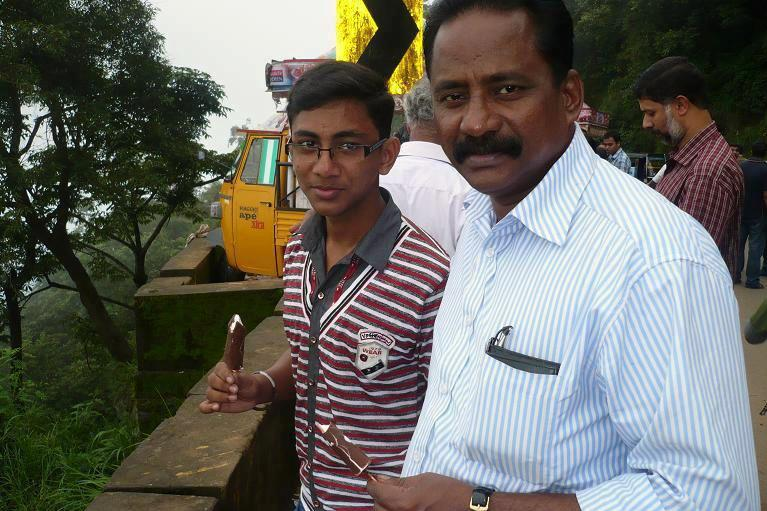
Chandrasekharan with his son Abhinand in 2011

== Assassination ==
According to police, 51-year-old Chandrasekharan was attacked by assailants on 4 May 2012, who came by a car while he was riding a motorcycle. Crude bombs were hurled at him and when he fell off the motorcycle, he was hacked to death. The body was left in a pool of blood on the road for more than half an hour after which he was taken to the hospital by the police. Chandrasekharan had 55 wounds on him, deep incisions inflicted by sharp weapons, such as swords, on the head and face. A special police team was formed to investigate the murder.

The Special investigation team probing the murder case nabbed three prime suspects accused including Kodi Suni, Muhammad Shafi and Kirmani Manoj from a hideout near Iritty in June 2012. Kodi Suni and others had been hiding at Peringanammala, a hillock surrounded by strongholds of the Communist Party of India (Marxist). Kodi Suni is a prominent criminal in Kerala who has been facing 37 cases, including two murder cases and kidnap incidents. Suni was the first accused in the murder of Popular Front of India activist Muhammed Fazal in 2006.

== Arrests ==
The prime suspect of the murder, TK Rajeesh was arrested in Mumbai by Kerala Police on 9 June 2012. More than 50, including local leaders of CPI(M) had been detained for interrogation by the investigating team.

By 10 July 2012, all of the assassination group members who had a direct involvement in the murder were arrested by Kerala Police. A Kerala court convicted 12 accused, including three leaders of CPI(M) for the murder in January 2014.

1. MC Anoop (1st accused)
2. Manoj Kumar aka Kirmani Manoj (2nd accused)
3. NK Sunil Kumar aka Kodi Suni (3rd accused)
4. TK Rajeesh (4th accused)
5. KK Mohammed Shafi (5th accused)
6. Annan Shijith (6th accused)
7. K Shinoj (7th accused)
8. KC Ramachandran (8th accused)
9. Manojan aka Trouser Manojan (11th accused)
10. PK Kunhanandan (13th accused)
11. PV Rafeeque (18th accused)
12. Pradeepan aka Lambu (31st accused) were found guilty of the crime. Court sources said the judgment, running into over 350 pages, indicated that it was a politically motivated murder.

The first seven accused, who actually took part in the killing, were found guilty under Section 302, 143, 147 and 149 of the IPC. The accused from second to seventh were found guilty under Section 148. However the second accused and third accused were also convicted under Sections of the Explosive Substances Act.

Accused Ramachandran, Manojan & Kunhanandan were found guilty under Section 120 of 302 of IPC. Rafeeque was found guilty under Section 109 while Pradeepan under Section 201 of IPC.

KK Rema, Chandrasekharan's wife said she was not fully satisfied with the verdict, yet it had exposed the role of the CPI(M) in Kozhikode and Kannur districts hatching a plot to kill her husband. She also demanded a probe by the CBI into the case.

== Aftermath ==
The murder was widely covered for at least a month on the Kerala media and brought out significant tremors in the CPI(M). V. S. Achuthanandan demanded immediate changes in the state leadership and to constitute an ad hoc committee, failing which would result in him relinquishing his position as leader of the opposition in the state assembly.

Pinarayi Vijayan, a leader of CPI(M), remarked that traitors are always traitors, an indirect reference to Chandrasekharan's exit from the party back in 2008. The comment came a few days after Chandrasekharan's murder.

A memorial erected by RMP members in remembrance of Chandrasekharan's murder have reportedly been attacked constantly by CPI(M) members and consequently had to be rebuilt five times.

His widow K. K. Rema won the 2021 Kerala Legislative Assembly election for becoming MLA of Vatakara Constituency by the support of the main opposition coalition - United Democratic Front (U.D.F.), including Indian Union Muslim League (IUML). Her connections with IUML and UDF raised eyebrows of her husband's ideological followers. She wore a badge with the picture of T. P. Chandrasekharan for her swearing in as MLA.

== See also ==
- List of assassinated Indian politicians
