= Revolutionary Marxist Party =

- Abbreviation: RMP
- Founder: T. P. Chandrasekharan
- Founded: 2008; 18 years ago
- Dissolved: 2016; 10 years ago
- Split from: Communist Party of India (Marxist)
- Succeeded by: Revolutionary Marxist Party of India
- Headquarters: Onchiyam, Vatakara (India)
- Ideology: Communism; Marxism-Leninism; Socialism
- Political position: Left-wing

The Revolutionary Marxist Party (RMP) was a political party in Kerala, India. It was founded by T. P. Chandrasekharan. It claims to uphold real communist ideologies and maintain internal democracy. It was found after T.P. Chandrasekharan, an ex-CPI (M) leader, was expelled from his party in 2008.

== History ==
The genesis of RMP, was following years of difference of opinion that CPI(M) members of Onchiyam region had with state leadership over dilution of party ideology. The differences accentuated following official group of CPI(M) favouring Janata Dal (Secular) rule in Eramala Panchayat.

In 2008, the official group expelled members including T. P. Chandrasekharan from the party and it resulted in the formation of RMP. He was hacked to death by some assailants, believed to be CPI (M) supporters on 4 May 2012. Thereafter N.Venu assumed leadership of the party; TP's widow K.K. Rema is also a main face of the party.

=== Electoral foray ===
Chandrasekharan contested in the Lok Sabha elections of 2009 as its candidate and his candidature and activism resulted in CPI(M) losing Vatakara Lok Sabha constituency in 2009. K. K. Rema contested from Vadakara Assembly constituency in 2016 Kerala Legislative Assembly election, but she was defeated. In 2019 Indian general election they stood against LDF candidate P. Jayarajan by offering support to UDF candidate K. Muraleedharan. In 2021 Kerala Legislative Assembly election, K. K. Rema won the elections from Vadakara as a United Democratic Front candidate.

=== Reformative Coalitions ===
Since initial days, RMP was part of various reformative coalitions formed to undertake course correction for mainstream Left parties. They were integral part of Idathupaksha Ekopana Samithi (Left Coordination Committee, a group of reformist who opposed policies of CPI(M) led by Pinarayi Vijayan that was formed after 2008. In 2011, RMP spearheaded formation of Elamkulam Communist Group. In 2014, Revolutionary Marxist Party has formed a Left United Front with Socialist Unity Centre of India (Communist) and Marxist Communist Party of India (United) as its allies. In 2014, they have also associated with Aam Aadmi Party to fight against corruption. In 2016, around ten minor leftist parties scattered in various parts of India merged with RMP to form Revolutionary Marxist Party of India (RMPI), thus making it a party working in national level.

== See also ==
- T. P. Chandrasekharan
