= Arjan Singh Mastana =

Indian politician

Member of the Punjab Legislative Assembly
- Constituency: Valtoha

Personal details
- Died: 27 March 1986
- Party: Communist Party of India
- Occupation: Communist leader

Arjan Singh Mastana was the well-known communist leader of Punjab. He was elected to the Punjab legislative assembly from Valtoha constituency on the Communist Party of India's election symbol. On the 27 of March 1986, during the insurgency in Punjab, India, Sikh militants killed Arjan Singh Mastana a Punjab MLA for the Communist Party of India. Mastana had raised armed squads to oppose Sikh militants. Sikh militants pretending to be cops that were beating fake peasants. This lured Mastana out. He was then killed by the Sikh militants.

== See also ==
- Baldev Singh Mann
- Darshan Singh Canadian
- Deepak Dhawan
- Gursharan Singh (theatre director)
- Jaimal Singh Padda
- Nidhan Singh Gudhan
- Pash
- Satyapal Dang
- Teja Singh Swatantar
- Punjab insurgency
