= Jagmohan Singh =

Jagmohan Singh is an Indian name and may refer to

- Jagmohan Singh (activist) one of the leaders of the 2020–2021 Indian farmers' protest
- Jagmohan Singh (athlete) (1932–2020), Indian hurdler
- Jagmohan Singh Kang a minister and politician from Punjab India
- Jagjit Singh an Indian Ghazal singer's birth name
