= Pash =

Punjabi poet

Avtar Singh Sandhu
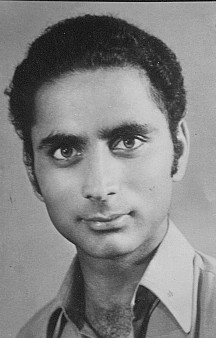

Personal details
- Born: 9 September 1950 Talwandi Salem, Punjab, India
- Died: 23 March 1988 (aged 37) Talwandi Salem, Punjab, India
- Cause of death: Assassination
- Citizenship: India
- Party: Communist Party of India (Marxist–Leninist)
- Occupation: Poet
- Nickname: Pash

Avtar Singh Sandhu (9 September 1950 – 23 March 1988), who wrote under the pen name Pash, was an Indian poet, one of the major poets in Punjabi of the 1970s. He was killed by Sikh extremists on 23 March 1988. His strongly left-wing views were reflected in his poetry.

== Early life and activism ==
Pash was born as Avtar Singh Sandhu in 1950 in a small village called Talwandi Salem in Jalandhar district of Punjab, India, in a middle-class farmers family. His father Sohan Singh Sandhu was a soldier in the Indian Army who also composed poetry as a hobby. Pash grew up in the midst of the Naxalite movement, a revolutionary movement in India against the landlords, industrialists, traders, etc. who control the means of production. This was in the midst of the Green revolution which had addressed India's problem of famine using high yield crops, but had also unconsciously led to other forms of inequities in Punjab.

In 1970, he published his first book of revolutionary poems, Loh-Katha (Iron Tale), at the age of 18. His militant and provocative tone raised the ire of the establishment and a murder charge was soon brought against him. He spent nearly two years in jail, before being finally acquitted.

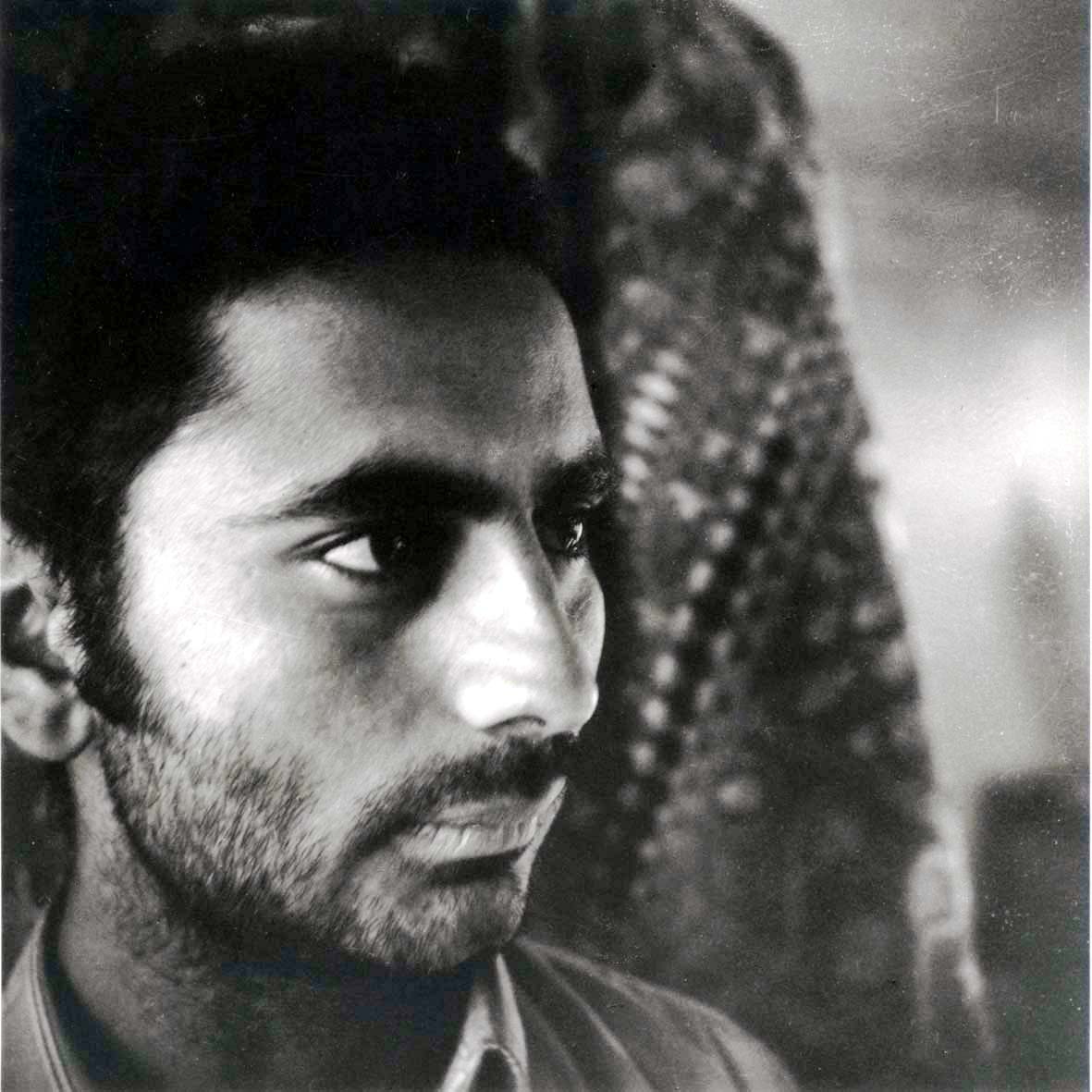
Pash in 1973 in Nakodar

On acquittal, the 22-year-old became involved in Punjab's Maoist front, editing a literary magazine, Siarh (The Plow Line) and in 1973 Pash founded 'Punjabi Sahit Te Sabhiachar Manch' (Punjabi Literature and Culture Forum). He became a popular political figure on the Left during this period and was awarded a fellowship at the Punjabi Academy of Letters in 1985. He ran to the United Kingdom and the United States the following year; while in the US, he became involved with the Anti-47 Front, opposing Khalistani violence. His words had a great influence on the minds of the people.

== Assassination ==
At the beginning of 1988 Pash was in Punjab for the renewal of his visa from the US. A day before leaving for Delhi, however, he was gunned down by three men along with his friend Hans Raj at the well in his village Talwandi Salem on 23 March 1988. Pash was assassinated for being a vocal critic of Sikh leader Jarnail Singh Bhindranwale.

== Literary works ==
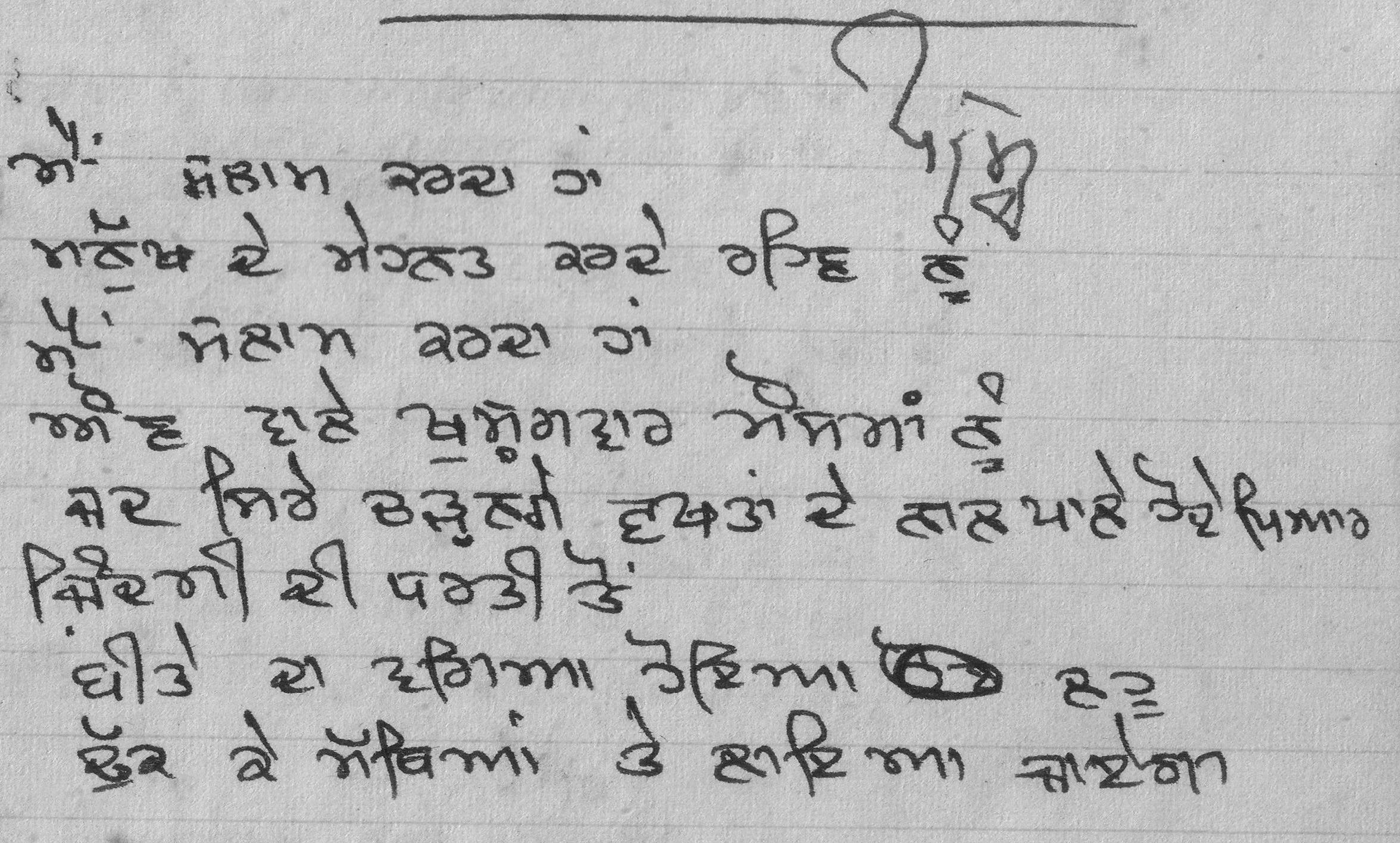
Original Transcript of a poem by Pash (Avatar Singh) - a revolutionary poet of Punjab, India. Reproduced here under creative commons - original copyright remains with the author and his family.

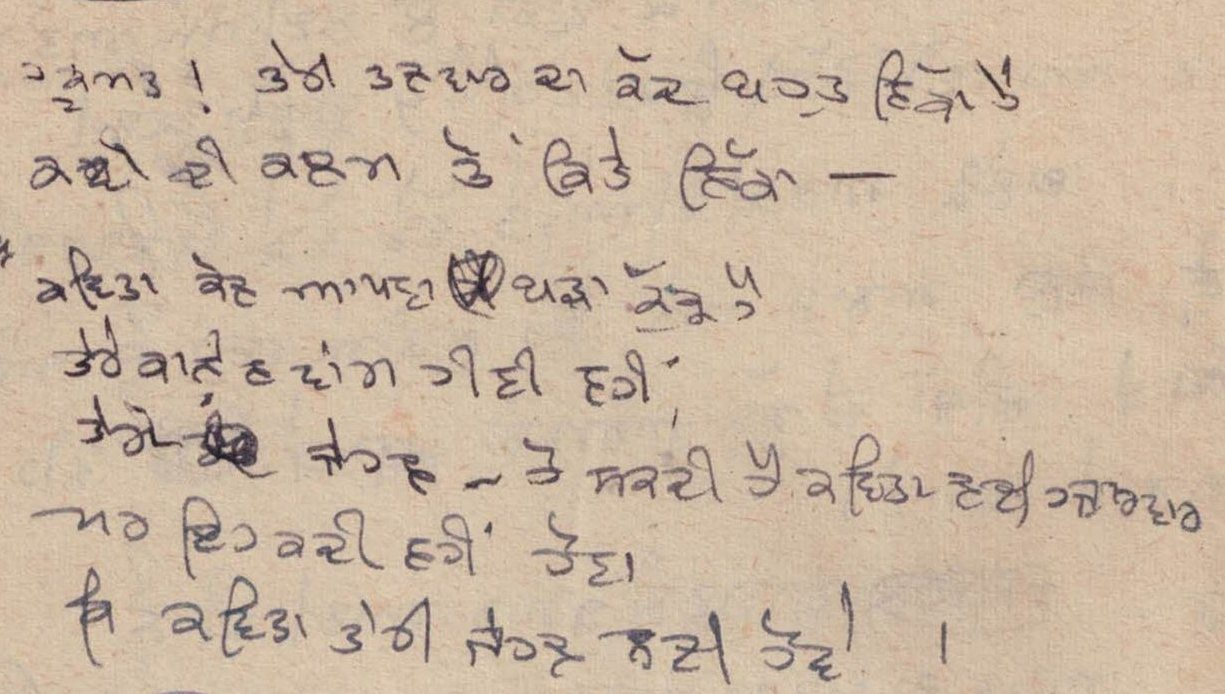
Original transcript of Hakumat (By Pash)

- Loh-katha (Iron-Tale) (1970),
- Uddade Bazan Magar (Following The Flying Hawks) (1973),
- Saadey Samiyaan Vich (In Our Times) (1978), and
- Khilre Hoye Varkey (Scattered pages) (1989)

Khilre Hoey Varkey was posthumously published in 1989 after his death, followed by his journals and letters. A selection of his poems in Punjabi, Inkar, was published in Lahore in 1997. His poems have been translated in many languages including other Indian languages, Nepali and English. One of Pash's most popular and often cited poems is titled in Hindi Sabse Khatarnak hota hai hamare sapnon ka mar jaana - meaning: The most dangerous thing is the demise of our dreams. In 2005, this poem was included in NCERT's Hindi book for 11th standard.

Poems written by Pash are popular in India, especially in Punjab and North India. Recitations of his poems are often carried out, especially on the weekends close to his death anniversary.

== In the media ==
In 2015, Punjabi singer and songwriter Gurvinder Brar released a song entitled "Shiv Di Kitaab" which was about poetry comparison in Shiv Kumar Batalvi's and Pash's styles. Couplets from Pash's famous writings were used as references in the song's music video. This song also happened to be the debut music video appearance for Indian actress Shehnaaz Gill.

In 2017, Punjabi rapper Kay Kap created a song entitled "My Land Is Dyin'" featuring a narrative upon visualizing what must have happened moments before Pash was gunned down. The song lyrics featured a verse in storytelling format about a poet and a farmer discussing the future of Punjab. The single was released on Pash's 29th death anniversary. In 2020, Kay Kap's album Rough Rhymes for Tough Times featured a song entitled "Ijaad" which had couplets from Pash's poem "Ghaah" in the outro vocals.

In 2021, Punjabi singer and songwriter Sidhu Moose Wala's album Moosetape featured two songs entitled "G-Shit" and "Power". Lyrics of both songs mentioned Pash in a similar manner. Sidhu self-proclaimed himself to be modern-day Pash in terms of vision.

== See also ==
- ਡਾ. ਸੁਖਪਾਲ ਸੰਘੇੜਾ
- Arjan Singh Mastana
- Baldev Singh Mann
- Darshan Singh Canadian
- Deepak Dhawan
- Gursharan Singh (theatre director)
- Jaimal Singh Padda
- Nidhan Singh Gudhan
- Punjab insurgency
