= Dilip Sarkar =

Indian politician

Dilip Sarkar (1948 or 1949 – 9 June 2013) was an Indian politician, who was a West Bengal MLA for Barabani.

== Death ==
On 9 June 2013 Sarkar was shot and killed, at the age of 64.

== See also ==
- List of assassinated Indian politicians
