= K. Kunhali =

Indian politician

Karikadan Kunhali

MLA
- Constituency: Nilambur

Personal details
- Born: 8 July 1924 Kondotty, Madras Presidency, British India
- Died: 28 July 1969 (aged 45)
- Party: CPI(M)
- As of 26 January, 2009 Source: Legislators of Kerala

Karikadan Kunhali (8 July 1924 – 28 July 1969), also known as Sakhavu Kunhali (Comrade Kunhali), was a malayali communist leader and a two time MLA of Kerala Legislative Assembly from Nilambur. He was assassinated by a gunman hired by the rival political party member of Congress.

== Early life ==
Born in the village of Kondotty, in Malappuram district of Kerala, Kunhali had his primary education at Kondotty UP School and secondary education at Malappuram Govt. High School. In 1942 he joined Indian Army. Life in the army helped mold him into a good soldier who fought injustice in society till his last breath. Soon after the world war ended he quit the army and returned to his home state Kerala. Kunjali actively involved in various social activities in the Eranad region (present-day Malappuram district) of Kerala.

== See also ==
- List of assassinated Indian politicians
