= Jagmohan Singh (athlete) =

Indian hurdler (1932–2020)

Personal information
- Nationality: Indian
- Born: Jagmohan Nat Singh; 1 April 1932 Rajoana, Ludhiana district, Punjab
- Died: 17 November 2020 (aged 88) Patiala, Punjab

Sport
- Sport: Track and field
- Event: 110 metres hurdles

Jagmohan Singh (1 April 1932 – 17 November 2020) was an Indian hurdler. He competed in the men's 110 metres hurdles at the 1960 Summer Olympics.

Singh died on 17 November 2020 at the age of 88.
