= Vadakara Assembly constituency =

Constituency of the Kerala legislative assembly in India

Vadakara
- Constituency No. 20 for the Kerala Legislative Assembly
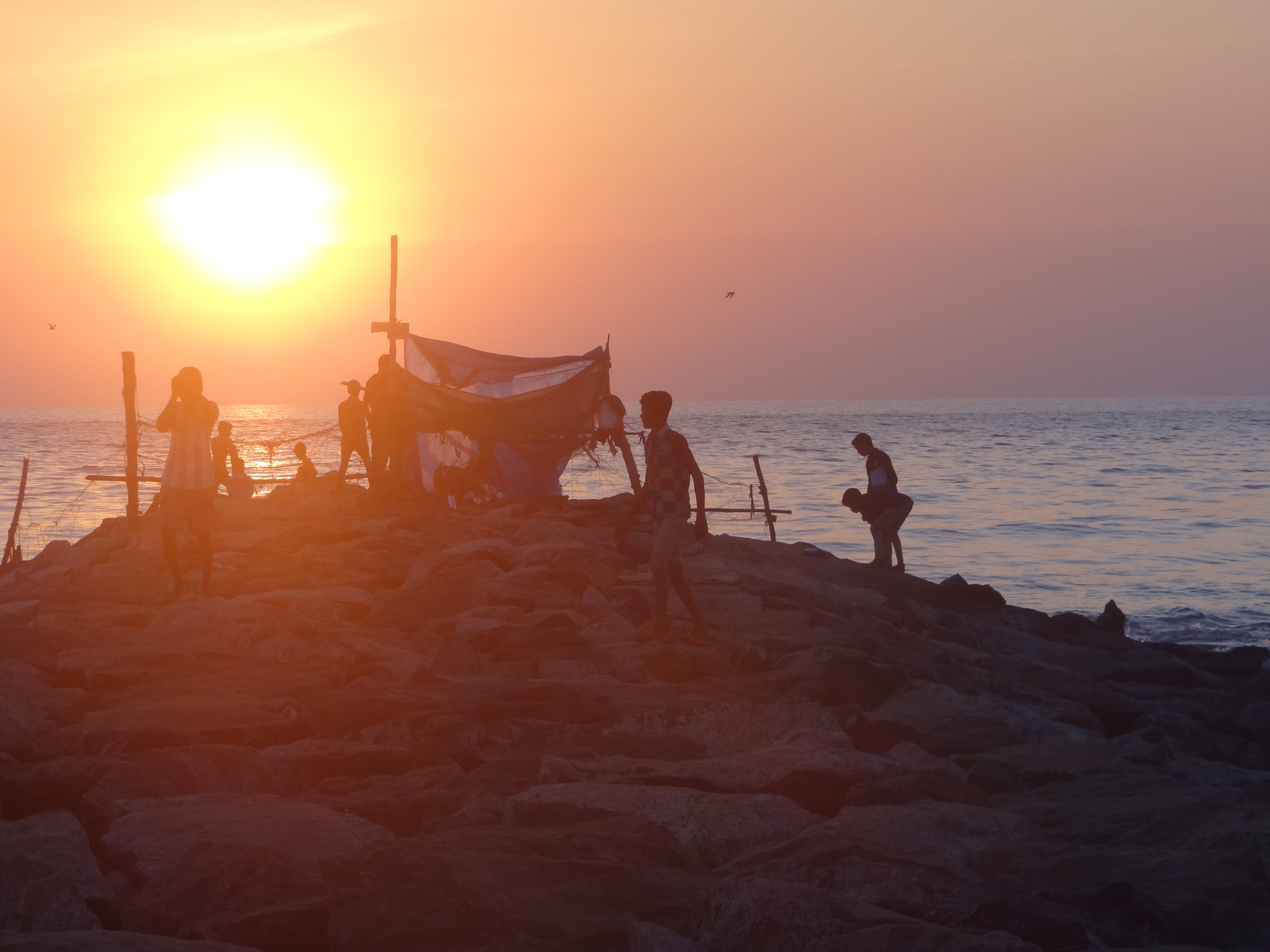
- Vadakara Sandbank

Constituency details
- Country: India
- Region: South India
- State: Kerala
- District: Kozhikode
- Established: 1951
- Total electors: 167,406 (2021)
- Reservation: None

Member of Legislative Assembly
- 16th Kerala Legislative Assembly
- Incumbent K. K. Rema
- Party: RMPI
- Alliance: UDF
- Elected year: 2026

Vadakara State assembly constituency is one of the 140 state legislative assembly constituencies in Kerala in southern India. It is also one of the seven state legislative assembly constituencies included in Vatakara Lok Sabha constituency. As of the 2026 Assembly election, the current MLA is K. K. Rema of Revolutionary Marxist Party of India.

== Local self-governed segments ==
Vadakara Assembly constituency is composed of the following local self-governed segments:

Sl no.	Name	Status (Grama panchayat/Municipality)	Taluk
1	Vatakara	Municipality	Vatakara
2	Azhiyur	Grama panchayat	Vatakara
3	Chorode	Grama panchayat	Vatakara
4	Eramala	Grama Panchayat	Vatakara
5	Onchiam	Grama panchayat	Vatakara

== Members of Legislative Assembly ==
The following list contains all members of Kerala Legislative Assembly who have represented the constituency:

Year	Member	Political party
1957	M. Krishnan	Communist Party of India
1960	M. Krishnan	Samyukta Socialist Party
1967	M. Krishnan	Praja Socialist Party
1970	M. Krishnan	Socialist Party
1977	K. Chandrasekharan	Bharatiya Lok Dal
1980	K. Chandrasekharan	Janata Party
1982	K. Chandrasekharan	Janata Party
1987	K. Chandrasekharan	Janata Party
1991	K. Chandrasekharan	Janata Dal
1996	C. K. Nanu	Janata Dal
2001	C. K. Nanu	Janata Dal (Secular)
2006	M. K. Premnath	Janata Dal (Secular)
2011	C. K. Nanu	Janata Dal (Secular)
2016	C. K. Nanu	Janata Dal (Secular)
2021	K. K. Rema	Revolutionary Marxist Party of India
2026	K. K. Rema	Revolutionary Marxist Party of India

== Election results ==
=== 2026 ===
2026 Kerala Legislative Assembly election: Vadakara
Party	Candidate	Votes	%	±%
RMPI	K. K. Rema	70,117	48.97	▲1.34
RJD	M. K. Bhaskaran	55,255	38.59	▼3.56
BJP	K. Dileep	14,295	9.98	▲2.50
SDPI	Shamseer Chombala	2,477	1.73	▼0.35
NOTA	None of the above	394	0.28	▲0.02
Independent	Rama T. P.	200	0.14	
Independent	Bhaskaran K. K.	185	0.13	
Independent	Rama	162	0.11	
Independent	Ramakrishnan Vattakandi	94	0.07	
Margin of victory		14,862	10.38	▲4.90
Turnout		1,43,179		
RMPI hold		Swing	▲1.34	

=== 2021 ===
2021 Kerala Legislative Assembly election: Vadakara
Party	Candidate	Votes	%	±%
RMPI	K. K. Rema	65,093	47.63	▲16.99
LJD	Manayath Chandran	57,602	42.15	▲4.17
BJP	M. Rajesh Kumar	10,225	7.48	▼3.28
SDPI	Musthafa Paleri	2,836	2.08	▲0.02
NOTA	None of the above	353	0.26	▼0.13
Independent	Gangadharan Madappally	186	0.14	
Independent	K. T. K. Rama Padannayil	137	0.10	
Independent	Rama Kuniyil	126	0.09	
Independent	Velluparambath Chandran	63	0.05	
Independent	Rama Cheriyakaiyil	52	0.04	
Margin of victory		7,491	5.48	
Turnout		1,36,673	81.64	▲0.10
RMPI gain from JD(S)		Swing	▲16.99	

=== 2016 ===
There were 1,58,907 registered voters in the constituency for the 2016 election.

2016 Kerala Legislative Assembly election: Vadakara
Party	Candidate	Votes	%	±%
JD(S)	C. K. Nanu	49,211	37.98	▼3.07
JD(U)	Manayath Chandran	39,700	30.64	−
RMPI	K. K. Rema	20,504	15.82	New
BJP	M. Rajeshkumar	13,937	10.76	▲4.71
SDPI	P. Abdul Hameed	2,673	2.06	▼0.99
Independent	Madaparambath Chandran	1,648	1.27	−
NOTA	None of the above	506	0.39	−
Independent	K. K. Rema Kuniyil	352	0.27	−
CPI(ML)L	Stalin P. P.	284	0.22	−
Independent	T. K. Nanu	279	0.22	−
Independent	Mathath Chandran	240	0.19	−
Independent	T. P. Rama Vadakke Eroth	238	0.18	−
Margin of victory		9,511	7.34	▲6.60
Turnout		1,29,572	81.54	▲0.82
JD(S) hold		Swing	▲3.07	

=== 2011 ===
There were 1,41,564 registered voters in the constituency for the 2011 election.

2011 Kerala Legislative Assembly election: Vadakara
Party	Candidate	Votes	%	±%
JD(S)	C. K. Nanu	46,912	41.05	
SJ(D)	M. K. Premnath	46,065	40.31	
Independent	N. Venu	10,098	8.84	
BJP	M. P. Rajan	6,909	6.05	
SDPI	Saalim Azhiyur	3,488	3.05	
Independent	V. K. Premnathan	795	0.70	
Margin of victory		847	0.74	
Turnout		1,14,267	80.72	
JD(S) hold		Swing		

=== 1952 ===
1952 Madras Legislative Assembly election: Vadakara
Party	Candidate	Votes	%	±%
Socialist Party (India)	Moidu Keloth	29,356	68.98%	
INC	Chattu, Ayatathil	13,204	31.02%	31.02%
Margin of victory		16,152	37.95%	
Turnout		42,560	66.88%	
Registered electors		63,638		
Socialist Party (India) win (new seat)				

== See also ==
- Vatakara
- Kozhikode district
- List of constituencies of the Kerala Legislative Assembly
- 2016 Kerala Legislative Assembly election
