= Nidhan Singh Gudhan =

Indian communist activist

Former President : Punjab Kisan Union

President : Punjab Sangharsh Committee, Ropar

Founding Editor of Surkh Rekha

Personal details
- Born: Ghudani Kalan, Punjab, India
- Died: Ghudani Kalan, Punjab, India
- Cause of death: Killed by Khalistan movement extremists
- Party: Communist Party of India (Marxist–Leninist)
- Occupation: Communist leader

Nidhan Singh Gudhan was an Indian communist activist, a central team member of Communist Party of India (Marxist-Leninist). He was tortured and then hanged by Khalistan movement extremists. At the time of his death, he was leading Kisan Sangharsh Samiti of Ropar district. He was the founding editor of the journal Surkh Rekha. He also held the president-ship of Punjab Kisan Union.

During Punjab insurgency, Khalistan movement extremists kidnapped Nidhan Singh Gudhan. He was tortured as the extremists were trying to investigate the secrets of Communist Party of India (Marxist–Leninist) and about their revolutionary paper Surkh Rekha. On refusing their demands, he was hanged to death.

== See also ==
- Arjan Singh Mastana
- Baldev Singh Mann
- Darshan Singh Canadian
- Deepak Dhawan
- Jaimal Singh Padda
- Pash
- Punjab insurgency
- Communist Party of India (Marxist-Leninist)
