= Khetwadi Assembly constituency =

Former constituency of the Maharashtra legislative assembly in India

Coordinates: 18.96°N 72.82°E

Khetwadi
- Former constituency for the Maharashtra Legislative Assembly

Constituency details
- Country: India
- Region: Western India
- State: Maharashtra
- Established: 1967
- Abolished: 2008

Khetwadi Vidhan Sabha seat was one of the seats in Maharashtra Legislative Assembly in India. It was made defunct after the constituency map of India was redrawn in 2008.

== Members of Legislative Assembly ==
Year	Member	Party
1967	M. N. Gogate	Indian National Congress
1972	Anant Namjoshi	Indian National Congress
1978	Khaleeq Ahmed Khan	Janata Party
1980	Prem Kumar Sharma	Bharatiya Janata Party
1985	Prem Kumar Sharma	Bharatiya Janata Party
1990	Prem Kumar Sharma	Bharatiya Janata Party
1995	Mohan Raichura	Bharatiya Janata Party
1999	Atul Shah	Bharatiya Janata Party
2004	Bhai Jagtap	Indian National Congress
2008 onwards: Constituency does not exist

== Election results ==
=== Assembly Election 2004 ===
2004 Maharashtra Legislative Assembly election : Khetwadi
Party	Candidate	Votes	%	±%
INC	Ashok Arjunrao Alias Bhai Jagtap	23,650	52.09%	▲18.06
BJP	Atul Shah	19,876	43.78%	▲1.05
Independent	Mohammed Hanif Abbas Mansuri	735	1.62%	New
SP	Rakesh Mahadeo Gadekar	305	0.67%	▼19.94
Independent	Taiyeb Ali Ebrahim Dhorajiwala	289	0.64%	New
Margin of victory		3,774	8.31%	▼0.38
Turnout		45,488	44.12%	▲0.67
Total valid votes		45,401		
Registered electors		1,03,099		▼6.20
INC gain from BJP		Swing	▲9.37	

=== Assembly Election 1999 ===
1999 Maharashtra Legislative Assembly election : Khetwadi
Party	Candidate	Votes	%	±%
BJP	Atul Shah	20,404	42.72%	▼3.89
INC	Deshmukh Sahebrao Ramchandra	16,252	34.03%	▲10.62
SP	Yaqoob Memon	9,845	20.61%	▼6.18
Independent	Suresh Harishchandra Mayekar	377	0.79%	New
The Humanist Party of India	Mahesh Vasant Kadam	322	0.67%	New
National Minorities Party	Hakiqallah Khan	289	0.61%	New
Margin of victory		4,152	8.69%	▼11.13
Turnout		47,763	43.45%	▼17.36
Total valid votes		47,757		
Registered electors		1,09,917		▲2.81
BJP hold		Swing	▼3.89	

=== Assembly Election 1995 ===
1995 Maharashtra Legislative Assembly election : Khetwadi
Party	Candidate	Votes	%	±%
BJP	Raichura Mohan D.	30,305	46.61%	▼1.36
SP	Memon Yaqoob Jan Mohamed	17,419	26.79%	New
INC	Kisan Jadhav	15,219	23.41%	▼12.36
JD	Khalid Kureshi	686	1.06%	▼13.80
Margin of victory		12,886	19.82%	▲7.61
Turnout		66,000	61.73%	▲14.55
Total valid votes		65,013		
Registered electors		1,06,913		▼12.14
BJP hold		Swing	▼1.36	

=== Assembly Election 1990 ===
1990 Maharashtra Legislative Assembly election : Khetwadi
Party	Candidate	Votes	%	±%
BJP	Premkumar Shankardatt Sharma	27,006	47.98%	▲5.99
INC	Prakash Binsale	20,135	35.77%	▼6.03
JD	Sayyed Mohammed Bakar	8,360	14.85%	New
Independent	M. H. Quraishi	565	1.00%	New
Margin of victory		6,871	12.21%	▲12.02
Turnout		56,817	46.69%	▲3.25
Total valid votes		56,289		
Registered electors		1,21,687		▲13.55
BJP hold		Swing	▲5.99	

=== Assembly Election 1985 ===
1985 Maharashtra Legislative Assembly election : Khetwadi
Party	Candidate	Votes	%	±%
BJP	Premkumar Shankardatt Sharma	19,354	41.99%	▼5.01
INC	Qureshi M. Ismail Abdul Karim	19,267	41.80%	New
Independent	Asad Khan Abdul Ghaffar	6,962	15.10%	New
Margin of victory		87	0.19%	▼0.17
Turnout		46,612	43.50%	▲10.28
Total valid votes		46,093		
Registered electors		1,07,166		▼10.77
BJP hold		Swing	▼5.01	

=== Assembly Election 1980 ===
1980 Maharashtra Legislative Assembly election : Khetwadi
Party	Candidate	Votes	%	±%
BJP	Premkumar Shankardatt Sharma	18,475	47.00%	New
INC(I)	Qureshi M. Ismail Abdul Karim	18,335	46.65%	▲30.55
JP	Shah Ambrish Bhanukant	1,665	4.24%	▼50.82
Independent	Samdani Hassam Kasam	684	1.74%	New
Margin of victory		140	0.36%	▼38.61
Turnout		39,718	33.07%	▼19.93
Total valid votes		39,306		
Registered electors		1,20,099		▼3.94
BJP gain from JP		Swing	▼8.05	

=== Assembly Election 1978 ===
1978 Maharashtra Legislative Assembly election : Khetwadi
Party	Candidate	Votes	%	±%
JP	Khan Khaleeq Ahmed	36,246	55.06%	New
INC(I)	Deshmukh Sahebrao Ramchandra	10,594	16.09%	New
SS	Padwal Chandrakant Shankar	9,820	14.92%	New
INC	Gandhi Ibrahim Peer Mohammad	8,940	13.58%	▼46.12
Margin of victory		25,652	38.97%	▼1.90
Turnout		66,891	53.50%	▼7.50
Total valid votes		65,833		
Registered electors		1,25,021		▲54.43
JP gain from INC		Swing	▼4.64	

=== Assembly Election 1972 ===
1972 Maharashtra Legislative Assembly election : Khetwadi
Party	Candidate	Votes	%	±%
INC	Anant Namjoshi	29,075	59.69%	▲24.38
ABJS	Lakh Ni Jivanlal Mulchand	9,171	18.83%	▲9.37
CPI	Gangaram Laxman Reddy	4,373	8.98%	▼16.12
INC(O)	Dwarkadas Varjlal Vora	3,062	6.29%	New
SSP	Baba Dinanath Kalgutkar	2,566	5.27%	New
Independent	Abdul Rasulmiya Malik	459	0.94%	New
Margin of victory		19,904	40.87%	▲30.65
Turnout		49,625	61.30%	▼5.86
Total valid votes		48,706		
Registered electors		80,958		▲1.83
INC hold		Swing	▲24.38	

=== Assembly Election 1967 ===
1967 Maharashtra Legislative Assembly election : Khetwadi
Party	Candidate	Votes	%	±%
INC	M. N. Gogate	18,538	35.31%	New
CPI	G. L. Reddy	13,175	25.10%	New
PSP	P. V. Mandlik	10,749	20.48%	New
SWA	B. R. Shroff	5,066	9.65%	New
ABJS	D. L. Bhatt	4,966	9.46%	New
Margin of victory		5,363	10.22%	
Turnout		54,347	68.36%	
Total valid votes		52,494		
Registered electors		79,504		
INC win (new seat)				

== See also ==
- List of constituencies of Maharashtra Legislative Assembly
