= Prem Kumar Sharma =

Indian politician

Prem Kumar Shankardat Sharma was leader of Bharatiya Janata Party in Mumbai Maharashtra, in India. In 1985 he was elected as a member of Maharashtra Legislative Assembly from Khetwadi (Vidhan Sabha constituency). He was re-elected for second time in 1990. He was shot dead in June 1993. He had contested 1991 Lok Sabha election against Murli Deora.

== See also ==
- List of assassinated Indian politicians
