= Rangilpur =

Coordinates: 30°55′N 76°33′E

- Village
- Interactive map of Rangilpur
- Country: India
- State: Punjab
- District: Gurdaspur
- Tehsil: Batala
- Region: Majha

Government
  - Type: Panchayat raj
  - Body: Gram panchayat

Area
  - Total: 83 ha (210 acres)

Population (2011)
  - Total: 746; 386/360 ♂/♀
  - Scheduled Castes: 187; 93/94 ♂/♀
  - Total Households: 153

Languages
  - Official: Punjabi
- Time zone: UTC+5:30 (IST)
- Telephone: 01871
- ISO 3166 code: IN-PB
- Vehicle registration: PB-18
- Website: gurdaspur.nic.in

Rangilpur is a village in Batala in Gurdaspur district of Punjab State, India. It is located 9 kilometres (5.6 mi) from sub district headquarter, 44 kilometres (27 mi) from district headquarter and 2 kilometres (1.2 mi) from Sri Hargobindpur. The village is administrated by Sarpanch an elected representative of the village.

== Demography ==
As of 2011, the village has a total number of 153 houses and a population of 746 of which 386 are males while 360 are females. According to the report published by Census India in 2011, out of the total population of the village 187 people are from Schedule Caste and the village does not have any Schedule Tribe population so far.

== See also ==
- List of villages in India
