= Baldev Singh Mann =

Indian politician (1958–1986)

Personal details
- Born: Baldev Maan; 9 July 1952 Bagga Kalan, Punjab, India
- Died: 26 September 1986 (aged 34) Bagga Kalan, Amritsar district
- Cause of death: Killed by Khalistani militants
- Party: Communist Party of India (Marxist–Leninist) New Democracy
- Spouse: Paramjit Kaur
- Children: Sonia Mann
- Occupation: Editor of Hirawal Dasta

Baldev Singh Mann was an Indian left-wing activist of the Communist Party of India (Marxist–Leninist) New Democracy. He was a state-level leader of Kirti Kisan Union and the editor of Hirawal Dasta, a revolutionary journal of the Naxalites.

On 26 September 1986, during the insurgency in Punjab, India, he was killed by Sikh militants while on his way to his village, Bagga Kalan, in Amritsar district. His daughter is actress Sonia Mann.

== Life ==
Baldev Mann was born on 9 July 1952. He was the son of Inder Singh. He lived in the village Bagga Kalan, Ajnala tehsil, Amritsar district. After completing his primary education at the village school, he matriculated from the government high school at Raja Sansi. Mann then went to Khalsa College, Amritsar, during which he faced detention from college during the time of 'the Emergency', and graduated in 1983.

While at Day College, he came in contact with the Communist Party of India (Marxist–Leninist) New Democracy. He organized young people in his village under the banner of 'Naujawan Bharat Sabha', a left-wing Indian association that sought to instigate revolution against by gathering together workers and peasant youths. He turned it into a district-wide youth movement in Amritsar.

While at Amritsar, he was held and tortured at Amritsar's interrogation center, but released in 1975.

Approximately two years before his death, Mann married Paramjit Kaur, with whom he had a daughter Sonia Mann. She was one week old when he was killed while on his way to his village, Chinna Bagga, in Amritsar. Baldev Singh Mann was killed while on his way to visit his family. He wrote a letter to his daughter shortly before his death, stating "I am struggling for the birth of a social order in which the shackles that enslave human beings are broken to bits, where the oppressed can heave a sigh of relief".

== See also ==
- Arjan Singh Mastana
- Darshan Singh, Canadian
- Deepak Dhawan
- Jaimal Singh Padda
- Nidhan Singh Gudhan
- Pash
- Teja Singh Swatantar
- Punjab insurgency
- Communist Party of India (Marxist–Leninist) New Democracy
