= Langeri =

- Village
- Location in Punjab, India Langeri (India)
- Coordinates: 31.1752602°N 75.9288794°E
- Country: India
- State: Punjab
- District: Shaheed Bhagat Singh Nagar

Government
  - Type: Panchayat raj
  - Body: Gram panchayat
- Elevation: 251 m (823 ft)

Population (2011)
  - Total: 1,526
- Sex ratio 793/733 ♂/♀

Languages
  - Official: Punjabi
- Time zone: UTC+5:30 (IST)
- PIN: 144504
- Telephone code: 01884
- ISO 3166 code: IN-PB
- Post office: Behram
- Website: nawanshahr.nic.in

Langeri is a village in Shaheed Bhagat Singh Nagar district of Punjab State, India. It is located 6.4 kilometres (4.0 mi) away from postal head office Behram, 8 kilometres (5.0 mi) from Banga, 19 kilometres (12 mi) from district headquarter Shaheed Bhagat Singh Nagar and 112 kilometres (70 mi) from state capital Chandigarh. The village is administrated by Sarpanch an elected representative of the village.

== Demography ==
As of 2011, Langeri has a total number of 331 houses and population of 1526 of which 793 include are males while 733 are females according to the report published by Census India in 2011. The literacy rate of Langeri is 77.44%, higher than the state average of 75.84%. The population of children under the age of 6 years is 161 which is 10.55% of total population of Langeri, and child sex ratio is approximately 917 as compared to Punjab state average of 846.

Most of the people are from Schedule Caste which constitutes 69.53% of total population in Langeri. The town does not have any Schedule Tribe population so far.

As per the report published by Census India in 2011, 458 people were engaged in work activities out of the total population of Langeri which includes 422 males and 36 females. According to census survey report 2011, 41.70% workers describe their work as main work and 58.30% workers are involved in Marginal activity providing livelihood for less than 6 months.

== Education ==
The village has a Punjabi medium, co-ed upper primary school founded in 1944. The schools provide mid-day meal as per Indian Midday Meal Scheme. As per Right of Children to Free and Compulsory Education Act the school provide free education to children between the ages of 6 and 14. Amardeep Singh Shergill Memorial college Mukandpur and Sikh National College Banga are the nearest colleges.

== Transport ==
Banga train station is the nearest train station however, Phagwara Junction railway station is 37 kilometres (23 mi) away from the village. Sahnewal Airport is the nearest domestic airport which located 87 kilometres (54 mi) away in Ludhiana and the nearest international airport is located in Chandigarh also Sri Guru Ram Dass Jee International Airport is the second nearest airport which is 149 kilometres (93 mi) away in Amritsar.

== See also ==
- List of villages in India
