= Darshan Singh Canadian =

Indian politician

Personal details
- Born: Darshan A. Sangha; 1917 Langeri, Punjab, India
- Died: September 25, 1986 (aged 68–69) India
- Cause of death: Assassination
- Party: Communist Party of India; Communist Party of Canada
- Other political affiliations: Labor-Progressive Party
- Spouse: Harbans Kaur
- Occupation: Trade union activist

Darshan Singh Canadian (born Darshan A. Sangha in 1917 – 25 September 1986) was a Sikh trade union activist and communist organizer in Canada and India.

== Canada ==
Darshan Singh Canadian immigrated to Vancouver, Canada in 1937. Upon his arrival, his uncle attempted to get him a job at Dominion Sawmills, resulting in the uncle being fired and Sangha being hired at five cents less pay an hour. He became active in the Labor-Progressive Party (as the Communist Party of Canada was known). He was one of the founders of the International Woodworkers of America and served as one of the union's organizers as well as its general secretary from 1942 to 1946. He led striking woodworkers on a march on the provincial capital of Victoria in 1946. He fought for the rights of B.C.'s East Indian woodworkers.

== Return to India ==
Darshan Singh Canadian returned to India upon its independence in 1947 and adopted "Canadian" as his surname.

He became active in the Communist Party of India (CPI) becoming party secretary in Punjab. Canadian was a powerful speaker, and addressed several meetings and mass rallies. He also served as the secretary of Punjab Kisan Sabha. He opposed the Khalistani separatists among the NRI Sikhs, and actively campaigned against them through his articles and speeches. He represented Garhshankar Assembly constituency in Hoshiarpur district as member of Punjab State Legislature for two terms from 1972 to 1980. He was assassinated in 1986, in retaliation for his comments against Khalistani militants.

Darshan Singh married Harbans, the daughter of Baba Lal Singh, a Ghadar veteran from Jandiala in Jalandhar district. His two daughters settled in Britain and Canada. In his last years, he suffered from spondylitis and other health problems, and once went to USSR for treatment.

== Death ==
On the afternoon of 25 September, Darshan Singh was killed by Sikh militants during the insurgency in Punjab, India. Within two hours of his death, about a thousand demonstrators gathered at the police station at Mahilpur, and blocked the way to Hoshiarpur. They protested against police inactivity, and even accused the police of complicity in the crime.

On 26 September, a huge march was organized from his native village Langeri to Mahilpur. The people shouted slogans as "Darshan Singh Canadian Amar Rahe" (Long Live Darshan Singh Canadian), "Canadian aman ekta da shahid" (Canadian was a martyr to peace and unity), "Na Hindu Raj na Khalistan, jug jive Hindustan" (Neither Hindu Raj nor Khalistan, long live India), "Hindu Sikh noon jo ladaye, oh desh da vairi hai" (he who makes Hindus and Sikhs fight, is an enemy of the nation), "atvad wakhwad murdabad" (down with extremism and secessionism), "Lokan da ekta zindabad" (Long live public unity), "Hindu Sikh ekta zindabad" (Long live Hindu-Sikh unity), and "CPI zindabad" (Long live CPI). From Mahilapur, the procession came back to Langeri. A 20,000-strong rally was held in the village school ground, where Canadian's body lay. Thousands of Sikh youth participated in the rally, denouncing the extremist killers.

His body was cremated after several leaders, including the SGPC President, paid their tributes to him.

== See also ==
- Baldev Singh Mann
- Deepak Dhawan
- Gursharan Singh (theatre director)
- Jaimal Singh Padda
- Nidhan Singh Gudhan
- Pash
- Teja Singh Swatantar
- Punjab insurgency
