= Bagga Kalan =

- Village
- Location in Punjab, India Bagga Kalan (India)
- Coordinates: 30.9562853°N 75.7455719°E
- Country: India
- State: Punjab
- District: Ludhiana
- Tehsil: Ludhiana West

Government
  - Type: Panchayati raj (India)
  - Body: Gram panchayat

Languages
  - Official: Punjabi
  - Other spoken: Hindi
- Time zone: UTC+5:30 (IST)
- Telephone code: 0161
- ISO 3166 code: IN-PB
- Vehicle registration: PB-10
- Website: ludhiana.nic.in

Bagga Kalan is a village located in the Ludhiana West tehsil, of Ludhiana district, Punjab.

== Administration ==
The village is administrated by a Sarpanch who is an elected representative of village as per constitution of India and Panchayati raj (India).

Particulars	Total	Male	Female
Total No. of Houses	79		
Population	437	240	197
Child (0–6)	75	45	30
Schedule Caste	113	57	56
Schedule Tribe	0	0	0
Literacy	66.57%	70.26%	62.28%
Total Workers	163	116	47
Main Worker	121	0	0
Marginal Worker	42	6	36

== Cast ==
The village constitutes 25.86% of Schedule Caste and the village doesn't have any Schedule Tribe population.

== Air travel connectivity ==
The closest airport to the village is Sahnewal Airport.
