= Hit Abhilashi =

Indian politician

Hit Abhilashi was a leader of Bharatiya Janata Party from Punjab, India. He was a cabinet minister of the state from 1977 to 1980. He was killed by suspected militants in 1988. He was president of the Punjab chapter of the Bharatiya Janata Party when killed.
