= Talwandi Salem =

- Village
- Location in Punjab, India Talwandi Salem (India)
- Coordinates: 31.194269°N 75.4115939°E
- Country: India
- State: Punjab
- District: Jalandhar
- Tehsil: Nakodar

Government
  - Type: Panchayat raj
  - Body: Gram panchayat
- Elevation: 240 m (790 ft)

Population (2011)
  - Total: 1,222
- Sex ratio 600/622 ♂/♀

Languages
  - Official: Punjabi
- Time zone: UTC+5:30 (IST)
- ISO 3166 code: IN-PB
- Vehicle registration: PB- 08
- Website: jalandhar.nic.in

Talwandi Salem is a village in Nakodar in Jalandhar district of Punjab State, India. It is located 10.7 kilometres (6.6 mi) from Nakodar, 24.7 kilometres (15.3 mi) from Kapurthala, 25 kilometres (16 mi) from district headquarter Jalandhar and 165 kilometres (103 mi) from state capital Chandigarh. The village is administrated by a sarpanch who is an elected representative of village as per Panchayati raj (India).

== Demography ==
As of 2011, the village has a total number of 279 houses and a population of 1222 of which include 600 are males while 622 are females according to the report published by Census India in 2011. The literacy rate of the village is 80.76%, higher than state average of 75.84%. The population of children under the age of 6 years is 136 which is 11.13% of total population of the village, and child sex ratio is approximately 1030 higher than the state average of 846.

Most of the people are from Schedule Caste which constitutes 29.71% of total population in the village. The town does not have any Schedule Tribe population so far.

As per census 2011, 383 people were engaged in work activities out of the total population of the village which includes 286 males and 97 females. According to census survey report 2011, 91.64% workers describe their work as main work and 8.36% workers are involved in marginal activity providing livelihood for less than 6 months.

== Transport ==
Nakodar railway station is the nearest train station. The village is 72 kilometres (45 mi) away from domestic airport in Ludhiana and the nearest international airport is located in Chandigarh also Sri Guru Ram Dass Jee International Airport is the second nearest airport which is 105 kilometres (65 mi) away in Amritsar.
