= Rajoana =

Villages in Punjab, India

Rajoana Kalan and Rajoana Khurd are villages in the Ludhiana district, Punjab, India.

== Rajoana Kalan ==
Rajoana Kalan has an official area of 562 Hectares and a population of 1,239 persons in 1991, and is in the local administration ward of Sudhar, 18 km from Mullanpur and not far from the towns of Jagraon and Moga.

Rajoana Kalan is off the main road from Mullanpur to Raikot, between the River/Canal at Sudhar and Raikot, approximately two or three miles from Sudhar. Halwara village and the Halwara Air Force Base is even closer to village of Rajoana Kalan. Rajoana Kalan is located to the West of Ludhiana in Punjab. For directions from Ludhiana, turn left off the Firozepur Road at the town of Mullanpur to Raikot. The road to Rajoana Kalan is the turning to the right at a brick kiln works off the main road running between Mullanpur to Raikot, after passing through the village of Halwara and the Indian Air force base located there, and passing through the village/township of Sudhar.

== Rajoana Khurd ==
Rajoana Khurd has an official area of 389 Hectares and a population of 1,616 in 1991, and is in the same local administration ward of Sudhar.

The ancestry of the village and the people is of Jat Sikhs bearing the family name or surname of Natt. Natt’s of Rajoana Kalan, can be traced back to a woman known as Mai Bhatti.

Mai Bhatti was daughter of a rich landowner – zamindar or Sardar – who gave her and her husband large areas of land surrounding the present village. Mai Bhatti and her husband had three sons. Reference to her husband and what happened to him is yet to be determined. She lived during the life and times of Guru Gobind Singh. History has it that when Guru Gobind Singh was engaged in the guerrilla war with the ruling Mughals in Delhi, he came to the place where Mai Bhatti lived with her three sons.

He was without horse and or any carriage, and requested one to be found for him. He spent the night there and the next morning Mai Bhatti together with her three sons gave a lift to Guru Gobind Singh on a Manji (a small light cot / bed). This was a form of transport carriage in those days.

Guru Gobind Singh found that one end of the Manji dipped lower than the other three, but could not see the reason for this. He asked the oldest son what the reason was and was told that it was because his mother, Mai Bhatti was bearing that end of the Manji.

Guru Gobind Singh was extremely pleased and impressed with this demonstration of support from Mai Bhatti, and told her to ask for any reward she may wish for. Being a simple person, she asked that each of her sons find a bride and get married.

Guru Gobind Singh was amused by the simplicity of her wishes and said that the sons would marry not only once but twice! He told Mai Bhatti to ask for something else – probably expecting a materialistic request – but keeping to her simple lifestyle, she said that once the sons were married if they could be blessed to be able to earn a living for their family.

Guru Gobind Singh was once again pleased with the simple demand and blessed her sons with the prophecy that they would settle a village each.

Today there are three villages originating from that one family – firstly, Rajoana Kalan (the main village), secondly Chotta Rajoana (small Rajoana) also known officially as Rajoana Khurd, and thirdly the village of Tugal.

There is a memorial plaque with details of Mai Bhatti’s place in Sikh history at the entrance to the Kila (the castle) in Rajoana Kalan.

Initially all the families and descendants of Mai Bhatti’s sons lived within the Kila. This was in tradition of living in the large household of the ruling Sardars and in times of conflict back during the village’s history, it was a prudent thing to do.

In the passage of time and as the size of the family increased, segments of the families slowly started to take up residence in the village, outside the Kila. This was a practical proposition, however it probably led to the relaxing of relationships and weakening of them.

Balwant Singh Rajoana, convicted in the killing of Beant Singh, belongs to village Rajoana Kalan.
