= Bhalaipur =

- Village
- Location in Punjab, India Bhalaipur (India)
- Coordinates: 31.621548°N 75.215817°E
- Country: India
- State: Punjab
- District: Kapurthala

Government
  - Type: Panchayati raj (India)
  - Body: Gram panchayat

Population (2011)
  - Total: 166
- Sex ratio 84/82♂/♀

Languages
  - Official: Punjabi
  - Other spoken: Hindi
- Time zone: UTC+5:30 (IST)
- PIN: 144602
- Telephone code: 01822
- ISO 3166 code: IN-PB
- Vehicle registration: PB-09
- Website: kapurthala.gov.in

Bhalaipur is a village in Kapurthala district of Punjab State, India. It is located 13 kilometres (8.1 mi) from Kapurthala, which is both district and sub-district headquarters of Bhalaipur. The village is administrated by a Sarpanch who is an elected representative of village as per the constitution of India and Panchayati raj (India).

== Demography ==
According to the report published by Census India in 2011, Bhalaipur has a total number of 30 houses and population of 166 of which include 84 males and 82 females. Literacy rate of Bhalaipur is 71.72%, lower than state average of 75.84%. The population of children under the age of 6 years is 21 which is 12.65% of total population of Bhalaipur, and child sex ratio is approximately 1100, higher than state average of 846.

== Population data ==
Particulars	Total	Male	Female
Total No. of Houses	30	-	-
Population	166	84	82
Child (0–6)	21	10	11
Schedule Caste	53	28	25
Schedule Tribe	0	0	0
Literacy	71.72 %	78.38 %	64.79 %
Total Workers	64	57	7
Main Worker	59	0	0
Marginal Worker	5	2	3

== Air travel connectivity ==
The closest airport to the village is Sri Guru Ram Dass Jee International Airport.
