= K. K. Rema =

Indian politician

Member of the Kerala Legislative Assembly
- Incumbent
- Assumed office 25 May 2021
- Preceded by: C. K. Nanu
- Constituency: Vadakara

Personal details
- Born: 6 May 1970 (age 56) Naduvannur, Kozhikode, Kerala, India
- Party: Revolutionary Marxist Party of India
- Spouse: T. P. Chandrasekharan (m. 1994; died 2012)
- Children: Abhinand Chandrasekharan
- Education: Malabar Christian College, Kozhikode

Koncha Kandi Rema (born 6 May 1970) is an Indian politician and activist from Kerala. She is associated with the Revolutionary Marxist Party of India. She is the widow of RMPI founder late T. P. Chandrasekharan. She has contested from Vadakara constituency in Kerala during the state assembly elections of 2021 and won with a margin of 7491 votes. She retained the seat for RMPI in the 2026 Kerala Legislative Assembly election.

== Personal life and education ==
Rema was born in Naduvannur village of Kozhikode district in Kerala to K. K. Madhavan and Dakshayani Amma. She did her primary schooling from Kavumthara AUP School and completed pre-degree from Zamorin's Guruvayurappan College, Kozhikode. Subsequently, she earned B.A. in History degree from Malabar Christian College. She managed to complete the JDC course while being actively part of the communist movement. Her marriage to T. P. Chandrasekharan was arranged within the party outlook which took place on 16 October 1994. Later on, she joined the Vadakara Cooperative Rural Bank and was serving as the branch manager while the state assembly polls of 2021 were due.

== Political activism ==
She served as the state vice president of SFI and was a state committee member in the 90s. Rema has been active in the local party activities in and around Vadakara, where she has been married till 2012. She has been a crusader against murder and rape in Kerala and a strong voice in favor of women's rights in the last decade.

Her husband, T. P. Chandrasekharan was killed on 4 May 2012 for being a vocal critic and a fighting force against the CPI(M). Following her husband's death, she contested the Vadakara seat in the 2016 Kerala Legislative assembly election but she had to finish at third position with a vote share of more than 20000 votes.

RMP and different political organisations in other states came together and established the RMPI, which was registered with the election commission in 2017. In 2021, K K Rema faced the assembly elections from Vadakara constituency supported by the UDF and became the first MLA of RMPI. She is the first female to win from the constituency. She won the Vatakara Constituency in the 2021 Kerala Legislative Assembly election and retained it in the 2026 Kerala Legislative Assembly election. In 2021, she polled 65,093 and defeated her nearest rival, Manayath Chandran of the Loktantrik Janata Dal, an ally of the LDF. In 2026, she polled 70,117 votes and defeated M K Bhaskaran of the Rashtriya Janata Dal, by a margin of 14,862 votes. She contested and lost the Vadakara seat in 2016 Assembly election.
