= Baswaria =

Basauli, India Baswaria or Basuari
- Village
- Location within Bihar Location within India
- Coordinates: 26.2833°N 86.4667°E
- Country: India
- State: Bihar
- District: Madhubani district
- Named for: The Baswaria plant

Government
  - Type: Panchayati raj (India)
  - Body: Gram panchayat

Population (2011)
  - Total: 12,413

Languages
  - Official: Hindi
- Time zone: UTC+5:30 (IST)
- Postal code: 847402
- ISO 3166 code: IN-BR

Basauli also known as Basuari or Baswaria is a large village located in Madhubani Block of Madhubani district, Bihar with total 2427 families residing. The Basauli village has population of 12413 of which 6434 are males while 5979 are females as per Population Census 2011.

== Demographics ==
In Basauli village, the population of children aged 0–6 years is 2,381, constituting 19.18% of the total population. The average sex ratio in Basauli village is 929, which is higher than the Bihar state average of 918. However, the child sex ratio in Basauli stands at 931, which is slightly lower than the Bihar state average of 935.

The literacy rate in Basauli village is lower compared to the state average. In 2011, the literacy rate of Basauli was 52.53%, while Bihar's literacy rate was 61.80%. Amongst the male population in Basauli, the literacy rate is 61.55%, whereas the female literacy rate is considerably lower at 42.83%.

According to the Constitution of India and the Panchayati Raj Act, Basauli village is administered by a Sarpanch, who is the elected head of the village.

== Caste Factor ==
Schedule Caste (SC) constitutes 11.35% of total population in Basauli village. The village Basauli currently does not have any Schedule Tribe (ST) population.
