= B. N. Kumar =

Indian general

- Died: 7 November 1988 Chandigarh, India
- Allegiance: India
- Branch: Indian Army
- Rank: Major General

Major General B. N. Kumar was an Indian Army officer. He was chairman of Bhakra Beas Management Board (BBMB). He was shot dead by Khalistani militants in Chandigarh on 7 November 1988.
