= Revolutionary Marxist Party of India =

Political party in India

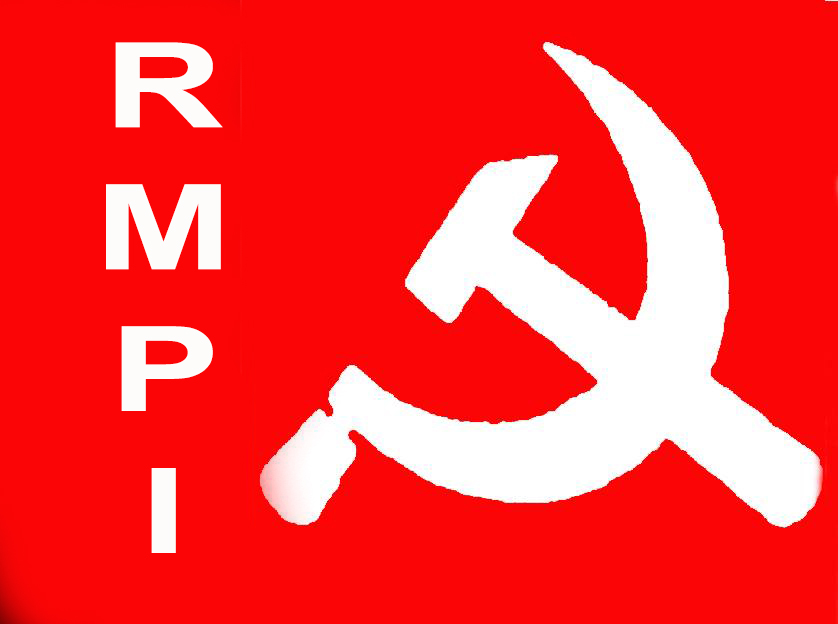
- Abbreviation: RMPI
- General Secretary: Mangat Ram Pasla
- Founded: 2016; 10 years ago
- Preceded by: Revolutionary Marxist Party
- Headquarters: Shaheed Sarwan Singh Cheema Trust, 352/1, PhagwariMohalla, Garha, Jalandhar, Punjab - 144022.
- Newspaper: Sangrami Lehar
- Student wing: Punjab Student Federation Convener Gagandeep Mansa Progress student's federation (PSF)andhrapradesh
- Youth wing: Shaheed Bhagat Singh Youth Federation Now General Secretary Dharminder Singh Mukerian; Revolutionary Youth (Kerala)
- Women's wing: All India Democratic Women's Federation
- Labour wing: Revolutionary Marxist Party Union
- Peasant's wing: Jamhoori Kisan Sabha
- Ideology: Communism; Marxism-Leninism
- Political position: Left-wing
- ECI status: Registered - Unrecognized
- Alliance: UDF
- Seats in Rajya Sabha: 0 / 245
- Seats in Lok Sabha: 0 / 543
- Seats in Kerala Legislative Assembly: 1 / 140

Website
- www.rmpi.in

The Revolutionary Marxist Party of India (RMPI) is a Marxist-Leninist party political party in India.

The party is based on Marxism, mixed with some Leninism. The party formed via the merger of Kerala-based Revolutionary Marxist Party with other parties with similar goals. Most of the parties that were merged were communist or Marxist. The parties that merged in 2016 were CPM Punjab, CPM Haryana, Chandigarh Marxist Party, Himachal Marxist Party, Chhattisgarh Marxist Party, Tamil Nadu Marxist Party, Andhra Marxist Party, West Bengal Marxist Party, and Delhi Marxist Party. The leaders of RMPI are Mangat Ram Pasla and K. K. Rema. The first All India Conference of Revolutionary Marxist Party Of India (RMPI) held at Chandigarh from November 23 to 26, 2017. The headquarters for the party are located in Jalandhar.

== Electoral performance ==
Kerala Legislative Assembly election results
| Election Year | Alliance | Seats contested | Seats won | Total Votes | Percentage of votes | +/- Vote |
|---|---|---|---|---|---|---|
| 2021 | UDF | 1 | 1 / 140 | 65,093 | 47.63 % | New |
| 2026 | UDF | 1 | 1 / 140 | 70,117 | 48.97 % | ▲ |
