= Balwant Singh Rajoana =

Convicted Indian assassin

- Born: 23 August 1967 (age 59); Rajoana Kalan, Punjab, India
- Citizenship: Indian
- Occupation: Former Police constable
- Known for: Participation in the conspiracy to kill Beant Singh

Balwant Singh Rajoana was convicted for the assassination of Beant Singh (former Chief Minister of Punjab) on 31 August 1995. Rajoana was sentenced to death on 1 August 2007 by a special CBI court in Chandigarh. Beant Singh was killed by Balwant Singh's associate Dilawar Singh Babbar and Balwant Singh was the backup human bomb to be used had Dilawar failed in his mission.

Although Rajoana was arrested, convicted, and sentenced to death for his involvement in the assassination, his execution has been stayed multiple times due to various legal proceedings and appeals.

== Early years ==
Balwant Singh Rajoana was born in Rajoana Kalan village near Raikot in Ludhiana district of Punjab in a Sikh family on 23 August 1967. As a child, he was fond of reading ghazals, novels and poetry. The works of Surjit Paatar and Jaswant Singh Kanwal played an important role in shaping his ideology. He was adopted by Jaswant Singh in 1993, a military veteran, after his father Malkeet Singh died. Rajoana joined the Punjab Police on 1 October 1987 and was a constable but became under the influence of Babbar Khalsa International and blamed Beant Singh for extrajudicial killings of Sikh youth and believed his siblings Harpinder Singh Goldy and Amandeep Kaur were killed by the Punjab police.

== Assassination of Beant Singh ==
In Punjab between 1992 and 1995, at a time when the Khalistan separatist movement was active in the state and the Indian government was aggressively seeking to control the movement. It is alleged that, during Beant Singh's tenure, upwards of twenty-five thousand of Sikh civilians disappeared or were killed and their bodies cremated by the police in extrajudicial executions. Rajoana, who was a police constable at that time, conspired with Dilawar Singh Jaisinghvala, a police officer, to kill Beant Singh. Based on a coin toss, Dilawar Singh Jaisinghvala was chosen to be the suicide bomber with Rajoana as a backup. The attack on 31 August 1995 resulted in the death of Beant Singh and 17 others, and, on 25 December 1997, Rajoana confessed his involvement.

== Conviction and death sentence ==
Balwant Singh had "openly confessed" an involvement and strongly expressed no faith in Indian judiciary. He refused to defend himself and refused to take a lawyer. He accused Indian courts of applying dual standards of law and the Indian judicial system of shielding the culprits of 1984 anti-Sikh riots. "Asking for mercy from them (Indian courts) is not even in my distant dreams" Rajoana said in an open letter to Media.

Explaining his actions, Balwant Singh referred to the deadly anti-Sikh genocide which followed the assassination of Indira Gandhi and talked about how the perpetrators of the riots had not been brought to justice even after 25 years. In a letter to the Chief Justice of the High Court, he complained about discrimination at the hands of the country's judicial system and the rulers. Rajoana defended his actions citing the 1984 Operation Blue Star offensive at the Golden Temple and the killing of Sikhs during the 1984 anti-Sikh riots.

Rajoana was sentenced to death by a special CBI court and his execution was scheduled for 31 March 2012. In his will, Balwant Singh said that his wish was to donate his eyes to Lakhwinder Singh (Ragi at Golden Temple Amritsar) and his kidneys, heart or any other body part to needy patients. On 28 March 2012 India's Home Ministry stayed the execution following clemency appeals filed by the SGPC (mercy petition), a Sikh organization.

On stay of his execution, Balwant singh Rajoana said:

I have dedicated my life to the Panth (referred to Khalsa and meaning the Sikh Community) and have no regrets. So the stay doesn't make any difference to me ... This is a victory of real Khalsa Panth after every member of the Sikh Community rose to the occasion and successfully conveyed the strength of the Khalsa religion. I am ready to be hanged at any time and will live as long as God has decided for me. My happiness over the stay shouldn't be considered as my weakness. I am happy because Sikh Community has shocked the walls of the Delhi government, not because my hanging has been postponed.

— Balwant Singh Rajoana

On the 550th birth anniversary of Guru Nanak in September 2019, the Central Government recommended commuting his death sentence by the President under Section 72 of the Indian Constitution. However, the potential release of Rajoana is opposed by the family of the murdered Beant Singh, including his grandson Ravneet Singh Bittu. In December 2019, Union Home Minister Amit Shah said in the Lok Sabha that death sentence of Balwant Singh Rajoana, a convict in the assassination case of former Punjab Chief Minister Beant Singh, has not been commuted. "The sentence has not been commuted," he told the Parliamentarians in the Lower House today. Shah also urged the fellow members not to go by media reports which have stated that the ministry has recommended commuting the death sentence of Rajoana and the communication had been sent to Punjab government and Chandigarh administration. Shah made the remarks after the matter was raised by the Congress members and the grandson of late Beant Singh, Ravneet Singh Bittu during the question hour in the lower house. Bittu said that the members on Monday had demanded death sentence for those convicted in heinous cases against women but Rajoana's death sentence was sought to be commuted. He also sought a response from the Home Minister. Rajoana sent an appeal to the Supreme Court of India.

For his legal battles, he received financial support from the Shiromani Gurdwara Parbandhak Committee and Shiromani Akali Dal. He is imprisoned at Patiala Central Jail. In 2022, he was briefly released from prison for an hour to attend his adoptive father's funeral at Gurdwara Baba Deep Singh, Ludhiana and urged the population to vote for the Shiromani Akali Dal political party in a then upcoming Punjab election.

== Awards ==
On 23 March 2012, he was awarded the title of "Living Martyr" (Jinda Shaheed) by Akal Takhat, the highest temporal seat of the Khalsa. Rajoana initially refused to accept the title, but later on 27 March, he accepted the title, saying that it will make him "more determined" towards his goals. Dilawar Singh Babbar was also awarded the title of "National Martyr" in the same order from Akal Takhat.
