= Onchiam =

Onchiyam
- village
- Location in Kerala, India Onchiyam (India)
- Coordinates: 11°39′25″N 75°35′20″E
- Country: India
- State: Kerala
- District: Kozhikode

Population (2011)
  - Total: 28,650

Languages
  - Official: Malayalam, English
- Time zone: UTC+5:30 (IST)
- PIN: 673308
- Vehicle registration: KL-18

Onchiyam is a village in Kozhikode district in the state of Kerala, India.

== Demographics ==
As of a 2011 India census, Onchiyam had a population of 28650 with 13224 males and 15426 females.

== See also ==
- Madappally
- Orkkatteri
- Azhiyur
- Vatakara
