= Jaimal Singh Padda =

Indian poet, communist activist

- Jaimal Singh Padda reciting his poem Una Mitterandi Yaad Pyari

Personal details
- Born: 1943 Lakhan Ke Padda, Punjab, India
- Died: 17 March 1988 Lakhan Ke Padda, Punjab, India
- Cause of death: Killed by Khalistan movement extremists
- Party: Communist Party of India (Marxist–Leninist)
- Spouse: Amarjit Kaur
- Children: 3
- Occupation: Writer, poet, activist

Jaimal Singh Padda was an Indian writer, poet and communist activist. He was shot dead on 17 March 1988 in Lakhan ka Padda village, Kapurthala district by Khalistan movement extremists. He was filmed reciting his poem "Una Mitterandi Yaad Pyari", before his death, by Anand Patwardhan in his documentary In Memory of Friends.

During Punjab insurgency, Jaimal Padda had been vocal against both the Sikh and the Hindu fundamentalists and campaigned against both. His slogan was “Naa Hindu Raaj, Naa Khalistan, Raaj Karega Mazdoor Kisaan” (Neither Hindu state, nor Khalistan, we want the working class to rule). On 17 March 1988, the shooters belonging to Khalistan Commando Force (KCF) shot him outside his house.

== See also ==
- Baldev Singh Mann
- Darshan Singh Canadian
- Deepak Dhawan
- Nidhan Singh Gudhan
- Pash
- Teja Singh Swatantar
- Punjab insurgency
- Communist Party of India (Marxist-Leninist)
