= Gursharan Singh (theatre director) =

Indian theatre director

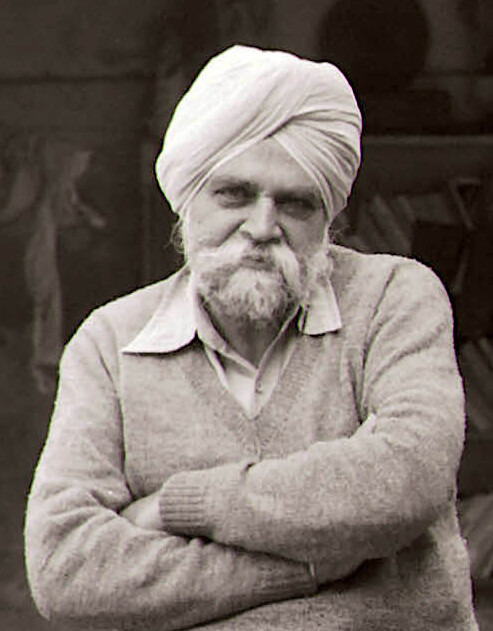
- Gursharan Singh in Amritsar in 1986
- Born: 16 September 1929; Multan, British India (now Pakistan)
- Died: 27 September 2011 (aged 82); Chandigarh, India
- Occupations: Writer, playwright, theatre activist
- Organization: Amritsar Natak Kala Kendra (estb. 1964)
- Writing career
- Years active: 1958-2011
- Period: 20th century
- Genre: Drama
- Notable awards: Sangeet Natak Akademi Award (1993); Kalidasa Samman (2004); Sangeet Natak Akademi Fellowship (2006)
- Website: gursharansinghtrust.org

Gursharan Singh (September 16, 1929 – September 27, 2011) was an Indian writer, playwright, actor, political activist and progressive director of Punjabi theatre. He employed street theatre for his activism, and developed a form of street and rural theatre, commonly known as Awami Rangmanch (People's Theatre) Popularly known as Gursharan Bhaji and Bhai Manna Singh, he founded the Amritsar Natak Kala Kendra in 1964 and helped establish the Punjab Lok Sabhyacharak Manch in 1981. Starting in the 1970s, he, along with his troupe, performed through villages of Punjab for over 150 nights a year, performing even during the periods of the Emergency (1975–1977), and the Punjab insurgency of the 1980s–1990s. In a career spanning six decades, he wrote over a hundred plays in Punjabi, including Hit List, Ek Kursi, Ek Morcha, and Hawa Mein Latke Log, and trained a generation of theatre artists.

He received the 'Best Playwright Award' of the Punjabi Academy, Ludhiana, in 1990, the Sangeet Natak Akademi Award for playwriting in 1993, the Kalidas Samman given by the Government of Madhya Pradesh in 2004, and the highest award of the Akademi the Sangeet Natak Akademi Fellowship in 2006.

== Biography ==
=== Early life and education ===
Born on 16 September 1929 in Multan, Punjab Province, British India (now in Pakistan), Singh attended primary school in Multan, where he studied Punjabi and Urdu. Subsequently, due to the Partition of India, his family migrated to Amritsar in 1947, where he completed his schooling at Khalsa School and Khalsa College, Amritsar (Guru Nanak Dev University), completing an M.Sc. (Honours) in Technical Chemistry.

=== Career ===
In 1951, Singh began working at the Bhakra–Nangal Dam project as a hydraulic engineer. It was during this period he wrote his first play Bhaiji.

He played the part of Bhai Manna Singh in a popular Punjabi TV drama of the same name on DD Punjabi, and became known by that name among residents of Punjab, India. He was also known as 'Gursharan Bhaji'. He appeared in Punjabi films like Man Jeete Jag Jeet (1973), where he played the role of Radha Saluja's father; Mutiyar (1979); and Soorma Bhagat (1993).

He took his Awami Rangmanch (people's theatre) to villages across Punjab throughout the Naxalite movement of the 1960s–1970s, the Emergency (1975–1977), and the Punjab insurgency of the 1980s–1990s, staging plays like Hit List, Ek Kursi, Ek Morcha, and Hawa Mein Latke Log, on social injustice, political repression and communal violence despite arrests and threats from extremist groups.

Singh won the Kalidasa Samman Award in 2004.

=== Personal life ===
Singh was married to theatre artist Kailash Kaur, who acted in his plays from 1959. The couple had two daughters, Navsharan Singh, a social activist, and Areet Kaur, who served as Director of Health Services in Punjab.He died in Chandigarh on 27 September 2011, aged 82.

== Legacy ==
His death anniversary, 27 September, is commemorated by theatre groups in Punjab as "Revolutionary Theatre Day". In 2019, his former residence in Chandigarh was converted into the 'Gursharan Singh Memorial Gallery', displaying photographs, manuscripts, and books related to his work.

== Filmography ==
- Man Jeete Jag Jeet (1973) as Gani ji
- Mutiyar (1979) as Master Ji
- Bhabo (1989) as Santa Singh Lambardar
- Soorma Bhagat (1993)
- Dastan-e-Punjab (TV series)
- Bhai Manna Singh on DD Punjabi
