= Deepak Dhawan =

Indian politician

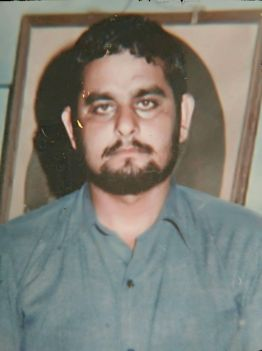

Punjab State Committee member, Communist Party of India (Marxist)

Personal details
- Born: February 28, 1955 Khem Karan, Punjab, India
- Died: May 19, 1987 (aged 32) Sangha, Punjab, India
- Cause of death: Killed by pro-Khalistan militants
- Party: Communist Party of India (Marxist)
- Height: 6.0 ft (183 cm)
- Education: Guru Nanak Dev University
- Occupation: Communist leader, activist, columnist

Deepak Dhawan (February 28, 1955 – May 19, 1987) was the State Committee member of the Communist Party of India (Marxist) (CPI(M)) representing Punjab and also Joint Secretary of Khet Mazdoor Union, a mass organisation of CPI(M), which campaigns for the rights of landless agricultural labourers. He was a member of All India Students' Federation (AISF) in D.A.V College, Amritsar, and an elected President of Student Council (Progressive Student Front - a united front of SFI and AISF) at Guru Nanak Dev University. On 19 May 1987, he was killed by Khalistan movement extremists at Sangha village, Tarn Taran district.

== Commemoration ==
On 19 June 2020, on the 33rd anniversary of his death, the Revolutionary Marxist Party of India launched a calendar to commemorate Dhawan.
