= Surinder Singh Sodhi =

Indian Sikh militant and assassin (1962–1984)

- Born: Surinder Singh Bains c. 1962; Village Kotli Bawa Dass, Bulhowal, Hoshiarpur, India
- Died: 14 April 1984 (aged 21–22); Amritsar, India
- Cause of death: Assassination
- Other name: Sodhi (Nickname)
- Occupations: Hitman; Chief bodyguard Transport minister
- Years active: 1982–1984
- Employer: Jarnail Singh Bhindranwale
- Organization: Damdami Taksal
- Known for: Right Hand of Sant Jarnail Singh Bhindranwale
- Movement: Khalistan Movement; Dharam Yudh Morcha

Surinder Singh Sodhi (c. 1962 – 14 April 1984) was a Sikh militant known for being the chief bodyguard, chief hitman, transport minister, and right-hand man of Jarnail Singh Bhindranwale.

== Early life ==
Sodhi was born in 1962 in village Kotli Bawa Dass, Hoshiarpur district in a Jatt Sikh family. He took Amrit and became a Khalsa early in his life. By 10, he had memorised the entire Nitnem. His raw name was Sodhi a shortened version of his name Surinder Singh. Sodhi also became a member of Harian Bela Nihang Dal where he learned Gatka, but left soon after and join Damdami Taksal where he got full Santhiya of Guru Granth Sahib. Not much is known about Sodhi's early life. He was a radio mechanic in his twenties and was said to be a fine marksman. He was known for his skill in driving motorcycles. Sodhi's friends said later that he had a tape of kirtan playing everywhere he would go. When asked why, Sodhi said, "No one knows what may happen, when death will come. I want a peaceful death. If I get killed, at least my ears will be filled with the sound of kirtan, not the sound of bullets."

== Clash with Nirankari ==
On 27 August 1981, Surinder Singh Sodhi was involved in a clash with Nirankaris. A group of Nirankaris allegedly made disrespectful remarks about the Chola of Sodhi and some Nihangs. In response, Sodhi grabbed a rake and began beating the group, injuring 15 and leading to his arrest. The officer who had arrested Sodhi was called by Bhindranwale, who demanded the immediate release of Sodhi. The arresting officer complied and Sodhi was released.

== Joining Jarnail Singh Bhindranwale ==
The first time Sodhi met Bhindranwale after his release they are said to have hugged each other. Bhindranwale praised Sodhi for his work. Sodhi quickly became close to Bhindranwale, eventually becoming his chief bodyguard and transport minister for his ability to drive anything from a scooter to an aeroplane. Sodhi was dubbed by Bhindranwale as his right-hand man and right arm. He was valued by Bhindranwale for his expertise in weapons and was the only Sikh with Bhindranwale who could use an RPG. He was praised by Bhindranwale for his ability to ride a motorcycle with excellence. It is said that around this time Sodhi spent 3 months in simran not eating or sleeping.

== Militancy ==
Sodhi was said to have never turned down a mission given by Bhindranwale.

=== Early militancy ===
In 1981, Sodhi, under orders from Bhindranwale, bought 18 pistols and a plethora of ammunition near the Nepal border with another Sikh. Sodhi was pulled over and arrested in Sonipat, Haryana. He was charged for smuggling weapons. Sodhi was soon bailed out by the family of the fellow militant arrested for 50,000 rupees. (Equivalent to 1 million rupees in 2023, or US$12,500 in 2023)

On 28 September 1981, damage was done to the railway track between Nasrala and Sham Churasi railway station in Hoshiarpur. Sodhi was arrested for this. He was tortured while in jail by the SSP (Senior Superintendent of Police) of Hoshiarpur District, Avtar Singh Atwal. A year after his arrest and his transferd to Jalandhar Jail, and Sodhi was bailed out by a local resident. Sodhi did not show up to his scheduled hearing and became wanted by police.

On 4 August 1982, Jarnail Singh Bhindranwale, with Harchand Singh Longowal, launched Dharam Yudh Morcha. Sodhi was released after the Morcha began and joined the Morcha out of genuine conviction.

=== Killing Nirankari Star Resham Singh ===
On 27 October 1982, Surinder Singh Sodhi, and Labh Singh killed Resham Singh. Resham was the Sant Nirankari head of Hoshiarpur District and 1 of the 7 Sant Nirankari stars which were the Sant Nirankari version of the Panj Pyare. Following the 1978 Sikh–Nirankari clash, which saw 13 Sikhs killed and 150 injured, Nirankari were expelled by the Akal Takht out of the Sikh fold and became a target of attacks.

Sodhi and Labh Singh had disguised themselves as police. They had approached Resham posing as officers who just wanted to chat. As Resham was talking about Bhindranwale, supposedly negatively, Labh Singh and Sodhi pulled out stenguns and opened fire, killing him instantly. It is said that Sodhi and Labh Singh fled on a Royal Enfield Bullet and fired victory shots.

=== Looting Home Guards armoury ===
On 4 April 1983, the Akali Dal launched Rasta Roko Morcha as part of Dharam Yudh Morcha. At Kup Kalan near Malerkotla, where Rasta Roko Morcha protesters were, security forces and paramilitary forces opened "indiscriminate and unprovoked" fire which resulted in the death of 24 or 26 protesters and the burning of shops and tractors. Around 1,000 protestors were jailed and around 500 protestors and police were also wounded. 10 days after Rasta Roko Morcha, a Home Guards armoury in Ferozepur was looted in revenge. It was looted by Surinder Singh Sodhi and his accomplices. Sodhi seized 28 .303 service rifles, 14 stenguns, and 360 rounds of ammunition.

=== Killing Inspector Bhagwan Singh Karianwala ===
On 30 May 1983, Surinder Singh Sodhi along with Major Singh Nagoke and Labh Singh killed Inspector Bhagwan Singh Karianwala. He was gunned down in Sultanpur Lodhi in a busy market while patrolling. Bhagwan was killed along with his gunmen, a police constable. Sodhi, Labh and Nagoke grabbed the guns of the killed policemen, those being a stengun and revolver. Bhagwan had been accused by Bhindranwale as being one of the leading officers in the torture of Sikhs.

=== Killing Nirankari leader Kultara Singh ===
On 21 July 1983, Surinder Singh Sodhi killed the Nirankari head of Hoshiarpur, Kultara Singh. Kultara was killed by Sodhi outside of a tailor shop. He was chased by police but managed to escape.

=== Escape from police ===
Sodhi was wanted by police. He was once spotted by police who surrounded the area preventing escape. Sodhi looked for a way to escape, but found only one way. It was a railway line. To escape Sodhi drove his motorcycle, a bullet, on a single beam of the rail track for 3 miles. He escaped the police. This story became a folktale.

=== Killing Inspector Gurcharan Singh Sansi ===
On 15 August 1983, at around 1:15 PM Surinder Singh Sodhi, Major Singh Nagoke, and Labh Singh, from a motorcycle, opened fire on and killed Inspector Gurcharan Singh Sansi who was also on a motorcycle. Sansi was killed in Muktsar. Sodhi had been hunting for Sansi for much time. On 15 August he saw Sansi. Sodhi, Labh and Nagoke had driven beside Sansi. Sodhi drove the motorcycle while Nagoke, and Labh shot Sansi. His gunmen, a police constable, was shot and injured but survived. Both of their weapons were taken by Sodhi. Sodhi, Nagoke, and Labh drove away shouting "Bole so Nihal; Sat Sri Akal". Sansi had been accused of killing and "drinking the blood" of Sikhs by Bhindranwale. He was accused of being the leading officer in the torture of Sikhs.

A lyric from a famous dhadi ballad about this translates to, "3 Singhs of the Guru came like a horse; At the opportunity they came to Mukhtsar and brought freedom; A new flag has been flown by the motorcyclewale. (Literally those who ride motorcycles; referring to Kharkus) Sansi was put on the car of death by motorcyclewale; Sansi was put on the train of death by the motorcyclewale."

=== Bank Robbery ===
On 21 September 1983, Surinder Singh Sodhi and others looted 27,000 rupees (Equivalent to 450,000 rupees in 2023, or US$5,500 in 2023) from Punjab and Sind bank in Amritsar.

=== Killing Sergeant Makhan Singh ===
On 26 September 1983, Makhan Singh, a Sergeant (according to some sources a Head Constable or an S.H.O.) of Senior Superintendent of Police (SSP) Surjit Singh, was killed in Putlighar area of Amritsar outside of a hotel by Surinder Singh Sodhi and Labh Singh. Makhan had made his way to a hotel where Labh Singh and Sodhi were in disguise. Labh Singh and Sodhi had been hunting Makhan for some time. Sodhi, upon recognising Makhan shouted, "Makhan, run if you can, we have come to finish you off." Makhan was shot in the shoulder by Labh Singh. He ran out of the hotel and attempted to flee, but failed to do so and was killed outside with a spray of bullets in his head and chest. Sodhi and Labh Singh made a quick getaway. Police conducted multiple searches to find them, but they proved futile. Makhan had been on the hit list of militants for much time. Makhan had been named by Sant Jarnail Singh as someone who was an enemy of Sikhs. He was also accused of being part of the torture and extrajudicial execution of Kulwant Singh Nagoke. Jarnail Singh accused him of 13 extrajudicial killings.

A famous lyric from a Kavishari song about this incident translates to, "Makhan was doing great sins regularly; his death came beautifully."

=== Attack on DSP Gurbachan Singh ===
On 29 October 1983, Surinder Singh Sodhi with Makhan Singh Babbar and Labh Singh attacked retired DSP (Deputy Superintenat of Police) Gurbachan Singh also known as Bachan Singh. Gurbachan was at a shop owned by his son. Sodhi and the others first disguised themselves as police officers. They then made their way to Gurbachan. Sodhi, Makhan, and Labh attacked Gurbachan and his security with stenguns. The attack turned into a 30 minute shootout with a constable and salesmen being killed. A head constable, Karnail Singh, would later die of his wounds. Gurbachan lived by taking cover and playing dead. Surinder Singh Sodhi was injured in the attack. Makhan Singh was also injured in the attack and received blood from Manbir Singh Chaheru to live. Gurbachan Singh had tortured Amrik Singh He also had tortured Kulwant Singh Nagoke and after killed him in an extrajudicial execution. He was also involved in other extrajudicial executions. He had been named by Jarnail Singh as an enemy of the Panth and someone who, "..drank Sikh blood".

=== Jewellery store robbery ===
On 26 November 1983, Surinder Singh Sodhi robbed 1,500,000 rupees (Equivalent to 25,000,000 rupees in 2023, or US$305,000 in 2023) from a jewellery shop in Karol Bagh, Delhi.

=== Killing BJP MLA Harbans Lal Khanna ===
On 2 April 1984, Surinder Singh Sodhi along with Labh Singh killed former MLA Harbans Lal Khanna in his medical shop in Amritsar. Khanna was the BJP district president at the time. His bodyguard and 1 customer of his shop were also killed. Sodhi and Labh Singh also burned down a police jeep by Khanna's shop. Sodhi and Labh Singh had posed as police officers. Sodhi waited outside on a motorcycle as Labh Singh entered the shop. Labh Singh opened fire with a stengun killing Khann's bodyguard and others, all of whom were sitting. Khanna shouted frantically. Labh Singh said, "Dhoti, topi (hat), at Yamuna. Long live Khalistan." He then killed Khanna.

Khanna had raised slogans translating to, "We are not going to let any second or third group exist, we are not going to let a turban remain on any head; the kacchera, the kara, the kirpan, send these to Pakistan". In February 1984 he led a mob that destroyed a replica of the Golden Temple at Amritsar railway station and put feces and lit cigarettes on a painting of Guru Ram Das which had been on display for many years. All of this had made him a prime target for Sikhs.

The killing of Khanna led to a 48-hour curfew in Amritsar and paramilitary and army deployment to the city. Soon rioting also broke out. The riots left at least 7 dead.

A famous lyric from a Kavishari song about this incident translates to, "Jago (Referring to Sikh revolution) made Harbans Lal Khanna spill red. Don’t go against the words of Singhs. Those who did have been "taught"(killed). Kara, kachera, will remain here; Your (Harbnas Lal Khanna) evening has been brought. Jago has arrived; From where did it come; From Bhindranwale Sant; The motorcyclewale have moved to forward".

=== Chief Minister of Haryana Bhajan Lal ===
Surinder Singh Sodhi was given the duty of killing Bhajan Lal the Chief Minister of Haryana by Jarnail Singh Bhindranwale. Bhajan Lal had started the construction of SYL which was opposed by Sikh. Bhajan Lal as head of the Haryana government in November 1982 had Sikh indiscriminately stopped, searched, and humiliated who planned to hold a protest at the Delhi Asia Games. Bhindranwale blamed Bhajan Lal for rioting against Sikh in Haryana during early 1984. The rioting saw the burning of 24 saroops of Guru Granth Sahib, 6 Gurdwaras, shaving 125 Sikh, and stripping 3 Sikh girls. All of this made Bhajan Lal a key target. Once Sodhi was in range of shooting Bhajan Lal, but had been ordered to chop off Bhajan Lal's head by Bhindranwale. Because of his devotion to honour Bhindranwale's words Sodhi left Bhajan Lal. Bhindranwale later claimed that if Sodhi had lived 15 days more, he would have killed Bhajan Lal .

== Death and aftermath ==
On 14 April 1984, Surinder Singh Sodhi was shot and killed while drinking milk in a shop in Amritsar by Surinder Singh Shinda and Baljit Kaur. Baljit Kaur had attempted to assassinate Jarnail Singh Bhindranwale on 13 April, but backed out. Baljit Kaur, went to the Golden Temple after the killing and confessed to the murder. Baljit Kaur was interrogated by Bhindranwale. She admitted to the other killer being her boyfriend Surinder Singh Shinda and to being paid 200,000 rupees (3.1 million rupees in 2023, or US$37,500 in 2023) by Gurcharan Singh, the general secretary of Akali Dal led by Harchand Singh Longowal, to do the killing. She also implicated others. In a speech, Bhindranwale said, "They (Akali Dal) killed our young men. They severed my right arm... I know what role that lion, that son of his mother played in seeking vengeance for the martyrs". Bhindranwale stressed that if Sodhi lived 15 days more Bhajan Lal would be dead.

Bhindranwale vowed revenge and to punish those responsible in 48 hours. With this Labh Singh and others made their way to punish the culprits. The first revenge attack was on Jasit Singh the owner of the tea shop where Sodhi was killed. He and a co-conspirator were shot dead the day after. Bachan Singh (alias Toti) was found dead with him being torched. He was a co-conspirator. Labh Singh and others killed Surinder Singh Shinda. They had stopped Shinda at a fake police checkpoint made by Labh Singh and others. He was chopped into 7 pieces for shooting Sodhi 7 times. Baljit Kaur was killed, reportedly shot dead. Malik Bhaita, the Akali Dal head of Amritsar, confessed to his role in arranging the taxi for Shinda's escape. He was momentarily forgiven by Bhindranwale, but while leaving the Golden Temple Complex Bhaita was slashed with swords by Bhindranwale's followers. Bhaita attempted to flee to Longowal, but was killed with a bullet. He put a signboard up in view of Longowal's office saying, "Sodhi's murder avenged within 48 hours. The other conspirators should look after themselves now." Longowal feared that he would be killed next and managed to have Babbar Khalsa side with him and provide security. 130 Akali leaders and 40 SGPC members revolted against Longowal and sided with Bhindranwale. With this Akali Dal under Longowal and Indira Gandhi agreed they had to 'neutralise' Bhindranwale.

On 25 April 1984, Longowal wrote a letter to Indira Gandhi informing her that Gurcharan Singh's life is in danger since his role in plot to kill Sodhi is out. He calls on Gandhi to protect Gurcharan. Longowal also says in the letter, "Most of Bhindranwale men will run away when they see the army and most probably he will too".

During Operation Blue Star Gurcharan Singh was killed by Bhindranwale and his followers.
