= Amrik Singh =

Indian Sikh religious and political leader (1948–1984)

President of AISSF
- Preceded by: Hari Singh
- Succeeded by: Manjit Singh

Personal details
- Born: 24 February 1948
- Died: 6 June 1984 (aged 35–36) Harmandir Sahib, Amritsar, India
- Spouse: Bibi Harmeet Kaur
- Children: 3

Amrik Singh (24 February 1948 – 6 June 1984) was the President of the All India Sikh Students Federation. He was killed in the Indian Army's operation on the Golden Temple on June 6, 1984.

Amrik Singh was the son of Giani Kartar Singh Bhindranwale, the 13th leader of the Damdami Taksal. He was well versed in Gurbani and Sikh literature, and devoted much of his life to Sikh progressive activities. He had passed his Masters in Punjabi from Khalsa College in Amritsar after which he began research work on his Ph.D. thesis.

Amrik Singh was a prominent leader of the Damdami Taksal along with Jarnail Singh Bhindranwale. He contested the 1979 Shiromani Gurdwara Parbandhak Committee (SGPC) election, backed by Bhindranwale, but lost to Jiwan Singh Umranangal.

On 26 April 1982, he led a campaign to get Amritsar the status of a "holy city". During the agitation, he was arrested on 19 July 1982 along with other members of the Damdami Taksal. Jarnail Singh Bhindranwale began the Dharam Yudh Morcha to implement the Anandpur Resolution which primarily requested more autonomy for Punjab, arguing that it was being oppressed and treated unfairly by the Indian government. As part of the Morcha, he also demanded freedom for Amrik Singh and other prominent Sikhs.

== Early life ==
Amrik Singh was born in 1948 as the son of Giani Kartar Singh Bhindranwale, the 13th leader of the Damdami Taksal. Manjit Singh was his younger brother. Singh studied at Khalsa College and received his MA and was on his way to completing his PhD, but never submitted his thesis as he began pursuing promotion of Sikh teachings.

== All India Sikh Student Federation ==
Singh was made president of the AISSF on 2 July 1978 at a meeting held at Tagore Theatre, Chandigarh.

=== Building Gurdwara Shaheed Ganj in honor of the Sikhs massacred in 1978 ===
Singh contributed significantly to opposing the Sant Nirankaris and to the building of the Gurdwara Shaheed Ganj, in B-Block Amritsar, at the spot where the 13 Sikh protesters were murdered by the Nirankaris. When no other organization came forth and the government refused to sell the land to Singh and the AISSF, they began building the Gurdwara wall at night so they could claim the land by force. Sikh youth would spend the entire night building the wall and it would be knocked down by the police the next day. A stand off between the police and the AISSF began and the police threatened they would shoot anyone on sight. They were met with opposition from Amrik Singh who said they would do anything to raise the memorial for the martyred Sikhs. Eventually the police acceded to the demands of the Sikhs and the Gurdwara remains there today.

=== Running for SGPC Elections ===
In the General House Shiromani Gurdwara Parbandhak Committee (SGPC) elections of 1979, the first in 13 years, Singh ran and lost to Jiwan Umramangal. Singh was a member of the Dal Khalsa and Bhindranwale's group, which fielded about 40 candidates in total, running against the Akali Dal. Singh ran for the SGPC Beas constituency. Notably, one of the Dal Khalsa's aims included establishing an independent Sikh State. Some elements of the Congress party supported and backed Dal Khalsa's and Bhindranwale's group so they could undermine the Akalis.

=== Strikes and agitations ===
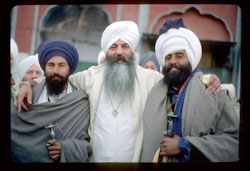
Amrik Singh (left) with Yogi Bhajan (centre) and Baba Nihal Singh (right), 1980

The AISSF held a strike on 25 October 1980 and another on 14 November 1980 to protest against the bus fare increase and other issues in such districts as Amritsar, Gurdaspur, Jalandhar, Patiala, Ludhiana with trains not being able to operate then. This resulted in student-police clashes at numerous places causing the police to open fire at Dasuya and Jhabhal. On 14 November 1980, due to the strike against the bus fare increase, there was jammed traffic in the province. The residents of the province provided full support for the Sikh students. Following these agitations, all political parties joined the struggle against the increased bus fares. There are some reports of police stations being attacked.

The AISSF held numerous agitations, strikes, and street riots against various causes and politicians. During the time of the bus fare agitations, the AISSF also held numerous demonstrations against various political leaders including the chief minister of Punjab, Darbara Singh. Some notable agitations including Sikh students besieging various Punjab ministers and locking themselves inside their offices or residences during early December 1980. The students responsible were arrested and tortured and more subsequent agitations was launched for the release of these students with these agitations were so forceful that the police released the students within a couple of days.

The success of the AISSF, which this time numbered to a membership of 300,000 members, at one point compelled the non-government political parties to join in and hold a demonstration in front of the state secretariat at Chandigarh from making a speech, in January 1981. Thousands of AISSF volunteers joined the demonstration with more than a thousand being arrested and eventually police throwing tear-gas and also caning them, however the AISSF were successful in delaying the Punjab governor from making a speech making the government invite all the political parties for a dialogue.

=== Anti-tobacco march ===
This issue of banning tobacco in and other improvements to Amritsar also put leeway to get the Sikh issues to mainstream politics. In May 1981 The AISSF alongside Dal Khalsa put forth to pass the bill of banning tobacco in the city of Amritsar, tobacco is forbidden in Sikhism, this bill was originally introduced in 1977 by the Akali Dal for the 400 years founding of Amritsar celebrations. The AISSF gave an ultimatum to the Punjab government to ban tobacco in the city by 30 March or there would be an agitation. The Government of Punjab seemed to agree with the issue but they said that technically passing such a ban would be unconstitutional and therefore could not. Meanwhile, AISSF members forcibly started preventing merchants from selling tobacco and to add to the heat Harchand Longowal also publicly expressed his support for the ban.

==== Opposition's pro-tobacco march ====
On 29 May 1981 thousands of Hindus marched in Amritsar to protest against the AISSF ban for tobacco demand. They carried sticks with lit cigarettes through the Amritsar bazaar, attacking Sikhs along the way and yelling provocative slogans.

==== Bhindranwale's march ====
In response to the pro tobacco march, on 31 May 1981, the AISSF, Damdami Taksal, Dal Khalsa joined together led by Sant Jarnail Singh Bhindranwale and with over 20,000 supporters put out a procession. No major Akali leader participated in the march. The march went a route of about two and a half kilometres. Following the march there were eruptions of Hindu-Sikh clashes in Amritsar with the government then initiating new laws banning non-religious processions from taking place. These events died down once the government agreed to form a committee to discuss 'holy-city' status for Amritsar.

==== Outcome ====
Holy-city status was not given to Amritsar however on 27 February 1983 the Prime Minister passed a law making meat, alcohol and tobacco sale prohibited in the areas around the Harmandir Sahib and the Hindu Durgiana temple in Amritsar. On 10 September 2016 Aam Aadmi Party leader Arvind Kejriwal promised 'holy-city' status to Amritsar as well as Anandpur Sahib on his visit to the city. He declared liquor, tobacco, cigarette and meat would be banned in these cities.

== Arrest and release ==
On 19 July 1982 Amrik Singh was arrested for vehemently pleading the case of the arrested workers causing offense and attention to Chenna Reddy, the Governor of Punjab, as well as a possible connection in the attack on Joginder Singh Sandhu, a senior Nirankari leader.

According to Sant Jarnail Singh, he had sent Amrik Singh to inquire after some Sikhs were captured by police and beaten. Their licensed gun and 16,000 rupees were confiscated. When Amrik Singh went to inquire he was arrested. Next Thara Singh was sent to inquire and he too was arrested.

Sant Jarnail Singh started a morcha (agitation) on 19 July 1982 for the immediate release of Bhai Amrik Singh and other Sikhs. It had popular support throughout Punjab, including support from Akali Dal, Darbara Singh, and the farmers of Majha's country side. Harcharan Longowal, leader of the Akali Dal than announced that his morcha would also be for the release of Amrik Singh and the 45 original demands presented to Indira Gandhi. Upon news of Akali Dal's new morcha for the release of Bhai Amrik Singh, Jarnail Singh agreed to discontinue his agitation and join the Akali Dal's planned Dharam Yudh Morcha which began on 4 August 1982.

=== Manawala encounter ===
Amrik Singh is said to have been involved in the planning of an attempted assassination of Senior Superintendent of Police (SSP) DR Bhatti on March 16, 1983. The assassination was foiled before it occurred and led to an encounter between Sikh militants and police in Manawala near Amritsar. 5 Sikh militants had left Amritsar to assassinate SSP DR Bhatti. A Nihang had informed Punjab police of their plans and police attacked the militants in Manawala. The militants managed to drive away and police did not pursue them as SSP Pandey had been wounded. In the encounter one Sikh militant was also killed. The remaining militants fell back to Amritsar.

SSP DR Bhatti had been targeted for his role in the Chando Kalan incident which saw police fire upon Sikhs, looted their luggage, and burned the Guru Granth Sahib. Bhindranwale and others Sikh religious leaders also relayed that police had behaved illegally with the Sikh inhabitants of the village during the search in which the valuables from homes belonging to Sikhs were reported to have been looted and two buses owned by the Damdami Taksal containing a number of Birs (copies) of the Guru Granth Sahib were set on fire.

=== Release ===
While in Gurdaspur prison Amrik Singh and Thara Singh built a mandir for the Hindu prisoners. Amrik Singh was released with fellow Sikh in the summer of 1983. Amrik Singh was subsequently honoured at the Akal Takht with flowered garland saropas (robes of honour).

== Militancy and death ==
Amrik Singh said that Deputy Superintendent of Police (DSP) Bachan Singh had tortured him in prison. Bachan Singh, his wife Amarjit Kaur and their bodyguard Milka Singh were shot dead by two gunmen, reportedly to avenge the torture. Their 18-year daughter was shot in the neck and back but survived the attack.

=== Railway burning ===
Amrik Singh and Harminder Singh Sandhu, AISSF General Secretary, were the masterminds behind the burning of 39 railways on April 14, 1984. The railways were burned in protest of AISSF being banned a month earlier.

=== Death ===
Amrik Singh was killed fighting in Operation Blue Star.
