= Rasta Roko Morcha =

1983 protest in India

- Part of Dharam Yudh Morcha
- Location: Kup Kalan, Malerkotla, Punjab, India
- Date: April 4, 1983
- Target: Akali Protestors
- Attack type: Shooting
- Injuries: 500 Protestors and Police injured
- Victims: 24 or 26
- Perpetrator: Indian Paramilitary Forces
- Motive: Attempt at stopping Akali Demonstration

The Rasta Roko Morcha (Meaning block the roads agitation) was an agitation launched in India by the Akali Dal in April 1983 under Harchand Singh Longowal as part of Dharam Yudh Morcha.

== Background ==
Dharam Yudh Morcha was an agitation launched by the Akali dal in collaboration with Sant Jarnail Singh Bhindranwale to implement the Anandpur Sahib Resolution. The Akali Dal had come under pressure for how slow Dharam Yudh Morcha was. Because of this Harchand Singh Longowal decided to launch the Rasta Roko Morcha which would take place on April 4 of 1983. The morcha would consist of Akali workers and volunteers blocking roads to stop all traffic in Punjab. The Akalis hoped the morcha would convince Indira Gandhi to implement the Anandpur Sahib Resolution.

== Events and Reactions ==
On the eve of Rasta Roko Morcha shoot-on-sight orders were issued in Punjab. On April 4 of 1983, the morcha went into effect. 10,000s of Akalis would sit on the roads and block traffic all over Punjab. They would also sing Bani (sacred hymns). Trains into Punjab were cancelled by the Indian government and all other transport was "paralyzed" throughout Punjab by the Akalis. At Kup Kalan near Malerkotla security forces and paramilitary forces opened "indiscriminate and unprovoked" fire which resulted in the death of 24 or 26 protesters and the burning of shops and tractors. Around 1,000 protestors were jailed and around 500 protestors and police were also wounded. A fact-finding committee was formed which was made up of opposition leaders. The committee said, "excesses committed by the police were heart rending". A police sub-inspector, Bichhu Ram, arrested 1 amritdhari Sikh. He cut the Sikh's beard and spat chewing tobacco into his face. Cutting hair and using tobacco are considered cardinal sins for amritdhari Sikh. Bichhu Ram would be killed in retaliation of this incident in December 1983.

The violence was unexpected and left many shocked. Bhag Singh who was present said, "I was beaten up and my shop damaged for no fault of mine, I sat here working when the police attacked. Where should I go? This is my home, my work-place."

Harchand Singh Longowal remarked on the incident, "I want to tell Mrs Gandhi, that our patience is getting exhausted. She should stop playing with fire. This is not Assam. We will die like soldiers at the hands of the police... we will tolerate no further ruse till she stops playing Holi with our blood." Sant Jarnail Singh commented, "If the Akali Morcha Dictator Harchand Singh Longowal permits me, I shall take only 24 hours to take revenge on the Punjab police, which has killed 30 innocent Punjabis on April 4, and teach Punjab Chief Minister Darbara Singh, who is behaving like that atrocious Mir Manu, for a petty seat of chief ministership, a correct lesson." Gurcharan Singh Tohra, the president of the SGPC, said, "The Central Government wants to test our strength. Let it. Sikhs must understand that Mrs Gandhi's Government is not bothered about the killings and wants an Assam-like situation in Punjab. Mrs Gandhi's only worry is her gaddi [seat] and she can play with fire for that. Human lives are immaterial to her. Her game is power and we understand it very well."

The Home Affairs Ministry said that it was a matter of deep regret that many lives were lost in Assam, Punjab, and other states. This further intensified Dharam Yudh Morcha and led to Rail Roko Morhca (Stop trains agitation) and Kaam Roko Morcha (Stop work agitation). 10 days after Rasta Roko Morcha a Home Guards armory in Ferozepur was looted. Sikhs seized 28 .303 service rifles, 14 stenguns, and 360 rounds of ammunition. It was looted by Surinder Singh Sodhi and his accomplices.
