= Anandpur Sahib Resolution =

1973 list of demands

The Anandpur Sahib Resolution was a statement with a list of demands made by a Punjabi Sikh political party, the Shiromani Akali Dal (SAD), in 1973. It was first presented by the Akali Dal on 16–17 October 1973 and advocated for political, religious, economic, and social reforms and demands. It would later be publicly revealed and endorsed at a 1978 Akali Dal conference in Ludhiana. The resolution stressed upon geographical concerns and state-autonomy. The document contained propositions that in some areas were semi-autonomous and others where it relied upon the central government (Sikhs in the army and central-government services).

== Etymology ==
The name of the resolution was linked to the city of Anandpur Sahib, which had been established by the tenth Sikh guru, Guru Gobind Singh. This name was disadvantageous to opponents of the resolution, as their opposition was viewed as being against Sikhism itself due to the name itself being linked to a city with such a close association with the Sikh religion.

== Overview ==
The resolution aimed to propagate the Sikh religion, maintain an independent religious identity, and was against irreligion. It positioned the Shiromani Akali Dal as the supreme body to represent the Sikh community based upon the Sikh concept of three pillars. It also proposed pro-education, anti-drug, anti-poverty and anti-caste aims. The religious goals were to be met through preaching, mass-baptisms, donations, improved gurdwara administration, betterment of Sikh academia, increased research into Sikh history, and improved access to Sikh sites in Pakistan. The resolution proposed an all-India and worldwide gurdwara network and administration, taking into account heterodoxical Sikh sects, such as the Udasis and Nirmalas, to integrate them better into the general Sikh collective.

Politically, the resolution stated to have been based on the ideals of the Khalsa Panth. It wanted equal state representation at the centre, special care in the case of Sikh members of the military, abolition for the need of a firearm licence for the general public if they have not been convicted of a crime, improved relations with neighbouring countries, and decentralization, with the central government only being responsible for defence, foreign affairs, post and telegraphs, currency, and railways, with all other responsibilities lying with the state government (not only for Punjab but decentralization for all Indian states was the aim). It viewed the foreign policies of India as being too aligned with that of the Soviet Union. The resolution endeavoured to recover areas it viewed as Punjabi-speaking and Sikh-populated that were not included in the Punjab state of India in 1966 in a goal to form a single Punjabi administrative unit utilizing all contiguous, Punjabi-speaking, and Sikh-populated areas. A list of such claimed areas is as follows:

- Dalhousie (claimed for district Gurdaspur)
- Chandigarh
- Kalka and Ambala City in district Ambala
- Una Tehsil (claimed for Hoshiarpur district)
- Desh illqa of Nalagarh
- Shahbad block of district Karnal
- Sub-tehsil of Gulha and Thona
- Rattia Block of district Hissar and Sirsa Tehsil
- Six tehsils of district Ganganagar of Rajasthan

There were also proposals in the public-sector, industry, and agriculture, such as minimum-wages, improved work conditions, tackle unemployment and provide unemployment-allowances, and providing of residences to workers. It proposed that "deserving" workers after retirement be given a pension after they turn 65-years-old. Furthermore, the tax system was requested to be reviewed, to prevent claimed undue penalty on the masses and tax benefits to the rich, such as by cracking down on black-money and tax-evasion. In the social sphere, it promised to provide schooling, work, and food to the downtrodden sections of the society so they could catch-up with the general population. It also advocated for a ban on cigarette smoking in public spaces.

== History ==
=== Background ===
The Shiromani Akali Dal was defeated by the Indian National Congress in the March 1972 Punjab election. The Akali Dal lost its political relevance during the term of Zail Singh, who had inducted projects that appealed to Sikh religious sensibilities, such as Guru Gobind Singh Marg. There was also little economic discontent in the state as agricultural product sale prices were high, material costs were low, such as for oil and fertilizers.

=== 1970s ===
First-page of the original, handwritten draft of the Anandpur Sahib Resolution (1973). Authored by Sardar Kapur Singh in his own hand.

After the tenure of Chief Minister Gurnam Singh in the Punjab, which was newly demarcated in 1966, the SAD captured only one seat at the elections to the Indian Parliament in 1971 from Punjab's 13 seats. In the Punjab Assembly, after the March 1972 Punjab election, their tally was reduced to 24 seats out of 117, and the Punjab government passed into the hands of the Congress Party, with Giani Zail Singh as chief minister.

Following its defeat, the SAD appointed a sub-committee on 11 December 1972 to reflect upon the situation and to reiterate and clarify the party platform. The sub-committee consisted of Surjit Singh Barnala, Gurcharan Singh Tohra, Jiwan Singh Umranangal, Gurmeet Singh, Dr. Bhagat Singh, Balwant Singh, Gian Singh Rarewala, Amar Singh Ambalavi, Prem Singh Lalpura, Jaswinder Singh Brar, Bhag Singh, and Major General Gurbakhsh Singh of Badhani. The first meeting of the sub-committee took place at Amritsar. The venue then shifted to Chandigarh where the committee completed its task in ten successive meetings. Counsel was available to the sub-committee of Sardar Kapur Singh, whose impress was carried by the draft emerging from its deliberations. The document was adopted unanimously by the working committee of the Shiromani Akali Dal at a meeting held at Anandpur Sahib on 16–17 October 1973 and came to be known as the Anandpur Sahib Resolution. The resolutions were approved by the General House of Akali Dal in a session at Ludhiana on 28 August 1977, later to be passed in the form of twelve resolutions. It was endorsed in the form of a succession of resolutions at the 18th All India Akali Conference of the Shiromani Akali Dal at Ludhiana on 28–29 October 1978.

The resolution included both religious and political issues. It asked for recognising Sikhism as a religion separate from Hinduism. It also demanded that power be generally devoluted from the Central to state governments, and more autonomy to Punjab.

The passing of the resolution went unreported by media in October or November of 1973, with there being no mentions of it until much later. In November of 1973, the Akalis held a conference in Malerkotla but this political event was described as a "flop" by The Tribune. Thus, there is a discrepancy on what the actual, original Anandpur Sahib Resolution document entailed, with Kuldip Nayar claiming the original English draft was prepared by Kapur Singh, with a Punjabi explanation being provided to Sant Fateh Singh. However, Kapur Singh had died a year earlier in 1972. According to Robin Jeffrey, it is more probable that the resolution regarding Punjabi autonomy and Sikh nationhood may have been drafted by the Akali Dal in October of 1973 as a means to improve their declining political fortunes and as a bargaining tool but there were little specific details and it was not publicized. Later in 1974–75, when Prakash Singh Badal tried to form an alliance with the Jana Sangh, any notions of the earlier resolution touching upon Sikh religious identity had to be downplayed. In 1975, Indira Gandhi enacted the emergency and many prominent Akali leaders were arrested and the press was silenced. It was only until August 1977 when the Akalis came back into power in the state that the resolution was brought-up again, chiefly later at a large-scale gathering in Ludhiana at the 18th All India Akali Conference held between 28–29 October 1978, where the twelve resolutions associated with the Anandpur Sahib Resolution was endorsed and adopted by the working committee of the S.A.D., but The Tribune reported the twelve resolutions as separate from one another and not part of any larger grouping that had been conceived earlier in 1973. At the 1978 Ludhiana conference, Bhindranwale supporters tried to disrupt the session due to them believing the Akali government was being soft toward the Sant Nirankari Mission after the recent clash between its members and orthodox Sikhs but they were silenced by the Akalis. The Akalis, itself dealing with factionalism in its own ranks, were downplaying any notions of separatist aims and allied with the Janata party, instead advocating for greater state independence. Around the same time, an organization called the Khalsa Mukti Fauj attacked the Janata-Akali Dal alliance, praised the Nehru-Gandhi family, and called for the formation of a "Sikh State", which may be linked to the Congress party trying to create political disturbance, with there being a possibility of an alliance between Congress (I) and an Akali faction.

=== 1980s ===
In the early 1980s, the Congress party returned to power in Punjab. By the 1980s, there were three different versions of the "Anandpur Sahib Resolution" in circulation, with politicians picking whichever one to promote based upon their own interests they wanted to advance. In April 1981, the minority Akali Dal led by Jagdev Singh Talwandi propagated a more extreme version. In 1982, a certain version was authenticated by the president of the Akali Dal, Harchand Singh Longowal.

The resolution declared its goal to give the state a quasi-independent status and to leave only foreign relations, defence, currency and general communications to be subject to the jurisdiction of the Indian government. Indira Gandhi, the leader of a rival to the SAD, the Indian National Congress (INC), viewed the Anandpur Sahib Resolution as a secessionist document.

The document reached prominence in the 1980s when the SAD and Jarnail Singh Bhindranwale joined hands to launch the Dharam Yudh Morcha in 1982 to implement the Resolution. Thousands of people joined the movement, feeling that it represented a real solution to demands such as a larger share of water for irrigation and the return of Chandigarh to Punjab.

The SAD officially stated that the Resolution did not envisage an autonomous Sikh State of Khalistan. Its president, Harchand Singh Longowal, declared:

Let us make it clear once and for all that the Sikhs have no designs to get away from India in any manner. What they simply want is that they should be allowed to live within India as Sikhs, free from all direct and indirect interference and tampering with their religious way of life. Undoubtedly, the Sikhs have the same nationality as other Indians.

— Harchand Singh Longowal, President of Akali Dal

After Operation Blue Star, Rajiv Gandhi reached a compromise with Longowal, the Rajiv-Longowal Accord, on 24 July 1985. The government accepted the demands of the SAD, which, in turn, agreed to withdraw its agitation. The accord attracted opposition from several orthodox Sikh leaders of Punjab as well as from the politicians of Haryana. Some of the promises could not be fulfilled because of the disagreements. Longowal was assassinated by Sikh militants who opposed the accord.

== Purpose ==
The Shiromani Akali Dal shall ever strive to achieve the following aims:

1. Propagation of Sikhism, its ethical values and code of conduct to combat atheism.

2. Preservation and keeping alive the concept of distinct and sovereign identity of the Panth and building up of appropriate condition in which the national sentiments and aspirations of the Sikh Panth will find full expression, satisfaction and facilities for growth.

3. Eradication of poverty and starvation through increased production and more equitable distribution of wealth and also the establishment of a just social order sans exploitation of any kind.

4. Vacation of discrimination on the basis of caste, creed or any other ground in keeping with basic principles of Sikhism.

5. Removal of disease and ill health, checking the use of intoxicants and provision of full facilities for the growth of physical well-being so as to prepare and enthuse the Sikh Nation for the national defence. For the achievement of the aforesaid purposes, the Shiromani Akali Dal owed society as its primary duty to inculcate among the Sikh; religious fervour and a sense of pride in their great socio-spiritual heritage through the following measures:

(a). Reiteration of the concept of unity of God, meditation on His Name, recitation of gurbani, inculcation of faith in the Holy Sikh Gurus as well as in Guru Granth Sahib Ji and other appropriate measures for such a purpose.

(b). Grooming at the Sikh Missionary College the Sikh youth with inherent potential to become accomplished preachers, ragis, dhadis and poets so that the propagation of Sikhism, its tenets and traditions and its basic religious values could be taken up more effectively and vigorously.

(c). Baptising the Sikhs on a mass scale with particular emphasis on schools and colleges wherein the teachers as well as the taught shall be enthused through regular study circles.

(d). Revival of the religious institution of Dasvandh among the Sikhs.

(e). Generating a feeling of respect for Sikh intellectuals including writers and preachers, who also would be enthused to improve upon their accomplishments.

(f). Streamlining the administration of the gurdwaras by giving better training to their workers. Appropriate steps would also be taken to maintain gurdwara building in proper condition. The representatives of the party in the Shiromani Gurdwara Prabandhak Committee would be directed to focus their resources towards these ends.

(g). Making suitable arrangements for error free publications of gurbani, promoting research in the ancient and modern Sikh history, translating holy gurbani into other languages and producing first-rate literature on Sikhism.

(h). Taking appropriate measures for the enactment of an All India Gurdwaras Act with a view to improving the administration of the gurdwaras throughout the country and to reintegrate the traditional preaching sects of Sikhism like Udasis and Nirmalas, without in any way encroaching upon the properties of their maths.

(i). Taking necessary steps to bring the Sikh gurdwaras all over the world under a single system of administration with a view to running them according to the basic Sikh forms and to pool their resources for the propagation of Sikhism on a wider and more impressive scale.

(j). Striving to free access to all those holy Sikh shrines, including Nanakana Sahib, from which the Sikh Panth has been separated, for their pilgrimage and proper upkeep.

(k). Development of the farmers (kisan) of Punjab.

== Resolution ==
Resolutions adopted, in the light of the Anandpur Sahib Resolution, at open session of the 18th All India Akali Conference held at Ludhiana on 28–29 October 1978, under the presidency of Jathedar Jagdev Singh Talwandi are as under:

=== Resolution No. 1 ===
Moved by Sardar Gurcharan Singh Tohra, president, Shiromani Gurdwara Parbandhak Committee.

The Shiromani Akali Dal realizes that India is a union and republican geographical entity of different languages, religions and cultures. To safeguard the fundamental rights of the religious and linguistic minorities, to fulfill the demands of the democratic traditions and to pave the way for economic progress, it has become imperative that the Indian constitutional infrastructure should be given a real federal shape by redefining the Central and State relation and rights on the lines of the aforesaid principles and objectives. The concept of total revolution given by Lok Naik Jaya Parkash Narain is also based upon the progressive decentralization of powers. The climax of the process of centralization of powers of the states through repeated amendments of the Constitution during the Congress regime came before the countrymen in the form of the Emergency (1975), when all fundamental rights of all citizens was usurped. It was then that the programme of decentralization of powers ever advocated by Shiromani Akali Dal was openly accepted and adopted by other political parties including Janata Party, C.P.I. (M), D.M.K., etc. Shiromani Akali Dal has ever stood firm on this principle and that is why after a very careful consideration it unanimously adopted a resolution to this effect first at the All India Akali Conference, Batala, then at Anandpur Sahib which has endorsed the principle of State autonomy in keeping with the concept of federalism.

As such, the Shiromani Akali Dal emphatically urges upon the Janata Government to take cognizance of the different linguistic and cultural sections, religious minorities as also the voice of millions of people and recast the constitutional structure of the country on real and meaningful federal principles to obviate the possibility of any danger to the unity and integrity of the country and, further, to enable the states to play a useful role for the progress and prosperity of the Indian people in their respective areas by a meaningful exercise of their powers.

=== Resolution No. 2 ===
This momentous meeting of the Shiromani Akali Dal calls upon the Government of India to examine carefully the long tale of the excesses, wrongs, illegal actions committed [against the Sikhs] by the previous Congress Government, more particularly during the Emergency, and try to find an early solution to the following problems:

(a) Chandigarh originally raised as a Capital for Punjab should be handed over to Punjab.

(b) The long-standing demand of the Shiromani Akali Dal for the merger in Punjab of the Punjabi-speaking areas, to be identified by linguistic experts with village as a unit, should be conceded.

(c) The control of headworks should continue to be vested in Punjab and, if need be, the Reorganization Act should be amended.

(d) The arbitrary and unjust Award given by Mrs. Indira Gandhi during the Emergency on the distributions of Ravi-Beas waters should be revised on the universally accepted norms and principles, and justice be done to Punjab.

(e) Keeping in view the special aptitude and martial qualities of the Sikhs, the present ratio of their strength in the Army should be maintained.

(f) The excesses being committed on the settlers in the Tarai region of the Uttar Pradesh in the name of Land Reforms should be vacated by making suitable amendments in the ceiling law on the Central guidelines.

=== Resolution No. 3 (Economic Policy Resolution) ===
The chief sources of inspiration of the economic policies and programme of the Shiromani Akali Dal are the secular, democratic and socialistic concepts of Guru Nanak and Guru Gobind Singh. Our economic programme is based on three principles:

  (a) Dignity of labor.
  (b) An economic and social structure which provides for the uplift of the poor and depressed sections of society.
  (c) Unabated opposition to concentration of economic and political power in the hands of the capitalists.

While drafting its economic policies and programme, the Shiromani Akali Dal in its historic Anandpur Sahib Resolution has laid particular stress on the need to break the monopolistic hold of the capitalists foisted on the Indian economy by 30 years of Congress rule in India. This capitalist hold enabled the Central government to assume all powers in its hands after the manner of Mughal imperialism. This was bound to thwart the economic progress of the states and injure the social and economic interests of the people. The Shiromani Akali Dal once again reiterates the Sikh way of life by resolving to fulfil the holy words of Guru Nanak Dev: "He alone realizes the true path who labors honestly and shares with others the fruits of that labor."

This way of life is based upon three basic principles:

i. Doing honest labor,
ii. Sharing with others the fruits of this labor, and
iii. Meditation on the Lord's Name.

The Shiromani Akali Dal calls upon the Central and the State governments to eradicate unemployment during the next ten years. While pursuing this aim, special emphasis should be laid on amelioration the lot of the weaker sections, scheduled and depressed classes, workers, landless and poor farmers and urban poor farmers and urban poor. Minimum wages must be fixed for all of them.

The Shiromani Akali Dal urges Punjab government to draw up such an economic plan for the state as would turn it into the leading state during the next ten years by raising per capita income to Rs. 3,000 and by generating an economic growth rate of 7% per annum as against 4% at the national level. The Shiromani Akali Dal gives first priority to the redrafting of the taxation structure in such a way that the burden of taxation is shifted from the poor to the richer classes and an equitable distribution of national income ensured. The main plank of the economic programme of the Shiromani Akali Dal is to enable the economically weaker sections of the society to share the fruits of national income.

The Shiromani Akali Dal calls upon the Central government to make an international airport at Amritsar which should also enjoy the facilities of a dry port. Similarly, a Stock Exchange should be opened at Ludhiana to accelerate the process of industrialization and economic growth in the State. The Shiromani Akali Dal also desires that suitable amendments should be made in the Foreign Exchange rules for free exchange of foreign currencies and thereby removing the difficulties being faced by the Indian emigrants. The Shiromani Akali Dal emphatically urges upon the Indian government to bring about parity between the prices of the agricultural produce and that of the industrial raw materials so that the discrimination against such states that lack these materials may be removed. The Shiromani Akali Dal demands that the exploitation of the produces of cash crops like cotton, sugarcane, oil seeds, etc., at the hand of traders should be stopped forthwith and for this purpose arrangements be made for purchase by government of these crops at remunerable prices. Besides, effective steps should be taken by government for the purchase of cotton through the Cotton Corporation. The Shiromani Akali Dal strongly feels that the most pressing national problem is the need to ameliorate the lot of millions of exploited persons belonging to the scheduled classes. For such a purpose the Shiromani Akali Dal calls upon the Central and State governments to earmark special funds. Besides, the state governments should allot sufficient funds in their respective budgets for giving free residential plots both in the urban and rural areas to the Scheduled Castes.

The Shiromani Akali Dal also calls for the rapid diversification of farming. The shortcomings in the Land Reforms Laws should be removed, rapid industrialization of the State ensured, credit facilities for the medium industries expanded and unemployment allowance given to those who are unemployed. For remunerative farming, perceptible reduction should be made in the prices of farm machinery like tractors, tubewells, as also of the inputs.

=== Resolution No. 4 ===
This gathering of the Shiromani Akali Dal regrets the discrimination to which the Punjabi language is being subjected in adjoining States of Himachal, Haryana, Jammu and Kashmir, Delhi, etc. It is its firm demand that in accordance with the Nehru Language Formula, the neighboring states of Punjab should give "second" language status to Punjabi because fairly large sections of their respective populations are Punjabi-speaking.

=== Resolution No. 5 ===
The meeting regrets that against the "claims" of the refugees who had migrated to Jammu and Kashmir as a result of the partition of the country, no compensation had been provided to them even after such a long time and these unfortunate refugees had been rotting in the camps ever since then. This Akali Dal session, therefore, forcefully demands that their claims should be settled soon and immediate steps should be taken to rehabilitate them even if it involves an amendment to section 370 of the Constitution.

=== Resolution No. 6 ===
The 18th session of the All India Akali Conference take strong exception to the discrimination to which the minorities in other states are being subjected and the way in which their interests are being ignored. As such, it demands that injustice against the Sikhs in other states should be vacated and proper representation should be given them in government service, local bodies and state legislatures, through nominations, if need be.

=== Resolution No. 7 ===
The 18th session of the All India Akali Conference notes with satisfaction that mechanization of farming in the country has led to increase in the farm yield and as a result the country is heading toward self-sufficiency in foodgrain. However, the session feels that poor farmers are unable to tale to mechanization because of the enormity of the cost involved. As such, the Shiromani Akali Dal urges upon the Government of India to abolish the excise duty on tractors, so that with the decrease in their prices, the smaller farmers may also be able to avail themselves of farm machinery and contribute to increase in agricultural produce of the country.

=== Resolution No. 8 ===
This conference of the Shiromani Akali Dal appeals to the Central and State governments to pay particular attention to the poor and laboring classes and demands that besides making suitable amendments in the Minimum Wages Act, suitable legal steps be taken to improve the economic lot of the laboring class, to enable it to lead respectable life and play a useful role in the rapid industrialization of the country.

=== Resolution No. 9 ===
This session seeks permission from the Government of India to install a broadcasting station at the Golden Temple, Amritsar, for the relay of Gurbani Kirtan for the spiritual satisfaction of those Sikh who are living in foreign lands. The session wishes to make it clear that the entire cost of the proposed broadcasting project would be borne by the Khalsa Panth and its overall control shall vest with the Indian Government. It is hoped that the Government would have no hesitation in conceding this demand after due consideration.

=== Resolution No. 10 ===
This mammoth gathering of the Shiromani Akali Dal strongly urges upon the Government of India to make necessary amendments in the following enactment for the benefit of the agricultural classes who have toiled hard for the sake of larger national interests: 1. Hindu Succession Act be suitably amended to enable a woman to get rights of inheritance in the properties of her father-in-law instead of the father's. 2. The agricultural lands of the farmers should be completely exempted from the Wealth Tax and the Estate Tax.

=== Resolution No. 11 ===
This vast gathering of the Shiromani Akali Dal strongly impresses upon the Government of India that keeping in vies that economic backwardness of the scheduled and non-scheduled castes, provisions proportionate to their population should be made in the budget for utilization for their welfare. A special ministry should be created at the centre as a practical measure to render justice to them on the basis of reservations. The session also calls upon the government that in keeping with the settlement already made, no discrimination should be made between the Sikh and Hindu Harijans in any part of the country.

=== Resolution No. 12 ===
The Congress government is called upon to vacate the gross injustice, discrimination done to Punjab in the distribution of Ravi-Beas waters. The Central government must also give approval for the immediate establishment of six sugar and four textile mills in Punjab so that the State may be able to implement its agro-industrial policy.

== See also ==
- Chief Ministers of Punjab (India)
- Kharku
