= Harbans Lal Khanna =

Indian politician

Harbans Lal Khanna (died in 1984) was a BJP MLA and president of its Amritsar district branch in Punjab, India.

== Biography ==
Khanna prominently led pro-smoking counter-demonstrations in the Sikh holy city of Amritsar, in response to the anti-smoking drives and demonstrations demanding holy-city status for Amritsar led by Jarnail Singh Bhindranwale prior to and during the Dharam Yudh Morcha, which was started jointly with the Shiromani Akali Dal. One of the slogans of Khanna's marches was "...bidi piyenge hum Shaan se jiyenge.”(We'll smoke cigarettes and live in pride)

While leading a procession against the Sikh effort to have holy city status granted to Amritsar, he had released slogans there on 30 May 1981, "Dukki tikki khehan nahin deni, sir te pagri rehan nahin deni; kachh, kara, kirpaan; ehnoon bhejo Pakistan." ("We are not going to let any second or third group exist, we are not going to let a turban remain on any head; the shorts, the iron bangle, the sword, send these to Pakistan").

On 14 February 1984, mobs led by Khanna gathered at as many as 56 places in Amritsar to engage in anti-Sikh desecrations. At the Amritsar Railway Station, a model of the Golden Temple was destroyed. A picture of Ram Das, the fourth Sikh guru, which had been on display for several years, was defaced beyond recognition, with feces and lit cigarettes rubbed into it. Carrying some of the pieces of the replica away, some Sikhs swore revenge.

He was shot by Sikh rebels in retaliation on April 2, 1984. The responsibility for the assassination was quickly claimed by a Sikh militant organization, the Dashmesh Regiment. After the assassination, there were clashes between Sikhs and Hindus, resulting in a Hindu temple being burned to the ground. Surinder Singh Sodhi, Jarnail Singh’s right-hand man, has been accused of being the killer and so has Labh Singh.

At his funeral, innocent protesting Sikhs were fired upon by the CRP by the admission of its top officials, though reports were never rectified to reflect this.
