= Rajiv–Longowal Accord =

1985 Indian political accord on Sikh issues

The Rajiv–Longowal Accord was an agreement signed by Indian Prime Minister Rajiv Gandhi and the Akali leader, Harchand Singh Longowal, on 24 July 1985. The government accepted the demands of Shiromani Akali Dal, which, in turn, agreed to end its agitation.

The accord attracted opposition from several orthodox Sikh leaders of Punjab, as well as from the politicians of Haryana. Some of its promises could not be fulfilled because of the disagreements. In August 1985, Longowal was assassinated by the Sikh militants opposed to the accord.

== Provisions ==
The following were the provisions of the accord:

S. No.	Provision	Status
1	Compensation to the families of the innocent persons killed in agitation or any action after 1 August 1982. Plus, compensation for property damaged.	Compensation was given to a number of victims and their families. As of 2005, the highest compensation paid to a victim's family was Rs. 3.5 lakhs, in 1996 in Delhi. There were a few cases in which the victims complained that they were denied compensation or were not paid the full amounts.
2	Army recruitment: Merit will remain the sole criteria for selection in the Indian Army. All the citizens have the right to enroll in the Army. (Earlier, on 14 March 1974, the defence minister Jagjivan Ram had announced that the recruitment from Punjab, Haryana and Himachal Pradesh would be reduced as they were heavily and disproportionately represented in the Army.)	The Defence Ministry clarified that Sikh Regiment and the Sikh Light Infantry regiments are entirely reserved for the Sikhs. The Sikhs have approximately 50% reservation in the Punjab Regiment, besides a sizable representation in other units.
3	Enquiry into the 1984 killings: Jurisdiction of Rangnath Mishra Commission enquiring into the 1984 Delhi riots will be extended to Bokaro and Kanpur.	In February 1987, the Mishra Commission absolved Congress (I) of responsibility for the riots, placing the guilt on Delhi police.
4	Rehabilitation: Those discharged from the Army for desertion will be rehabilitated and provided employment.	Arjun Singh, the Governor of Punjab stated that 280 discharged armymen will be rehabilitated. The Sikh leader Parkash Singh Badal claimed that 12,000 armymen had been discharged, and must be rehabilitated. By August 1985, 2,606 deserters had been identified, out of which 900 had been rehabilitated.
5	All-India Gurdwara Act for structured governance of the Sikh shrines in India	Not enacted. In December 1999, the Draft Bill on All India Sikh Gurdwara Act (AISGA) was introduced in the parliament. But it was severely criticized by the Sikh leaders especially on the clause which stated that the head priests of Akal Takht and four other superior Takhts will be appointed by a Central board.
6	Disposal of pending cases: Notifications applying AFSPA in Punjab will be withdrawn, and the special courts will try only the cases relating to following offences: (1) Waging War (2) Hijacking. All other cases will be transferred to the ordinary courts.	Limited releases were made
7	Territorial claims: Chandigarh will be given to Punjab, overruling the Shah Commission's suggestion that it should be given to Haryana. In lieu of Chandigarh, the Hindi-speaking villages of Punjab will be given to Haryana. A Commission will constituted to determine which areas will go to Haryana. The Commission will present its findings on 31 December 1985, and these findings will be binding on both the sides. The actual transfer of Chandigarh and other villages will take place on 26 January 1986. Another commission will be appointed to study the other boundary disputes between the two states.	A Commission headed by E.S. Venkataramiah was appointed on 3 April 1986 to determine which Hindi-speaking areas of Punjab will be given to Haryana. The Commission submitted its report on 7 June, and recommended the transfer of 70,000 acres of land from Punjab to Haryana. However, the actual transfer never took place due to disagreements. Three commissions (Matthew, Venkatarmiah and Desai) failed to provide an agreement. In July 1986, the Union government suspended the transfer for an indefinite period.
8	Centre-State relations: The part of the Anandpur Sahib Resolution dealing with the Centre-State relations will be referred to the Sarkaria commission.	Sarkaria Commission Report (October 1987) rejects the Anandpur Sahib Resolution approach to Center-State relations
9	Sharing of the river waters: Punjab, Haryana and other states will continue to get their existing share of water (or more) from the Ravi-Beas system. A tribunal headed by a Supreme Court judge will verify the river water claims of Punjab and Haryana; its findings will be binding on both the states. The construction of the Sutlej Yamuna link canal will continue, and will be completed by 15 August 1986.	On 30 January 1987, the Eradi Tribunal decide the shares as follows: Punjab - 5.00 million acre-feet (6.2 billion cubic metres), while 1985 usage was 3.106 million acre⋅ft (3.8 billion m^{3}); Haryana - 3.83 million acre⋅ft (4.7 billion m^{3}), while 1985 usage was 1.620 million acre⋅ft (2.0 billion m^{3}); It also stated that the above allocated shares may be increased or decreased in case of fluctuations in the river water availability.
10	Representation of minorities: The Prime Minister will re-instruct the Chief Ministers of the various states to protect the interests of the minorities.	Circular sent to all the Chief Ministers.
11	Promotion of Punjabi: The Central Government may take steps to promote the Punjabi language.	Punjabi language was granted the secondary official status in Delhi and Haryana. Punjabi Academy (Delhi) is engaged in promotion of the language.

== Opposition ==
=== Punjab ===
On 26 July, Longowal announced that the accord had been unanimously approved by a congregation of former MPs, MLAs, ministers and jathedars. However, Gurcharan Singh Tohra (SGPC President) and Prakash Singh Badal opposed every clause of the accord. Even after a meeting between Longowal, Tohra, Badal and Surjit Singh Barnala, the differences persisted. On 25 July, a group of Akali Dal leaders rejected the accord and called it a "sell-out". Joginder Singh, the father of Jarnail Singh Bhindranwale, presided over an Akali Dali meeting in which he described Longowal, Barnala and Balwant Singh as traitors to the Sikh panth. The resolution passed at the meeting stated that those leaders did not represent the Sikh masses and accused Longowal of diluting the Anandpur Sahib Resolution.

=== Haryana ===
The Haryana Chief Minister, Bhajan Lal, the HPCC (I) President Sultan Singh approved of the accord. However, the five opposition parties in Haryana - Lok Dal, BJP, Janata Party, Congress (S) and Congress (J) - declared that they would observe Haryana bandh on 31 July to protest the accord. After a rally in Rohtak, 29 members of the Haryana State Assembly resigned on 9 August. The protesters objected to the following:

- Consideration being given to the Anandpur Sahib Resolution, which the protestors believed to be the root cause of the trouble in Punjab
- Soft treatment being meted out to those who had deserted the Army
- "Absolutely vague" settlement regarding the territories that would be transferred to Haryana in lieu of Chandigarh
- Imposition of a ceiling on the use of the Ravi-Beas waters as per the current use: the protesters pointed out that Punjab was using more water than its allocated share, but Haryana was using less water than its share
- Uncertainty regarding who will control the headworks

== See also ==
- Indira–Sheikh Accord
