= Balwant Singh (Punjab politician) =

Indian politician (died 2019)

Secretary of Punjab Communist Party of India (Marxist)
- In office 1998–2008

MLA of Rajapura
- In office 1980–1985
- Preceded by: Harbans Lal
- Succeeded by: Prem Chand

Personal details
- Born: 1936/37
- Died: 21 March 2019
- Party: Communist Party of India (Marxist)

Balwant Singh was an Indian teacher belonging to Communist Party of India (Marxist). He was the secretary of Punjab Communist Party of India (Marxist). He was also a legislator of Punjab Legislative Assembly.

Singh was a government school teacher. He left his job and joined politics in 1968. He was elected as a member of Punjab Legislative Assembly from Rajapura in 1980. He also served as secretary of Punjab Communist Party of India (Marxist) from 1998 to 2008.

Singh died on 21 March 2019 at the age of 82.
