= Jiwan Singh Umranangal =

Indian politician

- Born: 1 October 1914; Dhaliwal Bet, Kapurthala State
- Died: 7 November 1998 (aged 84); Beas, Punjab, India
- Occupations: Revenue Minister of Punjab, Finance Minister of Punjab
- Political party: Shiromani Akali Dal
- Awards: Padma Bhushan

Jiwan Singh Umranangal (1914–1998) was an Indian politician belonging to the Akali Dal. He served as the revenue minister of Punjab.

Jiwan Singh was born in 1914, in the Dhaliwal Bet village of the Kapurthala district. He passed matriculation from the Kapurthala High School. Originally an agriculturalist by profession, he adopted politics as a career in 1952, becoming a member of the Akali Dal. He became a sarpanch and a nambardar (village head) of his native village Umra Nangal. He later served as the General Secretary of Akali Dal, and ultimately became the party's vice president.

Jiwan Singh was elected to the Punjab Legislative Assembly in 1968, 1977 and 1980. He served as the Revenue Minister under Gurnam Singh in 1968 and as Finance Minister under Parkash Singh Badal in 1977. He won the Shiromani Gurdwara Parbandhak Committee (SGPC) elections three times, and served on its executive committee for 12 years. In the 1979 SGPC election, he defeated the AISSF president Amrik Singh, who was backed by Jarnail Singh Bhindranwale. He became a close associate of the senior Akali leader Fateh Singh.

Jiwan Singh took a strong stand against the pro-Khalistan militants. In 1986, he embarked on a door-to-door campaign in the Majha region, meeting the families of the militants and asking for their help in persuading the militants to give up the violence. He also launched a 45-day padayatra, visiting those who had moved out of Punjab due to the violence, and convinced them to return. In retaliation, the militants killed his son Sukhdev Singh Umranangal on 8 May 1987.

He accused the SGPC of having failed to stop the intolerance and the hate campaigns in the community. He then left Akali Dal because of its leaders' ambiguous stand on the militant violence, and set up his own party "Jagat Akali Dal" on 21 January 1992. He later merged his party back into Akali Dal in February 1998.

Jiwan Singh was awarded Padma Bhushan (1991) and the National Amity Award (1996) by the Government of India. He also received the Maharana Partap Award in 1987. He died at the age of 84 at a hospital in Beas. He is the grandfather of Paramraj Singh Umranangal, a senior IPS Officer of the Punjab Cadre, who has been awarded the Medal for Gallantry services, twice for his fight against terrorism. He has also been awarded with the Police medal for his meritorious services to the nation.
