= Dharam Yudh Morcha =

Sikh regionalist protest movement in Punjab, India

- Date: 4 August 1982 - 10 June 1984
- Location: Punjab; Delhi
- Caused by: Increased federal centralization during the 1970s, Akali Dal reconnecting to its rural Sikh base, economic concerns
- Goals: Implementation of the Anandpur Sahib Resolution: decentralization and increased Punjabi state autonomy, riparian rights, prevention of the SYL Canal, retention of greater share of river waters, recognition of distinct Sikh legal identity, economic development
- Methods: Peaceful protests, political demonstrations, sit-ins, work strike
- Result: Failure of objectives leading to Insurgency in Punjab

Parties
Shiromani Akali Dal; Damdami Taksal; AISSF	Indian National Congress; Punjab Police; Indian Army

Lead figures
Surjit Singh Barnala; Jarnail Singh Bhindranwale †; Harchand Singh Longowal; Jagdev Singh Talwandi; Gurcharan Singh Tohra	Indira Gandhi; Zail Singh; Darbara Singh

Casualties
- Deaths: 220, including 190 Sikh protesters
- Arrested: Over 200,000 Sikhs

The Dharam Yuddh Morcha (Punjabi pronunciation: [t̪ə̀ɾᵊmə̆ jʊ́d̪ːə̆ moːɾᵊt͡ʃaː]) ("righteous campaign") was a political movement launched on 4 August 1982, by the Shiromani Akali Dal in partnership with Jarnail Singh Bhindranwale, with its stated aim being the fulfillment of a set of devolutionary objectives based on the Anandpur Sahib Resolution.

== Background ==
=== After the Punjabi Suba ===
The Akali Dal had opposed several effects of the Punjab Reorganisation Act on 1 November 1966, with Akali leaders protesting against it. Several months before its inauguration, movement leader Fateh Singh had expressed his dissatisfaction over several issues of contention. These included genuinely Punjabi-speaking areas being left out of the new state and given to Haryana and Himachal Pradesh which stemmed from the usage of falsified returns by the Arya Samaj in the 1961 census, and resulted in the state of Punjab consisting of far less of the over 35,000 square miles of the Punjabi-speaking state proposed by the Akalis, who had carefully drafted the demand strictly on the basis of language and using pre-1947 census figures. Other concerns included Chandigarh being turned into a Union Territory instead of becoming the capital solely of Punjab as promised, the level of autonomy of all of the states in the country, riparian concerns, agrarian reforms, and power and irrigation projects being taken over by the central government, instead of the state retaining control of them.

=== Emergency and the Save Democracy Morcha ===
In 1975, Indira Gandhi imposed Emergency rule. The Akali Dal, which took part in Raj Narain's Delhi protest, resolved in a meeting on 30 June to oppose "the fascist tendency of the Congress," also expressing discontent with the construction delay of the Thein Dam, discrimination in heavy industrial development, and unprofitable farm produce prices. Akali leader Harcharan Singh Longowal would state,

The question before us is not whether Indira Gandhi should continue to be prime minister or not. The point is whether democracy in this country is to survive or not. The democratic structure stands on three pillars, namely a strong opposition, independent judiciary, and a free press. The Emergency has destroyed all these essentials.

Punjab was at the center of anti-Emergency activism, with the Akalis launching the Save Democracy morcha on 7 July, with marches commencing on July 9 from the Darbar Sahib, which served as well-accepted hub of national dissent and protest organization. Punjab served as a haven for anti-Emergency protesters, with dissidents and political opponents from all over India taking refuge in the Darbar Sahib complex. Upon elections being called by her in January 1977 following negative world press, renewed hardline support, and the overturned conviction, Congress was defeated by an opposition alliance, and the Emergency was officially ended on March 23, 1977, with the Akali coalition assuming power in Punjab.

In the 21 months of the Emergency, over 140,000 people were detained, including journalists, scholars, activists, and opposition political party members, using laws like MISA and AFSPA. Seizure of private property, illegal home searches, mass sterilizations, and extrajudicial killings took place among targeted individuals, community leaders, and parties.

Of the arrests during the Emergency, approximately 40,000, or 30%, were of Sikh protesters, and the Sikh would earn Gandhi's ill-favor; many considered her resentment over the Emergency activism to be the root of the strife of the 1980s.According to policy analyst Tridivesh Singh Maini, "It has been argued that Mrs. Gandhi never forgave the Akalis for their opposition to the Emergency;" according to Puran Chand Joshi, "Indira got into her head that it [was] only the Sikhs who constituted a threat to her imperious and dynastic rule, and decided to inflict blows from which they would take long, if ever, to recover."

=== Centralization ===
The years following the Punjabi Suba movement were characterized by a centralizing tendency in the country. In 1978, several new policy areas were moved from the State List to the Concurrent List, including education, giving the center the power to set guidelines and make decisions regarding textbooks and curricula. The Akalis saw this move as yet another strategy of the central government to intrude on the Sikhs' hard-won autonomy and limit the expression of Sikh culture, history, and religion.

The struggle that emerged in the 1970s was primarily justified on economic reasons, some of which were a consequence of the 1966 reorganization. The Anandpur Sahib resolution, issued by the Akali Dal's working committee in 1973, called for the Indian constitution to be "recast on real federal principles, with equal representation at the center for all States," and a "congenial environment and political set-up" for the Sikhs. The resolution was not secessionist in nature but called for greater autonomy for Punjab, and protection of the Sikhs' cultural and religious rights, along with addressing economic concerns of the Punjab.

The Anandpur Sahib Resolution had been a comprehensive party program, not used in its full format in talks with the central government; the policy proposals developed a few years later based on the Anandpur Sahib Resolution was the 1978 Ludhiana Resolution, which put socio-economic concerns at the core. The Ludhiana Resolution called for an end to the center's control of Punjab's river waters and the just distribution of it, state control of the headworks, and better procurement prices and subsidies for the state's farmers. These issues were of particular concern to the state's rural Sikh population, as the Sikhs dominated the agricultural sector. Other demands included the maintenance of the ratio of Sikhs in the army, protections of Sikhs outside Punjab, Punjabi as a second language for states with significant Punjabi-speaking populations, amendments to tax and property policies for rural populations, a broadcasting station and a dry port at Amritsar, and a stock exchange at Ludhiana.

In September 1981, the Akalis formulated a list of 45 policies, 21 of which were economic in nature and concerned the state's entire population, eight were political in nature and concerned autonomy restrictions and ethnic concerns like Punjabi-speaking areas left out of the state, 14 were religious in nature, including calls for proper representation for Sikh minorities in other states and permission to install a broadcasting station at the Golden Temple, and two were social, concerning Sikhs specifically. The list would be trimmed down to 15 demands in October 1981, of which five were economic. The Dharam Yudh Morcha would champion these preliminary demands. The inclusion of religious demands were a result of polarization of Akali goals following failed negotiations in November with the Congress government, which would raise the specter of separatism to exploit the fears of Hindu voters and push the Akalis into a corner, as well as attempts to ally with, or outbid, more militant Sikh factions, which gained traction following the lack of progress and the growing religious revivalism that both the Akalis and Congress would attempt to play to gain influence. According to Atul Kohli,

The repeated failure of the Akalis to wrest power from Congress had left open a political space for those who argued that increased militancy was the only means for protecting Sikh interests. Bhindranwale stepped into that space.

== Partnership ==
The decision to launch the movement was taken at a World Sikh Conference in Amritsar on 15 July 1981, attended by more than 100,000 Sikhs.

As a result of his rising popularity, Jarnail Singh Bhindranwale faced opposition from all sides, including the government and rival Sikh factions, both political and militant. One of Bhindranwale's main concerns in his speeches was condemning factionalism and internal disunity among the Sikhs. This is reflected in one of his speeches,

Our misfortune is disunity.... We try to throw mud at each other. Why don't we give up thinking of mud and in close embrace with each other work with determination to attain our goals?

The Akali Dal leadership had initially opposed Bhindranwale. While Bhindranwale ceded leadership to the Akali Dal and disavowed political ambition, in 1980 the Akali Dal faced a serious challenge from Bhindranwale and his mass support from the AISSF, the Akali youth wing. Bhindranwale and the AISSF in turn derived most of their support from poor and middle-class rural Sikhs; unlike 1920, when the Akali party was founded to give voice to Sikh issues, and 1962, when Fateh Singh would assume leadership of the Akali Dal and shift its support base to rural Sikhs of Punjab's Malwa region during the Punjabi Suba movement, the leadership of the Sikh movement did not switch strata quickly and decisively, and the dichotomy between Bhindranwale/AISSF and the Akali Dal reflected different economic classes of agricultural Sikhs; they struggled for leadership of the community while simultaneously engaged in protest agitations against the central government. The economic and political crisis began to take religious overtones as the Akali Dal couched its economic and social demands in religious terms, and as negotiations with the central government on issues like Chandigarh and water rights continued to fail, Bhindranwale's position was strengthened. As described by Joyce Pettigrew, "it was not difficult for a people who defined themselves by reference to religious and historical tradition to identify themselves with Bhindranwale's message on questions relating to civil rights and the economic grievance of farmers, and for their subsequent action to be encapsulated within that religious tradition."

As Bhindranwale became increasingly influential, the party decided to join forces with him. In August 1982, under the leadership of Harcharan Singh Longowal, the Akali Dal launched the Dharam Yudh Morcha, or "righteous campaign", in collaboration with Bhindranwale to win more autonomy for Punjab. At the start of the protest movement, against long-standing wrongs not addressed by the state's economic and political process, the Akali leaders had, in their Ardas, or prayer, at the Akal Takht, resolved that they would continue the struggle until the Anandpur Sahib Resolution was accepted and implemented by the Government.

The Anandpur Sahib Resolution itself had been written during the concerted effort of the Akali Dal to reingratiate itself with the Sikh electorate following electoral losses in previous years and alienated Akalis who advocated for a return to a more Sikh orientation, and called for a devolution of power, which had remained greatly centralized following the Emergency. It outlined a more autonomous Punjab and Sikh community, with the most important points being less interference from the central government in areas which other states enjoyed independence, like the economy, and fair consideration of Sikhs in civil service, as Sikhs from Partition to the Reorganization in 1966 claimed to have been run out of the job market if they kept a visible Sikh appearance, including the turban and beard. During this period the Akali Dal had become part of the anti-Congress national mainstream against the Emergency, and the secularization of Akali priorities increased as Akalis interacted with other jailed political leaders.

The following 1977 elections were thus primarily focused on the Emergency and the restoration of democratic process, during which the Akalis would defeat the Congress, and again in 1979 with the Akalis winning 95% of contested seats. The elections were contested on a secular platform of constitutional devolution to reverse the effects of Gandhi's Emergency rule, failing to focus on the work that the SGPC was entrusted with, and depriving religious issues of a platform, leaving the party vulnerable on its "Sikh flank." The religious foundations of the Akali Dal were also played down during this period due to the party's need for coalition partners, as Congress drew enough Sikh votes to deny a majority. The Anandpur Sahib Resolution, which had been drafted to win back the declining support of the Sikh constituency, had fallen by the wayside. The Akalis, in their subsequent electoral defeat in 1980, would be forced by the presence of Bhindranwale and his huge base of support in the AISSF to return to its Sikh base. Another point of contention was Article 25, which fueled Sikh concerns over identity preservation, as they were not recognized as a separate community. This, along with economic factors and concerns over state resources, added to deepening alienation and kept the desire for a separate state alive among the community.

Later, noting Indira Gandhi's intransigence, it appeared that the Akali leaders were willing to water down their demands. Bhindranwale reminded his audiences that it had been Gurcharan Singh Tohra, Surjit Singh Barnala, Balwant Singh and other leaders who were signatories to the Anandpur Sahib Resolution and that he was not present when the Resolution was adopted. He insisted, however, that having said the Ardas at the Akal Takht, no Sikh could go back on his solemn word. Longowal's core political base began to wither; about a third of his SGPC members and district Akali presidents reportedly defected to Bhindranwale. Bhindranwale promised the Sikh masses that he would not allow the chief Akali leadership to fail them as before:

You people come and offer me money, love, and support. And if the Akali Dal try to compromise on the Anandpur Sahib Resolution I am not going to forgive them. I will be your watchdog but I tell you as watchdog that you will have to force the Akalis.... But do not think that as in the past, leaders can settle everything in Delhi or by taking a glass of juice on their own. [reference to Tara Singh abandoning his fast unto death in 1961 during the Punjabi Suba movement] This time they cannot give up by taking a glass of juice. Either the full implementation of the Anandpur Sahib Resolution or their heads.

Invoking the link between spiritual and political matters in Sikhism, in July 1983 he stated,

Whatever is written in the Anandpur Sahib Resolution...we shall definitely get that accepted [by the government]. If any of us becomes soft on this, I shall not spare him nor do I ask any leader to spare me [if I should retract]....Telling you is my duty, but getting [the government] to accept it will be yours. If I fail to tell you, do not forgive me and if you do not protect your rights, Guru will not forgive you.

== Purposes ==
Despite the Resolution's endorsement of "the principle of State autonomy in keeping with the concept of Federalism," Indira Gandhi and the central government took a hard line, emphasizing the Sikh demands and treating them as tantamount to secession, thus putting moderate Sikhs at a competitive disadvantage in an increasingly militant political arena. She would be later characterized by prime minister Charan Singh as following "a megalomaniacal policy based on elitist philosophies", and her successor Rajiv Gandhi would later describe the Resolution as "not secessionist but negotiable", recognizing the failures of her autocratic style of governance. Thousands of people joined the movement as they felt that it represented a real solution to their demands, such as a larger share of water for irrigation, and return of Chandigarh to Punjab. By early October, more than 25,000 Akali workers courted arrest in Punjab in support of the agitation. In February 1983, Bhindranwale gave a speech openly calling Sikhs in Punjab "slaves", outlining the unfair judicial system, Gandhi's denial of the Anandpur Sahib Resolution's demands, and economic measures taken by the government to suppress Punjabi prosperity, as well as past struggles in post-Independence India by Sikhs to ensure the most basic rights, including the protests against political and economic suppression since the 1960s:

How shall we get rid of this curse of slavery? If you wish to speak Punjabi, if you want a Punjabi-speaking state demarcated, if you wish a train named after Harmandir Sahib, if you want to get this city given the status of a holy city, not eighty but eighty-five thousand to eighty-six thousand of you go to jail, over one hundred and thirteen shed your blood and achieved martyrdom and still there is no announcement from Indira.

=== Riparian ===
The basic issues of the Dharam Yudh Morcha were related to the prevention of the digging of the SYL Canal, deemed unconstitutional, the redrawing of Punjab's boundaries following the Punjabi Suba movement to include left-out Punjabi-speaking areas, the restoration of Chandigarh to Punjab, the redefining of relations between the central government and the state, and greater autonomy for the state as envisioned in the Anandpur Sahib Resolution; the Akali Dal had demanded what was constitutionally due to Punjab. The main thrust of the Morcha was against the economic erosion of the state of Punjab, with the most important demand was the restoration of the state's river waters as per constitutional, national and international norms based on riparian principles; more than 75% of the state's river water were being drained from the state, to Rajasthan and Haryana, which were non-riparian states, and its accompanying hydropower potential, powered by Punjab's only natural wealth.

After the establishment of the Punjabi Suba in 1966, the Punjab Reorganization Act was amended to further drain the state of its waters. While according to the hastily estimated needs of each state in the 1955 Indus Water Treaty, 7.2 million acre-feet was allotted to Punjab, 8 m.a.f. to Rajasthan, and .65 m.a.f. to Jammu and Kashmir, the Punjab Reorganisation Act of 1966 stipulated that Punjab's rivers would be split between Punjab and Haryana, but not the Yamuna running through Haryana from which Punjab also drew water, on a mutual agreement; following the failure to reach one, the central government would be the arbiter. Indira Gandhi decided in 1976 during the Emergency that .2 of the 7.2 m.a.f. would go to Delhi, and the remaining 7 m.a.f. to be split evenly. The Chief Minister of Punjab Giani Zail Singh did not appreciate this injustice, though did not resign after being given a choice to. Upon returning to power, the Akalis approached Morarji Desai regarding the issue; he agreed on the non-riparian nature of Rajasthan in relation to Punjab's waters, but did not offer to revise the treaty without the condition that his verdict would be final. Indira Gandhi also declined to revisit her decision in talks with the Akalis on 26 November 1981. She also disagreed on Rajasthan, and split the remaining 1.32 of the 17.17 m.a.f. between Punjab and Rajasthan, while postponing other actions except for the completion of the SYL Canal within two years, in time for Haryana elections.

After the 1966 reorganization, the committee in charge of the formation of the states decided that both irrigation and power from the rivers Sutlej, Beas, and Ravi should be controlled by a board of representatives from each of the affected states, under central supervision. Because water, including water supplies, irrigation, canals, drainage, embankments, water storage, and water power, which greatly affected the state's agriculture and industry, were under the jurisdiction of states governments under Article 17 of the State List of the nation's constitution, the center's continued control over Punjab's river waters and power system was seen as a violation of the new state's constitutional rights. According to one Akali politician in 1982, the sharing of river water meant that Punjab's wealth was "gifted away to other states at the cost of [the people's] economy," a sentiment which resonated with the population, as according to surveys in the late 1980s, water deprivation for canal irrigation was among the top concerns for the state's population, and created a sense of injustice among them as the center increased its control with each new agreement. The situation was aggravated by the prospect of Gandhi losing support among the broader Hindu electorate across the north of the country if any attempt at resolution risked causing discontent in Haryana, making the sacrifice of the interests of Punjabi farmers less politically damaging in comparison.

==== Nehr Roko Morcha ====
Bhindranwale's focus was the unfulfilled promises and the unconstitutional and unaccountable drain of Punjab's resources, especially water resources, by the central government. Awareness of the water issue created by the Congress leadership spread among the people of rural Punjab, and they looked to Bhindranwale to protect their socio-economic and religious aspirations; Bhindranwale assured them that he would not allow vested interests to betray the cause of Punjab, especially in the socio-economic field. Following failed talks, the Nehr Roko Morcha, or "struggle to stop the canal", was launched on April 24, 1982 by the Akali Dal at the village of Kapuri, Punjab to prevent the initial digging of the SYL Canal which would have diverted most of the state's water to Haryana, resulting in volunteer arrests. The Dharam Yudh Morcha was launched later that year on 4 August, following an Akali Dal meeting in July at Amritsar; Bhindranwale and Jathedar Jagdev Singh Talwandi were persuaded to lead it under the Akali Dal banner and Longowal's leadership, and began with Akalis courting arrest with a large number of volunteers. Bhindranwale, leaving his base in Chowk Mehta for the Golden Temple, joined his movement to have Amrik Singh and two other followers released after his arrest on 19 July to the larger Akali movement for their political, economic, cultural, and religious demands; Amrik Singh had offended the appointed Punjab Governor Marri Chenna Reddy by protesting the mass arrest of the Akali volunteers and pleading their case.

=== Agrarian ===
The centralization of such powers, which India has been described as having "made too much use of", also included the central government using Punjabi money to finance other regions of India by channelling a high proportion of agrarian and commercial savings deposits to the banks of other states. with only about 35% of money invested within Punjab's banks remaining within Punjab. The government also did not provide the state with any industrial outlets for its sugar and cotton surpluses, and did not increase the river-water allocation required by new wheat strains and farming practices, which affected soil and water systems and created ecological vulnerability.

The Green Revolution had caused a sudden spike in prosperity, development, and agricultural production in the state in the first five years following its formation in 1966, in spite of political instability. While poor landowners (57% of cultivators, defined as owning less than 5 acres) owned a disproportionally small fraction of the land (15%) compared to rich landowners (owners of more than ten acres, 23% of landowners owning 65% of available farmland), all farmers were increasingly concerned over crop prices and input costs. The Akalis made attempts to ameliorate these concerns by catering mostly to its rural constituency by easing land taxes on the poor and procuring loans for inputs in the early 70s; conflicting attitudes to farming prices and costs highlighted tensions between the central and state governments, to which Akalis attributed their electoral loss in 1972, and which contributed to the drafting of the Anandpur Sahib Resolution.

Farming had been becoming unprofitable as crop prices fell, and farm infrastructure and supply costs increased by 20-30%. Power and water shortages, and increases in power and fuel costs, as well as fertilizer and pesticides, also progressively made irrigation and transport prohibitively expensive for both rich landlords and farmers with small holdings, who were the worst hit, and who would often mortgage their land to purchase farming equipment. The central government also controlled agricultural prices, set price ceilings on crops, limiting farmer profits, and small farmers also suffered from the lack of fair-pricing policies for wheat and paddy. During her second term, Gandhi's interests remained as opposed to Punjab's as in her first, and the top end of price ceilings she instituted had increased at less than half the rate (5-10%) of input costs, with Punjabi farmers taking the brunt of the losses. Additionally, in 1980, hailstorms across Punjab resulted in a poor wheat harvest; Gandhi, in addition to refusing to raise the price the government would pay for wheat, limited the sale of the wheat to restricted "food zones" that prohibited wheat sales even to other districts within Punjab, and prohibited wheat dealers to hold substantial amount of wheat in storage. During the Emergency, Punjab was allotted only 23% of its own waters, and upon reelection, Gandhi raised the allotment only 1%, solely to silence her opposition on the technicality that she had legally raised it, while allotting neighboring Haryana state 10% more water than it ever needed, another blow to the farmers of Punjab. The allocation of waters to other states limited canal irrigation and forced farmers to use more expensive, complicated, and environmentally unsound tube-wells. While this was happening, the lowering of the land ceiling from 30 to 17.5 acres, in line with the socialistic policies of the Congress at the time, also antagonized larger landowners, and Zail Singh was credited by admirers with "humbling the Jat leaders." This was seen by the Akalis as a political stunt.

During the implementation of all these restrictions, the Akali Dal had accomplished little in response, and in addition, the possibility of forging an Akali-Congress partnership in Punjab was being discreetly explored. This caused the decline of support for the Akalis and the concurrent increase of support for Bhindranwale's message among both educated orthodox Sikhs and the rural population, along with what was increasingly seen as the ineffectual Akali approach of protests and inter-party collaboration in producing results for Punjab, leaving open a political space for those who argued that increased militancy was the only means for protecting Sikh interests.

The process of mechanization of agriculture was also releasing more labor onto the market, mostly college-educated youth. In addition, industrial development was hindered by restrictive licensing policy, and from 1974, Punjab's quota of armed forces recruitment was decreased, planned to be decreased from 20% to 2%, a concern voiced by Bhindranwale, resulting in further joblessness among the population. Other government centralizations and deprivations included to the nationalization of the Punjab & Sind Bank, the granting of minimal central aid to Punjab in relation to its tax contribution, and the failure to establish a dry port at Amritsar, among other industrial developments.

Another factor had been the backlash against campaigns of mass sterilization in earlier decades, under Western influence, which affected working-class and low-caste citizens particularly, in attempted population control. Of all states affected by sterilization, Punjab had had the highest rate of citizens sterilized, with 60,000 by 1965. This had, according to Punjab officials, put the state "on a war footing". Compulsory sterilization was brought back in 1976 during the Emergency under Sanjay Gandhi.

=== Industrial ===
Adding to center-state tensions was an increasing perception among Akali ministers of the early '70s that the Punjab was getting a much smaller share of developmental funds from the Centre than its due. After the Punjabi Suba division in 1966, the industrial development was confined to Haryana and mineral and forest resources went to Himachal Pradesh, with Punjab's own industrial sector kept undeveloped on the pretext of Punjab being a "sensitive border state" susceptible to easy invasion in wartime, and Punjabi industrial growth was kept weak by promoting it in other states, using raw commodities extracted from Punjab. The growth of industrial employment was negligible during the 1970s, and the lack of central investments in industries precipitated the Akalis' demands that Punjab was not receiving its fair share of central revenues given its contribution. Similar sentiments were echoed by Sikh farmers and peasants who felt that they were not getting their due and that much of the benefit of their efforts were flowing to other parts of the country. The little industrial development that existed, concentrated in Amritsar, Jalandhar, and Ludhiana, was limited to some small-scale industries like woollen textiles and garments, machine tools, and farming implements, financed largely by remittances from overseas Sikhs. The continued widening of the gap between the agrarian economy and industrialization, as well as the failure to develop other industries to absorb unemployed youth, exacerbated the situation; Large numbers of educated Punjabi youth were forced to go elsewhere to seek gainful employment, in turn attracting semi-skilled and unskilled labor from other states, which led to growing discontent among many sections of society, fueling wide discontent among the masses as the benefits started to fade.

These economic developments occurred during Congress rule between 1971 and 1977, and Punjab had lost economic and political rights as power was increasingly centralized; this had spurred the Akali Dal to give its formal support to the Anandpur Sahib Resolution in 1978, demanding financial autonomy and jurisdiction over its own administration and law, and seeking the restriction of central powers to foreign affairs, defense, and communications, as the problems had occurred as a result of the control of irrigation, power, development, and control of riparian headworks and dam construction had remained with New Delhi over Punjab, exacerbating the state's water and power needs. A Deputy Advocate General would attribute the growing separatist sentiments for Khalistan to this, saying, "Overcentralization will not keep India united."

=== Devolutionary ===
Leading the Congress party, Indira Gandhi adopted a highly autocratic, authoritarian approach with an aggressive agenda of centralization, and in 1980 put nine states, including Punjab, whose governments were unfavorable to the central government, under President's Rule, dismissing the Akali Dal joint government in Punjab. This had been preceded by the Emergency, which had been protested by the Akalis amidst mass arrests of tens of thousands.

The Akalis had earlier pushed for more autonomy in decision-making over taxation and spending, with fewer strings attached to central transfers. In a speech at the party's 1978 Ludhiana conference, Gurcharan Singh Tohra called for more taxation powers to the states, among other federalistic ideas in keeping with the promises of the national constitution, with the idea that if the state retained more taxation powers, it could better manage its own economy:

Apart from statutory share in the Union Revenues, the State should have the exclusive power to levy, collect, and retain the taxes, duties within their own sphere. For the purpose of uniformity of taxation in the States, the Centre may issue guidelines from time to time. Income tax should be provincialized; though it may be levied by the Centre for the sake of uniformity, the collection should be by and through the State Agencies. As the income tax is divisible between the Union and the States, the States after collection should contribute to the central pool a fixed share out of the income tax revenue.

Several other Indian states also argued that discretionary transfers contributed to increased centralization during the 1960s and 1970s. According to an Akali politician interviewed in 1973, "What I stress is more economic and financial powers to the states. The justification of the demands is that the yoke of the center will go. States would work independently and they will not have to run to Delhi for each and every thing."

Even among some militants in the late 1980s after Bhindranwale's death, similar financial concerns were raised, with the leader of the Khalistan Commando Force, Wassan Singh Zaffarwal, stating, "Our development policies also were controlled by the center. Even our local tax collection was transferred to the center. The state government was a state government only in name." In the late 1970s and early 1980s, a significant portion of central resources going to Punjab was discretionary grants and loans, the kind of transfers with the most conditions attached. Regional politicians in several other states had also reacted against such strings attached and several states also criticized central-state fiscal relations, but to the Akalis it seemed like the center was tightening its grip just when the Sikhs had won the struggle for a Punjabi Suba.

The retention of the planned city of Chandigarh as a union territory serving as capital for both Punjab and Haryana, which had been promised exclusively to Punjab as its state capital in 1970, also had long been a bone of contention between the federal government and the two states. Not willing to forego the Hindu votes from Haryana, Gandhi disregarded the 1970 promise and declared that the granting of Chandigarh to Punjab would require a territory swap that would have involved corridors deep into Punjab state, and an acceptable solution was never reached. This exacerbated resentment among the Sikhs in Punjab, who viewed it as discrimination.

== Response ==
The Akali movement gained momentum in August and September, and the government began to run out of room in jails for the over 25,000 volunteer protesters. Over 250,000 protesters would be arrested over the course of the morcha. The central government, instead of preempting any Akali agitation in regard to the Punjab by constitutionally referring all the legal issues to the Supreme Court, which the Akali Dal had demanded, played up the threat of extremism and law and order, choosing to make scapegoats out of the police, the Administration and the Chief Minister for pursuing its own political designs, and appeared disinclined to solve the issues justly or constitutionally. The government also framed the movement as a religious issue, announcing only the granting of symbolic requests to holy city status to Amritsar and the right to wear kirpans, while ignoring the more numerous economic issues central to the Declaration and the morcha in the interests of all residents of Punjab to prevent the economic ruin of the state. The considered view of the Governor of West Bengal sent to Punjab, B. D. Pande, that a political problem required a political solution, went unheeded.

In response to demands that the Supreme Court be consulted in regards to concerns that the center was unconstitutionally usurping water from Punjab, the central government found loopholes to circumvent such a demand, instead offering a tribunal, which did not have the authority to override the Punjab Reorganization Act to begin with, and never issued a final decision over an issue critical to agricultural growth and state development.

Since the launch of the April 1982 morcha against the SYL Canal, followed by provocations like police crackdowns and the behavior of the Haryana government in November 1982, when Sikhs traveling between Punjab and Delhi were indiscriminately stopped, searched, and humiliated, it became increasingly clear that the government would seek a military solution to the unrest, instead of any political settlement, making elaborate plans for an army action while feigning readiness for negotiations and denying any intention of sending armed forces to the Darbar Sahib complex. This would lead to Bhindranwale, who had been warning of a government attack, to reside at the Akal Takht complex in December 1983. In October 1983, following the issuance of an ordinance, police had been given powers to search, arrest, and shoot who they wanted, immune from legal action.

=== 1982 Asian Games ===
Following protestor deaths, Swaran Singh restarted negotiations on behalf of Gandhi with the Akalis after releasing all arrested Akali volunteers, reaching agreements on Chandigarh, river waters, Centre-State relations, and the Amritsar broadcast, which were approved by a cabinet subcommittee. While Swaran Singh relayed the government's approval of the agreement, Gandhi had unilaterally altered it significantly before submitting it to Parliament. The talks would collapse after this action, and Longowal would announce in November 1982 the continuation of the protests in Delhi during the 1982 Asian Games, in order to draw international attention to the matter. Former attorney general of West Bengal, Dipanker Gupta, wrote that, "But what is perhaps unknown to many is that on the eve of the inauguration of the Asiad in 1982, an agreement was actually arrived at between the Congress (I) and the Akalis. While the Akali leaders... and the Congress (I) mediators were toasting this event and waiting for the official declaration from the cabinet, Indira Gandhi suddenly announced that the agreement was not acceptable to her." According to Khushwant Singh, "In sheer disgust the Akalis decided to embarrass the central government by letting the world know how they were being treated. They organized bands of volunteers to raise anti-government slogans at the Asian Games," the response to which the central government would prosecute through Bhajan Lal, the Chief Minister of Haryana.

Another round of talks between the Akalis and Congress MP Amrinder Singh was successful, but was sabotaged by Bhajan Lal, who stated that protests, which were largely stifled, would not be allowed in Haryana during the event. The Haryana police, under instruction from Bhajan Lal in repayment of Congress' favorable river water allocation for his state, harassed and maltreated any Sikhs travelling through his state by rail or road to Delhi with "needless and excessive" force, in a "calculated attempt to insult" and "jeer at [their] religious symbols." Sikhs allowed to pass through, regardless of social position, whether retired or serving police or military officer, politician (even Congress MPs), or ordinary citizen, were subjected to various procedures including invasive friskings and removal of turbans, in addition to resulting in deaths. Sikh travellers were waylaid by armed gangs. Over 1,500 Sikhs were arrested, along with countless friskings on the Punjab-Haryana border including retired officers Air Chief Marshal Arjan Singh, Lt. Gen. Jagjit Singh Aurora, and Maj. Gen. Shabeg Singh.

Sikhs began to be singled out in other states as well; the Jai Hindu Sangh called for the expulsion of all Sikhs from the state of Rajasthan in December 1983.

Sikhs understood this humiliation not just individually but as a community, and according to journalist Kuldip Nayyar, "from that day their feeling of alienation [had] been increasing."

=== Police violence ===
Under the pretext of maintaining law and order, central state actions in the form of false encounters, tortures and killings in police custody, as well as extrajudicial police invasions and oppressive lockdowns in rural Punjab, increased. It became known that during the period, certain police officials and others had been guilty of excesses or violence. Atrocities committed by named officers were narrated in open meetings by Bhindranwale or the concerned victims, but neither the charges of the victims, reports to the authorities, nor other complaints were responded to by the administration to rectify current complaints or improve future procedures, much less for punishing the offenders. This perceived official apathy and callousness led many began to believe that what was happening was pursuant to the studied direction of the administration, and that state violence was being practiced to defame Sikhs to turn public opinion in order to sidetrack the real issues of state resources and constitutional procedure, as neither issues nor reported rights violations were being addressed. Bhindranwale spoke of staged crimes, in which Sikhs were accused of theft or violence, with the intention of linking the falsely accused to Bhindranwale, with any declared act being said to be on his orders, and that many of the Sikhs arrested on false accusations were tortured and killed. Accusations of excessive force on the Sikhs also included the earlier burning of buses belonging to the Damdami Taksal containing Sikh scriptures, and Sikh train passengers being singled out and beaten on false pretenses.

Out of 220 deaths during the first 19 months of the Dharam Yudh Morcha, 190 had been Sikhs, with over 160 Sikhs killed during the first 16 months, with the Akalis alleging that reprisal killings were being done by agent provocateurs, and reports appearing that such communal incidents had been initiated by Congress to inflame Hindu feelings. Despite emphatic demands for a detailed judicial enquiry, the central government was unwilling to initiate any such process. Extrajudicial killings by the police of orthodox Sikh youth in rural areas during the summer and winter of 1982 and early 1983 resulted in retaliatory violence; by the summer of 1983, an average of 50 Sikh youth were detained by police and six killed per week.

Bhindranwale was particularly upset about the police atrocities and the murder of scores of Sikhs in the garb of false and contrived police encounters. He was often heard criticizing the double standards of the Government in treating Hindu and Sikh victims of violence, citing various incidents like the immediate appointment of an enquiry committee to probe Lala Jagat Narain's murder and none for the killing of the Sikhs, including the 4 April Rasta Roko police killings, believing that this partisan behavior of the Government was bound to hasten the process of alienation of the Sikhs. He reprimanded the press for suppressing instances of police atrocities, and of the double standards of dealing with Sikhs:

Take the case of Pawan Kumar, President of the Hindu Suraksha Samiti [in Patiala district], they found 230 grenades in his house and he didn't go to jail for even an hour. A Sikh who doesn't even possess empty cartridges, if there is only suspicion against him, they shoot him to death.

On discrimination:

There are separate laws for the Sikhs and the Hindus. If a Lala (Jagat Narain) is killed there are warrants within six days and I am arrested. If 18 young Sikhs are killed, their mothers and sisters insulted, their houses burnt and crops destroyed and their religious books burnt, no case is registered. The Government does not move for months.

A team sponsored by the PUCL, with Justice V. M. Tarkunde as Chairman and famed journalist Kuldip Nayar as a member, to assess the police excesses against Sikhs. It reported:

We had no hesitation in saying in our report that the police had behaved like a barbarian force out for revenge. They had even set houses of a few absconders on fire and destroyed utensils, clothes and whatever else they found in them. Relatives of the absconders were harassed and even detained. Even many days after the excesses committed by the police, we could see how fear-stricken the people were. Villagers gave us the names of some of the police sub-inspectors and deputy superintendents involved; some of them, they said, had a reputation of taking the law into their hands.

Though Akali demands were largely for the developmental welfare of the state of Punjab as a whole, with no demands in regards to other communities and was directed at the government, police killings, including extrajudicial actions of fatal torture and mutilations of detainees, with some subsequently declared as escapees, as well as unprovoked attacks on innocent individual Sikhs were carried out by bandhs, or mobs, of the Hindi Suraksha Samiti, mobilized by the Arya Samaj, sparked off retributory attacks against them by Sikh youths. Bhindranwale, commenting on the hitherto peaceful movement during a speech on 18 May 1983, but noting the failure of persuasion, legal recourse, and appeals to address police atrocities, mentioned that there were "limits to peacefulness", particularly among the youth, in efforts to "save the turban".

Talk is not enough against injustice. We have to act. Here you raise swords but tomorrow you may dust the [sandals] of Bibi Indira. And you behave so even when if a Hindu is killed they point a finger at the Sikhs before they know the culprit. Before a proper investigation has been conducted they say it is the Sikhs! We have the right to be Sikhs and to live by the tenets of the Guru and they have no business to lay every crime at our door.... When it is a question of sacrifice it is the Sikhs who sacrifice. When it is a question of rewards and prizes they restrict entry into the services. Why should there be this injustice? We are not bound to defend the country if this is how the government behaves. I appeal for unity.

=== Rasta Roko Morcha ===
To reignite hitherto stalled government talks, the Akalis organized another protest of peaceful Sikh protesters in a Rasta Roko agitation on 4 April 1983, killing 24, Shoot-on-site orders had been issued by the government on the eve of the agitation, which was nevertheless successful.

The police opened fire at various places in Punjab to disperse Akali protesters, who had erected barricades and squatted on roads. Six were killed in Kup Kalan village in Sangrur district, five in Malerkotla, two near Dera Bassi in Bhankharpur, one in Patiala, one in Rajpura, one in Phagwara, one in Ferozpur, and two in Bathinda district. Those killed included a minor girl and a woman.

The Akalis announced a "Condolence Day" to be observed in Punjab on 8 April, in memory of those killed.

==== Marjīwaṛe and further morchas ====
On the ongoing anti-Sikh violence in Haryana mobilized by Bhajan Lal, Longowal declared, "I want to tell Mrs Gandhi that our patience is getting exhausted. She should stop playing with fire in Punjab, it is not Assam. Let her test. If we can die at the hands of the police chanting satināmu wāhegurū, we can die like the soldiers we are. Once the cup of patience is full, it will be difficult for me to hold the people. We will tolerate no further ruse until she stops playing Holi with our blood."

He issued a call in early 1983 to Sikh ex-servicemen to meet at Anandpur Sahib, answered by over 5,000 volunteers including retired generals J.S. Bhullar and Narinder Singh, including to train as non-violent self-sacrifice groups called marjīwaṛe to continue the increasingly dangerous protests. On 13 April 1983, he administered an oath to 33,000 volunteers, with plans to do so to 100,000 in 3 parts. Many of the servicemen had been alienated by the treatment they had received during the 1982 Asian Games security searches singling out Sikhs.

In addition to the Rasta Roko campaign on 4 April, the Rail Roko morcha ("stop the trains campaign") on June 17, and the highly successful Kamm Roko morcha ("stop work campaign") on 29 August were also held. Except for the Rasta Roko protest in which protesters died in police firing, all others had ended peacefully. In total, over 200,000 Sikhs would court arrest during the movement, conducted strictly in a non-violent satyagraha manner.

=== Reprisals ===
After the launch of the Dharam Yudh Morcha, and subsequent governmental inaction in regards to police brutality, Sikh activists began committing retaliatory acts of political violence. During Bhindranwale's time, both his critics and supporters agree that Indian police had been using the term 'encounters' as a euphemism for "cold-blooded murder" carried out extra-judiciously against alleged 'terrorists.' This fact was acknowledged by then Chief Minister of Punjab, Darbara Singh. These deadly encounters were justified as a reasonable method of avoiding lengthy court trials. An assassination attempt was made on Chief Minister of Punjab Darbara Singh and two Indian Airlines flights were commandeered by Dal Khalsa activists.

Bhindranwale, then regarded as the "single most important Akali leader," announced that nothing less than full implementation of the Anandpur resolution was acceptable to them. The Sikh volunteers who answered his call on 3 September 1983 were not satisfied with either the methods or the results of Longowal's methods, as a rift emerged between the two leaders, with Bhindranwale referring to Longowal's rooms in the Golden Temple complex as "Gandhi Niwas" ("Gandhi residence"), and Longowal referring to his rooms as a wild "Chambal" region. Bhindranwale would denounce the double standard of Congress-supporting hijackers, who had demanded the release of Indira Gandhi after her post-Emergency arrest, being rewarded with seats in the Uttar Pradesh legislative assembly, while demanding punishment for Sikh protesters who had done the same after Bhindranwale's detainment. He would comment in 1982, "If the Pandey brothers in Uttar Pradesh hijack a plane for a woman (Mrs. Gandhi) they are rewarded with political positions. If the Sikhs hijack a plane to Lahore and that too for a cause, they are dubbed traitors. Why two laws for the same crime?" With the release of Amrik Singh in July 1983, Bhindranwale felt confident of the advancement of the movement without the Akali leadership; they would part ways in December, two months after the imposition of President's Rule.

== Early 1984 ==
In regards to the protest movement, Indian journalist Pran Chopra observed in December 1983, "Mrs. Gandhi has lost the art of the politics of accommodation or, more likely, has lost interest in it. Therefore, she does not want to, or no longer knows how to, weave group identities into a national whole. She breaks such identities as she can.... But what she cannot break, she merely alienates. That is the real cause of the Punjab problem." As Congress' power as a pan-Indian party had begun to be seriously challenged by various coalitions in an increasingly complex political scene after Nehru, Indira Gandhi had started cultivating a majoritarian votebank, presenting a more outwardly Hindu image to begin to ingratiate herself to the majority, after her economic and social slogans had grown less effective. Congress increasingly sought to deal with quandaries posed by minorities by consolidating this votebank along religious lines for electoral gain, triggering fears among minorities regarding their identity preservation.

As the government continued its typical bureaucratic practice of putting off the implementation of Akali demands with interminable meetings, and the charade of negotiations entered its third year, over 150 notable citizens, including high-ranking civilians and military, authors, journalists, artists, lawyers, doctors, and other professionals of Delhi, described as the country's top intelligentsia by the Tribune newspaper of Chandigarh, issued a public statement on 22 January 1984, urging the central government to abandon its policy of delay and apathy towards the demands of the Akali protest movement:

It is imperative that the demands voiced in Punjab be demarcated as demands not of a particular community but of a region as a whole. This is the context in which they must be seen and pressed.... On the face of it, none of these demands seem to be insuperable. It is the Centre's inaction, its disquieting lack of will to take decisions, that has allowed the frenetic play of extremist forces to flourish and grow... There has been enough talk and discussion. Agreements have been reached on several occasions. They have not been honoured or implemented. The Union government owes the Indian people an explanation for its inaction and drift.

It was reported by non-governmental sources that the terms of a settlement were to be finalized at no less than five different occasions, but that Indira Gandhi, not the Akalis, had backed out at the last minute each time.

When the insurgency against the central government began, it was against the main backdrop of unresolved Anandpur Sahib Resolution claims and an increased sense of disillusionment with the democratic process, which when it worked seemed to end up with Sikhs' not achieving satisfactory representation, and when it did not, ended up with the dictatorship of Emergency rule, as well as the backdrop of communal conflict on the subcontinent which gave Sikhs a historical justification to fear for the future of their religion in a Hindi-dominated state. The failure of the central government to address political, social, and economic problems of the Sikhs facilitated the rise of militancy. Sikh demands had been fundamentally political rather than religious, while prolonged intransigence by the central government on water, state border, and devolutionary issues, in addition to centralization, led to alienation and militancy. Bhindranwale accused Indira Gandhi of sending Darbara Singh, former Congress chief minister of Punjab, to "wreak atrocities on the Sikh nation."

On 8 February 1984, the Akalis held a successful bandh to demonstrate their strength and continued commitment to non-violent struggle. The following week, a tripartite talk with five cabinet ministers, five Akali leaders, and fifteen leaders from opposition parties came close to a successful settlement, but was deliberately sabotaged once again by Bhajan Lal with more anti-Sikh violence in Haryana. This was followed by Akali maneuvers to express frustration in further protests, leading to their arrest along with many volunteers.

=== Planned Grain Roko Morcha ===
In May 1984, Longowal announced a planned Grain Roko morcha to be initiated on June 3, the day Operation Blue Star would be launched, practicing civil disobedience by refusing to pay land revenue, water or electricity bills, and block the flow of grain out of Punjab. Gandhi's emissaries met Akali leaders on May 27 to once again suggest the negotiation of a settlement, but though the Akalis showed signs of yielding, Bhindranwale would accept nothing short of the full implementation of the Anandpur Sahib Resolution. Faced with the prospect of losing revenue and resources from Punjab as a result of the planned Akali morcha, and unwilling to consider the resolution, which, despite stating the state to be an integral part of the country, they characterized as secessionist, the government proceeded with Operation Blue Star, which had been planned for nearly 18 months prior, from nearly the beginning of the Dharam Yudh Morcha, prior to any militancy. Prior to the attack, there had been reports that a hukamnama was likely to be issued soon from the Akal Takht, commanding Sikhs to congregate at the Golden Temple for defense against an imminent army attack. According to Gandhi's principal secretary P. C. Alexander, it would be Longowal's announcement of withholding Punjabi grain and tax from the central government that had been the true "last straw" for Gandhi to send the army when she did.

== After the morcha ==
=== Aftermath of Blue Star ===
Following the operation, as part of the terms of his surrender and arrest, Harchand Singh Longowal was made to disavow the Anandpur Sahib Resolution. The true insurgency would begin after the operation.

On 29 April 1986, close to 50,000 Sikhs gathered in a Sarbat Khalsa in Amritsar, where a declaration for Khalistan was announced. A five-member council was selected to lead the movement.

The 400-strong Khalistan Commando Force, or KCF, which emerged after Blue Star, was led by Wassan Singh Zafarwal and would later become the official armed wing of the first Panthic Committee formed on 26 January 1986, the day of the scheduled transfer of Chandigarh to Punjab; the Bhindranwale Tiger Force for Khalistan, led by Gurbachan Singh Manochahal, which splintered off from the KCF; the Babbar Khalsa, and the now-militarized AISSF, and as well as subsequent other splinter groups, organized after Blue Star. The various factions of the movement, which would eventually number nearly twenty, would coalesce into a definable force by April 1986. These militant groups came under three different coordinating committees called Panthic Committees, though operating relatively free of each other, at times pursuing different goals, at times forming short alliances, and at times infighting. The most warnings placed by the militants in newspapers, 34%, would be against other militants, as they were aware that infighting distracted them from their stated cause, or expressly against "looters, extortionists, or anti-social elements" pretending to be militants, and 17% would be warnings against police.

=== Akali schisms ===
The Akalis would attempt to cater to the growing sense of Sikh resentment in a major conference at Anandpur Sahib in March 1985 to plan a course of action to make the government accede to its preconditions for talks. Some Akali leaders resolved to start a new morcha within the month if the government did not meet the preconditions, which included a judicial inquiry into the anti-Sikh pogrom, the release of all Sikh arrested after Blue Star, rehabilitation of Sikh soldiers, the lifting of laws declaring Punjab a "disturbed area", the withdrawal of security forces from Punjab, and the reinstatement of the AISSF. After the senior leadership left, the conference would end with other leaders leading the massive crowd in cheering and sloganeering for Jarnail Singh Bhindranwale as well as for Beant Singh, and Satwant Singh for several hours. The central government recognized the growing alienation in the state and the need to forestall it, unexpectedly releasing Longowal, Talwandi, and Barnala later that month. The government had been talking with Longowal for months, and hoped that he would consolidate Sikh support behind elements amenable to the government, though both the Akali Dal and the center would be alarmed at the small, unenthusiastic crowds he attracted after his release. In contrast, Akali dissident Talwandi attracted huge, energetic Sikh crowds with his confrontational stance toward the government, refusing to compromise on the Anandpur Sahib Resolution, and denouncing Longowal:

Longowal and Tohra are prople because of whom Sant Jarnail Singh Ji Khalsa Bhindranwale and his brave followers were riddled with bullets. There are the same leaders who used to say that if the Government entered the Golden Temple it will have to walk over their dead bodies. But when the crunch came they themselves jumped over the bodies of martyrs preferring the safety of army vehicles.

Longowal's poor reception among the Sikhs compared to Talwandi's would push him to take a less conciliatory tone with the government to avoid being politically marginalized, changing tone by visiting Bhindranwale's father, Joginder Singh, to pay respects, eulogizing the sacrifices of Beant Singh, Satwant Singh, and the AISSF, and criticizing Rajiv Gandhi (who had been elected by demonizing the Sikhs during his campaign) and Zail Singh as enemies of the Sikhs, with Rajiv Gandhi's tacit support; the strategy was to draw crowds toward Longowal, which somewhat succeeded. Other government measures to draw Sikh support toward Longowal were the release of Tohra and Parkash Singh Badal from jail, the rehabilitation of the AISSF, and a judicial inquiry into the anti-Sikh pogroms in Delhi (but not elsewhere).

==== Longowal and United factions ====
At this point, Joginder Singh, who would enter politics and announce the formation of the United Akali Dal by joining the Longowal and Talwandi factions under a committee of the senior Akali leaders, in the name of necessary unity of the panth during the period of crisis. Longowal had pledged to abide by any decisions taken by him in the interests of the panth in a letter while he visited him to gain favor with the Sikh electorate. The convenor was to be Simranjit Singh Mann, a former IPS officer who had resigned after Blue Star and gone underground, and had been arrested in December 1984 in connection with Indira Gandhi's assassination. While Mann was still in prison, Joginder Singh would convene.

With Joginder Singh possessing an aura of respectability that few Akali leaders could match, and with the Akali leadership, who had been surprised at the move, unable to risk publicly disrespecting him in regards to the Sikh base, Longowal, Badal, and Tohra would join the United Akali Dal, but as ordinary members, to avoid taking part in the party's ad hoc committee even after repeatedly asked to by Joginder Singh. In doing so, they sought to preserve a future path to re-assume Sikh leadership later by protecting their political interests and avoiding shared responsibility for any decisions under Joginder Singh's leadership, under which the party would continue to only seek increased state devolution and the implementation of the Anandpur Sahib Resolution. The traditional leadership would be able to enjoy a majority in the party's general house and the alliance with the Akal Takht jathedar, Kirpal Singh, if they chose to resume leadership positions. Joginder Singh would lament,

Both Longowal and Talwandi had given me in writing that they would take whatever steps I thought best to bring unity in the panth at this critical and crucial hour and I decided to merge these two Dals and form a real Akali Dal, an organization of martyrs and not self-seekers. I included all major leaders in the committee... I have tried but with no success... God will grant us some sense.

In May 1985, 23 out of 26 factions of the Longowal faction rejected their resignations from leadership positions and ordered them to resume their posts, resulting in another Akali schism, with the dissident faction, the United Akali Dal, being led by Joginder Singh and Talwandi and supported by the resurgent AISSF and its leadership on one hand, and the Longowal Akali Dal led by Longowal, Tohra, and Badal on the other.

=== Rajiv-Longowal Accord ===
The central government provided the Longowal Akali Dal with further concessions to bolster its position in Sikh politics, but would rule out further concessions unless it entered talks for a settlement. Longowal would engage with the government unilaterally among the senior leadership, attending talks only with Barnala and ex-finance minister Balwant Singh, leaving out Badal, of whom a number of supporters had defected to the United Akali Dal, and Tohra, who was seen as a potential obstacle to the government in talks.

The Rajiv-Longowal Accord, negotiated in June 1985, after two days, gave provisions for the transfer of Chandigarh and Punjabi-speaking areas of Haryana to Punjab, and consideration of the riparian issue to a tribunal to be presided over by a Supreme Court Judge. Addressing almost all of the demands that Indira had rejected, the accord would have likely put an end to the conflict. Though it was hailed by the media and the opposition for its potential, it suffered from a lack of specificity in regards to its provisions, which were either contingent, or postponed their resolution by referring them to various commissions. While "probably" supported by a portion of the electorate, many Sikhs felt it to be too much of a compromise on the Anandpur Sahib Resolution, and felt that the Longowal had sold out the panth for his faction's self-interests; the Accord would indeed help the Longowal Akalis to win the next state election in September 1985, despite the dissident United Akali Dal/AISSF boycott of the election. In addition, Badal and Tohra of the Longowal faction, left out of the negotiations, also rejected the Accord, citing the same reasons of specificity and selling out on the Resolution, a sentiment shared by the United Akali Dal and the AISSF, who stated that the accord had been made only in an "individual capacity" and betrayed the Sikhs on every issue, and threatened to continue the morcha until the acceptance of the Resolution, stating, "These are the same men who swore in the scared presence of the [Guru Granth Sahib] that they would not give up the morcha until the Anandpur Sahib Resolution was accepted."

==== Longowal assassination ====
While Longowal would get a majority of Akali delegates to vote in favor of the Accord in mid-July 1985, and subsequently declare victory in the morcha, Badal and Tohra would be alienated in the process, and Longowal was left in the tough position of having to sell it to the wider Sikh community in Punjab. To accelerate the process of normalization, Congress would announce that both legislative assembly and parliamentary elections would be held in late September; the Longowal Akalis initially opposed the holding of elections until the implementation of the Accord, but eventually decided to participate, and Tohra and Badal would also fall into line to strategically protect their political interests.

Some of the militants also saw the agreement as little more than a sellout and a last resort for the Akalis to stay in power, and Longowal was assassinated on August 20, 1985. with the ostensible reason given as making peace with the son of Indira Gandhi, who had ordered Blue Star, and selling out the Sikh community. However, Kirpal Singh Dhillon, former DGP of Punjab and Madhya Pradesh, noted that there were "enough grounds" to suspect that the assassination was an inside job.

Barnala would take over as the leader of the Longowal faction, and to widen their appeal to Sikhs, in their election manifesto, the Longowal Akalis would mildly criticize the Congress and promise amnesty for all Sikhs in detention without serious charges. Due to the similar tone of the Longowal Akalis and Congress, with emphasis on the Accord as a solution for center-state tensions, and avoidance confrontational rhetoric, there were continual allegations, "probably well-founded", that a secret understanding had been forged between the two parties, with Congress intentionally fielding weak candidates to bolster the Longowal faction in comparison other Sikh political factions. The strategy would succeed, and the Akalis would win the election comfortably, with Rajiv Gandhi being able to cede Punjab to the Longowal Akalis as his position in the national parliament was overwhelming. Meanwhile, the United Akali Dal and AISSF's election boycott was successful in areas of Amritsar worst affected by Operation Blue Star and the subsequent Operation Woodrose, where over 100,000 Sikh youth would indiscriminately be killed or disappeared, without any due process, by police in villages throughout Punjab.

==== Under Barnala ====
As Barnala became the state's chief minister, Tohra and Badal would back him, with Tohra promised support for his SGPC presidential run, but Badal turning down a cabinet position to hedge his political bets with a "wait-and-see" approach, as his own supporters were split among the two Akali factions, and as Barnala was faced with numerous heavy obstacles to overcome, regardless of his party's large assembly majority. In addition to Badal and Tohra, who would be kept at political distance as they were seen to be potential rivals who would undermine him at the opportune time, the United Akali Dal and AISSF continued to retain significant support in the Sikh community.

Barnala's success would hinge on his election promises, including the implementation of the Rajiv-Longowal Accord, and ameliorating Sikh discontent by publicly resenting Blue Star. Barnala and his ministers, including Amarinder Singh, who would later defect to Congress in 1992, would release hundreds of Sikh detainees, provide jobs to victims of state repression, rehabilitate Sikh army deserters and riot victims, and refuse to visit the government-built Akal Takht, which was torn down and rebuilt by the Sikh community. As part of the balancing act, Barnala's Akalis would continue to solicit support for the Accord from the United Akali Dal and AISSF, as both the AISSF and Joginder Singh, as the father of Jarnail Singh Bhindranwale, were still respected for their sacrifices, and they would praise Barnala for his efforts with Sikh detainees and victims, though they would continue to call on Sikh youth to "struggle to face the black deeds of the [central] government and for unconditional release of all [remaining] detained Sikhs."

As for the militant groups, while they had been united after Blue Star, and political insurgency would result in several further raids in the residential area of the Golden Temple Complex by police. These operations, reminiscent of Blue Star, would damage relations between the incumbent Barnala government on one side, and the United Akali Dal, the AISSF, and large sections of the Sikh community, and Barnala would be stuck between them and the Congress government, which was unwilling to concede to their demands.

Signs of schism would also appear among the factions of the Sikh movement rivalling Barnala as well beginning in 1985, as the United Akali Dal under Joginder Singh and the AISSF/Damdami Taksal also jostled for leadership of their side. The 1986 rebuilding of the Akal Takht, to replace the government-rebuilt Sarkari Takht, was announced in December 1985 by the SGPC under Tohra, scheduled for January. A day after the announcement, the AISSF and Damdami Taksal would also hold a shaheedi samagam ("martyr remembrance") of 500 Sikh fighters including Jarnail Singh Bhindranwale, honoring their families. Following the samagam, the congregation declared that the rebuilding should be done under the Damdami Taksal's guidance, not the SGPC, due to their sacrifices in protecting the complex during the operation. This would introduce another factional rivalry.

=== Failure of the Accord ===
Political dithering and non-resolution of water and boundary disputes, along with Congress centralization, would increase Sikh disillusionment with the central government. The Congress government would not follow up with its promises in the Accord, and the failure of the Accord stemmed with Congress' electoral concerns with other states, particularly Haryana. Importantly, the first main provision was broken as Chandigarh was not transferred to Punjab by January 2, 1986. Delayed to March, then July of that year, Chandigarh remains unintegrated. It had again been made contingent on the transfer of territory from deep in Punjab which did not share a border with Haryana, and was to be connected by a corridor; as it would have ceded Punjabi-speaking villages as well, the January 26th deadline for the extended talks also passed without result. This seriously damaged the credibility of the Accord, with the central government failing to boost the Barnala faction of the Akali Dal as planned, and center-state tensions would escalate again that year.

Barnala and Haryana chief minister Bhajan Lal, who had been in contentious talks regarding the territorial adjustment, both wanted to retain the support of their constituencies. Bhajan Lal would warn Rajiv Gandhi that not supporting Haryana's claim would alienate the Hindu voters of not just Haryana but the rest of the Hindi belt, also pointing out the continued insurgency and Hindi voter dissatisfaction with it. Rajiv would warn Barnala to address the insurgency in the state, after which Barnala would arrest hundreds of AISSF members, sparking accusations in the Sikh community that Barnala was acting as a proxy for the central government, acting on Gandhi's orders so Congress could retain Hindi Belt votes.

In May 1987, the Supreme Court further reduced Punjab's share and doubled Haryana's, with the riparian question outweighed by Congress' electoral concerns with other states, particularly Haryana and its June 1986 elections, after they lost the Assam state elections in December 1985, leaving the river water issue, on Punjab's agenda since 1966, unresolved. This additional failure to implement a promise in the accord further weakened the position of the Barnala Akalis, and empowered both the political dissident and militant factions less conciliatory with the government, including within Barnala's own party, as the insurgency continued.

As for the insurgency, the death of Longowal and the failure of the Accord would for a period make it a more effective alternative than the political approach. The death toll would skyrocket after the operation from a few hundred a year to thousands, intensifying particular between 1988 and 1991. as the splintering militant groups increasingly targeted each other, with an increasing civilian toll. In a warning published in Ajit on September 25, 1990, militant leaders Gurbachan Singh Manochahal and Gurjant Singh Rajasthani appealed to and warned against militant organizations engaging in fratricide, emphasizing the need for orienting the struggle against the central government. Segments of the population found informing or cooperating with the police, selling intoxicants, behaving inappropriately with women, cheating on exams, or what was considered as breaking Sikh conduct principles by some militant factions like engaging in ostentatiousness, were also targeted as violence increased in the late 1980s. Though the insurgency initially enjoyed a wide base of support, this would eventually weaken it to a certain extent, as well as their ranks being infiltrated by lumpen and criminal elements who joined for money rather than the long-cherished cause of a Sikh homeland, as well as the incarceration and killing of prominent militant leaders, which would enable the infiltration and interference of federal agencies, causing the movement to lose direction. The insurgency would nevertheless endure for a decade due to the resentment already sown by the centralizing policies of the state that would lead to Sikh alienation, the increase in secessionist support following Operation Blue Star and the subsequent pogroms, and external diaspora financial support. The failed implementation of the Resolution or the Accord, due to the Congress central government's concern for its hold in other Congress-led states, also played an important role in fueling these social divisions in Punjab, as it discredited the Akali Dal, which, riven by internal divisions and opposed by a growing number of insurgent groups, could neither rule the state nor deal with the central government effectively.

These issues of the allocation of the capital city of Chandigarh, which is the only state capital in the country to be shared with another state, adjustment of some of the territorial claims of Punjab, with many large Punjabi-speaking areas left out of the allocated state, and the distribution of river waters, continue to figure prominently in Punjab politics and remain unresolved points of contention between the state and the central government.

== See also ==
- Rasta Roko Morcha
