= Sutlej Yamuna link canal =

Canal under construction in India

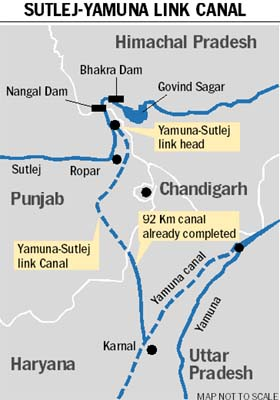
Proposed Canal Link - Status as in March 2016

Satluj Yamuna Link Canal or SYL as it is popularly known, is an under-construction 214-kilometer (133 mi) long canal in India to connect the Sutlej and Yamuna rivers. However, the proposal met obstacles and was referred to the Supreme Court of India. It was defined as river water sharing between the states of Punjab and Haryana.

== History ==
In 1955, the states of Punjab, Patiala and East Punjab States Union (PEPSU), Rajasthan and Jammu and Kashmir came to an agreement regarding the distribution of water from the three eastern rivers of the Indus river system, viz., Ravi, Beas and Sutlej. Punjab was allocated 7.3 billion m^{3} and PEPSU 1.6 billion m^{3} out of the estimated 19.55 billion m^{3} of water while Rajasthan gained 9.9 billion m^{3} and Jammu and Kashmir the remaining 0.80 billion m^{3}. With the merger of Punjab and PEPSU in 1956, the total share of Punjab became 8.9 billion m^{3}. The Indus Water Treaty with Pakistan was signed in 1960 and allowed India unrestricted use of water from the three eastern rivers.

The dispute regarding sharing of river water emerged after Punjab was reorganised in 1966, and the state of Haryana was created. Haryana demanded 5.9 billion m^{3} out of Punjab's total 8.9 billion m^{3} share of water, while Punjab claimed the entire quantity of water. Haryana asked the Union government to intervene as no agreement could be reached. In 1976, when the country was under an internal emergency, an executive order was issued by the Union government which allocated 4.3 billion m^{3} of water to both states while Delhi received the remaining 0.25 billion m^{3}. In order to make full use of the allocated water, a Sutlej-Yamuna Link Canal (SYL canal) was proposed. The decision was opposed in Punjab by Shromani Akali Dal. After coming to power in 1977, the party demanded that the water sharing between Punjab, Haryana and Rajasthan be adjudicated by the Supreme Court and filed a suit against the order of the Union government. The construction of canal was started in the same year by the Akali Dal government under its chief minister Prakash Singh Badal. The Haryana government led by Chaudhary Devi Lal contributed Rs. 10 million for this purpose. The government later issued a notification to acquire land for the SYL canal. The construction of the Haryana portion of the canal was completed by June 1980.

After the Indian National Congress came to power in Punjab in 1980, an agreement was reached between Punjab, Haryana and Rajasthan, which were all under Congress rule, with Darbara Singh being the chief minister of Punjab and Indira Gandhi being the prime minister of India. Under the agreement, Punjab's share was increased to 5.21 billion m^{3} and that of Rajasthan to 10.6 billion m^{3} while the share of Haryana from the revised 21.18 billion m^{3} of water remained the same. All states withdrew their suits from the Supreme Court following the signing of agreement. On 8 April 1982, Indira Gandhi formally launched the construction of the canal at Kapoori village of Punjab in 1982. On 23 April, the Punjab government issued a white paper hailing the agreement. According to the terms reached under Punjab accord, a tribunal was to be set up to investigate the river water claims of Haryana, Punjab and Rajasthan. The Akali Dal came back to power in Punjab on 29 September 1985 and on 5 November 1985, the newly elected Punjab Legislative Assembly repudiated the 1981 agreement. The Ravi and Beas Waters Tribunal (also known as Eradi Tribunal after its chair V. Balakrishna Eradi) was constituted on 2 April 1986. On 30 January 1987, the tribunal upheld the legality of the agreements of 1955, 1976 and 1981. It also increased shares of both Punjab and Haryana, allocating them 6.2 billion m^{3} and 4.72 billion m^{3} respectively. It also noted that while the canal's portion had been completed in Haryana, the portion in Punjab wasn't and urged that it be completed expeditiously. The Akali Dal government in Punjab under Surjit Singh Barnala started the construction of the canal. However, it kept dithering on its completion.

The construction was stopped in July 1990 after a chief engineer associated with its construction was shot dead by Khalistani militants. The canal remained incomplete due to the dispute over the issue. In 1999, Haryana filed a suit in the Supreme Court seeking construction of the canal. In 2002, the Supreme Court directed Punjab to complete the SYL canal within a year. Punjab refused to do so and petitioned for a review of the court order which was rejected. In 2004, the Supreme Court directed the Union government to get the canal completed through a central agency. The Central Public Works Department was appointed on 2 July 2004 to take over the canal work from Punjab government. However, on 12 July 2004, the Punjab Legislative Assembly passed the Punjab Termination of Agreements Act, 2004 which abrogated all its river water agreements with neighbouring states. The President of India then referred this bill to the Supreme Court in the same year.

The Supreme Court began hearings on the bill by the Punjab Assembly on 7 March 2016. On 15 March 2016, the Punjab Legislative Assembly unanimously passed the Punjab Satluj Yamuna Link Canal Land (Transfer of Proprietary Rights) Bill, 2016, proposing to return the land that had been taken from owners for building the SYL canal. On 18 March, the Supreme Court ordered the Punjab government to maintain status quo on the land meant for construction of the canal. On 10 November, the court gave its opinion that Punjab government's 2004 bill which terminated river water agreements was illegal. On 15 November, the government passed an executive order, denotifying the land meant for the digging of the canal and returned it to its original owners through notification issued by Punjab's financial commissioner of revenue K.B.S. Sidhu, utilising revenue powers that rests with an IAS officer. Punjab's Legislative Assembly also passed a resolution on the next day, demanding royalties for river water supplied to its non-riparian neighbors Haryana, Rajasthan and Delhi. All of the denotified land was returned by 20 November. A status quo was however again ordered by the Supreme Court relating to the land on 30 November.

On 22 February 2017, the Supreme Court stated that the Government of Punjab will have to abide by its order on construction of SYL canal and it will pass a decree if the governments of Punjab and Haryana failed to come to an agreement. Captain Abhimanyu, the Finance Minister of Haryana, while presenting Government of Haryana's 2017-18 budget in March 2017 announced that ₹100 crore had been allocated for completion of the construction of the canal, the first time any money had been specifically set aside for it in the state government's budget.

== Status ==
The canal is 85% complete with Haryana government completing its part of the canal. It has completed 92 km of the canal on its land. Haryana would benefit enormously by gaining water from Ravi-Beas from Punjab. On 30 November 2016, the Supreme Court appointed the Union Home Secretary, Punjab's Chief Secretary and the Director General of Police as receivers for submitting a report on the present status of land and other properties on the canal site by 15 December. The receivers submitted their reports as per schedule, stating in the reports that there was no fresh or deliberate damage to the canal.

To augment nearly 100 tmcft water availability in Sutlej basin for the needs of this link canal, Lingdi Nadi (a tributary of Tso Moriri lake) waters can be diverted to the Sutlej basin by digging a 9 km long gravity canal to connect to the Pare Chu and Ungti Chu rivers. Ungti Chu and Pare Chu rivers are tributaries of Sutlej river with its drainage area located in Ladakh. Thus water need not be spared by Punjab state for the needs of this canal. Hydropower generation from the projects located on Sutlej River would also increase by the augmented water flows from Tso Moriri lake's catchment area.

== Protests ==
The Akali protest over the SYL issue on 12 April 2016 in Ludhiana, whilst accusing national convenor of Aam Aadmi Party and Chief Minister of Delhi Arvind Kejriwal and his government of "double-speak" and "anti-Punjab stand". On 11 November 2016, all Indian National Congress MLAs of the Punjab Legislative Assembly resigned in protest at the Supreme Court's decision that the state's termination of the link canal was unconstitutional. Aam Aadmi Party began an indefinite protest on the same day at Kapoori village, blaming both the Shiromani Akali Dal and Congress for SYL. Apprehending law and order problem over the issue, the Punjab Police deployed the Rapid Action Force in parts of Punjab, sealed the border with Haryana and increased patrolling on the National Highway-1 on 12 November. A Congress rally was organised on 13 November at Khuian Sarwar village. President of Punjab Pradesh Congress Committee Amarinder Singh declared that not a single drop a water will go out of Punjab while also announcing that a Congress delegation including MPs and MLAs would meet President of India Pranab Mukherjee on the issue. The delegation met the President on 17 November, urging him to form a panel to look into the SYL issue and direct the Union government to consider ground realities and water availability in the state before taking any action on advice of the Supreme Court. Amarinder resigned from Lok Sabha on 23 November in protest against the issue. A delegation of Punjab government's ministers met the President on 28 November, urging him not to accept any advice against the riparian water rights. The Akali Dal held a rally at Moga on 8 December regarding the issue. Chief Minister Prakash Singh Badal stated that the controversy had been resolved after giving back the land meant for the canal to the original owners. He also stated that Punjab didn't have a single drop of water to spare.

In January 2017, the Indian National Lok Dal (INLD) announced that it will dig the canal itself on 23 February. In response, Punjab's government heightened security along the Punjab-Haryana border. On 23 February, INLD along with its supporters entered Punjab to start the digging of the canal. More than 70 of its leaders were arrested by the Punjab Police for violating prohibitory orders. Haryana claims that it is riparian state of Sutlej river as the upper reaches of Sirsa Nadi which is a tributary of Sutlej river is draining north western area of Haryana state. Rajasthan claims that it is also riparian state of Sutlej river as its northern area is part of the river basin. Irrigation experts believe that Rajasthan will lose significant chunk of its share as the Feeder canals from Harike Pattan will lose water volume due to SYL.

== Other alternatives projects ==
=== Sharda-Yamuna Link (SYL) Canal ===
The Haryana government remains silent on the proposed Sharda-Yamuna Link (SYL) Canal, for which a National Perspective Plan (NPP) was formulated by the Union Ministry of Water Resources Development in 1980. This plan considered large-scale inter-basin water transfer proposals to move water from surplus regions to deficit regions. Additionally, this canal is expected to address the significant flood problems in Uttarakhand.

Punjab has no surplus water to provide to Haryana; instead, it should be sourced from the Sharda-Yamuna Link Canal, stated AAP leader H. S. Phoolka.

== Popular culture ==
Shubhdeep Singh Sidhu, popularly known as Sidhu Moose Wala, released a song titled SYL about the project.

Masoom Sharma also released a song titled SYL Haryanvi.

== See also ==
- Indian Rivers Inter-link
- Kaushalya Dam in Pinjore
- Bhakra Dam
- Hathni Kund Barrage
- Tajewala Barrage
- Okhla Barrage - Western Yamuna Canal begins here
- Indira Gandhi Canal
- Irrigation in India
- Inland waterways of India
- Ganges Canal
- Ganges Canal (Rajasthan)
- Upper Ganges Canal Expressway
- SYL (song)
