= Harchand Singh Longowal =

Indian politician (1932–1985)

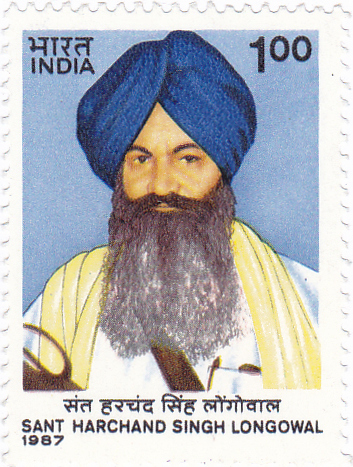
- Harchand Singh Longowal on an India Post stamp issued by the Government of India
- Born: 2 January 1932; Gidariani, Patiala State, British India
- Died: 20 August 1985 (aged 53); Sherpur, Punjab, India
- Occupation: President of the Shiromani Akali Dal

Harchand Singh Longowal (2 January 1932 – 20 August 1985) was the President of the Akali Dal political party during the Punjab insurgency of the 1980s. He had signed the Punjab accord, also known as the Rajiv-Longowal Accord with Rajiv Gandhi on 24 July 1985. The government accepted most of the Akali Dal demands, who in turn agreed to withdraw their activism. Less than a month after signing the accord, Longowal was assassinated by the Sikh militants opposed to the accord.

== Early years ==
Harchand Singh Longowal was born on 2 January 1932, in a Sikh family of modest means living in Gidariani, a village then in the princely state of Patiala, but now a part of the Sangrur district of Punjab, India. Under the tutelage of Sant Jodh Singh at the seminary in nearby Maujo, he studied Sikh theology and Sikh texts and practised Sikh music. As his teacher was also a member of the Akali movement, it is likely that young Harchand Singh ji also imbibed the spirit of political activism at that time.

Leaving Maujo at the age of twenty-one, Harchand Singh served as scripture-reader and custodian at the village gurdwara at Heron Kalan, moving the following year to Longowal, a small town 16 kilometres (10 miles) south-west of Sangrur. There, he raised a gurdwara in memory of Bhai Mani Singh, a celebrated eighteenth-century scholar and martyr. In 1962, Harchand Singh was named head of the important historical shrine at Damdama Sahib (Talwandi Sabo), but he took on the suffix "Longowal" which remained with him for the rest of his life. He was affectionately known as "Sant Ji"

== Beginnings of political activism ==
Longowal's life of political activism began in June 1964, when he led a demonstration for Sikh rights at the historic site of Paonta Sahib in the present-day state of Himachal Pradesh. In 1965, Longowal became the president of the Akali organization in Sangrur district and a member of the working committee of the Shiromani Akali Dal. In 1969, he was elected to the Punjab Legislative Assembly as the Akali candidate, defeating the Congress Party's Babu Brish Bhan, who had been chief minister of the Patiala and East Punjab States Union (PEPSU).

In June 1975, the Allahabad High Court annulled the election of Indira Gandhi, the then Prime Minister. Instead of resigning she imposed the Internal Emergency and arrested thousands of leaders of opposition parties. Although no Akali leader had been arrested, the organisation decided to take action against the suppression of civil liberties. In July 1975, all the senior Akali leaders courted arrest and Harchand Singh Longowal took over command of the protests which continued till January 1977. In the 1978 by-election to the Lok Sabha (Lower House), Harchand Singh was offered the Akali nomination for Faridkot constituency but he declined the offer. He got Balwant Singh Ramoowalia to contest instead, who was elected to the seat.

== 1980s: Civil disobedience ==
In 1980, Longowal was recalled to preside over the Akali party. In this role, he organized large-scale campaigns of civil disobedience to win concessions from India's Central Government on the longstanding grievances of Punjab, and especially the Sikhs of Punjab. Longowal led the Akali side in years of frustrating negotiations with Indira Gandhi, talks that served to undermine public faith in the course of peaceful dialogue with the government. This, in turn strengthened the hand of extremists and separatists. In December 1983 Longowal invited sikh fundamentalist Jarnail Singh Bhindranwale to take up residence in the Golden Temple Complex at the Guru Nanak Niwas and later on in an adjacent building next to Akal Takht. He called the tough-minded Bhindranwale "our stave to beat the government."

The peaceful campaign to achieve justice from the central Indian government began on 4 August 1982 under the leadership of Harchand Singh Longowal and six other members of a designated high command, namely Parkash Singh Badal—former Chief Minister of Punjab, Gurcharan Singh Tohra—President of the Shiromani Gurdwara Parbandhak Committee, Jagdev Singh Talwandi, Surjit Singh Barnala—former Union Agriculture Minister, Sukhjinder Singh—former Punjab Minister, and Ravi Inder Singh—former Speaker of the Punjab Legislature. All in all, it endured some twenty-two months and saw the arrest of more than 200,000 demonstrators in Amritsar. The overall campaign was marked by several individual demonstrations. One of the earliest had an unexpected outcome. When Longowal declared that Sikhs would demonstrate against the Central Government's injustices at the opening of the 1982 Asian Games on 19 November 1982 in Delhi, the Prime Minister called on the Chief Minister of Haryana to prevent Sikhs traveling by road or rail from neighbouring Punjab to Delhi. The Haryana police did this and in the process caused inconvenience to the civilians and army officers coming to the games. Harbans Singh, On 4 January 1983 there was a mass stoppage of traffic on the major highways. On 17 June 1983 rail traffic was halted by large-scale protests. A statewide work stoppage was held on 29 August 1983. On 26 January 1984, article 25(a) of the Indian constitution, indicating Sikhs are Hindus, was publicly burned.

Finally, Longowal announced that as of 3 June 1984 they would practice civil disobedience by refusing to pay land revenue, water and electricity bills, and block the flow of grain out of Punjab. The Sikh coalition in opposition to the Central Government held together until September 1983, when the increasing frustrations of negotiating with the Prime Minister began to take its toll in a growing division between Jarnail Singh Bhindranwale, Jagdev Singh Talwandi and Harchand Singh Longowal.

== Falling out with Bhindranwale ==
On 14 April 1984, Surinder Singh Sodhi was shot and killed while drinking milk in a shop in Amritsar by Surinder Singh Shinda and Baljit Kaur. Baljit Kaur had attempted to assassinate Jarnail Singh Bhindranwale on 13 April, but backed out. Kaur went to the Golden Temple after the killing and confessed to the murder. Kaur would be interrogated by Bhindranwale. She would allegedly admit to the other killer being her boyfriend Shinda and to being paid 200,000 rupees (3.1 million rupees in 2023, US$37,500 in 2023) by Gurcharan Singh, the general secretary of Akali Dal led by Harchand Singh Longowal, to do the killing. She also implicated others. In a speech Bhindranwale said, "They (Akali Dal) killed our young men. They severed my right arm... I know what role that lion, that son of his mother played in seeking vengeance for the martyrs". Bhindranwale stressed that if Sodhi had lived 15 more days, Bhajan Lal would be dead.

Bhindranwale vowed revenge and to punish those responsible in 48 hours. Many responsible were killed within the time frame. Malik Bhaita, the Akali Dal head of Amritsar, confessed to his role in arranging the taxi for Shinda’s escape. He was momentarily forgiven by Bhindranwale but while leaving the Golden Temple Complex, Bhaita would be slashed with swords by Bhindranwale's followers. Bhaita attempted to flee to Longowal, but would be killed with a bullet. He put a signboard up in view of Longowal's office saying, "Sodhi's murder avenged within 48 hours. The other conspirators should look after themselves now." Longowal feared that he would be killed next and managed to have Babbar Khalsa side with him and provide security. 130 Akali leaders and 40 SGPC members revolted against Longowal and sided with Bhindranwale. With this, Akali Dal, under Longowal was divided against Bhindranwale.

== Operation Blue Star ==
During Operation Blue Star in 1984 the Indian army killed militants (and civilians) hiding inside the Golden temple complex. The army operation happened between 1–6 June 1984. During that time, Longowal was arrested by the army

== Punjab Accord ==
Finally, in March 1985, the leadership of the Akali party began to be released from prison by order of the new prime minister Rajiv Gandhi. With a view to improving the situation and creating conditions for a negotiated settlement of Sikh demands, the prime minister's confidante, Arjun Singh, who was posted as the Governor of the state, relaxed censorship of the Punjabi press, withdrew army control over certain districts, announced his willingness to institute a judicial enquiry into the November 1984 killings, lifted the ban on the All India Sikh Students Federation and agreed to review the cases of thousands of Sikhs imprisoned since the army's arrival in Punjab the previous June. Within a few days, the first 53 were released. A few days later, Rajiv made an effort to address the economic woes of Punjab, with its diminishing acreages and burgeoning unemployment by announcing the establishment of a rail coach factory at Kapurthala, Punjab which would need about 20,000 people. Then, after weeks of secret negotiations, Longowal met the Prime Minister in Delhi and on 23 July 1985 signed an eleven-point memorandum covering all the major issues which had defied resolution since the Akalis had first presented their list of demands. The accord attracted opposition from several orthodox Sikh leaders of Punjab as well as from the politicians of Haryana. Some of its promises could not be fulfilled due to the disagreements.

== Death ==
Less than a month after signing the Punjab accord, Longowal was assassinated by Sikhs opposed to the accord. Longowal was shot and killed on 20 August 1985 near the gurdwara in Sherpur village, 90 km from Patiala in Punjab. Assassins Gyan Singh Leel and Jarnail Singh Halvara shot Longowal at point-blank range. The bullets hit his abdomen causing his death. His cremation took place on 21 August.

== Electoral Performance ==
Punjab Assembly election, 1969: Lehra
Party	Candidate	Votes	%	±%
SAD	Harchand Singh Longowal	27,397		
INC	Brish Bhan	18,656		

Punjab Assembly by-election, 1970: Lehra
Party	Candidate	Votes	%	±%
SAD	Harchand Singh Longowal	28,755		
INC	Brish Bhan	4,735		

== See also ==
- 1984 Anti Sikh Riots

== Cited sources ==
- Khushwant Singh (2004) A History of the Sikhs, Volume II: 1839–2004, New Delhi; Oxford University Press. p. 355. ISBN 0195673093
