= Sarhali =

Sarhali (Punjabi: ਸਰਹਾਲੀ) may refer to:

- Sarhali, Jalandhar
- Sarhali, Tarn Taran
