= Sarhali, Jalandhar =

Sarhali
- town
- Location in Punjab, India Sarhali (India)
- Coordinates: 31.1797442°N 75.6744504°E
- Country: India
- State: Punjab
- District: Jalandhar

Government
  - Type: Panchayat raj
  - Body: nagar panchayat
- Elevation: 240 m (790 ft)

Population (2011)
  - Total: 3,083
- Sex ratio 1565/1518 ♂/♀

Languages
  - Official: Punjabi
- Time zone: UTC+5:30 (IST)
- PIN: 144633
- ISO 3166 code: IN-PB
- Vehicle registration: PB- 08
- Website: jalandhar.nic.in

Sarhali is a census town in Jalandhar district of Punjab State, India. It is located 6.7 km from phagwara, 11 km from Phillaur, 24.8 km from district headquarter Jalandhar and 139 km from state capital Chandigarh. The town is administrated by a sarpanch who is an elected representative of town as per Panchayati raj (India).

== Transport ==
Phagwara railway station is the nearest train station; however, Phillaur Junction train station is 25 km away from the sarhali. The sarhali is 63 km away from domestic airport in Ludhiana and the nearest international airport is located in Chandigarh also Sri Guru Ram Dass Jee International Airport is the second nearest airport which is 123 km away in Amritsar And there also bus service on nakodar road this make people of Sarhali easy transport
