= Sikh architecture =

Style of architecture

Sikh architecture ਸਿੱਖ ਸਥਾਪਤਕ ਕਲਾ Sikh monuments and shrines
- Cultural and religious architectural style
- Sikh Architectural Heritage
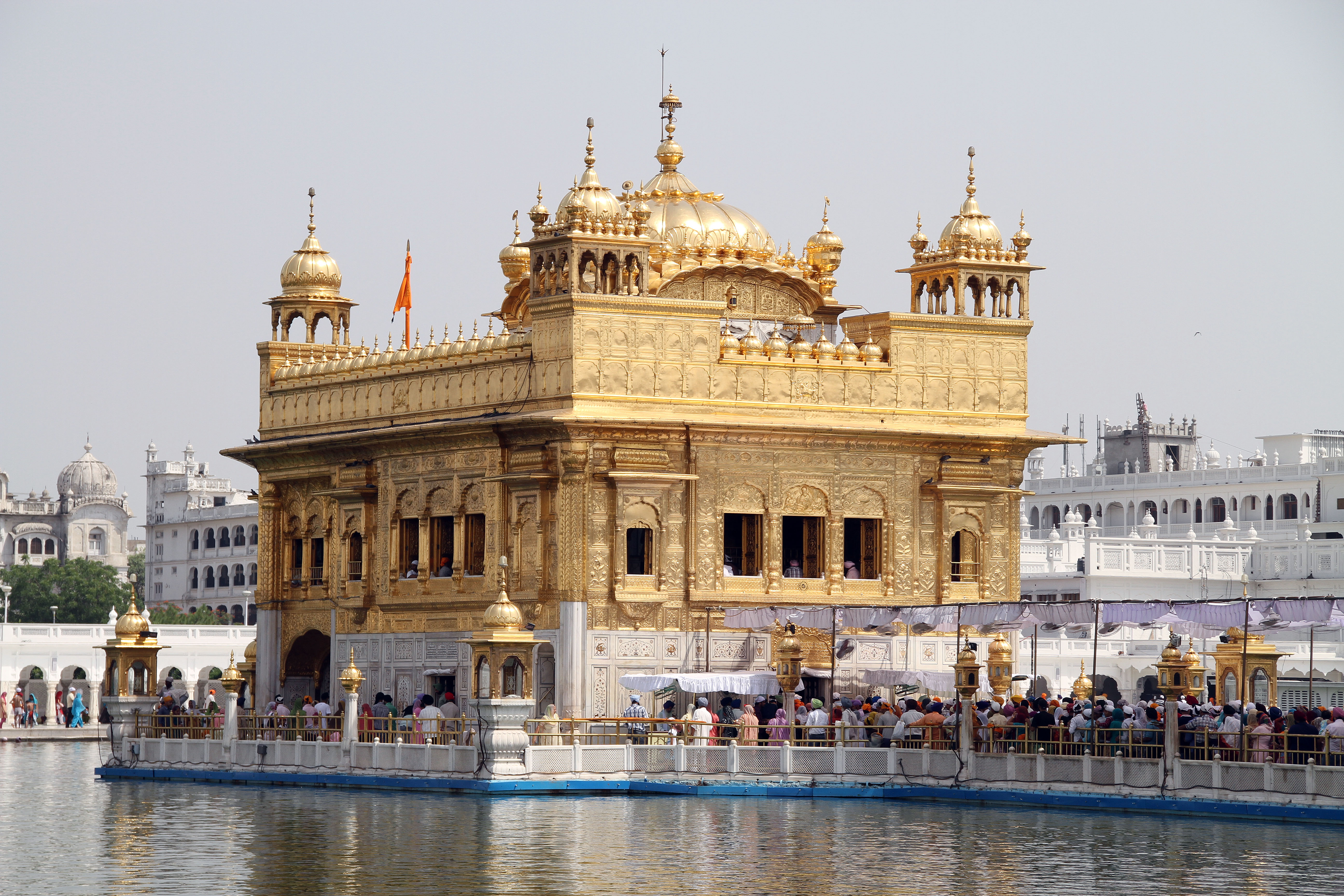
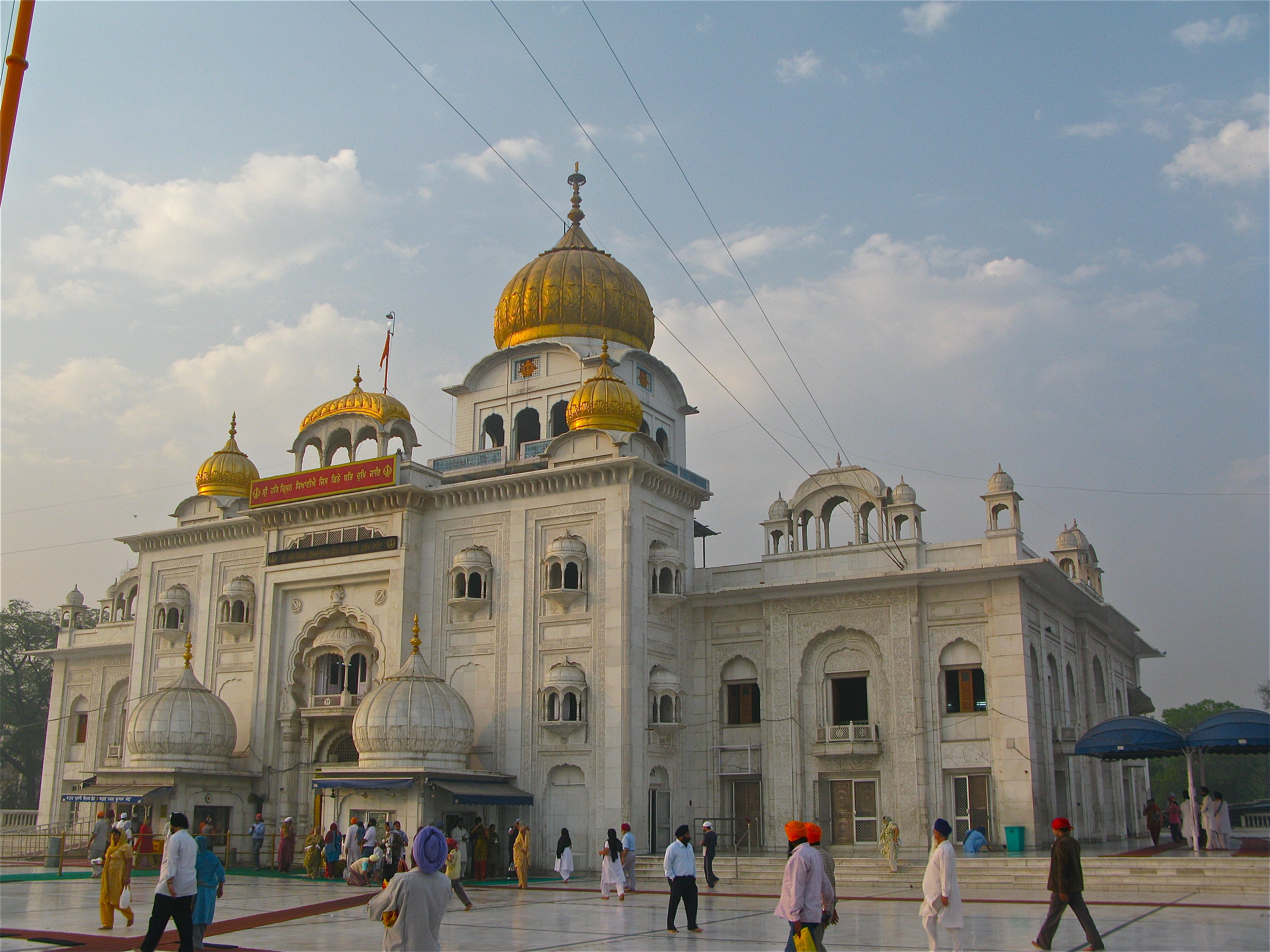
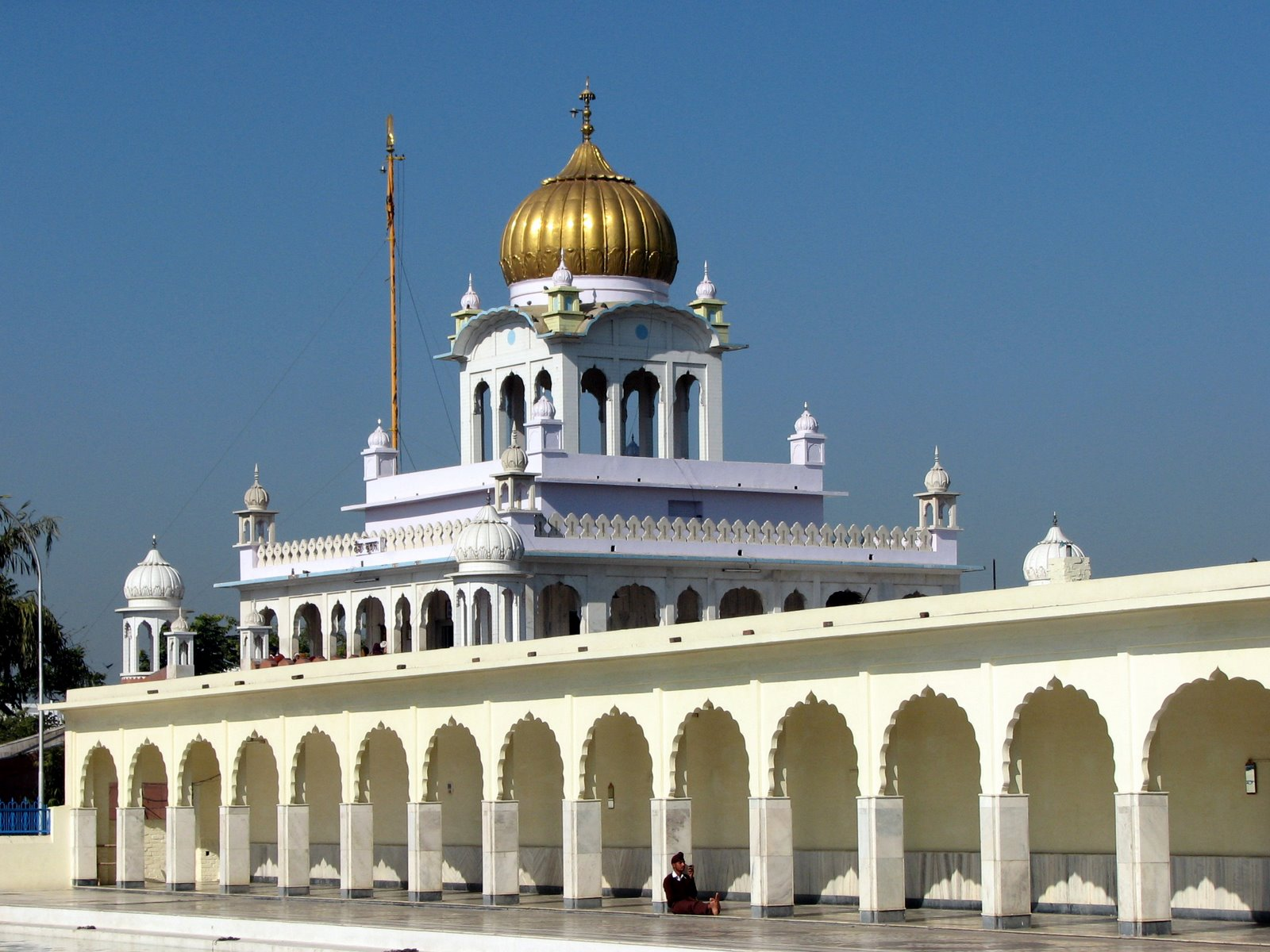
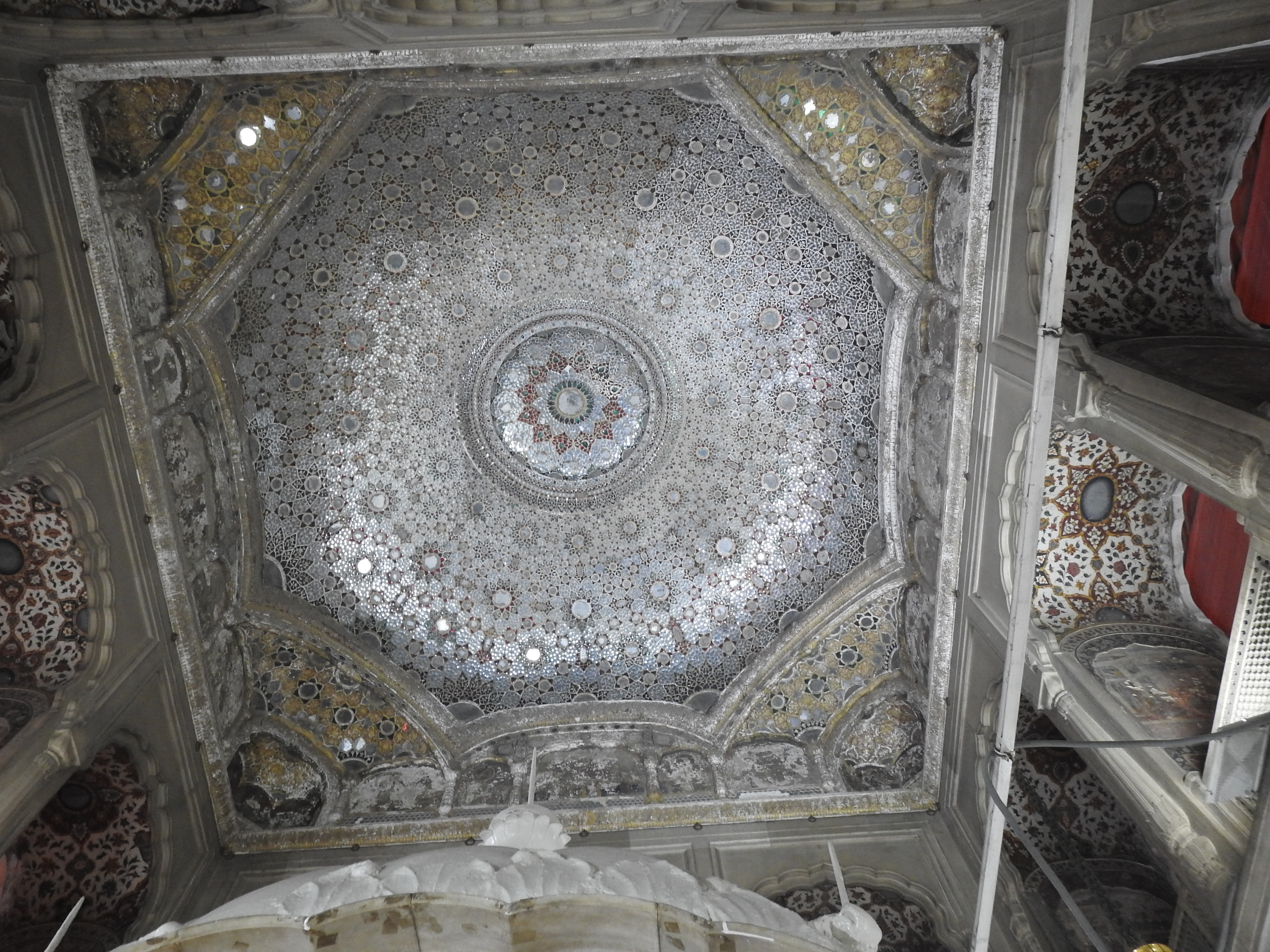
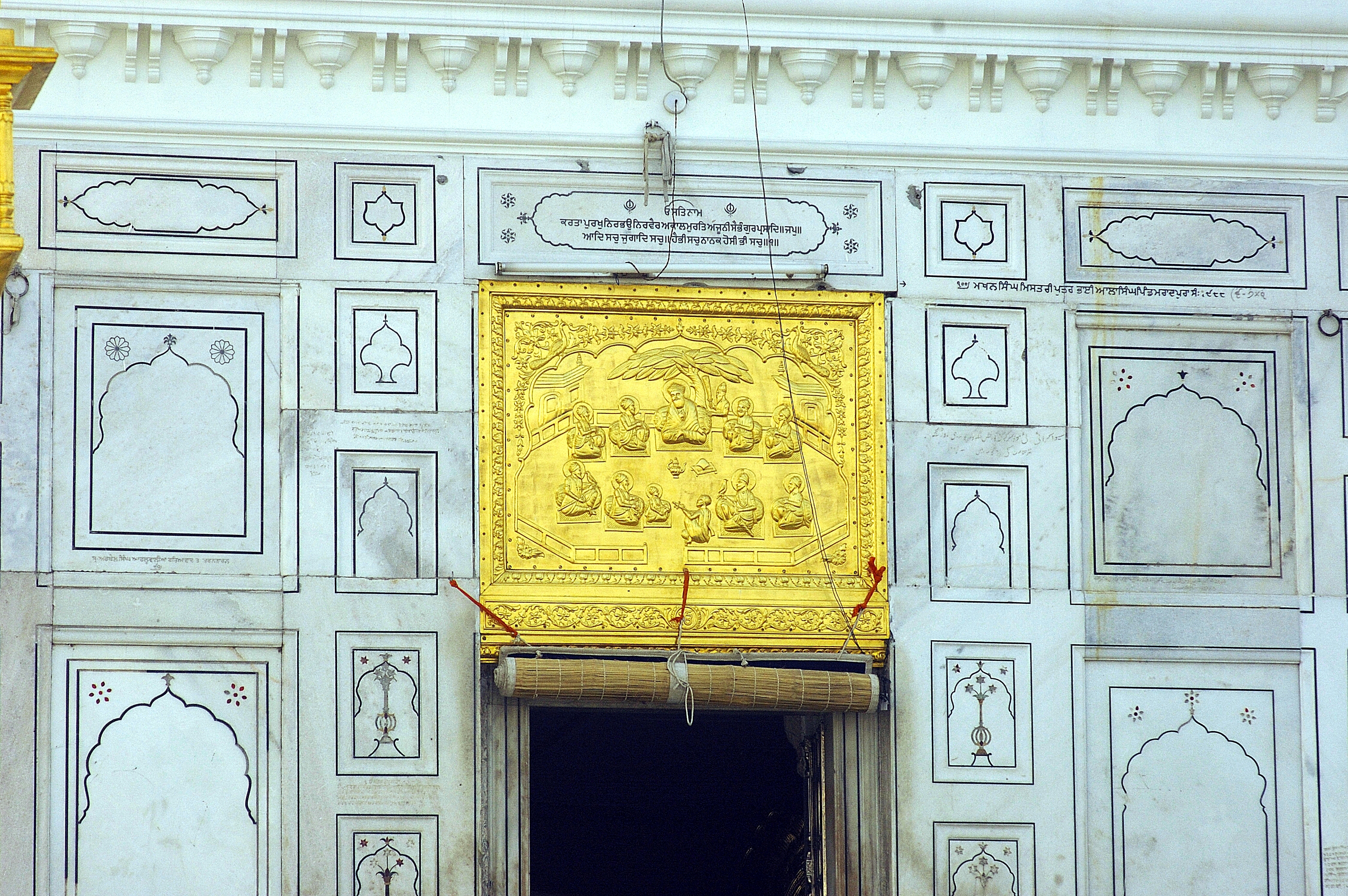
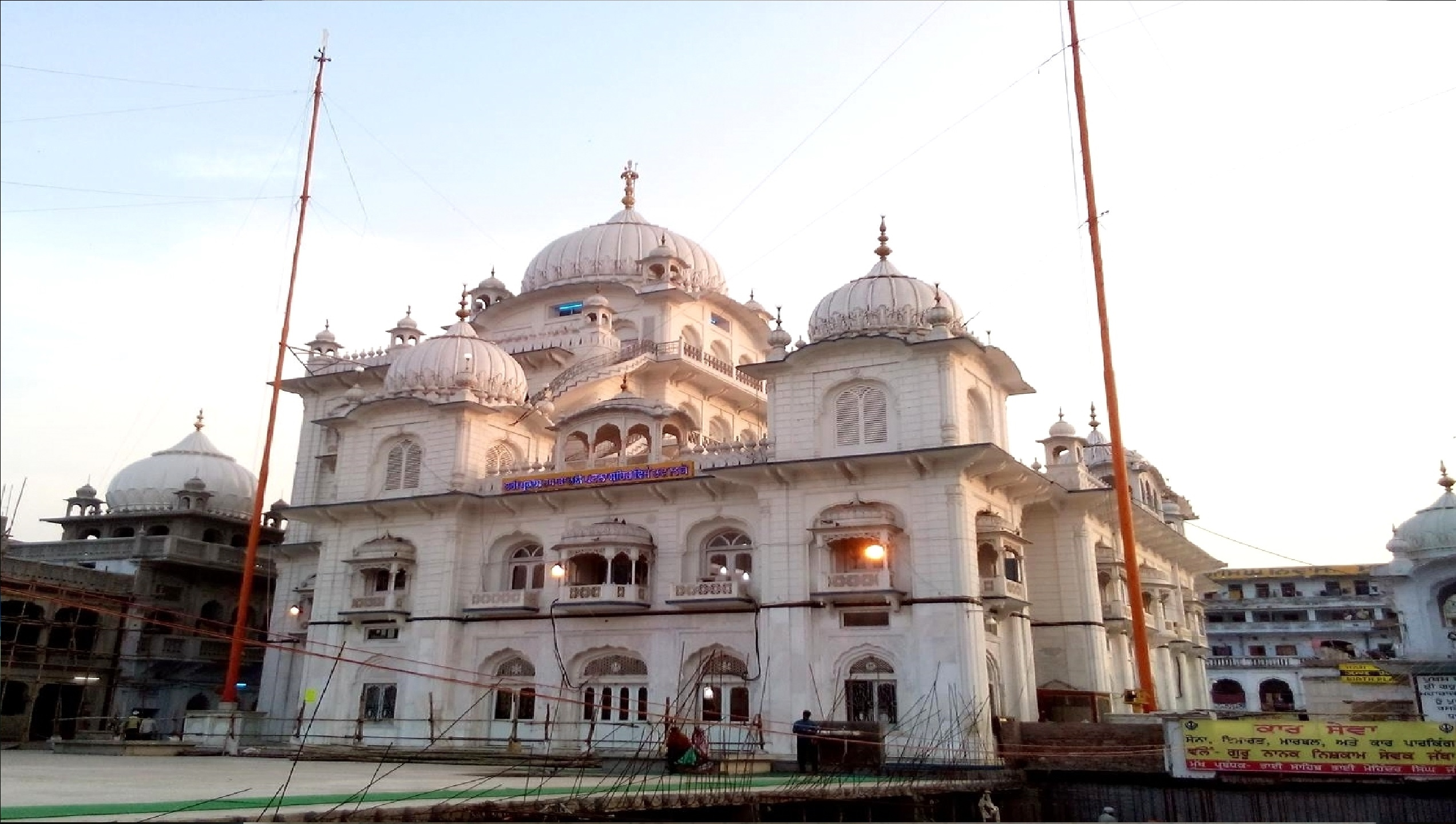
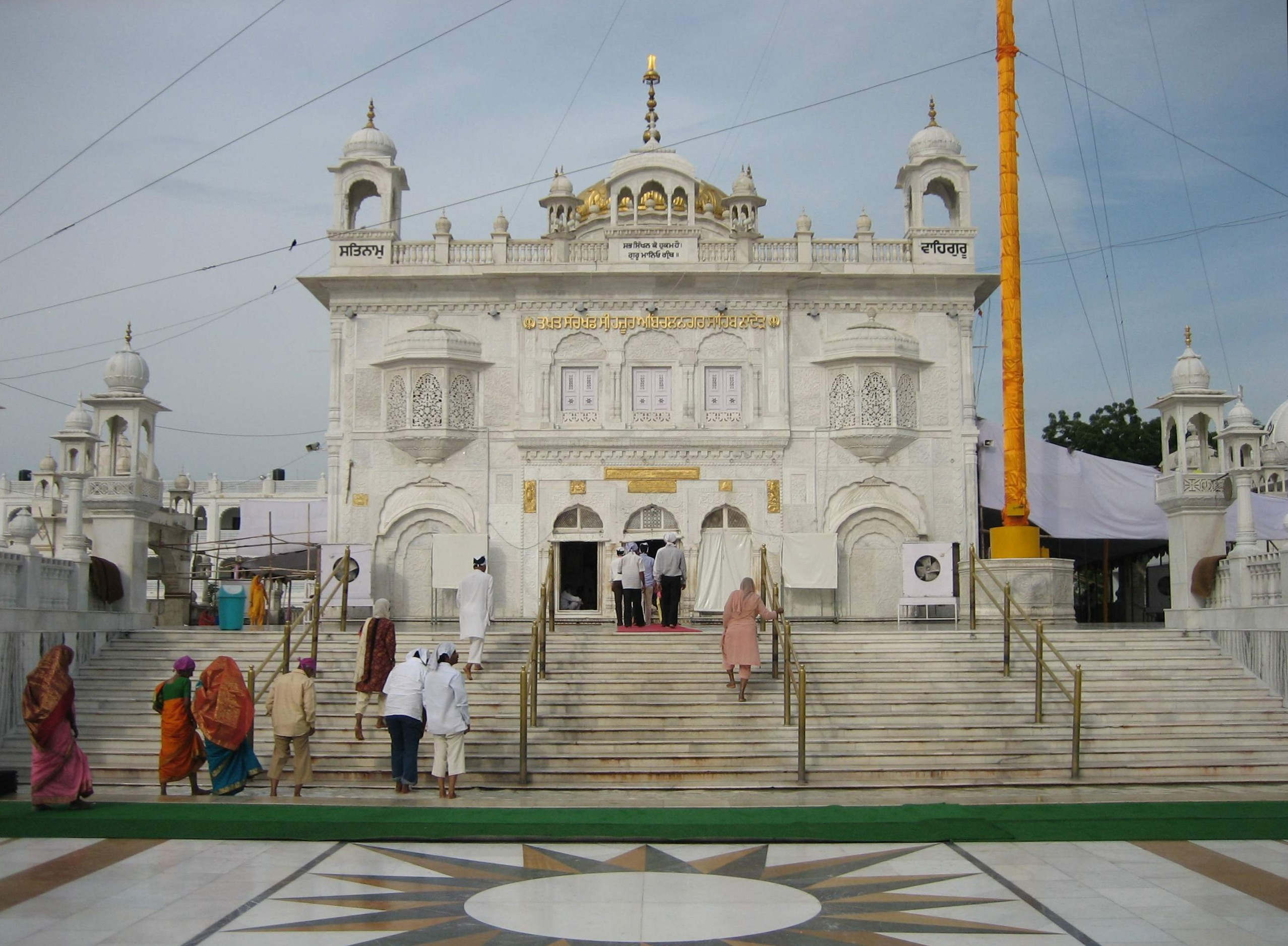
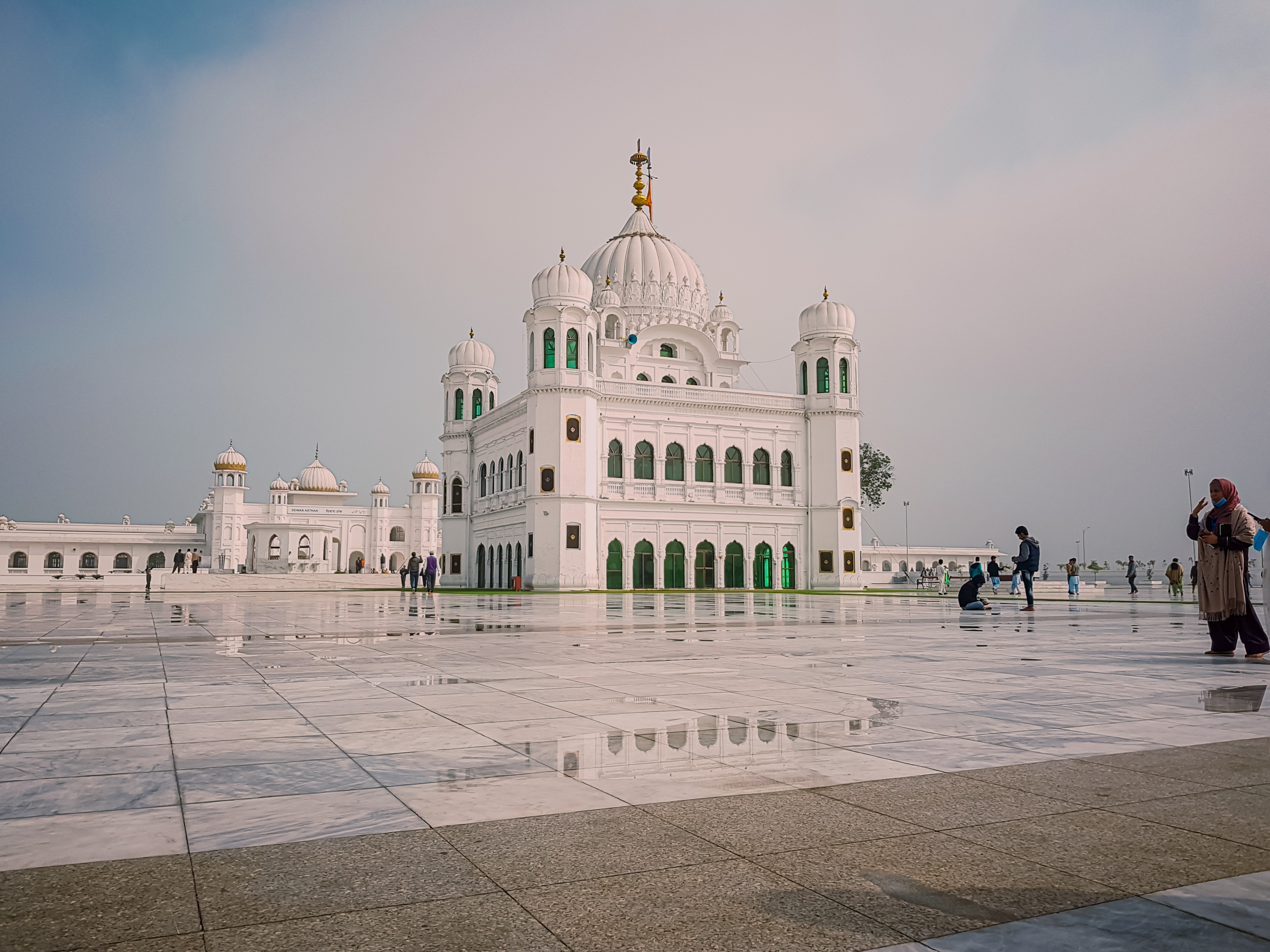
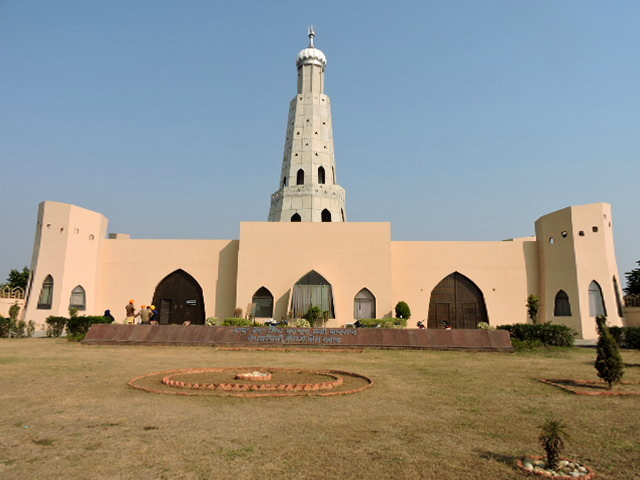
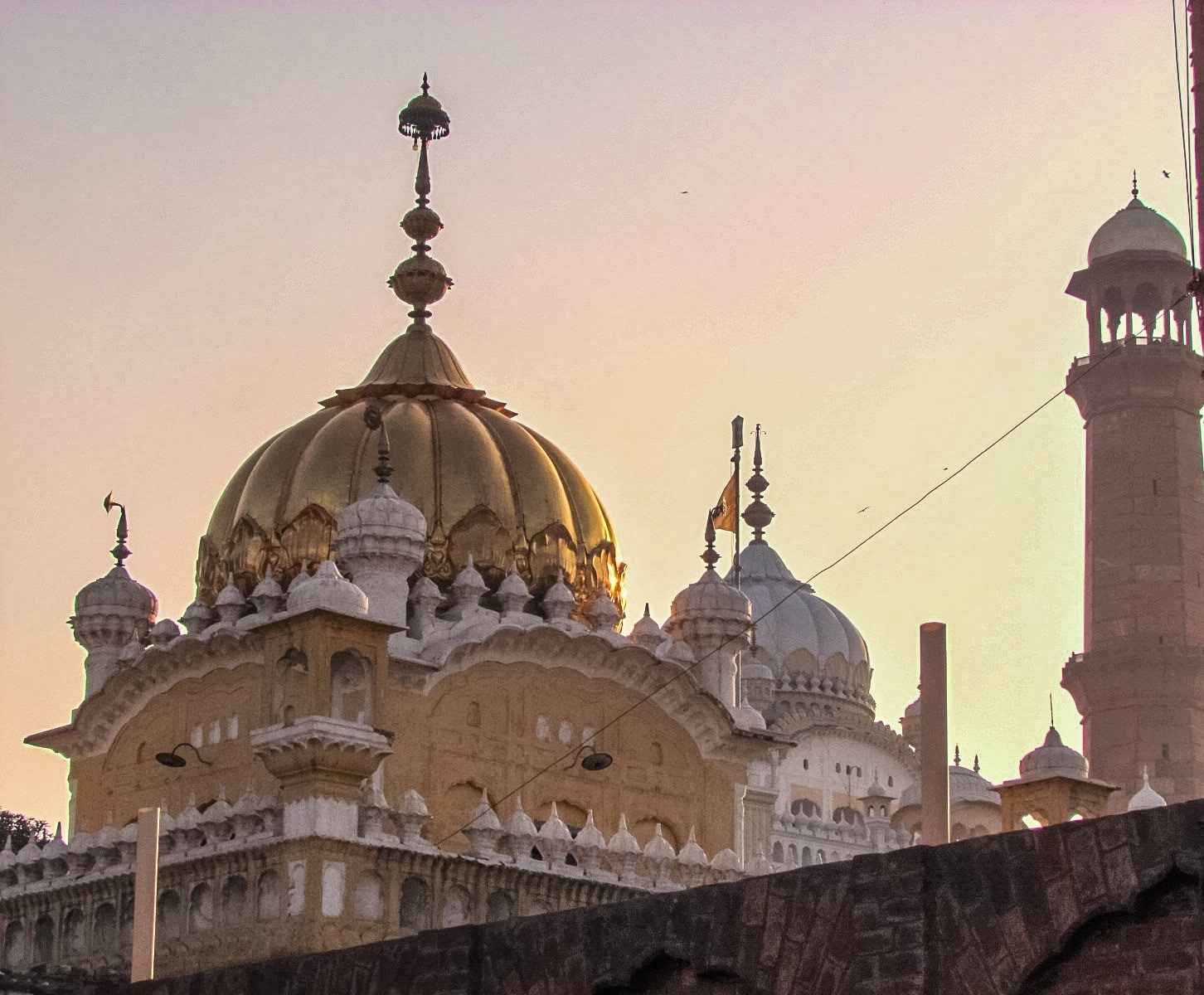
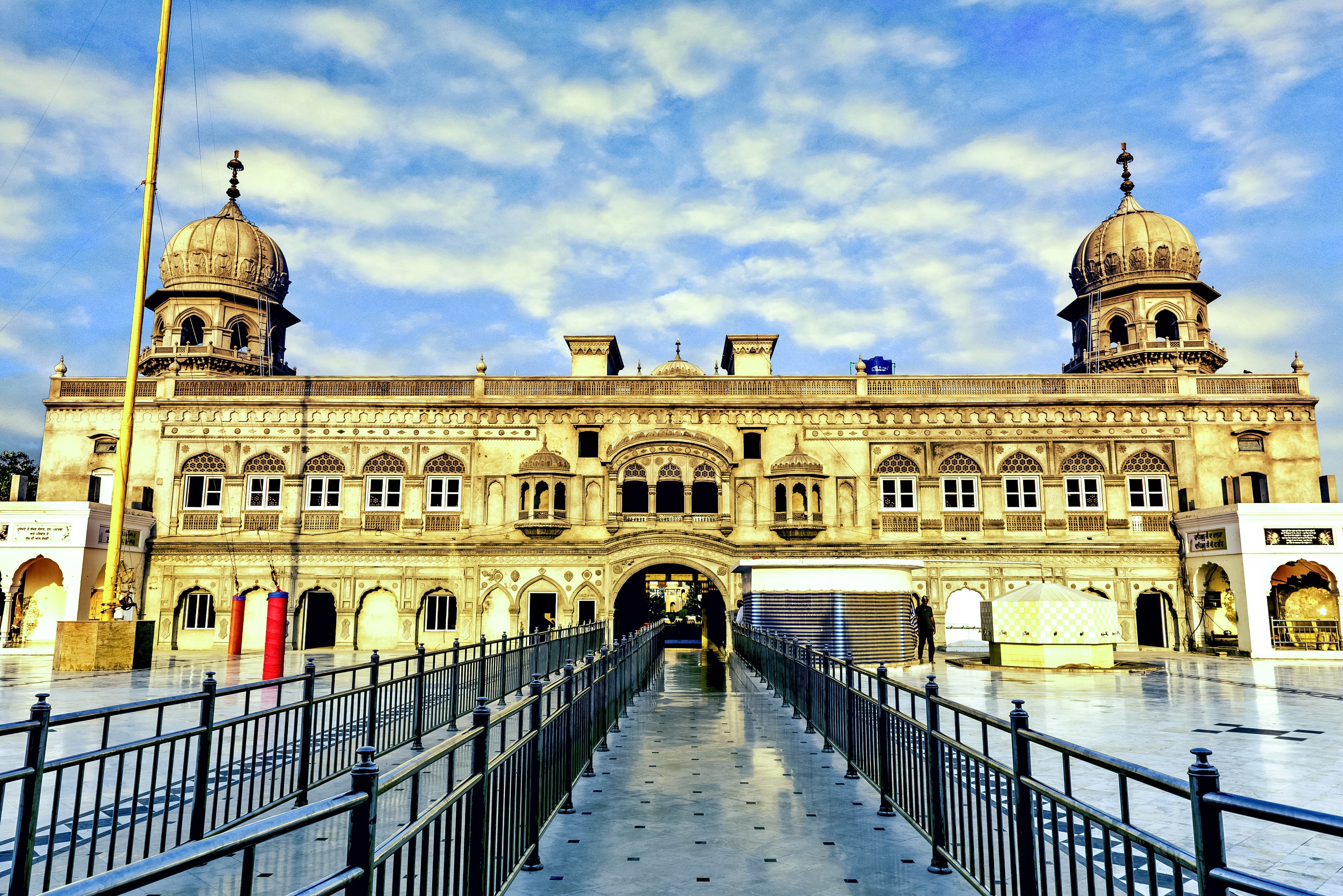
- From top, left to right: Harmandir Sahib (Golden Temple), Amritsar; Gurudwara Bangla Sahib, Delhi; Fatehgarh Sahib Sarovar; Interior of Samadhi of Ranjit Singh, Lahore; Tarn Taran Sahib; Takht Sri Patna Sahib, Bihar; Hazur Sahib, Nanded; Kartarpur Sahib, Pakistan; Fateh Burj; Gurdwara Dera Sahib, Lahore; Gurdwara Janam Asthan, Nankana Sahib

Sikh architecture is a distinctive style of architecture that developed under the Sikh Confederacy and later flourished during the Sikh Empire in the 18th and 19th centuries, primarily in the Punjab region. Due to its progressive nature, Sikh architecture has continued to evolve over time, giving rise to several new branches and influencing various contemporary architectural styles. Although Sikh architecture was originally developed as part of the religious and cultural expression within Sikhism, its aesthetic richness and symbolic elements have led to its adoption in many secular and non-religious buildings as well, admired for their beauty and structural harmony. 300 years ago, Sikh architecture was distinguished for its many curves and straight lines; Keshgarh Sahib and the Harmandir Sahib (Golden Temple) are prime examples of traditional Sikh architecture.

== History ==
=== Background ===
The manifestation of Sikh architecture is sourced to the religion itself and relevant tenets and principles influencing the religious spaces associated with the community. Studying historical Sikh architecture is rendered difficult due to how little of it dating to the gurus' period remains extant presently. In Punjab, architecture traditionally was constructed using small and thin brick (made from local-earth and low-fired in wood-burning kilns to be fully baked) rather than stone. Binding of the bricks to one another tended to be done by mud-mortar as lime-mortar was a luxury that had to be brought from Rajasthan, usually used for mud-mortared joints. More expensive mud-mortar structures had lime plaster and were decorated with murals. Only the most expensive building projects used lime-mortar throughout the structure. Due to the usage of mud-mortar, most historical Sikh structures did not survive the passage of time and due to the fact that the Punjab was subject to a series of invasions, destroying much of its architecture as a result. During Sikh-rule, such as in the 19th century, many original sites were rebuilt and renovated by Sikh rulers, destroying the original guru-era structures but building grander sites in their place. The destruction of historical Sikh architecture and edifices under the guise of renovation continued into the 20th and 21st centuries, especially at the most pivotal sites. Neglected sites (such as the Thatte Khera tank complex) are more likely to have surviving Sikh historical architecture as a result and textual evidence can be consulted to form an understanding of the historical evolution of Sikh architecture.

Sikh architecture was influenced by Mughal and Rajput architecture. However, differences between Sikh architecture and the others exist in regards to embellishment and emphasis, expanse and shrinkage, and detail and refinement.Sikh architecture was heavily influenced by elements of Mughal and Islamic styles. Features such as the onion dome, frescoes, inlay work, and multi-foil arches are derived from the Mughal period, particularly during the reign of Shah Jahan. In contrast, features like chattris, oriel windows, bracket-supported eaves at the string-course, and decorative friezes reflect the influence of Rajput architecture.

=== Sikh gurus ===
Since the era of Guru Nanak, congregations of Sikhs constructed modest halls (Dharamsals) for religious functions. The dharamsals were simple constructions that housed a gathering space for the local community (sangat) to listen to the guru's discourses, to meet others, eat together (langar), and to sing hymns. Later gurus had baolis (stepwells, notably the one in Goindwal built by Guru Amar Das) and sarovars (tanks or pools, notably by Guru Ram Das and Guru Arjan) constructed along trade-routes to spread the growing religion and to practice isnaan (bathing). Dharamsals were succeeded by gurdwaras that housed the community's sacred scripture compiled by Guru Arjan, the most notable of which is the Darbar Sahib in Amritsar. Mud-houses were constructed surrounding the Darbar Sahib in Amritsar.

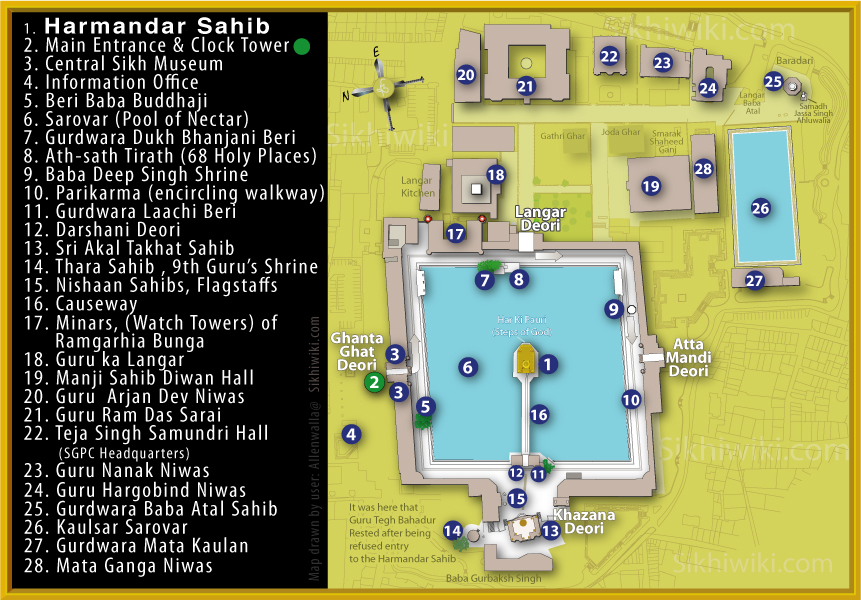
Map of the Harmandir Sahib Complex, Click to enlarge

Guru Arjan constructed a number of temple tanks. His father Guru Ram Das had constructed the tank of Amritsar (Amrit Sarovar) but it was Arjan's idea to construct a central shrine edifice at the site, designing the shrine's architecture himself, consisting of a causeway to the domed shrine placed in a natural depression (showcasing humility), which had four entry points. The project to build the Darbar Sahib shrine at Amritsar was a rallying point for the early Sikh community of the time. A mason was hired and brick-kilns were utilized for the project. However, the current gold and marble construction dates to the reign of Maharaja Ranjit Singh (renovated between 1802 and 1839) and may have little in common with the original edifice constructed under Guru Arjan, with the original building being blown up by invading Afghans in 1762.

=== Sikh rule ===
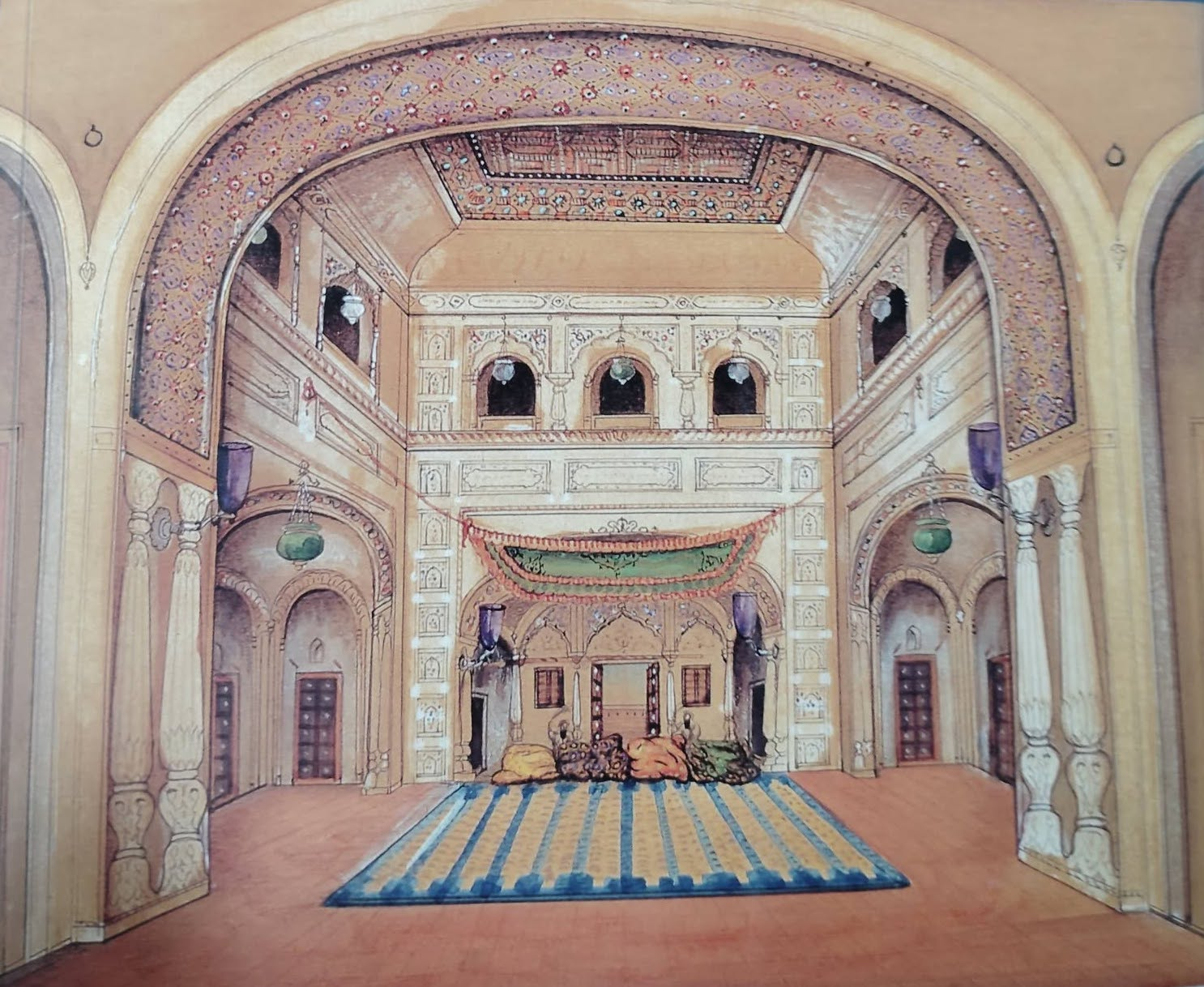
Painting of the interior of a Sikh temple (gurdwara), Punjab, c. 1875

During Sikh rule, a number of habitational and military structures (such as forts) were built. During the Durrani invasion of Punjab, the Darbar Sahib complex's shrine and surrounding mud-houses were destroyed. The Darbar Sahib was reconstructed under Jassa Singh Ahluwalia in 1765 after it was destroyed. The Darshani Deori of the site was built in 1776 and the parkarma in 1784. The site was renovated by being embellished with gold-plated copper-sheets and marble starting in 1803 under Maharaja Ranjit Singh, with decorative artwork. The misls of the Sikh Confederacy were active in architectural projects, such as the construction of bungas at principal Sikh sites, like at Amritsar's parikrama. Rather than rebuilding mud-houses to surround the Darbar Sahib, instead bungas were constructed as they offered more defensive advantages. Furthermore, they were used as residences by prominent Sikh chiefs and featured underground chambers. During the reign of Ranjit Singh, various gardens, havelis, gurdwaras, and śivalas (temples) were constructed. During the reign of Maharaja Karam Singh and his successors of Patiala, a unique Phulkian style of Sikh architecture developed, characterized by being influenced by Bengali roofs rather than onion-style domes. Some gurdwaras originally rebuilt in this Phulkian style include Gurdwara Qila Mubarak, Bathinda, Gurdwara Fatehgarh Sahib and Gurdwara Tilak Asthan (Garhi Sahib) in Chamkaur, and Gurdwara Sri Patshahi Nauvin Sahib Qila Bahadurgarh. However, most of these gurdwaras have since been rebuilt by Kar Seva renovators and lost their Phulkian appearance.

=== Colonial period ===
After the annexation of the Sikh Empire in 1849, many former Sikh government and royal structures were converted into colonial ones or demolished. An example of this is three, former Sikh palaces that were demolished in 1862 with a Gothic clock-tower being constructed in its place. Early British authors, such as Thomas Henry Thornton, wrote disparaging reports on Sikh architecture, which impacted its reception and these views continue to the present-day. After colonization, European styles of architecture was introduced, such as Classical and Victorian Gothic. Furthermore, the Indo-Saracenic style developed, being promoted by the British. All of these styles competed with indigenous architectural styles in the princely states. Maharaja Jagatjit Singh of Kapurthala, a Francophile who travelled to Europe, utilized Western architectural styles with French influences.

=== Present ===
Diasporic Sikh gurdwaras have been constructed in the United Kingdom and Canada with varying architectural influences.

== Description ==
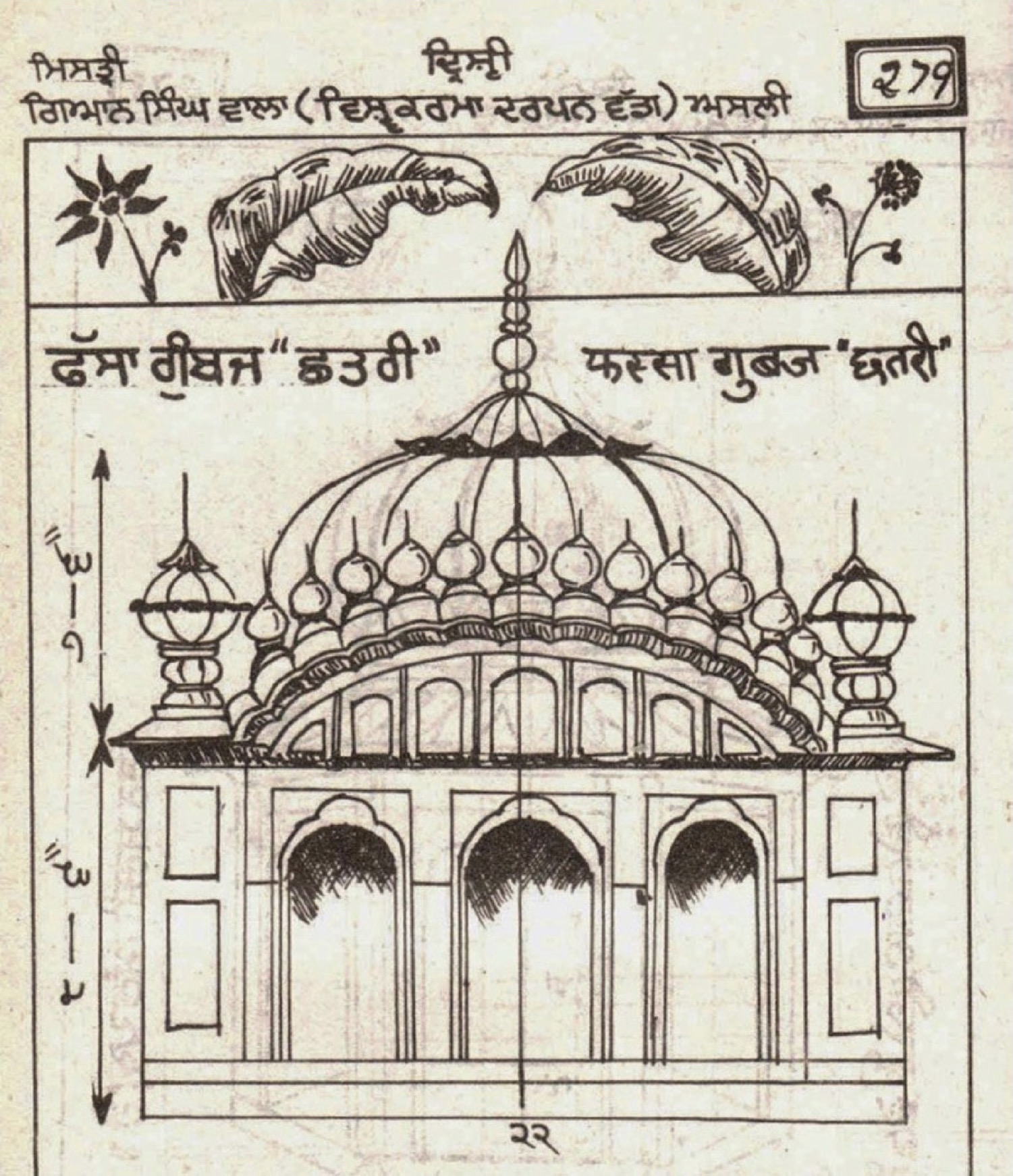
Architectural sketch depicting a dome design by Gian Singh Naqqash from page 279 of his book, Vishkarma Darpan, ca.1926

There are over 500 historical gurdwaras across India and Pakistan, many of which are associated with significant events in the lives of the Sikh Gurus. Apart from religious buildings, Sikh architecture includes secular forts, bungas (residential places), palaces, and colleges. The religious structure is called gurdwara (a place where the Guru dwells). The word gurdwara is a compound of guru (guide or master) and dwara (gateway or seat). So, it has an architectural connotation. Sikh gurdwaras are generally commemorative buildings connected with the ten gurus in some way, or with places and events of historical significance. Some examples are Gurdwara Dera Sahib (encampment place), in Batala in Gurdaspur district. It was erected in memory of the brief stay of Guru Nanak along with his companions on the occasion of his marriage. Gurdwara Shahid Ganj (Martyrdom Memorial) in Muktsar in Faridkot district commemorates the cremation spot of Sikhs who were killed in a battle between Guru Gobind Singh and the Mughals in 1705. The Gurdwara Shish Mahal (Palace of Mirrors) in Kiratpur, located in the Ropar district of Punjab, marks the birthplace of the eighth Sikh Guru, Guru Har Krishan. The key room in the gurdwara is the Darbar Sahib Hall, which houses the scripture and congregation.

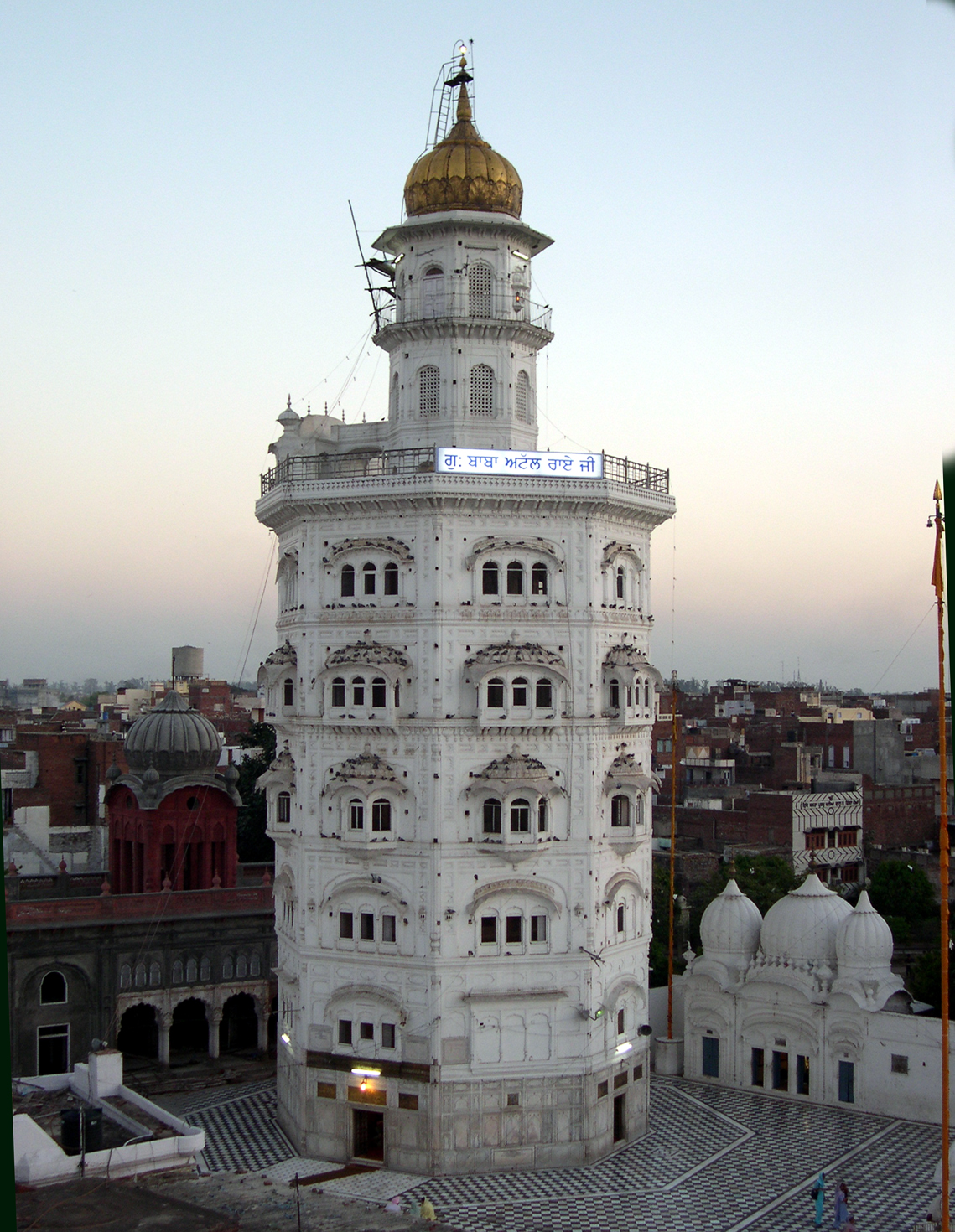
Exterior of the Gurdwara Baba Atal, located in Amritsar, India.

There are four broad categories regarding shape and layout of Sikh shrine architecture:

- square
- rectangular
- octagonal (ex. Gurdwara Baba Atal in Amritsar)
- cruciform (ex. Gurdwara Nanak Jhira in Bidar, Karnataka)

=== List of types of Sikh architecture ===
- Gurdwara
- Dharamsaal
- Baradari
- Sarai/Niwas
- Qila
- Burj
- Bunga
- Samadhi

== Samadhs ==
According to Zulfiqar Ali Kalhoro, studying the samadhs of Pothohar, states that Sikh samadhis were often decorated with frescoes, which usually depict both Sikh and Hindu themes, such as the Sikh gurus or Indic deities. During Sikh-rule, samadhis tended to be costly, grand structures with ribbed domes and elaborate paintings. However, Sikh samadhis erected during British-rule tended to be simpler, with fewer frescoes and shikhara or squat domes.

== Conservation ==
Sam Dalrymple periodises the destruction and loss of Sikh artwork and architecture to three distinct phases (which has caused more historic and authentic Sikh heritage now being located in Pakistan rather than India):

1. In the 1920s in the backdrop of the Singh Sabha and Gurdwara Reform movements, when hereditary caretakers were removed from controlling Sikh sites and the orthodox reformers subsequently erasing any heterodoxical elements from the sites now under their purview.
2. After partition in 1947, with the local Sikh populations of the land that became Pakistan becoming refugees in India, with the sites remaining in Pakistan becoming decrepit with no caretakers. Furthermore, sites in India now had to cater to a larger congregation, resulting in renovations to expand and rebuild the sites in the 1950s–60s, resulting in the loss of heritage structures and murals in the process. Formerly unique-looking sites with unique styles (such as the Patiala/Phulkian style found in Malwa, which consisted of sites with Rajasthani style domes, shikaras, and a synthesis of a Sufi shrine and fort) were replaced with a standardized appearance, featuring modern marble and onion domes
3. During the turmoil of the 1980s, including Operation Blue Star, many heritage sites were demolished and then rebuilt, especially in Amritsar (such as the Akal Takht and Sikh Reference Library). It was through the numerous reconstructions of the Akal Takht (first by the government and then again by the Sikhs) that local Sikh leaders realized the money to be made in reconstructing heritage sites, which increased the rate of heritage sites being renovated, rebuilt, and standardized, with the loss of murals, original features, and unique styles in the following decades (such as at Nanded, Maharashtra in 2007–2008 and Tarn Taran in 2018).

In 1862, three Sikh bungas connected to the Golden Temple complex were demolished by the British administration to make way for a Gothic clock tower. In 1945, the Sikh temple management wanted to expand the parkarma of the site to make room for more pilgrims, thus they demolished a number of historical bungas. Many priceless Sikh heritage sites (including their architecture) have been destroyed or altered beyond recognition under the guise of "kar seva" renovations by various institutions and groups in recent-times, especially vulnerable are Sikh heritage sites in both India and Pakistan according to one scholar, who states it is due to "...the lack of will on the part of the authorities concerned to preserve them". In 2007, the Ramgarhia Bunga (Note: Not to be confused with the Ramgarhia Bunga of Amritsar.) (January 2007) and Baradari of Ranjit Singh (October 2007) at Takht Sri Hazur Sahib were demolished by Kar Seva renovators, with the latter destruction occurring during the night, despite Sikh protests and riots against the decision to raze the structures. An example of these haphazard and destructive renovations is an incident involving the top section of the historical Darshani Deori gatehouse at the Gurdwara Tarn Taran Sahib complex, which was demolished by Kar Seva groups in March 2019. Many groups are rushing to digitize what historical architecture and structures remains for posterity before they are lost, such as Panjab Digital Library. In July 2021, the SGPC launched a project to archive and document the heritage structures of the community and have set up the old doors of the Golden Temple as museum display when they were replaced. During the renovation at the Golden Temple in Amritsar to construct a new, main entrance (Golden Temple Plaza), a number of historical rooms and wells were uncovered but quickly covered with cement by the builders rather than being investigated further. Again in 2021, more underground structures were discovered while building a shoe depot and parking lot. The SGPC denied the importance of the historical Sikh structure discovered underground near the Golden Temple complex, which experts at the Archaeological Survey of India (ASI) deemed as 'historic'. Also, the SGPC made plans to raze a historical building known as Guru Ram Das Sarai, even in the face of criticism of the decision by experts. As many as ninety percent of Sikh heritage monuments have been destroyed in Punjab in the name of renovation and kar seva. Many historical Sikh structures that were destroyed by Kar Seva renovations include original houses of the Sikh gurus and their relatives.

According to the Sikh historian, Harjinder Singh Dilgeer:

Though kar seva babas had been renovating gurudwaras ever since anyone can remember, it was after Operation Bluestar, when the Sikh community donated generously for the massive rebuilding of the Golden Temple premises, that 'babas' began to appreciate the money-making opportunities such rebuilding threw up. The trend then spread across Punjab and in the last two decades, old heritage structures began to be demolished and replaced by garish, opulent marble gurudwaras.

— Harjinder Singh Dilgeer, Sikh historian

Gurmeet Rai, director of INTACH's Cultural Resource Conservation Initiative (CRCI) stated:

These pseudo-babas are armed with so much money but they spend it foolishly on rebuilding instead of restoration, because they are absolutely ignorant about the historical value of these old monuments. Somewhere along the line, the original, unpretentious Sikh architecture has begun to be perceived as something to be ashamed of. Our Gurus were simple, down-to-earth men of the soil, and their buildings reflect the simplicity and harmony which Sikhism is all about.

— Gurmeet Rai

According to Sikh scholar, Gurtej Singh, on who is to blame for the plight of Sikh historical heritage:

Whether it is the Shiromani Gurudwara Prabandhak Committee or the Akal Takht or even the political Akali Dal which draws its strength from the former two, there is no appreciation for our heritage. Scholars like us do not matter in the scheme of things, because we obstruct their commercial aspirations. The SGPC patronises these babas and they do not realise that they are converting history into mythology by destroying historical evidence.

— Gurtej Singh

Aside from Sikh architecture, the renovation of historical sites is a phenomenon across Punjab. Amardeep Singh stated the following regarding the renovation of the tomb of Heer from the folktale Heer-Ranjha:

Unfortunately, the tomb of Heer, like many other monuments across Punjab, has been renovated to a modern jarring tiled exterior, bereft of its historic ambience.

— Amardeep Singh

Peter Bance, when evaluating the status of Sikh sites in present-day India, where the majority of Sikhs live today, criticizes the destruction of the originality of 19th-century-era Sikh sites under the guise of "renovation", whereby historical structures are toppled and new buildings take their former place. An example cited by him of sites losing their originality relates to nanakshahi bricks, which are characteristic of Sikh architecture from the 19th century, being replaced by renovators of historical Sikh sites in India by marble and gold. Bance advocates that a grassroots movement advocating for the proper restoration and preservation of historical Sikh sites and their original architecture is necessary, which works together with private enthusiasts and government bodies in-cooperation with one another. Bance further claims that a lack of willpower rather than a lack of funds is responsible for the poor conservation of Sikh historical sites. Bance believes that the way forward in the modern-age to conserve Sikh heritage must be a digital approach, where social networking and technology is utilized to share research, build-up archives, and promote tourism to these sites. Increased tourism has the potential to increase efforts to preserve and restore Sikh heritage sites. Bance uses the Instagram platform to bring light to forgotten Sikh heritage lying in Pakistan with the wider community, using engagements there to generate social awareness and passion. Through his Instagram account, Bance has been contacted by persons interested in restoring Sikh heritage sites, which have allowed them to be connected with others who specialize in this field. Furthermore, he claims that on a weekly-basis hundreds of members of the general public from both India and Pakistan contact him through social media requesting him to visit their locality to document the Sikh heritage located there, as they lack the know-how on how to do this themselves.

Shahid Shabbir is a Pakistani historian and journalist who has documented countless Sikh heritage sites (most often neglected, dilapidated, or abandoned) located in his country, including their extant artwork and architecture. Sikh architecture remains a seldom studied or researched subject. A number of books have been published documenting Sikh architecture remaining in Pakistan, most recently by Amardeep Singh and Dalvir Pannu.

Virasati Asthan Seva is a Sikh charity dedicated toward preserving historical Sikh sites, known as Asthāns. Some of their current restoration projects are the Havelī Kavī Santokh Singh in Kaithal, Haryana and Gurdwara Bābā Bikram Singh Bedi in Amritsar, Punjab. According to INTACH and Gurmeet Rai of Cultural Resource Conservation Initiative (CRCI), 90% of Sikh heritage structures in India have been demolished and lost to Kar Seva renovations. The list of destroyed sites include the house of Guru Nanak's sister at Sultanpur Lodi, Bebe Nanaki (destroyed by Baba Jagtar Singh in 2003), the houses of gurus Amar Das and Ram Das in Amritsar, Gurudwara Jyoti Swarup at Sirhind (where two of the sahibzade were martyred), the Shahid Ganj near Mani Sahib Hall, Amritsar (location of 18th century martyrdoms during the Durrani invasion). Most of the most contested renovated sites are also the most historically important ones, connected to certain events in Sikh history, the Sikh gurus, or their associates. Newer, renovated structures sometimes incorporate aspects of the original site or building, such as wells. The reconstruction of historical Sikh gurdwaras in Indian Punjab has been proposed.

== Gallery ==
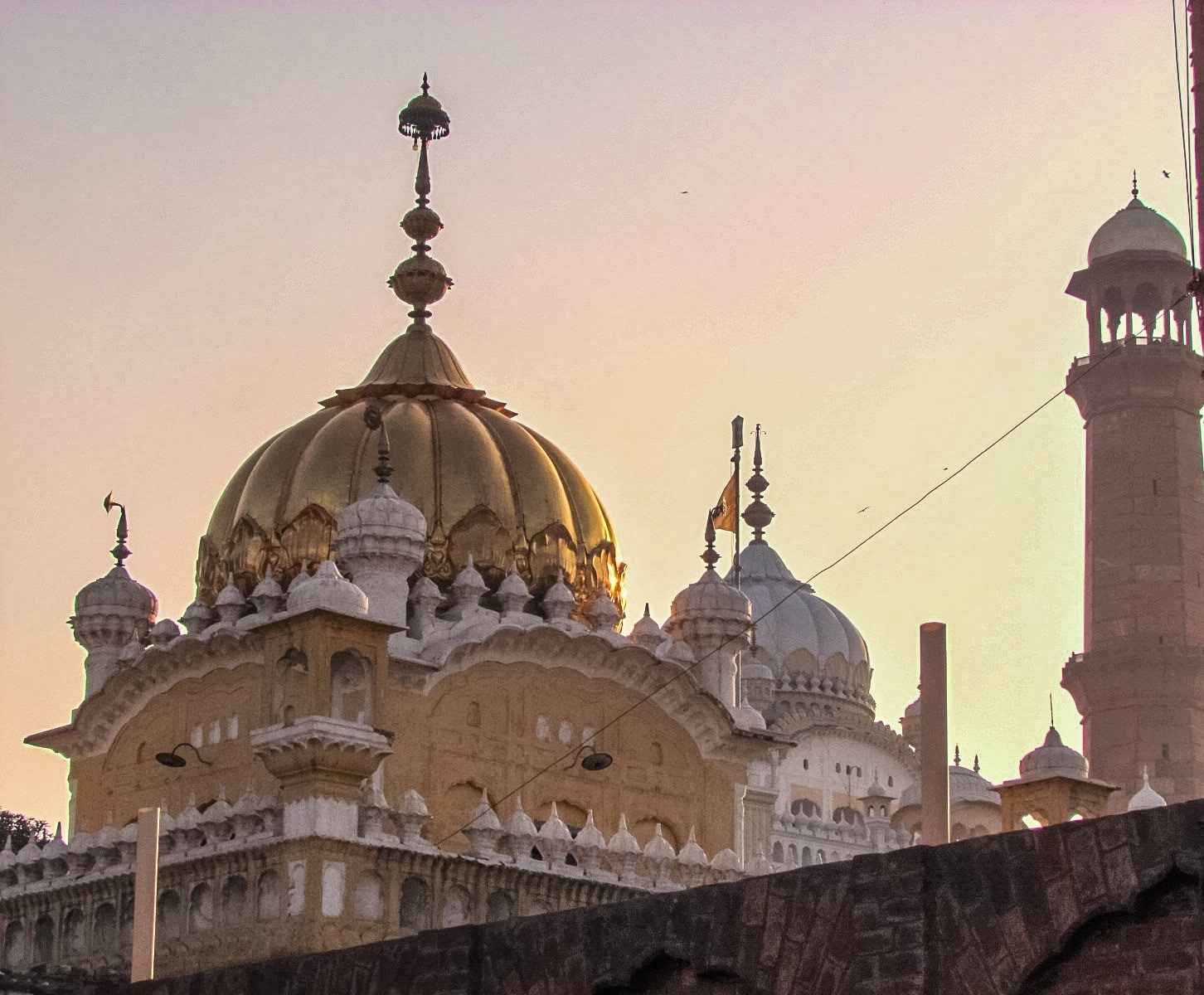
Golden dome of Gurdwara Dera Sahib in Lahore

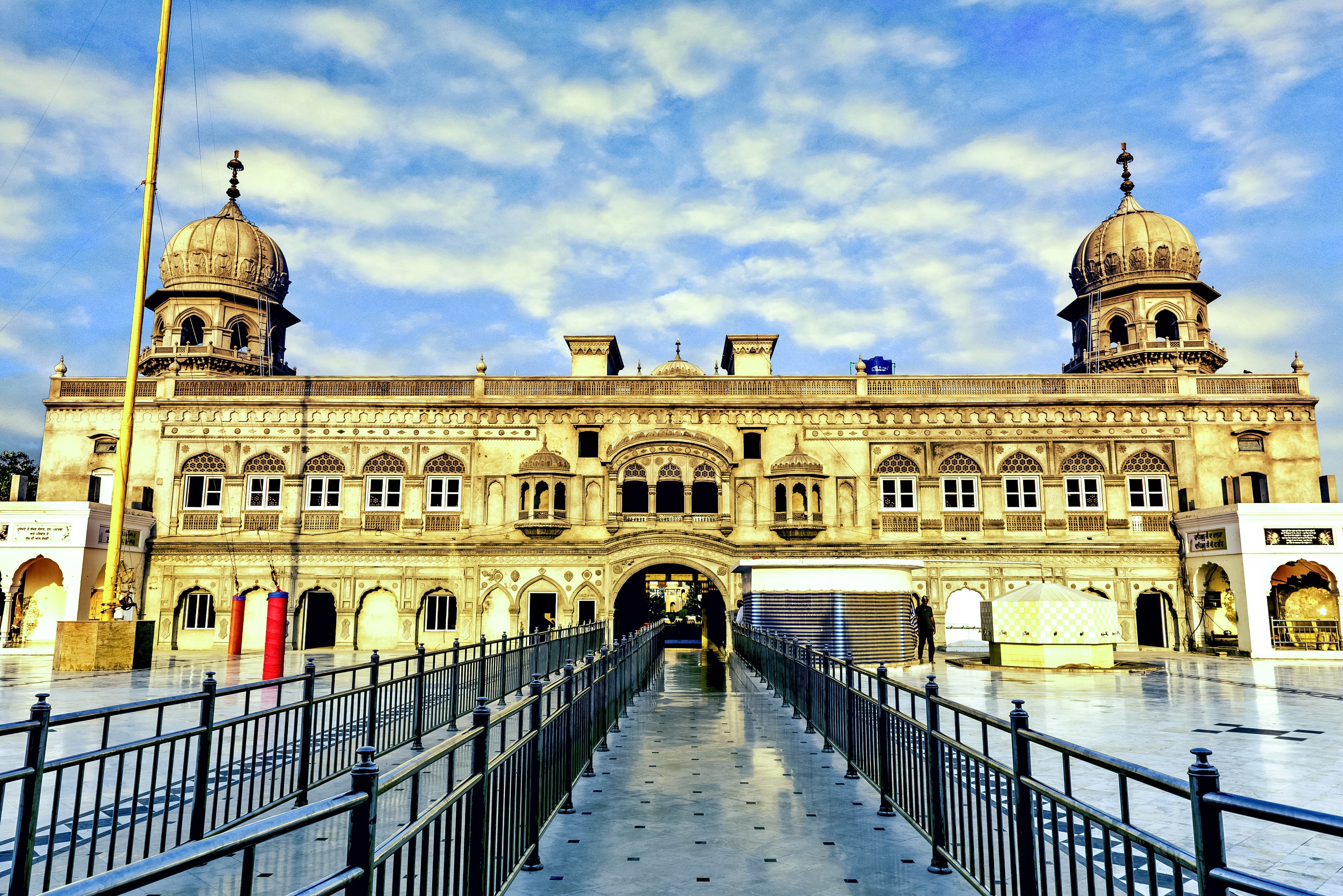
The Gurdwara Janam Asthan in Nankana Sahib, Pakistan, commemorates the site where Guru Nanak is believed to have been born. It was rebuilt by the Pakistani Government

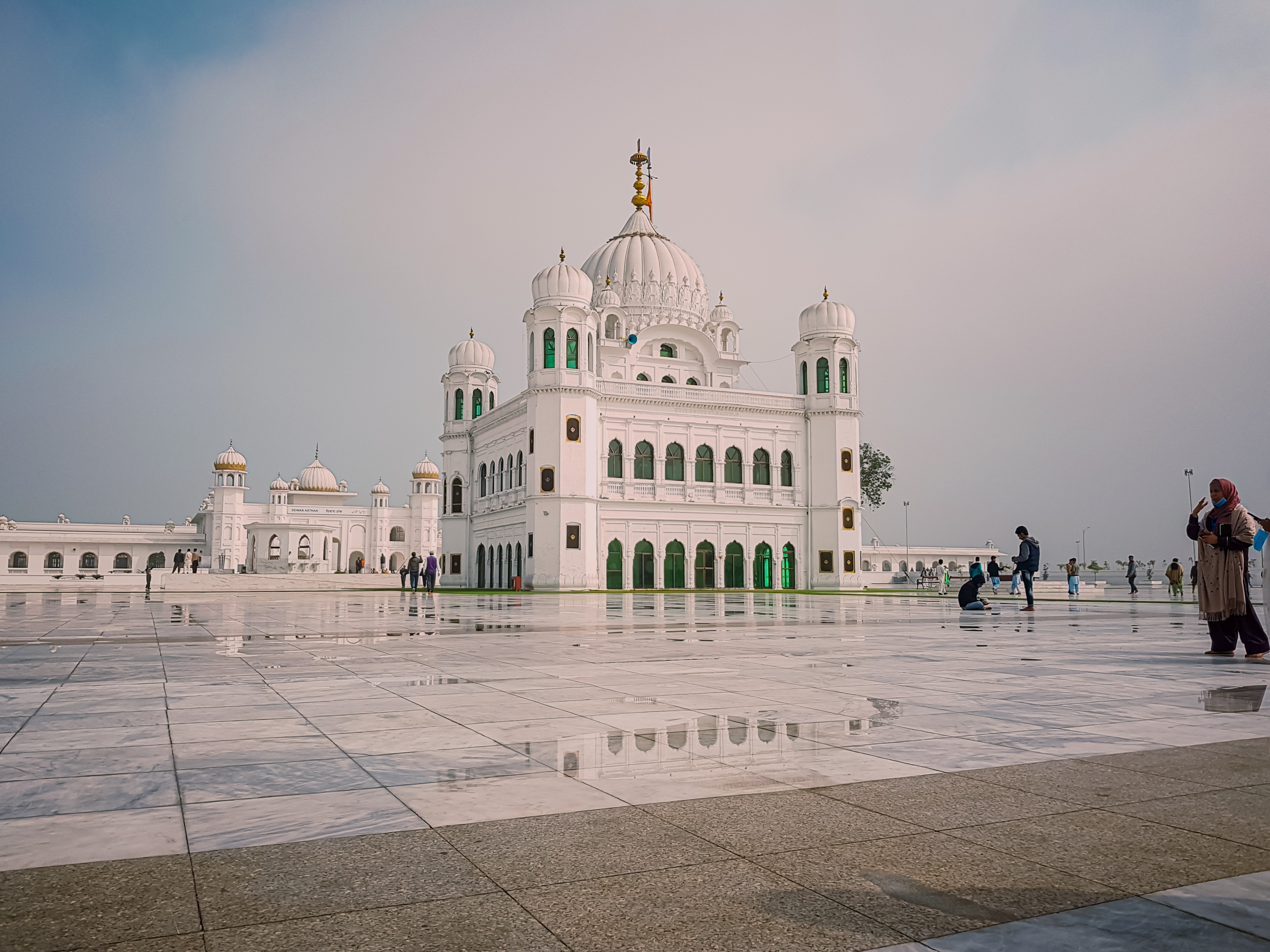
Darbar Sahib, gurdwara commemorating Guru Nanak, in Kartarpur, Pakistan

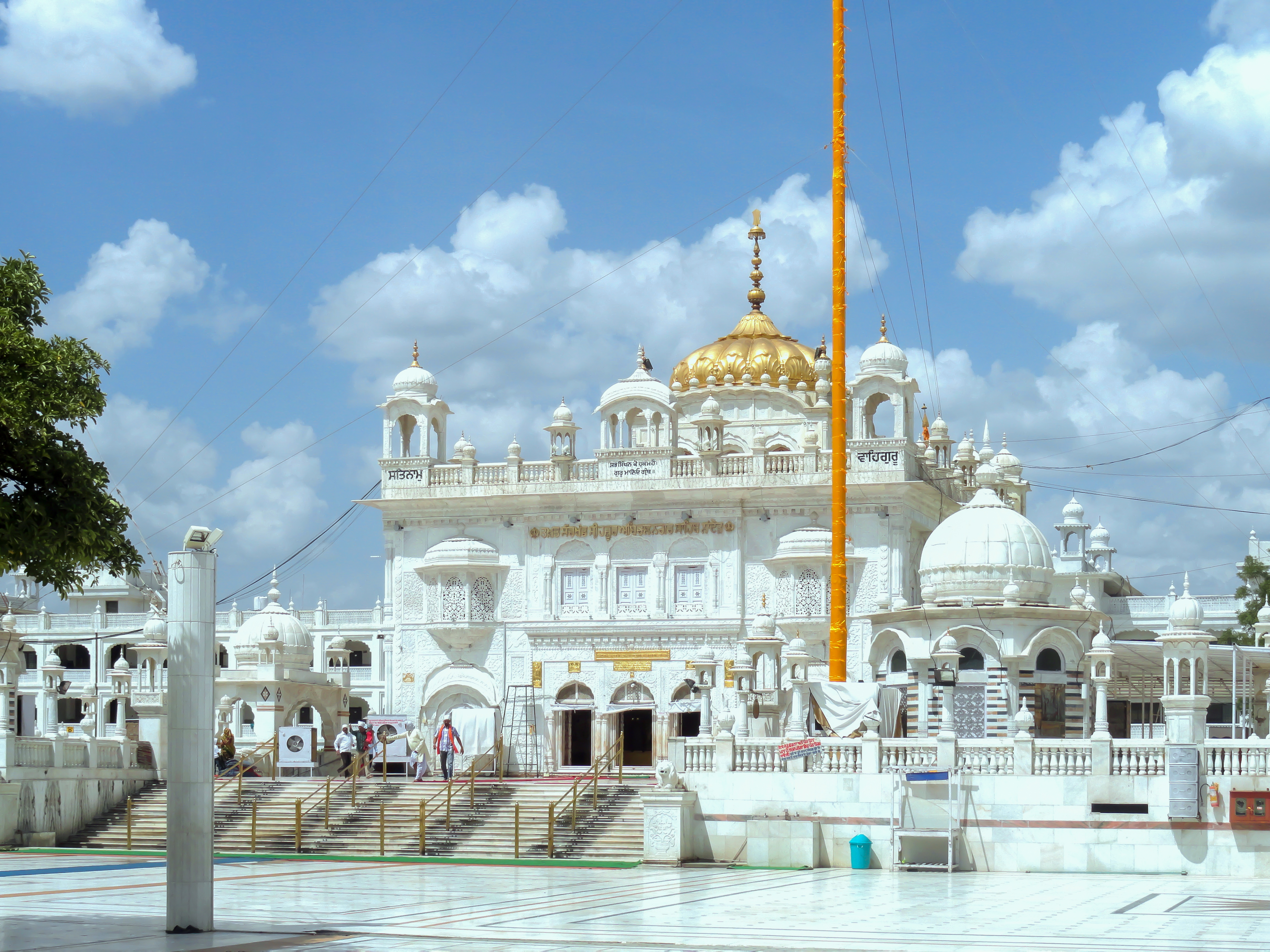
Shri Hazoor Sahib is a gurdwara in Nanded, Maharashtra, India; is one of the five takhts.

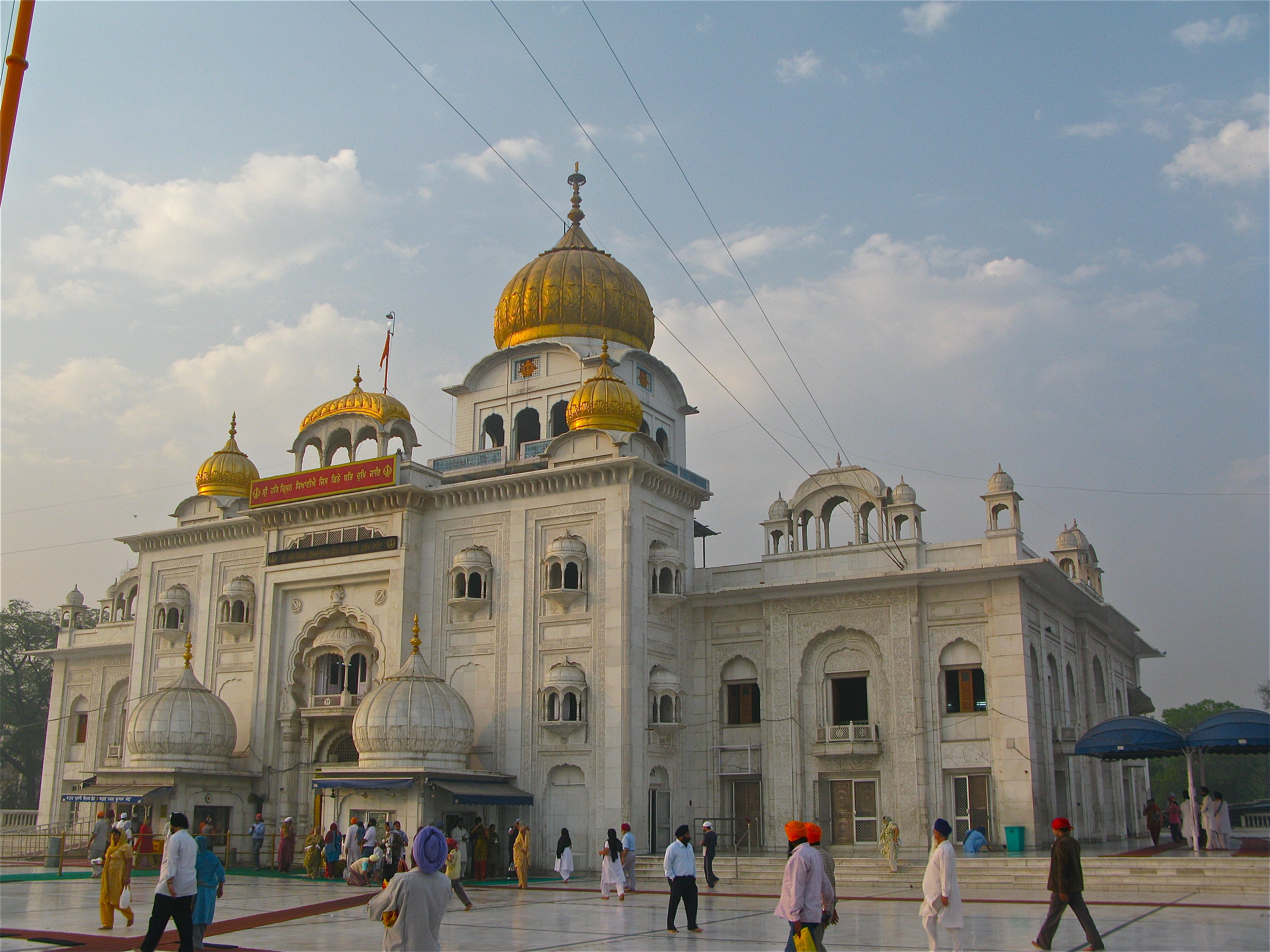
Gurudwara Bangla Sahib is one of the most prominent Sikh gurdwara in Delhi, India and known for its association with the eighth Sikh Guru, Guru Har Krishan, as well as the pool inside its complex, known as the "sarovar."

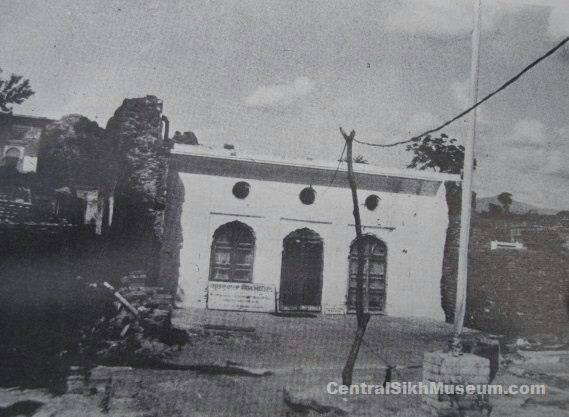
Original structure of Gurudwara Sri Sheesh Mahal Sahib, Kiratpur Sahib

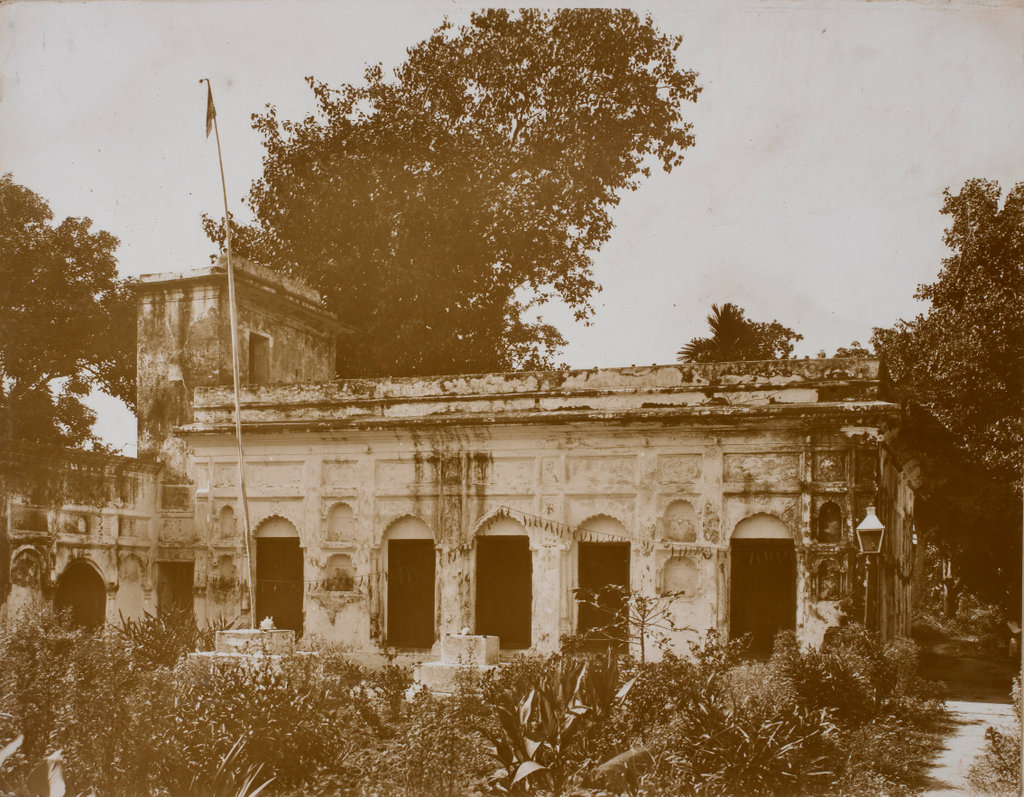
Photograph of a Sikh gurdwara at Dacca (Dhaka) in Bengal, India (now Bangladesh), circa 1920–21

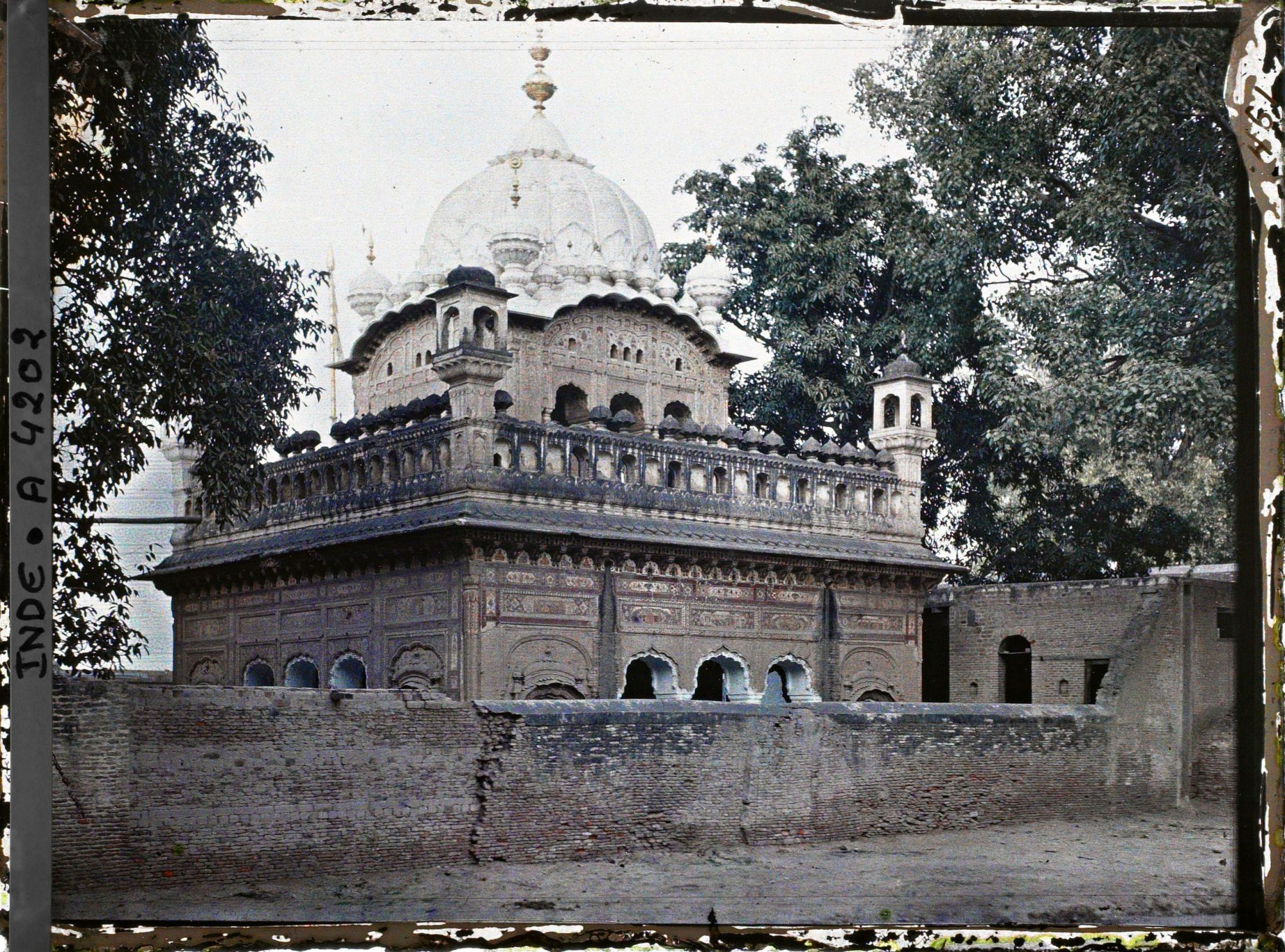
True-colour photograph of Gurdwara Dera Sahib in Lahore, India (now Pakistan), taken in 1914 by Stéphane Passet.

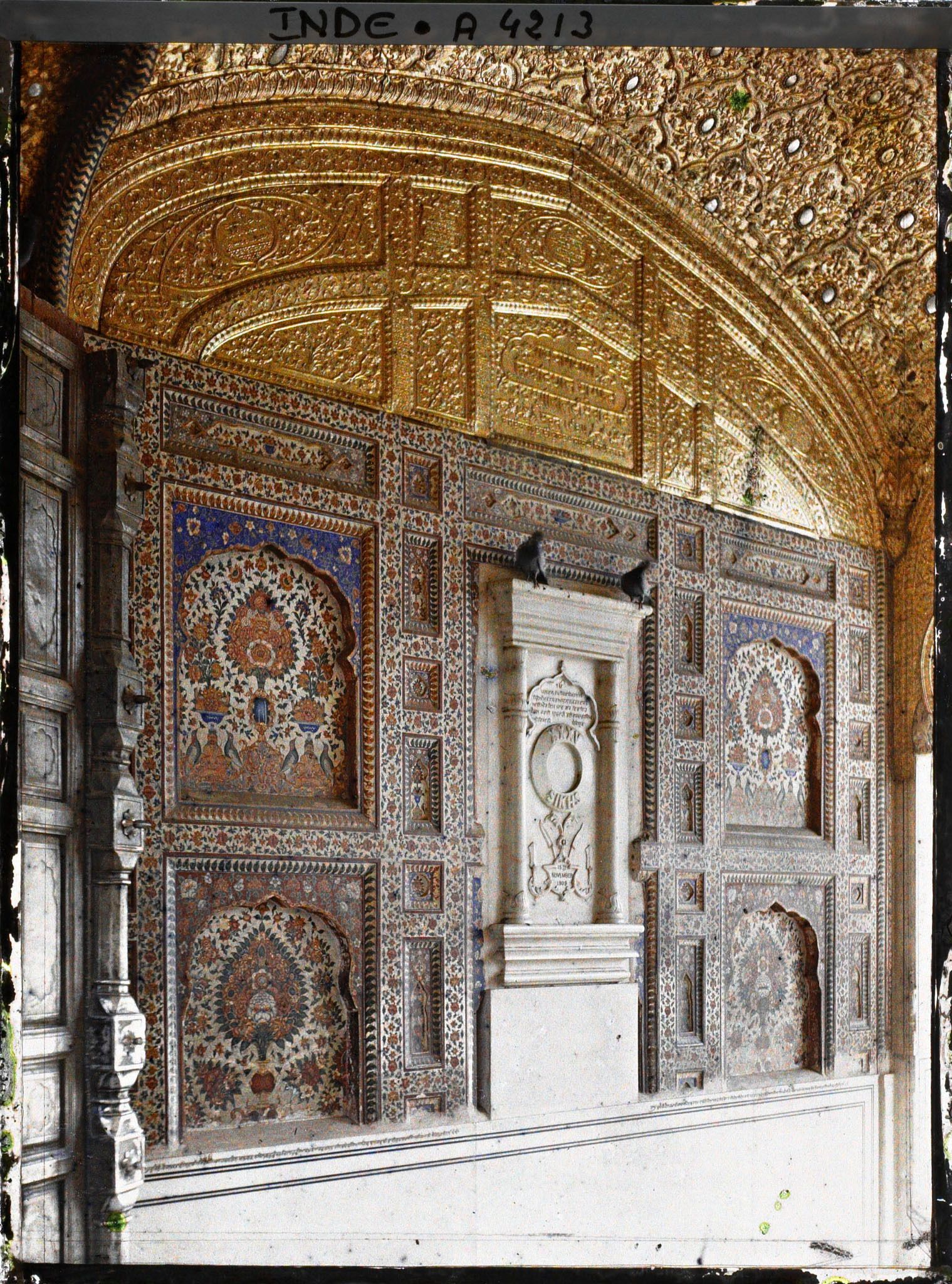
True-colour photograph titled ‘Interior decoration of the western door of the Darbar Sahib’, taken on 15 January 1914 by Stéphane Passet.

== See also ==
- Sikh architecture in Karnataka
- Nanak Shahi bricks
- Sikh art and culture
- Sikh scriptures
- History of Sikhism
- Sikh Ajaibghar
- Mehdiana Sahib

== Bibliography ==
- Arshi, Pardeep Singh, Sikh Architecture in the Punjab, Intellectual Pub. House, 1986.
- Brown, Percy, Indian Architecture (Islamic Period), Fifth Edition, 1965, Bombay.
- Brown, Percy, Indian Architecture (Hindu and Buddhist Period), Fifth Edition, 1965, Bombay.
- Singh, Mehar, Sikh Shrines In India, Publications Division, Government of India, 1974, New Delhi.
- Singh, Darshan, The Sikh art and architecture, Dept. of Guru Nanak Sikh Studies, Panjab University, 1987.
- Marg, Volume XXX, Number 3, June 1977, Bombay.
