= Darbar Sahib Hall =

Main room within a Sikh temple

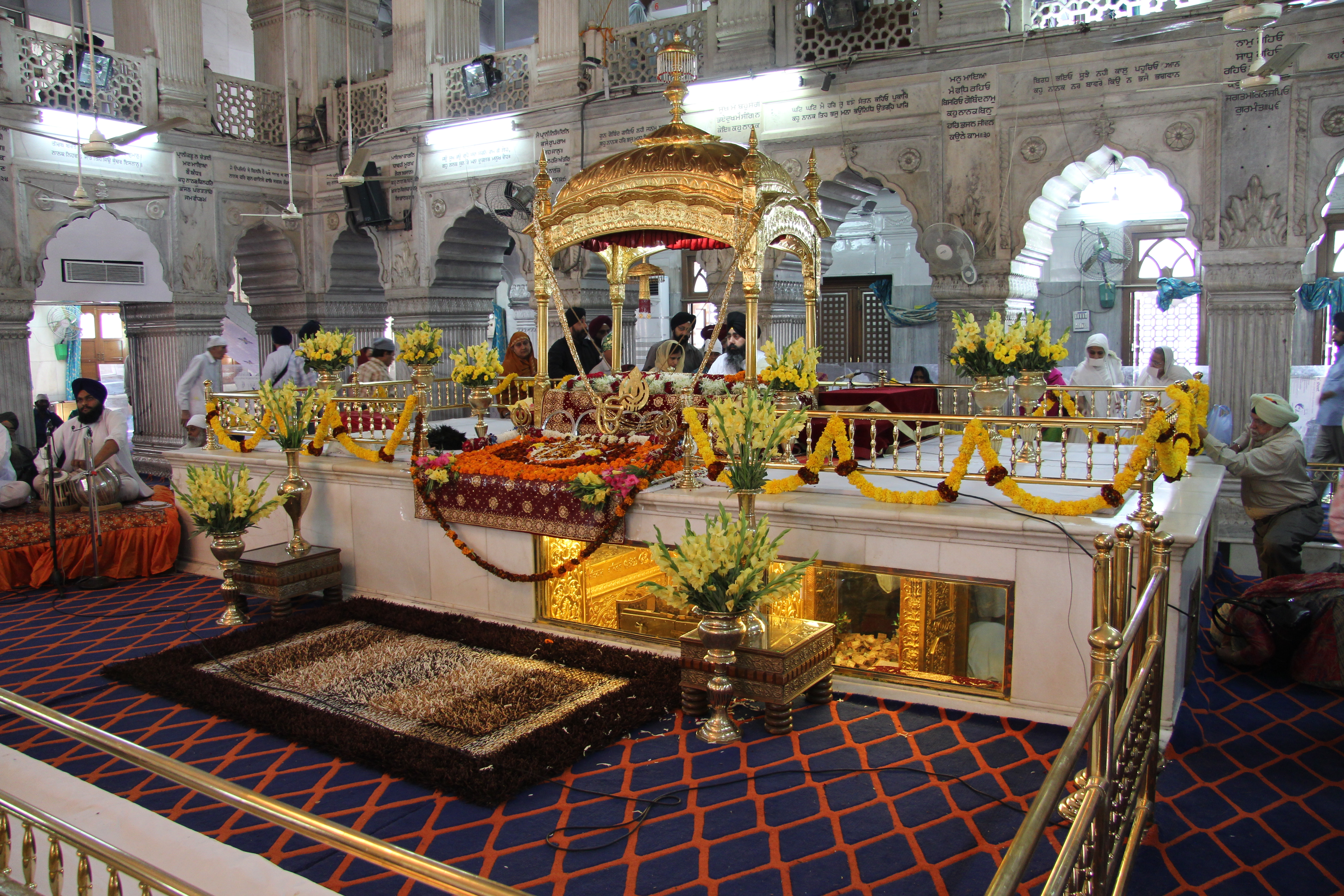
View of the front of the Darbar Sahib or Prayer Hall showing the Palki housing the Guru Granth Sahib

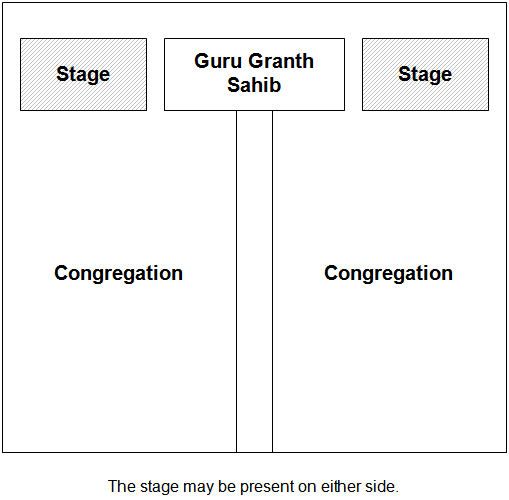
A typical layout for the Darbar Sahib. Men and women usually sit on separate sides of the hall

Darbar Sahib, also known as a Darbar Hall or Diwan Asthan, literally means the Imperial Court, and often refers to the main room within a Gurdwara. This room is where the Guru Granth Sahib sits on a raised throne, or takht, in a prominent central position. The local Sikh congregation also gathers in the room to meditate and contemplate on the scripture.

== Darbar Sahib - Diwan Hall ==
Darbar Sahib worship takes place in the Diwan Hall (prayer hall). In the Diwan Hall, people play worship hymns from the Guru Granth Sahib. People visiting the Gurdwara sit on the floor, often cross-legged, as pointing one's feet towards an object or person — in this case, the Guru Granth Sahib — may be mistaken as disrespectful according to cultural norms. It is also the traditional and optimal posture for deep meditation. Furthermore, sitting on the floor is seen as a symbol of equality among all people. Everyone sits on the floor to show that nobody is higher in status than anybody else.

Traditionally, women and children sit on one side of the diwan hall, and men sit on the other. However, mixed seating is in no way prohibited.

The Guru Granth Sahib is placed on pillows, which have cloths draped over them. The pillows are on a raised platform that has a canopy. The cloths, called romallas, cover the Guru Granth Sahib when it is not being read.

This platform is at the front of the diwan hall. Also in the diwan hall, there is another platform where musicians (called the Ragis) sit and play their instruments while the congregation sings hymns. Music is an important part of Sikh worship because it accompanies the singing of hymns from the Guru Granth Sahib. The hymns in the Guru Granth Sahib are called Gurbani, which means "The words of the Guru."

== See also ==
- Sikh architecture
