= Sarai (building) =

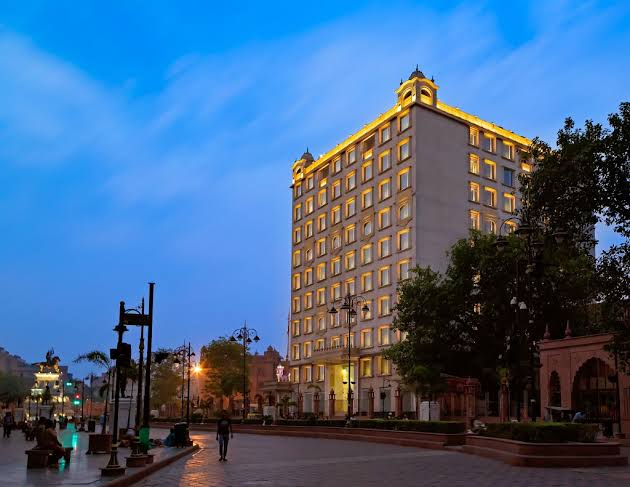
- Saragarhi Sarai near the Golden Temple complex in Amritsar, Punjab

General information
- Type: Sikh architecture
- Location: Amritsar, India
- Owner: S.G.P.C

A Sarai or Niwas is a type of Sikh structure that function as rooming-houses, inns, or hostels for religious pilgrims. (Note: Alternatively spelt as 'serai'.) Nearly all of the major Sikh gurdwaras have sarais associated with them. Many well-known sarais are attached to the Golden Temple complex in Amritsar and are operated by the Shiromani Gurdwara Parbandhak Committee.

== History ==
During the colonial period, many sarais were located near the public square of the former clock tower of Amritsar. This Guru Ram Das Niwas was originally built in 1931, with its foundation stone having been laid by Sant Sadhu Singh of Patiala on 17 January 1931.

There are six sarais operating to serve pilgrims of the Golden Temple complex in Amritsar. A couple of the sarais serving the Golden Temple were lit on fire during Operation Blue Star in 1984.

In 2021, The Tribune reported that the SGPC planned to demolish the structure of the Guru Ram Das Niwas for new constructions, which was criticized by heritage-advocates.

== List of sarais ==
=== Amritsar ===
Some notable sarais of Amritsar include:

- Shri Guru Ram Das Niwas – 160 rooms (free). Guests generally can only lodge at the sarai for three days at a time and must obey the principles of Sikhism during their stay. It is currently the oldest extant sarai of the Golden Temple complex.
- Shri Guru Nanak Niwas – 21 rooms (free). This sarai is also contains sectarian offices of various departments of the SGPC.
- Shri Guru Arjan Dev Niwas – containing 65 rooms. Located at the entrance point to the main sarai section. A branch of the Punjab & Sind Bank can be found in it.
- Shri Guru Hargobind Ji Niwas – containing 88 rooms and 3 halls. It is located near Gurdwara Baba Atal and its basement hosts the Sri Guru Ramdas Library.
- Mata Ganga Ji Niwas – containing 94 rooms and situated exactly opposite to the Guru Hargobind Niwas. The structure hosts the Internet department of the SGPC.
- New Akal Rest House – containing 45 rooms
- Baba Deep Singh Ji Niwas – containing 142 rooms and located near Gurdwara Shaheed Ganj Sahib (Shaheedan).
- Mata Bhag Kaur Ji Niwas – containing 41 rooms and located at Chownk Ram Talai, G.T. Road.
- Saragarhi Niwas

== Gallery ==
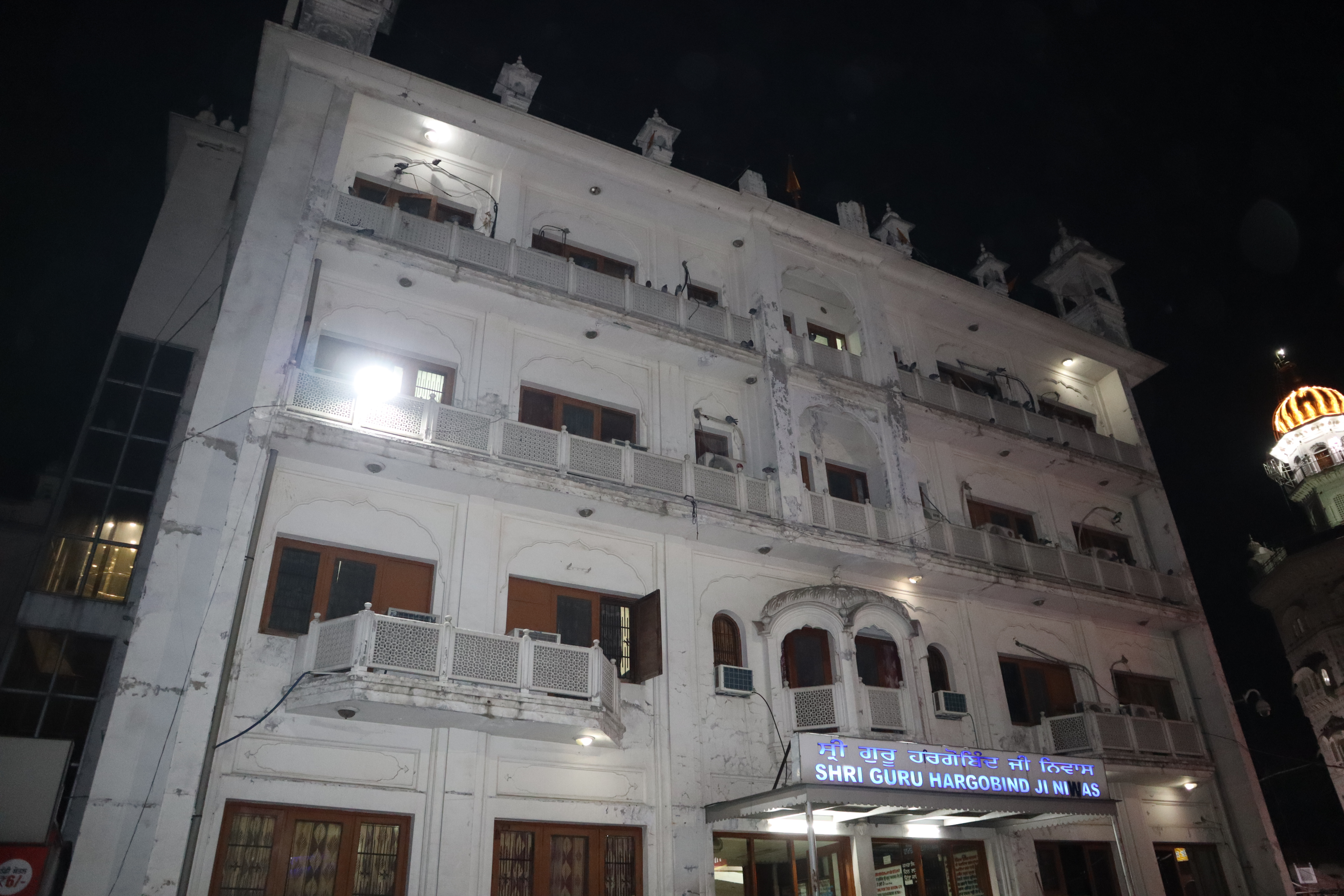
Photograph of the Shri Guru Hargobind Ji Niwas of the Golden Temple complex, Amritsar, Punjab, India, April 2023

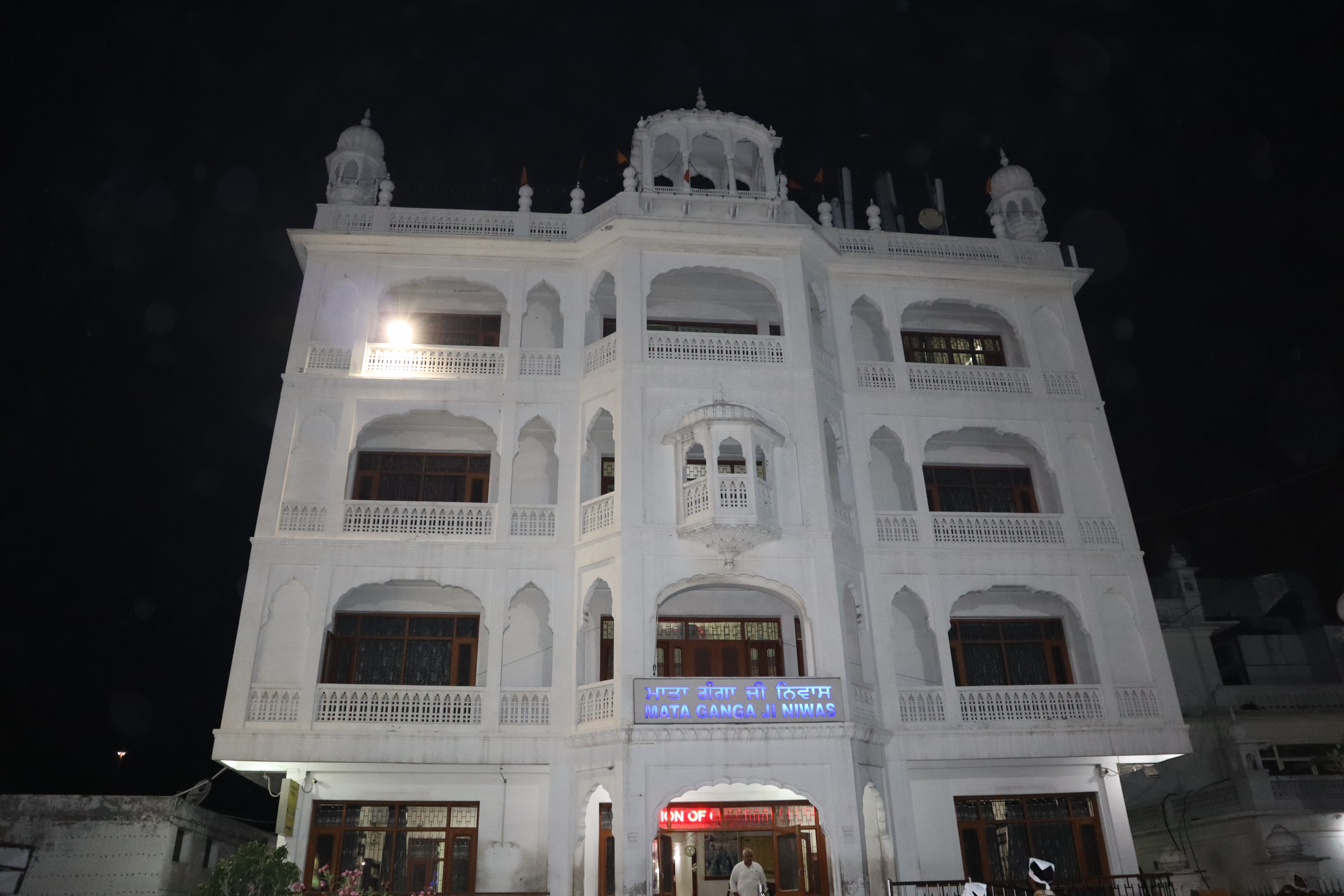
Photograph of the Mata Ganga Ji Niwas of the Golden Temple complex, Amritsar, Punjab, India, April 2023

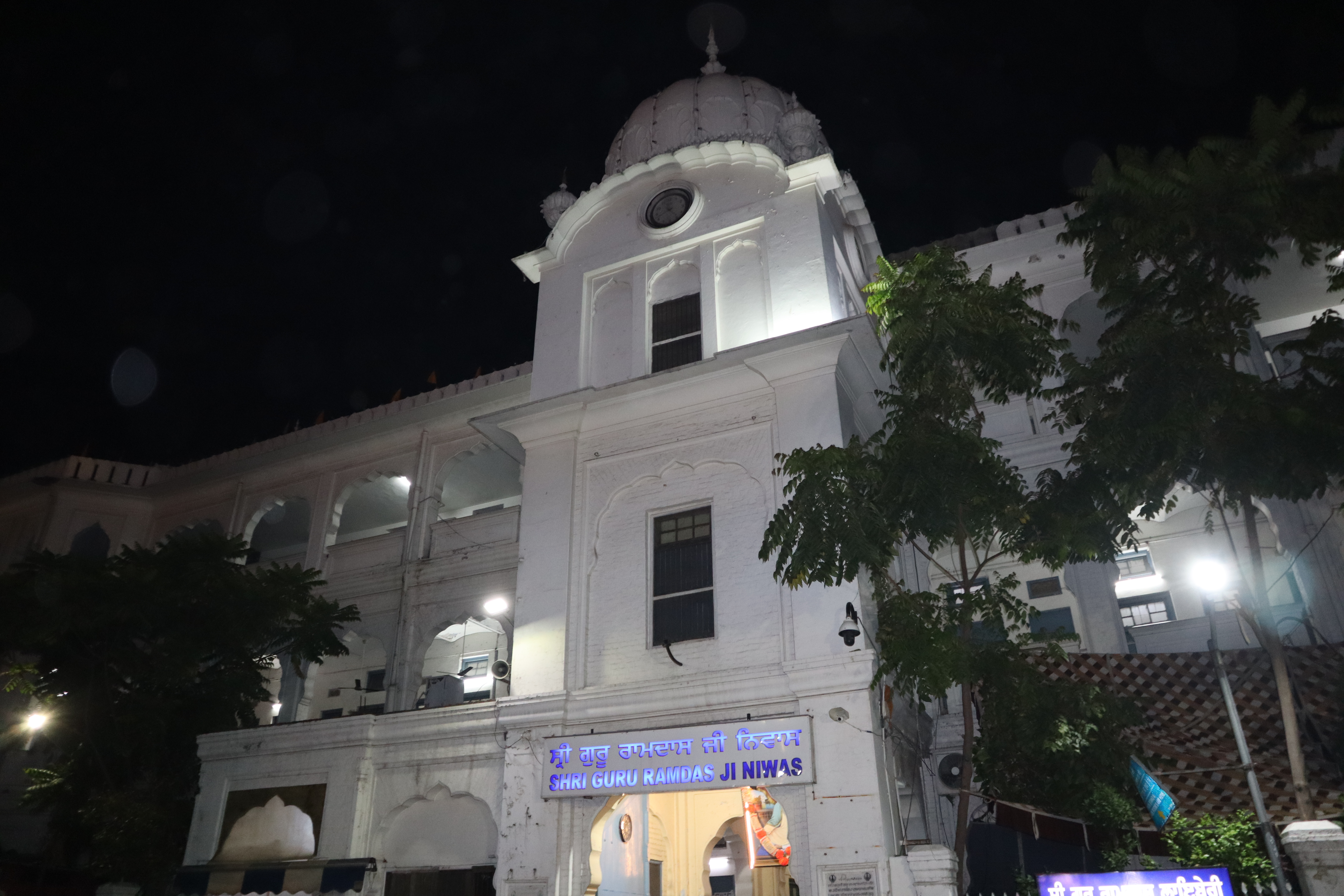
Photograph of the Shri Guru Ram Das Ji Niwas within the Golden Temple complex, Amritsar, Punjab, India, April 2023

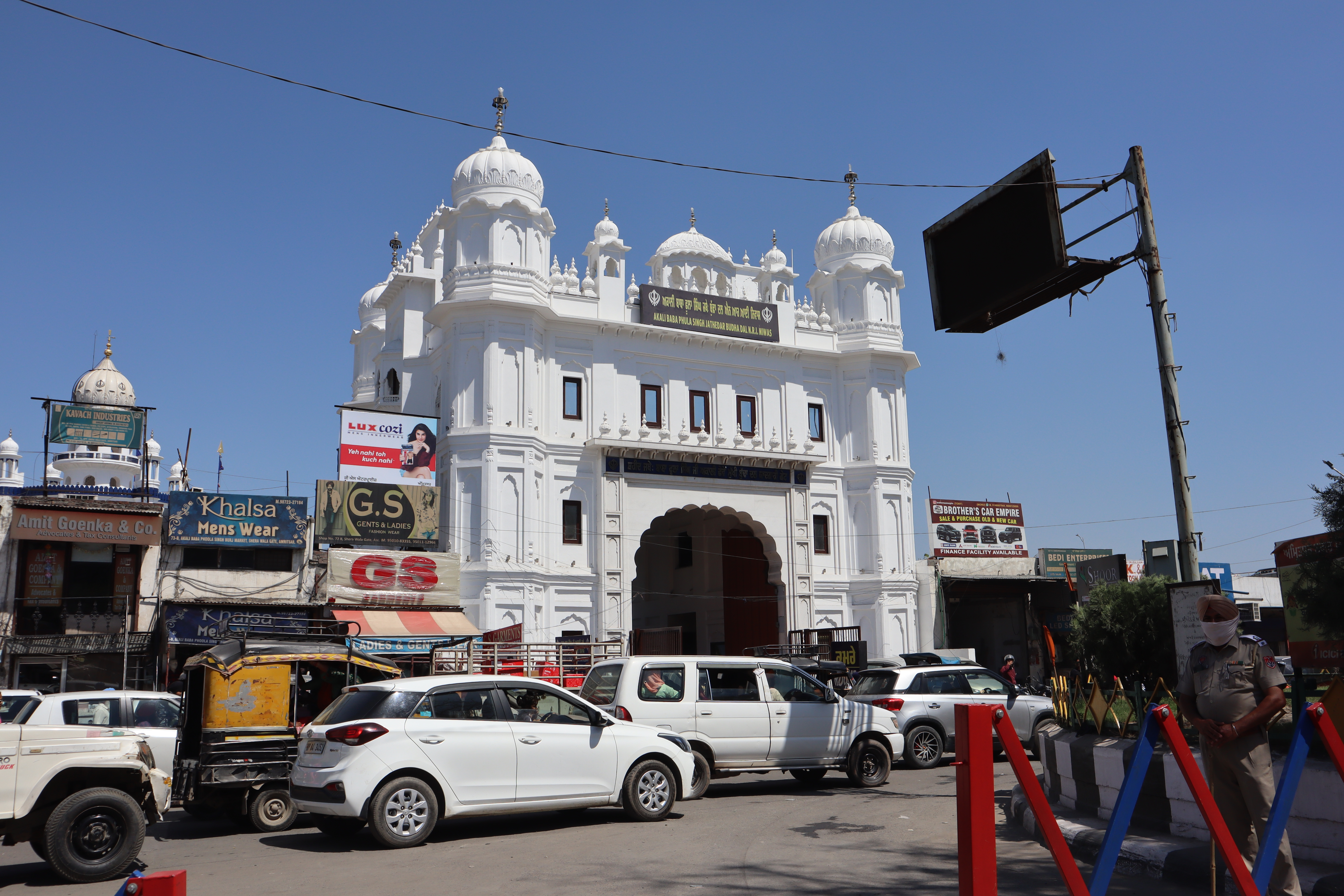
Photograph of the Akali Baba Phula Singh Jathedar Budha Dal N.R.I. Niwas, Amritsar, Punjab, India, April 2023

== See also ==
- Seraglio
- Dharamshala (type of building)
