= Allegory: A Tapestry of Guru Nanak's Travels =

Documentary series

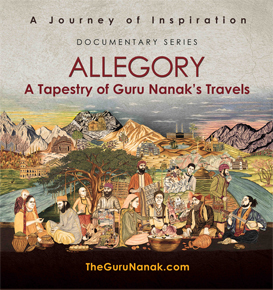
- Directed by: Amardeep Singh; Vininder Kaur
- Music by: Satninder Singh Bodal; Saleema Khawaja; Ustad B.S. Narang; Mahabeer Singh; Niaz-U-Din Hunzai; Zohaib Hassan; Ajay Tiwari
- Original languages: English; Punjabi; Hindi; Urdu

Production
- Producer: Amardeep Singh
- Cinematography: Salman Alam Khan; Deepak Verma
- Animators: Datti Kaur (Visual Artist) Prashant Grover (Illustrator)
- Editor: Muhammad Kamran Fazal

Original release
- Release: 14 October 2021 – 24 March 2022

Allegory: A Tapestry of Guru Nanak's Travels is a 24-episode multilingual docuseries, directed by Amardeep Singh and Vininder Kaur. The docuseries documents various multi-faith sites across 9 countries which were visited by Guru Nanak, the first Sikh Guru, during his travels in the 16th century.

== Production ==
The docuseries was filmed in nine countries; Sri Lanka, Iran, Pakistan, Afghanistan, Tibet (China), Iraq, Saudi Arabia, Bangladesh and India, and covered more than 150 multi-faith sites. Initially, the docuseries was intended to be completed in one year but it took more than three years to finish in English language and additional two years to edit in four additional languages.

The series was produced in English, Punjabi, Hindi, and Urdu languages with a production cost of approximately $2 million.

== Online release ==
The 24 episode series in English, Gurmukhi, Hindi, Urdu and Shahmukhi is available on the TheGuruNanak.com website.

== Reception ==
The series received more than 500,000 views on the website from September 2021 till June 2022.
