= Ishar Bindra =

- Born: January 10, 1921; Kallar, Punjab Province, British India (now in Pakistan)
- Died: August 12, 2015 (aged 94)
- Education: Dayanand Anglo Vedic College
- Occupation: Chairman of Jeetish Group of Companies

Ishar Bindra (1921–2015) was an Indian-American investor, entrepreneur and philanthropist. He was also the founder-trustee of the Sikh Forum of New York, senior vice president of the Hemkunt Foundation, and patron of the Sikh Art and Film Foundation.

Bindra has received numerous awards and has been recognized in many national and international events. In 1999, Bindra was honored as Humanitarian of the Year by the Interfaith Nutrition Network. In 2000, he was honored with the “Punjab-Ratan” award by then-First Lady Hillary Rodham-Clinton. In 2006, Bindra was awarded with the “Lifetime Achievement” award for his service to the community by the World Punjabi Organization during its International Convention in New York.

== Early life ==
Bindra was born to a Gur Sikh family in Kallar, a small village in Punjab, British India. He was the first in his family to attend college and graduated from Dayanand Anglo Vedic College in 1939. During his second year in college, he became engaged to Kuljeet Kaur. Three years later, the two were married on February 20, 1940. Bindra eventually became the father of seven children: Amrit, Pritam, Inderjeet, Kuldip, Virinder, Kanwaljeet, and Tejinder.

=== Time in the Indian Army ===
Towards the end of World War II, he became an officer of the Indian Army in Riwalpindi in the Ordnance Corps, where he was first stationed in Jahanpur, India, and later Singapore.

During the partitioning of India in which the country gained its independence from British rule while also separating from Pakistan, Bindra along with his family was forced from their homes in Northern Punjab. Approximately five and half million people traveled each way across the New India-Pakistan border in Punjab.

=== Career in telecom ===
In June 1948, Bindra left the army and started his career as a telecommunications engineer in India's Telephone Department. He began as a technical assistant and quickly moved his way up to an officer heading the department and maintaining the telephone services of several major district headquarters, sub-district headquarters and business centers in India.

In 1960, Bindra was promoted to deputy divisional engineer at the Telephone Department in Ambala but quickly transferred to Srinagar in 1961 to become the assistant engineer Trunks Telelphone System. He later held posts in Jammu, Patalia, Chandigarh, Ludhiana and Jalandhar. In 1975, he transferred to Dharamsala and was promoted as divisional engineer, the pinnacle of his career in the Telecommunications industry.

On January 31, 1979, Bindra retired after 30 years of government service in the Telephone Department of India.

== Coming to America ==
Soon after his retirement, Bindra moved to the United States and immediately started a business selling garments with his sons Kuldip Singh Bindra on Long Island, New York. They introduced Indian fashions into the markets they sold in such as ghaghras, gauze kurtas, bagroo skirt (block-printed skirts), which all quickly became a very popular. The business started with one booth at a flea market but quickly expanded to multiple booths, becoming profitable enough for them to expand their business into a garment wholesale company. The company came to be known as Jeetish, a combination of Jeet (short his Ishar's wife's name Kuljeet) and Ish (short for Ishar).

=== The Jeetish Group of Companies ===
The Jeetish Group of Companies began as an importer of primarily women's apparel that catered to major retailers as well as boutiques and local vendors all across the United States. The initial product line started with ladies garments such as dresses, skirts, blouses, jump suits and skirt sets. In 1984, it began importing crinkle ladies dresses from Greece and became one of the first companies to successfully launch the product in the US, allowing the company to establish a reputation that gave it access to mainstream department and chain stores in the US.

In 1987, Verinder joined Jeetish. Soon after, the company opened a showroom in the main garment district in New York and grew to become a multimillion-dollar company. It has become a diversified business with interests in apparel, commodities, real estate, and imports and exports.

== Personal life ==
Bindra had been married for the past seventy years to Mrs. Kuljit Kaur. They have seven children, seventeen grandchildren, and ten great-grandchildren.

=== Philanthropy ===
Bindra is heavily involved in many charitable and humanitarian causes. His efforts have been acknowledged by the Interfaith Nutrition Network, which honored him with the “Humanitarian of the Year” award. He was the first Indian American recipient of the prize. He has also been honored by President Bill Clinton for his work. Bindra was awarded with the “Lifetime Achievement” award for his service to the community by the World Punjabi Organization during its International Convention in New York.

He was honored by the Nargis Dutt Memorial Foundation, a nonprofit organization devoted to the support of medical facilities in India. He is also the founder-trustee of the Sikh Forum of New York, senior vice president of the Hemkunt Foundation, and Patron of the Sikh Art and Film Foundation.

==== Sardarni Kuljit Kaur Bindra Chair in Sikh Studies ====
One of his most notable contributions is the Sardarni Kuljit Kaur Bindra Chair in Sikh Studies established at Hofstra University. The chair was established in April 2000, and its principal aim was to promote academic study of the Sikh religion, culture and history. In order to do so, it would support the appointment of a faculty member in Sikh Studies, build Hofstra University library's holdings in Sikhism, provide scholarship assistance to students interested in Sikh religion and culture, and fund annual conferences and lectures directed toward the academic community as well as the general public.

==== Guru Nanak Interfaith Prize ====
On April 4, 2006, Bindra established the Guru Nanak Interfaith Prize. On the recommendation of the selection committee, the prize is given biennially to individuals (or organizations) who have made significant contributions in promoting inter-religious dialogue, have made efforts to end religious and ethnic violence, or have the ability to use the prize to further the cause of religious dialogue.

The Kuljit Kaur Bindra Foundation established the Guru Nanak Interfaith Prize as an endowment and it carries a cash award of $50,000, which is awarded at a gala dinner. In 2007, the Dalai Lama was approved as the Guru Nanak Interfaith Prize's inaugural recipient, and was later accepted by him.

Rabbi Arthur Schneier, president of the Appeal of Conscience Foundation, and Religions for Peace, a worldwide multi-religious coalition, was awarded Hofstra's Guru Nanak Interfaith Prize for 2010.

==== The Sikh Art Exhibition ====
On September 17, 2006, the exhibition entitled I See No Stranger: Early Sikh Art and Devotion was opened in the Rubin Museum of Art in Manhattan, the first Sikh exhibition ever held in New York. It was made possible by Bindra and his son Tejinder, who had established the Sikh Art and Film Foundation in 2004 and serves as its president. The exhibition brought together works of art from international and national collections that identified core Sikh beliefs.

The exhibition opened with a grand gala and was inaugurated by the then Indian Ambassador, Ronen Sen, Member of Parliament Sardar Tarlochan Singh and Honorary Patron of the Sikh Art and Film Foundation, and Congressman Gregory Meeks. The Assemblymen Thomas Di’Napoli and Upendra J. Chivukula, Ambassador Lewis, and Consul General Neelam Deo were also present at the exhibition.
