= Guru Nanak Interfaith Prize =

The Guru Nanak Interfaith Prize is a biannual, $50,000 award to "an individual or an organisation in recognition of propagating Guru Nanak’s philosophy of discovering oneness of humanity by exploring the differences that separate people". The prize is administered by Hofstra University, New York as part of its efforts in the advancement of religious study, and is supported by the Sardarni Kuljit Kaur Bindra Foundation, funded by a gift from the family of Ishar Singh Bindra.

Hofstra sought nominations though press releases and placing ads in major U.S. newspapers. Notable members of the selection committee included Desmond Tutu, Inder Kumar Gujral, Charles Schumer, Norm Coleman, David Rosen, and Martin E. Marty.

The first such prize was presented to Tenzin Gyatso, 14th Dalai Lama on November 11, 2007, by a delegation from Hofstra who had traveled to India for the presentation. The Dalai Lama was selected from a field of 75 nominees engaged in interfaith efforts throughout the world. Other notable individuals nominated included Arthur Schneier, Jagdish Gandhi, Sukhbir Singh Kapoor, Paul F. Knitter, and Frank Kaufmann. Notable organizations and groups nominated included Hartford Seminary and the Molloy College Institute for Christian/Jewish Dialogue.

== Recipients ==
- 2008: Tenzin Gyatso, 14th Dalai Lama
- 2010: Rabbi Arthur Schneier
- 2012: Eboo Patel
- 2014: Bhai Sabib Mohinder Singh and the Rev. Dr. Katharine Rhodes
- 2016: Pluralism Project at Harvard University and Serve2Unite
- 2018: Tanenbaum Center for Interreligious Understanding
- 2020: Dr. Karen Armstrong and the Charter for Compassion, and the Interfaith Center of New York
- 2022: Amardeep Singh
- 2024: Dr Thea Gomelauri and the Oxford Interfaith Forum, and Rt Rev William Swing and URI
