= Amardeep Singh =

Indian writer, researcher, photographer and documentary filmmaker

- Born: Gorakhpur, Uttar Pradesh, India
- Education: Doon School; Manipal Institute of Technology; University of Chicago
- Occupations: Writer, filmmaker
- Organization: Lost Heritage Productions
- Website: lostheritage.info

Amardeep Singh is an Independent researcher, writer, photographer and documentary filmmaker based in Singapore. Currently, he and his wife, Vininder Kaur, are the managing directors of Lost Heritage Productions, a media production house started by them. He formerly worked in the financial sector as an executive. He won the Guru Nanak Interfaith Prize in 2022 for retracing the journey of Guru Nanak, the first Sikh Guru, in his docu-series Allegory: A Tapestry of Guru Nanak's Travels. He is the author of the book-series Lost Heritage: The Sikh Legacy in Pakistan, after making two-trips to Pakistan. His work touch-upon the challenges involving historical baggage, borders, and security-sensitive areas.

== Biography ==
His paternal family migrated from Muzaffarabad, Kashmir (now in Pakistani-administered Kashmir) to Gorakhpur, Uttar Pradesh in India (then British India) just before the Partition of India in 1947. His father, Sunder Singh, was a goldsmith. Meanwhile, his maternal side had moved from Abbottabad.

After studying at the Doon School, he went on to study Electronics Engineering from Manipal Institute of Technology. He later did a master's degree in business administration from the University of Chicago, U.S.

He worked in the financial sector for 25 years, during which he worked for the American Express for 21 years. He moved from India to Hong Kong and eventually settled in Singapore in 2001. He became a Singaporean citizen in 2005. He resigned from his job in 2013. He had taken-up photography as a hobby during his time employed.

In 2014, he started researching on the visual ethnography of Sikh history and legacy. He went to Pakistan to document the tangible and intangible remnants of Sikh legacy in the country. One of the reasons he felt motivated to travel to Pakistan was due to his family having ancestral roots in the region. In Pakistan, he travelled to 36 cities and villages during his first trip and 96 locations during his second, including Sindh, Kashmir, and Balochistan. In 2016, he published his first book Lost Heritage: The Sikh Legacy In Pakistan. The book is based on his travels to 36 towns and villages of Pakistan. The book highlighted the magnificence of hundreds of Sikh gurdwaras, architecture, forts, arts, and culture.

He went on to publish his second book in 2017, The Quest Continues: Lost Heritage - The Sikh Legacy In Pakistan. For this book, he traveled to another 90 cities and villages.

In 2020, he published two documentary films; Peering Warrior and Peering Soul based on his experiences in Pakistan.

In 2019, he started working on ALLEGORY: A Tapestry of Guru Nanak's Travels, which is a 24 episode docuseries filmed across 9 different countries and 150 multi-faith sites. The English, Gurmukhi (Punjabi), Hindi, Urdu and Shahmukhi (Punjabi) versions are available on TheGuruNanak.com.

He is currently leading the Oneness In Diversity project, a multilingual audio-visual educational resource in English, Hindi & Punjabi. It introduces the life narratives and spiritual messages of the saints, whose messages of universal harmony are enshrined in the ‘Guru Granth Sahib’.

== Works ==
- Lost Heritage: The Sikh Legacy In Pakistan - 2016
- The Quest Continues: Lost Heritage - The Sikh Legacy In Pakistan - 2018

== Filmography ==
- Allegory: A Tapestry of Guru Nanak's Travels - 2021-22
- Oneness In Diversity - 2024-2025
- Lost Heritage Books - 2016-2018
- Peering Soul & Peering Warrior Documentaries - 2016-2018

== Awards ==
- The Guru Nanak Interfaith Prize - 2022
