= Clock tower of Amritsar =

Structure formerly in Amritsar, India

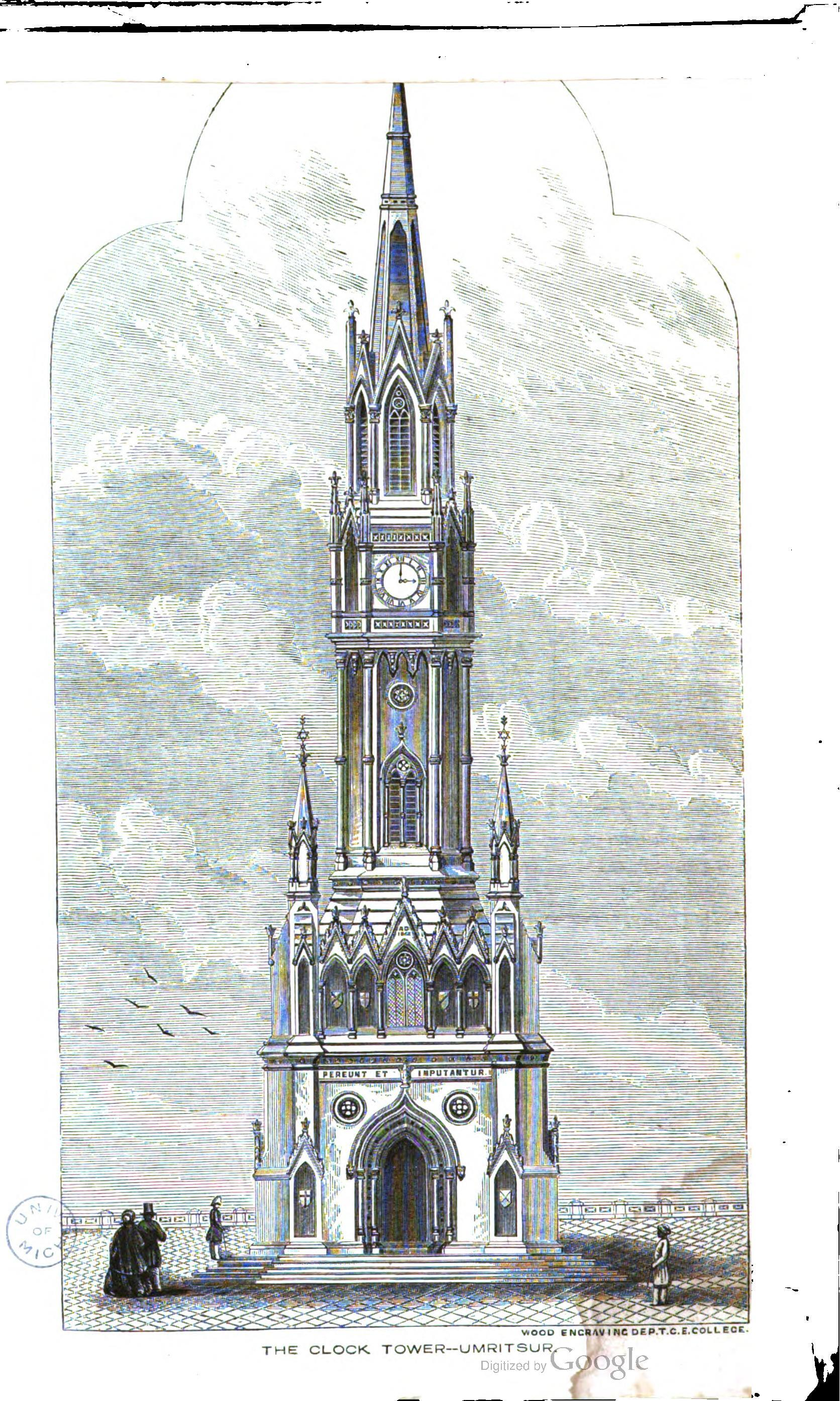
- Engraving of the Gothic Clock Tower of Amritsar, published in Professional Papers on Indian Engineering (Vol. II; 1865)
- Alternative names: Lal Chabutra

General information
- Architectural style: Gothic (Early New England Gothic)
- Location: Amritsar, India
- Construction started: 1862
- Completed: 1874
- Destroyed: late 1945

Height
- Height: 145 feet (44.196 m)

Design and construction
- Architect: John Gordon

The clock tower of Amritsar was a former gothic-style tower built with red-brick that existed near to precincts of the Golden Temple in Amritsar, Punjab, India. The clock tower was constructed after three former Sikh palaces were razed and destroyed to make way for it. Its construction was disliked by the Sikhs, not due to its appearance but rather its symbolism, viewing it as a colonial sign of authority at their sacred site.

== Names ==
In local parlance, the tower became known as Lal Chabutra ("Red Tower") due to it being made out of red-brick. It was also known colloquially as Ghanta Ghar.

== History ==
The clock tower was originally constructed between the years 1862–1874, costing 50,000 rupees to erect with it featuring a courtyard near it. It was built under the colonial administration after demolishing a former palace (originally known as the Bunga Sukerchakia Sardaran Da, later known as the Kotwali) of the Sikh Empire that once stood in its location. Two other Sikh palaces that were demolished to make space for the clock tower were Bunga Nau Nihal Singh and Bunga Ladowalia. It was constructed at the highest point of land in Amritsar.

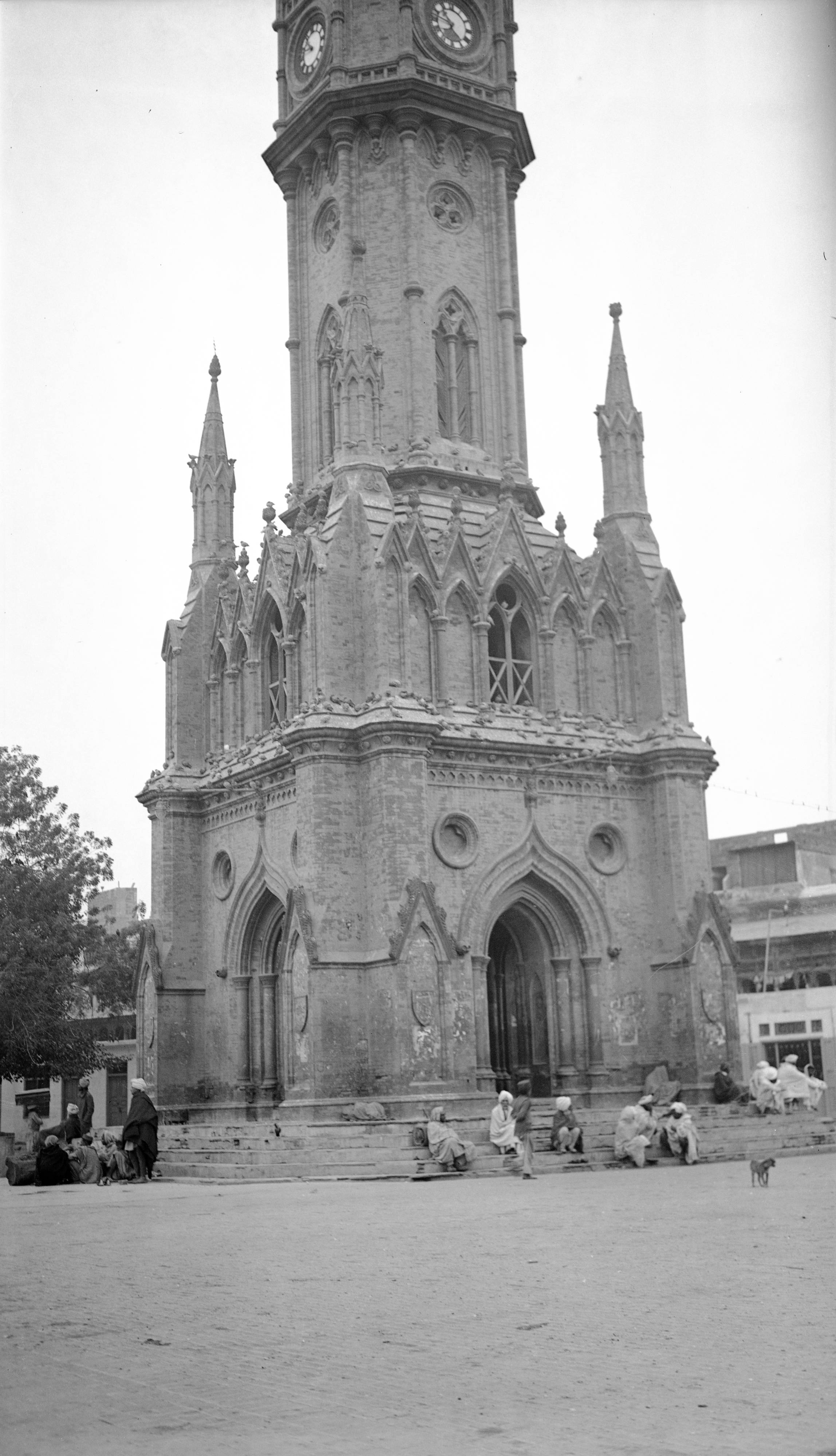
Photograph of the Gothic clock-tower of Amritsar, by Frederick Gardner Clapp, 16 January 1938

The construction was controversial with the Sikhs, whom disapproved of it being located at a great height near their most sacred site and considering it an "eye-sore" and a symbol of colonial power. Although the British likely did not have negative intentions by building it, with it being "a generous donation on the part of the European community". The structure had been mischaracterized as a church but was in actuality a clock tower. Contemporary Western artists and photographers depicting the Golden Temple complex often tried to leave the clock-tower out of the scene as it went against their orientalist ideal. The clock tower was located in the vicinity of Bazar Ghanta Ghar and Chowk Ghanta Ghar. The courtyard attached to the clock tower became a place of public gathering, featuring pigeon-feeding, wrestlers, gymnasts, and merchants, furthermore there were sarais offering accommodation to pilgrims. The offering of Karah Parshad (semolina halwa) for the Darbar Sahib could be procured at the vicinity of the clock tower's square to be offered at the principal Sikh shrine nearby and the square was decorated and crowded during Diwali and Gurpurab observations.

=== Demolition ===
The clock-tower stood for 70 years until it was demolished. The tower was demolished in 1945, perhaps specifically in late 1945 by the Sikh temple authorities in order to expand the complex's parkarma to accommodate growing crowds of pilgrims, with the British colonial administration acquiescing to the demolition. Other sources claim that the tower was dismantled slightly later in 1947, shortly after Indian independence. In 1947, a new gateway (deori) was constructed at the former clock tower's location, which acquired the name of Ghanta Ghar Deori. It houses a museum and a clock.

== Architecture ==
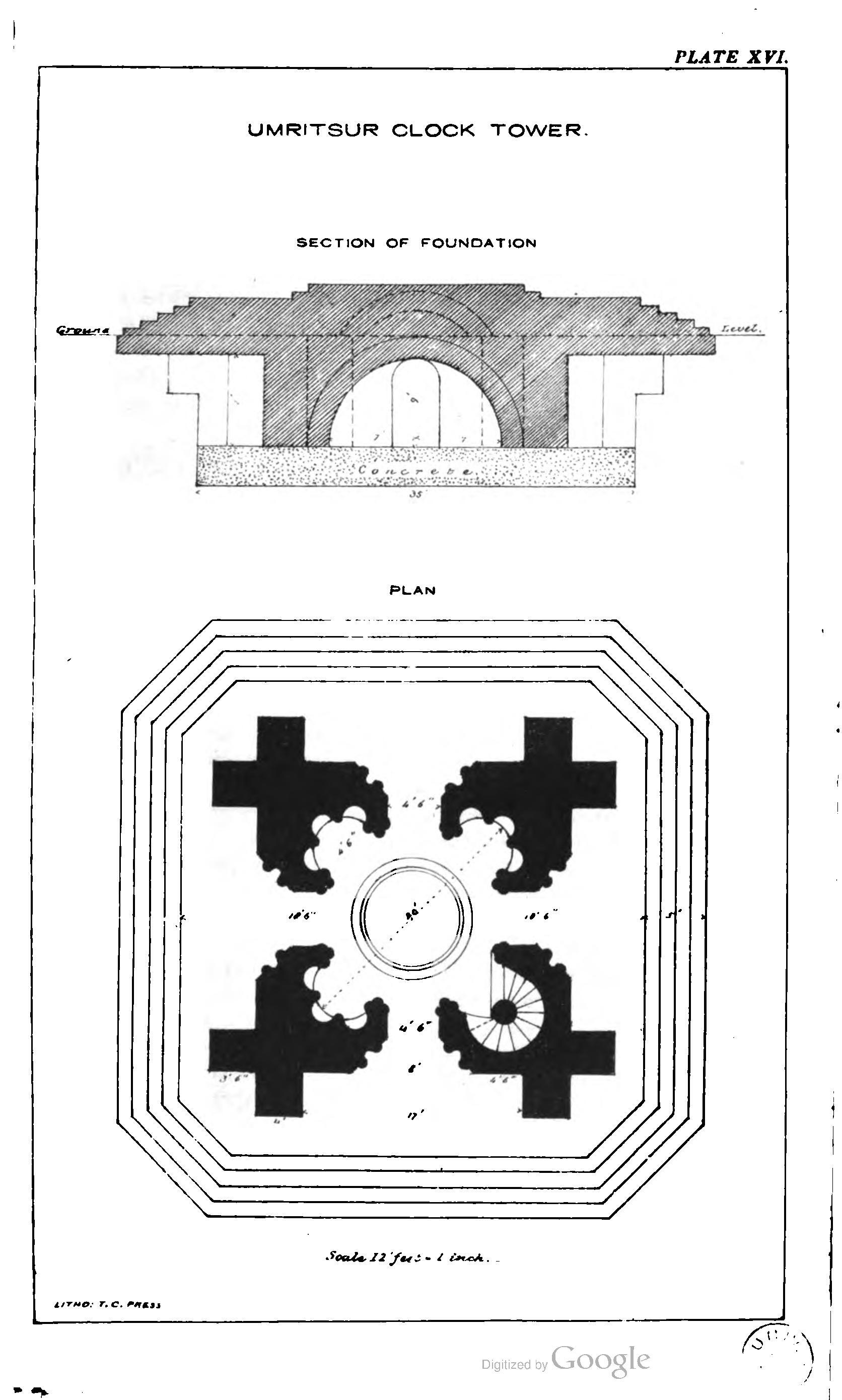
Lithograph of the section of foundation and plan of the Gothic Clock Tower of Amritsar, published in 'Professional Papers on Indian Engineering' (Vol. II; 1865)

The architect was the Municipal Chief Engineer of Amritsar, John Gordon. Original plans included a town hall to be built near it but these ambitions were later abandoned. The architectural style of the tower was described as "Early New England Gothic" by Edwin Lord Weeks in 1896. It featured a weather vane at its pinnacle and its interior chamber was 20 ft x 20 ft (6.096 m x 6.096 m). On all four sides, it featured illuminated dials etched in stone. The height of the tower was increased further from the original plan, with these renovations costing 23,000 rupees.
