= The 52 Hukams of Guru Gobind Singh =

Commands of Guru Gobind Singh Ji

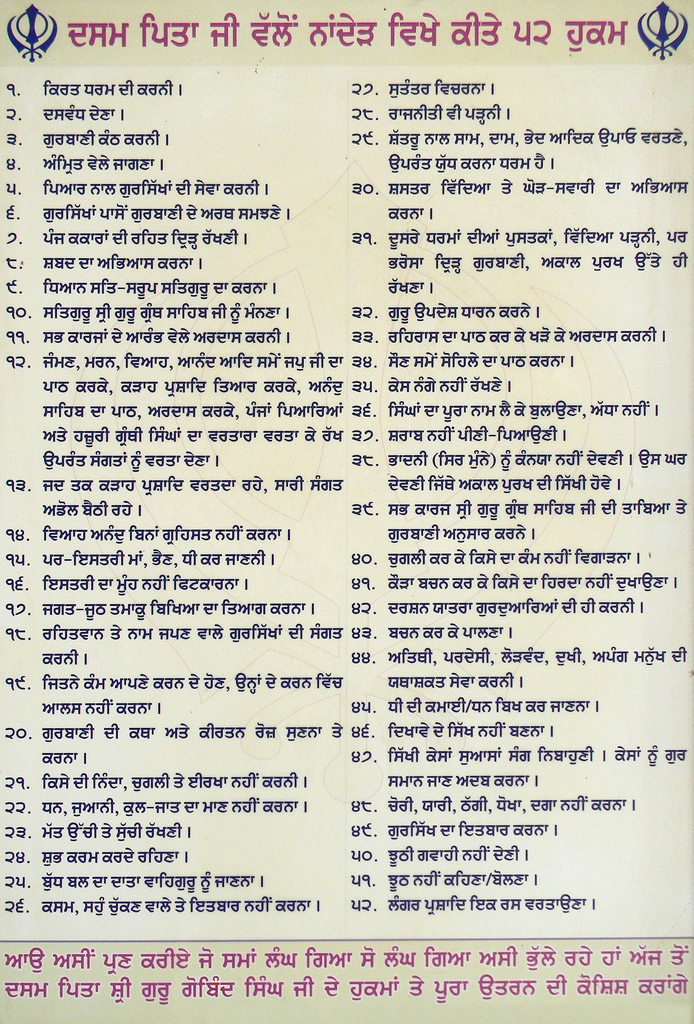
52 Hukams Inscribed at Gurudwara Hazur Sahib, Nanded.

The 52 Hukams are a set of instructions in Sikhism set by Guru Gobind Singh in Nanded, Maharashtra, India in 1708. These edicts sum up the ideal way of life of the Khalsa and serve as a code of conduct for the Khalsa Panth. Members of the Khalsa (baptized Sikhs known as "Amritdharis") aim to follow all the 52 edicts.

== List of the commands ==
A list of the 52 commands in romanized Punjabi with a faithful English translation is provided as follows:

1. Dharam dee kirat karnee – Make a righteous living.
2. Dasvand denaa – Donate a tenth share of your earnings.
3. Gurbani kantth karnee – Memorize Gurbani.
4. Amrit Velā utthnaa – Arise during Amrit vela (early morning).
5. Piaar naal Sikhaa di Seva karni – Devotedly serve the Sikh who serves others.
6. Gursikhaa paaso Gurbani dae arth samajhane – Learn the meanings of Gurbani from Gursikhs.
7. Panj Kakaar dee rehit drirh rukhnee – Follow the discipline of The Five Ks strictly. Adhere resolutely to the five articles of faith.
8. Shabad da abhiaas karnaa – Practice and rehearse the shabads.
9. Sat Saroop Satgur daa dhian dharnaa – Contemplate and assimilate the beautiful truth of the True Enlightener.
10. Guru Granth Sahib Jee noo Guru mananaa – Believe in and accept Guru Granth Sahib as the Guide to enlightenment.
11. Kaarjaan dae arambh vich ardaas karnee – When undertaking any task, first perform the prayer of Ardās.
12. Jaman, maran, ja viah mokae jup da paatth kar tihaaval (Karaah Parsaad) kar anand sahib dia punj paurian, ardaas, pratham panj pyaariaan atae hazooree granthee noo vartaa kae oprunth sangat noo vartaaouna – For birth naming, funeral, or marriage ceremonies or devotional reading paath; recite Japji Sahib while making Karah Parshad, perform five verses of Anand Sahib, and ardas; and then distribute Karah Prashad to the Panj Pyare, attending Granthi, and then to the congregation gathered for worship.
13. Jad tak Karaah Parshaad vartadaa rahae sadh sangat addol batthee rahae – Until Karah Parshad has been served to everyone, the congregation ought to be still and remain seated.
14. Anand viah binaa grahist nahee karnaa – Without the Anand Karaj marriage ceremony, carnal relations should not occur.
15. Par istree, ma bhain, dhee bhain, kar jaananee. Par istree da sang nahee karnaa – Other than your wedded wife, consider all women as your mothers, sisters and daughters. Do not indulge in carnal marital relationships with them.
16. Istree da mooh nahee phitkaarnaa – Do not subject women to cursing, or verbal abuse.
17. Jagat jootth tambaakoo bikhiaa da tiaag karnaa – Discard worldly ways, falsehoods, and poisonous tobacco.
18. Rehitvaan atae naam jupan vaalae gursikhaa dee sangat karnee – Make companions of Gursikhs who follow the Code of Conduct and recite the Divine Name.
19. Kum karan vich daridar nahee karnaa – Work hard and don't be lazy.
20. Gurbani di kathaa ate kirtan roaz sunanaa te karnaa – Listen to and perform the religious discourse/sermon and singing of the hymns of Gurbani every day.
21. Kisae dee ninda, chugalee, atae eirkhaa nahee karnee – Do not gossip nor slander, or be spiteful to anyone.
22. Dhan, javaanee, tae kul jaat da abhiman naee karnaa (Nanak daadak tahe duae goath. Saak guroo Sikhan sang hoath) – Do not be proud of riches, youthfulness, clan or lineage. (Regardless of maternal and paternal clan or heritage, all of the Guru's Sikhs are siblings of one family.)
23. Mat uchee tae suchee rakhnee – Maintain a high standard of purity in religious discipline.
24. Shubh karman tao kadae naa ttarnaa – Do not avoid performing virtuous acts.
25. Budh bal da daataa Vaheguroo noo jaananaa – Appreciate intellect and power as gifts of the all-knowing Wondrous Enlightener.
26. Sugandh (kasam/saunh) dae kar itbaar janaaoun vaalae tae yakeen nahee karnaa – Have no faith in oaths sworn by one attempting to convince another of sincerity.
27. Sutantar Vicharna - Rule Independently.
28. Raajniti vi parhnee – Read about politics.
29. Dushman naal saam, daam, bhed, aadik upaao vartnae ate uprant yudh karnaa dharam hai – When dealing with enemies, practice diplomacy (through conciliation, economics, or causing division of the opposing group), and exhaust all of these techniques before justifying battle with the adversary.
30. Shastar vidya te ghorh-savaari da abhiaas karnaa – Practice and exercise weaponry and horsemanship.
31. Doosrae dharmaaa dae pustakaa, vidyaa parhnee. Par bhrosaa drirh Gurbanee, Akaal Purakh ute hi rakhna – Read the books and science/knowledge of other religions. But keep your trust in Gurbani and Akal Purakh [The Timeless Being] resolute, firm, and tight.
32. Guroopdaesaa noo dhaaran karnaa – Follow the Guru's teachings.
33. Raheraas da paath kar kharae ho kae ardaas karnee – After reciting Rehras [evening prayers], stand up and perform Ardās.
34. Saun valae sohilaa atae ‘paun guru pani pita…’ salok parhnaa – Recite the late evening prayer Sohila [3 hymns] and the verse "Pavan guru pani pita…" before sleeping.
35. Kes nange nahi rakhne – Do not leave your hair uncovered.
36. Singhaa da adhaa naam nahee bulaunaa – Address a Singh [or Kaur] by their entire name including Singh [or Kaur], do not shorten it by half or call them nicknames.
37. Sharaab nahi peeni-piauni – Do not drink or serve alcoholic beverages.
38. Sir munae noo kanaiaa nahee daenee. Uos ghar daeve jithae Akal Purukh dee sikhee ha, jo karza-ai naa hovae, bhalae subhaa da hovae, bibaekee atae gyanvaan hovae – Do not given a daughter's hand in marriage to a shaven one. Give her to a household where the Undying divine personification Akal Purakh and tenets of Sikhism are respected, to household without debt, of a pleasing nature, which is disciplined and educated.
39. Subh kaaraj Gurbanee anusaar karnae – Maintain all business affairs in accordance with scripture.
40. Chugalee kar kisae da kam nahee vigaarnaa – Do not defame anyone by gossiping about their business.
41. Kaurha bachan nahee kahinaa – Do not speak bitter words.
42. Darshan yaatraa gurdwaaraa dee hee karnee – Make pilgrimages only for seeing Gurdwaras.
43. Bachan karkae paalnaa – Keep all promises made.
44. Pardaesee, lorvaan, dukhee, apung manukh dee yataahshkat seva karnee – Do as much as possible to serve and aid foreigners, those in sadness, need, disability or trouble.
45. Dhee Putaree da dhan bikh Kar jananaa – Realize that taking the earnings of a daughter is poison [don't be greedy].
46. Dikhaavae da Sikh nahee banana – Do not act a Sikh outwardly only for show.
47. Sikhi kesaa-suaasa sang nibhaaounee – With every breath, live as a Sikh who has uncut hair. Know this kes to be equal to the Guru and give it the utmost respect.
48. Chori, yaari, tthugi, dhokaa, dagaa nahee karnaa – Abstain from thievery, adultery, cheating, deception, fraud, and pillaging.
49. Sikh da itbaar karnaa – Have confidence in a Sikh.
50. Jhutthi gavaahee nahee daenee – Do not make false testimonies.
51. Dhroh nahee karnaa – Do not participate in treason.
52. Langar Parshaad ik ras vartaaunaa – Serve langar [free community kitchen of a gurdwara] and prashad with impartiality.

== See also ==
- Sikh Rehat Maryada
