= Sikh rites =

The Sikhs engage in various rites and services. Sikh rites include activities they consider essential to the group practice of Sikhism or the expression of egalitarianism, such as kirtan or taking karah parshad. Many rites in Sikhism involve prayer (such as the Ardas) or reciting scripture (paath). Some Sikh rites are meant to be practiced in a gurdwara congregation, while others are practiced at home or in other contexts.

== Ardas ==
The Ardas is a formal prayer recited at the end of most Sikh rituals and at the end of morning and evening devotions. It consists of three parts: the first part invokes the ten Sikh gurus, the second part recalls trials and triumphs of the Sikh Panth, and the third part is a petition in which personal or panthic requests for intercession are often introduced. It ends with "Naanak naam charhdi kala, tayray bhaanay sarbat da bhala." Charhdi kala indicates a blissful state of mind and the absence of negative emotions. Sarbat da bhala indicates the well-being of all.

== Dasvandh ==
Dasvandh is the giving of one tenth (10%) of one's income as a tithe to help those less fortunate in the name of one's guru. This practice is derived from vand chhako, one of the three pillars of Sikhism. Sandeep Sahni writes, "The principle of Dasvandh is that if you give to the Infinite; Infinity, in turn, will give back to you." The practice of charitable giving was preached and spread by Guru Amar Das, Guru Ram Das, and Guru Arjan. In the past, such tithes were collected by Masands and then given to the Guru.

== Langar ==
A langar is a free community kitchen attached to a gurdwara where everyone sits on the floor and eats together regardless of differing backgrounds. This gathering is called a pangat. The langar was introduced by Guru Nanak to break the caste system that was prevalent in India during his life. The food served at a langar is always vegetarian and usually includes dal soup, vegetables, rice, and chapatis.

== Paath ==
Paath is the recitation of Gurbani, in various formats.

Akhand Paath is the uninterrupted recitation of the entire Guru Granth Sahib over a certain period, usually forty-eight hours. A number of reciters (paathis) take turns reading in two-hour shifts to accomplish this. Often, Akhand Paath is performed to mark an important religious or family event. It may also be performed as part of a gurdwara's regular services, so that visitors can listen to Gurbani at any time. The paathi is required to be an Amritdhari Sikh who endeavors to pronounce every syllable correctly, in a melodious voice, so that the Naad (sound current) may be produced and affect the consciousness of the paathi and those listening.

Sadharan Paath is similar to Akhand Paath, but it may be done intermittently over any time period, such as a month or two. It is commonly practiced at home, to be completed on the day of an anticipated family event or memorial.

Nitnem Paath is the thrice-daily recitation of certain compositions in the Sikh Rehat Maryada.

== Karah parshad ==
Karah parshad is a pudding-like sweet served in a gurdwara at the end of a worship service or act of worship. It is made from equal parts of flour, sugar, and ghee mixed in an iron bowl, and it is then heated before being taken to the diwan hall. Before being served, it is blessed by the recitation of the Ardas and the first five and last stanzas of Anand Sahib, and as the Ardas concludes, the karah parshad is pierced by a ceremonial sword called a kirpan to symbolically strengthen it.

Like the langar, the karah parshad is used to demonstrate belief in human equality. If someone does not accept the invitation to eat with them, Sikhs may interpret the refusal as a sign of disbelief in this principle.

== Kirtan ==
Kirtan means devotional singing. In Sikhism, kirtan is considered an essential element of religious practice and is often performed in a gurdwara congregation. In a gurdwara, kirtan is usually performed by professional musicians in a trio called a rāgī jathā. The trio includes a tabla player and two vocalists who also play harmoniums. In shabad kirtan, sacred songs from Sikh scriptures are sung or listened to. In nagar kirtan, the Guru Granth Sahib is carried in an outdoor procession.

== Samskars ==
In Sikhism, there are four samskars (rites of passage). Each samskar is associated with a ceremony that facilitates a key event in a Sikh's life. The first is the naming ceremony, performed in a gurdwara, where someone opens the Granth to a random page and selects the first letter found on the left to be the first letter of the child's name. The second is the baptism ceremony, in which a person receives holy water (amrit or "nectar") and is initiated into the Khalsa. The third is the marriage ceremony, in which the bride and groom walk slowly around the Granth while a priest reads hymns. The fourth is the death ceremony. Customarily, the body of the deceased is cremated during a funeral service defined by the Sikh Code of Conduct.

== Reverence for the Guru Granth Sahib ==
According to scholar Graham Harvey, Sikh worship largely revolves around the Guru Granth Sahib – reading it, hearing it, singing it, or being in its presence. Sikhs venerate the Granth and enshrine it by placing it on quilted mats, supporting it with cushions, and draping it in cloth called rumala, with a canopy overhead. While in its presence, they remove their shoes and cover their heads, and they wave a whisk over it as a sign of respect.
