= Akhand Path =

Sikh tradition of scripture recitation

An Akhand Path (Punjabi: ਅਖੰਡ ਪਾਠ, Punjabi pronunciation: [əkʰəɳɖᵊ paːʈʱ]) is the continuous and uninterrupted recitation of the Guru Granth Sahib, also known as Akhand Path Sahib.

== Purpose ==
The recital - (Path) is undertaken for various reasons. It can be in honour of a particular occasion; to mark a happy or sad occasion within the family; or simply to increase one’s feeling of connection to Waheguru. Some of following may call for an Akhand Path depending on the family's circumstances: a birth, a birthday, recovery from a medical operation, a wedding, a death, a graduation, on achieving a goal like a high school certificate, on passing the driving test, an anniversary, or a historic occasion.

== Procedure ==
The continuous nonstop recitation of all the verses in the Guru Granth Sahib from the beginning to the end, in 31 Ragas as specified, in all 1430 pages, lasts more than 48 hours by a team of readers.

Nearby, over a container of water a coconut is kept wrapped in saffron or white cloth, akin to the Hindu kalasha. A ghee lamp is also kept burning. This ritual is considered very holy and is said to bring peace and solace to the participants and the passive listeners of the recital. During the reading it is tradition for langar (or communal food) to be available at all times, thus requiring the continual service and dedication of those in whose honour the Akhand Path is being held.

Some Gurdwaras hold a weekly Akhand Path and this gives the congregation (Sadh Sangat) an opportunity to establish a close relationship with the Guru - the Granth and the communion that provides the chance to carry out volunteer work (Seva) thus obtaining the blessing of the Guru Granth Sahib for the whole of the communion.

It is said that when Guru Gobind Singh had completed the writing of the Guru Granth Sahib, he had five members of the congregation (Sadh Sangat) who chanted the completed Granth to him nonstop, for more than two days and nights. He stood there and listened to the entire Guru Granth Sahib without having any sleep whatsoever. People brought him water for his bath and for his meals where he stood. This was the first Akhand Path. The second Akhand Path was in Nanded after Guru Gobind Singh sent Banda Singh Bahadur to Punjab. The Akhand Pathees (reciters of the Granth) were Bhai Gurbaksh Singh, Baba Deep Singh, Bhai Dharam Singh (of Panj Piaray), Bhai Santokh Singh, and Bhai Hari Singh (who used to write the daily diary of Guru Gobind Singh). Before giving the Guruship to the Guru Granth Sahib the Guru held this Akhand Path and then proclaimed the Adi Granth as the perpetual Guru of the Sikhs.

Following this example, the Sikhs started the tradition of dedicating Akhand Paths to various activities. Before battles, the Khalsa army would listen to an Akhand Path and then prepare for battle. An Akhand Path was arranged before the Sikhs set out to rescue 18,000 indigenous women captured by the Moghuls and had taken them as slaves.

In 1742, when Sikhs were in the jungles of Punjab, one Sikh woman warrior named Bibi Sundari, requested just before she died (due to the wounds inflicted in battle) to have an Akhand Path arranged for her. She lay there next to the Guru Granth Sahib and listened to the full recitation of this Path. After kirtan, Ardas and Hukam, she received the Karah Prashad, uttered "Waheguru ji ka Khalsa, Waheguru ji ki Fateh" breathing her last. Thus began the tradition of rendering an Akhand Path within 48 hours.

If the Akhand Path is to be recited in Punjabi, then it must be completed within 48 hours, without recitation in 31 Ragas as specified. If it is to be done in English (as in the case for the Sikh diaspora), it will take more than 72 hours to complete.

During an Akhand Path, if a Hukam is taken at the end of a program, the Pathee (person reading the Path) reads the Gurbani that they have arrived at in the regular course of reading. They may slow down and read it clearly. In this case, the first and last two lines are not repeated. When the Pathee reaches the end of the Hukam, they continue in the reading of the Akhand Path.

Akhand Path is supposed to be read loudly, clearly, and correctly.

The reading concludes with a Bhog ceremony.

== History ==
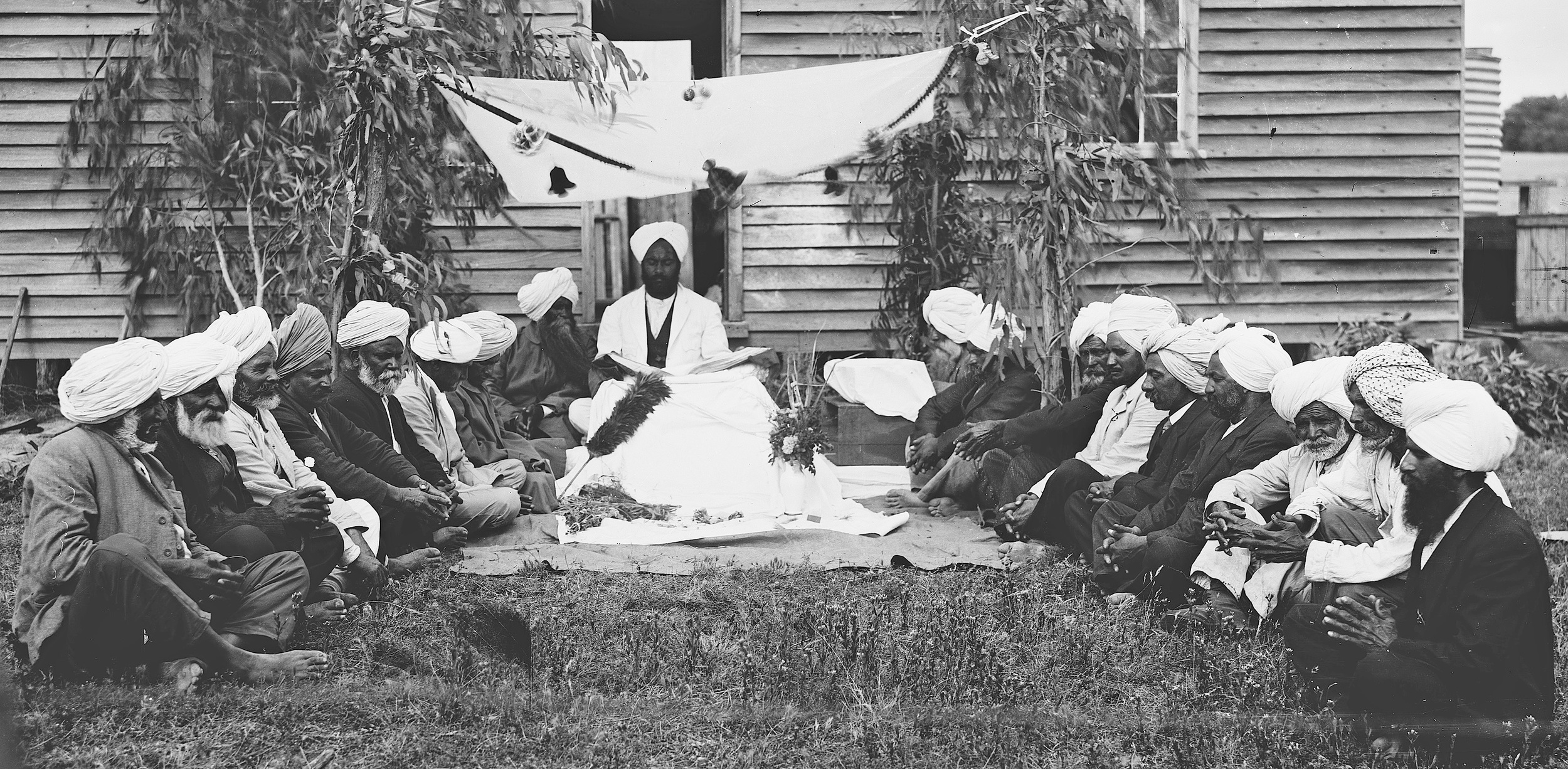
Photographs of the first confirmed Darbar and Akhand Pāth of the Guru Granth Sahib in Australia on the property of Siva Singh at Reef Hills, near Benalla, Australia, photographed by William John Howship, 16 December 1920

The practice of Akhand Paths likely began in the late 18th century, with evidence of it occurring from the 1790's, a time that is recorded as a turbulent period in Sikh history where it was used as a means of uplifting Sikhs. It may have originated from within the Budha Dal division of the Dal Khalsa of the Sikh Confederacy and popularized by the Nirmala and Udasi sects from there. Its popularity increased during the 19th century, when mass-produced printed copies of the Guru Granth Sahib became available to the masses.

A permanent monument dedicated to Siva Singh was unveiled by Councillor Don Firth past Mayor of Benalla, on the Lake Benalla foreshore on Saturday the 23 November 2019. The memorial features the historic 1920 photograph of the Akhand Path congregation, which came to light through historical research conducted by Len Kenna and Crystal Jordan of the Australian Indian Historical Society. The original image had been preserved on a glass plate as part of the 1,200 images of the William John Howship Collection via collaboration between the Benalla Family Research Group and the University of Melbourne.

== Variants ==
There are several variants of the Akhand Path, such as the Ati Akhand Path, which involves one person continuously reciting the scripture non-stop without breaking for any reason, usually completed in around 27 hours. This variant is rarely performed and requires a reader of high stamina and reading ability.

== See also ==
- Paath
- Sadharan Path
