= Antam Sanskar =

Last rites in Sikhism

Antam Sanskar (Gurmukhi: ਅੰਤਮ ਸੰਸਕਾਰ atama sasakāra) refers to the funeral rites in Sikhism. Antam (or Antim) means "final", while sanskar means "rite". There are three major components of a Sikh funeral: the crematorium, the gurdwara ceremony, and the scattering of the ashes. There are variations of these three components regarding timing depending on region and family, as traditions may vary. However, cremations in Indian culture usually occur within one or two days after a death but can be delayed to await the arrival of distant mourners to the ceremony. After the cremation, a religious ceremony is carried-out by the family of the dead, involving a reading of the Guru Granth Sahib, known as a Sehaj Pāth.

In Sikhism, death is considered a natural process and God's will or Hukam. To a Sikh, birth and death are closely associated, because they are both part of the cycle of human life of "coming and going" ( ਆਵਣੁ ਜਾਣਾ, Aaavan Jaanaa) which is seen as transient stage towards Liberation ( ਮੋਖੁ ਦੁਆਰੁ, Mokh Du-aar), complete unity with God. Sikhs thus believe in reincarnation. The soul itself is not subject to death. Death is only the progression of the soul on its journey from God, through the created universe and back to God again. In life, a Sikh tries always to constantly remember death so that they may be sufficiently prayerful, detached and righteous to break the cycle of birth and death and return to God. At a funeral, Sikhs are expected to keep in-composure and celebrate the deceased individual rather than mourn their death.

Cremation is the preferred method of disposal, although if it is not possible any other methods or if the person willed to be buried then burial or submergence at sea are acceptable. A memorial to the dead, gravestone, mausoleum etc. is not allowed, because the body is considered to be only the shell, the person's soul was their real essence.

== Before death ==
At a Sikh's death-bed, relatives and friends should read Sukhmani Sahib, the Prayer of Peace, composed by the fifth Guru Arjan Dev, or simply recite "Waheguru" to console themselves and the dying person. When a death occurs, they should exclaim "Waheguru, Waheguru, Waheguru" (the Wonderful Lord).

If the death occurs in a hospital, the body is taken to the funeral parlor or home before the funeral. In preparation for cremation (usually the day before or day of the cremation), the body is first wāed while those present recite the Gurmantar Waheguru or Mool Mantar. Then the body is dressed with clean clothes complete with the Five Ks (in the case of Amritdhari Sikhs).

== Funeral ==
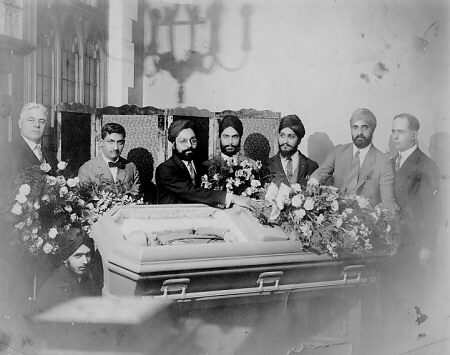
Sikhs at a funeral. Photographed 1920s, United States

The funeral of a deceased Sikh should take place quickly, usually in the afternoon if the death happened in the morning or on the day after. Prayers occur during the funerary ceremony and thus, those in-attendance must cover their heard. Of the two prayers that are always performed at Sikh funerals, the first prayer is the Ardās whilst the second prayer performed is the Kirtan Sohila. The Ardās, a supplicatory prayer, is performed to mark the beginning and end of major life milestones in Sikhism, such as a birth, marriage, or death, and it is performed to assist grieving individuals to move on and accept the passing by instilling strength in them. The Kirtan Sohila is performed to remind all to accept death as the ultimate truth. Sikh funerals tend to be public events (unless the mourning family specifies otherwise). Thus, the family, relatives, friends, acquaintances, and others are usually welcomed to attend.

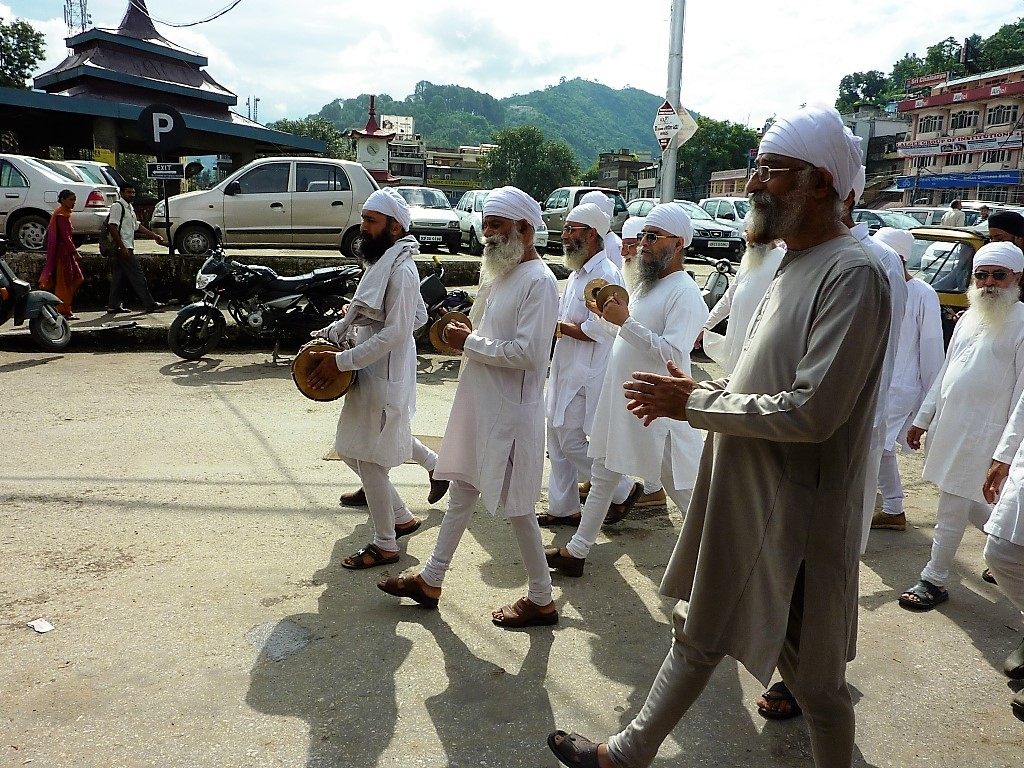
Namdhari Sikh funeral procession in Mandi, Himachel Pradesh, India

Whilst there is no outright religious rule regarding clothing colour, Sikhs traditionally wear white at-funerals. Some diasporic Sikhs, such as in North America, have adopted the Western custom of wearing black at funerals.

== Cremation ==
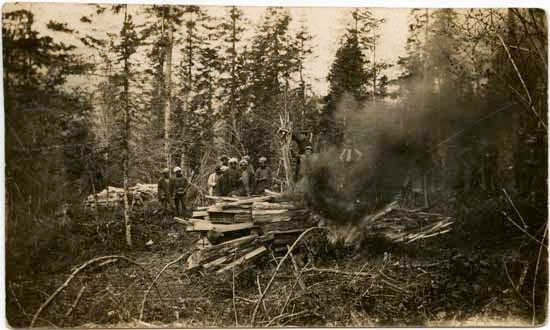
Photograph of the Sikh cremation of the deceased Tar Gool Singh at Vancouver Portland Cement Co. works, taken by Bonnycastle Dale, British Columbia, Canada, 12 April 1907

Guidelines for Sikh cremation practices are laid-out in the Sikh Rehat Maryada. Sikhs generally practice cremation, however they may bury their dead in emergency situations. Prior to cremation, the remains are washed and dressed in fresh clothing. The body of an Amritdhari Sikh must be adorned with all five Ks during the cremation.

On the day of the cremation, the body is taken to the Gurdwara or home where Shabads (hymns) from the Guru Granth Sahib, the Sikh Scriptures, are recited by the congregation, which induce feeling of consolation and courage. Kirtan may also be performed by Ragis while the relatives of the deceased recite "Waheguru". This service normally takes from 30 to 60 minutes. At the conclusion of the service, an Ardas is said before the body is taken to the cremation site.

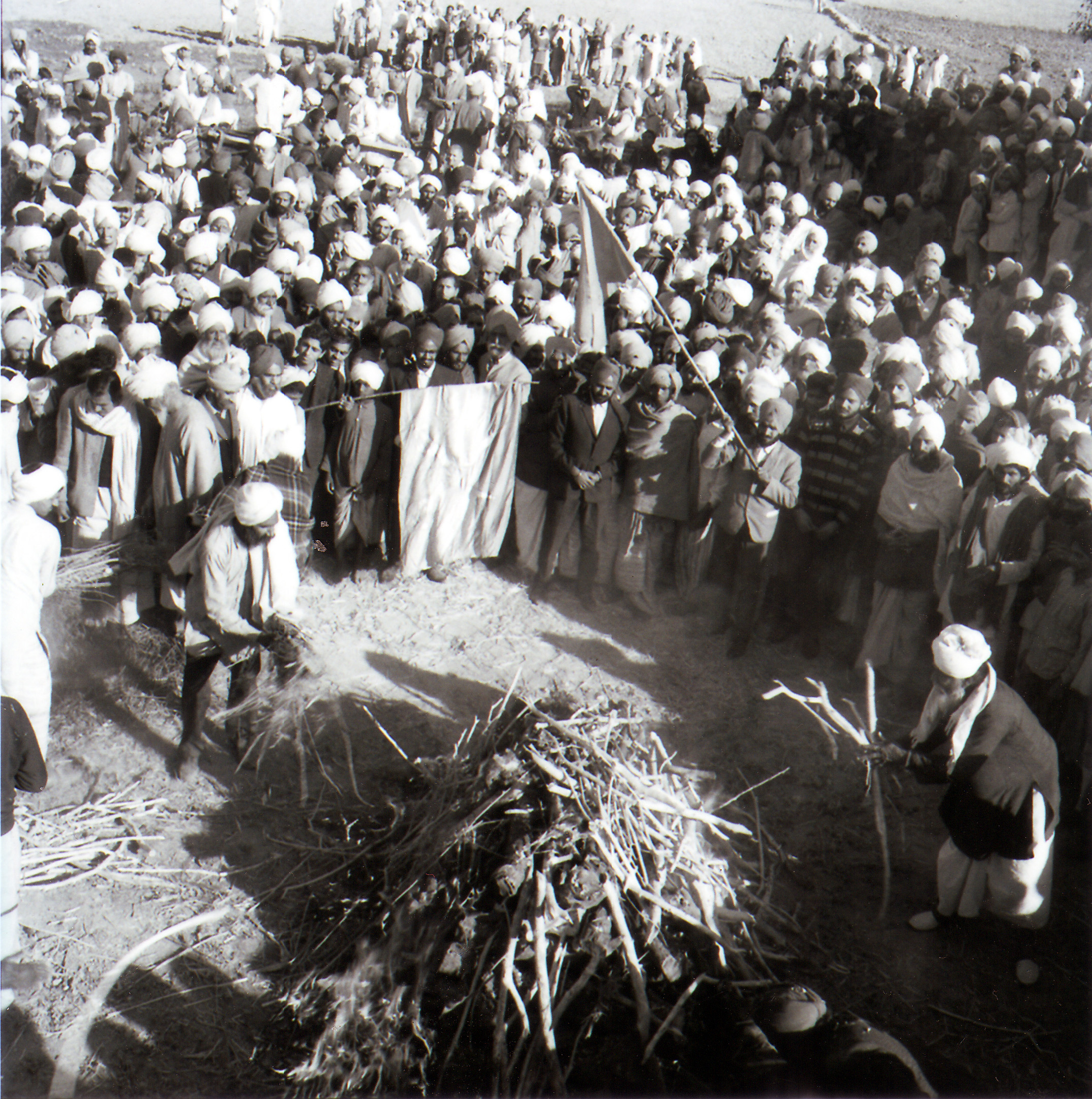
Cremation of Sohan Singh Bhakna, 21 December 1968

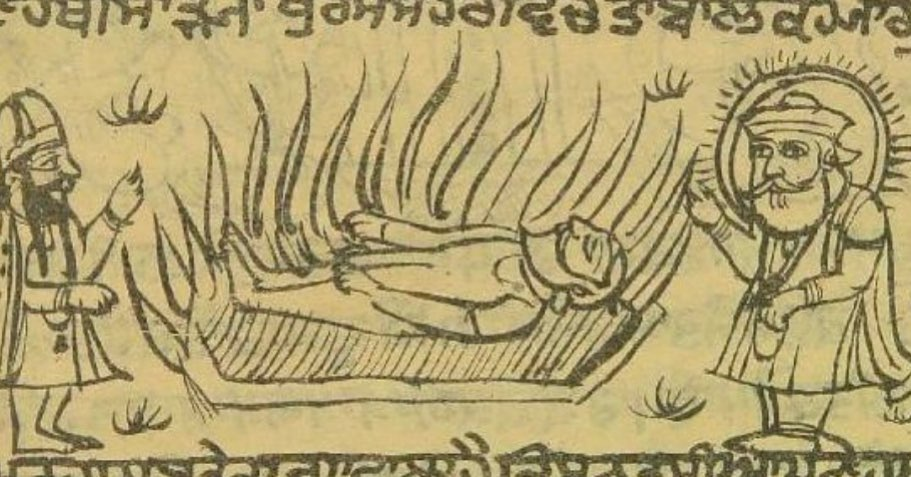
Artwork from a folio of a Janamsakhi manuscript depicting the funeral of Bhai Mardana, who is being cremated in the presence of Guru Nanak and Bhai Bala, lithograph, circa 19th century

At the point of cremation, a few Shabads are sung and final speeches are made about the deceased person. Then the Kirtan Sohila (night time prayer) is recited and finally Ardas called the "Antim Ardas" ("Final Prayer") is offered. The eldest son or a close relative generally starts the cremation process – by lighting the fire or pressing the button for the burning to begin. This service usually lasts about 30 to 60 minutes.

The ashes are later collected and immersed in a body of water. Sikhs do not erect monuments over the remains of the dead.

After the cremation ceremony, there may be another service at the Gurdwara, the Sikh place of worship, called the Sahaj Paath Bhog Ceremony.

== Sehaj Pāth ==
After the death of a Sikh, the family of the deceased may undertake a non-continuous reading of the entire Guru Granth Sahib (known as a Sahaj Paath), known as a Sahaj Paath Bhog ceremony. The ceremony is performed by a granthi or any learned-man. This reading (paath) is timed to conclude within ten days after the funeral. The reading may be undertaken at home or in the Gurdwara and usually takes place on the day of the cremation. The conclusion of this ceremony called the Bhog Ceremony marks the end of the mourning period.

Generally, all the relatives and friends of the family gather together for the Bhog ceremony on the completion of the reading of Guru Granth Sahib. Musicians sing appropriate Shabad hymns, Saloks of the ninth Guru Tegh Bahadur are read, and Ramkali Saad, the Call of God, is recited. After the final prayer, a selected reading or Hukam is taken, and Karah Parshad is distributed to the congregation. Normally food from the Guru's kitchen, Langar, is also served.

== Dispersal of ashes ==
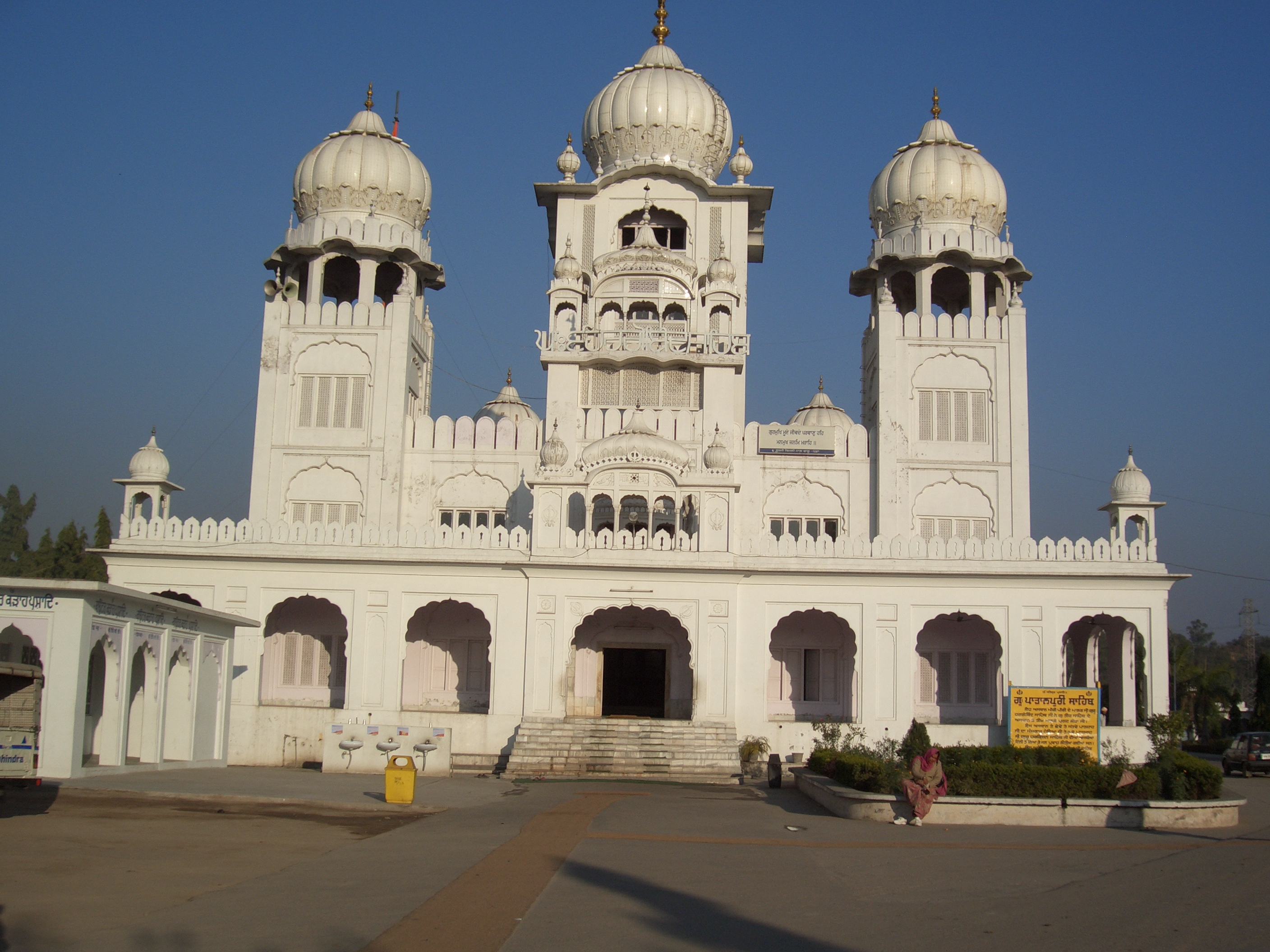
Gurdwara Patalpuri Sahib in Kiratpur, Punjab, India. Whilst not religiously mandated, it has become customary for many Sikhs to dispose of their loved-ones' ashes at this location into the Sutlej.

After the completion of the sehaj pāth, the ashes of the deceased are taken to a flowing body of water to be dispersed by close family. If it is not possible to disperse the ashes in flowing water, then they may be buried. There is no religious requirement for the ashes to be dispersed at any particular location or site, but it has become a popular tradition amongst Sikhs to disperse them at Kiratpur into the Sutlej river, specifically at Gurdwara Patalpuri Sahib. However, Sikhs can disperse the ashes in any flowing body of water and there are no restrictions on which flowing body of water the ashes must be dispersed in or where it must occur. Historically, many Sikhs traditionally used to disperse the ashes of the deceased at Haridwar, where genealogical records were maintained, however going to this specific site fell out of favour with many Sikhs, as Sikhism does not encourage or emphasize any particular place. Keeping the ashes in a specific place and memorializing them is forbidden in Sikhism, as Sikhs are supposed to let-go of emotional attachment to the dead and focus on the present rather than the past.

Whilst Hindus generally immerse the ashes of their departed into the Ganges river, in cities such as in Haridwar, which is performed by the closest male-relative, Sikhs on the other-hand generally immerse the ashes of their deceased family into the Sutlej river at Kiratpur. As per Sikh hagiographical accounts, Guru Amar Das convinced the Mughal emperor Akbar to relinquish the pilgrimage tax on Hindus travelling to Haridwar.
