= Sevā =

Selfless service and volunteering in Indian religions

Sevā (also known as Sewā, Sanskrit: सेवा) is the concept of performing selfless service without any expectation of reward. It exists in Hinduism, Jainism and Sikhism, taking also the form of Bhandara in Hinduism and Langar in Sikhism. In Jainism, service is regarded as an internal discipline that cultivates humility, detachment, and moral refinement rather than personal merit or reward. Sevā is a Sanskrit term meaning "selfless and meaningful service". Such acts are carried out to benefit other human beings or society; however, a modern interpretation of the term describes it as a service that reflects "dedication to others". Because of India's many faiths having cultural overlap, the concept of seva also manifests in South Asian Islam and Christianity, and aligns with the concept of mitzvah in Judaism.

== Etymology and meaning ==
Sevā comes from the Sanskrit root sev—"to serve".

Kar sevā (Gurmukhi: ਕਰ ਸੇਵਾ), from the Sanskrit words kar, meaning hands or work, and sevā, meaning service, is often translated as "voluntary service". A kar sevā volunteer is called a kar sevak: someone who freely offers their services to a religious cause. Sikhs use the term kar sevak to refer to people who engage in ministrations, altruistic philanthropy, and humanitarian endeavors in service to religion and society. Sevadar (Punjabi: ਸੇਵਾਦਾਰ; also transcribed as sewadar), literally "sevā-supporter", is another Punjabi word for a volunteer who performs seva.

== Sevā in Hinduism ==
In Hinduism, sevā is the concept of service to God and/or humanity, performed without any expectation of personal gain. Sevā is seen as a form of dharma (righteousness) and has been said to provide good karma, which helps the atma (soul) to obtain moksha (emancipation from the cycle of death and rebirth).

Sevā is also connected to other Sanskrit concepts, such as dāna (gift giving), karunā (compassion), and prema (love/affection). Seva is also performed as a form of ego-transcending spiritual practice known as sādhanā and plays a significant role in modern Hinduism. A key concept in Hinduism is moksha, or liberation from the cycle of births and death known as saṃsāra. Sādhanā is the effort one makes to strive for liberation, highlighting the importance of service to others.

=== Historical Context ===
Before the early 19th century, the meaning of sevā (serving or honoring) had been virtually synonymous with puja (worship), which typically also included distribution of prasad (sacrificial offerings), such as food, fruits, and sweets to all gathered. Thus, sevā typically involved the offering of food to a deity and its murti (idol), followed by the distribution of that food as prasad.

== Sevā in Jainism ==
In Jainism, sevā is understood as an ethical expression of compassion, non-violence (ahiṃsā), and the mutual interdependence of all living beings. Sevā in Jain thought is embedded within a comprehensive moral and metaphysical framework aimed at the purification of the soul (jīva) and the minimisation of karmic bondage.

A foundational Jain formulation relevant to sevā is the aphorism parasparopagraho jīvānām (“souls render service to one another”), found in Tattvārtha Sūtra (5.21).

Acts of service are assessed not only by intention but also by their effects, with careful attention to avoidance and prevention of any harm to anyone. Jain ethical texts state that compassion should be exercised in ways that minimise injury to even the smallest living beings. In classical Jain literature, service is associated with vaiyāvṛttya, a form of ethical conduct involving respectful service rendered to others, particularly spiritual teachers, ascetics, the sick, and fellow practitioners. Sevā, when practised in accordance with restraint and right perception, contributes indirectly to spiritual progress by reducing egoism and reinforcing awareness of interdependence.

=== Modern Context ===
In modern contexts, Jain communities have extended the principle of sevā to organised humanitarian, educational, environmental, and animal-protection initiatives. Jains express sevā through ethical engagement with society and sustained support of the Jain community (saṅgha). In this way, sevā functions as a bridge between ideals and their actual implementation in everyday life. Among Jain households, sevā traditionally includes acts such as providing alms, supporting ascetics, offering care to the poor and infirm, maintaining places of worship, and protecting animals. Animal welfare, in particular, occupies a prominent place in Jain service activities.

== Sevā in Sikhism ==
Sevā is one of the principle pillars of the Sikh faith. In Sikhism, sevā is an act of service to Waheguru (the Supreme God), enabling one to grow closer to Waheguru. The principles of sevā underpin many Sikh values and are emphasized numerous times in the Guru Granth Sahib. The scripture focuses not only on how one should perform sevā, but also on the proper mindset one should have and the spiritual benefits that result from performing sevā. Sevā denotes selfless service and civic virtue in the organization and in society. In Sikhism, Sevā is defined as voluntary service without expectation of anything in return and for the welfare of others. There are many different types of Sevā which are the following: Sevā rendered through one's body (tan), Sevā rendered through one's mind (man), Sevā rendered through one's wealth (dan). Even though all three modes are equally important, the Sikh Gurus emphasize that all Sevā should be performed without desire (nishkam), without intentions (nishkapat), and with humility (nimarta).

In Sikhism, the word sevā means "to worship, adore, or pay homage through the act of love." Sevā could be social, physical, spiritual, or a security service for the welfare of humanity. In the writings of Sikh gurus, these two meanings of sevā (service and worship) have been merged. Sevā is expected to be a labor of love performed with humility and without selfish desire or expectation.

Sevā in Sikhism takes three forms: tan (Gurmukhi: ਤਨ), meaning physical service, i.e., manual labour, man (Gurmukhi: ਮਨ), meaning mental service, such as studying to help others, and dhan (Gurmukhi: ਧਨ), meaning material service, including financial support. Sikhism stresses kirat karō (Gurmukhi: ਕਿਰਤ ਕਰੋ), "honest work", and vaṇḍ chakkō (Gurmukhi: ਵੰਡ ਛਕੋ), "split up", sharing what you have by giving to the needy for the benefit of the community. It is a duty of every Sikh to engage in sevā wherever possible, such as volunteering at a Gurdwara, community center, senior living center, care center, a disaster site, etc. Sevā can also be performed by offering service for a religious cause, such as constructing a gurdwara, a place of worship that performs community services, such as providing volunteer-run food kitchens.

Kar sevā is one of the main teachings of Sikhism—including its ordained philosophy, in Sikh scripture, theology, and hermeneutics. A tradition set forth with the clear understanding that there is "God within all of us, and thus by serving humanity, you are serving God's creation." Sevā is believed to be a way to control inner vices and is a key process in becoming closer to God.

=== Criticism ===
Kar Sewa appeal for the construction of the clock tower gateway entrance to the Golden Temple, Amritsar, Punjab, c. 1951

Some kar sevā groups and organizations have been criticized for their lack of care for and apathy towards preserving Sikh historical sites, artwork, and architecture during renovation and construction projects. Numerous historical Sikh scriptural manuscripts have been systematically "cremated" (burnt to destruction) over the years at secretive ‘Angitha Sahib’ gurdwaras in Dehradun and around India as part of kar sevā. The logic behind these crematoriums is the Sikh philosophy handed down by the tenth Guru Gobind Singh that Guru Granth Sahib is the living embodiment of a Guru, and so Sikh funeral rites are carried out. This practice is heavily criticized for systematically destroying historical manuscripts.

== Concept in Islam ==
The concept of Sewa or selfless service finds resonance in Islam through several key principles emphasizing service to others and social responsibility. While the term "Sewa" is of South Asian origin, the spirit of altruistic service aligns with Islamic teachings.

In an Islamic context, the concept of selfless service closely aligns with core teachings that emphasize charity, social responsibility, and helping those in need. Islam encourages acts of kindness and community service through practices such as Khidmah (serving others), Sadaqah (voluntary charity), and Zakat (obligatory almsgiving).

=== Khidmah (Service) ===
Khidmah refers to service performed for the benefit of others, motivated by sincerity and devotion to God. Acts of service—whether assisting family, community, or the needy—are considered a form of worship. The Islamic prophet Muhammad emphasized the virtue of serving others, stating: "The best of people are those who are most beneficial to others."

=== Ṣadaqah (Voluntary Charity) ===
Sadaqah is voluntary charity given out of compassion or religious duty. Unlike obligatory alms, it can be offered at any time and in any amount. Ṣadaqah purifies wealth, promotes community solidarity, and benefits both the giver and recipient. The Quran states: "The example of those who spend their wealth in the way of Allah is like that of a grain of corn which sprouts seven ears, and in each ear there are a hundred grains." (Quran 2:261)

=== Zakāt (Obligatory Almsgiving) ===
Zakāt is one of the Five Pillars of Islam and requires Muslims to give a fixed portion (usually 2.5%) of accumulated wealth annually to the poor and needy. It serves both as a purification of wealth and a means to reduce economic inequality within the community. The Quran mentions: "Take from their wealth a charity by which you purify them and cause them increase..." (Quran 9:103)

== Service in Christianity ==
For those participating in it, sevā is an essential component of spiritual development, serving to reduce the egotism and selfishness associated with modernity.

== See also ==
- Sewapanthi
- Community service in different religions:
  - Bhandara (community kitchen)
  - Dakshina
  - Punya (Hinduism)
  - Sadaqah (Islam)
  - Tikkun olam ('repairing of the world' concept in Judaism)
  - Joyous Life, concept in Tenrikyo
