= Gurdwara =

Place of worship in Sikhism

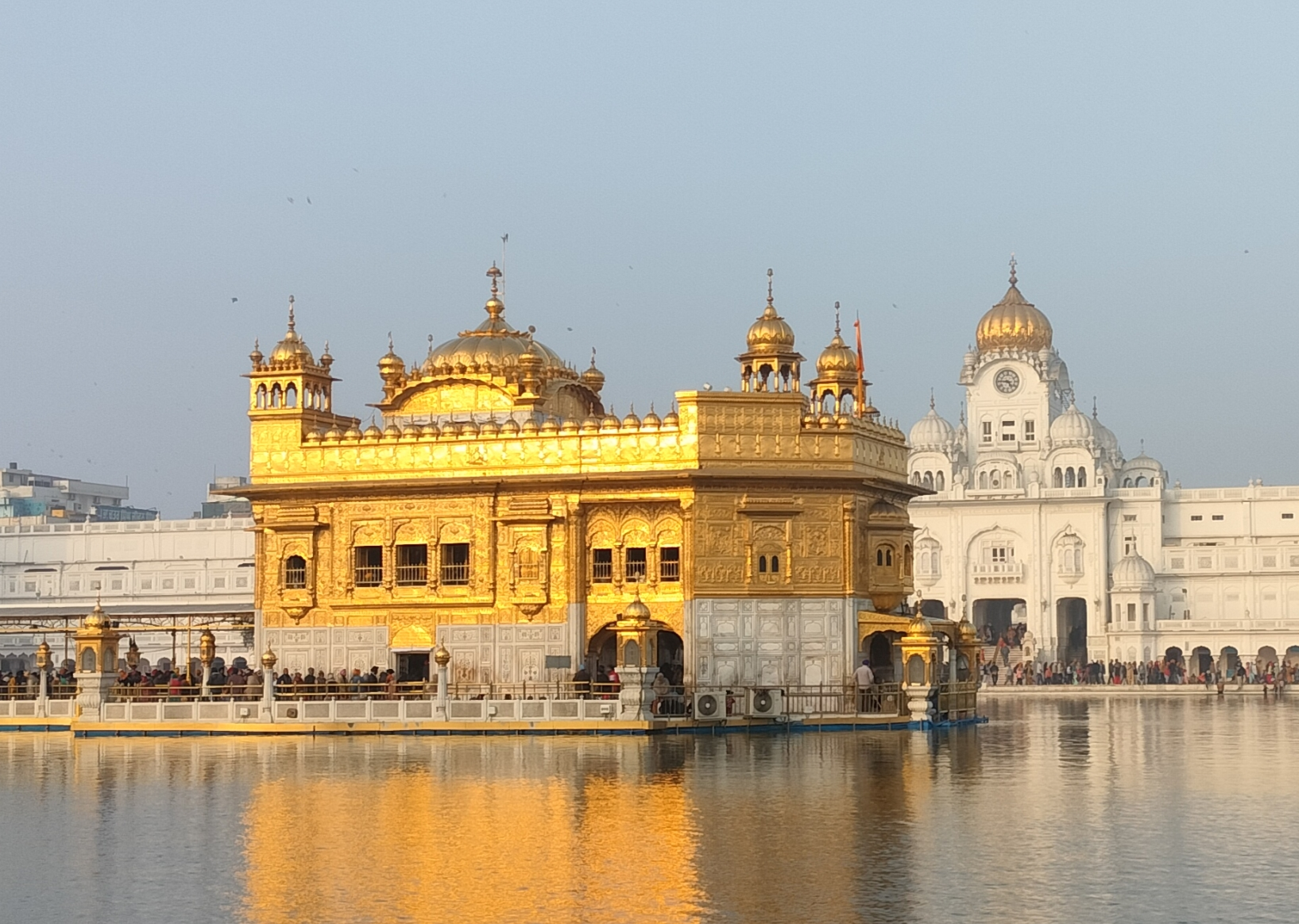
Golden Temple in Amritsar, Punjab, India

A gurdwara, gurudwara, or gurudwar (Punjabi: ਗੁਰਦੁਆਰਾ, romanized: gurdu'ārā, lit. 'door of the guru') is a place of assembly and worship in Sikhism, but its normal meaning is "place of guru" or "home of guru". Sikhs also refer to gurdwaras as Gurdwara Sahib. People from all faiths and religions are welcomed in a gurdwara. Each gurdwara has a Darbar Sahib where the Guru Granth Sahib is placed on a takht (an elevated throne) in a prominent central position. Any congregant (sometimes with specialized training, in which case they are known by the term granthi) may recite, sing, and explain the verses from the Guru Granth Sahib, in the presence of the rest of the congregation.

All gurdwaras have a langar hall, where people can eat free lacto-vegetarian food served by volunteers at the gurdwara. They may also have a medical facility room, library, nursery, classroom, meeting rooms, playground, sports ground, a gift shop, and finally a repair shop. A gurdwara can be identified from a distance by tall flagpoles bearing the Nishan Sahib, the Sikh flag.

The best-known gurdwaras are in the Darbar Sahib complex in Amritsar, Punjab, including Golden Temple (Sri Harmandir Sahib), the spiritual center of the Sikhs and Akal Takht, the political center of the Sikhs.

== Description ==
A gurdwara has a main hall called a darbar, a community kitchen called a langar, and other facilities. The essential features of a gurdwara are these public spaces, the presence of the holy book and eternal Sikh guru the Granth Sahib, the pursuit of the Sikh Rehat Maryada (the Sikh code of conduct and convention), and the provision of daily services:

- Shabad kirtan: singing hymns from the Guru Granth Sahib. Strictly speaking only Shabads from Guru Granth Sahib, Dasam Granth, and the compositions of Bhai Gurdas and Bhai Nand Lal, can be performed within a gurdwara.
- Paath: religious discourse and reading of Gurbani from the Guru Granth Sahib, with its explanations. There are two types of discourse: Akhand Paath and Sadharan Paath.
- Sangat and pangat: providing a free community kitchen called a langar for all visitors, regardless of cultural, religious, regional, caste, or class affiliations.

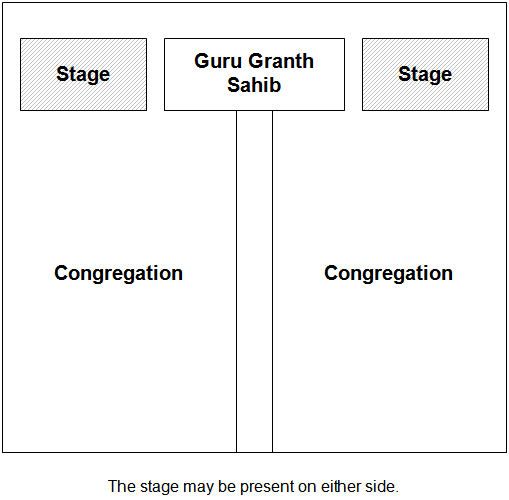
A typical Darbar Sahib layout. Men and women usually sit on separate sides.

Other ceremonies performed there include the Sikh marriage ceremony, Anand Karaj; some of the rites of the death ceremony, Antam Sanskar; and most of the important Sikh Festivals. The Nagar Kirtan, a Sikh processional singing of holy hymns throughout a community, begin and conclude at a gurdwara.

Gurdwaras around the world may also serve the Sikh community in other ways, including acting as libraries of Sikh literature and schools to teach children Gurmukhi, housing the Sikh scriptures, and organizing charitable work in the wider community on behalf of Sikhs. Many historical gurdwaras associated with the lives of the Sikh Gurus have a sarovar (eco-friendly pool) attached for bathing.

Gurdwaras have no idols or statues.

=== Customs ===
Instructional video on what to expect on a visit to a Sikh Gurdwara, by Sikh Dharma International.

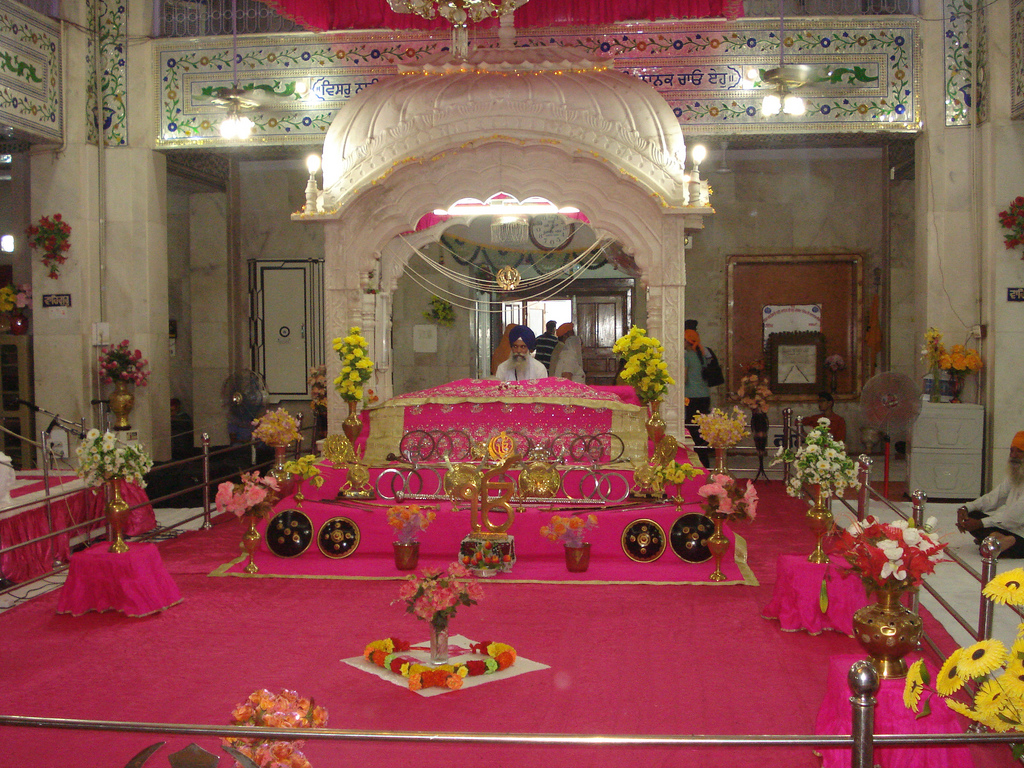
Gurudwara Paonta Sahib, view inside a typical gurdwara.

Many gurdwaras are designed to seat men on one side and women on the other, although designs vary, and the divided seating is far from mandatory. They do not generally sit together but on separate sides of the room, both at an equal distance from the Guru Granth Sahib, as a sign of equality. Worshippers are offered Karah Parshad (sweet flour and ghee-based food offered as prashad) in the hall, which is usually given into cupped hands by a sewadar (gurdwara volunteer).

In the langar room, food is cooked and served by the volunteers in the community. Only lacto-vegetarian food is served in the langar hall, to suit the visitors from different backgrounds so that no person may be offended. All people belonging to different faiths sit together to share a common meal, regardless of any dietary restrictions. The main philosophy behind the langar is two-fold: to provide training to engage in seva and an opportunity to serve people from all walks of life, and to help banish all distinctions between high and low or rich and poor.

=== Architecture ===
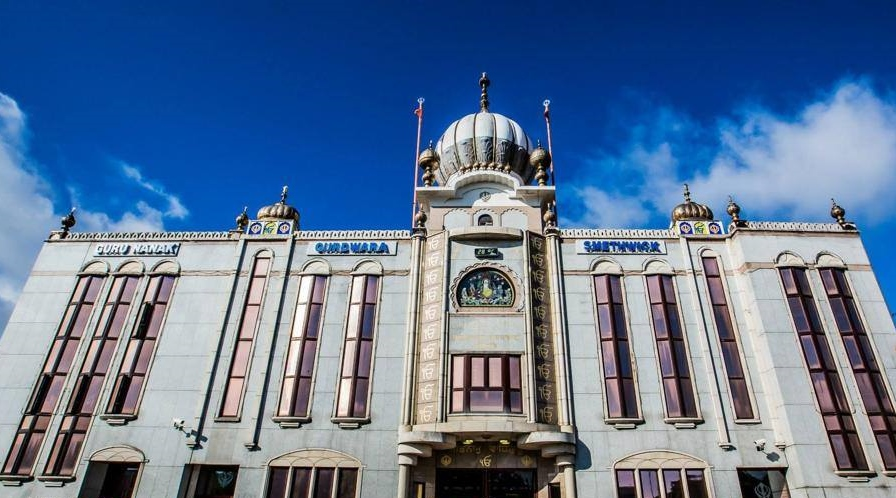
Guru Nanak Gurdwara Smethwick in Sandwell, one of the first and largest gurdwaras in the UK.

Gurdwara buildings do not have to conform to any set architectural design. The only established requirements are: the installation of the Guru Granth Sahib under a canopy or in a canopied seat, usually on a platform higher than the specific floor on which the devotees sit, and a tall Sikh pennant flag atop the building.

In the 21st century, more and more gurdwaras (especially within India) have been following the Harimandir Sahib pattern, a synthesis of Indo-Islamic and Sikh architecture. Most of them have square halls, stand on a higher plinth, have entrances on all four sides, and have square or octagonal domed sanctums usually in the middle. During recent decades, to meet the requirements of larger gatherings, bigger and better ventilated assembly halls, with the sanctum at one end, have become accepted style. The location of the sanctum, more often than not, is such as to allow space for circumambulation. Sometimes, to augment the space, verandahs are built to skirt the hall. A popular model for the dome is the ribbed lotus, topped by an ornamental pinnacle. Arched copings, kiosks and solid domelets are used for exterior decorations.

== Spiritual significance ==
=== Meditating by the Guru Granth Sahib ===
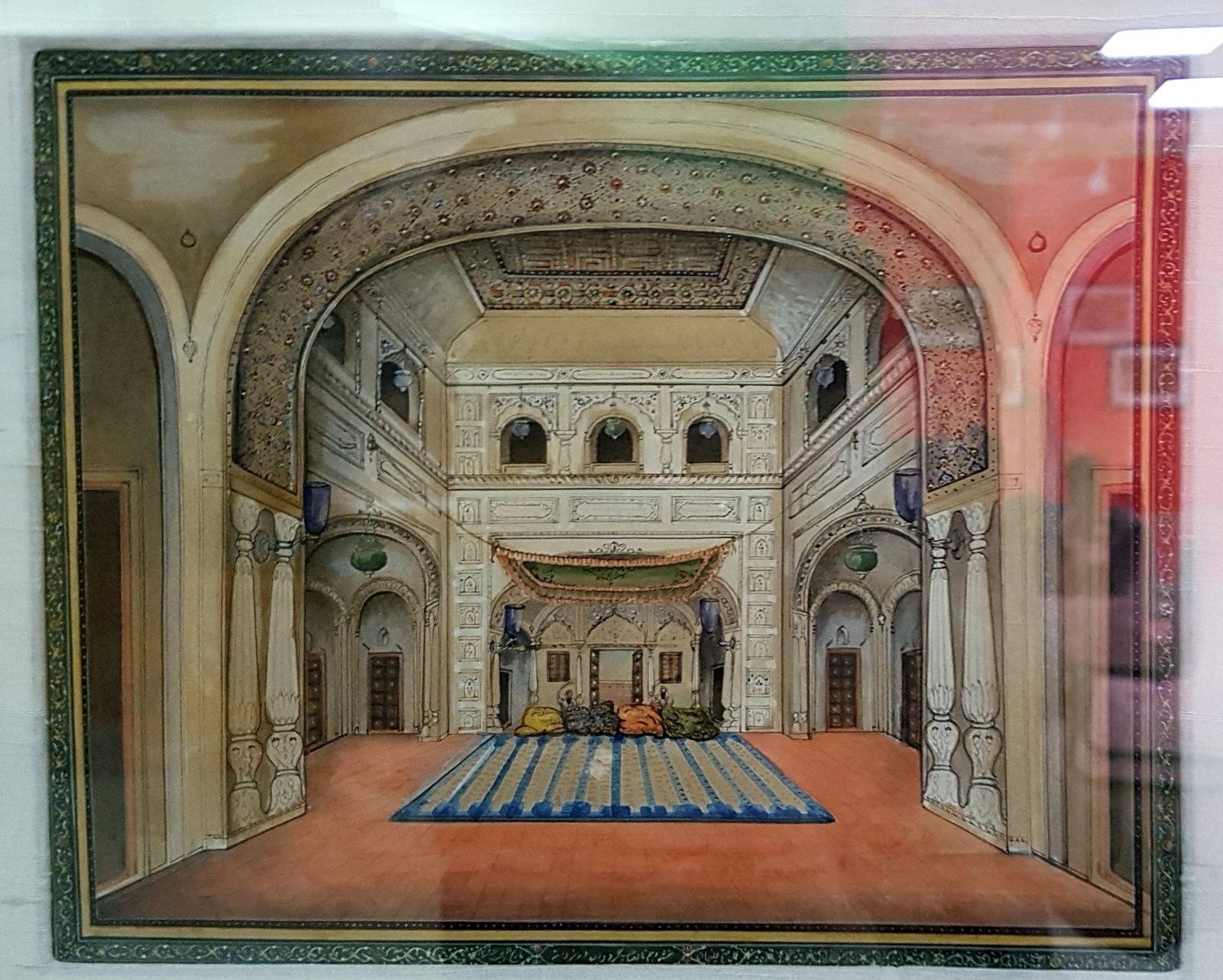
Painting of the interior of a gurdwara, Punjab, ca.1875

It is the duty of all Sikhs to engage in personal and communal meditation, kirtan and the study of the holy scriptures. Meditating and understanding the meaning of texts from the Granth Sahib is important for the proper moral and spiritual development of a Sikh. One must study Gurmukhi script and be able to read Gurbani to understand the meaning of the text. A Sikh has to revert to the Granth Sahib for the all spiritual guidance in one's life.

=== Holy congregation and reflecting on Gurbani ===
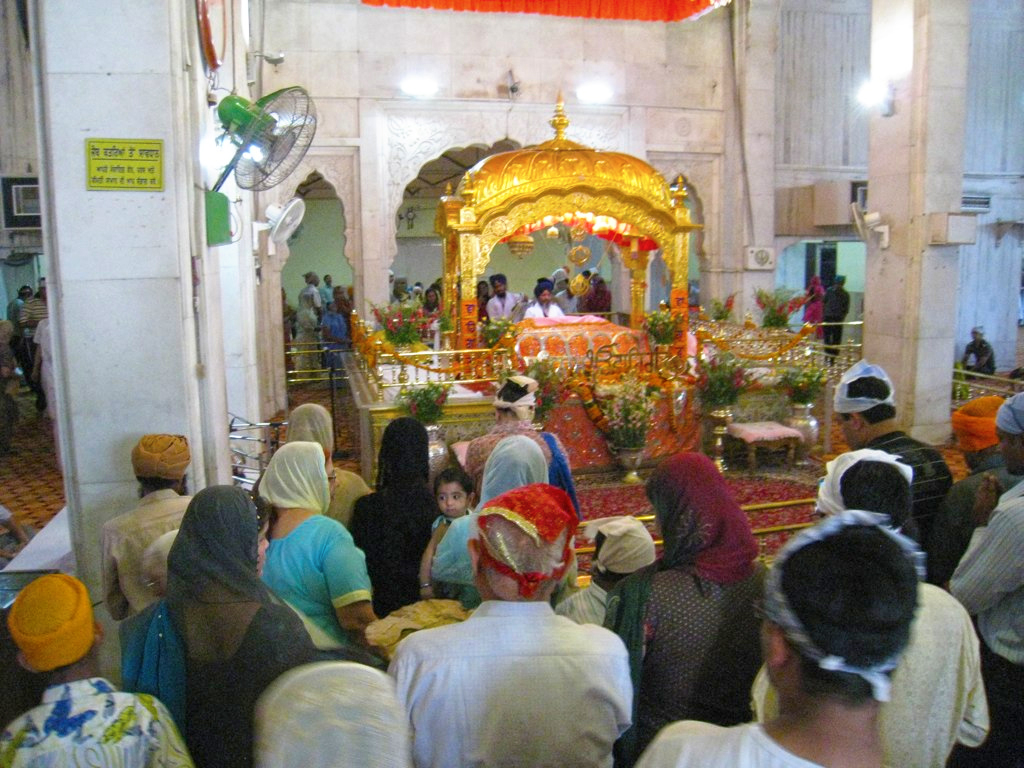
The Darbar Sahib of a gurdwara.

It is believed that a Sikh is more easily and deeply engrossed by Gurbani when engaged in congregation gatherings. For this reason, it is necessary for a Sikh to visit gurdwara. On joining the holy congregation, Sikhs should take part and obtain the benefit from the combined study of the holy scriptures. No one is to be barred from entering a gurdwara regardless of their religious or regional background and are welcomed in.

=== Voluntary service (Seva) ===
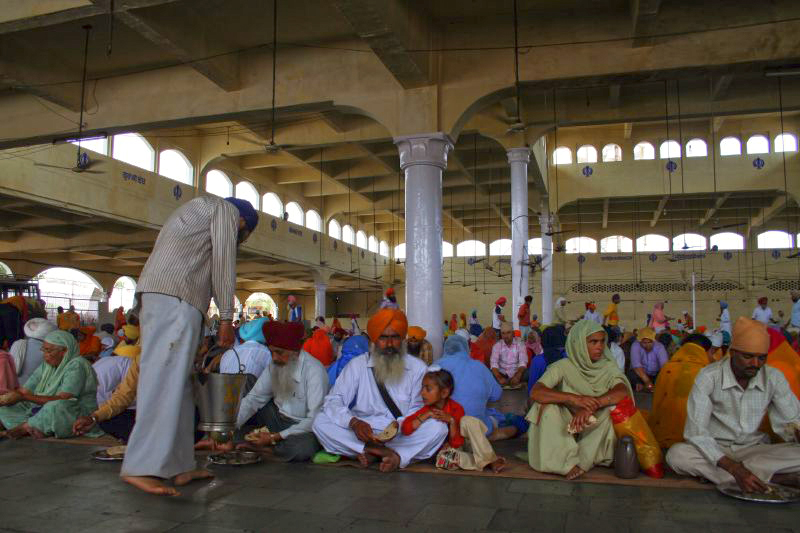
Khalsa principles of Deg to cook food (langar) in huge amount

Seva is an important and prominent part of the Sikh religion. Dasvand forms a central part of Sikh belief (of Vand Chhako) and literally means donating ten percent of one's harvest, both financial and in the form of time and service such as seva to the gurdwara and anywhere where help is needed. All Sikhs therefore get involved in this communal service whenever an opportunity arises. This in its simple forms can be: sweeping and washing the floors of the gurdwara, serving water and food (Langar) to or fanning the congregation, offering provisions or preparing food and doing other 'house keeping' duties.

=== Community life and other matters ===
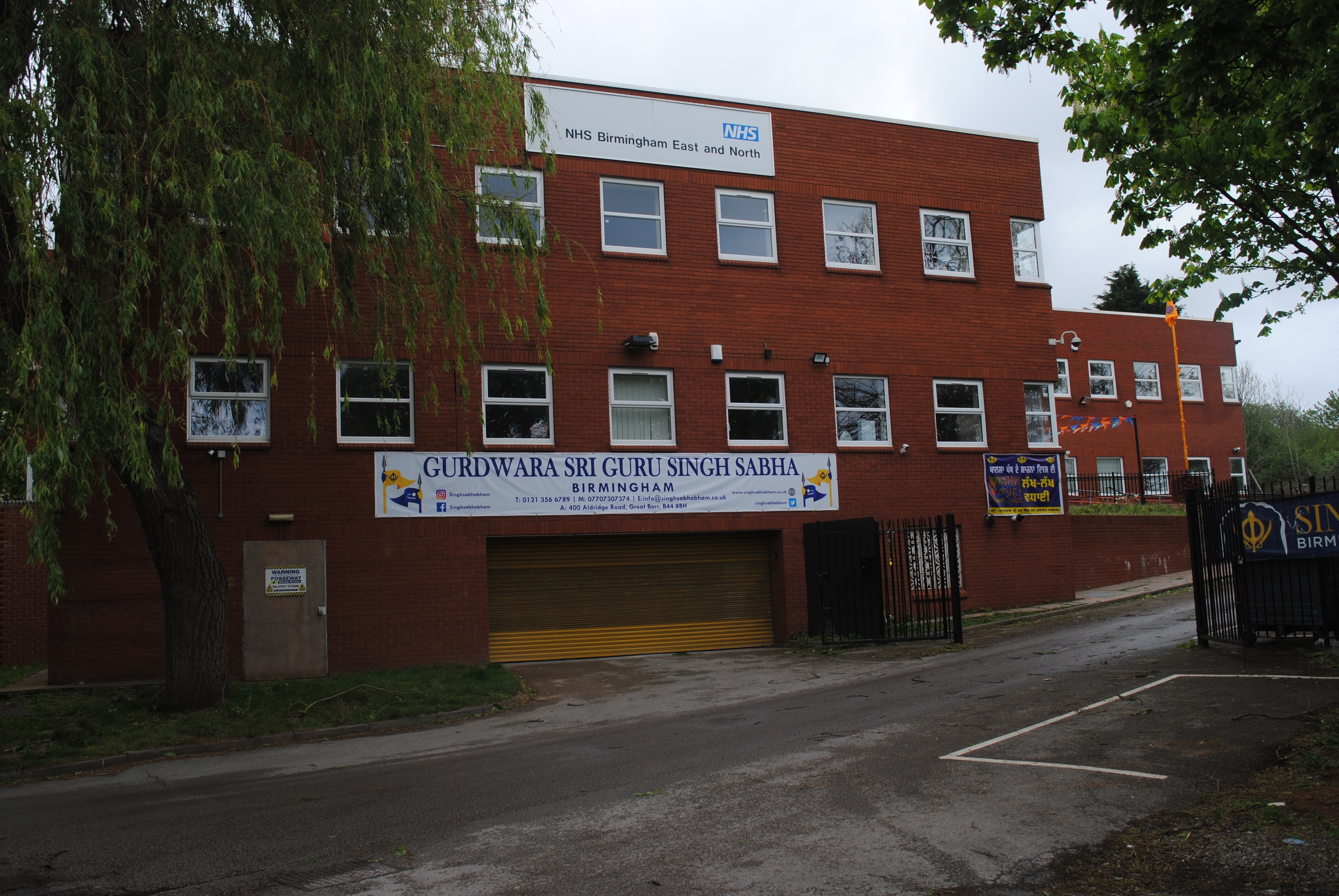
An office block repurposed as a Gurdwara, opened in Birmingham, England, in April 2019

Sikhism is said by practitioners to offer strong support for a healthy communal life. Sikh people often undertake to support worthy projects which benefit the larger community and promote Sikh principles. Importance is also given to Inter-faith dialogue, support for the poor and weak; better community understanding and co-operation.

== Learning and other facilities ==
Many gurdwaras also have other facilities for Sikhs to learn more about their religion, such as libraries, complexes for courses in Gurmukhi, Sikhism and Sikh scriptures, meeting rooms, and room-and-board accommodation for those who need it. Gurdwaras are open to all people, regardless of sex, age, sexuality or religion, and are generally open all hours of a day. Some gurdwaras also provide temporary accommodations (serais) for visitors or devotees. The gurdwara also serves as a community centre and a guest house for travellers, occasionally a clinic, and a base for local charitable activities. Apart from morning and evening services, the gurdwaras hold special congregations to mark important anniversaries on the Sikh calendar. They become scenes of much éclat and festivity during celebrations in honour of the birth and death (Joythi Joyth Samaey) anniversaries of the Gurus and Vaisakhi.

== History ==
=== Dharamsals ===
==== Origin ====
Sikhs believe that Guru Nanak was ordained directly by God to construct dharamsals (places of worship; meaning 'abode of righteousness'), as per the B.40 Janamsakhi:

Go, Nanak [answered God]. Your Panth will flourish. The salutation of your followers shall be: 'In the name of the true Guru I fall at your feet'. The salutation of the Vaisnava Panth is: 'In the name of Rama and Krisna'. The salutation of the Sanyasi Panth is: 'In the name of Narayan I bow before you'. The Yogi's salutation is: 'Hail to the primal One'. The Muslims' cry is: 'In the name of the One God peace be with you'. You are Nanak and your Panth will flourish. Your followers shall be called Nanak-panthis and their salutation will be: 'In the name of the true Guru I fall at your feet'. I shall bless your Panth. Inculcate devotion towards Me and strengthen men's obedience to their dharma. As the Vaisnavas have their temple, the yogis their asan, and the Muslims their mosque, so your followers shall have their dharamsala. Three things you must inculcate in your Panth: repeating the divine Name, giving charity, and regular bathing. Keep yourself unspotted while yet remaining a householder.

— B.40 Janamsakhi translated by W.H. McLeod, The Evolution of the Sikh Community (1975), page 30

The above statement separates the institution of Sikh dharamsals from those of other faiths, ordaining it as an independent institution based upon Sikhism alone. The first centre was built in Kartarpur, on the banks of Ravi River in the Punjab region by the first Sikh guru, Guru Nanak Dev in the year 1521. It now lies in the Narowal District of west Punjab (Pakistan). During the time of Guru Nanak, Sikh places of worship were known as dharamsals where kirtan was conducted by the early Sikh congregation.

The worship centres were built as a place where Sikhs could gather to hear the guru give spiritual discourse and sing religious hymns in the praise of Waheguru.

==== Spread ====
Guru Nanak would arrange early Sikh followers into various sangat congregations or parishes and instructed them to erect a dharamsal dedicated to spreading their Guru's message and teachings in their local area.

Bhai Gurdas states the following:

"Wherever Guru Nanak visited, that place became a place of worship. The most important centres including those of the jogis visited by the Guru became spiritual centres. Even houses have been turned into dharamsalas where kirtan was sung on the eve of Vaisakhi."

— Bhai Gurdas

Guru Nanak set-up an important dharamsal in the new-found Kartarpur after settling there. Other important dharamsals were located in Khadur, Goindwal, Ramdaspur, Tarn Taran, Kartarpur (Doaba) and Sri Hargobindpur, all of whom had been directly founded upon the instruction of a Sikh guru. When the Manji system and the later Masand systems of preachers and dioceses was set up, they were directed to found a dharamsal in their dedicated area of missionary work. Passionate early Sikhs would found dharamsals at various places across the Indian subcontinent and in Afghanistan as a means of expressing their devotion to the faith. Udasis were commanded by Guru Hargobind and his successors to found dharamsals in the distant reaches of the subcontinent far from the nucleus of Sikh centrality and rejuvenate the abandoned, dilapidated, or struggling dharamsals which had been founded by Guru Nanak and his followers in faraway places, which struggled due to their extreme distance from the central Sikh authority located mainly in Punjab. Guru Tegh Bahadur founded new dharamsal centres during his missionary tours of the Malwa region of Punjab and in northeastern India. Dharamsals were also established on trade routes utilized by Sikh Khatri merchants, especially upon the routes between Chitagong-to-Kabul plus Agra-to-Burhampur.

==== Structure and operation ====
The dharamsals were simple constructions and modest buildings, usually just consisting of a single humble room to house the local devotees of a locality for prayers. This was especially true in the rural areas, villages, and small towns where most of the local Sikh congregations consisted of simple peasants with little means of wealth. They were not built upon a specific axis because Sikhs believe God is omnipresent and the entire Earth is divine and equally fitting as such. The Adi Granth was installed at dharamsals after its codification and introduction in 1604. The dharamsals likely did not contain intricate and ornate furniture, fittings, and other decorative accessories, unlike modern-day gurdwaras. Dharamsals incorporated a body of water for public bathing due to the importance placed upon isnan (customary bathing in the morning) in Sikhism. Wherever natural sources of water were not readily available, a baoli (step-well), bucket well, or rahat (Persian wheel) would be implemented and installed in the courtyard of the structure or near a pool of water. The dharamsals incorporated a langar (communal kitchen) and lodge, especially the ones on important highways and trade routes, where persons could eat and stay without discriminated based upon their religious or caste-background. This facilitated the fast spread of Sikhism throughout the Punjab. Some dharamsals contained a hospital ward where the sick and injured could receive treatment. Other dharamsals incorporated carpentry workshops to construct beds and other needed furniture. The dharamsals often contained a school where one could learn Gurmukhi, Sikh music, and interpretation of Sikh scriptures.

=== Gurdwaras ===
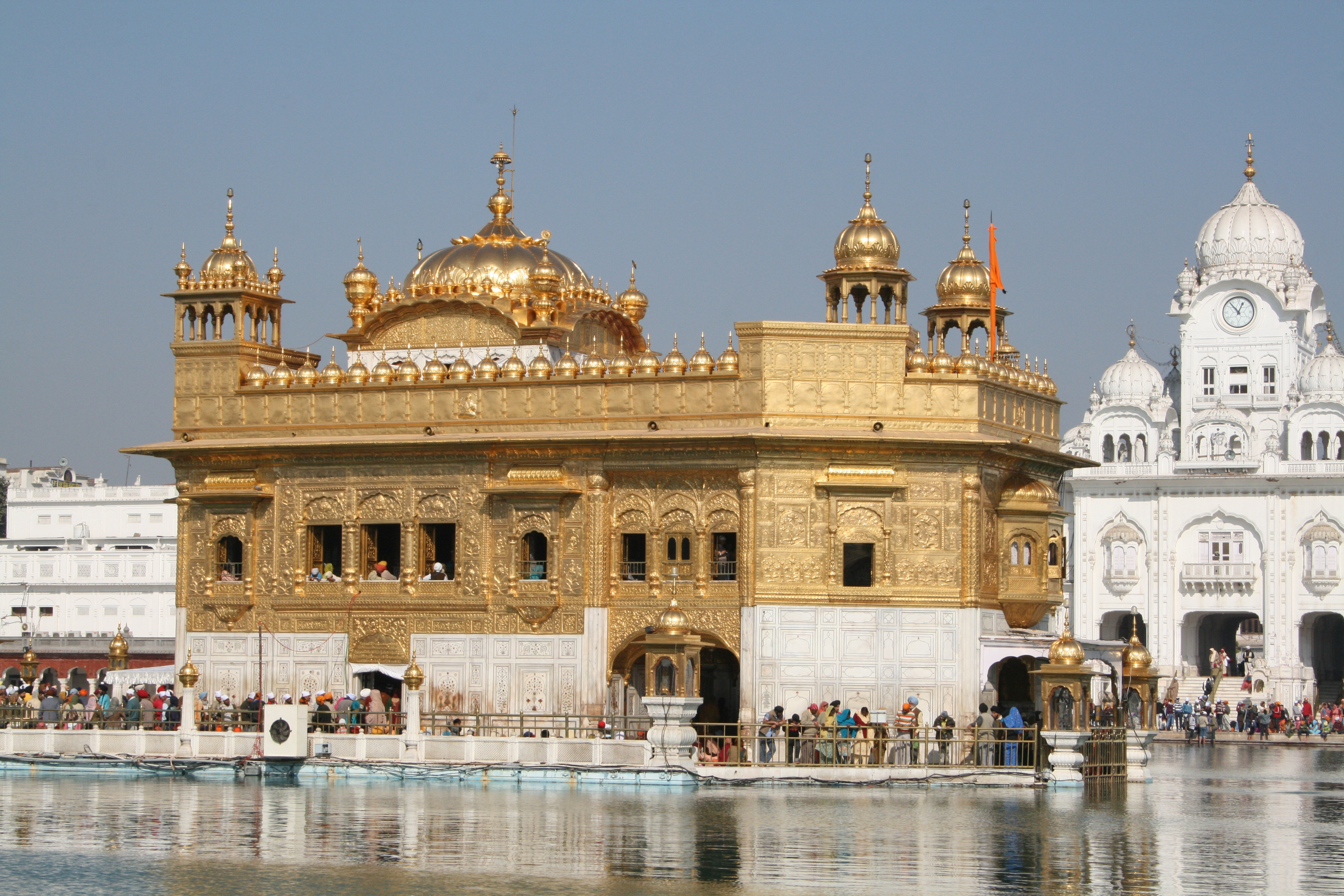
The Harmandir Sahib in Amritsar, India, known informally as the Golden Temple, is the holiest gurdwara of Sikhism, next to Akal Takht, a Sikh seat of power.

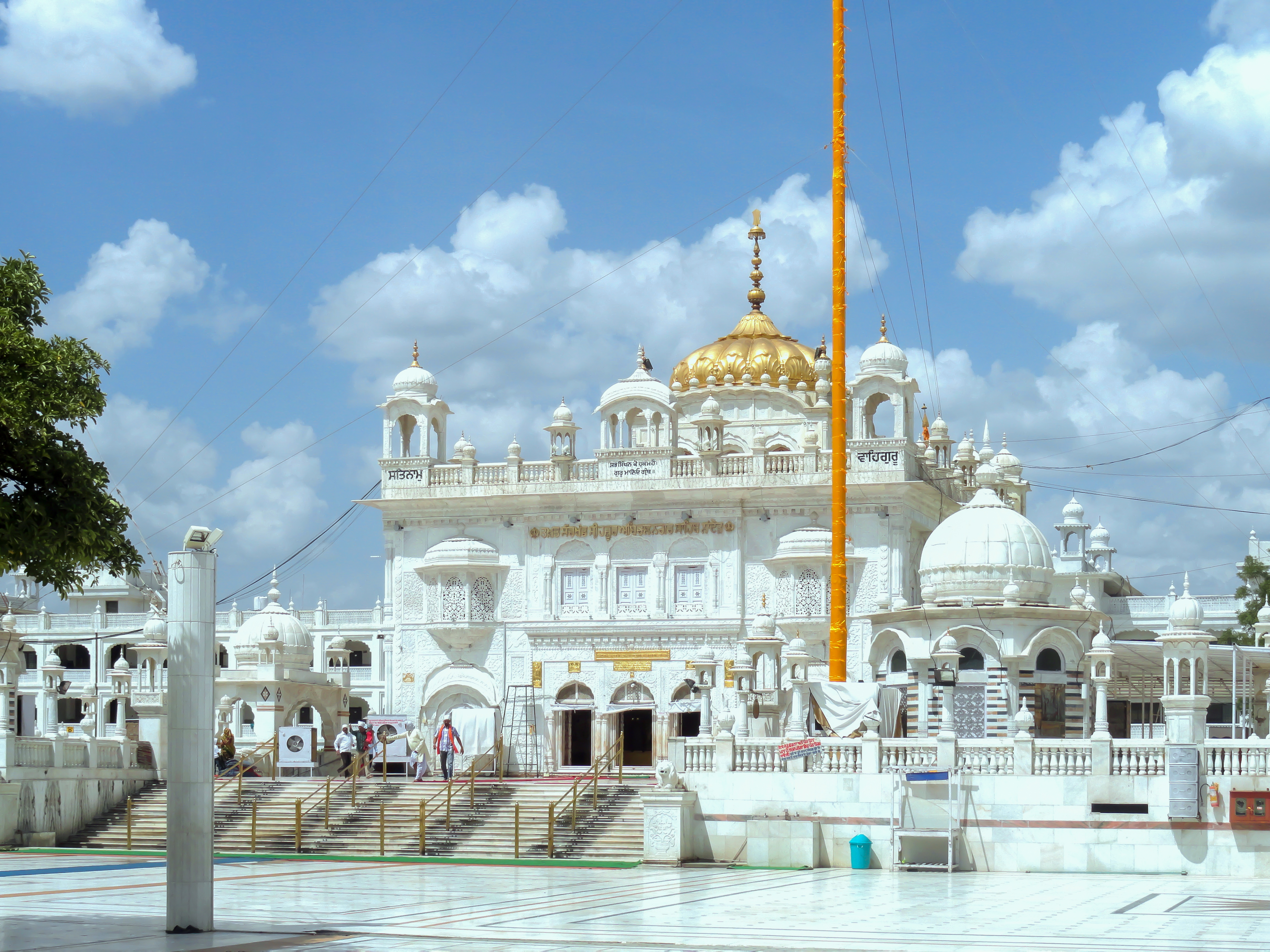
Shri Hazoor Sahib is a gurdwara in Nanded, Maharashtra, India; is one of the five takhts.

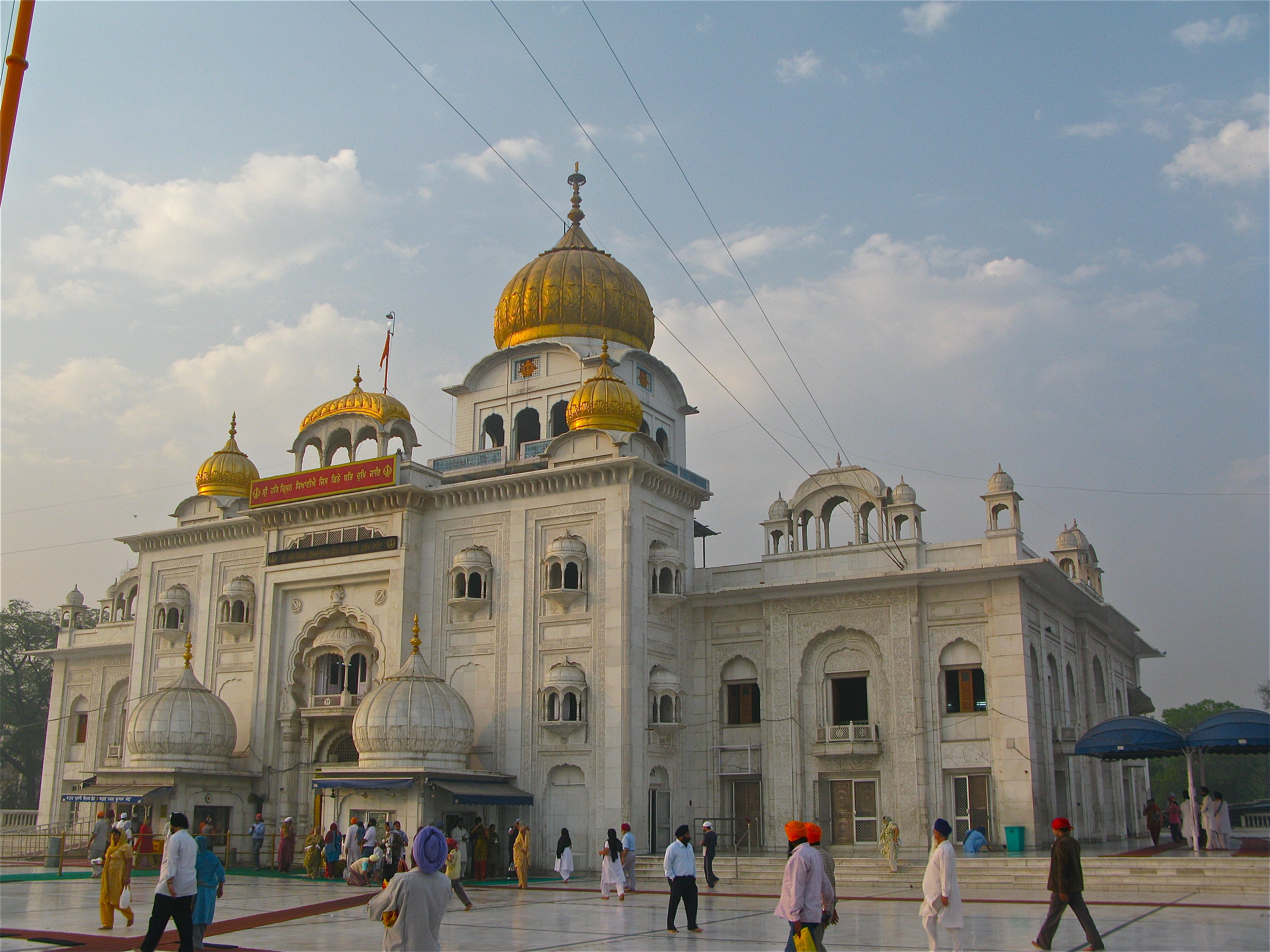
Gurudwara Bangla Sahib is one of the most prominent Sikh gurdwara in Delhi, India and known for its association with the eighth Sikh Guru, Guru Har Krishan, as well as the pool inside its complex, known as the "Sarovar."

As the Sikh population continued to grow, Guru Hargobind, the sixth Sikh guru, introduced the word "gurdwara". Gurdwaras evolved out of the earlier Dharamsal centres.

The etymology of the term gurdwara is from the words gur (ਗੁਰ) (a reference to the Sikh gurus) and dwara (ਦੁਆਰਾ) (gateway in Punjabi), together meaning 'the gateway through which the guru could be reached'.Thereafter, all Sikh places of worship came to be known as gurdwaras. According to Raj Sadosh, the term Gurdham refers to a place that had been visited by the Sikh gurus.

The use of 'sahib', as sometimes appended in the term Gurdwara Sahib, derives from a loanword of Arabic origin, meaning "companion" or "friend".

Kanwarjit Singh Kang classifies gurdwaras into two distinct categories:

1. Community gurdwaras - which are constructed by Sikhs to meet their religious and social requirements (includes ones constructed outside of India)
2. Historical gurdwaras - which are constructed by Sikhs at sites of historical importance in the history of Sikhism (these gurdwaras tend to be more famous)

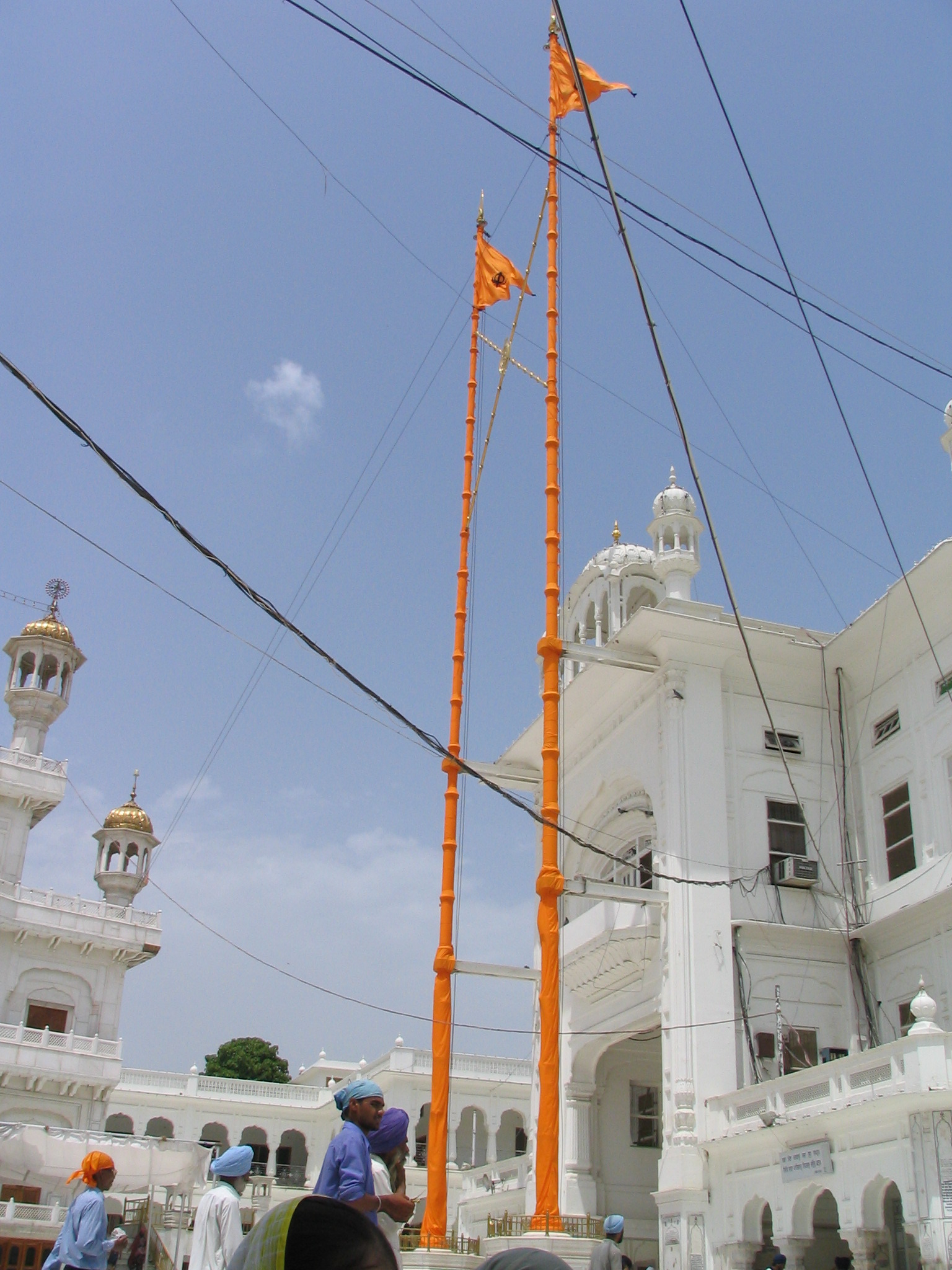
Nishan Sahib flags on poles at Harmandir Sahib, Amritsar.

Some of the prominent Sikh shrines established by the Sikh gurus are:

- Nankana Sahib, established in the 1490s by first Sikh Guru, Guru Nanak Dev, Punjab, Pakistan.
- Sultanpur Lodhi, established in 1499 became the Sikh centre during Guru Nanak Dev time Kapurthala District, Punjab (India).
- Kartarpur Sahib, established in 1521 by the first Sikh Guru, Guru Nanak Dev, near River Ravi, Narowal, Punjab, Pakistan.
- Khadur Sahib, established in 1539 by the second Sikh Guru, Guru Angad Dev ji, near River Beas, Amritsar District, Punjab, India.
- Goindwal Sahib, established in 1552 by the third Sikh Guru, Guru Amar Das ji, near River Beas, Amritsar District Punjab, India.
- Sri Amritsar, established in 1577 By the fourth Sikh Guru, Guru Ram Das ji, District Amritsar, Punjab India.
- Tarn Taran Sahib, established in 1590 by the fifth Sikh Guru, [Guru Arjan Dev ji], District Tarn Taran Sahib, Punjab India.
- Kartarpur Sahib, established in 1594 by the fifth Sikh Guru, Guru Arjan Dev, near river Beas, Jalandhar District, Punjab India.
- Sri Hargobindpur, established by the fifth Sikh Guru, Guru Arjan Dev, near river Beas, Gurdaspur District, Punjab India.
- Kiratpur Sahib, established in 1627 by the sixth Sikh Guru, Guru Hargobind, near river Sutlej, Ropar District, Punjab, India.
- Anandpur Sahib, established in 1665 by the ninth Sikh Guru, Guru Tegh Bahadur, near river Sutlej, Punjab, India.
- Paonta Sahib, established in 1685 by the tenth Sikh Guru, Guru Gobind Singh, near river Yamuna, Himachal Pradesh India.

By the early 20th century, a number of Sikh gurdwaras in British India were under the control of the Udasi mahants (clergymen). The Gurdwara Reform Movement of the 1920s resulted in Shiromani Gurdwara Parbandhak Committee taking control of these gurdwaras.

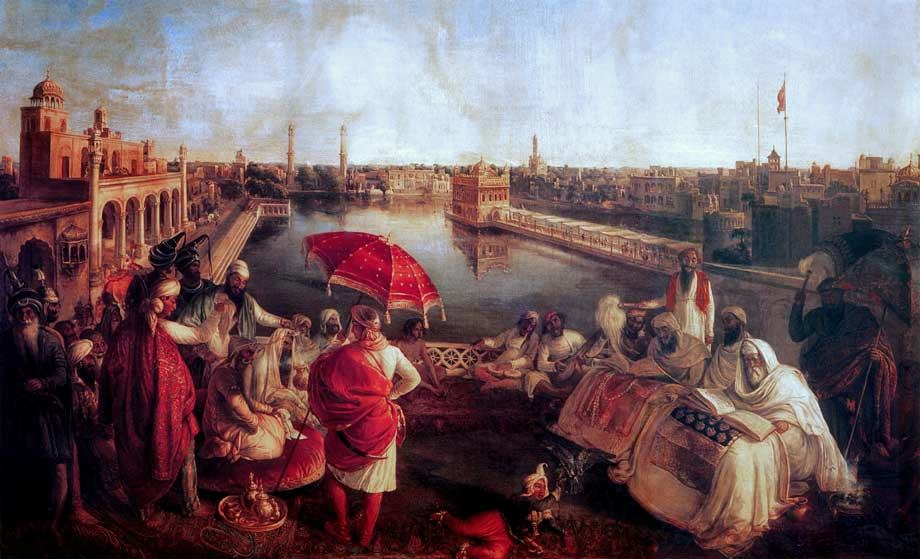
Maharaja Ranjit Singh listening to Guru Granth Sahib being recited near the Akal Takht, one of the five takhts, and the Golden Temple, holiest gurdwara of Sikhism, in Punjab, India (painting by Ágoston Schoefft, 1850).

=== Panj Takht ===
The Panj Takht which literally means five seats or thrones of authority, are five gurdwaras which have a very special significance for the Sikh community. They are result of the historical growth of the religion of Sikhism and represent the centers of power of the religion.

- Akal Takht Sahib, (the Throne of the Timeless One) established by Guru Hargobind in 1609 is situated in the complex of The Golden Temple, Amritsar, India
- Takht Sri Kesgarh Sahib, located in Anandpur Sahib, Punjab, India
- Takht Sri Damdama Sahib, located in Bathinda, Punjab, India
- Takhat Sri Harimandir Patna Sahib, in the neighborhood of Patna Sahib, Patna, Bihar, India
- Takht Sri Hazur Sahib, located on banks of the River Godavari in Nanded, Maharashtra, India.

== See also ==
- Panj Takht
- List of gurdwaras
- List of Sikh festivals
- Nanak Shahi bricks
- Sangat (Sikhism)
- Ramdwara
