= Sadharan Paath =

Sahej Paath (Punjabi: ਸਹਜ ਪਾਠ) or Sadharan Paath (Punjabi: ਸਧਾਰਨ ਪਾਠ) or even Khula Paath, literally means easy or simple recitation. It is a paath (recitation) which may be started and ended at any time; with as many or as few people participating as desired. The recitation of the Guru Granth Sahib is started at the beginning of the Granth Sahib and the whole of the 1430 pages of the Guru Granth is read in a slow fashion over from seven days to, in some cases, over several months. It is a slow, intermittent, non-regular, and non-urgent reading of the whole of the Guru Granth Sahib. Any paath which exceeds a week's length is referred to as a Sahej Paath.

== Description ==
The Sahaj Paath, alternatively spelt as Sehaj Path and also known as Sadharan Path, is the reading from beginning to end, with no time-limit for completion. of the Guru Granth Sahib, the Sikh Scriptures, which can be done at the reader's schedule. A paath may be fulfilled by one or more readers, and the pace depends entirely on those reading.

Fulfilling the paath can be done in honor of a particular occasion or simply to increase one’s feeling of connection to the Guru. When done monthly, it gives the Sadh Sangat (congregation of well-established people in Sikhism) an opportunity to establish a close relationship with the Guru and provides the blessing of His Word to the community.

Nowadays, there are also Sehaj paath apps which allow users to perform sehaj paath at any time and from any location.

It is an opportunity to practice pronunciation and study the meanings of the words. Someone can also listen to the recitation and correct the reader's pronunciation. Anyone can perform Sahej paath. It is a way beginners may use to do their first few paaths of the Guru Granth Sahib.

The reading concludes with a bhog ceremony.

== Usage ==
Khula Paaths are performed during the Antam Sankar ceremony, which are Sikh last rites.

== See also ==
- Akhand Paath
