= Bhandara (Hinduism) =

Free of cost meal service to the devotees

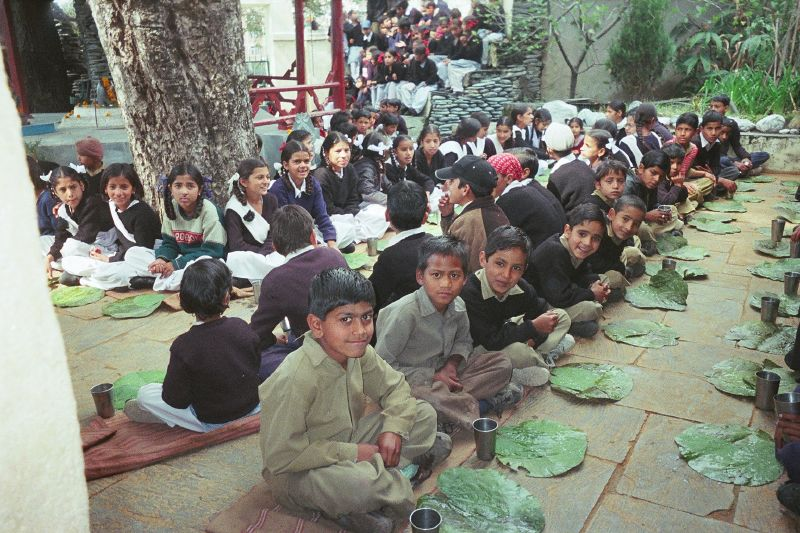

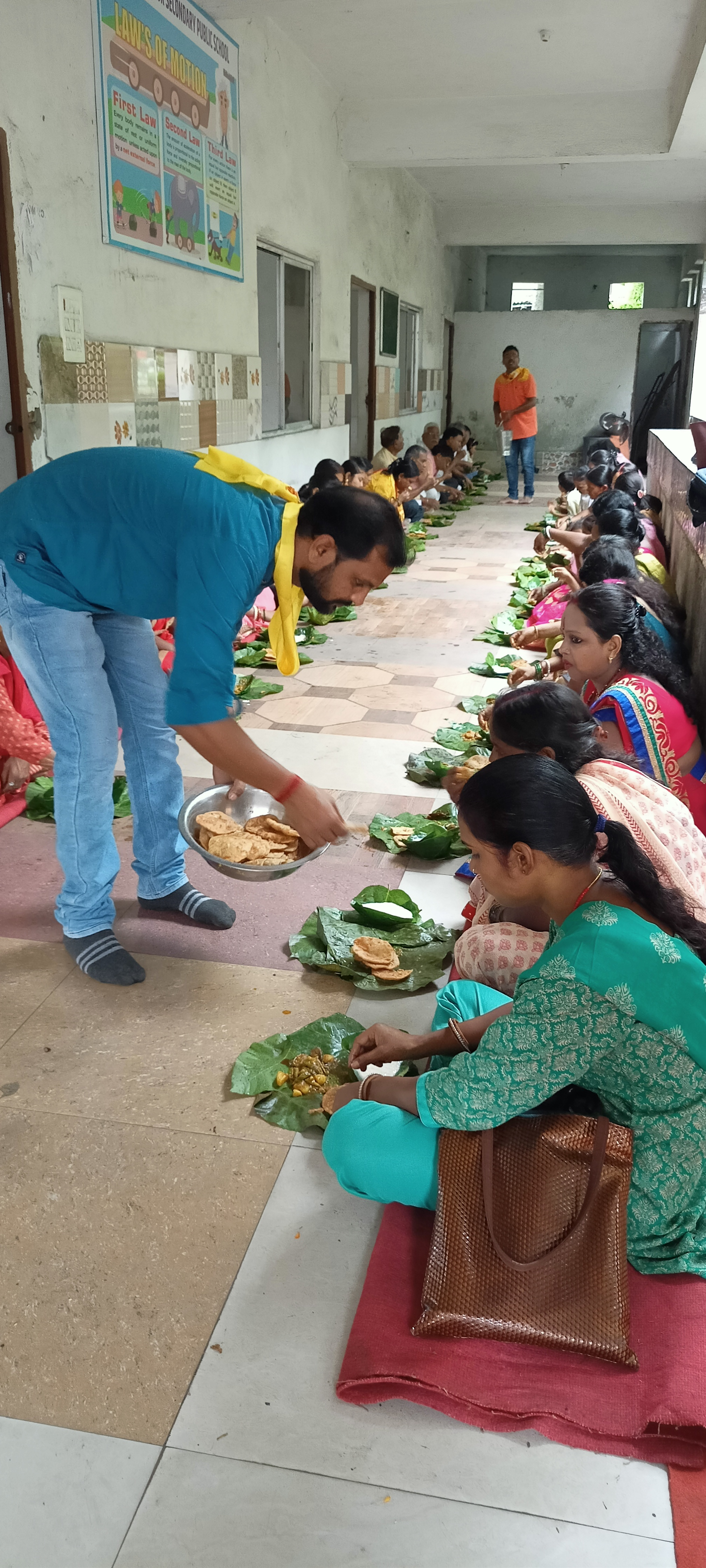

Bhandara service in Hinduism is a free communal meal, served to the devotees present in the Temple. Food is prepared and served to devotees waiting in short distance to the Temple. Bhandara, a festive occasion as a part of thanksgiving the lord and service to people in Hinduism.

== History ==
Bhandara is also the name of a district in Maharashtra which is also known as the “Rice bowl of the country”. Practicing Bhandara is mostly done by rich people, as welfare service to the God after thanksgiving. It also can be organized by any individual (referred to as the Yajamana) who wishes to thank the Lord. In Hinduism, after performing the holy rituals and community worshipping the almighty, the Yajamana serves food to the poor and the needy.

The Indian government has introduced a scheme known as ‘'Seva Bhoj Yojna’' to reimburse the government share of the Central Goods and Services Tax and the Integrated Goods and Service Tax for purchases by religious institutions of certain products for providing free meals. The scheme covers the raw ingredients of meals and is expected to cost a total of Rs. 325.00 Crores in the 2018/2019 fiscal year. To qualify, an institution will need to serve food free of charge to over 5000 people in the year.

== Initiatives ==
=== Satlok Ashram ===
Satlok Ashram, led by Sant Rampal Ji, is a spiritual leader who organizes large-scale Bhandaras at Satlok Ashrams located across India. These Bhandaras often coincide with major religious programs such as Divya Dharma Yagya Diwas, Kabir Prakat Diwas, and the Avataran Diwas. In addition to meal distribution, these events frequently include social welfare activities such as blood donation camps, anti-addiction drives, and dowry-free marriages. The emphasis lies on spiritual upliftment alongside community service.

=== Akshaya Patra Foundation ===
Akshaya Patra is a leading NGO that operates one of the world's largest mid-day meal programs aimed at feeding school children. It also hosts large Bhandaras during religious festivals and pilgrimages such as the Maha Kumbh, serving millions of free meals with a focus on hygiene and nutritional quality.

=== ISKCON ===
The International Society for Krishna Consciousness (ISKCON) regularly organizes Bhandaras in their temples across India and worldwide. Their Food for Life program extends free meal distribution to communities in need, especially during religious festivals and community events.

=== Radha Soami Satsang Beas (RSSB) ===
RSSB conducts langars and Bhandaras at their satsang centers and during large devotional gatherings. Their community kitchens emphasize unity and egalitarianism, serving vegetarian meals to devotees irrespective of social or religious distinctions.

=== Other Religious Organizations ===
Local charitable trusts and religious akharas also host community kitchens during spiritual fairs and auspicious occasions.

== See also ==
- Prasāda
- Langar (Sikhism)
- Langar (Sufism)
