= Karah Parshad =

Type of whole wheat flour halva

Karah Prashad
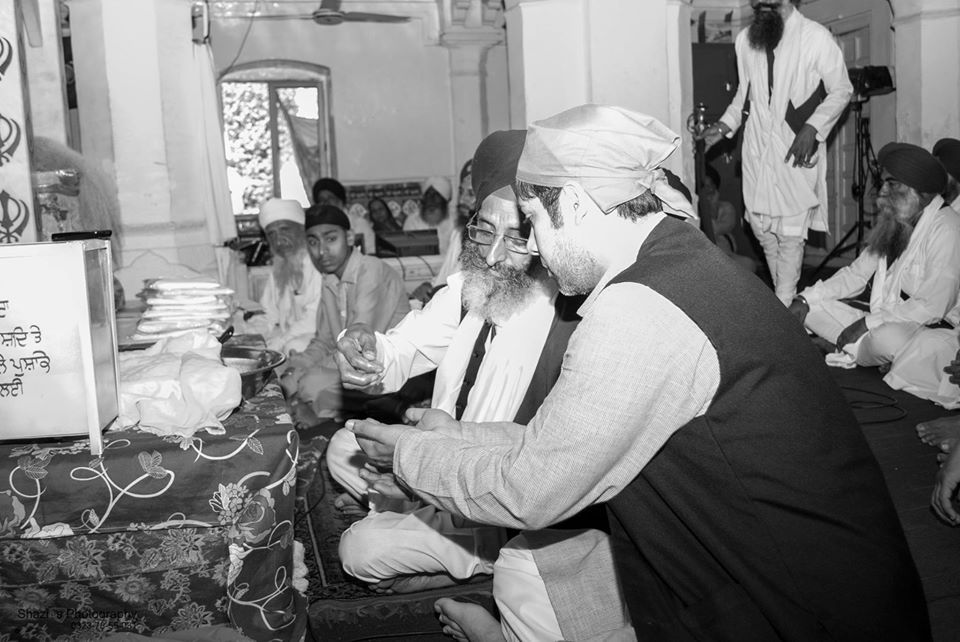
- Karah Parshad is shared at Gurdwara Dera Sahib, Lahore, Pakistan
- Type: Halva
- Main ingredients: Whole-wheat flour, clarified butter, sugar

In Sikhism, Karah Parshad (Punjabi: ਕੜਾਹ ਪ੍ਰਸਾਦ), is a sweet distributed to those visiting the Gurdwara and during certain Sikh rituals. It is the Sikh form of the prasada custom of Indian religions.

Karah Parshan is also known as Deg or Degh (literally meaning "cooking pot").

== Overview ==
It is offered to all visitors to the Darbar Sahib in a Gurdwara. It is regarded as a treat for attendees of gurmat seminars. Prashad is also taken at the initiation ceremony of Amrit Sanchar at the very end where it is shared out equally among all. The sacred food is also distributed during Naam Karan and Antam Sanskar ceremonies.

As a sign of humanity and respect, visitors accept the Prashad sitting, with hands raised and cupped. The offering and receiving of this food is a vital part of hospitality protocols. The Karah prasad is a sacred food; if it is not accepted, it may be interpreted by some Sikhs as an insult.

It has the same amount of whole-wheat flour, clarified butter and sugar, to emphasize the equality of men and women. The Sewadar serves it out of the same bowl to everyone in equal portions. It is a symbol showing that everyone is equal.

The Gurdwara is the place where Sikhs go to worship. Gurdwaras vary in size and design, but they all contain a kitchen, known as the langar, where free meals are prepared daily for anyone who wishes to eat. Visitors may also rest there overnight.

== History ==
According to W. H. McLeod, the practices surrounding karah prasad were presumably taken from the Hindu custom of offering prasad in temples. Karah Parshad was often procured from a public square near the former clock tower of Amritsar during the colonial period and offered at the Golden Temple.

== Preparation ==
Karah Parshad is a type of semolina halwa or sweetmeat. It is a whole wheat flour halva made with equal portions of whole-wheat flour, clarified butter, and sugar and double quantity of water.

In Pakistan, visiting Sikh yatri pilgrims are given pinni parshad, prepared by adding semolina to sattu, wheat, or ordinary flour. The wheat flour is heated in a large pot and desi ghee is added to the pot. After the oil is absorbed, refined crushed sugar is mixed in. Dried fennel seeds and thinly sliced almonds are crushed and mixed in. The resultant pinni parshad can last for several months whilst still being edible. The reason Sikh pilgrims are given pinni parshad insead of halwa parshad is due to halwa parshad being more perishable, thus one cannot present it after long periods of time as a tabarruk.

== See also ==
- Bhog
- Deg Tegh Fateh
