= Bhoga =

Sanskrit term meaning "enjoyment; pleasure; experience"

Bhoga (Sanskrit: भोग, bhoga) is a Sanskrit term meaning "enjoyment; pleasure; experience". Etymologically, bhoga is derived from the root bhuj-, meaning to "enjoy", "consume" or "relish". Bhoga in general usage refers to the consecrated food offering to a deity or enjoyment of worldly pleasures.

Denotatively, the meaning of the term bhoga is associated with the concepts such as "delight, enjoyment, consumption, indulgence, experience, and sensual pleasure", Whereas a connotative meaning implies to experience "pleasure without attachment."

In Hindu philosophy, bhoga and yoga are viewed as the two paths leading to nirvana. The power of maya is believed to provide bhoga to an individual-subject experiencer (bhogin), so that their self attains maturity and realizes its oneness with the higher self. In the Dvaita Vedanta tradition, bhoga is "Enjoyment or unending bliss in the state of liberation." It is asserted that the self can have bhoga only while it has a body and ceases to have it so after death.

The various Indian religions use bhoga and its associated terms to elucidate their concepts, such as sambhogakaya in Buddhism, Bhogopabhoga-parimana in Jainism, and Bhog in Sikhism. Other derivative terms include: Bhoganga ("pleasure-seeking individual"), Bhoga-sthana ("abode of enjoyment"), Bhoga-vastu ("object of enjoyment"), etc.

== Etymology ==
Bhoga (Sanskrit: भोग, bhoga) is a Sanskrit term derived from the root bhuj-, meaning to "enjoy", "consume" or "relish" in English. In Sanskrit, the term bhoga has the meaning "enjoyment; pleasure; experience". The meaning of bhoga is more accurately associated with the concepts such as "delight, enjoyment, consumption, indulgence, experience, and sensual pleasure"; connotatively it has a meaning to experience "pleasure without attachment." In its most commonly used sense, bhoga refers to the consecrated food offering to a deity or enjoyment of worldly pleasures.

Semantically, bhoga covers the notion of "feasting, pleasure, and enjoyment through experience". As an Ontological category, bhoga is understood to be an object of delight for the experiencing self (bhogin). Derivative and associated terms of bhoga include — Bhogaadhikaaras referring to ownership of property; Bhogabhuta: "involuntary action"; Bhoganga: "pleasure-seeking individual"; Bhoga-sthana: "abode of enjoyment"; Bhoga-vastu and Bhogya: "object of enjoyment"; Bhogopakarana: means of enjoyment; Bhokta and Bhoktru: enjoyer, experiencer, subject.

== Bhoga in religion ==
=== Hinduism ===
The Hindu deity Ganesha is the god of enjoyment and happiness in Hindu mythology and is mythologically associated with bhoga. In Dvaita Vedanta, bhoga is "Enjoyment or unending bliss in the state of liberation." In Shaiva Siddhanta, the mysterious power of god called Maya is believed to provide the individual with the means, places, and objects of enjoyment, collectively referred to as Bhogya-kanda. The provision of bhoga for the experiencing soul (bhogin) is believed to be for its own maturity. The Shvetashvatara Upanishad (1.12) describes a living entity as bhoktaa bhogyam "the enjoyer of nature." Vātsyāyana states that the self (ātman) can have bhoga (experience) only while it is embodied. The Mīmāṃsākas assert that the self can have no consciousness without a body. In the ritual of Śrāddha, performed for the dead, a deceased individual's bodiless spirit (preta) is believed to form an intermediate body called bhogadeha (food-body) while on its way towards its ancestors' (pitri) abode.

The Bhagavad Gita mentions bhoga in various contexts; in shlokas [2–35(101)] and [6(140)] bhoga is referred to as "enjoyment/material enjoyment", in shlokas [42–43(228)] as "sense enjoyment", in shloka [12(309)] as "necessities of life", in shloka [22(490)] as "reason of distress", in shloka [20(730)] as "pleasures of the gods", and in shlokas [11–12(998)] as "sexual pleasure/sense gratification".

In yogic terminology bhoga is described as a synonym for bliss, but it does not refer to surface level enjoyment as is common with laypeople, instead, for the yogis it is an experience in all the levels of existence as described in the Yoga Sutras of Patanjali. While laypeople think bhoga is indulgence in sensual pleasures that prevent self-realization in yogis, the practitioners of yoga regard bhoga as pleasure without attachment, which is required for a healthy body and mind, and is acquired through the practice of various Asanas, thus benefiting oneself with the power of enjoyment. For this reason, the yogis are sometimes referred to as bhogis, however yogic philosophers reject the usage of bhogis for them as it suggests excessive indulgence with biological needs and worldly desires, which they believe are obstacles to the union with the higher self. A bhogi seeks pleasure, whereas a yogi stays indifferent to pleasure and pain.

In the Nath yoga tradition, the human body is viewed as mirroring the cosmos consisting of two folds: Shiva and Shakti. The area of the body below navel is associated with Shakti and bhoga (experience, enjoyment), whereas the area above navel is associated with Shiva and tyaga (renunciation).

In Hindu philosophy, bhoga and yoga are viewed as the two paths leading to nirvana. B. K. S. Iyengar in his book Light on Yoga states that an aspirant who masters the three main bandhas, considered important in Pranayama, namely: Jalandhara bandha, Uddiyana bandha and Mula bandha, will reach the crossroads of their "destiny", where one path leads to bhoga and another to yoga; people whose senses are directed outwards towards the objects of the creator will tread the path of bhoga, whereas people whose senses are directed inwards towards the creator of the objects will follow the path of yoga. The Hindu philosopher Swami Vivekananda once remarked: "Either 'bhoga' or 'yoga' — either enjoy this life or give up and be a yogi. None can have both in one. Now or never — select quick. 'He who is very particular gets nothing,' says the proverb."

The term bhoga is also regarded as synonym for Sambhoga, however the former is associated with individual experiences, whereas the later with communal experiences. Sambhogha is often used to refer to Penile–vaginal intercourse. Philosopher Osho in his book Sambhog Se Samadhi Ki Aur ("from sexual intercourse towards enlightenment") guides the readers on the path of enlightenment through bhoga. In Hinduism, sambhoga for childbirth is bhoga, but if it is for only sexual pleasure, it is called bhogvaasanaa ("the desire for sex"). According to David Gordon White, in Tantra, the term bhoga includes the notions of "sexual enjoyment", and "food"; with "feeding on" being its primary meaning. In mainstream Tantric practices, bhoga involves the feeding of deities, whereas, the more esoteric practices connote it as pleasure of sexual enjoyment by consumption of sexual emissions. In the Tantric practice of Panchamakara, the female partner is consecrated to become a Shakti, who is then "enjoyed (bhogyā) or worshiped (pūjyā)."

=== Buddhism ===
In Buddhism, the doctrine of Trikaya, or three bodies theory posits that the "transcendental Buddha" has three states of bodily existences, of which Sambhogakaya body, or "enjoyment body" is the state of great bliss, identical to one's experience in the "god realm". The other two states are Dharmakaya body, or the transcendent state, and the Nirmanakaya body, or the "body of transformation", which is a form of the Buddha's manifestation, with the most recent being that of the Indian prince Siddhartha Gautama.

=== Jainism ===
In Jainism, Bhogopabhoga-parimana, refers to a Jain ethical code of conduct that establishes constraints on the use of objects, limiting ones attachment.

=== Sikhism ===
In Sikhism, the term bhog (derived from Sanskrit bhoga), denotes the religious observances that accompany the reading of the concluding part of the Guru Granth Sahib. Bhog is a devotional act that acknowledges Waheguru, to whom the devotees offer the fruits of their labour, and signifies the completion of Sikh rites. Bhog can be performed in conjunction with weddings, anniversaries, funeral services and other occasions that a family or a worshipping community consider as appropriate. In the Sikh tradition, bhog ceremony, marks the ceremonial conclusion of the complete reading (akhand path) of the Guru Granth Sahib.

== Bhoga and food ==
The Upanishads, principal scriptures of Hinduism, give food a very high prominence, believing "god is life and life is food". As god resides in food, the food one eats is god, and one who eats is also god. Hindu gods and goddesses are often worshipped by offering them food as part of naivedya, which, is a categorical term for the exchanges given by the worshipper to a deity for desired benefits (prasad). While the food offering is symbolically 'consumed' by the deity, it becomes bhogya, which is thereafter called prasad and is then taken by the devotees.

The food offering to deities as bhoga is mostly vegetarian consisting of milk and fruits, however, it varies according to the worship traditions. As an offering of bhoga, Shiva, a yogi, is given raw unprocessed milk, and Vishnu, a householder, is given processed food. The Hindu goddesses are renowned as raktvilaasini (one who loves blood). The goddess Bhudevi in the Bhagavata Purana desired to drink human blood. In the Mahabharata and the Ramayana, the cause of wars is believed to be the thirst of the goddess. As part of bhoga, the goddesses are mostly offered blood sacrifices of animals, such as goats, buffaloes, and birds. The goddess of wealth, Lakshmi, is provided sweet food inside the house, whereas her sister Alakshmi, the goddess of misery, is offered a lemon with seven chillies outside the house.

The derivative term Bhog is used in West Bengal and neighboring regions for consecrated food distributed during major Hindu festivals like the Durga Puja. The bhog is commonly served at large temple complexes and is blessed food that doubles up as complete meal as opposed to prasad, which in West Bengal, would be in smaller quantity and would not be intended as a meal. The most common form of bhog is Khichdi, served with semi dry vegetable preparation, sweet tomato chutney and payesh (kheer), which is rice pudding. This is typically served on flat plates of Sal tree leaves joined with small twigs, all of which are discarded in the end.

In Sikhism, the Karah Prasad distributed at a Sikh congregational service is sometimes called 'Bhog'.

== See also ==
- Bhogi
