= Langar (Sikhism) =

Sikh community kitchen

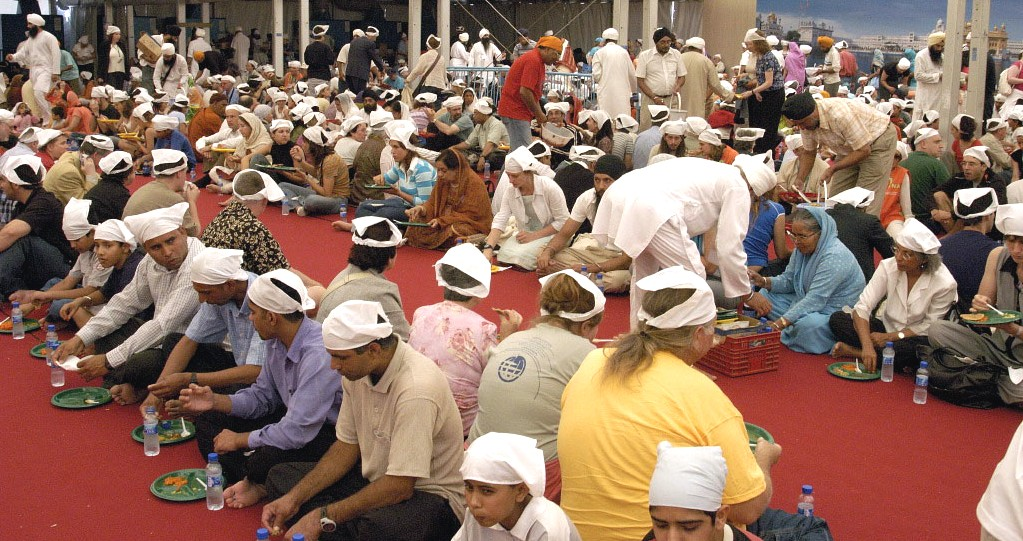
A community meal in progress at a Sikh langar

In Sikhism, a langar (Punjabi: ਲੰਗਰ, pronunciation: [lʌŋɾ], 'kitchen') is the community kitchen of a gurdwara, which serves meals to all free of charge, regardless of religion, caste, gender, economic status, or ethnicity. People sit on the floor and eat together, and the kitchen is maintained and serviced by Sikh community volunteers who are doing seva ("selfless services"). The meals served at a langar are always lacto-vegetarian. The name for a Sikh community kitchen is Langarkhana.

== Etymology ==
Langar is a Persian word that was eventually incorporated into the Punjabi language and lexicon.

== Origins ==
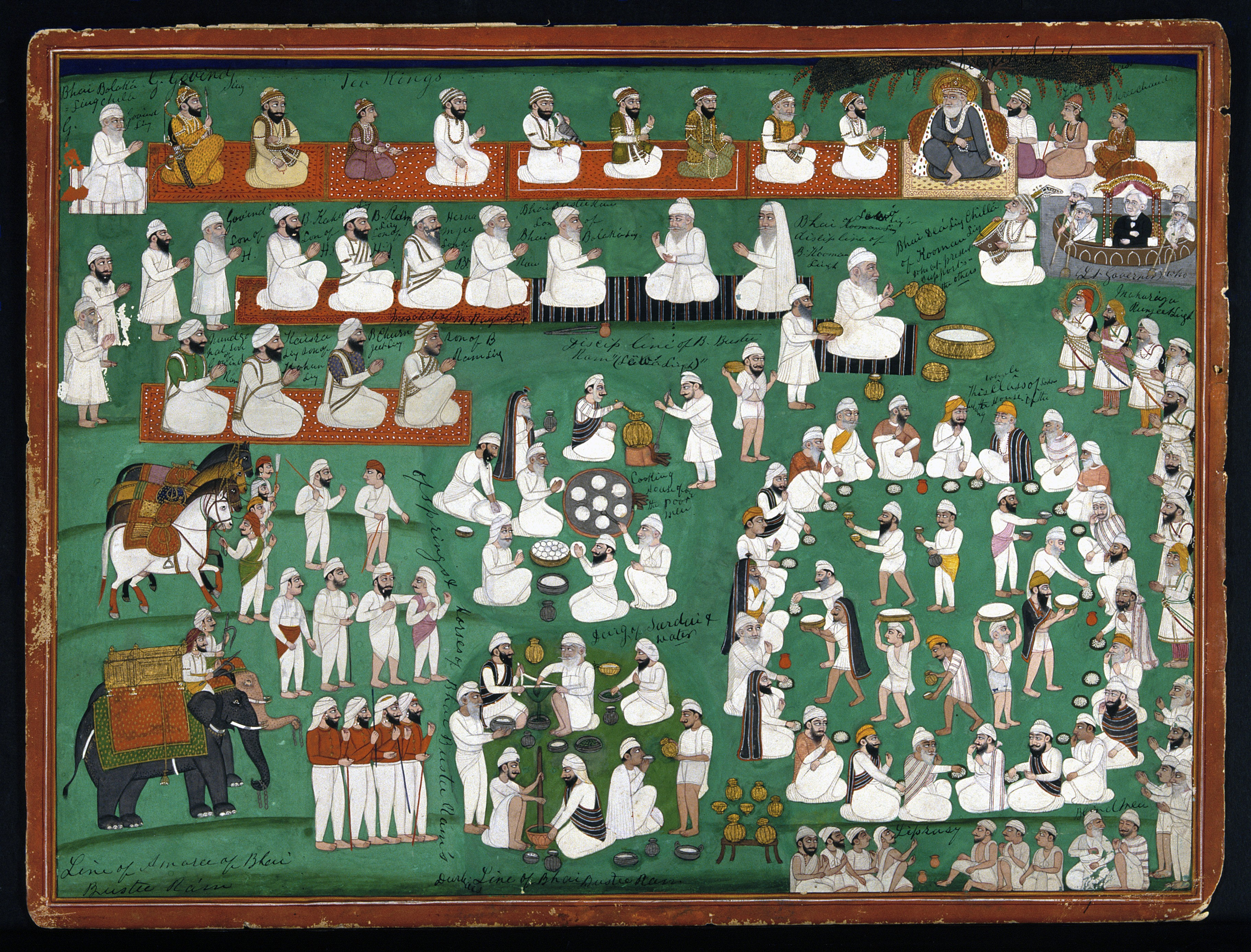
Sikh painting showing a langar in the bottom right, c. 19th century

The concept of charity and providing cooked meals or uncooked raw material to ascetics and wandering yogis has been known in eastern cultures for over 2000 years. However, in spite of institutional support from several kings and emperors of the Delhi sultanate (up to the Mughal Empire), it could not be institutionalized into a sustainable community kitchen, but continued as volunteer-run free food opportunities.

Within the Jammu hills, a significant component of the Sufi missionaries' social outreach was to organize community kitchens, known locally as langar. In addition to providing meals to the needy, they were also intended to promote inclusion within their society and discourage segregation and untouchability, both of which were widely practised throughout the Indian subcontinent. This practice, largely facilitated through donations, allowed participants to discard their social identity and was considered a sacred duty. The tradition was inaugurated in the 12–13th century by Shaikh Farid.

The community kitchen started by the Sikh Gurus, was universal and accepting of people from all faiths and backgrounds, a tradition which has continued to this day. The type of food served and the method of cooking employed, further helped make Sikh langar universally accepted by all faiths and castes.

Several writers such as Gurinder Singh Mann and Arvind-Pal Singh Mandair have alluded to this fact of cooked food (or raw material) being provided to travelers, ascetics and wandering yogis, free food distribution practices being in vogue in fifteenth century among various religious groups like Hindu Nath Yogis and Muslim Sufi saints. However, no evidence exists of formal institutionalized community kitchens, providing cooked free meals, continuously, over a period of time by any particular community.

The roots of such volunteer-run charitable feeding is very old in Indian tradition; For example: Hindu temples of the Gupta Empire era had attached kitchen and almshouse called dharma-shala or dharma-sattra to feed the travelers and poor, or whatever donation they may leave. These community kitchens and rest houses are evidenced in epigraphical evidence, and in some cases referred to as satram (for example, Annasya Satram), choultry, or chathram in parts of India. In fact, Sikh historian Kapur Singh refers to Langar as an Aryan institution.

The Chinese Buddhist pilgrim I Ching (7th century CE) wrote about monasteries with such volunteer-run kitchens. The institution of the Langar emerged from Fariduddin Ganjshakar, a Sufi Muslim saint living in the Punjab region during the 13th century. This concept further spread and is documented in Jawahir al-Faridi compiled in 1623 CE.

The concept of langar—which was designed to be upheld among all people, regardless of religion, caste, colour, creed, age, gender, or social status—was an innovative charity and symbol of equality introduced into Sikhism by its founder, Guru Nanak around 1500 CE in North Indian state of Punjab.

The second Guru of Sikhism, Guru Angad, is remembered in Sikh tradition for systematizing the institution of langar in all Sikh Gurdwara premises, where visitors from near and far could get a free simple meal in a simple and equal seating. He also set rules and training method for volunteers (sevadars) who operated the kitchen, placing emphasis on treating it as a place of rest and refuge, and being always polite and hospitable to all visitors.

It was the third Guru, Guru Amar Das, who established langar as a prominent institution, and required people to dine together irrespective of their caste and class. He encouraged the practice of langar, and made all those who visited him attend langar before they could speak to him.

== Contemporary practice ==
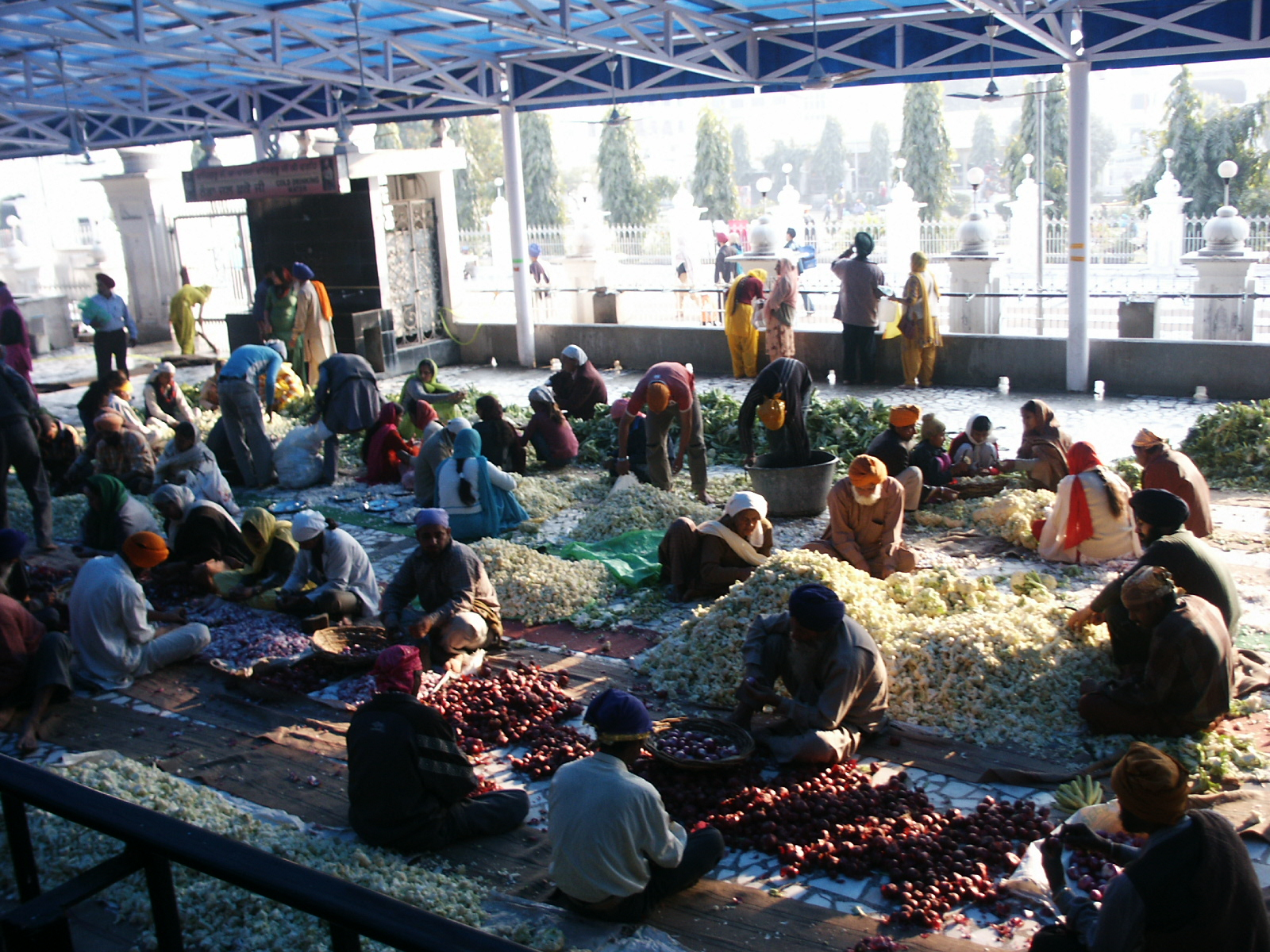
Volunteers helping preparing food for langar at the Golden Temple

Langars are held in gurdwaras all over the world, most of which attract members of the homeless population. The volunteers feed people without any discrimination, alongside the Sikh devotees who gather. Almost all gurdwaras operate langars where local communities, sometimes consisting of hundreds or thousands of visitors, join for a simple lacto-vegetarian meal. As seen in Canadian gurdwaras, the langar provides for studying students when low on funds at the end of a semester, enabling them to put food into less traditional styrofoam containers to get back to campus to continue their studies.

== Role in protest and COVID-19 pandemic relief ==
The pandemic effectively stopped all engagement of the Sikh religious community, including the ritual of Langar. Langar is not akin to a soup kitchen but a religiously driven charity where the hungry are always welcomed and a demonstration of equality. This core idea caused gurdwaras to not close and instead look for different ways to complete their "seva", the third principle reflected in the ritual of Langar, to help those in need during the pandemic. At least 80 gurdwaras around the United States took action to provide for their local communities. An example of this is the Sikh Center of New York in Queens Village, which, within a two-month period, served more than 145,000 free meals to those in need. During the Black Lives Matter protests in April 2019, the Queens Village gurdwara used their cookhouse and sevaders to produce 15,000 meals in a single day. Another method implemented by some gurdwaras was the "drive-through" Langars; when the hungry could not come within the temple due to restriction, they came outside to serve. This was most notably implemented by the Khalsa Care Foundation in Los Angeles as well as the Riverside Gurdwara. The Sikh volunteers in California handed out hot food and water as well as hand sanitizer and medical supplies. In New Delhi, India, the practice of a "oxygen langar" was introduced to help provide free oxygen tanks to individuals suffering hypoxemia or low oxygen blood levels, a common symptom of COVID-19.

== Gallery ==
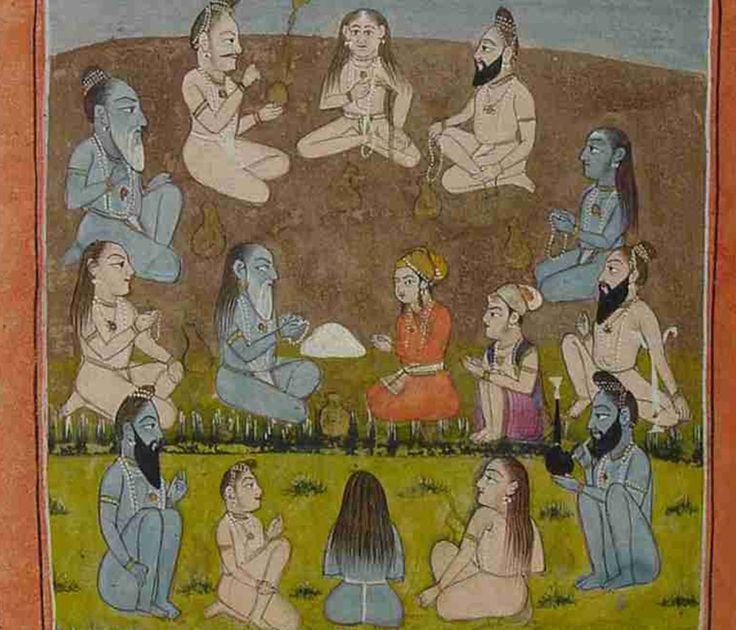
Janamsakhis painting of Guru Nanak's dialogue with Sant Ren feeding the hungry ascetics during the Sacha Sauda episode

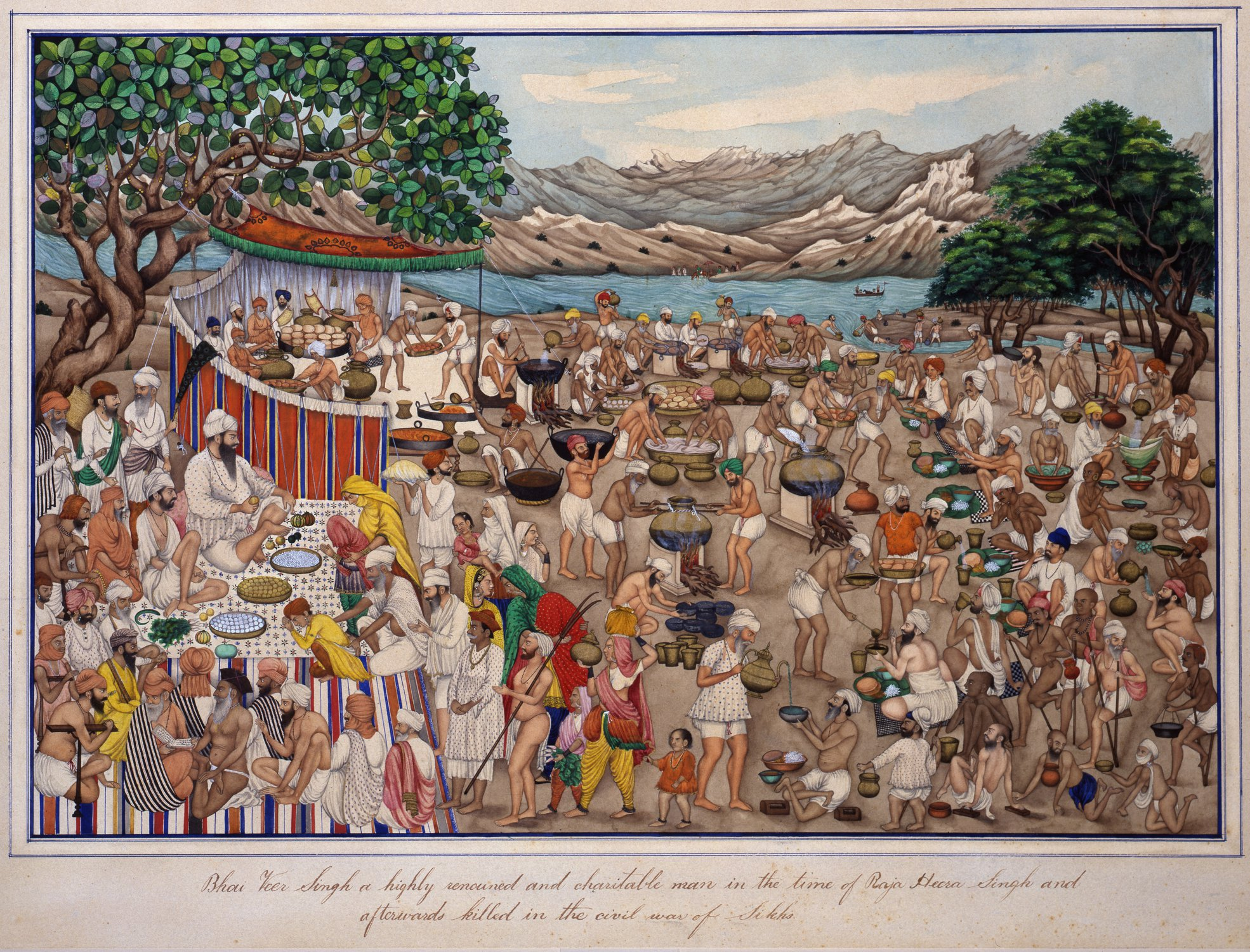
Langar at the camp of Bir Singh Naurangabad, Punjab, c. 1850

== See also ==
- Bhog
- Pangat
- Karah Parshad (Sikhism)
- Prasad (Hinduism)
- Bhandara (community kitchen)
