= Paath =

Paath or Path (Punjabi: ਪਾਠ (Gurmukhi)), from the Sanskrit patha which means reading or recitation, is, in the religious context, reading or recitation of the holy texts. In Sikhism, comprehension of what is being read is considered more important than ritual recitation of the Guru Granth Sahib.

== Background ==
Paath is the recitation of Gurbani. However it is considered lower than gurbani vichar/discussion.

It can also be called prayers of some instances. It may be done individually or in a group; it can be the recitation of one’s Banis or any part of the Siri Guru Granth Sahib, alone or with others listening or reciting along. The person reciting Gurbani should pronounce every syllable correctly so that the Naad, the sound current may be produced and affect the consciousness of the one reciting and the one listening.

Gurbani may be recited in the Sadh Sangat at any time, whether or not one is in the presence of Siri Guru Granth Sahib. A beautiful form of recitation in a group is to divide into groups of men and women with each reciting an alternate sutra. (A sutra is a complete line of poetry.) In the Gurmukhi each sutra is separated by two vertical lines (//). Gurbani should be recited rhythmically and meditatively.

== Daily regimen ==
Reading of certain banis is part of a Sikh’s nitnem or daily religious regimen. Paath of these prescribed texts is performed from a handy collection, called gutka (missal or breviary) or from memory. Three of the banis, Guru Nanak’s Japji and Guru Gobind Singh’s Jaap Sahib and Amrit Savaiye — constitute the Sikhs mandatory morning paath or devotions, and two — Rehras and Kirtan Sohila — evening paath. Individuals add certain other texts as well such as Sabad Patshahi 10, Anand Sahib and Sukhmani.

The paath is also performed individually and more particularly in sangat from the Guru Granth Sahib itself. The Holy Volume is ceremonially installed under coverlets on a decorated seat resting on a raised platform, with a canopy above, and is opened by the paathi or reader who sits reverentially behind. Usually, another person stands in attendance, waving the fly-whisk over the Holy Book. The paathi should have bathed and be dressed in clean clothes.

== Types ==
Besides the reading of one single hymn to obtain vak or hukamnama (lesson or command for the day) or of some passages, three forms of complete paath of the Guru Granth Sahib are current:

- Akhand Pāth (unbroken recitation completed in forty-eight hours),
- Saptahik Pāth (completed in a week or seven days, derived from the word saptāh meaning "week") and
- Sadharan or Sahij Pāth (taken in slow parts with no time-limit for completion).
- Ati Akhand Paath, hardly ever practised, is when a single participant reads within the prescribed 48 hours the entire text.

== See also ==
- Sadharan Paath
- Akhand Path
