= Hukam =

Concept in Sikhism

Hukam (Punjabi: ਹੁਕਮਿ / حکم) is a Punjabi word derived from the Arabic ḥukm, meaning 'command' or 'divine order'.

In Sikh doctrine, the Gurus use the concept of hukam in their teachings to describe the empirical world and the nature of human existence (for example, birth and death, or physical conditions), for all is understood to function in according to this divine order of command.

In Sikhism, hukam represents the goal of becoming in harmony with the will of God and thus attaining inner peace.

It also designates the practice of opening up at random to a page in the Sikh scripture (Guru Granth Sahib) to receive God's guidance on how to handle a certain situation, as answer to a question, or as more general guidance for that day. This ceremony is also known as Vak.

== See also ==
- Hukamnama
