= Repast =

A repast is a meal or taking of food. Repast may also refer to:

- Repast (film), a 1951 film directed by Mikio Naruse
- Repast (magazine), a quarterly food history magazine
- Repast (modeling toolkit), a computer software toolkit
- Repast (funeral), a post-funeral communal meal
