= Funeral =

Ceremony for a person who has died

Funerary practices in different cultures

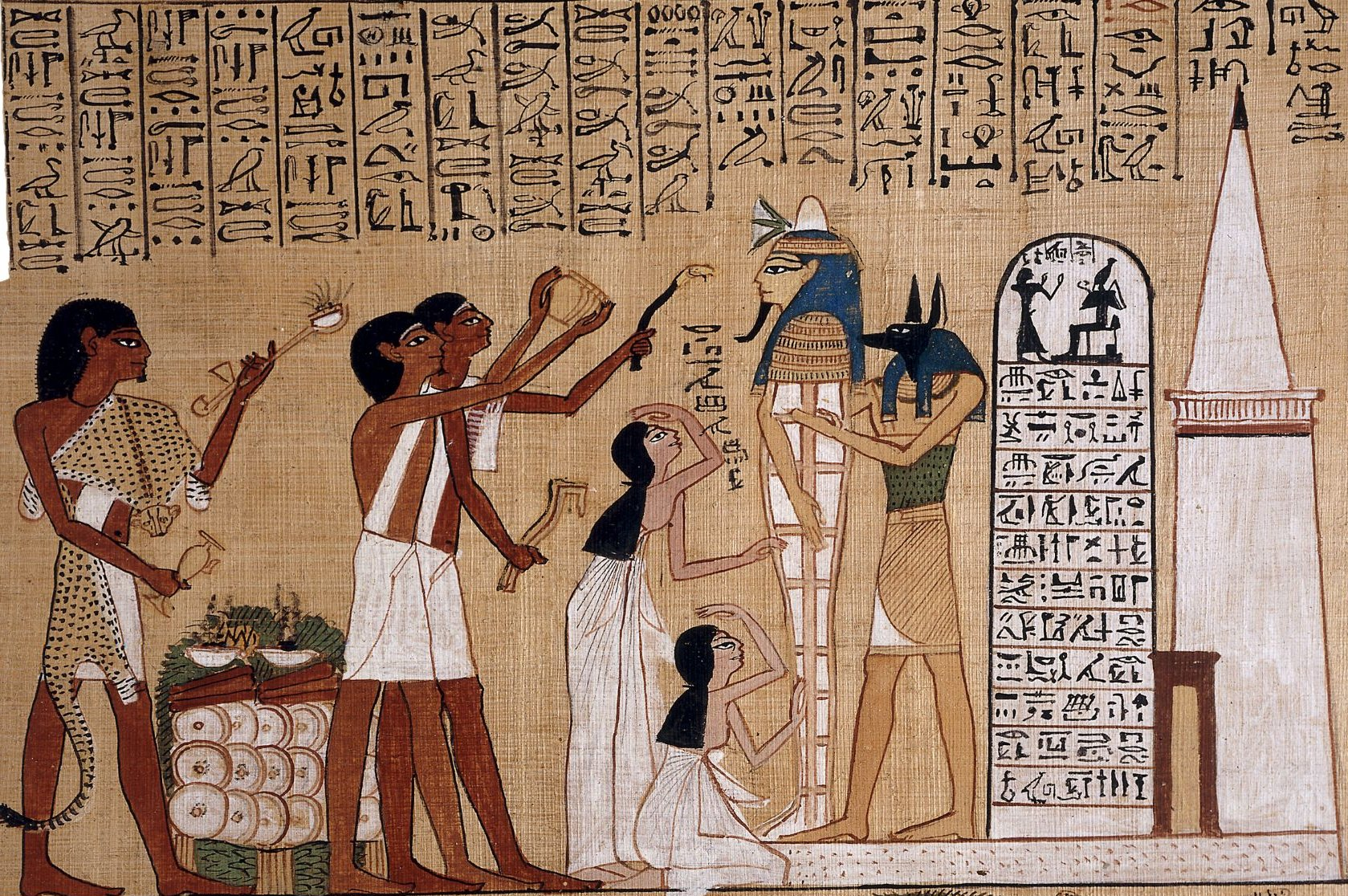
Opening of the mouth ceremony (Ancient Egypt)

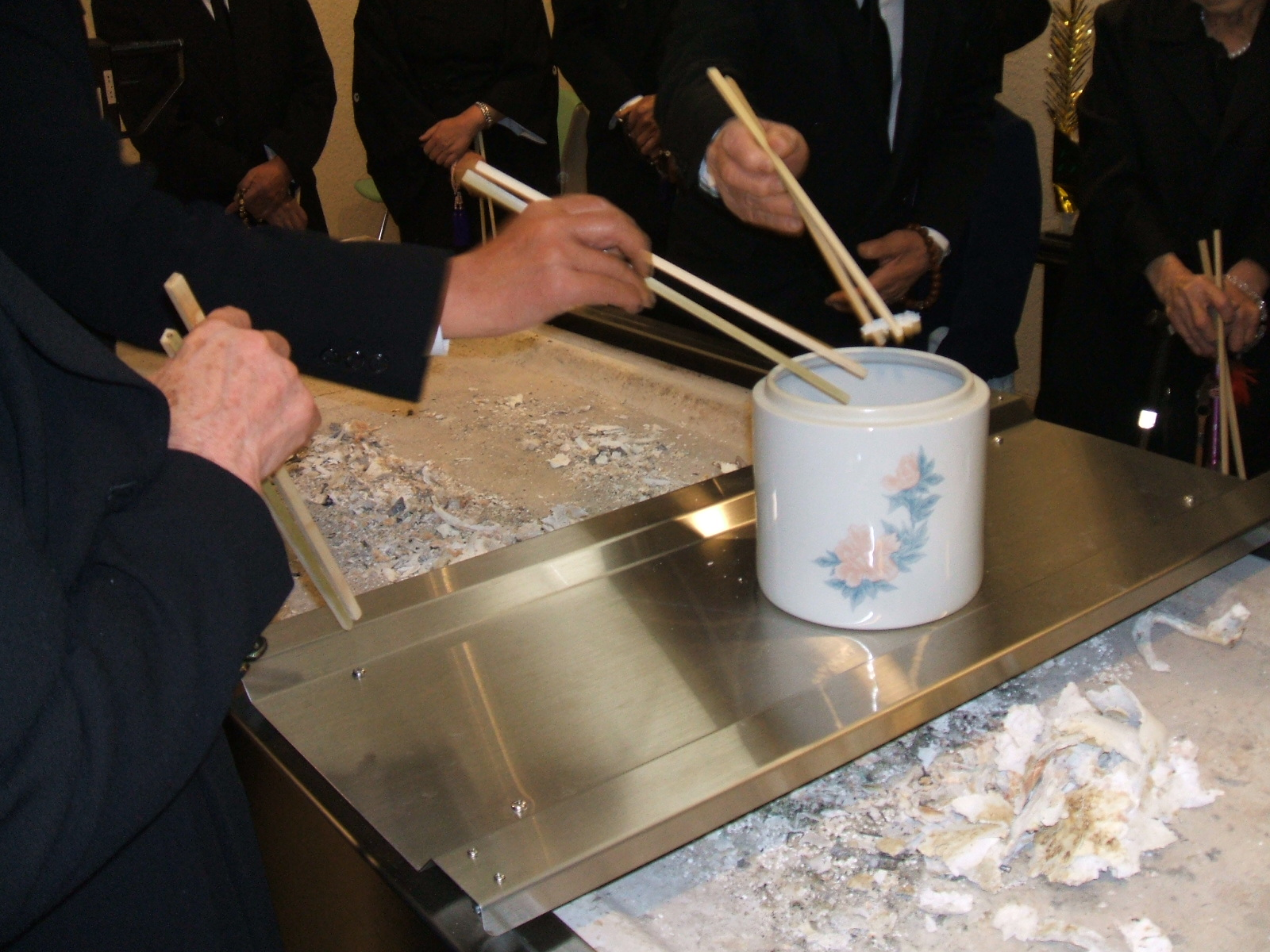
Kotsuage (Japanese Buddhism)

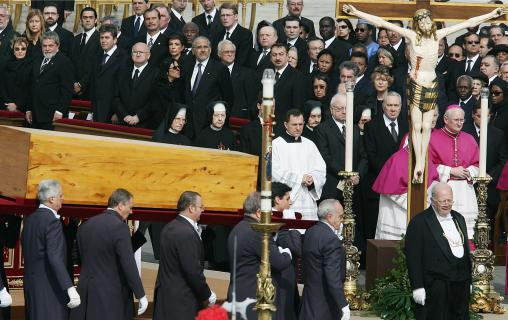
Funeral of Pope John Paul II (Catholic Church)

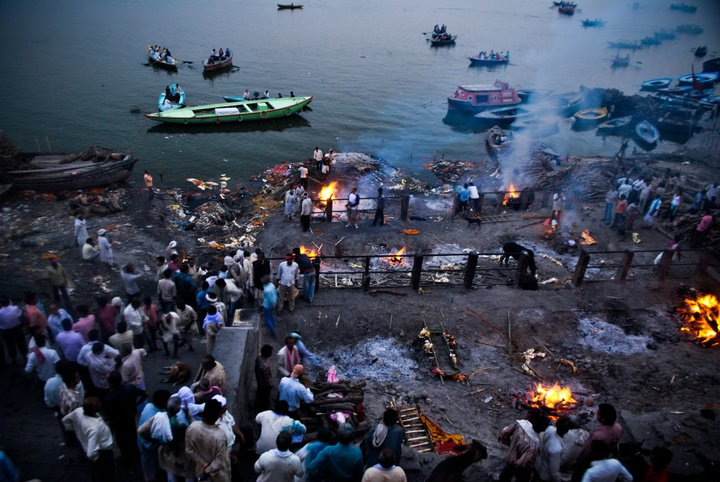
Cremations at Manikarnika Ghat (Hindu)

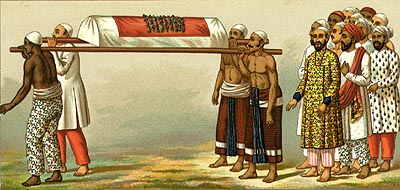
Funeral procession in India (Islam)

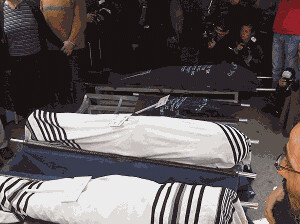
Tallit shrouds (Judaism)

A funeral is a ceremony connected with the final disposition of a corpse, such as a burial, entombment or cremation with the attendant observances. Funerary customs comprise the complex of beliefs and practices used by a culture to remember and respect the dead, from interment, to various monuments, prayers, and rituals undertaken in their honour. Customs vary between cultures and religious groups. Funerals have both normative and legal components. Common secular motivations for funerals include mourning the deceased, celebrating their life, and offering support and sympathy to the bereaved; additionally, funerals may have religious aspects that are intended to help the soul of the deceased reach the afterlife, resurrection or reincarnation.

The funeral usually includes a ritual through which the corpse receives a final disposition. Depending on culture and religion, these can involve either the destruction of the body (for example, by cremation, sky burial, decomposition, disintegration or dissolution) or its preservation (for example, by mummification). Differing beliefs about cleanliness and the relationship between body and soul are reflected in funerary practices. A memorial service or celebration of life is a funerary ceremony that is performed without the remains of the deceased person. In both a closed casket funeral and a memorial service, photos of the deceased representing stages of life may be displayed on an altar. Relatives or friends may give out eulogies in both services as well.

Funerary art is art produced in connection with burials, including many kinds of tombs, and objects specially made for burial like flowers with a corpse.

== Etymology ==
The word funeral comes from the Latin funus, meaning funeral, by way of the Old French funeraille.

== Overview ==
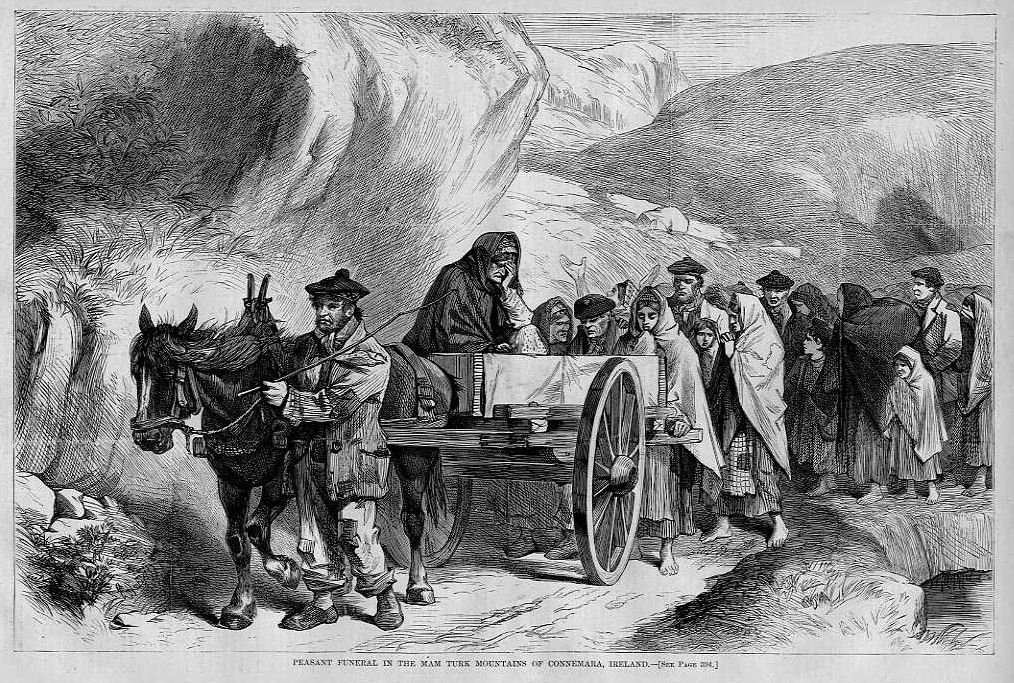
Peasant funeral in the Mam Turk mountains of Connemara, Ireland, 1870

Funeral rites pre-date modern Homo sapiens and date to at least 300,000 years ago. For example, in the Shanidar Cave in Iraq, in Pontnewydd Cave in Wales and at other sites across Europe and the Near East, archaeologists have discovered Neanderthal skeletons with a characteristic layer of flower pollen. This deliberate burial and reverence given to the dead has been interpreted as suggesting that Neanderthals had religious beliefs, although the evidence is not unequivocal – while the dead were apparently buried deliberately, burrowing rodents could have introduced the flowers.

Substantial cross-cultural and historical research document funeral customs as a highly predictable, stable force in communities. Funeral customs tend to be characterized by five "anchors": significant symbols, gathered community, ritual action, cultural heritage, and transition of the dead body (corpse).

== Religious funerals ==
=== Bahá'í ===
In the Baháʼí Faith, burial law prescribes both the location of burial and burial practices and precludes cremation of the dead. It is forbidden to carry the body more than one hour's journey away from the place of death. Before interment, the body should be wrapped in a shroud of silk or cotton, and a ring should be placed on its finger bearing the inscription "I came forth from God, and return unto Him, detached from all save Him, holding fast to His Name, the Merciful, the Compassionate". The coffin should be of crystal, stone or hard fine wood. Also, before interment, a specific Prayer for the Dead is ordained. The body should be placed with the feet facing the Qiblih. The formal prayer and the ring are meant to be used for those who have reached 15 years of age. Since there are no Bahá'í clergy, services are usually conducted under the guidance, or with the assistance of, a local Spiritual Assembly.

=== Buddhist ===
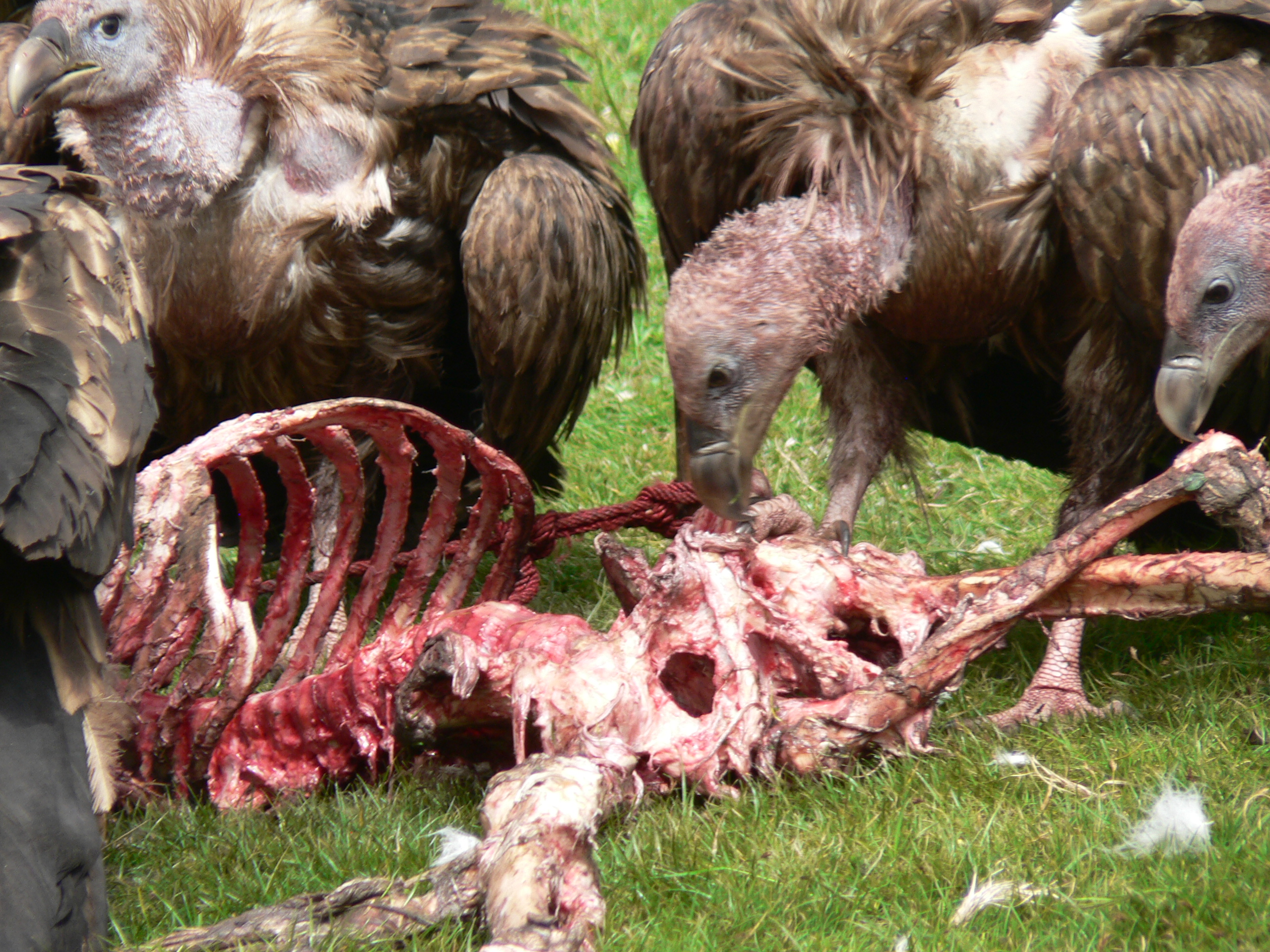
Vultures feeding on a human corpse in a sky burial

In many Buddhist traditions, funerals are intended not only to commemorate the deceased but also to assist their transition into a future rebirth. Merit-making activities, ritual chanting, and offerings are commonly performed on behalf of the dead. In Theravada Buddhist funerals, monks also commonly chant scriptural verses to remind mourners of the impermanence and suffering of life. In Tibetan Buddhism, death is often understood as a transitional process rather than a final ending, and religious practice is believed to influence the deceased's journey and future rebirth. Cremation is the preferred choice, although burial is also allowed. Buddhists in Tibet perform sky burials, where the body is exposed to be eaten by vultures. The body is dissected with a blade on the mountain top before the exposure. Crying and wailing is discouraged and the rogyapas (body breakers who perform the ritual) laugh as if they are doing farm work. Tibetan Buddhists believe that a lighthearted atmosphere during the funeral helps the soul of the dead to get a better afterlife. After the vultures consume all the flesh, the rogpyas smash the bones into pieces and mix them with tsampa to feed to the vultures. In Tibetan Buddhism, signs such as retained bodily warmth and delayed decomposition may be interpreted as evidence of spiritual accomplishment and a "good death".

=== Christian ===
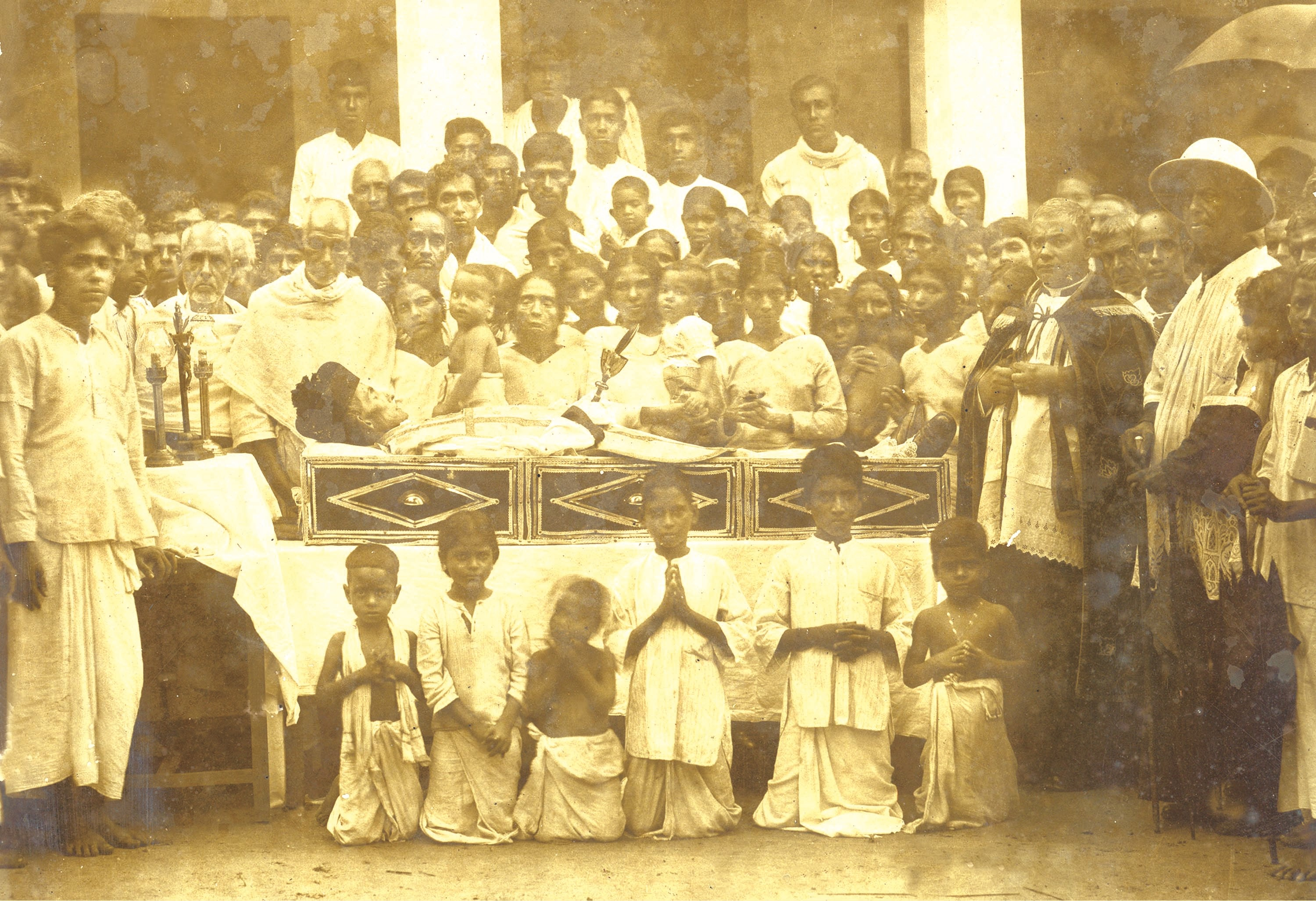
Funeral of Indian Syro-Malabar Catholic, Venerable Varghese Payyappilly Palakkappilly on 6 October 1929

Congregations of various Christian denominations perform different funeral ceremonies, but most involve offering prayers, scripture reading from the Bible, a sermon, homily, or eulogy, and music. One issue of concern, emerging at the beginning of the 21st century, was the increasing use of secular music at Christian funerals, a practice generally forbidden by the Catholic Church.

Christian burials have traditionally occurred on consecrated ground such as in churchyards. There are many funeral norms in Christianity. Burial, rather than cremation, has been the traditional practice amongst Christians, because of the belief in the resurrection of the body. Although cremation has been increasingly common, some denominations forbid them. The US Conference of Catholic Bishops states: "The Church earnestly recommends that the pious custom of burying the bodies of the deceased be observed; nevertheless, the Church does not prohibit cremation unless it was chosen for reasons contrary to Christian doctrine" (canon 1176.3).

=== Hindu ===
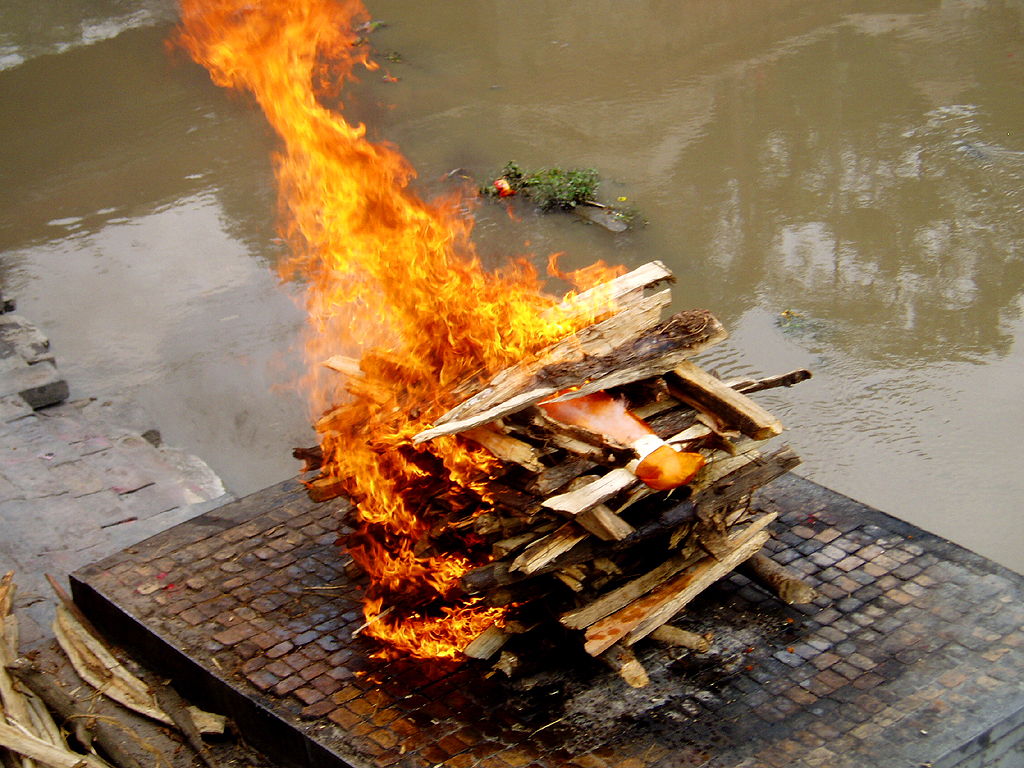
A Hindu cremation rite in Nepal. The samskara above shows the body wrapped in saffron red on a pyre.

Antyesti, literally 'last rites' or 'last sacrifice', refers to the rite-of-passage rituals associated with a funeral in Hinduism.

A dead adult Hindu is cremated, while a dead child is typically buried. The rite of passage is said to be performed in harmony with the sacred premise that the microcosm of all living beings is a reflection of a macrocosm of the universe. The soul (Atman, Brahman) is believed to be the immortal essence that is released at the Antyeshti ritual, but both the body and the universe are vehicles and transitory in various schools of Hinduism. They consist of five elements: air, water, fire, earth and space. The last rite of passage returns the body to the five elements and origins.

The final rites of a burial, in case of untimely death of a child, is rooted in Rigveda section 10.18, where the hymns mourn the death of the child, praying to the deity Mrityu to "neither harm our girls nor our boys", and pleads for the earth to cover and protect the deceased child as a soft wool.

Among Hindus, the dead body is usually cremated within a day of death. In Hindu tradition, the body is usually kept at home with the family until it is time for cremation. A typical Hindu funeral includes three main stages: a gathering or wake in the home, the cremation itself (the mukhagni) and a follow-up ritual called the shraddha ceremony. The body is washed, wrapped in white cloth for a man or a widow and red for a married woman, the two toes tied together with a string and a Tilak (red mark) placed on the forehead. The dead adult's body is carried by family and friends to the cremation ground near a river or water and placed on a pyre with feet facing south. The eldest son, male mourner, or a priest then bathes before leading the cremation ceremonial function. He circumambulates the dry wood pyre with the body, says a eulogy or recites a hymn, places sesame seed in the dead person's mouth, sprinkles the body and the pyre with ghee (clarified butter), then draws three lines signifying Yama (the deity of the dead), Kala (time, the deity of cremation) and the dead. The pyre is then set ablaze, while the mourners mourn. The ash from the cremation is consecrated to the nearest river or sea. After the cremation, a period of mourning is observed for 10 to 12 days, after which the immediate male relatives or the sons of the deceased shave their head, trim their nails, recites prayers with the help of priest or Brahmin and invite all relatives, kins, friends and neighbours to eat a simple meal together in remembrance of the deceased. During the mourning period, sleeping arrangements in the home change too. Mattresses are taken off the beds and placed on the floor and, for twelve days, everyone in the household sleeps on the floor as part of the funeral customs. This day, in some communities, also marks a day when the poor and needy are offered food in memory of the dead. In most Hindu communities, the last day of the mourning is called Terahveen (the thirteenth day) and, on this day, items of basic needs, along with some favourite items of the deceased, are donated to the priests. On the same day, the eldest son of the family is ceremonially crowned (Pagdi Rasm), for he is now the head of the family. A feast is also organised for Brahmins, family members, and friends.

=== Zoroastrian ===
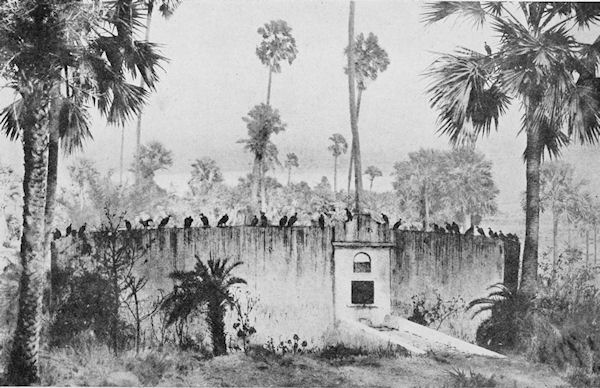
Parsi Tower of Silence, Bombay

The belief that bodies are infested by Nasu upon death greatly influenced Zoroastrian burial ceremonies and funeral rites. Burial and cremation of corpses was prohibited, as such acts would defile the sacred creations of earth and fire respectively. Burial of corpses was so looked down upon that the exhumation of "buried corpses was regarded as meritorious." For these reasons, "Towers of Silence" were developed—open air, amphitheater like structures in which corpses were placed so carrion-eating birds could feed on them.

Sagdīd, meaning 'seen by a dog,' is a ritual that must be performed as promptly after death as possible. The dog is able to calculate the degree of evil within the corpse, and entraps the contamination so it may not spread further, expelling Nasu from the body. Nasu remains within the corpse until it has been seen by a dog, or until it has been consumed by a dog or a carrion-eating bird. According to chapter 31 of the Denkard, the reasoning for the required consumption of corpses is that the evil influences of Nasu are contained within the corpse until, upon being digested, the body is changed from the form of nasa into nourishment for animals. The corpse is thereby delivered over to the animals, changing from the state of corrupted nasa to that of hixr, which is "dry dead matter" and is considered to be less polluting.

A path through which a funeral procession has traveled must not be passed again, as Nasu haunts the area thereafter, until the proper rites of banishment are performed. Nasu is expelled from the area only after "a yellow dog with four eyes, or a white dog with yellow ears" is walked through the path three times. If the dog goes unwillingly down the path, it must be walked back and forth up to nine times to ensure that Nasu has been driven off.

The Zoroastrian ritual exposure of the dead is first known of from the writings of the mid-5th century BCE Herodotus, who observed the custom amongst Iranian expatriates in Asia Minor. In Herodotus' account (Histories i.140), the rites are said to have been "secret", but were first performed after the body had been dragged around by a bird or dog. The corpse was then embalmed with wax and laid in a trench.

While the discovery of ossuaries in both eastern and western Iran dating to the 5th and 4th centuries BCE indicates that bones were isolated, that this separation occurred through ritual exposure cannot be assumed: burial mounds, where the bodies were wrapped in wax, have also been discovered. The tombs of the Achaemenid emperors at Naqsh-e Rustam and Pasargadae likewise suggest non-exposure, at least until the bones could be collected. According to legend (incorporated by Ferdowsi into his Shahnameh), Zoroaster is himself interred in a tomb at Balkh, in present-day Afghanistan.

Writing on the culture of the Persians, Herodotus reports on the Persian burial customs performed by the Magi, which are kept secret. However, he writes that he knows they expose the body of male dead to dogs and birds of prey, then cover the corpse in wax, then bury in. The Achaemenid custom for the dead has been recorded in the regions of Bactria, Sogdia, and Hyrcania, but not in Western Iran.

The Byzantine historian, Agathias, described the burial of the Sasanian general Mihr-Mihroe: "the attendants of Mermeroes took up his body and removed it to a place outside the city and laid it there as it was, alone and uncovered according to their traditional custom, as refuse for dogs and horrible carrion".

Towers are a much later invention and are first documented in the early 9th century CE. The ritual customs surrounding that practice appear to date to the Sassanid era (3rd–7th century CE).

=== Islamic ===
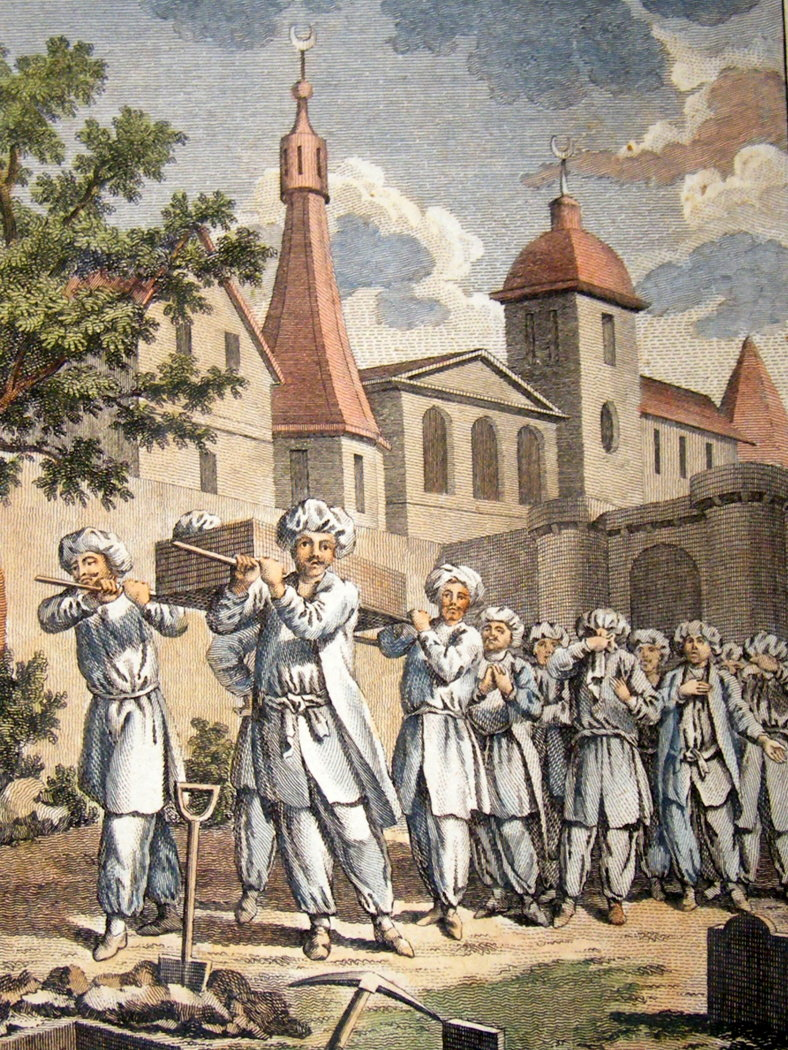
1779 Algerian funerals

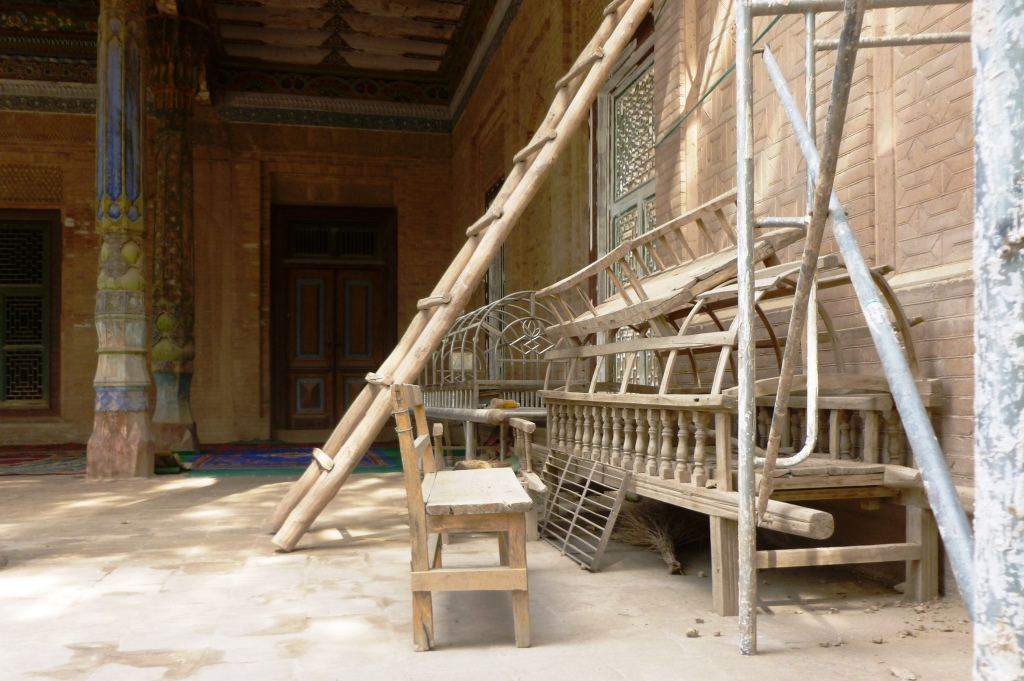
Equipment for washing and preparing bodies at Afaq khoja Mosque, Kashgar

Funerals in Islam (called Janazah in Arabic) follow fairly specific rites. In all cases, sharia (Islamic religious law) calls for the burial of the body, preceded by a simple ritual involving bathing and shrouding the body, followed by salat (Islamic funeral prayer).

Five practices are typical of Muslim funerary practices:

- Ghusl: Bathing the dead body with water, camphor and leaves of ziziphus lotus, except in extraordinary circumstances, such as in battle.
- Takfin: Enshrouding the dead body in a white cotton or linen cloth, except in extraordinary cases such as battle. In such cases, the apparel of corpse is not changed.
- Salat al-janaza: Reciting the funeral prayer.
- Dafn: Burying the dead body in a grave (neither cremation or embalming are allowed).
- Ihdad/hidad: Positioning the deceased so that, when the face or body is turned to the right side, it faces Mecca.

The mourning period is 40 days long.

Burial is the prescribed and traditionally accepted method for the disposal of human remains. This practice is grounded in Qur'anic teachings that emphasize bodily resurrection on the Day of Judgment and the continuation of life in the Hereafter. Islamic traditions regards the grave as the first stage of the afterlife, giving burial both ritual and theological significance. A central element of Islamic belief concerning funeral rites is the questioning of the deceased in the grave, during which the individual is affirmed in faith in God and loyalty to the teachings of the Prophet. Consequently, Islamic teachings prohibit cremation and discourage artificial treatment or alteration of the body after death. Instead, the deceased is buried and allowed to undergo natural decomposition in the earth in accordance with religious principles.

=== Jewish ===
In Judaism, funerals generally follow prescribed rites, although customs vary among different communities and localities. Halakha requires preparatory rituals involving bathing and shrouding the body accompanied by prayers and readings from the Hebrew Bible, a funeral service consisting of eulogies and brief prayers, and then the lowering of the body into the grave and the filling of the grave. Traditional law and practice prohibit cremation; however, the Reform Jewish movement generally discourages cremation but does not outright forbid it.

Burial rites are advised to take place as soon as possible and include:

- Tahara denotes preparation of the body for burial, which entails ritually bathing and shrouding the body, thereby cleansing the body of any impurities of death. Men are shrouded with a kittel and then (outside the Land of Israel) with a tallit (shawl), while women are shrouded in a plain white cloth.
- Keeping watch over the dead body.
- Conducting a funeral service, including eulogies and brief prayers.
- Burying the dead body in a grave.
- Filling the grave, traditionally done by family members and other participants at the funeral.

In many communities, the deceased is positioned so that the feet face the Temple Mount in Jerusalem, so that the deceased will be facing the reconstructed Third Temple when the Messiah arrives and resurrects the dead.

=== Sikh ===
In Sikhism, death is considered a natural process, an event of absolute certainty that occurs only as a direct result of God's Will, or Hukam. Sikhs view birth and death as closely interconnected, as both are part of the cycle of human life of "coming and going" (Punjabi: ਆਵਣੁ ਜਾਣਾ, romanized: Aana Jaana). This cycle is regarded as a transient stage towards Liberation (ਮੋਖੁ ਦੁਆਰੁ, Mokh Du-aar), which is understood as complete union with God. Death is therefore seen no as an end, but as a progression of the soul on its journey from God, through the created universe, and back to God again.

Sikhs believe in reincarnation. During life, a Sikh is expected to remain constantly aware of death so that they may cultivate prayerfulness, detachment and righteousness, thereby breaking the cycle of birth and death and returning to God.

The public display of grief through wailing or crying out loud during the funeral (called Antam Sanskar) is discouraged and should be kept to a minimum. Cremation is the preferred method of disposal, although burial and burial at sea are also allowed if by necessity or by the wishes of the deceased. Permanent memorials, such as gravestones and monuments, are not allowed, because the body is considered to be just the shell and the person's soul is their real self.

The funeral should take place soon after the death and consists of a series of ceremonies:

- Dharti tey pauna, where the body is lifted from the bed and placed on the ground,
- Antam ishnan, the body undergoes the last bath,
- Modha dena, the body is carried out on a bier,
- Dhamalak bhanana, an earthen pit is broken,
- Agni bhaint, ritual offerings to Agni,
- Phul chugna, where the ashes are collected,
- Pagri, a ritual symbolising the transfer to paternal authority,
- Akath, a ritual meal.

The two prayers that must be recited are the Areas and the Kirtan Sohila. On the day of the cremation, the body is washed and dressed and then taken to the Gurdwara or home where hymns (Shabads) from Sri Guru Granth Sahib Ji, the Sikh scriptures, are recited by the congregation. Kirtan may also be performed by Ragis, while the relatives of the deceased recite "Waheguru" while sitting near the coffin. This service normally takes from 30 to 60 minutes. At the conclusion of the service, an Ardas is said before the coffin is taken to the cremation site.

At the point of cremation, a few more Shabads may be sung and final speeches are made about the deceased person. The eldest son or a close relative generally lights the fire. This service usually lasts about 30 to 60 minutes. The ashes are later collected and disposed of by immersing them in a river. Some families may take the ashes to one of the five rivers in the state of Punjab, India, but this not a religious requirement.

The ceremony in which the Sidharan Paath is begun, after the cremation ceremony, may be held when convenient, wherever the Sri Guru Granth Sahib Ji is present.

Hymns are sung from Sri Guru Granth Sahib Ji, and the first five and final verses of "Anand Sahib" and the "Song of Bliss," are recited or sung. The first five verses of Sikhism's morning prayer, "Japji Sahib", are read aloud to begin the Sidharan paath. A hukam, or random verse, is then read from Sri Guru Granth Sahib Ji. Ardas, a prayer, is offered, and Prashad, a sacred sweet, is distributed. Langar, a meal, is then served to guests.

While the Sidharan Paath is being read, the family may also sing hymns daily. Reading may take as long as needed to complete the Paath.

This ceremony is followed by Sahaj Paath Bhog, the Kirtan Sohila (night time prayer) is recited for one week, and finally an Ardas called the "Antim Ardas" ("Final Prayer") is offered in the last week.

=== Celtic ===
It was custom for an officiant to walk in front of the coffin with a horse's skull; this tradition was still observed by Welsh peasants up until the 19th century.

== Western funerals ==
=== Classical antiquity ===
==== Ancient Greece ====
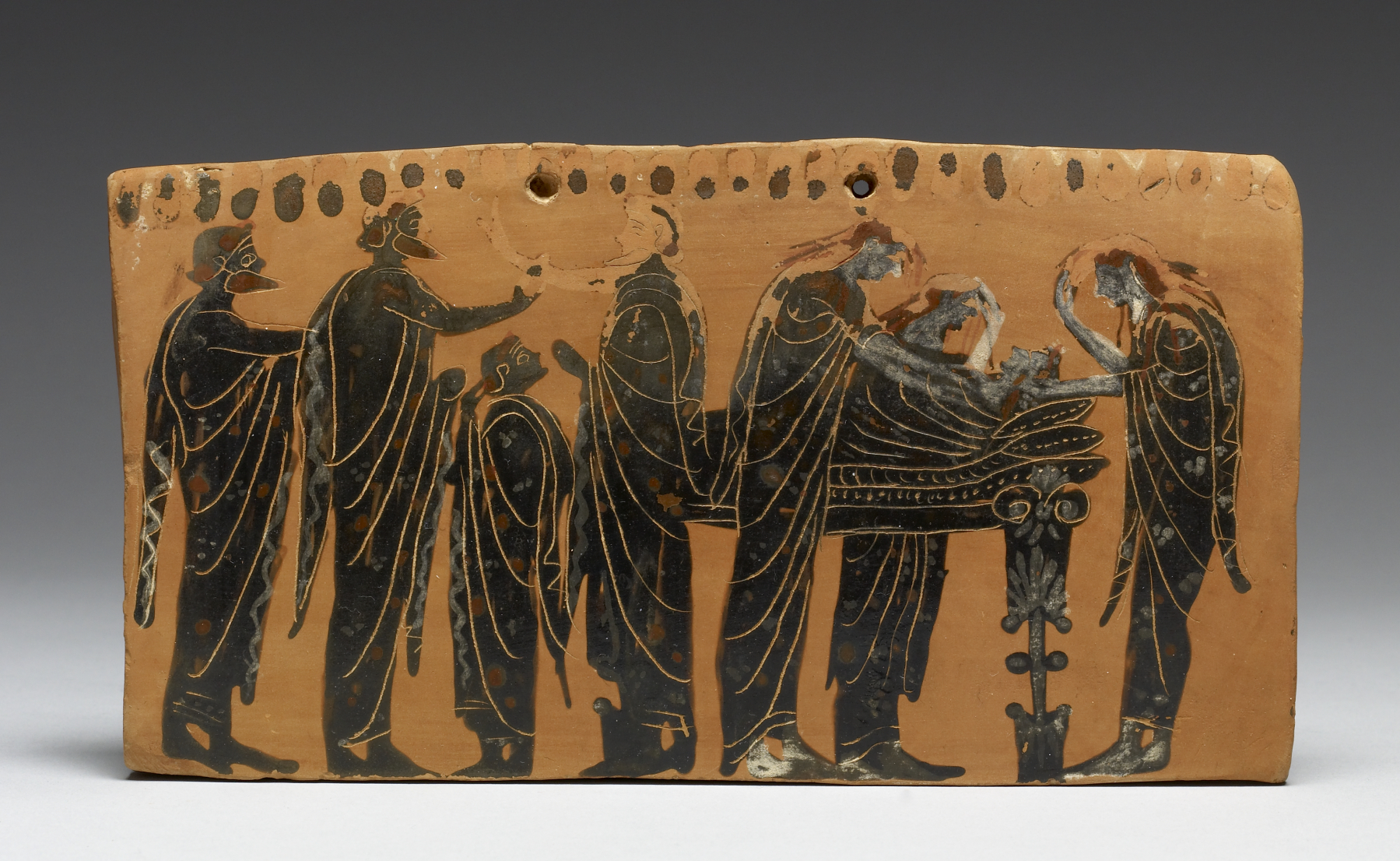
The lying in state of a body (prothesis) attended by family members, with the women ritually tearing their hair (Attic, latter 6th century BCE)

The Greek word for funeral – κηδεία, kedeia – derives from the verb κήδομαι, kedomai, which means attend to or take care of someone. Derivative words include κηδεμών, kedemon, 'guardian' and κηδεμονία, kedemonia, 'guardianship'. From the Cycladic civilization in 3000 BCE until the Hypo-Mycenaean era in 1200–1100 BCE, the main practice of burial was interment. The cremation of the dead, that appeared around the 11th century BCE, constituted a new practice of burial and was probably the result of an eastern influence. Until the Christian era, when interment became the only allowed burial practice again, both cremation and interment were practiced, depending on the area.

The ancient Greek funeral, since the Homeric era, included the πρόθεσις, prothesis, the ἐκφορά, ekphora, and the περίδειπνον, perideipnon. In most cases, this process is followed faithfully in Greece today.

Próthesis is the deposition of the body of the deceased on the funeral bed and the threnody of their relatives. Today, the body is placed in the casket, which is always open in Greek funerals. This part takes place in the house where the deceased had lived. An important part of the Greek tradition is the epicedium, the mournful songs that are sung by the family of the deceased, along with professional mourners (who are extinct in the modern era). The deceased was watched over by their beloved the entire night before the burial, an obligatory ritual which is maintained still.

Ekphorá is the process of transporting the mortal remains of the deceased from their residence to the church (nowadays) and, afterward, to the place of burial. The procession in the ancient times, according to the law, should pass silently through the streets of the city. Usually, certain favourite objects of the deceased were placed in the coffin in order to "go along with him". In certain regions, coins to pay Charon, who ferried the dead to the underworld, were also placed inside the casket. A last kiss was given to the beloved dead by the family before the coffin was closed.

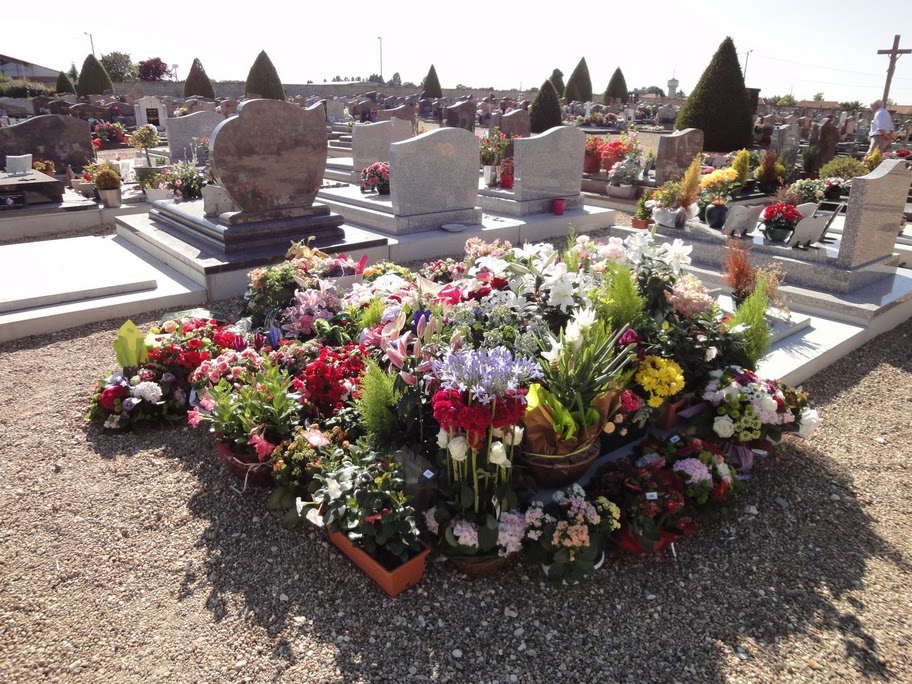
Funeral with flowers on marble

The Roman orator Cicero describes the habit of planting flowers around the tomb in an effort to guarantee the repose of the deceased and the purification of the ground, a custom that is maintained until today. After the ceremony, the mourners return to the house of the deceased for the perídeipnon, the dinner after the burial. According to archaeological findings – traces of ash, bones of animals, shards of crockery, dishes and basins – the dinner, during the classical era, was also organized at the burial spot. According to written sources, however, the dinner could also be served in the houses.

The Νεκρόδειπνον, nekrodeipnon was the funeral banquet which was given at the house of the nearest relative.

Two days after the burial, a ceremony called "the thirds" was held. Eight days after the burial, the relatives and the friends of the deceased assembled at the burial spot, where "the ninths" would take place, a custom still followed. In addition to this, in the modern era, memorial services take place 40 days, 3 months, 6 months, 9 months and 1 year after the death and, from then, on every year on the anniversary of the death. The relatives of the deceased are in mourning for an unspecified length of time, that depends on the person, during which women wear black clothes and men a black armband.

Νεκύσια, nekysia, meaning "the day of the dead", and Γενέσια, genesia, meaning "the day of the forefathers" (ancestors), were yearly feasts in honour of the dead.

Νεμέσια, nemesia (or Nεμέσεια, nemeseia) was also a yearly feast in honour of the dead, most probably intended for averting the anger of the dead.

==== Ancient Rome ====
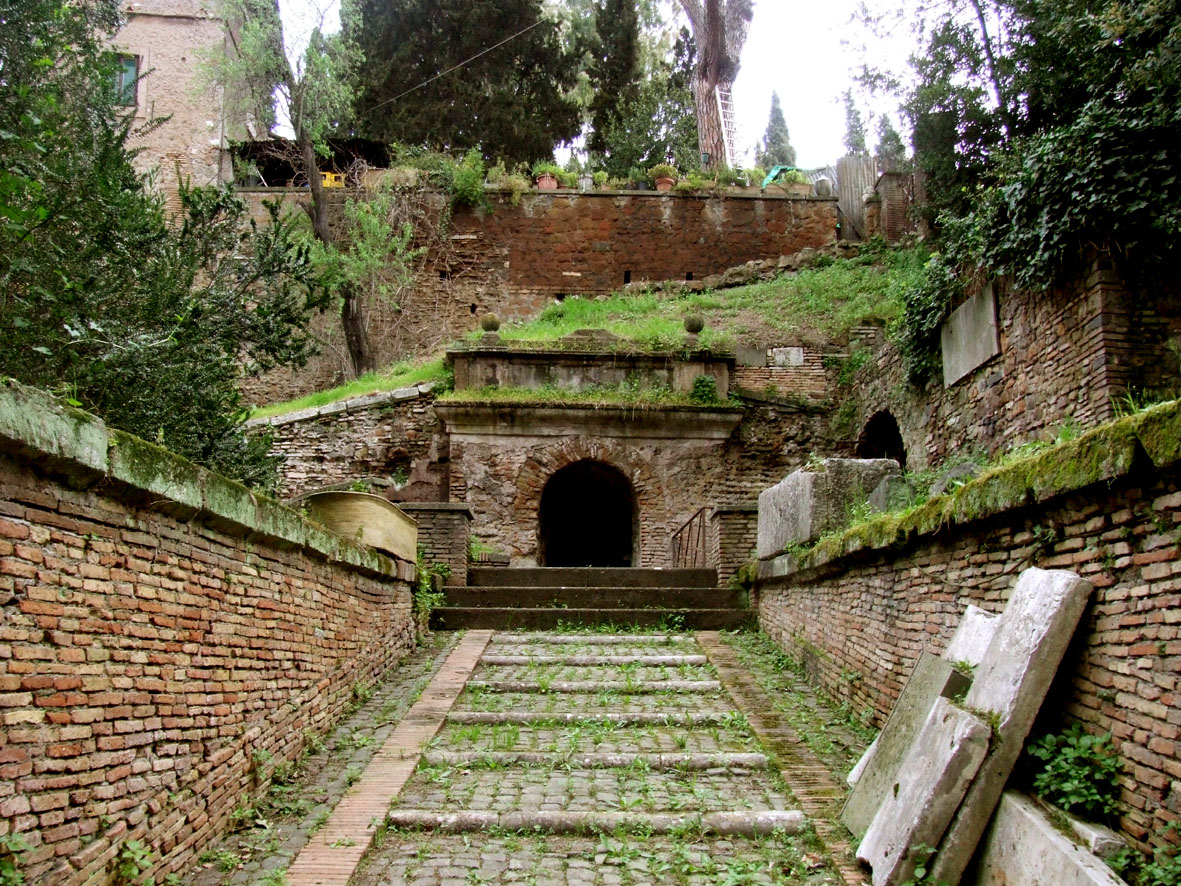
Tomb of the Scipios, in use from the 3rd century BCE to the 1st century CE

In ancient Rome, the eldest surviving male of the household, the pater familias, was summoned to the death-bed, where he attempted to catch and inhale the last breath of the decedent.

Funerals of the socially prominent usually were undertaken by professional undertakers called libitinarii. No direct description has been passed down of Roman funeral rites. These rites usually included a public procession to the tomb or pyre, where the body was to be cremated. The surviving relations bore masks bearing the images of the family's deceased ancestors. The right to carry the masks in public was eventually restricted to families prominent enough to have held curule magistracies. Mimes, dancers, and musicians hired by the undertakers, and professional female mourners, took part in these processions. Less well-to-do Romans could join benevolent funerary societies (collegia funeraticia) that undertook these rites on their behalf.

Nine days after the disposal of the body, by burial or cremation, a feast was given (cena novendialis) and a libation poured over the grave or the ashes. Since most Romans were cremated, the ashes were typically collected in an urn and placed in a niche in a collective tomb called a columbarium (literally, "dovecote"). During this nine-day period, the house was considered to be tainted (funesta), and was hung with Taxus baccata or Mediterranean Cypress branches to warn passersby. At the end of the period, the house was swept out to symbolically purge it of the taint of death.

Several Roman holidays commemorated a family's dead ancestors, including the Parentalia, held February 13 through 21, to honor the family's ancestors; and the Feast of the Lemures, held on May 9, 11, and 13, in which ghosts (larvae) were feared to be active, and the pater familias sought to appease them with offerings of beans.

The Romans prohibited cremation or inhumation within the sacred boundary of the city (pomerium), for both religious reasons (so that the priests might not be contaminated by touching a dead body) and civil reasons (so that houses would not be endangered by funeral fires).

Restrictions on the length, ostentatiousness, expense of, and behaviour during funerals and mourning were gradually enacted by a variety of lawmakers. Often, the pomp and length of rites could be politically or socially motivated, to advertise or aggrandise a particular kin group in Roman society. This was seen as deleterious to society and conditions for grieving were set. For instance, under some laws, women were prohibited from loud wailing or lacerating their faces and limits were introduced for expenditure on tombs and burial clothes.

The Romans commonly built tombs for themselves during their lifetime. Hence, inscriptions often contained the letters V.F. (Vivus Facit, 'made while alive') or V.S.P. (Vivus Sibi Posuit, 'built for himself while alive'). The tombs of the rich were usually constructed of marble, the ground enclosed with walls, and planted around with trees. Common sepulchres usually were built below ground, and called hypogea. There, niches were cut out of the walls, in which the urns were placed; these, from their resemblance to the niche of a pigeon-house, were called columbaria.

=== North American funerals ===
Within the United States and Canada, in most cultural groups and regions, the funeral rituals can be divided into three parts: visitation, funeral, and the burial service. A home funeral (services prepared and conducted by the family, with little or no involvement from professionals) is legal in nearly every part of North America, but in the 21st century, they are uncommon in the US.

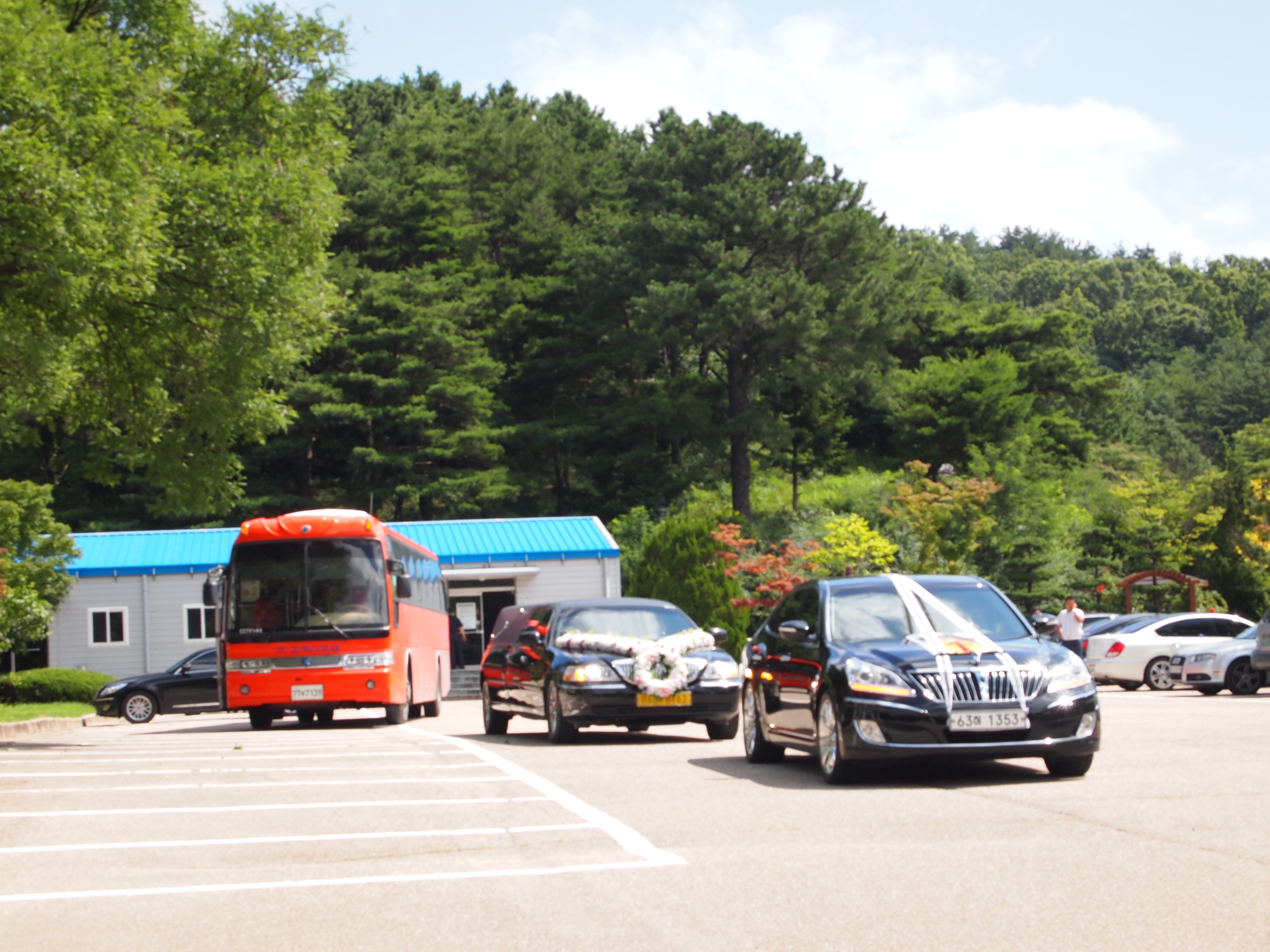
A western-style funeral motorcade for a member of a high-ranking military family in South Korea

==== Visitation ====
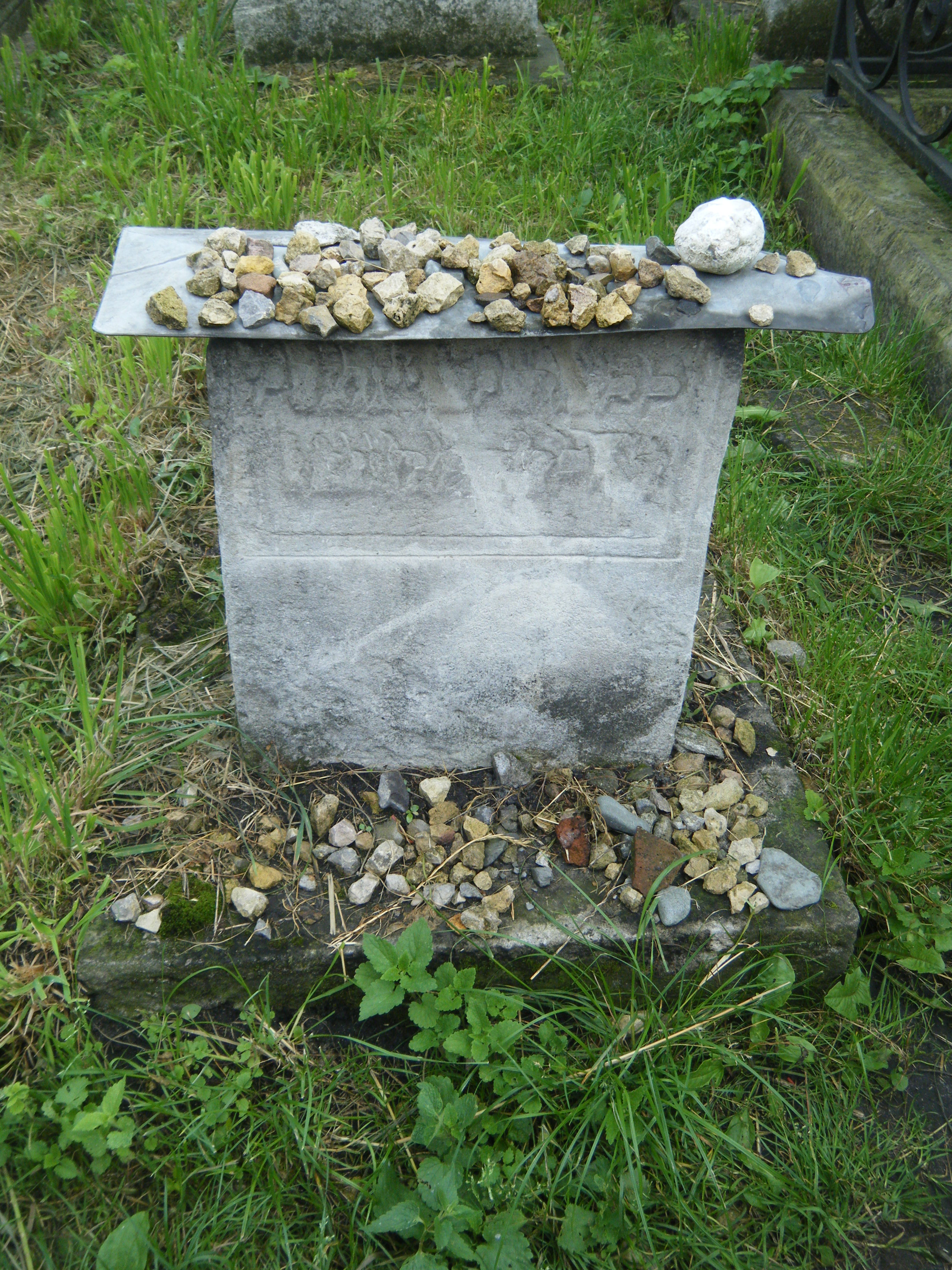
The tombstone of Yossele the Holy Miser. According to Jewish bereavement tradition, the dozens of stones on his tombstone mark respect for the Holy Miser.

Jewish funerals are held soon after death (preferably within a day or two, unless more time is needed for relatives to come), and the corpse is never displayed. Torah law forbids embalming. Traditionally flowers (and music) are not sent to a grieving Jewish family, as it is a reminder of the life that is now lost. The Jewish shiva tradition discourages family members from cooking, so food is brought by friends and neighbors.

The decedent's closest friends and relatives who are unable to attend frequently send flowers to the viewing, with the exception of a Jewish funeral, where flowers would not be appropriate and donations are often given to a charity instead.

Obituaries sometimes contain a request that attendees do not send flowers (e.g. "In lieu of flowers"). The use of these phrases has been on the rise for the past century. In the US in 1927, only 6% of the obituaries included the directive, with only 2% of those mentioning charitable contributions instead. By the middle of the century, that had grown to 15%, with over 54% of those noting a charitable contribution as the preferred method of expressing sympathy.

==== Funeral ====
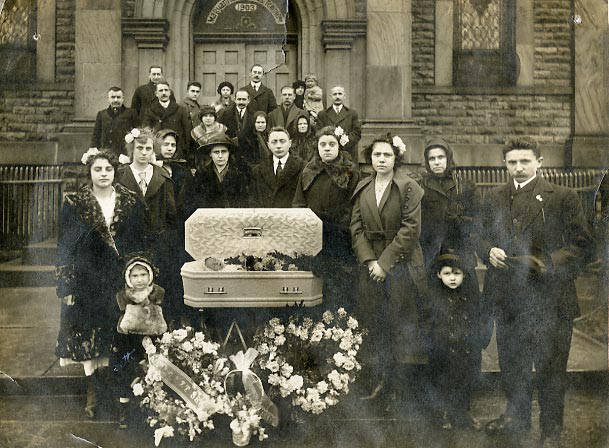
Funeral for a child, 1920

The deceased is usually transported from the funeral home to a church in a hearse, a specialized vehicle designed to carry casketed remains. The deceased is often transported in a procession (also called a funeral cortège), with the hearse, funeral service vehicles, and private automobiles traveling in a procession to the church or other location where the services will be held. In a number of jurisdictions, special laws cover funeral processions, such as requiring most other vehicles to give right-of-way to a funeral procession. Funeral service vehicles may be equipped with light bars and special flashers to increase their visibility on the roads. They may also all have their headlights on, a practice which has roots in ancient Roman customs but also identifies which vehicles are part of the cortege. After the funeral service, if the deceased is to be buried, the funeral procession will proceed to a cemetery if not already there. If the deceased is to be cremated, the funeral procession may then proceed to the crematorium.

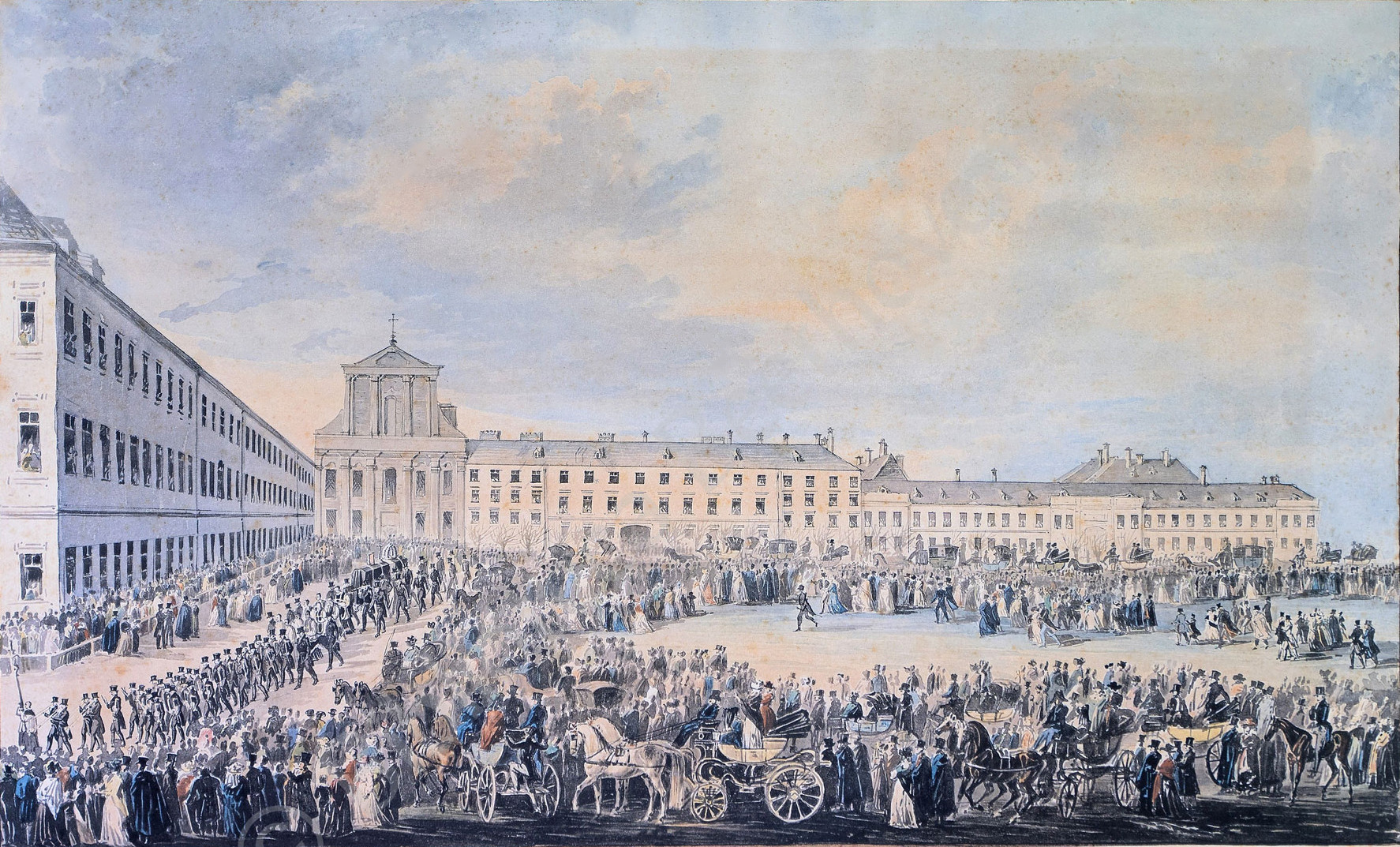
Beethoven's funeral as depicted by Franz Xaver Stöber

Funeral customs vary from country to country. In the United States, any type of noise other than quiet whispering or mourning is considered disrespectful.

A burial tends to cost more than a cremation.

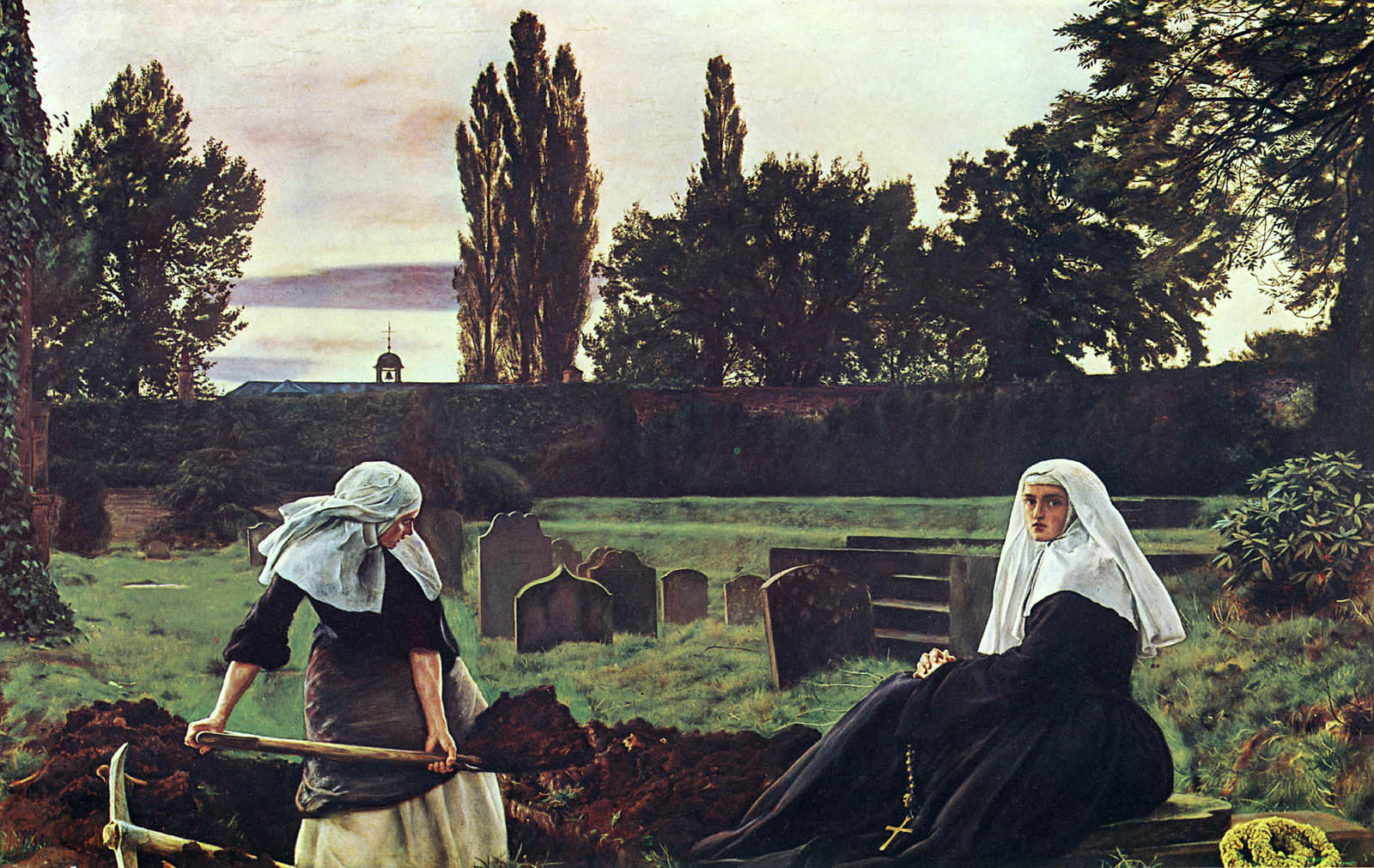
John Everett Millais – The Vale of Rest

If the decedent served in a branch of the Armed forces, military rites are often accorded at the burial service.

In many religious traditions, pallbearers, usually male relatives or friends of the decedent, will carry the casket from the chapel (of a funeral home or church) to the hearse, and from the hearse to the site of the burial service.

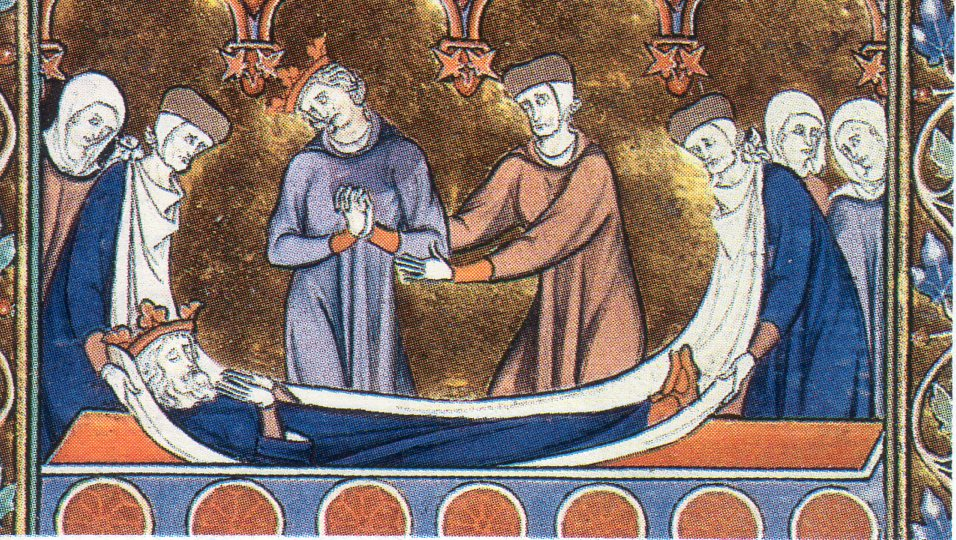
Medieval depiction of a royal body being laid in a coffin

=== Indigenous Americans ===
Funerals for indigenous people, like many other cultures, are a method to remember, commemorate and respect the dead through their own cultural practices and traditions.

In the past, there has been scrutiny when the topic of indigenous funeral sites was approached. Thus, the federal government deemed it necessary to create a series of acts that would protect and accurately affiliate some of these burials with their correct native individuals or groups. This was enacted through the Native American Graves Protection and Repatriation Act.

==== California ====
In 2001, California created the California Native American Graves Protection and Repatriation Act that would "require all state agencies and museums that receive state funding and that have possession or control over collections of humans remains or cultural items to provide a process for identification and repatriates of these items to appropriate tribes." In 2020, it was amended to include tribes that were beyond State and Federal knowledge.

===== Western Yuman region =====
In the Ipai, Tipai, Paipai, and Kiliwa regions, funeral practices are similar in their social and power dynamics. The way that these funeral sites were created was based on previous habitation: they were sites where their peoples may have died or were a temporary home for some of these groups. Additionally, these individual burials were characterized by grave markers and/or grave offerings. The markers included inverted metates and fractured pieces of metates as well as cairns. Offerings included food, shell and stone beads, which have often been found in burial mounds along with human remains.

The state of the human remains found at the site can vary: data suggests that cremations were a more recent practice in prehistory, compared to burials. Ranging from the middle Holocene era to the Late Prehistoric Period. Additionally, the position in which these people were placed shows how the afterlife was viewed. Based on recent ethnographic evidence coming from the Yuman people, it was believed that the spirits of the dead could potentially harm the living, so they would often layer the markers or offerings above the body, so that they would be unable to "leave" their graves and enact harm.

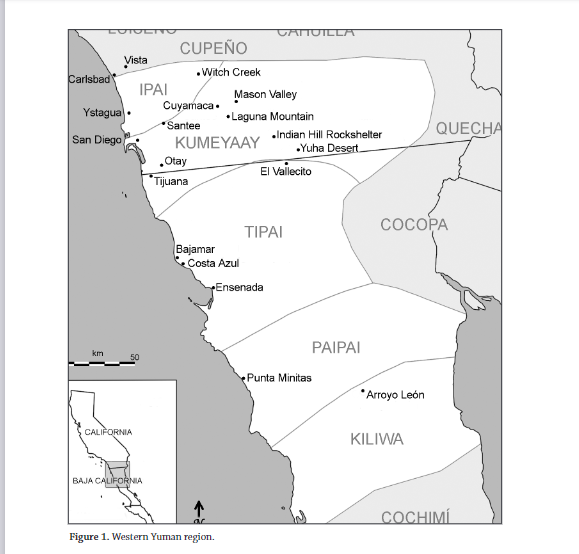
Western Yuman Region, California and Baja California

===== Tongva =====
In the Los Angeles Basin, researchers discovered communal mourning features at West Bluffs and Landing Hill. These communal mourning rituals were estimated to have taken place during the Intermediate Period (3,000-1,000 B.P.). Archaeologists have found fragmented pieces of a large schist pestle which was deliberately broken in a methodical way. Other fragmented vessels show signs of uneven burning on the interior surface, presumed to have been caused by burning combustible material.

In the West Bluffs and Landing Hill assemblages, there are many instances of artifacts that were dyed in red ochre pigment after being broken. The tradition of intentionally breaking objects has been a custom in the region for thousands of years for the purpose of releasing the spirit within the object, reducing harm to the community, or as an expression of grief. Pigmentation of grave goods also has many interpretations: for example, the Chumash associate the color red with both earth and fire. Some researchers consider the usage of the red pigment to be an important transitional moment in the adult life cycle.

=== Memorial services ===
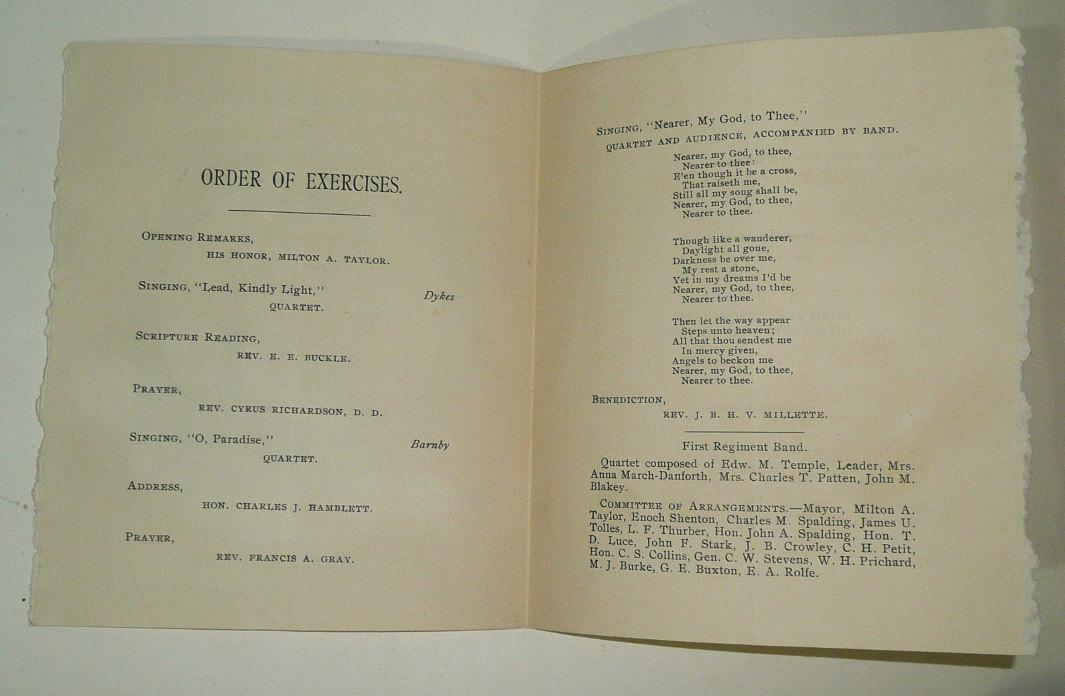
Order of exercises, local memorial service in Nashua, New Hampshire, for U.S. President William McKinley on September 19, 1901, following his assassination

A memorial service or memorial gathering is one given for the deceased, often without the body present. The service takes place after cremation, burial at sea, entombment in a mausoleum's crypt, after donation of the body to an academic or research institution, a traditional burial in a cemetery plot (remains either in a coffin or an urn) or after the ashes have been scattered someplace. It is also significant when the person is missing and presumed dead, or known to be deceased though the body is not recoverable. These services often take place at a funeral home; however, they can be held in a home, cemetery chapel, university, townhouse, country club, restaurant, beach, community center, workplace, place of worship, hospital chapel, health club, performing arts center, wedding chapel, lodge, town hall, civic center, hotel, museum, sports field, pub, urban park or other location of some significance. A memorial service may include speeches (eulogies), prayers, poems, or songs (especially hymns) to commemorate the deceased. Pictures of the deceased and flowers, sometimes with an urn, are usually placed where the coffin would normally be. Families may present a slide show to showcase fond memories of their loved ones, especially in a funeral home or place of worship.

After the sudden deaths of important public officials, public memorial services have been held by communities, including those without any specific connection to the deceased. For examples, community memorial services were held after the assassinations of US presidents James A. Garfield and William McKinley.

=== European funerals ===
==== Finland ====
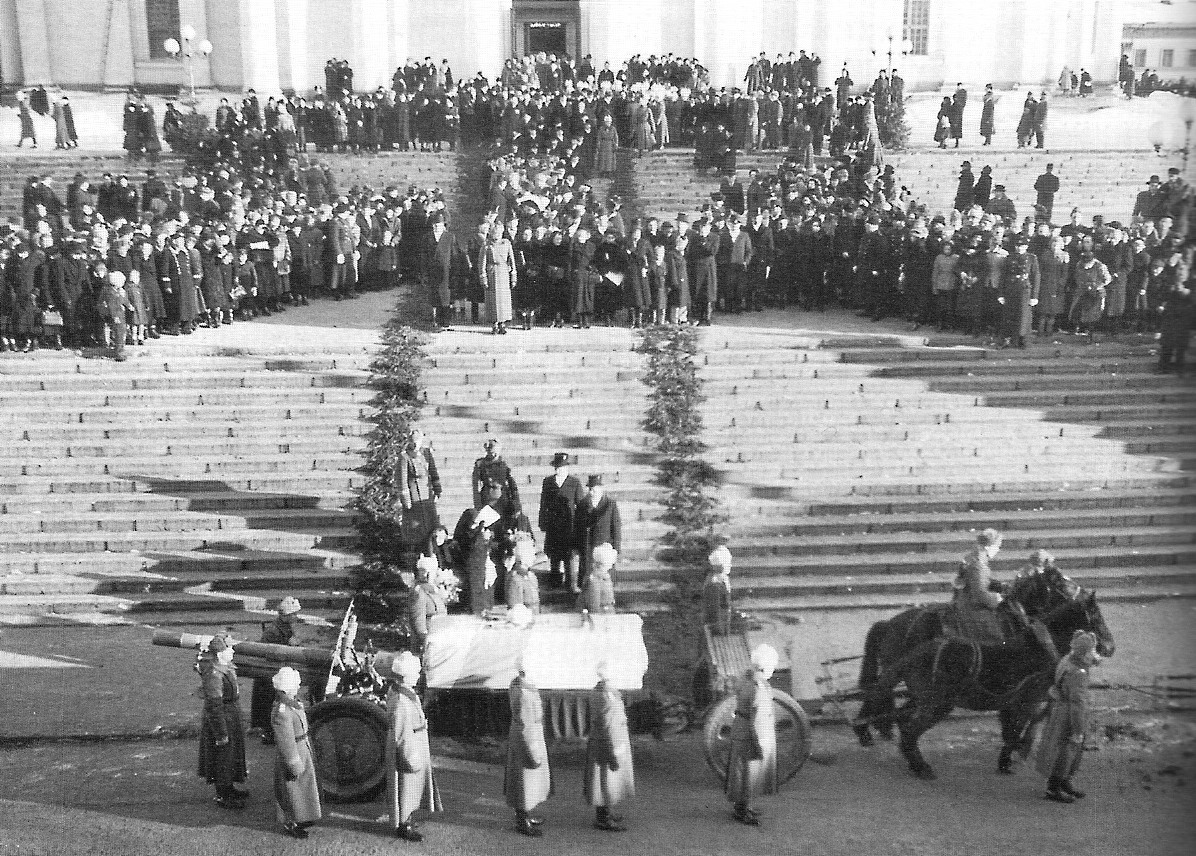
A funeral parade of Marshal Mannerheim in Helsinki, Finland, on February 4, 1951. Helsinki Lutheran Cathedral on the background.

In Finland, religious funerals (hautajaiset) are quite ascetic and typically follow Lutheran traditions. The local priest or minister says prayers and blesses the deceased in their house. The mourners (saattoväki) traditionally bring food to the mourners' house. Common current practice has the deceased placed into the coffin in the place where they died. The undertaker will pick up the coffin and place it in the hearse and drive it to the funeral home, while the closest relatives or friends of the deceased will follow the hearse in a funeral procession in their own cars. The coffin will be held at the funeral home until the day of the funeral. The funeral services may be divided into two part: first is the church service (siunaustilaisuus) in a cemetery chapel or local church, then the burial.

==== Italy ====
The majority of Italians are Roman Catholic and follow Catholic funeral traditions. Historically, mourners would walk in a funeral procession to the gravesite; today, vehicles are used.

==== Greece ====
Greek funerals are generally held in churches, including a Trisagion service. There is usually a 40-day mourning period, at the end of which a memorial service is held. Every year following, a similar service takes place, to mark the anniversary of the death.

==== Poland ====
In Poland, in urban areas, there are usually two, or just one "stop". The body, brought by a hearse from the mortuary, may be taken to a church or to a cemetery chapel. There is then a funeral mass or service at the cemetery chapel. Following the mass or service, the casket is carried in procession (usually on foot) by hearse to the grave. Once at the grave-site, the priest will commence the graveside committal service and the casket is lowered. The mass or service usually takes place at the cemetery.

In some traditional rural areas, the wake (czuwanie) takes place in the house of the deceased or their relatives. The body lies in state for three days in the house. The funeral usually takes place on the third day. Family, neighbors and friends gather and pray during the day and night on those three days and nights. There are usually three stages in the funeral ceremony (ceremonia pogrzebowa, pogrzeb): first, there is the wake, then the body is carried by procession (usually on foot) or people drive in their own cars to the church or cemetery chapel for mass, and then there is another procession by foot to the gravesite.

After the funeral, families gather for a post-funeral get-together (stypa). It can be at the family home, or at a function hall. In Poland, cremation is less popular, because the Catholic Church in Poland prefers traditional burials, although cremation is allowed. Cremation is more popular among non-religious people and Protestants in Poland.

==== Scotland ====
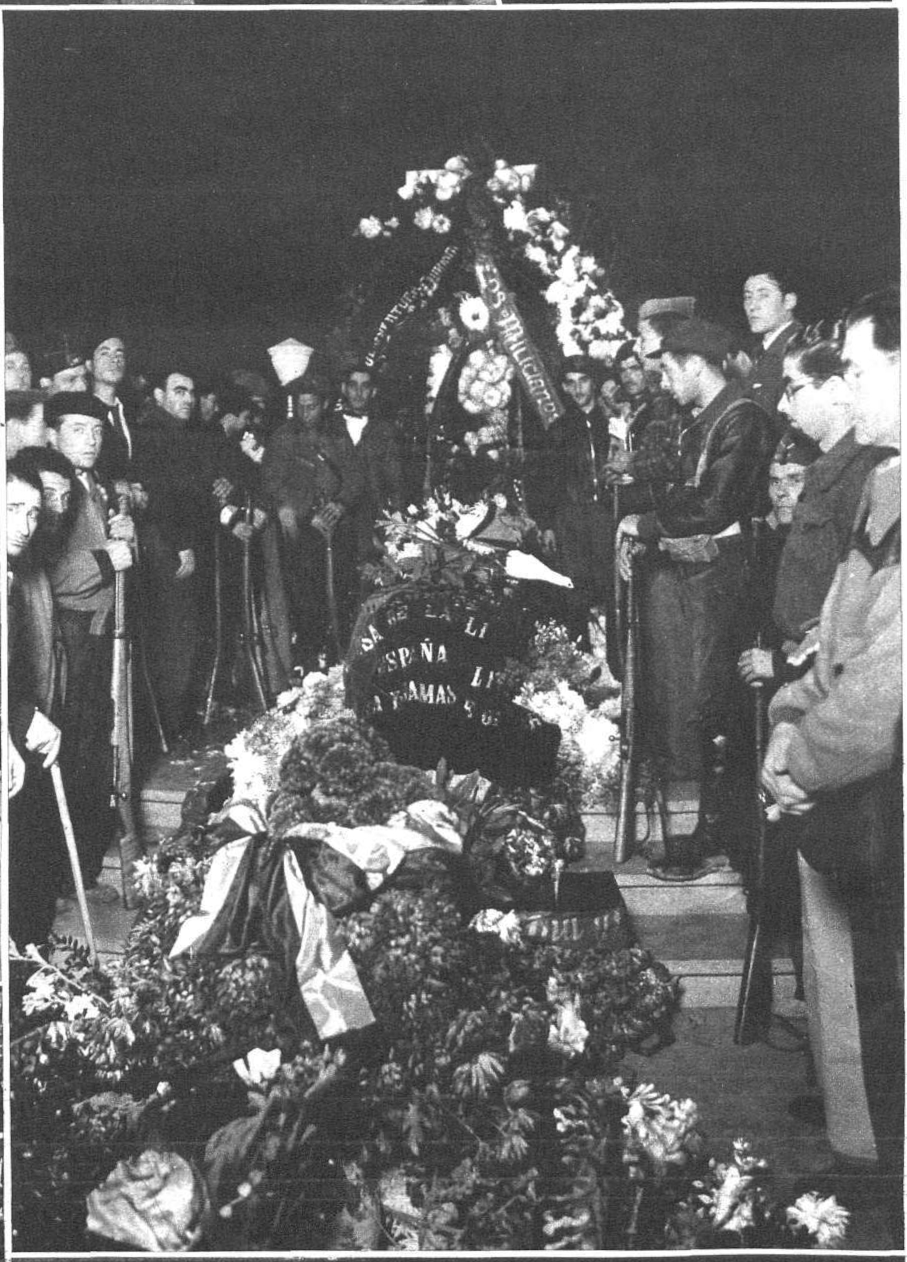
Funeral of Buenaventura Durruti, a major Spanish anarchist, during the Spanish Civil War (1936)

An old funeral rite from the Scottish Highlands involved burying the deceased with a wooden plate resting on his chest. On the plate were placed a small amount of earth and salt, to represent the future of the deceased. The earth hinted that the body would decay and become one with the earth, while the salt represented the soul, which does not decay. This rite was known as "earth laid upon a corpse". This practice was also carried out in Ireland, as well as in parts of England, particularly in Leicestershire, although, in England, the salt was intended to prevent air from distending the corpse.

==== Sweden ====
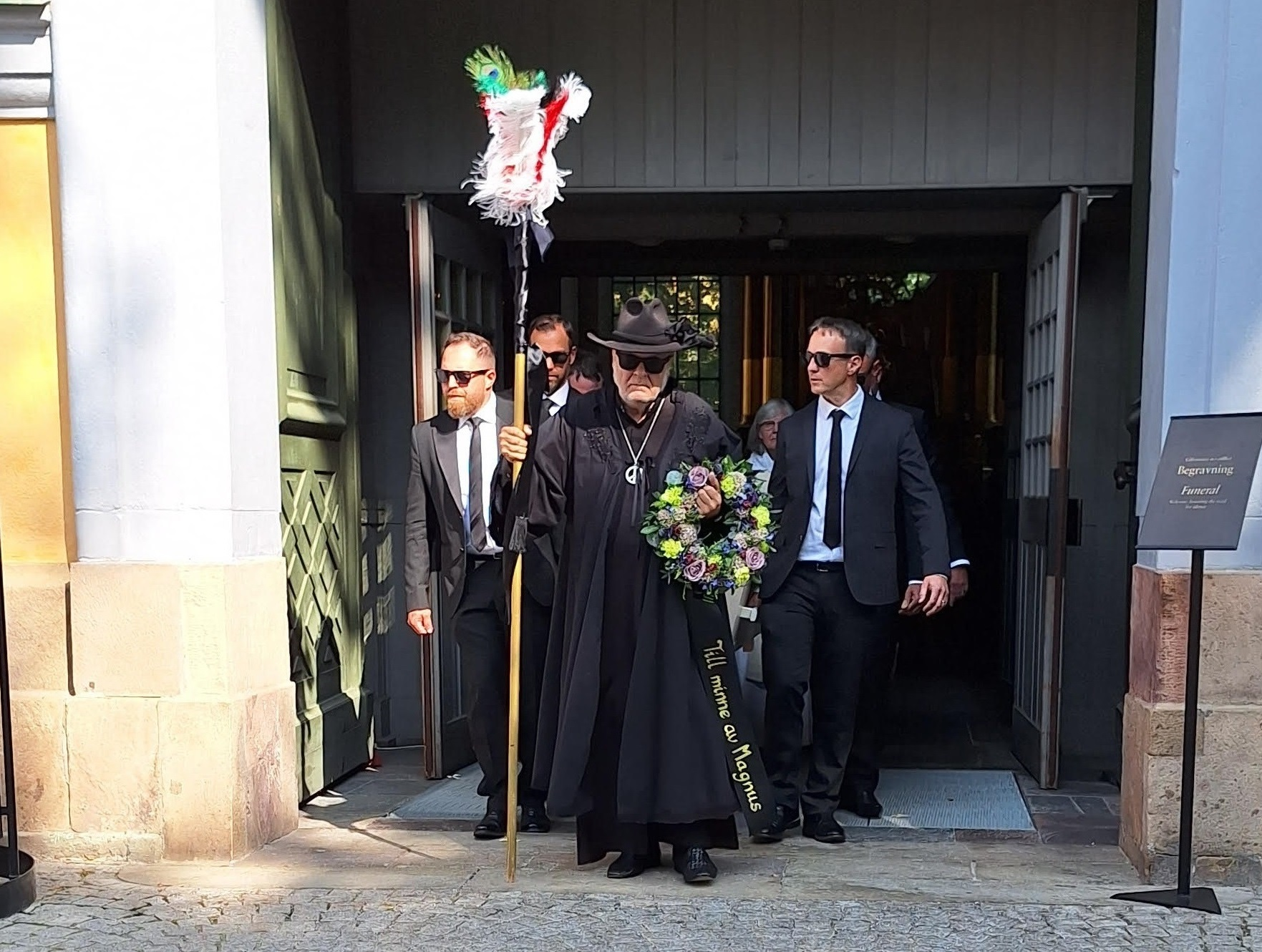
Funeral procession at Katarina Church in Stockholm in 2024

The first Swedish evangelical order of burial was described in Olaus Petri's handbook of 1529. From the medieval order, it had only kept the burial and cremation. The funeral, where the priest blessed the recently deceased and which, after the Reformation, came to be called a reading, was forbidden in the church order of 1686, but was taken over by lay people instead. It was then followed by the wake, which was banned by the church law in 1686, since it was often considered degenerate to have dancing and games where beer and brandy were served. It came, however, to live on in the custom of "singing out corpses". In older times, the grave was often shoveled closed during the hymn singing. During the 17th century, homilies became common, and they were later replaced by grift speeches, although they never became mandatory. In 1686, it was decided that those who had lived a Christian life should be honestly and properly buried in a grave. It also determined that the burial would be performed by a priest in the Church of Sweden, although some religious communities were later given the right to bury their dead themselves. Burial could only take place at a burial site intended for the purpose. Loss of honorable burial became a punishment. A distinction was made between silent burial (for some serious criminals) and quiet burial without singing and bell ringing and with abbreviated ritual (for some criminals, unbaptized children and for those who committed suicide). Church burial was compulsory for members of the Church of Sweden until 1926, when the possibility was opened for civil burial.

==== United Kingdom ====
In the UK, funerals are commonly held at a church, crematorium or cemetery chapel. Historically, it was customary to bury the dead but, since the 1960s, cremation has been more common.

While there is no visitation ceremony like in North America, relatives may view the body beforehand at the funeral home. A room for viewing is usually called a chapel of rest. Funerals typically last about half an hour. They are sometimes split into two ceremonies: a main funeral and a shorter committal ceremony. In the latter, the coffin is either handed over to a crematorium or buried in a cemetery. This allows the funeral to be held at a place without cremation or burial facilities. Alternatively, the entire funeral may be held in the chapel of the crematorium or cemetery. It is not customary to view a cremation; instead, the coffin may be removed from the chapel or hidden with curtains towards the end of the funeral.

After the funeral, it is common for the mourners to gather for refreshments. This is sometimes called a wake, though this is different from how the term is used in other countries, where a wake is a ceremony before the funeral.

==== Wales ====
Traditionally, a good funeral (as they were called) had one draw the curtains for a period of time; at the wake, when new visitors arrived, they would enter from the front door and leave through the back door. The women stayed at home whilst the men attended the funeral, the village priest would then visit the family at their home to talk about the deceased and to console them.

The first child of William Price, a Welsh Neo-Druidic priest, died in 1884. Believing that it was wrong to bury a corpse, and thereby pollute the earth, Price decided to cremate his son's body, a practice which had been common in Celtic societies. The police arrested him for the illegal disposal of a corpse. Price successfully argued in court that, while the law did not state that cremation was legal, it also did not state that it was illegal. The case set a precedent that, together with the activities of the newly founded Cremation Society of Great Britain, led to the Cremation Act 1902. The Act imposed procedural requirements before a cremation could occur and restricted the practice to authorised places.

== Other types of funerals ==
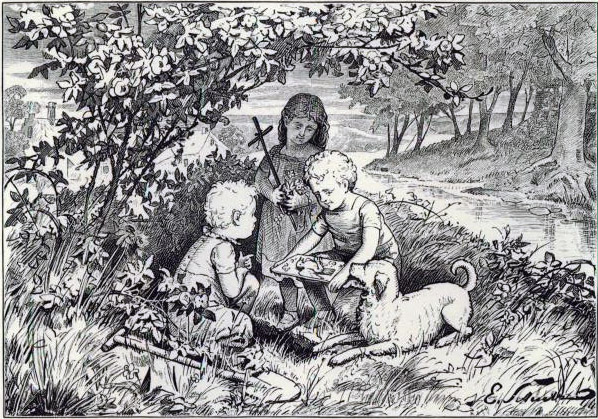
The burial of a bird

=== Celebration of life ===
A growing number of families choose to hold a life celebration or celebration of life event for the deceased. Like memorial services, this ceremony is held after the burial, entombment or cremation of the deceased. An urn can be on display, along with flowers and photos on the altar after cremation, like in a memorial service. Unlike funerals, the focus of the ceremony is on the life that was lived. Such ceremonies may be held outside the funeral home or place of worship: country clubs, lodges, cemetery chapels, restaurants, beaches, performing arts centers, wedding chapels, urban parks, sports fields, hotels, civic centers, museums, hospital chapels, community centers, town halls, pubs and sporting facilities are popular choices, based on the specific interests of the deceased. Celebrations of life focus on the person's best qualities, interests, achievements and impact, rather than mourning a death. Some events are portrayed as joyous parties, instead of a traditional somber funeral. Taking on happy and hopeful tones, celebrations of life discourage wearing black and focus on the deceased's individuality. Like memorial services, families may present a slideshow (both photos and video clips) with fond memories of their loved ones as part of the ceremony. An extreme example might have "a fully stocked open bar, catered food, and even favors." Notable recent celebrations of life ceremonies include those for René Angélil and Maya Angelou.

=== Jazz funeral ===
Originating in New Orleans, Louisiana, U.S., alongside the emergence of jazz music in late 19th and early 20th centuries, the jazz funeral is a traditionally African-American burial ceremony and celebration of life unique to New Orleans, that involves a parading funeral procession accompanied by a brass band playing somber hymns followed by upbeat jazz music. Traditional jazz funerals begin with a processional led by the funeral director, family, friends, and the brass band, i.e., the "main line", who march from the funeral service to the burial site while the band plays slow dirges and Christian hymns. After the body is buried, or "cut loose", the band begins to play up-tempo, joyful jazz numbers, as the main line parades through the streets and crowds of "second liners" join in and begin dancing and marching along, transforming the funeral into a street festival.

=== Green ===
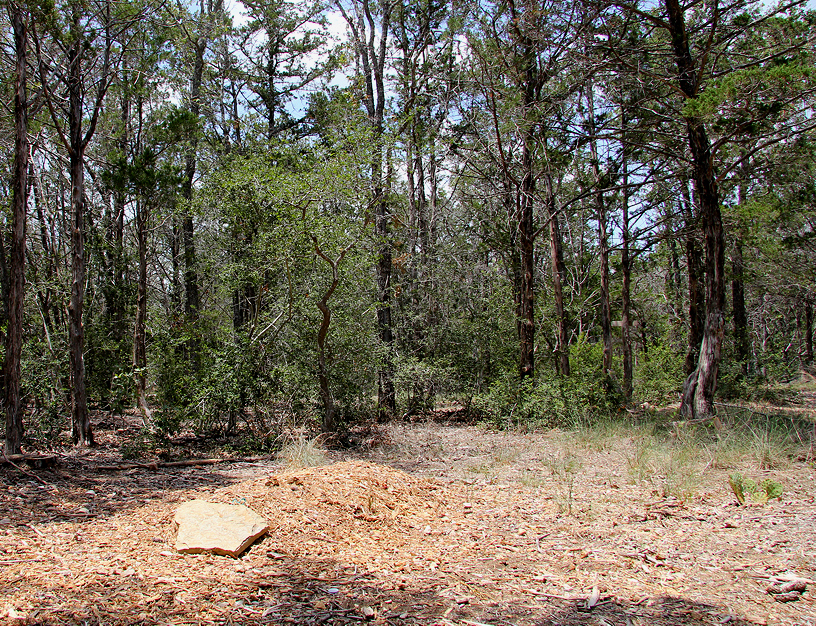
A natural burial gravesite with just a stone to mark the grave

The terms "green burial" and "natural burial", used interchangeably, apply to ceremonies that aim to return the body with the earth with little to no use of artificial, non-biodegradable materials. As a concept, the idea of uniting an individual with the natural world after they die appears to be as old as human death itself, being widespread before the rise of the funeral industry. Holding environmentally-friendly ceremonies as a modern concept first attracted widespread attention in the 1990s. In North America, the opening of the first explicitly "green" burial cemetery in the U.S. took place in the state of South Carolina. However, the Green Burial Council, which came into being in 2005, has based its operations out of California. The institution works to officially certify burial practices for funeral homes and cemeteries, making sure that appropriate materials are used.

Religiously, some adherents of the Roman Catholic Church have a particular interest in "green" funerals, given the faith's preference to full burial of the body as well as the theological commitments to care for the environment stated in Catholic social teaching.

=== Humanist and civil ===
Humanists UK organises a network of humanist funeral celebrants or officiants across England and Wales, Northern Ireland, and the Channel Islands and a similar network is organised by the Humanist Society Scotland. Humanist officiants are trained and experienced in devising and conducting suitable ceremonies for non-religious individuals. Humanist funerals do not recognise an "afterlife", but celebrate the life of the person who has died. In the twenty-first century, humanist funerals have been held for well-known people including Claire Rayner, Keith Floyd, Linda Smith, and Ronnie Barker.

Outside of the United Kingdom, Ireland has featured an increasing number of non-religious funeral arrangements, according to publications such as Dublin Live. This has occurred in parallel with a trend of increasing numbers of people carefully scripting their own funerals before they die, writing the details of their own ceremonies. The Irish Association of Funeral Directors has reported that funerals without a religious focus occur mainly in more urbanized areas in contrast to rural territories. Humanist funerals have also started to become more prominent in other nations such as the Republic of Malta, in which civil rights activist and humanist Ramon Casha had a large scale event at the Radisson Blu Golden Sands resort, devoted to laying him to rest. Although such non-religious ceremonies are "a rare scene in Maltese society" due to the large role of the Roman Catholic Church within that country's culture, according to Lovin Malta, "more and more Maltese people want to know about alternative forms of burial... without any religion being involved".

Actual events during non-religious funerals vary, but they frequently reflect the interests and personality of the deceased. For example, the humanist ceremony for the aforementioned Keith Floyd, a restaurateur and television personality, included a reading of Rudyard Kipling's poetic work "If—" and a performance by musician Bill Padley. Organizations such as the Irish Institute of Celebrants have stated that more and more regular individuals request training for administering funeral ceremonies, instead of leaving things to other individuals.

More recently, some commercial organisations offer civil funerals that can integrate traditionally religious content.

=== Police/fire services ===
Traditional "crossed-ladders" for a fire department funeral

Funerals specifically for fallen members of fire or police services are common in United States and Canada. These funerals involve honour guards from police forces and/or fire services from across the country, and sometimes from overseas. A parade of officers often precedes or follows the hearse carrying the fallen comrade. A traditional fire department funeral consists of two raised aerial ladders. The firefighters travel under the aerials on their ride on the fire apparatus to the cemetery. Once there, the grave service includes the playing of bagpipes. The pipes have come to be a distinguishing feature of a fallen hero's funeral. A "Last Alarm Bell" is also rung, and a portable fire department bell is tolled at the conclusion of the ceremony.

=== Masonic ===
A Masonic funeral is held at the request of a departed Mason or family member. The service may be held in any of the usual places or a Lodge room with committal at graveside, or the complete service can be performed at any of the aforementioned places without a separate committal. Freemasonry does not require a Masonic funeral.

There is no single convention for a Masonic funeral service. Some Grand Lodges have a prescribed service, as it is a worldwide organisation. Some of the customs include the presiding officer wearing a hat while doing his part in the service, the Lodge members placing sprigs of evergreen on the casket, and a small white leather apron may being placed in or on the casket. The hat may be worn because it is Masonic custom (in some places in the world) for the presiding officer to have his head covered while officiating. To Masons, the sprig of evergreen is a symbol of immortality. A Mason wears a white leather apron, called a "lambskin", on becoming a Mason, and may continue to wear it even in death.

== Asian funerals ==
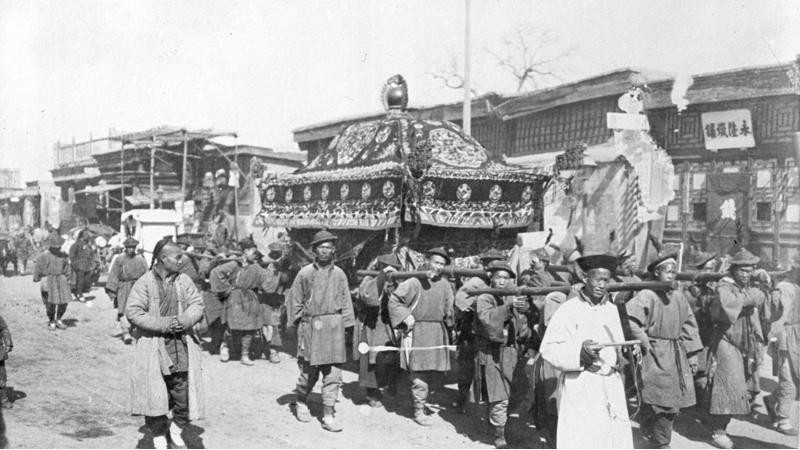
Funeral procession in Beijing, 1900

=== In Japan ===
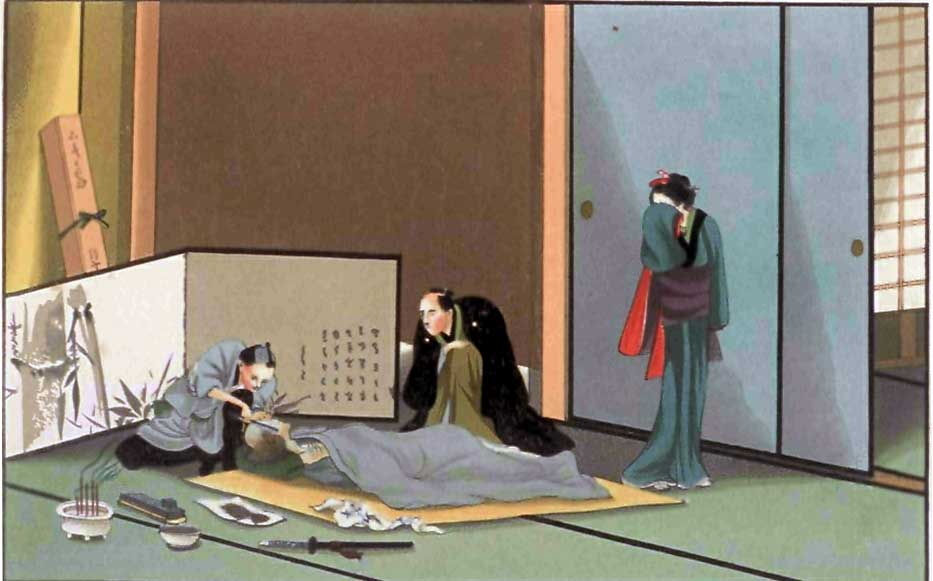
Sudangee or last offices being performed on a dead person, illustration from 1867

Most Japanese funerals are conducted with Buddhist and/or Shinto rites.

According to an estimate in 2005, 99% of all deceased Japanese are cremated.

=== In the Philippines ===
Most, if not all, present-day Filipinos, like their ancestors, believe in some form of an afterlife and give considerable attention to honouring the dead. Except amongst Filipino Muslims, who are obliged to bury a corpse less than 24 hours after death, a wake is generally held from three days to a week after death. Wakes in rural areas are usually held in the home while, in urban settings, the dead is typically displayed in a funeral home. Friends and neighbors bring food to the family, such as pancit noodles and bibingka cake; leftovers are never taken home by guests, because of a superstition against it. Apart from spreading the news about someone's death verbally, obituaries are also published in newspapers. Although the majority of the Filipino people are Christians, they have retained some traditional indigenous beliefs concerning death.

=== In Korea ===
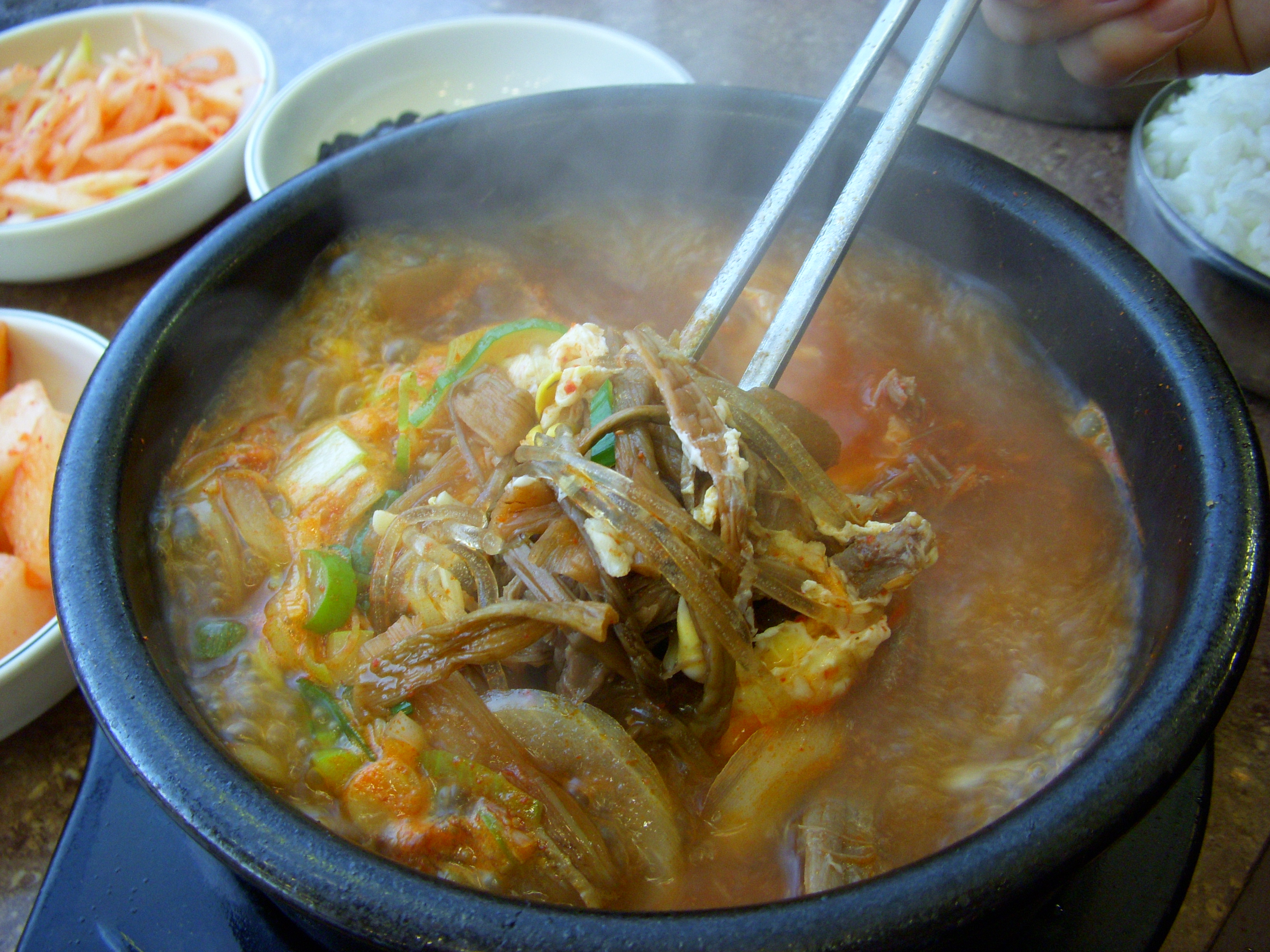
Yukgaejang is a Korean soup traditionally served during funerals.

In Korea, funerals are typically held over three days and different things are done on each day.

On the day a person dies, the body is moved to a funeral hall. They prepare clothes for the body and put them into a chapel of rest. Then, food is prepared for the deceased. It is made up of three bowls of rice and three kinds of Korean side dishes. Also, there has to be three coins and three straw shoes. This can be changed if the family of the dead person has a particular religion.

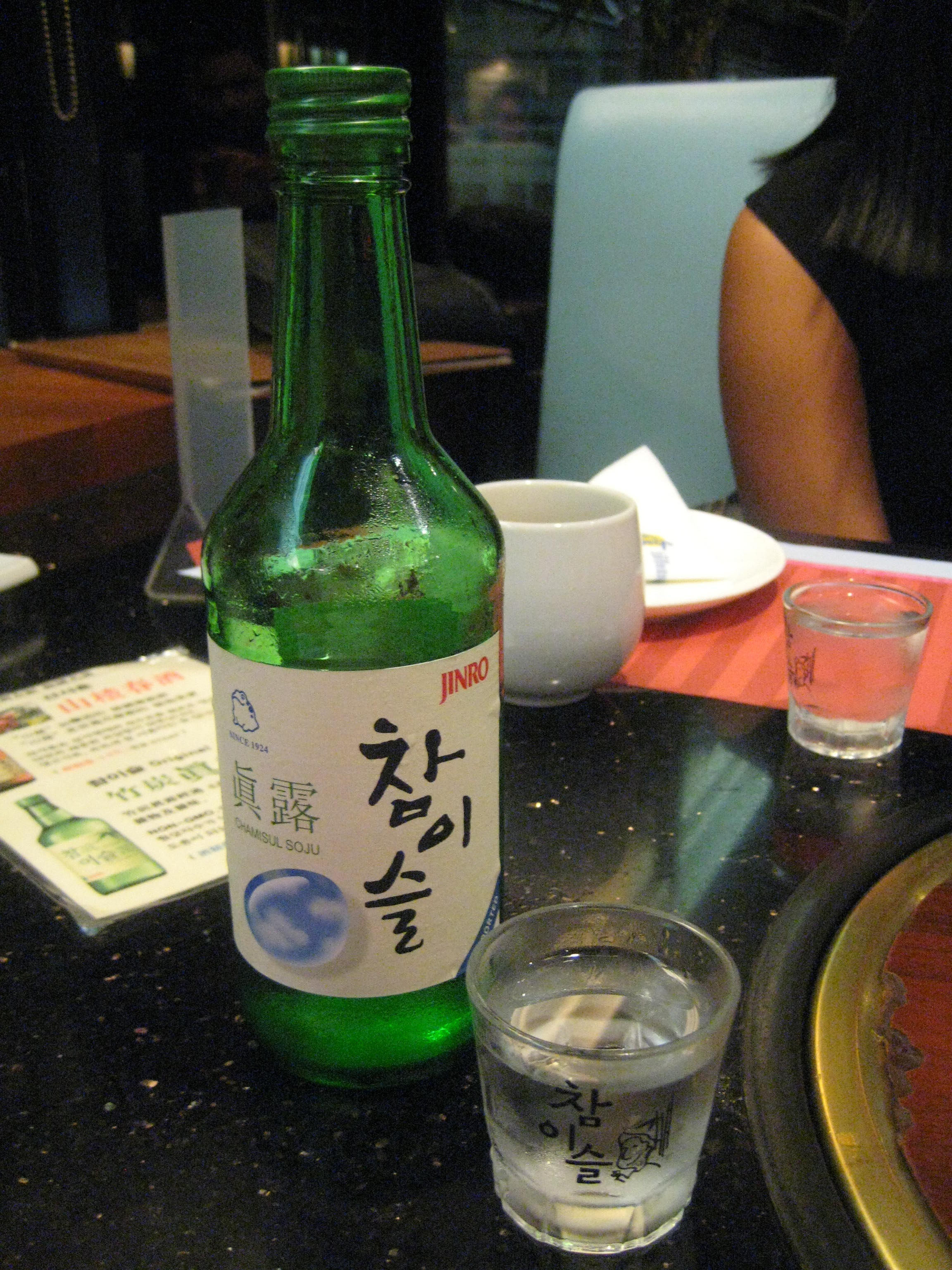
Soju, a Korean distilled drink served at funerals

On the second day, the funeral director washes the body and shrouding is done. Then, a family member of the dead person puts uncooked rice in the mouth of the body. This step does not have to be done if the family has a certain religion. After putting the rice in the mouth, the body is moved into a coffin. Family members, including close relatives, of the dead person will wear mourning clothing. Typically, mourning for a woman includes Korean traditional clothes, Hanbok, and mourning for man includes a suit. The color has to be black. The ritual ceremony begins when they are done with changing clothes and preparing foods for the dead person. The ritual ceremony is different depending on their religion. After the ritual ceremony, family members will start to greet guests.

On the third day, the family decides whether to bury the body in the ground or cremate the body. In the case of burial, three family members sprinkle dirt on the coffin three times. In the case of cremation, there is no specific ritual; the only requirement is a jar to store burned bones and a place to keep the jar.

In Korea, people who come to the funeral will bring condolence money. Also, a food called Yukgaejang is served to guests, oftentimes with the Korean distilled drink, soju.

=== In Mongolia ===
In Mongolia, funeral practices possess significant elements of both indigenous Mongolian rituals and Buddhist traditions.

For Mongolians who are very strict about tradition, families choose from three different ways of burial: open-air burial which is most common, cremation, and embalming. Many factors go into deciding the funeral practice, including the family's social standing, the cause of death, and the place of death. Embalming was mainly chosen by members of the Lamaistic Church; bodies are thus usually buried in a sitting position, so that they would always be in the position of prayer. More important people, such as nobles, would be buried with weapons, horses and food in their coffins to help them prepare for the next world.

The coffin is designed and built by three to four relatives, mainly men. The builders bring planks to the hut where the dead is located and put together the box and the lid. The same people who build the coffin also decorate the funeral. With specific instruction, they work on decorations inside the youngest daughter's house. Most of this work is done after dusk, so the deceased is not disturbed at night.

=== In Vietnam ===
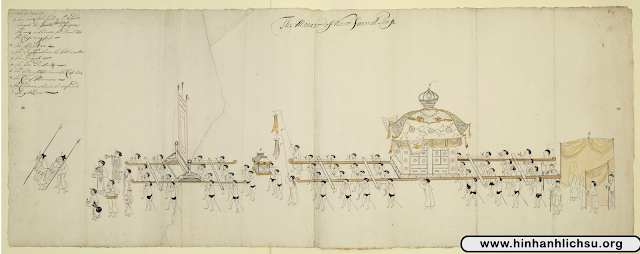
The scene of the funeral procession during the Revival Lê dynasty in 1684-1685

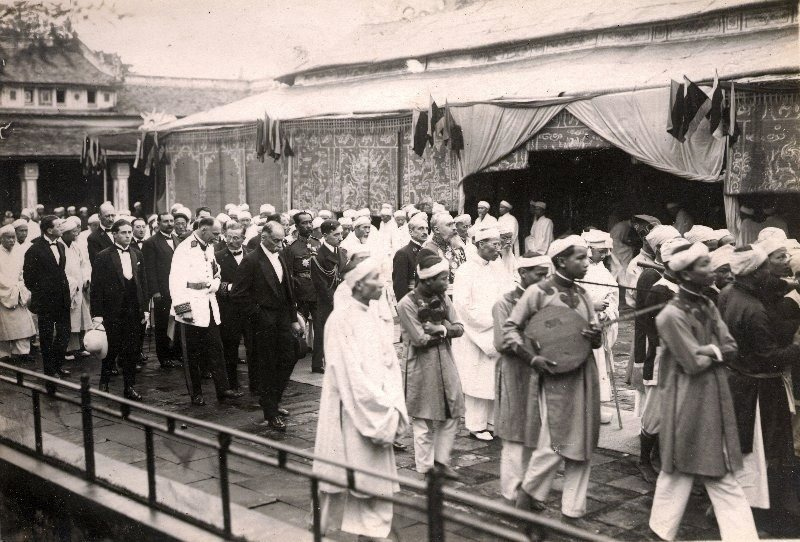
Emperor Khải Định's funeral

In Vietnam, Buddhism is the most commonly practiced religion. However, most burial methods do not coincide with the Buddhist belief of cremation.

The body of the deceased is moved to a loved one's house and placed in an expensive coffin. The body usually stays there for about three days, allowing time for people to visit and place gifts in the mouth. This stems from the Vietnamese belief that the dead should be surrounded by their family. This belief goes so far as to include superstition as well: if somebody is dying in Vietnamese culture, they are rushed home from the hospital so they can die there because, if they die away from home, it is believed to be bad luck to take a corpse home.

Many services are held in the Vietnamese burial practices. One is held before moving the coffin from the home and the other is held at the burial site. After the burial of the loved one, incense is burned at the gravesite and respect is paid to all the nearby graves. Following this, the family and friends return to the home and enjoy a feast to celebrate the life of the recently departed. Even after the deceased has been buried, the respect and honor continues. For the first 49 days after the burial, the family holds a memorial service every 7 days, where the family and friends come back together to celebrate the life of their loved one. After this, they meet again on the 100th day after the death, then 265 days after the death, and finally they meet on the anniversary of the death of their loved one, a year later, to continue to celebrate the glorious life of their recently departed.

The Vietnamese funeral, or đám giỗ, is a less somber occasion than most traditional Western funerals. The đám giỗ is a celebration of the deceased's life and is centered around the deceased's family. The use of mourning headbands emphasizes the importance of personal and familial roles in Vietnamese society. It also allows funeral attendants to carefully choose their interactions and offer condolences to those closest to the deceased.

Traditionally, attendants of a Vietnamese funeral service are encouraged to wear the color white. In many East Asian cultures, white is viewed as a sign of loss and mourning. In Vietnam, members of the Caodaist faith believe that white represents purity and the ability to communicate beyond spiritual worlds.

== African funerals ==
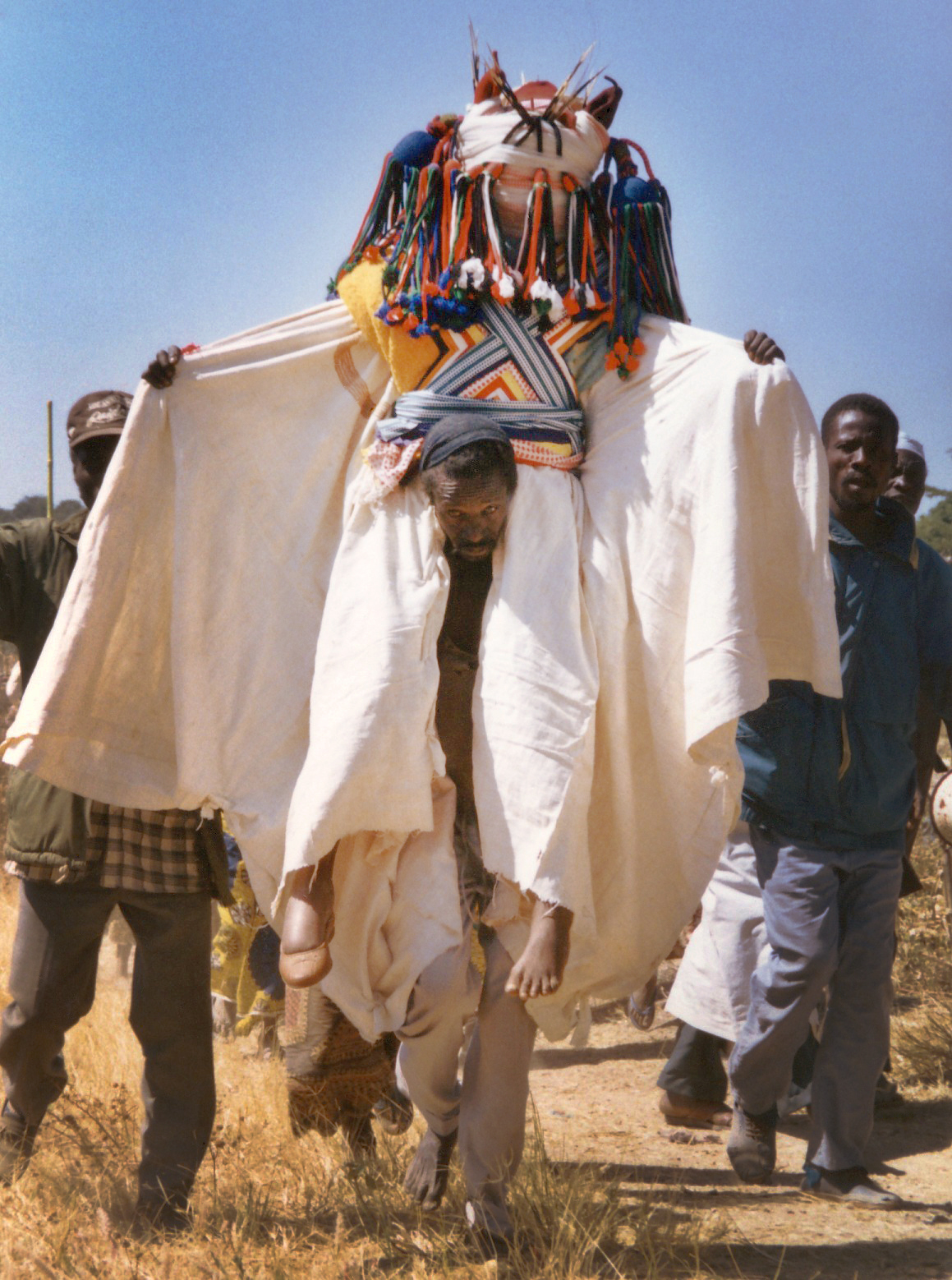
Funerary dance ritual. A blacksmith carries the dressed body. Kapsiki people, North Cameroon.

=== Northern African ===
==== Ancient ====
Ancient Egyptian practice:

=== Western African ===
==== Ancient ====
An aspect of Akan funeral practice that has been written about since the 17th century includes the large outcry of mourning performed by women, and the firing of muskets by men within the streets of towns after a person’s death. This display of grief was done after a household’s elderly women ritually washed the corpse and notified the town of the death. An explanation of this mourning practice is that the dead were believed to still perceive their surroundings during the first eight days after their death, and so the mourning was done to let the deceased know they were being taken care of. It was also believed that the noise created by the grief displays allowed ancestors to take in the deceased by creating a noise barrier. The intense mourning and grief continued with the women of the town entering the home of the dead. Kra Aduane was cooked for the deceased as preparation for their departure and placed on their left side. The spouse of the dead person was separated from them and the townspeople, as a way to be protected from the deceased’s now dangerous spirit. If the spouse was a widow, her head would be shaven and she would put on strongly scented garments. Brandy was drunk by the mourners and the public grieving was both celebratory and sorrowful. Once the mourning transitioned to the wake, the shouting and wailing done by the female mourners turned into the singing of unplanned dirges that honored the deceased, along with dancing. The intensity to which the mourning ritual was performed was based on the deceased's age, their social status, and situation surrounding the death.

The Ashanti and Akan ethnic groups in Ghana typically wear red and black during funerals. For special family members, there is typically a funeral celebration with singing and dancing to honor the life of the deceased. Afterwards, the Akan hold a sombre funeral procession and burial with intense displays of sorrow. Other funerals in Ghana are held with the deceased put in elaborate Fantasy coffins colored and shaped after a certain object, such as a fish, crab, boat, and even airplanes.

=== Central African ===
==== Ancient ====
Bongotols or mboongitwools are items that were used by the Kuba peoples during funerals, starting during the 18th century until the practice started to decline in the 20th century. They are ceramic items that can be both 2-d or 3-d, with the 2-d ones being rectangular with abstract patterns and the 3-d ones being sculptural with surface patterns. The types of bongotols can be further differentiated by the presentation of the material after the final step of their production. There are brittle and red types that are used to make red tukula powder that is covered on the body during funerals. The other types are dark in color and hard and are often valuable heirlooms. In the funerals of nobility, these kinds were presented with the corpse. Both types of bongotols were given as gifts during funerals as well as marriages, although the brittle kind tended to be buried with the deceased person while the hard kind stayed with the deceased’s family.

=== Eastern African ===
==== Ancient ====
Evidence of Africa's earliest funeral was found in Kenya in 2021. A 78,000 year old Middle Stone Age grave of a three-year-old child was discovered in Panga ya Saidi cave complex, Kenya. Researchers said the child's head appeared to have been laid on a pillow. The body had been laid in a fetal position.

=== Southern African ===
==== Ancient ====
The Island of Madagascar has a variety of funerary and burial practices throughout it, depending on the ethnic group. An aspect of mortuary practice present in several regions of Madagascar, starting at least 500 years ago, includes the building and erecting of monoliths and stone tombs. Although this is a continuing practice, the history of these megaliths is not well known. The earliest versions come from Imerina in the central region of Madagascar. These funerary monuments were thin slabbed tombs that were on top of large boulders. These smaller slabs are dated to the 15th-16th century C.E., while larger slabs that can be considered megalithic date back to the 17th-18th century onwards. A particular stone monument type called vatolahy, meaning man stones, are dated back to around this time, though mostly through oral history. These vatolahy, or standing stones, are erected for a variety of reasons, but are mostly associated with the dead. In a mortuary setting, these stones act as both a representation of ancestors and the dead as well as physical embodiment of and substitution for them. In 16-17th century Imerina, a specific type of standing stone called orimbato were erected to signify new treaties and events.

== Historical mausoleums ==
=== China ===
==== Mausoleum of the First Qin Emperor ====
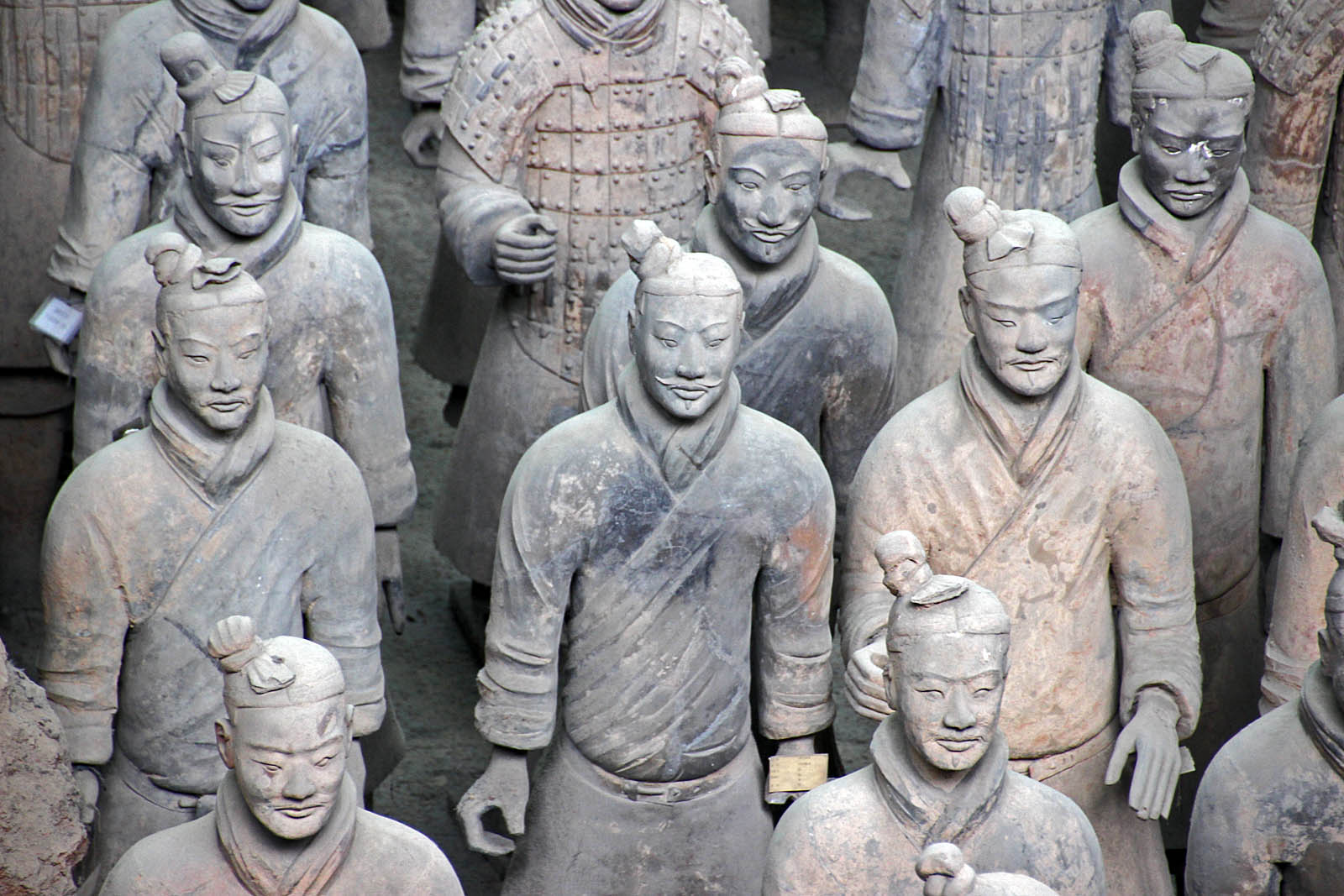
Terracotta warriors of Qin Shi Huang's mausoleum

The first emperor of the Qin dynasty, Qin Shi Huang's mausoleum is located in the Lintong District of Xi'an, Shaanxi Province. Qin Shi Huang's tomb is one of the World Heritage sites in China. Its remarkable feature and size have made it one of the most important historical sites in China.

Ancient Chinese thought that the soul remains even after death, (immortal soul), making funeral practices as an important tradition.

Archeologists have found more than 8,000 life-sized figures resembling an army surrounding the emperor's tomb.

==== Imperial Tombs of the Ming and Qing Dynasties ====
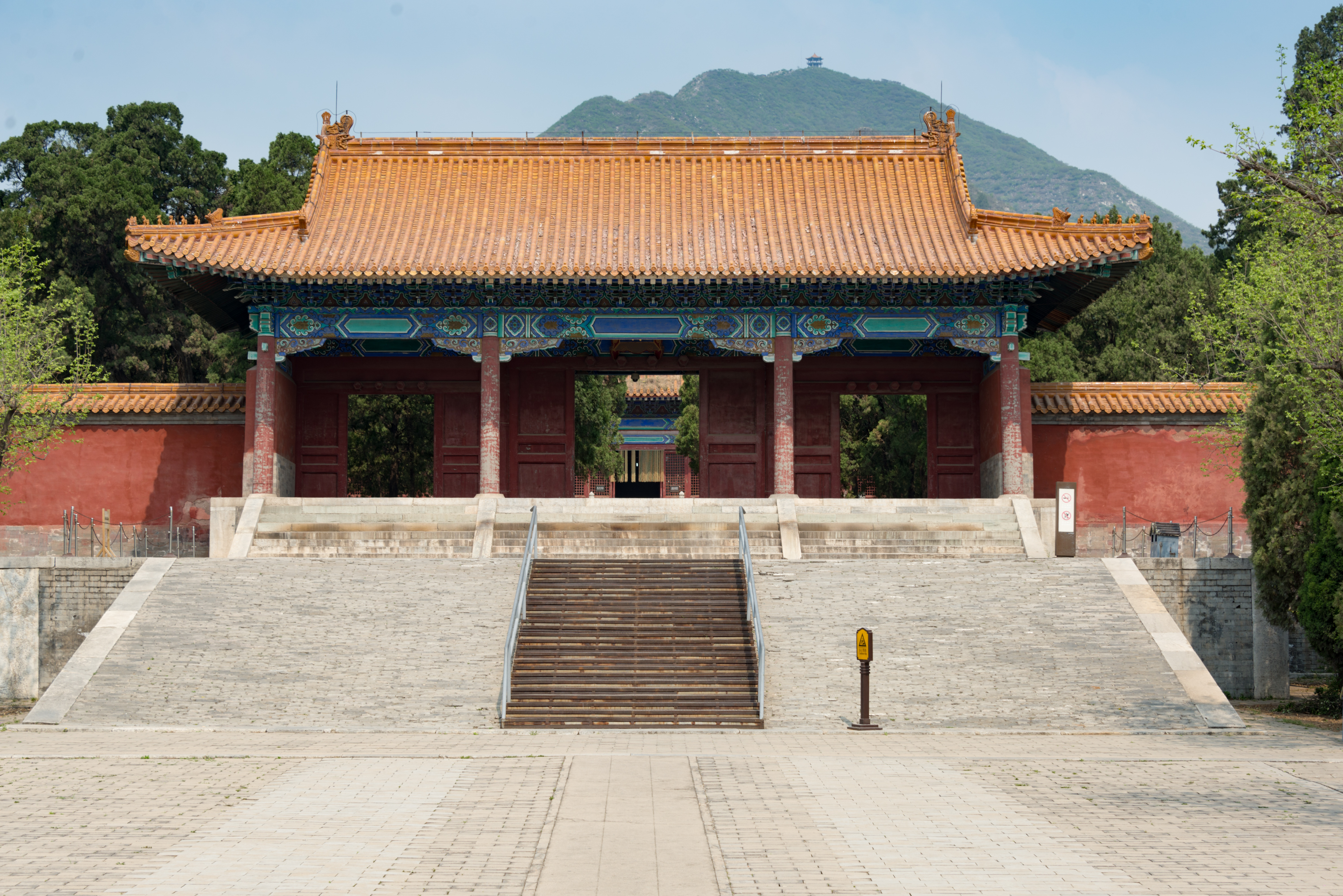
Ming tomb in Beijing, China

The Imperial Tombs of the Ming and Qing Dynasties are included as World Heritage Sites. The three Imperial Tombs of the Qin dynasty were added in 2000 and 2003. The three tombs were all built in the 17th century. The tombs have been constructed to memorialize the emperors of the Qing dynasty and their ancestors. In tradition, Chinese have followed Feng Shui to build and decorate the interior. All of the tombs are strictly made following the superstition of Feng Shui.

The Imperial Tombs of the Ming and Qing Dynasties clearly show the cultural and architectural tradition that has existed in the area for more than 500 years[citation?]. In Chinese culture, the tombs were considered as a portal between the world of the living and the dead[citation?]. Chinese believed that the portal would divide the soul into two parts. One half of the soul would go to heaven, and the other half would remain within the physical body.

== Mutes and professional mourners ==
From about 1600 to 1914, Europe had two professions that have almost entirely disappeared. The mute appears in art quite frequently, but in literature is probably best known from Dickens's Oliver Twist (1837–1839). Oliver is working for Mr Sowerberry when characterised thus: "There's an expression of melancholy in his face, my dear... which is very interesting. He would make a delightful mute, my love." In Martin Chuzzlewit (1842–1844), Moult, the undertaker, states: "This promises to be one of the most impressive funerals,...no limitation of expense...I have orders to put on my whole establishment of mutes, and mutes come very dear, Mr Pecksniff".

The main function of a funeral mute was to stand around at funerals with a sad, pathetic face. A symbolic protector of the deceased, the mute would usually stand near the door of the home or church. In Victorian times, mutes would wear somber clothing including black cloaks, top hats with trailing hatbands, and gloves.

The professional mourner, generally a woman, would shriek and wail, often while clawing her face and tearing at her clothing, to encourage others to weep. Records document forms of professional mourning from Ancient Greece. The 2003 Philippine comedy Crying Ladies revolves around the lives of three women who are part-time professional mourners for the Chinese-Filipino community in Manila's Chinatown.

== State funeral ==
High-ranking national figures, such as heads of state, prominent politicians, military figures, national heroes and eminent cultural figures, may be offered state funerals.

== Final disposition ==
Common methods of disposal are:

- Burial of the entire body in a cemetery, often within a coffin or casket (also referred to as inhumation or interment)
- Permanent storage in an above-ground crypt as part of a tomb or mausoleum (also referred to as immurement)
- Cremation, which burns soft tissue and renders much of the skeleton to ash. The remains may contain larger pieces of bone which are ground in a machine to the consistency of ash. The ashes are commonly stored in an urn, or scattered on land or water, especially in a cemetery's scattering garden or as part of its memorial benches.
- Urns can be interred, buried, entombed, immured, or placed inside a columbarium at a cemetery. An urn can additionally be buried in a traditional cemetery plot, similar to a casket.
- Water cremation is a solutional process of using water and potassium hydroxide (also known as alkaline hydrolysis) to swiftly break down a body into bone fragments as well as sterile liquid.

== Organ donation and body donation ==
Some people donate their bodies to a medical school for use in research or education. Medical students frequently study anatomy from donated cadavers; they are also useful in forensic research. Some medical conditions, such as amputations or various surgeries, can make the cadaver unsuitable for these purposes; in other cases, the bodies of people who had certain medical conditions are useful for research into those conditions. Many medical schools rely on the donation of cadavers for the teaching of anatomy.

== See also ==
- Burial
- Dead bell
- Eulogy
- Funerary art
- Homo naledi
- Institute of Civil Funerals
- List of funerals
- Wake (ceremony)
- Repast (funeral)
