= Repast (magazine) =

Culinary history magazine

- Editor: Randy K. Schwartz
- Former editors: Pat Cornett, Susan Fussell, Ann Woodward
- Categories: Food history
- Frequency: Quarterly (1999- ); 1-4/year (1987-1998)
- Format: Letter-size pamphlet
- First issue: June 1987; 39 years ago
- Company: Culinary Historians of Ann Arbor
- Country: United States
- Based in: Ann Arbor, Michigan
- Language: English
- Website: culinaryhistoriansannarbor.org/repast/
- ISSN: 1552-8863
- OCLC: 56585471

Repast is the official quarterly publication of the Culinary Historians of Ann Arbor (CHAA), founded in June, 1987. The CHAA had been founded in 1983 by Jan Longone.

Repast publishes articles and book reviews on food history as well as covering CHAA activities.
