= Repast (funeral) =

Communal meal held after a funeral

A repast is an African-American cultural rite comprising a meal held after a funeral or memorial service, during which family, friends and mourners come together to share food, offer condolences and provide mutual support.

== History ==
=== West African and antebellum roots ===
The roots of the modern repast tie back to West African mourning practices that blended with rituals formed during American chattel slavery. In the early eras of enslavement, collective mourning was strictly restricted by enslavers to prevent rebellion. Over time, as those bans relaxed, funerals became one of the rare legal social allowances where Black families could gather, socialize, and freely express grief.

Because loved ones would travel long distances from neighboring areas to attend these services, the community needed to provide sustenance. Food like stews, fried fish, and corn pone were served in abundance. This gathering transitioned from the somber burial to a celebration of life, often referred to as a "homegoing"—rejoicing that the deceased was leaving earthly suffering behind to enter heaven.

Following emancipation and through the Jim Crow era, African-American communities faced systemic barriers to formal social and economic support systems. The church family and local neighbors stepped in as the safety net. Providing a large, hand-delivered buffet-style meal for a mourning family was an essential act of mutual aid, lifting the practical and financial burdens of hospitality from the grieving household.

=== Modern practices ===
The repast serves as a communal event that allows attendees to reflect on the deceased's life, share memories, and find comfort in a less formal setting than the funeral service itself. It often marks a transition from the solemnity of the burial or memorial to a space for emotional connection and healing.

== See also ==
- Funeral
- Wake (ceremony)
- Soul food
- Mourning
