= Golak (Sikhism) =

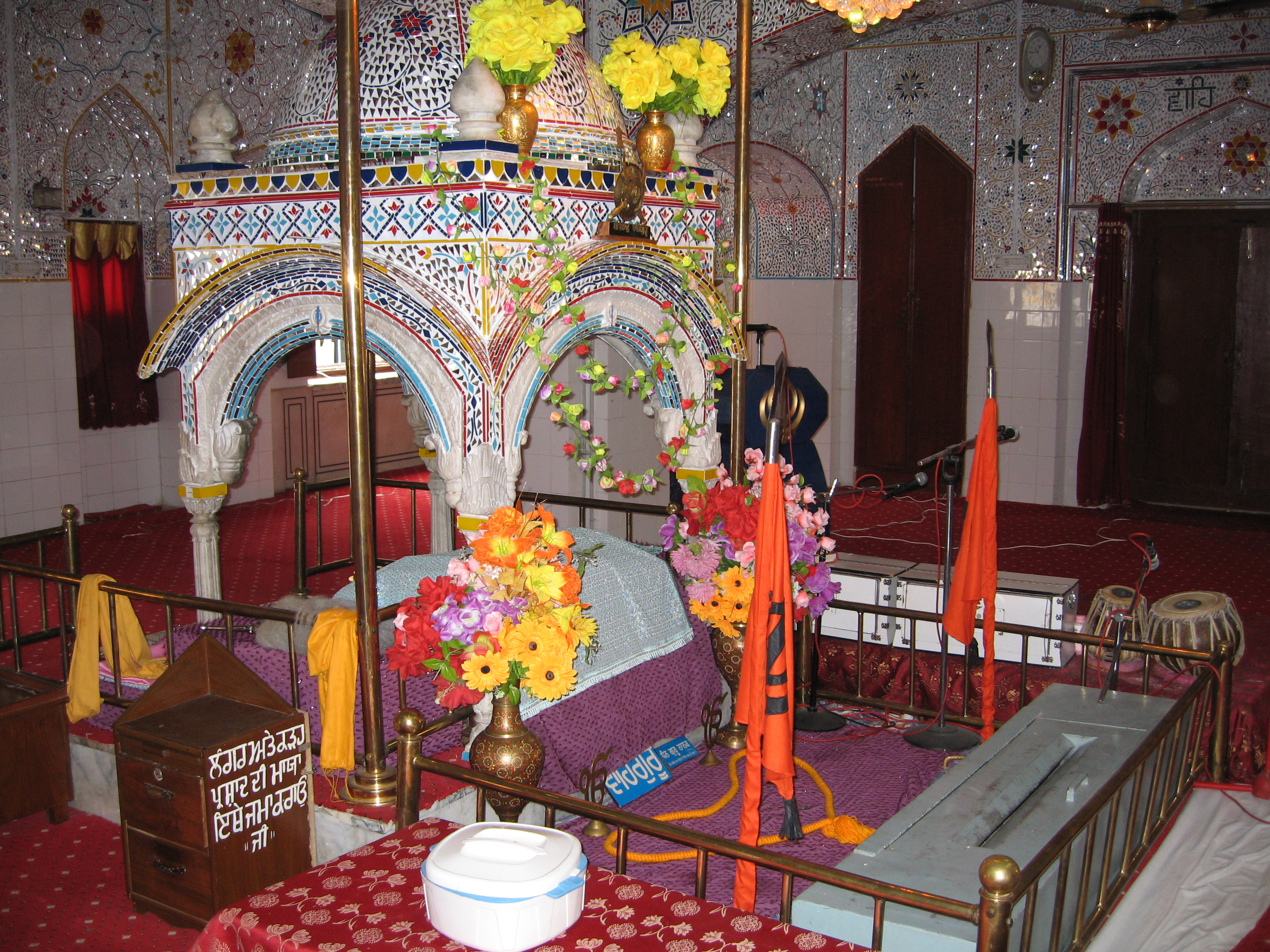
Golak donation-box at Gurdwara Panjab Sahib, installed in front of the Guru Granth Sahib.

A Golak (meaning "till", "receptacle", or "cash-box") is a donation-box installed at Sikh temples for the purposes of keeping gifts, offerings, and financial contributions. The golak is usually kept at the front of the sanctum sanctorum in the Darbar Sahib Hall as a receptacle for visitors to put money inside. Whatever is inputted into the golak should be used for charitable means and offerings are made in the name of the guru. They are found in gurdwaras and historically, dharamsāls. The donations from the golak fund langar, schools, and hospitals.

== Etymology ==
The word Punjabi word golak is related from the Sanskrit word golak and Persian gholak.

== Purpose ==
Sikhism stresses upon dān (charity). Sikhs are religiously mandated to part with a tenth of their income for donations, known as dasvandh. The rehitnamas mandate Sikh households to maintain their own personal golak to collect their tithe together. The dasvandhs collected and routine offerings come together as the Gurū kī Golak, a public fund used for expenses relating to the community and for charity. This common-fund does not need to be kept together at a single location. The running of free-kitchens (langar) requires financial and material resources. Other expenses relating to construction works, orphanage maintenance, asylums, dispensaries, schools occur. Thus, golaks are important for the functioning of Sikh practices and institutions. There exists a Sikh expression relating to the practice: Gharīb kī rasnā, Gurū kī golak (meaning "feeding a poor man is tantamount to contributing to the Gurū's golak").

Golaks at gurdwaras receiving daily donations and offerings are sealed, some of which is used to fund the cost of the temple's langar-khana. When the golak contributions are counted, it is done so in the presence of chosen people. Sikhism does not mandate strict-rules regarding the collection of donations and gifts.

== History ==
In India, it has long been a custom where devotees would make an offering to a deity. Early Sikh worship places, known as dharamsāls, all had a golak to collect donations. When the Manji dioceses and Masand management system came about, the masands were responsible for collecting the tithes from areas of their jurisdiction and submit them to the Sikh guru, where they became part of the common-fund. The main responsibility of the masands was collecting dasvandh donations and submitting them to the guru on a regular-basis, procuring receipts of donations against them. Guru Arjan invented the practice of pooling financial and material donations and gifts together as a common-fund as the Sikh community was experiencing growth and needed resources. These increased finances allowed for the construction of more sarovars (temple-tanks), shrines, and settlements. The guru's golak was the treasury. According to Chaupa Singh's rehitnama, a Sikh should view a destitute person's mouth as a Golak for charity. Therefore, the downtrodden and lowly are central recipients for aid and donations by Sikhs, rather than a Brahminical-class.

Eventually, the masands became corrupted over time and therefore Guru Gobind Singh abolished them and established direct contact with the scattered sangats, not relying on any intermediary. The Sikh households would maintain a private golak, and after the masands were abolished, the sangats would submit all of their dasvandh from their golak to Guru Gobind Singh when visiting him on special occasions, such as festivals. When the Guru Granth Sahib was given the guruship, the guru was simultaneously available at multiple places, installed in gurdwaras. As a result, the tithe and offerings could be submitted at any gurdwara or associated charitable institutions, making household golaks obsolete. After the Gurdwara Reform movement, golaks at most historical gurdwaras are operated by the SGPC whilst other gurdwaras are managed by local committees or sangats.

== Robbery ==
There have been instances of gurdwaras being robbed, including their associated golaks. The robberies have occurred in the Indian state of Punjab but also at overseas gurdwaras in the diaspora. The term golak chor ("thief of the money box") is used as an insult to describe Sikh groups who misappropriate the sangat's (congregation) donations from the golak box. Manjit Singh of the Delhi Sikh Gurdwara Prabandhak Committee had stepped-down after being accused of being a golak chor.
