= Dasvandh =

Sikh religious tithing practice

Dasvandh (Punjabi: ਦਸਵੰਧ, lit. 'tenth part', also translated as 'tithe', alternatively spelt as daswandh) is the one tenth part (or 10%) of one's income that one should donate, both financially (as a tithe) and directly in the form of seva, according to Sikh principles.

== Overview ==
It falls into Guru Nanak Dev's concepts of Vand Chhako and Kirat karo. The practice was followed during the period of Guru Arjan Dev and many Sikhs still continue to carry out the practice in the present-day. The concept of dasvandh was implicit in Guru Nanak's own line: "ghali khai kichhu hathhu dei, Nanak rahu pachhanahi sei—He alone, O Nanak, knoweth the way who eats out of what he earneth by his honest labour and yet shareth part of it with others" (GG, 1245). The idea of sharing and giving was nourished by the institutions of sangat (holy congregation) and langar (community kitchen) the Guru had established. Sikhs believe that whatever one gives in charity, they shall receive back many fold to their benefit in-return in both a material and spiritual sense, as the two realms are inseparable as per Sikh theology.

== History ==
The practice of charitable giving was preached and spread by Guru Amar Das, followed by Guru Ram Das, and by Guru Arjan. During the guruship of Guru Amar Das, an authorized institution for managing and spreading the Sikh religion was developed in order to show directions to the Sikhs by preaching them the teachings of Sikh gurus. Guru Amar Das set up 22 manjis (districts) in various parts of the subcontinent. Each of these manjis was placed under the charge of a devout Sikh (of either gender) who, besides conducting missionary work, looked after the sangats (local Sikh congregation) of their jurisdiction and imparted the followers' offerings to the Guru. The construction work of the Harmandir Sahib shrine at Amritsar, whose work began under the watch of Guru Ram Das, was an expensive undertaking, therefore the Sikhs were asked to donate at-least ten percent (dasvandh) of their earnings for funding the construction work as a united, communal effort. This, the idea of Guru Ki Golak (meaning "Guru's treasury") was devised. Others trace the roots of the dasvandh institution to the guruship period of Guru Arjan, who instituted financial reforms which would lead to the formation of the dasvandh tradition. The Masands (ministers and the tithe-collectors) had the responsibility of collecting "kar bhet" (seva offerings) and dasvandh donations from the Sikhs in the region they were stationed in, and to then ensure these were in-turn given to the Guru.

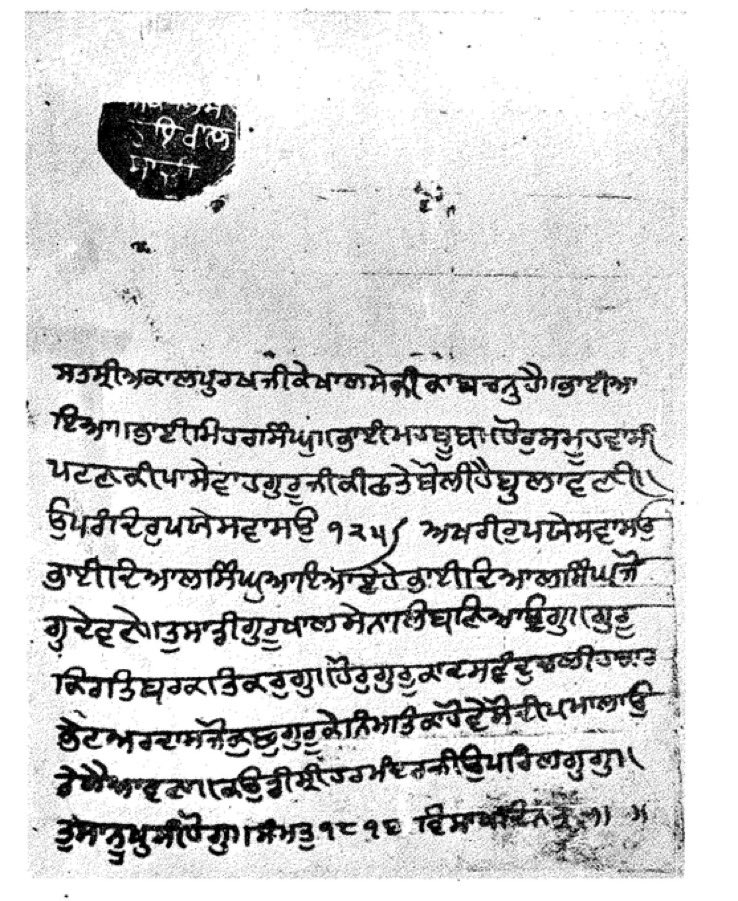
Hukamnama of the Khalsa addressed to Bhai Mehar Singh and Bhai Mahboob of Patna requesting dasvandh donations to go towards rebuilding the recently desecrated and destroyed Golden Temple, dated 12 April 1759

References to the practice of dasvandh can be found in various writings known as rehitnamas (manuals of Sikh codes of conduct) that were scribed during the era of Guru Gobind Singh or shortly after his period. As an example, Bhai Nand Lal’s Tankhahnama quotes Gobind Singh as saying the following regarding the practice: "Hear ye Nand Lal, one who does not give dasvandh and, telling lies, misappropriates it, is not at all to be trusted". The practice has survived due to the efforts of fervent Sikhs in maintaining it. The practice itself serves both individualistic and communalistic aims, being an outlet for personal religious devotion and as a united communal effort exemplifying the concept of the Guru Panth ("Guru's path").

One who works for what he eats, and gives some of what he has - O Nanak, he knows the Path. (1)

— Sri Guru Granth Sahib page 1245 Full Shabad

== See also ==
- Zakat
