= Islam and Sikhism =

Islam is an Abrahamic religion founded in the Arabian Peninsula, while Sikhism is an Indian religion founded in the Punjab region of the Indian subcontinent. Islam means 'submission to god'. Sikhism, despite its monotheism, is categorised by hardline Muslims scholars as kafir mushrikun due to rejection of Islamic prophecy by Sikhism.

The word Sikh is derived from a word meaning 'disciple', or one who learns. Sikhs believe that the 'creator and creation are one and the same thing'. Most Muslims, on the other hand, believe God is separate and distinct from his creation. Islam believes that Muhammad was the last prophet, to whom the Quran was revealed by God in the 7th century CE. Sikhism was founded in the 15th century CE by Guru Nanak. Guru Granth Sahib is the scripture followed by Sikhs as "The Living Guru."

In Islam, the legal system based on the Quran and the Sunnah is known as Sharia; there is no such legal system mentioned in Guru Granth Sahib. Daily prayers are one of the pillars of Islam, and they are mandatory for all Muslims. Baptized Sikhs read the five banis as part of their daily routine, Nitnem. Islam requires annual zakah (alms giving) by Muslims. Kirat Karna (doing an honest livelihood — earning honestly without any sort of corruption); Naam Japna (to chant and meditate on Naam, read and follow "The One"); and Vand Chhako (selfless service [sewa] and sharing with others) are fundamental to Sikhism given by Guru Nanak Dev Ji. The Hajj is a religious pilgrimage to Mecca that is an important part of Islam, while Sikhs do not believe in pilgrimages. However, many Sikhs do frequently travel to Harmandir Sahib in Amritsar.

There has been a history of constructive influence and conflict between Islam and Sikhism. The Sikh scripture Guru Granth Sahib includes teachings from Muslims, namely Baba Farid and Kabir.

The first convert to Sikhism was a Muslim, Mardana, who was Guru Nanak's lifelong friend and companion on his journeys. He is believed to have played the rebab while Guru Nanak recited the sacred hymns that would later form the Adi Granth.

The first major interaction between the two religions happened when Guru Nanak spent two years in Mecca and the Middle East. He learned about Islam and had detailed discussions with Muslim sheikhs.

== Comparison ==
=== Belief ===
==== God ====
Sikhism believes that God is formless (nirankar). It is a monotheistic religion in that it believes in a single God (Waheguru), and it has also been seen as a form of panentheism. God in the nirgun aspect is without attributes, unmanifest, not seen, but all pervading and permeating, omnipresent. God in the sargun aspect is manifest and has attributes, qualities, and is seen in the whole of creation.

There is only one God, He is the eternal truth, He is without fear, He is without hate, immortal, without form, beyond birth and death

— Guru Nanak, Mul Mantar, Guru Granth Sahib

Islam is also a monotheistic religion as Muslims believe one God (Allah) and particularly in the concept of tawḥīd. This Islamic doctrine is a part of its Shahada.

Say: He is Allah, the One and Only; (1) Allah, the Eternal, Absolute; (2) He begetteth not, nor is He begotten; (3) And there is none like unto Him. (4)

— Al-Ikhlas

The Islamic theosophical belief in wahdatul wujud has many similarities to Sikh panentheism.

==== Guru and Messengers ====
Sikhism reveres Guru Nanak as the first Sikh Guru of the faith who taught of the one divine creator, WaheGuru. The Guru Gaddi, the symbolic seat of the Guru, has been filled by the ten Sikh Gurus, who have guided the Sikh people (Panth), and is now occupied by the Sikh holy text, Guru Granth Sahib. Sikhism accepts that there were other messengers—including Moses, Jesus, and Mohammed—in other religions.

Islam believes that there were many messengers of God, with the last messenger being Prophet Mohammed, who received the Quran as the last revelation of God. This conflicts with Sikhism whose first guru came around 800 years after the Prophet Mohammed.

==== Spirituality ====
Sikhism has an ambivalent attitude towards miracles and rejects any form of discrimination within and against other religions. Sikhism does not believe in rituals, but is permissive of traditions. Sikhism rejects asceticism and celibacy. The Sikhism founder Guru Nanak adopted the Indic ideas on rebirth, and taught the ideas of reincarnation. Adi Granth of Sikhism recognizes and includes spiritual wisdom from other religions.

Islam considers itself to be a perfect and final religion, and warns against innovation (bid‘ah) to what is revealed in the Quran and the Hadiths. Islam believes in miracles and a final judgment day (Yawm al-Qiyāmah).

==== Apostasy and view on other religions ====
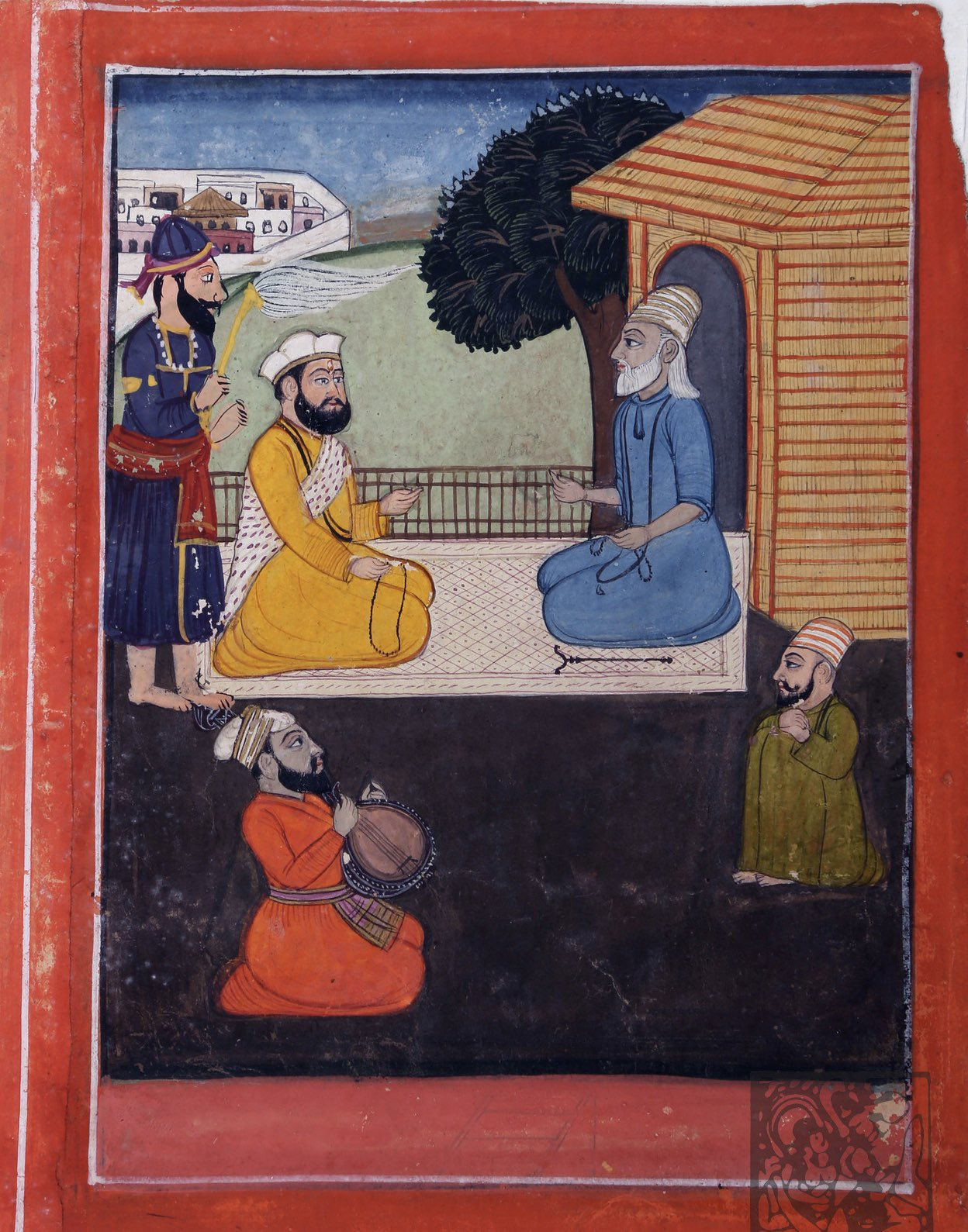
Guru Nanak conversing with Sufi Rahman Shah. Bhai Bala with Chauri and Bhai Mardana with Rabab also depicted, c.1830 Pahari painting

Sikhism allows freedom of conscience and choosing one's own path. It teaches that many religious traditions are valid, leading to the same Waheguru, and it rejects that any particular religion has a monopoly regarding absolute truth for all of humanity.

Islam teaches that non-Islamic religious traditions have been distorted by man to suit their desires. Accordingly, apostasy—that is abandonment of Islam by a Muslim and conversion to another religion or atheism—is a religious crime in Islam punishable with death. According to the Hadiths, states John Esposito (2003), leaving Islam is punishable by "beheading, crucifixion or banishment," and sharia (Islamic legal code) traditionally has required death by the sword for an adult sane male who voluntarily leaves Islam. However, adds Esposito (2003), modern thinkers have argued against execution as penalty for apostasy from Islam by invoking Quranic verse 2:256.

==== Predestination ====
Sikhism believes in predestination within God's will, and what one does, speaks and hears falls within that will; one has to simply follow the laid down path per God's hukam.

Islam, particularly Sunni Islam, believes in predestination, or divine preordainment (al-qadā wa l-qadar), wherein God has full knowledge and control over all that occurs. According to Islamic tradition, all that has been decreed by God is written in al-Lawh al-Mahfūz, the 'Preserved Tablet'.

=== Practices ===
Sikh practices are outlined in the Sikh Rehat Maryada. These include the following:

1. Naam japna - To meditate and pray on WaheGuru's name.
2. Kirat Karni - To live and earn an honest life
3. Vand Chakna - To share one's earning with others and live as a community.

Additionally, Amritdhari Sikhs who belong to the Khalsa Panth wear the 5 articles of faith, known as the Five Ks:

1. Kes — uncut hair and beard
2. Kangha — a wooden comb to keep oneself clean
3. Kara — a metal bracelet worn around the wrist to remember the unity of WaheGuru
4. Kirpan — a small dagger to be worn at the waist for the defense of oneself and the innocent
5. Kacchera — an undergarment for humility

The Khalsa was created on Vaisakhi in 1699 by the tenth Sikh Guru, Guru Gobind Singh. The Khalsa Sikhs have a set of seven Sikh prayers, called Nitnem, which are to be recited daily during Amrit Vela.

The Five Pillars of Islam are duties incumbent on every Muslim:

1. Shahada — testimony that "There is no god but Allah and Muhammad is the messenger of God"
2. Salat — prayers;
3. Zakat — Giving of alms
4. Sawm — Fasting during Ramadan; and
5. Hajj — pilgrimage to Mecca).

These 5 practices are essential to Sunni Islam; Shi'a Muslims subscribe to 8 ritual practices which substantially overlap with the five Pillars.

==== Grooming and dress ====
The Khalsa Panth among Sikhs are guided by the five Ks. They keep their head hair long (kesh) and men wear dastar (turban). They carry a wooden comb, wear an iron bracelet, wear a cotton underwear, and carry a kirpan (steel sword). Non-baptized Sikh women are free to dress as they wish in Sikhism. Sex segregation is not required in public places or Sikh temples by Sikhism.

Muslim males are encouraged to grow their beards and trim the moustache. Men in some Muslim communities wear turban (head cap). Muslim men, as well as women, must dress modestly. Muslim women are required to cover their bodies in public, with some Islamic scholars stating that the Hadiths require covering the face too; it is also highly recommended to cover their hair. Islam encourages gender segregation in public, and Muslim men and women do not usually mix in public places such as mosques. These restrictions are part of Adab.

==== Circumcision ====
Sikhism does not require circumcision of either males or females, and criticizes the practice.

In Islam, no verse in the Quran supports male or female circumcision (FGM/C). Male circumcision is a widespread practice and considered mandatory for Muslim males according to Sunnah. Muslim scholars disagree whether any authentic Sunnah in the hadiths supports the practice of female circumcision. The Ijma, or consensus of Muslim scholars, varies by the Islamic jurisprudence (fiqh) on whether circumcision is optional, honorable or obligatory for Muslim male and females. (Note: According to Islamic scholars Ibrahim Lethome Asmani and Maryam Sheikh Abdi, "Examination of all the texts on Islamic jurisprudence (fiqh) shows that scholars have no consensus on FGM/C. For example the four schools of thought express the following views: The Hanafi view is that it is a sunnah (optional act) for both females and males; Maliki hold the view that it is wajib (obligatory) for males and sunnah (optional) for females; Shafi’i view it as wajib (obligatory) for both females and males; Hanbali have two opinions: it is wajib (obligatory) for both males and females, and it is wajib (obligatory) for males and makrumah (honourable) for females.) Prominent Islamic scholars have both supported and opposed FGM/C for female Muslims. (Note: According to 2016 estimates of UNICEF, at least 200 million girls and women alive today worldwide have undergone female genital mutilation/cutting. The 2013 report by the UNICEF states, "in many countries, FGM/C prevalence is highest among Muslim girls and women. The practice, however, is also found among Catholic and other Christian communities.")

==== Food and fasting ====
Sikhs are prohibited from eating kutha meat—meat obtained by ritualistic component and a slow death of the animal, as in Islamic halal or Jewish kosher meat. The official Sikh Code of Conduct Sikh Rehat Maryada only forbids the consumption of Kutha meat. Charity meals distributed at a Sikh Gurudwara, called a langar, is only lacto-vegetarian. Some groups of Sikhism disagree with the consumption of meat altogether. In practice, some Sikhs eat meat, while others avoid meat. Sikhism encourages temperance and moderation in food, i.e. to neither starve or overeat. Thus, it does not find merit in fasting, which is banned as an austerity, as a ritual, or as a mortification of the body by means of wilful hunger. Sikhs are forbidden from smoking and consumption of tobacco.

Islam has Quranic restrictions on food, such as how the meat is prepared. Halal meat is required in Islam, prepared by ritual slaughter that involves cutting the jugular veins of the animal with a sharp knife. This leads to death, through bleeding, of the animal. Meat from animals that die of natural causes or accident is not allowed, unless necessary. Beef is a religiously acceptable food to Muslims, but pork and alcohol is not.

Fasting is commended in Islam, especially in the month of Ramadan.

==== Taxation ====
Sikhism has never required a special tax for non-Sikhs.

Muslim rulers in history compelled the payment of a special tax (jizya) from dhimmi, non-Muslims living in a Muslim state. The Muslim jurists required adult, free, sane males among the dhimmi community to pay the jizya, while exempting non-Muslim women, children, elders, handicapped, the ill, the insane, monks, hermits, slaves and musta'mins—non-Muslim foreigners who only temporarily reside in Muslim lands. Dhimmis who chose to join military service were also exempted from payment, as were those who could not afford to pay. According to Islamic law, non-Muslim elders, handicapped etc. must be given pensions, and they must not go into begging. The purpose of the jizya was in exchange for protection and defending all non-Muslim residents against outside forces or invasions. Jizya was never imposed with the purpose to humiliate, demean or impose the faith of Islam on the non-Muslims. As Muslims pay zakat (2.5% of their savings, this amount of zakat paid by Muslims, exceeded the amount of jizya paid by the non-Muslims), which goes to the government for people in need. Dhimmis were excluded from having to pay Islamic religious tax such as zakat, also were excluded from other Islamic religious obligations.

==== Worship and pilgrimage ====
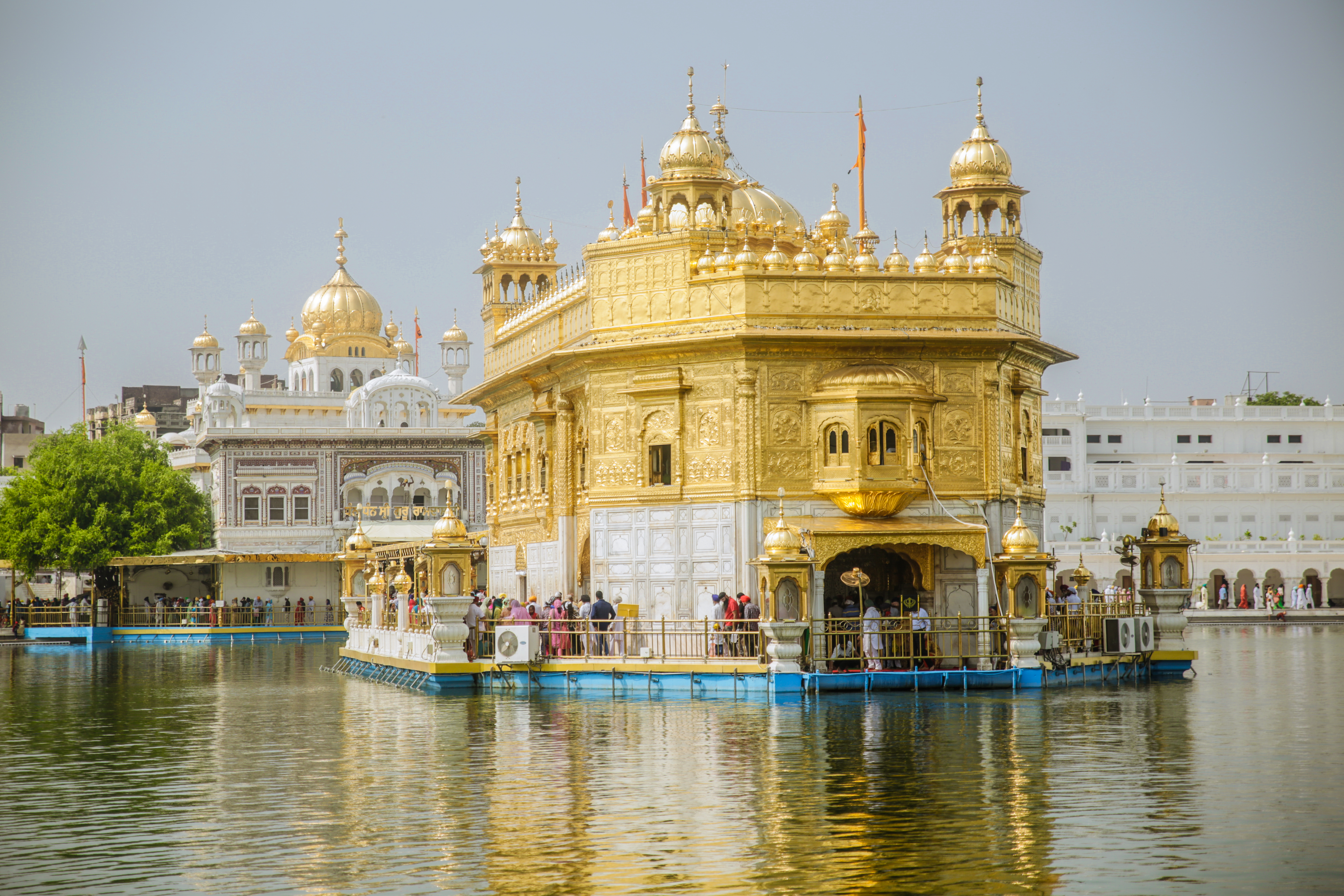
The Harmandir Sahib (also known as the Golden Temple).

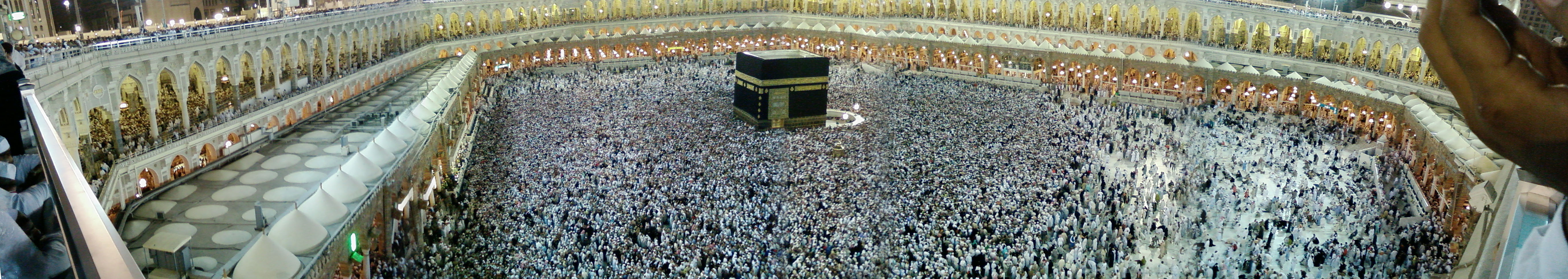
Masjid al-Haram Mecca.

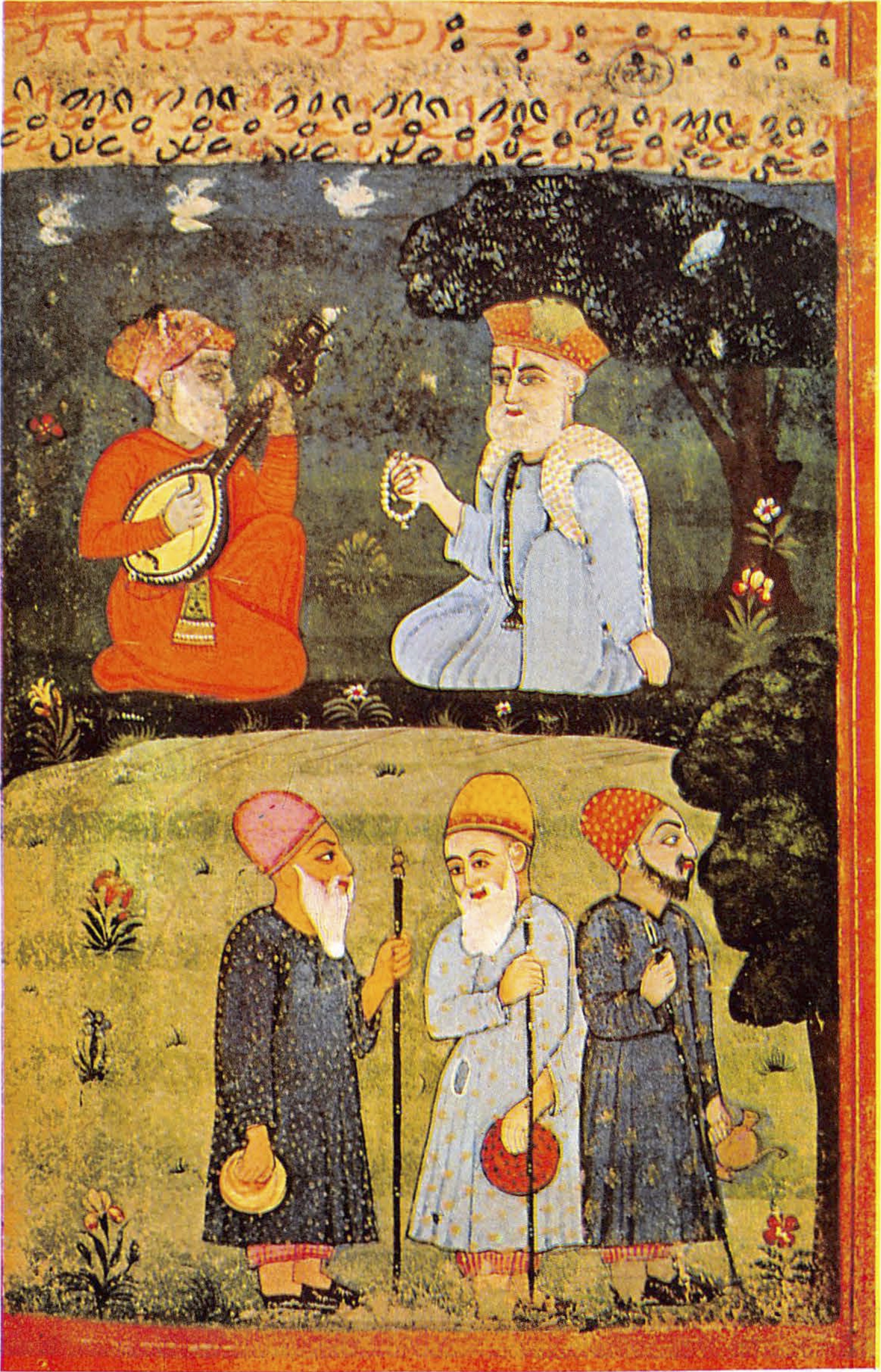
Guru Nanak and Mardana with Muslim Fakirs on their way to Mecca. This painting is found in the B-40 Janamsakhi, written and painted in 1733. The painting was made by Alam Chand Raj

The Golden Temple (Harmandir Sahib) in Amritsar, India is not only a central religious place of the Sikhs, but also a symbol of human brotherhood and equality. The four entrances of the holy shrine from all four directions, signify that people belonging to every walk of life are equally welcome. The Golden Temple is a holy site for Sikhs and is welcome to people of any faith.

Sikhs do not believe in pilgrimages.

Mecca in Saudi Arabia is the central religious place in Islam. Mecca is regarded as the holiest city in Islam, and a pilgrimage to it (Hajj) is one of the pillars of Islam. Non-Muslims are prohibited from entering the city.

== Demography ==
Islam is the second largest religion in the world as of 21st century with around 2 billion followers worldwide including Majority of Sunni and minority Shia, and Major School of jurisprudence Hanafi, shafii, Maliki, Hanbali.

Mystical side of Islam includes Sufi and Islamic moments of Indian subcontinent includes Deobandi and Barelvi

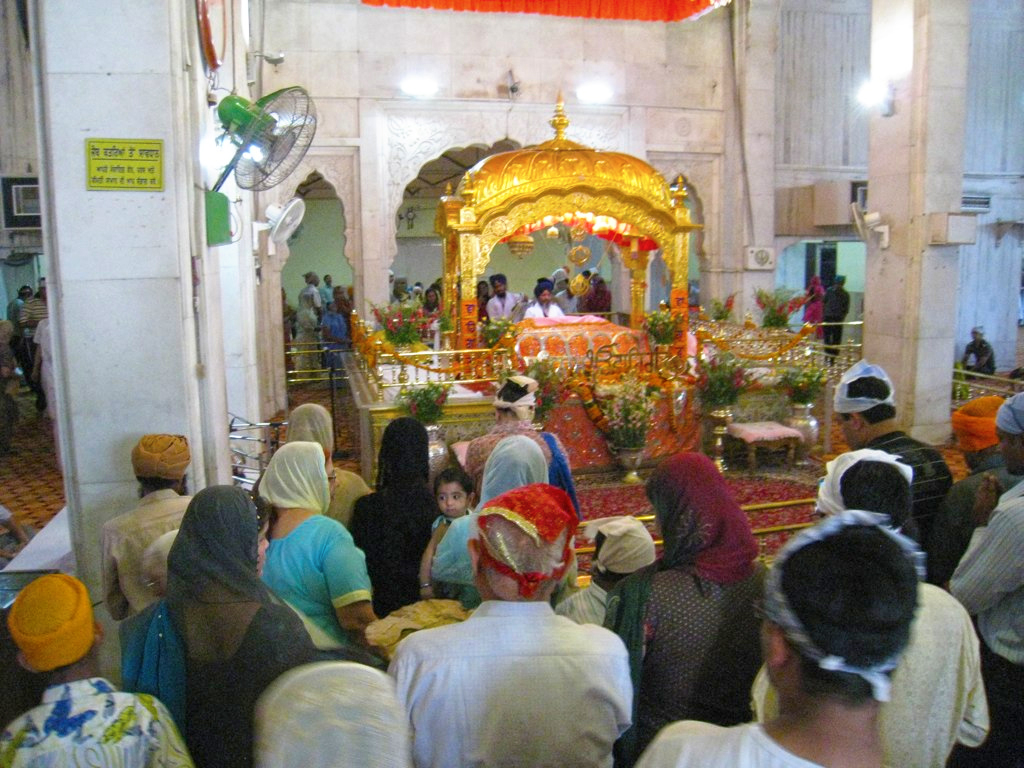
Sikhs praying at Gurudwara, India

While on the other hand, Sikhism is the fifth largest religion in the world as of 21st century with around 30 million followers, if counting Khalsa Sikhs.

== History ==
=== Sikh Gurus ===
During the period of Guru Nanak Dev Ji (the 1st Guru of Sikhism), many people from the lower sections of society joined Sikhi. The main three principles taught by the Guru were, Naam Japna (to remember the one God), Kirat Karni (to live an honourable life), Vand Chakna (to share with others). During this time, although his followers still remained Hindu, Muslim, or of the religion to which they were born, they became known as the Guru ji's disciples, or sikhs. It was here his followers began to refer to him as teacher, or guru. The Guru ji told his followers that they were to be householders and could not live apart from the world—there were to be no priests or hermits. Here is where the Guru ji instituted the common meal, requiring the rich and poor, Hindu and Muslim, high caste and low caste, to sit together while eating. All worked together, all owned the town. Here is where Lehna, later to be Guru Angad, came to be with Guru Nanak Dev ji.

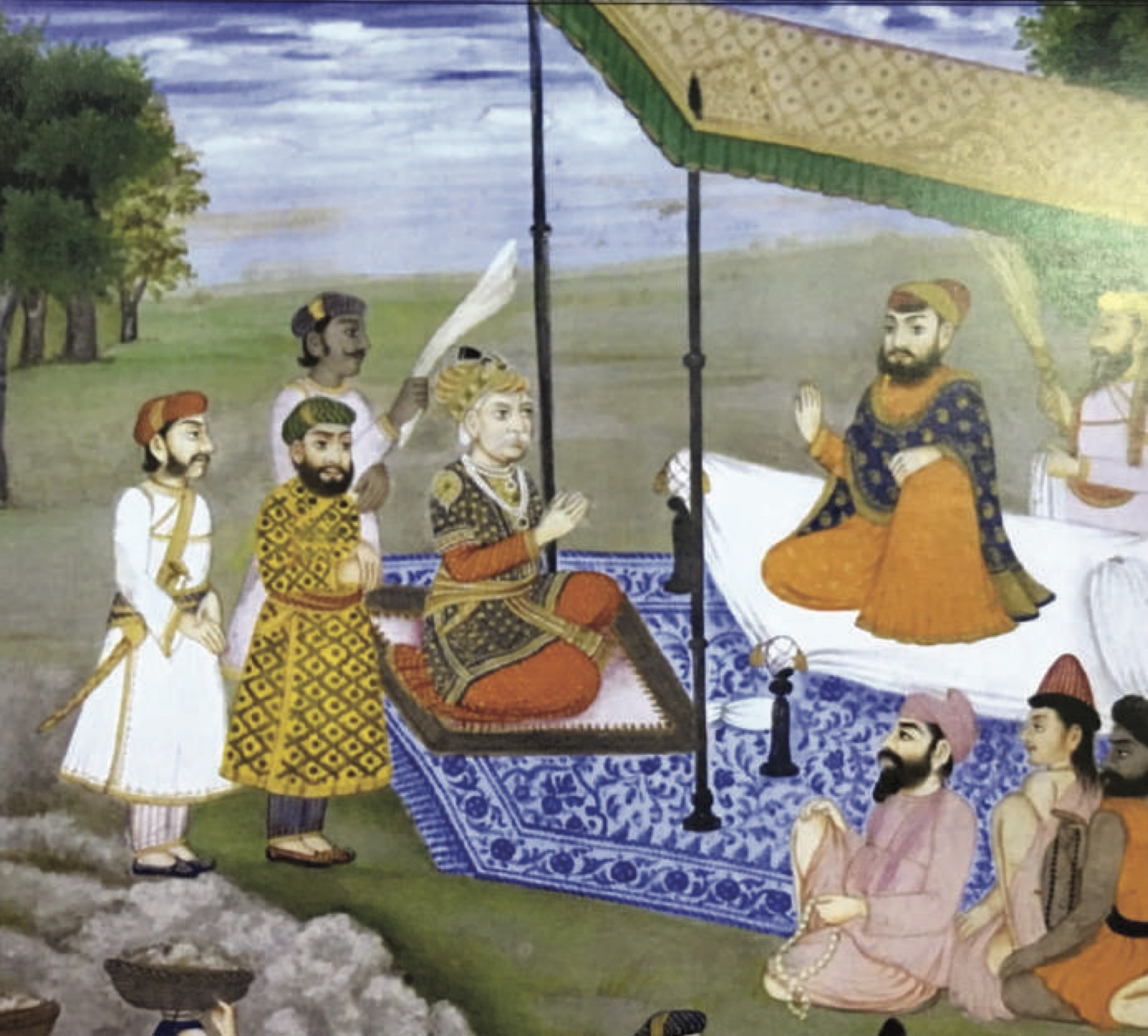
Painting of Mughal emperor Akbar meeting Guru Amar Das in 1567 at Goindwal

During Muslim Emperor Akbar's rule, Sikhism and other religions were accepted and flourished. The Emperor established an Ibadat Khana, which served as a platform for religious debates and dialogues among different communities, including Sikhs. He also visited Guru Amar Das (3rd Sikh Guru) at Goindwal, where he ate at and offered donations for the Langar.

For most of the Mughal Empire, however, Sikh Gurus were persecuted. Guru Arjan (5th Guru), for instance, was executed on the orders of Mughal Emperor Jahangir for refusing to convert to Islam. After the martyrdom of Guru Arjan, Guru Hargobind (6th Guru) saw that it would no longer be possible to protect the Sikh community without the aid of arms. He wore two swords of Miri and Piri and built the Akal Takhat, the Throne of the Immortal, which is the highest political institution of the Sikhs. When Kashmiri Pandits were being forcefully converted to Islam by Aurangzeb, Guru Tegh Bahadur (9th Guru) were beheaded for refusing to convert by Aurangzeb at Chandni Chowk in Delhi. Fellow devotees Bhai Mati Das, Bhai Sati Das and Bhai Dayala were also tortured and executed, while Guru Tegh Bahadur were forced to watch.

Guru Gobind Singh (10th Guru) formed the Khalsa—the Army of the Akal Purakh (Immortal) Two of Guru Gobind Singh's younger sons, Sahibzaade Fateh Singh (aged 7) and Zorawar Singh (aged 9), were bricked up alive by Mughal Governor Wazir Khan in Sirhind, Punjab. When in South India, Guru Gobind Singh sent Banda Singh Bahadur to chastise the repressive Governor of Sirhind. Banda Singh captured Sirhind and laid the foundation of the first Sikh empire. The Nawab of Malerkotla, Sher Mohammad Khan, protested against the execution of the Sahibzaade, after which Guru Gobind Singh blessed the state. Many historians consider this as a reason why Malerkotla was the only city not harmed by Banda Singh Bahadur during his military campaign.

=== Guru Nanak and the Nizari Ismailis ===
While there is no consensus on the issue of Guru Nanak’s faith prior to the advent of Sikhism, one largely overlooked theory proposed by Dominique Sila-Khan in her works, Crossing the Threshold: Understanding Religious Identities in South Asia (2004) and Conversions and Shifting Identities (1997), argues that Guru Nanak was neither Hindu nor Sufi Muslim in the ‘mainstream’ sense, but rather, a Nizari Ismaili Muslim prior to Sikhism’s creation.

=== Sikh Rule ===
The Muslim religious leadership and mosques continuously received state support under Sikh rule. The call to prayer was however banned and many Muslim mosques were descerated and occupied. In the Kashmir Valley, Sikh rule was generally oppressive, although Punjab was governed by Maharaja Ranjit Singh and Kashmir was ruled intermittently by either Hindu or Sikh governors. The region had passed from the control of the Durrani Empire of Afghanistan, and four centuries of Muslim rule under the Mughals and the Afghans, to the Sikhs under Ranjit Singh in 1819. As the Kashmiris had suffered under the Afghans, they initially welcomed the new Sikh rulers, however this perception later changed. The Sikh rulers of Kashmir enacted several anti-Muslim laws, which included handing out death sentences for cow slaughter, closing down the Jamia Masjid in Srinagar, and banning the azaan, the public Muslim call to prayer. Several European visitors who visited Kashmir during Sikh rule wrote of the abject poverty of the vast Muslim peasantry and the exorbitant taxes under the Sikh rulers. High taxes, according to some contemporary accounts, had depopulated large tracts of the countryside. However, after a famine in 1832, the Sikhs reduced the land tax.

=== Sufi Muslims and Sikhs ===
In South Asia alone, there are over 200 million Muslims who are followers of Sufi traditions, the most notable being the Barelvi movement. The Sikh Gurus had cordial relations with many Sufi Saints, and in the Sikh holy book, the Guru Granth Sahib, many Sufi and other Muslim scholars’ quotes and wisdom are featured.

In December 1588, a Sufi saint of Lahore, Mian Mir, visited Guru Arjan Dev at the initiation ceremony before the construction of the Harmandir Sahib (Golden Temple).

The Ahmadiyya Movement is a Muslim reform movement founded by Mirza Ghulam Ahmad (regarded as the Masih and Mahdi) to purify, defend, and proselytizing Islam. Since the 18th century, Sufis and ancestors of Mirza Ghulam Ahmad had cordial relations with Sikhs. Soon, however, the Sufis would have to battle the Sikh Ramgarhia Misl. However, as Ranjit Singh established the Sikh Empire, they pledged their loyalty and joined his army. For their service as commanders, Ranjit Singh returned to them some of the lost territory of their Jagir.

Ahmad Sirhindi, a renowned and influential Sufi philosopher of the 16th and 17th centuries, was hostile to the Sikhs and celebrated the execution of the fifth Sikh guru, Guru Arjan. He wrote a laudatory letter to Shaikh Farid Bukhari (Murtza Khan) with an excerpt quoted [sic] as follows:

"The execution of the accused Kafir of Goindwal at this time is a very good achievement indeed and has become the cause of a great defeat of hateful Hindus. With whatever intention they are killed and with whatever objective they are destroyed it is a meritorious act for the Muslims. Before this Kafir was killed, I have seen a dream that Emperor of the day had destroyed the crown of the head of Shirk or infidelity. It is true that this infidel was the chief of the infidels and a leader of the Kafirs. The object of levying Jazia on them is to humiliate and insult the Kafirs and Jehad against them and hostility towards them are the necessities of the Muhammedan faith."

— Ahmad Sirhindi, No. 193 in Part III of Vol. I of Muktubat-i-Imam Rubbani Hazrat Mujaddid-i-Alf-i-Sani

=== British India and Partition ===
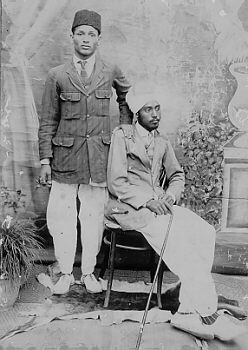
A young Sikh aristocrat and his Muslim friend. Photographed early 1900's, Punjab

During the British Raj, Sikhs and Punjabi Muslims shared brotherhood, both participating in the British Indian Army to whom they showed loyalty during the revolt of 1857.

During the partition of India in 1947, millions of Hindus and Sikhs left Pakistan and moved into India, while millions of Muslims left India and moved into Pakistan; in between this movement, there was much bloodshed. As people from both sides left their homes and belongings to travel across the new border of India and Pakistan, many were killed on trains and land in what is thought to be acts of revenge. Malerkotla was not affected and was viewed as a safe haven for Muslims during the partition. The popular legend associated with it is that the town was not impacted because of Guru Gobind Singh blessing it after its Nawab protested against the execution of the Guru's sons.

Sikhs, under Master Tara Singh, were promised an autonomous region by Muhammad Ali Jinnah on behalf of the Muslim population, as well as by Jawaharlal Nehru and Mahatma Gandhi, on behalf of the majority Hindu community. They feared that Sikhs would join Pakistan if their support was not secured in backing the partition of Punjab. After the former colonial kingdoms and Princely states were being divided along language differences, Punjab and Sikhs were not given any special status in the Constitution Act of India.

== Persecution and attacks ==
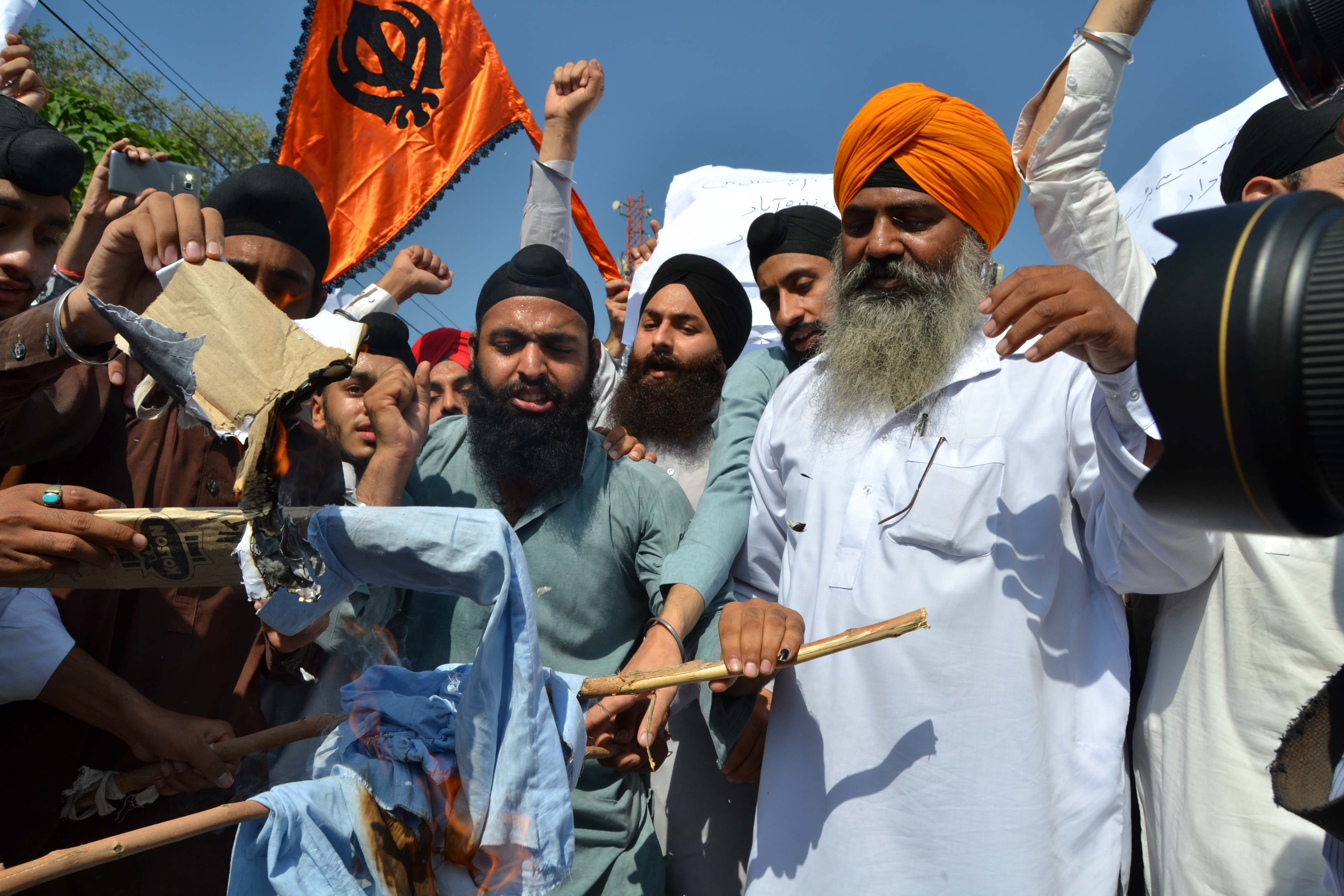
The Sikh community protested in Pakistan for their absence in census of 2017.

In the UK, there have been some instances of tension between Sikhs and Muslims, on allegations that some Muslim men have preyed on Sikh women to forcibly convert them to Islam.

In 2009, the Taliban in Pakistan demanded that Sikhs in the region pay them the jizya (poll tax levied by Muslims on non-Muslim minorities). In 2010, the Taliban attacked many minorities including Sikhs resulting in two beheadings.

In April 2016, two 16-year-old Muslims bombed a gurudwara in the German city of Essen using fire extinguishers that were converted into an explosive device. The devices detonated after a wedding party had left for the reception. A Granthi was injured seriously, while two others were treated for minor injuries. The building itself was damaged severely. One of the teens was in deradicalization program. The two denied that it was religiously motivated, saying it was “just for the kick of building fireworks!” However, before setting off the blast, the two tried to break into another gurudwara in North Rhine Westphalia.

== See also ==
- Islam and other religions
- Ganga Sagar (urn)
- Pir Budhan Shah
- Divisions of the world in Islam
