= Three pillars of Sikhism =

Precepts of the Sikh religion

The Three pillars of Sikhism (Gurmukhi: ਸਿੱਖ ਧਰਮ ਦੇ ਤਿੰਨ ਥੰਮ੍ਹਾਂ), also called three duties, were formalised by Guru Nanak Dev Ji as:

1. Naam Japo: The Guru led the Sikhs directly to practice Simran and Naam Japo—meditation on God and reciting and chanting of God's Name—Waheguru. The Sikh is to recite the Nitnem banis daily in remembrance of the grace and kirpa of the Almighty.
2. Kirat Karo: He asked the Sikhs to live as householders and practice Kirat Karo: to honestly earn, with hard work, by one's physical and mental effort, while accepting God's gifts and blessing. One is to speak the truth at all times. Live a life of decency, high moral values and spirituality.
3. Vaṇḍ Chakkō: The Sikhs were asked to share (the food, Wealth etc.) with everyone, Irrespective of caste, creed, color or sexuality by practising Vaṇḍ Chakkō—“Share and Consume together”. The community or Sadh Sangat is an important part of Sikhism. One must be part of a community that is pursuing the values set out by the Sikh Gurus and every Sikh has to give in whatever way possible to the community. This spirit of Giving is an important message from Guru Nanak.

== Legacy ==
The three pillars of Sikhism were evoked by the Akali Dal's Anandpur Sahib Resolution in 1973 as the base principles to lead the Sikh community.
