= Prem Sumārag =

Sikh text

Folio from a Sikh manuscript of the Prem Sumarag Granth

Prem Sumārag ("the true path/way to love") is a Sikh text written in archaic Punjabi that forms part of the rehat genre of Sikh literature that propounds an ideal Sikh society and way of life pertaining to the Khalsa. The work covers topics related to politics, administration, warfare, civics, and both private and public socio-religious spheres. The work is either dated to the period of Guru Gobind Singh or later in the 18th century, with its authorship being attributed variously, to the guru himself, the Kavi Darbar, or later writers. The work is dated to the early 19th century by W. H. McLeod while J. S. Grewal and Gurinder Singh Mann believe it dates to the period of Guru Gobind Singh or near it. Portions of the text were translated into English by John Leyden. G. S. Mann described the work as a "proto-rahitnama". J. S. Grewal described the work as a "theory of Sikh social order".

== Structure ==
The work is divided into chapters (dhiāo) and sub-chapters (bachan), with notable sections being as follows:

- Dhiāo I: A prologue that references the Bachittar Natak of the Dasam Granth with the grand mission of the Khalsa being to eliminate evil and promote goodness, with the author claiming to expound the code of conduct for the Khalsa to abide by to achieve this divine aim
  - Bachan II: It prescribes its own Nitnem format for Sikhs to follow along with general precepts to abide by and describing transgressions
  - Bachan III: description of Khalsa principles rituals, including for the initiation ceremony
  - Bachan IV: the rituals to be conducted following a child's birth
  - Bachan VI: emphasis on cleanliness and intoxicants to avoid
  - Bachan VII: clothing to be worn and occupations to engage in
- Dhiāo VII: A description of the death rites
  - Bachan VII: admonishes the Masands and Patits
- Dhiāo VIII: An analysis on Sikh polity and statecraft, with the author promoting monarchism (with an absolute but benevolent monarch) as the ideal system for Sikh governance, with power resting with the ruler aided by a minister (with the ruler expected to be secular with a special consideration for the Khalsa) rather than the corporate Panth. Feudal administrative structures, such as the mansabdari and jagirdari systems, are promoted. Punjabi, written in Gurmukhi, is promulgated as the official language of this hypothetical Sikh polity. As per Parkash Singh Jammu, this particular bias toward monarchism may reveal that this portion may have been interpolated during the Sikh Empire of Ranjit Singh.
- Dhiāo IX: Relates to inheritance, taxation, interest, debts, property, agriculture, slavery, animals, and gardens
- Dhiāo X: An epilogue that pushes for the concept of sahaj jog (a state of contentment) as being the ideal form of human life, reached via spiritual practices and will

== Manuscripts and publication ==
Manuscripts bearing a colophon of 1701 and 1707 exist. However, according to Parkash Singh Jammu, the earliest discovered manuscript of the work bears a date of writing of 1801. A manuscript of the work was procured by Ernest Trumpp, which was deposited in 1872 into the Bavarian State Library in Germany. In 1940, Randhir Singh discovered a damaged manuscript of the work, which he revised by using another, extant manuscript from Punjab Public Library. The work existed in manuscript form and was first published in print in 1953 by the Sikh History Society, Amritsar. A second print edition was published in 1965 by New Book Company, Jalandhar.

== See also ==
- Begampura (Ravidas)
