= Hukamnama =

Hymn from the Guru Granth Sahib taken as an order

A Hukamnama (Punjabi: ਹੁਕਮਨਾਮਾ, translit. Hukamanāmā) refers to a hymn from the Guru Granth Sahib which is given as an injunction, order, or edict to Sikhs. It also refers to edicts issued by the contemporary Takhts. In the historical sense, it was used to refer to an issued commandment, instruction, injunction, order, or edict given by one of the Gurus of Sikhism or their officiated followers and associates during their lives.

Nowadays, after the period of human gurus, the Hukumnama refers to a hymn from a randomly selected left-hand side page from the Guru Granth Sahib on a daily basis in the morning. This is seen as the order of God for that particular day. The Hukamnama is distributed and then read aloud in Gurdwaras throughout the world. The verse taken from this ceremony is referred to as Vak or Hukam.

== Etymology ==
Hukamnama, is a compound of two words hukam, meaning command or order, and namah, meaning statement.

== History ==
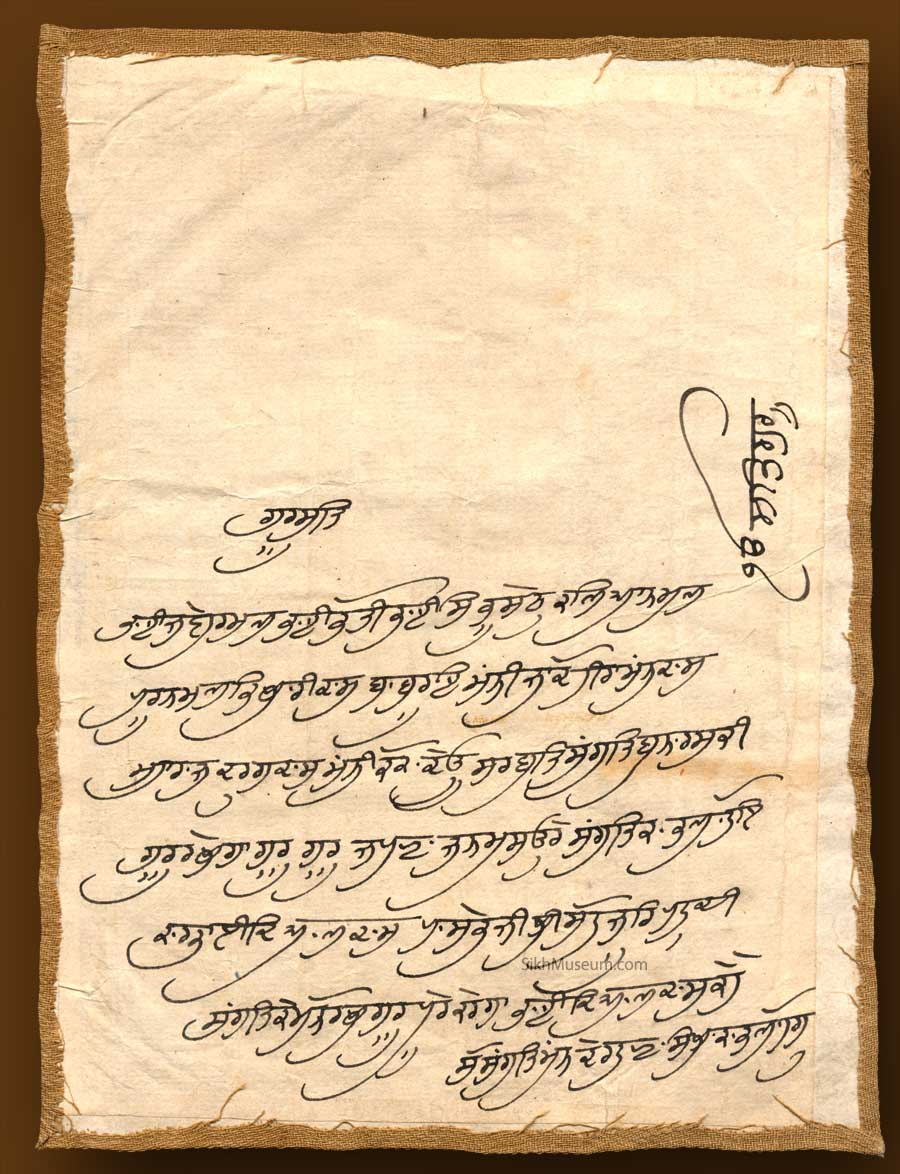
A Hukamnama attributed to Guru Tegh Bahadur addressed to the local congregation of Varanasi, ca.1665-1675

Historically, the hukamnamas were epistles or letters issued by the Sikh gurus to sangats (congregations) across the Indian subcontinent. The tradition of issuing hukamnamas began in the period of the early seventeenth century, during the time of Guru Hargobind. The earliest surviving hukamana documents date to his guruship period. However, Gurinder Singh Mann suggests that the genre of hukamnama literature predates the period of the sixth Sikh guru, perhaps to the period of Guru Amar Das, based upon a manuscript kept at Guru Nanak Dev University, Amritsar. (Note: See Hukamnama Mahala 3, MS 913 Airha, Guru Nanak Dev University, Amritsar, ff. 319-322.)

Hukamnamas issued by the Sikh gurus were addressed to specific families or congregations (sangats). They covered various subjects, such as the standards of Sikh ethical conduct (rehat), the characteristics of Sikh socio-religious organization, and requesting for materials, some examples being gold or horses, that the Sikh congregations in distant regions were asked to bring or send to the main headquarters of the Guru for the greater community's needs. The hukamnamas had a common format and structure. They began with an invocation to the divine, in the name of Akal Purakh or Waheguru. Next, the names of particular congregations, community leaders, family heads (with women being mentioned on some surviving examples), and the detailed instructions of the letter that is addressed to the aforementioned to fulfill. The congregations and families that these letters were addressed to held these documents in reverence and preserved them as religious tokens.

During the guruship period of Guru Gobind Singh, these hukamnamas were issued akin to royal decrees from Anandpur. The Guru would dictate what is to be written and a scribe would physically write it down in the form of the letter. Sometimes, the letters were decorated by illumination. Each letter was assigned a specific serial number before they were sent-off to be delivered to the addressee. The hukamnamas were written in Persianized Punjabi in scriptio continua (larivaar) with no punctuation marks.

== Collections and research ==
The Sikh gurus issued many edicts throughout their life, some of whom have been preserved and are documented in various writings by scholars. A collection of hukamnamas, whose gathering is attributed to Randhir Singh, have been studied. Serious academic research into the hukamnamas only began in the early 20th century. After the passing of Guru Gobind Singh, hukamnamas were also issued by his widow, Mata Sahib Kaur and by his disciple, Banda Singh Bahadur. Hukamnamas were also issued by esteemed Sikh women, with there existing two related to Mata Gujari, nine of Mata Sundari, and nine related to Mata Sahib Devan.

The Sikh Reference Library located at Amritsar held many authentic hukamnamas. These were lost after the events of Operation Blue Star in 1984. This collection was studied and published in two separate books by Ganda Singh and Shamsher Singh Ashok in the late 1960's. A collection of hukamnamas is preserved in the collection of Buta Singh, descendant of the original custodians of the Bhai Rupa family. A collection of hukamnamas was published by Balwant Singh Dhillon in 2025 after researching the documents since 1978.

As per Chawla (2024), the historical hukamnamas are "invaluable historical documents", since many of them are internally dated correctly by the original scribe, giving information regarding the dates of certain events from Sikh history, which assists with creating a proper chronology of Sikh history. Additionally, the names of people they are addressed to and locations mentioned can help with the re-construction of the demographics and spread of early Sikhism. Furthermore, they are useful for studying the development of Punjabi prose literature and Gurmukhi script.

== Example ==
Taken from Advanced Studies in Sikhism page 33 by Jasbir Singh and Harbans Singh, the following is an example Hukamnama by Guru Gobind Singh:

Sarbat sangat Kabul Guru rakhe ga

Tusa ute asaadee bahut khusi hai
Tusi Khande da Amrit Panja to lena
Kes rakhne...ih asadee mohur hai;
Kachh, Kirpan da visah nahee karna
Sarb Loh da kara hath rakhna
Dono vakat kesa dee palna karna
Sarbat sangat abhakhia da kutha
Khave naheen, Tamakoo na vartana
Bhadni tatha kanya-maran-vale so mel na rakhe
Meene, Massandei, Ramraiye ki sangat na baiso
Gurbani parhni...Waheguru, Waheguru japna
Guru kee rahat rakhnee
Sarbat sangat oopar meri khushi hai.

— Patshahi Dasvi
Jeth 26, Samat 1756

To the entire congregation at Kabul.

The Guru will protect the congregation,
I am pleased with you all.
You should take baptism by the double edged sword, from the Five Beloveds.
Keep your hair uncut for this is a seal of the Guru,
Accept the use of shorts and a sword.
Always wear Iron Kara on your wrist,
Keep your hair clean and comb it twice a day.
Do not eat Halal (Kosher) meat,
Do not use tobacco in any form,
Have no connection with those who kill their daughters and wives.
Or permit the cutting of their children's hair.
Do not associate with Meenas, Massands and Ram-raiyas (anti-Sikh cults)
Recite the Guru's hymns
Meditate on "The Name of our Wondrous Enlightener (God)",
Follow the Sikh code of discipline
I give the entire congregation my blessing

— Signature of 10th Guru, Jeth 26, 1756 Bikrami 23 May 1699 A.D

== Gallery ==
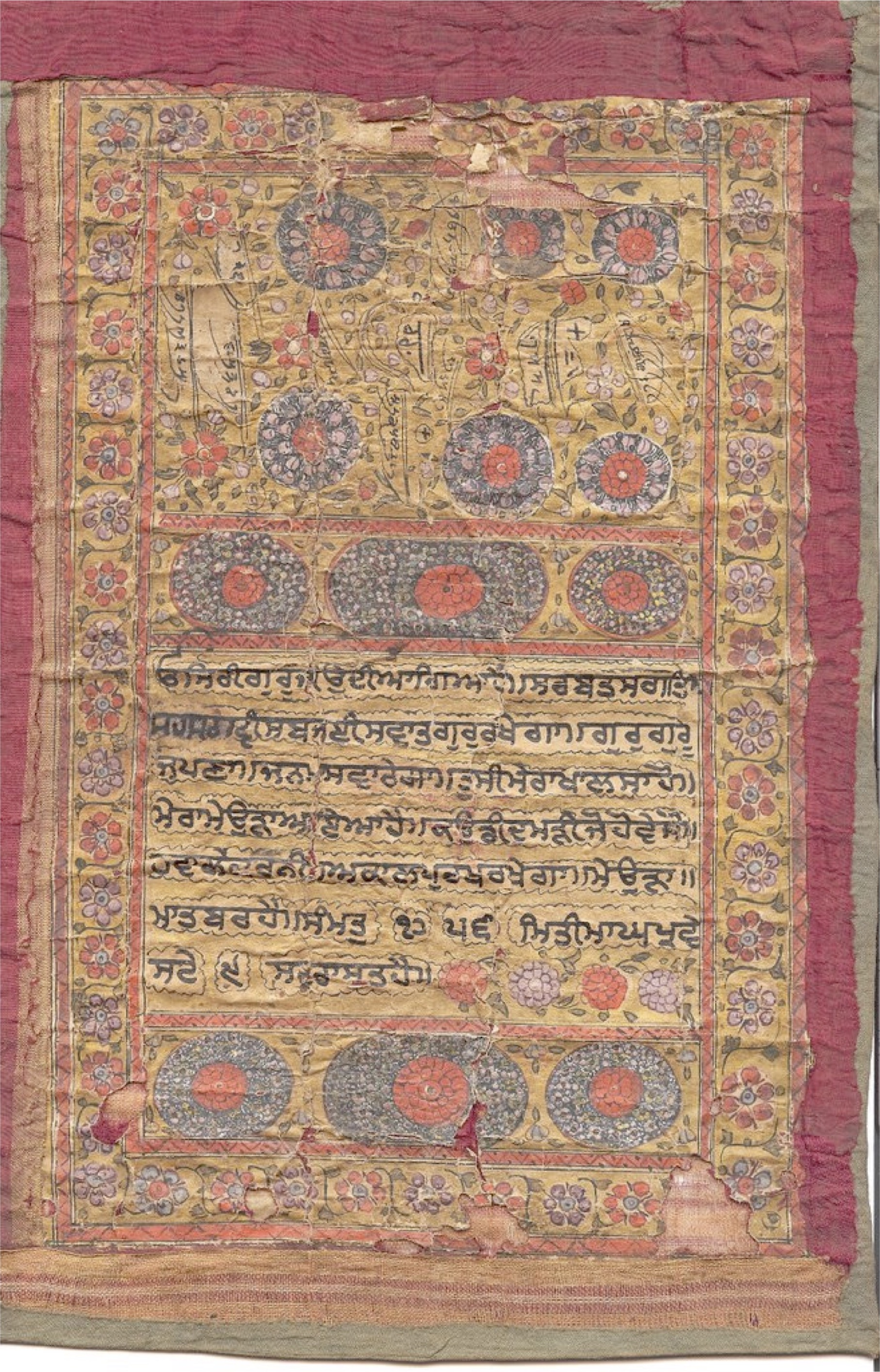
Illuminated hukamnama issued by Guru Gobind Singh in 1699 on the date of Samat 1756, Magh Pravaste 9

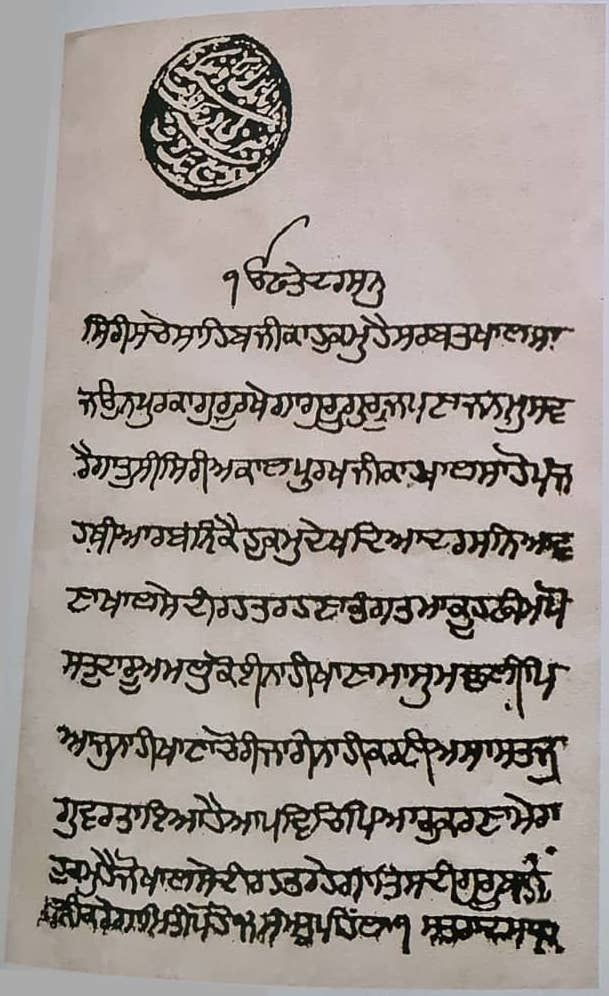
Issued edict (hukamnama) of Banda Singh Bahadur containing his official seal at top of page

== See also ==
- Gurmata, a term used to refer to binding resolutions issued by the Sarbat Khalsa
- Rakhi system, the protection tax implemented by the Sikh Confederacy
- Hukam
