= Ganga Sagar (urn) =

Sacred relic which belonged to Guru Gobind Singh

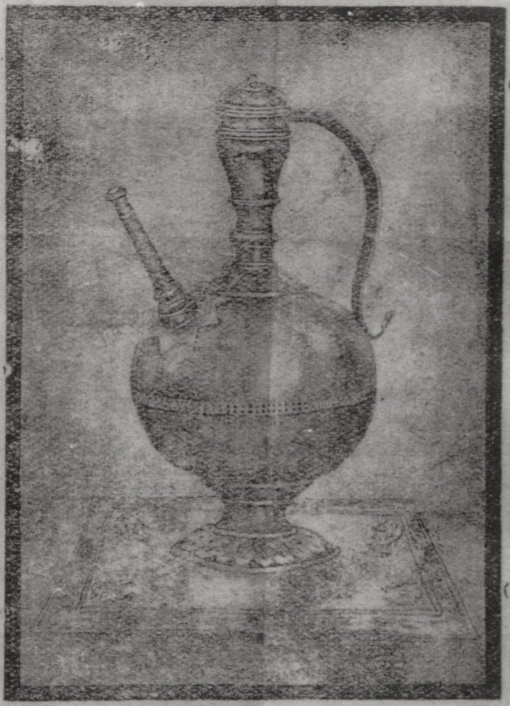
Pre-partition depiction of the Ganga Sagar during the stewardship of Rai Inayat Khan

Ganga Sagar (Punjabi: ਗੰਗਾ ਸਾਗਰ), is the name given to the sacred relic which belonged to the tenth guru of Sikhism, Guru Gobind Singh. It is a traditional copper urn of the 17th century, which weighs approximately half a kilo gram and is less than 1 foot in height. It has about two hundred holes carved throughout the rim of the base. Historical significance is given to this relic because it is believed that Guru Gobind Singh drank milk out of this in 1705.

== History ==
The history of the ganga sagar has been recorded after the current protector, Rai Azizullah Khan researched historical public records preserved by the British Raj. In 1705, Guru Gobind Singh, turned towards the city of Raikot after walking through the Machiwara Jungle. At Raikot, Noora Mahi, a cattle grazer first met the Guru while he was looking for water to drink. He requested Noora Mahi to bring him water or milk in the Ganga Sagar (one of the personal belongings of the Guru). However Noora Mahi refused as the buffalo had already been milked and even if it were to give milk, the Ganga Sagar would not be able to contain it due to the holes carved around its base. Despite Noora Mahi's claims, the Guru ordered Noora Mahi to say the name of God, rub the belly of the cow and pour the milk in the Ganga Sagar. To Noora Mahi's surprise, the cow gave milk and the milk did not spill through the holes of the Ganga Sagar. Astonished, Noora Mahi told his chief the incident and led him to meet with the Guru. At the meeting Rai Kahla, the present Muslim chief of Raikot, welcomed the Guru, not only risking his position as chief but his own life and the life of his family and subjects from Aurangzeb.

Three days later, on January 5, 1705, when leaving the shelter provided by Rai Kahla, the Guru presented Rai Kahla with two of his belongings, a sword and the Ganga Sagar, as a token of gratitude. The sword is currently located in a museum in New Zealand, while the Ganga Sagar has been in custody of the Rai family for decades now. It remained in the haveli of Raikot till 1947, until it was moved to Pakistan with the partition of India as the Rai family relocated.

== Guardian ==
The current guardian of the Ganga Sagar is Rai Azizullah Khan; an ex-parliamentarian of Pakistan. The Ganga Sagar has been in the protection of Khan since 1975 and has been in the Rai family for nine generations, with Rai Azizullah Khan being a direct descendant of Rai Kahla. After the partition of india the Ganga Sagar was relocated to Kamalia, Pakistan with Rai Anayat, the grandfather of Khan. After his death in 1953, it was inherited by Khan's father, Rai Fakirullah, who, died four years later in 1957, leaving Khan's grandmother as protector of the Ganga Sagar. Before her death, she handed over the protection of the sacred relic to Rai Azizullah Khan who since then had kept it in Pakistan. In 2004, he moved it to United Kingdom, where it was kept in a bank vault. It has since been moved to Canada where it is also kept safe in a bank vault. Of the nine protectors of the Ganga Sagar, each generation of the Rai family has had only one male descendant born to the family to inherit the duty as guardian of the Ganga Sagar. Khan, too, has only one son, out of five children, who will one day inherit the duty as protector of the Ganga Sagar.

== Darshan ==
Prior to partition, the Rai family annually held a large, three-day celebration called darshan, celebrated at Gurdwara Tahlianaa Saheb, to mark the stay of Guru Gobind Singh ji in Raikot in 1705. The last event of the celebration would end with a public display of the Ganga Sagar by the Rai family. However, since the partition, despite the relocation of the people associated with the Ganga Sagar and Guru Gobind Singh Ji, the event is still held from January second to fourth annually. It is considered a major event and manages to attract a large number of people from all over Punjab including prominent poets and artists. Instead of the public display of the Ganga Sagar, a rally circulating approximately six kilometers takes place to conclude the celebration at the Gurdwara Tahlianaa Saheb. Tahlianaa Saheb's front wall consists of an inscription describing the journey Guru Gobind Singh Ji made to Raikot, and of the token of gratitude he left for Rai Kahla (the Ganga Sagar). However, no picture of the Ganga Sagar is displayed at the gurdwara.

== See also ==
- Guru Gobind Singh
- Sikhism
- Gurpurab
- Raikot
- Aurangzeb
- Sikh art and culture
- Sikhism in Pakistan
- Islam and Sikhism
