= Sangat (Sikhism) =

Sikh congregation

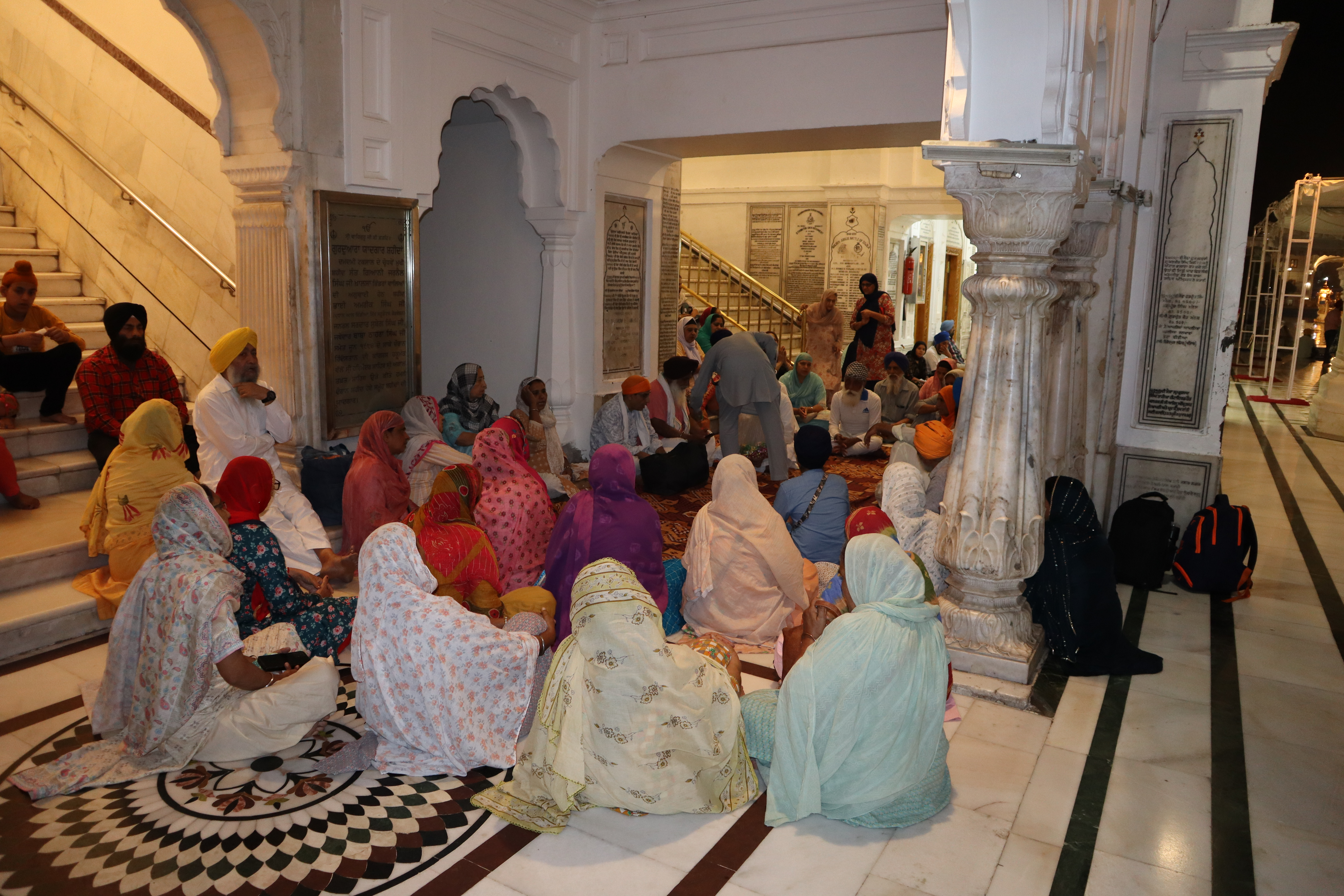
Photograph of a sangat of Sikh pilgrims at the Golden Temple complex, Amritsar, Punjab, India, April 2023

In Sikhism, sangat refers to the community of followers, sometimes referred to as a "congregation." The religion teaches that coming together to form a sadh sangat is ideal, consisting of devotees of the Sikh gurus.

== Philosophy ==
In Sikh teachings, humans are considered especially precious amongst all the creatures, as they have the ability to realize the true nature of the world and its divinity. Furthermore, the religion stresses upon the universal equality of mankind. As per Sikh teachings, society (a creation of humans) became corrupted over time. Originally simple, egalitarian, and consisting of the family-unit to meet needs and protection, maya led societies to become unequal and hierarchal, with the original intention of coming together being lost. The masses became oppressed by the rulers through threat of violence, the distinction between what is right and wrong becomes blurred and not defined, compared to not knowing if one is awake or in a dream. Thus, society (described as comprising three gunas, triguni) is seen as contradictory and subjagative, a product of maya (with society being called Doja Bhaau, meaning "second love") and rampant with vices, with a rejection of the truth. To counter society, the Sikh gurus prescribed the formation of the sadh sangat or satsangat, composed of members who are in remembrance of divinity, which allows people to move close to hukam (the natural or divine order) rather than haumai (egotism) and violence. Finally, gurmat does not incline toward individualism.

== History ==
Guru Nanak had organized his followers into sangats, with a meeting between two Sikhs coming to be termed sadh sangat. A gathering of five Sikhs came to be known as panj parmeshar. Dharamsals were constructed as religious spaces for these sangats, which were later succeeded by gurdwaras. By the period of Guru Amar Das, a system of India-wide sangats had been established.

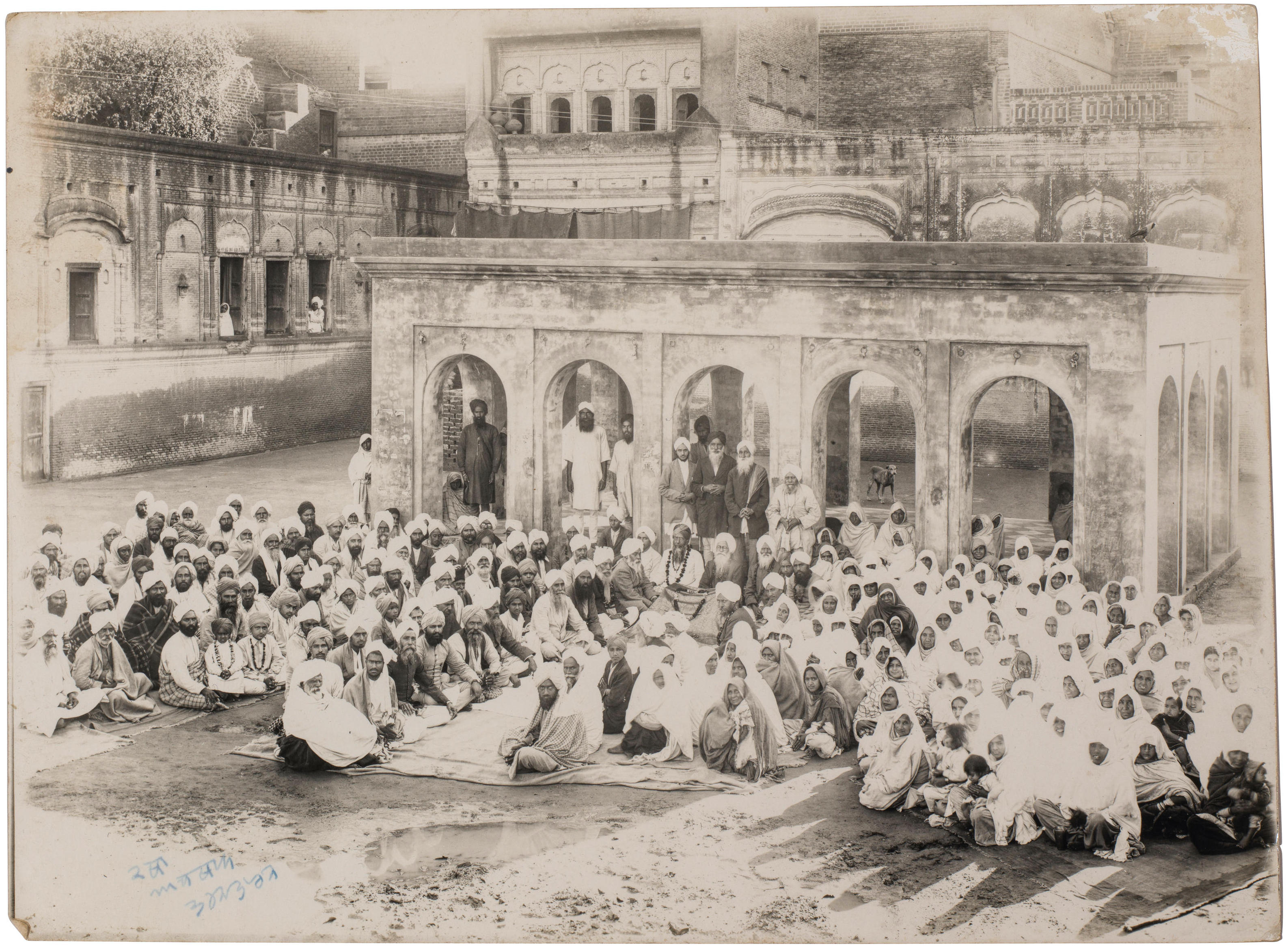
Photograph of a Sikh congregation at the Katha Asthan in Tarn Taran, circa late 19th or early 20th century

There were Manji dioceses composed of sangats Sikhs in a particular area. Guru Ram Das, the fourth guru, established the masand system to oversee sangats. The sangats contributed their dasvandh tithe to their local religious overseer, who would submit them to the Sikh guru to form a common-fund. Over time, the masands became corrupt and therefore Guru Gobind Singh abolished them and established direct contact with the sangats himself, not relying on any intermediaries. After the abolishment of the masands, the sangats brought their donations to the guru themselves when they visited him during festivals. Hukamnamas (letters or epistles) were issued by the Sikh gurus to various sangats across the Indian subcontinent.
