= Naam Japo =

Meditation or vocal singing of hymns in Sikhism

In Sikhism, Nām Japō (Punjabi: ਨਾਮ ਜਪੋ, pronunciation: [näːm d͡ʒəpo]), also known as Naam Japna or Naam Simran, is the remembrance of God or the Akal Purkh, the supreme formless power that is timeless and immortal, through the meditation or contemplation of the various Names of God (or qualities of God), especially the chanting of the word "Waheguru" ('Wonderful Lord') representing the formless being, the creator of all the forms, and the being omnipresent in all forms.

Less commonly, it is the vocal singing of hymns from the Guru Granth Sahib; Singing of hymns with musical accompaniment is generally referred to as kirtan. While contemplating God's names a devotee is able to get nām, the divine connection with God. Through nām, the devotees are able to harness Godly qualities and remove the five thieves.

== Overview ==
Nām Japna is the remembrance of God or the Akal Purkh, the supreme formless power that is timeless and deathless, by repeating and focusing the mind on a single repetition of one of God's various names or qualities. A particular name or phase is administered to someone when they are initiated into the Sikh faith more often than not this is the Mul Mantar, which is repeated throughout the Guru Granth Sahib. Many other names are also found in Guru Gobind Singh's Jaap Sahib, which contains 950 names of God. The guideline in the Rehat Maryada of Guru Gobind Singh demands that the Sikh engage in Nām Simran as part of his or her daily routine.

Nām Japō is one of the three pillars of Sikhism, along with Kirat karō and Vaṇḍ chakkō. Critical importance is given to the meditation in the Guru Granth Sahib as the way in which humans can conquer ego, greed, attachment, anger and lust, together commonly called the Five Evils or Five Thieves and to bring peace and tranquility into one's mind. The Sikhs practice both the quiet individual recitation of Naam in one's mind, commonly called Naam Simran, and the loud and communal recitation of Naam, called Naam Jaap. However, this is not a strict definition of these phrases.

This Nām Simran (recitation of nām or literally merging with the nām) is believed to have immaculate properties Guru Arjan further describes the benefits of Nām in Sukhmani Sahib (beacon of peace prayer, Raga Gauri), Ashtapadian (eight couplets) 1-3, such as it to cure all pain, destroy ego and difficulties, and for it to save even your enemies.

In the Guru Granth Sahib:

With my hands I do God's work; with my tongue I sing God's Glorious Praises.
With my feet, I walk on the Path of my Lord and Master. ((1))
It is a good time, when I remember Him in meditation.
Meditating on the Naam, the Name of the Lord, I cross over the terrifying world-ocean. ((1)(Pause))
With your eyes, behold the Blessed Vision of the Saints.
Record the Immortal Lord God within your mind. ((2))
Listen to the Kirtan of God's Praises, at the Feet of the Holy.
Your fears of birth and death shall depart. ((3))
Enshrine the Lotus Feet of your Lord and Master within your heart.
Thus this human life, so difficult to obtain, shall be redeemed. ((4)(51)(120))

— Guru Granth Sahib, page 189

== See also ==
- Names of God in Sikhism
- Japji Sahib
- Jaap Sahib
- Shabda
- Sikh philosophy
- Outline of Sikhism
- Meditation
