= Rehat =

Sikh codes of conduct

Rehat (Punjabi: ਰਹਿਤ, alternatively transliterated as Rehit, Rahit, or Rahat) refers to the rules and traditions which govern the unique Sikh lifestyle and determines correct Sikh orthodoxy and orthopraxy. The Sikh Rehit Maryada (Punjabi: ਸਿੱਖ ਰਹਿਤ ਮਰਯਾਦਾ, Sikkh Rahit Maryādā; also transcribed as Sikh Reht Maryada or Khalsa Rehat Maryada) is a code of conduct and conventions for Sikhism. The final version of the Rehat Maryada was controversially approved by the Shiromani Gurdwara Parbandhak Committee, Amritsar in 1945. The Rehat Maryada was created to provide guidance to Sikhs (and those desirous of embracing the Sikh faith) on practical and functional aspects of daily life, including the operations of Sikh Gurdwaras, and religious practices to foster cohesion throughout the community. Rehitnāma (meaning "epistles of conduct; plural: Rehitnāme) is a Punjabi term that refers to a genre of Sikh religious literature which expounds upon specifying an approved way of life for a Sikh.

== Etymology ==
Rehat derives from the Punjabi word rahiṇā (to live, to remain) and means "mode of living". Maryādā derives from a Sanskrit compound word composed of marya (limit, boundary, mark) and ādā (to give to oneself, to accept, to undertake), meaning bounds or limits of morality and propriety, rule, or custom.

== History ==
Before the passing of the 10th Sikh Guru, Guru Gobind Singh, in 1708, he transferred the Guruship and authority to the Sikh Holy Scripture, Guru Granth Sahib, and the body of initiated Sikhs, called the Khalsa Panth. Before his death, Guru Gobind Singh provided what is known as 52 Hukams and instructed his followers to formalize them by writing Rehat Namas. The 52 Hukams are a set of 52 rules on proper conduct. As per Dr. William Hewat McLeod, these set of rules were transcribed into the Rehatnamas by Sikh scholars Bhai Nand Lal, Bhai Dessa Singh, son of Bhai Mani Singh, Bhai Chaupa Singh, Bhai Daya Singh and Bhai Prahlad Singh. However, for the next almost 100 years, persecution at the hands of Mughal rulers put the affairs of Sikh faith into disarray. The control of Sikh Gurdwaras and affairs fell into the hands of Udasis and Nirmala Sikh, who had embraced vedic philosophy. According to scholars of the time such Bhai Vir Singh these Nirmala and Udasi Sikhs introduced vedic concepts into the Sikh Rehat, which led sectarianism in the absence of any centralized authority apart from that arranged under British rule from 1849. A range of other codes and collections of tradition existed, which were corrected in 1898 by Bhai Kahn Singh Nabha, who collected all the old Rehat Namas and removed spurious references to Hinduism.

=== 1699-1925 ===
While the Khalsa was gaining political power in the 18th century, a large number of sehajdharis began joining its ranks from around the mid-18th century onwards. Sehajdharis Sikhs practiced religion in a more fluid manner without following boundaries, in-contrast to the Khalsa Sikhs, which had always been a small minority. This presented a paradigm where as Sikhs gained political power, they further relapsed back into Hinduism. Sikh theology began to be re-interpreted under a Brahminical lens, such as in relation to the varnasramadharma. Sikh rehatnamas (codes of conduct) from this period, such as Chaupa Singh's, are heavily influenced by Hindu practices, especially with regard to the status of women and interactions with Muslims. These manuals were more akin to the stridharma (moral system for women) laid out in Hindu texts, such as the Dharamshastra.

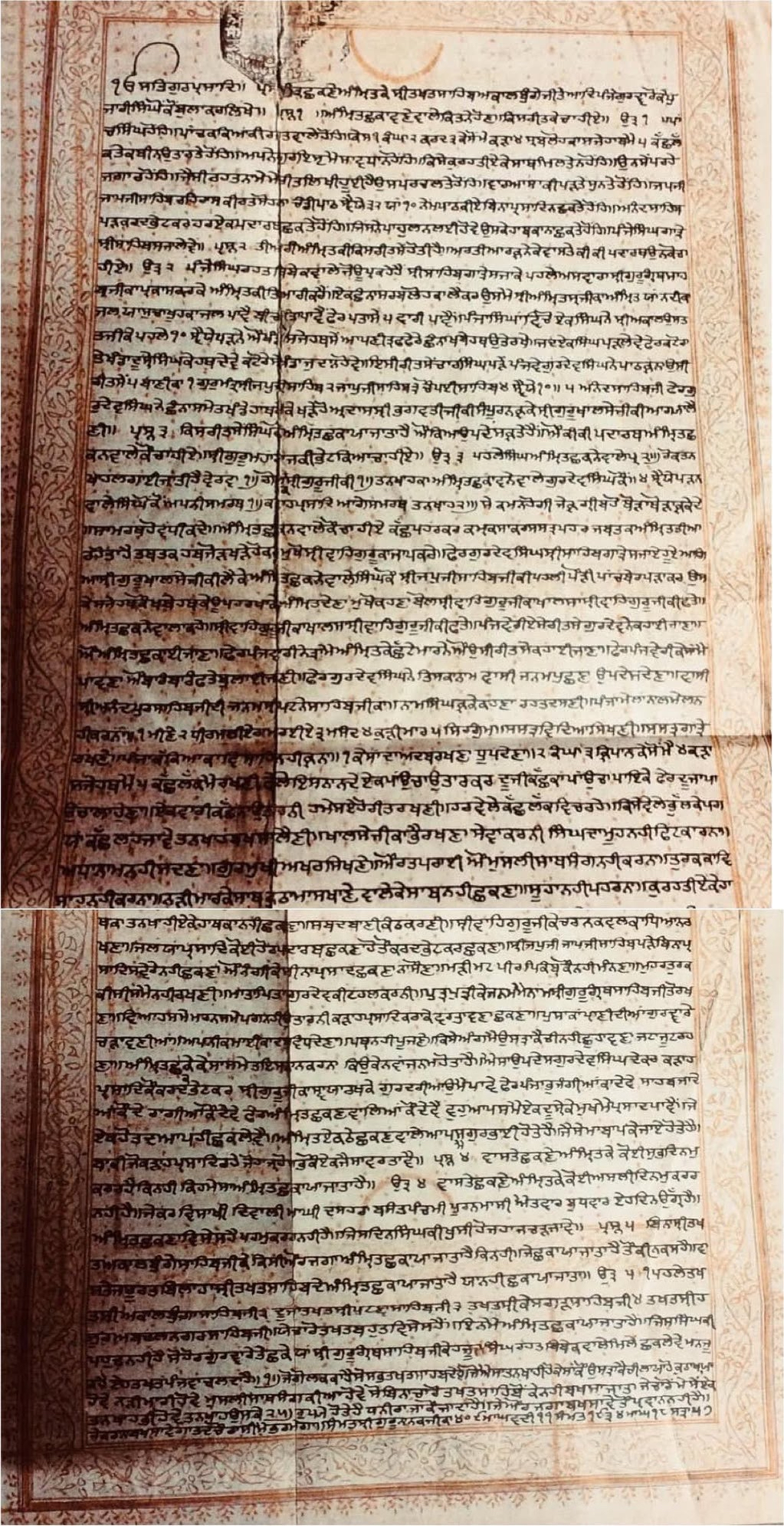
Rehat Maryada document issued by the Akal Takht in the year 1877. It is written in larivār Gurmukhi

There was no standard rehat but there were many with the same points and concepts, like the Muktinamah (ਮੁਕਤੀਨਾਮਾਹ), Bhai Nand Lal's Rehatnamah (ਰਹਿਤਨਾਮਾਹ, 1695) and Tankhahnamah (ਤਨਖਾਹਨਾਮਾਹ, circa 1704), 54 Hukams (੫੪ ਹੁਕਮ) etc. Early rehats were recorded in manuscripts of the works Sri Gur Katha and Das Gur Katha (both works dated to the late 17th century), with the latter containing an abridged version of the Prahlad Singh (Rai) rehatnama. As per Giani Gian Singh (1885), in 1857, Bhai Rai Singh travelled and stayed at Hazur Sahib, Nanded, (where the 10th Guru, Guru Gobind Singh receded) for 3 1/2 months to document and reproduce the code of conduct of the Sikhs at the time for the Namdhari sect of Sikhism. As per Dr. McLeod (1987), several books were published during this period that attempted to provide a renaissance to the faith. Budh Singh published Khalsa Dharm Shatak in 1876, Kahn Singh Nabha wrote Raj Dharm (1884), Ham Hindu Nahin (1898) and Mahan Kosh (1930), Gurmat Sudhakar (1898 Hindi, 1901 Punjabi). In 1915, Chief Khalsa Diwan published Gurmat Parkash Bhag Sanskar while Teja Singh Bhasaur published Khalsa Rahit Parkash in 1911 and Bhai Jodh Singh's Gurmati Niranay was published in 1932. Finally Sikh Rahit Maryada was brought out by the SGPC in 1945. These publications showed a significant attempt by the Sikh intelligentsia and bodies to develop appropriate code of conduct reflective of the Sikh philosophy.

The early Sikh rahit namas were markedly anti Mughal, the rahits derided Mughals as being "polluting"; injunctions included avoiding contact with the ritually sacrificed meat of all faiths, a ban on sexual contact with Muslim women, and a proscription on all intoxicants. Furthermore, an early rahit-nama asserted that karah parsad, whilst to be distributed to everyone irrespective of their religious background, was not to be consumed by a Sikh in the company of a Mughal. William Hewat McLeod writes that these injunctions were a reflection of a period of extended warfare between the Sikhs and Muslims during the seventeenth and eighteenth centuries. Pashaura Singh writes that the Tat Khalsa scholars refused to accept the anti Muslim injunctions and remarks as the work of Guru Gobind Singh and quietly removed them from their revised rahit-namas. Six Rahitnamas were placed in the time of Guru Gobind Singh, the Tankhahnama of those in particular stresses hostility towards Mughal Aristocrats, referred to as "Turks". Although there was unanimous hostility and antipathy directed towards Mughals in the Sikh writings of the eighteenth and nineteenth century, the works of Chaupa, Kesar Singh Chibbar, and Koer Singh are considered the apotheosis of this aversion. The twentieth century versions of the rahit; drawing upon and furthering developing earlier forms of rahits were representative of an effort to systemize codes presented in different versions and modify them in line with the evolving Sikh orthodoxy associated with the Singh Sahba reform movement. W.H McLeod further comments that while Guru Gobind's utterance of the rahit does not oppose nor is it inconsistent with the traditional version used today, it is suggested that he announced a considerably simpler one. Only a portion of the current Rahit dates to the time of Guru Gobind Singh, and it evolved according to the conditions and circumstances of the time. While the early eighteenth century rahits feature considerable variation; W.H. McLeod noted a few consistent features among them;

"a sense of deepening problems and the ultimate triumph of the community; a set of behavioral injunctions meant to distinguish the Sikhs from other religious communities; with a clear sense that the Sikh community saw itself in conflict with Muslims; and, within several versions, the declaration of a Vaishnava savior in relation the triumph of the community."

Louis Fenech (2003) notes that the eighteenth century Sikh literature consisting of the rahit-namas and gur-bilas genres impart hostile attitudes towards Muslims and Islam and mention that Muslims were desirous of converting all Indians. He also noted that while the eighteenth century rahits disagreed on many points, a universal belief that the Khalsa was the principal sovereign not just of India, but the entire world, was accorded among them, and that many of the earliest rahit-namas violated certain Sikh precepts in the Guru Granth Sahib- including observation of caste status. He also notes that the eighteenth and nineteenth century Sikh manuscripts proclaimed Guru Gobind Singh to be the avatar of Vishnu and four of the five Panj Pyare as the incarnations of a Hindu demigod (Lava) and three Hindu bhakts (the exception being Himmat Singh- considered an incarnation of a hunter). He adds that the Tat Khalsa expunged the Hindu elements of the Panj Pyare tradition within these manuscripts. The Tat Khalsa's origins are said to be influenced by contemporary nineteenth century European understanding of religion and modernity; their objective became to reduce the Sikh faith of its contemporary plurality, multiplicity and diversity to a single solidarity identity centered around the Khalsa and to inculcate firm religious boundaries within the community through various methods including purging content they deemed offensive and non Sikh in the early rahit-namas and the permuting of Sikh history towards a certain trajectory.

Many Sikhs today assert that during the early 1800s, many Brahmanical and other Hindu influences came into the writings of Sikhs, which led to a "corruption" of the rehitnamahs.

=== 1925–27 ===
In 1925, the Sikh Gurdwaras Act was made in Punjab, legislating the establishment of the Shiromani Gurdwara Parbandhak Committee (SGPC), an elected body of Sikhs, for the purpose of administering Gurdwaras.

A general meeting of the SGPC was held on 15 March 1927 to establish a subcommittee with the task of producing a draft Code of Conduct. The subcommittee at the time consisted of 29 high-profile Sikhs, listed by name in the Introduction to the Sikh Rehat Maryada.

=== 1931–32 ===
A preliminary draft was circulated to Sikhs in April 1931, for comment. The subcommittee met on the 4th and 5 October 1931, then on the 3rd and 31 January 1932, at the Akal Takht in Amritsar. During this time the number of subcommittee members present at meetings reduced, and other people were listed as present.

On March 1, four members were exited from the subcommittee, and eight more were appointed. Of the four who were exited, one had died and another was excommunicated. The subcommittee met again to deliberate and consider the draft on 8 May and 26 September 1932. On 1 October, the sub-committee submitted its report to the SGPC Secretary recommending a special session of the Committee be convened to consider the final draft and approve it for acceptance.

=== 1933–36 ===
The SGPC arranged a conclave of Sikhs on 30 December, where 170 individuals attended and debated the draft. Only nine attendees were members of the original sub-committee, and the conclave ultimately failed to reach an agreement. The SGPC then received comments on the draft from a subcommittee of 50 individuals and 21 Panthic Associations (including international organisations), all of whom are listed in the Introduction to the Sikh Rehat Maryada.

After nearly three years, on 1 August 1936, the broader subcommittee approved the draft, and the general body of the SGPC ratified it on 12 October 1936. Thereafter, the Rehat was implemented.

=== 1945 ===
At their meeting on 7 January 1945 the SPGC's Advisory Committee on Religious Matters recommended some changes to be made to the Code. The Advisory Committee consisted of eight individuals as listed in the Preface to the Sikh Rehat Maryada. The SGPC accepted the recommendations at their meeting on 3 February 1945. Since then, several minor updates have been made to clarify content, but no significant review has been undertaken.

== Principal points of the Sikh Rehat Maryada ==
The Sikh Rehat Maryada ordained by the SGPC addresses key issues such as the definition of a Sikh, personal and communal obligations such as meditation and volunteer service, rules for gurdwara services to include appropriate music and festivals, and the conduct of assorted Sikh ceremonies.

=== Definition of Sikh ===
A Sikh is defined as any person, male or female, who faithfully:

- believes in the existence of One Eternal God
- follows the teachings of, and accepts as their main Spiritual guides, the Guru Granth Sahib and the ten human Gurus
- believes in the baptism (Amrit Sanchar), as promoted by the tenth Guru

=== Sikh living ===
There are two aspects to a Sikh living: first is the adherence to a personal discipline and the development of a strong family life; the other is the involvement in communal life and to ensure community well-being and infra-structure for support of the weak within the community local and globally. This is the practical aspect of the three pillars of Sikhism promoted by Guru Nanak called Vand Shakko ('share what you eat [or have]').

A Sikh is always to live and promote the tenets stipulated by the Gurus.

- Belief in One God
- Equality of All the Human race
- Respect for All, irrespective of gender, age, status, color, caste, sexual orientation, etc.
- Self-Control – Kill the Five Evils; no rituals or superstitions; no gambling, tobacco, alcohol, intoxicating drugs, etc.
- Self-Improvement – Promote the Five Virtues

==== Communal life ====
In the communal life, the Sikh has a duty to actively contribute to the community outside the family unit. A Sikh should undertake free voluntary service (seva) within the community at Gurdwaras, community projects, hospitals, old peoples homes, nurseries, etc. At every opportunity, a Sikh ought to dedicate their free time to voluntary community work, and devote at least 10% of their wealth in time or money to support community projects. This also includes positively supporting weaker members within the community.

Community service can be within the Sikh community or the public more broadly. All projects which benefit the community and promote Gurmat principles should be supported. A healthy community life is envisioned through continuous dialogue and understanding with all members of the larger community, including inter-faith dialogue, treating everyone as equals, and respecting their religions and customs. Importance is given to co-operation and supporting the poor and weak.

Seva in its simple forms can be: sweeping and washing the floors of the Gurdwara, serving water and food (langar) to or fanning the congregation, offering provisions or preparing food and doing other 'house keeping' duties.

Guru ka Langar ('Guru's free food') is a very important part of Sikhism. When langar is being served or when sangat is being sat down “Sat-Naam Waheguru" must be chanted. The main philosophy behind the langar is two-fold: to provide training to engage in seva and an opportunity to serve people from all walks of life; and to help banish all distinctions between high and low castes.

==== Personal life ====
In their personal life, a Sikh should live humbly and with love in an extended family group encouraging Gurmat principles and offering moral support within this extended structure. A Sikh should undertake free voluntary service (seva) within the community at Gurdwaras, community projects, hospitals, old peoples homes, nurseries, etc. At every opportunity, a Sikh ought to dedicate their free time to voluntary community work, and devote at least 10% of their wealth in time or money to support community projects. This also includes positively supporting weaker members within the community.

Following the teachings of the Sri Guru Granth Sahib, the Sikh is commanded by the Gurus to lead a disciplined life and to not blindly follow rituals and superstitions that bring no spiritual or material benefit to the person or community. A Sikh must not eat meat that has been slaughtered in a ritualistic way (Kutha meat) and refrain from using all forms of intoxicants; hence, alcohol and tobacco are strictly prohibited. Sikhs must also refrain from rituals, superstitions and other anti-Sikh behavior such as gambling, etc. The Sikh is to practice and promote complete equality between the genders, castes, races, religions, etc. Apart from their spouse, a Sikh must treat all people as their kin; treat all females as daughters, sisters, or mothers, and males as sons, brothers, or fathers, depending on their age.

The Sikh is to meditate on God's Name (Naam Japna or Naam Simran) and recite the holy scriptures. This includes remembering God at all times and reciting his name whenever possible. The Sikh is to arise in the early hours and recite Nitnem, a collection of Gurbani to be read in the morning (Five Banis), evening (Rehras), and night (Kirtan Sohila), followed each time with the Ardas prayer. The Ardas signifies that the Sikh need only seek the support of the Almighty Lord before beginning any new task or venture.

A Sikh must also follow the principle of Kirat Karni, thereby leading their life in accordance with the Guru's teachings. This includes engaging in an honest profession, work, or course of study, as well as promoting the family way of life giving time to children in an active way so as to ensure their proper awareness of the Sikh way of life.

=== Meditation and scripture ===
Sikhs engage in personal and communal meditation, Kirtan and the study of the holy Scriptures. Meditating and understanding of the Guru Granth Sahib is important to the development of a Sikh. One should not only study Gurmukhi and be able to read Gurbani but also understand the meaning of the text. Translations and other material may be used to assist the Sikh. The Sikh should revert to the Guru Granth Sahib for the all spiritual guidance in one's life.

=== Congregation and Gurdwara service ===
It is believed that a Sikh is more easily and deeply affected by Gurbani when engaged in congregational gatherings. For this reason, it is necessary for a Sikh to visit Gurdwaras, the places where the Sikhs congregate for worship and prayer. On joining the holy congregation, Sikhs should take part and obtain benefit from the joint study of the holy scriptures.

No one is to be barred from entering a Gurdwara, no matter in which country, religion, or caste he/she belongs to. The Gurdwara is open to all for the Guru's darshan (seeing the holy Guru) and Langar. However the person must not have on his/her person anything, such as tobacco or other intoxicants, which are tabooed by the Sikh religion. Shoes must be removed, one's head must be covered, and respectful clothing is a must.

During service (seva) in a Gurdwara and while congregational sessions are in session, only one activity should be done at a time in one hall in the presence of the Guru—performing of kirtan, delivering of discourse, interpretative elaboration of the scriptures, or the reading of the scriptures. Before taking a hukam from the Guru, an ardas must be done: all the congregation would stand for the ardas and then sit down and carefully listen to the Hukam of the Guru.

==== Kirtan ====
Sikhs, as well as anyone with correct pronunciation and understanding of Gurbani who desires to take part in the congregation, perform kirtan (spiritual hymn singing) in a congregation and only hymns (shabad) from the holy scriptural compositions in traditional musical measures should be sung. Only shabads from Guru Granth Sahib Ji Gurbani and the compositions of Bhai Gurdas and Bhai Nand Lal, may be performed. It is improper to sing kirtan to rhythmic folk tunes or popular film tunes.

==== Akhand Paath and Sadharan Paath ====
An Akhand Paath is the non-stop reading of the Guru Granth Sahib carried on during difficult times or during occasions of joy and celebration. The reading takes approximately forty eight hours of continuous and uninterrupted reading by a relay of skilled Gurbani readers. The reading must be done in a clear voice and with correct and full pronunciation. Reading the Gurbani too fast, so that the person listening in cannot follow the contents, is discouraged and is considered as disrespect for the Scriptures and the congregation (sangat).

A Sadharan Paath is a non-continuous reading of the Guru Granth Sahib and one can take from seven days to many months to complete the full reading of the 1430 Anga of the text.

=== Festivals and ceremonies ===
The important Sikh festivals that are celebrated include Gurpurbs, in celebration of the birthday and other important anniversaries (martyrdom, etc.) from the lives of the Gurus; and Vaisakhi, celebration of the first Amrit Sanchar and Harvest festival.

Along with other rites and conventions, Sikh ceremonies include:

- Naam Karan: baby naming ceremony
- Amrit Sanchar: Initiation into the Khalsa
- Anand Karaj: marriage ceremony
- Antam Sanskar: funeral ceremony

== List of rehitnamas ==
There are a number of rehitnamas, including many attributed to the 18th century, including:

- Bhai Jaita's Rehatnama (late 17th century) found in Sri Gur Katha
- Tankhahnama (Nasîhatnâme): dated to Samvat 1776 (1718–1719 CE), ten years after Guru Gobind Singh died. According to W. H. McLeod, it has been wrongly attributed to Nand Lal. Malhotra believes the work may have been authored during the period of Guru Gobind Singh and not after his death.
- Prahlad Rai Rehitnama: dated to the 1730s by W. H. McLeod and associated with Prahlad Rai.
- Sakhi Rehat ki (or Sakhi Rahit Patshahi 10): dated to the 1730s by W. H. McLeod and to the period of Guru Gobind Singh by J. S. Grewal
- Chaupa Singh Rehitnama: (dated to 1740–1765 by W. H. McLeod, 1700 according to Piara Singh Padam, and between 1750 and 1765 as per Harjot Oberoi). As per J. S. Grewal and G. S. Mann, the prologue and the rahit parts of this rehitnama date to the period of Guru Gobind Singh while two narratives and the tankhah section of it were added later. Chaupa Singh was a member of the Guru's retinue. He was entrusted with the care of infant Gobind Das by Guru Tegh Bahadur. Some members of Chaupa Singh's family became martyrs with Guru Tegh Bahadur in Delhi and others served under the 10th Guru.
- Desa Singh Rehitnama: dated to the late 18th or early 19th century by W. H. McLeod
- Daya Singh Rehitnama: dated to the late 18th or early 19th century by W. H. McLeod
- Prem Sumarag: dated to the early 19th century by W. H. McLeod while J. S. Grewal and Gurinder Singh Mann believe it dates to the period of Guru Gobind Singh or near it.
- Sikh Rehat Maryada

== See also ==
- Prohibitions in Sikhism
- Cannabis and Sikhism
- Diet in Sikhism
