= Masand =

Tithe collector in Sikhism

A masand was a representative, religious preacher, and tithe collector in Sikhism. They were an officially appointed missionary minister representing the Sikh Guru, who baptized conversions to Sikhism, and collected dasvandh (tithe) as an offering to the Sikh community and religious establishment. A masand forwarded the collected amount to the Sikh guru.

The masand has been described as being territorial deputies or vicars. The appointing of a masand conferred a distinct and unique Sikh status upon specific areas, occasions, and rituals.

== Etymology ==
The word masand (Punjabi: ਮਸੰਦ) is an adaptation of the Persian term 'masnad' (Punjabi: ਮਸਨਦ), which refers to 'a seat' that is at a lower level than the throne. The Guru was the highest authority while masands were emplaced to spread the message of Sikhism and given the authority to baptize individuals converting to Sikhism. During conversions happening in the absence of the Guru, the new convert would touch the feet of the masand or drink the water they had dipped their toe in, in order to become initiated into the Sikh religion.

== History ==
=== Origin and structure ===
It is unclear when the masand system started. It began with Guru Amar Das in some accounts, by Guru Ram Das in other accounts, or Guru Arjan by still other accounts. A masand was appointed for each religious administrative unit called the Sikh Manji, a system that was founded by Guru Amar Das. This system was expanded by later Sikh Gurus.

=== Role ===
The main responsibility of the masands was collecting dasvandh donations and submitting them to the guru on a regular-basis, procuring receipts of donations against them.

Sikh Gurus had established a Masand system of Sikh representatives who taught and spread the teachings of the Sikh Gurus and also collect monetary offering to maintain armed legion of saint-soldiers. It was comparable in its conception to the diocese and wilayats of Christianity and Sufism. Over time, this system became corrupted.The masand system was critical in empowering Sikhism with an independent economic resource pool, that helped pay for gurdwara buildings, for building the Sikh Army and the upkeep of Sikh soldiers, as well routine expenses such as langar (kitchen) which offered a free meal to visitors to the Sikh gurdwaras.

The masands were appointed to collect revenue and gifts from the distant dharamsals and congregations for the central Sikh authority, where they were responsible for bringing it to. The masands from various parishes would congregate with the Sikh guru at his durbar (court) on the occasion of Vaisakhi and present the funds and offerings of the dharamsals under their management to him. They managed distant congregations at a regional and provincial level, such as their finances and inns, and conducted missionary activities. They were assisted in their duties by gumashitas (deputies), which they had the power to appoint. The gumashitas helped manage the group of dharamsals in a province or region, especially ones located in small towns, under the purview of a masand head. Some masands grew in prominence and influence to such a level that even regions falling out of their assigned region were controlled by them, such as in the case of the masands of Patna, Burhanpur and Kabul managing the dharamsals located in Northeast India, South India, and the Pashtun belt region comprising modern-day Khyber Pakhtunkhwa.

Masands who were unable to attend the meeting with the Sikh Guru at his durbar would present their collections and offerings in the form of a hundi (bill of exchange).

The manji and masand system of revenue collection for gurdwaras and other purposes was a source of major dispute between the Sikh Gurus and the Mughal emperors. For example, Aurangzeb seized the tithe collections by the masands for use by the Mughal treasury, and demolished gurdwaras throughout Punjab to emphasize the Islamic character of the Mughal Empire.

Positions of local masands was not dynastic nor inheritable and it was not a professional duty as they still had to live the life of a householder. They were not allowed to claim divine status for themselves.

Masands should not be confused with manjidars.

==== Initiators ====
The masands would also act as a representative of the Sikh guru when initiating new members into the religion. According to the Dabestan-e Mazaheb, the 'sahlang' term referred to person(s) initiated into the Sikh religion by a masand, who acted as representatives on behalf of the Sikh gurus. Such Sikhs were termed as meli or masandia, and were differentiated from Sikhs who had received their initiation rites directly from a Sikh guru, whom were termed as Khalsa. If the guru was not present in a certain area, water would be poured over the toes of the masand or sangatia responsible for the area of that particular manji (early Sikh religious administrative unit) and the initiates would drink that water instead, a practice known as charan-amrit. If neither the guru or a local religious head is present, such as in a distant or tiny community of Sikhs, then the initiate would dip their toe in water and the local congregation would drink it. This initiation ceremony finds mention in the Vaaran authored by Bhai Gurdas. The ceremony was a way of showing the humbleness of initiates to the faith. This practice continued until 1699, when it was replaced by Guru Gobind Singh's innovation.

=== Abolition ===
Over time, a few masands became corrupt and started treating themselves as gurus to collect money for their personal motives. Hence, Guru Gobind Singh ordered Sikhs not to recognize those masands as authority figures and prohibited having any type of relationship with them or their deputies. According to early Sikh literature including rehatnamas, the Sikhs, under Guru Gobind's command, punished, beat and killed certain masands whose corruption, exploitation, and greed or inability to deliver sufficient money and resources had affronted the Guru.

== List of masands ==
=== During the time of Guru Hargobind ===
- Bakht Mal (of Kabul)
- Tara Chand (of Kabul)

=== During the time of Guru Tegh Bahadur ===
- Bidhi Chand
- Ramdas Ugar Sain

=== During the time of Guru Gobind Singh ===
- Gulaba Chand (of Machhiwara)

== See also ==
- Manji system, Sikh missionary administrative organization aimed towards the masses
- Piri system, a sub-system of the Sikh missionary administrative organization aimed towards women
- Sects of Sikhism
