= Manji (Sikhism) =

Sikh religious administrative unit

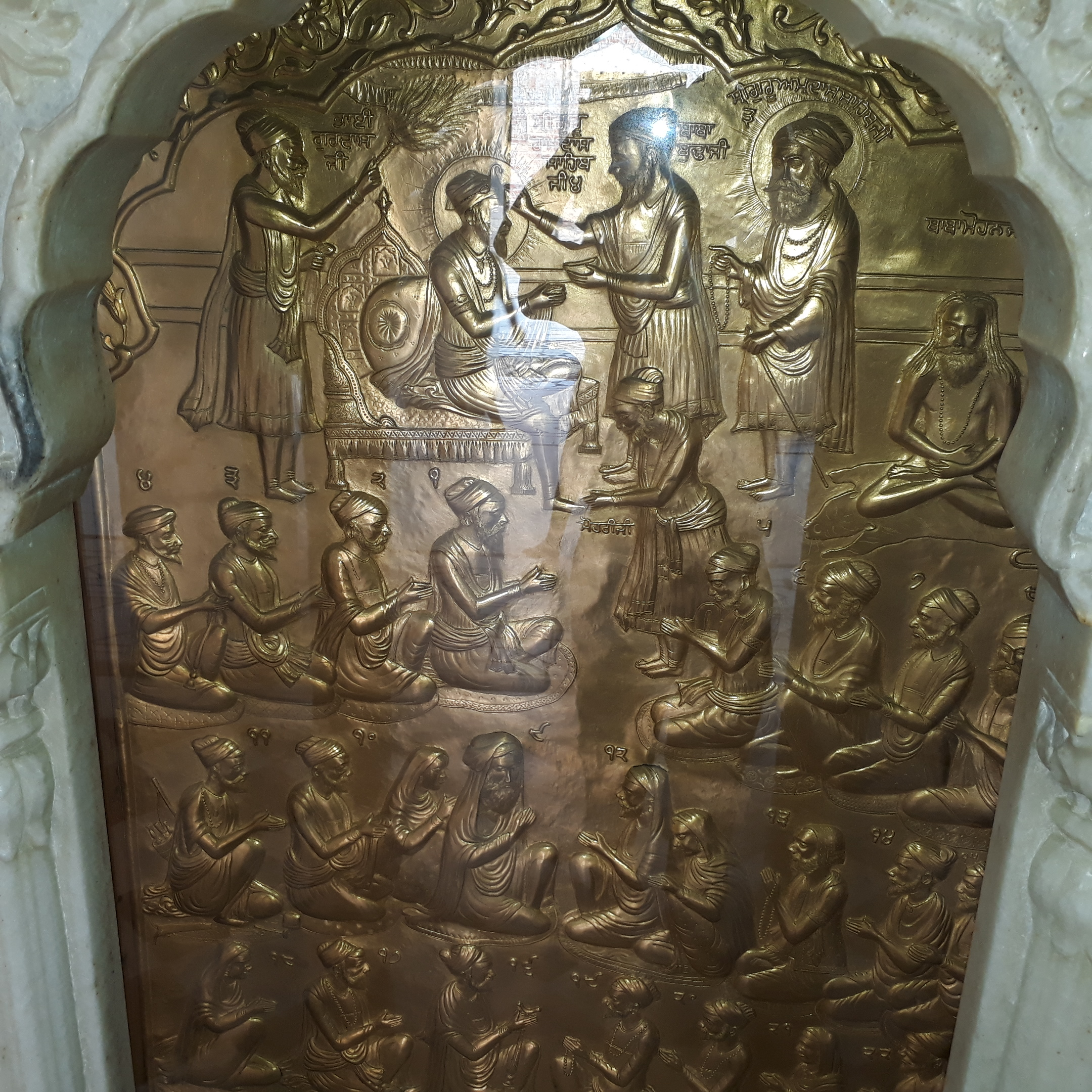
Brass plaque at Gurdwara Chaubara Sahib Goindwal depicting scene of Guru Ramdas being enthroned to Guruship in the presence of regional Manji heads

A Manji (Punjabi: ਮੰਜੀ ਪ੍ਰਥਾ (Gurmukhi)) was a Sikh religious administrative unit, similar to a parish or diocese, for the propagation of Sikhism. It was part of the Sikh missionary administrative organization founded by Guru Amar Das, the third Guru of Sikhism.

== Etymology ==
The word Manji or Manja literally means a cot (taken as the seat of authority in this context).

== History ==
=== Origin ===
Guru Nanak would arrange early Sikh followers into various sangat (congregations) or parishes and instructed them to erect a dharamsal dedicated to spreading their Guru's message and teachings in their local area.

==== Sangatia ====
Sangatia (also spelt as Sangtias) were head leaders from the local Sikh congregation (sangat) who arose as local leaders based upon personal piety and merit. Anyone could arise to become a Sangatia as there was no established priestly or clergy-class in Sikhism, as long as they were well-learnt and dedicated enough to the religion. Most dharamsals ceased being headed by a Sangatia after the introduction of the Manji and later Masand systems. However, some remained under the leadership of a Sangatia due to the respect some earned.

=== Establishment ===
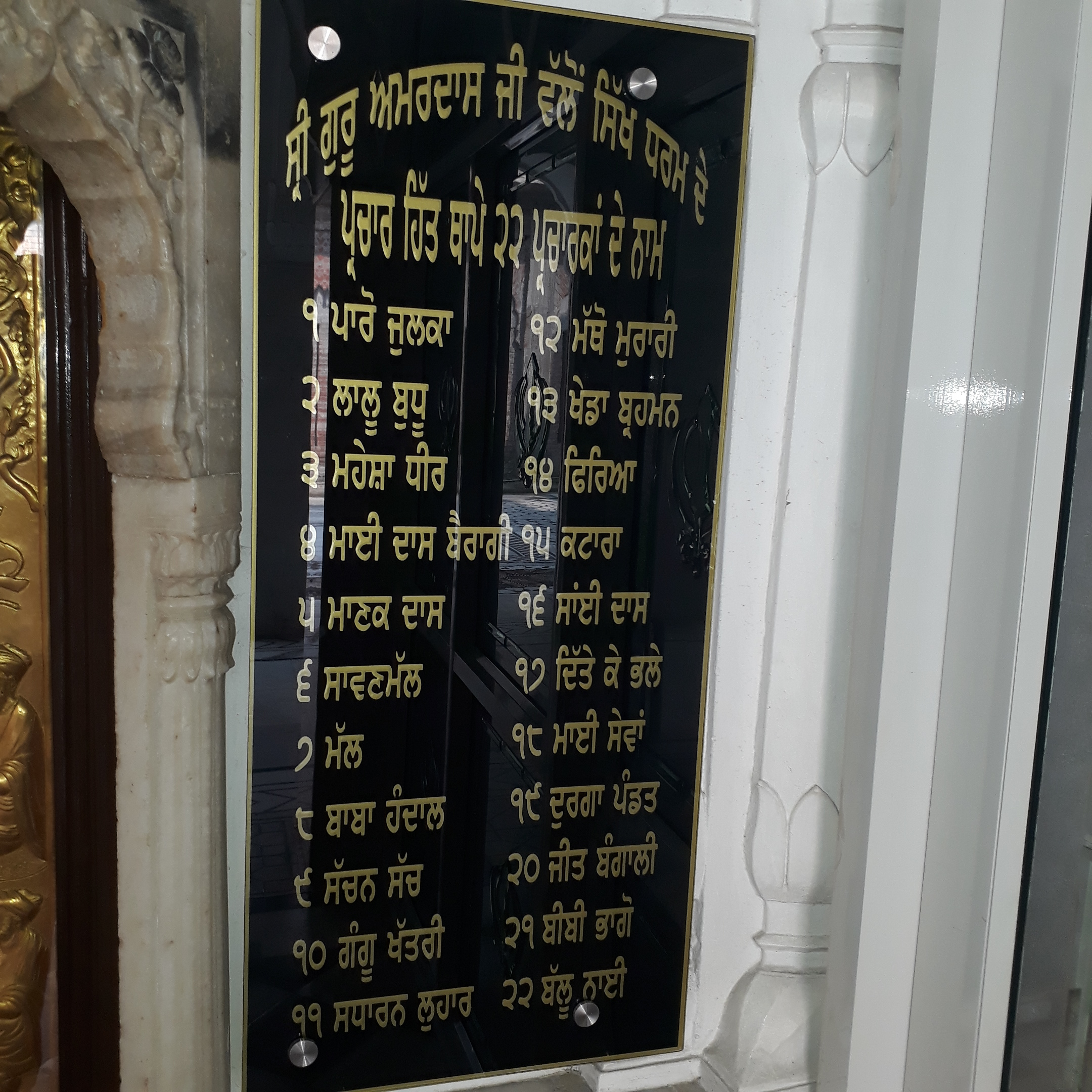
Gurmukhi wall plaque installed at Gurdwara Chaubara Sahib in Goindwal which lists the names of the 22 Manji administrators and preachers initially appointed by Guru Amar Das

Guru Amar Das divided the Sikh congregation areas into twenty-two Manji zones. He appointed a local preacher to be in-charge of each of the Manjis, known as a Manjidar. For this purpose, a large group of 146 followers were trained for the propagation of Sikhism. 94 of them were men whilst 52 were women. It had been conceptually similar in its aims to the diocese system in Christianity, and had been similarly important in Sikh missionary activity. It existed as a parallel system to the existing Mughal Empire and was modelled after the Mughal Empire's provincial zones, known as Subahs (of which there were also 22). Along with the Manjis, sub-centres known as Piris were established of which there were 52 in total.

== Purpose and role ==
The Manji system was established to give Sikhs a sense of their own sovereignty. This is reflected by the fact that the number of zones established perfectly mimics the Mughal administrative system's zones, with both having twenty-two primary divisions. The Manjis facilitated the spread of Sikhism to more faraway regions away from the already-established epicentres.

=== Manjidars ===
Manjidars were appointed leaders under the purview of the Guru and were responsible for a specified Manji diocese or parish. They were responsible for looking over the dharamsals and congregations of their assigned parish. The main dharamsals located at localities founded by a Sikh Guru or connected to their life were managed directly by a Sikh Guru whilst the centres in more minor, obscure, or distant localities and areas were headed by an appointed Manjidar. Positions of local Manjidars was not dynastic nor inheritable and it was not a professional duty as they still had to live the life of a householder. They were not allowed to claim divine status for themselves.

Manjidars should not be confused with the later Masands.

== List of manjidars ==
- Gangu Das, assigned by Guru Amar Das to preach in the Shivalik Hills region.

== See also ==
- Masand
- Piri system, a sub-system of the Sikh missionary system for women specifically
