= Kirat Karo =

One of the three pillars of Sikhism

Kirat Karō (Gurmukhi: ਕਿਰਤ ਕਰੋ) is one of the three pillars of Sikhism, the others being Naam Japo and Vaṇḍ chakkō. The term means to earn an honest, pure and dedicated living by exercising one's God-given skills, abilities, talents and hard labour for the benefit and improvement of the individual, their family and society at large. This means to work with determination and focus by the sweat of one's brow and not to be lazy and to waste one's life to time. Meanwhile, Simran and dedication to the work of God, not personal gain, should be one's main motivation.

== In scripture ==
In the Guru Granth Sahib, Guru Nanak Dev ji says:

"Those who have meditated on the Naam, the Name of the Lord, and departed after having worked by the sweat of their brows -O Nanak, their faces are radiant in the Court of the Lord, and many are saved along with them!"

Other relevant passages:

Deep within the hearts of His GurSikhs, the True Guru is pervading. The Guru is pleased with those who long for His Sikhs. As the True Guru directs them, they do their work and chant their prayers. The True Lord accepts the service of His GurSikhs.

Those who understand the Lord’s Court, never suffer separation from him. The True Guru has imparted this understanding. They practice truth, self-restraint and good deeds; their comings and goings are ended.

== See also ==
- Work ethic
- Self-actualization
