= Vand Chhako =

Sharing, one of the Three pillars of Sikhism

Vaṇḍ Chakō (Punjabi: ਵੰਡ ਛਕੋ) is one of the three main pillars of the teachings of Guru Nanak, the founder of the Sikhism. The other two pillars are Naam Japo and Kirat Karo. It means to share what you have and to consume it together as a community. This could be wealth, food. etc. The term is also used to mean to share ones wealth with others in the community, to give to charity, to distribute in Langar and to generally help others in the community who need help. A Sikh is expected to contribute a portion of their wealth or income to people in need or to a worthy cause.

An alternative spelling and meaning, "Vand Ke Chakna", means to share the fruits of one’s labor with others before considering oneself, thus living as an inspiration and a support to the entire community.

Guru Ji says in the Guru Granth Sahib, page 299:

"The twelfth day of the lunar cycle: Dedicate yourself to giving charity, chanting the Naam and purification. Worship the Lord with devotion, and get rid of your pride. Drink in the Ambrosial Nectar of the Lord's Name, in the Saadh Sangat, the Company of the Holy. The mind is satisfied by lovingly singing the Kirtan of God's Praises. The Sweet Words of His Bani soothe everyone. The soul, the subtle essence of the five elements, cherishes the Nectar of the Naam, the Name of the Lord. This faith is obtained from the Perfect Guru. O Nanak, dwelling upon the Lord, you shall not enter the womb of reincarnation again."

Guru Granth Sahib, page 718:

"I have enshrined the Lord's Feet within my heart. Contemplating my Lord and Master, my True Guru, all my affairs have been resolved. The merits of giving donations to charity and devotional worship come from the Kirtan of the Praises of the Transcendent Lord; this is the true essence of wisdom. Singing the Praises of the unapproachable, infinite Lord and Master, I have found immeasurable peace. The Supreme Lord God does not consider the merits and demerits of those humble beings whom He makes His own. Hearing, chanting and meditating on the jewel of the Naam, I live; Nanak wears the Lord as his necklace."

Bhai Gurdas Ji says in his Vaars, page 20:

"The Gurus of the Sikhs inspire the Sikhs of the Guru to serve. Serving the holy congregation they receive the fruit of happiness. Sweeping and spreading the sitting mats they bathe in the dust of the holy congregation. They bring unused pitchers and fill them with water. They bring sacred food and distribute it among others and eat."
