= Uppal (surname) =

Uppal (Hindi: उप्पल) is an Indian and Pakistani surname. It is also found as a clan name among the Khatris and Jats.

== Etymology ==
According to historian BN Puri, Uppal is derived from the Sanskrit term "utpalarana" which means "one who leaps upon their enemies". Puri further mentions it to be a part of the Bunjahi and Sareen subcaste of Khatris.

However, according to historian R. C. Dogra, Uppal means "stone", and the Uppal clan has origins in the districts of Montgomery, Amritsar and Ludhiana.

== Notables ==
- Chandeep Uppal (born 1988), British actress
- Deana Uppal (born 1989), British model, winner of Miss India UK 2012
- Dharam Singh Uppal (1959–2023), Indian international track and field athlete and Superintendent of Punjab Police
- Hari Uppal (1926–2011), Indian classical dancer
- Harpreet Uppal, British politician
- Param Uppal (born 1998), Australian cricketer
- Paul Uppal (born 1967), UK politician
- Priscila Uppal (1974–2018), Canadian author, poet and playwright
- Raman Uppal, Canadian-British economist and academic
- Sahil Uppal (born 1990), Indian actor
- Sangat Sahib (1640–1706), Punjabi saint of the Udasi sect
- Shiraz Uppal (born 1976), Pakistani singer and songwriter
- Stephen Uppal (born 1978), British-Indian actor
- Tim Uppal (born 1974), Canadian politician, banker, and radio host
- Vikas Uppal (1986–2007), India's all time tallest man
- Vishal Uppal (born 1976), Indian tennis player

== See also ==
- Uppal Khalsa, Jalandhar
- Uppal Jagir, Jalandhar
