= Bhai Goinda =

Udasi preacher and one of the four Adi-Udasis active in the 17th century

Bhai Goinda (27 July 1569 – 15 September 1649) was an Udasi preacher and one of the four Adi-Udasis active in the 17th century. (Note: His name is alternatively spelt/rendered as 'Goind', 'Gonda', 'Gobind', 'Gobinda', 'Govinda'.) After being elevated by Baba Gurditta to his own dhuni (hearth), he had a missionary centre active in the Doaba region of Punjab.

== Biography ==
Goinda was born on 27 July 1569 to a Khatri family of Srinagar to parents Jai Dev and Mai Subhadra. Goinda, seeking spiritual enlightenment, became influenced by a Nanakshahi sadhu, so he travelled to Kartarpur and became a disciple of Guru Arjan in 1596. He had a younger brother named Phula, whom he convinced to also become a Sikh, which he did in 1604 at Amritsar. Goinda later became an associate of Baba Gurditta, who appointed Goinda to become a head preacher of the Udasi sect on 11 September 1637. Goinda established his missionary seat at Kiratpur, later he shifted to Phillaur, both being in Punjab, with the Doaba region being the area where he conducted his preaching activities. Goinda died at Phillaur on 15 September 1649. A samadh was erected there dedicated to him. His missionary seat went into decline after his death.
