= Sri Chand Darbar =

- Location within Sindh Location within Pakistan

Religion
- Affiliation: Hinduism
- District: Thatta
- Deity: Sri Chand

Location
- State: Sindh
- Country: Pakistan
- Interactive map of Sri Chand Darbar
- Coordinates: 24°44′53.88″N 67°57′49.68″E

Sri Chand Darbar or Baba Sri Chandar Temple is a 500 year old religious shrine dedicated to the Sri Chand, founder of Udasi sect and elder son of Guru Nanak. It is located in Faqir Jo Goth near Thatta city

The annual urs festival is the main festival of the shrine. It is attended by Hindus all over the Sindh and by local Muslims.

== History ==
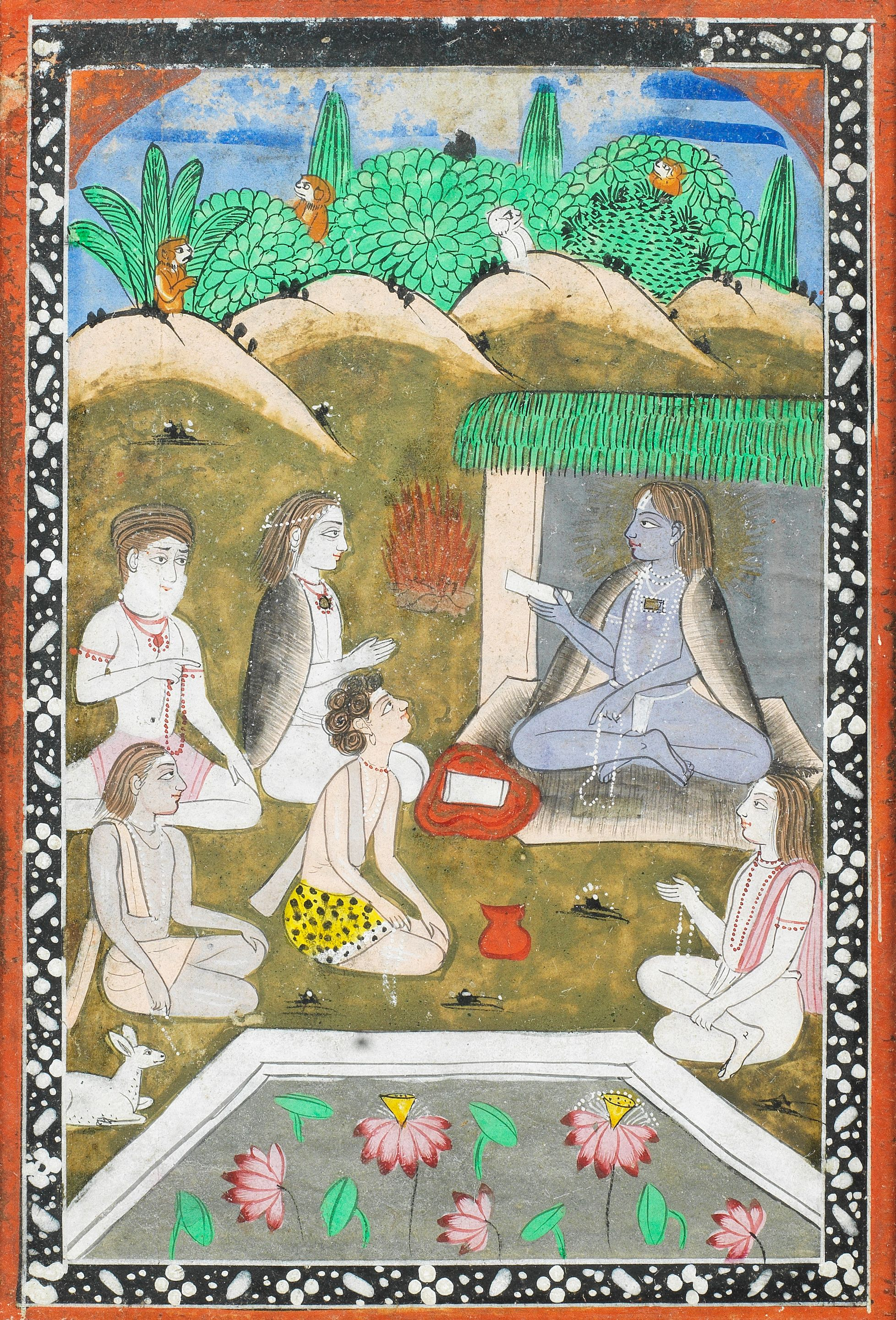
Sri Chand, son of Guru Nanak, seated reading scriptures to devotees in a forest hermitage

Sri Chand travelled to Sindh in the second half of the 16th century during the reign of the Tarkhan dynasty and lighted dhuni at Faqir Jo Goth. At that time, Thatta was under the rule of Mirza Baqi Baig, Tarkhan ruler of Sindh (1554–1591), who was infamous for his oppressive and tyrannical reign. Baba Siri Chandar bravely spoke out against the atrocities committed by Mirza Baqi. The shrine was built at the place of dhuni to commemorate Sri Chand's visit.

The shrine was also visited by Baba Bankhandi. After spending some time here before moving to Sadh Belo, which became his permanent abode, and where he spread the thought and ideology of Baba Srichand.

== Architecture and composition ==
The temple's stone architecture, features approximately 24 living quarters, a vast dining hall known as Bandharo, and expansive prayer rooms housing the idols. It was built 500 years ago on a sprawling two-acre site.

In the courtyard, a 50-foot wooden flag adorned with colorful cloth, known as Jhando Sahib, was raised. Each year, on the 22nd day of Bhadun in the Hindi calendar, the Jhando Sahib was taken down and reinstalled by a Muslim family from Aamu Mallah.

The shrine houses Granth Sahib, Bhagvad Gita, icons of all Sikh Gurus and portraits of Hindu deities. Within the temple, there resides a 6-foot statue of Kanwar Bhagat, a revered mystic singer from Sindh. Tragically, he was assassinated during the pre-Partition violence while aboard a train near Ruk railway station, close to Sukkur.

== See also ==
- Hinglaj Mata mandir
