= Uppal =

Uppal may refer to:

== Places ==
- Uppal Kalan, a suburb of Hyderabad, India
  - Uppal metro station
- Uppal Jagir, Jalandhar, Punjab, India
- Uppal railway station, Hanamkonda, Telangana, India

== People ==
- Uppal (surname)

== See also ==
- Upal, a town in Xinjiang, China
- Uppala, a town in Kerala, India
