= Sangat Sahib =

Udasi preacher

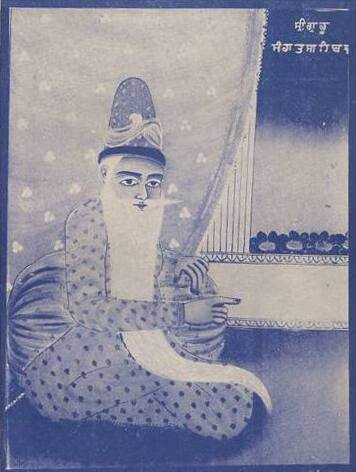
Painting of Sangat Sahib, an Udasi leader, published in the 'Mahatma' Amritsar, Sri Chand Ank (September 1953)

Sangat Sahib (1640 – 1706), also spelt as Sangata Sahib, also known as Bhai Pheru, was an Udasi leader and the founder of one of the six main Bakhshishan sub-sects of the Udasis. His followers are known as Sangat Sahibias, Sangat Sahibie or Sangat Sahie. He served as a masand of the Nikka Desh region from the period of Guru Har Rai to Guru Gobind Singh, being based out of Mian Ke Maur. He is also known as Sangat Pheru and Satyasmaaru.

== Biography ==
Sangat Sahib was born in 1660 in a Uppal Khatri family of Amba Mari village (also spelt Aanbwaari) near Lahore in the Lamma area Punjab to father Binna Uppal. He spent his youth selling ghee in different places. Eventually, he became acquainted with Guru Har Rai after being introduced to him by Bhai Bhagtu when the guru was conducting a missionary tour of the Malwa region, there-after he became a Sikh. Piara Singh Padam claims Pheru met the guru at Kiratpur. Sangat began volunteering in the langar and became a hawker. Sangat was praised by the guru after he gave free ghee for the operation of the langar when he was informed that the supplies ran-out by Bhai Bhagtu, he also provided free ghee for the agricultural labourers in Kiratpur. The guru renamed Sangat Sahib as Bhai Pheru (meaning "divine wanderer"), deriving from his occupation as a hawker (known as a pheriwala). Piara Singh Padam claims he earned the Pheru nickname much earlier in his life. Sangat later became blind in one eye.

The guru assigned him to missionary work (a missionary assignment was known as a Bakhshīsh) in the Nakka and Lamma areas of Punjab, also bestowing Sangat with a pothi (hymn-book), mala (rosary), a majithi robe, and the ability to initiate others into the Sikh faith as the guru's representative. Sangat established a langar at each place he preached at but established his base of operations (dera) in Mian Ke Maur in Lahore district. Shortly before the officialization of the Khalsa, Guru Gobind Singh was investigating the conduct of the masands due to some of them being corrupted and immoral, he found Sangat Sahib to be of good-conduct, thus he awarded him with the Sahib honourifical suffix and with the appellation Sachi-Darhi ("immaculately truthful beard"). Guru Gobind Singh also gifted Pheru with half of his turban, who wrapped it around his cap. Furthermore, Pheru was exempted from having to join the Khalsa order by the guru, with Pheru returning to his preaching-centre where his sub-sect sprung-up.

Sangat Sahib lived to an old age and died in 1706. His remains were cremated at Chunia village near Lahore. The sub-sect of Sangat Sahib, the Sangat Sahib Ke, was one of the two most popular of the Bakhshishan sub-sects, alongside the sub-sect of Bhagat Bhagwan. His sub-sect pays reverence towards ash, specifically balls of ash (gole di puja). Followers of his order would later found the Udasin Panchayati Naya Akhara in 1839. Sangat Sahib had forty disciples, some of them were Baba Brindavana and Baba Narayana Dasa. One of Sangat's disciples was Mahant Narain Das of Dera-i Khurd in Kasur. The location where Sangat had his centre (near Mian Ke Maur in the Nakka region) became known as Bhai Pheru, now Phool Nagar.
