= Udasin Panchayati Bada Akhara =

Religious organization

- Formation: 1825
- Founder: Yogiraj Shree Nirvandev Maharaj
- Founded at: Har Ki Pauri, Haridwar
- Headquarters: 58/46, Kydganj Rd, Krishna Nagar, Kydganj, Prayagraj, Uttar Pradesh 211003, India
- President: Mahant Maheshwar Das Maharaj
- Council: Mahant Raghu Muni Maharaj, Mahant Durga Das Maharaj, and Mahant Advaitanand Maharaj
- Parent organization: Akhil Bharatiya Akhara Parishad
- Website: udasinpanchayatibadaakhara.com

The Udasin Panchayati Bada Akhara or Panchayati Bara Udasin Akhara is one of two Udasi akharas that participate in the Kumbh. They are Sanatan Sikhs. The group advocates the promotion of traditional Indian culture and religion. The word bada means "large".

== History ==
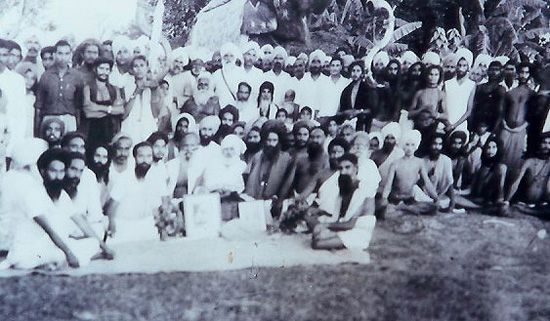
Photograph of Udasis of the Vada Akhara, circa early 20th century

A panchaiti akhara to act as the main organ of the Udasis had been founded in 1779 at Prayag (Allahabad), with branches based out of Kashi (Varanasi) and Kankhal. In the early 19th century, the Udasi tradition was in a state of decline, thus the akhara was founded to counter-act this trend. This specific akhara was founded on the Basant Panchami of 1825 at the Har Ki Pauri of Haridwar by Yogiraj Shree Nirvandev Maharaj. However, Mahant Durga Das claims that the Udasi sant Santokh Das founded the akhara. In 1846, Mahant Sudhir Das broke away from the bada akhara due to an internal dispute and founded the Udasin Panchayati Naya Akhara. Despite being founded at Haridwar, the main ashram of the bada akhara is now based out of Krishnanagar, Prayag (Allahabad). During the Indian independence movement, the akhara trained independence fighters, especially the Sultanpur Ashram of the akhara and during the Kumbhs that were held in the 1920s–1930s.

== Beliefs and practices ==
The organization venerates Sri Chand, elder son of Guru Nanak, the four sons of Brahma, Ganesh, Lakshmi, Vishnu, Shiva, Bhagwati, and Suryanarayan. They use the term Guru Chandradev to refer to Sri Chand. They venerate Sri Chand in a manner akin to Shaivist worship. They affirm that Vishnu's Treta Yuga incarnation was Rama and his Dwapar Yuga incarnation was Krishna. Sri Chand (whom they called Chandra Dev) is believed by them to be the 165th Acharya of the Udasin sect. They believe Sri Chand was Shiva's incarnation due to a request by Narayana.

The group installs a 75-foot flag on the occasion of Kumbh and Mahakumbh melas. Due to mainstream Sikhs opposing their syncretic practices and beliefs, they have heightened security at their camps. While the Nirmala akhara is more Sikh-aligned, the Udasi akhara is more aligned with a syncretism of Sikhism and Hinduism. However, they also recite gurbani. They fly a red flag, featuring an ensign of Hanuman on one side and a chakra on the other. They hold ash in high-regard due to a belief connecting Pritam Das and Baba Bankhandi.

The group follows the guru-shishya tradition. To become a naga-sadhu associated with the group, it is required to be between 12 and 24 years old. They must shave their head upon initiation (not required for women and girls) and adorn themselves with earrings, a waistcloth, a necklace, and anklets. Furthermore, they swear a lifetime vow to the akhara and nation on their religious flag and their ishtdeva. They are against caste divisions.

== Structure ==
The akhara is governed by a Shree Panch, which is a council of five senior seers, with Sri Chand believed to be the council's witness. The 2019 council consisted of Shree Mahant Maheshwar Das, Shree Mahant Raghumuni, Shree Mahant Durgadas and Shree Mahant Advaitanand. In 2025, it was reported that the council consisted of four members, with Mahant Maheshwar Das Maharaj as the president and the council consisting of Mahant Raghu Muni Maharaj, Mahant Durga Das Maharaj, and Mahant Advaitanand Maharaj. Each mahant headed one of the four directions.

The akhara has affiliate branches across India, such as in the states of Uttar Pradesh, Uttarakhand, Bihar, Haryana, Punjab, Madhya Pradesh, Maharashtra, Andhra Pradesh, Gujarat, and Telangana. Furthermore, they operate schools, colleges, and hospitals, and social service camps. Their educational institutions often specialize in Sanskrit. There are at-least a hundred ashrams across India affiliated with the akhara.
