= Ganga Ram Viakarni =

Mahant Ganga Ram Viakarni
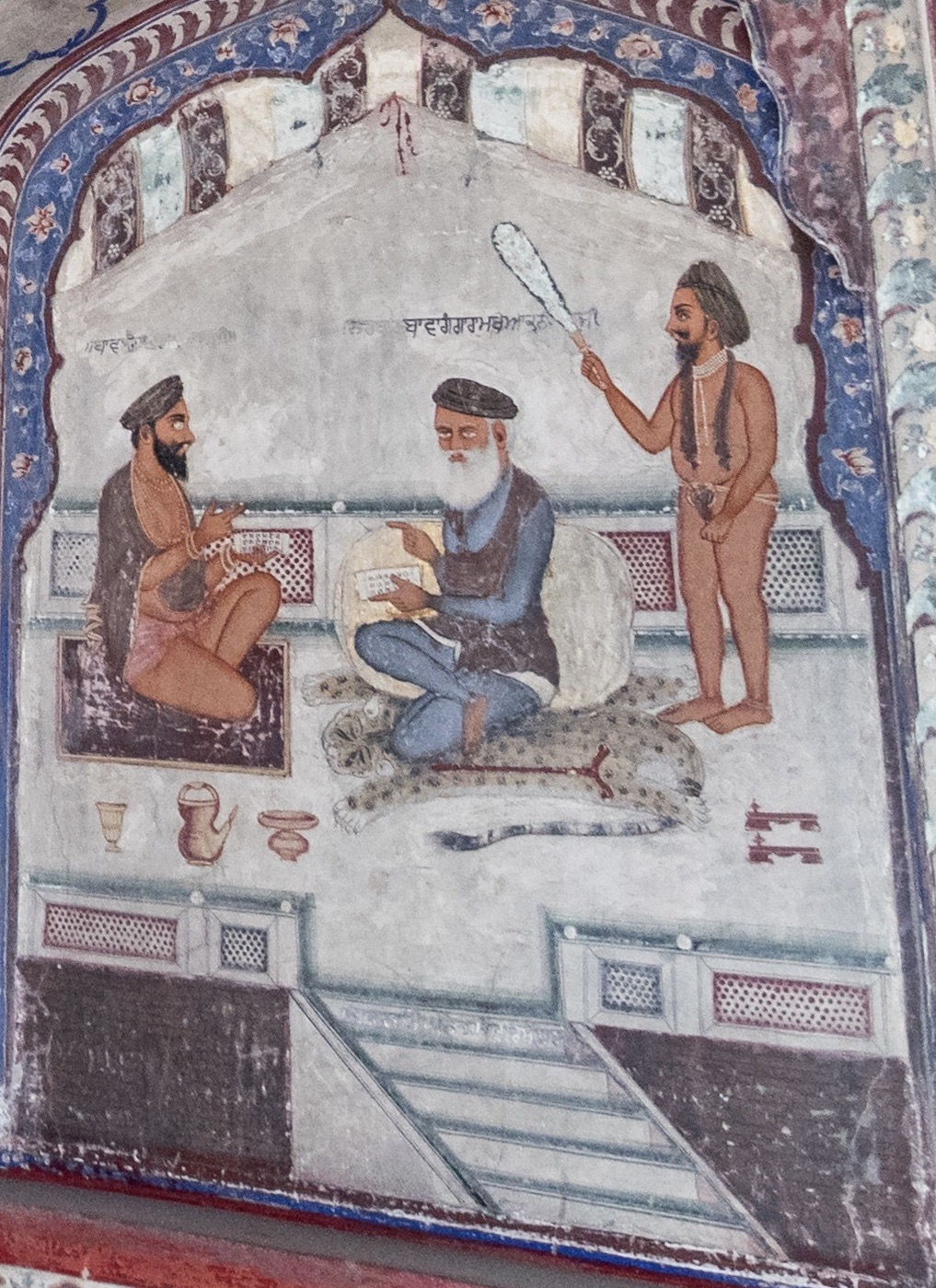
- Fresco from the Udasi Chitta Akhara in Amritsar depicting Ganga Ram Viakarni (centre) with a disciple (left) and a fly-whisk attendant (chaur sahib; right)

Personal life
- Known for: Founder of the Chitta Akhara

Religious life
- Religion: Sikhism
- Sect: Udasi

Ganga Ram Viakarni (fl. 18th century), also known as Ganga Das Viakarni, was an 18th-century Udasi mahant who founded the Chitta Akhara (also known as 'Akhara Ganga Ram' after its founder), an akhara located in the Mai Sawan Bazar neighbourhood of Amritsar.

== Biography ==
Ganga Ram was an expert of Sanskrit and Gurmukhi syntax. The misldars (chieftains) of the Sikh Confederacy in his time granted him permission to operate a langar kitchen near the Harmandir Sahib complex. He founded the Chitta Akhara in the year 1789. Another source states he founded the akhara earlier in 1781.

== Legacy ==
His akhara still functions to this day, it contains historical fresco artwork depicting Sikh themes. The akhara also contains ancient tombs. His akhara is part of the route of the Amritsar Heritage Walk tour.

=== Successive mahants ===
- Lachhman Das (circa 1923)
- Sohan Das
- Bachan Das
- Damodar Das
