= Bhai Phula Shah =

Udasi preacher

Bhai Phula Shah (14 February 1574 – 17 May 1663), also known as Puspa Deva, was an Udasi leader and one of the four Adi-Udasis whom were active in the 17th century. (Note: His name is also spelt/rendered as 'Bhai Phul', 'Puṣpa Deva', 'Phul Shah') He founded one of the four dhunis (hearths) of the Udasis after the period of Sri Chand and Baba Gurditta, with his being based out of Hoshiarpur.

== Biography ==
Phula was from Srinagar and was born on 14 February 1574 to a Khatri family to parents Jai Dev and Mai Subhadra. Phul had an elder brother named Goinda, whom was also one of the four Adi-Udasis. Due to advice given to him by his elder brother, Phula became a Sikh at Amritsar on 20 March 1604. He adopted the ochre-coloured clothing associated with Udasis at Kiratpur on 21 January 1637. Phula was appointed to one of the four new missionary centres of the Udasis by Baba Gurditta on 12 September 1637, with his missionary seat being placed at Hoshiarpur in Punjab. After this, Phula conducted missionary work in Punjab for a bit but later began travelling around India, visiting pilgrimage sites. Eventually Phula returned to Punjab in 17 January 1651 took-up residence at Bahadurpur (now in Hoshiarpur). Phula died in Bahadurpur on 17 May 1663. The successors of Phula's dhuni would later conduct missionary activities in central India, setting up a centre at Chikhli, Masharashtra.
