= Anandghan (Udasi) =

Udasi writer

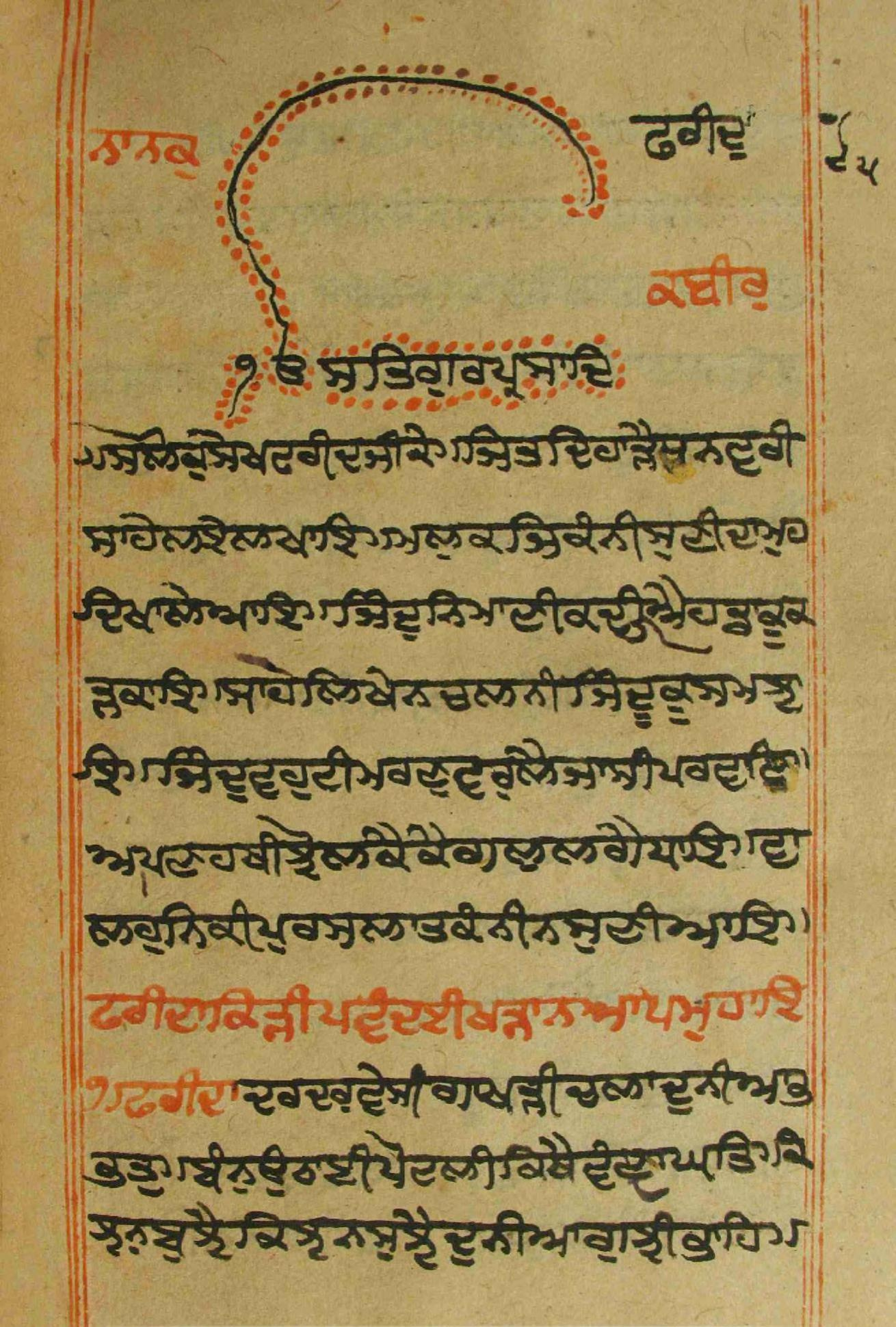
Decorated folio of a manuscript of the Japji Sahib Teeka of Anandghan Udasi

Anandghan, also rendered as Anand Ghan, was an Udasi writer active in the late 18th and early 19th century who authored Vedantic-influenced commentaries on the Guru Granth Sahib. His works are described as being the most representative example of the Udasi exegesis of gurbani. Anandghan believed Sri Chand was the true successor of Guru Nanak and an incarnation of God. Anandghan was at one point the teacher of Santokh Singh. In 1795, Anandghan authored a commentary on the Japji Sahib composition that aligned with the dharmaśastras and claimed that Guru Nanak acknowledged the Indic deities' power. Anandghan's commentaries have been criticized as inaccurate and misleading, especially by his former disciple Santokh Singh. Santokh Singh's Garab Ganjani Teeka was written to counter Anandghan's claim that Guru Nanak recognized six gurus in his Japji composition and Anandghan's esoteric interpretation of gurbani. In 1970, the teeka of Anandghan was published by the Languages Department of the Punjab government.
