= Udasi =

Early sect of Sikhism

Udasipanth ਉਦਾਸੀਪੰਥ
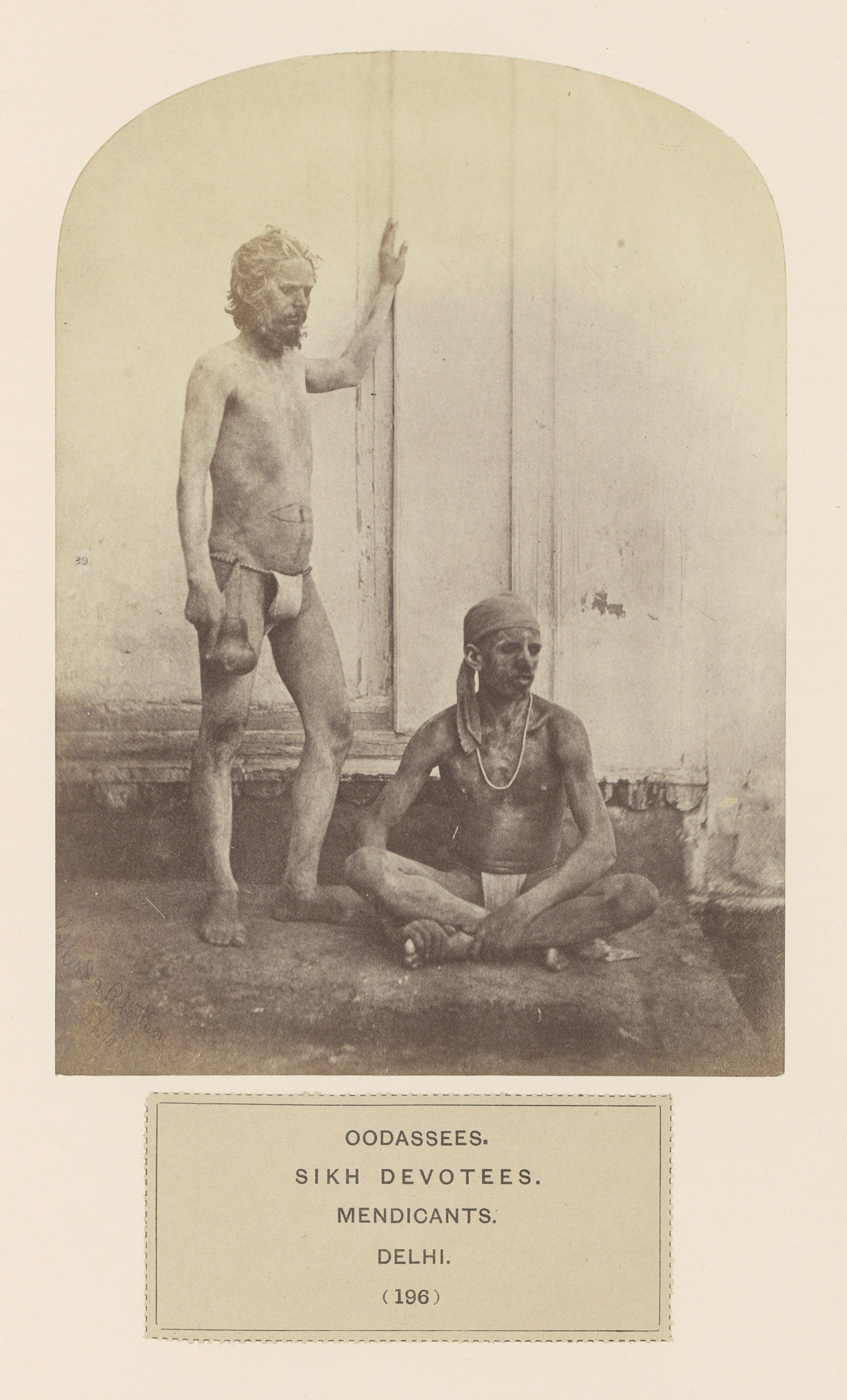
- Portrait of two Udasi mendicants of Sikhism in Delhi, Shepherd & Robertson (possibly), ca.1859–69

Founder
- Sri Chand

Regions with significant populations
- Throughout the Indian subcontinent, such as Punjab • Sindh • Uttarakhand • Uttar Pradesh • Orissa • Nepal

Religions
- Syncretism of Hinduism • Sikhism

Scriptures
- Matras • Guru Granth Sahib • Hindu scriptures

Udasis (Gurmukhi: ਉਦਾਸੀ ਸੰਪਰਦਾ; udāsī saparadā) (Devanagari: उदासी संप्रदाय), also spelt as Udasins, also known as Nanak Putras (meaning "sons of Nanak"), are a religious sect of ascetic sadhus centred in northern India who follow a tradition known as Udasipanth. The Udasis are a type of Sehajdhari or Sanatan Sikh, rather than orthodox Khalsa Sikhs. Similar Sikh sects to the Udasis include the Nirmalas and Sewapanthis. They were historically one of the first missionary traditions of Sikhism.

Becoming custodians of Sikh shrines in the 18th century, they were notable interpreters and spreaders of the Sikh philosophy during that time. They alongside the Nirmalas were responsible for the spreading of Sanatan Sikhism during the 19th century and were a key component in the indigenous, pre-colonial education system. However, their religious practices border on a syncretism of Sikhism and Hinduism, and they did not conform to the Khalsa standards as ordained by Guru Gobind Singh. When the Lahore Singh Sabha reformers, dominated by Tat Khalsa Sikhs, would hold them responsible for indulging in ritual practices antithetical to Sikhism, as well as personal vices and corruption, the Udasi mahants were expelled from the Sikh shrines.

== Etymology ==
Udasi and Udasin is derived from the Sanskrit word Udāsīn, which means one who is indifferent to or disregardful of worldly attachments, a stoic, or a mendicant. The word Udasi is derived from the Sanskrit word udasin, meaning 'detached, journey', reflecting an approach to spiritual and temporal life, or from udas ('detachment'), signifying indifference to or renunciation of worldly concerns. The word udas, meaning renunciation, came to be applied as a general label for the renunciates, the Udasis. According to Satish K. Kapoor, the term derives from the words āsina ("sits") and ut ("above"), becoming udāsīna, as the Udasis are said to be above the material world and senses. The term udasi is also used to describe the four travel-tours of Guru Nanak.

== History ==
=== Origin ===
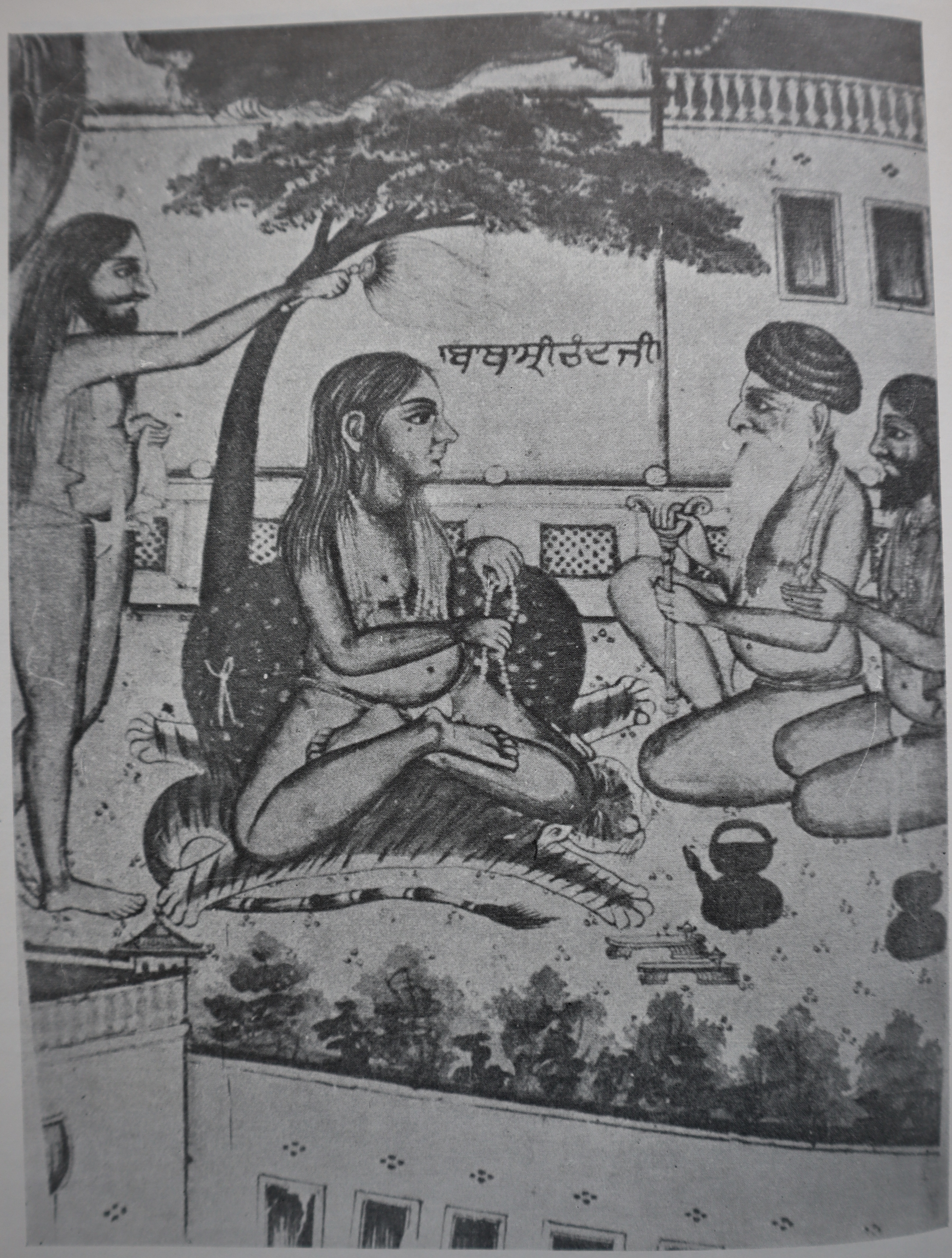
Fresco of Sri Chand from Akhara Bala-Nand, Amritsar

According to their traditional origin narrative, the sect was established in the Puranic age, tracing back to the four Kumaras who were bestowed with divine knowledge (divya jnana) by Vishnu, with them considering Sri Chand (whom they refer to as Sri Candracarya) as being the 165th spiritual master in their lineage. Udasis believe that Sri Chand received enlightenment from his father Guru Nanak before he began his own spiritual career.

Historically speaking, the sect was founded by and based on the teachings of Guru Nanak's elder son Sri Chand (1494–1629, other sources give a death year of 1643). Sri Chand, contrary to his father's emphasis on participation in society, propagated ascetic renunciation and celibacy. Another Sikh tradition links the Udasis to Baba Gurditta, the eldest son of Guru Hargobind, and there is dispute on whether the Udasis originated with Sri Chand or Gurditta. A third and common viewpoint is that Sri Chand was the founder of the sect and passed the leadership to Baba Gurditta as his successor.

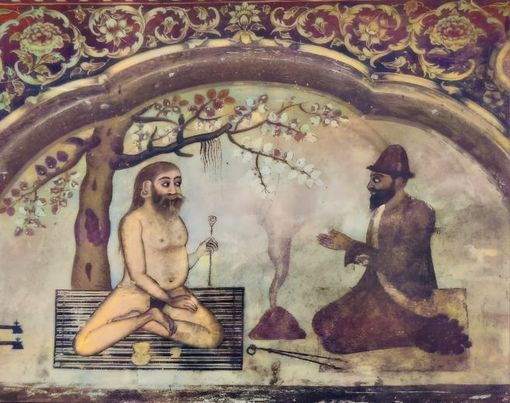
Fresco depicting Sri Chand with Baba Gurditta

Sri Chand had a traditional upbringing. He underwent the yajnopavīta ceremony, studied at a gurukul, and spent time alone in wilderness in a state of meditation. While his father was out on tours, Sri Chand was spiritually training himself in yoga, asceticism, celibacy, and inner control in-order to become worthy of being his father's spiritual successor. However, his father Nanak passed over him in-favour of his follower Bhai Lehna, who became the next guru, Guru Angad. The new Sikh guru shifted to Khadur whilst Sri Chand and his brother held possession of Kartarpur, where Nanak had spent his later years. But Sri Chand, disheartened due to the fact he was passed over for the succession to the guruship in favour of a comparatively more recent devotee of his father, lost interest in worldly affairs and left the management of Kartarpur to his brother, Lakhmi Das. Instead, in 1538 Sri Chand began meditating at the samadhi that he constructed dedicated to his father and began only wearing a loin-cloth. In 1548, Sri Chand moved to Bath village near Pathankot where he would live for the rest of his life. Sri began teaching his own interpretation of his father's philosophy. Sri Chand incorporated his father's concept of Sangat and Langar to create an environment to spiritually improve both individuals and society. A key difference lay in lifestyle, where Sri Chand advocated renunciation whilst the mainstream Sikhs were house-holders who had families.

Nanak had worn the dress (bhekh) of ascetics and went on long tours, but he abandoned the robes of an ascetic and adopted the dress of the common-folk after he settled down at Kartarpur. Hymns authored by Nanak show that an ideal Sikh becomes like an ascetic (Udasi) despite being engaged in the world as the divine is present everywhere and in everything. Despite the teachings and lived example of his father, Sri Chand rejected living amongst the world, preferring instead total renunciation, not the mental renunciation that his father had taught while living a house-holders life. Sri Chand is claimed to have conducted distant tours of the Indian subcontinent and beyond, similar to his father. Lore also connects Sri Chand to performing miracle feats. Furthermore, Sri Chand introduced the practice of simultaneous worship of five Indic deities (Ganesha, Surya, Vishnu, Shiva, & Shakti), a concept known as pancadevopasana, perhaps to lower the divides present within the Hindu community to slow the trend of Hindus becoming Muslims.

Sri Chand kept friendly ties with the successive Sikh gurus, his father's successors. Sri Chand's conduct and lineage afforded him respect in the Sikh community at the time, despite differences in viewpoints. Despite this, Nanak's immediate successors, namely Angad, Amar Das, and Ram Das, made certain to state that renunciation was not in-line with Sikh orthopraxy. Guru Amar Das wrote a composition known as Sakhi Guru Amar Das Ki Mehle 3 warning Sikhs against becoming renunciates. In 1629, Sri Chand asked Guru Hargobind to let him one of his children join him in his religious activities, who was decided to be Baba Gurditta. Sri Chand would adopt Baba Gurditta as his spiritual successor, despite Gurditta not being a renunciate. Whilst the Bhatt Bahis assert that Sri Chand died in 1629, Udasis believed he disappeared after giving a final sermon to a Bhutanese disciple named Brahmaketu. Anand Ghan, an Udasi scholar, believed Sri Chand to be the true successor of Guru Nanak.

=== Spread of the sect ===
The Udasis first came to prominence in the 17th century, and gradually began to manage Sikh shrines and establishments in the 18th century, from where they espoused a model of Sikhism that diverged considerably from that of the Khalsa. According to Harjot Singh Oberoi, the Udasis (especially its monastic orders and their sub-branches, consisting of wandering ascetics and mendicants) were critical for spreading Sikhism in the areas peripheral to and outside of the core Sikh homeland and bases in central Punjab, consisting of liminal zones, by acting as cultural mediators of Sikhism. They accomplished this by promoting a form of the religion known as Sanatan Sikhism, which accommodated Hindu beliefs and practice. They were able to introduce Sikh philosophy to Hindus in these zones. They preached at popular places of pilgrimage and festivals, teaching about renunciation and salvation. Thus, Oberoi credits the Udasis and the Nirmalas for spreading Sikhism across geographical frontiers and cultural barriers, in areas that may have been neutral or hostile to normative, heterodox Sikhism. Gradually, these peripheral zones had a monastic centre established within them, which consolidated their gradual entry into the Sikh sphere of influence. Furthermore, the Udasi establishments played a critical role in the pre-colonial indigenous education system. Individual Udasis were skilled as historians, authors, exagetes, teachers, trascribers, translators, and as traditional doctors (especially in ayurveda).

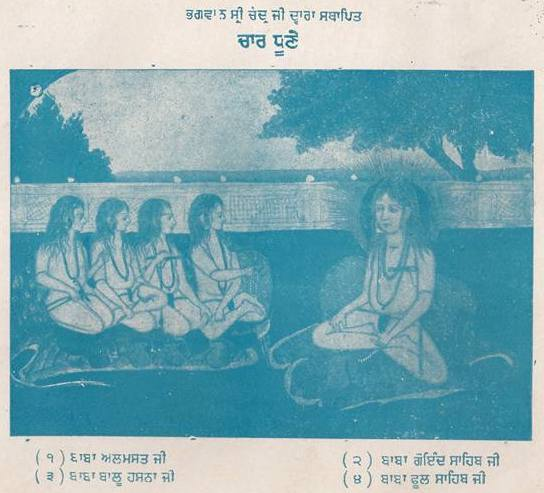
Painting of Sri Chand with the four Adi-Udasins (Phula Shah, Gonda, Baba Hamsa, and Al-mast)

After Sri Chand, four hearths (known as dhuāns or dhunās) were established at Hoshiarpur, Kiratpur, Kartarpur, and Nanakmatta respectively to continue his teachings. Baba Gurditta is believed to have set-up the four-hearth system after succeeding Sri Chand as the religious leader. The four heads of each of these monastic-orders were Al-mast, Baba Hamsa, Gonda, and Phula Shah. This system was adopted sometime in the first half of the 17th century and these four preachers became known as the Adi-Udasis. All four of the Adi-Udasis were originally from Srinagar in Kashmir. Also, they were two pairs of brothers. Bhai Almast was the elder brother of Bhai Balu Hasna. Bhai Govinda (elder brother) was appointed on 11 September 1637 and Bhai Phul (younger brother) was appointed the next day on 12 September 1637. Gurditta made the four preachers adopt his dress, which would become charactistic of the Udasis. He also made them take an ember from Sri Chand's hearth to their new place of establishment to set-up their own hearths. These four centres of the Udasis were named after their head-missionary. Each of the four dhuans had their own active area of preaching, namely (1) eastern India (base at Nanakmata), (2) western Panjab and Kashmir, (3) Malwa, and (4) Doaba. Almast conducted missionary work in eastern India, such as at Puri, at Nanakmatta in Uttarakhand, and in Sindh. Balu Hasna evangelized in Kartarpur, Pothohar, and Peshawar. Govinda preached in the Doaba region while Phul conducted his missionary work in Hoshiarpur. Govinda's dhuni disappeared after his death. Followers of Phul would later preach in central India, in what is now Maharashtra.

The Udasis propagated across the subcontinent and re-discovered places related to Sikh history that had been forgotten and abandoned. Over-time, six ascetical orders of the Udasis propped-up, known as the Bakśiśa or Bakhshishāṅ (meaning "bounty"), which were prevalent during the mid-to-late 17th and early 18th century during the period of Guru Har Rai to Guru Gobind Singh. Many of the prime figures of these Bakhshishan sects were originally masands serving the Sikh gurus, who conferred upon them a preaching mission, known as a Bakhshish. These six ascetical sub-sects were headed by Bhakta Bhagawana, Ajita Mal, Suthare Shah, Mihaan Sahib, Bakht Mal, and Sangata Sahib. The most successful of these six sub-sects were the ones associated with Bhakta Bhagawana and Sangata Sahib. There were also other, lesser-known Bakhshishan sub-sects aside from the six main ones, with some of the more obscure and esoteric ones being traced to the Minas. These sub-sects further founded Udasi sites, such as deras, sangats, maths, and akharas, in various places in the subcontinent. The Udasis reached proximal and distant areas away from the Punjab. Some of the regions they are known to have been active in include numerous areas of Punjab but also Kabul, Dhaka, Gorakh Mata, Jagannath Puri, Rameswaram, Prayag, and Haridwar. An inscription linked to the Udasis has also been discovered at a Zoroastrian temple in Azerbaijan, the Ateshgah of Baku.

The Udasis widely propagated its form of Sikh philosophy, and during the 18th and early-19th centuries, their teachings attracted a large number of people to the Sikh fold. The Udasis did not receive much official patronage from the Sikh gurus during the period of Sri Chand but they began to receive support and recognition after Baba Gurditta onwards, with some Udasi sadhus being given missionary assignments by the Sikh gurus, with these missionary assignments being known as a bakhshish. Some Udasis specifically served the Sikh gurus, such as Bhai Pheru serving Guru Har Rai's langar, Ramdev/Mihan Sahib who served as a water-carrier for Guru Tegh Bahadur, and Kirpal Das, who assisted Guru Gobind Singh in the Battle of Bhangani (1688). A member of the sub-sect of Balu Husna named Udho Das also served Punjab Kaur, whom was the widow of Ram Rai.

According to early Gurbilas literature and some modern scholars, Guru Gobind Singh had employed a large number of armed, militant Udasi asectics prior to the construction of the forts of Anandpur Sahib. It has been posited that Guru Gobind Singh initiated the Khalsa in order to amalgamate the nirgun bhakti beliefs of the Ramanandis and the martial traditions of the growing number of armed mahants. When Guru Gobind Singh ended the masand system, Udasis became paramount for their missionary activities, which had previously also been conducted by the masands. The Udasis also began to take control of Sikh sites after this reform. After the Sikhs evacuated from Anandpur Sahib, the caretaking of the Sis Ganj and Kesgarh Sahib shrines became the responsibility of an Udasi named Gurbaksh Das, who also helped quell a pretender to the guruship by Gulab Rai in Anandpur after the Sikh guru's death. Some Udasis are also said to have travelled with Guru Gobind Singh on his southward journey to the Deccan. One of them, Bhai Lal Das, underwent the Khalsa baptism and was re-named Prehlad Singh, later authoring one of the 18th century rehitnamas (code of conduct) of the Sikhs. An Udasi named Ishar Das also managed the main shrine at Nanded, after Guru Gobind Singh died. In 1711, Bhai Mani Singh appointed the Udasi figure Gopal Das (also known as Goddar Faquir) as granthi of Sri Darbar Sahib in Amritsar. Gopal Das had originally been sent there by Mata Sundari, widow of Guru Gobind Singh.

However, despite their affinities and close-relationship to Sikhism, the Udasis also maintained an independent identity. The Udasi did not experience the anti-Sikh persecutions of the 18th century, unlike Khalsa Sikhs. This was due to the Udasis not having the typical appearance of a Khalsa Sikh, so the ruling, anti-Sikh governments by both the Mughal and Afghan administrations did not target them and they were spared from the massacres. However, some of the Udasis still felt unsafe and left Punjab during this time and moved elsewhere in the subcontinent and beyond, especially at Prayag, Haridwar, and Nanaknatta. According to Surjit Singh Gandhi, this was the reason that the Udasis began to incorporate more Hindu-aligned or affiliated beliefs and practices from the 18th century onward, due to being distant from the Sikh homeland in the Punjab and being influenced by their new neighbours, whom were majority Hindus. Due to Khalsa Sikhs being openly persecuted from 1710–1765, the Udasis were able to gain control over vacated Sikh sites. The Khalsa Sikhs became more occupied with martial pursuits, therefore the Udasis took over much of the missionary and scholarly activities of the Sikh community. Banda Singh Bahadur's rebellion was crushed in 1716 and the Khalsa underwent government-sponsored campaigns to root them out.

Even prior to Sikh-rule, some Udasi institutions received madad-i ma'ash land grants from the ruling administration. The Mughals and Afghan chieftains of Kasur had bestowed revenue-free grants on around six Udasi institutions.

=== During Sikh-rule ===
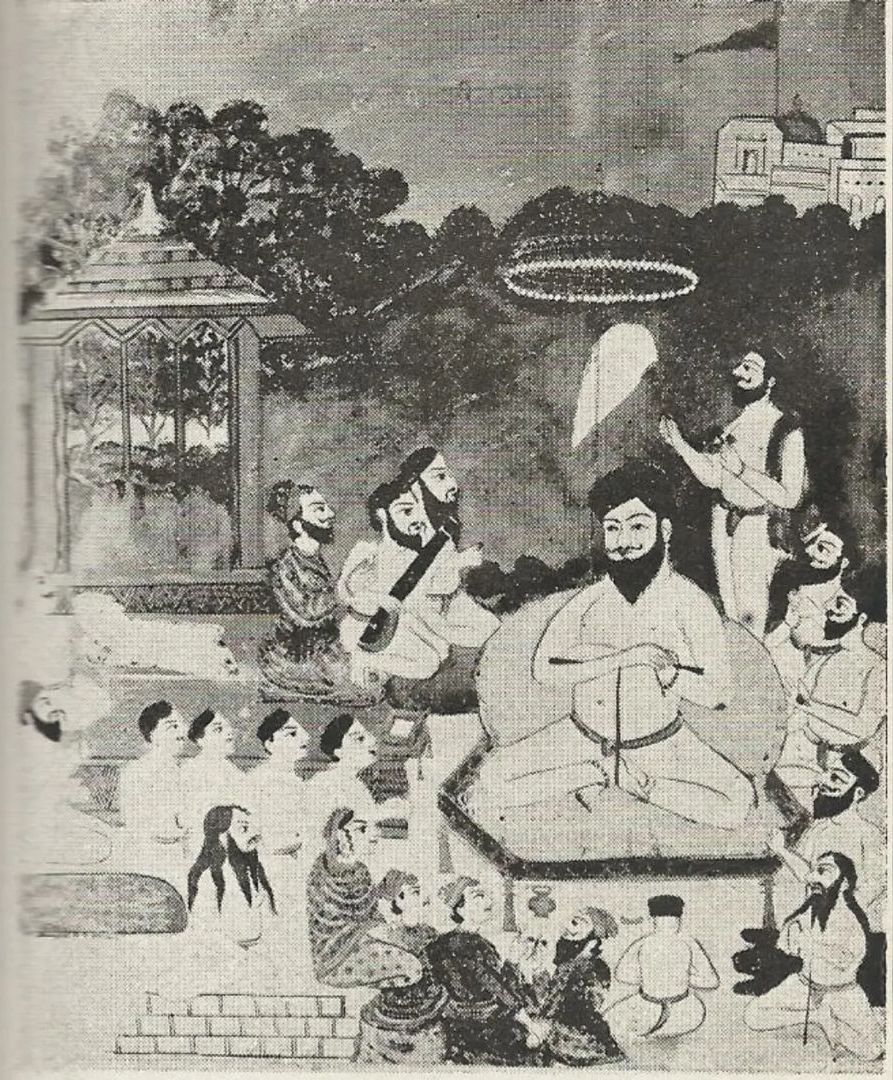
Painting of Mahant Pritam Das with retinue

After 1765, the Khalsa Sikhs conquered the Sirhind sarkar of the Delhi province and ended much of the state-power that had been oppressing them actively in the Punjab. The Udasis became more prevalent than before during the period of Khalsa Sikh-rule. The Udasis started receiving state-patronage from Sikh rulers and jagirdars in the late 18th century, with revenue-free land being bestowed to them, known as dharmarths. Both Sikh leaders in the trans-Sutlej and cis-Sutlej regions gave support to the Udasis. Muslim and Hindu rulers also patronized the Udasis and awarded them dharmarth grants, such as Raikot, Jammu, and Allah Yar Khan of Sahiwal. The Udasi establishments which had received non-Sikh administrative patraonage during the period of Sikh states was around 33%. In-total, of the around 250 Udasi establishments that were active during the period of Sikh-rule, around 180 of them received grants from the rulers, based upon surviving records at the National Archives of New Delhi, India and the Commissioner's Office of the Civil Secretariat, Chandigarh. Aside from grants given to institutions, some grants were given to Udasi individuals but these individual grants tended to be lesser in value when compared to the institutional grants. Between the 1790s and 1840s, the number of Udasi establishments expanded by 500%. By the mid-century, one estimate of the total amount of Udasi revenue-free land-grants at 200,000 rupees, which was 10% of the total of such religious grants.

This official state-patronage of the Udasis helped improved their esteem and popularity amongst all sections of Punjabi society. According to Sulakhan Singh, the Udasis following the Guru Granth concept but not the Guru Panth (which vested ruling and decision-making power in the Khalsa) aided the rulers and that is one of the reasons they offered the Udasis their patronage as they wanted to promote the Guru Granth and downplay the Guru Panth. The Sikh rulers at this time gave generous land and financial grants to the Udasi establishments, thus according to historian Surjit Singh Gandhi, corruption began to arise within them and proper morality, religiosity, and conduct declined. They began to operate Sikh sites as their sole jurisdiction without consulting the congregation (sangat) on matters, as they preferred power and influence to remain amongst themselves. Despite this decline in proper conduct, the Udasis still were held in high-esteem throughout Sikh-rule.

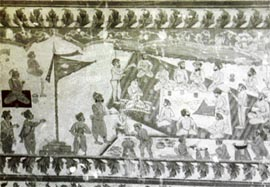
Fresco depicting a congregation of Udasis from the Sangalwala Akhara in Amritsar, Punjab

This allowed the Udasis to establish their deras and akharas, many of which were founded around the same time, such as the Brahm Buta near Darbar Sahib in Amritsar. These Udasis establishments were more prevalent in certain regions of Punjab, such as the middle and upper areas of the Bari, Rachna, and Bist doabs, being found in both urban and rural settings. The akharas, deras, dharamsalas, and gurdwaras of the Udasis provided indigenous educational services (such as Gurmukhi and Sanskrit learning) under an auxiliary school attached to their sites beholden to a mahant or sadh. These institutions included instructors who were granthis, brahmins, sadhs, or musicians to impart knowledge upon the students. Most of the Udasi educational institutions had around ten to twenty students studying at any given time, though some of the larger ones likely had more but still fewer than a hundred pupils. Subjects taught at the schools included Gurmukhi script, Sanskrit grammar and poetry, Sikh and Hindu scriptures, mathematics (such as multiplication and arithmetic), science, and morality. They also were proficient in and taught the Landa (Western Punjabic varieties), Urdu, Persian, and Arabic languages. The primary Sikh scripture, the Guru Granth Sahib, was an important subject to be taught at the Udasi schools and the mahants of the Udasi establishments may have also been carrying-out creating copies of the scripture. Despite this, according to Sulakhan Singh the education given at Udasi schools was still rather rudimentary and basic. Aside from spirituality, the Udasi educational establishments also taught mathematics, physiology, and medicine. The Udasis constructed auxiliary places of learning attached to the Darbar Sahib in Amritsar, which were known as buṅgās (hospices). There was an Udasi dera associated with Bhai Pirthi, known as Dera Manak Bhai Pirthi.

G. W. Leitner notes that Udasi institutions were providing education in a dozen districts of Punjab. The Brahm Buta Akhara was associated with the spiritual lineage of Baba Nārāyaṇa Dāsa, via Santokh Das. The Brahm Buta Akhara operated a Gurmukhi and Sanskrit grammar and poetry school out of its Santokhsar Shivala. The Sangalwara Akhara was associated with the spiritual lineage of Govinda Sahib, via Pritam Das. Other akharas that provided an education in Amritsar were the Ghamand Das Akhara, Kanshiwala Akhara, and Balanand Akhara. At Rashidpur in Jhang, the dharamsaal of Nanak Chand also was providing educational services to the population. Other Udasi educational aharas and dharamsaals were found at Gujrat, Dera Baba Nanak, Nankana Sahib, Bhai Pheroo, Bhoman Shah, Dipalpur, Maghiana, Chaharpur, Harnoli, Kotla Shamspur, Sheikhupura. Sarup Das was a prominent Udasi Ayurvedic scholar who had an Amritsari bunga associated with him. At Amritsar, the Udasi-associated bungas near the Golden Temple preached the Udasi message to pilgrims.

The Udasis also established their own organizations. In 1779, the Sri Pañca Paramesvara Udāsīna Pancāyata Akhārā was established as a central Udasi organization, which later became the Udasin Panchayati Bada Akhara. However in 1839 the followers of the sub-sect associated with Sangata Sahib, led by Sadhu Manohara Dasa, would break-away from the main Udasi akhara and found their own in Kankhal, known as the Sri Panca Paramesvara Udasina Pancayati Naya Akhara (simply known as the Udasin Panchayati Naya Akhara). At the 1796 Haridwar Kumbh Mela, the Udasis and Nirmalas were attacked by rival Gosains, who desecrated the Guru Granth Sahib, leading to a revenge attack by the Sikhs, some of whom belonged to Patiala.

They would set up establishments across North India through to Benares, where they would come to be joined with monastic asceticism. The combination of Hindu gods and the Sikh religious text indicated that the sect evolved over time under many historical influences and conditions, interpreting the message of Guru Granth Sahib in monistic Vedantic terms. They were initially largely based in urban centers where they set up their establishments, or akharas, only beginning to spread into rural areas during Sikh rule; before, they had around a dozen centres; by the end of Maharaja Ranjit Singh's reign, the number had increased to around 250. By the end of Sikh-rule, there were over a dozen Udasi orders or sub-sects operating in Punjab. By the end of the 18th century, around 50 Udasi establishments had a patron, with this number growing by 60 during the reign of Ranjit Singh and his successors. By the late period of the Sikh Empire, around ten percent of the empire's dharmarth granths were to Udasi establishments, with them numbering around 150 institutions and around twelve lakh rupees per annum. Around 75% of Udasi establishments, aside from individual grantees, had been awarded a dharmath grant. Furthermore, by this time the Udasis controlled at-least twelve historical sites/shrines associated with the Sikh gurus. During the reign of Maharaja Ranjit Singh, the Udasis became more corrupted in the eyes of mainstream Sikhs, who viewed them as distorting the original teachings of the Sikh gurus.

=== Colonial-period ===
Post-1849, the Udasis became more interested in political affairs, with the oncoming of a new, British-run administration in the Punjab. The Udasis of the colonial-era had much changed in regards to their lifestyle when compared to the historical Udasis. They began pushing for the land-grants that had been awarded in previous times to religious centres under their control to be written as being the property of Udasi individuals, thereby transforming communal, public religious sites into private properties. Their successors became dynastical and blood-linked, choosing members of their own family to succeed them as head of these now private properties in their possession, effectively turning formerly merit-based, public institutions and positions into private, heriditary ones. After colonization, the indigenous Udasi schooling system declined and was surmounted by the newly introduced Western modes of education. During the late 19th century, the Udasi mahants were producing copies of the Guru Granth Sahib.

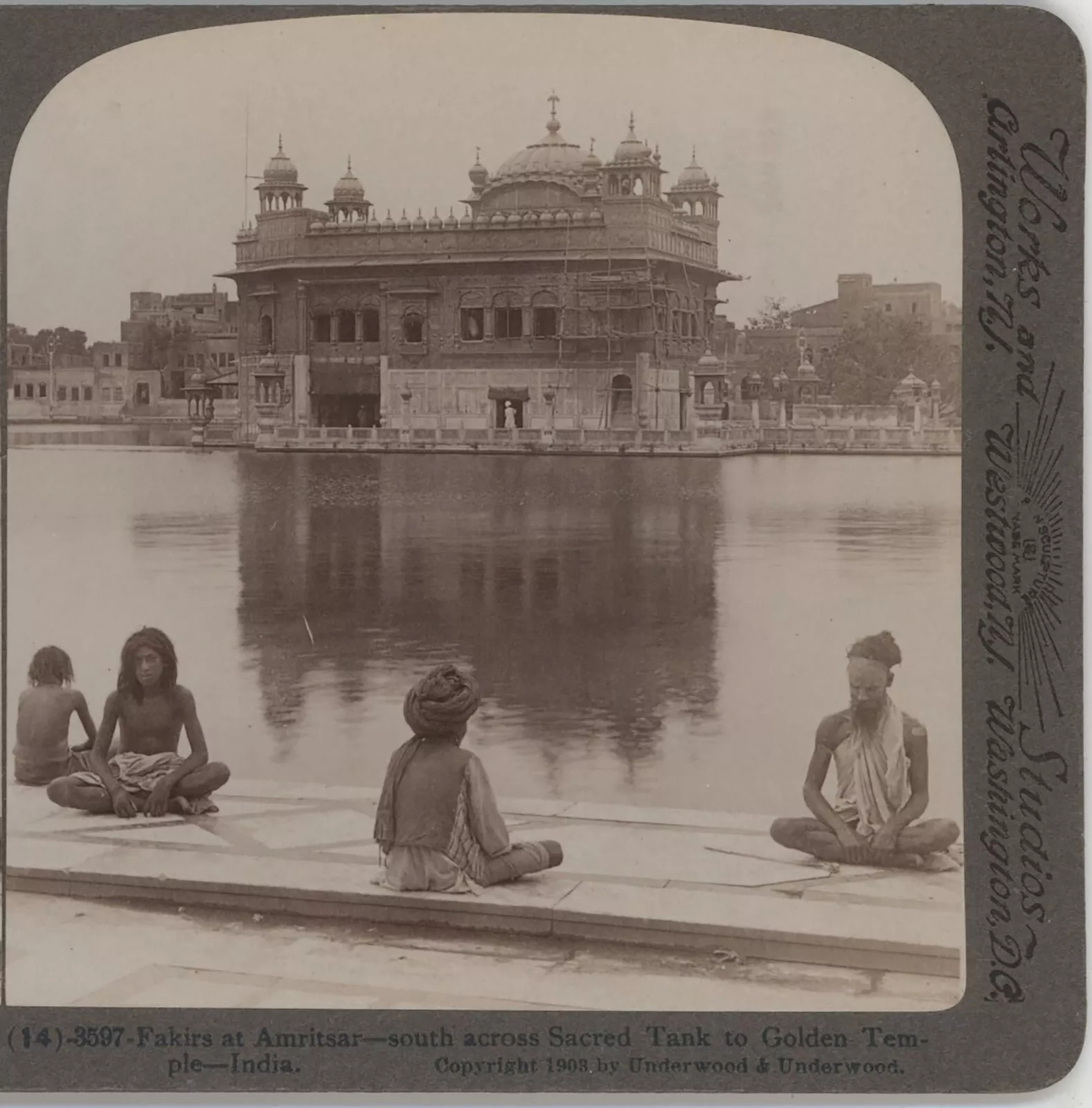
"Fakirs" meditating on the bank of the temple tank in the Golden Temple complex in Amritsar, by Underwood and Underwood, 1903

Many reformist Sikh at the time believed that the form of Sikhism preached by the Udasis was now too Hindu-inflected and began to oppose their management of Sikh institutions and sites. These frustrations would culminate in the Singh Sabha and Gurdwara Reform movements Before the emergence of the Singh Sabha Movement in the late 19th century, they controlled important Sikh shrines, including the Harimandir Sahib, generally known also as the Golden Temple, for a short while. The Nankana massacre of 1921 was carried-out by an Udasi mahant of Nankana Sahib named Narain Das, murdering many non-violent Akali protesters, which led to an outcry amongst Sikhs.

During the Akali movement of the 20th century, the Tat Khalsa Sikhs, after five years of campaigning, expelled them from the Sikh shrines, accusing them of vices and of indulging in ritual practices that were against the teachings of the Sikh gurus. The Sikh Gurdwara Reform Act, 1925 defined the term "Sikh" in a way that excluded the syncretic groups like Udasis, Nanakpanthis, and other groups who maintained transitional identities. Thus, stewardship over Sikh sites passed from a hereditary system of mahants, usually Udasis, to a democratically elected board, the Shiromani Gurdwara Parbandhak Committee. The descendants of the Udasi figure Gurbaksh Das, who had been caretaking Sikh sites in Anandpur, had their stewardship confiscated by the SGPC. Some Udasis attempted to re-characterize sites under their control as deras instead of gurdwaras in-order to maintain their control over the site, as possession of gurdwaras was legally passed over to the SGPC. In order to legitimize this characterization, they began removing Sikh scriptures, such as the Guru Granth Sahib, from their premises. Subsequently, the Udasis increasingly identified themselves as Hindus rather than Sikhs. They successfully obtained a court-decree that classified themselves as Hindus rather than Sikhs. The Sikh Gurdwaras Act of 1925 only had validity in what is today Punjab, Haryana, and Chandigarh, therefore many of the Sikh shrines and sites laying outside the historical Punjab region was able to remain under Udasi control, even up until today. The disavowment of Sikhism by the Udasis after the 1920s has had a negative impact on the religion's missionary activities, with the loss of Udasi preachers and centres.

=== Present-day ===
The Udasis still operate their own establishments. Some of their sites which are still active are the Brahm Buta and Sanglanwala akharas in Amritsar, the Niranjania Akhara in Patiala, and the Panchaiti Akhara in Haridwar. The Udasis of today still have reservations with the Khalsa Sikh identity. In 2002, the Supreme Court of India, after a 25-year-old litigation between the SGPC and an Udasi mahant of a dera, made a ruling that the Udasi deras were not Sikh gurdwaras, thus their places of worship could not be considered gurdwaras and the SGPC could not forcibly take them over. In-response, the Dharam Prachar Committee (DPC) of the Shiromani Gurdwara Parbandhak Committee declared both Udasis and Nirmalas to be "Sikhs". An Udasi organization active in Punjab is the Udaseen Taksaal International led by Sant Gurpreet Singh Udasi.

== Beliefs and practices ==
=== Relation to other groups ===
Udasi beliefs and practices are often juxtaposed with that of mainstream Sikhs. The Udasis differed from the orthodox Sikhs in-regards to their Brahmanical and Vedantic influenced beliefs, practices, doctrines, and rituals. Such differing aspects were in-regards to incarnation, renunciation, austerities, asceticism, celibacy, life-style, wealth, property, and hair-cutting. Furthermore, the Sikh conceptualization of God was more of a personal relationship whilst the Udasi take was more of an impersonal reality. Sikhs placed more emphasis on devotion (bhakti) whilst Udasis also hold knowledge and meditation to be critical for the spiritual path.

While orthodox Sikhs advocate for the life of a householder (grist-marg and kirat karana), the Udasis instead advocate for the path of renunciation (Udas) and celibacy, known as nivṛtti mārga. Thus, they do not neatly fit into the modern-day definition of a Sikh as per the Shiromani Gurdwara Parbandhak Committee's Sikh Rehat Maryada despite them having reverence for the Sikh gurus, as they do not follow mainstream Sikh rites. Because of these differences, many orthodox Sikhs classify the Udasis as Sanatanis. Philosophically, the Udasis are orientated toward the Vedantic school, placing focus on moral discipline, celibacy, detachment, contentment, humility, patience, and asceticism. The Udasis were also heavily influenced by the Naths, such as their practice of hatha-yoga and adoption of hearths (dhuni or dhuan). Whilst mainstream Sikhs paid a lot of attention to secular matters, the Udasis focused entirely on spiritual pursuits. Whilst the Udasis believe in the Guru Granth concept, they do not follow the Guru Panth tradition, which believes the Khalsa is a form of the Sikh guruship. They do not shun idolatry like mainstream Sikhs, they often keep murtis of Sri Chand, Guru Nanak, Vishnu, or Shiva. Whilst the Udasis claim to be followers of the mainstream Sikh gurus from Guru Nanak to Guru Gobind Singh, they also put their faith in the lineage of Sri Chand, which continues on to their living mahants of which-ever branch they belong to. They believed Sri Chand to be an incarnation of God.

In addition to not consider the Khalsa's Rehat Maryada to be binding on them, their modes of thought and attitude towards salvation also differed significantly. The Khalsa believed that salvation could be attained while taking part in society and pursuing secular objectives like political power and accumulation of resources like agrarian land, though this had to be accomplished within a particular framework of beliefs and spiritual practices, chief among which was the societal order and structure of the Khalsa. The Udasis considered secular pursuits to be incompatible with personal salvation, which was to be achieved only through renouncing the world, espousing asceticism and a monastic traveler lifestyle. Udasis are known for their akharas along with the Nirmala sect of Sikhism.

=== Philosophy ===
The Udasis do not identify with the secular and material world, which is identified as the pravṛtti mārga (sensory indulgence). They aim to reach a state of brahma-bhāva and also a state of being nirāśa (without expectations) and nirbhaya (without fear). They believe they can achieve a state of salvation via gyan (wisdom), karam (action), and bhakti (devotion). They combine both jñāna mārga (knowledge) and bhakti mārga (devotion), also combining deva pujā (worship of deities) with guru pujā (worship of teachers). They believed in the oneness of the divine but that there were incarnations (avatars) of it, with Sri Chand being a form of the omnipresent God. They affirmed the concepts of karma (karma siddhanta) and samsara (rebirth). Their envisionment of the divine incorporates both Nirgun and Sargun aspects. The Udasis also worship the panchayatana, the five Hindu deities: Shiva, Vishnu, Durga, Ganesha, and Surya, with this veneration known as pancadevopasana. The Kārṣṇi Udāsī Sampradāya venerate both Radha-Krishna and the Shivalinga. They aspire for the divine knowledge of Brahma Vidya, as they believe it was passed on from Narayana, Brahma, Atharvā, Dadhīcī, Pippalāda, six munis (Suketa, Satyakama, Gargya, Kausalya, Bhārgava, Kabandhi), and then to the world. They additionally venerate Sri Chand, their founder, his father Guru Nanak, the Guru Granth Sahib, and perform tomb-worship at samadhs of religious figures, especially of fellow Udasis. Aside from the primary Sikh scripture, the Udasis also hold the Hindu texts, chiefly the Vedas, Puranas, Dharmashastras, and the Itihases, in high-regard. They also revere the cow (gau), Ganges river (gaṇgā), and the sacred chant (gāyatrī). The Udasis can be either or both sadhus or siddhas. The Udasi sadhus believe that they can go through four life-stages:

- Muni: total renunciation (sannyāsa dharma)
- Ṛṣi: detached life, such as in the wilderness (vānaprasthi)
- Sewaka: life of a house-holder who performs service. They are unable to preach or give initiation.
- Nirvaṇa: a special-class of sadhus (known as caturathasrami), who wear smeared-ash from the sacred-hearth (dhuan) on their body, shun women, avoid money or precious metal, and are semi-naked, wearing only a langoṭa or kaupīna (strip of cloth between the legs that has a loin-string attachment). They are able to preach or give initiation, which is known as diksa.

=== Ceremonies and rituals ===
Their morning and evening worship-sessions consist of the ārati or āratā, they perform using fire, chant mantras communally, ring bells (known as ghaṇṭī or ghaṛīāl), blow a special trumpet-like instructment (called a siṅghī, narasinghā, or narasinghī), blow into a conch-shell (śankha), and incorporate sacred iconography and symbolism (such as depictions of Nanak or Sri Chand). After their daily aarti ceremony in the evening, they chant select couplets (known as chhandes) from two of their Udasi texts. Whilst some of their daily Nitnem consists of prayers they share with mainstream Sikhs (such as the Kirtan Sohila, Japji Sahib, and Rehras Sahib), they also chant matras associated with Sri Chand and hymns attributed to Kabir, Mirabai, Surdas, and other figures.

The Udasis maintain a permanent and continuous fire at their dhuni, which is an influence from Hatha-Yoga. They offer alcohol (known as madira) to their sacred fire. The jaikara of the Udasis is: Gājo ji Srī Canda hare, meaning "speak loudly that Sri Chand is great" or Gājo Jī Vāhgurū ("glory to god", originating from Pritam Das). Other salutations used by them include paireen paine ("I worship your feet") and mattha takna ("I bow with my head"). They use the terms Waheguru and Alakh to describe God. Their ardaas prayer differs from the mainstream Sikh one. They believe that evil-eye can be defended against through the use of nazarvattu charms. Some types of Udasis venerate ash-balls, which they call golā. The practice of venerating the ash-balls is called gole di puja (common amongst the followers of Sangat Sahib and Pritam Das). The Udasis venerate their version of the Nishan Sahib flag. They also worship charanpadika.

=== Incantations ===
For an Udasi, a mātrā (incantation or scripture) is a way to attain supreme-truthfulness (param tattva) and spiritual release (mukti). They claim certain matras originate from different figures, such as Guru Nanak, Sri Chand, Baba Gurditta, Almast, Phul, and Bhagat Bhagvan, but they hold the matras linked to Sri Chand as the most special and treasured. The matras are considered secretive principles by them. There are two versions of a maha-mantra favoured by the Udasis, which venerate Indic deities and Sri Chand:

Version One

Hare Rāma, Hare Kṛṣṇa, Hare Govinda, Śrī Candra Caitanya Nānaka Nanda

Translation:
Version Two

Hare Rāma, Hare Kṛṣṇa, Hare Govinda, Śrī Prabhu Nit Nandā

=== Lifestyle and conduct ===
Udasis are celibates, vegetarians, and teetotalers. Sometimes they consume different types of cannabis concoctions, known as bhang and charas, and also some use opium. When someone becomes initiated as an Udasi, they are supposed to cut all sense of identity to their family. Although they usually cremated their dead, sometimes they buried them.

=== Initiation ===
For their initiation ceremony, they perform charan-amrit rather than the Khalsa amrit-sanskar, which instead consists of five Udasi mahants dipping their toes in water and the initiate drinking the water. After initiation, the person must wear salmon-coloured clothing (known as bhangven) and shun both gold and women. While Khalsa Sikhs append the title Singh to their names after baptism and initiation, the Udasis append the title Das or Brahm after theirs, with their personal-name also changing. A type of sweet food, called halva, is then distributed to those present at the ceremony.

Furthermore after initiation, an Udasi will wear a langot, be given a bath in ash, be adorned with a tilak mark, be given a mala rosary, be bestowed with a seli, be given a turban (pagri) or cap (topi), a brahmanchal (cloth), be taught the guru-mantra of their guru, may have some of their head-hair cut, and they are required to recite hymns from the Udasi texts Shri Chandra Matra and Guru Pranali, and are re-named, with them no-longer associating with their birth-name or family-name. After, the initiate expresses thanks to the mahant(s) and others present and is served parshad, they are also given the bhagwa-coloured clothing to be worn for life, and the Onkar and Vedas are recited. Also, a bhandara is held and rot prashad is served to the initiates. These initiates can become two types of members: Nirvan and Paramhans, differentiates by their conduct and required articles to be kept/worn. House-holding Udasis, known as Grahist, can also become initiates, where after they are only served parshad and become known as Sewak types.

=== Caste ===
Udasis come from all castes and occupational-backgrounds. In-regards to their caste, the Udasis consider themselves to belong to the swan varna (known as hamsa) and the eternal gotra (known as acyuta).

== Appearance and attire ==
According to 18th-century descriptions, they either cut or matted their hair (with matted hair known as jaṭādhāris) under a turban, rather than knot it under a turban like Khalsas, and instead of the Khalsa emphasis on the panj kakkar garb and sporting arms, their dress code would include items such as a cap, a cotton bag, a flower rosary, a vessel made of dried pumpkin, a chain around the waist, ash to smear on their body, and a deerskin upon which to perform hatha yoga, resulting in an extremely divergent appearance from Khalsa Sikhs in the eighteenth century. The Udasis had varying levels of adherence to kesh (uncut hair). Most Udasis do not shave their heads (munḍa munḍānā). However, the Diwani Udasis cut their hair and blackened their faces. Meanwhile, the followers of Bhagat Bhagwan had their hair in locks known as jatan. Some of them keep unshorn hair on five parts of their body, known as pañcakeśī.

Their clothing is usually salmon or saffron-coloured, associated with gurus. However, others prefer to wear white, green, or red, while others still prefer to be without clothes (naked). Udasis wear ochre (which they call gerūā), white, or black-coloured, un-stiched clothing on their lower-body, which they call guru-gātī. Some wear a red-coloured chola with a black scarf. Some Udasis wear the kafani cola, which is also associated with Muslim fakirs. There is a unique robe associated with the Udasis known as the majithi chola. The Udasis wear seli-topi (woolen thread and a head-cap), with their seli having 1,108 knots. In-addition, they wear a khinthā (patched-quilt), jholī (bag), and a mālā (rosary). Their rosaries are either beads constructed out of tulsi, sandalwood, or rudraksha, knotted woolen, or flowers (phulmala). Some Udasis wear earrings in their right-ear, specifically mudrā earrings. For footwear, they favour wooden kharavan or khaḍaon.

The nomadic Udasi sadhus (known as ghummakaḍa) additionally carry a stick (danda) for defense, a hollowed gourd or pumpkin (tumbī) for water, a black asan, and a deer-pelt (mṛgachālā) to sit upon. Udasis who are disciples of specific lineages or sub-sects may have additional or unique items they wear. For example, those belonging to the lineage of Pritam Das, Sangat Sahib, and Bhakta Bhagavana wear a kara bracelet and janjīrī waist-chain. Nanga Udasis go completely naked except for a brass waist-chain. Diwani Udasis wear shell-necklaces on their turban (pagri). Some of the Udasis, such as the Nangas, Nirbans, and Niranjanias, smear their bodies with ash and wore just a loin-cloth. Certain types wear a cord around their head, waist, and neck. They often adorn themselves with a tilak (bodily marking) and janeu (sacred-thread).

The Udasis have their own religious-flag, which they call the dharma dhvaja ("flag of righteousness"). Its symbols feature a hand mark (known as panjā) and a peacock feather decoration.

== Factions ==
=== Dhūāṅ sects ===
There are various Dhūāṅ sub-sects within the Udasis, some of them being: (Note: The word dhūāṅ is a Punjabi word meaning "smoke", in the Udasi context it refers to a hearth or missionary-order where a permanent fire is kept burning.)

- Almast dhūāṅ - the Dhūāṅ Bhāī Almast Jī Kā was based out of Nanakmatta and preached in the eastern areas of the Indian subcontinent, such as Dhaka, Patna, and Puri.
- Phūl dhūāṅ - the Dhūāṅ Bhāī Phūl Jī Kā preached in the area of Punjab between the Sutlej and Beas rivers, namely the Doaba region
- Goind (or Gondā) dhūāṅ - the Dhūāṅ Bhāī Goind/Gondā Jī Kā preached in southern Punjab, namely Malwa
- Bālū Husnā dhūāṅ - the Dhūāṅ Bhāī Bālū Hasnā Jī Kā preached in western Punjab and Kashmir.

=== Bakhshishāṅ sects ===
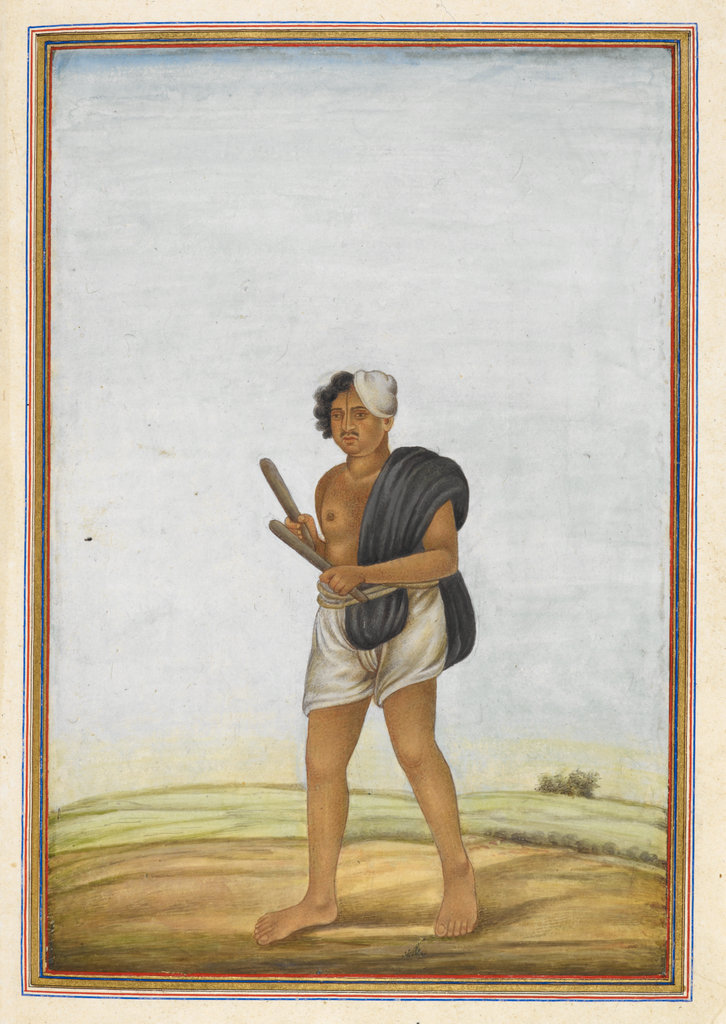
'Suthrasahi, an order of Sikh ascetics', a painting from the Tashrih al-Aqvam, circa 1825

After the four dhūāṅs, another sub-sect of Udasis emerged known as Bakhshishāṅ. There were six prominent groups of this type, them namely being:

- Bhagat Bhagvanie (followers of Bhagat Bhagvan)
- Suthrashahie (followers of Suthrashah)
- Sangat Sahibie (followers of Sangat Sahib)
- Mihan Shahie or Mihall Dasie, so called after Mihan, the title conferred by Guru Tegh Bahadur on Ramdev
- Bakht Mallie (followers of Bakht Mall)
- Jit Mallie (followers of Jit Mall)

Some less popular or widespread Bakhshishan sects were the Gurdas Ke, Sodhi Dakhni Rai Ke, Sadhu Nand Lal Ke, Dewane/Dewanas/Diwanis, Hira Dasiei, and Ram Dasiei. The Diwanis were originally a Mina sub-sect that later became subsumed by the Udasis.

=== Other sects ===
There were also the Niranjanias. The Ramraiyans, founded by Ram Rai, were also a type of Udasi.

=== Types of Udasi initiates and sadhus ===
Sadhus can also be divided into which of the four life-stages they are living in, Muni, Ṛṣi, Sewaka, or Nirvaṇa. The Udasi disciples or students are known as a chelā. Another way of classifying the Udasis is by marital status, with those who are married being known as the Sant Udasi (sub-divided into Grahist and Chaturthasharmi) and those who remain unmarried are the Sadhu Udasi. There is also a three-part division system: those who are house-holders (Grahist), those who are not house-holders and who appoint a successor prior to death, and thirdly the Nirvan.

There are four general types of Udasis:

- Grahist: house-holders
- Sewak: house-holders who have undergone the Udasi initiation ceremony
- Nirvan: non-house-holders who have undergone the Udasi initiation ceremony who are nomadic in their preaching, smear ash on their body, and keep/wear long-hair (jatadhari), seli-topi, toomba, band, mrigchala (deer-pelt), gola sahib, chipi, kopin, mekhala, and make use of dhuni
- Paramhans: non-house-holders who have undergone the Udasi initiation ceremony, are supposed to remain in good-spirits and not be affected by emotions, and forgo clothing, remaining naked, not keeping a danda or kamandal but keeping a kopin, and believing bathing to be immaterial

There are six sub-types of Udasi sadhus of the Chaturthasharmi type:

- Kuṭicaka: monks at a hermitage, there are three further divisions of this kind:
  - Kutia residers
  - Snandhari residers
  - Mathadhish residers
- Bahudaka: nomadic monks
- Hamsa: monks with the ability to discern between noumena (without the senses) and phenomena (with the senses)
- Paramahamsa: monks who are considered liberated and do not have to wear the external signs of an Udasi
- Turiyātīta: monks who have reached a state of fourth-dimensionalism
- Avadhuta: monks without any attachment to the world and are unbothered

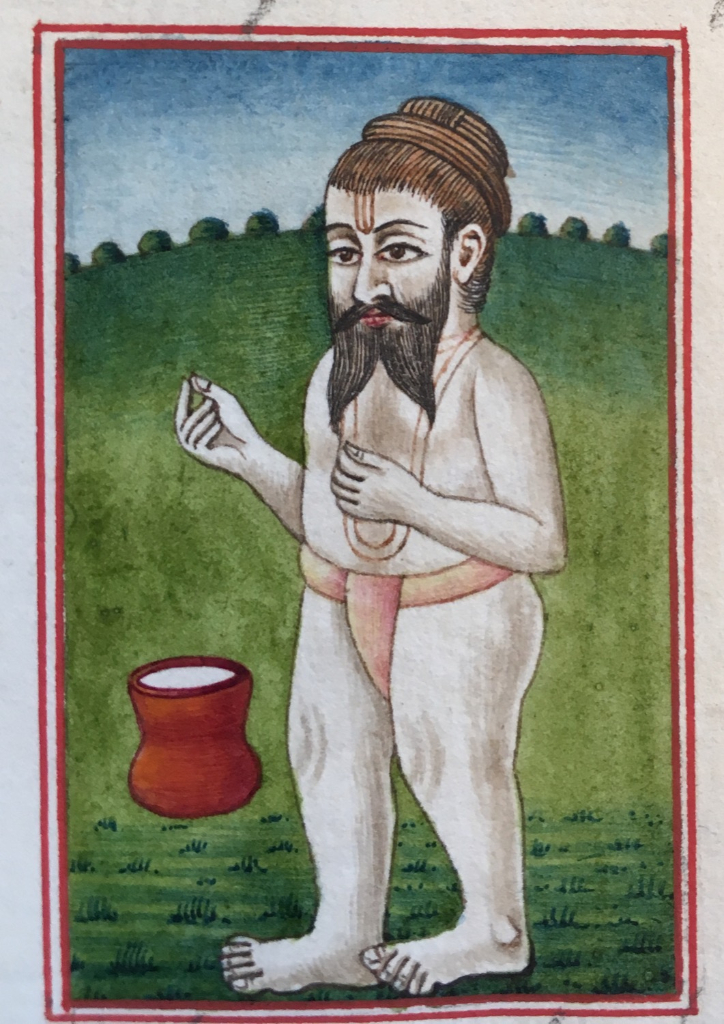
Painting of a "Naga" Udasi ascetic from a folio of a manuscript of the Silsilah-i-Jogiyan, ca.1800

There are also the Naga (Nāngā), followers of this sect remain naked except for a brass chain worn around the waist. They are the followers of Pritam Das.

== Places of worship and shrines ==
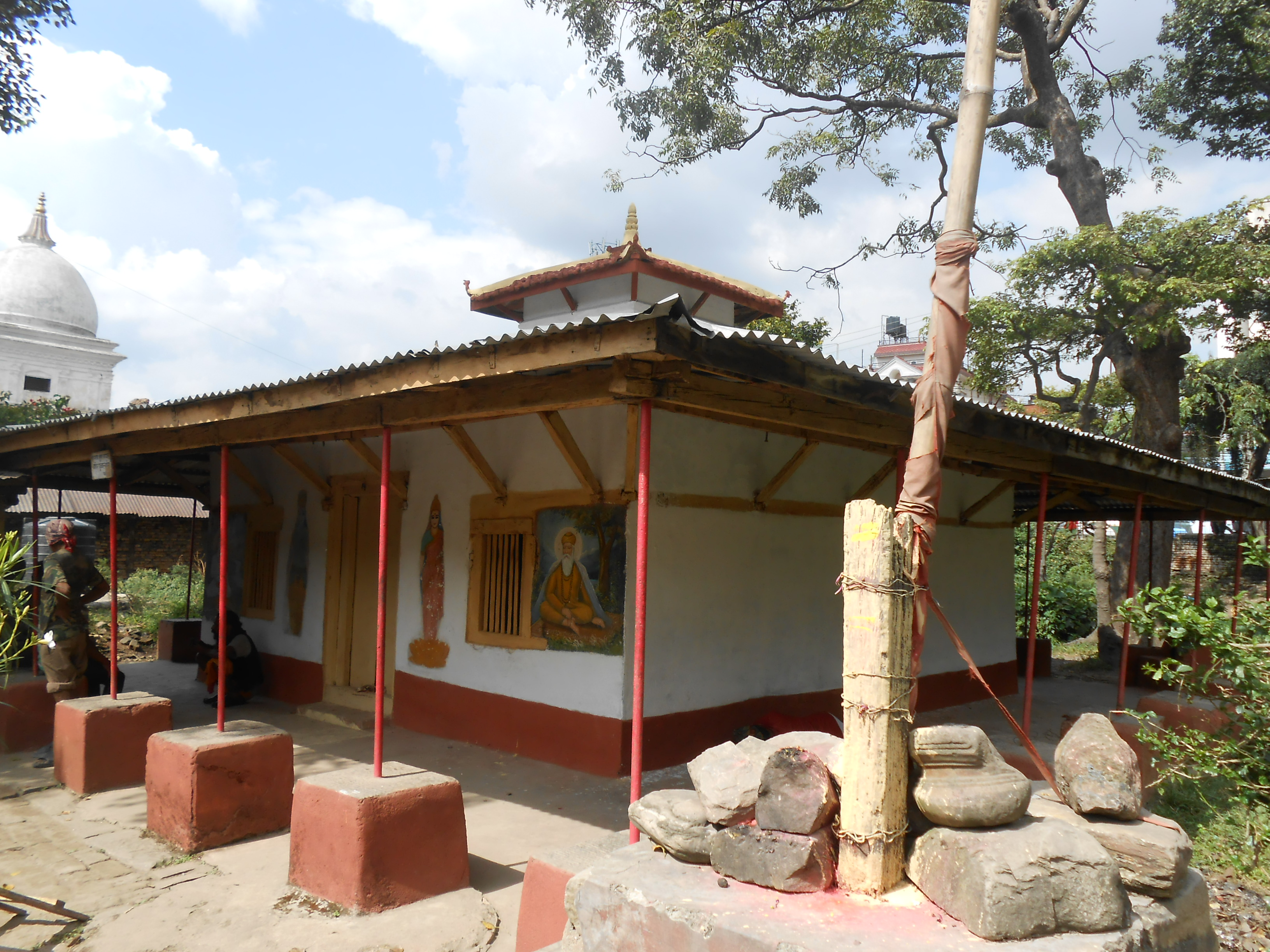
An Udasi shrine in Nepal

Various terms are used to refer to Udasi-affiliated sites and structures, such as dera, math, sangata, ashram, gurukula, tapovanas, akhara, bunga, dharamsaal, gurdwaras, darbars, or samadh. Places of worship associated with Udasis are known as akharas or darbars. The latter term finds heavy usage in Sindh. There are three general classifications of Udasi sites and centres: those established and connected with a mahant or sadh, those established at a site or place associated with a Sikh guru, and those put-up at a place or site linked with a contemporary associate of the Sikh gurus.

The title of a leader of an Udasi akhara or darbar is mahant, but some groups prefer to use the term Gaddi Nashin. The term for a follower or student at an Udasi site is chela. Their sacred ash (vibhuti) is known as bhabuta while their hearths are known as a dhuna. Their flag is known as a dhvajā while monasteries are known as a maṭha. The Guru Granth Sahib is installed at and read from in their monasteries. Students and disciples are taught the Guru Granth Sahib and classical texts. The students and their teacher often travel together to places of pilgrimage, holding discources and debates. Thus, Udasis are usually found at their centres but they may also be travellers and nomads, visiting various places of pilgrimage in Punjab and outside of it, with these types not staying static, remaining mobile wanderers.

The word akhara is traditionally associated with wrestling but it implies a different meaning as used by Sikh sects like the Udasis and Nirmalas. Another word used for Udasi centres of spirituality is dera. Traditionally, the Udasis claim Sri Chand as being the establisher of many akharas but historically, they first appeared in the mid-18th century when Mahant Nirvan Pritam Das established the Panchayti akhara in 1779, as per Sikh historian Kahn Singh Nabha in the Mahan Kosh. Mahant Nirvan Pritam Das also founded akhara centres in Kashi Kankhal (Haridwar) and other places of Indic pilgrimage sites. Prominent Udasi akharas that participate in the Kumbh were established in the 1800s, including the Shree Panchayati Akhada Bada Udasin (est. 1825) by Yogiraj Shri Nirvandev in Haridwar, and Shree Panchayati Akhada Naya Udasin (est. 1846) by Mahant Sudhir Das after a dispute with the Bada Udasin. The word bada means "large" while naya means "new". The Udasin akharas have a unique practice of initiating children and orphans as naga-sadhu disciples.

Traditionally, there were four Udasi centres (akharas or dhuans) with each controlling a certain preaching area; Nanakmatta, Kashmir, Malwa (Punjab) and Doaba. An Udasi akhara, named Dera Baba Bhuman Shah, dedicated to the Udasi saint Bhuman Shah was formerly located in Behlolpur in Pakistan but it has since been abandoned since the 1947 partition of India. There is an Udasi ashram located in Jalandhar known as the Pritam Bhawan Udãsîn Ashram, which contains the Swami Sant Das School. By the mid-19th century in Punjab, there were at least 250 Udasi establishments but likely more since this figure is only considering the establishments which received official patronage or are directly mentioned in records. As per Oberoi, there were four main types of Udasi establishments:

- Those established at settlements associated with the Sikh gurus, such as the Brahmbuta Akhara near the Golden Temple in Amritsar
- Those controlling shrines associated with Guru Nanak, Guru Ram Das, Guru Arjan, and Guru Hargobind, such as the Udasi establishment at Dera Baba Nanak
- Those associated with sites connected to figures from Sikh history, such as the Udasi establishment at the shrine of Baba Buddha in Amritsar
- Those which have none of the above characteristics often founded at popular places of pilgrimage, such as those established at Haridwar and Dera Ismail Khan

=== Structure and layout ===
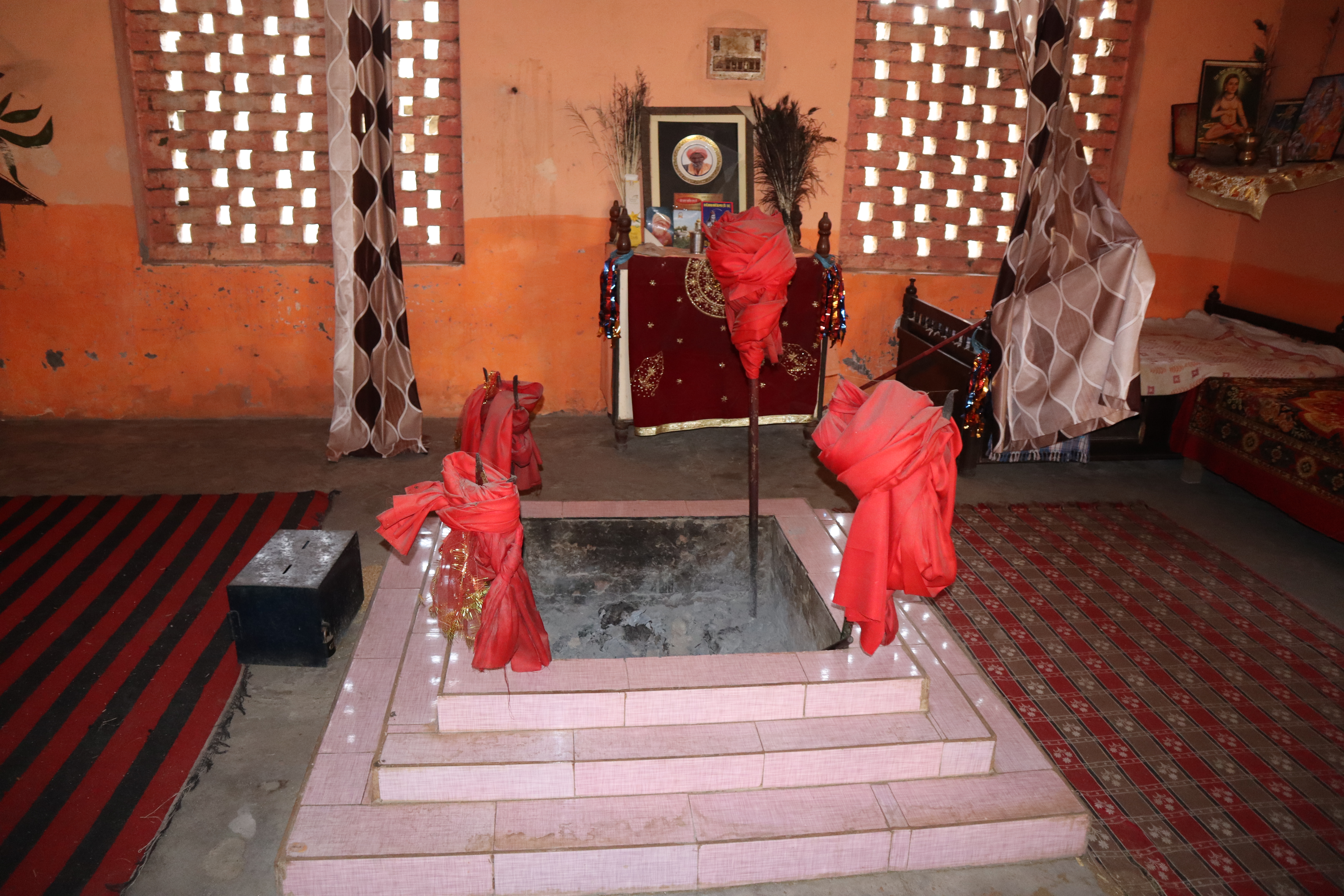
Photograph of an Udasi sacred-hearth ('dhuni') found within an Udasi-affiliated religious compound located in Chugawan village, Moga district, Punjab, India, April 2023

A deori is the gateway to site. A dhuna or dhuan refers to a hearth where Udasi followers practice yogic activities and other religious practices, such as adhna and yagya. A dhuni refers to a campfire where a sacred fire occurs. Every Udasi place of worship contains a flag called a gerua, which is the colour of red-ochre and topped with wings from a peacock. A thara is a place where sacred verses are recited. A dharamshala are guesthouses where pilgrims and visitors would stay. Langar khana refers to the area where a free kitchen is carried out.

=== Amritsar ===
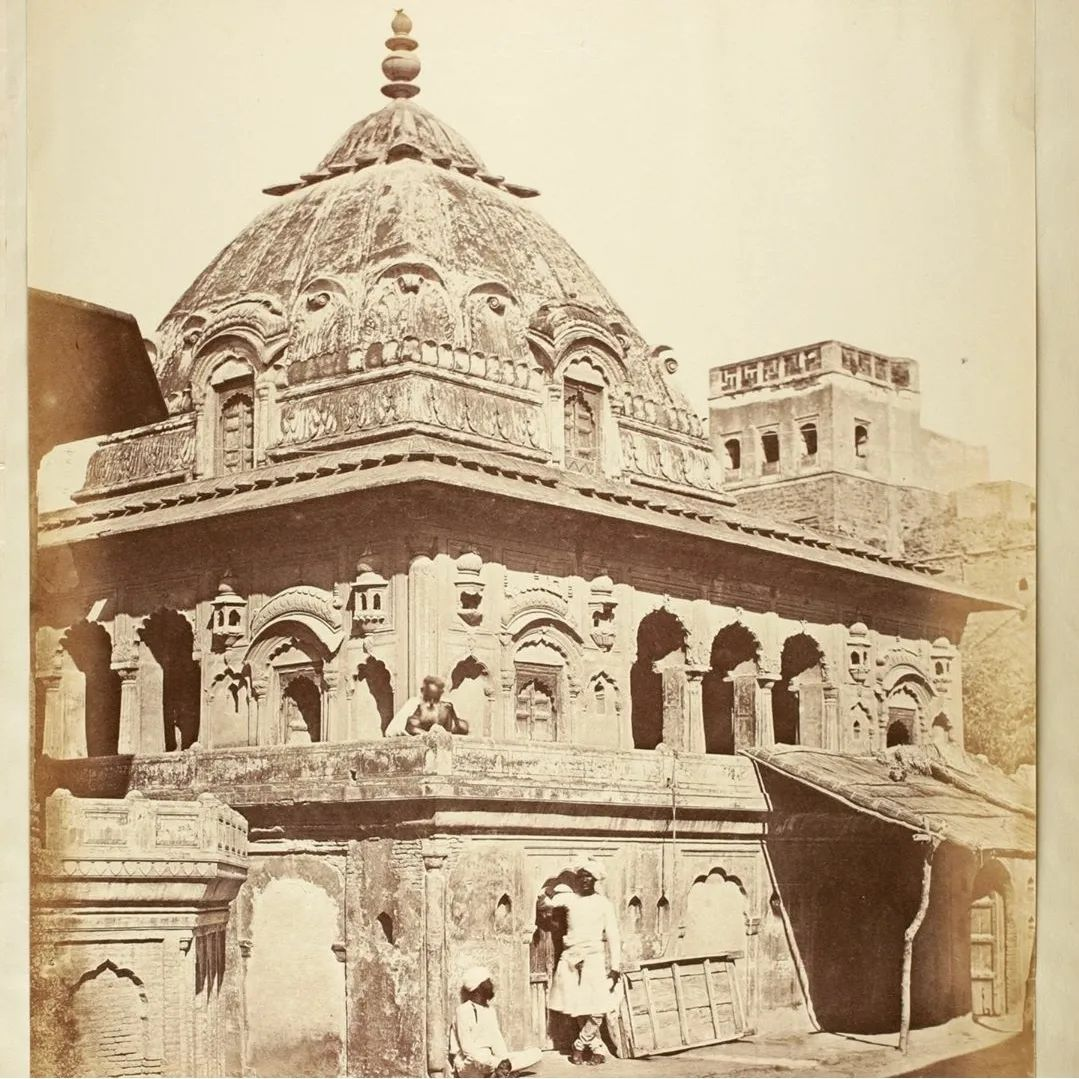
Photograph titled 'A Temple in Amritsar' taken in 1859 by Felice Beato. Identified as the original Udasi shrine of the Sangalwala Akhara in Amritsar.

At one point, there were a total of 12 main Udasi akharas in the city of Amritsar among others. They are as follows:

- Akhara Tehal Das, now abandoned.
- Akhara Mahant Bala Nand, founded in 1775, rebuilt in 1888 as a three-storied structure by Mahant Bhishambar Prashad. It was a centre of Sanskrit learning until 1984.
- Akhara Kashi Wala, founded by Mahant Narain Das in 1795, located near Darwaza Sultanvind.
- Akhara Shatte Wala, originally named Akhara Parag Das.
- Akhara Brahm Buta, said to be the oldest akhara of the city. Sri Chand is said to have stayed here when he visited the city during the guruship of Guru Ram Das. Mahant Nirban Santokh Das was associated with this akhara.
- Akhara Bibbeksar, founded by Mahant Balak Nath, later shifted to Haridwar.
- Akhara Kashi Wala of Gheo Mandi, founded by Mahant Sharan Das during the first half of the 19th century. It was founded on land gifted by Maharaja Ranjit Singh that belonged to the village of Tung. It remains active as an Udasi spiritual centre.
- Sanglan Wala Akhara, founded by Mahant Pritam Das in 1788 in Bazaar Mai Sevan.
- Akhara Chitta, founded by Mahant Ganga Ram Viakarani in Bazaar Mai Sevan during the Sikh Misl period.
- Akhara Ghamand Das
- Akhara Mahant Prem Das
- Akhara Sarigalvala
- Akhara Karishivala, near Darwaza Ghi Mandi
- Akhara Babeksar
- Akhara Samadhiarivala

== Music ==
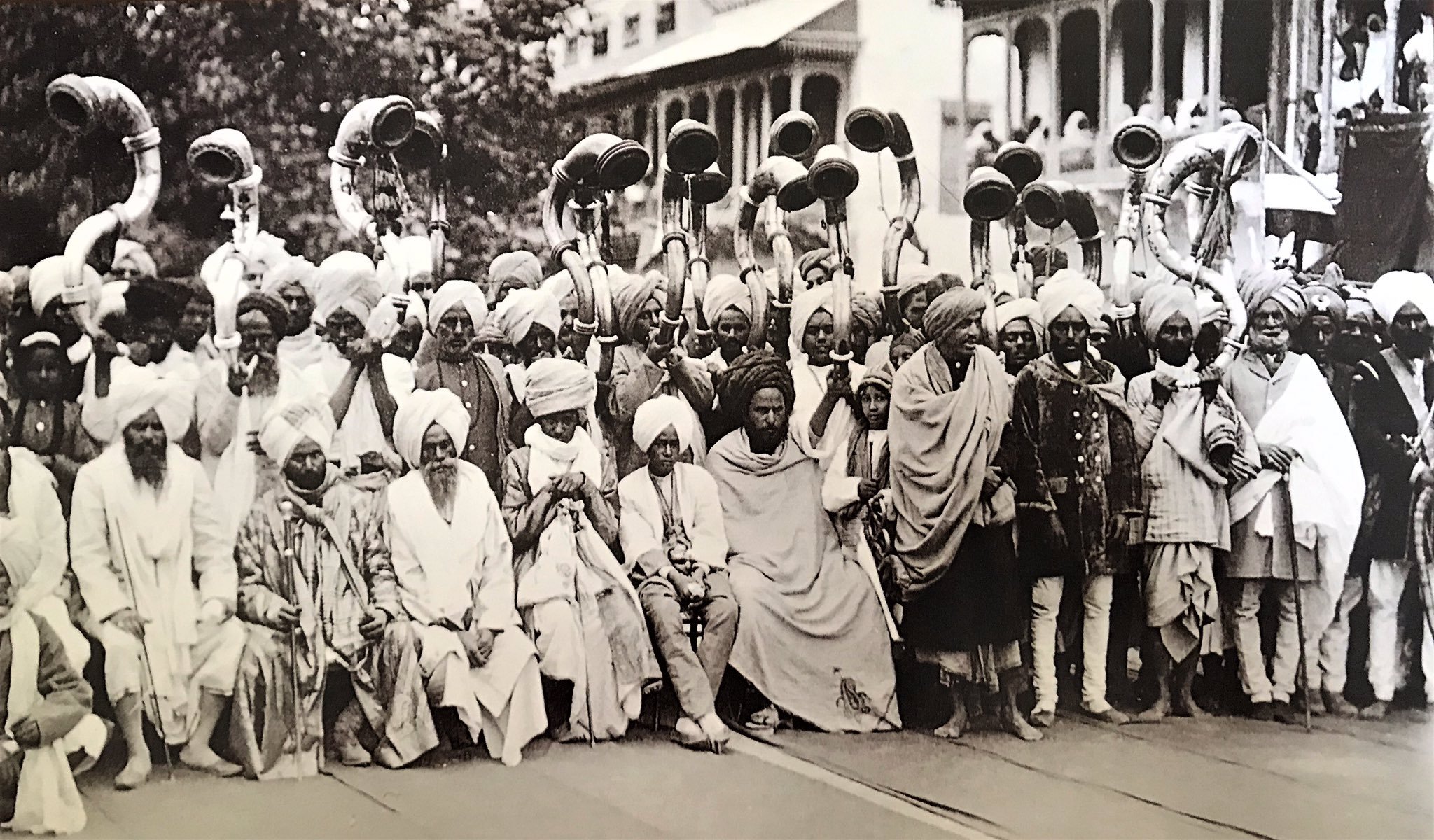
Narsingha or Ransingha ('war trumpets') Udasi Sikh Mahants await the Prince of Wales on his visit to Amritsar, ca.1905.

The term Gawantaris refers to Udasi musicians. A commonly played instrument of the Udasis is the Narasingha horn, used to inform the public about religious processions. Their daily religious services incorporate ghanti/gharial bells and narsingha/singhi trumpets.

== Literature ==
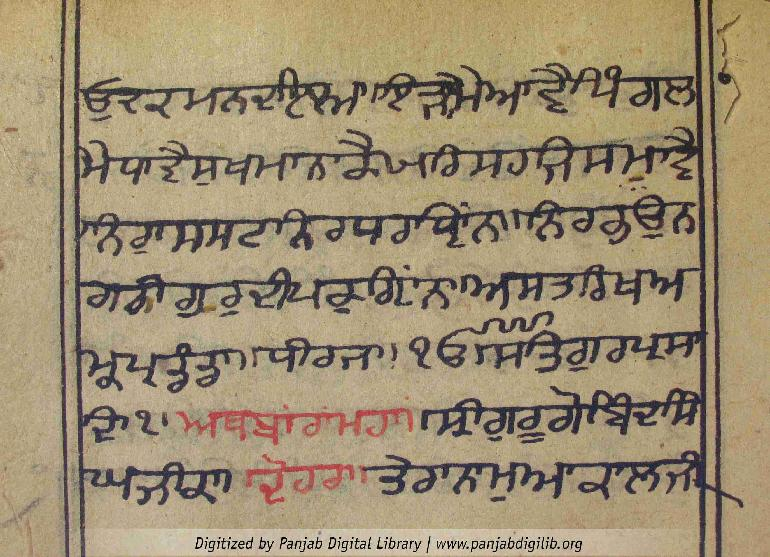
Folio of a manuscript of Matra Sahib, attributed to Sri Chand

The Udasis favoured Sadh Bhakha. The Udasis wrote their own explanations, interpretations, and commentaries on both Hindu and Sikh texts and scriptures. They also authored their own versions of both the Janamsakhi and Gurbilases literary genres. The Udasis claim to have written the earliest available codex of the Ād Granth. According to Surjit Singh Gandhi, around half (50%, perhaps more) of available, historical manuscripts of the correct version of the Guru Granth Sahib, Vaaran of Bhai Gurdas, and compositions of Bhai Nand Lal were written by Udasi scholars and copyists. Their exegetical works are distinguished from that of the Nirmalas as the Udasis tended to only give one meaning to a word or phrase where as the Nirmalas often breakdown a single phrases into separate words and give many meanings of each single word.

Udasis use the term mātrā, originally referring to a phonetic-linguistic unit of a short-vowel sound, to describe a scripture or incantation. The Udasis consider the matra composition of Sri Chand to be equal in-power to Guru Nanak's Japji Sahib composition. Sri Chand was an avid scholar and author, producting texts such as the Arta Srī Guru Nānak Dev, which is about his father Guru Nanak. He also composed works on Indic deities, on sacred names of the divine, and other devotional and philosophical works. An Udasi saint and direct descendant of Guru Nanak named Sukhbasi Ram Bedi (1758–1848) was responsible for authoring literary work in verse titled Guru Nanak Bans Prakash documenting the life of Guru Nanak and his descendants. Their work Udasi Bodh explains their origin, history, philosophy, and mythos. Some of the texts used in their daily worship practice include the Udasi-Satotar or the Panch-Parameshar. A matra attributed to Balu Hasna is also recorded and revered by them. Anand Ghan was an Udasi scholar active in the late 18th and early 19th century who authored Vedantic-influenced commentaries on the Guru Granth Sahib. The Akali movement and explusion of Udasi mahants from gurdwaras led to the destruction of some Udasi-related manuscripts and works.

== Distribution ==
Today's Udasi are predominantly located in northwestern India, especially around Punjab, Haryana, Gujarat, and cities like Haridwar and New Delhi; they are divided into two major organizations:

- Udasin Panchayati Bada Akhara
- Udasin Panchayati Naya Akhara

Udasis historically were found across the Indian subcontinent, including to the south and east. They were found in the Deccan as well. However, most of their centres were based in northwestern India, especially in Punjab.

=== In Pothohar ===
According to Zulfiqar Ali Kalharo, the Udasis were active in the Pothohar region of northern Punjab. The Udasis saints ot Pothohar would meditate in caves (such as at Katas Raj or Tila Jogian), where they performed tapas. Many samadhis and shrines of Udasi ascetics can be found in the region. Baba Mohan Das is a prominent Udasi saint of the region, venerated in the Rawalpindi district by both Sikhs and Hindus, with his shrine located in Gujar Khan Tehsil.

=== In Sindh ===
Sindh has a large number of people who may be best described as Udasis. The area of northern Sindh was especially influenced by Udasipanth. The Udasi temples of Sindh are known as darbars. It is said that Sri Chand himself visited Thatta in Sindh, where a darbar commemorates his stay. Sri Chand travelled to Sindh in the second half of the 16th century during the reign of the Tarkhan dynasty. He established a dhuni (campfire) at Rohri and another at Faqir Jo Goth, the latter of which is around 5 kilometres from Thatta.

After the passing of Gurditta, the second Udasi leader, the leadership passed to four preachers, with Bhai Almast being one of these four. Almast travelled to Sindh, where he conducted missionary activities and successfully converted many Sindhis to the Udasipanth. His place of residence was at Rohri, at the dhuni established by Sri Chand. Those newly converted appended Ram or Das to the end of their names. The mahants (who appended the prefix Bava or Bao, meaning "ascetic" at the beginning of their names and refer to their title of leadership as Gadhisar) of the Baba Sri Chand Darbar (colloquially known as Raj Ghaat) in Faqir Jo Goth, such as the first mahant, Bava Balkram Das, conducted missionary activities in the area and faraway (even as distant as Nepal) as did his successors. His two successors, Bava Pooran Das and Bava Lachman Das, were not only missionaries but also masters at hatha yoga. Sikhism became popularised in Sindh due to the missionary works of these Udasi saints. Udasi temples in Sindh typically houses both the Guru Granth Sahib as well images of various Hindu deities. There is said to be an Udasi temple dedicated to a saint in every town and city of Sindh. During the reign of the Talpur Mirs of Khairpur (1783–1955), many Udasi darbars were constructed and Udasi saints were accepted to settle in the state.

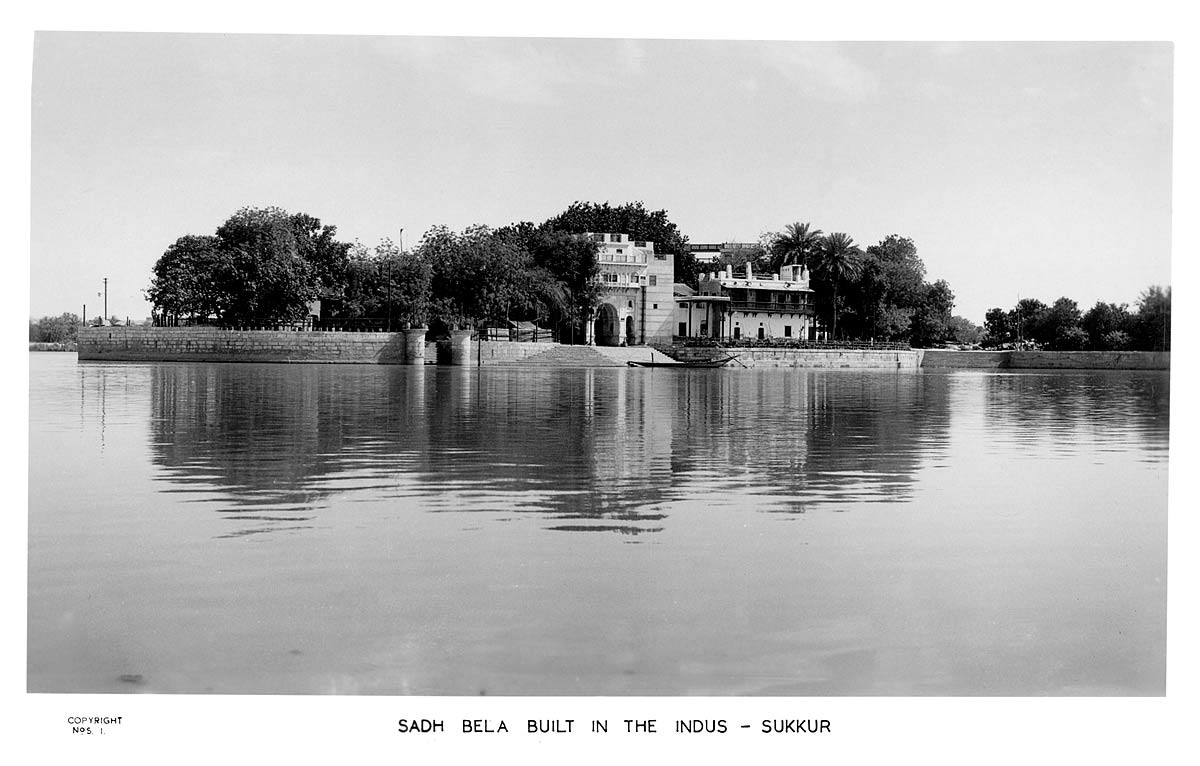
Photograph of the Sadh Belo complex in Sindh, ca.1940

A darbar at Godhu Shah in Khairpur (known as the Godhu Shah Darbar, Nanga Darbar, or Gurpota Darbar) is believed to have been founded by a grandson of one of the Sikh gurus (Gurpota) whom became an Udasi under the guidance of a mahant, it is associated with the Nanga sect of Udasis. Another Udasi saint who spread the faith in Sindh was Rai Sahib Gokal Singh, who established a darbar in Gokalpur Kot in Garhi Yashin. Baba Wasti Ram, an Udasi saint, established a darbar in Garhi Yasin town. Baba Wasti Ram and his successors, Baba Khushi Ram Sahib (a talented mystic), Baba Agya Ram (established a darbar in Aurangabad village), and Baba Piyara Ram (established in a darbar in Maari village), spread the Udasi teachings in the Shikarpur area. One prominent Udasi saint, Bankhandi, originally from either Nepal or near Delhi, was the founder of Sadh Belo in Sukkur, Sindh in 1823.

In recent times, veneration of the folk deity Jhulelal has crept into the practices of Udasi darbars in Sindh. The liberal attitude of Sindhi Muslims may have helped the Udasis take root in Sindh rather than being pushed out on the basis of religious intolerance and persecution.

The most well-known Udasi darbars of Sindh are:

- Baba Bankhandi Darbar at Sadh Belo, Sukkur
- Baba Sarup Das Darbar (alias Halani Darbar) at Naushero Feroz
- Khushi Ram Darbar at Rohri
- Samad Udasin at Shikarpur
- Chhat Darbar at Shikarpur
- Wadi Darbar at Pir Jo Goth
- Jumna Das Darbar

=== In Bengal ===
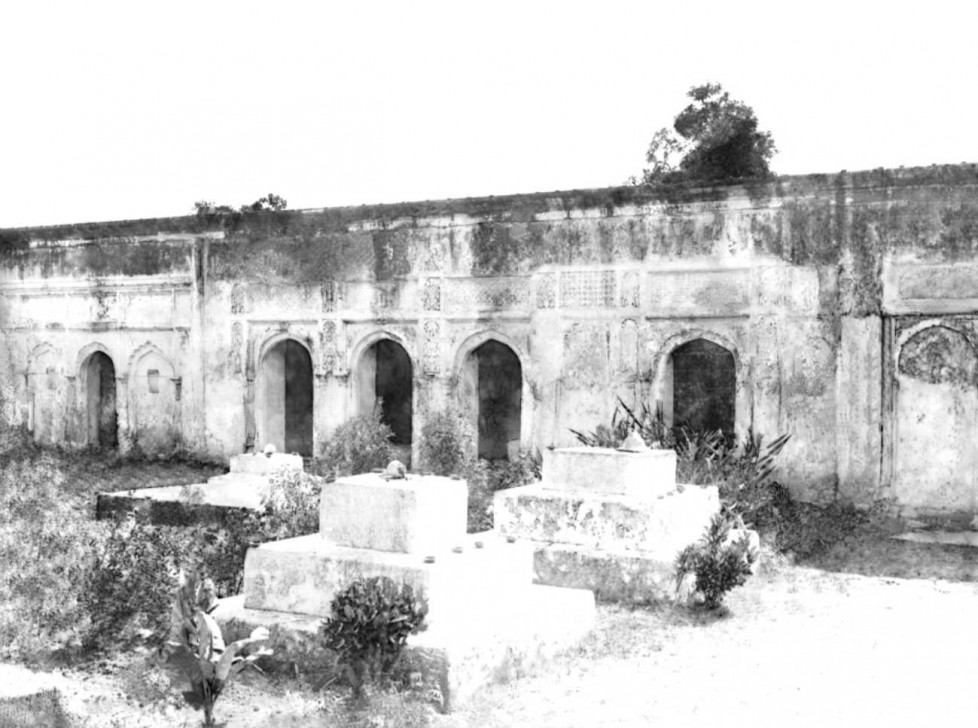
Photograph of samadhs at the rear of Gurdwara Nanak Shahi, 1950. The gurdwara's establishment is traced to Udasis.

There are claims of Baba Gurditta visiting Bengal, where he established a manji in Shujatpur (presently the campus of University of Dhaka) which Gurditta traced to be the location in which Nanak resided during his stay in Bengal. During the reign of Mughal emperor Jahangir, Guru Hargobind dispatched Bhai Natha (Bhai Almast's successor) to Bengal, who dug another well and also laid the foundation stone for the Shujatpur Sikh Sangat, a religious congregation. Dalbir Singh Dhillon claims that the sixth guru had dispatched Bhai Almast to conduct missionary work in Bengal, whose original work was carried-on by Bhai Natha by the time of the ninth Sikh guru, Tegh Bahadur. Sangat Shutrashasi was a temple that belonged to the Suthrashahi sub-sect of the Udasi sect which was once located in Urdu Bazaar, but the Suthrashahi sadhus later destroyed it themselves.

== Leaders ==
The Udasis nominally claim to be followers of the Sikh gurus from Guru Nanak to Guru Gobind Singh. However, they also profess faith in Sri Chand's lineage down to their living mahants of which-ever branch, centre, or Udasi sub-sect they are affiliated to. They maintain their own parallel line of gurus from Guru Nanak, followed by Sri Chand, followed by Gurditta. According to Sulakhan Singh, the Udasi guruship lineage asserts that Baba Gurditta was the successor of Guru Hargobind, with Gurditta after annointing Guru Har Rai as his successor, with Gurditta being the intermediary guru between Hargobind and Har Rai. This differs from the mainstream Sikh guruship lineage, who believe Guru Har Rai was the immediate successor of Guru Hargobind. Furthermore, the Udasis believe that four preachers, named the Adi-Udasis, succeeded Baba Gurditta sometime in the first half of the 17th century, who each established their own dhuan. Their leadership lineages start from Guru Nanak and end with their living mahants.

No.	Name (Birth–Death)	Portrait	Term	Reference(s)
1.	Sri Chand (1494 – 1629)		1494 – 1629	
2.	Baba Gurditta (1613 – 1638)		1629 – 1638	
3.	The four Adi-Udasis, namely Almast, Bālū Husnā, Goind, and Phūl, (four chief preachers appointed by Baba Gurditta for four new monastic seats)		1637 – various	

== Demographics ==
From the 1790s to the 1840s during Sikh-rule, the popularity of the Udasis increased. In the 1891 Census of British India, 10,518 Hindus and 1,165 Sikhs returned themselves as Udasis. There are no current statistics for their population count.

== Gallery ==
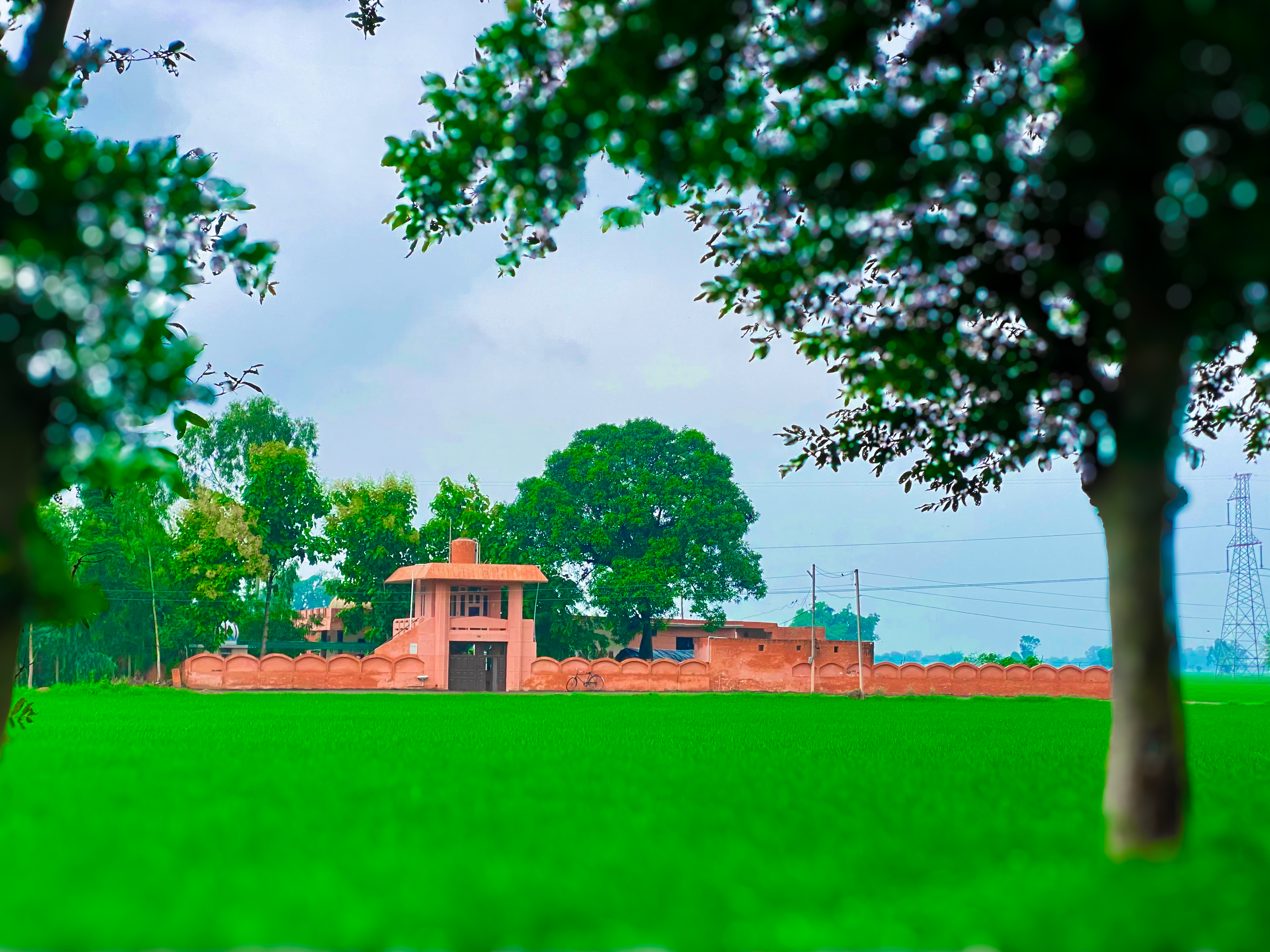
Udasin Ashram, Lachkani

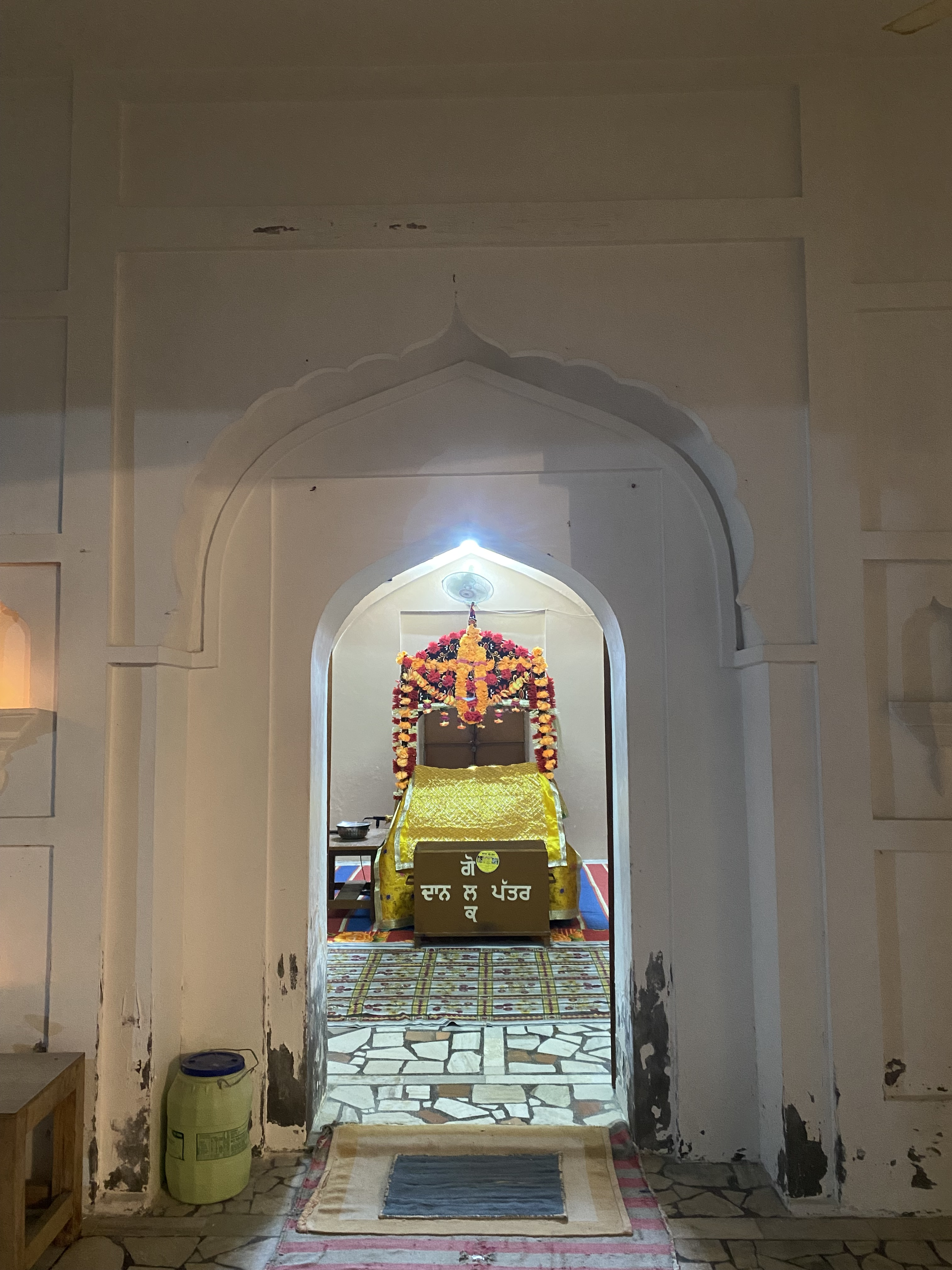
Udasin Ashram, Sherkhan Wala

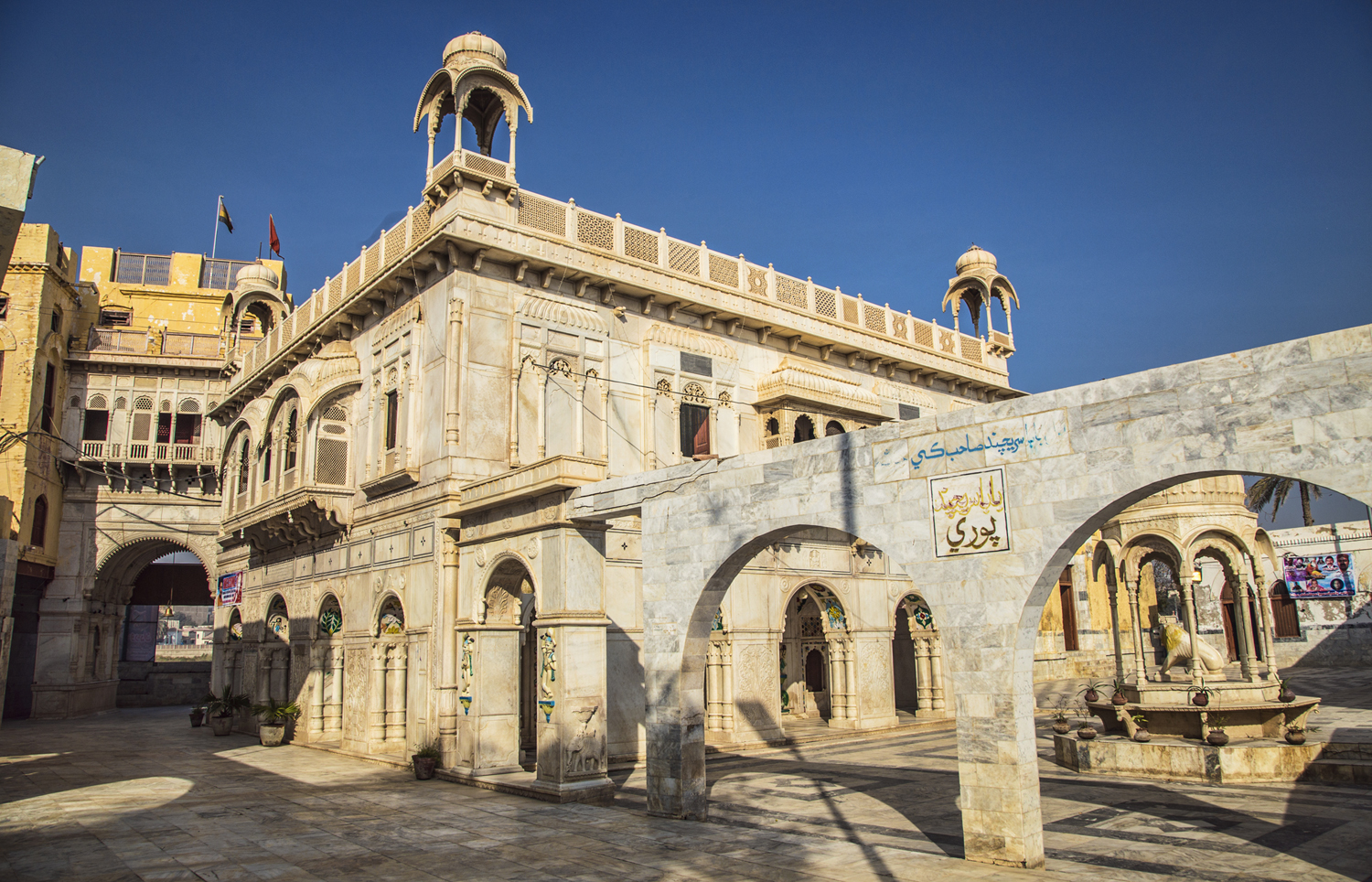
Sadh Belo

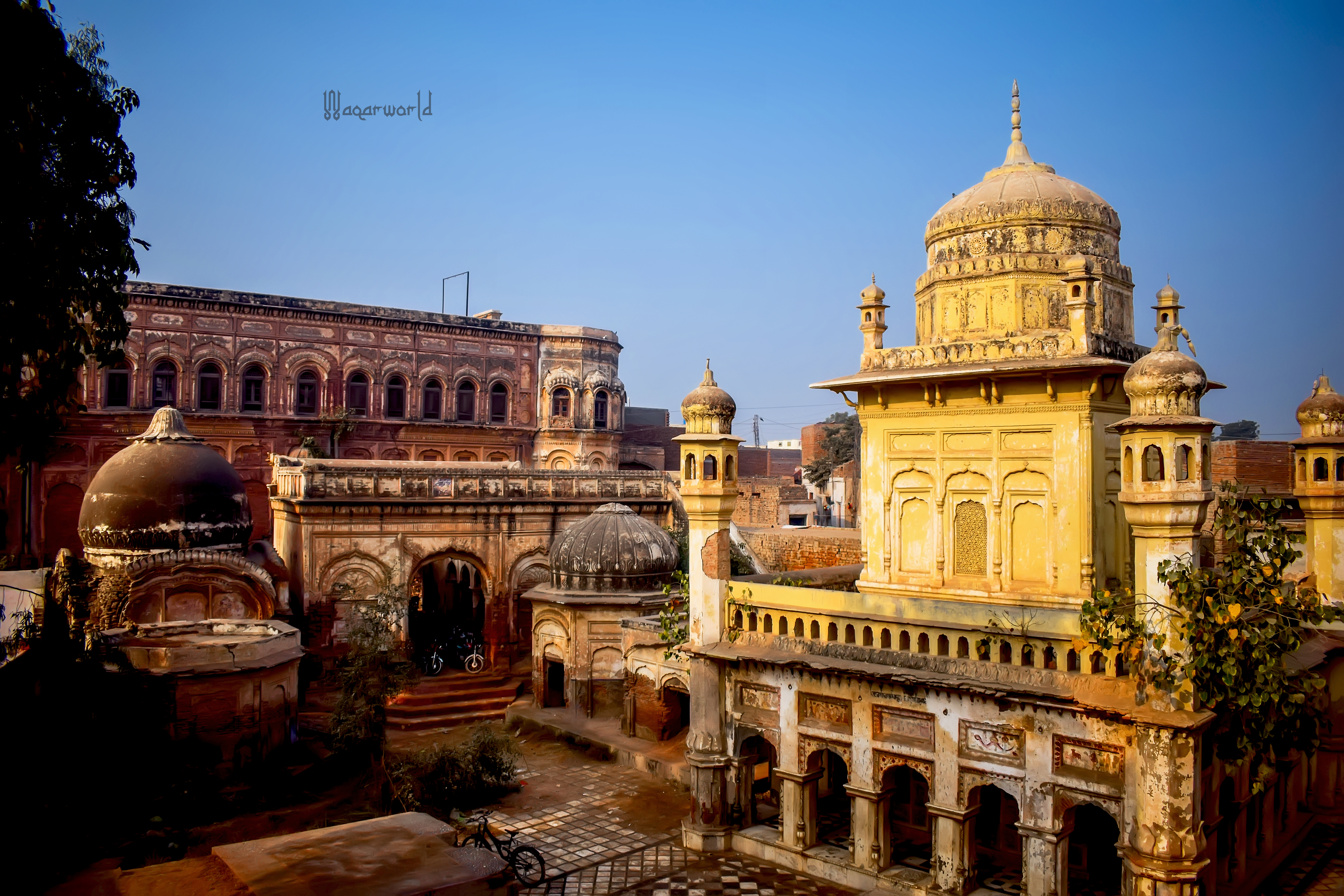
Abandoned Udasi site of the Dera of Bhumman Shah in Punjab, Pakistan

== See also ==
- Dhanadeva – an ancient inscription found in an Udasi shrine
- Sects of Sikhism
- Sects of Hinduism
- Sadh Belo
- Sri Chand Darbar
