= Udasin Panchayati Naya Akhara =

Religious organization

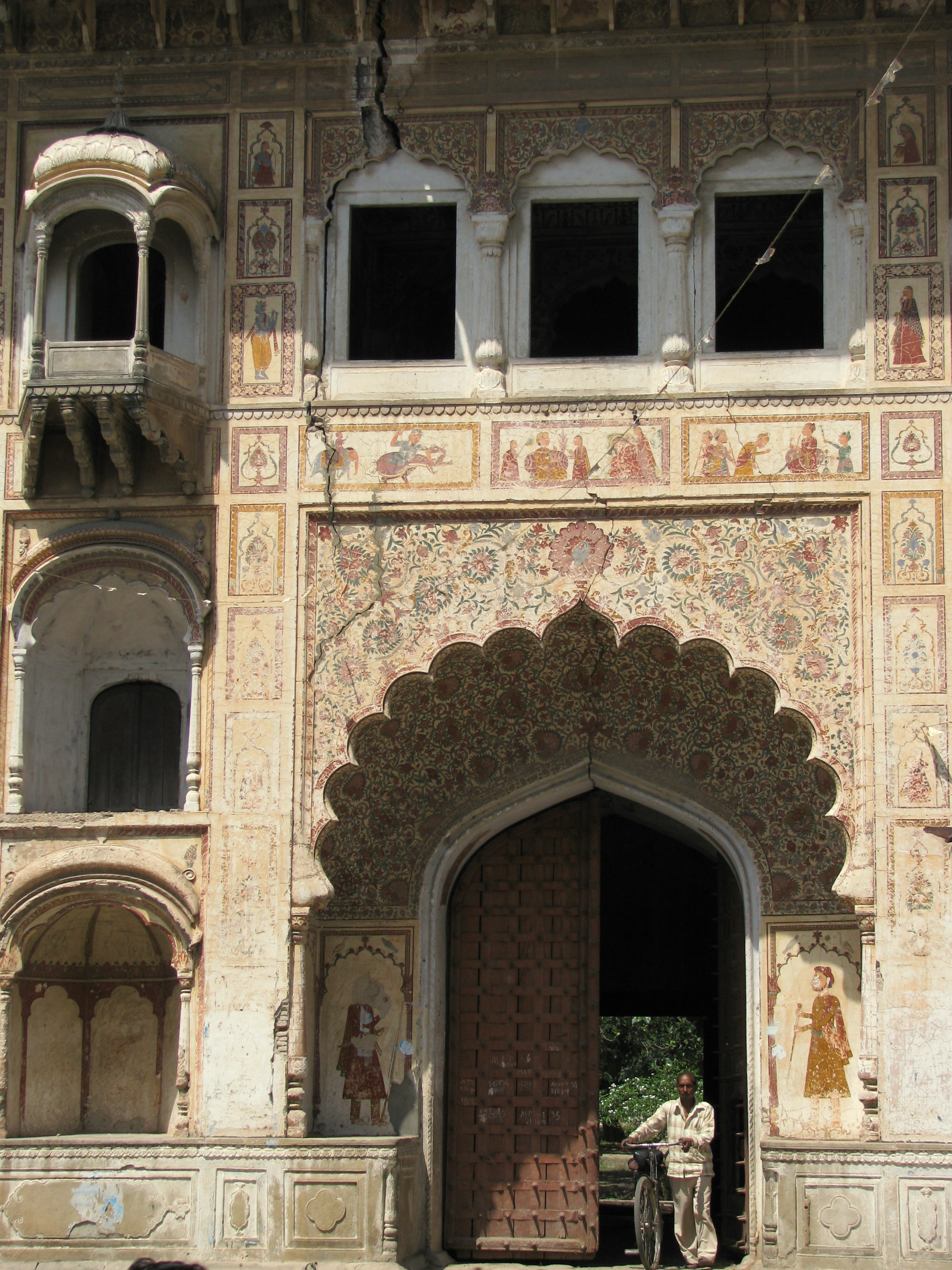
- Front facade of Naya Udasin Akhara, Kankhal
- Formation: 1846
- Founder: Mahant Sudhir Das
- Headquarters: W4HX+HMG, Daksha Mandir Rd, Mohallla Miaria, Mayapur, Haridwar, Uttarakhand 249408, India
- Head Mahant: Mahant Jagtar Muni
- Parent organization: Akhil Bharatiya Akhara Parishad
- Website: udasinpanchayatinayaakhara.com

The Udasin Panchayati Naya Akhara or Panchayati Naya Udasin Akhara is one of two Udasi akharas that participate in the Kumbh. It was founded by Mahant Sudhir Das in 1846 as a splinter movement of the earlier bada akhara (Udasin Panchayati Bada Akhara) due to an internal dispute. (Note: The akhara is also known as the 'Sri Gur Naya Akhara Udasin' or 'Udasian da Chhota Akhara'.) The word naya means "new". They are Sanatan Sikhs who share many beliefs and practices with the bada akhara, being followers of Sri Chand, who the group calls Guru Chandracharya. The organization is based in Kankhal, Uttarakhand. A unique quirk of the akhara is that its entry processions have no acharya, no palanquin and no spears or arms. The organization is governed by a Shree Panch council. The current head of the group is Mahant Jagtar Muni. The organization carries out charitable activities related to religion, hunger, accommodation, health, and education.
