= Uppal Khalsa, Jalandhar =

Uppal Khalsa
- Village
- Location in Punjab, India Uppal Khalsa (India)
- Coordinates: 31.0959476°N 75.5535776°E
- Country: India
- State: Punjab
- District: Jalandhar

Government
  - Type: Panchayat raj
  - Body: Gram panchayat
- Elevation: 240 m (790 ft)

Population (2011)
  - Total: 1,476
- Sex ratio 769/707 ♂/♀

Languages
  - Official: Punjabi
- Time zone: UTC+5:30 (IST)
- PIN: 144039
- Telephone: 01821
- ISO 3166 code: IN-PB
- Vehicle registration: PB- 08
- Posta office: Nurmahal
- Website: jalandhar.nic.in

Uppal Khalsa is a village in Jalandhar district of Punjab State, India. It is located 3 km from postal head office in Nurmahal, 25 km from Phillaur, 32 km from district headquarter Jalandhar and 146 km from state capital Chandigarh. The village is administrated by a sarpanch, who is an elected representative.

== Demography ==
As of 2011, The village has a total number of 329 houses and population of 1476 of which include 769 are males while 707 are females according to the report published by Census India in 2011. Literacy rate of the village is 77.62%, higher than state average of 75.84%. The population of children under the age of 6 years is 329 which is 9.49% of total population of the village, and child sex ratio is approximately 944 higher than the state average of 846.

Most of the people are from Schedule Caste which constitutes 40.24% of total population in the village. The town does not have any Schedule Tribe population so far.

As per census 2011, 504 people were engaged in work activities out of the total population of the village which includes 437 males and 67 females. According to census survey report 2011, 93.06% workers describe their work as main work and 9.94% workers are involved in marginal activity providing livelihood for less than 6 months.

== Transport ==
Nurmahal railway station is the nearest train station however, Phillaur Junction train station is 24.5 km away from the village. The village is 53.5 km away from domestic airport in Ludhiana and the nearest international airport is located in Chandigarh also Sri Guru Ram Dass Jee International Airport is the second nearest airport which is 122 km away in Amritsar.
