= Uppal Jagir, Jalandhar =

Uppal Jagir jaure uppala
- village
- Location in Punjab, India Uppal Jagir (India)
- Coordinates: 31.0793461°N 75.5848432°E
- Country: India
- State: Punjab
- District: Jalandhar

Population (2011)
  - Total: 6,421

Languages
  - Official: Punjabi
- Time zone: UTC+5:30 (IST)
- PIN: 144039
- Telephone code: 01826
- Vehicle registration: PB- 08
- Coastline: 0 kilometres (0 mi)
- Nearest city: nurmahal
- Avg. summer temperature: 47 °C (117 °F)
- Avg. winter temperature: 3 °C (37 °F)

Uppal Jagir and Uppal khalsa are villages in the tehsil of Phillaur, near Nurmahal, Jalandhar district, in Punjab, India.

== Demographics ==
According to the 2011 Census, Uppal Jagir and Uppal Khalsa have a population of 6,421 people. Neighbouring villages include Bohara, Dalla, Bhandal Sahib Rai and Kandola Kala Jalandhar.

== History ==
According to local tradition, Uppal Jagir and Uppal Khalsa were settled over 250 years ago. Both villages are called "Jorhey" (twin)Uppalla as many residents share the Uppal surname.
