= Raman Uppal =

Canadian and British economist and academic

Academic background
- Education: B.A., Economics; M.A., Finance; Ph.D., Finance
- Alma mater: University of Delhi; University of Pennsylvania

Academic work
- Institutions: EDHEC Business School

Raman Uppal is a Canadian and British economist and academic. He is a professor of finance at the EDHEC Business School in London.

Uppal's research has focused on finance, asset pricing, portfolio selection, and incomplete markets. His works have been published in academic journals such as the American Economic Review, The Journal of Finance, and The Review of Financial Studies.

== Education ==
Uppal earned his B.A. in Economics from the University of Delhi (St. Stephen's College) in 1983, followed by an M.A. in Finance from the University of Pennsylvania in 1986. He went on to receive his M.B.A. in 1988 and his Ph.D. in Finance from the same university in 1989.

== Career ==
Uppal began his academic career in 1988 as an assistant professor at the University of British Columbia. He held this position until 1992, when he was appointed the B.I. Ghert Family Foundation Junior Professor, a role he held until 1995. He then served as an associate professor at the same university until 2000. That year, he joined the London Business School as an associate professor, later becoming Professor of Finance from 2002 to 2011. Since 2011, he has been Professor of Finance at EDHEC Business School in London.

Uppal has also held various administrative and professional appointments throughout his career. Between 2002 and 2005, he was the co-director of the Financial Economics Programme of CEPR, and between 2011 and 2014, he was the Director of the American Finance Association. Moreover, since 2023, he has been a Consultant for the Bank of England.
