= Dhuni =

Object in the Indian religions

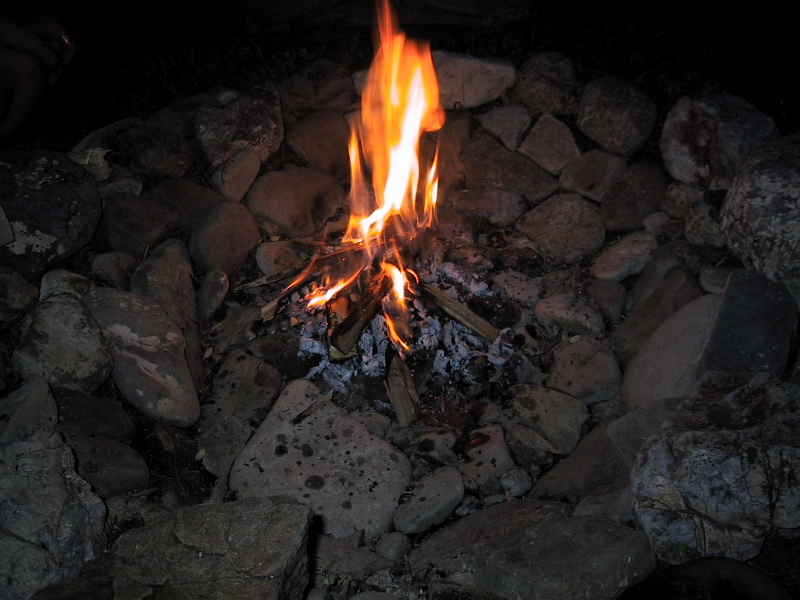
Nagaloka Dhuni at The Sanctuary at Two Rivers, Costa Rica

A dhuni is (according to the Indian religions such as Hinduism, Buddhism, Jainism, etc.) a sacred site in the ground or a handheld burner typically made of clay or brass. It is a process of using the element of fire to cleanse negativities in one's spiritual subtle system and the environment.

The dhuni (or dhunga) is also a term used in Indian cuisine to describe the process of cooking food by placing smoking charcoal into the finished dish.

== Honoring the dhuni ==
Sitting by the dhuni is believed to "purify one's vibrations" and to have beneficial impact on physical and mental health.

== See also ==
- Homa (ritual)
- Dhupa
