= Akhara (disambiguation) =

Akhara is an organization of the different sects of sadhu, Vairaghi, yogi or Hindu renunciates.

Akhara may also refer to:

- Akhara (album), the third album released by Punjabi Bhangra artist Kulwinder Dhillon
- Akhara, Bhogpur, a village in Punjab, India
- Akhada, a school for Indian wrestling
- Akhada (book), the autobiography of the Indian wrestling coach Mahavir Singh Phogat

== See also ==
- Akhil Bharatiya Akhara Parishad
- Nirmohi Akhara
- Shri Dattatreya Akhara
- Guru Hanuman Akhara
- Nashipur Akhara
