= Bairagi =

Bairagi or Vairagi may refer to:

- Vairagya, asceticism in Indian religions
  - Sannyasa, renunciation in Hinduism
    - Vairagi tradition, celibate ascetics in the Vaishnava sect of Hinduism
      - Bairagi (caste), a section of Hindus Brahmins
  - Bairagi (ascetics), a generic term for Hindu ascetics
  - Swami, a term for Hindu ascetics, also a surname of the Bairagi caste
- Bairagi (raga), an Indian classical raga

People

- Bairagi Jena, Indian politician, a Member of Parliament from Odisha
- Bairagi Dwibedy, Indian politician, a Member of Parliament from Odisha
- Banda Bairagi or Banda Singh, name of the Sikh warrior when he was a vairagi
- Balkavi Bairagi, Indian poet and lyricist in Hindi and Malvi
- Chand Ram Bairagi, Indian athlete
- Hathiram Bhavaji, a Hindu devotee at Tirupati, India
- Nanua Bairagi, Indian mystic
- Ram Prasad Bairagi, Indian freedom fighter

== See also ==
- Vairagyam, 1987 Indian film directed by K. Vijayan
- Vairagya Shatakam, a work of Sanskrit poetry from ancient India
- Lohgarh, Banda Bairagi, capital of Banda Bairagi or Banda Singh
- Bairagia, a village in Bhola District of Bangladesh
