= Akhara =

Place of practice for Indian martial artists

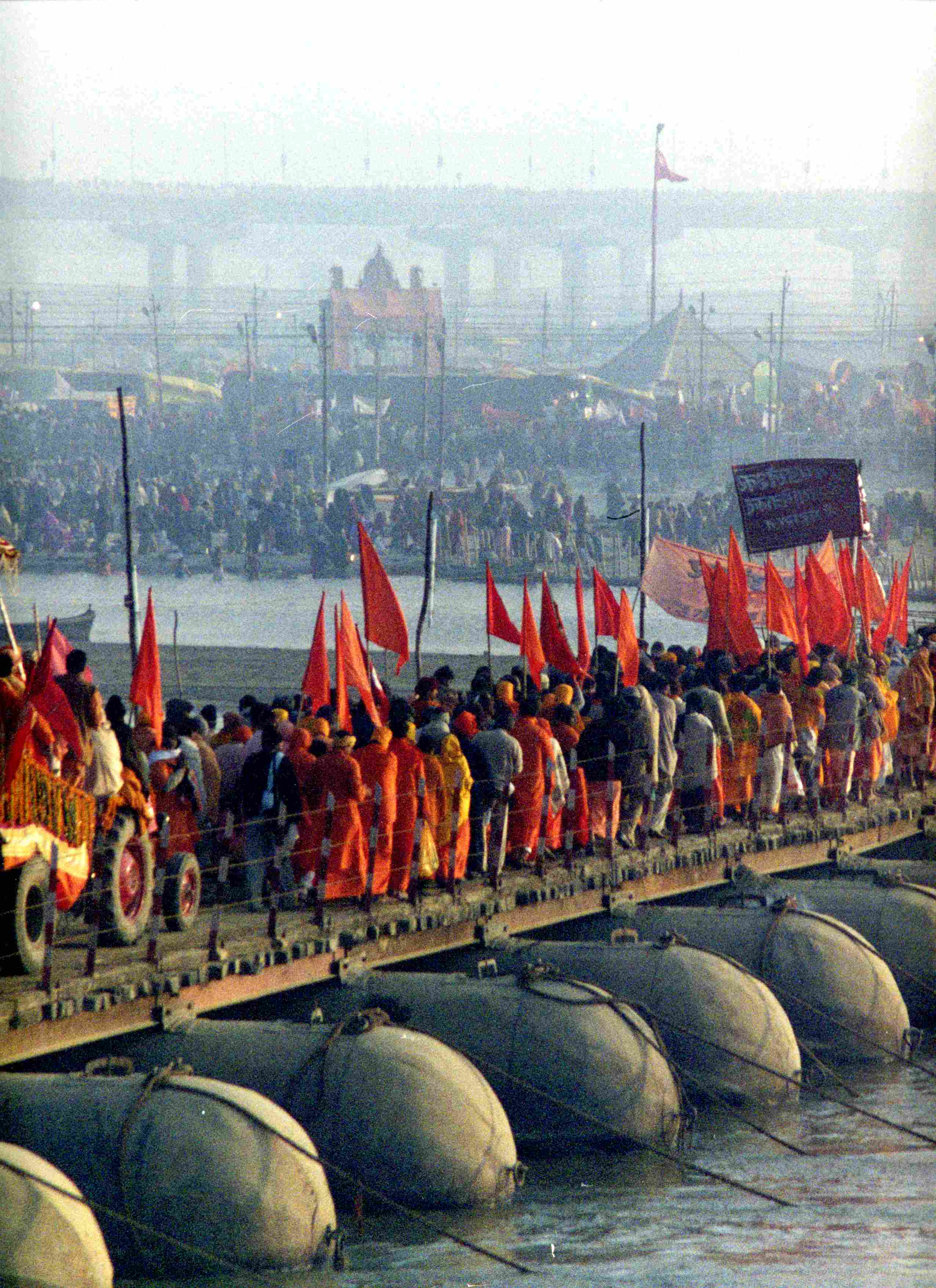
A ceremonial procession of akhara marching over a makeshift bridge over the Ganges river, during Kumbha Mela at Prayagraj, 2001

Akhara or Akhada (Hindi: अखाड़ा, romanised: Akhāṛā) is an Indian word for a place of practice with facilities for boarding, lodging and training, both in the context of Indian martial artists or a sampradaya monastery for religious renunciates in Guru–shishya tradition. For example, in the context of the Dashanami Sampradaya sect, the word denotes both martial arts and religious monastic aspects of the trident-wielding martial regiment of the renouncing sadhus.

== Etymology ==
The term akhara, is a gender-egalitarian term, which means the circle or more precisely the spiritual core, congregation or league, it is similar to the Greek-origin word academy and the English word school, can be used to mean both a physical institution or a group of them which share a common lineage or are under a single leadership, such as the school of monastic thought or the school of martial arts. Unlike the gurukul in which students live and study at the home of a guru, members of an akhara although train under a guru but they do not live a domestic life. Some strictly practice Brahmacharya (celibacy) and others may require complete renunciation of worldly life. For example, wrestlers are expected to live a pure life while living at akhara with other fellow wrestlers, refraining from sex and owning few material possessions.

In some languages such as Odia the word is officially transcribed as akhada, by way of rendering the flapped [ɽ] sound as a d. The Haryanvi and Khari Boli dialects shorten this to khada (खाड़ा).

== History ==
The historic Jarasandha's Akhara at Rajgir, mentioned in the Mahabharata.

=== Foundation dates of martial akharas ===
Jadunath Sarkar documented the founding date of various akharas based on a 19th century manuscript provided to him by the Nirvani Akhara of Dashanami Sampradaya.

- Shavite martial akharas: Dashanami Sampradaya has 10 akharas, 6 of which are ancient akharas. The manuscript cited by Sarkar details the genealogy of head of 6 akharas. According to this manuscript, the six military akharas were founded in the following years, Dashanami military kharas had prohibition against eating meat or taking of narcotics:
1. 547 CE, Avahan Akhara
2. 646 CE, Atal Akhara
3. 749 CE, Nirvani Akhara
4. 904 CE, Niranjani Akhara
5. 1146 CE, Juna Akhara which was originally called "Bhairavi Akhara"
6. 1856 CE, Anand Akhara

- Vaishnavite akharas: Followers of Vaishnavism are also called Bairagi or Vairagi. Among the Bairagi, those who became part of the military akharas were organised in the 7 akharas founding dates of most of which are unclear. Each of the akhara accepted members from all 4 sects of Vaishnavism. Bairagi military akharas generally did not follow the prohibition against eating meat or taking of narcotics. Vaishnavism has following four major sects and 7 martial akharas:
  - subsects or paramparas
    - Sri founded by Ramananda
    - Brahma founded by Madhava
    - Rudra founded by Vishnusuvamin
    - Sanakadi founded by Nimbarka
  - Martial akharas - total 7:
1. Dadupanthis: Armed martial akharas were first likely formed by the Dadupantji guru Jait Sahib (1693–1734 CE) when he recruited armed Naga sadhus. In 1733, Dadupanthis were tax-paying farmers in Jaipur State and martial naga sadhus used employed to enforce the payment of taxes. In 1793, Dadupanthis and Jaipur State had an agreement under which Dadhupanthis provided 5000 armed soldier sadhus to defend the Jaipur State. During the Indian Rebellion of 1857, Dadupanthis acted as auxiliaries who assisted the East India Company forces.
2. Satnami martial akhara: Satnamis are an offshoot/subsect of Ravidassia sect which in turn is a Ramanandi Sampradaya of Vaishnavism founded by the 14th century sadhu called Ramananda. Satnami revolt was a major rebellion against Aurangzeb, the Mughal Emperor, occurred in Narnaul and surrounding localities in the year 1672. The revolt was caused by the oppression led by the revenue officials of the Mughal Emperor. A large reinforcement was sent to contain the revolt and in the following battle thousands of Hindu Satnamis were killed. Satnamis revolted against the rule of mughal king Aurangzeb.
3. Sikh's martial akharas: Khalsa armed akharas were formed by Guru Govind Singh in 1699 against the Mughal Empire, most notably against Aurangzeb. Banda Singh Bahadur, also called Banda Bairagi, who fought against Mughals was originally a Vaisnavite Bairagi. Udasi are a Sikh martial akhara.

=== Historical timeline ===
In its earliest usage, akhara referred to training halls for professional fighters. Govind Sadashiv Ghurye translates the term as "military regiment". Ancient use of the word can be found in the Mahabharata (c. 400 BCE text describing 900 BCE era) epic which mentions Jarasandha's Akhara at Rajgir. Legendary figures like Parashurama and Agastya are credited as the founders of the early martial akhara in certain regions of India.

Svinth (2002) traces press ups and squats used by South Asian wrestlers to the pre-classical era. Many of the popular sports mentioned in the Vedas and the epics have their origins in military training, such as boxing (musti-yuddha), wrestling (maladwandwa), chariot-racing (rathachalan), horse-riding (aswa-rohana) and archery (dhanurvidya).

When the 8th-century philosopher Adi Shankaracharya (788–820 CE) founded the Dashanami Sampradaya, he divided the ascetics into two categories: Shastradhari (Sanskrit: शास्त्रधारी, lit. scripture-bearers) intelligentsia and Astradhari (Sanskrit: अस्त्रधारी, lit. weapon-bearers) warriors. Shankaracharya established Naga sadhus as an astradhari armed order. He also popularised the Char Dhams during the reign of Katyuri dynasty of Garhwal Kingdom.

In 904 CE and 1146 CE, Niranjani Akhara and Juna Akhara were founded respectively.

In 1567 CE, Jogis (Giris) and Sannyasi (Puris) battled each other as detailed in the Tabaqat-i-Akbari, both are 2 of the 10 orders of Dashanami Akhara. Puris were outnumbered by 200 to 500 by Jogis, Akbar asked his soldiers to smear ash and join Puris to help them, this led to the victory of Puris,

In 1657/1672 CE, Satnami revellion against Aurangzeb's persecution of Non-Muslims.

In 1664 CE, Dashanami Akhara possibly battled Aurangzeb.

In 1690 CE and 1760 CE, Akharas of Saivites and Vaishnava sects fought each other at Nashik mela (60,000 died) and Haridwar mela (1,800 died).

In 1770-1820 CE, during Sannyasi rebellion against Company rule in India, Akharas played a key role specially the Dashanami akhara.

In 1780 CE, the East India Company administration establish the sequence of order of procession for royal bathing by the akharas at Kumbh Mela to eliminate disputes.

In 2018, the Kinnar Akhara was established by the hijra(transgender) community. It is under the Juna Akhada (Shri Panchdashnaam Juna Akhada).

Today, akhara may be used for religious purposes or for the teaching of yoga and martial arts. Some of the noted Akhara organisations include Akhil Bharatiya Akhara Parishad (All India Akhara Council), Nirmohi Akhara, and Shri Dattatreya Akhara.

== Akharas within Guru–Shishya traditional Sampradaya-Paramparas ==
Sampradaya is a particular system of belief and within it a particular guru's lineage is called parampara. There are 3 distinct belief-system Sampradayas (Vaishnava, Shaivite and Dashanami sampradaya), each of which follows one of 3 types of Guru–shishya parampara lineage (Deva, Rishi and Manav parampara), each sampradaya-parampara may have several akharas of shastradhari (intellectuals) or astradhari (warriors), and larger akharas may have own one or more permanent mathas.

Sampradaya (Sanskrit : सम्प्रदाय IAST sampradāya) translated as ‘tradition’, 'spiritual lineage' or a ‘religious system’. (Note: The word commands much more respect and power in the Indian context than its translations in English does.) It relates to a succession of masters and disciples, which serves as a spiritual channel, and provides a delicate network of relationships that lends stability to a religious identity. Sampradaya is a body of practice, views and attitudes, which are transmitted, redefined and reviewed by each successive generation of followers. A particular guru lineage is called parampara. By receiving diksha (initiation) into the guru–shishya traditional parampara of a living guru, one belongs to its proper sampradaya. One cannot become a member by birth, as is the case with gotra, a seminal, or hereditary, dynasty. In the traditional residential form of education, the shishya remains with his or her guru as a family member and gets the education as a true learner. In some traditions there is never more than one active master at the same time in the same guruparamaparya (lineage).

Sampradaya: three sampradayas are Vaishnava, Shavite and Advait

- Vaishnava sampradaya: has 4 major Guru–shishya traditional paramparas
  - Sri Sampradaya parampara of guru Ramanujacharya,
  - Madhva Sampradaya parampara of guru Madhvacharya,
  - Rudra Sampradaya parampara of guru Viṣṇusvāmī/Vallabhacharya
  - Kumara sampradaya parampara of guru Nimbarka

- Shaivite sampradaya: has 6 major Guru–shishya traditional paramparas
  - Nandinatha Sampradaya parampara of guru Tirumular (now known as Siddha Sampradaya of Shaiva Siddhanta)
  - Meykandar Sampradaya parampara of guru Meykandar (now known as Saiva Adheenams of Shaiva Siddhanta in South India)
  - Adinath Sampradaya parampara of guru Matsyendranath and Gorakshanath (now known as Nath Sampradaya of Siddha Siddhanta)
  - Trika Sampradaya (also known as Ragasya Sampradaya and Trayambaka Sampradaya) parampara of guru Durvasa and Vasugupta who follow Kashmir Shaivism
  - Lingayat Sampradaya parampara
  - Srouta Sampradaya parampara

- Advaita Sampradaya (also known as Ekadandis, currently known as Dashanami Sampradaya): After the decline of Buddhism, a section of the Ekadandis were organised by Adi Shankara in the 8th century in India to be associated with four maṭhas paramparas to provide a base for the growth of Hinduism. Dashanami Sampradaya, "Tradition of Ten Names", is a Hindu monastic tradition of Ekadandi sannyasins (wandering renunciates carrying a single staff) generally associated with the Advaita Vedanta tradition.
  - Bhogavala parampara of guru Padmapāda at Govardhana Pīṭhaṃ (Puri in Odisha)
  - Bhūrivala parampara of guru Sureśvara at Sringeri Śārada Pīṭhaṃ (in Karnataka)
  - Kitavala parampara of guru Hastāmalakācārya at Dvāraka Pīṭhaṃ (Dwaraka in Gujrat)
  - Nandavala parampara of guru Toṭakācārya at Jyotirmaṭha Pīṭhaṃ (Jyotirmath in Uttrakhand)

Paramparās: 3 types (Daiva, Rishi and Manav)

Daiva-paramparā
- Nārāyaṇa
- Sada Shiva
- Padmabhuva (Brahmā)
Ṛiṣhi-paramparā
- Vaśiṣṭha
- Śakti
- Parāśara
- Vyāsa (Note: the famous redactor of the vedas, he is also traditionally identified with Bādarāyaṇa, the composer of the Brahmasūtras)
- Śuka
Mānava-paramparā
- Gauḍapāda
- Govinda bhagavatpāda
- Śankara bhagavatpāda, and then Shankara's four disciples
  - Padmapāda
  - Hastāmalaka
  - Toṭaka
  - Vārtikakāra (Sureśvara) and others

== Two types of Akhara: Shashtradhari and Astradhari ==
When the 8th-century philosopher Adi Shankaracharya founded the Dashanami Sampradaya, he divided the ascetics into two categories:

- Shastradhari (Sanskrit: शास्त्रधारी, lit. scripture-bearers) intelligentsia.
- Astradhari (Sanskrit: अस्त्रधारी, lit. weapon-bearers) warriors. This refers to the Naga sadhus (a sub-set of Dashanami Sampradaya), an armed order created by Shankaracharya to act as a Hindu army. These weapon-bearing sadhus used to serve as mercenaries and thus were divided into akhara or regiments. Akharas' act of self-defence of turning into armed monasteries of mystics, also led to the unintended consequence of their sectarian fights among themselves turning into violent armed clashes at Kumbh Melas with disastrous consequence including numerous deaths, which diminished only after the East India Company administration limited the warrior role of akharas. Presently, Naga sadhu still carry weapons, but they rarely practice any form of fighting aside from wrestling.

== Astra Martial Arts Akhara ==
Astra (Hindi: अस्त्र), the weapons or martial arts have a long tradition in India. The oldest recorded organised unarmed fighting art in South Asia is malla-yuddha or combat-wrestling, codified into four forms and pre-dating the Vedic Period. Stories describing Krishna report that he sometimes engaged in wrestling matches where he used knee strikes to the chest, punches to the head, hair pulling, and strangleholds. Based on such accounts, Svinth (2002) traces press ups and squats used by South Asian wrestlers to the pre-classical era.

In modern usage, akhara most often denotes a wrestling ground and is typically associated with kushti. For wrestlers, the akhara serves as a training school and an arena in which to compete against each other. The akhara used by wrestlers still have dirt floors to which water, red ochre, buttermilk and oil are added. Aside from wrestling, other fighting systems are also taught and practiced in akhara, which are commonly named after their founder. Indian martial artists may still practice in regional versions of traditional akhara today, but these are often replaced with modern training studios outside India.

=== Dangal ===
While akhara is a place where practicing martial artists lodge and train under a martial art guru, akhara is also usually an arena for the dangal organised among the competing sports person. While living at akhara, pehlwan practice celibacy, stay smoke free and alcohol free and they eat nutrition tradition diet usually rich in milk, ghee, dried nuts and roti. Dangal is Hindi language word which means Sparring or competition in akhara, sometimes called "Chhinj" in Punjabi. Sparring is a form of training common to many combat sports which may vary in its precise form, but it is relatively 'free-form' fighting, with enough rules, customs, or agreements to make injuries unlikely.

=== Langot ===
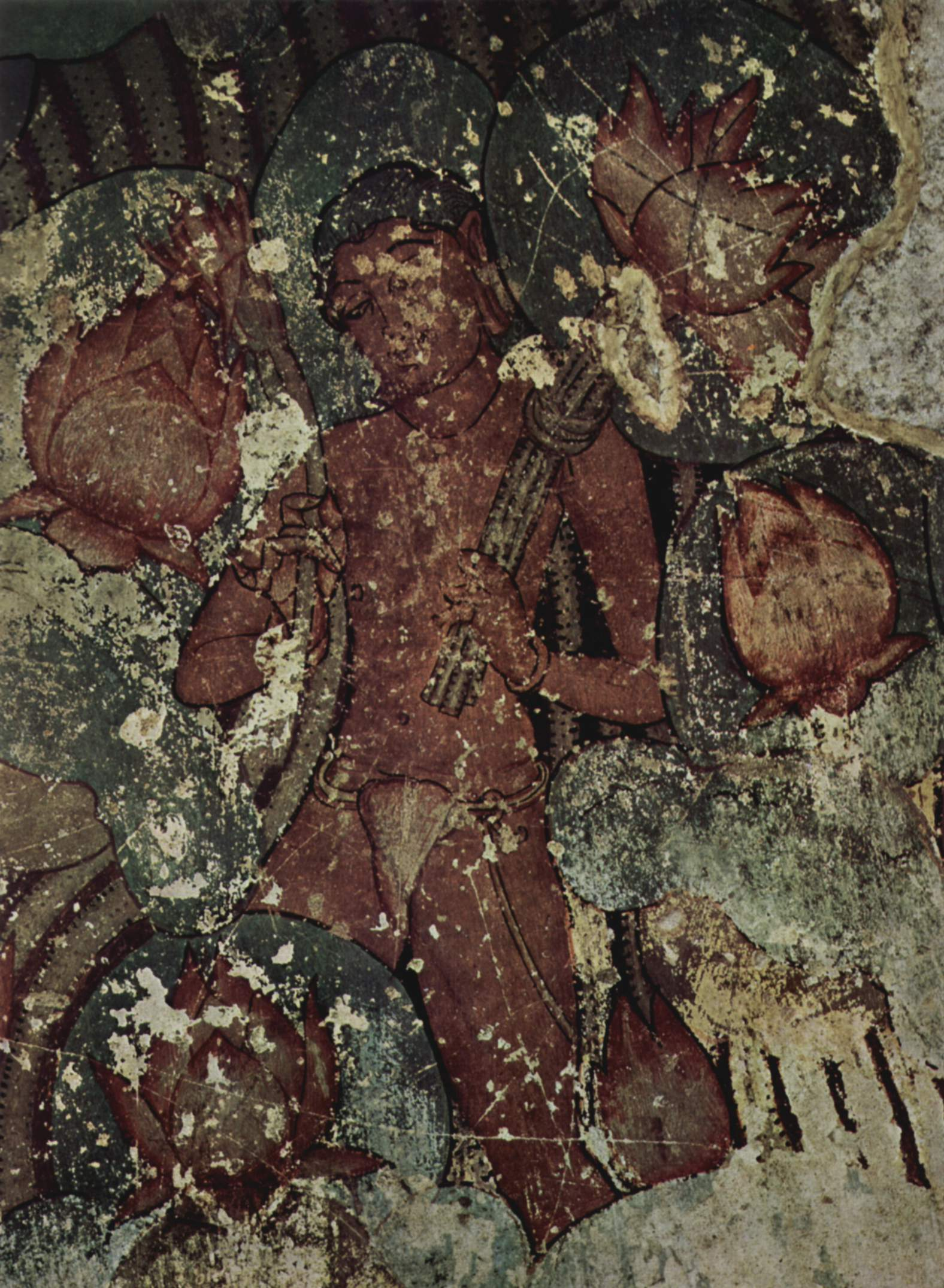
Youth in langota harvesting lotus in pond, 850 CE

Langot (लंगोट) or langota (लंगोटा), also Kaupinam (कौपिनम) or kaupina (कौपिन), is a traditional style of Indian loincloth for men, worn as underwear in dangal held in akharas. It is now mainly used by men when exercising and other intense physical games especially wrestling, to prevent hernias and hydrocele.

Langota, mostly worn by wrestlers, is a sewn undergarment which covers the buttocks and groin. A kaupina, mostly worn by ascetics or by older men in many parts of India, is a similar but unsewn garment that does not cover the buttocks and instead it passes between the buttocks.

=== Major Martial Arts Akharas ===
The major traditional Indian-origin martial arts akhara, mostly focused on wrestling and Pehlwani, by state include:

- Haryana
  In terms of national and international medals, Haryana is India's power house for the power sports due to its culture's focus on hard work, soldiery and sportsmanship.
  - Ch. Bharat Singh Memorial Sports School
    at Nidani village in Jind district.
  - Narayan Akhara & Yog Samiti at Khanda, India
  - Ch. Pratap Singh Memorial Samiti Akhara
    at Kharkhoda.
  - CCHAU Giri Center Akhara for Girls and Boys
    at CCSHAU Giri Center in Hisar.
  - Hindu Public School Akhara for Girls and Boys
    at Chaudhariwas village of Hisar district, in collaboration with Mahavir Phogat.
  - Guru Ganga Ram Akhara
    at Hansi
  - Guru Haripal Akhara
    at Gurgaon, other akharas in the city are at Tripari, Sohna, Nathupur, Daultabad, Badshahpur and Farukhnagar
  - Guru Leelu Akhara,
    at Ladpur in Jhajjar district.
  - Guru Shyam Lal Akhara,
    at Arjangarh village of Gurgaon.
  - Krishan Bhaproda Akhara in Bahadurgarh
  - Hanuman akhara
    at Hisar.
  - Lala Diwanchand Modern Wrestling Centre
    at Chara village in Jhajjar district
  - Mahabir Stadium Akhara for Girls and Boys at Mahabir Stadium in Hisar.
  - Mahavir Singh Phogat Akhara for Girls and Boys,
    at Balali village of Charkhi Dadri district, founded by Mahavir Singh Phogat, the father and coach of Olympian Geeta Phogat and Babita Kumari, inspired from their hard work with help of its story line Amir Khan made a movie and made crores out of it Dangal
  - Purn Giri Akhara at Shamsukh village in Hisar district.
  - Tau Devi Lal Stadium Akhara for Girls and Boys at Tau Devi Lal Stadium in Gurgaon.
- Kerala
  - Parashurama Akhara
- Maharashtra
  - Motibag Akhara, Gnagavesh Akhara, Shahupuri Akhara, Kolhapur, established by rajashri Shahu of kolhapur
  - Chinchechi Talim Akhara,
    at Shukrawar Peth or Pune, founded by Mhaskaji Damodar Pandit in 1773 during the Peshwa rule of Narayan Rao.
  - Devlachi Talim Akara,
    at Mahatma Phule Peth in Pune, founded by Samarth Ramdas in the 16th century.
  - Hanuman Vyayam Prasark Mandal,
    founded in 1914 at Amravati.
  - Shree Laxminarayan Vyayam Shala,
    founded in the 1930s at Arthur Road in Mumbai.
- New Delhi
  - Chandgi Ram Akhara,
    founded by master Chandgi Ram in 1975, first women's wrestling akhara in India.
  - Chhatrasal Akhara,
    at Chhatrasal Stadium.
  - Guru Hanuman Akhara,
    founded by Guru Hanuman in 1925 at Maujpur.
  - Guru Jasram Ji Akhara,
    founded in the mid 20th century.
  - Guru Rajkumar Goswami Akhara
- Punjab
  - Ranjit Akhara,
    founded by Guru Hargobind (1595-1644 CE) at Akal Takht in Amritsar.
- Uttarakhand
  - Akali Nihang Baba Darbara Singh Sanatan Suraj Bansia Shastar Vidiya Shiv Akhara,
    founded in 1661 for the Nihang martial arts, such as gatka.
- Uttar Pradesh
  - Goswami Tulsidas Akshara,
    at Varanasi, said to be founded by the Tulsidas (1497/1532[1]–1623)
  - Shivalay Pehalwanji ka Akhara,
    at Mathura.
- Tamil Nadu
  - Agastmuni Akhara
- Orissa
  - Paika akhada
- West Bengal
  - Nashipur Akhara

== Shashtra Monastic Akhara ==
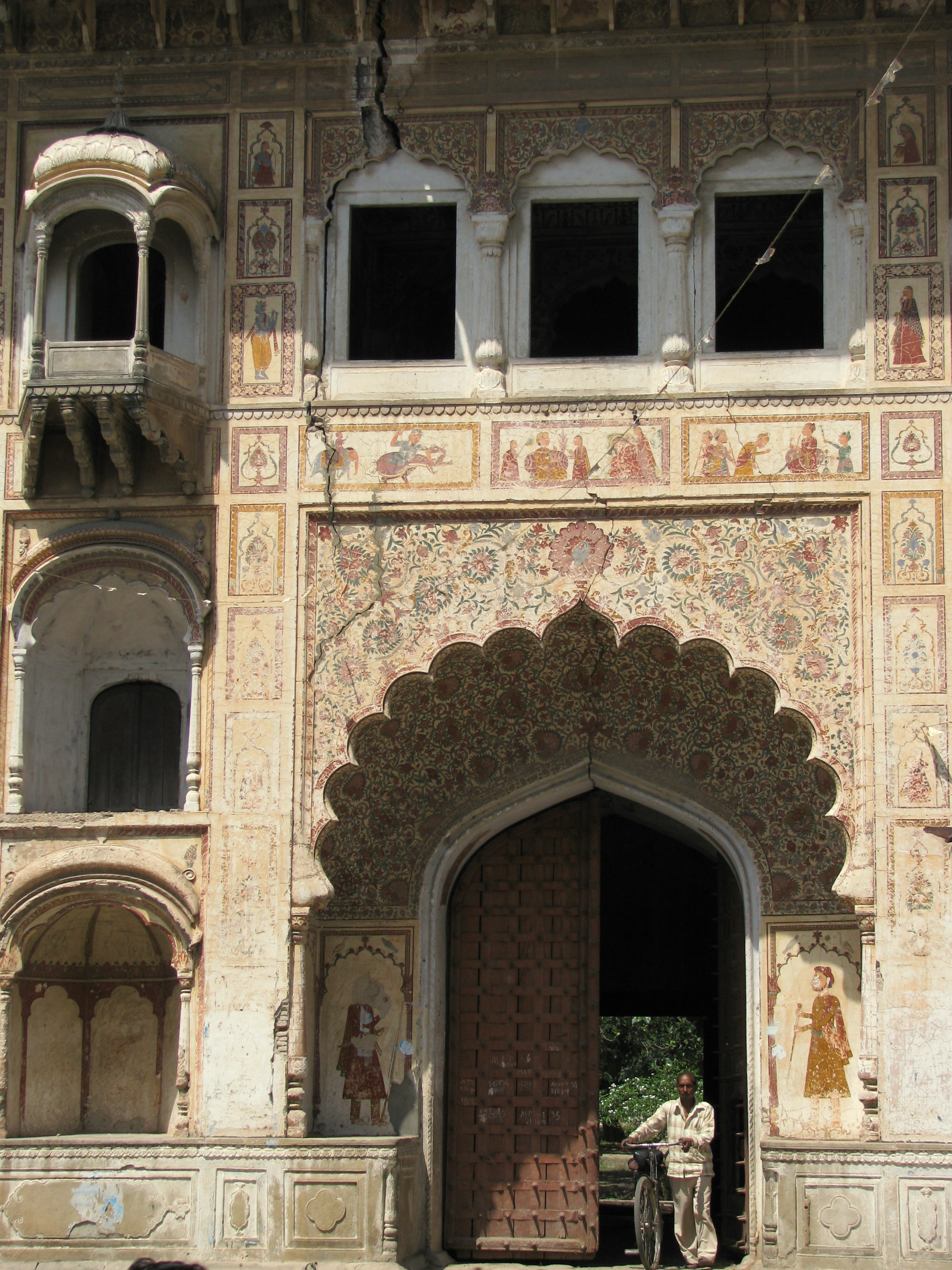
Front facade of Naya Udasin Akhara, Kankhal

Shastra (Sanskrit and Hindi: शास्त्र) means treatise, scriptures or the school of thoughts based on those. There has been a long monastic tradition of obtaining "Shashtra Vidhya" (knowledge of Sashtras) in various Sampradaya schools of thoughts in Hinduism, where disciples could learn one or more of the following in a monastic setting: Hindu scriptures, Yoga Sashtra, Vastu shastra (architecture), Vaimānika Shāstra (ancient aerospace technology), Jyotiḥśāstra (astrology), Nadi Sashtra (fortune telling), Rasa shastra (medicine), Shilpa Shastras (arts and craft), Natya Shastra (dance, drama and performing arts), Tantra, Para Vidya (Higher scholar), Madhu-vidya (knowledge of bliss), and so on.

=== Organisation of Monastic Akhara ===
According to some texts, an akhara is governed by the sacred body of five Sri Pancha and organised into 52 Matha or Marhi (Hindi: मढ़ी). Many assume 52 Marhi to refer to 52 lineages but they refer to 52 Desas (countries). These 52 Marhis are divided into 8 Davas corresponding to 8 directions. The maths are permanent centres of monastic practice with physical structures, led by a mahant or spiritual leader. Though not all akharas follow this structure, mainly due to the insufficient size. For example, smaller akhara, some as small as having only one marhi, may be set up either as a subsidiary affiliate to a larger and more established older akhara group or occasionally an independent akhara due to the disagreements over succession. Akharas can march as subsidiary akhara under the current preferential order of sequence in the Shahi Snan during Kumbh Mela or they are given the last place if their claim for the independent akhara is approved by the authorities.

==== Sri Pancha ====
According to the texts, the top administrative body of each of the akhara is the Sri Pancha (sacred body of five), representing Brahma, Vishnu, Shiva, Shakti and Ganesha. It is elected by consensus from among the Mahants of Matha or Marhi (Sanskrit: मठ and Hindi: मढ़ी ) that make up an akhara on every Kumbha Mela and the body holds its post for 4 years. It is a concept similar to centuries-old Indian republican consensual elective system of Panchayat (at an individual village level) and Khap (grouping of the related villages within a union).

Among the five elected Sri Pancha of the akhara, they hold the following positions in the decreasing order of seniority, all of which can be considered guru in their own right:

- Acharya Mahamandaleshwara, the Great leader and Teacher of the spiritual order of the God
- Mahamandaleshwara, the senior divisional leader of the spiritual order of the God
- Mandaleshwara, the divisional leader of the spiritual order of the God
- Sri Mahant, the senior spiritual leader
- Mahant, the spiritual leader or master. Each Matha (marhi) within the akhara is governed by a mahant

=== Sampradaya-based Classification of Akharas ===
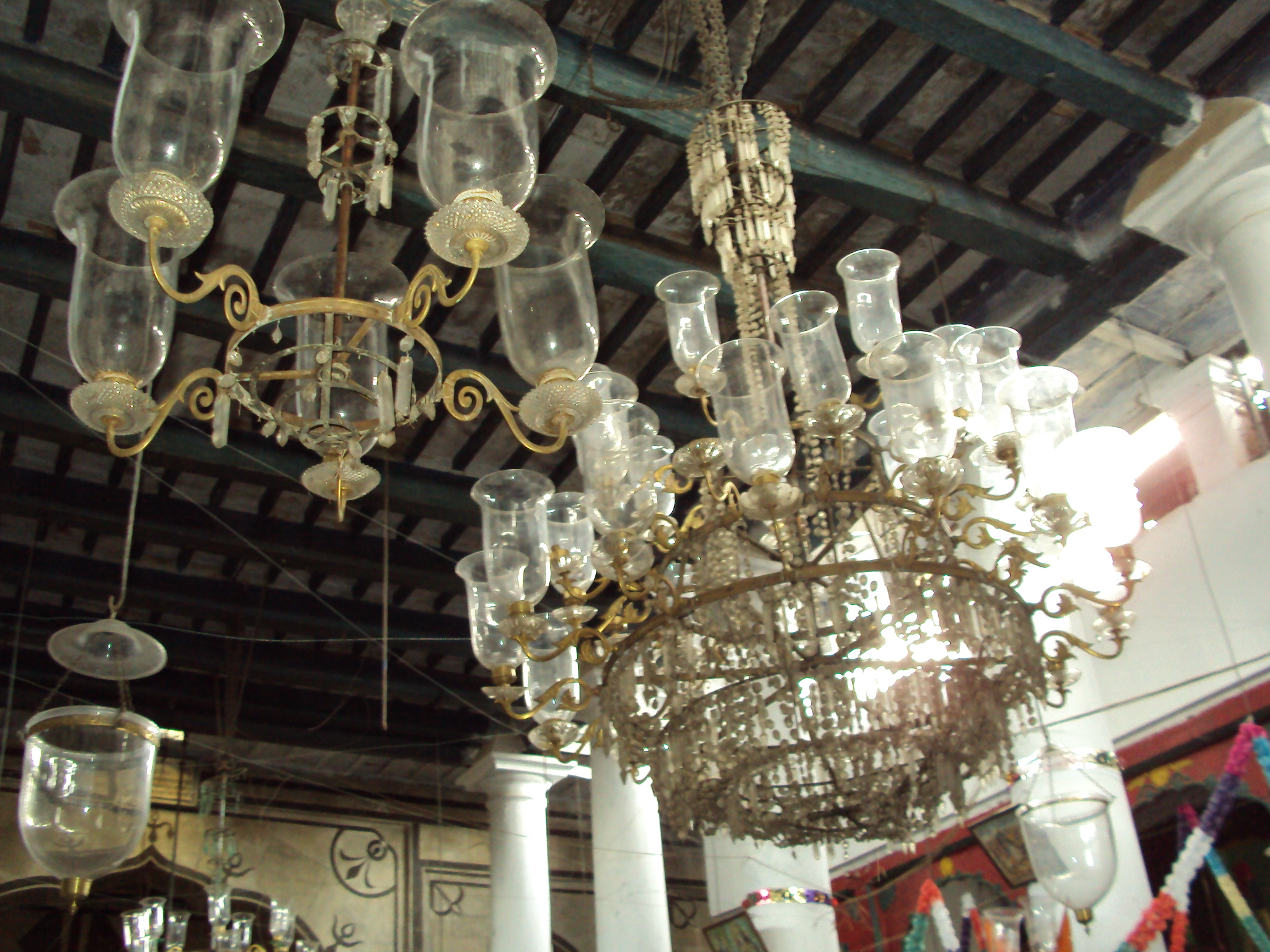
Nashipur Akhara Chandeliers.

At highest level, akhara are classified into one of the four different Sampradaya (philosophical denominations) based on their traditional systems: Each sampradaya has several paramparas (lineages), each started by a guru based on the guru-shishya tradition. The subsidiary status is as per the traditional Shahi Snan preferential sequence of procession, though time to time several subsidiary akharas have unsuccessfully tried with authorities to have this sequence altered as the number of their followers grew.

Initially there were only 4 akharas based on the sampradaya (sect), which have split into subsidiary akharas due to differences in the leadership and expansion in the followership. In January 2019, there were 13 akharas that are allowed to participate in Prayagraj Kumbh Mela and they have formed the Akhil Bharatiya Akhara Parishad with 2 representatives from each of the 13 akharas to manage the akhara-related affairs across all kumb melas and across the nations.

- A. Sanyasi Akhara (Hindi: सन्यासी अखाड़ा) of the followers of Shiva. Examples of these akharas include the:
  - Niranjani Akhara and its subsidiary
  - Ananda Akhara
  - Juna Akhara and its subsidiaries
  - Avahan Akhara
  - Agni Akhara.
  - Pari Akhara, an exclusive akhara of female sadahavi (saints), was included in Prayagraj Kumbh for the first time starting from 2013 as a subsidiary akhara of one of the existing akhara.
  - Kinnar Akhara, an exclusive akhara of transgender people, was included in Prayagraj Kumbh for the first time starting from 2019 as a subsidiary akhara of the Dashanami Akhara.
- B. Vairagi Akhara, also Bairagi Akhara (Hindi: बैरागी अखाड़ा) of the followers of Vishnu. Examples of such akharas include the:
  - Mahanirvani Akhara (or simply Nirvani) and its subsidiaries
  - Atal Akhara
  - Nirmohi Akhara
  - 11. Digambar akhara
  - 12. Khalsa akharas.
- C. Udasi Akhara (Hindi: उदासी अखाड़ा) and Nirmala Akharas of the followers of Hinduism (with Sikh practices). Examples of such akharas include the:
  - Udasin Panchayati Bada Akhara
  - Udasin Panchayati Naya Akhara
  - Panchayati Akhara Nirmal
- D. Kalpwasis akhara (Hindi: कल्पवासी अखाड़ा) of the followers of Brahma, generally ordinary people who are temporarily living the austere life during the Kumbh Mela to mimic Vanaprastha (Sanskrit: वनप्रस्थ) "retiring into a forest" stage of later life. In that sense kalpwasi akhara is a temporary akhara of no fixed ongoing organisation or leadership.

=== Still-extant Ancient Akharas ===
The still-extant seven Shastradhari or monastic Hindu akhara founded by the 8th-century philosopher Adi Shankaracharya (also the founder of four Mathas) can be classified, in terms of affiliation and the number of followers, as three major akharas, three minor akharas under major akharas and one smaller akhara under the major akhara:

#	Akhara	Subsidiary Akhara	Sub-subsidiary Akhara
1	Niranjani Akhara; Founded in 904 CE	Ananda Akhara, attached to Niranjani Akhara	-
2	Juna Akhara; Founded in 1146 CE	Avahan Akhara, attached to Juna Akhara	Agni Akhara, attached to Juna Akhara
3	Mahanirvani Akhara	Atal Akhara, attached to Mahanirvani Akhara	-

The akhara with the most sadhu is Juna Akhara, followed by Niranjani Akhara and Mahanirvani Akhara. Among these, today, three are considered major akhara (Juna, Niranjani and Mahanirvani) and three minor akhara (Avahan affiliated with Juna, Ananda affiliated with Niranjani and Atal affiliated with Mahanirvani). The 7th, small Brahmachari (celibate) akhara named Agni is also affiliated with Juna Akhara.

=== Akharas Today ===
There are numerous other still-extant akharas, founded by the disciples of the existing akharas, that are usually loosely or directly aligned under one of the existing akhara lineage. The Akhil Bharatiya Akhara Parishad (ABAP) (Hindi: अखिल भारतीय अखाड़ा परिषद, transliterated as All India Akhara Council), founded in 1954, is the apex organisation of 13 akharas of Hindu Sants (saints) and Sadhus (ascetics) representing the largest followership in India. These are entitled to the special privilege of the Shahi Snan at Kumbh Mela and Ujjain Simhastha mela in a pre-determined sequence.

==== Akharas Sequence At Kumbh Mela's Shahi Snan ====
The monastic akhara and their Sri Pancha of various sects meet during the Kumbha Mela. The Naga sadhu and the various akhara traditionally lead and initiate the bathing rituals before the general population steps in.

The order of procession is

1. Mahanirvani akhara with Atal akhara,
2. Niranjani akhara with Anand akhara,
3. Juna akhara with Ahvahan and Agni akhara,
4. Nirvani akhara,
5. Digambar akhara,
6. Nirmohi akhara,
7. Naya Udasin akhara,
8. Bada Udasin akhara, and
9. Nirmal akhara.

== See also ==
- Education in India
- Ekal Vidyalaya
- Gurukula
- History of education in the Indian subcontinent
- Vidya Bharti
