= Tulsi Peeth edition of the Ramcharitmanas =

Critical edition of the Ramcharitmanas (2005)

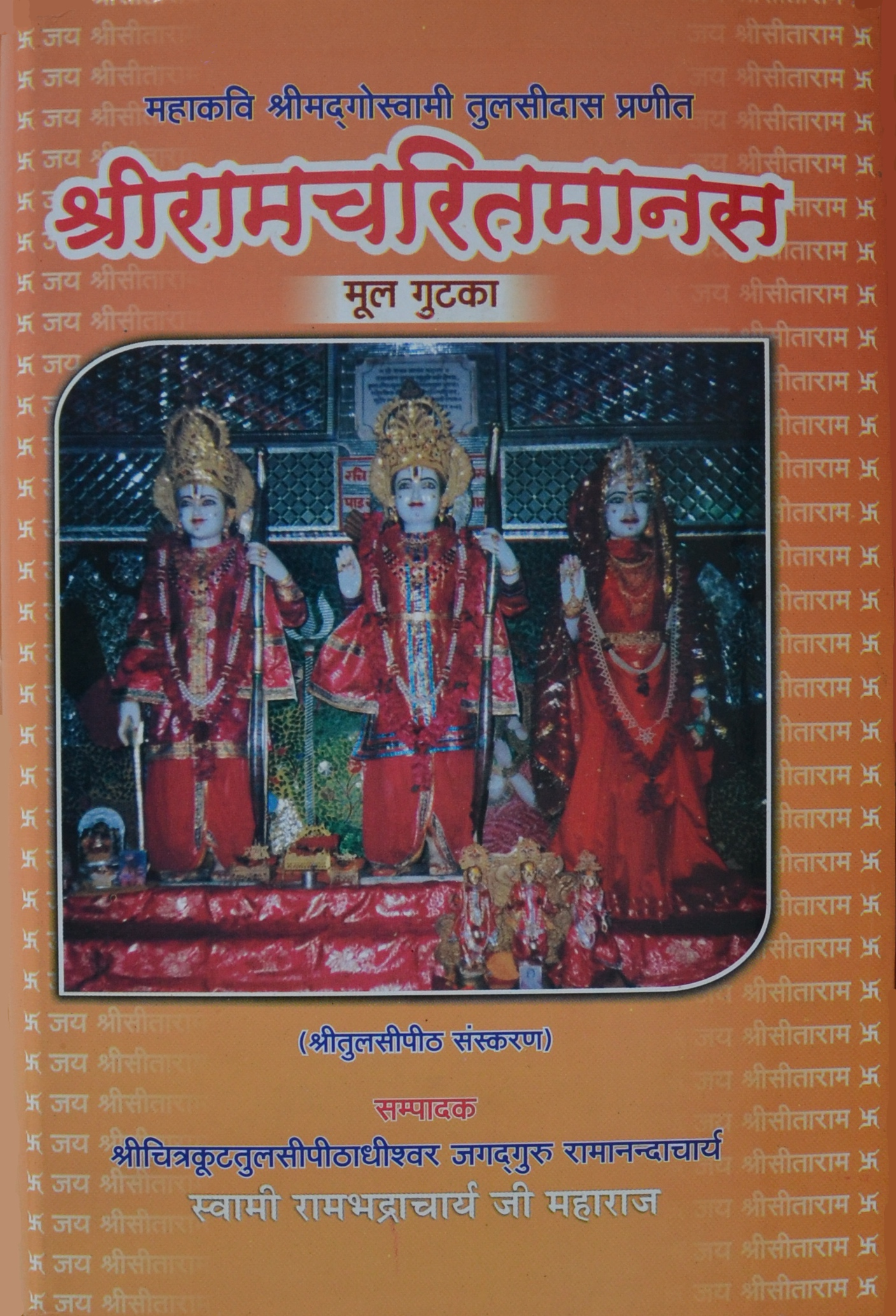
- Cover page of the Tulsi Peeth edition of the Ramcharitmanas
- Author: Rambhadracharya
- Original title: रामचरितमानस का श्रीतुलसीपीठ संस्करण
- Language: Awadhi
- Publisher: Shri Tulsi Peeth Seva Nyas
- Publication date: 2005
- Publication place: India

The Tulsi Peeth edition of the Ramcharitmanas is a critical edition of the Ramcharitmanas edited by Jagadguru Rambhadracharya and published by the Tulsi Peeth. It has more than 3000 differences compared to the popular editions of the scripture.

In November 2009 a controversy arose over this edition in Ayodhya, when the Akhil Bharatiya Akhara Parishad and Ram Janmabhoomi Nyas demanded an apology from Rambhadracharya over the Tulsi Peeth edition, accusing him of tampering with the epic. The author responded saying that he had merely edited extant copies of the epic and not modified the original epic. The dispute died down after Rambhadracharya expressed his regret for any annoyance or pain caused by the publication. A writ petition was also filed against him but it was dismissed. This edition was published in 2005 by Shri Tulsi Peeth Seva Nyas.

== Differences in the Tulsi Peeth edition ==
The Ramcharitmanas was composed by Tulsidas in the late sixteenth century. It has been extremely popular in northern India over the last four hundred years, and is often referred to as the "Bible of northern India" by Western Indologists. After nearly eight years of research, Rambharacharya came up with a critical edition of the Ramcharitmanas. Rambhadracharya says he has relied extensively on older manuscripts for the text of the epic. Ram Sagar Shukla notes the following differences in spelling, grammar, and prosodic conventions between the Tulsi Peeth edition and contemporary editions of the Ramcharitmanas.

1. Several present-day editions, including the one by the Gita Press, consider one chaupai verse to be a unit of 64 syllabic instants (Note: Mātrās or temporal units, where a short syllable has one instant and a long syllable has two.) in two lines, where each line has two parts, each of 16 instants. Some other scholars count one chaupai verse as a unit of only 32 instants. Rambhadracharya has considered a chaupai to consist of 32 instants in one line, citing the examples of Hanuman Chalisa and the critique of Padmavat by Ramchandra Shukla in support. He says that the chaupai still has four feet, because of the caesura after every eighth instant.
2. With some exceptions, for example when needed to satisfy prosodic constraints, in the Tulsi Peeth edition, words in the nominative and accusative cases do not end in the rounded vowel (Unicode उ, IPA /u/), as they do in present-day editions. Rambhadracharya considers such endings to be artefacts in the manuscripts, calling them unnatural in Awadhi. Most of the corresponding words in the text of Tulsi Peeth edition end in the central vowel (Unicode अ, IPA /ɐ/)
3. The Tulsi Peeth edition does not use nasalised vowels (anunasika) to indicate case endings. According to Rambhadracharya, this is the same as in older editions, where the use of anunasika for case endings is absent.
4. In place of the conjunct nasal-fricative consonants nh (Unicode न्ह्, IPA /n̪ɦ/) and mh (Unicode म्ह्, IPA /mɦ/) seen in accusative plural and second person pronoun usages in contemporary editions, the Tulsi Peeth edition has the single nasal consonants n (Unicode न्, IPA /n̪/) and m (Unicode म्, IPA /m/) respectively.
5. For Tadbhava words, the Tulsi Peeth edition uses the dental fricative s (Unicode स्, IPA /s̪/) instead of the palatal fricative ś (Unicode श्, IPA /ɕ/) in the corresponding Tatsama form selectively, only at places where the replacement does not result in a faux pas. For example, the dental fricative is used in the word sobhā (सोभा, from Sanskrit śobhā, meaning splendour or brilliance) but the palatal fricative is unchanged in Śaṃkara (शंकर, a name for Shiva) where the replacement would result in Saṃkara (संकर), which means a child born out of wedlock. Contemporary editions use the dental fricative throughout.

== Controversy ==
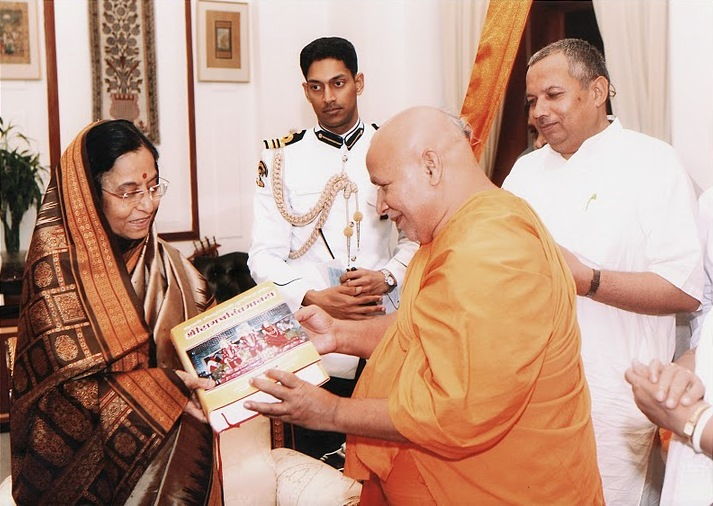
Jagadguru Rambhadracarya presenting the critical edition of Ramacaritamanasa to the President of India, Pratibha Patil

In November 2009 a controversy arose over this edition in Ayodhya, when the Akhil Bharatiya Akhara Parishad and Ram Janmabhoomi Nyas demanded an apology from Rambhadracharya over the Tulsi Peeth edition, accusing him of tampering with the epic.

=== Accusations ===
In a report in Times of India, Manjari Mishra and V N Arora accused Rambhadracharya of committing a "blasphemous act of challenging the mighty pen of the Goswami". Nritya Gopal Das, president of Ram Janmabhoomi Nyas, was quoted by Times of India as saying, "How dare he ... he has committed an pardonable [sic] sin and must own it up". A Zee News report accused Rambhadracharya of "changing dohas to chaupais" and vice versa, "changing the wordings of several verses", and "renaming Laṅkākāṇḍa to Yuddhakāṇḍa". Zee News reported that a Mantra of page 59 of the edition called Rambhadracharya a Rishi, and quoted that The Akhil Bharatiya Akhara Parishad chairperson Mahant Gyan Das as questioning how Rambhadracharya could be called a Rishi, a term used for the likes of Vamadeva, Jabali and Vasistha. Gyan Das and Nritya Gopal Das also accused the swami of "deleting certain verses and arbitrarily substituting news words". Gyan Das said that as per the meeting of Saints and Dharmacharyas, it was decided that Rambhadracharya should apologise till 8 November, otherwise a decision will be taken to remove Rambhadracharya from the post of Jagadguru in the proposed meeting of the Parishad on 10 November.

=== Response by Rambhadracharya ===
Times of India reported Rambhadracharya's disciples as denying the charges of deleting verses and substituting words. Rambhadracharya told Times of India that he had "merely edited, not altered the Ramcharitmanas published by Geata Press, Gorakhpur". He said that "they have pronounced me guilty without even going through my book", and added that the controversy was "a ploy to malign me and extort money". On the use of the word Rishi to refer to him, Zee News reported Rambhadracharya's response that a Rishi is somebody who sees a Mantra and in this sense he was a Rishi for the new Mantra he proposed for offering oblation to the Ramcharitmanas. Later in 2010, Dainik Jagaran and One India websites reported Rambhadracharya's response to the controversy, quoting him as saying that he had merely edited extant copies of the epic and not modified the original epic, similar to what Nanda Dulare Vajpayee had done for the Gita Press edition published in 1949.

The dispute subsided on 8 November 2009, when Rambhadracharya sent a letter to the Akhara Parishad, expressing regret over any annoyance or pain caused by the publication of the Tulsi Peeth edition. In the letter, he requested the Akhara Parishad to consider older printed editions of the Ramcharitmanas as authentic, not others. The saints in Ayodhya expressed satisfaction over the language of the letter and decided to stop the protest against Rambhadracharya.

=== Court case ===
A writ petition filed in 2008 by Shiv Asray Asthana, publisher of the journal Prakhar Vichar, seeking the seizure and forfeiture of Rambhadracharya's critical edition on the grounds that it hurt religious sentiments, was dismissed by the Lucknow Bench of the Allahabad High Court in May 2011. Asthana was fined ₹20,000 (US$210) by the high court. Speaking to Dainik Jagran, Rambhadracharya termed the decision as a victory of the fundamental rights and announced a nine-day victory celebration.

== Critical response ==
Several scholars of Hindi and Ramcharitmanas have reviewed the critical edition by Rambhadracharya. Prem Bhushan, a Kathavachak and discipline of Rambhadracharya, said that the "differences are mainly related to grammar and spelling". Ram Sagar Shukla, a retired correspondent of Prasar Bharti, wrote that "most of the corrections" in the Tulsi Peeth edition pertain to the language of the epic, while some relate to several episodes.Shukla doubts the swami Rambhadracharya's opinion on the definition of Chaupai, saying that according to Pingala's definition a Chaupai has 64 instants, and that the title Hanuman Chalisa could also mean 40 half-Chaupais. Sunita Shastri, a scholar on Ramcharitmanas and advisor to Gita Press, told the Times of India that she examined the book for two hours and found "several verses missing " in the Ayodhyakand from the Tulsi Peeth edition. She quoted the verse dīpaśikhā sama juvati tana ... as missing. Ravindra Agnihotri, author in Sanskrit, Hindi and English, wrote that Rambahdracharya pointed to "more than 3000 mistakes in contemporary prevalent editions" including addition of verses and change of words, and added that the Akhil Bharatiya Akhada Parishad and Ram Janmabhoomi Nyas should have praised his work instead of criticising him.

== Works cited ==
- Dinkar, Dr. Vagish (2008). श्रीभार्गवराघवीयम् मीमांसा [Investigation into Śrībhārgavarāghavīyam] (in Hindi). Delhi, India: Deshbharti Prakashan. ISBN 9788190827669.
- Nagar, Shanti Lal (2002). Sharma, Acharya Divakar; Goyal, Siva Kumar; Sushil, Surendra Sharma (eds.). The Holy Journey of a Divine Saint: Being the English Rendering of Swarnayatra Abhinandan Granth (First, Hardback ed.). New Delhi, India: B. R. Publishing Corporation. ISBN 81-7646-288-8.
- Pandey, Ram Ganesh (2008) [First edition 2003]. तुलसी जन्म भूमि: शोध समीक्षा [The Birthplace of Tulasidasa: Investigative Research] (in Hindi) (Corrected and extended ed.). Chitrakoot, Uttar Pradesh, India: Bharati Bhavan Publication.
- Rambhadracharya, Jagadguru, ed. (30 March 2006). श्रीरामचरितमानस – मूल गुटका (तुलसीपीठ संस्करण) [Śrīrāmacaritamānasa – Original Text (Tulasīpīṭha edition)] (in Hindi) (4th ed.). Chitrakoot, Uttar Pradesh, India: Jagadguru Rambhadracharya Handicapped University.
