= Akhil Bharatiya Akhara Parishad =

Organization of Hindu sadhus and sants in India

- Formation: 1954
- Type: Religious organization
- Headquarters: Ayodhya, Uttar Pradesh
- Location: India
- Mahant: Ravindra Puri (since October 2021)
- Main organ: Committee
- Website: akhadaparishad.org

The Akhil Bharatiya Akhara Parishad ABAP (IAST: Akhila Bhāratīya Akhāḍā Pariṣad; lit. 'All India Monastery Council'), is one of the organizations of Hindu sants (saints) and sadhus (ascetics) in India. The ABAP is composed of 13 akharas, or organisations of Hindu sants and sadhus. Nirmohi Akhara (involved in the Ram Janmabhoomi dispute in Ayodhya), Shri Dattatreya Akhara (the largest) and Niranjani Akhara (the second largest) are some of the prominent akharas which are part of it.

== Organisation ==
The Akhil Bharatiya Akhara Parishad is based on the system of akharas in Hindu society. An akhara literally means a wrestling ring in Sanskrit, but also stands for a place of debate. There are 13 such organisations based on the form of Hinduism and Hindu philosophy they adhere to. Most akharas are Vaishnavas (devotees of Vishnu) and Shaivas (devotees of Shiva) but there are also Udasi and Nirmala akharas. The group works with the administration and government regarding facilities for the saints and sages at the four Kumbh Melas held in the country to prevent difficulty with travelling and visiting saints and pilgrims. Each akhara can be divided into eight davas (divisions) and fighty-two marhis (centres), with each centre being led by a Mahant (traditional head or leader). The akharas conduct rituals, perform yogic activities, engage in meditation, initiate new members, offer spiritual education, and give darshan to devotees. The arrival of the akharas in the city the Kumbh is held is marked by a procession ceremony known as the peshwai. All the akharas install a dharma-dhvaja flag at their encampment to mark the beginning of the Kumbh. When the akharas have a bath in the waters, it is known as a shahi snans.

== History ==
=== Background ===
Originally the term akhara or akhada, referred to an arena, such as for wrestling. The term came to evolve to describe an organization or sect of sadhus, described as defenders of dharma. Some trace the origin of the akhara institution to Adi Shankaracharya but it is argued by some researchers that the structural development of akharas was an organic progression coinciding with the institutionalization of ascetic sects.

The system of akharas may date as far back as early 8th century, when Adi Shankaracharya is believed to have established seven akharas (possibly 10 as they are also known as Dasnaami): Mahanirvani, Niranjani, Juna, Atal, Avahan, Agni and Anand Akhara. The earliest recorded founding of an akhara was that of the Avahan in 547 CE. During periods of Muslim rule in India and later British rule, the akharas congregated and organised together, especially during the Kumbha Mela to work for the preservation of Hindu religion and culture. In 1565, Madhusudana Sarasvati started preparing akharas as an armed military force to resist invasions and protect Hindus. Sometimes, akharas would come into conflict with each-other, sometimes violently, and they were especially competitive prior to the onset of British colonial-rule in Northern India, due to them vying for economic and spiritual dominance, trying to win-over control over a Kumbh festival being held to obtain the most financial and material wealth and power. This was due to the sadhus back then not only serving religious purposes but they were also engaged in trading along the pilgrimage routes as they transported goods and valuables like gold, silk, and spices. The victorious akhara was permitted to be the first one to bathe in the Ganges on the most sacred bathing day. Until the late 18th century, the akharas also acted as warriors and mercenaries. At the 1760 Haridwar Kumbh, around 18,000 Vaishnavite sadhus were killed in clashes as per Captain Francis Raper (1808) but this figure may be an exaggeration. The 1796 Haridwar Kumbh clash between Nirmalas and Shaivites led to 500 deaths.

With the onset of British-rule, they determined that instead of the different akharas fighting each other for the chance to bathe in the Ganges in a particular order, the order would be codeified and standardised to prevent future violence. Thus, they devised a set-order of batheing determined by the relative strength of the akharas in the late-19th century. Furthermore, the British attempted to outlaw nuditity in 1840, which went against the naga-sadhu traditions, who are naked in public. In-order to appease the Indian population, the British administration turned a blind-eye to the naga sadhus, forgoing policing religious customs in-favour of enacting control over crowd control and sanitation.

=== Foundation ===
The Akhil Bharatiya Akhara Parishad came into being in 1954 after the stampede at the 1954 Allahabad Kumbh (which included temporary bridges built there by the government collapsing) by uniting all the participating akharas for better management of future Kumbh events. The leader responsible for pushing the formation of the body was Anantpuri Maharaj, secretary of the Shri Panchayati Mahanirvani Akhara. Two officials from each participating akhara were included in the council. The akharas, while they have mostly shed their violent disputes of past centuries and have good relations with one another, still strife with one another based upon competitiveness regarding their procession grandiosity, number of banners, and how they perform rituals. The Akhara Parishad now determines which akhara bathes first, usually based upon the size and strength of the groups.

== Politics ==
While the ABAP does not participate in electoral politics, it has a position of great importance in Hindu society as a leading Hindu leadership organisation. At times, it has cooperated with the Vishva Hindu Parishad (VHP), a Hindutva organisation and part of the Sangh Parivar. However, the ABAP has also openly criticised the VHP for raising unnecessary controversies and refused to follow an agenda set by the VHP.

The Akhil Bharatiya Akhara Parishad had encouraged and supported the movement for the construction of a Ram Mandir on the site where the now-demolished Babri Mosque stood in Ayodhya. In 1989, the Nirmohi Akhara filed litigation regarding the site, and in 2010 their claim was upheld by the Allahabad High Court, which gave the akhara control of one-third of the site. The ABAP welcomed the verdict, asserting that it would prevent further exploitation of the issue by political parties.

They are known to sanction anyone who, they believe, misuses Hinduism.

== 13 akharas ==
As of January 2019 there were 13 recognised akharas, with Juna Akhara being the largest. Seven of these akharas were founded by Adi Shankaracharya. There are 3 types of akharas; Nirvani Akhara, Digambar Akhara and Nirmal Akhara. There is also a new, 14th akhara, known as the Kinnar Akhara, composed of transgender people, but they have not received official recognition yet.

=== 7 Shaiva akharas ===
It has the largest number of akharas for the Sadhus, Sants and the Naga Sadhus as well. There are seven Nirvani Akharas:

- Shri Panchadashanam Juna Akhara (Varanasi): It is the largest of the 13 akharas. The Juna Akhara follows the Dashanami Sampradaya of Shaivism founded by Adi Shankaracharya. They worship Lord Dattatreya. The Kinnar Akhara (Transgender Akhara) is also under the Juna Akhara.
- Shri Panchayati Niranjani Akhara (Prayagraj): It is the second largest akhara. It was founded in 904 AD in Gujarat. The Niranjani Akhara worships Lord Kartikeya. The Niranjani Akhara consists of a lot of educated persons having doctorate and post graduation.
- Shri Panch Atal Akhara (Varanasi): It is one of three oldest akharas. They worships Lord Ganesha and the holy symbols of Bhairava Prakash Bhala and Surya Prakash Bhala.
- Shri Panchadashanam Avahan Akhara (Varanasi): It is the oldest monastic order. They worship Lord Ganesha and Lord Dattatreya.
- Taponidhi Shri Anand Panchayati Akhara (Nashik): It is the second oldest akhara. The deity of this akhara is Dev Bhuvan Bhaskar Suryanarayana.
- Shri Panchayati Mahanirvani Akhara (Prayagraj): The deity of the akhara is Rishi Kapila and they have holy symbols like Bhairava Prakash Bhala and Surya Prakash Bhala.
- Shri Panchadashanam Panchagni Akhara/Shri Shambhu Panchagni Akhara (Junagadh): They are Brahmachari saints. They differ from other Shaivite akharas as they do not practice dhuni (the fire sacrifice) and do not consume any intoxicant and wear janeu or the sacred thread. The deity of this akhara is Mata Gayatri.

=== 3 Vaishnava Akharas ===
It is also known as Bairagi Akharas. They are Vaishnavas (followers of Lord Vishnu). It contains three akharas, they are:

- Shri Nirmohi Akhara (Mathura): It was formed in Vrindavan by uniting 18 Vaishnava groups. They worships Lord Hanuman
- Shri Digambar Akhara (Sabarkantha)
- Shri Nirvani Akhara (Ayodhya)

=== 3 Udasin and Nirmala Akharas ===
It has three akharas belonging to the Udasin and Nirmala traditions. They are:

- Shri Panchayati Bara Udasin Akhara (Prayagraj): They follow the teachings of Sri Chand, the elder son of Guru Nanak. It was founded in 1825 by Yogiraj Shri Nirvandev Maharaj in Haridwar.
- Shri Panchayti Naya Udasin Akhara (Haridwar): It was formed by Mahant Sudhir Das in 1846 following a dispute with the Shri Panchayati Bara Udasin Akhara.
- Shri Nirmal Panchayati Akhara (Haridwar): They follow Nirmala Sampradaya. It was founded in 1856 in Punjab by Durga Singh Maharaj. It has close ties with Sikhism.
