= Shree Navatandham =

Holy shrine of Pranami Sampradaya in Nepal

- श्री नवतनधाम
- Named after: NavatanpuriDham
- Location: Gothatar, Kathmandu, Nepal
- Website: http://navatandham.org.np

Shree Navatandham (Nepali: श्री नवतनधाम) is a holy shrine of the Pranami Sampraday in Nepal.

== Typonomy ==
The temple is named after 'Shree 5 Navatanpuri Dham', the main shrine of the Pranami Sampraday.
