= Dhrang =

Coordinates: 23.393°N 69.842°E

Dhrang or Dhrung is a small village located in Kutch District of Gujarat State of India. The village is on border to Pakistan. The other known village nearby is Lodai.

The village is known and famous for Samadhi of Sant Mekan Dada and his five disciples and his animal friends Laliyo, the donkey and Motiyo, the dog. A fair is held in memory of Mekan Dada every year in Hindu calendar month of Magh (February–March), which ends on day of Mahashivratri. The fair being traditionally held over the centuries, is now promoted by Government of Gujarat.

The temple and Samadhi of Mekan Dada is visited by people from all over Gujarat as well Rajasthan at time of this fair. Among the major follower of Mekan Dada are Ahir, who consider him as their God. The Kapadi community, to whom the Sant Mekan Dada belonged are major disciples and also manage the temple premises and Akhara, also known as Mekan Dada no Akharo. Mistri and Rabari also are his followers. The temple was built by architects belonging to Mistri community, under patronage of King of Kutch. Rao Deshalji II of Kutch was also a follower of Mekan Dada. The samadhi of one Mistri Kanji, who was among the first five disciples of Sant Mekan Dada, is also within this premises.
