= Mekan Dada =

Gujarati Hindu saint

Mekan Dada(Mekran Dada)
- Born: 1667; Khombhadi village, Kutch, Gujarat
- Died: 1730 (aged 62–63); Dhrang, Kutch
- Occupations: Sufi Saint, Religious Guru
- Parent(s): hardholji, Pabba bai

Sant Mekan Dada or Mekran Dada (1667–1730 AD) was a Hindu saint belonging to Kapdi sampradaya from Kutch, Gujarat, India.

== Biography ==
Mekan Dada it is said was born in 1667 (Vikram Samvant 1723). He spent his life traveling across the Rann of Kutch, doing this humanitarian services. In his late life he established himself in Dhrang, in V.S. 1786.

Mekandada was born in Khomri village near Nakhatrana in Kutch district . At the age of seven he became a sanyasi . At Ashapura or temple of Hinglaj Mata in Nakhatrana he became a disciple of Gangaraja. Kantharnath and Dattatreya were his later Gurus. With their blessings he is said to have performed miracles and was revered by Hindus and Muslims both.

Mekand Dada is said to have visited Hinglaj Mata Temple in Balochistan and is considered one of the last saint from their community

He spent his whole life in Rann of Kutch, looking after survivors and people lost in desert and serving them food, water and shelter. His two partners were "Laliyo", the Donkey and "Motiyo", the dog. He would load "Laliyo"-donkey with water and food and the "Motiyo" was trained by him to direct the "Laliyo" to travelers lost in great desert of Kutch. Thus they would provide water, food and direction to the hungry, thirsty and lost travelers and nomads passing through the Rann of Kutch. He was also a good poet and composed several hymns based on the Hindu philosophy. Today he is worshipped as the re-incarnation of Lakshman by the Ahir community.

He also had five disciples with him, who religiously followed him and along with Sant Mekan Dada did the humanitarian services, as explained above. Rao Desalji was also a great follower of Mekan Dada. He used to preach villagers and his followers also. He preached against untouchability and superstitions.

The Sant Mekan Dada later took a Samadhi along with his eleven followers in Dhrang village. The Samadhis are one of the most revered sites of Kutch and people of all communities go there to pay their respects and offer prayers. Name of one of his eleven disciples, who took samadhi with Mekan Dada are Mayagarji, Lirbai, Kandha Ahir, Vigha Ahir, Kanthad Suthar, Premji Ganpat, Surdasji, Thakor Mokaji, Jada Khiyaranji Loria, Kadia Kanji, Prema bai. His samadhi along with that of his faithful friend Motiya, the dog and Lalia, the donkey, at Dhrung, a village about 40 km from Bhuj. Other two disciples Hira Harijan at Lodai and Waghoji Rampotro at Vijayasar also took Samadhi when heard news.

== Samadhi memorial ==
The memorial houses his Samadhi Temple, a Temple of Shiva, Samadhis of his five disciples, samadhi of his animal friends "Laliyo"- the donkey and "Motiyo" - the dog, an old 'Vaav'. Also on display are the robes he wore and things he used during his lifetime.

== Makadbanth Kapdi ==
Makadbanth Kapdi are a sect, who are followers of Mekan Dada, and are the most recent sect of Kapdi community.

== Mekan Dada Fair ==
A fair is held in Dhrang village, in memory of Mekan Dada on Mahashivratri, named Mekan Dada Fair. This is an annual event and Gujarat Tourism Department also organises "Kutch Festival" during this fair. This fair is also famous for its rural tradition of old times -"Malla-Akhado" (wrestling) and "Renkda-Daud" (Cart Racing). This 'Mekand Dada Fair' is a major event and centre of tourist attraction in Kutch, Gujarat State of India.
