= Najarpur =

Village in Rautahat district of Nepal

Najarpur (Nepali: नजरपुर) is a village in Rautahat district of Nepal, about 45 mi (or 73 km) South of Kathmandu, the country's capital city.

Najarpur (Nepal)

It is widely known by the name 'vegetarian village' and has been identified as religious tourism site for State 2.

== Demographics ==
The population of the village is about 1000 with about 150 houses.

The heart of the village is a notable Hindu temple. All the villagers are strong supporters of Shree Krishna is the Pranami Sampradaya and are vegetarians. The local authority prohibits smoking, gambling and drinking.

== Toponymy ==
The village was named Najarpur because this place was selected for settlements by most of the groups who migrated to Terai during 1950s. 'Najar' is a Nepali word meaning 'look' and 'pur' means 'place' in Nepali. Able to gain attention of many migrants for settlement who looked for new places to settle, this place was named 'Najarpur'.

== Attractions ==
=== Shree Krishna Pranami Mandir Nijananda Dham ===
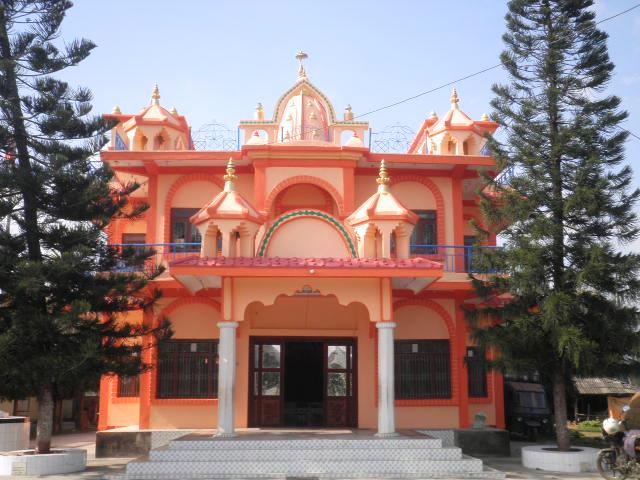
Front view of main temple.

The Najarpur mandir (also known as Pukhraj Dham, Nijananda Dham, Sundar Dham and Pranami Mandir Najarpur) is an important place of pilgrimage for Shree Krishna Pranami Sampradaya. It was built by new settlers who migrated to Najarpur during 1950s. Over time, many reforms took place. By local standards, the temple has a magnificent structure.

The temple's structure is adjacent to "Pukhraj Parbat" -one of the peaks in "Paramdham" as described in the holy book "Shree Tartam Sagar" of Nijananda sampradaya. The design was suggested and implemented by Pandit Shree Hem Prasad Dahal- a resident of the village and popular teacher of Nijananda sampradaya around Nepal.

=== Shree Krishna Pranami Community Primary School ===
Shree Krishna Pranami Community Primary School was established under the Najarpur mandir in 1999. It was the first school in the district to implement Montessori teaching method.
