= Kapadi =

Community in Gujarat, India

Kapadi, also known as Kapdi, is a small community found in Gujarat in India. They are chiefly found in Kutch and Dadra and Nagar Haveli areas of Gujarat

== History ==
The Kapdi Sampradaya claim to be descendants of Raja Raghu who is an ancestor of Lord Rama, the guide of the Hindu deity Rama, Rama's army as they marched through the desert to Hinglaj.

This dress was given by Rama to one Laljusraj, who accompanied him on the trip. Laljusraj is said to be the founder of the Kapdi sect in Hinglaj. It is believed that it is the same dress, that is preserved at Mekan Dada Temple at Dhrang.

They worship Ashapura Mata and make visit the Hinglaj Mata mandir in Balochistan, Pakistan. Although Hinglaj Temple in Pakistan remains their chief kuldevi temple, however, since partition of India, as it is not possible to visit Pakistan by everyone now they visit Hinglaj Mata Mandir at Gandevi and Mahalakshmi Temple, Kolhapur to pay their obsience and for yearly rituals.

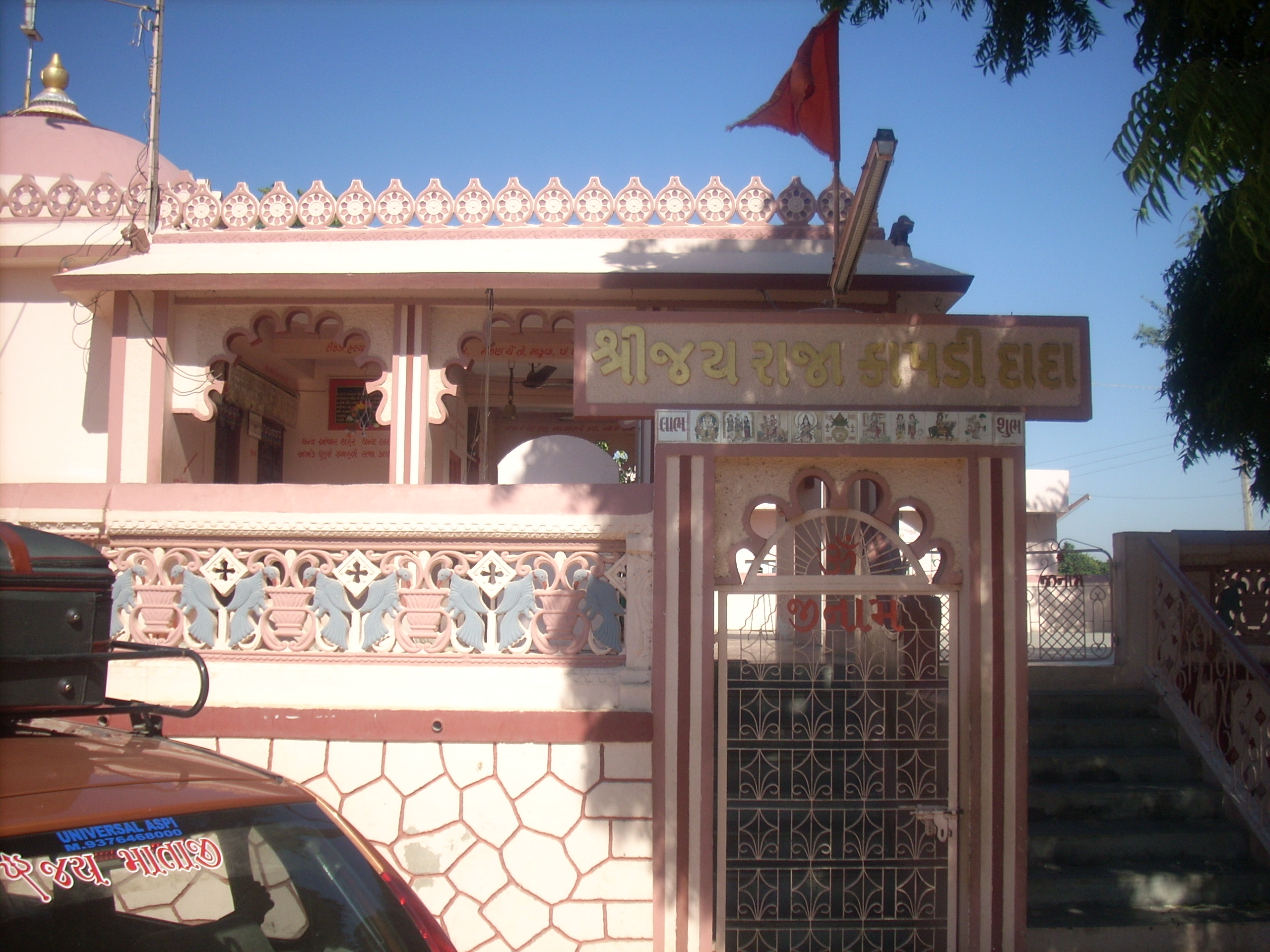
Temple of Shree Jai Raja Kapadi Dada, a saint of Kapadi community, housing his Samadhi at Village Dabada in Kutch. Note mention of Aum and Jee Naam, religious symbol of Kapadi Sampradaya embedded on the main gate written in Gujarati script and deep saffron color.

The Kapdis consider Mekan Dada to be an incarnation of Lakshmana, the younger brother of Rama, and he visited the site of Hinglaj at the end of the 17th century. The Kapadis consider anyone who performs the pilgrimage to Hinglaj to be Kapdi as well.

Historically their traditional occupation was of Gotrej, however, they are in present days earn mainly their livelihood from farming, grocery stores and small time traders.

== See also ==
- Guru-shishya tradition
