= Sampradaya =

Tradition, spiritual lineage or a religious system

Sampradaya (Sanskrit: सम्प्रदाय; IAST: Saṃpradāya), in Indian-origin religions, namely Hinduism, Buddhism, Jainism, and Sikhism, can be translated as 'tradition', 'spiritual lineage', 'sect', or 'religious system'. (Note: The word commands much more respect and power in the Indian context than its translations in English does.) To ensure continuity and transmission of dharma, various sampradayas have the Guru-shishya parampara in which a parampara or lineage of successive gurus (masters) and shishyas (disciples) serves as a spiritual channel and provides a reliable network of relationships that lends stability to a religious identity. Shramana is Vedic term for a seeker or shishya. Identification with and followership of sampradayas is not static, as sampradayas allow flexibility that one can leave one sampradaya and enter another or practice religious syncretism by simultaneously following more than one sampradaya. Samparda is a Punjabi language term, used in Sikhism, for sampradayas. The term panth is sometimes used interchangeably with the word sampradaya, however panth is usually used to refer to various religious traditions associated with the Sant movement.

== Guru-shishya parampara ==
Sampradayas are living traditions of both teaching and practice within a specific religious-spiritual tradition. They are generally composed of a monastic order within a specific guru lineage, with ideas developed and transmitted, redefined and reviewed by each successive generation of followers. A particular guru lineage is called a parampara. By receiving diksha (initiation) into the parampara of a living guru, one belongs to its proper sampradaya.

To ensure continuity through dharma transmission, various sampradayas ensure continuity through Guru-shishya parampara where a Guru teaches shishyas in gurukula, matha, akhara, and viharas. Buddhism also has a lineage of gurus. Tibetan Buddhism has a lineage of Lamas who teach in gompas and stupas.

Titles such as Guru, Acharya, or Mahacharya may be used to denote the level of authority within a lineage (sampradaya).

=== Continuity of sampradaya ===
Sampradaya is a body of practice, views and attitudes, which are transmitted, redefined and reviewed by each successive generation of followers. Participation in a sampradaya ensures continuity with the past, or tradition, but at the same time provides a platform for change from within the community of practitioners of this particular traditional group.

=== Diksha: Initiation into sampradaya ===
A particular guru lineage in the guru-shishya tradition is called parampara, and may have its own akharas and gurukulas. By receiving diksha (initiation) into the parampara of a living guru, one belongs to its proper sampradaya. One cannot become a member by birth, as is the case with gotra, a seminal, or hereditary, dynasty.

=== Authority on knowledge of truth ===
Membership in a sampradaya not only lends a level of authority to one's claims on truth in Hindu traditional context, but also allows one to make those claims in the first place. An often quoted verse from the Padma Purana states:

Mantras which are not received in sampradaya are considered fruitless. (Note: Sampradayavihina ye mantras te nisphala matah)

And another verse states:

Unless one is initiated by a bona-fide spiritual master in the disciplic succession, the mantra he might have received is without any effect. (Note: The original Sanskrit text found in Sabda-Kalpa-Druma Sanskrit-Sanskrit dictionary and Prameya-ratnavali 1.5-6 by Baladeva Vidyabhushana states: sampradaya vihina ye mantras te nisphala matah atah kalau bhavisyanti catvarah sampradayinah sri-brahma-rudra-sanaka vaisnavah ksiti-pavanah catvaras te kalau bhavya hy utkale purusottamat ramanujam sri svicakre madhvacaryam caturmukhah sri visnusvaminam rudro nimbadityam catuhsanah)

As Wright and Wright put it,

If one cannot prove natal legitimacy, one may be cast out as a bastard. The same social standard applies to religious organizations. If a religious group cannot prove its descent from one of the recognised traditions, it risks being dismissed as illegitimate.

Nevertheless, there are also examples of teachers who were not initiated into a sampradaya, Ramana Maharshi being a well-known example. (Note: Sri Ramanasramam, "A lineage of Bhagavan Sri Ramana Maharshi?") A sannyasin belonging to the Sringeri Sharada Peetham once tried to persuade Ramana to be initiated into sannyasa, but Ramana refused.

== Types of sampradayas ==
=== Āstika and nāstika sampradayas ===
Since ancient times, Indian philosophy has been categorised into āstika and nāstika schools of thought.

Āstika and nāstika concept in Hindu, Buddhist and Jain scriptures define Astika as those sampradayas which believe in the existence of Atman (Self) and those who accept supremacy of vedas, Nastika being those who deny there is any "Self" in human beings or do not hold vedas as supreme. In modern context, Astika are also defined as theists and Nastika as atheist. In Indian origin religions, even atheism is considered acceptable, especially under the concept of Sarva Dharma Sama Bhava. The concept of acceptable or valid Dharma excludes the Mleccha (impure) who are considered without the purity of ethics and code of conduct called yamas and niyama.

Sampradayas of Indian-origin religions have their own Darshana or philosophy, encompassing world views and teachings. Six Astika or orthodox sampradayas which believe in supremacy of veda are called shad-darśana (lit. six system), namely Sankhya, Yoga, Nyaya, Vaisheshika, Mimamsa and Vedanta.

==== Āstika or orthodox sampradayas ====
Astika or orthodox sampradayas or schools of Indian philosophy have been called ṣaḍdarśana ("six systems"). This scheme was created between the 12th and 16th centuries by Vedantins. It was then adopted by the early Western Indologists, and pervades modern understandings of Indian philosophy. Each of six āstika (orthodox) schools of thought is called a darśana, and each darśana accepts the Vedas as authority. Each astika darsana also accepts the premise that Atman (soul, eternal self) exists. The āstika schools of philosophy are:

1. Samkhya – An strongly dualist theoretical exposition of consciousness and matter. Agnostic with respect to God or the gods.
2. Yoga – A monotheistic school which emerged from Sankhya and emphasises practical use of Sankhya theory: meditation, contemplation and liberation.
3. Nyāya or logic – The school of epistemology which explores sources of knowledge.
4. Vaiśeṣika – An empiricist school of atomism.
5. Mīmāṃsā – An anti-ascetic and anti-mysticist school of orthopraxy. This school deals with the correct interpretation of the verses in Vedas.
6. Vedānta – The last segment of knowledge in the Vedas, or jñānakāṇḍa (section of knowledge). Vedanta is also referred as Uttara-Mimamsa. Vedānta came to be the dominant current of Hinduism in the post-medieval period.

==== Nastika sampradayas ====
Nastika or hetrodox sampradayas do not accept the authority of the Vedas are nāstika philosophies, of which four nāstika (heterodox) schools are prominent:

1. Ājīvika, a materialism school that denied the existence of free will.
2. Cārvāka, a materialism school that accepted the existence of free will.
3. Buddhism, a philosophy that denies existence of ātman (soul, self) and is based on the teachings and enlightenment of Gautama Buddha.
4. Jainism, a philosophy that accepts the existence of the ātman (soul, self), and is based on the teachings and enlightenment of twenty-four teachers known as tirthankaras, with Rishabha as the first and Mahavira as the twenty-fourth.

=== Polycentric or syncretic sampradayas ===
Some are syncretic in nature which might adopt mixture of concepts from orthodox schools of Hindu philosophy such as realism of the Nyāya, naturalism of Vaiśeṣika, monism and knowledge of Self (Atman) as essential to liberation of Advaita, self-discipline of Yoga, asceticism and elements of theistic ideas. Some sub-schools share Tantric ideas with those found in some Buddhist traditions.

== Hindu sampradayas ==
Hindus subscribe to a diversity of ideas on spirituality and traditions, but have no ecclesiastical order, no unquestionable religious authorities, no governing body, no prophet(s) nor any binding holy book; Hindus can choose to be polytheistic, pantheistic, monotheistic, monistic, agnostic, atheistic or humanist.

Hinduism is subdivided into a number of major sampradayas. Of the historical division into six darsanas (philosophies), two schools, Vedanta and Yoga, are currently the most prominent. Classified by primary deity or deities, four major Hinduism modern currents are Vaishnavism (Vishnu), Shaivism (Shiva), Shaktism (Shakti) and Smartism (five deities treated as same). These deity-centered denominations feature a synthesis of various philosophies such as Samkhya, Yoga and Vedanta, as well as shared spiritual concepts such as moksha, dharma, karma, samsara, ethical precepts such as ahimsa, texts (Upanishads, Puranas, Mahabharata, Agamas), ritual grammar and rites of passage.

=== Vaishnava sampradayas ===
According to the Padma Purāṇa, one of the eighteen main Purāṇas, there are four Vaishnava sampradāyas, which preserve the fruitful mantras: (Note: Quoted in Böhtlingk's Sanskrit-Sanskrit dictionary, entry Sampradāya.)

All mantras which have been given (to disciples) not in an authorised Sampradāya are fruitless. Therefore, in Kali Yuga, there will be four bona-fide Sampradāyas.

During the Kali Yuga these sampradāyas appear in the holy place of Jaganatha Puri, and purify the entire earth.

Each of them were inaugurated by a deity, who appointed heads to these lineages:

Main Deity	Parampara lineage	Acharya	Primary Mathas	Linked sampradaya
Lakshmi Narayana	Sri Sampradaya	Ramanuja	Melukote, Srirangam, Vanamamalai, Tirukkurungudi, Kanchipuram, Ahobila, Parakala	Ramanandi Sampradaya
Vishnu	Madhva Sampradaya	Madhvacharya	Sri Krishna Matha, Madhva Mathas, Gaudiya Math, ISKCON	Gaudiya Vaishnavism
Rudra	Rudra Sampradaya	Viṣṇusvāmī/Vallabhacharya	Jagannath Ballava Math, Satua Baba Ashram	Pushtimarg sect
Four Kumāras	Kumara Sampradaya	Nimbarkacharya	Kathia Baba ka Sthaan, Nimbarkacharya Peeth, Ukhra Mahanta Asthal, Howrah Nimbarka Ashram, Tatiya Sthan Vrindavan	Haridasi tradition

Other major Vaishnav sampradaya are:

- Swaminarayan Sampradaya, founded in 1801 by Swaminarayan
- Pranami Sampradaya
- Radha Vallabh Sampradaya
- Mahanam Sampraday
- Warkari tradition
- Haridasi tradition
- Manipuri Vaishnavism
- Samartha Sampradaya
- Bishnoi Sampradaya
- Matua Mahasangha

=== Shaiva sampradayas ===
There are three main Shaiva sampradayas known as "Kailasa Parampara" (Lineage from Kailash)- Nandinatha Sampradaya, Adinath Sampradaya and Meykanda Sampradaya.

The Nandinatha Sampradaya traces its beginning to at least 200 BCE. Its founder and first known spiritual preceptor was the Maharshi Nandinatha. Nandinatha is said to have initiated eight disciples (Sanatkumar, Sanakar, Sanadanar, Sananthanar, Shivayogamuni, Patanjali, Vyaghrapada, and Tirumular) and sent them to various places to spread the teachings of non-dualistic Shaivism all over the world. Saiva Siddhanta Temple of Hawaii identifies itself as principle Matha or monestory of lineage. Spiritual lineage of the Nandinatha Sampradaya: Maharishi Nandinath→ Tirumular→→→ unknown→Kadaitswami→ Chellappaswami→ Siva Yogaswami→Sivaya Subramuniyaswami → Bodhinatha Veylanswami

Tamil Shaiva Siddhanta philosophy is known as the descendant from the teaching of Sanatkumara, one of the Kumaras. (Sanatkumara→Satyanjana Darshini→Paranjyoti Rishi→Meykandar.

Aghori and Nath are shavite.

Sampradaya	Gurus	Sect nowadays	Principle Mathas	Note
Nandinatha Sampradaya	Tirumular	Tamil Shaiva Siddhanta (Siddha Sampradaya)	Saiva Siddhanta Temple of Hawaii	Tirumantiramis one of the significant holy book along with other saivite text.
Meykandar Sampradaya	Meykandar	Shaiva Siddhanta	Saiva adheenams in South India	trace its origin at Sanatkumara
Adinath Sampradaya	Matsyendranath, Gorakshanath	Siddha Siddhanta (Nath Sampradaya)	Nisargadatta Maharaj and International Nath Order	Connected with Inchegiri branch
Trika Sampradaya	Durvasa Vasugupta	Kashmir Shaivism	Swami Lakshmanjo Academy and other Kashmir Saivite Mathas	Also known as Ragasya Sampradaya and Trayambaka Sampradaya. Starts its gurus at Srikantha, Vasugupta, and Somananda. Sometimes Durvasa also included.

Nandinatha and Meykandar Sampradayas are associated with the Shaiva Siddhanta while Adinath Sampradaya is associated with Nath Shaivism. Other popular Saivite sampradayas are Veerashaiva Samprdaya, Lingayat Sampradaya and Srouta Sampradaya

==== Advaita Vedanta sampradaya ====
===== Advaita Mathas =====
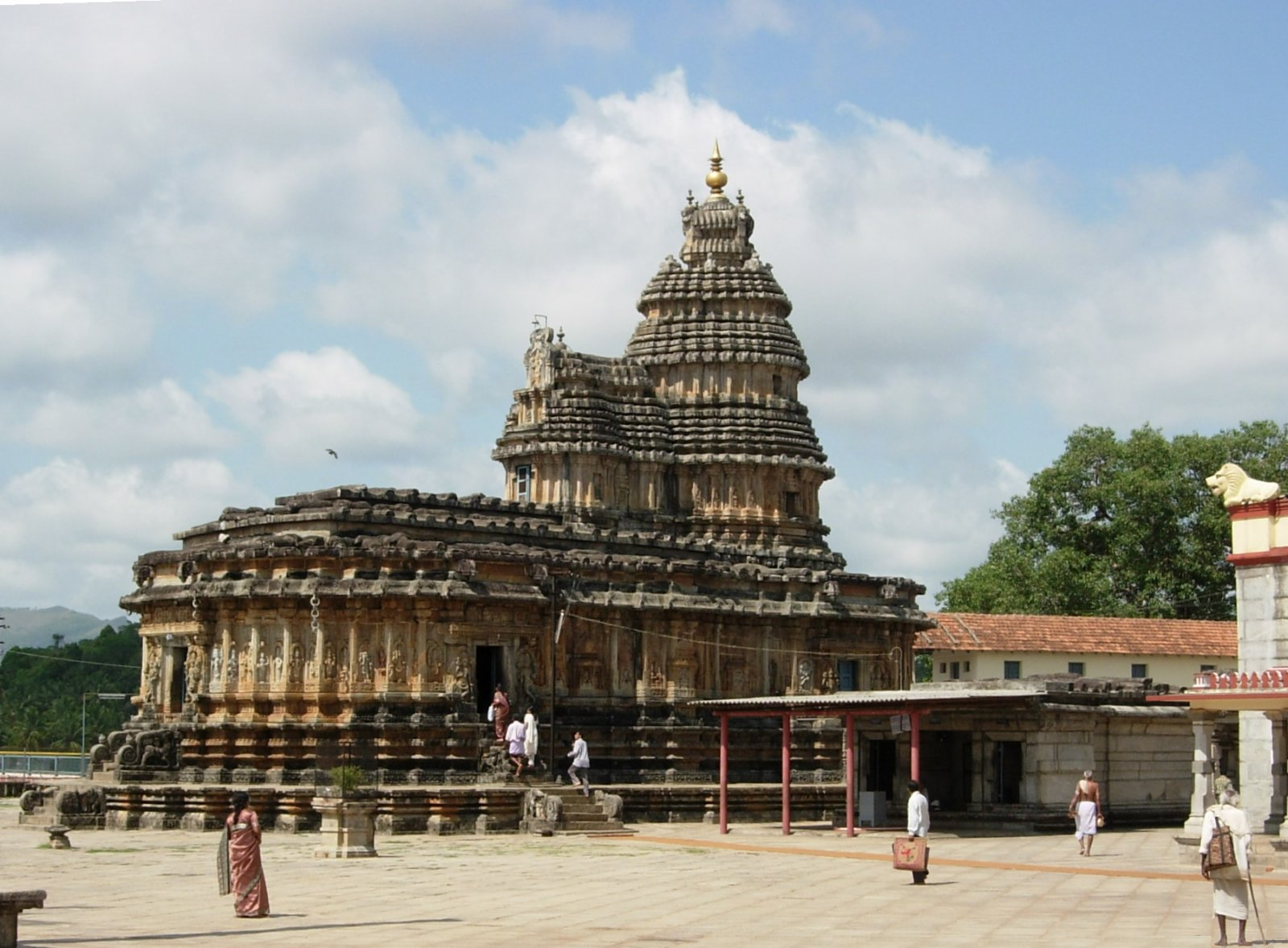
(Vidyashankara temple) at Sringeri Sharada Peetham, Shringeri

Adi Sankara founded four Maṭhas (Sanskrit: मठ) (monasteries) to preserve and develop his philosophies. One each in the north, south, east and west of the Indian subcontinent, each headed by one of his direct disciples.

According to Nakamura, these mathas contributed to the influence of Shankara, which was "due to institutional factors". The mathas which he built exist until today, and preserve the teachings and influence of Shankara, "while the writings of other scholars before him came to be forgotten with the passage of time".

The table below gives an overview of the four Amnaya Mathas founded by Adi Shankara, and their details.

Shishya (lineage)	Direction	Maṭha	Mahāvākya	Veda	Sampradaya
Padmapāda	East	Govardhana Pīṭhaṃ	Prajñānam brahma (Consciousness is Brahman)	Rig Veda	Bhogavala
Sureśvara	South	Sringeri Śārada Pīṭhaṃ	Aham brahmāsmi (I am Brahman)	Yajur Veda	Bhūrivala
Hastāmalakācārya	West	Dvāraka Pīṭhaṃ	Tattvamasi (That thou art)	Sama Veda	Kitavala
Toṭakācārya	North	Jyotirmaṭha Pīṭhaṃ	Ayamātmā brahma (This Atman is Brahman)	Atharva Veda	Nandavala

The current heads of the mathas trace their authority back to these figures, and each of the heads of these four mathas takes the title of Shankaracharya ("the learned Shankara") after Adi Sankara.

According to the tradition in Kerala, after Sankara's samadhi at Vadakkunnathan Temple, his disciples founded four mathas in Thrissur, namely Naduvil Madhom, Thekke Madhom, Idayil Madhom and Vadakke Madhom.

===== Dashanami sampradaya =====
Dashanami Sampradaya, "Tradition of Ten Names", is a Hindu monastic tradition of ēkadaṇḍi sannyasins (wandering renunciates carrying a single staff) generally associated with the Advaita Vedanta tradition. They are distinct in their practices from the Saiva Tridaṇḍi sannyāsins or "trident renunciates", who continue to wear the sacred thread after renunciation, while ēkadaṇḍi sannyāsins do not. (Note: ek=one. ekadandi=of single staff. tridandi=of three staffs.)

The Ekadandi Vedāntins aim for moksha as the existence of the self in its natural condition indicated by the destruction of all its specific qualities. Any Hindu, irrespective of class, caste, age or gender can seek sannyāsa as an Ekadandi monk under the Dasanāmi tradition.

The Ekadandis or Dasanāmis had established monasteries in India and Nepal in ancient times. (Note: Mathas of the Dasanami-sanyasis of Lalitpur) After the decline of Buddhism, a section of the Ekadandis were organised by Adi Shankara in the 8th century in India to be associated with four maṭhas to provide a base for the growth of Hinduism. However, the association of the Dasanāmis with the Sankara maṭhas remained nominal. Professor Kiyokazu Okita and Indologist B. N. K. Sharma says, Sannyasis in the lineage of Advaita of Adi Shankara and the Sannyasis in the lineage of Dvaita of Madhvacharya are all Ēkadaṇḍis.

==== Kaumaram sampradaya ====
Kaumaram is a sect of Hindus, especially found in South India and Sri Lanka where Lord Muruga Karttikeya is the Supreme Godhead. Lord Muruga is considered superior to the Trimurti. The worshippers of Lord Muruga are called Kaumaras.

==== Indonesian Hinduism ====
Hinduism dominated the island of Java and Sumatra until the late 16th century, when a vast majority of the population converted to Islam. Only the Balinese people who formed a majority on the island of Bali, retained this form of Hinduism over the centuries. Theologically, Balinese or Indonesian Hinduism is closer to Shaivism than to other major sects of Hinduism. The adherents consider Acintya the supreme god, and all other gods as his manifestations.

The term "Agama Hindu Dharma", the endonymous Indonesian name for "Indonesian Hinduism" can also refer to the traditional practices in Kalimantan, Sumatra, Sulawesi and other places in Indonesia, where people have started to identify and accept their agamas as Hinduism or Hindu worship has been revived. The revival of Hinduism in Indonesia has given rise to a national organisation, the Parisada Hindu Dharma.

=== Shakta sampradaya ===
There are two Shakta Sampradayas, which revere Shakti – the feminine manifestation of Ishvara. They are as follows:

1. Kalikula: Prevalent in Bengal, Assam, Nepal, and Odisha. Primary deity is Kali
2. Srikula: Prevalent in Kerala, Tamil Nadu, Andhra, Telangana, Karnataka, and Sri Lanka. Primary deity is Lalita Devi

=== Smarta Sampradaya ===
Smarta Sampradaya (स्मार्त), developed around the beginning of the Common Era, reflects a Hindu synthesis of four philosophical strands: Mimamsa, Advaita, Yoga, and theism. The Smarta tradition rejects theistic sectarianism, and it is notable for the domestic worship of five shrines with five deities, all treated as equal – Shiva, Vishnu, Surya, Ganesha, and Shakti. The Smarta tradition contrasted with the older Shrauta tradition, which was based on elaborate rituals and rites. There has been considerable overlap in the ideas and practices of the Smarta tradition with other significant historic movements within Hinduism, namely Shaivism, Vaishnavism, and Shaktism. Even though Smarta sampradaya regards Adi Shankara as its founder or reformer, advaita sampradaya is not a Shaiva sect, despite the historical links with Shaivism: Advaitins are non-sectarian, and they advocate worship of Shiva and Vishnu equally with that of the other deities of Hinduism, like Sakti, Ganapati and others. Shankara championed that the ultimate reality is impersonal and Nirguna (attributeless) and that any symbolic god serves the same equivalent purpose. Inspired by this belief, the Smarta tradition followers, along with the five Hindu gods include a sixth impersonal god in their practice. The tradition has been described by William Jackson as "advaitin, monistic in its outlook".

=== Other classic vedic sampradayas ===
==== Shrautism ====
Shrauta communities are very rare in India, the most well known being the ultra-orthodox Nambudiri Brahmins of Kerala. They follow the "Purva-Mimamsa" (earlier portion of Vedas) in contrast to Vedanta followed by other Brahmins. They place importance on the performance of Vedic Sacrifice (Yajna). The Nambudiri Brahmins are famous for their preservation of the ancient Somayaagam, Agnicayana rituals which have vanished in other parts of India.

==== Suryaism / Saurism ====
The Suryaites or Sauras are followers of a Hindu denomination that started in Vedic tradition, and worship Surya as the main visible form of the Saguna Brahman. The Saura tradition was influential in South Asia, particularly in the west, north and other regions, with numerous Surya idols and temples built between 800 and 1000 CE. The Konark Sun Temple was built in mid 13th century. During the iconoclasm of Islamic invasions and Hindu–Muslim wars, the temples dedicated to Sun-god were among those desecrated, images smashed and the resident priests of Saura tradition were killed, states André Wink. The Surya tradition of Hinduism declined in the 12th and 13th century CE and today remains as a very small movement except in Bihar / Jharkhand and Eastern Uttar Pradesh. Sun worship has continued to be a dominant practice in Bihar / Jharkhand and Eastern Uttar Pradesh in the form of Chhath Puja which is considered the primary festival of importance in these regions.

=== Later sampradayas ===
==== Ganapatism ====
Ganapatism is a Hindu denomination in which Lord Ganesha is worshipped as the main form of the Saguna Brahman. This sect was widespread and influential in the past and has remained important in Maharashtra.

==== Newer sampradayas ====
The new movements that arose in the 19th to 20th century include:

- New groups
  - Ananda Marga
  - Arya Samaj
  - Ayyavazhi
  - Brahma Kumaris
  - Chinmaya Mission
  - Divine Life Society
  - Ramakrishna Mission and Ramakrishna Math
  - Ravidas Panth
    - Satnampanth
  - Shri Ram Chandra Mission
  - Sri Aurobindo Ashram
- Sat Panth
  - Dadu Panth (Part of the Sant Mat)
  - Kabir Panth (Part of the Sant Mat)
  - Pranami Sampraday
  - Sathya Sai sampradaya
- Yoga and meditation based
  - Art of Living
  - Isha Foundation
  - Himalayan Yoga and Philosophy
  - Prarthana Samaj
  - Sahaj Panth (Buddhist and Hindu)
    - Sahaja Yoga
  - Self-Realization Fellowship / Yogoda Satsanga
  - Swadhyay Parivar
  - Transcendental Meditation
- Others
  - Hanuman Foundation
  - Hindutva
  - Inchegeri Sampradaya
  - Kapadi Sampradaya
  - Mahima Dharma
  - Matua Mahasangha
  - Nath Panth
  - Ramsnehi Sampradaya
  - Varkari Panth (Hindu)

== Buddhist sampradaya ==
Buda sampradaya or Buddha sampradāya is a classification based on the observance of Dutch ethnographers of Brahmana caste of Balinese Hinduism into two: Siwa (Shiva) and Buda (Buddha). The other castes were similarly further sub-classified by these 19th-century and early-20th-century ethnographers based on numerous criteria ranging from profession, endogamy or exogamy or polygamy, and a host of other factors in a manner similar to castas in Spanish colonies such as Mexico, and caste system studies in British colonies such as India. This concept of Buddha Sampradāya could be applied to all Buddhist communities.

== Jain sampradaya ==
The Jain sampardaya has various sects or schools of thoughts:

- Tera Panth (Jain)
  - Digambara Terapanth
  - Śvetāmbara Terapanth
- Taran Panth (Jain)

== Sikh Samprada ==
Khalsa Panth i.e. Sikhism has various sects.

=== Early Sampardayas (Sampardai) ===
Akaali Nihangs – Typically viewed as the armed forces of the Sikh Panth. As institutionalised by Guru Gobind Singh, the 10th Guru. Within this order there are the two main ones: Buddha Dal – army of elders, and Tarna Dal – army of youth. Connected to these two are several smaller sub-orders. Buddha Dal holds authority in all matters concerning the Akaali Nihang order – the president of Buddha Dal was previously always also the president of the Akaal Takht, the highest temporal authority of the Sikh Panth. Technically the sect belongs to the Sahibzada (son) of the 10th Guru, Baba Fateh Singh.

Nirmalas – Indic scholars within the Sikh Panth. Traditionally studying a vast array of Indic and some non-Indic literature, as well as producing texts. They also engage in dialogue and discourse with other Dharmik paths. Claim institutionalisation by the 10th Guru also. According to their traditional beliefs, the Nirmala Sikh tradition was founded by Guru Gobind Singh in the late 17th century when he sent five Sikhs to Varanasi (Kansi) to learn Sanskrit and Hindu religious texts. Notable Nirmalas include Kavi Santokh Singh (who was also a student of Giaani Samparda), and Pundit Tara Singh. This Samparda still exist today.

Bhai Daya Singh Samparda – A traditional Khalsai order, tracing back to the tenth Sikh Guru, Guru Gobind Singh, also known as Nirmal Sant Samparda. This Sampardaya was founded by Bhai Daya Singh, the Mukhi of the original Panj Pyaare, under the hukam(command) of Guru Gobind Singh in the early 1700s, aiming to pass down the divine knowledge of Naam and Gurbani to the community. The word 'Sant' translates to 'saint', an enlightened being who has attained spiritual enlightenment and divine knowledge through union with God. Many prominent saints have emerged from this Samparda, including Baba Sahib Singh Bedi, Baba Maharaj Singh, Sant Karam Singh, Sant Isher Singh and Sant Ranjit Singh Virakt.

Udasi – An ascetic order who were traditionally caretakers of Gurdwaras and involved in missionary work. Certain practises of theirs diverge from mainstream Sikh belief although they do not promote this to others. The order was started by Baba Sri Chand, the eldest Sahibzada (son) of the 1st Guru, Guru Nanak. Baba Sri Chand is their Gurdev/Ustadh. Still exist today.

Sevapanthis – Philanthropists, involved in helping others or doing seva – free service without expectation of reward. They are also engaged in scholarly work. The order was first headed by Bhai Kahnaiya, a Sikh of the 10th Guru – who famously helped wounded enemy soldiers during war time by providing medical care. Hardly exist today.

Gyaaniyan Samparda – the university of Sikhi, whilst technically not an order, it essentially serves as one. Made up from individuals belonging to all of the above sects. Many branches within this order.

The Damdami Taksal claims direct lineage from the Giani Samparda, although this is a topic of contention.

=== Later sampardayas ===
Later sects which emerged in Sikhism are Namdhari, Nirankari, and Radha Soami.

=== Syncretic sects ===
The Ravidasiya sect combines practices of Sikhism and Hinduism.

== See also ==
Hindu

- Hindu denominations
- Hindu philosophy
- Hindu texts
- Hindu reform movements
- List of Hindu gurus

Buddhist

- Buddhist philosophy
- Buddhist denominations
- Buddhism parampara

Jain

- Jain denominations
- Jain philosophy
- Tirthankara

Sikh

- Sikhism denominations
- Sikhism philosophy
- Sikh gurus

Islam

- Spiritual lineages in Sufism
- Religious orders in Sufism

== Sources ==
- Apte, V.S. (1965), The practical Sanskrit-English dictionary: containing appendices on Sanskrit prosody and important literary and geographical names of ancient India, Motilal Banarsidass Publ.
- Ebert, Gabriele (2006), Ramana Maharshi: His Life, Lulu.com
- Flood, Gavin (1996). An Introduction to Hinduism. Cambridge: Cambridge University Press. ISBN 978-0-521-43878-0. Archived from the original on 23 December 2023.
- Gupta, R. (2002), Sampradaya in Eighteenth Century Caitanya Vaisnavism, ICJ
- Knipe, David M. (2 March 2015). Vedic Voices: Intimate Narratives of a Living Andhra Tradition. Oxford University Press. ISBN 978-0-19-939770-9.
- Michaels, Axel (2004), Hinduism. Past and present, Princeton, New Jersey: Princeton University Press
- Nakamura, Hajime (2004), A History of Early Vedanta Philosophy. Part Two, Delhi: Motilal Banarsidass Publishers Private Limited
- Nath, Vijay (2001), "From 'Brahmanism' to 'Hinduism': Negotiating the Myth of the Great Tradition", Social Scientist, 29 (3/4): 19–50, doi:10.2307/3518337, JSTOR 3518337
- Nicholson, Andrew J. (2010). Unifying Hinduism: Philosophy and Identity in Indian Intellectual History. Columbia University Press. ISBN 978-0-231-14987-7.
- Tattwananda, Swami (n.d.). Vaisnava Sects, Saiva Sects, Mother Worship. Calcutta: Nirmalendra Bikash Sen Gupta.
- Wright, Michael and Nancy (1993), "Baladeva Vidyabhusana: The Gaudiya Vedantist", Journal of Vaiṣṇava Studies
