= Mahanirvani Akhara =

Hindu movement

- Samkhya: Kapila
- Yoga: Patanjali
- Vaisheshika: Kaṇāda, Prashastapada
- Secular: Valluvar

Mahanirvani Akhara or Shri Panchayati Akhada Mahanirvani (श्री पंचायती अखाड़ा महानिर्वाणी in Sanskrit and Hindi) is a Shaivite shastradhari (spiritual script bearer) Akhada. It is one of the three major (of seven total) shastradhari akhadas in Hindu tradition.

== Introduction ==
Although according to tradition the heritage of Mahanirvani Akhada is ten thousand years old, it was formally organized in 748 CE.

In that year, a group of seven sadhus of Atal Akhada performed tapas (intense spiritual disciplines) at a place called Gangasagar. They received the darshan (divine vision) of the saint Kapila Mahamuni. With his blessings, they revived the naga tradition, officially naming it Mahanirvani Akhada near Neel Dhara in Haridwar. Even today, the chief deity (upaasyadev) of the Mahanirvani Akhada is the legendary saint Kapila Mahamuni.

It was formally organized by Adi Shankaracharya during his lifetime.
