= Kinnar Akhara =

Hindu religious order and hijra community

Kinnar Akhara is an akhara (Hindu religious order) established in 2018 by the hijra community. It is under the Juna Akhada (Shri Panchdashnaam Juna Akhada). The organization showcased itself at the 2019 Kumbh Mela. The organization promotes discussion of Hinduism and LGBT topics.

== Organization ==
Laxmi Narayan Tripathi is the Acharya Mahamandaleshwar of the Kinnar Akhada.

One of the organization's leaders, Pavitra Nimbhorakar, said that the establishment of the organization brought more respect to members of their order.

Bahuchara Mata is a spiritual patron of the community.

The organization claims origins in Hindu tradition. Many of the members of the organization are artists.

== News ==
In September 2018 the Supreme Court of India made a ruling which was favorable to the LGBT+ community regarding Section 377 of the Indian Penal Code. In the context of that ruling, Tripathi made an announcement in that month that the organization would participate in the 2019 Kumbh Mela.

The 2016 Simhast Mela of Ujjain was the first mela where the transgender community participated as an organization. At Kumbh Mela in 2019 the organization presented and performed various arts, including plays, music, dancing, and painting.
