= Adinatha Sampradaya =

Sadhu sect of the Nath tradition

The Adinath Sampradaya was a sadhu sub-sect of the greater Nath tradition. Followers of this tradition were given Sannyasa diksha, thus renouncing householder life, and thereafter lived as naked sadhus. Believing that sadhus should live alone until they had attained the goal, they lived in caves, huts, ruined buildings, or empty houses, and always away from towns and villages. Reference to the Adinath Sampradaya is pointed out by Rajmohan Nath (1964) who lists them among the twelve traditional sub-sects of the Nath Sampradaya. The Adinath Sampradaya is also listed among the sub-divisions of Nath sects in the Census Report, Punjab, 1891, p. 114. The last sadhu holding authentic guru status in the Adinath Sampradaya was Shri Gurudev Mahendranath, who died in 1991. Though he created, and gave Diksha into, a western householder variant of the Nath Tradition, he intentionally terminated the Adinath Sampradaya by refusing to bestow sannyasa diksha, an initiation required for succession. The Sanskrit term Adi Nath means "first" or "original Lord," and is therefore a synonym for Shiva and, beyond mental concepts, the "Supreme Reality" as originator of all things. G.W. Briggs noted, "although Adinath may have been a yogi preceding Matsyendranath, he is now identified with Shiva, and the name is used to trace the origin of the (Nath) sect to the greatest of yogis, the god Shiva".
