= Ram Prasad Bairagi =

Indian priest

Pandit Ram Prasad Bairagi was a priest of the Sabathu temple, Kasauli in Himachal Pradesh. The revolutionary Ram Prasad Bairagi of Sabathu played an important role in the country. He wanted to drive the British out of the country by organizing mass revolution activities. He led a spy organization formed in Himachal to make Gadar a success. In 1857, Bairagi, along with the revolutionaries of Kasauli, had their full support in the war against the British. The revolutionary Ram Prasad Bairagi was hanged by the British in Ambala.
