= Bairagi Dwibedy =

Indian politician

Member of Parliament, Rajya Sabha
- In office 1960-1966
- Constituency: Odisha

Personal details
- Party: Swatantra Party
- Spouse: Hemalata Devi

Bairagi Dwibedy is an Indian politician. He was a Member of Parliament, representing Odisha in the Rajya Sabha the upper house of India's Parliament as a member of the Swatantra Party.
