= Shri Dattatreya Akhara =

Shri Dattatreya Akhara (Hindi: श्री दत्तात्रेय अखाड़ा) or Datta Akhara is a Hindu Monastery, located in Ujjain on the very place where Lord Dattatreya taught his disciples in Treta Yuga. It is one of the fourteen members of Akhil Bharatiya Akhara Parishad.

== Address ==
Dattatreya Akhara Ghat, Kshipra Tat, Opposite Ram Ghat, Ujjain 456006, Madhya Pradesh, India

See the map

== History ==
The history of Guru Dattatreya Akhara dates back at least to AdiGuru Shankaracharya. The Guru-disciple tradition goes back from AdiGuru Shankaracharya to Govindapadacharya, Gaudapadacharya, Shukadeva, Sage Vyasa, Sage Parashara, Shakti Maharishi, Sage Vasishtha, and Lord Brahma. More details are on this page.
