= Pranami Sampradaya =

Monotheistic Hindu sect

Founder
- Devchandra

Regions with significant populations
- India, Nepal

Religions
- Hinduism

Scriptures
- Tartam Sagar

Languages
- Gujarati, Hindi, Nepali

The Pranami Sampradaya, also known as Pranami (lit. 'Those who bow down') or Pranami Panth is a Hindu sect that worships Krishna as the Supreme God. It is based on the teachings of Mahamati Prannath and Devchandra and their holy book, the Tartam Sagar.

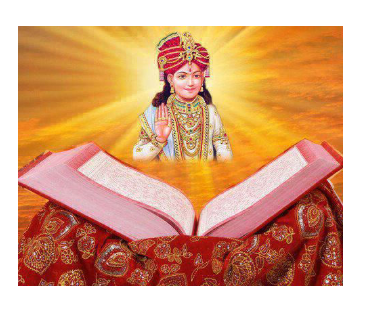
The sacred text of the Pranami sect, the Tartam Sagar

== History ==
The Praṇāmī sect belong to the Sant heritage like that of the Kabīrpanthi, Dādūpanthis, and Sikhs.

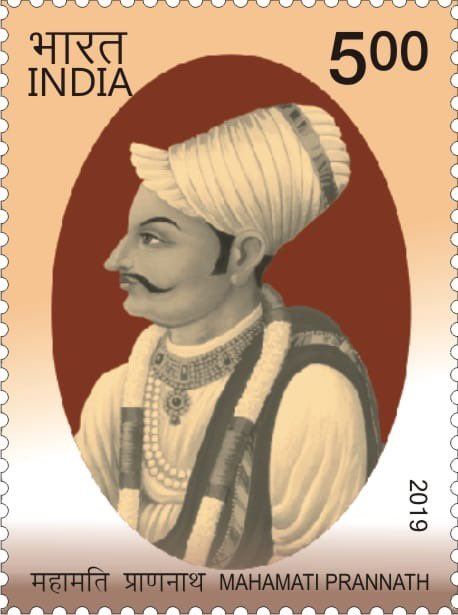
Mahamati Prannath on a 2019 stamp of India.

The Praṇāmī sampradaya emerged in the 17th century in Western India, based on the teachings of Bhakti saints, Devcandra Mehtā and his foremost disciple Mehrāj Ṭhākur aka Prāṇanāth. Devcandra (1581–1655) was born into a wealthy Kāyastha family in Umarkot, Sindh and was initiated into the Rādhāvallabhā sect. According to sectarian tradition, Kr̥ṣṇa visited Devcandra and gave him the tārtam mantra, which gives access to the Iīlās of Kr̥ṣṇa. His disciple Mehrāj Ṭhākur aka Prāṇanāth was born into a Ṭhākur family in Jamnagar, Saurashtra. Prāṇanāth worked as a government official in Saurashtra, and travelled through Arabia, Persia, and Iraq studying the Quʾrān, Bible, and other Islamic-Christian texts. In India he founded the Mahāmaṅgalapurī Temple in Surat. In the 1677 Kumbhamelā in Haridvār, he won a religious debate in which he defeated Vaiṣṇava and Śaiva followers, and was awarded the title of mahāmati. In Jamnagar he was arrested several times for allegedly embezzling public funds.

The traditions grew after Mughal Empire declined, in the wake of Aurangzeb's religious persecution of non-Muslims, when Hindu rebellion led to new kingdoms. King Chatrasāl of Bundelkhand patronized Prāṇanāth, and he lived in its capital Panna, Panna for the rest of his life until his death in 1694. The Pranami tradition welcomed all castes and religions to join the Supreme Truth Shri Krishna worship tradition. At conversion initiation, Prannathji would invite the new members to dine together regardless of whether they came from any Sanatan background. He would also explain the Pranami ideas by citing Hindu and Islamic texts to make his teachings connect with the background of the converts.

The Pranami Sampradaya is also known as the Nijananda Sampradaya, literally, 'nij' meaning, oneself or own and 'ananda' meaning bliss or joy. The Pranami sampradaya's teachings tries to bridge the gap between the Eastern religions and Western religions together stating that both the Eastern and Western religions talk about the same one almighty god.

The Praṇāmī sect is heavily influenced by Islam, having developed in an era of Islamic rule. Prāṇanāth claimed that Hinduism and Islam both contained the same esoteric truths, and that the Quʾrān and Vedas both revealed the same truth. According to sectarian tradition, Prāṇanāth is both the last avatār of Viṣṇu and the Mahdī and Chatrasāl is compared to ʾAlī. During his lifetime Prāṇanāth was considered to be both a Hindu sant and a Musim faqīr.

The Praṇāmī corpus, like in other Bhakti movement saint traditions, an eclectic mix of vernacular languages found in central, west and north India: Hindi, Gujarati, and Sindhi.

Until the early 20th century, Praṇāmīs were accused of being crypto-Muslims. They were and are treated suspiciously by others and were considered to be outcastes. In recent decades the sect has gone through Hinduization/Vaishnavization with older Islamic elements being discarded.

Among other notables – Mahatma Gandhi's mother, Putlibai, belonged to Pranami sect. Gandhi in his book My Experiments With Truth mentions about this sect - "Pranami is a sect deriving the best of Gita and Quran, in search of one goal – Shri Krishna."

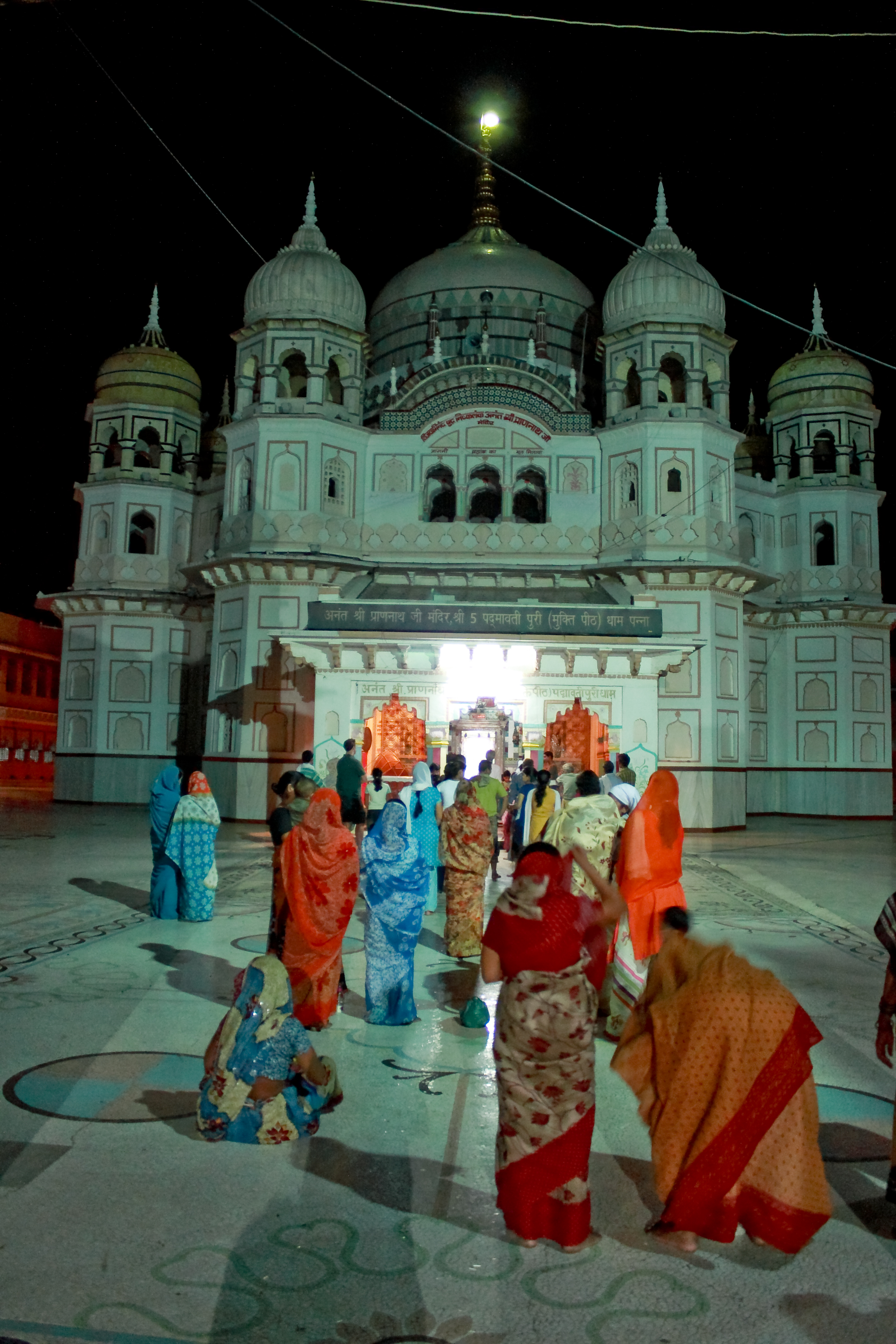
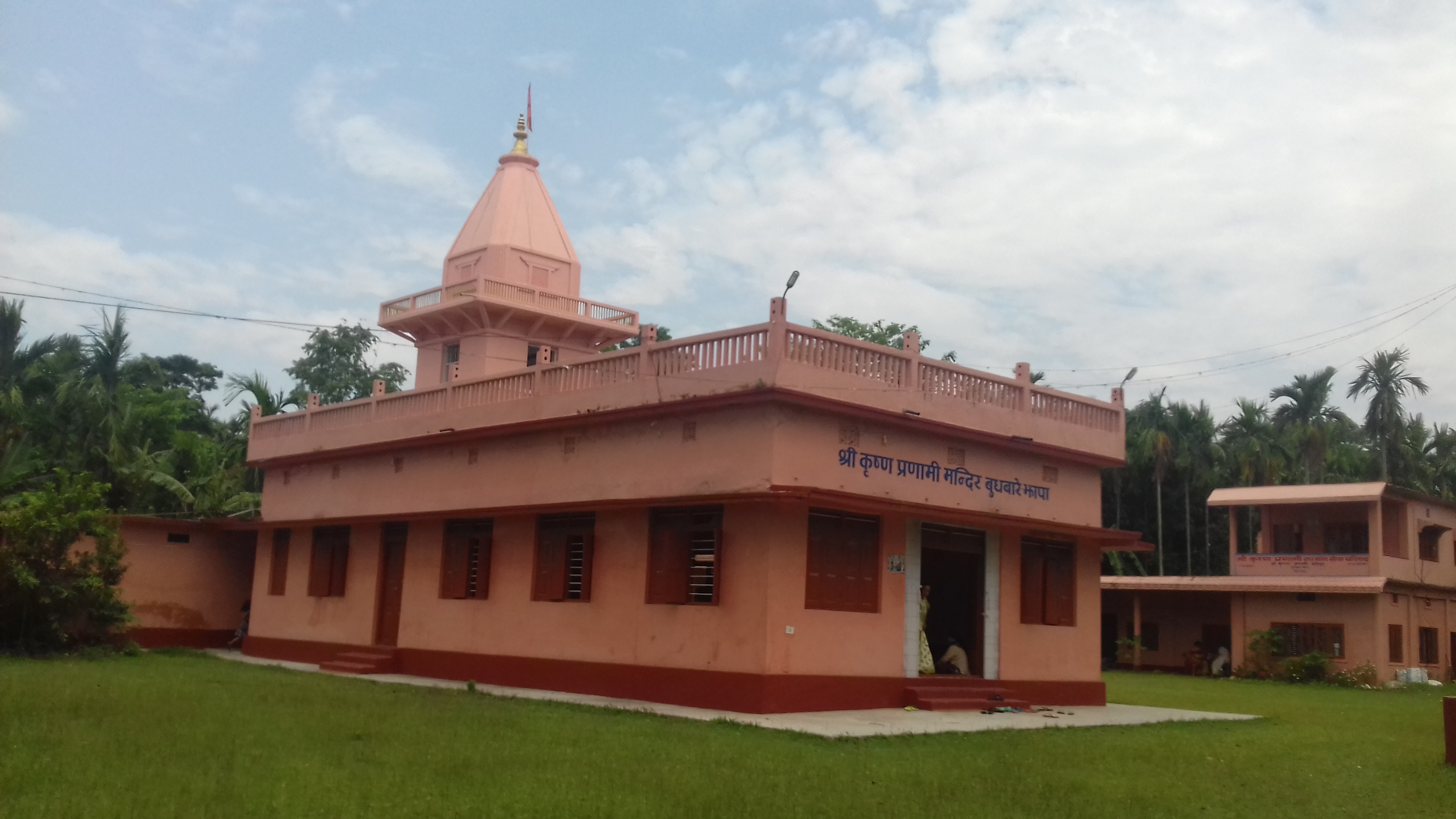
Krishna Pranami Mandir, in Madhya Pradesh and Buddhashanti, Nepal.

=== Tartam Sagar ===
The Tartam Sagar, also referred to as the Kuljam Swaroop, is the holy book of the Pranami tradition. It is a compilation of 14 books; Raas, Prakash, Shatritu, Kalash, Sanandh, Kirantan, Khulasa, Khilwat, Parikrama, Sagar, Singaar, Sindhi Bani, Marfat Sagar, and Kayamatnama (chhota and bada), consisting of 18,758 verses. The text was published in 1965 for the first time. It is regarded to contain the revelation of the Vedic scriptures, as well as the description of the supreme abode of Krishna, called paraṃadhāma or Goloka Vrindavan. The text is regarded to be divine, and is therefore accorded equivalent worship as Krishna.

== Rites and rituals ==
The tradition is strictly vegetarian (ahimsa, non-violence to animals), non-caste tradition dedicated to Supreme Lord whom they also call as "Rajji". Dedicated Pranami temples exist such as in Kathiawar and Gulf of Kutch region, but followers of Pranami traditions substitute it by praying and spiritual pursuits in any nearby convenient temples. There are an estimated 5-10 million Pranamis found primarily throughout North India, particularly the states of Gujarat, Rajasthan, Punjab, Madhya Pradesh, Haryana, Uttar Pradesh, West Bengal (Darjeeling, Kalimpong and Sikkim), and Assam, as well as the eastern half of Nepal.

=== Nepal ===
The Pranami Sampradaya has a significant presence in eastern Nepal. The Shree Krishna Pranami Temple in Itahari, established in 1978, is described as a pilgrimage site that attracts devotees from across Nepal. The temple was substantially reconstructed in 2018 and serves as a religious and community centre. Its activities include devotional gatherings, scripture recitation and religious education, as well as services for elderly people and children. The temple and the adjacent Budhiganga-Jamuna Muktighat have also contributed to the area's development as a religious and cultural tourism destination.

Pranami religious organisations have also organised large-scale religious events in Nepal. In 2023, an international Pranami religious festival was held at the Shree Krishna Pranami Temple in Katunje, Bhaktapur, attracting devotees from Nepal and several other countries.

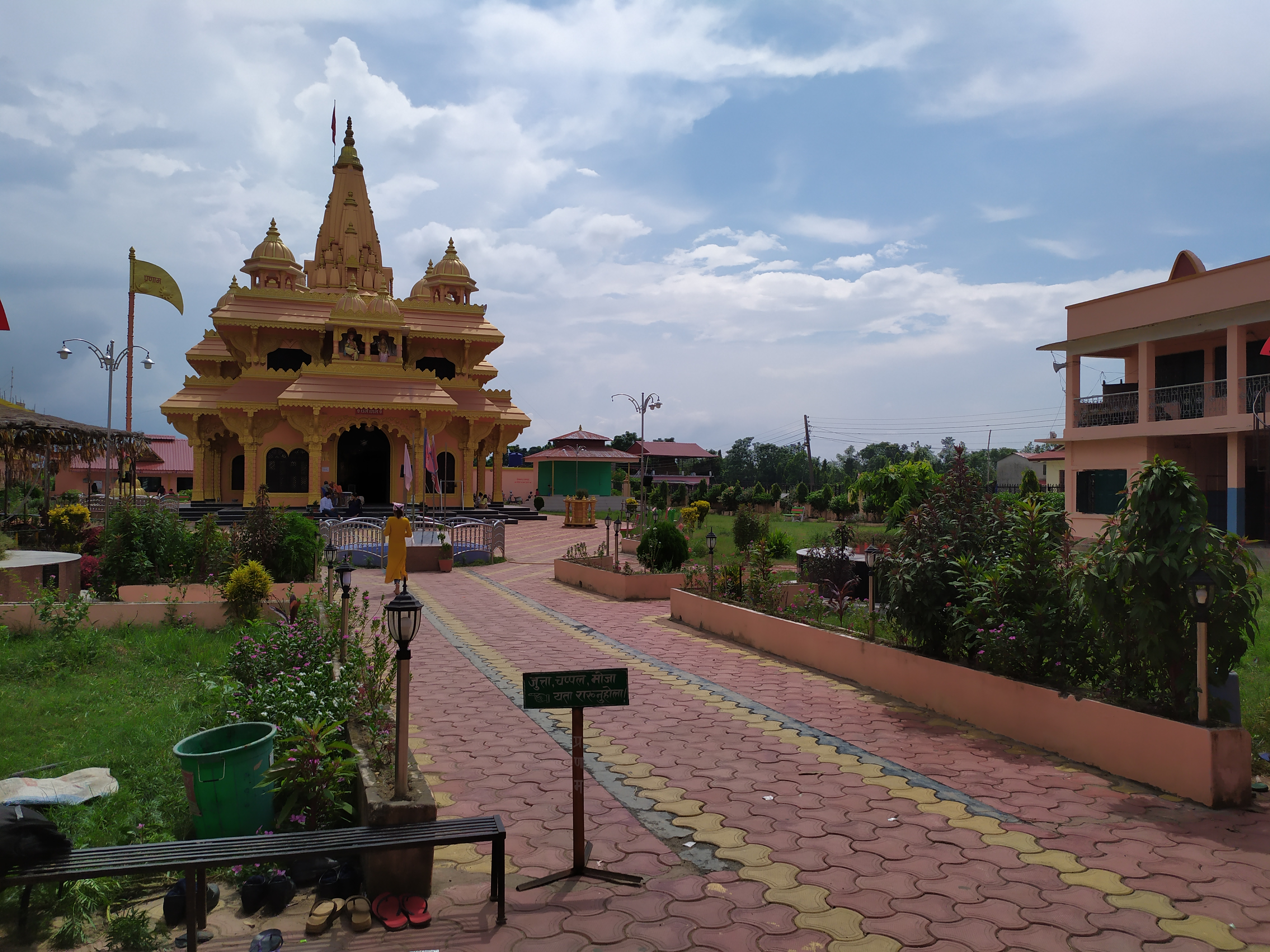
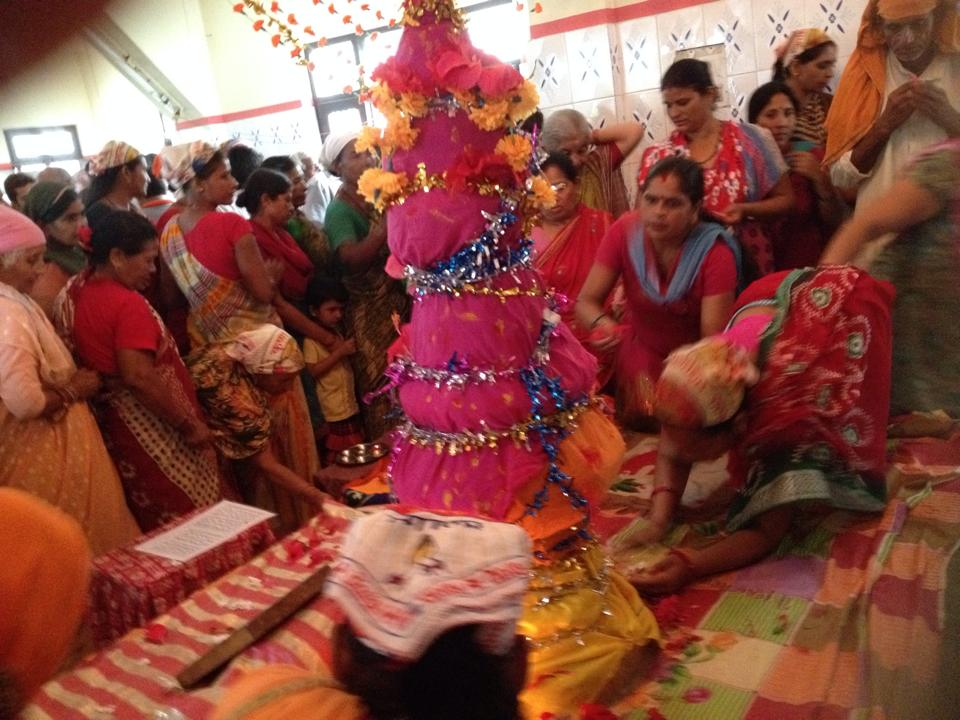
Images and devotees at Shri Krishna Pranami temples.
