= Siddha Siddhanta =

Shaivite philosophical tradition

Siddha Siddhanta is one of the six main Shaivite philosophical traditions. It is also known as Gorakshanatha Saivism after its founding Guru Gorakhnath.
