= Sikhism in Bangladesh =

Bangladeshi Sikhs বাংলাদেশী শিখ ਬੰਗਲਾਦੇਸ਼ ਵਿੱਚ ਸਿੱਖ ਧਰਮ
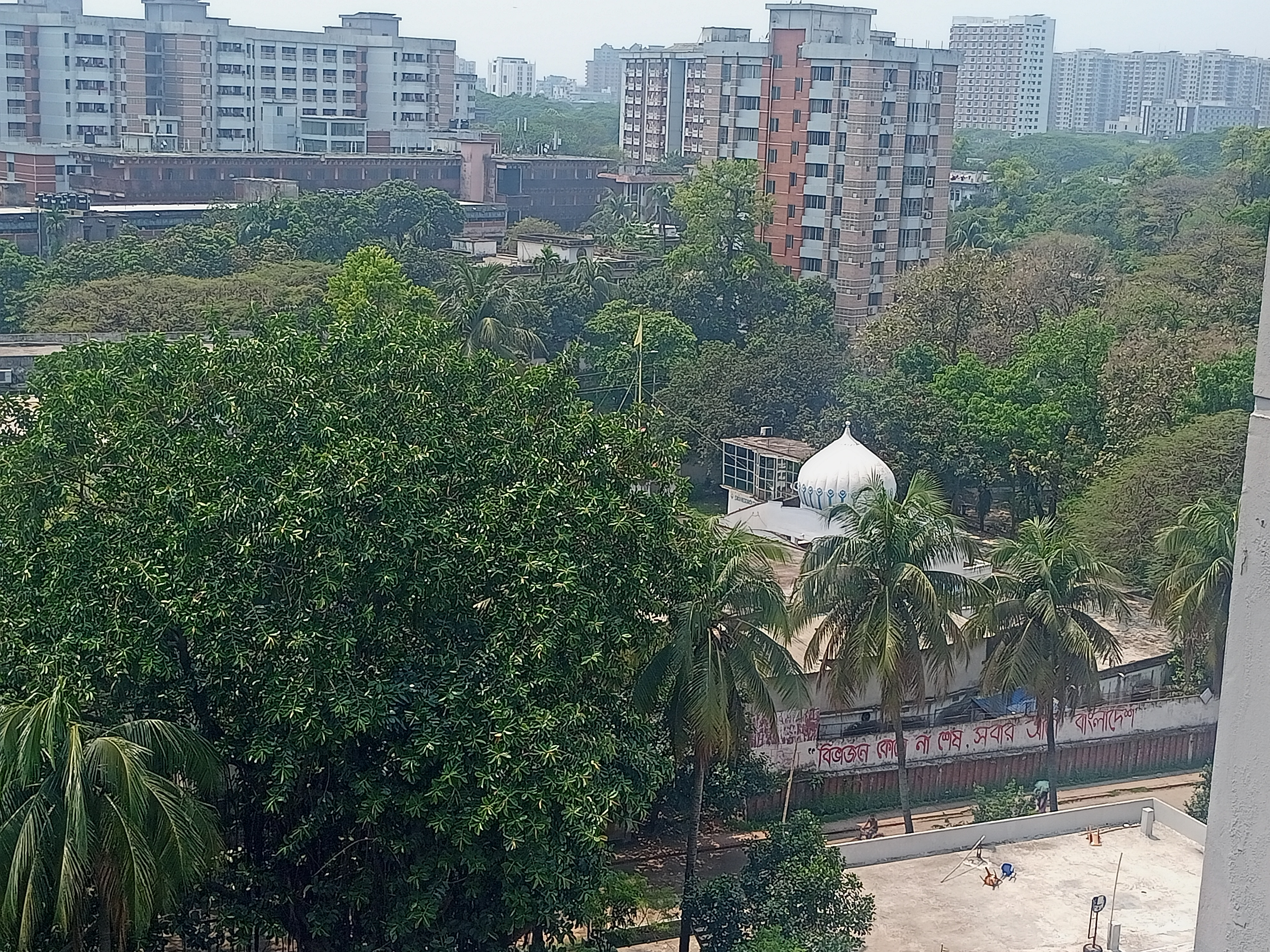
- Gurdwara Nanak Shahi in Dhaka

Total population
- 23,000

Founder
- Guru Nanak

Regions with significant populations
- Dhaka · Chittagong · Mymensingh · Sylhet

Religions
- Sikhism (Nanakpanthi)

Scriptures
- Guru Granth Sahib

Languages
- Sant Bhasha (sacred); Punjabi (cultural); Bengali (national); Hindi • Urdu

Related ethnic groups
- Sikhism in India (Eastern India)

Sikhism in Bangladesh has an extensive heritage and history, although Sikhs had always been a minority community in Bengal. Their founder, Guru Nanak visited a number of places in Bengal in the early sixteenth century where he introduced Sikhism to locals and founded numerous establishments.

In its early history, the Sikh gurus despatched their followers to propagate Sikh teachings in Bengal and issued hukamnamas to that region, with Udasi preachers converting locals to Sikhism. Guru Tegh Bahadur lived in Bengal for two years, and his successor Guru Gobind Singh also visited the region.

Sikhism in Bengal continued to exist during the colonial period as Sikhs found employment in the region, but it declined after the partition in 1947. Among the eighteen historical gurdwaras (worship places of the Sikhs) in Bangladesh, only five are extant. The Gurdwara Nanak Shahi of Dhaka is the principal and largest gurdwara in the country. The Sikh population in the country almost entirely consists of businessmen and government officials from the neighbouring Republic of India.

== History ==
Sikhism first emerged in Bengal when its founder, Guru Nanak, visited the Bengal Sultanate in 1504 during the reign of Sultan Alauddin Husain Shah. Guru Nanak's visit to Bengal in the early 16th century is corroborated in Sikh hagiographical literature, alongside local traditions. He passed through Kantanagar and Sylhet. Kahn Singh Nabha credits the establishment of Gurdwara Sahib Sylhet to Nanak himself. Mughal courtier Abu'l-Fazl ibn Mubarak also records in his Akbarnama that Nanak had entered Sylhet from Kamrup with his followers. He further narrates a story in which a faqir (Sufi ascetic) called Nur Shah transmorphed Nanak's senior companion Bhai Mardana into a lamb although Nanak was able to undo the spell later on.

Nanak then sailed into Dhaka, where he stopped at the village of Shivpur and also visited Faridpur. He first preached to the potters of Rayer Bazaar, for whom he dug and consecrated a well in Jafarabad village for. Nanak was also said to have constructed a gurdwara in Jafarabad. The ruins of the well in Jafarabad is still visited by Sikhs, who believe that its waters have curative powers. Nanak then left Dhaka as he intended to travel to Calcutta and subsequently the Deccan. He passed through Chittagong, where he established a manji (religious headquarter) in Chawkbazar and made Bhai Jhanda its first masand. Raja Sudhir Sen of Chittagong converted to Sikhism as a result of his converted son, Indra Singh, and became a disciple of Guru Nanak. This manji later became the Chittagong Gurdwara (Joy Nagar Lane, Panchlaish) through the effort of Dewan Mohan Singh, the Bihari-Sikh dewan of the Nawab of Bengal Murshid Quli Khan. The Nawab had also allowed the entire property to be rent-free. The Dewan also established the Gurdwara of English Road in Dhaka which later collapsed.

During the guruship of Guru Amar Das, preachers were dispatched to the Bengal region and congregations (sangats) of Sikhs were established. The Guru Granth Sahib compiled by Guru Arjan features poetry attributed to Jayadeva, which some claim was from Bengal. Baba Gurditta later visited Bengal, where he established a manji in Shujatpur (presently the University of Dhaka campus) which Gurditta traced to be the location in which Nanak resided during his stay in Bengal. During the reign of Mughal emperor Jahangir, Guru Hargobind dispatched Bhai Natha (Bhai Almast's successor) to Bengal, who dug another well and also laid the foundation stone for the Shujatpur Sikh Sangat, a religious congregation. The sangat commemorated the footsteps of Guru Nanak. Dalbir Singh Dhillon claims that the sixth guru had dispatched Bhai Almast to conduct missionary work in Bengal, whose original work was carried-on by Bhai Natha by the time of the ninth Sikh guru, Tegh Bahadur.

Guru Tegh Bahadur stayed in Dhaka between 1666 and 1668 after visiting Assam. During this time, Bulaki Das was the masand (Sikh minister) of Dhaka. He established the Gurdwara Sangat Tola (14 Sreesh Das Lane), then referred to as a dharamsaal, in Bangla Bazar. His wooden sandals are preserved at the Gurdwara Nanak Shahi. He also visited the Gurdwara Sahib Sylhet twice. His successor, Guru Gobind Singh, issued many hukamnamas to the Sylhet temple and also visited Dhaka. The Gurdwara Sahib Sylhet provided war elephants for him too. Whilst Guru Tegh Bahadur was residing in Dhaka, Sikh pilgrims from congregations located in Sylhet, Sondip, Chittagong travelled to the guru's location to obtain darshan of him. Guru Gobind Singh is also purported to have visited Dhaka at some point.

By the early 18th century, there were a few Sikhs living in the region of Bengal. One famous Sikh who lived during this time period was Omichand, a local Khatri Sikh banker and landlord who participate in the conspiracy against Nawab Siraj ud-Daulah with the East India Company. The Flemish artist Frans Baltazard Solvyns arrived in Calcutta in 1791 and observed many Sikhs, whom one could differentiate from the rest of the land's inhabitants by their garbs and traditions. He etched depictions of a Khalsa Sikh and a Nanakpanthi, which was published in 1799.

Over time, the Shujatpur sangat developed into what is now the Gurdwara Nanak Shahi from 1830 onwards. Under the initiative of Mahant Prem Daas, Bhai Nattha's well was reformed in 1833. A large number of Sikhs found employment with the Assam Bengal Railway and a gurdwara was established for them in Pahartali, Chittagong. The Gurdwara Sahib Sylhet was destroyed as result of the 1897 earthquake. The Sangat Sutrashashi at Urdu Road was later destroyed by the Sutra Sadhus. There is also a gurdwara in Banigram, Banshkhali.

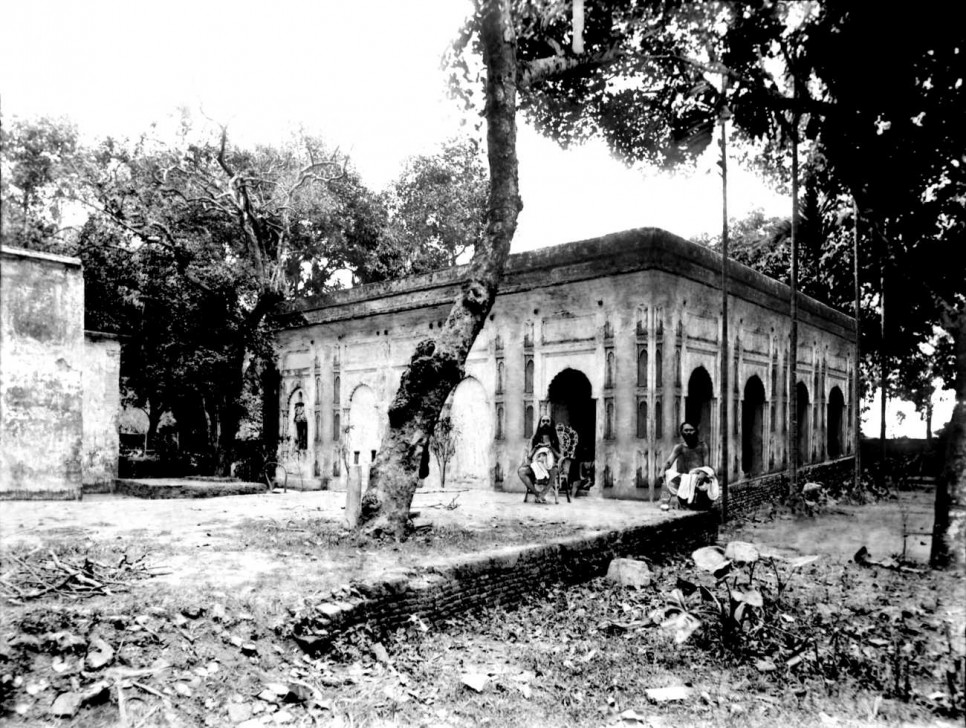
Photograph of Gurdwara Nanak Shahi in Nilkhet, Dhaka Bangladesh, 1950. The man seated on the ornate, wicker chair with his long, loose hair after a bath may be the local granthi Swaran Singh, who was later murdered during the 1971 unrest.

In 1945, Sikhs established the Gurdwara Guru Nanak Sahib in Mymensingh which continues to be used by ten local families today. A Bengali Sikh called Here Singh was appointed as its inaugural chief. From 1915 to 1947, Sri Chandrajyoti served as the granthi of Gurdwara Nanak Shahi in Dhaka. After the Independence of Pakistan, most of the Sikh community left for the Dominion of India and the Dhaka gurdwara was looked after by Bhai Swaran Singh. The Government of Pakistan requisitioned this part of Jafarabad under Sikh supervision until 1959. After the Indo-Pakistani War of 1971 and Bangladesh Liberation War, Indian Sikh soldiers helped renovate the extant gurdwaras of Bangladesh including the Gurdwara Nanak Shahi. A handwritten copy of the Guru Granth Sahib from the time of Guru Arjan was kept at the Gurdwara Sangat Tola and later moved to the Gurdwara Nanak Shahi in 1985.

During floods in the country, Sikh organizations such as Sampardai Kaar Sewa Sarhali Sahib run by Sukha Singh, have donated to the government of Sheikh Hasina for the purpose of humanitarian causes.

The Guru Granth Sahib has not been fully translated into Bengali, however selections from it have been translated into Bengali by Rabindranath Tagore (a couple of shlokas of Guru Nanak), Jnanendranath Datta (in prose), and Kiranchand Dervish (in verse). A two-volume translation of parts of the scripture by Haranchandra Chakladar was published in 1957 and 1962 as Shri Shri Gurugrantha Sahibji.

== Demographics ==
The Sikh population almost entirely consists of Punjabi businessmen and government officials from the neighbouring Republic of India. These Sikhs mostly reside in Dhaka, Chittagong, and Sylhet and come from abroad and only stay temporarily. There exists a small ancient Balmiki community who retain fluency in the Punjabi language from the time of Guru Nanak. Thus, they can read the Guru Granth Sahib. Despite the direct propagation from four of the Sikh gurus, the religion was unable to profoundly influence the Bengali people due to its seemingly Punjabi-centric nature. Sikh soldiers were posted in Bengal during the British Raj but they mostly kept to themselves and did not extensively interact with local Bengalis due to differing language, culture, and religion.

== Gurdwaras ==
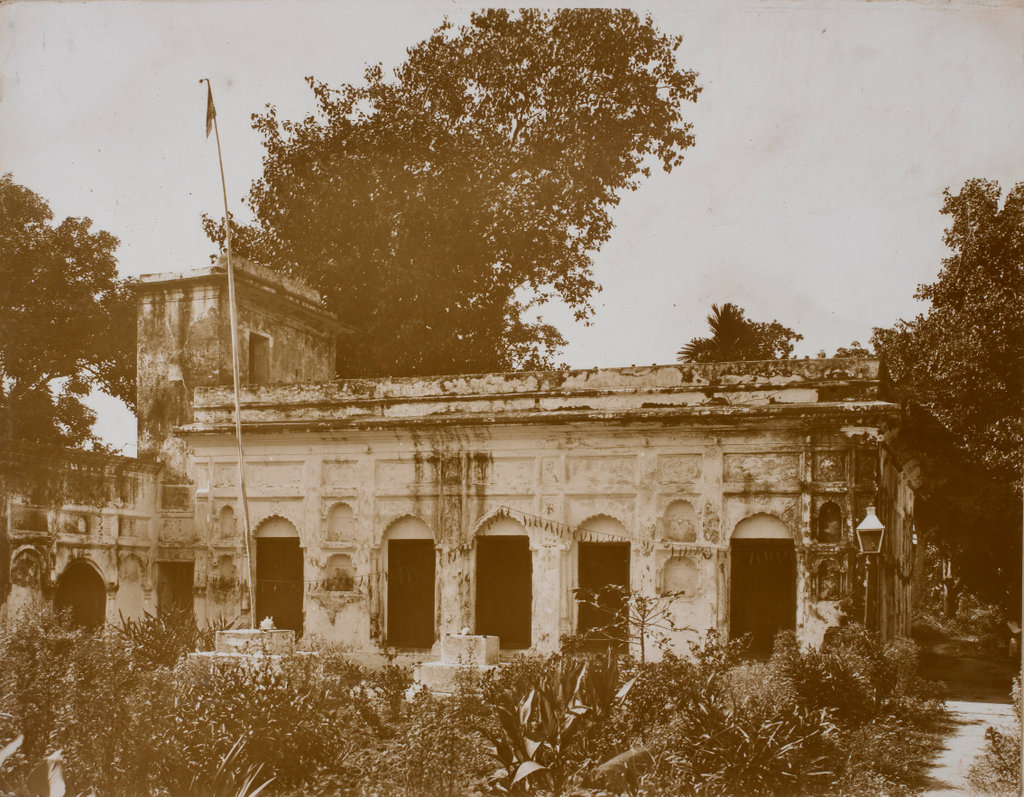
Photograph of a Sikh temple [Gurdwara Nanak Shahi] at Dacca (Dhaka) in Bengal, British India (now Bangladesh), circa 1920–21

The gurdwaras in the country are managed by the Gurdwara Management Committee Bangladesh, whose current president is Amar Chand. According to Sukomal Barua, former president of the committee, during the period of the British Raj, there were purportedly eighteen gurdwaras located in what is now Bangladesh. The gurdwaras that Nanak had established as per lore at Jafrabad is no longer extant, nor is the excavated a pond for drinking water he constructed for potters at Rayer Bazar in Dhaka. Presently, five gurdwaras remain operational in the country. Two are located in Dhaka, another two in Chittagong, and one in Mymensingh. Aside from Gurdwara Nanak Shahi, the remaining four gurdwaras of the country lay in a decaying and neglected state. Waqar A. Khan claims there are around seven gurdwaras remaining in the country, including in Sylhet besides the three aforementioned locations. Meanwhile, Sambaru Chandra Mohanta claims there are nine to ten gurdwaras remaining in the country.

Gurdwara Pahar Tali in Chittagong was originally constructed for the purpose of being used by Sikh railway employees. In 1945, the gurdwara of Mymensingh was constructed and located at Ganjer Park, beside a Kali mandir, and Heera Singh, a local Bengali Sikh, was appointed as the gurdwara supervisor. However, the local Sikh population of Mymensingh relocated to India following the 1947 partition, leaving no one behind to care for the site.

After the independence of Bangladesh in 1971, the Bangladesh Gurdwara Management Board was granted control of all the gurdwaras in the country, including the central Gurdwara Nanak Shahi of Dhaka. In 1972, the board appointed Kartar Singh, head priest of Gurdwara Nanak Shahi, to perform the daily religious functions.

The Sampardai Kar Sewa Sarhali Sahib has been carrying-out kar seva renovations at five historical Bangladeshi gurdwaras since 2004 under the purview of Sukha Singh, with the organization being granted permission to-do so by the Bangladesh Gurdwara Management Committee. In circa 2011, it was reported that Sukha Singh of the Sampardai Kar Sewa Sarhali Sahib appointed eight ragis and granthis to carry-out religious services at the gurdwara. Mostly local Bengali Hindus and some Bengali Muslims attend the daily services of the gurdwaras, as Bangladesh lacks a local Sikh population. Furthermore, two Punjabi schools were constructed, one at Dhaka and the other in Chittagong.

A Sikh Research Centre (SRC) at Gurdwara Nanak Shahi was set up with Dhaka University professor Nirol Kazi as its head. Around 50 Muslims students were reportedly students of the SRC.

During the 2024 unrest, there were concerns that the gurdwaras would be targeted as part of the anti-Hindu violence, however none of the five gurdwaras of Bangladesh were attacked as per local Sikh leaders. The gates of the gurdwaras were shut and prayers were held on a daily-basis during the unrest.

Most local attendees of the gurdwaras in Bangladesh hail from the Balmiki community, whom are characterized as being followers of Guru Nanak.

=== List of operational gurdwaras in Bangladesh ===
- Gurdwara Sangat Tola – located in Bangla Bazaar, Dhaka
- Gurdwara Nanak Shahi – located in Shujatpur, Dhaka
- Gurdwara Pahar Tali – located in Punjabi Lane, Chittagong
- Gurdwara Sikh Temple Estate – located in Chittagong
- Gurdwara Guru Nanak Mandir – located in Mymensingh

=== List of defunct gurdwaras in Bangladesh ===
- A Sikh gurdwara, originally established as a manji, was located in Chowkbazar in Chittagong
- A gurdwara supposedly founded by Guru Nanak was found in Sylhet
- A gurdwara was located on English Road, originally constructed by a Sikh youth named Mohan Singh, it later collapsed
- Sangat Shutrashasi – temple belonging to the Suthrashahi sub-sect of the Udasi sect was once located in Urdu Bazaar, but Suthrashahi sadhus later destroyed it themselves
- A gurdwara apparently established by Guru Nanak was located in Jafrabad, no longer extant
