= Gurdwara Sangat Tola =

- গুরুদুয়ারা সঙ্গতটোলা
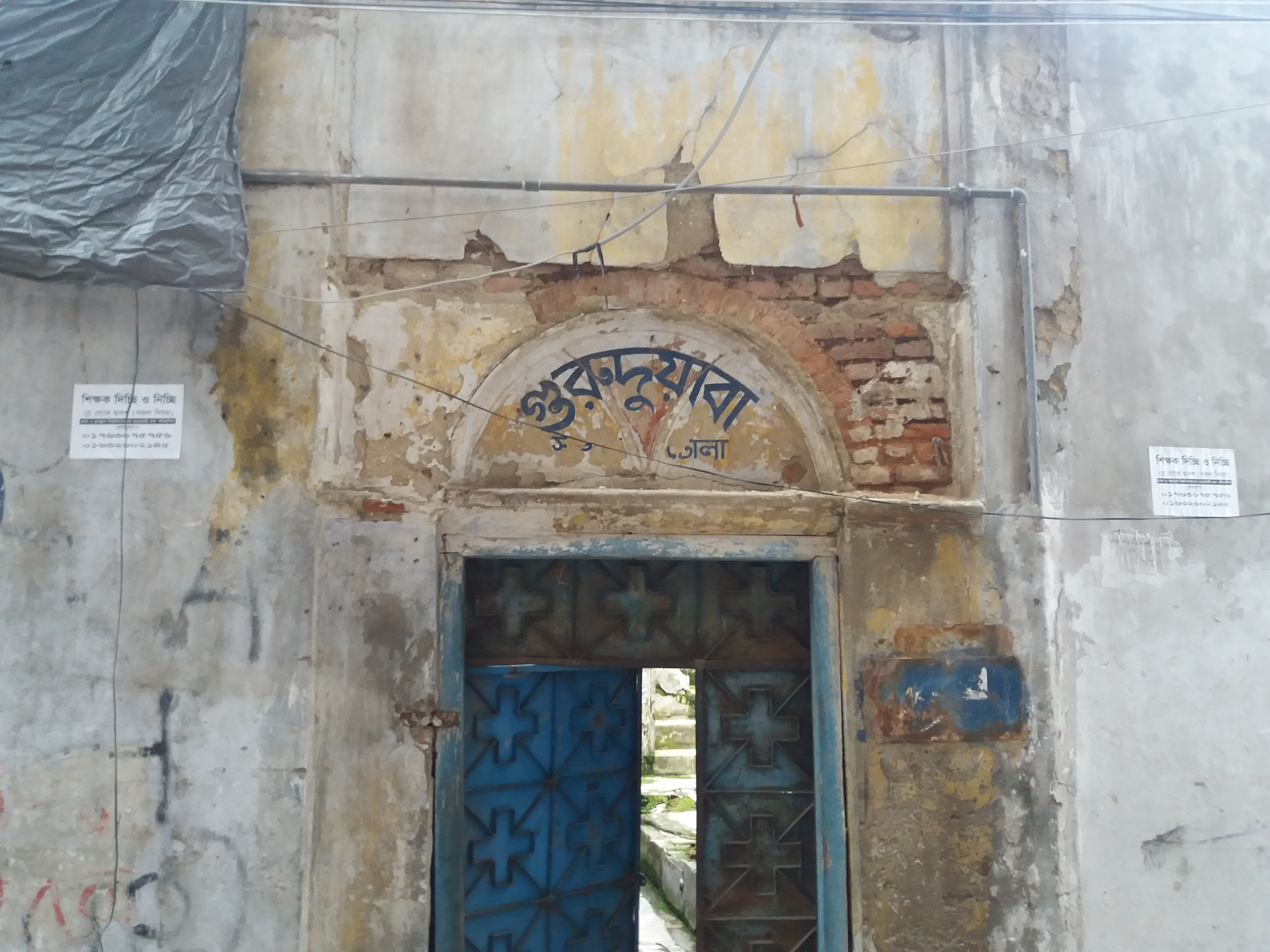
- The door of Gurudwara Sangat Tola

General information
- Type: Temple
- Architectural style: Two-storied building
- Location: 14 Sreesh Das Lane, Bangla Bazar, Dhaka, Bangladesh, Dhaka, Bangladesh
- Completed: c. 1666–1668
- Owner: Gurdwara Management Committee Bangladesh

Gurdwara Sangat Tola is a Sikh temple in Dhaka, the capital of Bangladesh. It is located at 14 Sreesh Das Lane, Bangla Bazar in Dhaka. The gurdwara was purportedly founded by Guru Tegh Bahadur in the late 1660's. It is currently managed by the Gurdwara Management Committee Bangladesh and remains in a neglected and decaying state.

== History ==
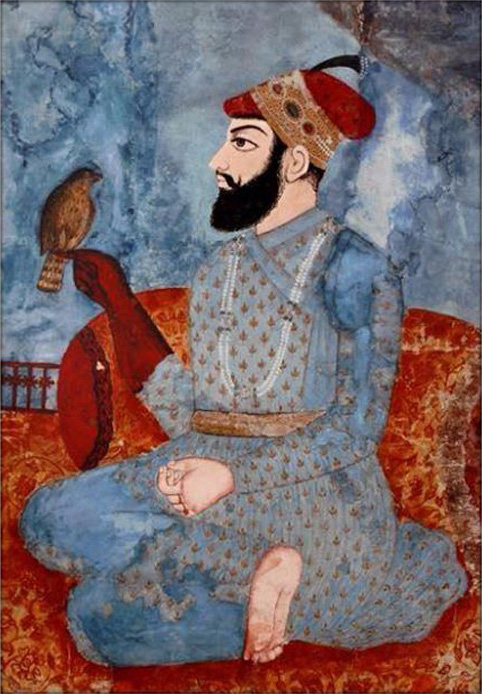
Contemporary painting of Guru Tegh Bahadur by Ahsan, ca.1668. It was painted at Gurdwara Sangat Tola as per research conducted by Trilochan Singh.

The ninth Sikh guru, Guru Tegh Bahadur, came to Dhaka from Assam and resided there between the years 1666–1668. He built Gurdwara Sangat Tola in Bangla Bazar during his stay. The shrine was originally constructed as a dharamsaal located at Tola Mahalla in old Dhaka. A painter from the court of governor Shaista Khan, named Ahsan, painted a portrait of the Guru during his stay at this gurdwara.

In 1985, a handwritten and illustrated Guru Granth Sahib manuscript kept at the site was moved to Guru Nanak Shahi, also in Dhaka.

== Architecture ==
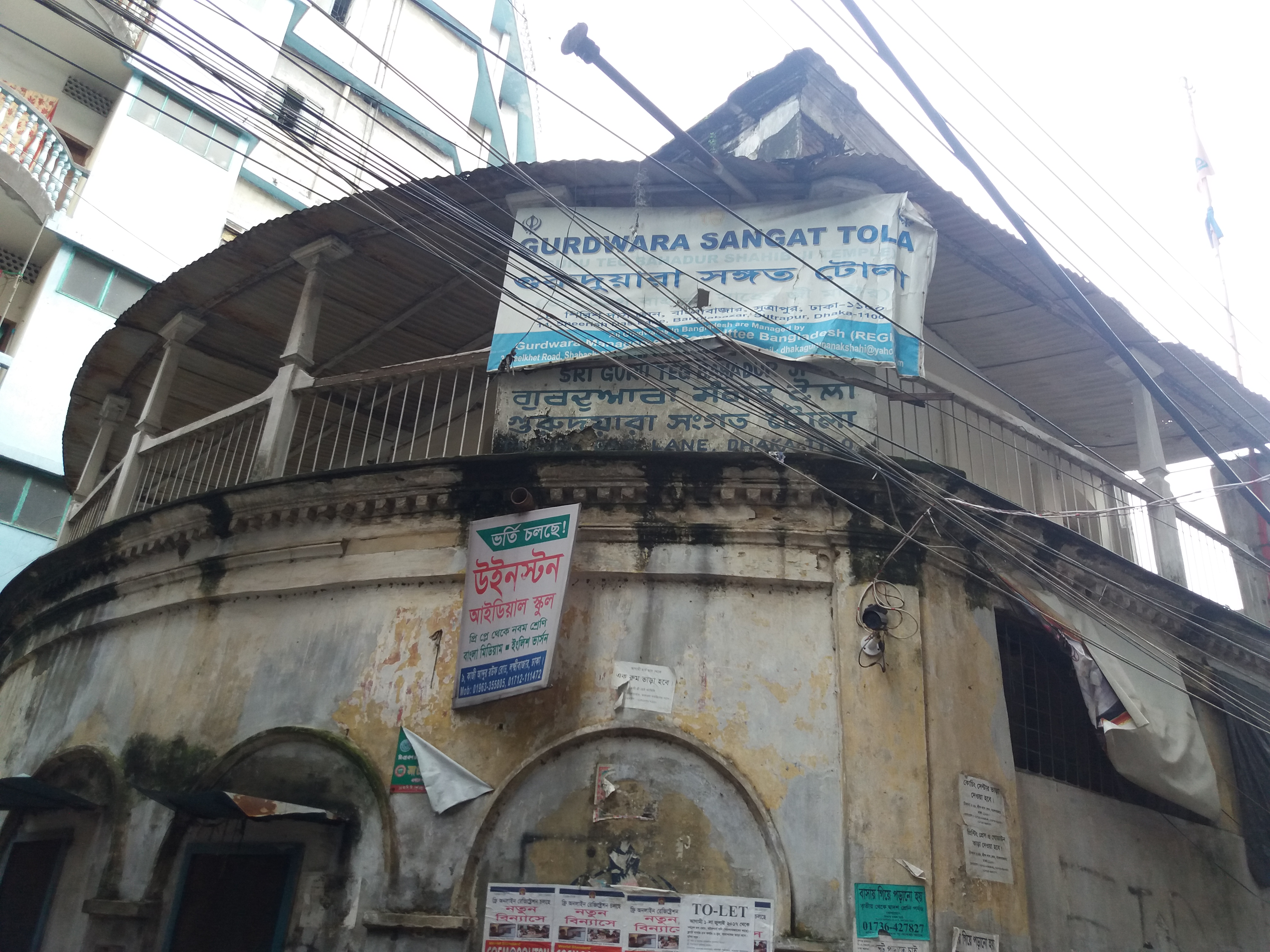
Exterior of Gurdwara Sangat Tola, Banglabazar, Dhaka, 2017

It is estimated that the oldest building of the Sangat Tola no longer exists. Currently it's a two-storied building and it has round balcony that is visible from the outside. Signs of disk and sword are painted on the wall. Besides the stairs, a broken part of a wide wall can be found which indicates that there used to be one or more rooms in that area of the building. On the second floor, there's a prayer room for Sikhs. The holy book of Sikhs is kept in the prayer room. Also, paintings of Guru Tegh Bahadur are preserved here.

== Current state ==
The temple of more than 350 years is now abandoned. Some people obtained some part of it illegally. The cover on the walls of the office room on the ground floor is no longer functional. The walls to the right of the stairs is broken since many days. This old building is not listed in the list of archaeological finds or in any other preservation list.

== Management and activities ==
Volunteers of Gurdwara Nanak Shahi look after this Sangat Tola. Every morning a gronthy (a person who says preyer) says preyer. Also every Saturday a Kirtan (song to praise god or maybe religion) is held. Five Gurudwaras in Bangladesh including Gurudwara Sangat Tola is administrated by Gurudwara Management Committee Bangladesh (IGD) with coordinated help from a service organization in Punjab, India called Sampardai Kar Seba. A religious organization of Sikhism in India, "Karseba Sarhali" provides fund to run Gurudwaras.

== See also ==
- Sikhism
- Sikhism in India
- Sikhism in Pakistan
- Sikhism in Afghanistan
- Sikhism in the United States
- Sikhism in the United Kingdom
- Sikhism in Canada
