= Pir Budhan Shah =

Sufi pir

Pir Buddan Shah
- پیر بدھن علی شاہ
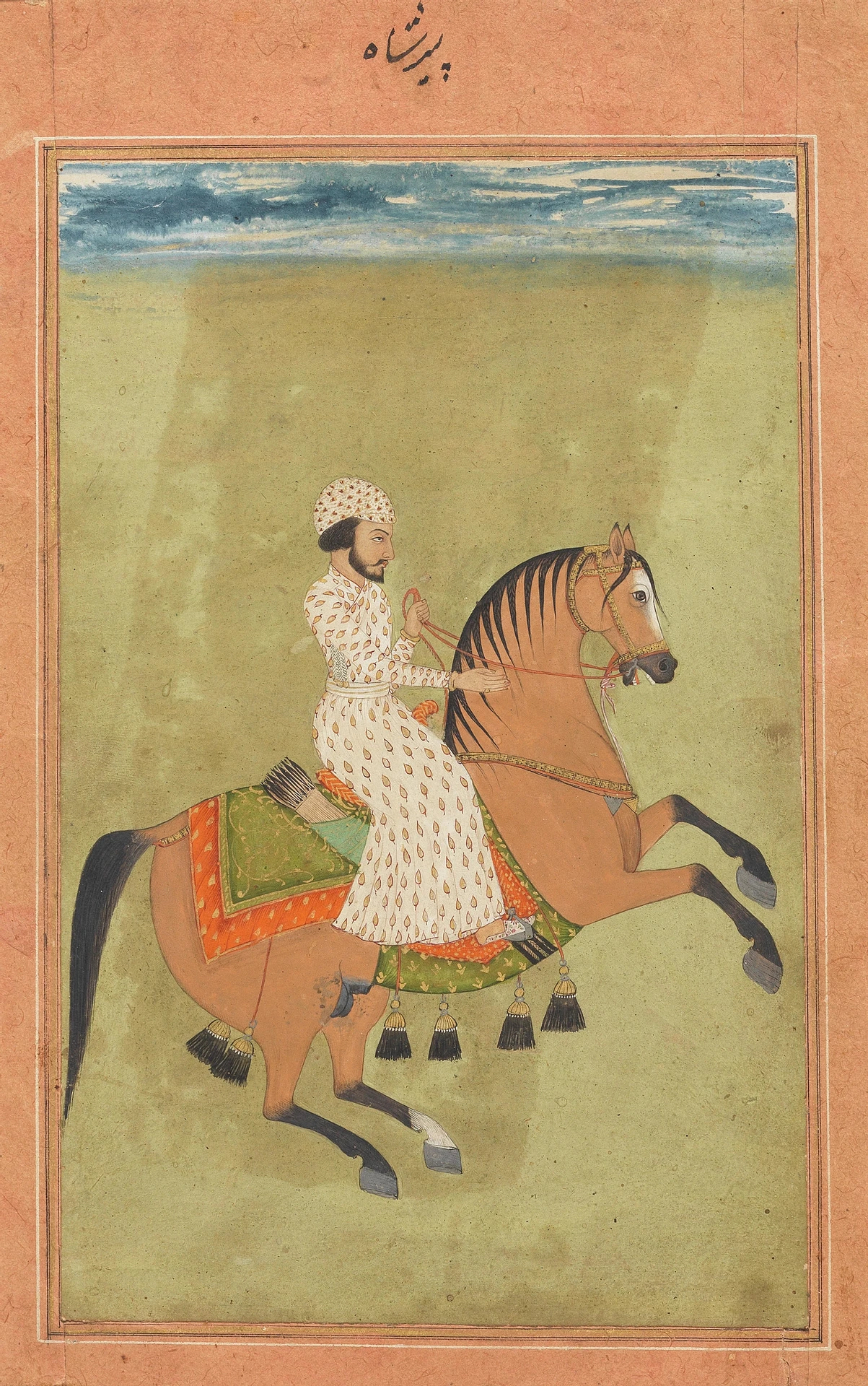
- Equestrian miniature painting of Pir Budhan Shah. Gouache and gold on paper, circa 18th or 19th century

Personal life
- Died: 1643 Kiratpur Sahib
- Known for: Associate of the Sikh Gurus

Religious life
- Religion: Islam

Pir Budhan Shah (Note: His name is also romanised as Peer Buddan Shah.) (died 1643; پیر بدھن علی شاہ), also called Baba Budhan Ali Shah, Peer Baba, and Sayyed Shamsuddin, was a venerated Sufi pir who held a religious discourse with Guru Nanak in Rawalpindi and later accepted Gurmat thought during the times of Guru Hargobind. He was a Sufi Muslim by birth he was born in Talwandi, the same village as Guru Nanak. He is venerated by Sikhs, Muslims, and Hindus. It is believed that he lived for around 500 years.

== Renunciation ==
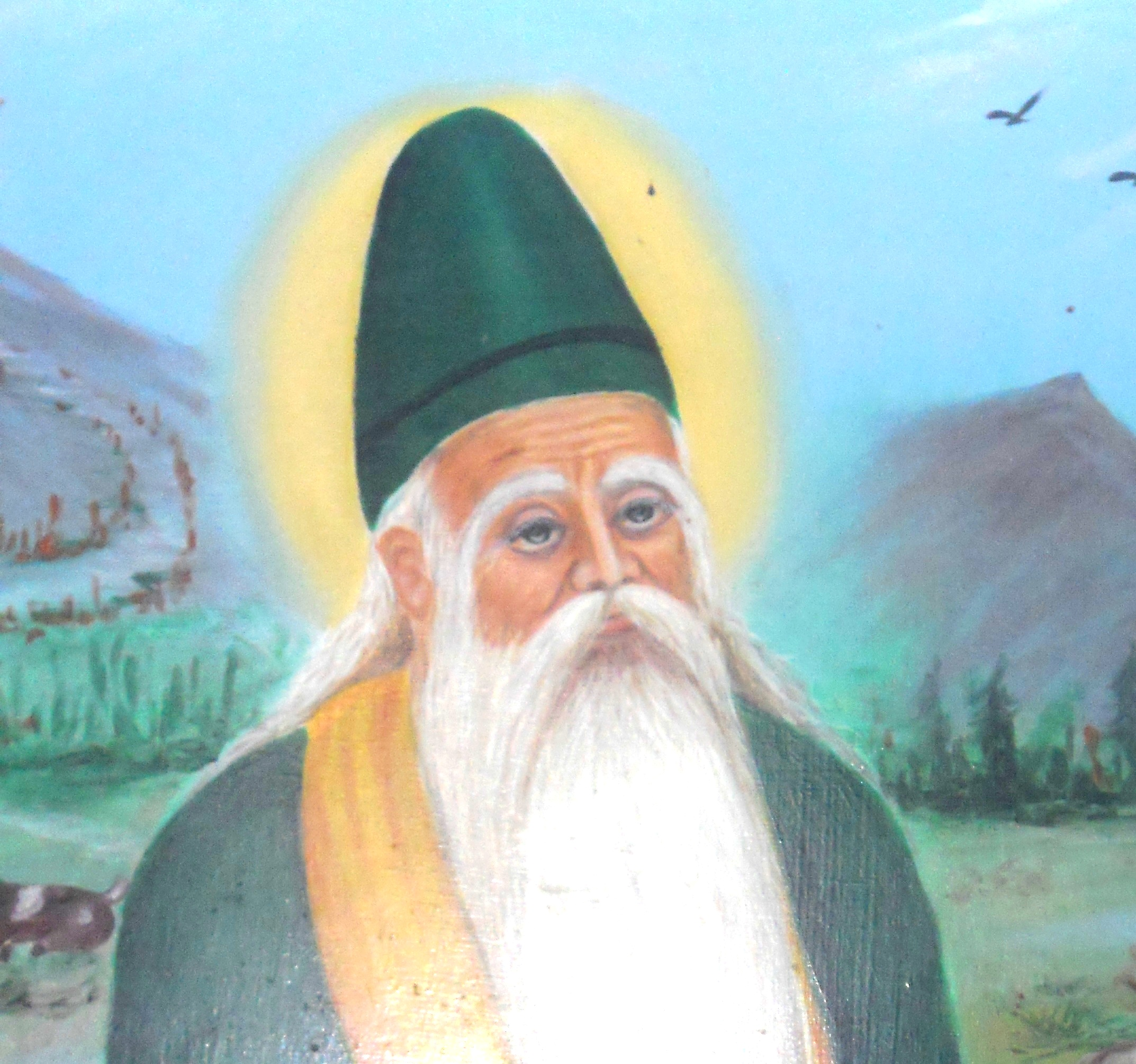
Painting of the Pir located at his mausoleum in Kiratpur

Buddan Shah, a Muhammedan, belonged to a family of chieftains, but left everything to become a Sufi mystic. He lived near Rawalpindi. Guru Nanak met him during his travels. He is believed to have arrived in Jammu sometime during the 15th century.

He was very close to Bidhi Chand Chhina, as were his followers. His disciple, Sunder Shah, died together with Bidhi Chand at Devnagar near Ayodhya on the banks of the Gomti River in 1638.

== Death ==
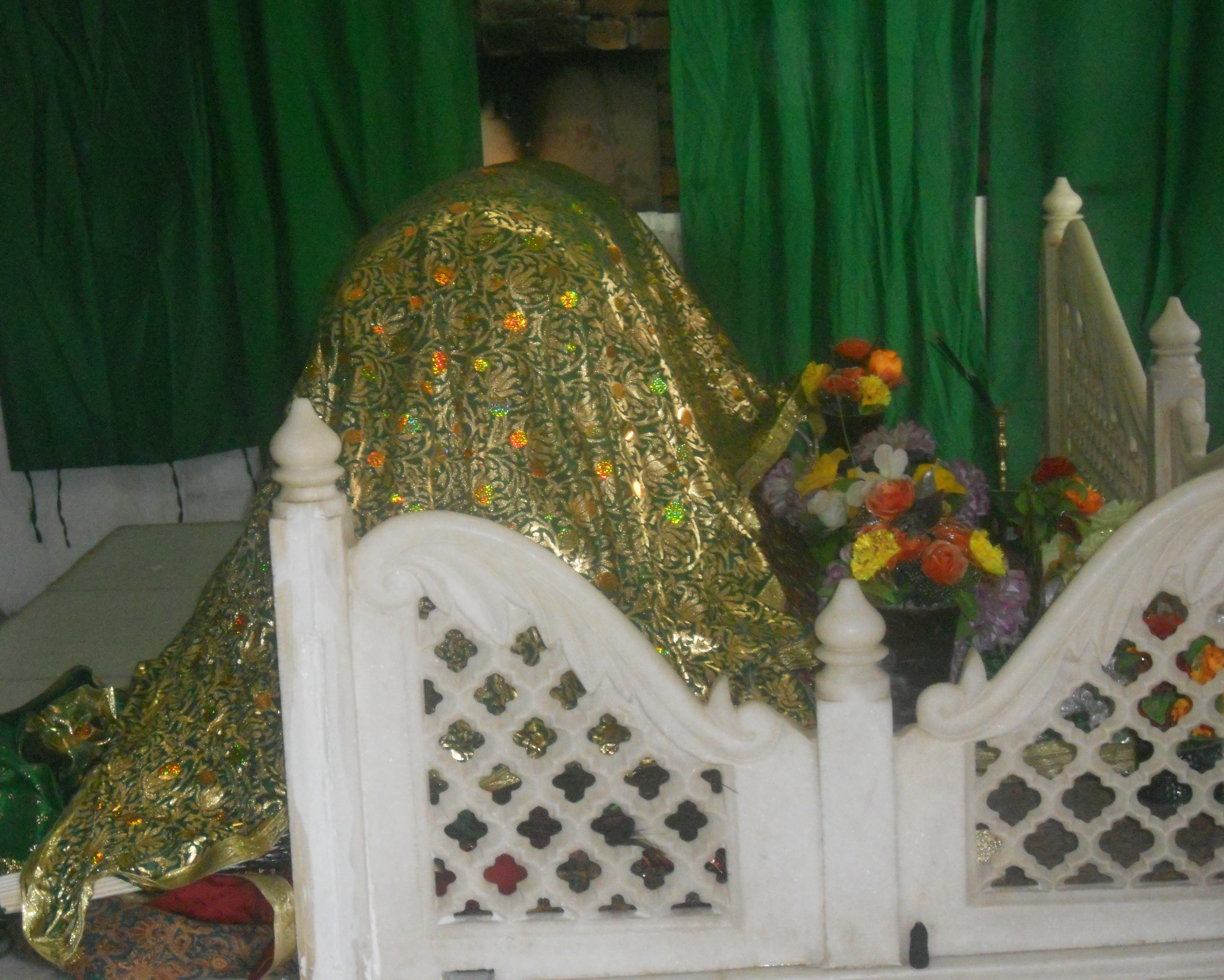
Mausoleum of Pir Buddan Shah at Kiratpur

Budhan Shah lived up to the time of Guru Hargobind and died in 1643. His mausoleum is located on hilltop in Kiratpur, about 200 meters east of the ashram of Baba Gurditta. His tomb is visited by both the Sikhs and Muslims of the region. A dargah (shrine) dedicated to him is located in Jammu City, across the Tawi River from the local Jammu Airport.
