= Bhai Balu Hasna =

Sikh preacher (1564-1660)

Personal life
- Born: Balu; 13 November 1564 Srinagar, Kashmir Sultanate (Present-day Jammu and Kashmir, India)
- Died: 2 December 1660 (aged 96) Peshawar, Kabul Subah, Mughal Empire (Present-day Khyber Pakhtunkhwa, Pakistan)
- Parent(s): Pt. Hardatt (father); Mai Prabha (mother)

Religious life
- Religion: Sikhism
- Sect: Udasi

Religious career
- Based in: Pothohar

Bhai Balu Hasna (13 November 1564 – 2 December 1660), also known as Hamsa or Hasa, was a Sikh preacher and leader of a branch of the Udasi sampradaya active in the 17th century. He was the younger brother of Bhai Almast. He was one of the four Adi-Udasis. His missionary centre was active in Kartarpur, Pothohar, and Peshawar. His tradition later co-opted the Ramraiyans of Dehradun.

== Early life ==
Balu Hasna was born as Balu on 13 November 1564 to a Gaur Brahmin family of Srinagar (Kashmir) to Pandit Hardatt and Mai Prabha.

== Career ==
Initially named Balu, he travelled with his elder brother Alu, also known as Bhai Almast, to receive teachings from Guru Arjan in Amritsar in 1604. Balu devoted himself to serving the Guru, and later accompanied Guru Hargobind, who have him the appellation Hasna, meaning the laughing one, due to Balu being of a cheerful and smiling nature and disposition. At the request of Guru Hargobind, Bhai Balu Hasna joined Baba Gurditta, the Guru's eldest son and spiritual successor of Baba Sri Chand, the founder of the Udasi sect. Baba Gurditta instructed him to spread Sikhism in the Pothohar region. Balu Hasna continued this mission until his death in Peshawar on 2 December 1660.

Balu Hasna is believed to have written a Mātrā which claims Guru Nanak gave enlightenment to Sri Chand.

== Legacy ==
His successors continued the missionary work of Hasna's centre in western and southern Punjab, North-West Frontier Province, and Sindh. According to sources, two persons associated with Hasna's centre, Bhai Lal Das Daryai and Bhai Jado Rai, accompanied Guru Gobind Singh to the Deccan. Lal Das underwent the Pahul and was renamed Prahilad Singh, who authored a rehitnama (code of conduct). Udho Das, also associated with Hasna's centre, served Mata Panjab Kaur, the widow of Ram Rai at Dehradun after her death in April 1741, and succeeded her, constructing a samadhi honouring Bhai Balu Hasna at Dehradun. A shrine dedicated to Balu Hasna, known as Gurdwara Manhala Baba Balu Hasna, was also located in Manhala village in Lahore district but is no longer extant.

== See also ==
- Bhai Almast
- Udasi
- Sikhism
- Bhatra Sikhs
- Manhala
