= Bhai Almast =

Sikh preacher (1553-1643)

Personal life
- Born: Alu; 26 August 1553 Sri Nagar, Kashmir Sultanate (Present-day Jammu and Kashmir, India)
- Died: 1643 (aged 89–90)
- Parent(s): Pt. Hardatt (father); Mai Prabha (mother)

Religious life
- Religion: Sikhism
- Sect: Udasi

Religious career
- Based in: Nanakmatta
- Predecessor: Baba Gurditta
- Successor: Bhai Natha (in Dhaka)

Bhai Almast (26 August 1553 – 1643), also known as Alimata, Godaria, or Kambaliya, was a Sikh preacher, leader of a branch of the Udasi Sampradaya, and the elder brother of Bhai Balu Hasna, another prominent preacher of the Udasi sect. He was one of the four Adi-Udasis. His missionary centre was active in eastern India, such as a Puri, and in the Nanakmatta region of what is now Uttarakhand. He was also evangelizing later in his life in Sindh. He was active in the 17th century.

== Early life ==
Almast was born on 26 August 1553 in a Gaur Brahmin family of Srinagar (Kashmir) to Bhai Hardatt and Mai Prabha. He had a younger brother named Balu. His birth name was Alu, but due to his inclination towards mysticism and disinterest in the secular world, he became known as Almast, which means "in a state of ecstasy." He was also referred to as Kambalia or Godaria because of his basic attire consisting of a kambal (blanket) or godari (quilt).

In his youth, Alu departed from his home to pursue spirituality. In 1574, he arrived at Dera Baba Nanak, where he became a disciple of Sri Chand, the founder of the Udasi sect and the son of Guru Nanak. Almast served at the mausoleum of Guru Nanak (known as a dehurā) and looked after goats. He became known by the Almast moniker while living at Dera Baba Nanak. Baba Gurditta, the eldest son of Guru Hargobind, later appointed Bhai Almast to spread the message of Guru Nanak in the eastern regions of the Indian subcontinent.

== Career ==
In 1615, Bhai Almast established a shrine, known as Mangu Math in Puri (Odisha) to mark Guru Nanak's visit to the Jagannath temple. In 1633, he shifted to Nanakmatta, where Guru Nanak had a discourse with Nath yogis, discovering the former Sikh site had been confiscated by the yogis, who destroyed the Sikh shrine and burnt down the pipal tree that Nanak is said to have held his discussions with the yogis under. Bhai Almast asked help from Guru Hargobind, who restored the original Sikh shrine and is believed to have rejuvenated the pipal tree through miraculous means in June 1634.

=== Missionary work ===
==== Eastern India ====
After this incident, Bhai Almast spent the rest of his life in Nanak Mata and sent out eight principal disciples to preach in various districts of eastern India. These disciples established Sikh shrines in places visited by Guru Nanak during his first Udasi or preaching journey.

==== Sindh ====
Almast also traveled to Sindh, where he conducted missionary activities and successfully converted many Sindhis to the Udasipanth. His place of residence was at Rohri, at the dhuni established by Sri Chand. Those newly converted appended Ram or Das to the end of their names.

== Death ==
He died in 1643 and was succeeded by Bhai Natha, who carried-out missionary work in Bengal.

== See also ==
- Bhai Balu Hasna
- Udasi
- Sikhism
- Bhatra Sikhs
