= Baba Gurditta =

Son of Guru Hargobind, father of Guru Har Rai (1613–1638)

Baba Gurditta Ji
- ਬਾਬਾ ਗੁਰਦਿੱਤਾ
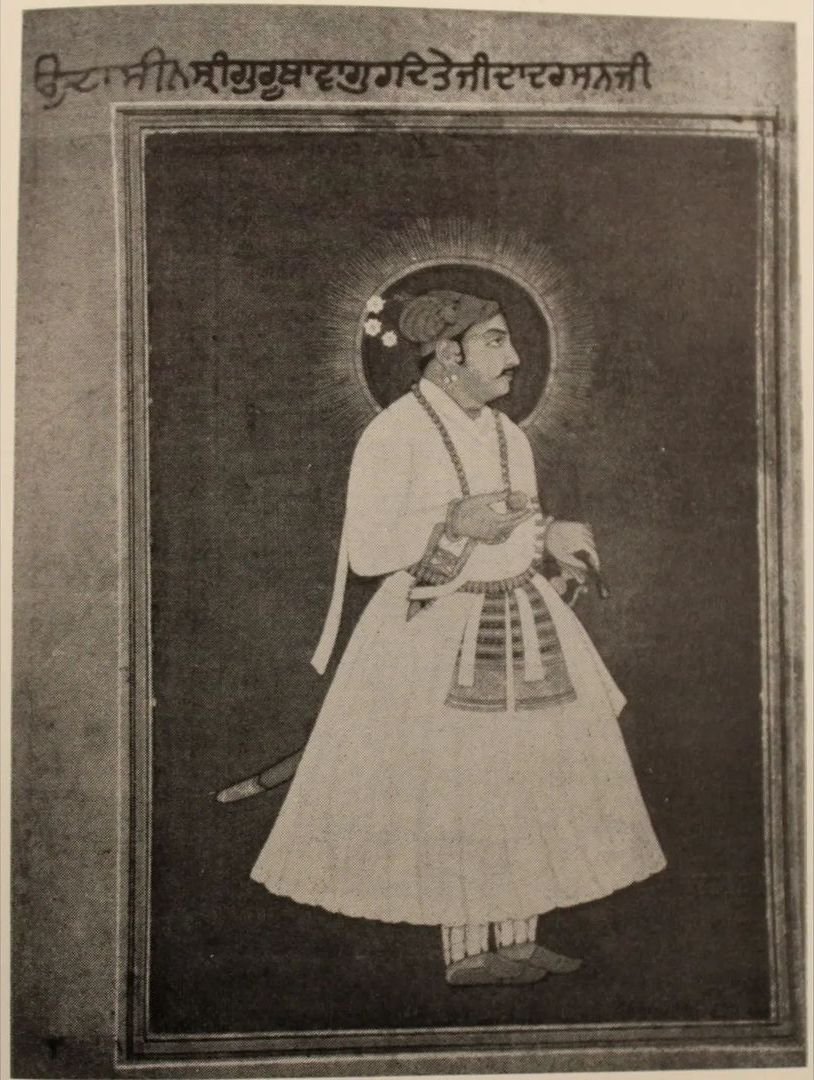
- Painting of Baba Gurditta held by the lineage of Ram Rai at Dehradun, ca.1685.

Head of Udasi Sect
- Preceded by: Sri Chand
- Succeeded by: Almast, Balu Hasne, Phul, and Goinde

Personal life
- Born: Gurditta Sodhi; 5 November 1613 Daroli Bhai, Firozpur, Punjab, India
- Died: 15 March 1638 (24-years-old) Outside Kiratpur, Punjab, India
- Cause of death: Seclusion
- Spouse: Ananti (alias: Natti), also known as Nihalo and Mata Bassi, later given the name of Nihal Kaur
- Children: Guru Har Rai; Dhir Mall (eldest)
- Parents: Guru Hargobind (father); Mata Damodari (mother)

Religious life
- Religion: Sikhism
- Sect: Udasi

Baba Gurditta (5 November 1613 – 15 March 1638, Gurmukhi: ਗੁਰਦਿੱਤਾ) was the son of Guru Hargobind (sixth Sikh guru), and the father of Guru Har Rai (seventh Sikh guru) of Sikhism. (Note: His name is alternatively spelt as 'Gurdita'.) There is a gurdwara in Kiratpur Sahib, Punjab which is in remembrance of Baba Gurditta.

== Early life ==
Baba Gurditta was born on the full moon of the month of Katak in 1613 to Mata Damodari and Guru Hargobind. According to Pashaura Singh, Gurditta was born on the full-moon day (pūrnamā) of the month of Assū in sambat 1665, which corresponds to 13 October 1608 C.E. Gurditta was born in the forests of Daroli located in the Malwa region of Punjab.

Guru Hargobind was organizing Sikh youth in Amritsar when he received the news of the birth of Gurditta, with this event being recorded as follows:

Good news (badhāī) came about Gurdita, son of Guru Hargobind Ji, the Sixth Master, grandson of Guru Arjan, ... who was born on the full moon day (pūrnamā) of Assū in sambat 1665 (13 October 1608 CE) from the womb of Mata Damodari. The birth took place at auspicious moment at Daroli in the forest country. Bhatt Bihārī was recognized at the event and the sacred food of the Guru (gurū kī karāhī) was distributed.

— Pashaura Singh (translator), The Routledge Companion to the Life and Legacy of Guru Hargobind: Sovereignty, Militancy, and Empowerment of the Sikh Panth (2024), page 100

He is said to have resembled Guru Nanak in his youth. According to Bhai Mani Singh Baba Gurditta got name from the fact that he looked like Guru Nanank (Gur) and from the fact that it seemed like Guru Nanak has given himself a physical form (ditta). Gurditta got engaged in 1619 in the month of Katak to Ananti known as Netti. He and his wife were both six years old at the time. They got married on 17 April 1621. A big wedding celebration occurred. Guru Hargobind gifts Gurditta a horse that is worth 100,000 rupees.

=== Birth year ===
Some sources record his birth year as being 1608 rather than 1613.

== Religious and military career ==
During the years 1626–1627, he lived in Kartarpur in the Jalandhar district as per directions by his father. He was the founder of Kiratpur near the Shivalik foothills, also according to commands by his father. He took part in the Battle of Kartarpur (1635) against Painde Khan. In the battle he killed a Mughal general named Asman Khan. Asman Khan and Gurditta were previously childhood friends. Gurditta shot Asman Khan with an arrow. Gurditta rushed by him and cried as Asman Khan died. When asked by his father, Guru Hargobind, why he is crying Gurditta remarked that he was just yesterday playing with Asman and now he is dead.

When a Sikh, named Nakhora, offered his daughter to be wed to Baba Gurditta, Mata Ananti protested against this idea and complained to Guru Hargobind. Afterwards, the Guru disapproved of the match and the daughter of Nakhora returned home unwed to Gurditta.

Baba Gurditta died around 1638, while his father was still alive. His brother Guru Tegh Bahadur would later become the ninth Sikh guru when Baba Gurdita's line of succession dried up. After the Battle of Kartarpur, he took rest under a Banyan tree which is still there in Kartarpur near Sukka Talab he tied his horses under the tree. The sacred Banyan tree has great significance for the Sikhs of Kartarpur. The site is maintained by the Toor clan.

Then Baba Gurditta followed the path 5 km north of Kartarpur and conducted the funeral of martyred Nihangs and where now stands a gurdwara called Killi Sahib.

=== Head of Udasi sect ===
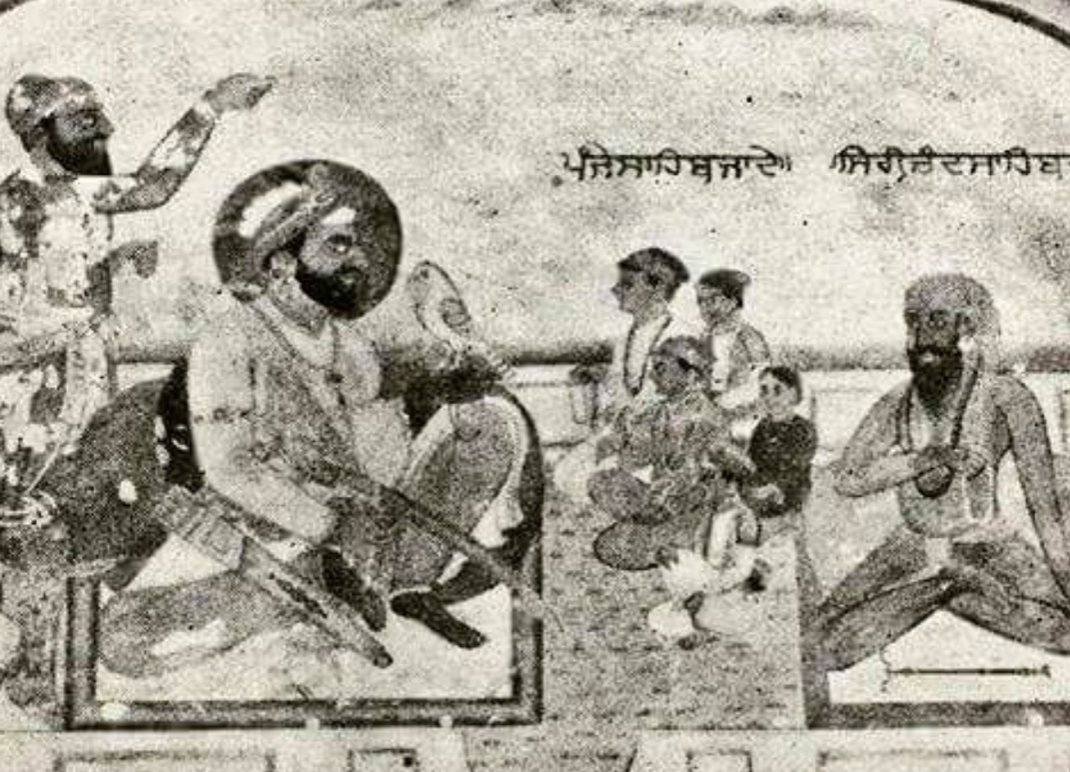
Mural painting of Guru Hargobind, his children (including Baba Gurditta at the top left in the group) and Sri Chand from the 19th century. It depicts the story of Sri Chand asking for Gurditta so he can become his apprentice

He was appointed by the aged Sri Chand to succeed him as the head of the Udasi sect that he had established. He is remembered for giving new strength and energy towards the missionary activities of the sect, such as by establishing four Udasi preaching centres known as dhūāṅs.

== Death ==
According to legend, on the earlier part of the day of 15 March 1638 in Kiratpur, Baba Gurditta performed a miracle reluctantly under duress where he revived a cow which he, or another member of his hunting party, had accidentally shot and killed after mistaking it for a deer while he was out hunting. The owners of the cow complained and demanded that Baba Gurditta resurrect the animal, which he did. Guru Hargobind later admonished him for performing a miracle. Baba Gurditta was deeply affected by this reprimand by his father and silently retired himself to a secluded place outside of Kiratpur, near the shrine of Budhan Shah, where he died later the same day. The Guru searched for him and discovered his dead body, which brought upon much sadness to Guru Hargobind and the Sikh congregation. These events may have had a strong impression on the young Tyag Mal (later Guru Tegh Bahadur), teaching him a lesson on the transience and impermanence of life. On the spot of his death now stands a dehrā (mausoleum). Another account of his death states that he died while wearing bride-groom robes after his requested marriage to the daughter of Nakhora was rejected by his father. He was succeeded as head of the Udasi sect by four of his disciples, them namely being Almast, Balu Hasne, Phul, and Goinde.

== Gurdwara Baba Gurditta ==
The Gurdwara Baba Gurditta monument located to the south of Kiratpur was erected in his memory, marking the location of his death and cremation. A sacred neem tree associated with Baba Gurditta can be found at this gurdwara. The neem tree supposedly sprouted from a neem twig that Baba Gurditta was holding when he died at the location. The gurudwara is situated at the entrance of the village and about 1.5 km from Garhshankar-Anandpur Sahib link highway. It is around two furlongs sought of Kiratpur and can be reached by climbing 132 steps. It was built in memory of Baba Gurditta and Baba Kesra Singh Ji. The site marks the death location of Baba Gurditta.

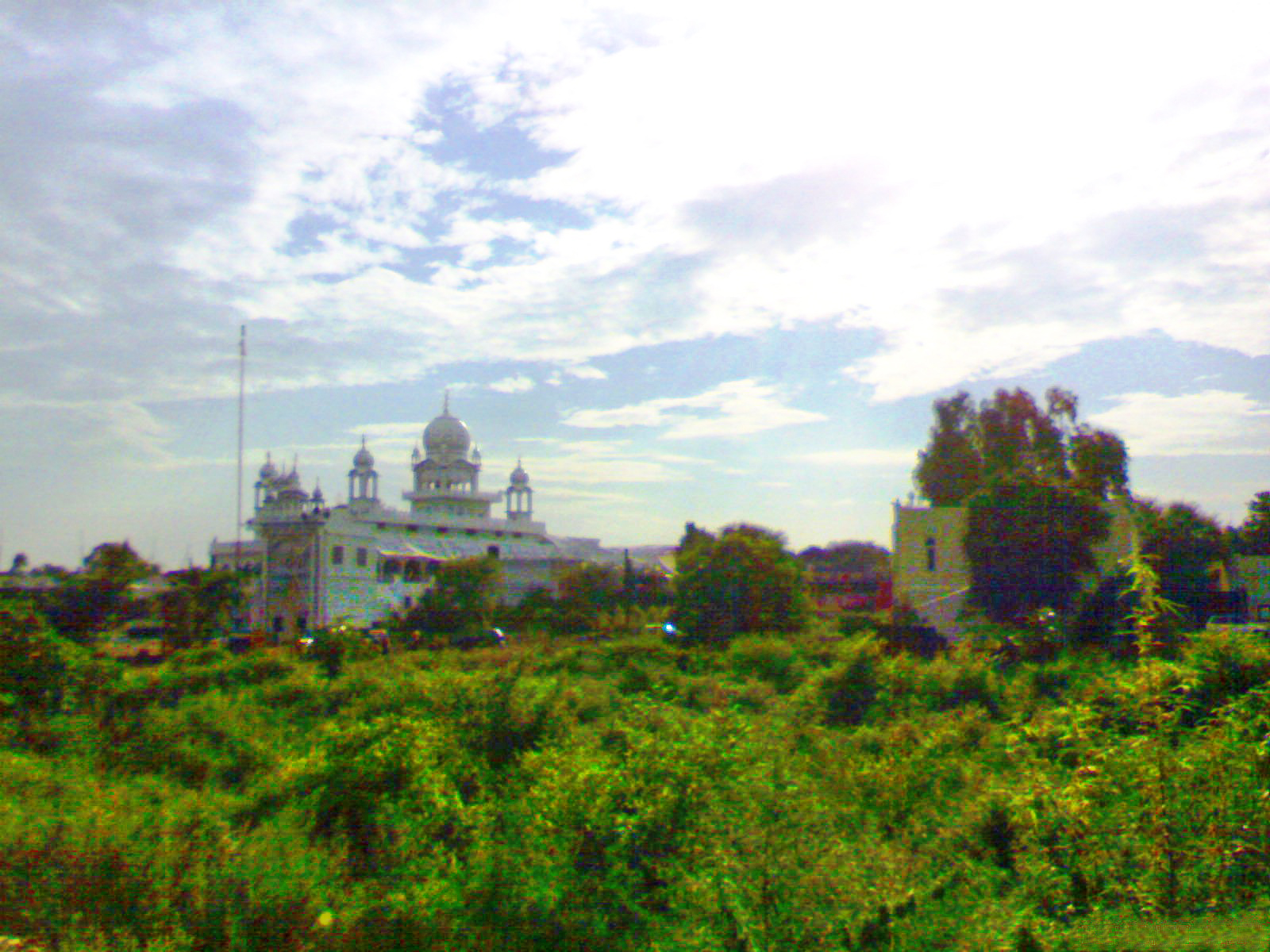
Gurudwara Baba Gurditta Ji

The site marks the location where Baba Gurditta is said to have died after being rebuked by his father for resurrecting a cow he had accidentally killed while hunting. The sixth Sikh guru is said to have cremated Gurditta's remains at the location. A sacred neem tree is said to be present at the site which supposedly sprouted from a neem twig that Baba Gurditta was holding when he died.

It is a popular place for pilgrimage, being renowned for its karah parshad.

== Gallery ==
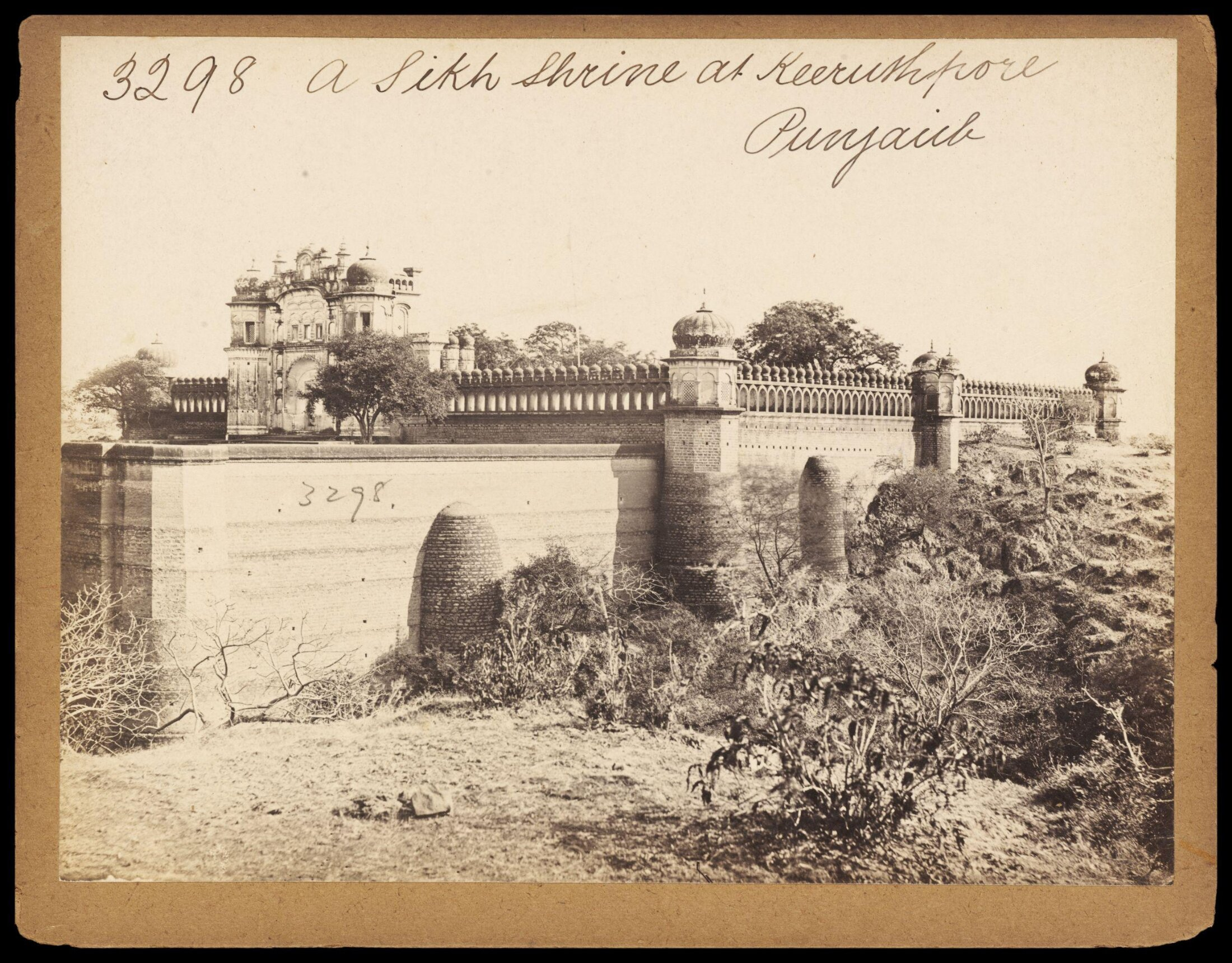
Gurdwara Baba Gurditta at Kiratpur in the 19th century

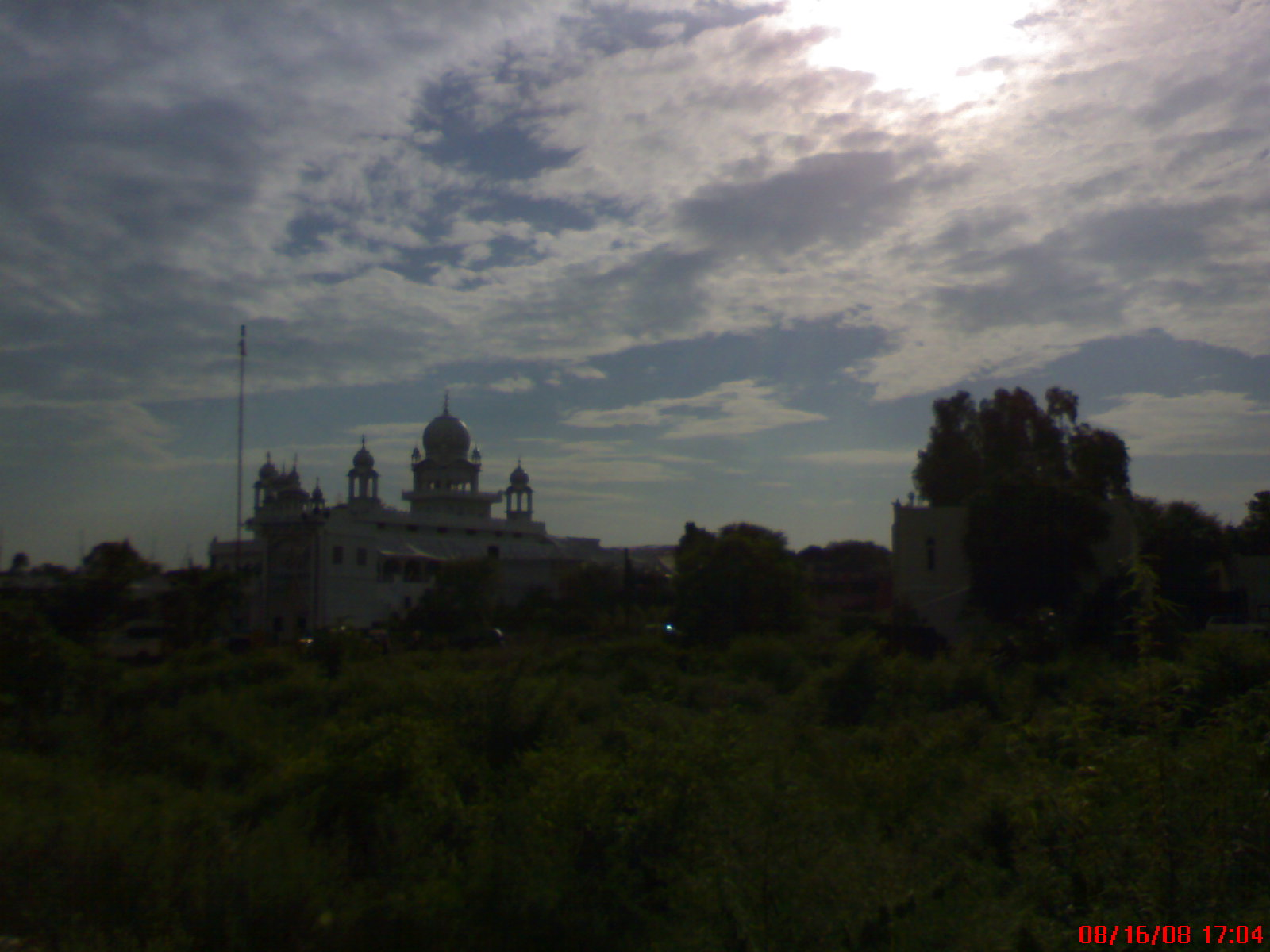
Present-day Gurdwara Baba Gurditta

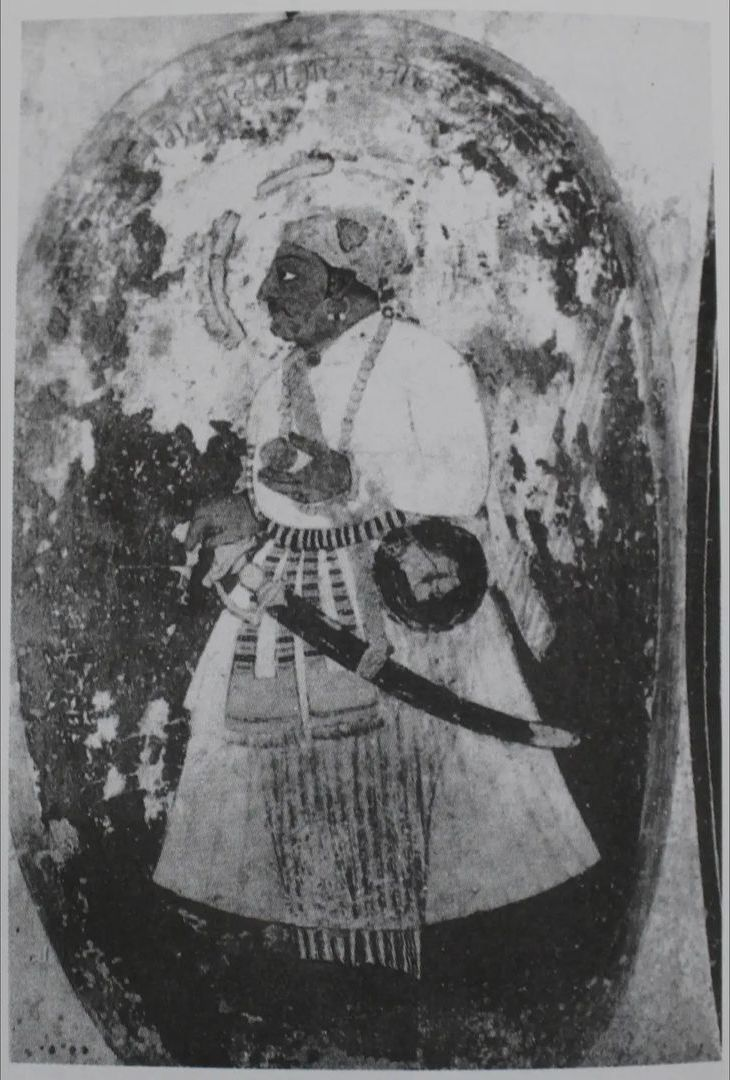
Early 18th century fresco art depicting Baba Gurditta from Dehradun

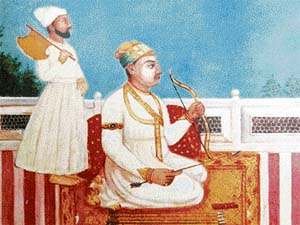
Painting of Baba Gurditta Sodhi seated with an attendant, circa late 19th century

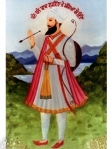
20th century depiction of Gurditta

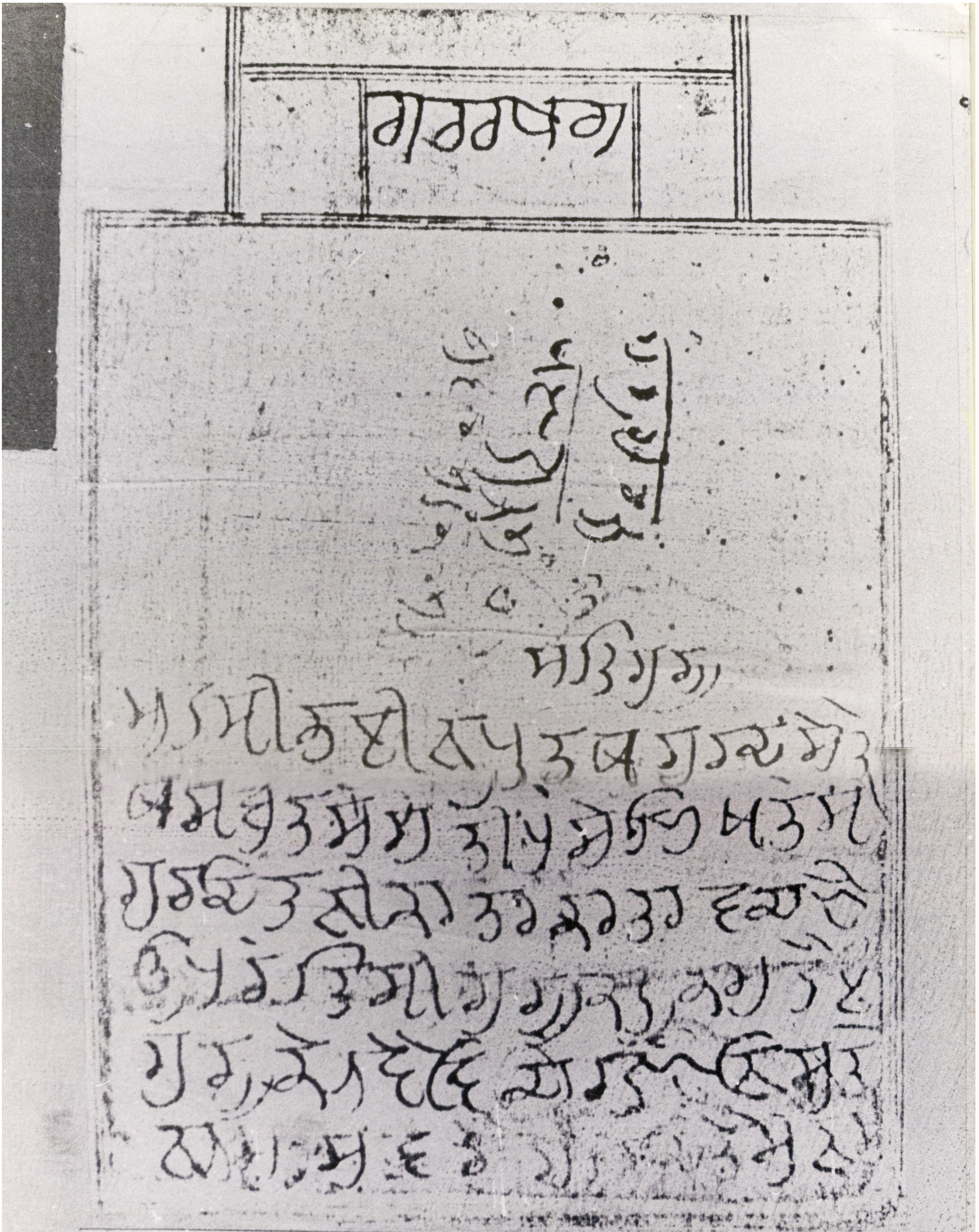
Hukamnama issued by Baba Gurditta, circa 17th century
