= Bangla Bazar =

Neighbourhood of Dhaka, Bangladesh

Coordinates: 22°36′N 91°39′E

Bangla Bazar (Bengali: বাংলা বাজার) is the oldest neighbourhood of Dhaka, which existed before Mughal Period. Currently, the largest publication and book market of Dhaka is located in the area.

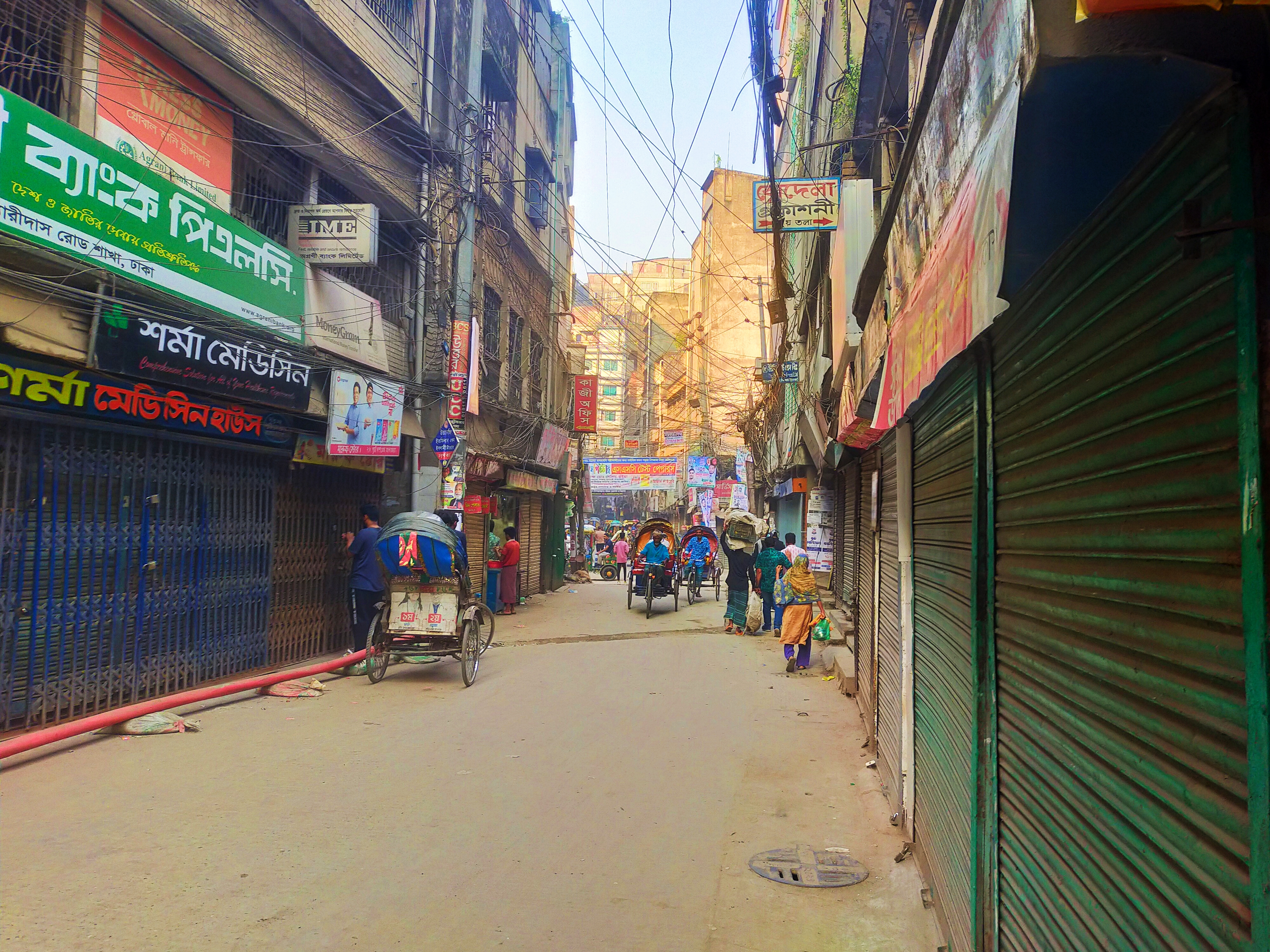
A portion of Paridas Road at Bangla Bazar

== History ==
Some historians think that Bangla Bazar was the center of the 'Bangala' city mentioned by many travelers. Some others think that Bangla Bazar was established in Sultani period when the word 'Bangala' became popular. A Roman citizen wrote in 1506 AD that the finest silk and yarn in the world was produced in Bengal. Through this, we get an idea about the antiquity of Banglabazar, the center of Bengal.
