= Lakhmi Das =

Guru Nanak's younger son (1497–1555)

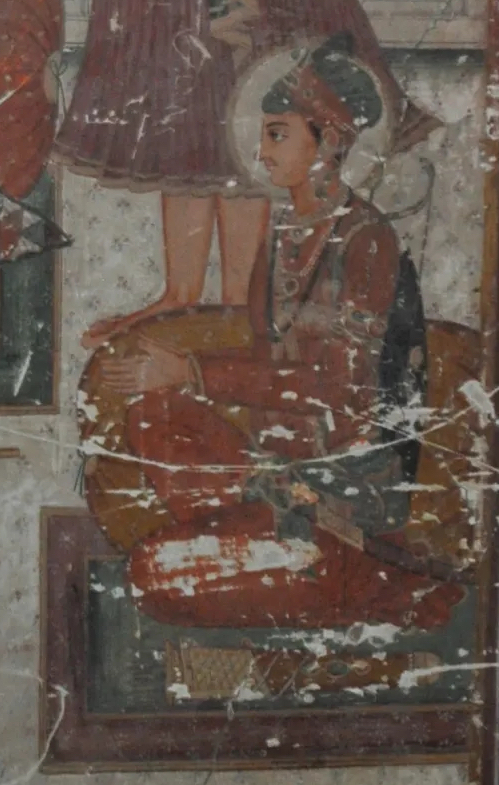
- Detail of Lakhmi Das from a mural located in the haveli of Khem Singh Bedi located in Kallar Syedan, Rawalpindi district, Punjab, circa 1850–1890

Personal life
- Born: 12 February 1497 Sultanpur Lodhi, Delhi Sultanate
- Died: 9 April 1555 (aged 58) Kartarpur (on Ravi), Suri Empire
- Spouse: Dhanvanti
- Children: Dharam Das (son)
- Parent(s): Guru Nanak (father); Mata Sulakhni (mother)
- Relatives: Sri Chand (elder brother)

Religious life
- Religion: Sikhism
- Sect: Jagiasi

Lakhmi Das (12 February 1497 – 9 April 1555 (Note: Some sources give his birth year as 1496.)), also known as Lakhmi Chand, was the younger son of Guru Nanak and Mata Sulakhni and founder of the Jagiasi sect of Sikhism.

== Biography ==
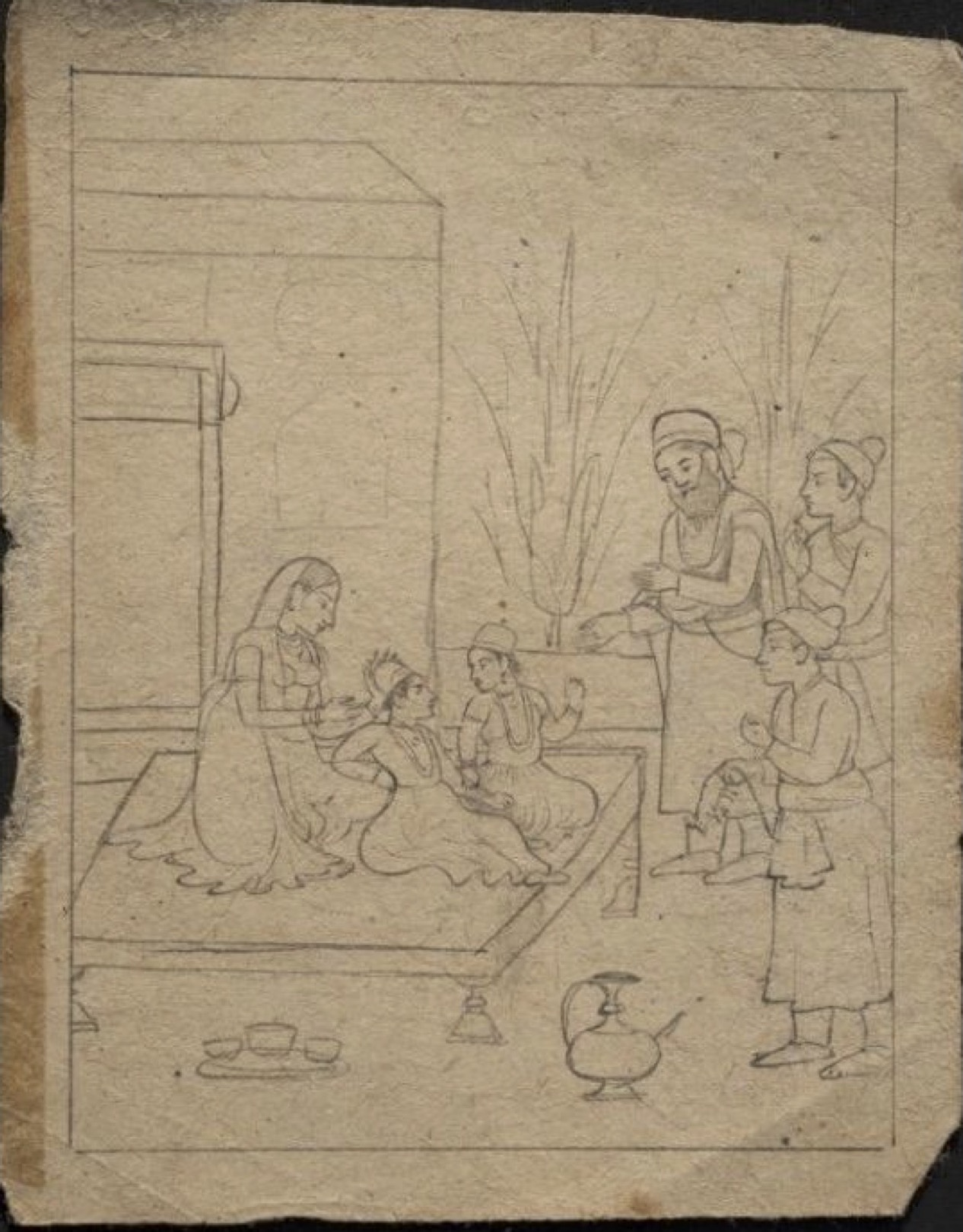
Guru Nanak with his sons, Sri Chand and Lakhmi Das. Sikh-Guler. Middle or last quarter of 18th century

He was born to Guru Nanak and Mata Sulakhni in Sultanpur Lodhi on 12 February 1497. He differed in his life path from his elder brother, Sri Chand, as the latter became an ascetic recluse whilst Lakhmi Das married and had children, living the life of a householder. He married a woman named Dhanvanti and settled in Dera Baba Nanak. Lakhmi Das worked the land as a farmer. Lakhmi Das was also fond of hunting and was an avid huntsman. His wife eventually bore him a son in 1515, named Dharam Das (also spelt as Dharam Chand).

=== Guruship candidacy ===
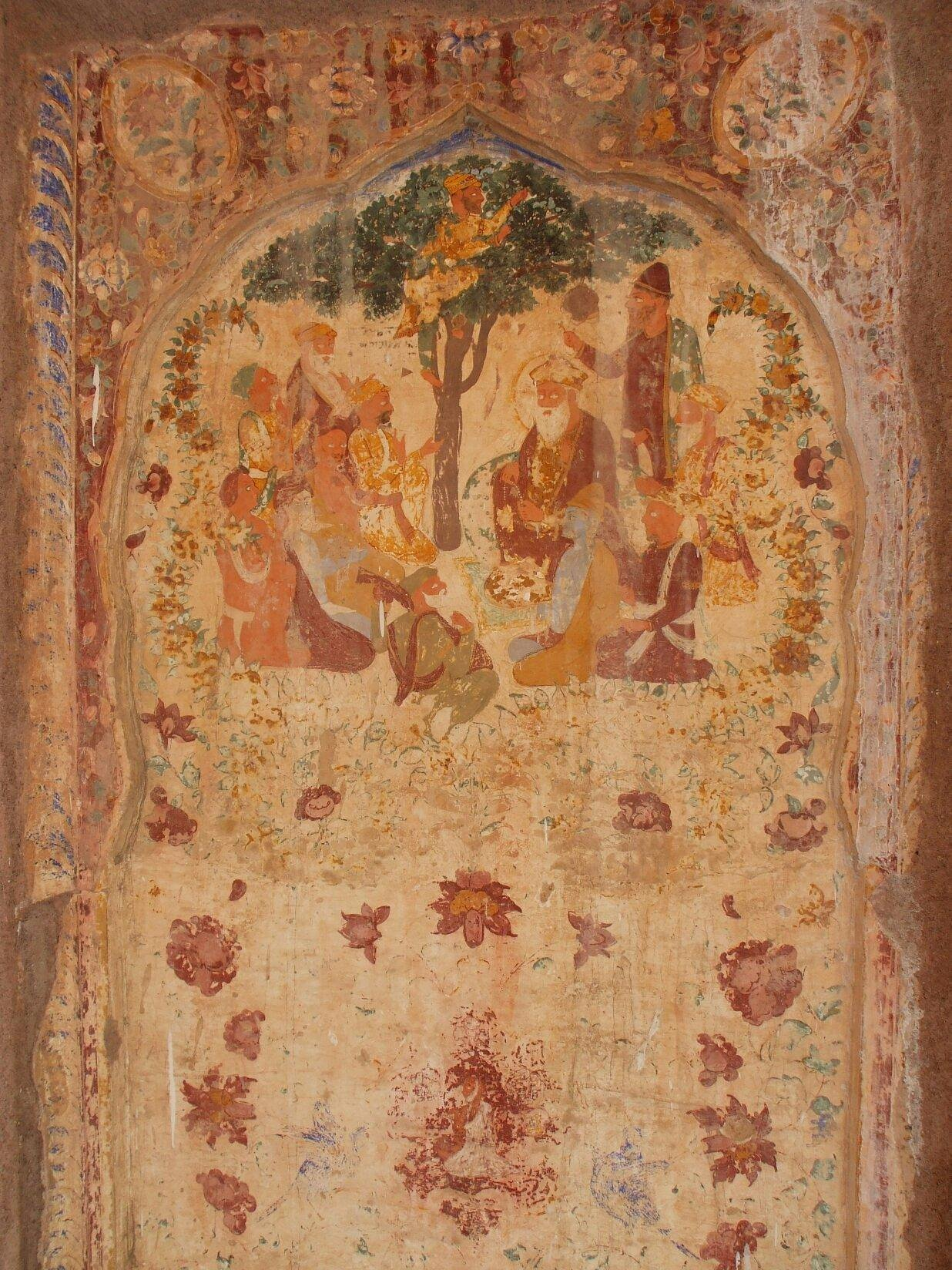
Mural from Gurdwara Baba Atal depicting the story of Guru Nanak testing his potential successors by asking them to climb a tree to obtain food for guests. Lakhmi Das and Sri Chand refused to do so (both are depicted below Nanak) whilst Bhai Lehna obeyed (depicted climbing the tree to obtain sustenance for the gathering below).

According to Harish Dhillon, Guru Nanak may have passed over Lakhmi Das when deciding who will be his successor because he was too absorbed in materialism. A sakhi tells of a time when Guru Nanak requested his two sons to climb a kikar tree to obtain fruit to feed guests but Lakhmi Das and his brother refused to obey his solicitation while Bhai Lehna gladly obeyed and obtained bountiful amounts of fruit, showcasing his devoutness and loyalty to the Guru. Another sakhi tells of a time when Guru Nanak asked his two sons to carry a bundle of sticks but they refused to whilst Bhai Lehna humbly obliged this command. Another anecdote of a test performed by Nanak occurred when he asked Lakhmi Das and his elder brother to pick up a jug that fell into dirty ditch and bring it to him. Lakhmi Das refused to as he saw this task as beneath him, he thought very highly of himself since he was the son of Guru Nanak. Meanwhile, Bhai Lehna obeyed without hesitation and completed the task by bring the Guru fresh, clean water in the jug that he obtained from the ditch. When his father died, him and his elder brother initially rejected the reality of the guruship being passed onto Bhai Lehna, who became Guru Angad. They may have wanted to make a claim for the guruship themselves but according to Sikh legend, when they requested Guru Angad give them their father's cloak (a symbol of the guruship), neither Lakhmi Das nor his son, Dharam Das, could lift it. This satisfied their hearts that Guru Angad was the rightful successor to their father and quelled their desires for the seat of leadership.

=== Spiritual career ===
Lakhmi Das was the purported founder of the Jagiasi sect of Sikhism (also known as Jagiasu or Jijnasu; from the Sanskrit word jijñāsā meaning "desire to know"). It was a sister-sect to the Udasis and bore many similarities to it, with the critical difference being that the Udasis follow a lifestyle of celibacy, reclusiveness, and asceticism, following in the footsteps of Lakhmi's elder brother, Sri Chand, the Jagiasu sect which Lakhmi had founded on the other hand promoted and lived the life of a householder, known as grist marg.

There exists a belief that Lakhmi Chand may have been the scribe of the Guru Harsahai Pothi. Balwant Singh Dhillon finds the connection unlikely.

=== Death ===
Lakhmi Das died on 9 April 1555 at the age of 58 in Kartarpur (Sur Empire) near the Ravi River.

== Legacy ==
His son, Dharam Das, wedded a woman from the Passi Khatri clan in 1527, who was the daughter of Diwan Uttam Das and Bibi Lajwanti. Dharam Das had two sons named Manak Das and Mehr Das. The Bedi descendants of Guru Nanak, such as Sahib Singh Bedi and Khem Singh Bedi, trace their lineage ultimately from him.
