= Jijnasa =

Jijñāsā is the 'desire to know' in Hinduism. When the jijñāsā or the desire to know the true nature of objects intensifies then one reaches the threshold of jñāna or knowledge about those objects; knowledge. The desire to know is called the sādhya-sādhanā, the desire to know is the very base of knowledge which is an excited state that leads to understanding (paroksha jñāna) which is the beginning point of deeper knowledge (aproksha jñāna).

== Meaning ==
Jijñāsā (Sanskrit: जिज्ञासा) generally means – 'the desire of knowing', 'curiosity', 'inquisitiveness' or 'deliberation (on the nature of)', 'search', 'investigation', 'test' or 'examination'. The word, jijñāsā, is a grammatical form called nominal desiderative; it is derived from the verbal stem "to know" to mean "the desire to know" rather than "inquiry".

== Advaita Vedanta’s interpretation ==
Shankara, in the context of the desire to know Brahman, does not equate Jijñāsā or the desire to know, with inquiry, simply because the act of inquiry requires as its prior motivation the desire to know and which desire does not depend upon the desire to know how to perform rituals. It is his opinion that the uncaused pure desire to know must be accompanied by the motivation for the comparative study of the scriptures. In this context Radhakrishnan states:

Ascent to higher levels of living, losing oneself to find the higher self can be achieved through jijnasa or disinterested passion for knowledge. It lifts man out of his narrow limits and makes him forget his self in the contemplation of the universal principles of existence. Knowledge pursued for the sake of power or fame does not take us far. It must be sought for attaining the truth.

Shankara holds the view that it is logical for a man who has studied the Upanishads to undertake a deliberation on Brahman even without deliberation on the religious rites. According to him deliberations, on virtuous deeds and Brahman, differ as regards results and objects of inquiry because virtuous deeds are related to things yet to be accomplished whereas Brahman is a pre-existing entity. Swami Gambhirananda explains that the phrase - Brahma-jijñāsā, literally means - 'a wish to know Brahman'; and a wish invariably proceeds spontaneously from the knowledge that something is achievable by effort and that when achieved would lead to desirable results. In the sutra – अथातो ब्रह्मजिज्ञासा, this phrase means - 'a deliberation on the nature of Brahman'. In his commentary on this sutra, Shankara has extended the intended knowledge of Brahman far beyond the limits of informative knowledge and has indicated direct realisation of identity as its goal. The word अथः means – 'thereafter' or 'hereafter', and the end result of this inquiry is knowledge of Brahman.

== Significance ==
Jijñāsā as a philosophical investigation removes the obstacles to aproksha jñāna which are – a) 'ignorance of the subject' and b) 'doubts and misconceptions regarding the truth and the import of the scriptures'. The knowledge of Brahman has its culmination in anubhava ('direct experience/realisation'), and in the matter of Brhama-jijñāsā, śruti alone is not the pramāna ('instrument of knowledge'), both, śruti and anubhava combined are the pramāna. Vidyaranya in his Panchadasi (Sloka VII.67) reminds us:

पारोक्षेण विबुध्येन्द्रो य आत्मेत्यादिलक्षणात् |
अप्रोक्षीकर्तुमिच्छंश्चतुर्वारं गुरुं ययौ ||

Indra acquired indirect knowledge of Brahman by studying Its attributes; he then went to his teacher four times with a view to gaining direct knowledge of the self.

which statement emphasizes acquisition of indirect knowledge and the direct knowledge to realize that the individual self is the same as the universal self.

== Dharma-jijñāsā ==
In the matter of Dharma-jijñāsā the emphasis is on knowing or becoming familiar with the rituals thus converting that process into an act of inquiry. Vācaspati Miśra makes a distinction between jijñāsā as the instigating desire to know and mīmāṃsā as the activity of inquiry equivalent to jijñāsā as inquiry (vicāra) commanding respect. Ramanuja upholds the view that jnana i.e. 'knowledge', should be action-oriented to produce results, mere knowledge provided by testimony does not result in liberation. He relies on Badarayana’s sutra III.iv.26 which reads as follows:

सर्वापेक्षा च यज्ञादिश्रुतेरश्ववत्

On the strength of the Upanishadic sanction of sacrifices etc., all religious activities as well are necessary. This is the same as in the case of a horse in matters of its adequacy.

and approves selective use of religious rituals.
