= Sri Chand =

Guru Nanak's elder son (1494–1629)

Baba Sri Chand Ji
- ਸ੍ਰੀ ਚੰਦ
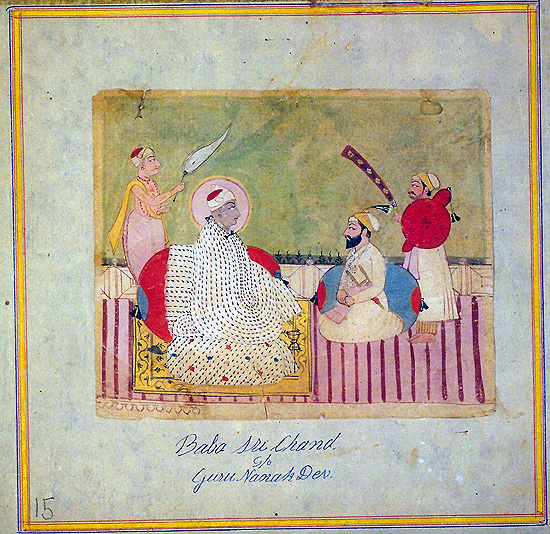
- Painting of Sri Chand, elder son of Guru Nanak and founder of the Udasi sect, with a visitor and fly-whisk attendants, circa early-19th century.

Head of Udasi sect
- Preceded by: Position established (founder)
- Succeeded by: Baba Gurditta

Personal life
- Born: Sri Chand Bedi; 8 September 1494 Sultanpur Lodhi, Delhi Sultanate
- Died: 13 January 1629 (134 years old) Kiratpur, Lahore Subah, Mughal Empire
- Parents: Guru Nanak (father); Mata Sulakhni (mother)
- Relatives: Lakhmi Das (brother)

Religious life
- Religion: Udasi

Sri Chand (8 September 1494 – 13 January 1629; Gurmukhi: ਸ੍ਰੀ ਚੰਦ), also referred to as Baba Sri Chandra or Bhagwan Sri Chandra, was the founder of the Udasi sect of ascetic Sadhus. Sri Chand was the son of Guru Nanak, founder of the Sikh religion. However, despite being Guru Nanak's son, he was passed over when it came to choosing a successor, with the mantle of Sikh guruship being bestowed upon a close follower of his father instead.

Sri Chand would forge his own religious career and followed in his father's foot-steps by also embarking on travels, with him becoming an ascetic and leader of his own sect. He maintained relations with the successive Sikh gurus throughout his long life. Sri Chand would choose the son of a Sikh guru as his own successor. Sikh sources give his life the impressive dates of 8 September 1494 – 13 January 1629, which would have made him 134 years old upon his death but current scholarship attributes errors in the dates of his birth and death to conversion to different calendars and mistakes.

== Names ==
Amongst the Udasin Panchayati Bada Akhara, he is known as Guru Chandradev while Udasin Panchayati Naya Akhara refer to him as Guru Chandracharya. He is also known as Sri Candracarya.

== Early life ==
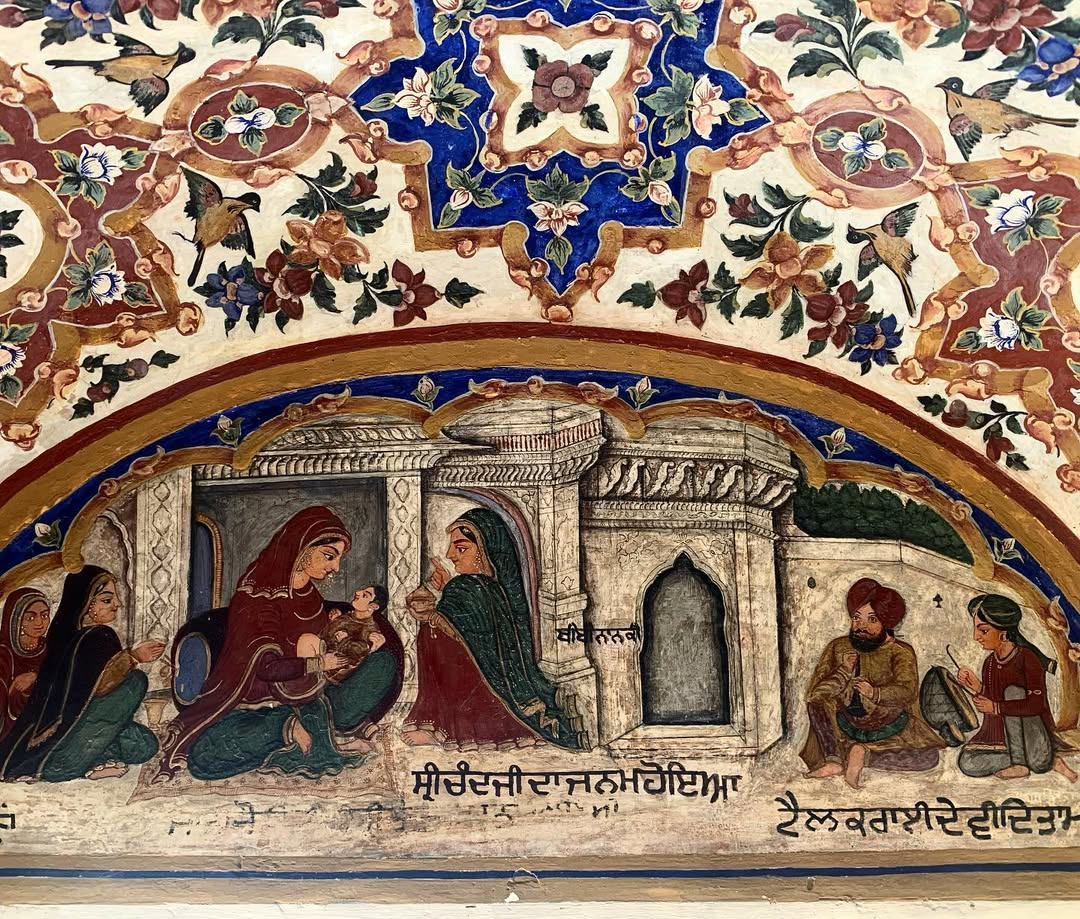
Mural depicting the birth of Sri Chand, eldest son of Guru Nanak, and the founder of the Udasi sect, made with the donation from Lala Devi Ditta Mal, from Gurdwara Baba Atal Rai, Amritsar, ca.1890's

Sri Chand was the eldest son of Guru Nanak, the first Guru and founder of Sikhism. He was born to Mata Sulakhani on Bhadra sudi 9, 1551 Bikrami (i.e. 8 September 1494) in Sultanpur Lodhi. Other versions of his birth-story place his birth in Talwandi. (Note: The full Bikrami date of his birth is Bhadrapada Sukla Navamī, vikramī 1551.) According to lore, Sri Chand was born with ash covering his body, hair that was matted, three horizontal forehead marks, and rings in his right ear. The horoscope of Sri Chand is said to have been auspicious, predicting his future learning and celibacy.

Guru Nanak, Sri Chand's father, first went on one of his travel-tours, known as an udāsī, when Sri Chand was seven-years-old. Whilst Guru Nanak was out on his long travels, Sri Chand's mother, Mata Sulakhani, took him and his younger brother, Lakhmi Das, to her parental house located in the village of Pakkhoke Randhawa (located in present-day Dera Baba Nanak). Sri Chand when he was around nine-years-old underwent the yajnopavīta ceremony, being invested with the sacred-thread. He also began studying Vedic literature under Pandit Hardayal.

As Sri Chand matured, he became a spiritually-inclined individual who grew to be indifferent to worldly affairs, being aligned with asceticism and celibacy. Sri Chand decided to start spiritually training himself to become a worthy successor of his father. When he was eleven years old, he left for Srinagar in Kashmir to study Sanskrit literature and scriptures at the gurukula of Pandit Purushottam Kaul (Acarya Puruṣottama Kaul). He also studied and partook in yoga under the mentorship of Avinasha Muni (Avinasi Munī). Whilst in Srinagar, Sri Chand had a religious debate with the Sanskrit scholar Somanatha Tripathi, defeating him in the debate, thus winning him acclaim.

After he reached adulthood, Sri Chand had become an ascetic and followed a life calling of celibate reclusivity. Guru Nanak finally returned home for good in 1522 after his last travel tour and thus Sri Chand returned to living with his family.

== Candidacy for Sikh guruship ==
Sri Chand had promoted renunciation and celibacy, which were against the teachings of Sikhism. Guru Nanak decided to elect Bhai Lehna (who became Guru Angad) to be his successor, much to the dismay of Sri Chand, who had been preparing himself to be worthy of being the successor. Bhai Lehna had been a comparatively much more recent follower of his follower compared to Sri Chand yet was selected as the successor. Instead of the guruship, Sri Chand was given joint-custody over the estate of his father at Kartarpur alongside his younger brother Lakhmi Das. However, Sri Chand became disinterested in managing this estate and left it all for his brother to manage, instead preferring to embark on a spiritual career.

According to Bhai Gurdas' Varan, Sri Chand was egotistic, which is why his father passed over him as a suitable successor:

Sri Chand, a celibate since childhood, made a centre [attributed to] Baba Nanak.

Dharam Chand, son of Lakhmi Das, made a show of himself.

Dasu installed [himself] on the seat of authority and Datu learned to sit in the siddh posture.

Mohan went mad, and Mohari was celebrated.

Prithi Chand, the rascal, with his hidden agenda, spread madness.

Mahadev was egotistical and was led astray.

Living amid the sandalwood, yet without its fragrance.

— Bhai Gurdas, Varan, Pannaa 26, section 33

== Spiritual career ==
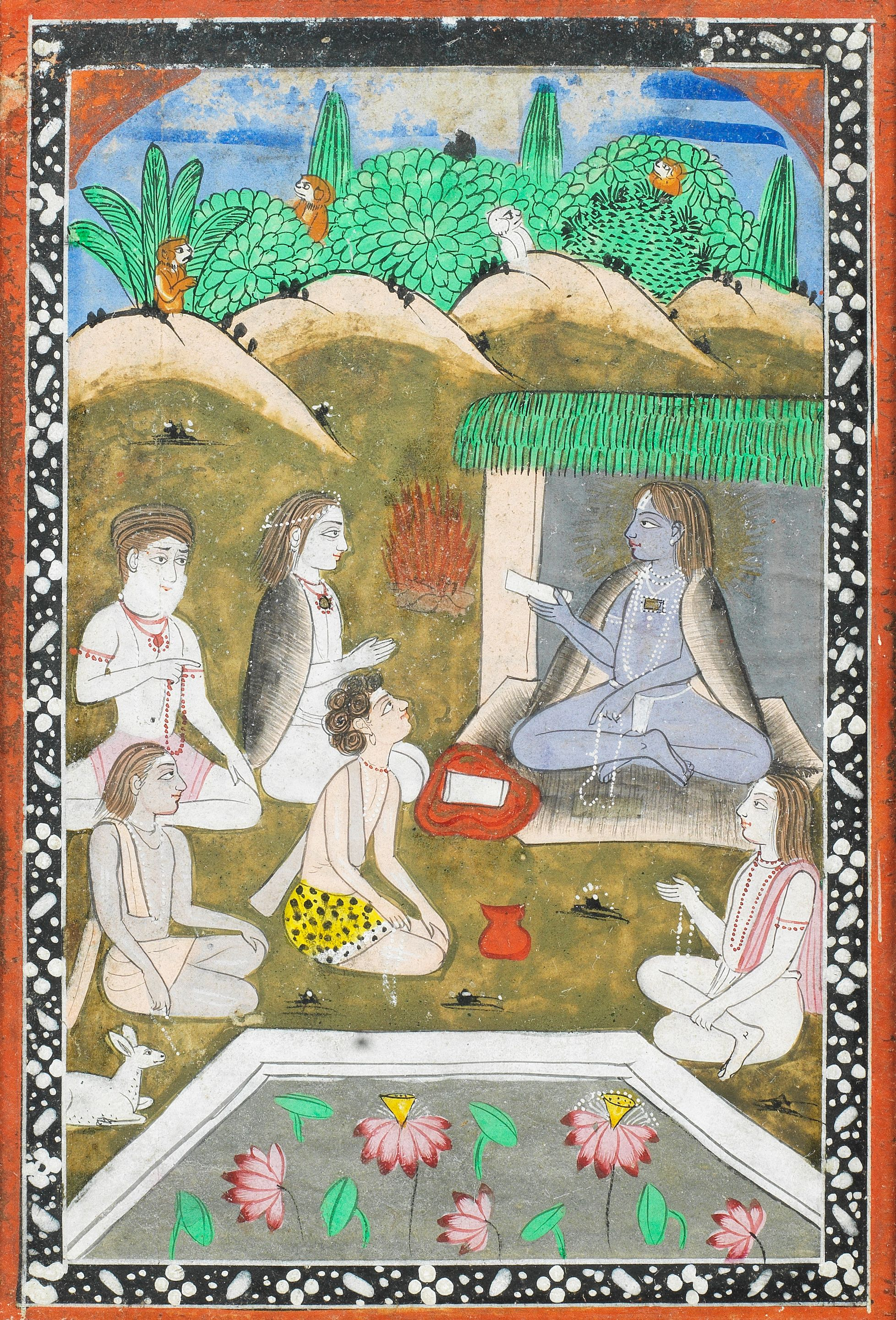
Sri Chand, son of Guru Nanak, seated reading scriptures to devotees in a forest hermitage. Pahari School, ca.1850-70.

In 1539, after the death of his father and not being selected for the guruship, Sri Chand became disinterested in the secular world, started wearing only a loin-cloth, and spent much of his time meditating at the samadh dedicated to his father at Kartarpur that he had built over the location where part of his father's remains were burnt. Due to his lack of proper attire, a childhood friend of Sri Chand had to burn cow-dung in-order to keep Sri Chand warm while he was engrossed in meditation in winter. The dhuni would later become an important aspect of Udasi theology and symbolism.

It is said that after his father's death on 7 September 1539, Muslim followers of Nanak constructed a shrine at the spot his ashes had been buried. During a flooding event of the Ravi River, this shrine was apparently washed away by the flood water. Sri Chand managed to rediscover the urn containing his father's ashes that had been upheaved by the flood and he therefore shifted the urn to Pakkhoke Randhawa for it to be reburied near the well of Ajita Randhawa, an early follower of Nanak. The present-day shrine of Dera Baba Nanak evolved ultimately as a dera out of the samadh (mausoleum) constructed at that location by Sri Chand, who re-buried the remains of his father at the site that developed into the settlement. In 1548, Sri Chand shifted to Bath village near Pathankot.

Sri Chand had a high-regard for his father despite any incompatibilities of their spiritual views and teachings. According to the Udasis, specifically the Mātrā attributed to Balu Hasna, Guru Nanak gave enlightenment to Sri Chand. Sri Chand founded the Udasi sect to propagate the philosophy of his father, Nanak, or at-least a version of it he had interpreted. As the founder and leader of the Udasi sect, he established their main base of operations at Barath (located eight kilometres southwest of Pathankot). Sri Chand embarked on many travels throughout the Indian subcontinent with his entourage of followers, much like his own father did before him. The tradition claims he travelled to places such as Sindh, Baluchistan, Kabul, Kandahar, Peshawar, Kailash and Mānasarovar in Tibet, Nepal, Bhutan, Kāmarupa in Assam, Puri, Somnath, Ramesvaram, Kanyakumari, and Sinhal Dvipa (Sri Lanka).

Sri Chand is believed to have spent much of his time in meditation in the wilderness despite the dangers. Many miraculous events are tied to him in the traditional lore. One example of such a miracle-tale took place at Śankheśvara in Dvarika bet, Gujarat, where it is claimed he blew his conch, then buried it, which made a spring form. A story connected to Chamba claims Sri Chand could make large boulders float in the river to carry him across a local river after a boatman refused to help him cross. Yet another tale takes place in Kashmir, where Sri Chand is believed to have produced green leaves on a burning piece of wood in the presence of officials of Yakub Khan, who were planning to arrest him. The location this feat took place is now marked by Śrī Candra Cināra, managed by the Śrī Candra Cināra Baḍā Akhārā Udāsīna Trust.

=== Composing Aarta ===
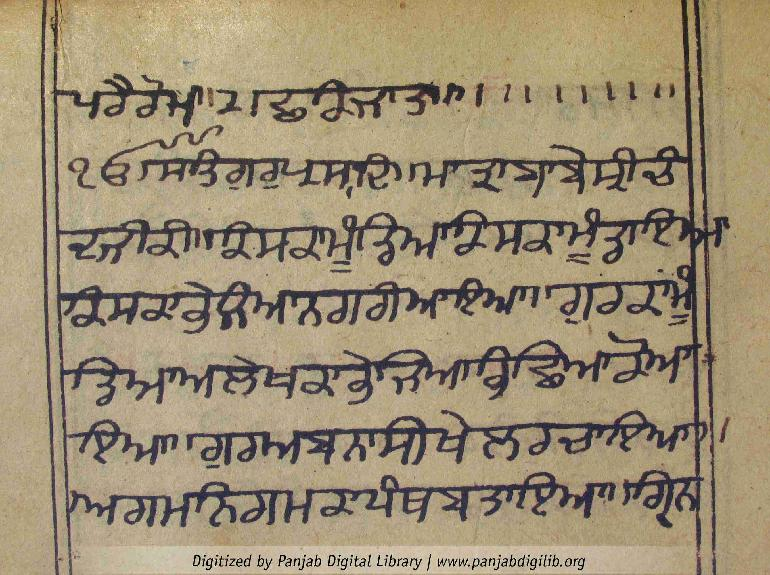
Folio of a manuscript of Matra Sahib, attributed to Sri Chand

Sri Chand wrote a ten verse work titled Arta Sri Guru Nanak Dev, popularly known simply as Aarta, in praise of his father, Guru Nanak, and presented it to him after one of the Udasis (travels). This writing had a major influence on people of that time who did not know about Guru Nanak yet.

He proclaims Guru Nanak as the Supreme Lord of the Universe. He envisions the Sun and the Moon, all elements of Nature, Crores [tens of millions] of gods and the whole creation engaged in singing the Glory of their Lord. Guru Nanak.

— translation of Sri Chand's Aarta by Partap Singh Jaspal, Eternal Glory of Guru Nanak (2019), pages 32–33 (Note: The original wording is as follows: Aarta Kijey Nanak Shah Patshah Ka Har Har Deen Dunia Ke Shehan Shah Ka Char Kunt Jaki Dharamshala Sangat Gawey Shabad Rasala Aarta Kijey ... Kot Devi Jaki Jot Jagaway Kot Tetees Jaki Ustat Gawey Aarta Kijey ... Chhinwey Kror Jakey Charan Pakhaley Chand Surai Jaki Jot Ujaley Aarta Kijey ... Bhaar Athharah Jaki Pohap Ki Mala Param Jot Satgur Deen Dyala Aarta Kijey ... Pawan Rai Jako Chawar Jhulawey Rikhi Muni Jako Dhian Legawey Aarta Kijey ... Panj Parwan Hai Satgur pura Bajey Shabad Anahad Toora Aarta Kijey ... Ghanta Bajey Dhun Onkara Adhar Akhand Jako Jhilmil Tara Aarta Kijey ... Srichand Bakhaney Satgur Nanak Poota Agam, Agad, Adol, Awdhuta Aarta Kijey ... Jo Jan Nanak Shah Ka Aarta Gawey Basey Baikunth Param Gat Pawey Aarta Kijey ... Saran Parey Ki Rakh Dyala Nanak Tumrey Bal Gopala Aarta Kijey ...)

=== Possible contribution to the Adi Granth ===
According to a sakhi, when Guru Arjan had finished composing sixteen astpadis (cantos) of the Gauri Sukhmani composition, popularly known as Sukhmani Sahib, Sri Chand visited him. During this visit, it is said that Guru Arjan requested him to continue the composition he was compiling and complete the seventeenth canto of the Sukhmani Sahib. Sri Chand humbly recited the verse of his father following the Mul Mantar in the Japji Sahib. Thus, it became the seventeenth canto of the Sukhmani Sahib.

== Relationship with Sikhs ==
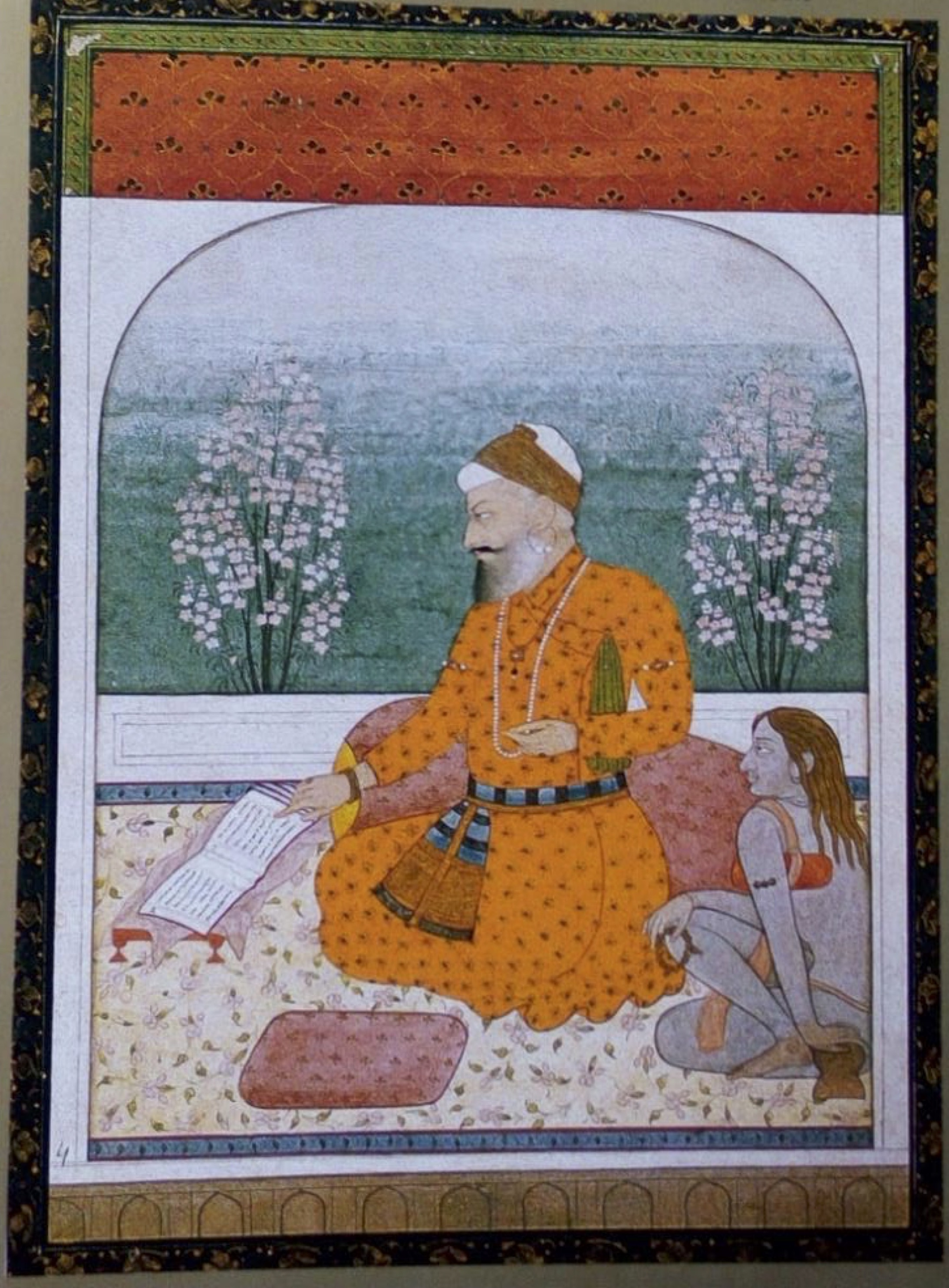
Painting of Guru Arjan, Lahore Museum, ca.1800. A figure, possibly Sri Chand, can be seen sitting beside him.

It is believed that Sri Chand rejected Guru Angad as the successor to his father. When the Sikh guruship passed from Nanak to Angad, the sons of Nanak, Sri Chand and Lakhmi Das, made a legal claim to their father's properties in Kartarpur, forcing Guru Angad to reestablish the early Sikh community's centre at his native village of Khadur instead. In Guru Angad's compositions, he discusses subtly how he was the true successor who earned it, rebuking any potential claims to the guruship by Nanak's sons. Guru Angad, Guru Amardas, and Guru Ram Das warned the Sikhs from adopting the ascetic practices of the Udasis, instead they advocated that it was superior to be like an Udasi whilst still living an ordinary-life, not a celibate or ascetic one. Baba Mohan, son of Amar Das, would mimic the life path of Sri Chand by becoming a lifelong celibate himself. Other sources claim Sri Chand remained on good-term with Nanak's successors.

Some of the Sikh Gurus, Guru Amardas, Guru Ramdas, Guru Arjan and Guru Hargobind who were contemporaries of Sri Chand held him in high esteem due to his descent, old age and piety. They also would gift Sri Chand presents. When Sri Chand paid a visit to the fourth Sikh guru, Ram Das, it is said the Sikh guru got-up to wipe Sri Chand's feet with his own beard as a show of deep respect for Sri Chand after Nanak's son made a remark about the Guru's long beard. According to Kesar Singh Chhiber, Sri Chand sent two turban to the Sikhs after the deaths of Guru Ram Das in 1581, one turban was for Prithi Chand and the other for Guru Arjan, to recognize the guru's succession to the Sikh guruship. Guru Arjan met with Sri Chand at Barath to request for compositions of Nanak in the possession of Sri Chand to assist with his project of compiling a Sikh scripture. In 1619, Sri Chand used his spiritual sway and authority to help convince Jahangir to release Guru Hargobind from his incarceration at Gwalior Fort.

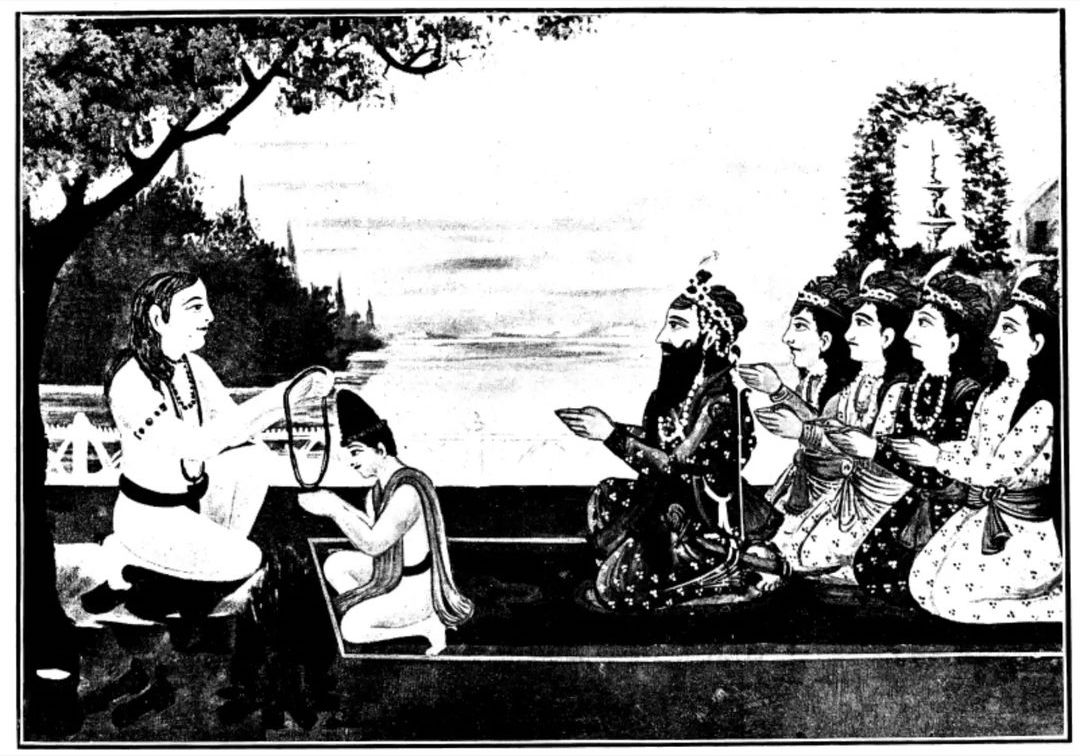
Painting of Baba Gurditta receiving the Udasi gaddi (seat of authority) from Baba Sri Chand, with Guru Hargobind and his other sons (Ani Rai, Suraj Mal, Atal Rai, and Tyag Mal) observing

Sri Chand shifted to Bartha in Pathankot district, Punjab. Guru Hargobind's eldest son, Baba Gurditta, was given to the Udasins at the behest of Baba Sri Chand, despite Gurditta being a house-holder and not a celebrate or ascetic. Sri Chand appointed Baba Gurditta as his successor in 1629. Baba Gurditta eventually replaced Baba Sri Chand as head of the Udasins after his death. Baba Gurditta was the father of Guru Hari Rai, the grandfather of Guru Har Krishan, and the elder half-brother of Guru Tegh Bahadur.

Sri Chand was there for the groundbreaking ceremony for the establishment of Kiratpur at the foothills of the Shivalik Range by Baba Gurditta on the orders of Guru Hargobind. Sri Chand broke the ground for the project himself. Sri Chand also participated in the cremation ceremony of Baba Buddha.

Ram Rai, son of Guru Har Rai joined the Udasin sect after a failed attempt of being an official eighth Guru of the Sikhs.

== Death ==
As per the Bhatt Bahis, Sri Chand died in Kiratpur on 13 January 1629. He had arranged Baba Gurditta to succeed him as the Udasi leader prior to his death. Some sources claim he died in 1643. According to Udasi beliefs, Sri Chand did not die but rather disappeared into the forests of Chamba in Himachal Pradesh after giving a final sermon to a Bhutanese disciple named Brahmaketu. Sri Chand's teachings and practices were continued by Baba Gurditta and the four Adi-Udasis, namely Almast, Balu Hasna, Goinda, and Phula.

== Philosophy of Sri Chand ==
Sri Chand's philosophy is known as Bhakti-Jnana Samuccaya. Sri Chand's conceptualization of the divine contained both Nirgun and Sargun aspects. Despite believing there to be a oneness to the divine, divinity could take birth in the form of an incarnation (avatāra). He affirmed both the concepts of karma (karma siddhanta) and rebirth (punarjanma). He considered both knowledge (jñāna mārga) and devotion (bhakti mārga) to be important in spirituality, as well as veneration of both the deities (deva pujā) and the spiritual teacher (guru pujā). Sri Chand promoted the worship of five Indic deities, them namely being Surya, Vishnu, Shiva, Ganesha, and Shakti (divine feminine cosmic energy and dynamic force of the Universe), a practice known as pancadevopasana. Sri Chand may have been motivated to do this to erase their denominational differences present amongst the Hindus at the time to slow the trend of Hindu converts to Islam.

Sri Chand also borrowed elements of his father's teachings and practices in his own sect, such as langar and sangat. Sri Chand considered the hymns authored by the subsequent Sikh gurus to be divine. Yet a key difference between Sri Chand's philosophy and that of the Sikh gurus laid in lifestyle, as Sri Chand promoted asceticism and celibacy whilst the Sikh gurus believed a familial, house-holder's life was ideal. Surjit Singh Gandhi claims that Sri Chand was unable to reconcile his father's teachings of being like an ascetic whilst still being engaged in the material and secular world, akin to a mental separation of sorts, with Sri Chand also preferring a physical separation to accompany it. For the Sikh gurus, God resided in all activities and places in life, thus it made no difference by becoming an ascetic and did not make one more spiritually advanced, one could venerate and worship the divine anywhere, yet Sri Chand did not follow this line of thinking in his own philosophical formulization. Sri Chand had observed his own father embarking on long journeys, he recognized that, yet he did not recognize that his father had also later in life stopped such trips and settled down in Kartarpur, living a more ordinary life. Sri Chand only held importance for the wandering ascetic aspect, not being engaged and part of the regular world. This key philosophical difference would be the main dividing element between the Udasis and mainstream Sikhs.

== Works authored ==
Sri Chand was a Sanskrit scholar who wrote commentaries on Hindu texts, such as the Vedas, Upanishads, and the Vedānta Sutras of Veda Vyāsa. A number of literary works are attributed to Sri Chand, such as:

- Arta Srī Guru Nānak Dev - consisting of ten verses in the padas format dedicated to Guru Nanak, his father
- Guru Gayatri - dedication to a spiritual preceptor
- Sahasranāma - one thousand names of the divine
- Pañcadevaṣṭakam - eight hymns dedicated to a quintet of deities (pañcadeva), namely Ganesha, Surya, Vishnu, Shiva, and Shakti
- Mātrāvāṇī or Matrāśāstra - exposition of Udasi philosophy in fifty-five verses

== Legacy ==
Sri Chand, who founded the Udasi sect, remains venerated by the Udasis, who claim him as their 165th sadhu in their traditional lineage. His name is mentioned in the Udasi versions of the daily aarti, ardaas, and jaikara.

The samadhi of Sri Chand was located at Dera Tahli Sahib in Lahore district near old Tahli tree, southeast of Lahore Railway Station, on the opposite side of the tracks (31°34'34.3"N 74°20'27.1"E) but it can no longer be found today. A shrine dedicated to Sri Chand can be found in Pakhoke Randhāve in Gurdaspur district, Punjab. At this shrine, there is a śiśama tree linked to Sri Chand. At Faqir Jo Goth in Thatta, Sindh, an idol of Sri Chand can be found.

== Gallery ==
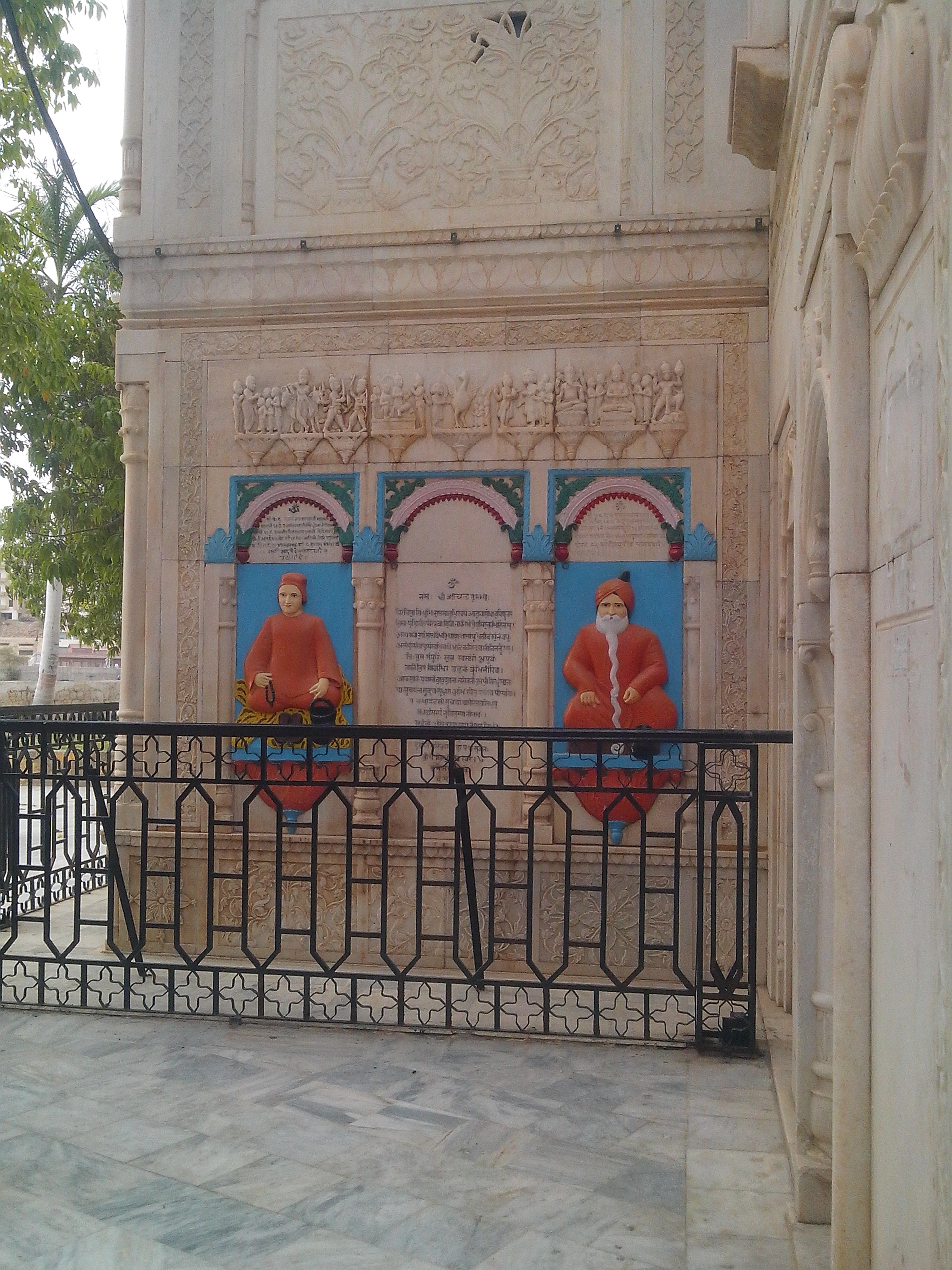
Memorials to Udasin mahants of Sadh Belo with an invocation to Sri Chand, the founder of Udasins.

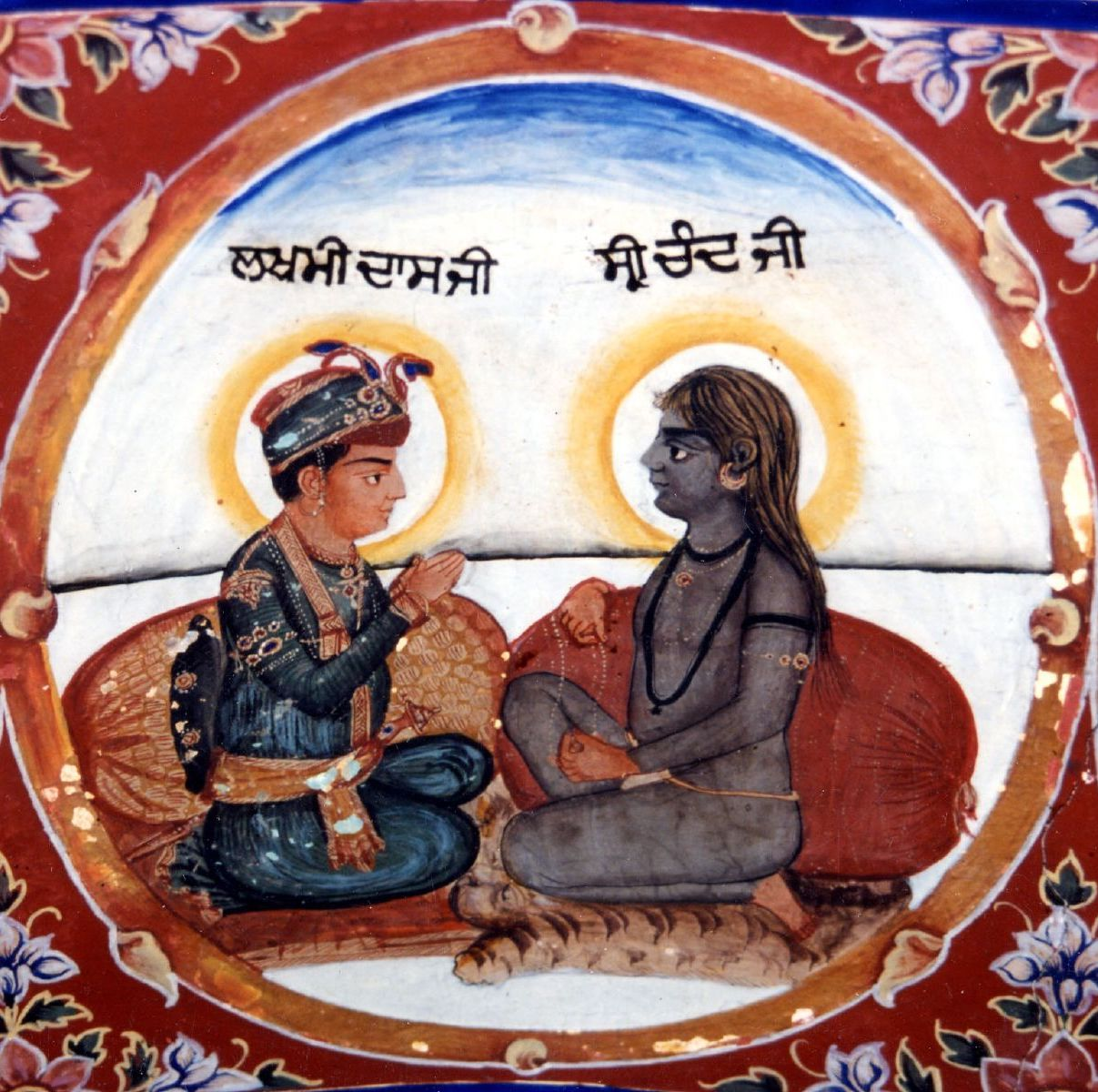
Sri Chand (right) seated with his brother Lakhmi Das (left). Fresco from Gurdwara Baba Atal in Amritsar

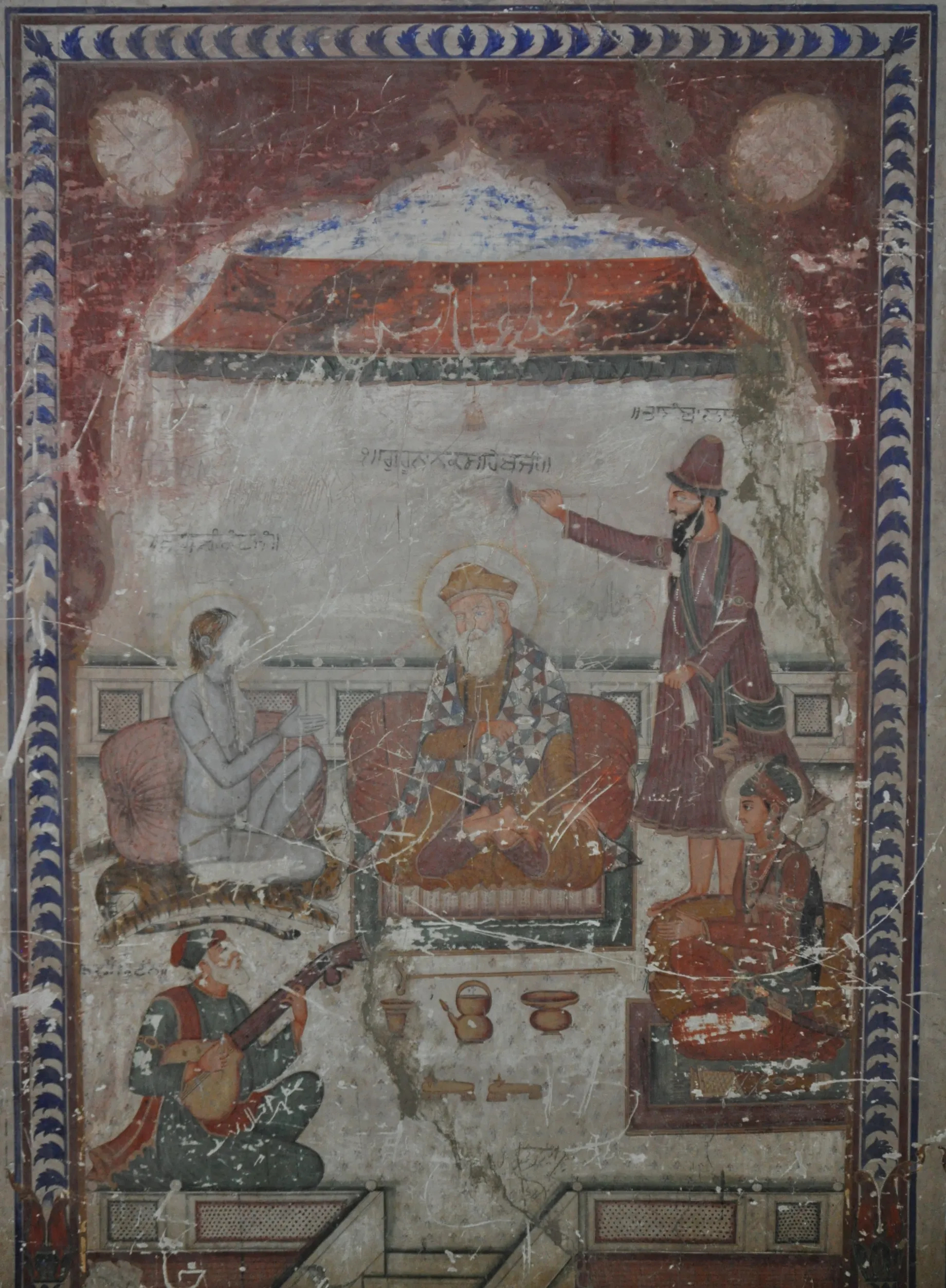
Fresco of Guru Nanak, Sri Chand, Bhai Mardana, Bhai Bala, and possibly Lakhmi Das from a Punjabi haveli, circa 1850's

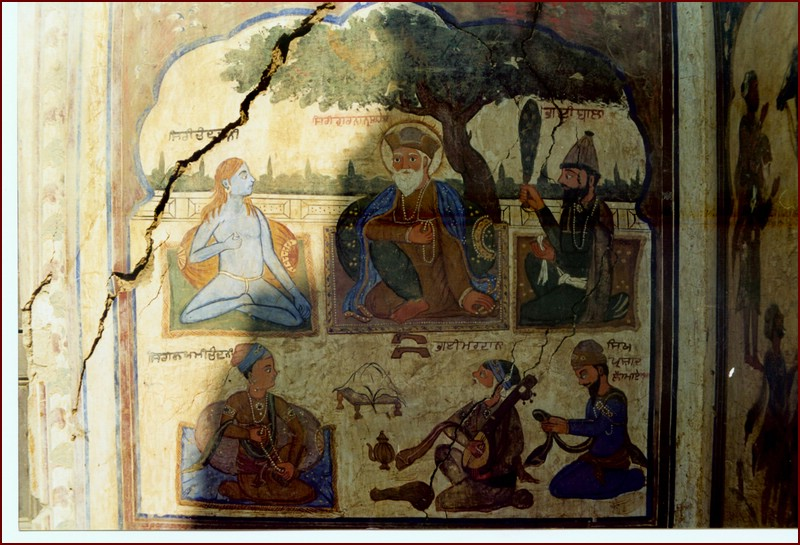
Fresco of Sri Chand seated to the left of Guru Nanak, from Pothimala, Guru Harsahai, circa 18th century

== See also ==
- Sri Chand Darbar

== Bibliography ==
- O. P. Ralhan (2004). Srichandraji Maharaj. Anmol Publications. ISBN 978-81-261-1828-1.
