= Mata Sulakhni =

Wife of Guru Nanak (1473–1545)

- ਮਾਤਾ ਸੁਲਖਨੀ
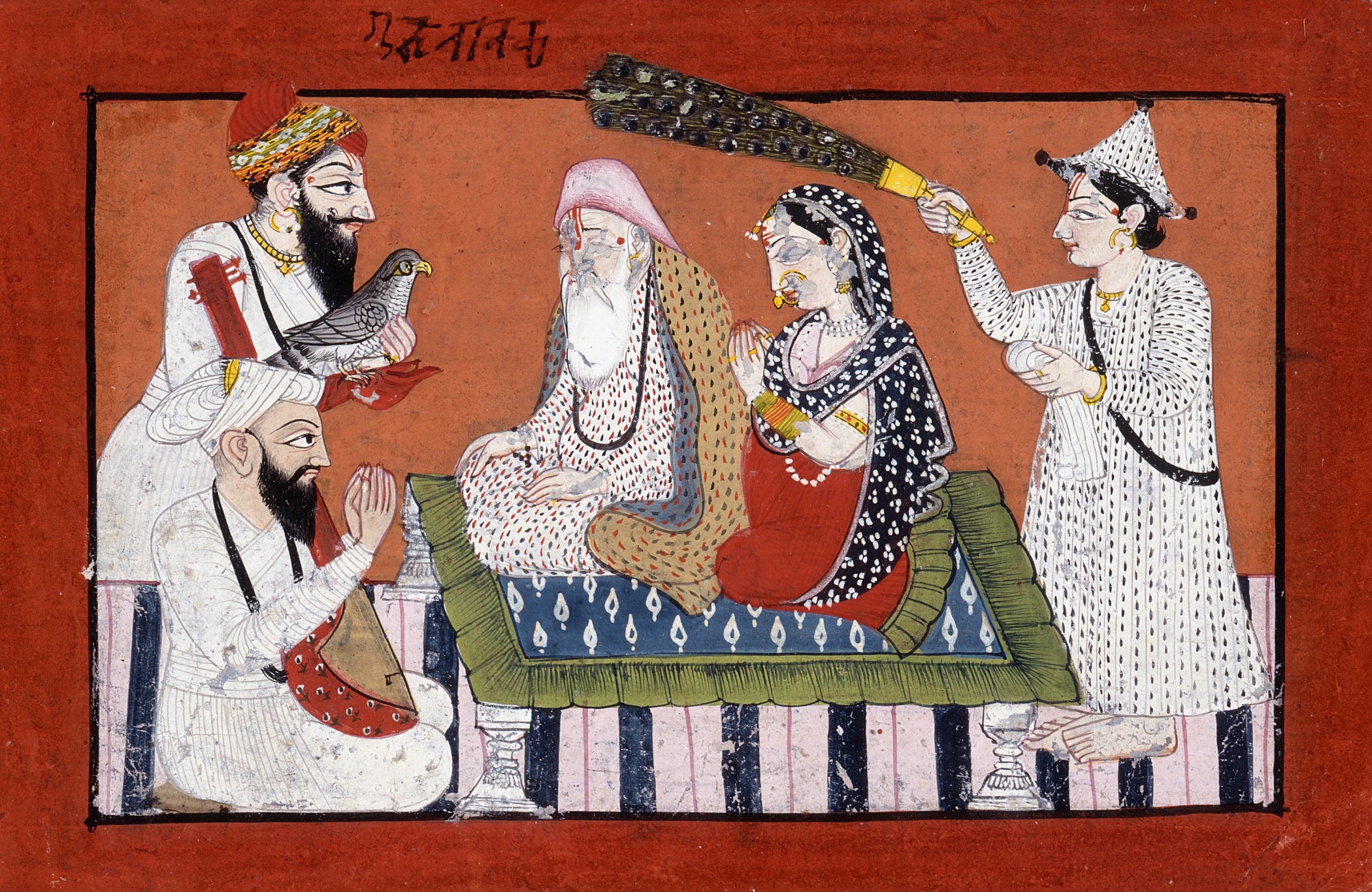
- Sulakhni seated beside Guru Nanak in a circa 1780 painting from Mandi

Personal life
- Born: Ghummi Chona; 1473 Pakhoke
- Died: 1545 (aged 71–72) Kartarpur
- Spouse: Guru Nanak
- Children: Sri Chand (born 1494); Lakhmi Das (born 1497)
- Parent(s): Mūl Chand Chona (father); Chando Rani (mother)

Religious life
- Religion: Sikhism

Sulakhni (1473–1545), also known as Choni and often referred as Mata Sulakhni ("Mother Sulakhni"), was the wife of Guru Nanak, the founder of Sikhism.

== Name ==
In certain Janamsakhi traditions, such as the Merharban Wali Janamsakhi, Mata Sulakhni is known as Ghummi. In the Bala Janamsakhi, her name is given as Sulakhni. Surjit Singh Gandhi theorized that Gummi is a corrupted form of Choni, the name of her clan (Chona). He further speculates that she was known as Ghummi in her birth house but went by the name Sulakhni at her in-laws house. She is also known by the name of Kulamai. According to Kahn Singh Nabha in his Mahan Kosh, only girls with super characteristics were given the name of Sulakhni.

== Biography ==
=== Family background ===
The father of Sulakhni was Mūl Chand, a Chona Khatri, whilst her mother was Chando Rani. (Note: Her mother is also referred to as 'Mata Chando'.) Her father held a minor revenue office in the village of Pakkhoke Randhave (Pakhokhi village) in what is today the Gurdaspur district of the Punjab. (Note: The name of the village is alternatively spelt as 'Pakkhoke Randhawa'.) She was born into a Hindu family in the village of Pakkhoke.

=== Marriage ===
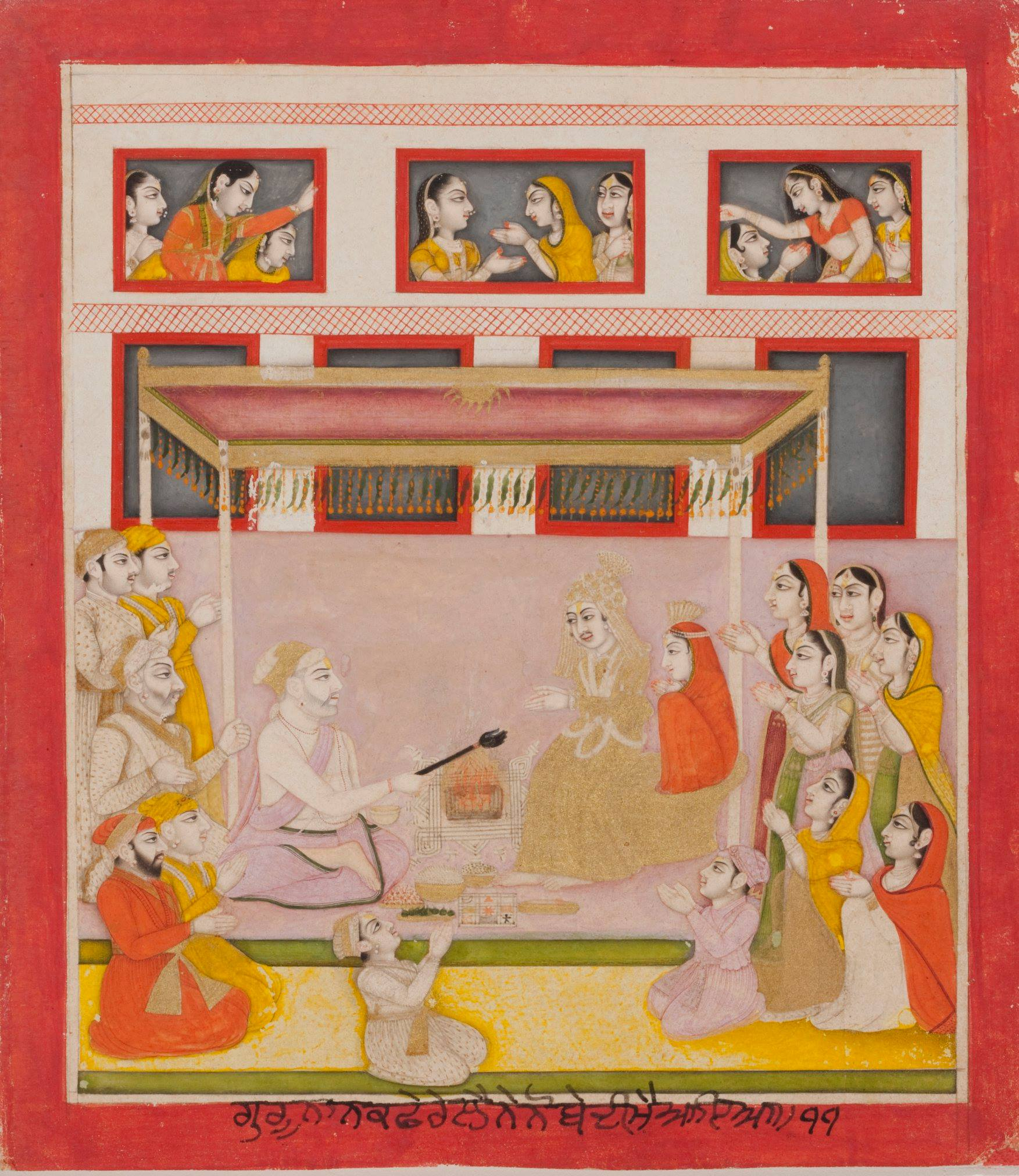
Wedding of Guru Nanak and Sulakhni. From the Unbound set of Janamsakhi paintings, ca.1755–1800

The marriage of Sulakhni to Nanak was arranged by Jai Ram, the brother-in-law of Nanak. She was selected by Nanak's father partly due to her apparently "comely" appearance. She was wedded to Guru Nanak on 24 September 1487. In that time period, it was custom for girls to be four to five years younger than the boy their marriage was arranged to. Nanak would have been around eighteen years old at the time of their marriage. The location the wedding itself occurred is disputed and given various locations amid Sikh sources but more likely took place in Batala. (Note: The Bhai Bala Janamsakhi states the wedding took place in Sultanpur (which is unlikely as per Khatri marriage customs of the time). The Nanak Bans Prakash states the wedding took place in Talwandi. The Meharban Janamsakhi and Gyan Ratnavali states the wedding took place in Batala.)

It is noted in Sikh lore that Mata Sulakhni's family had conflicts with Nanak, with an example of such regarding the manner of which the marriage ceremony would be performed. Sulakhni's father, Mul Chand Chona, was unwavering about his desire to have a traditional marriage ceremony for his daughter and was opposed to Nanak's innovations. He taunted Nanak to convince the Brahmins to agree to his proposals. Whilst talking with the Brahmins, Nanak is said to have been seated beside an frail mud wall (kandh) on a rainy day, which was dangerous as the wall could have collapsed as a result. Sulakhni warned Nanak through a courier about this but Nanak retorted that the wall will never fall down for centuries. A surviving portion of the wall is believed to be preserved within the Kandh Sahib Gurdwara encased in a glass shield. Nanak is said to have bested the Brahmins in the discourse and thus the marriage ceremony went along as per his design.

When Nanak left for Sultanpur Lodhi for employment, Sulakhni remained at Talwandi until he earned enough and invited her to join him at Sultanpur in around the year 1488. After she came to Sultanpur, her and her husband moved into a new house in the locality.

=== Life as a mother ===
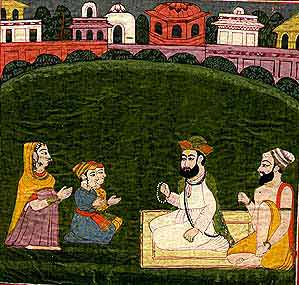
Janamsakhi painting depicting Guru Nanak visiting Mata Sulakhni and his two sons

Sulakhni gave birth to two sons, Sri Chand, in 1494 and Lakhmi Das, in 1497. (Note: Other sources give Sri Chand's birth date as 1491 and Lakhmi Das' as 1496.) According to Udasi lore, it is said she had an envisage of Shiva whilst giving birth to Sri Chand. Her son, Sri Chand, would later go on to become a renowned spiritual leader himself. At some point, Nanak's father, Mehta Kalu, tried to tempt his son with the possibility of taking on a second wife but Nanak purportedly refused to entertain the idea as he thought Sulakhni was the most suitable wife for him, having been chosen by God to be his partner, and wanted to stay with her until death. She lived an ordinary life of a trading-class housewife at Sultanpur until the year 1499 or 1502, when her husband's religious preaching began after the River Bein episode. After one of Guru Nanak's udasis (travels), it is said he met-up with Sulakhni, their sons, and his father-in-law in Pakhokhi village. Sulakhni had expressed her desire to accompany Nanak but remained at home to tend to and raise their sons. She was reportedly a devouted wife and mother, who fully supported her husband's spiritual path and partook in it full-heatedly as a devotee herself.

=== Kartarpur chapter ===
After the founding of Kartarpur by Nanak, Sulakhni moved there with him and was responsible for providing food and ensuring a comfortable stay for the visitors who came to see her husband and those who decided to remain there to live with him. Besides this, she also worked the farmland with her husband, was a cook, and served in the langar (community kitchen). When Nanak chose Lehna as his successor rather than one of their sons, she was apparently displeased with the decision. She survived her husband for a few years and died in 1545 at Kartarpur.

== Legacy ==
Nanak himself shared a close bond with his wife, which may have impacted his egalitarian and progressive views towards women.

Amrita Pritam, a Punjabi poet, wrote the following poem about Sulakhni, specifically regarding her spiritual life as a wife of a religious man and raising of two sons alone when her husband was travelling:

I was a shadow and am one still

I've travelled with the Sun on His course:

Have drunk of His glory

And bathed in a stream full of His light.

— Amrita Pritam (1989; 116–117), Introducing World Religions (2009) by Victoria Kennick Urubshurow, pages 436–437
