= Gurdwara Baba Atal =

Sikh temple in Amritsar, India

Coordinates: 31°37′02″N 74°52′38″E

Gurdwara Baba Atal Rai ਗੁਰਦੁਆਰਾ ਬਾਬਾ ਅਟੱਲ ਰਾਏ
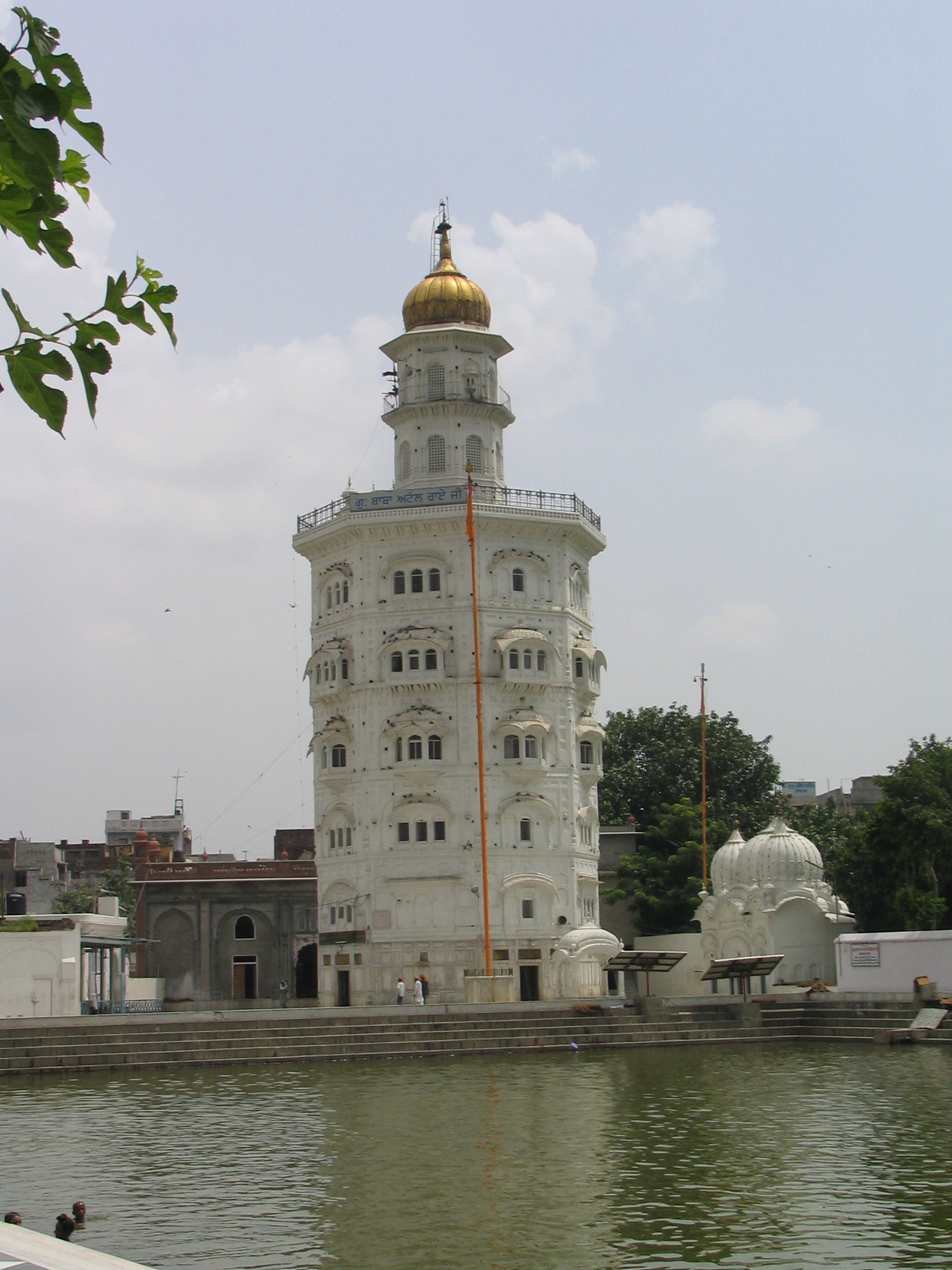
- Baba Atal
- Interactive map of the Gurdwara Baba Atal Rai ਗੁਰਦੁਆਰਾ ਬਾਬਾ ਅਟੱਲ ਰਾਏ area

General information
- Architectural style: Sikh architecture
- Location: Amritsar, India
- Completed: early 17th century (samadhi); late 18th or early 19th century (nine-story tower)

Gurdwārā Bābā Aṭṭal Rāi (Punjabi pronunciation: [ɡʊɾᵊd̪ʊäːɾäː bäbːäː əʈəllːə̆]) is a famous Gurdwara in Amritsar dedicated to Atal Rai, a son of Guru Hargobind and Mata Nanaki. It consists of nine stories and is around forty metres in height. It is just a short walk from the famous Harmandir Sahib.

== Location ==
The structure is located in the southern direction of the Golden Temple. It is approximately 135 metres away from the Sarai Guru Ram Das building.

== Architecture ==
The building is octagonal in shape, with a double-octagonal structure. The tower is ascended by 110-steps, with seven stories in full-size. One octagonal structure is the bigger of the two and rises externally and the other, smaller one rises internally, with the external one being circumambulatory to the interior one. The accompanying stories of the exterior octagonal structure ceases after the sixth floor, but they continue until the ninth for the interior octagonal structure. The ninth floor is topped off with a golden dome. A double staircase, using the wall breadth, takes one to the top of the building. At the ground floor, there are four entry doors on each of the main directions. The main entrance of these four entry doors is the one facing in the eastward direction. There is a central room on the ground floor that also has four doors and the Guru Granth Sahib is displayed within this room placed on a brass canopy. The doors of the structure are brass and silver and feature intricate embossed artwork on them. There are various brass plaques, which are embossed, depicting Sikh and Hindu themes throughout the structure. Groupings of three embossed brass plaques are adhered to each of the four exterior doors.

== History ==
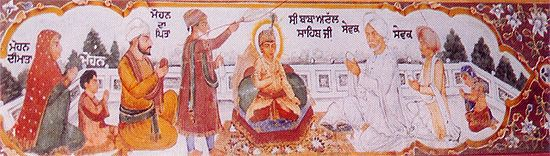
Fresco depicting Baba Atal Rai, son of Guru Hargobind, surrounded by other figures, from Gurdwara Baba Atal in Amritsar, circa late-19th century. One of the depicted figures is Mohan, whom Atal is said to have revived through the performance of a miracle after Mohan died from a snake-bite.

Built some four centuries ago, the Baba Atal Gurdwara is commemoration of the young life of Baba Atal Rai (1619–1628), the son of Guru Hargobind. Its nine stories echo his nine years of life before his death in 1628. According to Sikh legend narrated in the Gurbilas Chhevin Patshahi, Atal Rai revived a friend named Mohan who was bitten by a snake and subsequently died as a result of the injury. Upon hearing the news of the event, his father was displeased as the performance of miracles is rebuked by the Sikh gurus. After being admonished by his father for the miracle, Atal Rai retired himself to the bank of Kaulsar and died on 13 September 1628 with the aim of leaving this world. His remains were cremated on the bank of Kaulsar. The tower was built in his memory and to commemorate his short life. Even though Atal Rai died as a child, he was given the honorific 'baba', usually given to aged and respected men, in commemoration for his spiritual powers.

Initially a small samadhi (Indic cenotaph) was constructed at the site, which eventually transformed into a gurdwara. In India, it is a common practice for the tombs of saintly individuals to be gradually transformed into religious shrines as time goes by. It was during the time of Maharaja Ranjit Singh that the present-day, nine-story tower was constructed. However, Kanwarjit Singh Kang believes the present-day tower had been erected between circa 1775–1800 (last quarter of the 18th century). According to Sundar Singh Ramgarhia, the foundation of the site was laid-down in 1779. Repairs, extensions, and renovations to the structure were conducted in the coming years from time to time. The first two stories of the tower were constructed under the purview and direction of Jodh Singh Ramgarhia. Whilst the remaining stories were constructed by various sardars of notability and public donations. The guilt-dome at the top of the tower was presented by Desa Singh Majithia. In a report from 1881, Henry Hardy Cole notes the site, concerned about the deterioration of its wood carvings, and states that the edifice was under restoration work by the Sikh temple management of Amritsar.

The gurdwara was famed for its langar and many pilgrims and destitute people visited it to partake in it, where it was freely distributed to all visitors. This led to the coining of a saying related to Baba Atal in the local Amritsari vernacular:

Bābā Atall,
pakkīā̃ pakāīā̃ chall.

— local Amritsari saying
Translation:

Baba Atal sends prepared meals.

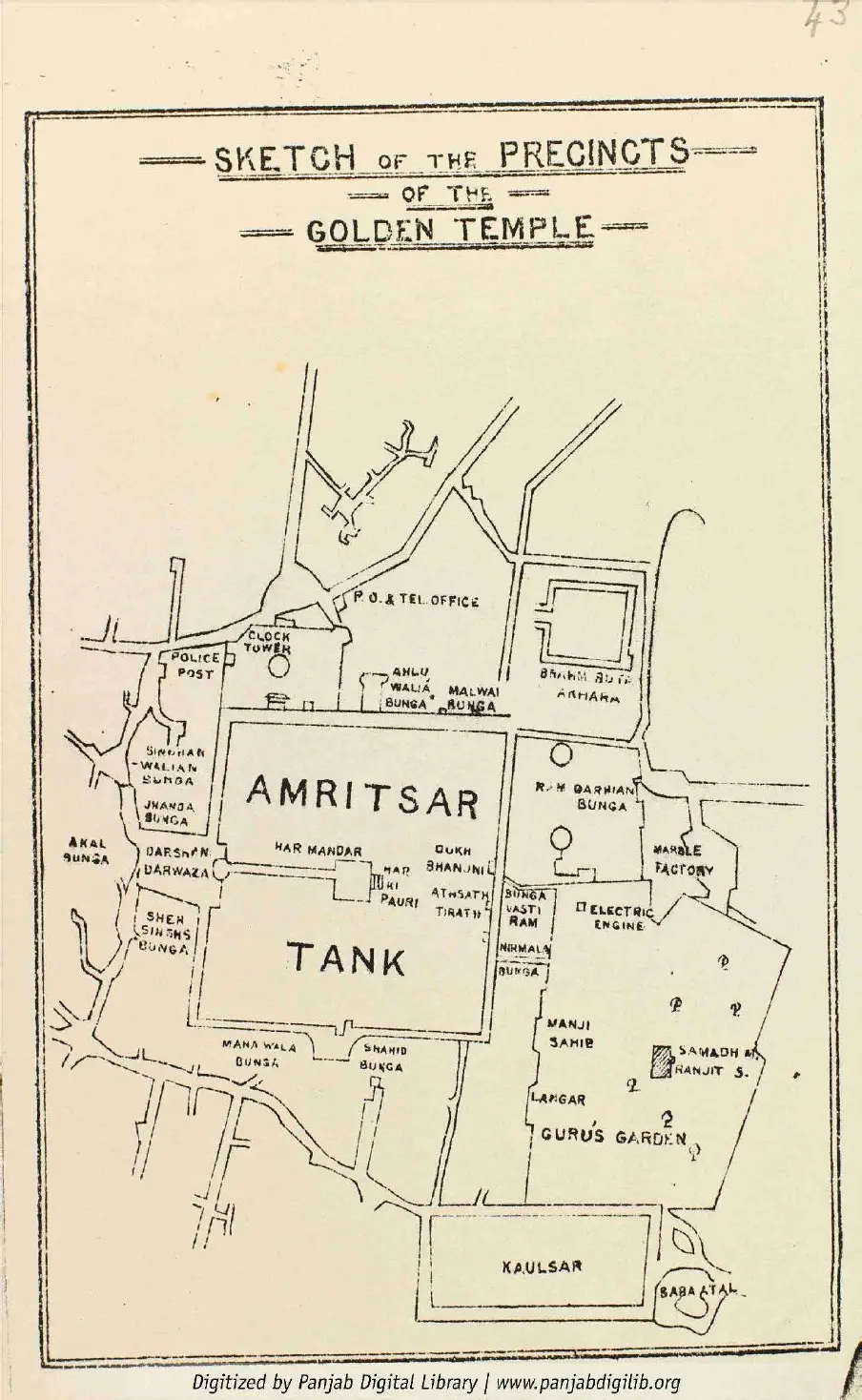
Sketch map of the Golden Temple complex in Amritsar, published in Sundar Singh Ramgarhia's Guide to the Darbar Sahib or Golden Temple of Amritsar (1903)

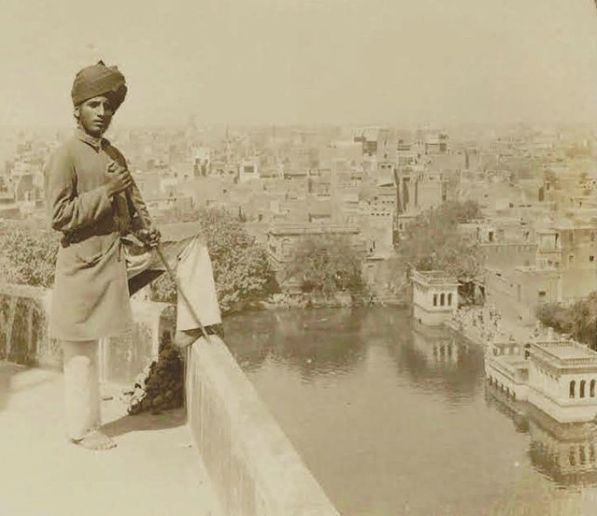
Photograph taken from a high-vantage point of the skyline of the city of Amritsar, 1903

In 1903, the following views were possible from the vantage point of the top of the tower:

- Northward: on the left-side one could witness the spire of the civil-station church poking out from trees. In-front and closer to the tower, were cupolas of the municipal hall and the red-brick range of the municipal school. The two watch-towers of the Ramgarhia Bunga could be viewed. On the right-side in the northward direction, the spire of Virbhan's Thakurdwara (Vaishnavite temple) could be seen, further still lay the village of Vairka, and far in the distance the snowy Himalayan mountain-range was visible. The Ahluwalia Fort could be seen in the northwest.
- Eastward: the town of Jandiala located ten miles away could be seen, along with prominent architectural structures located within it, such as white-spires of the local Jain temple. 13 miles off from it one could see Gurdwara Tarn Taran. Located in the foreground was the little, white shrine of Babeksar and the Ramgarhia cemetery to its right.
- Westward: the rooftop of Raja Teja Singh's temple and a union-jack flying from the Gobindgarh Fort to the right of the temple.
- Southward: Ramgarhia fortress of Ram Rauni to the southeast and Qila Bhangian to the southwest.

There were formerly cenotaphs (samadh) located in the courtyard of Gurdwara Baba Atal, with the one immediately south of the structure being for Baba Mohan (who Baba Atal had revived as per the tale) and in the east the cenotaphs of Nawab Kapur Singh of the Faizalpuria Misl and Jodh Singh (Adalati). Another cenotaph located in the southward direction was Jassa Singh Ahluwalia's. To the west was the cenotaph of Ganda Singh, which contained a mural of Baba Atal. To the northwest lay the cenotaph of Sant Singh Giani, which contained murals depicting Indic deities. On the other-side of the southern buildings was a cremation-ground and various other cenotaphs. Around the Kaulsar tank, there were trees which were inhabited by bats.

== Artwork ==
=== Murals ===
Video of frescoes from the upper-stories of Gurdwara Baba Atal

The tower contains Sikh art consisting of many mural paintings of important figures and events from Sikh history. Especially numerous are artwork relating to the life of Guru Nanak, as relayed in the Janamsakhi literature. The first fresco painting in the series depicts Indic deities requesting the divine to send a worthy person to humanity to bring them out of Kalyug (age of darkness). The last fresco painting in the series depicts Guru Nanak appointing Guru Angad as his successor in the guru gaddi ceremony. Scenes from Guru Nanak's childhood are also depicted, such as him at school. One fresco depicts the Sahibzadas, the four sons of Guru Gobind Singh. Other themes of the frescoes are depictions of prominent Sikh shaheeds (martyrs). There further existed murals depicting Baba Atal and the Battle of Muktsar. One painting depicted all of the ten Sikh gurus. Another mural displayed the entire lineage of the prominent Sikh saint, Baba Buddha. There also existed portrayals of both Sri Chand and Lakhmi Das, the sons of Guru Nanak. Disfigured paintings were also observed on the front wall of a structure adjacent to the tower known as the toshākhānā (treasury). Most of the figuratives depicted in the murals are shown in profile-view, except for Nanak. Colours and materials used to paint the images were Indian red, ochre, other earthly colours, and touchings of gold.

According to Satpal Danish, the artwork had originally been commissioned and completed during Sikh rule in the 19th century. Some of the artists who painted the frescoes back then were Jaimal Singh Naqqash, Mehtab Singh Naqqash, Amar Singh, Buta Singh, and Hukum Singh. Many of the murals that had been painted by Mehtab Singh were located on the first-story of the structure. Michael Edwardes had dated the mural paintings of the tower to the early 19th century but this dating was rebuked by Kanwarjit Singh Kang, who rather dates them later to the last decade of the 19th century (1890s) since Mehtab Singh, a traditional Sikh muralist who was born in 1871, had worked on them. Kang also provides other arguments for his later dating of the artwork: 1) the style of the Gurmukhi calligraphy inscribed on the paintings belong to his suggested late 19th century dating, and, 2) there exists a painting that depicts and references a certain Pandit Brij Nath, a supposed teacher shown as instructing Nanak in the image but references to this person only began to exist in Janamsakhi literature produced in and after the early 19th century. Art critic K. C. Aryan considered the murals of Gurdwara Baba Atal to be "inferior" to those of Virbhan-da-Shivala and the temple of Maiyanatha.

=== Embossed metal ===
Embossed brass plaques were donated by worshipers beginning in the middle of the 19th century onwards as a sign of their devotion. Some of these embossed plaques are inscribed with the names and addresses of the devotee who donated them and the date of the donation. One plaque even contains an monogram wrought in brass identifying the craftsman who created it. These embossed brass plaques were likely crafted by the Thathera guilds and craftsman that were located in the Kucha Fakirkhana neighbourhood of Amritsar. Four of the plaques depicted Guru Gobind Singh in various stages of the religion's development and scenes.

=== Conservation ===
Many of the paintings have been damaged or decayed in the decades since Indian independence due to apathy to them or deliberate defacement. Historical frescoes have been whitewashed or covered by bathroom tiles and plaster during supposed "kar seva" renovations in the structure. In 1971, poor-quality "renovations" led to the murals being repainted with gaudy paint made with artificial chemicals rather than using the naturally-sourced, traditional method of producing paint. This led to the decay in quality of many of the works and artificially-sourced paint is not as hardy or long lasting as compared to naturally-sourced paint. Renovations of kar seva babas continue to threaten the unprotected works and they are slowly disappearing. By 1988, only around 42 fresco panels survived in the structure with the rest having been destroyed. The murals located at the first entrance of the shrine (known as deohri) were in an advanced state of neglect, vandalism, and decay. There used to a fresco located on the wall to the left of the large, entrance-door that depicted the life-story of Baba Atal.

== Gallery ==
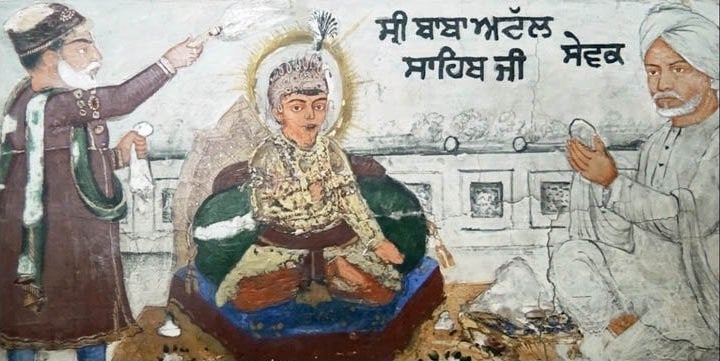
Mural fresco depiction of Baba Atal Rai (centre) located in Gurdwara Baba Atal

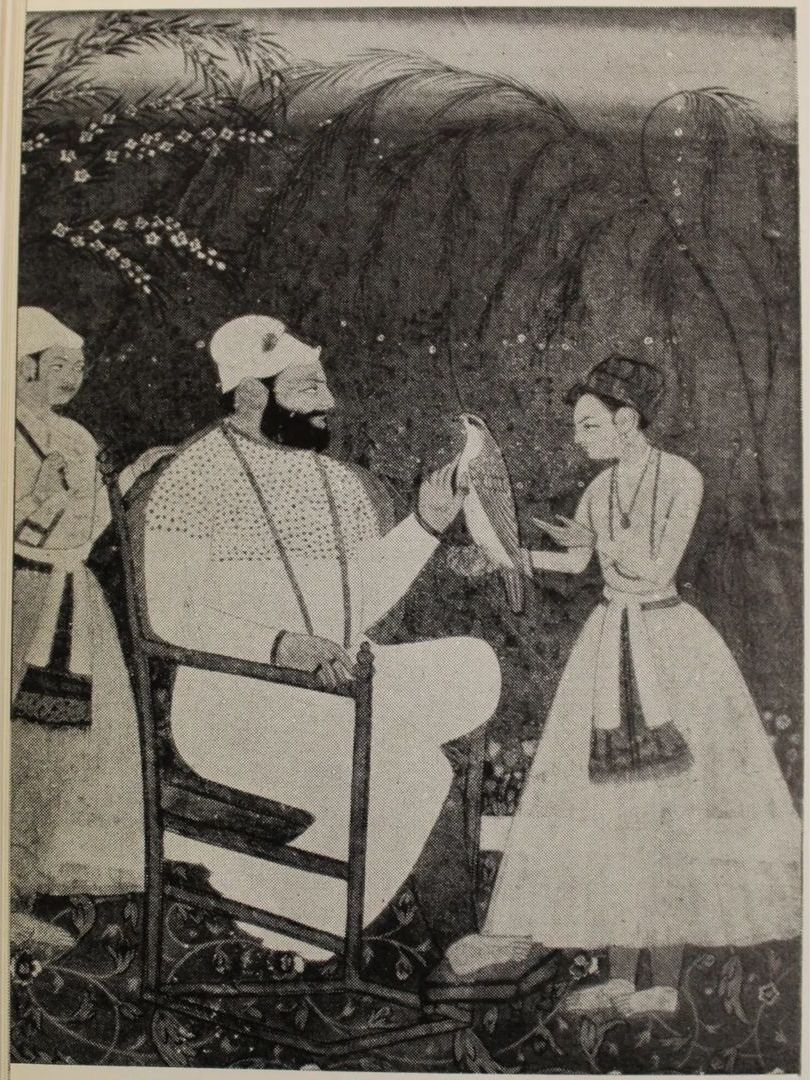
Guru Hargobind (middle) depicted alongside Ani Rai (left) and Atal Rai (right)

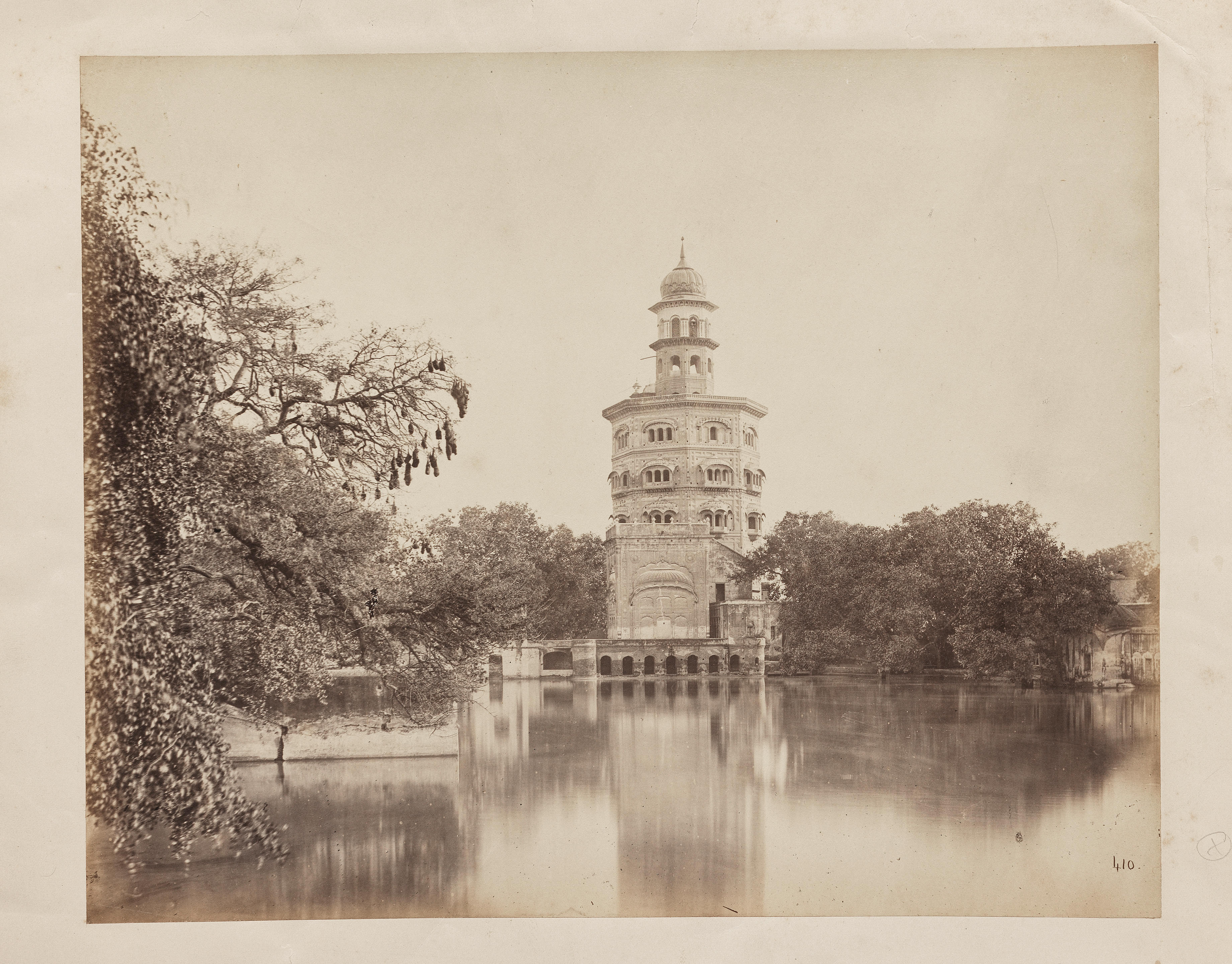
Photograph of Gurdwara Baba Atal and the tank of Kaulsar in Amritsar by Bourne & Shepherd, circa 1863–64

Woodcut of a Sikh family visiting Gurdwara Baba Atal, Amritsar (circa 1870)

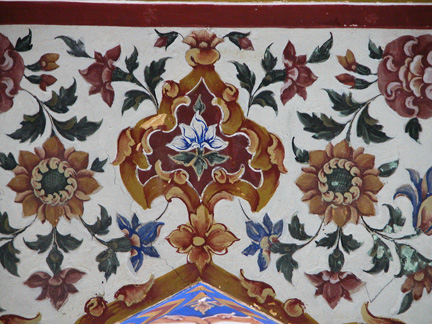
Fresco painting of floral motifs

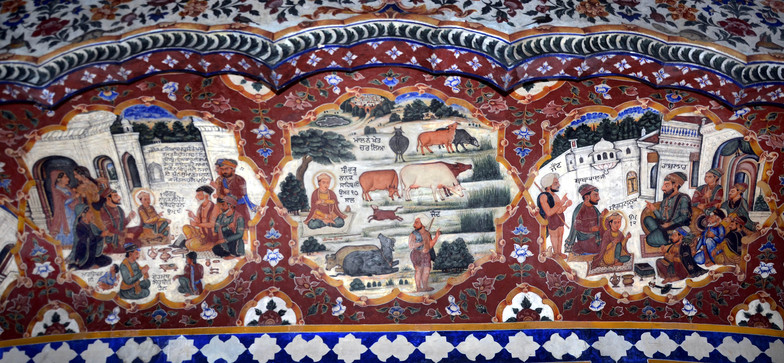
Frescoes depicting events related to the life of Guru Nanak

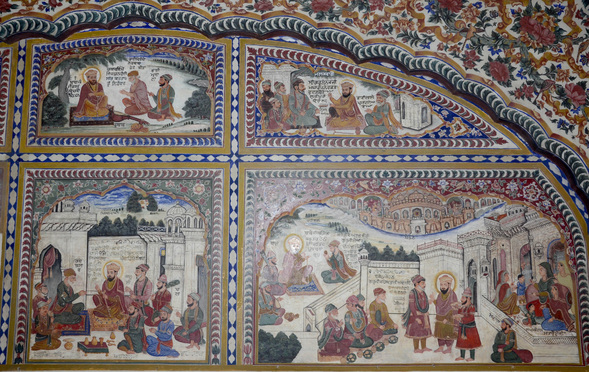
Frescoes depicting events related to the life of Guru Nanak

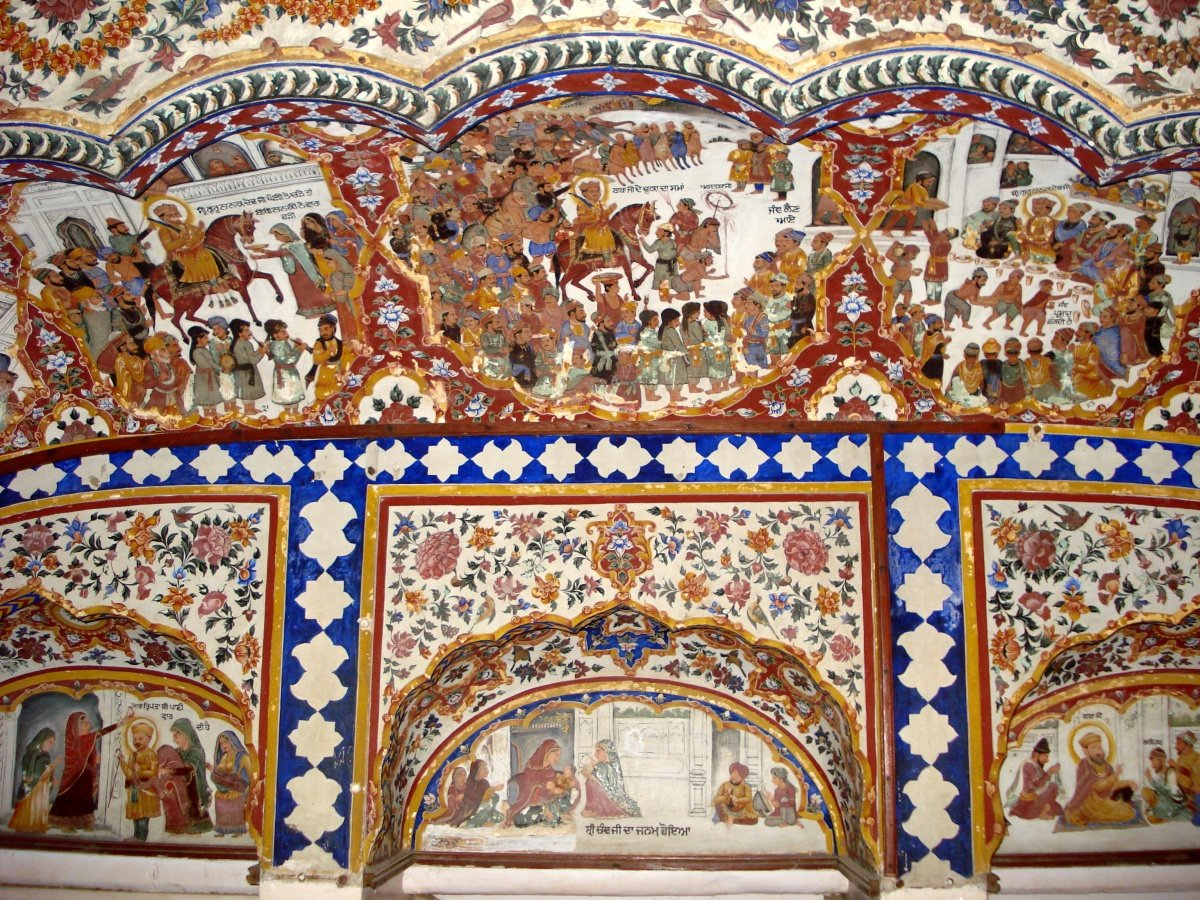
Frescoes depicting events related to the life of Guru Nanak

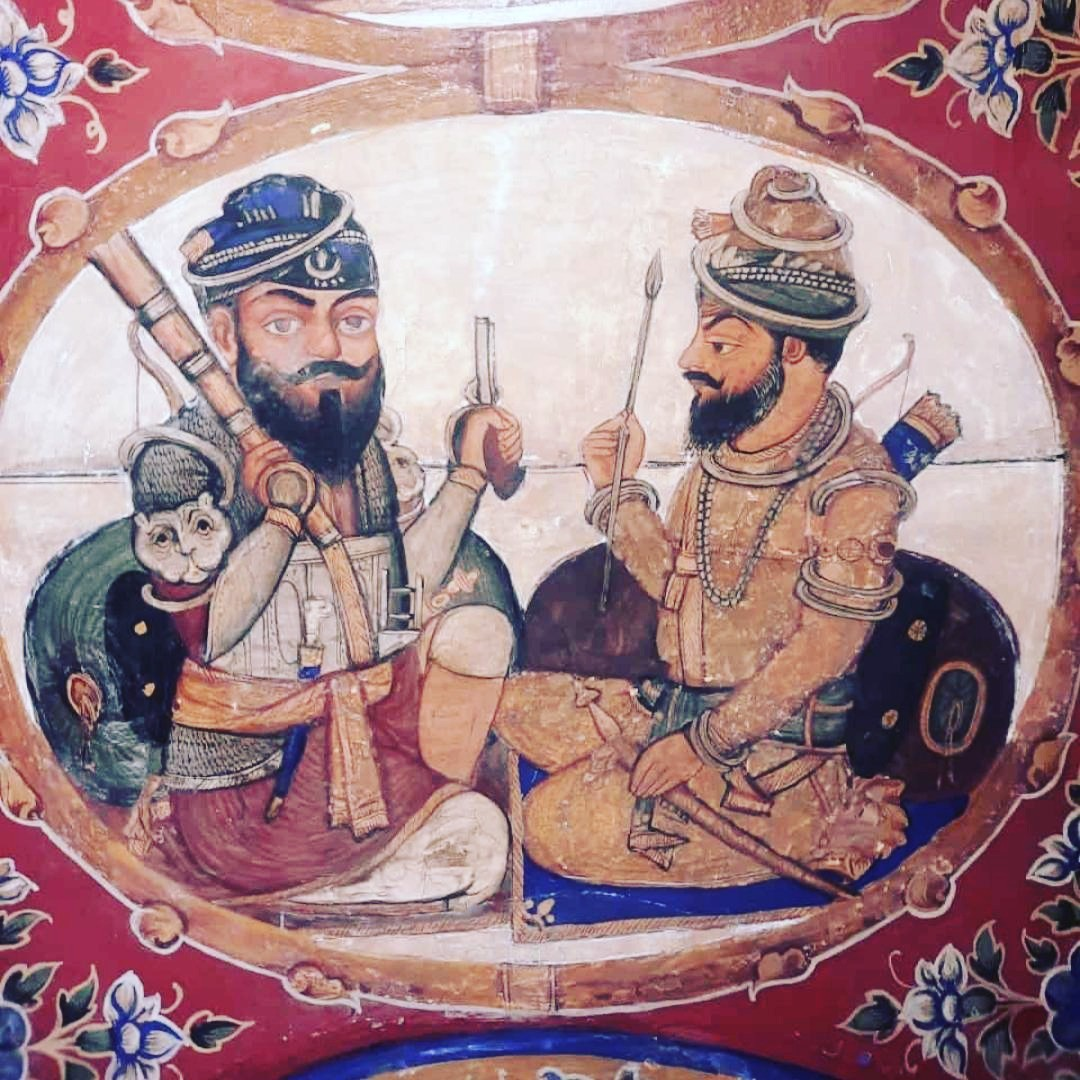
Fresco of Shaheed Singhs from Gurdwara Baba Atal

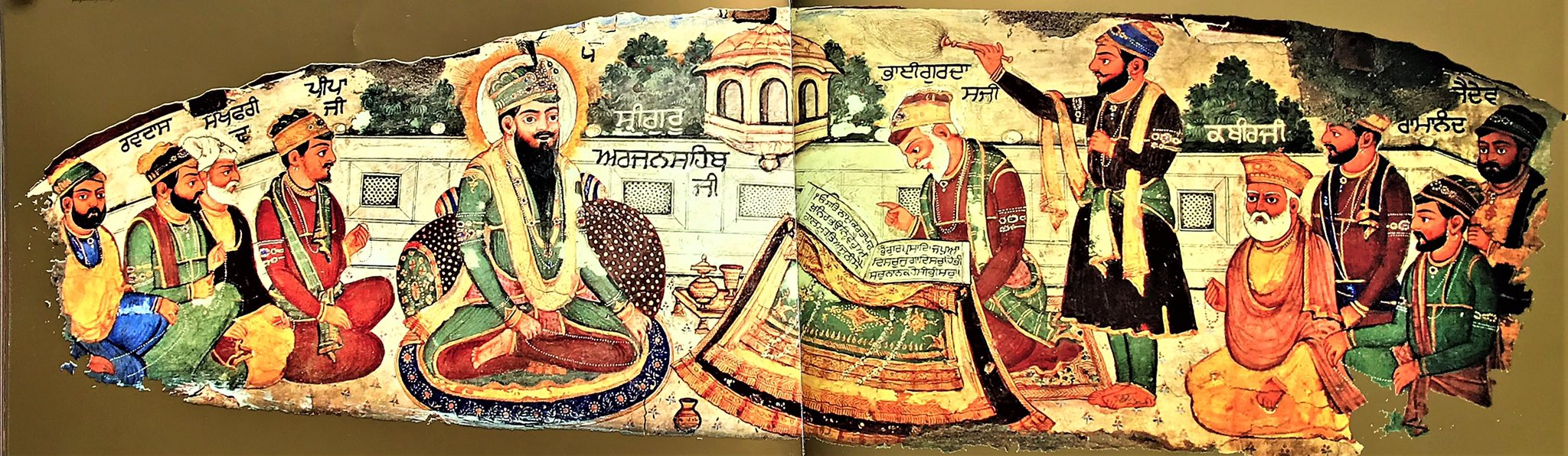
Fresco of the compilation of the Adi Granth

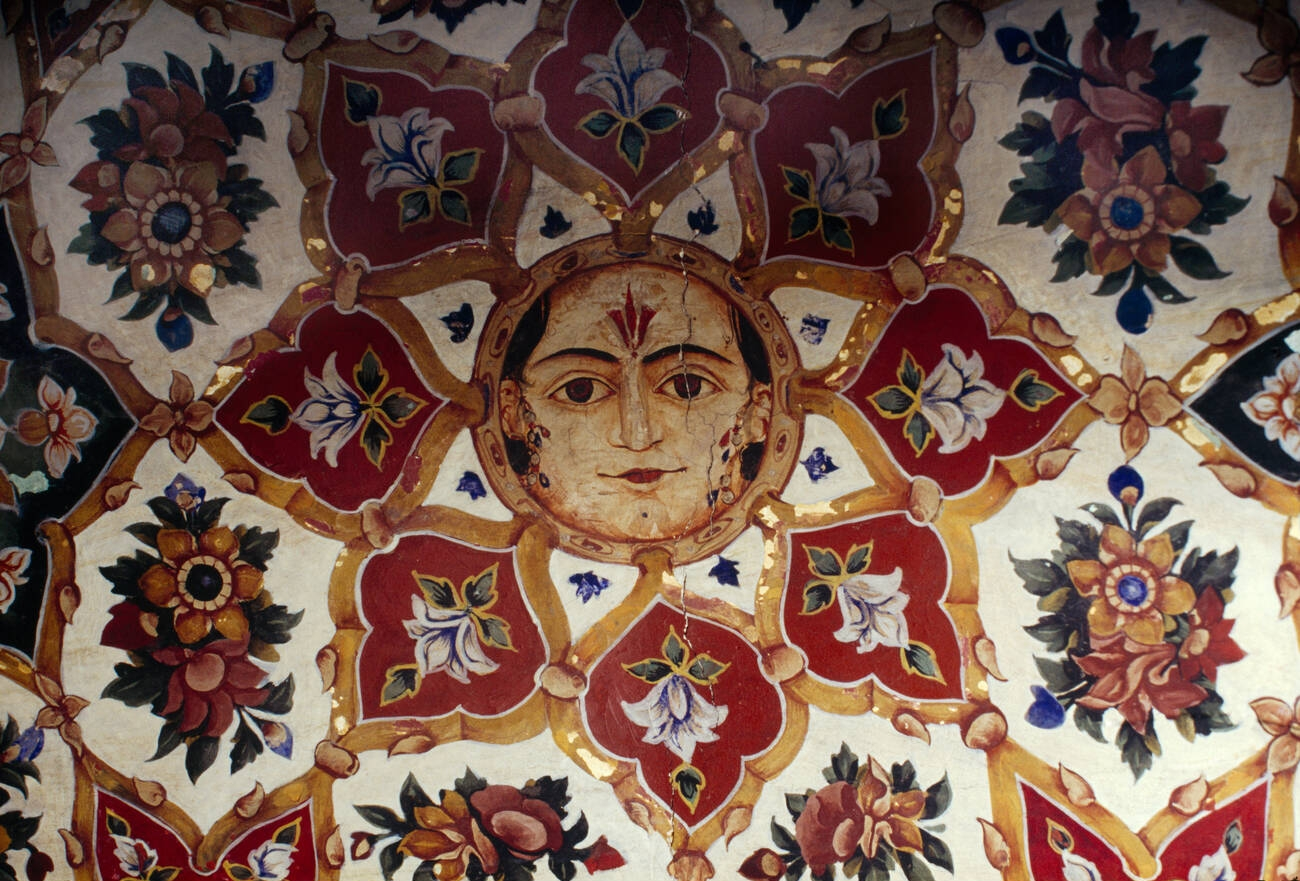
Ceiling fresco from Gurdwara Baba Atal

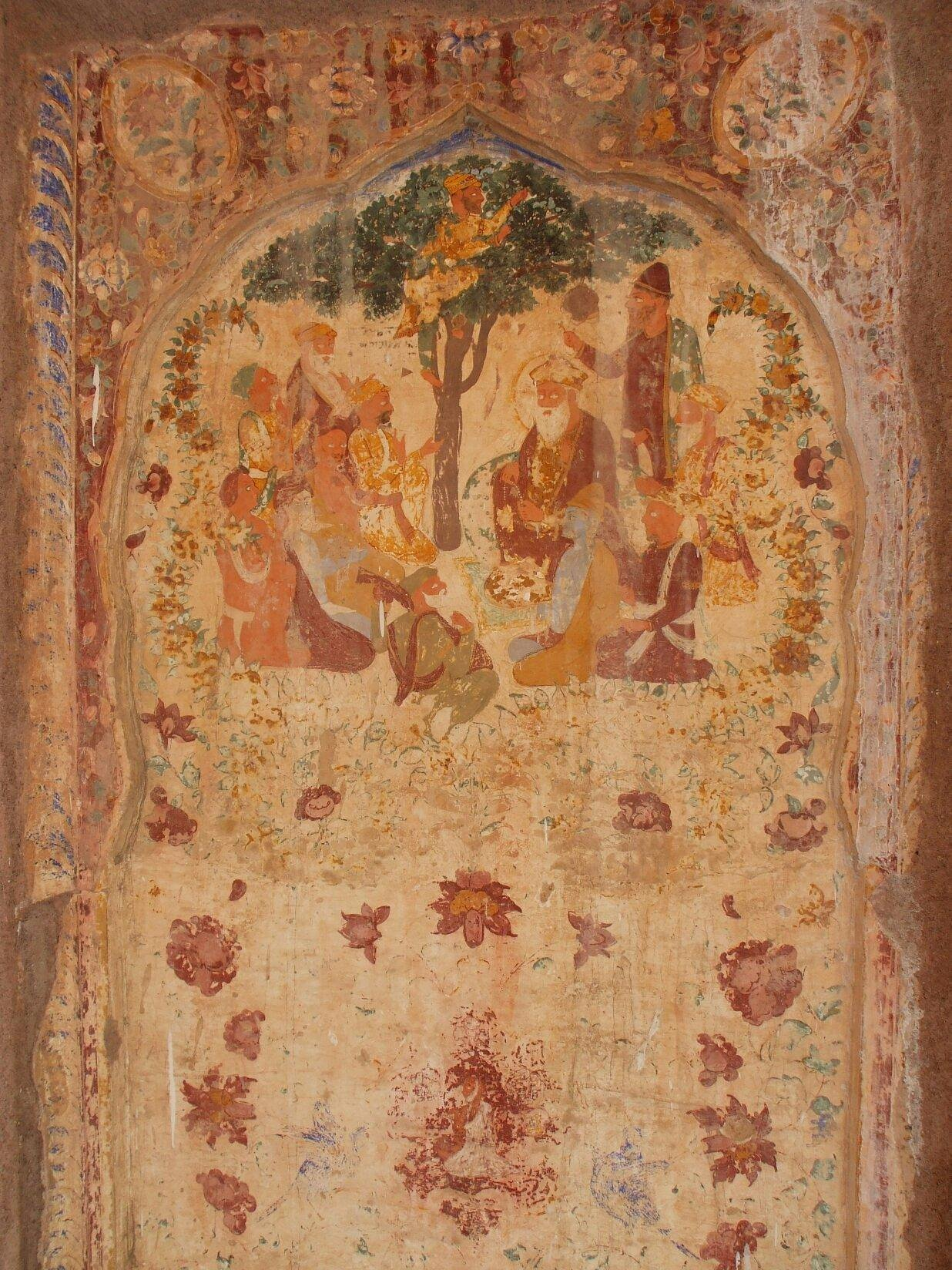
Decaying and dilapidated fresco

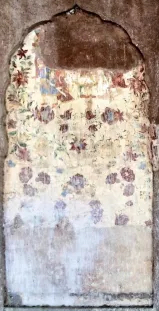
Decaying and dilapidated fresco

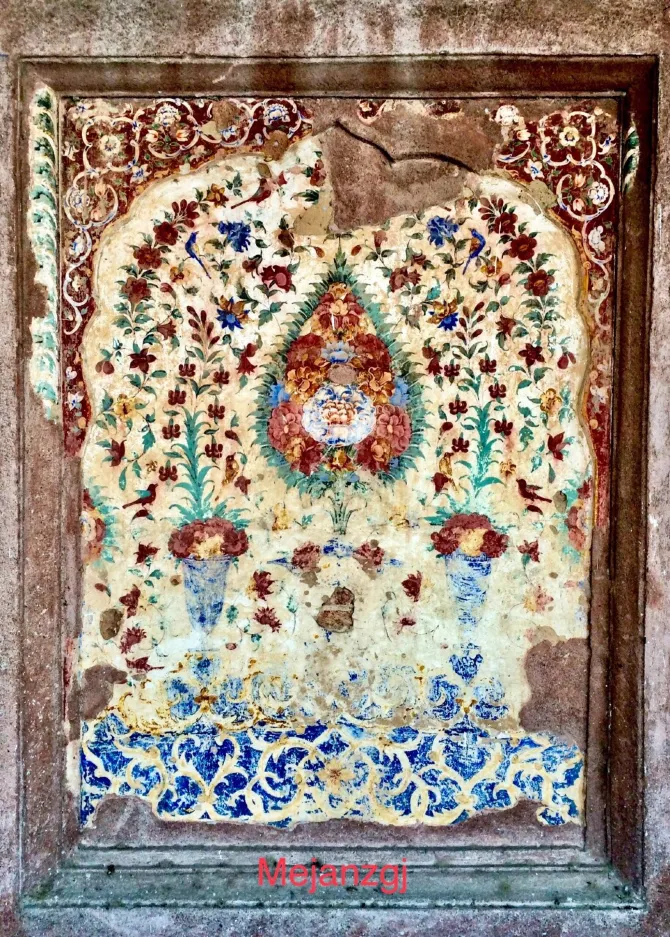
Damaged, dilapidated, and dirtied fresco showing floral motifs

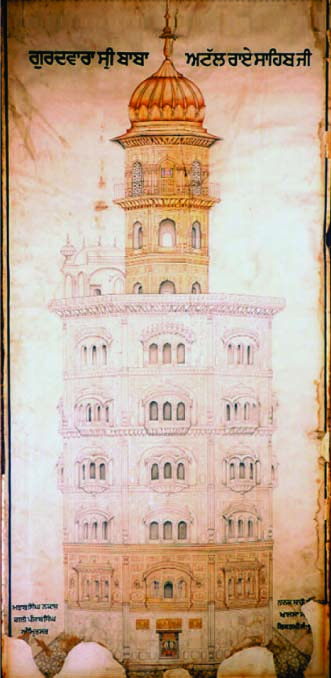
Artwork depicting the tower complex of Gurdwara Baba Atal in Amritsar

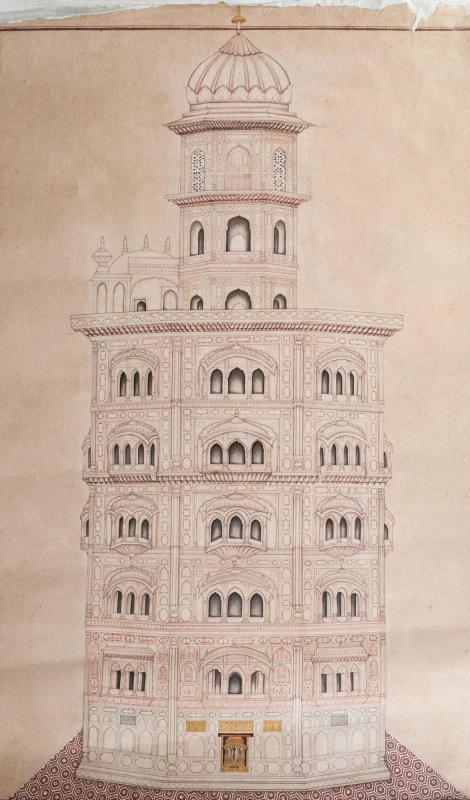
Architectural drawing of the tower complex of Gurdwara Baba Atal in Amritsar, ca.1900's

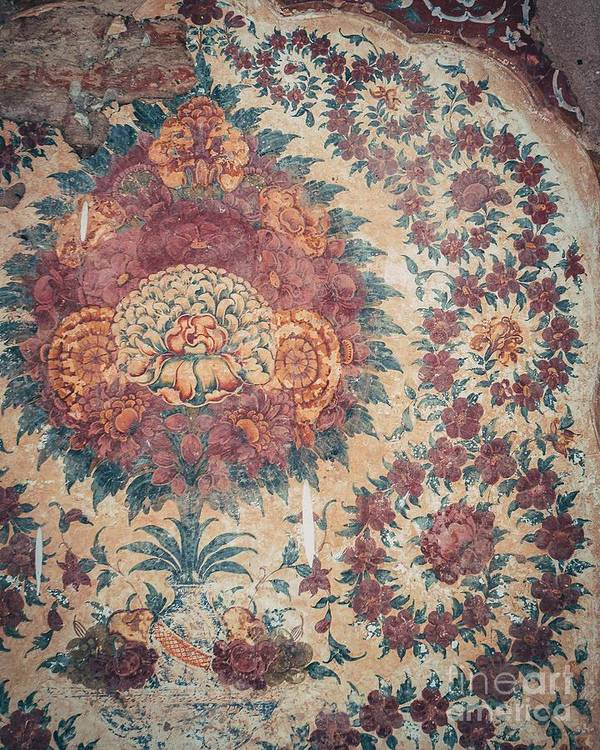
Mural featuring floral motifs from Gurdwara Baba Atal Rai in Amritsar
