= Paroksha =

In Indian philosophy, Paroksha refers to mediate knowledge or indirect cognition, mediated by sensory-intellectual apparatus, in which thought systems psychological insights that have evolved in the context of two levels of realities, empirical and transcendental, are gained through both direct cognition and indirect cognition of things that exist in the universe.

== Etymology ==
This Sanskrit expression made up of two words – Para (beyond) and Aksha (eye), literally means beyond the eye i.e. beyond the range of sight. Therefore, it also means invisible, remote, hidden or mysterious. The Aitareya Brahmana VII.30 gives its meaning as "mysterious" and "mystery" – "tan nayogrohan santan nyogrodhan ity achakshate parokshena, paroksha-priya iva hi deva" (The nyogodha is called nyogrodha after the mysterious (etymology) for the gods like mystery.)

== Understanding some schools ==
=== Caravakas ===
The Caravaka school of thought which does not believe in causation and its universality, advocating naïve realism and empiricism rejects inference as a means of valid knowledge because it depends upon vyapti i.e. the universal concomitance between the middle term and the major term, and because one vyapti is based on another vyapti thus involving an infinite argument. According to this school vyapti can only be known through perception of perceptible things alone and therefore, perception is the only means of valid knowledge. This school does not consider imperceptible things to exist.

=== Buddhism ===
Gautama Buddha is believed to have directed all monks and scholars to thoroughly analyze his words and not adopt them for the sake of respect. He taught rationalism and trust in one's own reasoning and belief, and spoke about the distinction between the mere reception of truth and the knowledge of truth which involves rational conviction. The later Buddhist thinkers such as the Sautrantikas, opposed to the Yogacaras who deny the reality of external objects reducing them to cognitions, advocating indirect realism recognized the reality of external objects which produced their own cognitions and imprinted their forms on them as being basically perceptible; they developed the doctrine of impermanence into the ontological doctrine of momentariness Dharmakirti considered the so-called external objects as mere sensations, that all object-cognitions are due to the revival of the sub-conscious impressions deposited in the mind which are not excited by external objects. The Madhyamakas regard external objects and subjective cognitions to be equally essenceless with Sunya as their eternal basis and reject the plurality of external objects and internal cognitions because of their relativity. Buddha’s teachings lend support to the three valid cognizers which are the three consciousnesses that comprehend the manifest (visible phenomena), the slightly hidden phenomena or kimchid-paroksha (which can be inferred) and the very hidden phenomena or atyartha-paroksha (which is known through the power of belief).

=== Jainism ===
The followers of the Jain School of Thought consider knowledge as emanating from the soul to be Pratyaksha (direct cognition) and the knowledge which is inherited from the senses, Paroksha (indirect cognition); paroksha-knowledge is gained with the help of the mind and senses (Mati) or through what is heard or learnt (Shruti). According to this school Mediate knowledge (Paroksha), which is Valid knowledge (Pramana), though indistinct and devoid of perceptual vividness, is of five kinds – Recollection that determines the real nature of an object perceived in the past, Recognition that knows a present perceived object as known in the past, Induction which is knowledge of the past invariable vyapti arising from the observation of their co-presence and co-absence, Deduction or Inference (anumana) which is based on vyapti derived induction and Testimony is the knowledge of objects derived from words of reliable persons, which are all secondary sources that involve conceptualization of the object of knowledge by means of rational or analytical thought processes. Thus, Paroksha is second-hand knowledge.

=== Hinduism ===
==== Advaita ====
According to the Advaita school Paroksha consists in the intellectual assent to a stated proposition and Aparoksha consists in the actual realization of that proposition. In Paroksha there is the distinction between the subjective concept and the objective reality which that concept represents in consciousness but which distinction is irrelevant in the case of Aparoksha knowledge. A man is said to attain paroksha (indirect) wisdom when he knows (theoretically) that Brahman exists; but he is said to attain sakshatkara (direct cognition) when he knows (or realises) that he is himself Brahman. Then, he becomes Jivanmukta. Vedanta conveys the aparoksha Absolute in a paroksha way which is a valid way because while referring to certain facts about Brahman paroksha does not refer to unrealities. In Srimad-Bhagavatam (XI.xxi.35) it refers to the indirect (proksha) statements of the rishis. The rishis of the Vedas are found to speak variously about Brahman in an indirect manner (proksha-vada) e.g. "The eye, O Emperor, is the Supreme Brahman" or "This being who is in the right eye is named Indha. Though he is Indha , he is indirectly called Indra, for the gods have a fondness, as it were, for indirect names, and hate to be called indirectly". Thus, paroksha is "This", and aparoksha is "That" of the Upanishads. Paroksha wisdom or mediate knowledge, which is right perception, does not liberate a person from Saṃsāra but it is confirmed by Aparoksha wisdom. The paroksha-vada (indirect injunctions) of the Vedic rishis indirectly leads one to the path of liberation Srimad-Bhagavatam (XI.iii.44).

In the Bhagavad Gita XIII.12-13, Krishna tells Arjuna about that which is to be known, and also about that by realizing which one attains immortality. This is paroksha wisdom by which the attention of the listener is aroused and the fruit of such knowledge is indicated viz - the knowledge of the knowable beginningless attributeless Brahman gaining which one gains the aparoksha wisdom, the knowledge of the Knower of the field, Brahman who exists but transcends all verbal expressions, who cannot be expressed in terms like existence and non-existence.

Shankara explains that Krishna objectifies the acosmic through the process of superimposition and sublation by designating Brahman as the field-knower by employing the adjunct, field, variously pluralised due to hands, feet, etc. Brahman is to be realised as existing. And, Badarayana (Brahma Sutras III.ii.15) states that like light, the non-dual formless Brahman in connection with Upadhis (limiting adjuncts) appears to have a form.
