= Aparoksha =

- Samkhya: Kapila
- Yoga: Patanjali
- Vaisheshika: Kaṇāda, Prashastapada
- Secular: Valluvar

Aparoksha (Sanskrit: अपरोक्ष), a Sanskrit adjective meaning not invisible or perceptible, refers to direct intuitive knowledge which is one of the seven stages of knowledge or conditions of Chidabhasa, the first three being the sources of bondage and the rest four being the processes of liberation; and to the continuation of the deepening of conventional knowledge. It removes sorrows. According to Indian philosophy, the three traditional kinds of knowledge are – pratyaksha (empirical), paroksha (conventional, universal) and aparoksha (transcendental). Aparoksha is the highest kind of knowledge which cannot be gained without the practice of morality that converts paroksha knowledge from which unity of existence is derived. This knowledge is gained by establishing a guru-shishya sambandha (Guru-shishya tradition) with a teacher who has already experienced that kind of knowledge (Aparoksanubhuti); the karma or acts required to be done, after gain of Aparoksha jnana is Vidya-karma which consists in sravana (hearing of srutis), manana (reflection) and nididhyasana (meditation on Brahman).

Aparoksha is savikalpa jnana (knowledge) when one re-recognizes the non-dual nature of the ever-realized Self (Tat Tvam Asi), it is the immediate knowledge gained through the pramanas; practice of Dhyana (meditation) removes all vikalpas (varied thoughts) and leads to nirvikalpa or the thoughtless state, which is the highest experience, the immediate realization of Truth. It is the method of cessation from individual and collective perception leading to the position of neutrality. Sarvam khalvidam Brahman (all this is Brahman) is paroksha knowledge, but the understanding that Aham Brahman Asmi (I am Brahman) is aparoksha knowledge.
