= Sodhi =

Khatri & Jat Clan in India and Pakistan

Regions with significant populations
- India

Languages
- Punjabi, Hindi

Religion
- Hinduism, Sikhism

Related ethnic groups
- Khatri, Jat

Sodhi is a Khatri and Jat (gotra) clan found in Punjab. The fourth to tenth Sikh Gurus, from Guru Ram Das to Guru Gobind Singh, were all from the Sodhi clan of Khatris.

== History ==
According to a legend, some of the descendants migrated to Sanaudh where the clan chieftain married the daughter of the king and had a son named Sodhi Rai whose descendants ruled over the Sanaudh region now known as east and west Punjab and Haryana and some parts of Himachal Pradesh in northern India.

The Sodhis of Anandpur held revenue-free lands in Anandpur Sahib and various other parts of Punjab. They were the ruling family of Anandpur Sahib.

At the time of the Sikh Empire, Maharaja Ranjit Singh awarded revenue-free grants to Sodhis, who were not strictly associated with any particular religion and usually "maintained a considerable number of horsemen". Sodhis are also a Jat (gotra) clan, associated with agricultural and landowning. Towards the end of Maharaj Ranjit Singh's reign, the total worth of their jagirs (fiefs) was ₹500,000 a year. Ranjit Singh lavishly patronised a descendant of Dhir Mahal, Sodhi Sadhu Singh, with a gift of several villages. The original copy of the foundational Sikh scripture Adi Granth, also known as the Kartarpuri Bir, is reported to be in the possession of the descendants of Sodhi Sadhu Singh at Kartarpur.

== Notable people ==
=== Historical figures ===
- Guru Ram Das (born Jetha Mal Sodhi, 1534–1581), Punjabi saint and fourth Sikh Guru
- Prithi Chand (1558–1618), Punjabi saint and founder of the Mina sect, oldest son of Guru Ram Das
- Guru Arjan (1563–1606), Punjabi saint and fifth Sikh Guru, youngest son of Guru Ram Das
- Guru Hargobind (1595–1644), Punjabi saint and sixth Sikh Guru, son of Guru Arjan
- Baba Gurditta (born Gurditta Sodhi, 1613–1638), Punjabi Udasi saint and the oldest son of Guru Hargobind
- Sodhi Suraj Mal (1617–1645), son of Guru Hargobind
- Dhir Mal (1627–1677), Punjabi saint, son of Baba Gurditta and grandson of Guru Hargobind
- Guru Har Rai (1630–1661), Punjabi saint and seventh Sikh Guru
- Ram Rai (1645–1687), Punjabi saint and founder of the Ramraiya sect, oldest son of Guru Har Rai
- Rup Kaur (1650s–1705), Sikh author and daughter of Guru Har Rai
- Guru Har Krishan (born Kishan Das Sodhi, 1656–1664), Punjabi saint and eighth Sikh Guru, youngest son of Guru Har Rai
- Guru Tegh Bahadur (born Tyag Mal Sodhi, 1621–1675), Punjabi saint and ninth Sikh Guru, second youngest son of Guru Hargobind
- Guru Gobind Singh (born Gobind Das Sodhi, 1666–1708), Punjabi saint, the tenth and last Sikh Guru, son of Guru Tegh Bahadur
- Ajit Singh (1687–1704), Sikh martyr and the first son of Guru Gobind Singh
- Jujhar Singh (1691–1704), Sikh martyr and the second son of Guru Gobind Singh
- Zorawar Singh (1696–1704), Sikh martyr and the third son of Guru Gobind Singh
- Fateh Singh (1699–1704), Sikh martyr and the fourth son of Guru Gobind Singh
- Baba Darbara Singh (1644–1734), Sikh religious and military leader, claimed descendant of Guru Hargobind
- Vadbhag Singh Sodhi (1716–1761), Sikh general and religious figure

=== Modern people ===
- Amandeep Sodhi (born 2001), Canadian politician
- Ashok Sodhi (1963–2008), Indian photojournalist
- Daya Singh Sodhi (1925–2011), Indian politician
- Dolly Guleria (born Rupinder Kaur Sodhi in 1949), Indian Punjabi singer
- Harbans Singh (1921–1998), Indian Sikh scholar, educator and historian
- Harvinder Sodhi (born 1971), Indian cricketer
- H. S. Sodhi (1938–2024), Indian colonel, polo and equestrian sportsman
- Ish Sodhi (born 1992), New Zealand cricketer
- Ishmeet Singh Sodhi (1988–2008), Indian singer
- Manku Ram Sodhi (1934–2017), Indian politician
- Manreet Sodhi Someshwar, Indian author
- Mansher Singh (born 1965), Indian sport shooter
- Nauvdip Kumar Sodhi (1943–2021), Indian judge
- Nikky-Guninder Kaur Singh, Indian-American religious scholar
- Prakash Kaur (1919–1982), Indian Punjabi singer
- Rana Gurmit Singh Sodhi (born 1954), Indian politician
- Reetinder Singh Sodhi (born 1980), Indian cricketer
- Ronjan Sodhi (born 1979), Indian sport shooter
- R. S. Sodhi (born 1940s), Indian colonel and polo player
- Shellee (real name Shailender Singh Sodhi), Indian poet, lyricist and writer
- Shruti Sodhi (born 1988), Indian actress
- Sukhman Sodhi (stage name Sukha, born 2003), Canadian Punjabi rapper and singer-songwriter
- Surinder Kaur (1929–2006), Indian Punjabi singer
- Surinder Singh Sodhi (born 1957), Indian field hockey player
- Surinder Singh Sodhi (1962–1984), Sikh militant and terrorist
- Surinder Sodhi, Indian film composer
- Tania Sodhi, Canadian politician

== Gallery ==
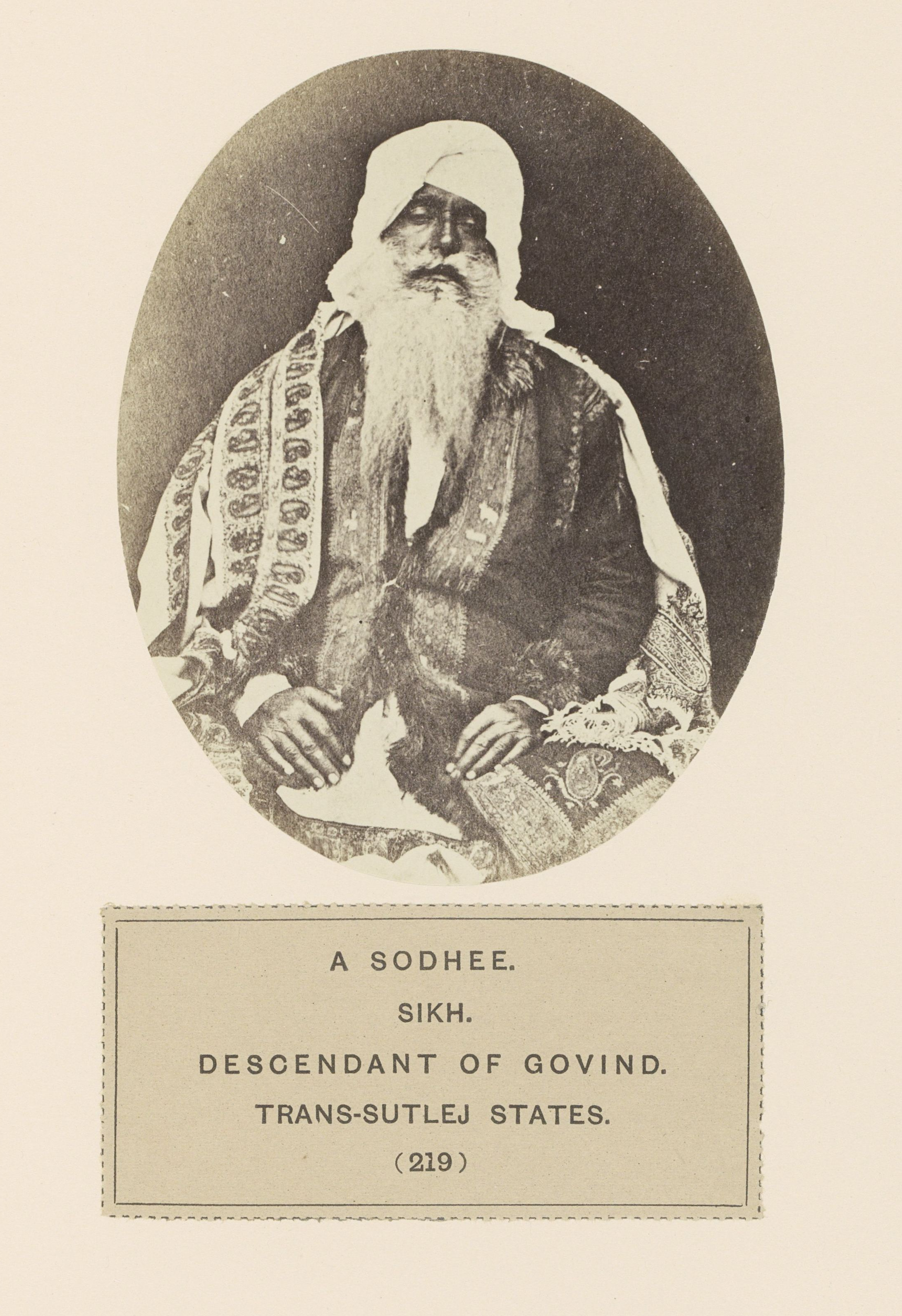
An unknown Sodhi from present-day Himachal Pradesh

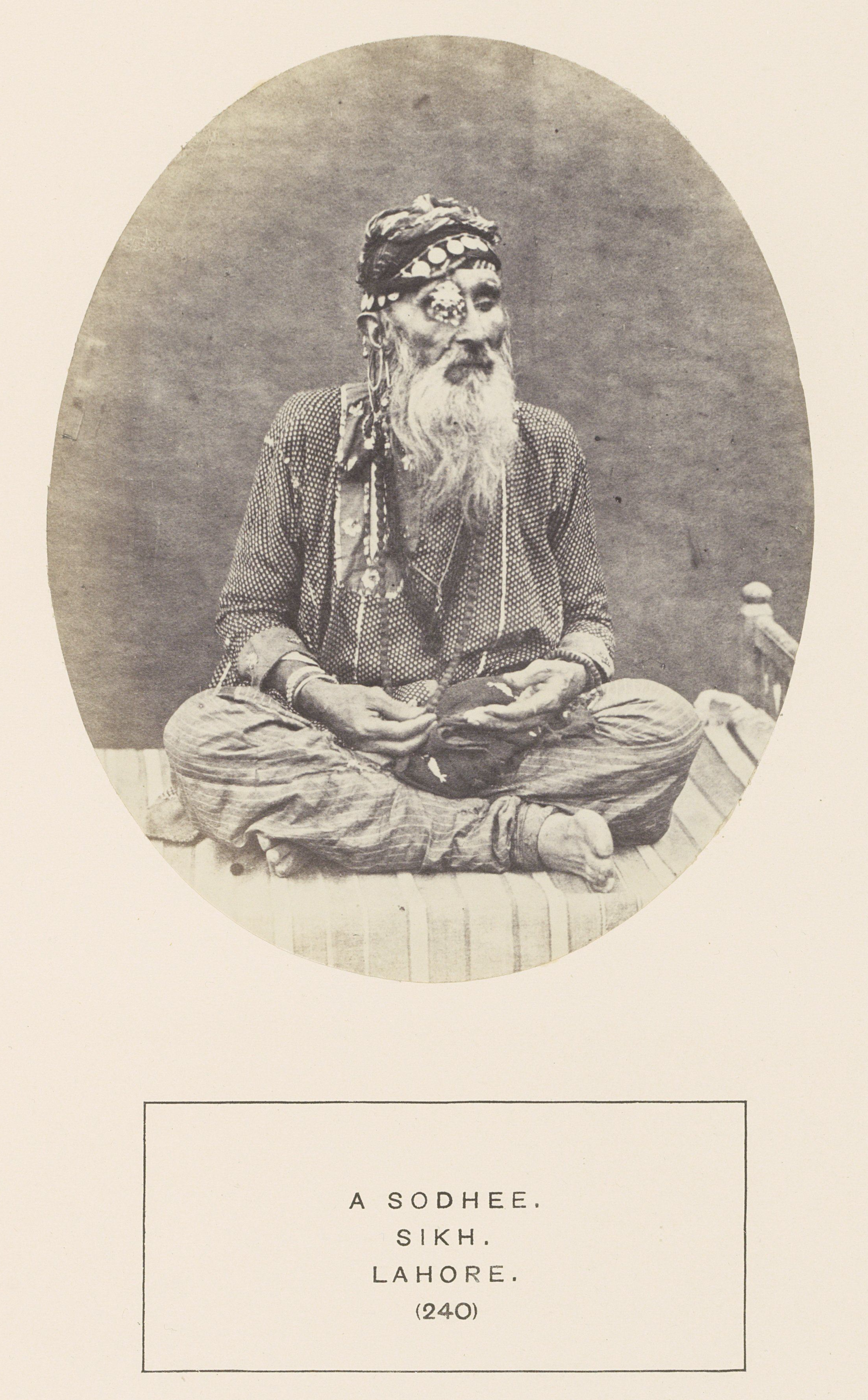
An unknown Sodhi from Lahore

== See also ==
- Sood (disambiguation)
- Sodha, Rajput clan of Sindh, Pakistan
- Sodhian, village in Punjab, India
- Sodhi Bala, village in Khushab District, Pakistan
- Sodhi Village, village in Uttar Pradesh, India
- Sud (disambiguation)
- Murder of Balbir Singh Sodhi, 2001 murder in the USA
