= Mata Nihal Kaur =

Mother of Guru Har Rai

Mata Nihal

Personal life
- Born: Ananti
- Died: 29 September 1644 Kiratpur, Punjab
- Spouse: Baba Gurditta
- Children: Dhir Mal; Guru Har Rai
- Parents: Bhai Rama (father); Sukhdevi (mother)

Religious life
- Religion: Sikhism

Mata Nihal (died 29 September 1644), popularly known as Mata Natti, also known as Ananti, Nihalo, and Bassi, was the wife of Baba Gurditta. She was the mother of Guru Har Rai and Dhir Mal.

== Biography ==
She was the daughter of father Bhai Rama and mother Sukhdevi, both of whom were Khatri Sikhs from the locality of Batala located in present-day Gurdaspur district. She was wed to Baba Gurditta on 17 April 1624. Nihal Kaur was the daughter-in-law of the sixth Sikh Guru, Guru Hargobind. She bore two sons, Dhir Mal (born 11 January 1627) and the seventh Sikh Guru, Guru Har Rai (born 18 January 1630).

When Guru Hargobind passed and Mata Nanaki relocated to Bakala in 1644, Nihal Kaur was the head of the Guru's household during the Guruship periods of Har Rai and Har Krishan.

She was responsible for the upbringing of the seventh Guru and infused the spiritual values of the House of Guru Nanak, the founder of Sikhism. She taught the young Guru-to-be the value of compassion, love, kindness, bravery, humility, etc. as was the case with all the mothers of the Gurus.

On the occasion of the wedding of her grand-daughter, Rup Kaur, Mata Bassi presented Rup Kaur with five gifts, namely Guru Nanak's seli and topi, Guru Hargobind's katar weapon, a pothi associated with a Sikh guru (Guru Sahib diyan Sakhian di pothi), and a rehal (where the pothi's prakash was undertaken).

She died in Kiratpur on 29 September 1644.
