= Sood =

Sood may refer to:

- Sood, Arunachal Pradesh, an Indian village
- Sood-Oberleimbach railway station, railway station in Switzerland
- Sood (surname), Indian surname

== See also ==
- Soda
- Soodi
