= Seli-topi =

Traditional attire

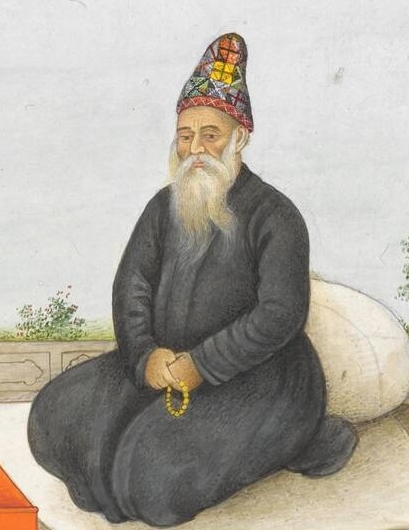
Detail of a Nanakpanthi wearing a seli-topi, from the 'Tashrih al-aqvam' of James Skinner, ca.1825

A seli-topi is a traditional garment from Punjab. The word seli refers to a skein of twisted, woolen thread and a topi is a head-cap. According to Bhagat Bedi, the seli was a black-string that was sometimes worn on the topi (hat) or on the neck (chhara) in a manner akin to a necklace or gatra. The seli had five tassels attached to it.

== History ==
=== Hinduism ===
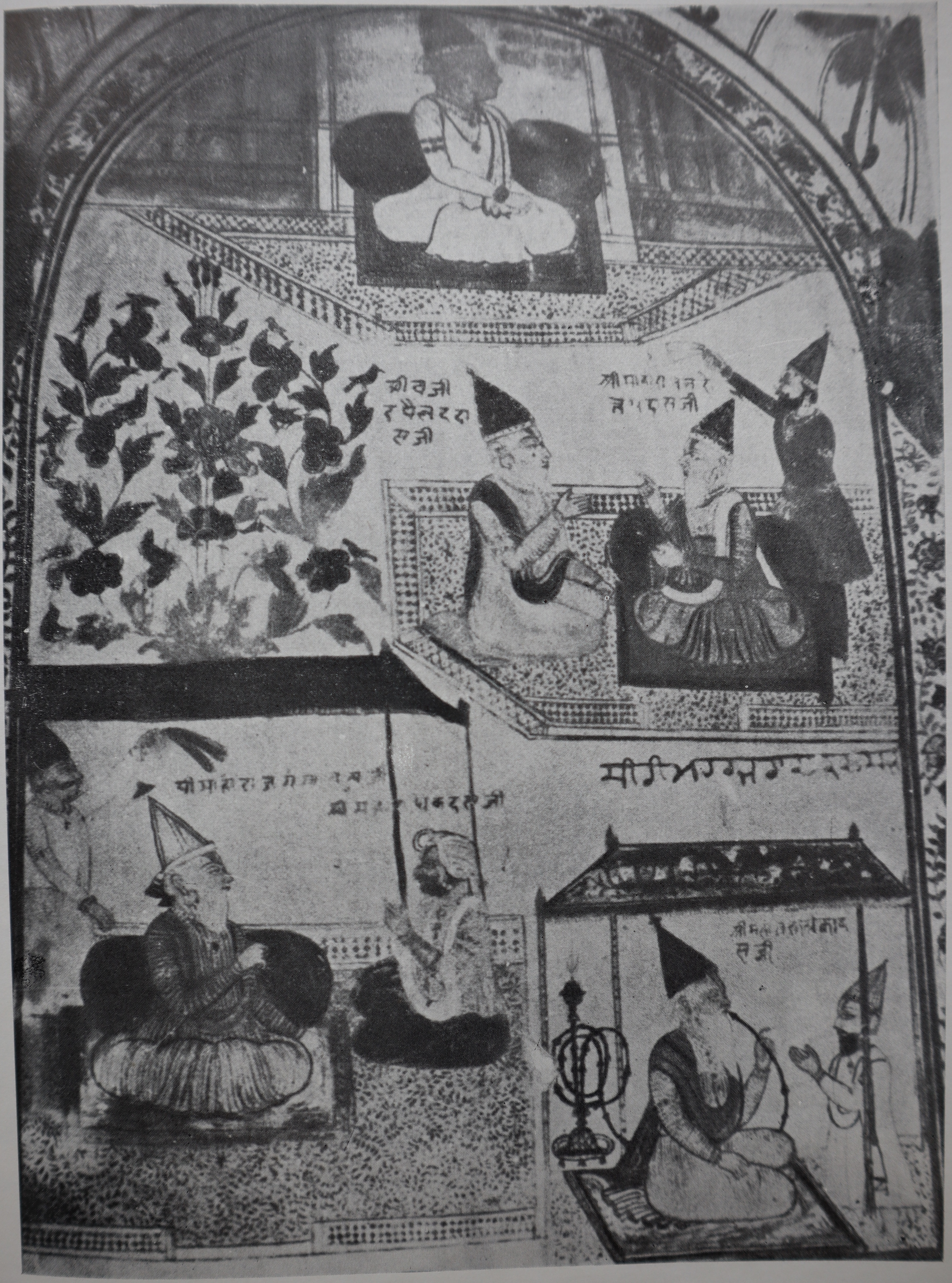
Mural depicting mahants of Pindori Dham wearing seli-topi

The seli and topi play a role in the succession ceremony for the Vaishnavist religious institutions of Pindori and Damtal in Punjab, as a black woolen thread seli and a topi cap are received from the Jogi establishment of Jakhbar to be placed upon the new Mahant of the institutions, considered critically important items for the succession ceremony. The garment can also be found amongst the Kabirpanthis.

=== Sikhism ===
In Sikhism, the garment is associated with the early Sikh gurus and its wearing was continued by the Udasi sect. At Cherisarma, near the Samye monastery, there is a peak-shaped mountain that locals believe to be the seli-topi of Guru Nanak.

According to Jvala Singh, the seli topi was worn by the first five Sikh gurus rather than a turban. It was only during the period of the sixth Sikh guru, Guru Hargobind, that the turban gained prominence amongst the Sikhs. Guru Hargobind tied a turban rather than donning the traditional seli topi of the predecessory gurus. Later, the practice of tying a turban became fully tied to Sikhs with the formalization of the Khalsa order by Guru Gobind Singh in 1699. According to Gurbilas Patshahi Chhevin, Guru Hargobind changed the custom of seli and topi to gatra and dumalla. As per Giani Gian Singh, when Guru Hargobind was given the seli-topi (presented by Baba Buddha during his succession), he remarked that he should be given two-swords instead and that the seli-topi be given to the Bedis instead. Baba Gurditta, son of Guru Hargobind, adorned the seli-topi. A seli and topi in the possession of Baba Gurditta's descendants at Kiratpur is evidence that Sri Chand had passed them to Gurditta, with the guru's permission. It is believed that on the occasion of the wedding Rup Kaur, daughter of Guru Har Rai, Mata Bassi presented Rup Kaur with five gifts, including Guru Nanak's seli and topi.

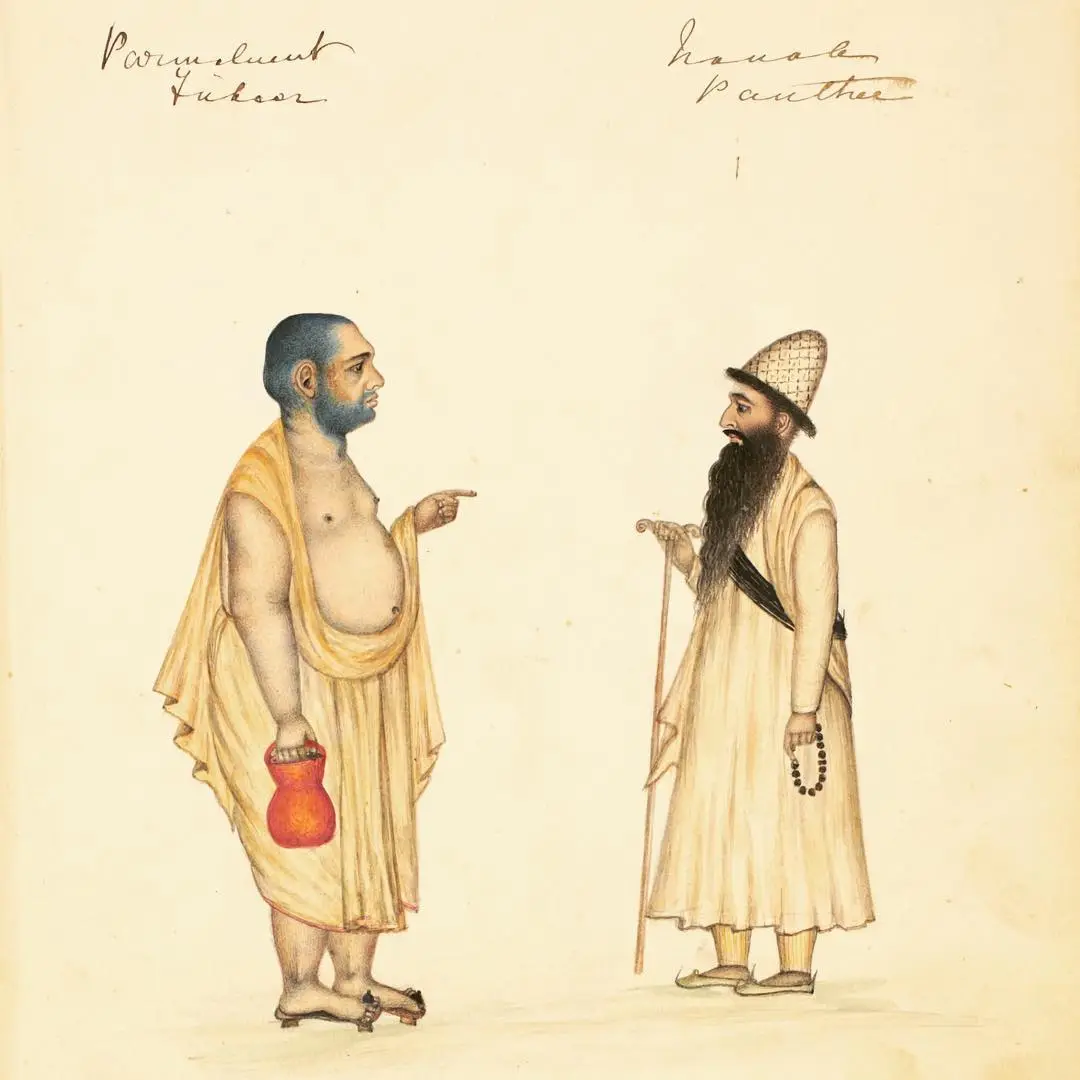
A Nanakpanthi (right) wearing a seli-topi, circa 19th century

According to the Bedi Foundation, it was a custom to pass-on pothi-mala, the seli-topi and padam of Guru Nanak to the next Guru until Guru Ram Das, as Prithi Chand and the Minas stole the possessions. The present custodians of the Pothimala institution in Guru Har Sahai claim to possess the seli-topi, made out of silk but damaged and having a protective outer case sewn to the original. They practice a tradition of the Gaddi Nashin of Pothimala wearing the topi on New Sambat day every year. Another seli-topi claimed to have been worn by the first five Sikh gurus is kept at the fort in Kartarpur, Jalandhar district, Punjab, India.

=== Islam ===
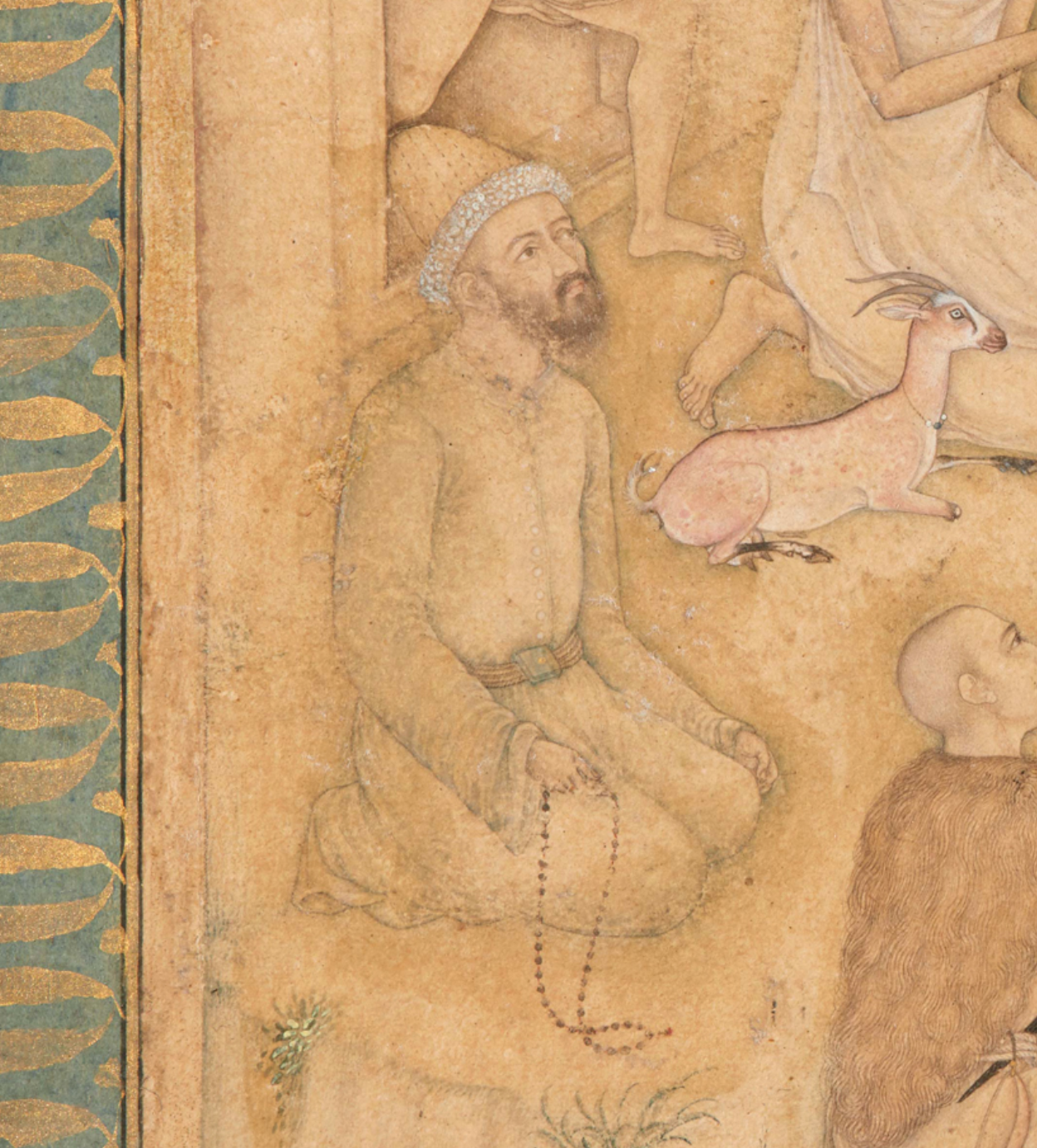
Detail from a painting of a prince visiting holy men, attributed to Manohar, ca.1610.

The attire is worn by Sufis and also by fakirs of the school of Pir Bahaw Din.

== Variations ==
A mukat was a traditional headwear that was shaped like a crown with a small-dome. Guru Nanak is depicted wearing it in some artwork. A kulla is a high-cap worn under a turban. In summer, Udasis wear a cotton cloth cap while in winter they wear a woolen one.

== In artwork ==
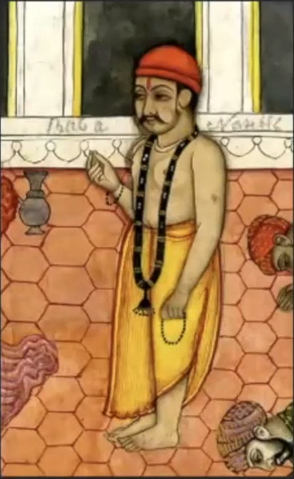
Detail of Guru Nanak from a Janamsakhi painting of Guru Nanak praying at the mosque with the Muslims. North India, circa late 18th century. Nanak can be seen wearing a black seli and an orange topi.

Older, historical artwork of Guru Nanak frequently depicts him wearing a seli-topi. At least three different types of topis have been depicted as being worn by Nanak in historical paintings. Bhagat Singh Bedi has incorporated the seli-topi in his paintings, alongside a tilak and mala (rosary), depicting some Sikh gurus to increase their historical accuracy as opposed to commonplace anachronistic works.

== See also ==
- Sikh chola
- Phrygian cap
- Dastar-bunga
