= Guru Har Rai =

Seventh Sikh guru from 1644 to 1661

- ਗੁਰੂ ਹਰਿ ਰਾਇ
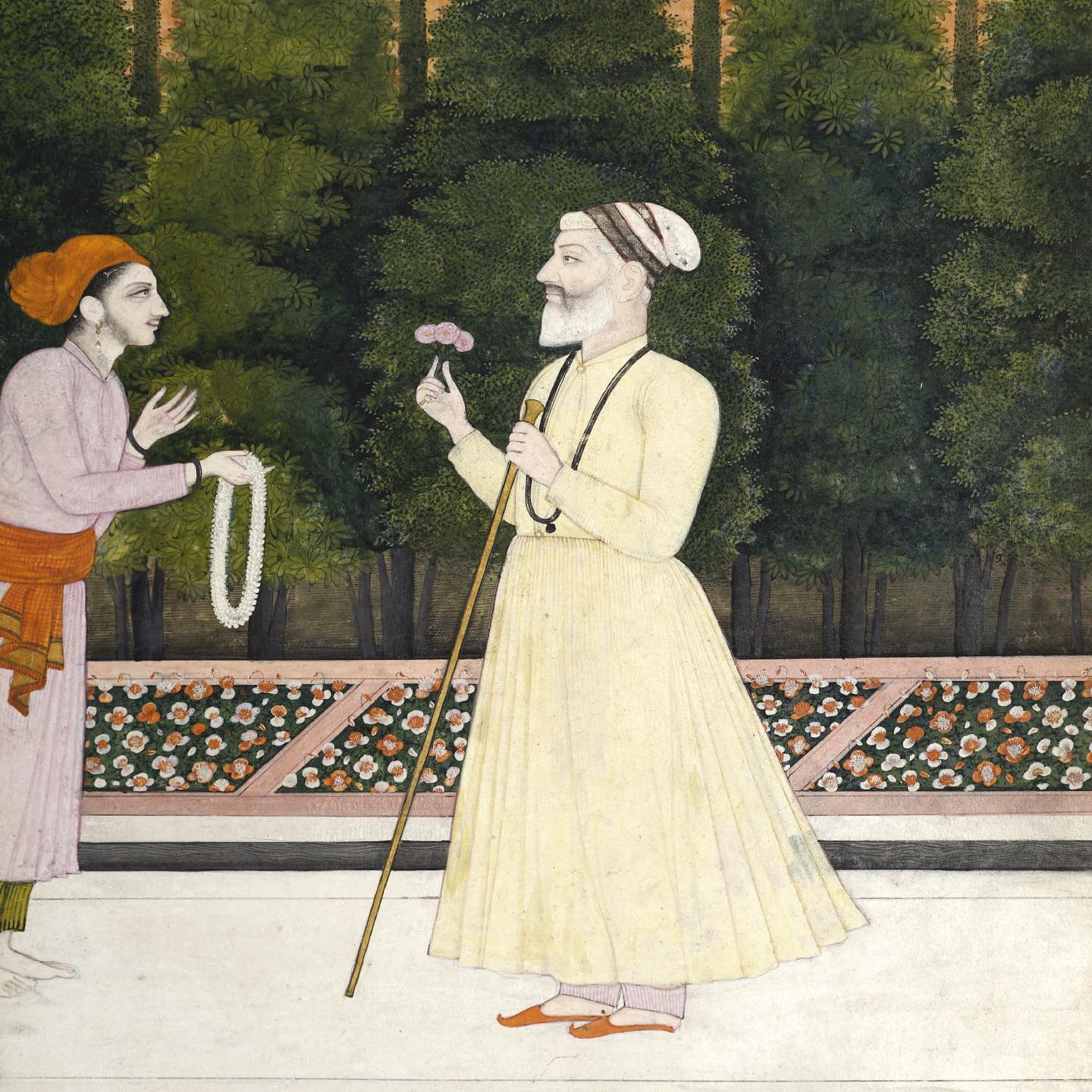
- Guru Har Rai receives a devotee. Family workshop of Nainsukh of Guler, Punjab Hills, ca.1790

Personal life
- Born: 16 January 1630 Kiratpur Sahib, Lahore Subah, Mughal Empire
- Died: 6 October 1661 (aged 31) Kiratpur Sahib, Lahore Subah, Mughal Empire
- Spouse: Mata Krishen Devi (also known as Sulakhni, Kot Kalyani, or Kishan Kaur)
- Children: Baba Ram Rai; Roop Kaur; Guru Har Krishan
- Parent(s): Baba Gurditta (father); Mata Nihal Kaur (mother); Baba Daya Ram (father in law); Mata Ananti (mother in law)
- Other names: Seventh Master; Seventh Nanak
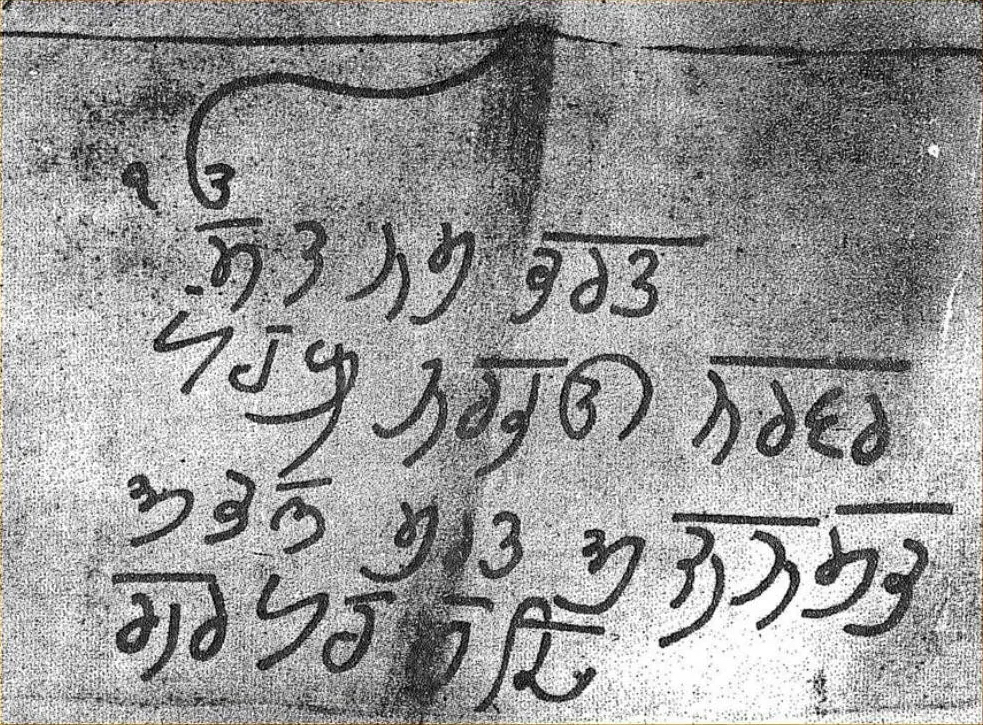
- Signature

Religious life
- Religion: Sikhism

Religious career
- Based in: Kiratpur Sahib (1644–1661)
- Period in office: 1644–1661
- Predecessor: Guru Hargobind
- Successor: Guru Har Krishan

Military service
- Battles/wars: Wars: Fighting the following battles: Battle of Satluj, 1652; Invasion to Kiratpur, 1658

Guru Har Rai (Gurmukhi: ਗੁਰੂ ਹਰਿ ਰਾਇ, pronunciation: [gʊɾuː ɦəɾ ɾaːɪ]; 16 January 1630 – 6 October 1661) revered as the seventh Nanak, was the seventh of ten Gurus of the Sikh religion. He became the Sikh leader at age 14, on 3 March 1644, after the death of his grandfather and the sixth Sikh leader Guru Hargobind. He guided the Sikhs for about seventeen years, till his death at age 31.

Guru Har Rai is notable for maintaining the large army of Sikh soldiers that the sixth Sikh Guru had amassed, yet avoiding military conflict. He supported the moderate Sufi influenced Dara Shikoh instead of conservative Sunni influenced Aurangzeb as the two brothers entered into a war of succession to the Mughal Empire throne.

After Aurangzeb won the succession war in 1658, he summoned Guru Har Rai in 1660 to explain his support for the executed Dara Shikoh. Guru Har Rai sent his elder son Ram Rai to represent him. Aurangzeb kept Ram Rai as hostage, questioned Ram Rai about a verse in the Adi Granth – the holy text of Sikhs at that time. Aurangzeb claimed that it disparaged the Muslims. Ram Rai changed the verse to appease Aurangzeb instead of standing by the Sikh scripture, an act for which Guru Har Rai is remembered for excommunicating his elder son, and nominating his younger son Har Krishan to succeed him. Har Krishan became the eighth Guru at age five after Guru Har Rai's death in 1661.

== Names ==
Some Sikh literature spell his name as Hari Rai. Some modern Sikhs refer to him as the Green Guru due to the sensitivity he displayed to the natural world.

== Biography ==
Guru Har Rai was born to Ananti (also known as Nihal) and Baba Gurditta into a Sodhi Khatri household. His father died when he was 8 years old. At age 10, in 1640, Guru Har Rai was married to Mata Kishan Devi (sometimes also referred to as Sulakhni) the daughter of Daya Ram. They had one daughter Rup Kaur and two sons, Ram Rai and Har Krishan (the latter of whom became the eighth Guru). Shortly after his succession to guruship, the Mughals under the command of Najabat Khan invaded the territory of Tara Chand of Hindur, capturing the ruler himself. Thus, Har Rai left Kiratpur and travelled to Thapal in Sirmur (Nahan, ruled by Raja Karam Prakash) to give his first teaching, in the form of a vak (commandment). This account of the guru travelling to Thapal can be found both in the Dabestan-e Mazaheb and it is also recorded in a note within Jograj's Ād Granth manuscript. Guru Hargobind had advised to not get involved in military conflict with the Mughals and rather focus on religious teaching, therefore Guru Har Rai did not interfere in the conflict between Hindur and the Mughals.

Guru Har Rai had a brother. His elder brother Dhir Mal had gained encouragement and support from Shah Jahan, with free land grants and Mughal sponsorship. Dhir Mal attempted to form a parallel Sikh tradition and criticized his grandfather and sixth Guru, Hargobind. The sixth Guru disagreed with Dhir Mal, and designated the younger Har Rai as the successor.

Authentic literature about Guru Har Rai life and times are scarce, he left no texts of his own and some Sikh texts composed later spell his name as "Hari Rai". Some of the biographies of Guru Har Rai written in the 18th century such as by Kesar Singh Chhibber, and the 19th-century Sikh literature are highly inconsistent.

=== Dara Shikoh ===
Guru Har Rai provided medical care to Dara Shikoh, possibly when he had been poisoned by Mughal operatives. According to Mughal records, Guru Har Rai provided other forms of support to Dara Shikoh as he and his brother Aurangzeb battled for rights to succession. Ultimately, Aurangzeb won, arrested Dara Shikoh and executed him on charges of apostasy from Islam. In 1660, Aurangzeb summoned Guru Har Rai to appear before him to explain his relationship with Dara Shikoh.

In the Sikh tradition, Guru Har Rai was asked why he was helping the Mughal prince Dara Shikoh whose forefathers had persecuted Sikhs and Sikh Gurus. Guru Har Rai is believed to have replied that if a man plucks flowers with one hand and gives it away using his other hand, both hands get the same fragrance.

After Aurangzeb won the succession war in 1658, he summoned Guru Har Rai in 1660 to explain his support for the executed Dara Shikoh. Guru Har Rai sent his elder son Ram Rai to represent him. Aurangzeb kept the 13 year old Ram Rai as hostage, questioned Ram Rai about a verse in the Adi Granth – the holy text of Sikhs. Aurangzeb claimed that it disparaged the Muslims. Ram Rai changed the meanings of the verse to appease Aurangzeb instead of standing by the Sikh scripture, an act for which Guru Har Rai excommunicated his elder son, and nominated the younger Har Krishan to succeed as the next Guru of Sikhism.

=== Influence ===
He started several public singing and scripture recital traditions in Sikhism. The katha or discourse style recitals were added by Guru Har Rai to the sabad kirtan singing tradition of Sikhs. He also added the akhand kirtan or continuous scripture singing tradition of Sikhism, as well as the tradition of jotian da kirtan or collective folk choral singing of scriptures.

==== Reforms ====
The third Sikh leader Guru Amar Das had started the tradition of appointing Manji (zones of religious administration with an appointed chief called sangatias), introduced the dasvandh ("the tenth" of income) system of revenue collection in the name of Guru and as pooled community religious resource, and the famed langar tradition of Sikhism where anyone, without discrimination of any kind, could get a free meal in a communal seating.

The organisational structure that had helped Sikhs to grow and resist the Mughal persecution had created new problems for Guru Har Rai. The donation collectors, some of the Masands (local congregational leaders) led by Dhir Mal – the older brother of Guru Har Rai, all of them encouraged by the support of Shah Jahan, land grants and Mughal administration – had attempted to internally split the Sikhs into competing movements, start a parallel guruship, and thereby weaken the Sikh religion. Thus a part of the challenge for Guru Har Rai was to keep Sikhs united.

He appointed new masands such as Bhai Jodh, Bhai Gonda, Bhai Nattha, Bhagat Bhagwan (for eastern India), Bhai Pheru (for Rajathan), Bhai Bhagat (also known as Bairagi), as the heads of Manjis.

=== Death and succession ===
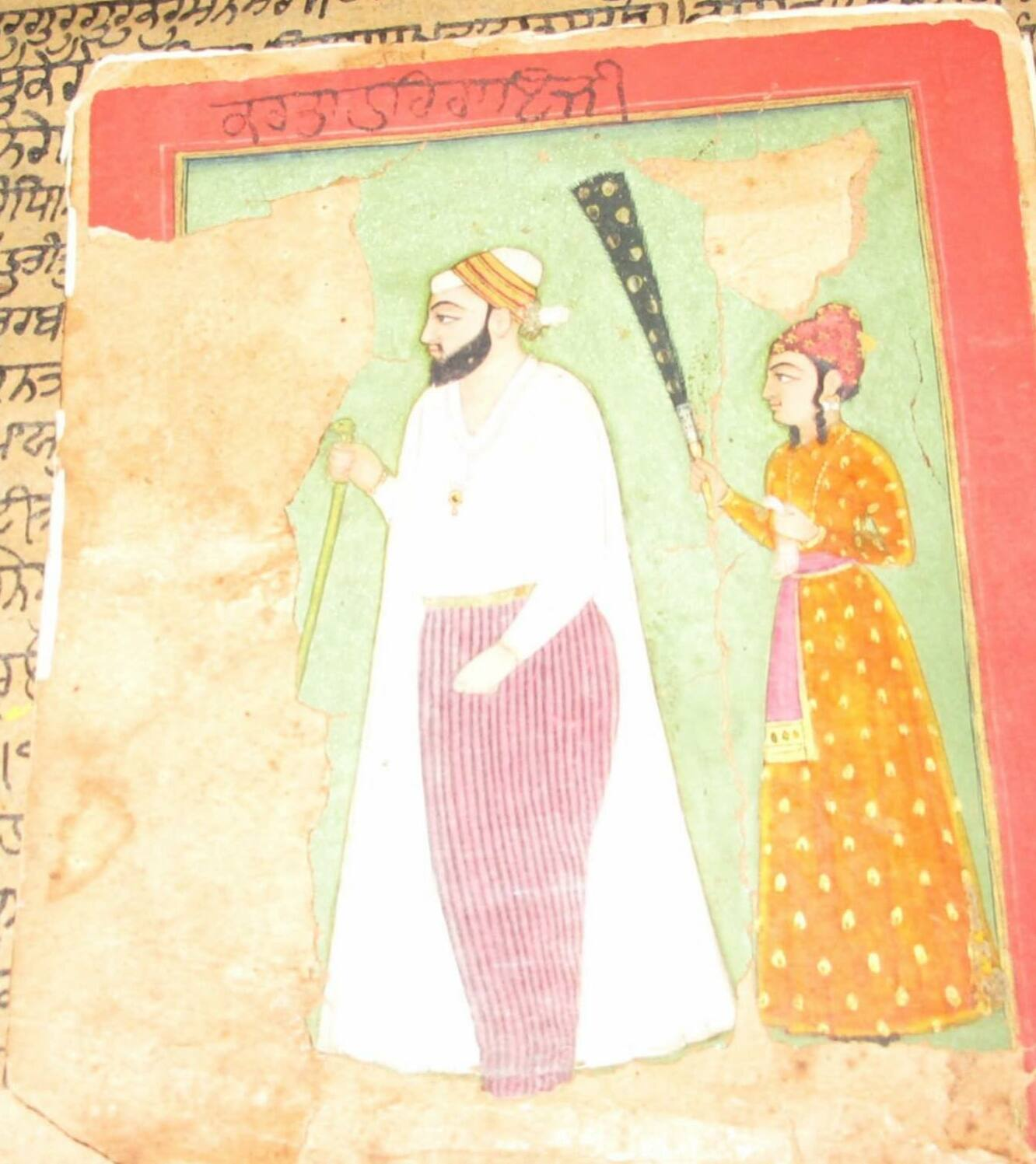
Miniature depicting Guru Har Rai with Guru Har Krishan as the fly-whisk attendant, kept within the Kartarpur Bir

He appointed his 5-year-old youngest son Har Krishan as the eighth Guru of the Sikhs before his death.

== Environmental stewardship ==
Guru Har Rai is associated in the Sikh tradition for his interest in the natural world. Guru Har Rai taught that the environment should be cared for by Sikhs.

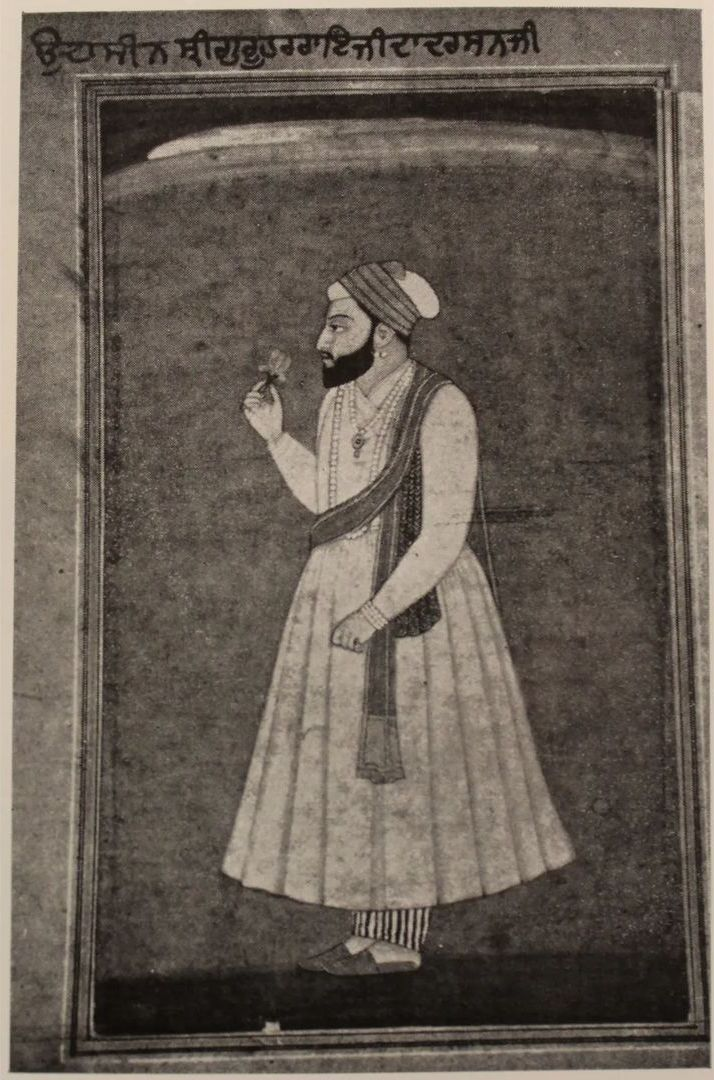
Miniature painting of Guru Har Rai holding a flower, circa 1685. Kept in the collection of the mahant of the Ram Rai Darbar complex in Dehradun, Uttarakhand, India.

According to a traditional sakhi (with there existing variations of the same tale), when Guru Har Rai was a youth, he was strolling in a garden when the cloak of his garb happened to break a flower off of its stem after coming into contact with it. After seeing what had happened, he felt a strong sense of remorse for what had occurred, leading him to carefully ensuring his clothing does not harm any other plants for the rest of his life by being cautious through gathering his clothing while walking. This story depicts the Guru's sensitivity to harm of flora.

Guru Har Rai is said to have participated in hunting much like the previous gurus. However in-contrast to his predecessors, he never actually killed the animals he hunted but rather kept them in a zoo located in Kiratpur.

=== Medicinal knowledge ===
A traditional Sikh garden located in Kiratpur, known as Naulakha Bagh (meaning "garden of 900,000 plants"), was believed to have been founded and cared for by Guru Har Rai during his guruship period. It was large and contained many medicinal species of plants. One story narrates that Dara Shikoh was close to death after having been poisoned by tiger whiskers, as per tradition, and the treatments offered by his father, Shah Jahan, failed to absolve his illness. After trying every treatment with no resolve, Shah Jahan eventually made contact with Guru Har Rai for his assistance, with the latter freely offering it to the Mughal prince. Guru Har Rai sent medicinal plants to Shah Jahan to treat his son's condition. Despite the hostility that existed at that time between the Mughal emperor Shah Jahan and the Sikhs, the Sikh guru still helped the emperor's poisoned son, which is a reflection of Guru Har Rai's far-reaching compassion.

== Marriage ==
It is commonly accepted that Guru Har Rai married a woman named Sulakhani. Claims that he had multiple marriages and practised polygamy, with the number of wives ranging from seven to eight, namely Sulakhani or Kishan Kaur, Kalyani, Toki, Anokhi, Ladiki, Chand Kaur, Prem Kaur, and Ram Kaur, have been rejected by later historians as unreliable. Historian Ganda Singh stated that the story of Guru Har Rai marrying seven wives “is found only in one MS of Suraj Prakash, and is written on unpaged leaves which are clearly an interpolation”. He further noted that other manuscripts of the Suraj Prakash mention only one marriage and that the older Mahima Prakash likewise records only one wife for Guru Har Rai. The Bhatt Vahis, the Panda Vahis of Haridwar, and the writings of Kavi Saundh also mention only Kishan Kaur or Sulakhani as the sole wife of Guru Har Rai. The claim he had more than one wife originate from dubious Gurparnali sources.

== Literature ==
The common Sikh belief is that Guru Hargobind, Guru Har Rai and Guru Harkrishan did not contribute to any Bani at all. However, it is claimed that Guru Har Rai is said to have written a composition known as the Salok Mahalla Satvaan. This mahalla composition is in the Kiratpuri Bir of the Guru Granth Sahib. Although it is clearly marked as a composition of Guru Har Rai the seventh Mina Guru Miharban also used the marker leaving open the possibility of mistaken attribution. The Salok does not appear in any of the texts containing the writings of Miharban. At the same time no text about the Sikh Gurus lives reference Guru Har Rai writing Bani. It cannot therefore be securely attributed to Guru Har Rai. Gurus each had their own way of starting poems or couplets. Guru Har Rai's was: Through the voice of Har Rai, the Guru. A sentence attributed to Guru Har Rai in the form of a vak (commandment) can be found in a manuscript of the Ād Granth dating to 1667 associated with Jograj (died 1671).

== Legacy ==
In 2011, 14 March was the date selected to celebrate Sikh Environment Day because it was the anniversary date of Guru Har Rai's gurgaddi (ascension to the guruship).

In 2013, the president of EcoSikh described Guru Har Rai as the "green guru", emphasizing the Sikh guru's close-bond with nature, in a press-release statement.

== Popular culture ==
In 2013, a painting by Rahi Mohinder Singh was gifted to EcoSikh which depicts Guru Har Rai giving a tree to a petitioner to plant, however the tree species portrayed in the painting is an eucalyptus, a non-native species that was not found during the lifetime of Guru Har Rai, making the painting anachronistic.

== Gallery ==
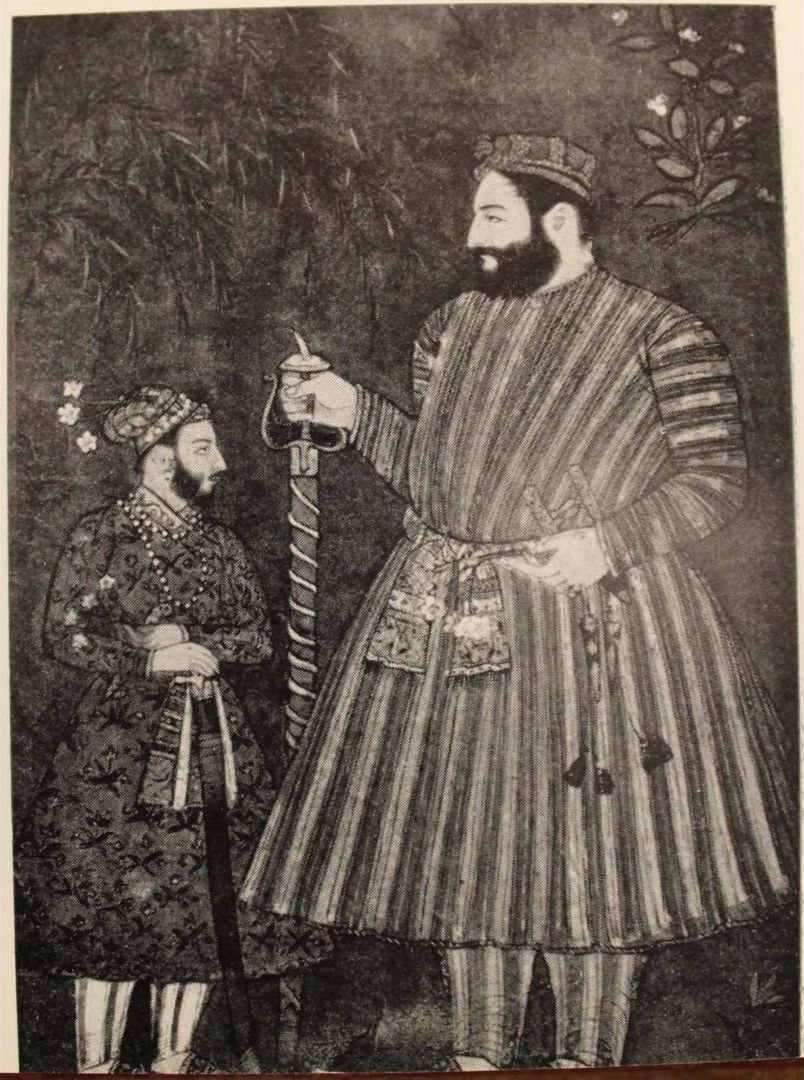
Guru Hargobind (right) with his grandson, the young Har Rai (left).

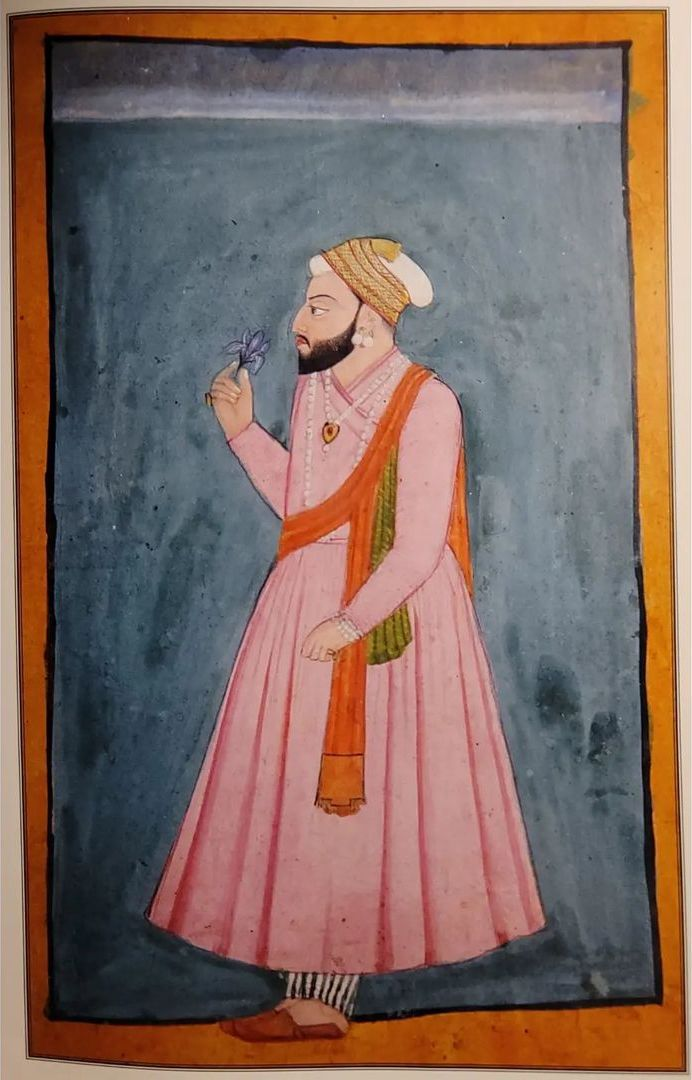
Guru Har Rai, Pahari painting.

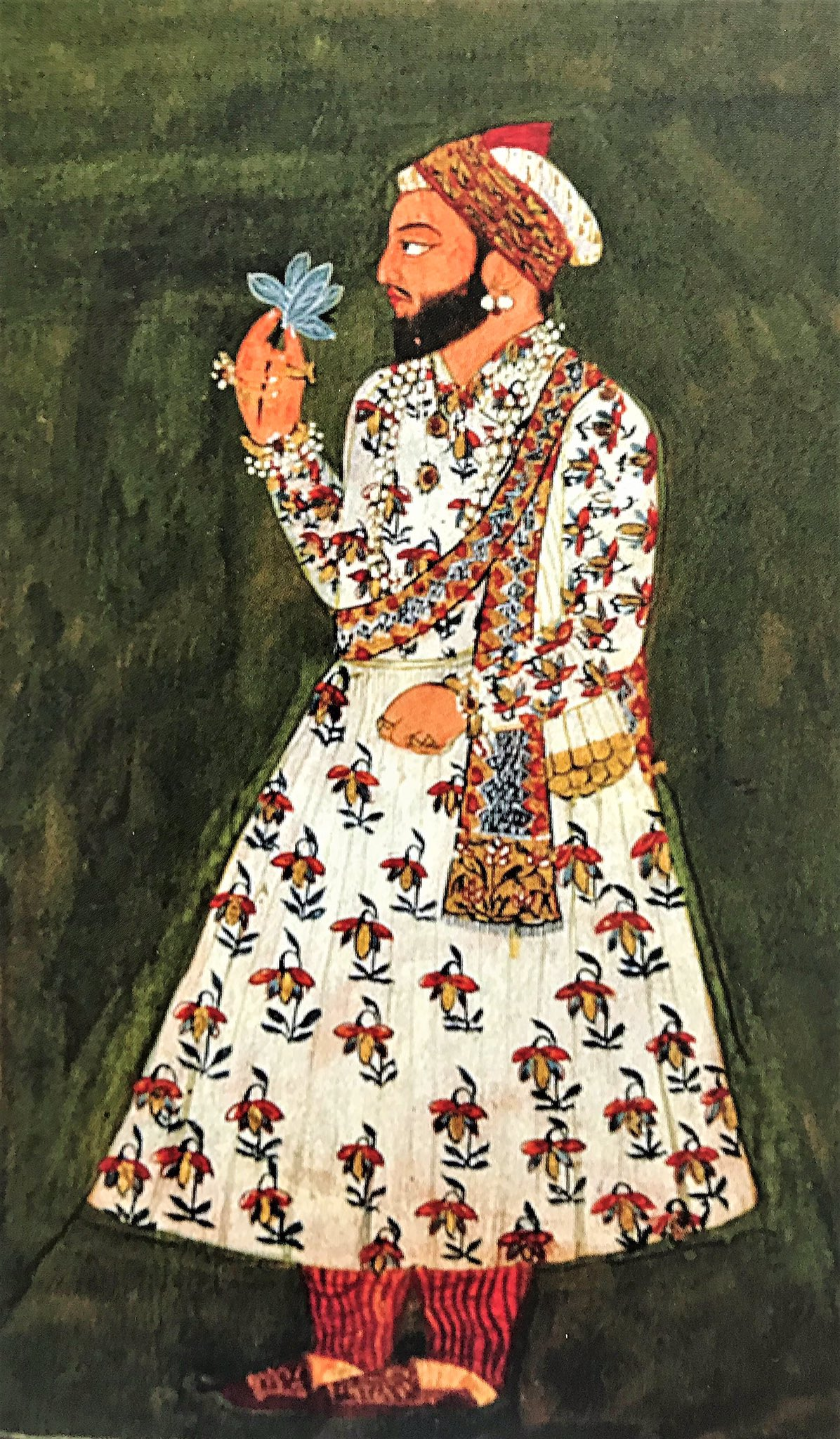
Portrait of Guru Har Rai holding a blue flower

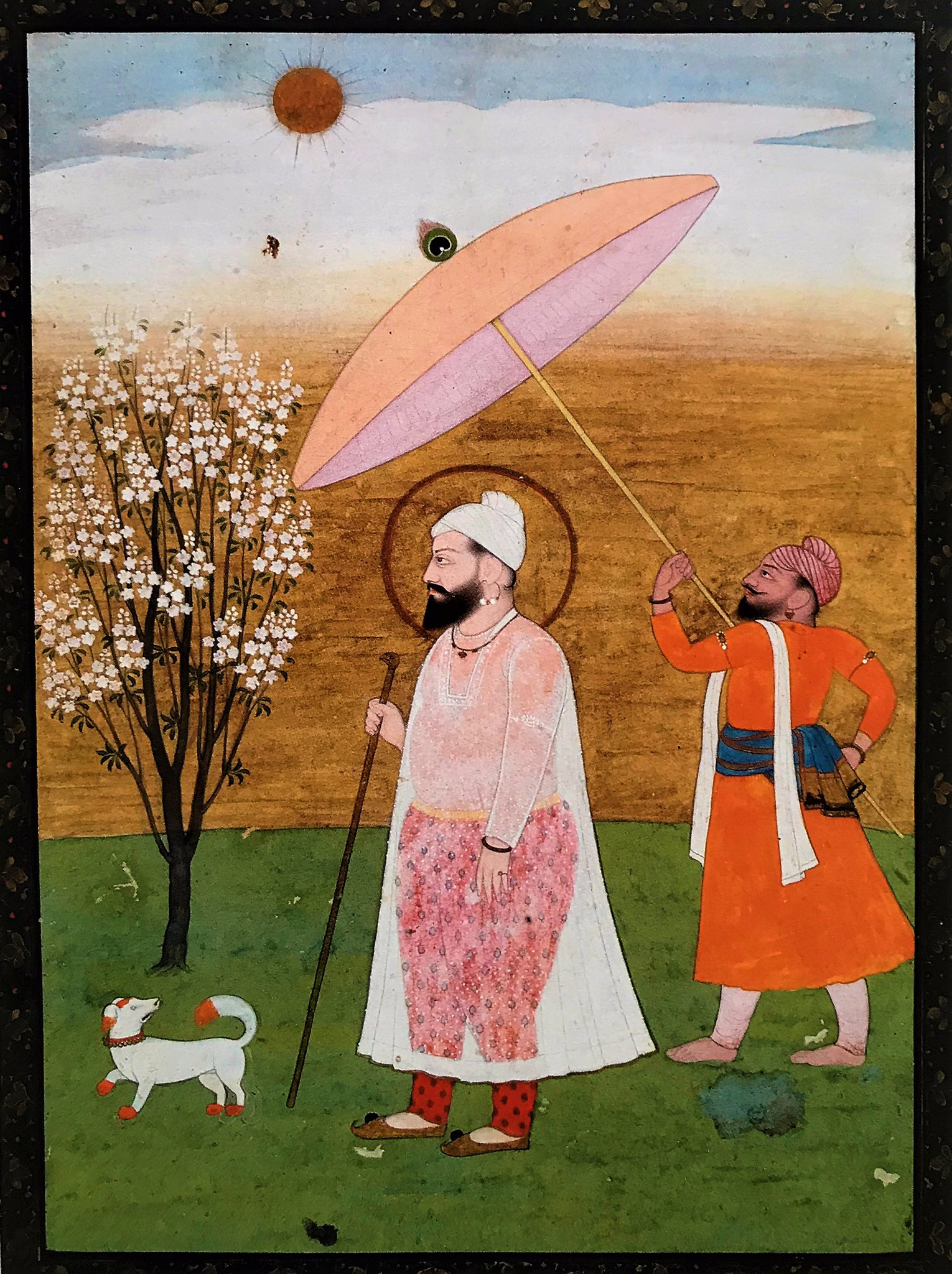
Guru Har Rai, the Seventh Guru (ca.1800–1825 Pahari painting)

Preceded by Guru Hargobind	Sikh Guru; 3 March 1644 – 6 October 1661	Succeeded by Guru Har Krishan
