= Üvvärjärv =

Lake in Estonia

- Location within Estonia
- Coordinates: 57°44′55″N 27°01′54″E
- Basin countries: Estonia
- Max. length: 290 meters (950 ft)
- Surface area: 2.6 hectares (6.4 acres)
- Average depth: 3.6 meters (12 ft)
- Max. depth: 9.8 meters (32 ft)
- Water volume: 77,000 cubic meters (2,700,000 cu ft)
- Shore length^{1}: 720 meters (2,360 ft)
- Surface elevation: 214 meters (702 ft)
- ^{1} Shore length is not a well-defined measure.

Üvvärjärv (also Üvarjärv) is a lake in Estonia. It is located in the village of Soodi in Rõuge Parish, Võru County.

== Physical description ==
The lake has an area of 2.6 hectares (6.4 acres). The lake has an average depth of 3.6 meters (12 ft) and a maximum depth of 9.8 meters (32 ft). It is 290 meters (950 ft) long, and its shoreline measures 720 meters (2,360 ft). It has a volume of 77,000 cubic meters (2,700,000 cu ft).

== See also ==
- List of lakes of Estonia
