= Rup Kaur =

Sikh author and daughter of Guru Har Rai

- Born: 8 April 1649 or 1652
- Died: before December 1705
- Father: Guru Har Rai
- Relatives: Guru Har Krishan (brother); Ram Rai (brother

Rup Kaur (born 8 April 1649 or 1652), also spelt as Roop Kaur, was the daughter of Guru Har Rai and sister of Guru Har Krishan. (Note: In some sources, her name is given as 'Sarup Kaur' or 'Harup Kaur'.) She was born in the Shish Mahal of Kiratpur. Sources conflict on her existence and relationship to Guru Har Rai. She may have been one of the earliest literate Sikh women and she produced her own works. Her writings remain one of the few sources regarding the teachings of Guru Har Rai. Some of her personal items and writings are preserved at Gurdwara Manji Sahib in Kiratpur. She personally knew four of the ten Sikh gurus: her father Guru Har Rai, brother Guru Har Krishan, Guru Tegh Bahadur, and Guru Gobind Singh.

== Historicity ==
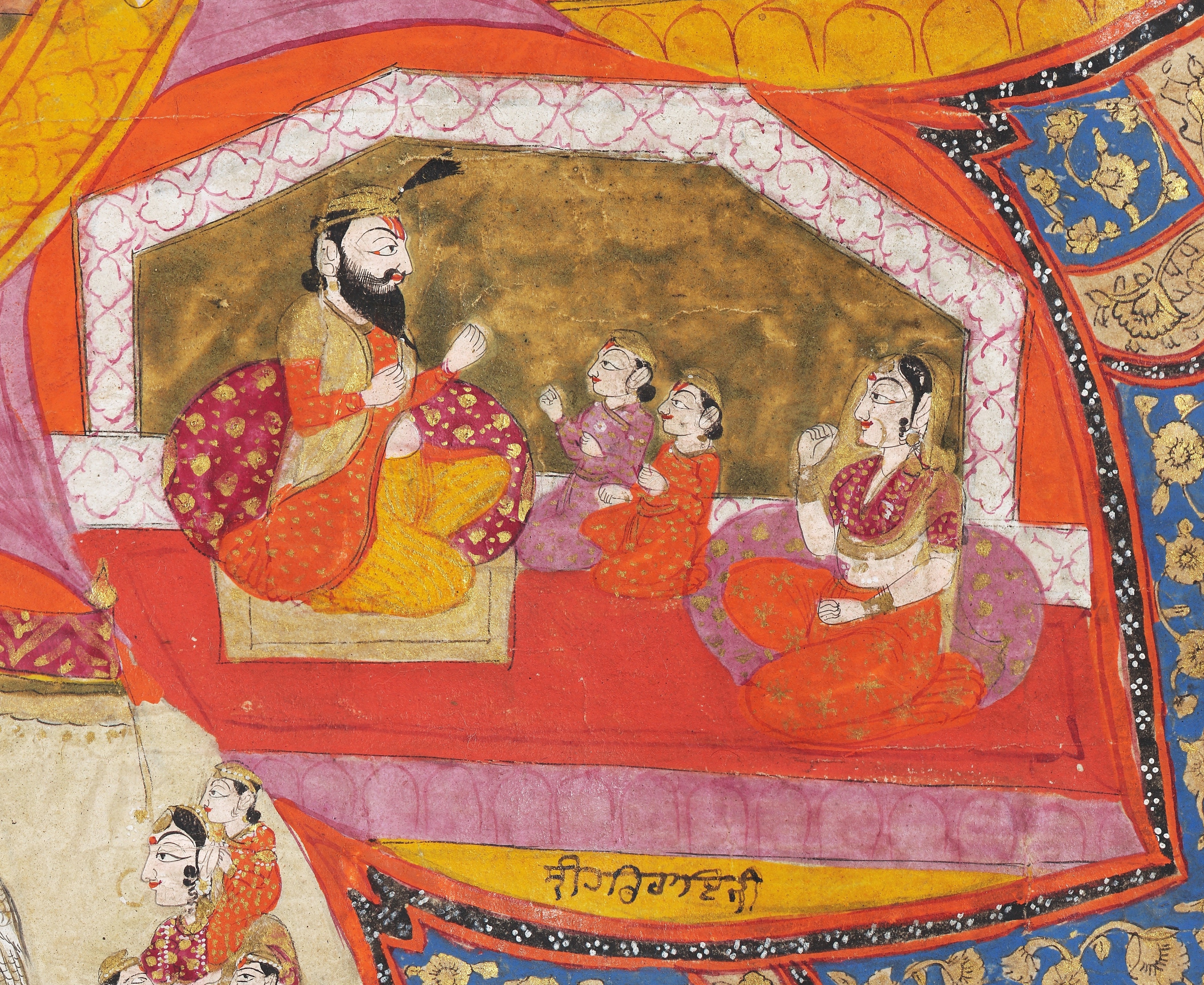
19th century depiction of Guru Har Rai with his wife, Mata Sulakhani, and two sons, Ram Rai and Har Krishan. No daughter is depicted.

Sources are conflicted on Rup Kaur's existence and relationship to Guru Har Rai. There is also a disagreement amongst sources on whether she was the biological or adopted daughter of Guru Har Rai. According to Kesar Singh Chibber, Guru Har Rai married Kot Kalyani (also known as Sunita), who gave birth to Guru Har Krishan, meanwhile he had also married Punjab Kaur, who gave birth to Ram Rai and a certain Sarup Kaur. However, Surjit Singh Gandhi claims this is a mistake by Chibber as Punjab Kaur was actually the wife of Ram Rai, not Guru Har Rai. The chronicles on the life of the seventh guru authored by Kavi Saundh in the 18th century and Sarup Das Bhalla's Mehma Prakash do not make any mention of a daughter being born to Guru Har Rai, only mentioning two sons, Ram Rai and Har Krishan, being born to Mata Sulakhani (Sulakhani is also known as 'Kishan Kaur'). However, the Bhat Vahis, Gurparnalis, and Panda Vahis (genealogical records of Haridwar) do make mention to a daughter named Sarup Kaur being born to Guru Har Rai, although they mix fact with fiction and conflict with one another regarding dates. Using the dates provided in the records, Gandhi concludes that Ram Rai was born in 1647, Sarup Kaur in 1652, and Harkrishan on 7 July 1656. (Note: The Bikrami date of Guru Har Krishan's birth is Savan Vadi 10, Bikrami Sammat 1713.) According to one Bhatt Vahi, the Bhaṭṭ Vahī Talauḍā, Rup Kaur was the biological daughter of Guru Har Rai and Mata Sulakhani. Simran Kaur in Prasidh Sikh Bibian in 2005 asserts she was an adopted daughter of the guru rather than a biological one. However, other authors maintain she was the guru's biological daughter who was born in Kiratpur, such as Giani Garja Singh and Mohinder Kaur Gill.

== Name ==
Rup Kaur had Kaur appended to her name, which gives credence to the practice of Sikh women having the title as part of their name prior to the Singh Sabha movement's popularization of the practice in the late 19th and early 20th centuries.

== Marriage and family ==
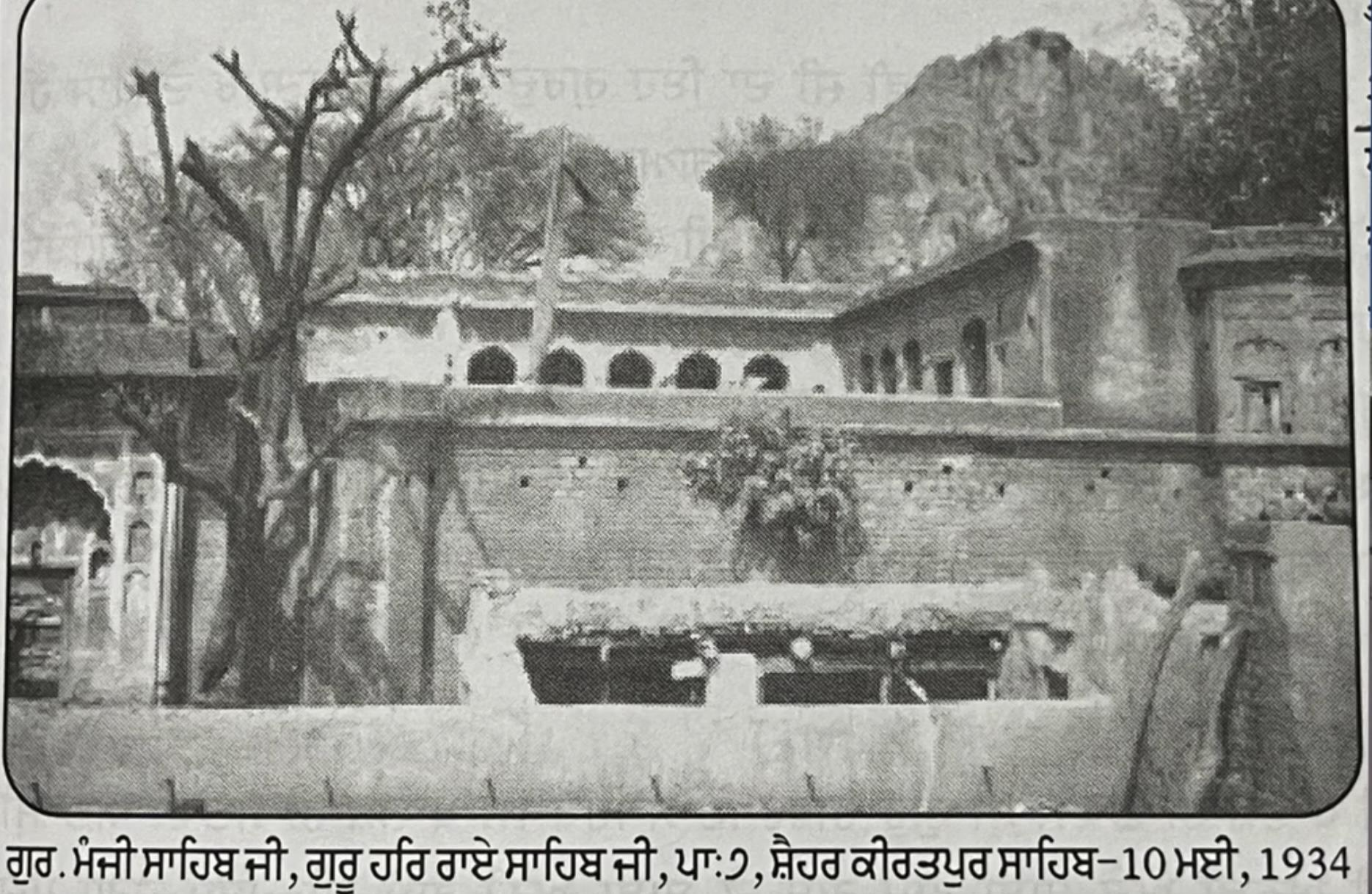
Photograph of Gurdwara Sri Manji Sahib, Kiratpur Sahib, Punjab, by Dhanna Singh 'Patialvi', 10 May 1934. The gurdwara was the former place of residence of Rup Kaur and relics associated with her are preserved there.

Rup Kaur married Khem Karan, son of a Dhussā Khatri named Bhai Paira Mal of Pasrur in Sialkot District on 3 December or 4 November 1662, with the couple after moving to Kot Kalyanpur village, located near Kiratpur. On the occasion of the wedding, Mata Bassi presented Rup Kaur with five gifts, namely Guru Nanak's seli and topi, Guru Hargobind's katar weapon, a pothi associated with a Sikh guru (Guru Sahib diyan Sakhian di pothi), and a rehal (where the pothi's prakash was undertaken).

The house the couple lived in is now known as Gurdwara Manji Sahib in Kiratpur, where relics associated with Rup Kaur are preserved. After the death of Guru Har Rai, Rup Kaur and her husband moved to Dayalpur, near Banur. In February 1664, Guru Har Krishan made a stop in Dayalpur while travelling to Delhi to visit his sister Sarup Kaur and her husband. After the death of her brother, Guru Har Krishan, Rup Kaur returned to Kiratpur for mourning. Dargah Mall and Munshi Kalyan Das had travelled to Kiratpur to inform Rup Kaur of her brother's death in Delhi. Shortly after his succession to guruship, Guru Tegh Bahadur visited Rup Kaur in Kiratpur on 21 August 1664 to console her over the death of her brother Guru Har Krishan. A visit by Guru Tegh Bahadur to Rup Kaur and her mother Mata Sulakhani is also mentioned in the Guru Kian Sakhian. A meeting between Rup Kaur and Guru Gobind Singh in Anandpur is also recorded after the guru fought the Battle of Bhangani. She also visited Suraj Mal, son of Guru Hargobind, in 1701, whose wife, Mata Hari, had recently died.

Rup Kaur and her husband gave birth to a son named Amar Chand, who took on the name Amar Singh after being baptized into the Khalsa later by Guru Gobind Singh in 1699. The descendants of her son reside in Dayalpur Sodhian in Patiala district, Punjab, where they built a haveli and dharamsaal which was later renovated by Banarasi Das in 1906. The descendants resided there until the end of the 20th century, with one notable name being Bibi Ralla.

== Education and literature ==
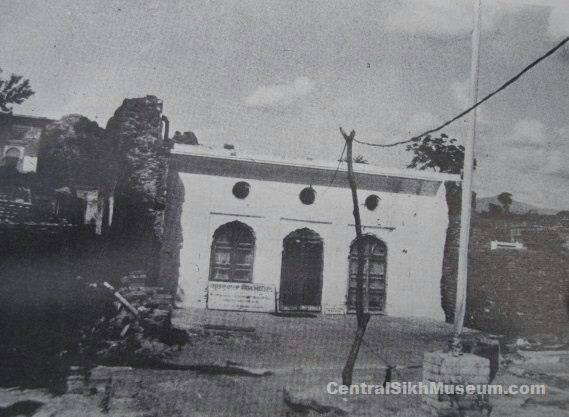
Photograph of the historical structure of the Shish Mahal in Kirtatpur

At the age of three, Rup Kaur, alongside her brother Ram Rai, was sent to Diwan Durga Mal to be educated in the Gurmukhi script and gurbani. Rup Kaur also learnt the art of sewing and needling from her mother and grandmother, Kishan Kaur and Mata Bassi, respectively. She often paid visits to her father in Kiratpur, visiting the gardens alongside him near the Shish Mahal.

Rup Kaur's father, Guru Har Rai, had gifted her a pothi (volume) of gurbani on the occasion of her marriage, which is now preserved at Gurdwara Manji Sahib in Kiratpur. The pothi consists of 559 pages, mostly consisting of gurbani, with Rup Kaur later adding her own writings toward the end of the pothi. Rup Kaur wrote the Guru ke Munh dian Sakhian, a work that contains 32 sakhis, of varying lengths, related to the guruship of her father, Guru Har Rai, within the pothi starting on page 492. (Note: The name of the literary work produced by Rup Kaur is also rendered as 'Sri Satguru Ji De Muheyn Dian Sakhian'.) There are also sakhis related to Guru Amar Das and Guru Arjan in the work. The work is also known as Pothi Bibi Rup Kaur. The work was written by Rup Kaur shortly after her father's death in 1661. In the work, Rup Kaur explains how to properly conduct the daily Ardas prayer. She also preserved a teaching regarding the treatment of women in her writings.

Piara Singh Padam published some of the sakhis found in the work in Prachin Punjabi Gadd. Narinder Kaur Bhatia also published information regarding the pothi in her work Sri Satguru Ji de Muhain dian Sakhian.

== Death and legacy ==
Rup Kaur died in Dayalpur, where present-day Gurdwara Nabha Sahib is located. Rup Kaur died sometime before December 1705 and her family relocated to Banur. Her literary contribution remains one of the few contemporary sources on the guruship of her father, Guru Har Rai. According to Daljit Kaur, the managers of Gurdwara Manji Sahib have mistakenly attributed the relics held there to Bibi Veero, daughter of Guru Hargobind, where in-fact they should be properly related to Rup Kaur.
