= Gurdwara Bangla Sahib =

Gurdwara in Delhi, India

Coordinates: 28°37′36″N 77°12′32″E

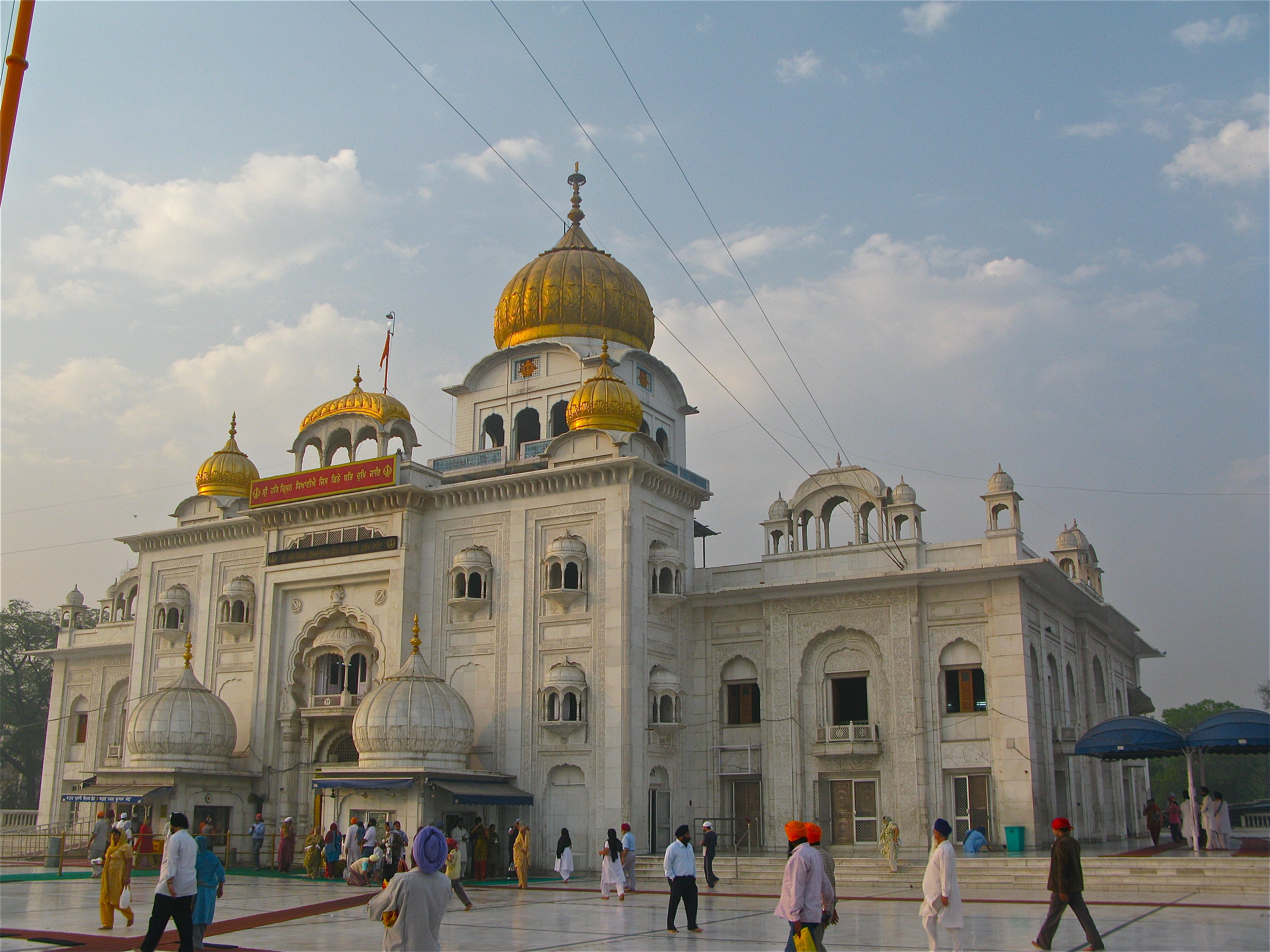
- Gurdwara Bangla Sahib as viewed from Main Entrance.

Religion
- Affiliation: Sikhism

Location
- Location: Connaught Place, Delhi, India.
- Interactive map of Gurdwara Bangla Sahib

Architecture
- Style: Sikh architecture, Mughal architecture
- Founder: Sardar Baghel Singh
- Completed: 1664 as a bungalow, again rebuilt in 1783, current structure mostly built post 1947

Gurdwara Bangla Sahib is Sikh gurdwara, or Sikh house of worship, in Delhi, India, and is known for its association with the eighth Sikh Guru, Guru Har Krishan, as well as the holy pond inside its complex, known as the "Sarovar." Originally a bungalow of Raja Jai Singh I of Amber, it was rebuilt as a small shrine by Sikh general Sardar Baghel Singh in 1783. In the same year, there was reconstruction of nine Sikh shrines in Delhi.

It is located near Connaught Place, New Delhi, on Baba Kharak Singh Marg, and it is recognisable by its golden dome and tall flagpole.

== History ==
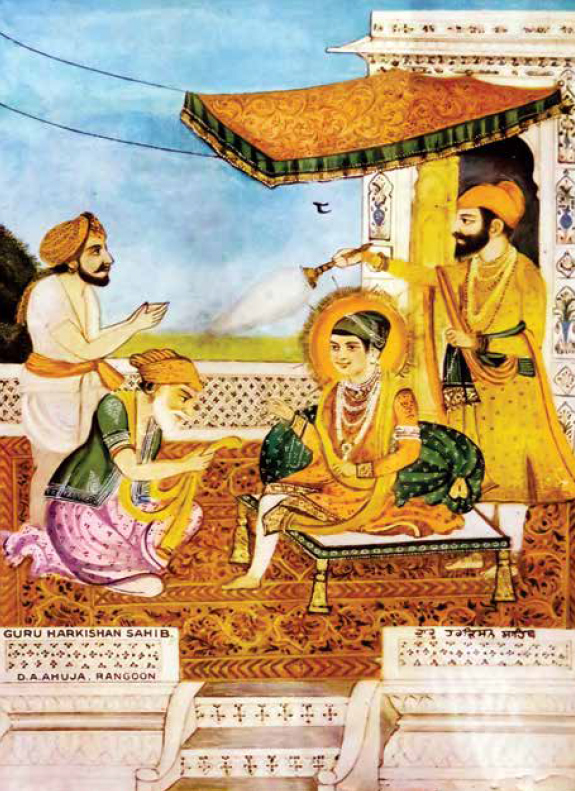
Painting of Guru Har Krishan blessing Raja Jai Singh of Jaipur, by D.A. Ahuja of Rangoon

Gurdwara Bangla Sahib was originally a bungalow belonging to Raja Jai Singh, a Hindu Rajput ruler in the seventeenth century. Guru Har Krishan stayed at the bungalow after being invited to Delhi by Jai Singh. Guru Har Krishan had been summoned to Delhi by Aurangzeb as his legitimacy as the Sikh guru was challenged by Ram Rai; however Raja Jai Singh and Raja Ram Singh decided to assist him to visit, and Jai Singh offered his bungalow as a residence until the succession dispute was resolved. While in Delhi, Guru Har Krishan provided charity to the local people of the city who were sick, with him instructing Diwan Dargah Mal to spend all the daily offerings on the downtrodden. However, Guru Har Krishan died in Delhi on 6 October 1661. Raja Jai Singh would construct a small tank over its well, whose waters are taken home by modern Sikhs as amrit for its supposed healing properties.

Since Guru Har Krishan stayed at Raja Jai Singh's bungalow (pronounced bangla in the local vernacular), it has now been converted to a gurdwara called the Bangla Sahib to memorialise Guru Har Krishan's stay there. The eighth Sikh Guru, Har Krishan resided here during his stay in Delhi in 1664. He died on 30 March 1664. The gurdwara and its Sarovar are now a place of great reverence for Sikhs, and a place for special congregation on birth anniversary of Guru Har Krishan. The sarovar measures 225 by 235 feet with an 18 foot wide parkarma and a 12 foot wide veranda along its three sides.

In 1984, during the anti-Sikh riots, some 150 Sikhs took sanctuary inside the gurdwara. A Hindu mob carrying cans of gasoline, attempted to storm into the temple, but were driven back.

The Delhi Sikh Gurdwara Management Committee operates a hospital in the sublevels of the structure. In March 2021, the gurdwara inaugurated the cheapest diagnostic centre with the aim to provide healthcare for the poor. The patients can get an MRI scan at ₹50. Also connected to the site is a Khalsa Girls School and an art-gallery and museum named after Baghel Singh.

== Gallery ==
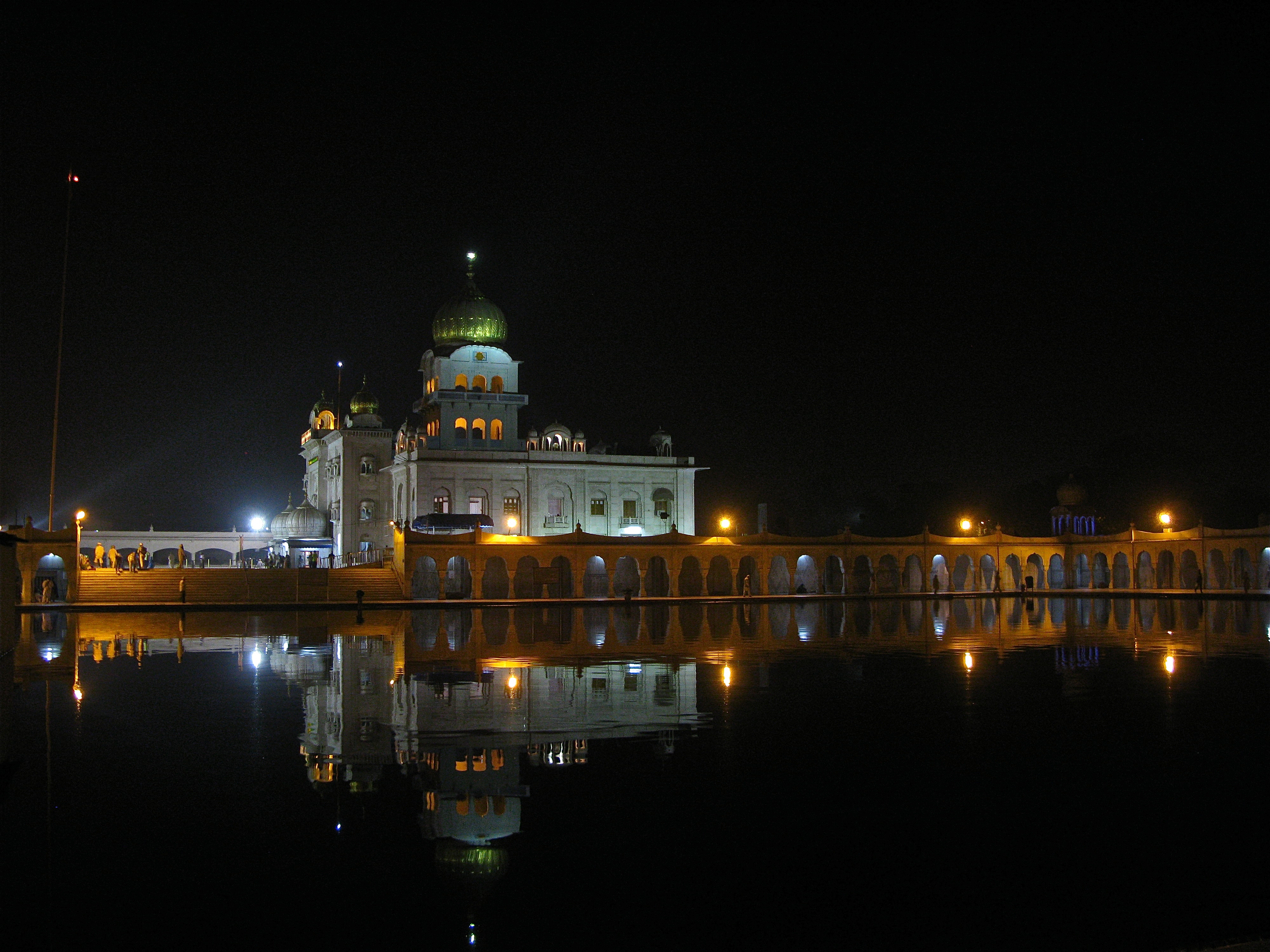
Night view of Gurdwara Bangla Sahib and the sarovar.

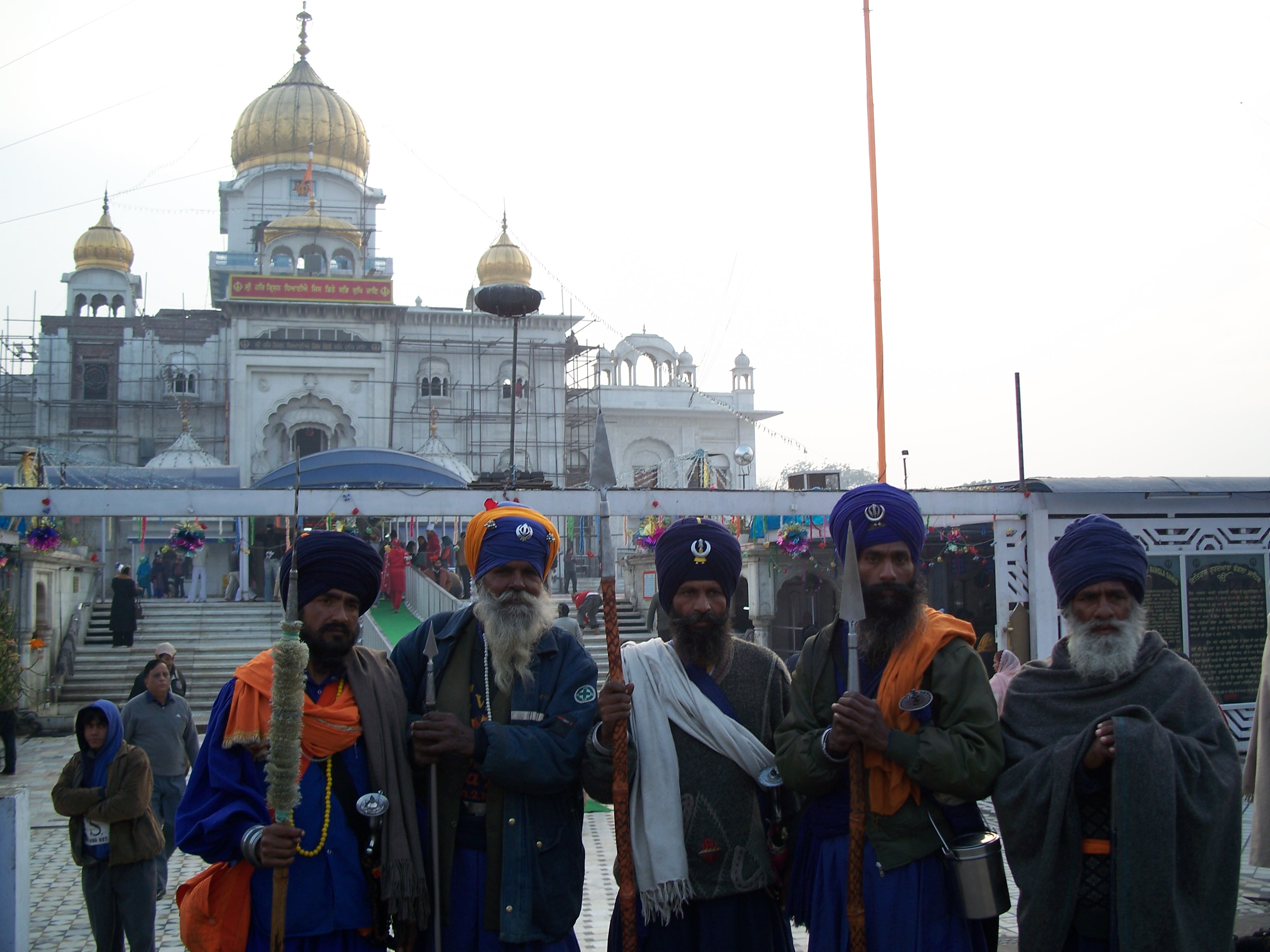
Nihangs at Gurdwara Bangla Sahib

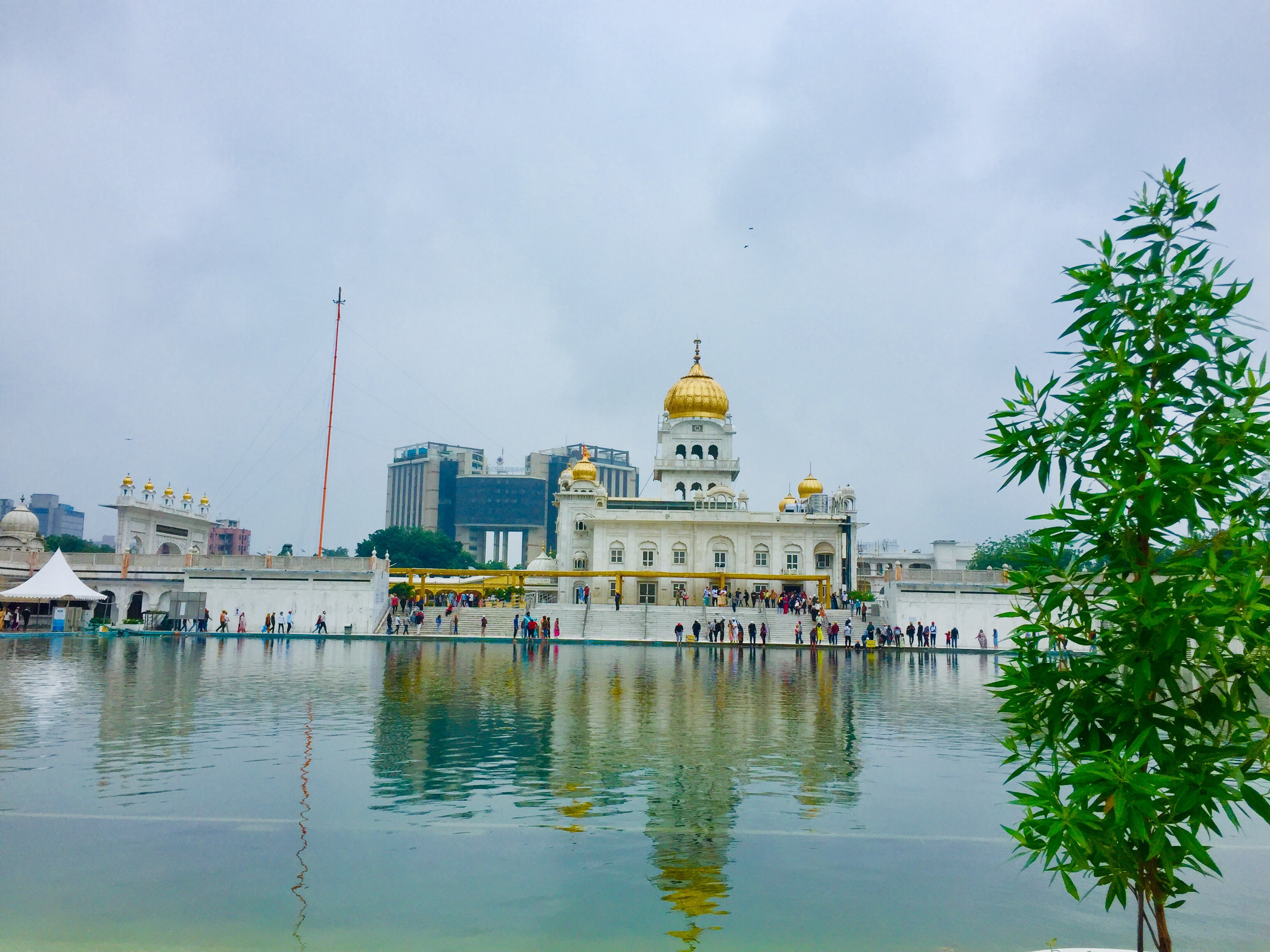
Gurdwara Bangla Sahib viewed across from the sarovar

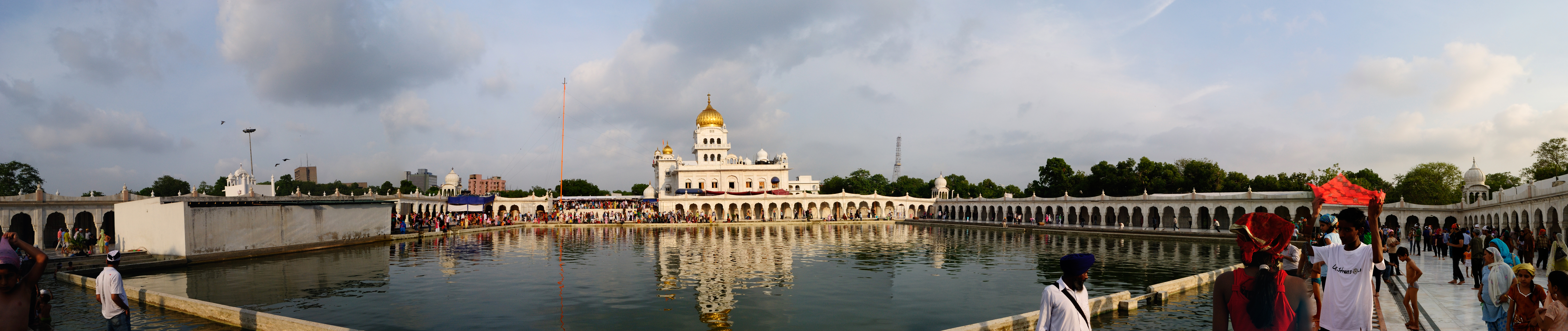
Panorama view across the sarovar of the complex

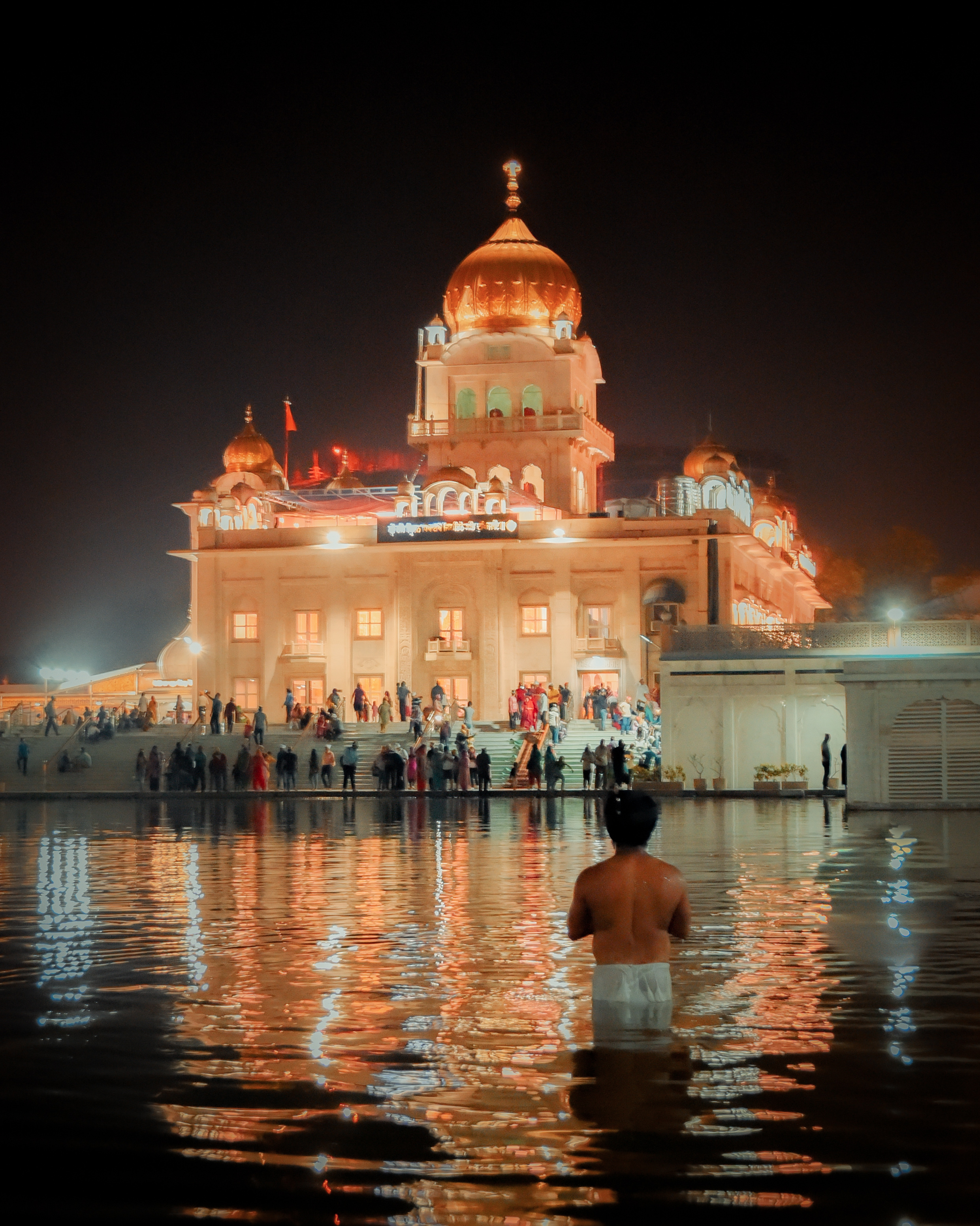
Lighting decorations of the gurdwara

== See also ==
- Gurdwara Rakab Ganj Sahib
