= Suds =

Suds or SUDS may refer to:

== Common meanings ==
- Slang for beer
- Foam
- Colloquial name for soluble oil cutting fluid (British English)

== Acronym ==
- Subjective units of distress scale, in psychology
- Sudden unexpected death syndrome, the sudden unexpected death of adolescents and adults during sleep
- Sustainable drainage system, an approach to urban water drainage system design
- Sydney University Dramatic Society

== Film and television ==
- Suds (film), a 1920 silent film produced by and starring Mary Pickford
- "Suds" (SpongeBob SquarePants), an episode of season 1 of the animated television series SpongeBob SquarePants
- Suds McDuff, a fictional mascot in The Simpsons episode "Old Yeller-Belly"

== People ==
- Suds Merrick (died 1884), New York river pirate
- nickname of Gene Fodge (1931–2010), American baseball pitcher
- nickname of Harvey Suds Sutherland (1894–1972), American Major League Baseball pitcher and outfielder

== Other uses ==
- Sandusky Suds, a baseball team in the Ohio State League in 1887
- "Suds", a track on the 1966 James Brown album Mighty Instrumentals

== See also ==
- Sud (disambiguation)
