= Sood (surname) =

Sood or Sud is an Indian surname.

== People with Surname ==
Notable people bearing this surname include:

- Ajay K. Sood (born 1951), Indian physicist and Padma Shri awardee
- Amit Sood, Indian American physician, researcher, writer at Mayo Clinic College of Medicine, Rochester, USA
- Anish Sood (born 1980), Indian musician, DJ and songwriter
- Anita Sood (born 1966), Indian swimmer
- Anjali Sud (born 1983) Indian American businesswoman, former CEO of Vimeo and current CEO of Tubi
- Anuj Sood (1989–2020), Indian army officer
- Anupam Sud (born 1944), Indian artist and printmaker
- Ashish Sood (born 1966), Indian politician
- Ashwin Sood (born 1967), Canadian musician and drummer
- Asmita Sood (born 1989), Indian model and actress
- Bimla Kashyap Sood (born 1942), Indian politician of the Bharatiya Janata Party, Shimla and member of Rajya Sabha
- Chandril Sood (born 1991), Indian tennis player
- Danish Pratap Sood (born 1996), Indian actor and musician
- Lakshit Sood (born 1991), Indian tennis player
- Man Sood (1939–2020), Indian cricketer
- Manjula Sood (1945–2025), Indian British politician, and first Asian female Lord Mayor
- Manoj Sood (born 1962), Indian Canadian actor
- Neeraj Sood (born 1969), Indian actor
- Neeraj Sood (1970–2010), Indian colonel
- Pooja Sood, Indian curator, founding member and Director of KHOJ International Artist’s Association
- Prakash Chandra Sood (born 1928), Indian nuclear physicist and professor
- Praveen Sood (born 1964), Indian police officer
- Rakesh Sood (born 1953), Indian diplomat, columnist and writer, former Indian Ambassador and Special Envoy for Disarmament and Non-proliferation
- Rahul Sood (born 1973), Canadian businessman and Founder of VooDoo PC
- Randhir Sud, Indian gastroenterologist and Padma Shri awardee
- Ravi Sood (born 1976), Canadian financier and venture capitalist
- Ruhila Adatia-Sood (1982–2013), Indian Kenyan radio host
- Shruti Sood (born 1995), celebrated investor
- Sonu Sood (born 1973), Indian actor
- Tikshan Sud (born 1954), Indian politician of the Bharatiya Janata Party, Hoshiarpur, Punjab
- Varun Sood (cricketer) (born 1990), Indian cricketer
- Varun Sood (actor) (born 1995), Indian film actor
- Veena Sud (born 1967), Canadian-born Indian American television writer, director, and producer
- Vimla Sood (1922–2021), first woman dentist in India
- Vikram Sood, former head of the Research and Analysis Wing, and an advisor to the Observer Research Foundation

== See also ==
- Sud (disambiguation)
