= Sood, Arunachal Pradesh =

Coordinates: 27.108°N 93.664°E

Sood is a village near Naharlagun in Papum Pare district of Arunachal Pradesh
