= Sud =

Sud or SUD may refer to:

== Places ==
- Sud (Chamber of Deputies of Luxembourg constituency), a constituency in Luxembourg
- Sud (department), an administrative subdivision of Haiti
- Sud Department (Ivory Coast), defunct administrative subdivision of Ivory Coast
- South Province, New Caledonia (French: Province Sud)
- Sud, Cidra, Puerto Rico, a barrio
- Sudan, IOC code SUD

== People ==
- Anjali Sud (born 1983), Indian American businesswoman and the CEO of Vimeo
- Veena Sud, Canadian-born American television writer, director, and producer

== Organizations and companies ==
- Solidaires Unitaires Démocratiques, a French group of trade unions

== Transportation ==
- Sud Aviation, a defunct French state-owned aircraft manufacturer
- Sudbury & Harrow Road railway station, London, England (National Rail station code)
- Sudirman railway station, a railway station in Jakarta, Indonesia

== Arts, entertainment, and media ==
- Sud (band), a Filipino band
- Sud (1993 film), a film by Gabriele Salvatores
- Sud (1999 film), a Belgian-Finnish-French English-language documentary art film about the dragging death of James Byrd Jr.

== Science and technology ==
- Single use device, a label used in single use medical device reprocessing
- Stimulant use disorder
- Stood-up Drop, a measurement method for characterizing dewetting of a liquid from a solid
- Substance use disorder
- Sustainable drainage system
- 'Sud, nickname for Alfa Romeo Alfasud

== Other uses ==
- Ninlil, a Sumerian goddess originally called Sud

== See also ==
- Sud - Muntenia (development region), a region in Romania
- South (disambiguation)
- Sudd, a wetland in southern Sudan
- Sood, also Sud, an Indian surname
- Suds (disambiguation)
