= Soodi =

Village in Estonia

- Location within Estonia
- Coordinates: 57°45′14″N 27°3′24″E
- Country: Estonia
- County: Võru County
- Municipality: Rõuge Parish
- Time zone: UTC+2 (EET)

Soodi is a village in Rõuge Parish, Võru County in southeastern Estonia. Between 1991 and 2017 (until the administrative reform of Estonian municipalities), the village was located in Haanja Parish.

Üvvärjärv is located in the village.
