= Sodhian =

- Village
- Location in Punjab, India Sodhian (India)
- Coordinates: 31.0937605°N 76.024088°E
- Country: India
- State: Punjab
- District: Shaheed Bhagat Singh Nagar

Government
  - Type: Panchayat raj
  - Body: Gram panchayat
- Elevation: 254 m (833 ft)

Population (2011)
  - Total: 870
- Sex ratio 427/443 ♂/♀

Languages
  - Official: Punjabi
- Time zone: UTC+5:30 (IST)
- PIN: 144421
- Telephone code: 01823
- ISO 3166 code: IN-PB
- Post office: Bohara (B.O)
- Website: nawanshahr.nic.in

Sodhian is a village in Shaheed Bhagat Singh Nagar district of Punjab State, India. It is located 1.3 kilometres (0.81 mi) away from branch post office Bohara, 9.3 kilometres (5.8 mi) from Nawanshahr, 1.7 kilometres (1.1 mi) from district headquarter Shaheed Bhagat Singh Nagar and 100 kilometres (62 mi) from state capital Chandigarh. The village is administrated by a Sarpanch, which is an elected representative of the village.

== Demography ==
As of 2011, Sodhian has a total number of 176 houses and population of 870 of which 427 include are males while 443 are females according to the report published by Census India in 2011. The literacy rate of Sodhian is 79.25% higher than the state average of 75.84%. The population of children under the age of 6 years is 75 which is 8.62% of total population of Sodhian, and child sex ratio is approximately 923 as compared to Punjab state average of 846.

Most of the people are from Schedule Caste which constitutes 56.09% of total population in Sodhian. The town does not have any Schedule Tribe population so far.

As per the report published by Census India in 2011, 339 people were engaged in work activities out of the total population of Sodhian which includes 251 males and 88 females. According to census survey report 2011, 77.88% workers describe their work as main work and 22.12% workers are involved in Marginal activity providing livelihood for less than 6 months.

== Education ==
The village has a Punjabi medium, co-ed primary school established in 1962. The school provide mid-day meal per Indian Midday Meal Scheme. As per Right of Children to Free and Compulsory Education Act the school provide free education to children between the ages of 6 and 14.

Amardeep Singh Shergill Memorial college Mukandpur, KC Engineering College and Doaba Khalsa Trust Group Of Institutions are the nearest colleges. Industrial Training Institute for women (ITI Nawanshahr) is 11.7 kilometres (7.3 mi). The village is 77.8 kilometres (48.3 mi) away from Chandigarh University, 58 kilometres (36 mi) from Indian Institute of Technology and 42.6 kilometres (26.5 mi) away from Lovely Professional University.

== Transport ==
Nawanshahr train station is the nearest train station however, Garhshankar Junction railway station is 22 kilometres (14 mi) away from the village. Sahnewal Airport is the nearest domestic airport which located 55 kilometres (34 mi) away in Ludhiana and the nearest international airport is located in Chandigarh also Sri Guru Ram Dass Jee International Airport is the second nearest airport which is 152 kilometres (94 mi) away in Amritsar.

== See also ==
- List of villages in India
