= Sodhi Village =

Sodhi is a village in Shahganj, Uttar Pradesh, India.
