= Guru Har Krishan =

Eighth Sikh guru from 1661 to 1664

- ਗੁਰੂ ਹਰਿ ਕ੍ਰਿਸ਼ਨ
- Guru Har Krishan, detail of a painting, c. 1740–50

Personal life
- Born: Kishan Das Sodhi; 7 July 1656 Kiratpur Sahib, Lahore Subah, Mughal Empire
- Died: 30 March 1664 (aged 7) Delhi, Mughal Empire
- Cause of death: Smallpox
- Parents: Guru Har Rai (father); Mata Krishen Devi (mother)
- Other names: Bal Guru ("Child Guru"); Eighth Master; Eighth Nanak; Bala Pritam; Guru Hari Krishan
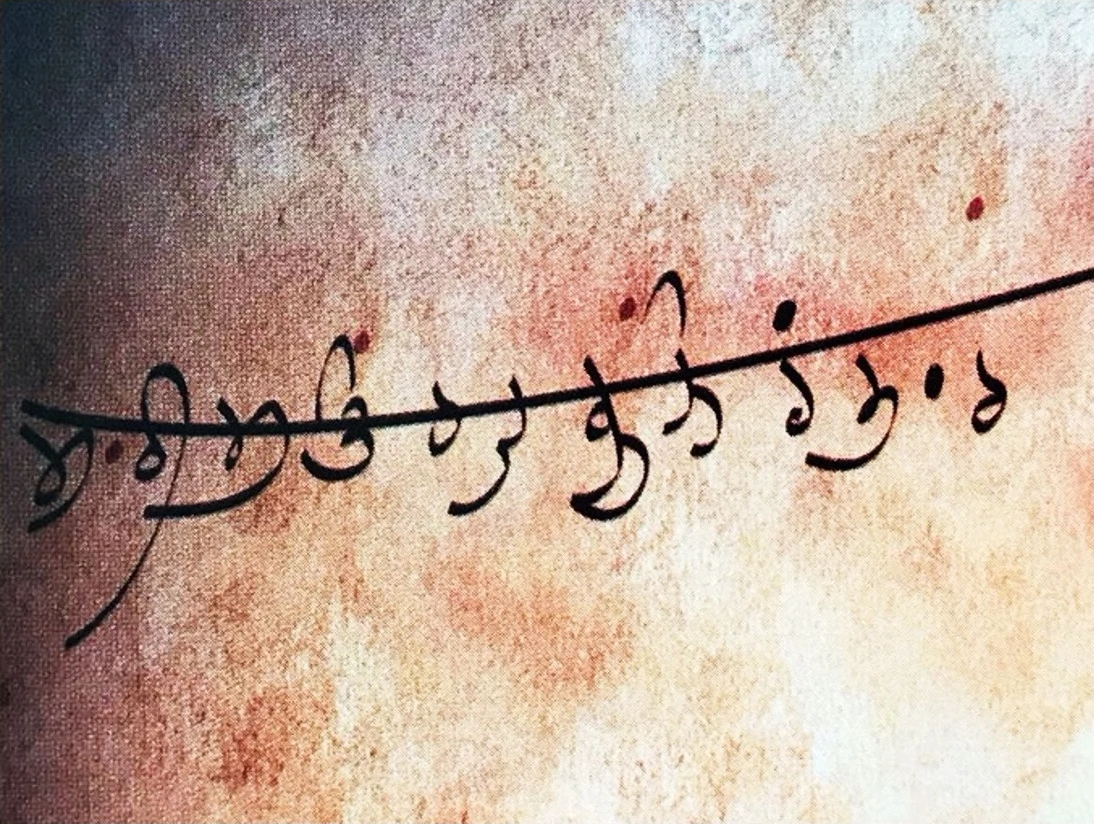
- Signature

Religious life
- Religion: Sikhism

Religious career
- Based in: Kiratpur Sahib (1661–1664)
- Period in office: 1661–1664
- Predecessor: Guru Har Rai
- Successor: Guru Tegh Bahadur

Guru Har Krishan (Gurmukhi: ਗੁਰੂ ਹਰਿ ਕ੍ਰਿਸ਼ਨ, pronunciation: [ɡʊruː həɾ kɾɪʃən]; 7 July 1656–30 March 1664) also known as Bal Guru (Child Guru), or Hari Krishan Sahib, was the eighth of the ten Sikh gurus. At the age of five, he succeeded his father, Guru Har Rai, and became the youngest guru in Sikhism. He contracted smallpox in 1664 and died before reaching his eighth birthday, with the shortest reign as guru, lasting only two years, five months, and 24 days.

He is remembered in the Sikh tradition for saying "Baba Bakale" before he died, which Sikhs interpreted to identify his grand-uncle Guru Tegh Bahadur as his successor.

== Biography ==
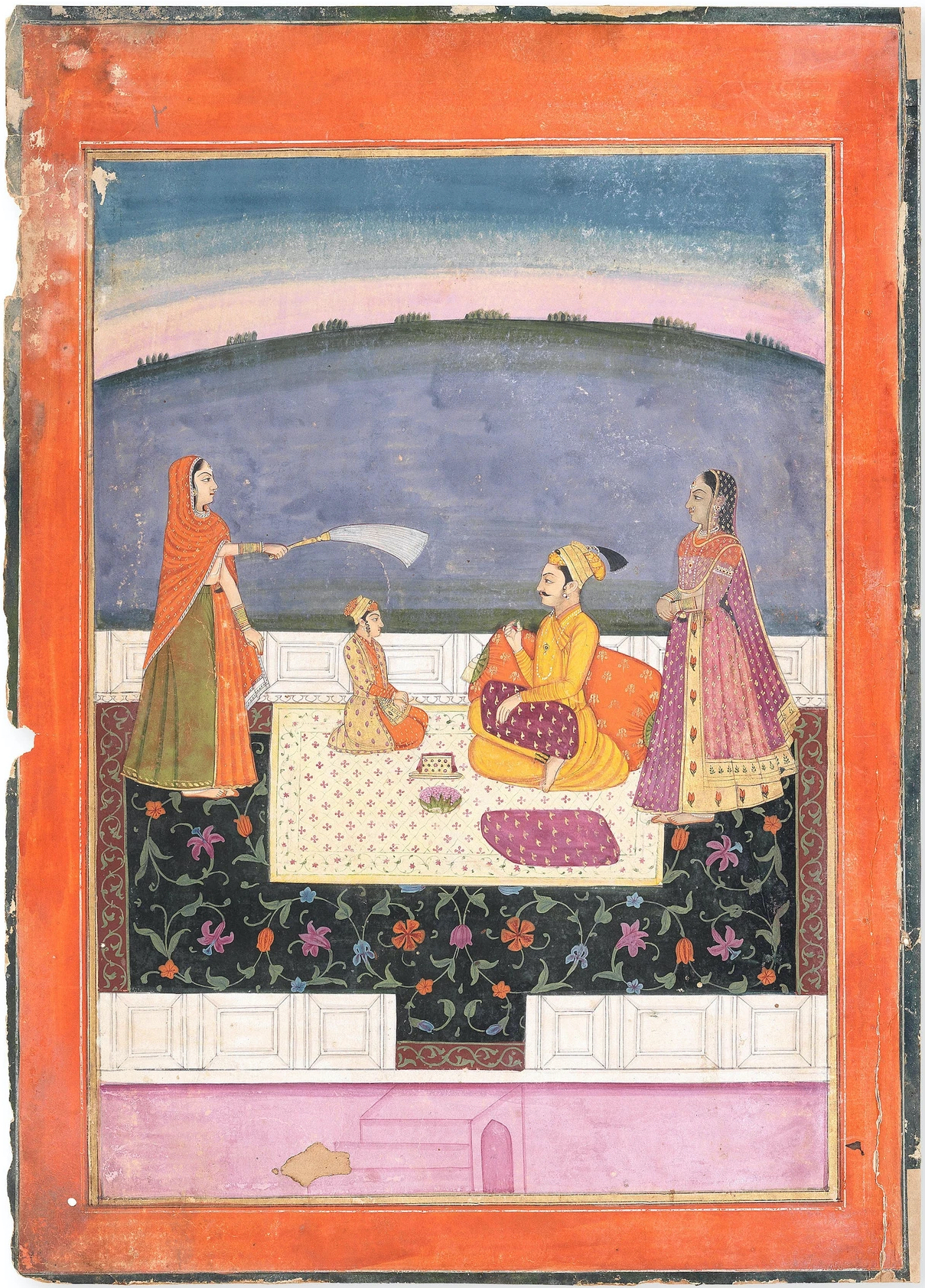
Miniature painting of Guru Har Krishan conversing with a hill raja, with attendants standing by, circa early 19th century

Har Krishan was born in Kiratpur Sahib (Shivalik Hills) in the northwest Indian subcontinent to Krishen Devi (Mata Sulakhni) and Guru Har Rai, the seventh Sikh guru, on 20 July 1652. His family belonged to the Sodhi clan of Khatris. In the war of succession to the Mughal Empire throne between the sons of Shah Jahan, Har Krishan's father supported the moderate Sufi-influenced Dara Shikoh over the conservative Sunni-influenced Aurangzeb as the two brothers entered into a war of succession to the Mughal Empire throne.

After Aurangzeb won the war in 1658, he executed his brother and later called Guru Har Rai to his court to explain his support for Dara Shikoh. Guru Har Rai, however, sent his elder son Ram Rai, aged 13, to represent him. Aurangzeb kept Ram Rai as hostage and questioned him about a verse in the Adi Granth, the Sikh holy text, claiming that it disparaged the Muslims. Instead of standing by the Sikh scripture, Ram Rai changed the verse to appease Aurangzeb, an act for which Guru Har Rai excommunicated him and nominated his younger son Har Krishan, aged five, to succeed him. The child became Sikhism's eighth guru on 7 October 1661.

Aurangzeb meanwhile rewarded Ram Rai, patronizing him with land grants in the Dehra Dun region of the Himalayas. A few years after Har Krishan assumed the role of Sikh Guru, Aurangzeb summoned him to his court in Delhi through Raja Jai Singh, with an apparent plan to replace the child guru with his elder brother Ram Rai.

When Har Krishan arrived in Delhi in 1664, however, he contracted smallpox and his meeting with Aurangzeb was canceled. Some sources state that the cancellation was due to Har Krishan's outright refusal to meet with the Mughal emperor because he foresaw that Aurangzeb would demand that he perform miracles, forbidden in Sikhism.

Har Krishan's illness, which may have occurred because he contracted smallpox while successfully curing his followers, brought him to the point of death at the age of only seven and a half. Sikh historian Kavi Santokh Singh describes the final moments of the child guru, speaking with the sangat or congregation, in which he said that there were many reasons why he was dying but that it was of no use to go into them because the gaddi (throne) of Guru Nanak Dev—representing succession of gurus—was continuous and glorious. Because the body is only temporary, he counseled, the true guru is the Granth Sahib, Sikhism's holy scripture, and that those wishing to see or speak to him could do so by just viewing or reading or listening to it. At this, the community asked him not to leave them leaderless but to bless them with someone like him, whereupon he requested a coconut and five paise—an action symbolic to Sikhs—and went on to describe the greatness of the next guru, saying that he would attract millions of followers and greatly evolve Sikhism.

He then pronounced, "Baba basay je gram bikale," which the sangat interpreted this to mean that his successor would be located in the village of Bakale. In time, Tegh Bahadur (Har Krishan's great-uncle) was identified there as the ninth Sikh guru, which greatly frustrated Aurangzeb because he had wanted Ram Rai in that position so he could control the community.

== Historiography ==
Authentic literature with more details about Guru Har Krishan's life and times is scarce and not well recorded. Although some biographies of him, particularly about who his mother was, were written in the 18th century—in particular by Kesar Singh Chhibber—and the 19th century, they are considered highly inconsistent.

== Gallery ==
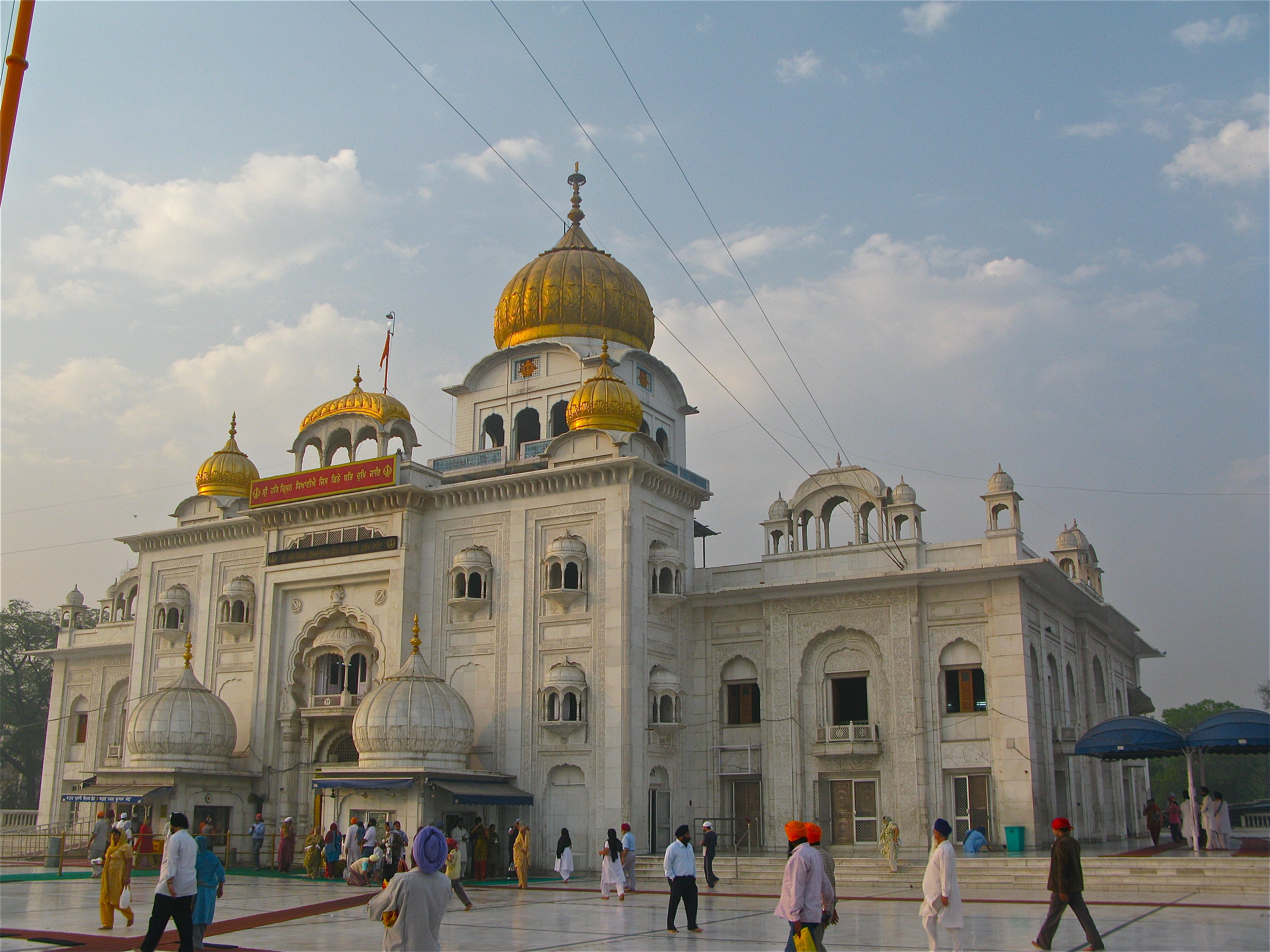
Gurudwara Bangla Sahib, residence of Raja Jai Singh of Delhi, where Guru Har Krishan died—now one of North India's most famous gurudwaras

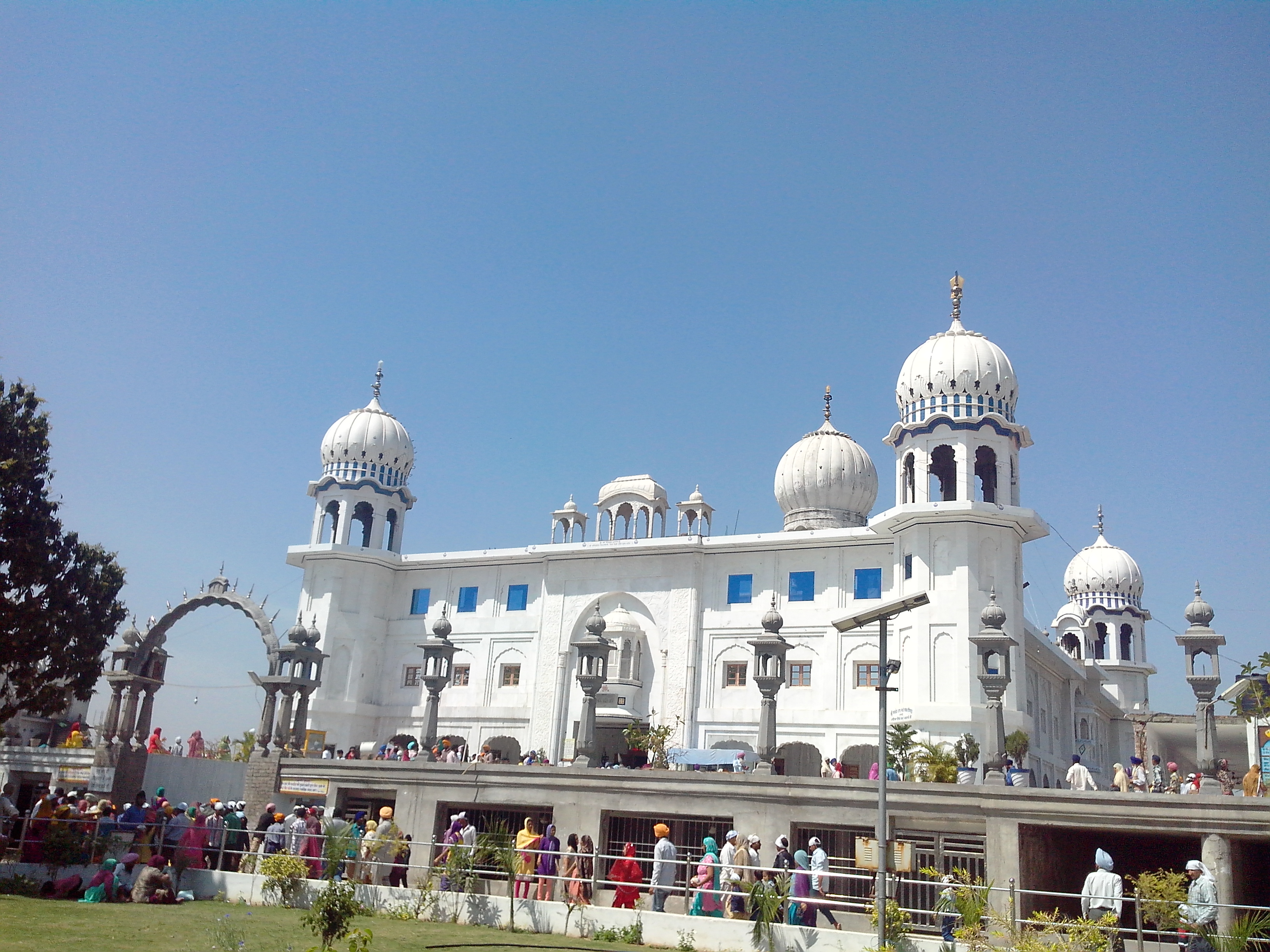
Gurudwara Panjokhra Sahib, Ambala, Haryana, which Guru Har Krishan visited on his way to Delhi—now dedicated to his memory

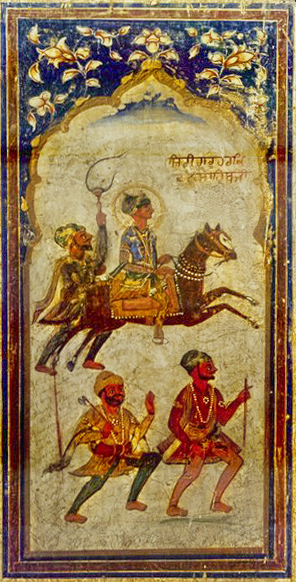
Fresco of Guru Har Krishan, circa 1745

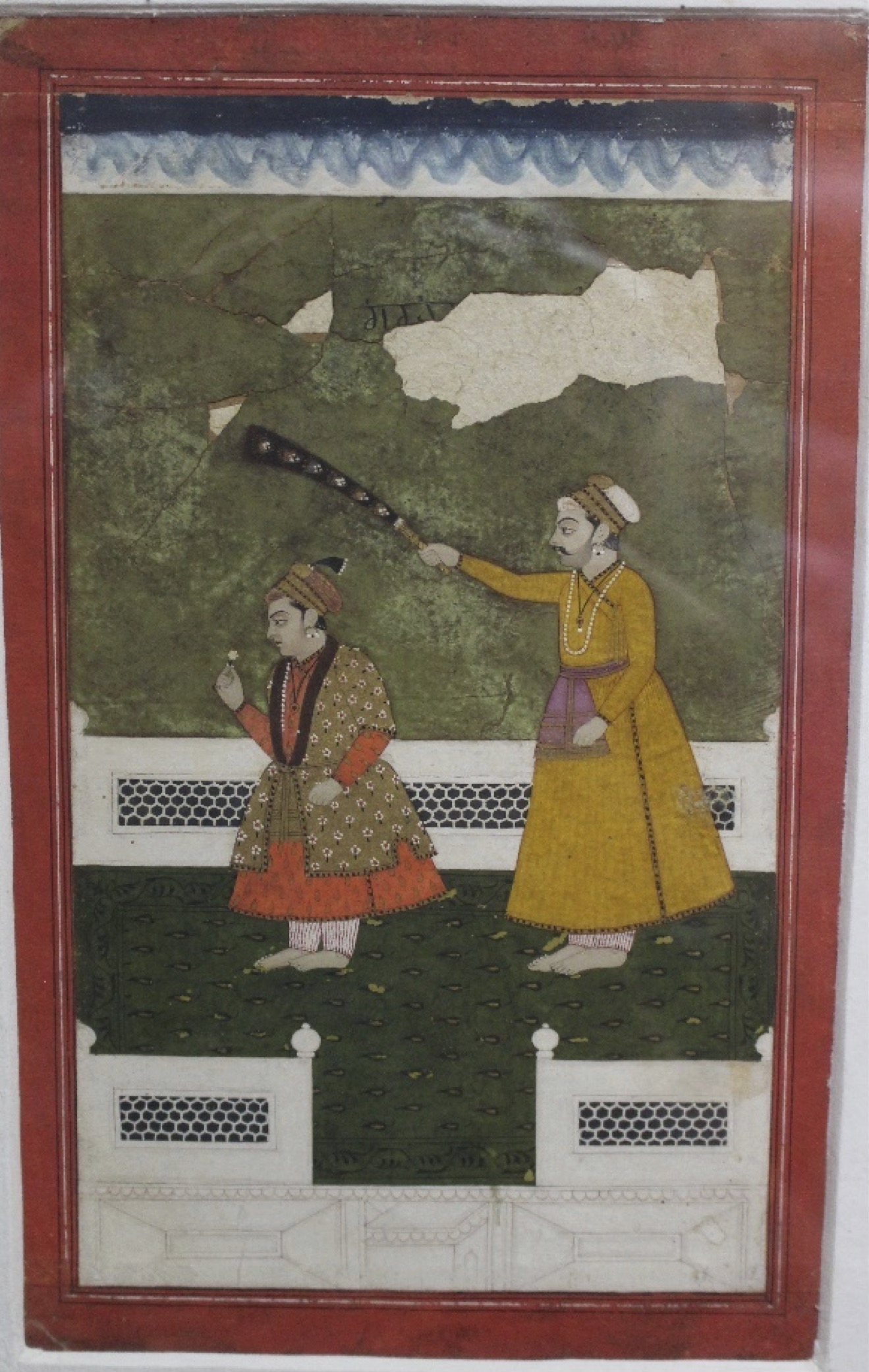
Painting of Guru Har Krishan (left) fanned by an attendant, circa 1700–1750

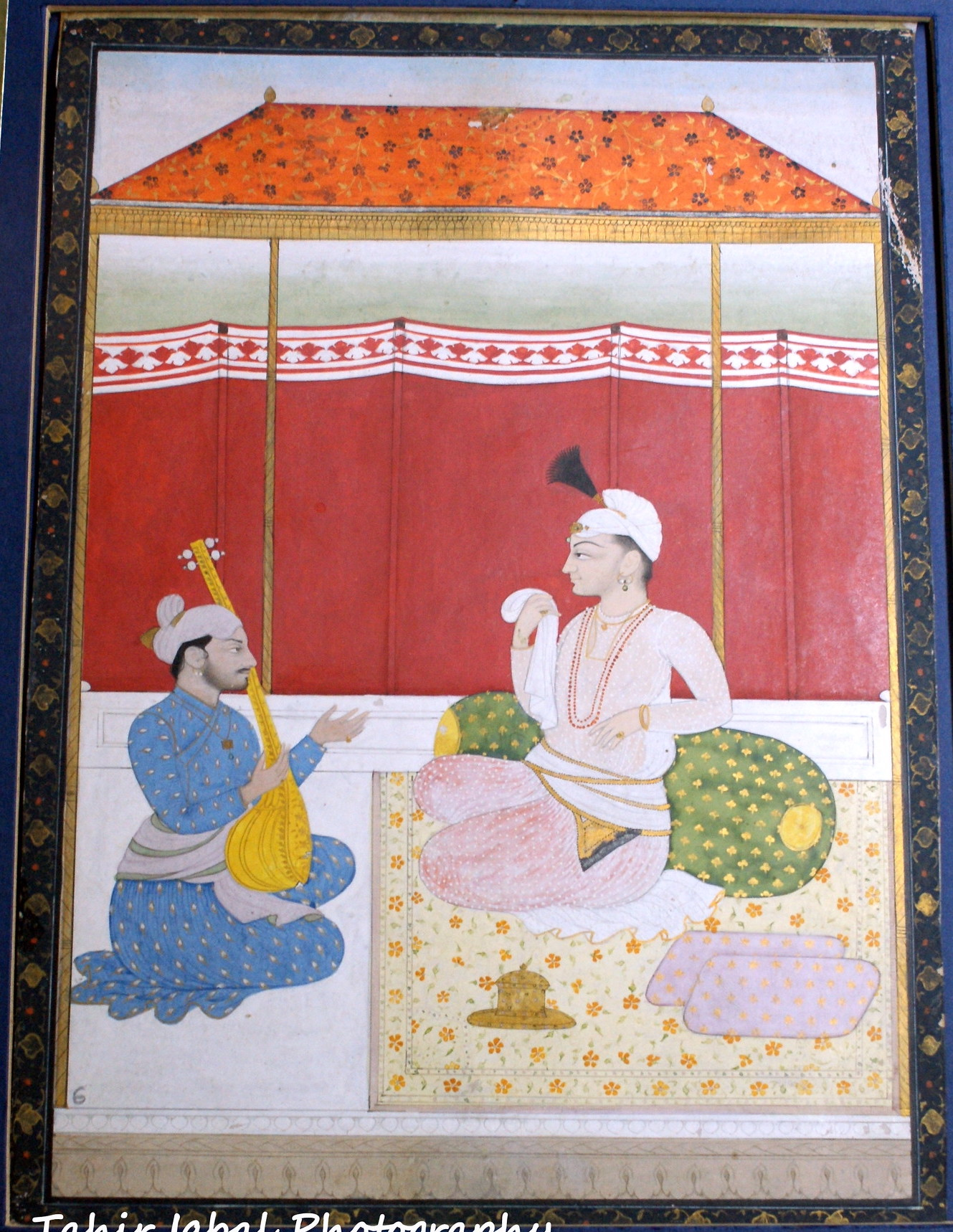
Miniature painting of Guru Har Krishan

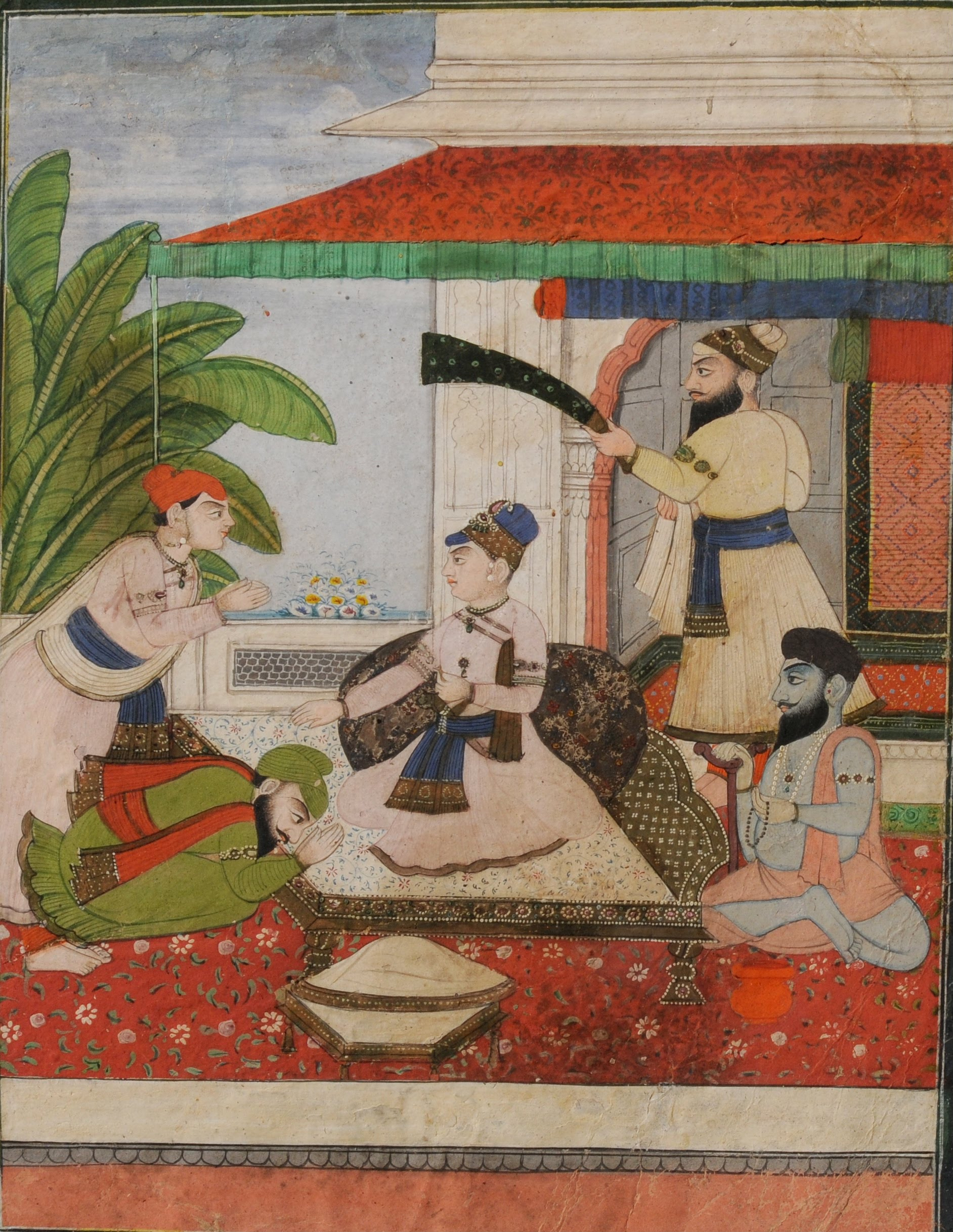
Devotees bowing to Guru Har Krishan

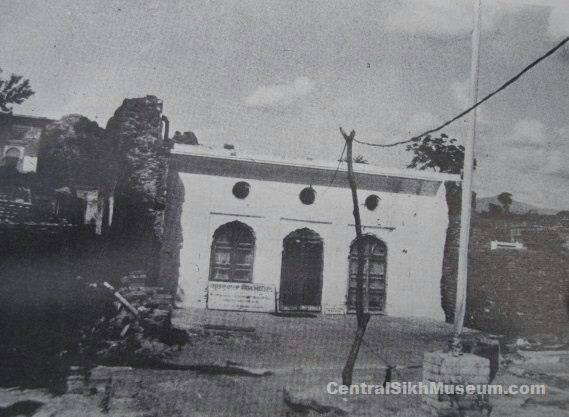
Original structure of Gurdwara Sri Sheesh Mahal Sahib, Kiratpur Sahib, birthplace of Guru Har Krishan

== See also ==
- Gurudwara Bangla Sahib

Preceded by Guru Har Rai	Sikh Guru; 6 October 1661 – 30 March 1664	Succeeded by Guru Teg Bahadur
