= Gurpranali =

Sikh literary genre

Gurpranali ("the guru's genealogy" or "chronology"), also spelt as Gurparnali, is a genre of Sikh literature that covers the genealogy of the Sikh gurus, containing information about their ancestors, relatives, and descendants. They may be written in either prose or verse. The genre arose become popularized 19th century and remained popular in the 20th century. Various Gurparnali works are known, some of which have been published. Randhir Singh published an anthology of gurpranalis in 1951. In 1964, an edition with fourteen gurpranalis was brought-out. The Gurparnalis may be contradictory with one another in their details recorded, such as in-regards to dates and marriages.

== List of gurpranalis ==
A list of notable gurpranalis is as follows:

- Amritsarī Praṇālikā
- Kesar Singh Chhibber's Gurpraṇālī (1727)
- Kavi Saundha's Gur Baṅsāvalī
- Seva Das Udasi's Gurpraṇālī (circa early 19th century)
- Gulab Singh's Gurpraṇālī (1851)
- Sant Naraiṇ Singh's Gurpraṇālī
- Giani Gian Singh's Gurpraṇālī (1866)
- Giani Sardul Singh's Gurpraṇālī (1893)
- Ram Singh's (circa late 19th century)
- Chief Khalsa Diwan's Gurvaṅs Darpaṇ Pattar (1934)
- Randhir Singh's Gurpraṇālī (1951)
