= Jigyasa University =

University in Uttarakhand, India

- Former names: Himgiri Nabh Vishvidlaya; Himgiri Zee University
- Motto: वसुधैव कुटुम्बकम्
- Type: Private
- Established: 2003 ; 22 years ago
- Affiliations: UGC
- Chairman: Dr. Subhash Chandra
- President: Dr. Irfan Khan
- Vice-Chancellor: Shankar Ramamoorthy
- Academic staff: 50+
- Undergraduates: 200+
- Postgraduates: 100+
- Location: Dehradun, Uttarakhand, India; 30°20′28″N 77°52′35″E
- Campus: Urban
- Website: Official website

Jigyasa University (formerly Himgiri Zee University) is a Private university located in Dehradun, Uttarakhand, India. It was initially established under the Uttaranchal State Act No. 17, 2003, and approved by the University Grants Commission (UGC) under Section 2(f). Following a name change to Jigyasa University, it is now established under the Uttarakhand Private University (Amendment) Act, 2024 (Act No. 5 of 2024). Located in Sherpur, Dehradun, Uttarakhand, India, the university spans a 52-acre campus. Jigyasa University is recognized by the University Grants Commission (UGC) under Section 2(f) of the 1956 Act and is a member of the Association of Indian Universities (AIU). It also holds approvals from the Pharmacy Council of India (PCI), the National Council for Teacher Education (NCTE), and the Bar Council of India (BCI).

== History ==
The university was founded by the TALEEM Research Foundation in Ahmedabad and led by Dr. Subhash Chandra,Patron of the Jigyasa University, Dehradun.

== Campus ==
The Jigyasa University campus is equipped with a library, transportation services, a canteen, medical facilities, and separate hostels for male and female students.
