= SelaQui International School =

Coordinates: 30.3707°N 77.8564°E

- Dehradun, Uttarakhand, India

Information
- School type: Independent School, [Co-educational Boarding school CBSE, CAIE Curriculum]
- Motto: Strive to lead
- Established: October 2000
- Founder: Om Pathak
- School board: Central Board of Secondary Education (CBSE)
- Headmaster: Dr. Dillip Kumar Panda
- Faculty: 54
- Grades: V to XII
- Enrollment: 342 Approx
- Student to teacher ratio: 7:1
- Campus: 52 Acres
- Houses: Six (Agni, Prithvi, Akash, Jal, Girls and Holding House)
- Colours: Orange and Green
- Publication: The SeQuin- Newsletter
- School fees: Around INR 900,000 and USD 15,000 for foreign nationals
- Uniform: Three-piece grey pin striped suit in Winters; Short-Sleeved Shirt and Trousers in Summers
- Avg. Class Size: 18-20
- Website: www.selaqui.org

SelaQui International School is a coeducational, residential school located in the village of Selaqui in the Dehradun district of Uttarakhand. It is about 20 km from Dehradun on national highway 72, connecting Dehradun with Paonta Sahib and Chandigarh. The school is affiliated with the Central Board of Secondary Education (CBSE) and is open to boys and girls from class V onward irrespective of religion, caste, and ethnicity. All students who live on campus are attached to four of the boarding houses named after elements of the earth and supervised by housemasters and matrons. The school is managed by the Gurukul trust, which appoints a board of governors headed by a chairman to oversee the school's functioning. The present chairman is Om Pathak, an ex-Indian Administrative Service officer.

== History ==
SelaQui International School was founded in October 2000 as SelaQui World School, the first International Baccalaureate (IB) school in north India, but switched to a national curriculum (CBSE) in 2013. SelaQui International School is the only boarding school in India to offer Indian Institutes of Technology (IIT) and medical college entrance exams.

=== 2020s ===
During the COVID-19 pandemic, a management team led by Rashid Sharfuddin worked to improve distance learning for students within SelaQui International School. Among these contributions was a 136-page training manual intended to aid teachers in virtual learning.

== Operations ==
=== Sports ===
SelaQui contains a psychomotor domain, which focuses on both physical fitness and motor skills. Available sports include:

- Athletics
- Table-tennis
- Horse riding
- Lawn tennis
- Swimming
- Shooting
- Badminton

== Collaborations and affiliations ==
The school is managed by Gurukul Trust, a non-profit charitable organization based in Delhi, and is affiliated with the CBSE. In 2017, SelaQui was awarded the honour of "K-12 Emerging School Brand of the Year".
