= Kipling Trail =

Walking route in India

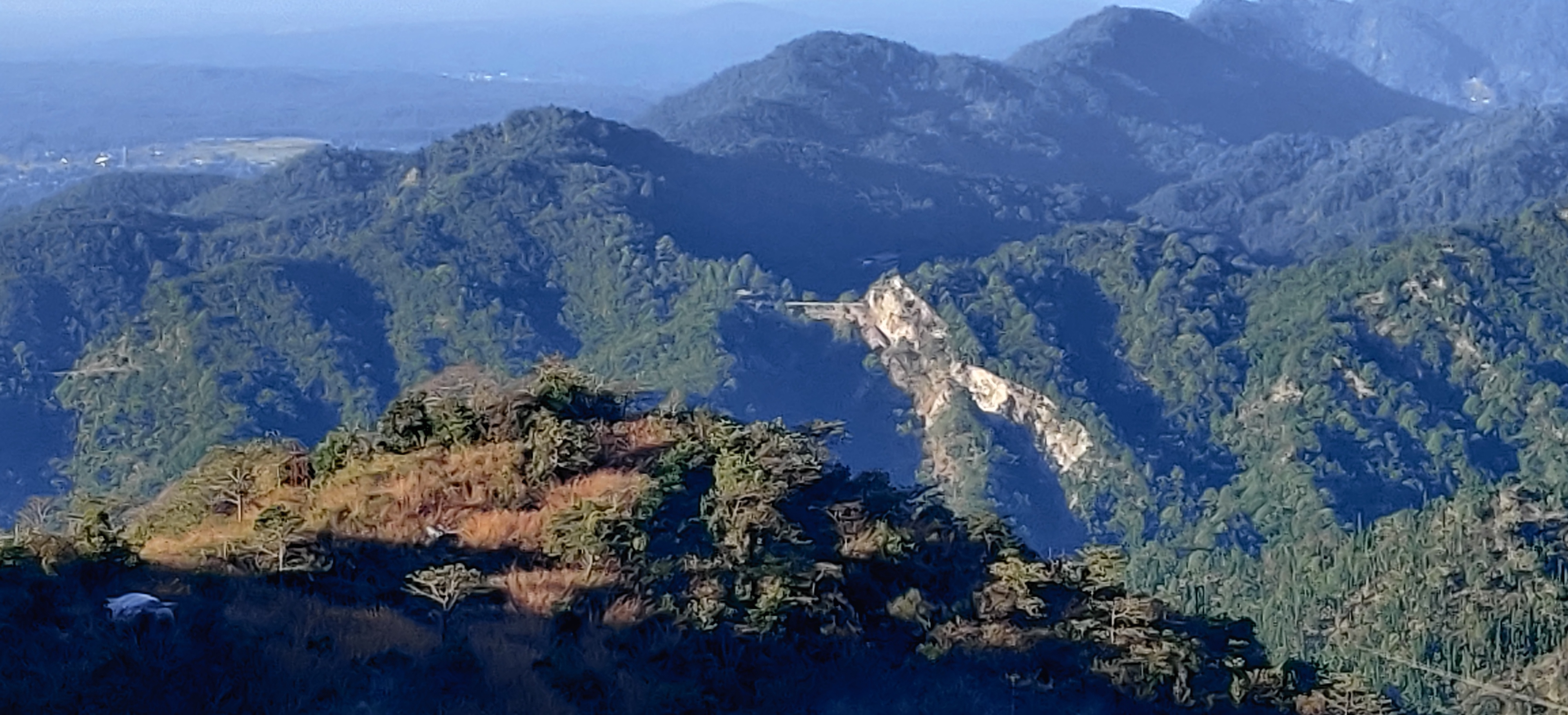
- View of the Doon Valley
- Length: 5.5 miles (8.9 km)
- Location: Uttarakhand
- Trailheads: Shahanshahi Ashram, Rajpur, Dehradun
- Use: Hiking
- Highest point: Mussoorie, 2,005 m (6,578 ft)
- Difficulty: Moderate to Strenuous
- Season: All year
- Sights: Doon Valley, diverse bird species, woodland flowers, Bougainvillea, Quercus leucotrichophora oaks
- Hazards: Steep in places with forty-degree incline

Kipling Trail (also known as Kipling Road) is the old walking route that connects Dehradun with the hill station of Mussoorie in India. It was the only means of reaching Mussoorie before the cart roads, for tongas, or roads for automobiles were constructed. It is named after the English novelist Rudyard Kipling, who is believed to have walked the trail in the 1880s, though there is no definite evidence. The trail fell out of use when cars or buses became the preferred mode of transport, but the route is being revived by nature, colonial history and hiking enthusiasts.

== History ==
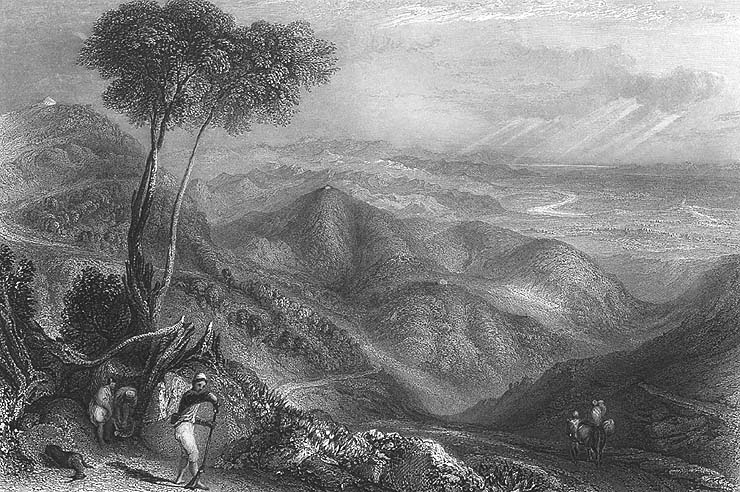
View of the Doon Valley in the 1850s.

In the 1880s, novelist Rudyard Kipling is believed to have trekked this trail and the walk described in his novel Kim is thought to have been through this route. With the construction of an asphalt road in the early 20th-century, going right up to Mussoorie, the heritage walking route gradually fell out of favour. Today, the path is being revived as it is increasingly being used by hikers and nature or history enthusiasts, who prefer walking up to the hill station over driving. In his book The Kipling Road, author Ruskin Bond explores the many stories of people who walked the old route from Rajpur to Mussoorie.

=== Route ===
The 9 km-trail takes between 2 and 3 hours to complete, and begins at Shahanshai Ashram in Rajpur village, Dehradun. It winds its way up through five steep inclines that are locally called paanch kainchi, Hindi for "five scissors". The halfway point is at Jharipani, which is surrounded by Quercus leucotrichophora or banjh oak forests. The path then leads to Barlowganj near St George's College, Mussoorie, then goes past Wynberg Allen School, finally reaching Mussoorie Library. Along the route lies an old railway tunnel, remnant of a failed project, and British-era rest houses. In 2017, parts of the trail were cemented without providing necessary outlets for drainage, and it was reported that road construction was "ruining the path's beauty". There were protests by the public, stating that vehicular traffic would harm the biodiversity along the route and change the nature of the heritage path.
