= Robber's Cave, India =

Himalayan cave

Geography of Robber's Cave
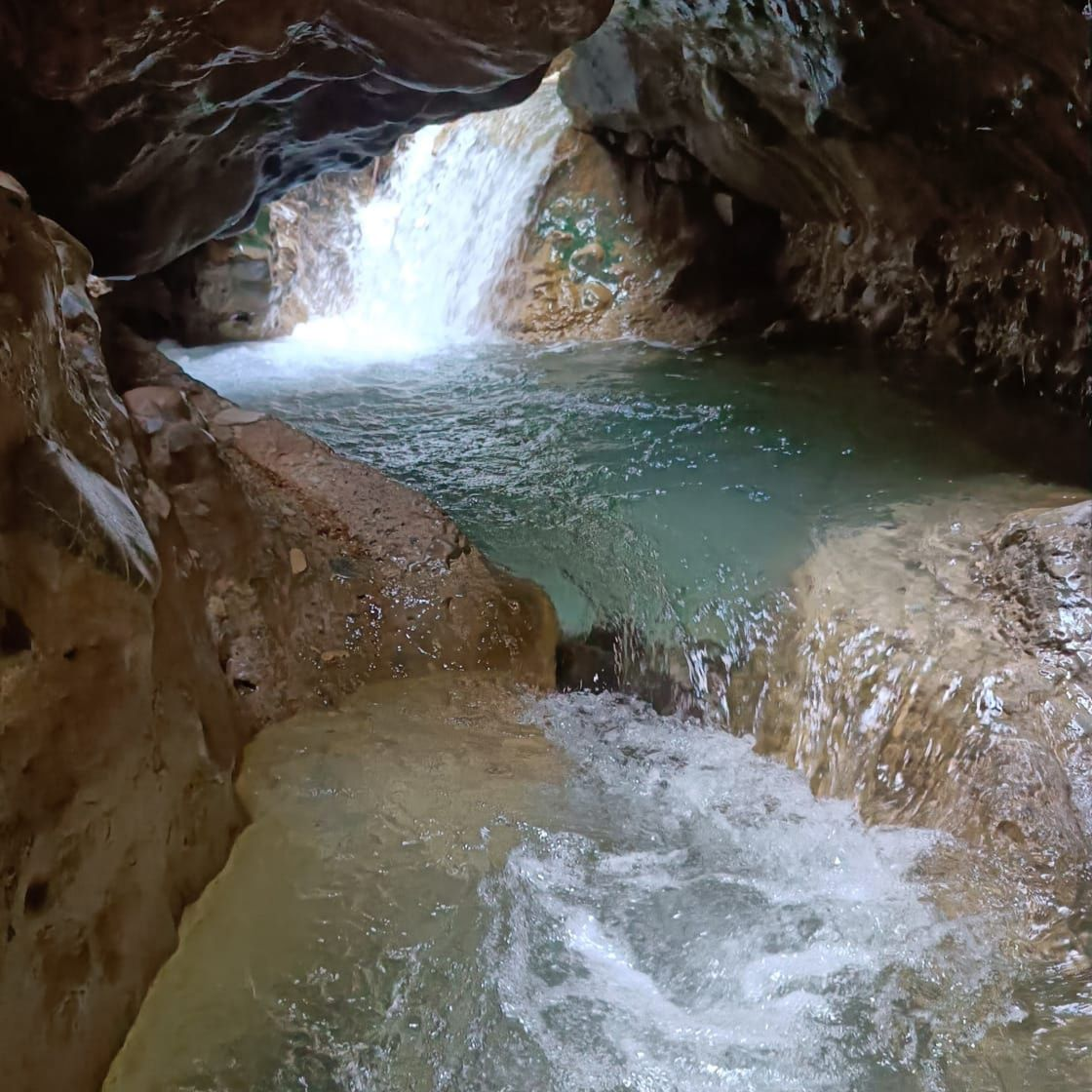
- Gucchu pani, Dehradun, river flowing inside the cave

- Location of Robber's cave in northern India
- Continent: Asia
- Region: Dehradun, India
- Coordinates: 30.3754146°N 78.059761°E

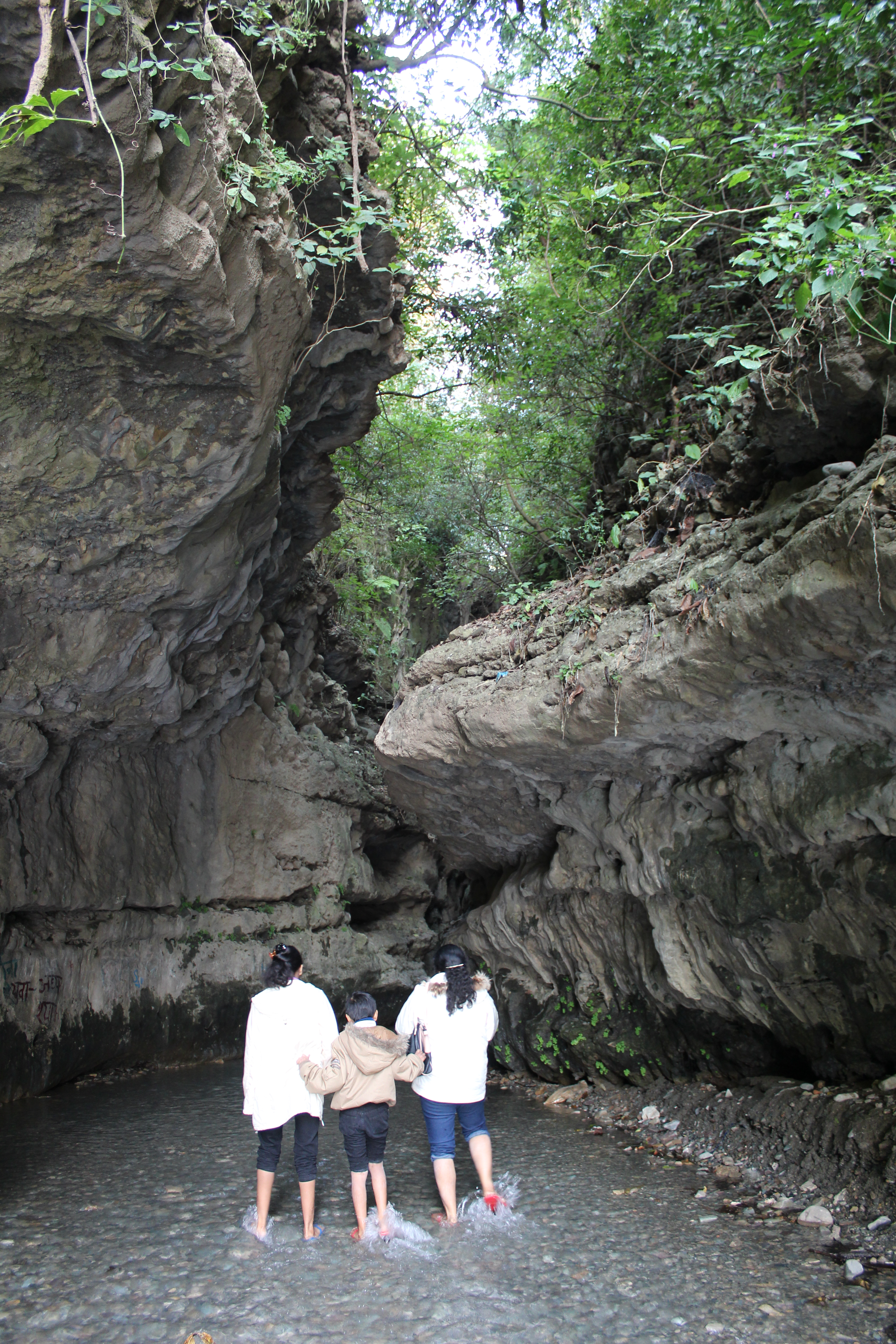
Robbers Cave

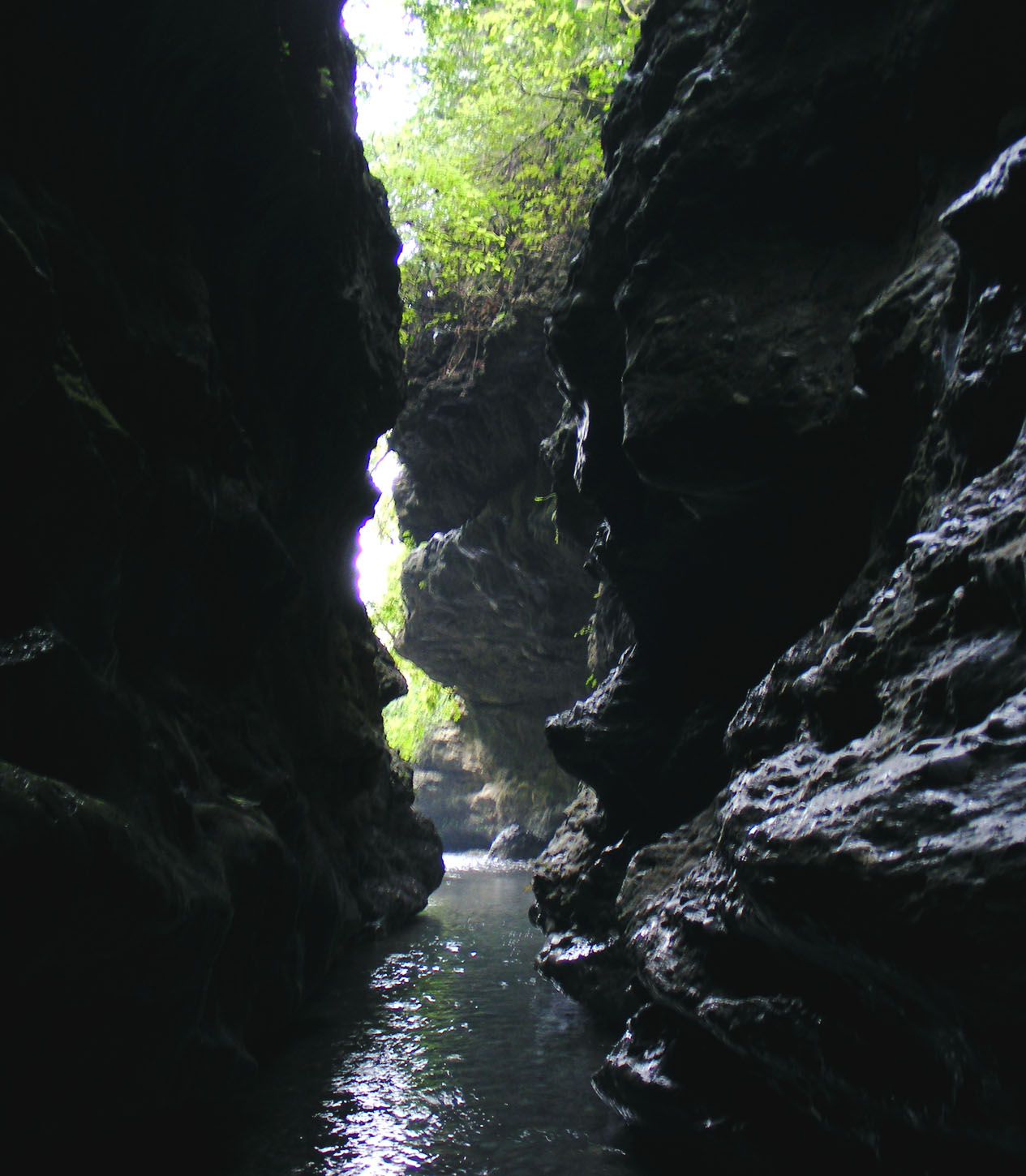
Robbers Cave and River

Robber's Cave (known locally as Guchhu pani), located near Garhi Cantt, Dehradun, is a river cave formation in the Himalayas, located approximately 8 km from the centre of Dehradun in Uttarakhand, India. The cave is about 600 metres long, and divided into two main parts. The cave has a highest fall of about 10 metres. In the central part there is a fort wall structure which is now broken. It consists of an extremely narrow gorge formed in a conglomerate limestone area on Doon Valley's Dehra plateau.

It is a natural cave formation where rivers flow inside the cave. The place is a popular tourist spot and which is now being maintained by Uttarakhand State. Local bus services are available up to Anarwala village, from where it is a kilometre's trek away.

== History ==
Robber's Cave is situated in a vast limestone area in the Dehra plateau in Dehradun. It is believed by locals that the place was used by robbers in the late 1800s to hide from the British-Indian authorities and store their loot. Labyrinth caves were suitable for robbers to hide here, which is why it came to be known as Robber's Cave.
