= St. Thomas' College, Dehradun =

St. Thomas' College
- 2, Cross Road; Dehradun; Uttarakhand 248 001, INDIA

Information
- Type: Private
- Motto: Build Ye High and Build Ye True
- Established: 1916
- Principal: Russell Valentine Gardner
- Colors: Silver and green
- Athletics: Cricket, Football, Basketball, Badminton, Athletics, Indoor Cricket, Indoor Football (Futsal), Boxing(discontinued now),
- Affiliation: CISCE (ICSE/ISC)
- Information: +91-135-2654374
- Website: www.stthomascollege.in

St. Thomas' College, Dehradun is a co-educational Indian Certificate of Secondary Education school in Dehradun, the capital of the state of Uttarakhand in India, founded in 1916. In 2016, the college celebrated its centenary year.

It is located in the heart of the city of Dehra Dun on Cross Road. The school is regarded as among the best schools in India based on its consistent results in both the 10th and 12th examinations and the magnitude of extra-curricular activities and sports in its culture.

== History ==
Prior to World War I, there were a number of civil and military officers and resident Europeans and Anglo-Indians in Dehradun. The only English school in the town at the time was the Convent of Jesus & Mary. For imparting proper education to the wards of British officials, stationed in India, a school committee was formed with the aim of forming more schools. The committee consisted of Rev. R.E. Bruce, Major G.A. Beazeley, R.E., R.S. Pearson, IFS, Lt. Gray, J.D. Maitland Kirman (honorary secretary and treasurer) and Mrs. R. Bruce.

The committee in 1915 engaged staff and rented the house – No. 52 by the Eastern Canal Road, known as "Cold Harbour" – to serve as a temporary school building. The St. Thomas' Day School was opened in January 1916 with Miss Priscilla C. Wells as headmistress, two teachers – Miss Hannah and Miss Moses – and 34 children.

Later on, an application was made to the municipal board of Dehradun, for the lease of Nazul, land and the present site of the school was maintained. Funds were arranged and the construction of the school was entrusted to Mr. Jones, district engineer of Dehradun. He designed a building, consisting of a central hall, four classrooms and a back verandah.

As the number of children on the roll increased, additional classrooms became necessary, and the U.P. Government was approached for a building grant. This could not be given except to a society, and so a school society was subsequently formed and registered with the registrar of joint stock companies – U.P. in February 1924.

Till 1947, the school taught only up to the middle school, and it was only the following year that the U.P. Government accorded the school the status of being a high school.

The institution has always been co-educational throughout the 103 years of its existence.

The same institute also has a sister concern school "St Jude's School" which was formerly established for pre-schooling and kindergarten till 2nd grade but went on to become a full-fledged senior secondary school.

== Academics ==
Initially the school was affiliated to General Certificate of Secondary Education (GCSE), A&O level. Later in the early 1960s it was affiliated to Council for the Indian School Certificate Examinations. The school conducts both the standard 10th ICSE and the standard 12th ISC examinations.

At the present moment the institution has classes from III to XII with a strength of over 2200 students, 90 teaching staff and 25 support staff. Students are allowed to take either science or commerce in the plus two stages along with computer science.

== The house system ==
Apart from academics, students are participate in co-curricular activities. Activities and competitions within the school are conducted in cohorts or "houses".

- Burn House- Blue
- Cole House- Green
- DeGruyther House - Yellow
- Fraser House - Red

Inter-house competitions in sports, debates and quizzes are held.

== See also ==
- Education in Dehradun
