= Sanjay Kaul =

Founder, Peoples Action

Former Spokesperson, Bhartiya Janta Party

Personal details
- Born: 27 March 1964 (age 62) Dehradun, Uttarakhand, India
- Spouse: Married
- Children: 1 (son)
- Website: http://sanjaykaul.wordpress.com/

Sanjay Kaul (born 27 March 1964) is an Indian political activist and has been a member of the Delhi BJP Executive Committee & spokesperson for Delhi BJP.

Armed with strong oratory & leadership skills along with a deep understanding of governance issues, Sanjay came into political limelight through demonstrated action on the ground over the course of the last decade. He began his activist career in the year 2002, when he founded People's Action.

People's Action has acted as a powerful advocacy group on a wide variety of issues affecting the common man : with a strong focus on electricity, water, housing and electoral reforms. Sanjay came into prominence in the year 2005, by confederating more than 2000 RWA's across Delhi and launching a civil disobedience movement against the tariff hike imposed by the Delhi Govt. On 1 September 2005, the Government buckled under pressure and withdrew the power hike.

He later on joined the Bharatiya Janata Party and used to actively the party point of view on various fora from 2010 till 2016.

== Public life ==
Mr. Sanjay Kaul was a former BJP Spokesperson for both national and state issues; with his primary strengths being strategy and thought leadership. Mr. Kaul worked in a professional capacity as a strategist for BJP's successful Lok Sabha election campaign in 1999, which also introduced him to politics for the first time. He led and managed the entire election war room strategies and tactics for the winning elections. He has federated a number of BJP volunteers and supporters at various levels and has infused the party with new and youthful membership. Mr. Kaul is the only politician in Delhi to have travelled across all 70 constituencies of Delhi on foot covering 400 kilometres over 23 days in 2011.

He has a formidable reputation as an opponent and is best known for leading a powerful civil society movement against the Sheila Dixit's government on the issue of the power tariff hike in 2005 and forced the Delhi government to roll back the 10% tariff hike. He is also well known for having built up an independent alliance of resident associations across Delhi to counter the erstwhile CM's controversial Bhagidari scheme. Later, he objected to and forced the Delhi government to stall the illogical BRT scheme. As well as the dangerous Blueline bus menace, resulting in the introduction of the low floor buses. Mr. Sanjay Kaul was the first to warn against wasteful CWG spending and argue for housing rights for slum residents instead, long before the scam was busted.

Kaul, by profession is an advertising, marketing and communication expert. He established People's Action, an advocacy group that works on citizen empowerment. He has a large base of supporters, which are drawn from various resident associations, market and trade associations, student groups and resettlement colony mandals. He initiated the path breaking public participation model - Resident Ward Committee [RWC] scheme in collaboration with the Municipal Corporation of Delhi to establish Committees in all wards of Delhi. With the distinction of taking this campaigns to the end, Mr. Kaul has a number of campaigns to his credit and his particular style of working and mentorship has created a number of activists and responsible citizens across the city. He is well respected for his ideas, his progressive views on civic, state and national issues. He is also the founder of the independent student group, United Students, in Delhi University.

He was the one who started the campaign against arbitrary power tariff hikes in 2005. [This held back tariff increases for three years running, until Congress came back in power in 2008.] He campaigned against water privatization demanding public consultation. [Water privatization was stalled until 2009]. He is the one who forced the Delhi cabinet to order a CAG audit of DISCOMS in 2011 after walking across Delhi and petitioning MLAs. Mr. Kaul through his RWA front, United Residents Joint Action (URJA) was the petitioner in the matter against power companies in the High Court where Mr. Prashant Bhushan represented him in the case.

In 2006, he organized residents of Gurgaon to float a political party, ‘Gurgaon Residents Party’ (GRP) to bring in clean candidature in politics. He organized the country's first primaries and helped to select a candidate through referendum for GRP. The Mohalla Sabha idea of the AAP is a direct derivative of Mr. Kaul's RWC scheme which was implemented in the MCD in 2010. He got featured in the Limca Book of Records, for the feat and was nominated by the India Today group's Today newspaper.

== Personal life ==
One of the most prominent and popular Delhi BJP leaders on social media, with over 48,000 Facebook fans and almost 20,000 Twitter followers, he is also mentioned in countless story items on the internet. He is a prominent face on TV and writes for publications. He is considered a thought leader in politics and was identified as a Future Leader in The Times of India Lead India Program in 2007.
