= Dehradun =

Winter capital of Uttarakhand, India

Dehradun Dēhrādūn (Hindi) Dehra Doon
- Winter Capital of Uttarakhand
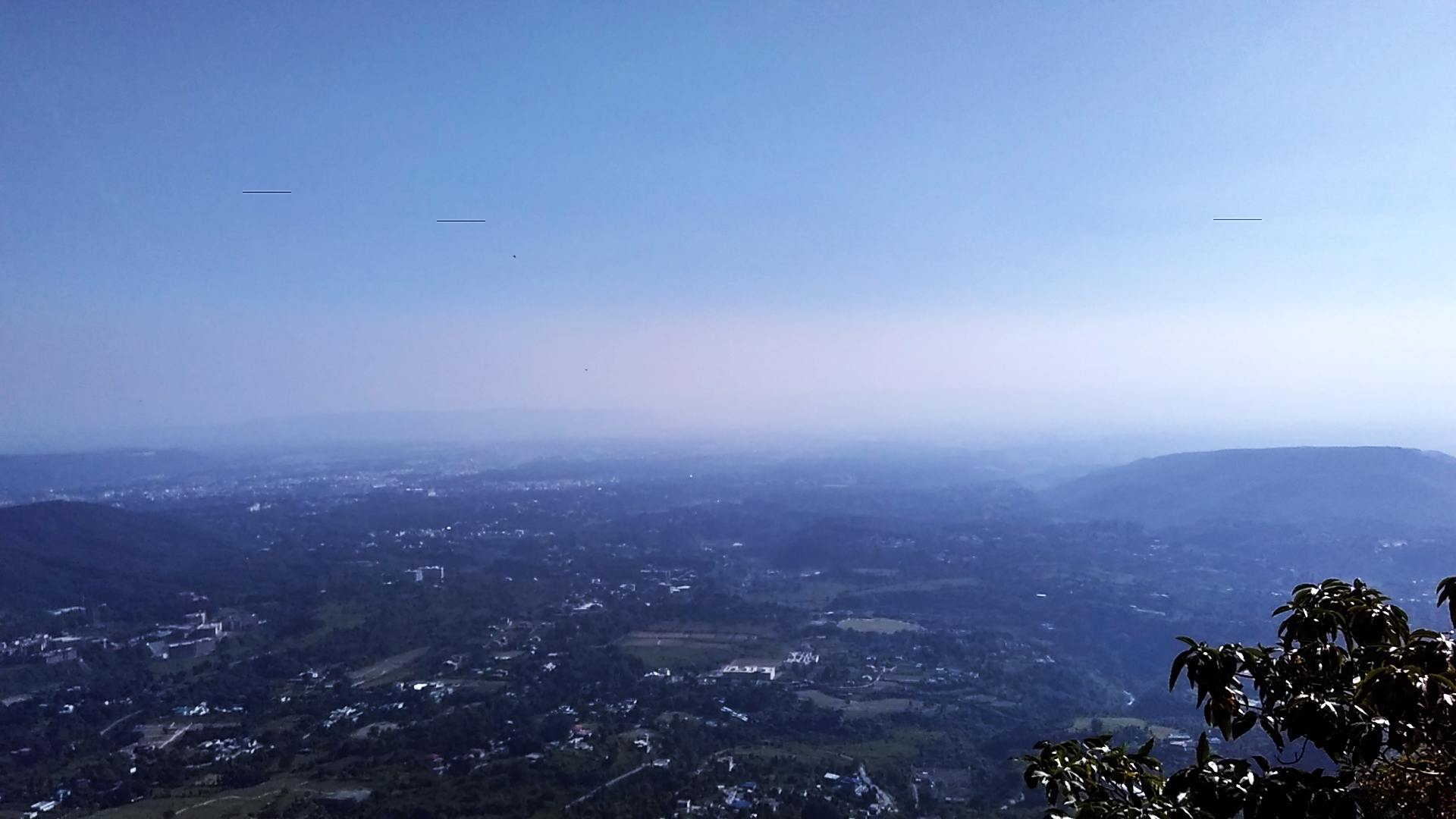
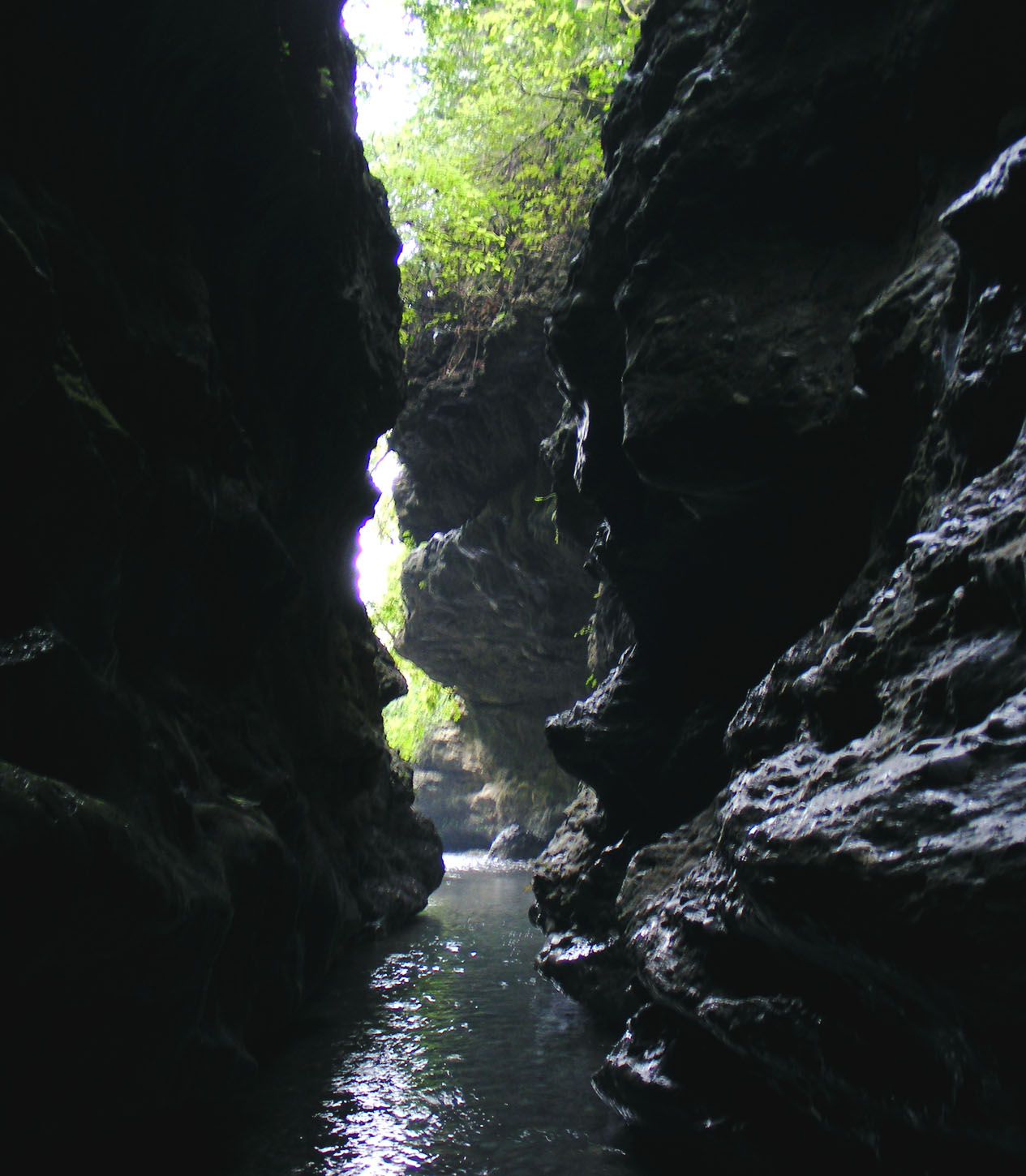
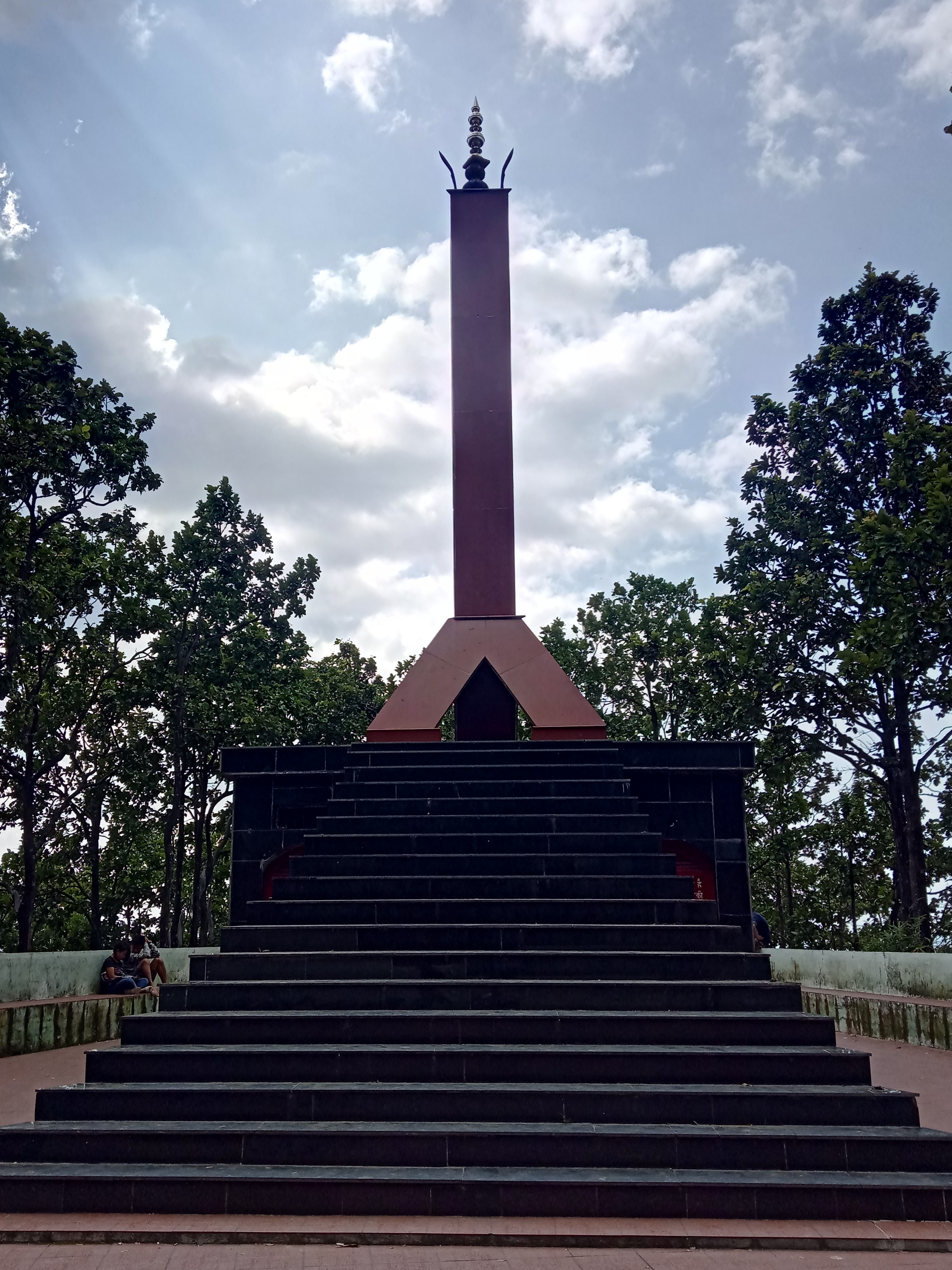
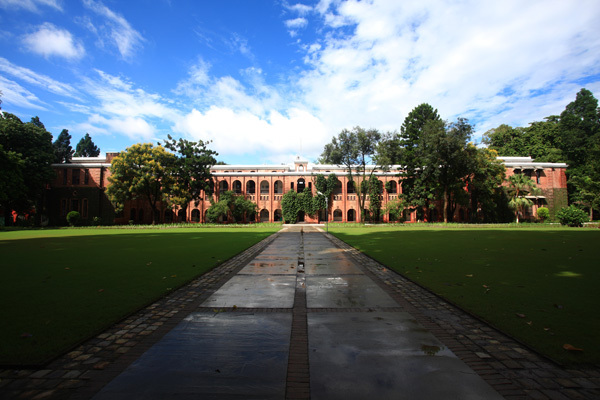
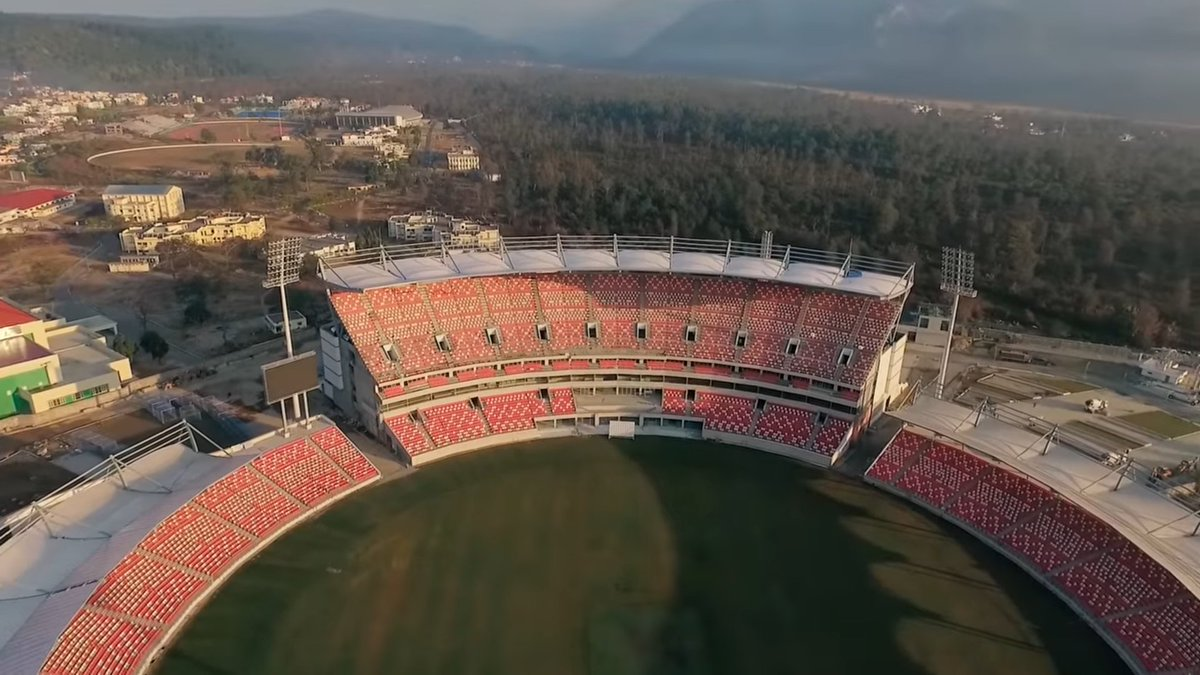
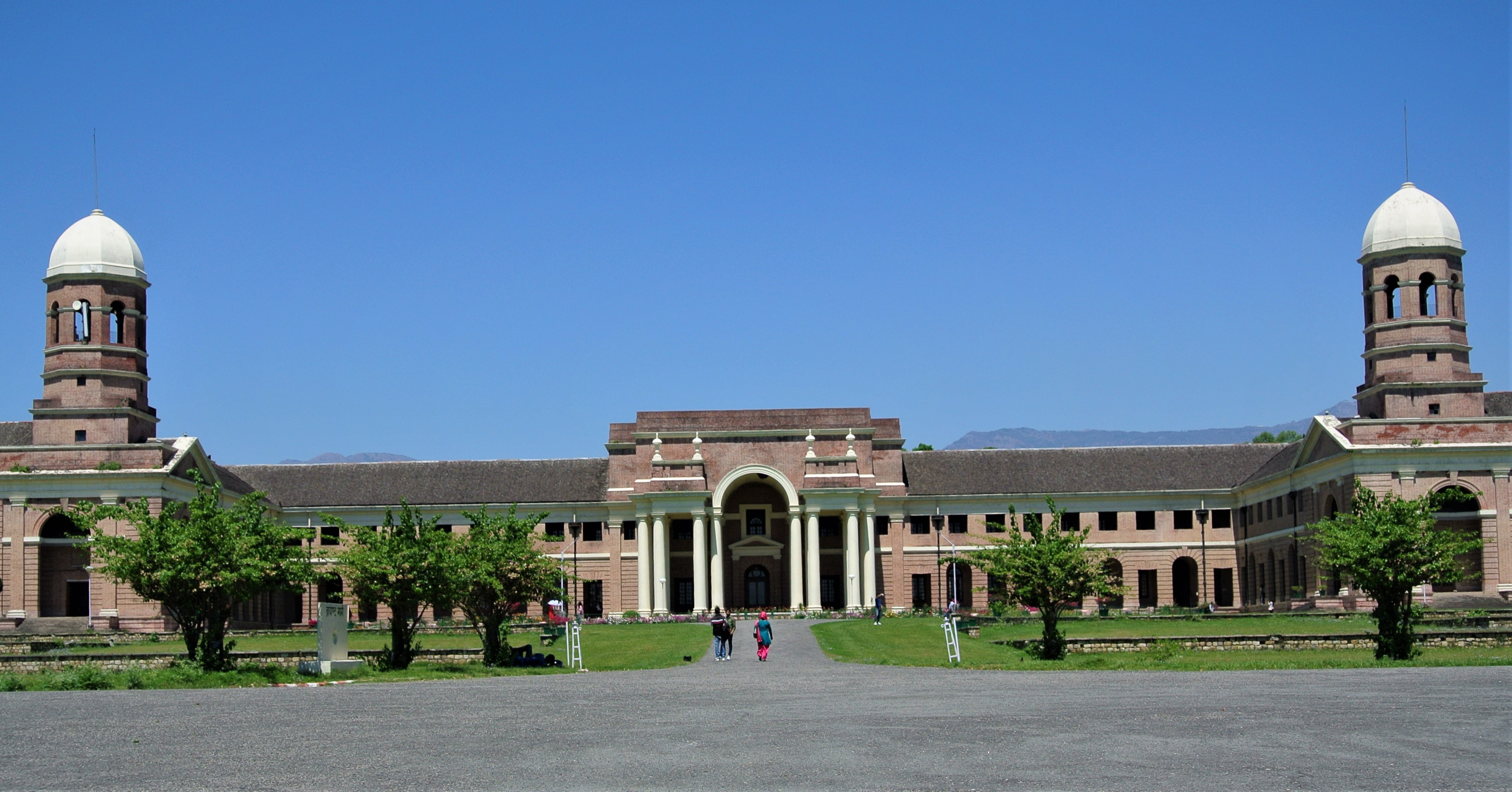
- Doon Valley Robber's Caves Khalanga War Memorial The Doon School Dehradun stadium Forest Research Institute
- Nickname: Doon
- Location within Uttarakhand Location within India
- Coordinates: 30.345°N 78.029°E
- Country: India
- State: Uttarakhand
- District: Dehradun
- Founded: 1817
- Municipality: 1867

Government
  - Type: Municipal Corporation
  - Body: Dehradun Municipal Corporation
  - Mayor: Saurabh Thapliyal (BJP)
  - Lok Sabha MP: Mala Rajya Laxmi Shah (BJP)
  - Municipal Commissioner: Manuj Goyal, IAS
  - Member of Legislative Assembly: List: Khajan Dass, BJP (Rajpur Road) Umesh Sharma, BJP (Raipur) Sahdev Singh Pundir, BJP (Sahaspur)

Area
  - City: 196.48 km^{2} (75.86 sq mi)
  - Metro: 300 km^{2} (120 sq mi)
- Elevation: 450 m (1,480 ft)

Population (2011)
  - City: 574,840
  - Rank: 79th
  - Density: 4,100/km^{2} (11,000/sq mi)
  - Metro: 706,124

Languages
  - Official: Hindi
  - Regional: Kauravi; Garhwali
- Time zone: UTC+5:30 (IST)
- PIN: 248001
- Telephone code: +91-135
- Vehicle registration: UK-07
- HDI (2016): ▲0.816 (very high)
- Website: dehradun.nic.in

Dehradun (Hindi: Dēhrādūn, pronounced [ˈd̪ɛɦɾaːd̪uːn]), also known as Dehra Doon (/ˈdɛərə ˌduːn/ DAIR-ə DOON) is the Winter capital and most populous city of the Indian state of Uttarakhand. It is the administrative headquarters of Dehradun district. Dehradun has served as the state's interim capital since the formation of Uttarakhand in 2000; Gairsain was designated the summer capital in 2020. The city lies in the Doon Valley in the foothills of the Himalayas, between the Shivalik Range to the south and the outer Himalayan ranges to the north. Dehradun has a generally temperate climate, with hot summers, cool winters and substantial monsoon rainfall.

Dehradun came under the rule of the Gorkhas in the early 19th century before being incorporated into the British-administered territories following the Anglo-Gorkha War. Under British rule, Dehradun developed as an administrative and military centre and later became part of the newly formed state of Uttarakhand in 2000. Dehradun is an important administrative, educational and research centre. It is home to institutions including the Indian Military Academy, Forest Research Institute, Rashtriya Indian Military College, Wadia Institute of Himalayan Geology and Indian Institute of Remote Sensing, as well as several prominent schools and government research and training organisations. The city also hosts the headquarters of the Survey of India and other national and state institutions.

Dehradun has a diversified service-oriented economy, with public administration, education, research, defence-related activities, healthcare, tourism and hospitality forming important components. The city also has a growing information technology and business-services sector, while traditional activities such as basmati rice production, horticulture and the manufacture of food products remain associated with the wider Dehradun area. Its role as Uttarakhand's capital and as a major educational and institutional centre has contributed to the expansion of its urban economy. The city is governed by the Dehradun Municipal Corporation and is the largest municipal corporation city in Uttarakhand. Dehradun is connected by road, rail and air to other parts of Uttarakhand and northern India and serves as an important urban centre for the surrounding Himalayan region.

== Etymology ==
Dehradun is made up of two words "dehra" + "dun." "dehra" is a Hindi word with the meaning of temple, whose etymology is: "dev" + "ghar", from Prakrit "devahara." "dūn" (or Hindi दून derives from the Sanskrit droṇī (or द्रोणि) and means "a tract of country lying at the foot of hills; a valley".

The town was established when Ram Rai, the son of the seventh Sikh Guru, Guru Har Rai built a gurudwara or temple in the area in the 17th century. Ram Rai was sent by his father as an emissary to the Mughal emperor Aurangzeb in Delhi. Aurangzeb objected to a verse in the Sikh scripture (Asa ki Var) that stated, "the clay from a Musalman (Muslim)'s grave is kneaded into potter's lump", considering it an insult to Islam. Ram Rai explained that the text was miscopied and modified it, substituting "Musalman" with "Beiman" (faithless, evil) which Aurangzeb approved.

This led Guru Har Rai to bar his son from his presence, and name his younger son as his successor. Aurangzeb responded by granting Ram Rai a jagir (land grant) in Garhwal region (Uttarakhand). The town later came to be known as Dehradun, after Dehra referring to Ram Rai's shrine. Many followers of Ram Rai, called Ramraiyas, settled with Ram Rai. Another early name for the settlement was Dera Ram Rai. During the days of British Raj, the official name of the town was Dehra. In due time the word Dehra was linked to Dun, and thus the city was named Dehradun.

In the Skanda Purana, Doon is mentioned as a part of the region called Kedarkhand, the abode of Shiva. According to Hindu mythology, in ancient India during the Mahabharata epic era, Dronacharya, the great teacher of Kauravas and Pandavas, lived here, hence the name of "Dronanagari" (lit. city of Drona).

== History ==
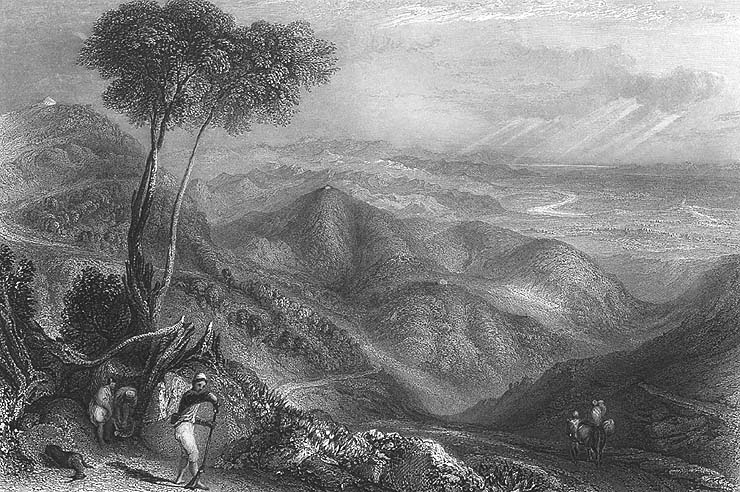
Doon Valley, Dehradun, 1850s

The history of the city of Uttarakhand, Dehradun (nicknamed "Doon Valley") is linked to the story of Ramayana and Mahabharata. It is believed that after the battle between Ravana and Rama, Rama and his brother Lakshmana visited this site. Also, known as 'Dronanagari' on the name of Dronacharya, legendary Royal guru to the Kauravas and Pandavas in the epic Mahabharata, is believed to have been born and resided in Dehradun.

Evidence such as ancient temples and idols have been found in the areas surrounding Dehradun which have been linked to the mythology of Ramayana and Mahabharata. These relics and ruins are believed to be around 2000 years old. Furthermore, the location, the local traditions and the literature reflect this region's links with the events of Mahabharata and Ramayana.

Even after the battle of Mahabharata, the Pandavas had an influence on this region as the rulers of Hastinapura with the descendants of Subahu ruled the region as subsidiaries. Likewise, Rishikesh is mentioned in the pages of history when Vishnu answered the prayers of the saints, slaughtered the demons and handed the land to the saints. The adjoining place called Chakrata has its historical impression during the time of Mahabharata.

In the seventh century, this area was known as Sudhanagara and was described by the Chinese traveller Huen Tsang. Sudhanagara later came to be recognised as Kalsi. Edicts of Ashoka have been found in the region along the banks of the river Yamuna in Kalsi indicating the wealth and importance of the region in ancient India. In the neighbouring region of Haripur, ruins were discovered from the time of King Rasala which also reflect the region's prosperity. It was under control of Garhwal for many centuries.

Dehradun was invaded by Mahmud of Ghazni during his campaigns into India followed by Timur in 1368, Rohilla chief Najib ad-Dawlah in 1757 and Ghulam Qadir in 1785.

Fateh Shah, a Garhwal king, donated three villages in Dehradun to Sikh guru Ram Rai. Before the name of Dehradun was used, the place is shown on old maps as Gurudwara (a map by Webb, 1808) or Gurudwara (a map by Gerard, 1818). Gerard's map names the place as "Dehra or Gurudwara". Surrounding this original Sikh temple were many small villages that are now the names of parts of the modern city.

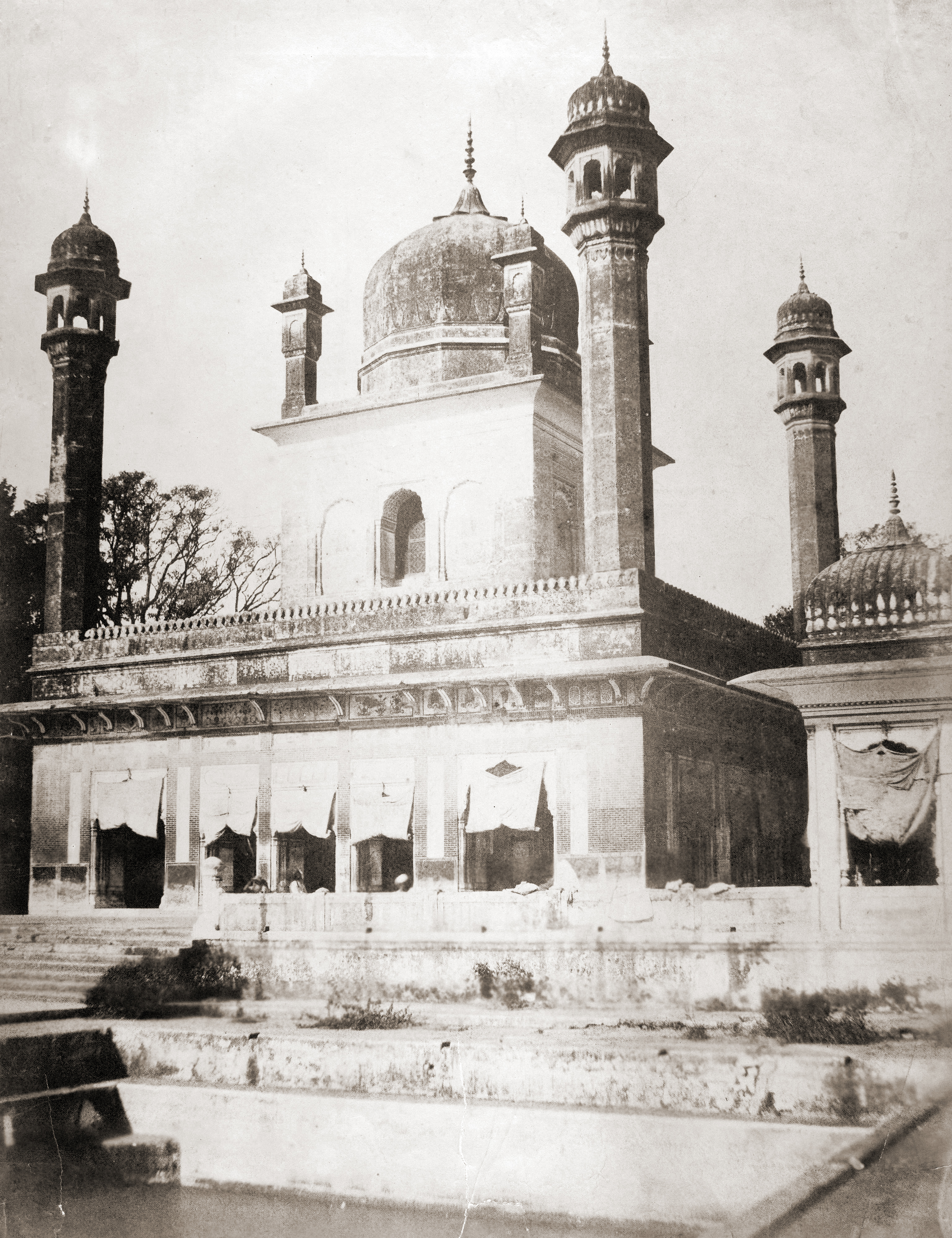
Guru Ram Rai Darbar Sahib in 1858. The construction of the present building was completed in 1707.

Dehradun itself derives its name from the historical fact that Ram Rai, the eldest son of the Seventh Sikh Guru Har Rai, set up his "Dera" (camp) in "dun" (valley) in 1676. This 'Dera Dun' later on became Dehradun.

The Mughal Emperor Aurangzeb was highly impressed by the miraculous powers of charismatic Ram Rai. He asked the contemporary Maharaja of Garhwal, Fateh Shah to extend all possible help to Ram Rai. Initially, a Gurudwara (temple) was built in Dhamawala. The construction of the present building, Guru Ram Rai Darbar Sahib, was completed in 1707. There are portraits of gods, goddesses, saints, sages and religious stories on the walls. There are pictures of flowers and leaves, animals and birds, trees, similar faces with pointed noses and big eyes on the arches which are the symbol of the colour scheme of Kangra-Guler art and Mughal art. High minarets and round pinnacles are the models of Muslimarchitecture.

The huge pond in the front measuring 230 by 80 feet (70 m × 24 m) had dried up for want of water over the years. People had been dumping rubbish; it has been renovated and revived.

In 1804 battles of Khurbura at Dehradun fought between Garhwal king Pradyuman shah and Gorakhali forces led by General Amar Singh thapa in which king Pradyuman shah died and came under control of Gorakha. In 1806 the Nepalese Commander Kaji Amar Singh Thapa under the central leadership of Prime Minister Mukhtiyar Bhimsen Thapa united many of the Indian territories that now fell under places such as Almora, Pathankot, Kumaon, Garhwal, Sirmur, Shimla, Kangra and Dehradun.

Princely flag of Kingdom of Garhwal. Dehradun was part of the princely state of Garhwal before becoming part of British India after the Anglo-Nepalese War in 1816.

On the western front Garhwal and parts of Himachal Pradesh up to Punjab and on the eastern front the state of Sikkim up to Darjeeling became parts of Nepal for a brief period until the British East India Company went to war from 1814 to 1816. The war ended with the signing of the Treaty of Sugauli where almost a third was ceded to British East India company. The British got Dehradun in 1816 and colonised Landour and Mussoorie in 1827–1828.

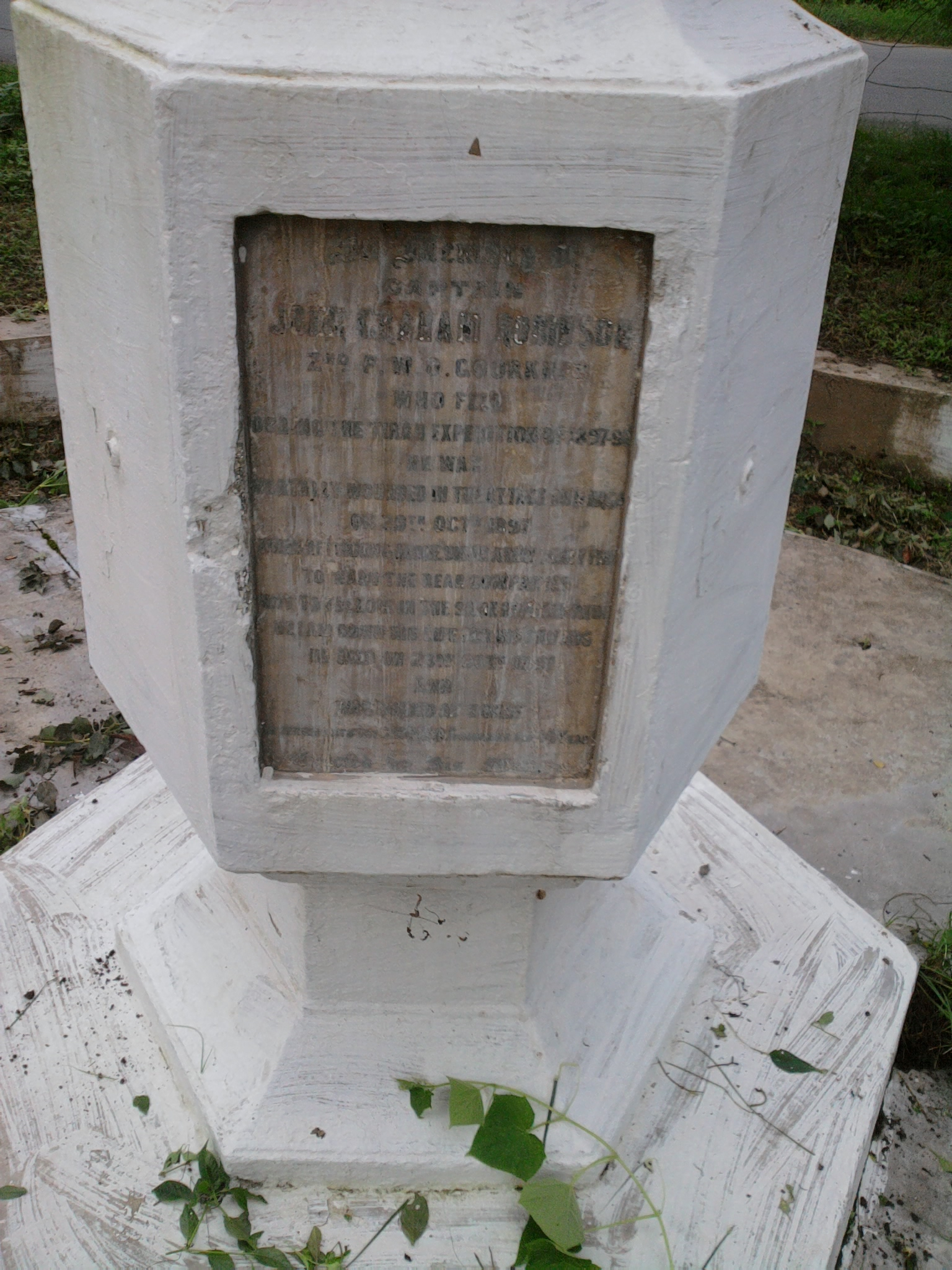
Capt John War memorial maintained by the army at Dehradun

Jawaharlal Nehru, India's first prime minister, was quite fond of the city and often visited. He spent his last few days here returning to Delhi shortly before his death in 1964. Rash Behari Bose, one of the key organisers of the Ghadar conspiracy and, later, the Indian National Army was based in Dehradun in his early days before he was forced to move to Japan in 1915 to continue the freedom struggle.

Post-independence Dehradun (part of the United Provinces of Agra and Oudh) was merged with three other princely states and made part of United Provinces which was later renamed the state of Uttar Pradesh. In 2000, Uttarakhand state (Named Uttaranchal till 2008) was created from the northwestern districts of Uttar Pradesh under the Uttar Pradesh Reorganisation Act, 2000. Dehradun was made its interim capital.

=== Afghan connection ===
Dehradun's Afghan connection dated back to the First Anglo-Afghan War, after which the Afghan Emir Dost Mohammad Khan was exiled by the British to Dehradun. He stayed in Mussoorie for over 6 years. The Balahissar ward under the Mussoorie municipality has been named after the palace of Dost Mohammad. The famous Dehradooni Basmati was brought along by him from Kunar Province in Afghanistan and it continues to be counted as a delicacy of the valley.

According to Dehradun historian and heritage activist Lokesh Ohri, "Dost Mohammad Khan was fond of pulao and missed it during his exile. He brought Basmati rice to the Doon valley and is credited with improving its genetic variety. His grandson Yaqub Khan gave Basmati seeds to a Paltan Bazaar trader and asked him to cultivate them in Dehradun. Surprisingly, the Doon valley's weather suited the rice and it turned out even better than the variety in Afghanistan."

Forty years later, after the Second Anglo-Afghan War, his grandson, Mohammad Yaqub Khan, was sent to exile to India in 1879. Just like his grandfather, he chose Doon valley as his abode. Yakoob became the first Afghan to formally settle in Dehradun. The present Mangla Devi Inter College was once the Kabul Palace where Yakoob spent a few years of his life. The extended family and servants of the King were also relocated to Dehradun.

The Afghan royal family maintained a presence in Dehra Dun. It was the birthplace of the second to last King of Afghanistan, Mohammed Nadir Shah. Two quaint palaces – the Kabul Palace in Dehradun and Bala Hissar Palace in Mussoorie – stand testimony to this connection with Afghanistan. They were built by these Afghan rulers in exile in India in the early part of the 20th Century and are palaces are a miniature replica of the palatial structures owned by the kings in Afghanistan. The Bala Hissar Palace has now been turned into Mussoorie's Wynberg Allen School. Doon-based heritage enthusiast Ghanshyam told the Times of India, "The police station at Karanpur used to be the royal guard room of Yakoob way back in 1879. The electrical office located at the Survey Chowk was the royal servants quarter."

Today the descendants of the former royalty, Yakub Khan and his grandson Sardar Azim Khan's family have integrated with the mainstream of Dehradun life. The Doon connection was revived when Zahir Shah, the last king of Afghanistan while undergoing treatment in New Delhi during the last years of his life expressed a desire to meet his Doon cousins but the meeting could not take place as the family members were away. Ashraf Ghani, former President of Afghanistan has mentioned that his grandmother grew up in Dehra Dun. "I speak of Tagore because I was raised on Tagore by my grandmother who lived in Dehradun...," Dr Ghani said while talking about India's vision and the remarkable transformation. Dehradun is also being selected to be the second "home" ground of the Afghan cricket team. and Afghan cricket fans recall this "centuries old link" with the town.

== Geography ==
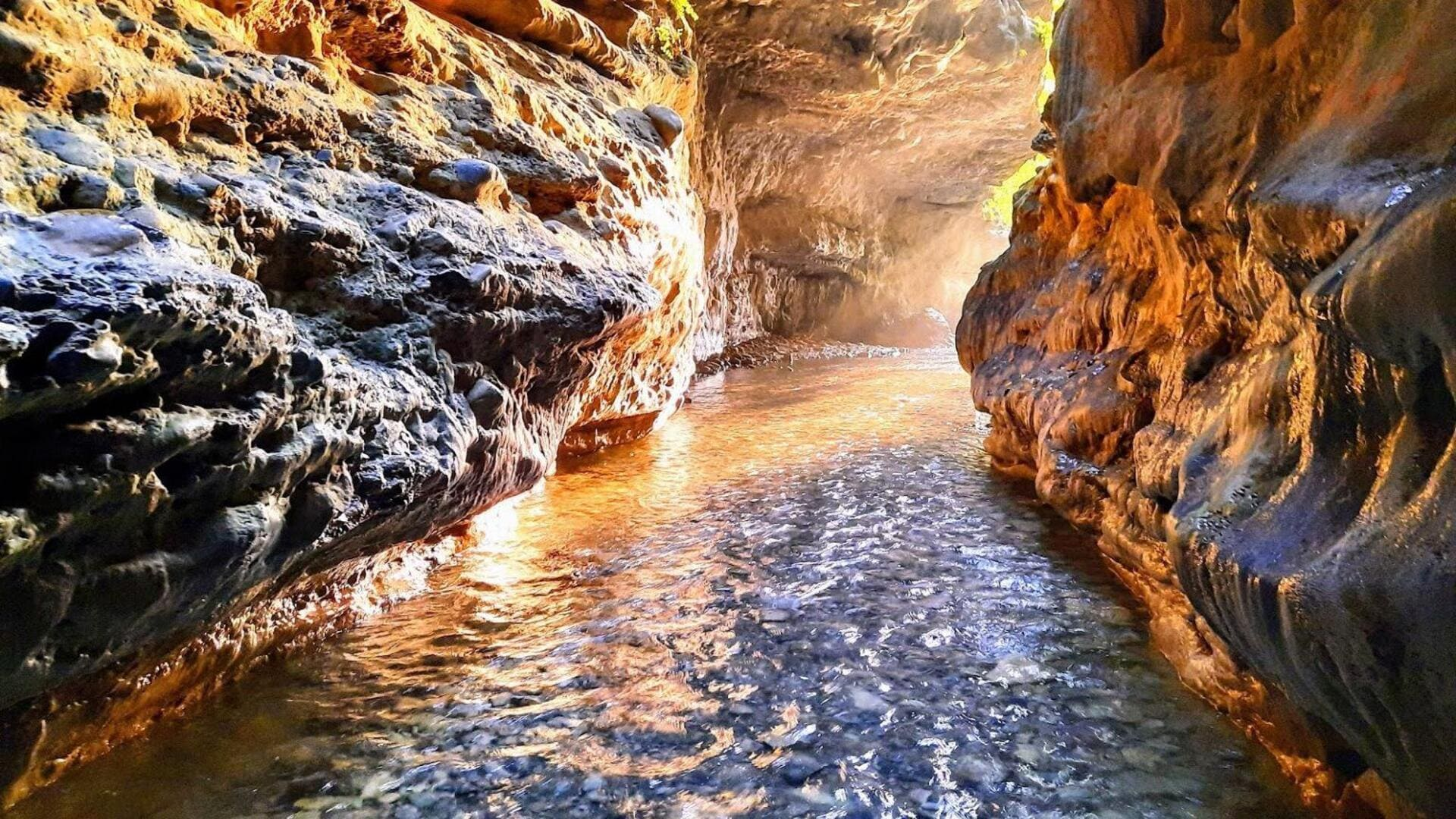
A View from within Robber Cave

Dehradun is located in the Doon Valley, a valley in the foothills of the Himalayas in northern Uttarakhand. The city lies between the Shivalik Range to the south and the Himalayan foothills to the north. Much of the urban area occupies relatively level terrain on the valley floor, while the surrounding landscape rises towards the Shivaliks and the Himalayan foothills. The central part of Dehradun lies at an elevation of approximately 435–450 metres above sea level. The physical geography of the city and its surroundings is influenced by the geology and geomorphology of the Doon Valley, which contains extensive deposits of gravel, sand and other alluvial material derived from the surrounding mountains. To the north, the terrain rises towards the Mussoorie and Lesser Himalayan ranges, while the Shivaliks extend along the southern margin of the valley.

Since the city lies in a natural trough between the Himalayas and the Shivalik Hills, its surroundings form a watershed drained by multiple seasonal and perennial watercourses. The Rispana and Bindal are among the principal watercourses flowing through the urban area, generally towards the south. Other significant watercourses include the Asan, Song, Tons and Suswa. The Asan drains the western part of the valley towards the Yamuna river system, while the Song and Suswa are part of the drainage towards the Ganges. Several of these watercourses have a strongly seasonal flow regime. During the monsoon, heavy rainfall produces substantial increases in stream discharge, while urban development has increased the city's exposure to localised flooding.

=== Heritage canal network ===
Dehradun's agricultural landscape was historically served by a network of irrigation canals that diverted water from streams descending from the surrounding hills. The Rajpur Canal, constructed in the 17th century, was among the earliest canals in the area and formed part of an irrigation system used for agriculture in the Doon Valley, including the cultivation of paddy and basmati rice. The canal network also contributed to the traditional management and distribution of water in the valley.

Urban development has substantially altered the canal network. Following the expansion of Dehradun, particularly after the city became the capital of Uttarakhand in 2000, several canals were covered, modified or removed to accommodate roads and other development. Remnants of the network survive in parts of the city and its outskirts. The Rispana, Bindal and other natural drainage channels have also been affected by encroachment, pollution and changes associated with urban development.

=== Climate ===
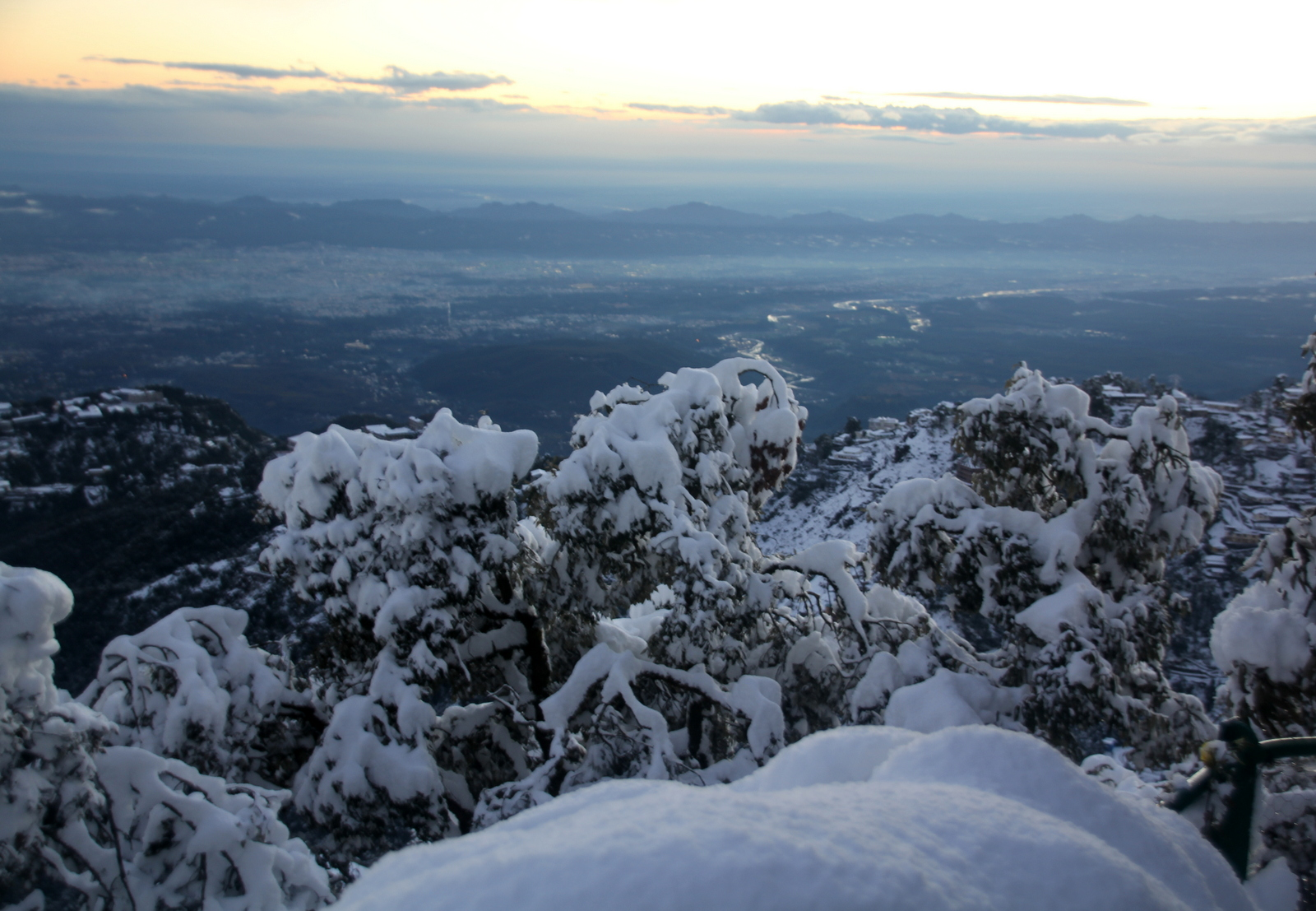
Distant view of Dehradun and the surrounding areas of the Doon Valley from snow-covered Landour in winter

Dehradun has a continental climate influenced by its distance from the sea, location in the Doon Valley, and proximity to the Himalayas, resulting in seasonal variations in temperature and precipitation and the prevalence of continental air during much of the year. Under the Köppen climate classification, Dehradun has a humid subtropical climate (Cwa), characterised by hot summers, relatively dry winters and substantial monsoon rainfall. Temperatures generally begin to rise in March and are highest in May and June, when they can reach around 40 °C (104 °F). Winters are comparatively cool, with temperatures generally ranging from about 6 °C (43 °F) to 20 °C (68 °F); December and January are typically the coldest months. Diurnal temperature variation in Dehradun is about 9 °C (48 °F) during the winter season, with the lowest temperatures generally occurring around 07:00 IST and a rapid increase during the morning, followed by a gradual rise until about 15:00 IST. Temperatures remain around 3 °C (37 °F) lower throughout the day in January, the coldest month, than during the second half of February, the warmest period of the season.

Relative humidity remains high during the winter season, with maximum relative humidity rising from about 80 per cent in early December to 87 per cent in mid-January before declining to around 70 per cent by the end of February. Minimum relative humidity follows a similar seasonal pattern, increasing slightly in early winter before declining by about 20 per cent towards the end of February. Fog generally forms when night-time temperatures fall following the passage of a western disturbance, which can increase moisture through rainfall. The subsequent cooling brings near-surface air to saturation, favouring fog formation. Dehradun experiences relatively light winds during winter, with northeast winds predominating in the morning and west to west-northwest winds in the evening. Typical wind speeds range from about 1.8 to 3.6 km/h, while calm conditions are most frequent in December and least frequent in February.

Dehradun receives an average annual rainfall of about 2,073.3 mm (81.63 in), most of which occurs during the southwest monsoon between June and September. July and August are generally the wettest months. Rainfall during the remainder of the year is considerably lower, although winter precipitation can occur in association with western disturbances. Heavy monsoon rainfall can occasionally cause flooding and other water-related hazards, particularly in low-lying or poorly drained areas.

Climate data for Dehradun (1991–2020, extremes 1901–present)
Month	Jan	Feb	Mar	Apr	May	Jun	Jul	Aug	Sep	Oct	Nov	Dec	Year
Record high °C (°F)	28.6 (83.5)	31.2 (88.2)	37.2 (99.0)	40.8 (105.4)	43.1 (109.6)	43.9 (111.0)	40.6 (105.1)	37.2 (99.0)	36.6 (97.9)	36.1 (97.0)	31.0 (87.8)	28.7 (83.7)	43.9 (111.0)
Mean daily maximum °C (°F)	19.7 (67.5)	22.5 (72.5)	27.4 (81.3)	32.5 (90.5)	35.3 (95.5)	34.1 (93.4)	30.6 (87.1)	30.1 (86.2)	30.1 (86.2)	29.0 (84.2)	25.5 (77.9)	21.7 (71.1)	28.2 (82.8)
Daily mean °C (°F)	12.7 (54.9)	15.6 (60.1)	20.1 (68.2)	25.2 (77.4)	28.4 (83.1)	28.6 (83.5)	26.9 (80.4)	26.5 (79.7)	25.5 (77.9)	22.8 (73.0)	18.4 (65.1)	14.4 (57.9)	22.1 (71.8)
Mean daily minimum °C (°F)	6.6 (43.9)	9.2 (48.6)	13.1 (55.6)	17.4 (63.3)	21.2 (70.2)	23.2 (73.8)	23.6 (74.5)	23.1 (73.6)	21.3 (70.3)	16.3 (61.3)	11.4 (52.5)	7.6 (45.7)	16.1 (61.0)
Record low °C (°F)	−1.1 (30.0)	−1.1 (30.0)	2.2 (36.0)	7.2 (45.0)	11.4 (52.5)	13.1 (55.6)	12.8 (55.0)	12.4 (54.3)	12.8 (55.0)	8.4 (47.1)	2.8 (37.0)	0.0 (32.0)	−1.1 (30.0)
Average rainfall mm (inches)	43.5 (1.71)	57.9 (2.28)	45.8 (1.80)	32.9 (1.30)	51.4 (2.02)	231.1 (9.10)	621.6 (24.47)	714.9 (28.15)	305.9 (12.04)	38.3 (1.51)	5.2 (0.20)	13.0 (0.51)	2,161.5 (85.10)
Average rainy days	2.8	3.8	3.2	2.7	3.8	10.3	20.5	21.6	12.0	2.1	0.4	1.1	84.1
Average relative humidity (%) (at 17:30 IST)	66	56	45	35	37	55	79	83	77	66	68	69	62
Source 1: India Meteorological Department
Source 2: Tokyo Climate Center (mean temperatures 1991–2020)

== Demographics ==
Historical population
Year	Pop.	±%
1901	30,995	—
1911	42,568	+37.3%
1921	50,858	+19.5%
1931	43,206	−15.0%
1941	59,535	+37.8%
1951	116,404	+95.5%
1961	126,918	+9.0%
1971	166,073	+30.9%
1981	211,416	+27.3%
1991	283,537	+34.1%
2001	426,674	+50.5%
2011	574,840	+34.7%
Source: Census of India

Religion in Dehradun (2011)
Hinduism	82.53%
Islam	11.75%
Sikhism	3.50%
Christianity	1.06%
Jainism	0.63%
Others (incl.unclassified and religion not stated)	0.54%

Languages of Dehradun Tehsil (2011)
1. Hindi (64.2%)
2. Garhwali (17.6%)
3. Punjabi (4.40%)
4. Nepali (3.96%)
5. Urdu (3.73%)
6. Kumaoni (1.54%)
7. Others (4.61%)

According to the Government of Uttarakhand, the estimate population of Dehradun is 1696,694, comprising 804,495 males and 892199 females. The sex ratio was 908 females per 1,000 males, lower than the national average. Children under the age of six numbered 80,180, including 50,600 boys and 29,580 girls, giving a child sex ratio of approximately 585 girls per 1,000 boys. The city had a literacy rate of 88.42 per cent, with male literacy at 91.81 per cent and female literacy at 84.7 per cent. There were 463,791 literate residents, comprising 251,832 males and 211,959 females.

Dehradun has a diverse population, shaped in part by migration from different parts of Uttarakhand and other parts of India. People from the hill districts of Uttarakhand form a significant component of the city's population, alongside communities originating from the plains and neighbouring states. The city's role as the capital of Uttarakhand, together with its educational, military, administrative and research institutions, has contributed to continued migration and population growth. Urban expansion has also incorporated formerly rural settlements and agricultural land into the built-up area. Dehradun and its outgrowths have a total of 32,861 slums, with a combined population of 158,542. This accounts for approximately 27.58% of the total population of 574,840 in the city and its outgrowths.

Hindi is the principal language spoken in Dehradun and is widely used in administration, education and public life. Other languages spoken in the city include Garhwali, Nepali, Punjabi, Urdu and Kumaoni, as well as Bhojpuri, Bengali and languages associated with communities from other parts of India. The city has a religiously diverse population, with Hinduism forming the majority religion. Hindus constituted approximately 82.5 per cent of the population in the 2011 Census, followed by Muslims at about 11.8 per cent and Sikhs at approximately 3.5 per cent. Christians, and Buddhists constituted smaller proportions, along with people identifying with other religions or no particular religion.

== Administration ==
Dehradun is the administrative headquarters of Dehradun district and the Garhwal division of Uttarakhand. The divisional administration is headed by the Divisional Commissioner, while the district administration is headed by the District Magistrate and Collector and supported by additional district magistrates, the City Magistrate and sub-divisional magistrates. Since the formation of Uttarakhand in 2000, Dehradun has served as the state's principal administrative centre and seat of government, hosting the offices of the Chief Minister, Chief Secretary and various government departments. The Uttarakhand Legislative Assembly has its principal seat in Dehradun and also holds sessions at Bhararisain near Gairsain, the state's designated summer capital. The city's electoral representation is organised through constituencies whose boundaries do not necessarily correspond to the municipal limits. The city's electoral representation is divided among several constituencies of the Uttarakhand Legislative Assembly, while its parliamentary constituencies encompass areas extending beyond the city.

=== Local government ===
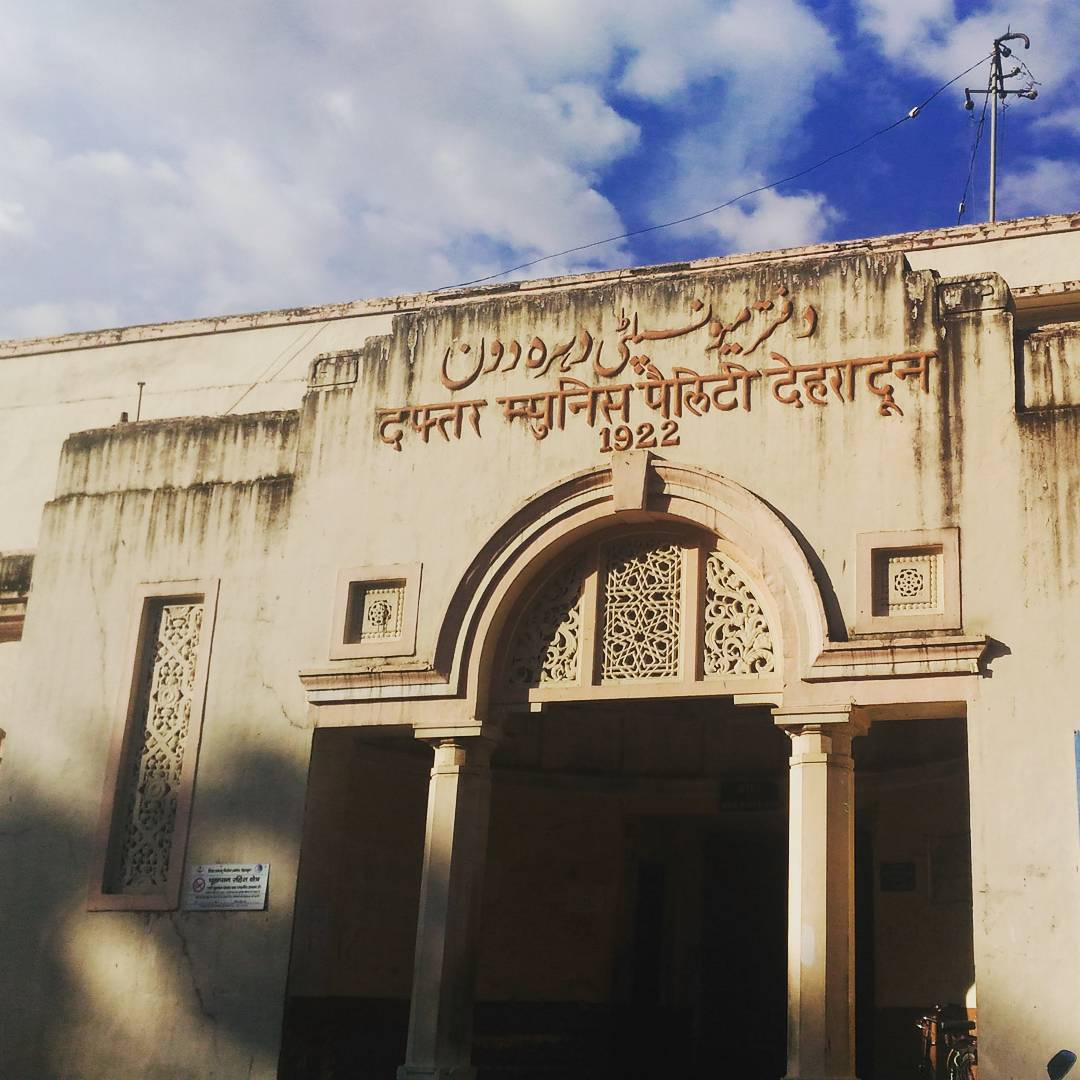
Dehradun Municipal Corporation headquarters, the seat of the city's local government

Dehradun Municipal Corporation (DMC) is the local government responsible for civic administration and municipal services within the city in the city. Its functions include urban planning and development, sanitation, waste management, public health, roads and other civic infrastructure. The corporation operates within the wider administrative framework of Dehradun district and Uttarakhand. The municipal body originated as the Dehradun Municipal Council and was converted into a municipal corporation following the expansion and reorganisation of the municipality. In 2017, 72 adjoining villages were incorporated into the corporation's limits, increasing the number of wards from 60 to 100. The corporation is headed by a directly elected mayor, while its executive administration is headed by the municipal commissioner. Several other agencies share responsibility for urban development and civic infrastructure in Dehradun. The Mussoorie Dehradun Development Authority (MDDA) oversees aspects of urban planning and development, while Jal Sansthan and Jal Nigam are responsible for aspects of water supply and related infrastructure.

For the 2026–27 financial year, the Dehradun Municipal Corporation approved a budget of approximately ₹363 crore. In fiscal year 2023–24, the Dehradun Municipal Corporation reported revenue of ₹196.49 crore and expenditure of ₹193.76 crore; 56.6% of its revenue came from government grants, while 43.4% came from its own sources, including property taxes and user charges.

== Civic utilities ==
The city's water supply is derived from surface water and groundwater sources, including springs, canals, rivers and tube wells. Sources have included the Kaulu Khet spring, Maussifall, the Bindal River and the Bijapur Canal, supplemented by groundwater extraction. Urbanisation and groundwater extraction have placed pressure on local water resources, while changes in groundwater recharge have affected groundwater levels in parts of the urban area. The Rispana and Bindal rivers have been affected by urban pollution, including the discharge of municipal wastewater and household sewage through drains. Inadequate sewerage coverage, untreated wastewater and solid-waste disposal have contributed to deterioration in water quality. The two rivers subsequently join the Suswa–Song drainage system, carrying pollution from the urban area downstream.

The Dehradun Municipal Corporation is responsible for municipal solid-waste management, including its collection, transportation and disposal. The city's waste is processed at the Shishambara solid-waste processing facility on its outskirts, which replaced the former dumping site on Sahastradhara Road. Sewerage services in Dehradun are operated and maintained by the Uttarakhand Jal Sansthan, with additional infrastructure developed through urban-improvement programmes. The sewerage network does not cover the entire built-up area, and some neighbourhoods rely on septic tanks and other on-site sanitation systems.

Electricity in Dehradun is regulated through the Uttarakhand Power Corporation Limited (UPCL), while Fire services are handled by the Uttarakhand Fire and Emergency Services. State-owned Bharat Sanchar Nigam Limited, or BSNL, as well as private enterprises, among them Vodafone, Bharti Airtel, Reliance, Idea Cellular, and Tata Teleservices are the leading telephone and cell phone service providers in the city.

=== Healthcare ===
Dehradun has a mix of public and private healthcare facilities providing primary, secondary and tertiary. Major institutions include Government Doon Medical College and Hospital, Shri Mahant Indiresh Hospital, and Max Super Speciality Hospital. The city also has specialised and Ayurvedic healthcare facilities and is an important centre for medical education and research, with Government Doon Medical College and several private medical institutions.

Dehradun serves patients from across Uttarakhand, particularly from the hill districts where access to specialised and tertiary healthcare is more limited. In spite of having special status under the National Health Mission, Dehradun is facing a healthcare crisis due to the shortage of medical manpower in the state and financial constraints. Hospitals and medical centres in the Dehradun are plagued by non-functioning equipment in the operating theatre and the insufficient number of labour rooms.

== Education ==
SelaQui International School– Illustrating the Residential School model

Dehradun is an educational and research centre in Uttarakhand, with schools, universities, professional institutions and national research organisations. Schools in the city include government, aided and private institutions, most of which are affiliated with the Central Board of Secondary Education (CBSE) or the Council for the Indian School Certificate Examinations (CISCE). Other schools follow the Uttarakhand Board of School Education or international curricula, including Cambridge (CIE) and the International Baccalaureate (IB). Hindi and English are the principal languages of instruction. The Uttarakhand Board of School Education, headquartered in Ramnagar, administers the state's school examinations and prescribes the curriculum for schools affiliated with it.

Dehradun has several residential schools, including The Doon School, Welham Boys' School, Welham Girls' School, Rashtriya Indian Military College, Ecole Globale International Girls' School, SelaQui International School and Cambrian Hall. Other schools include St. Joseph's Academy, St. Thomas' College and Colonel Brown Cambridge School. The city also has Kendriya Vidyalayas and schools operated by the armed forces and other public institutions. The National Institute for the Empowerment of Persons with Visual Disabilities (NIEPVD), based in Dehradun, provides education, training, rehabilitation and other support services for persons with visual disabilities; it was the first institution of its kind in India and established the country's first Braille press.

=== Higher education and research ===
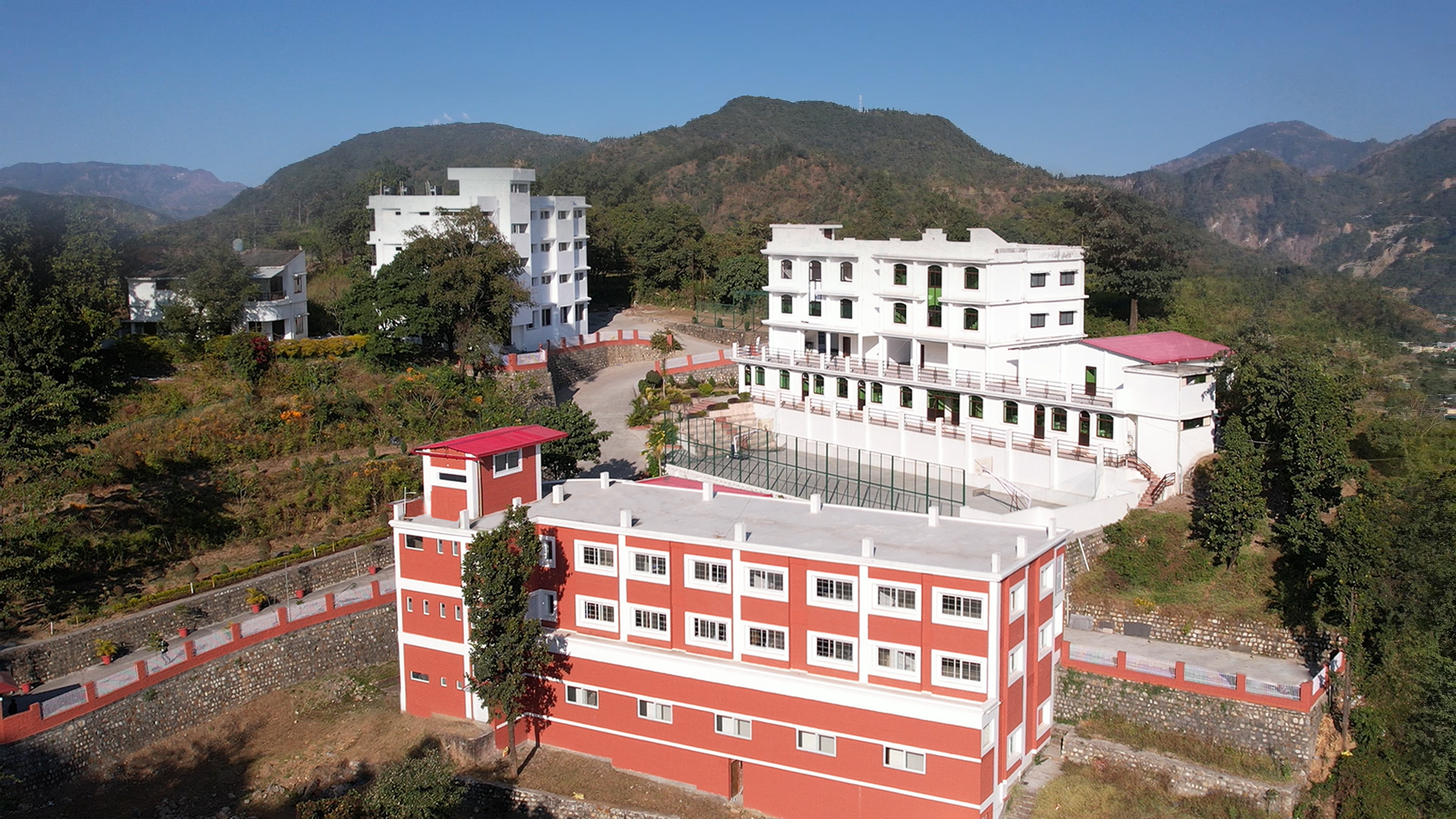
Himalayan Institute of Technology– campus view

Dehradun has several universities and higher-education institutions, including Doon University, Graphic Era University, Uttaranchal University, Jigyasa University and the University of Petroleum and Energy Studies, as well as institutions specialising in medicine, technology and other professional disciplines. The city has a concentration of institutions concerned with forestry, environmental science and related fields. The Forest Research Institute (FRI), established in 1906, provides education and research in forestry. Its campus also houses the Indira Gandhi National Forest Academy, which provides professional training to officers of the Indian Forest Service. The Wildlife Institute of India (WII), Wadia Institute of Himalayan Geology and Indian Institute of Remote Sensing (IIRS) are also based in Dehradun and conduct work in fields including wildlife science, Himalayan geology and remote sensing.

Dehradun's other research institutions include the Indian Institute of Petroleum (IIP), which conducts research and development in petroleum refining, fuels and related technologies, and the Instruments Research and Development Establishment (IRDE), which conducts research and development in defence technologies. The city also has institutions for medical education, including Government Doon Medical College, Shri Guru Ram Rai Institute of Medical & Health Sciences and the Himalayan Institute of Medical Sciences at Swami Rama Himalayan University. The National Institute for the Empowerment of Persons with Visual Disabilities provides education, training and rehabilitation services for persons with visual disabilities.

== Economy ==
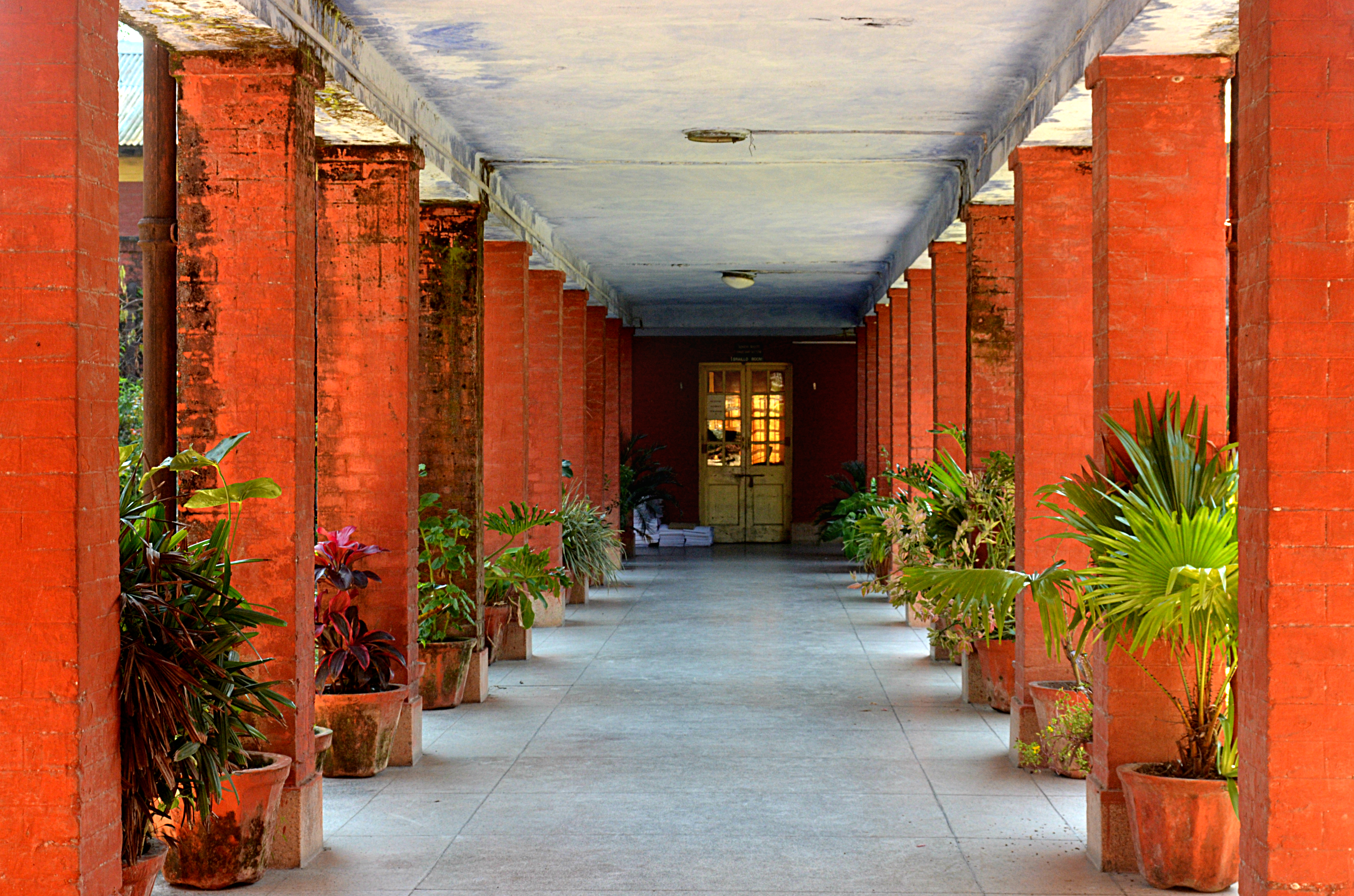
Central Braille Press, Dehradun – the first Braille press of India

Dehradun has a concentration of educational and research institutions, with employment in education, scientific research and service-sector related services. Information technology and information technology-enabled services form part of Dehradun's service economy. Software Technology Parks of India (STPI) established a centre in 2001, with facilities including the STPI centre at Survey Chowk and the IT Park on Sahastradhara Road. The facilities provide infrastructure and services for information-technology enterprises and software development. Dehradun also has Special Economic Zones (SEZs) for information technology and information technology-enabled services. An IT/ITES SEZ was established on Sahastradhara Road, while another was notified in areas including Dhoran Khas, Danda Dhoran and Gugrada Man Singhwala.

The service economy includes retail and wholesale trade, hospitality, transport, real estate and professional services. Dehradun serves as a commercial centre for surrounding areas of the Doon Valley and parts of Uttarakhand, including the hill districts. Tourism and hospitality are also part of the city's economy, supported by its location near the Himalayan foothills and its role as a base for travel to destinations in Uttarakhand.

Major defence production establishments include the Ordnance Factory Dehradun, the Opto Electronics Factory of the Ordnance Factories Board, Defence Electronics Application Laboratory and Instruments Research and Development Establishment of the Defence Research and Development Organisation which manufactures products for the Indian Armed Forces. Many of these are located in the Raipur area. The Ordnance Factory estate is located in the middle of the mountains.

== Transport ==
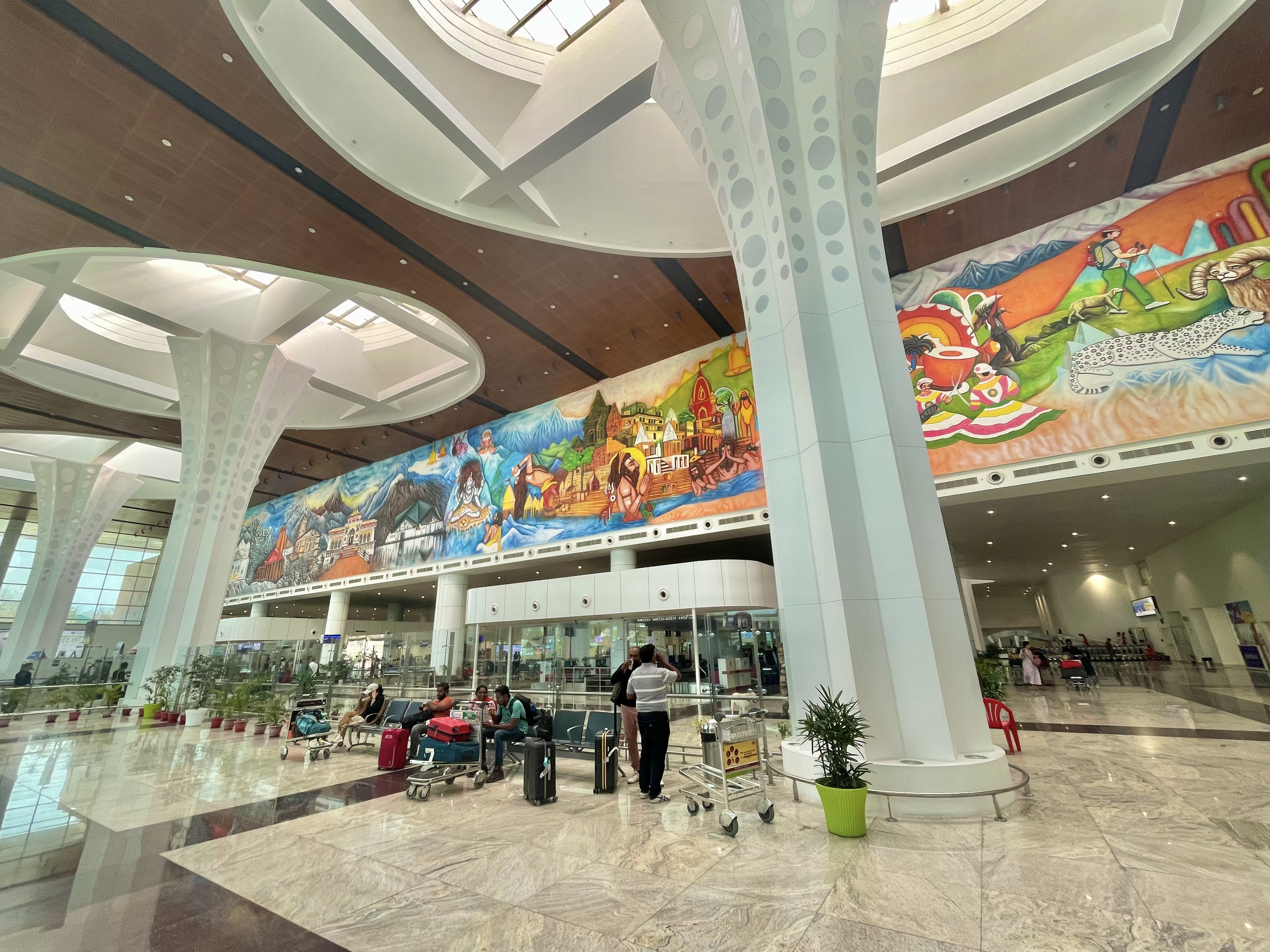
Departure and arrival area of the terminal building, Dehradun Airport

Dehradun is served by Jolly Grant Airport, officially known as Dehradun Airport (IATA: DED; ICAO: VIDN), about 20 km southeast of the city in Doiwala. Commercial operations began in 2008 following an extension of the runway, and a new passenger terminal was inaugurated in 2021. The airport provides scheduled domestic services to several major Indian cities and serves Dehradun and the surrounding region. Expansion has been proposed to accommodate increasing passenger traffic, with environmental concerns raised in relation to the airport's proximity to the forested Thano area. Helicopter services also connect Dehradun with destinations including Chinyalisaur and Gauchar in Uttarakhand.

Dehradun railway station is the city's principal railway station and a terminal station of the Northern Railway. Established in 1899 during British rule, it provides rail connections to Delhi, Mumbai, Lucknow, Howrah and other cities in India. The station is located near the centre of the city.

Dehradun is connected by road with cities and towns in Uttarakhand and neighbouring states. National Highway 7 connects the city with Rishikesh and areas of the Himalayan region, while National Highway 307 provides a connection towards Saharanpur and other parts of northern India. Major roads within the city include Rajpur Road, Chakrata Road, Saharanpur Road and Haridwar Road. The Delhi–Dehradun Expressway, opened in 2025, provides a direct road connection between Dehradun and Delhi. The Uttarakhand Transport Corporation operates bus services from Dehradun to destinations in Uttarakhand and neighbouring states. The Inter State Bus Terminal (ISBT) is the principal hub for intercity bus services. Local public transport includes city buses, auto-rickshaws, shared three-wheelers and other passenger vehicles. Electric bus services were introduced in the city in 2022.

== Culture ==
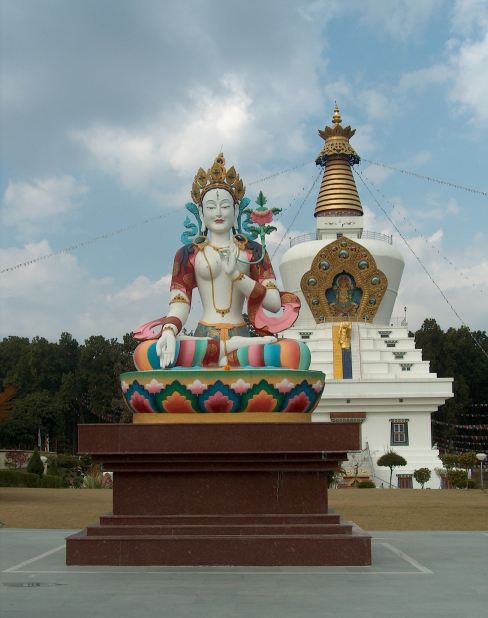
Statue of Tara and Great Stupa Dehra Dun

Dehradun was home to freedom fighters whose names are engraved in gold on the Clock Tower. It was called "The city of grey hair and green hedges" because ex-Army officers and VIPs considered this place ideal for residence after retirement.

After becoming the capital, there has been continuous growth in education, communication and transport. As the state capital, Dehradun is home to many government institutions.

City buses are identified with blue bars. There are auto rickshaw which are often used for transportation but blamed for pollution and noise. The evening buzz of Rajpur road is an attraction. The city centre is easily recognised by the Clock tower (Ghanta Ghar), a structure with four functioning clocks. The statue of San Dijen placed in Shanti Niketan contributes to the beauty of the city. Dehradun has been home to artists and writers including Stephen Alter, Nayantara Sahgal, Allan Sealy, Ruskin Bond and also to country singer Bobby Cash.

There are fairs (melas) throughout the year which is in trend with the hills of Uttarakhand where festivals were marked by the organisation of various melas. Notable fairs include Magh Mela, held on 14 January and Jhanda Mela in March, is celebrated as the birthday of Ram Rai, the eldest son of the seventh Guru of the Sikhs, Har Rai. A massive banner (jhanda) is raised during this fair to commemorate his arrival in the Doon Valley on this very day in 1733. The Jhanda Fair is observed on the fifth day of chaitra, which also falls five days after Holi. It is held in Guru Ram Rai Darbar Sahib in Jhanda Bazaar.

=== Tourism ===
Tourist destinations include the Dehradun Zoo, Buddha Temple, Kalanga Monument, Chandrabani, Himalayan Gallery cum Regional Science Centre Guchhupani, Forest Research Institute, Uttara Museum of Contemporary Art, Tapovan, Lakshman Siddha Peeth, Tapkeshwar Temple, Santala Devi Temple, Mindrolling Monastery, Prakasheshwar Mahadev Temple, Sai Mandir, Central Braille Press and Wadia Institute of Himalayan Geology.

The tourist destinations can be divided into four or five areas: nature, sports, sanctuary, museums and institutions. The nearby hill stations are well known for their natural environment, temples for its faith dimensions, sanctuary for animal and bird lovers. Hill stations include Mussoorie, Sahastradhara, Chakrata, and Dakpathar. Famous temples include Tapkeshwar, Lakhamandal and Santala Devi.

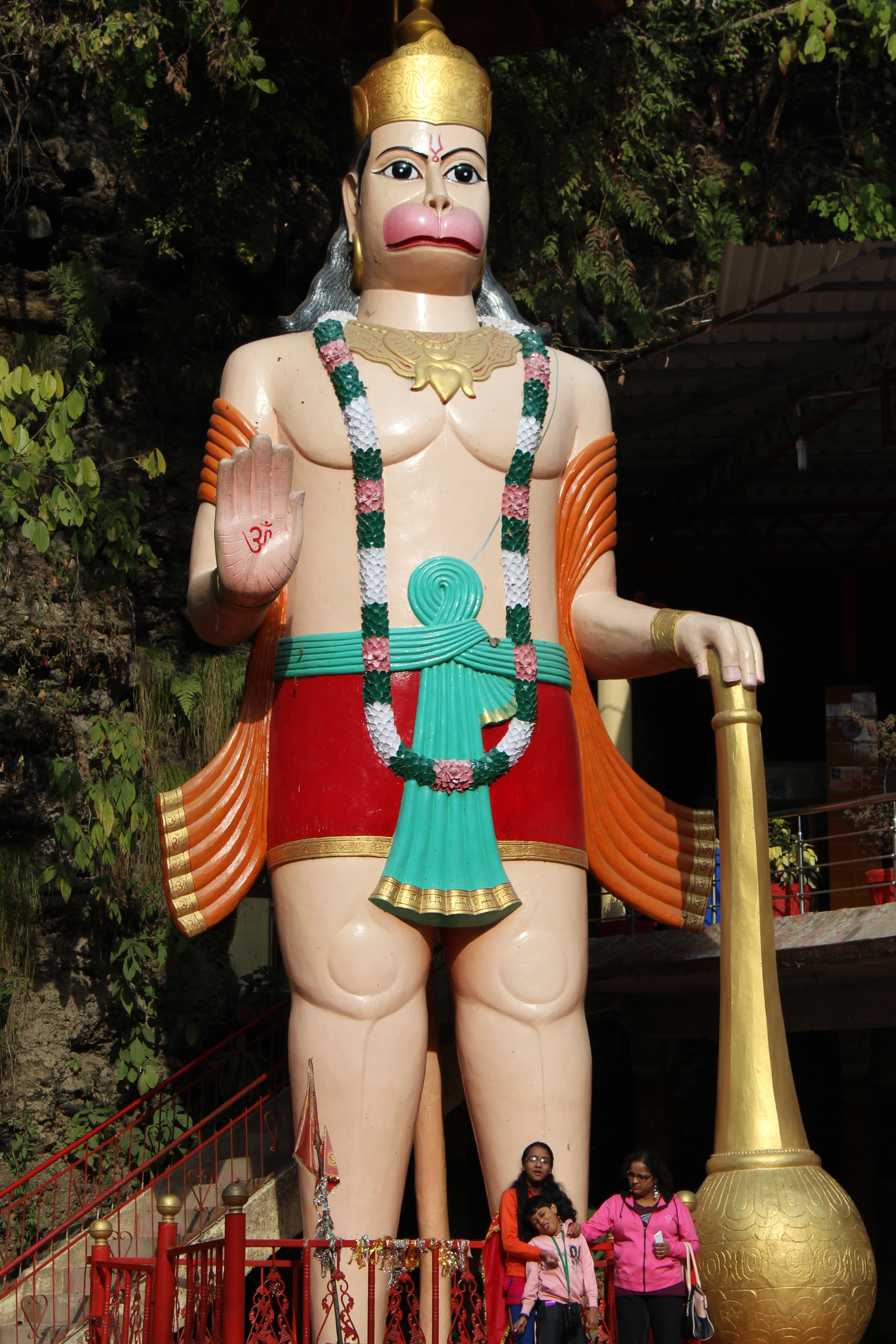
Hanuman Idol at Tapkeshwar Temple

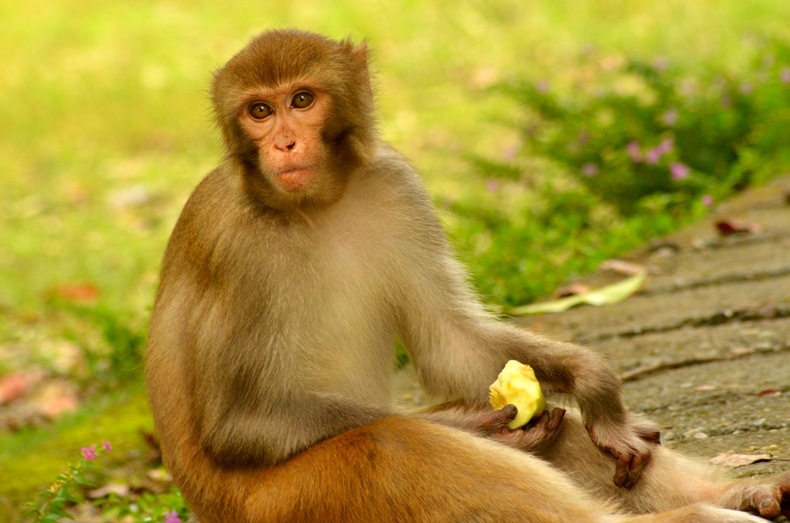
An Indian monkey in Malsi Deer Park

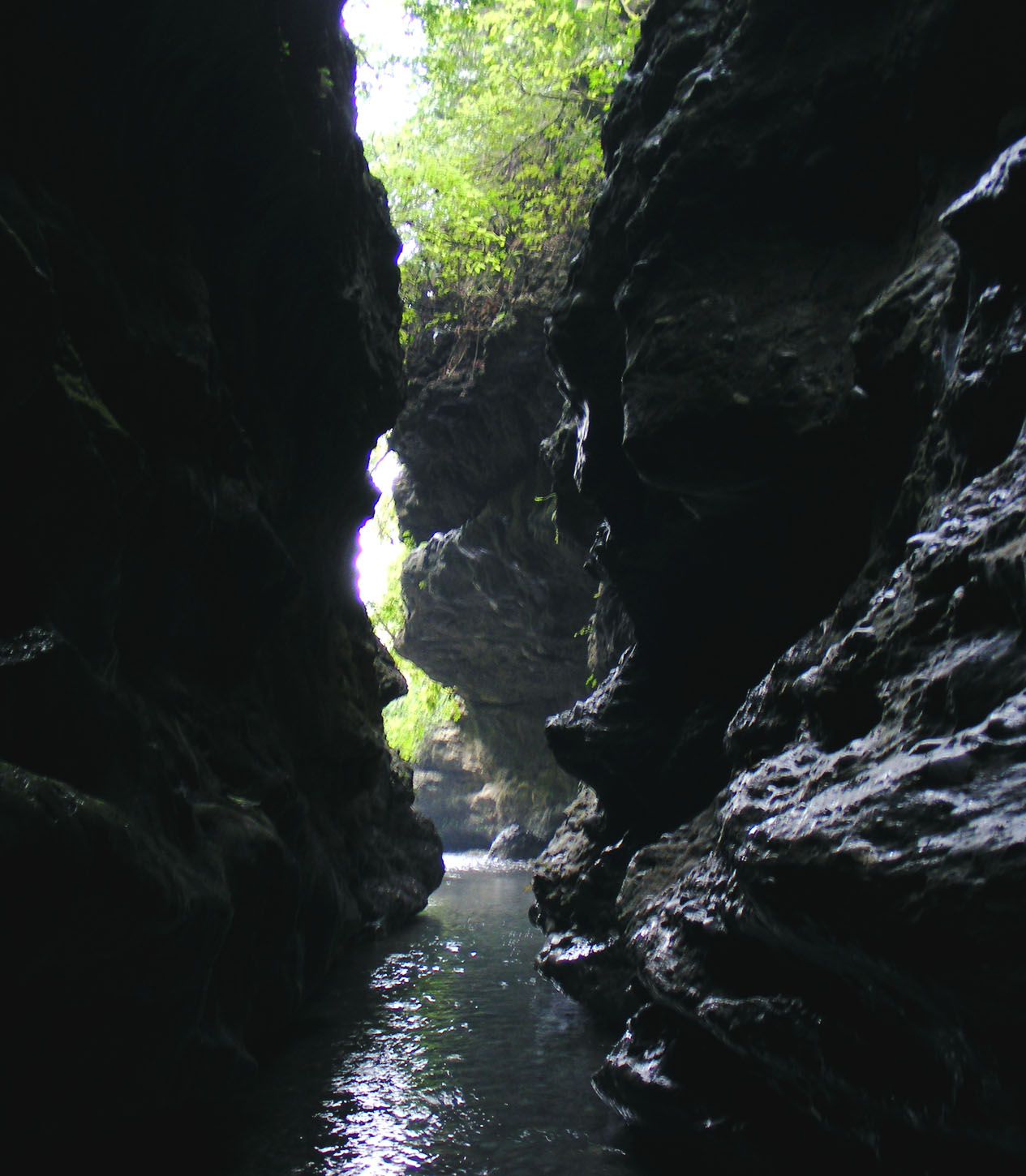
Robbers Cave, Dehradun

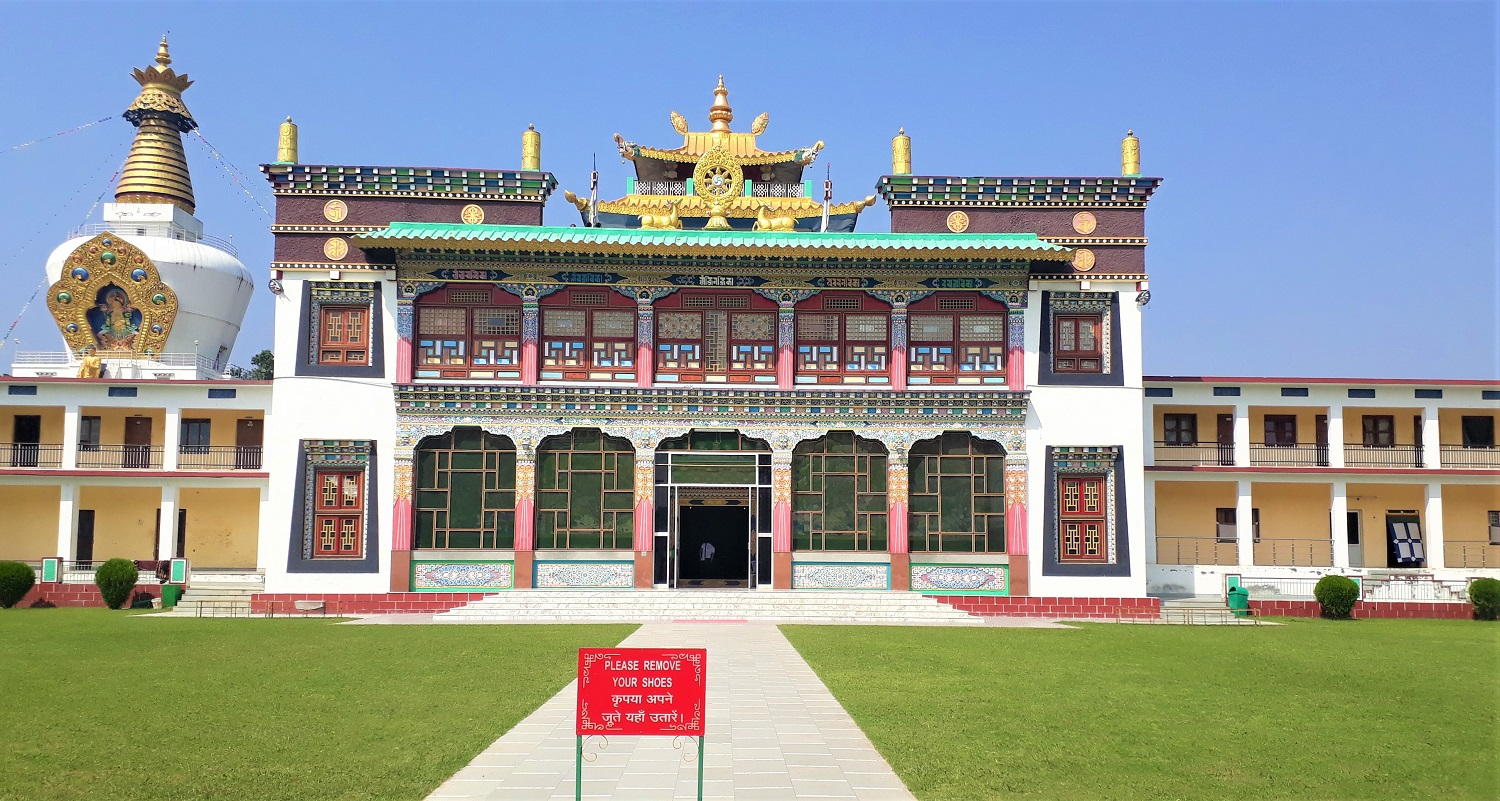
Front view of Buddha Temple Dehradun Uttarakhand

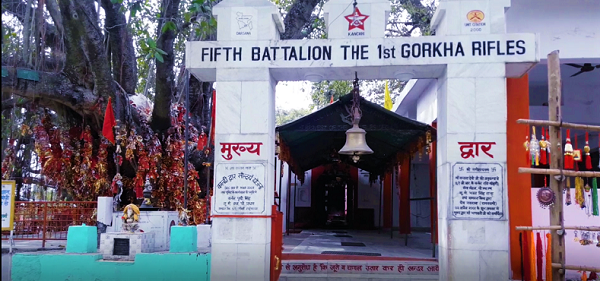
Santala Devi Temple Dehradun

=== Places of interest ===
There are a number of small towns and tourist sites in Dehradun District.

==== Kipling Trail ====
The Kipling Trail is the old walking route between Dehradun and Mussoorie that was named after English novelist Rudyard Kipling, who is believed to have walked the trail in the 1880s. It begins at Shahanshahi Ashram in Rajpur village. The trail is being revived as nature, history and hiking enthusiasts are increasingly using the trail over driving up to the hill station.

==== Khalanga War Memorial ====
The Battle of Nalapani was the first battle of the Anglo-Nepalese War of 1814–1816, fought between the forces of the British East India Company and Nepal, then ruled by the House of Gorkha. The battle took place around the Nalapani fort, near Dehradun, which was placed under siege by the British between 31 October and 30 November 1814.

==== Maa Bala Sundari Mandir ====
There are various temples of Maa Bala Sundari Devi situated in India and this is one such temple. The main temple is in Trilokpur, Himachal Pradesh. This temple is situated approximately three km (1.9 mi) South-West Direction of Sudhowala. This great temple is situated inside a forest. Gaur Brahmin of Sudhowala are Pandits (Brahman) of this temple. It is dedicated to the Hindu goddess Maa Bala Sundari, also known as Bal Roop of Maa Vaishno Devi, a manifestation of the Hindu Mother Goddess Mahalakshmi. The words "maa" and "mata" are commonly used in India for "mother", and thus are often used in connection with Maa Bala Sundari.

Various modes of transportation are available from Sudhowala, including ponies, electric vehicles and palkis operated by 2 or 4 persons. Many pilgrims visit from the northern Indian states to get the blessings of Mahamaya Bala Sundari. A trust is also run by Mandir Maa Bala Sundari Trust, Sudhowala.

==== Dehradun International Cricket Stadium ====
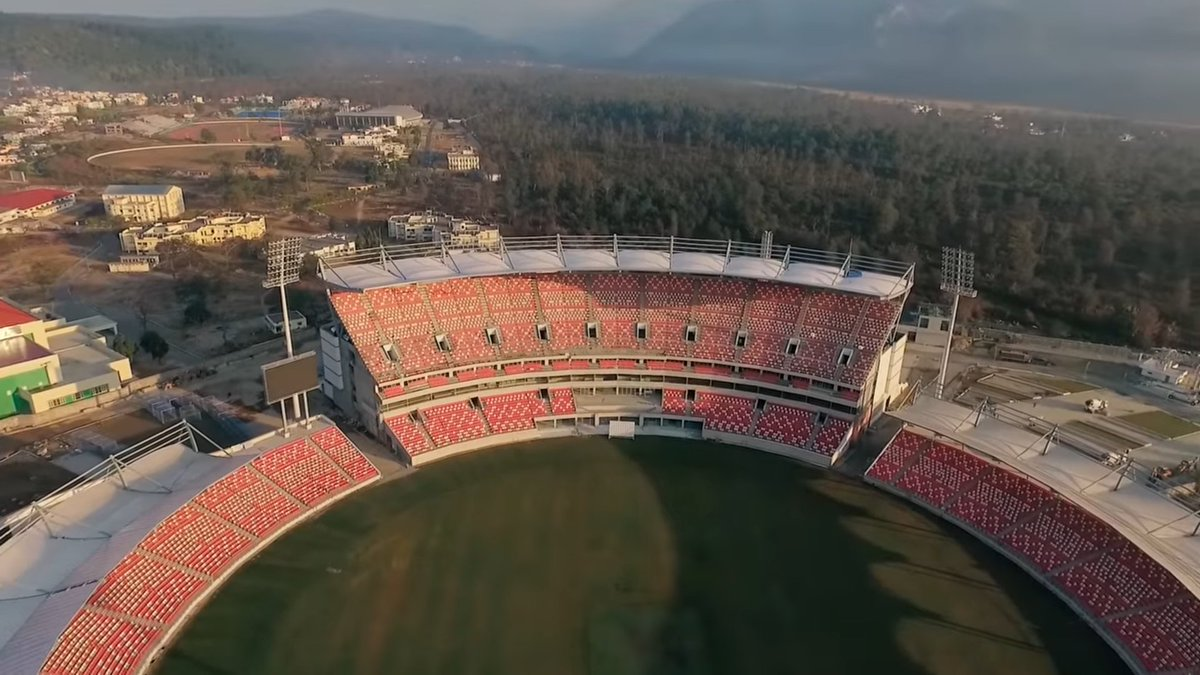
Dehradun cricket stadium

Rajiv Gandhi International Cricket Stadium is a multi-purpose stadium in the Raipur area of Dehradun, Uttarakhand. It is the first international level stadium in the state.

==== Robber's Cave ====
Robber's Cave (locally known as Guchhupani), is a river cave formation in Himalaya, located approximately eight km (5.0 mi) from the centre of Dehradun City in Uttarakhand state of India. Believed to be the hideout of the Sultana Daaku and his band of dacoits. The cave formation has thus been named Robber's Cave.

The cave is about 600 metres (2,000 ft) long, divided into two main parts. The cave has a highest fall of about 10 metres (33 ft). In the central part there is a fort wall structure which is now broken. It consists of an extremely narrow gorge formed in a conglomerate limestone area on Doon Valley's Dehra plateau.

It is a natural cave formation where rivers flows inside the cave. The place is a tourist site and is maintained by Uttarakhand State. Local bus services are available up to Anarwala village, from where it is a 1-kilometre (0.62 mi) trek.

==== Lachhiwala Picnic Spot ====
It is a popular tourist destination especially during summers. It is well known for its forests, man-made water pools and bird watching. It is now known as Nature Park.

==== Tapkeshwar Temple ====
It is a temple of Pashupati Shiva. It is situated beside a forest on the bank of the Asan river and the main deity (Shivalinga) is housed in a natural cave. According to the holy epic Mahabharata, Guru Drona is said to have resided in this cave for a period of time. The temple's natural cave is named Drona cave after him. Water trickles down the ceiling of the cave and drops on the Shivalinga creating a magnificent image.

==== Dehradun Zoo ====
Formerly known as Malsi Deer Park, the main objectives of Dehradun Zoo are conservation of wild animals, developing an education centre and a rescue centre for wild animals. It is located on the foothills of Shivalik Range on the Mussoorie Road. It is about ten km (6.2 mi) away from Dehradun and 23 km (14 mi) from Mussoorie.

==== Forest Research Institute ====
Forest Research Institute or 'FRI' is an institution in the field of forest research in India. It was founded as India's first forestry school in 1878 by Lt Col Frederick Bailey FRSE FRSGS of the Royal Engineers.

The institute is one of the oldest and biggest forest-based training institutes in India. The institute is known for its research work and wonderful architecture that dates to British Raj. FRI is affiliated to the Forest Research Institute University and is approved by the University Grants Commission (UGC). The aim of the institution is to accomplish the needs of the Indo-Gangetic plains of Punjab, Haryana, Chandigarh, Delhi and western Uttar Pradesh, as well as the Uttarakhand Himalayas.

==== Uttara Museum of Contemporary Art ====
Uttara Museum of Contemporary Art is an art museum in Dehradun dedicating multi-dimensional artworks in the memory of the Kedarnath disaster, 2013 North India floods.

The museum was founded in 2017 and is Uttarakhand's first art museum. It exhibits various aspects of the calamity and the folk culture of Uttarakhand through paintings, sculptures, and other artworks.

==== Regional Science Centre ====
Regional Science Centre (RSC) is located within the campus of Uttarakhand Council of Science and Technology (UCOST) at Vigyan Dham, Suddhowala on the outskirts of Dehradun. The Uttarakhand Regional Science Centre is developed by the National Council for Science Museum (NCSM) in collaboration with the UCOST. The Regional Science Centre is a common destination for school educational tours and hosts a science museum, planetarium, a 3D theatre, science gallery and scientific law based interactive exhibits.

==== Lambi Dehar Mines ====
A deserted Limestone Mine supposed to be a haunted place is located in the Mussoorie Range of Dehradun District.

==== Virasat ====
Virasat is a cultural festival that celebrates all aspects of the country's cultural heritage. The festival was held for the first time in 1995 in Dehradun. It is recognised as the Afro-Asia's biggest folk life and heritage festival. Organised by REACH (Rural Entrepreneurship for Art & Cultural Heritage), this week-long festival includes performances and workshops in Indian folk and classical arts, literature, crafts, theatre, cinema and yoga.

Virasat 2008 expanded the festival into a nationwide event.

== Media ==
Dehradun has print, radio and television media outlets serving Uttarakhand. Several Hindi- and English-language newspapers are published from or have editions in the city. Hindi-language publications include Dainik Jagran, Amar Ujala, Gorkha Sandesh, Hindustan, Uttarakhand Aaj, Himachal Times and Divya Himgiri. English-language publications include The Garhwal Post and The Dehradun Street, while national newspapers such as The Times of India, The Indian Express, The Hindu, Deccan Herald and Hindustan Times also circulate in the city.

All India Radio (Dehradun), part of Akashvani, operates radio services from the city, including FM broadcasts. Community radio stations include Radio Dehradun, Radio Zindagi, Hello Doon (NIVH) and Himgiri Ki Awaaz. Doordarshan Kendra in the city, is a regional centre of Doordarshan and provides programming for Uttarakhand, including through DD Uttarakhand. National and regional television channels are also available in the city through cable, satellite and internet-based services.

== Sport ==
Cricket is one of the most popular sports in Dehradun. The Cricket Association of Uttarakhand, the governing body for cricket in the state, is based in the city. The Rajiv Gandhi International Cricket Stadium in Raipur is a major cricket venue with a capacity of about 25,000 spectators and has hosted domestic and international matches. The stadium has also served as a home venue for the Afghanistan national cricket team in India.

The Maharana Pratap Sports Complex in Raipur includes a 60 m × 30 m indoor ice rink, which has hosted ice hockey and ice-skating competitions and also supports rink bandy activities. The complex is part of the city's wider sports infrastructure and also includes facilities for other sports. Dehradun and the surrounding region are also centres for adventure sports and outdoor recreation, including trekking, rafting, paragliding and other mountain activities. The city's proximity to the Himalayan foothills provides access to a range of outdoor sporting destinations.

== Architecture ==
After Dehradun was made the capital of Uttarakhand, there was a construction boom, especially in residential properties. Modern buildings have gradually supplanted older architectural styles including those related to the British colonial rule of India. Important older buildings still upstanding include the Clock Tower, Forest Research Institute, CNI College, Morrison Memorial Church, Inamullah Building, Jama Masjid, Osho Meditation Centre, Indian Military Academy and Darbar Sahib.

== In popular culture ==
- George Harrison of the Beatles wrote a song called "Dehra Dun" during the group's stay in Rishikesh in early 1968. The song remained unreleased until its appearance on the super deluxe edition of Harrison's album All Things Must Pass in 2021.

== Notable people ==
List of notable personalities from Dehradun:

- Aniruddh Agarwal – actor
- Tom Alter – former TV and film actor
- Prerna Arora- Bollywood producer and director
- Saira Banu – former film actress in the 1960s
- Shivanku Bhatt – former model
- Abhinav Bindra – Olympic gold medalist shooter
- Sonam Bisht – television actress
- Ruskin Bond - author
- Bobby Cash – country music artist
- Vikram Singh Chauhan – television actor
- Vir Das – film actor and stand-up comedian
- Aniruddh Dave – TV actor
- Deepak Dobriyal – TV actor
- Udita Goswami – former actress
- Vikas Gupta – producer, TV presenter, former Bigg Boss contestant
- Amardeep Jha – film actress
- Shivangi Joshi – TV actor
- Anshul Jubli – MMA fighter, Road to UFC Season 1 winner
- Surendra Pal Joshi
- Raghav Juyal – dancer, television host
- Monisha Kaltenborn – businesswoman
- Sanjay Kaul – political activist
- Sadhana Naithani – folklorist and scholar
- Jubin Nautiyal – Indian singer
- Asha Negi – television actress
- Lokesh Ohri – anthropologist and heritage activist
- Hemant Pandey – film actor
- Nirmal Pandey – actor
- Sudhanshu Pandey – model
- Dehra Parker (1882–1963) – former MP of Parliament of Northern Ireland
- Nitin Sahrawat actor, environmentalist
- Deepa Sahi – actress
- Shraddha Sharma – singer
- Vandana Shiva- food sovereignty advocate, Indian scholar, ecofeminist
- Himani Shivpuri – Actress
- Archana Puran Singh – TV, film actress
- K. N. Singh – actor
- Rrahul Sudhir – TV actor
- Anirudh Thapa – football player
- Madhurima Tuli – actress
- Ali Abbas Zafar – film director

== See also ==
- Dehradun Municipal Corporation
- List of cities in Uttarakhand and Himachal Pradesh by population
- Garhwal Division
