= Khalanga War Memorial =

Heritage monument in Dehradun, India

- Location within Uttarakhand Location within India
- 30.3426°N 78.0983°E
- Location: Dehradun

Site notes
- Area: Tibbanala Pani, Sahastradhara Road
- Governing body: Archaeological Survey of India

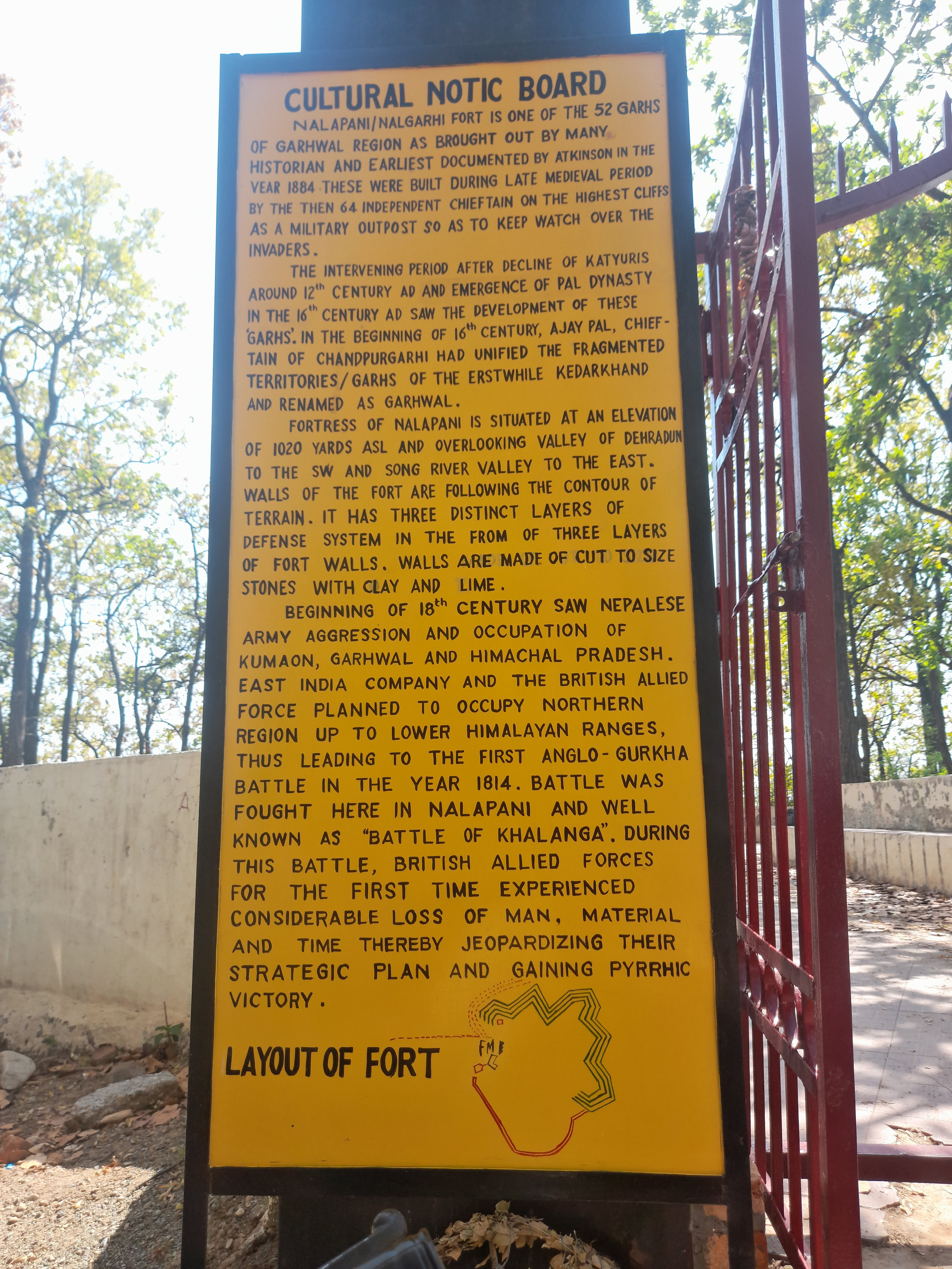
Notice board at the Khalanga War Memorial

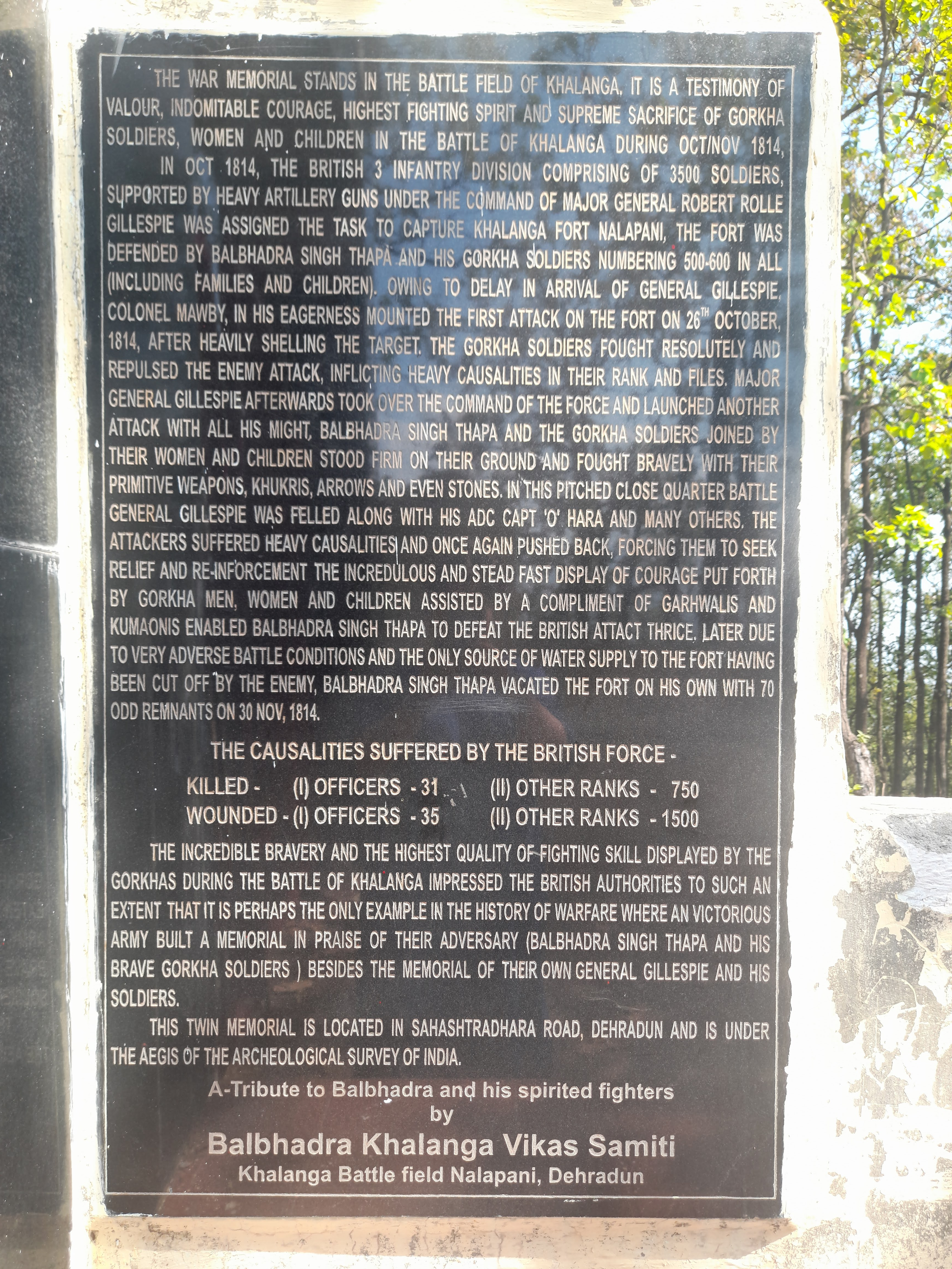
Description of the Khalanga/Nalapani war at the Khalanga War Memorial, Dehradun

Khalanga War Memorial is a heritage monument in Dehradun, India, dedicated to the memory of Gorkha soldiers who fought the British in 1814 in the Battle of Nalapani, the first battle of the Anglo-Nepalese War. It has been described as the only monument in the history of warfare to have been erected by a victorious army for its adversaries, as the British were reportedly impressed with the valour of the Gorkhas. The structure falls under the aegis of the Archaeological Survey of India. Every year, a fair is held at the site to commemorate the soldiers and to celebrate Gorkha culture and history. The Gorkha rule in Uttarakhand, also known as "Gorkhyani" or the "Khukri Raj," occurred from roughly 1790 to 1815.
