= Ecole Globale International Girls' School =

École Globale International Girls' School

Location
- Village Horawalla, Near Sahaspur; Dehradun, Uttarakhand; India; 30°19′07″N 78°02′54″E

Information
- Type: Private international boarding school
- Established: 2012; 14 years ago
- Founder: Amarjeet Juneja
- Status: Open
- School board: Central Board of Secondary Education, Cambridge International Examinations
- Director: Tarunjyot Juneja
- Head of school: Ms. Kanchan Khandke
- Teaching staff: 70
- Grades: 4th to 12th
- Gender: Girls
- Enrolment: c. 300
- Classes: English, Hindi, Mathematics, Computers
- Language: English
- Schedule: 9am - 6pm
- Campus size: 16 hectares (40 acres)
- Sports: Swimming, Squash, Badminton, Basketball, Football, Tennis, Table Tennis, Pistol Shooting, Rifle Shooting, Equestrian, Yoga, Athletics
- Annual tuition: ₹10,00,000 – 13,00,000
- Affiliations: Cambridge International Examinations; Central Board of Secondary Education
- Alumni: ecoliers
- Website: www.ecoleglobale.com

École Globale International Girls' School is a private international boarding school for girls, situated in the foothills of the Himalayas in Dehradun, Uttarakhand, India.

== History ==
Ecole Globale was founded in 2013 by Amarjeet Juneja to provide college-preparatory education to girl students from India and overseas. There are over 300 students at the school.

== Affiliation ==
École Globale International Girls' School is affiliated with the Cambridge International Examinations (CIE) and the Central Board of Secondary Education (CBSE).

== Academics ==
École Globale offers education from grades 4th to 12th. Students have a choice to study science, commerce or humanities after Class 8th (for students who have opted for the CIE curriculum) and Class 10th (for students who have opted for the CBSE curriculum) The school is located on a 16-hectare (40-acre) campus.

École Globale International Girls' School was awarded with the National Excellence Award at the 3rd National School Excellence Awards Ceremony hosted by Brain feed in New Delhi.

== Sports ==
Students of École Globale International Schools' students participated with other schools in different state level Competitions.
