= Descendants of the Sikh gurus =

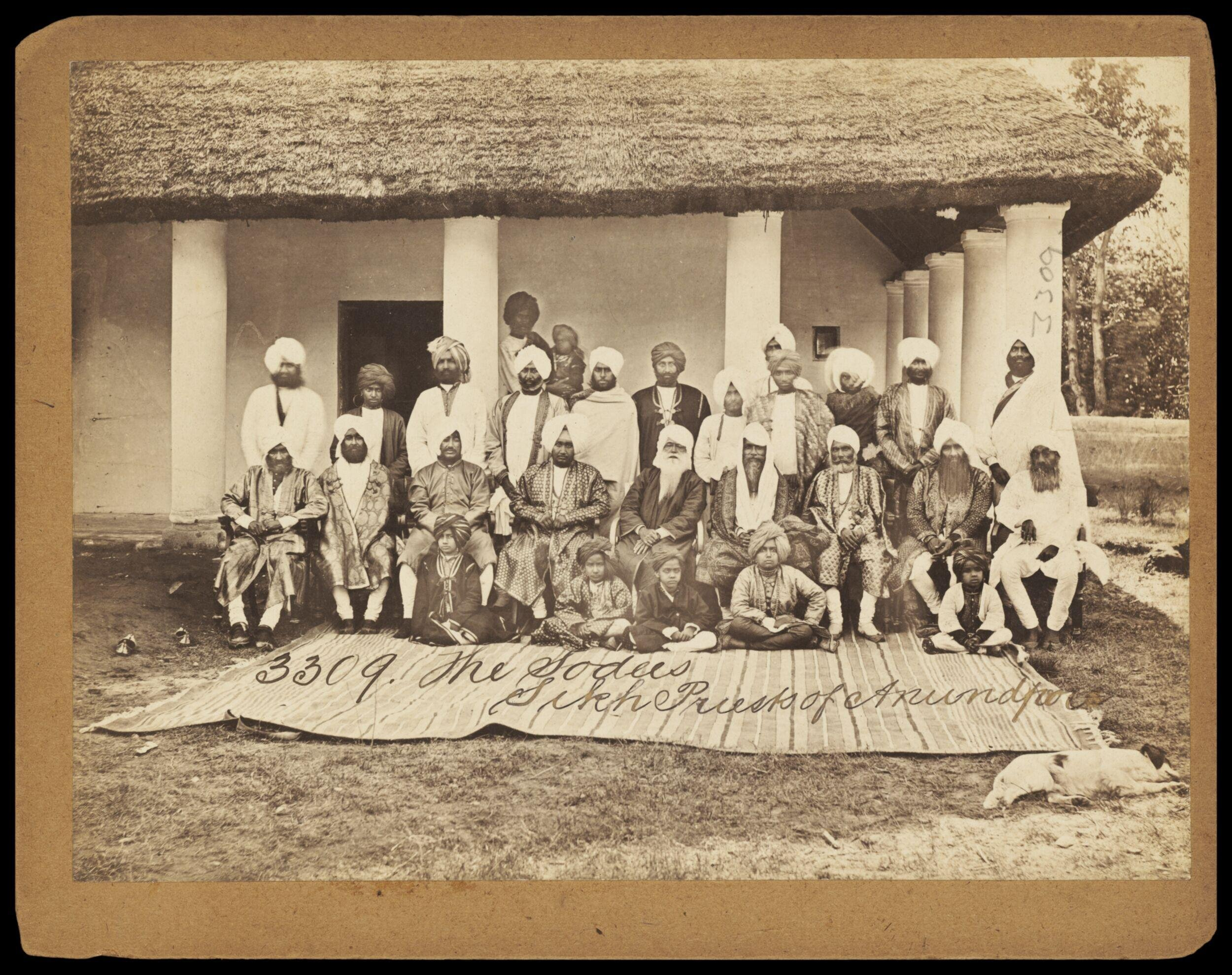
Photograph of the Sodhis of Anandpur Sahib, by Francis Frith, ca.1850's–1870's

Descendants of the Sikh gurus, known as Guru-ansh, Guru-vans, or Ansi Sikhs, claim descent from the specific lineages of the Bedi, Trehan, Bhalla, and Sodhi clans of the Khatris that propagated from the Sikh gurus and their offspring. Most descendants are through the Sodhis, as seven out of the ten Sikh gurus were Sodhis. They were accorded elevated-levels of respect and veneration in the pre-colonial period beginning in the 18th century during Sikh-rule but this was challenged during the Singh Sabha movement, with them losing much power and influence in the period thereafter. Descendants of the Sikh gurus can be found residing at Una, Dera Baba Nanak, Khadur, Pinjore, Jalandhar, Guru Harsahai, Kartarpur, and Anandpur amid others. As per Harjot Singh Oberoi, the guru descendants were critical for the propagation of Sanatan Sikhism during the 18th and 19th centuries.

Some of the families have intermarried, an example being Ramji (Kashmiran), daughter of Baba Khem Singh of the Bedi family, marrying Guru Bishen Singh of the Sodhi family of Guru Harsahai.

== History ==
=== Origin ===
When selecting his successor, Guru Nanak did not follow the hereditary norms by choosing his son but rather chose a follower who was not related to him. This was because a successor was a spiritual one, not necessary one whom is blood-related. This presented a challenge, as there had to be a balance between doctrinal originality and social unity. Due to these challenges, some blood-relatives, including descendants, of the Sikh gurus vyed for their own claims to guruship to seek power and influence, leading to internal challenges within the early Sikh community. Guru Gobind Singh officially ended a personal guruship by bestowing guruship on the scripture, yet many of the heterodoxical Sikh sects did not follow this shift and continued practicing personal guruship to a human. The descendants of the Sikh gurus originated from the Bedi, Trehan, Bhalla, and Sodhi gots of the Khatris.

=== During Sikh-rule ===
The descendants of Sikh gurus became organized into various guru-lineages, whom were venerated by the Sikh population (sometimes in a similar manner as the Sikh gurus themselves were). At their deras, they provided a religious education to pupils, gave charity, and held relics. They propagated a form of Sanatan Sikhism through the Guru-Sikhi tradition, consisting of a dyadic relationship between themselves and their patrons, serving ritual and political functions. The guru-lineages were sought after for advice and blessings. The contemporary Sikh rulers awarded such descendant-lineages with jagir and dharmarth grants, with some serving directly in the administration and receiving salaries. They were also involved in the military campaigns of local chiefs. They served in military, government, and in religious spheres. As custodians of sacred Sikh relics and shrines, they were able to centre regional seasonal festivities (melas) around their establishments' ritual traditions and command influence, sometimes having armed retainers attached to themselves. They spread their interpretation of Sikhism amongst the Punjabi Hindu and Muslim peasantry. The popularity of a given lineage at any particular point of time depended on the charisma of its current head and their relations with the ruling authority. Notable guru-lineages active in 19th century Punjab were as follows:

Guru-lineages in 19th century Punjab
| Name of lineage | Headquarters | Areas of influence |
|---|---|---|
| Sodhis of Anandpur | Anandpur | Doaba and Malwa |
| Bedis of Una | Una | Majha and Doaba |
| Sodhis of Guru Harsahai | Guru Harsahai (Firozpur) | Malwa, Kohat, Hazara, Kabul, and Rawalpindi |
| Sodhis of Rawalpindi (Khem Singh Bedi) | Rawalpindi | Rawalpindi, Attock, Lyallpur, and Shahpur |
| Sodhis of Haranpur | Haranpur (Jhelum) | Jhelum |
| Bhallas of Rawalpindi | Rawalpindi | Rawalpindi |
| Sodhis of Buttar | Buttar (Firozpur) | Malwa |
| Sodhis of Kartarpur | Kartarpur (Jalandhar) | Doaba and Malwa |

According to Chaupa Singh Chhibber's rehitnama written in c.1770, the descendants of Sikh gurus should be respected. The rehitnama states:

A Sikh of the Guru should accept the descendants of the Gurus; places associated with the Gurus should be respected. All who serve the Guru should be respected; the Guru's writings should be accepted. All whom the Master has called his own should be honored. [Even] the Guru's dogs should be respected.

— Chaupa Singh, Rahit Nāmā, line 107, page 70 (translated by Anne Murphy)

However, simply being a descendant of the Sikh gurus was not enough to be respected, as one had to embody the authority of the gurus, which is the message transmitted in the Prahlad Rai rehitnama dated by W. H. McLeod to the 1730s. This is reflected in the ex-communication of the Mina descendants of the Sikh gurus, who are shunned by mainstream Sikhs despite them being direct descendants. Thus, a descendant's allegiance to the true teachings of the Sikh gurus is taken into account when determining if they are worthy of respect. This attitude may have been in-response to some descendants attempting to create rival sects and guruship lineages, challenging the authority and validity of the mainstream tradition.

Sarup Das Bhalla, a direct-descendant of Guru Amar Das, attempts to bolster the image of the descendants of the Sikh gurus in his work, Mahima Prakash (1776), even the ex-communicated lineages of Prithi Chand (Minas), Dhir Mal (Dhirmalias), and Ram Rai (Ramraiyas) are attempted to be rehabilitated in the work. This was an attempt to improve the image of the Guru-ansh so they could receive patronage from Sikh rulers at the time. During Sikh-rule, the influence and prestige of the guru descendants increased, especially with the Bedi and Sodhis, albeit the Trehans and Bhallas also received state-patronage to a lesser extent. A descendant of Dhir Mal, likely Wadhbag Singh Sodhi of Kartarpur, is believed to have approached Jassa Singh Ahluwalia in-order to request a reconsideration of old injunction against the Dhirmalias by the Khalsa. After some deliberation, it was decided that the Dhirmalias could re-join the Sikh fold. Thus, descendant-groups formerly shunned began to become accepted by the mainstream and receive state-patronage. Due to this, the families of the descendants became wealthy and earned respect in Sikh circles.

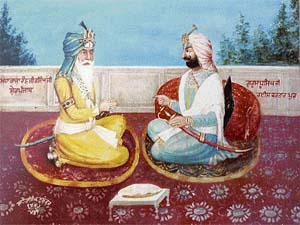
Painting of Maharaja Ranjit Singh seated with Baba Sadhu Singh Sodhi, circa late 19th century

The Sikh Empire of Ranjit Singh patronized the guru descendants. Over forty-percent of its religious charity revenue grants (dharmarth) were issued to Bedi and Sodhi descendants, who also often received jagir granths and cash salaries for additional services for the polity.

=== Colonial period ===
During the period of the Singh Sabha movement, the guru-ansh sided with the traditionalist Amritsar Singh Sabha faction rather than the reformist Lahore Singh Sabha. The reformist Sikhs, such as the Tat Khalsa, believed that all Sikhs should be treated equally, thus were opposed to descendants of the Sikh gurus being given more respect than ordinary Sikhs. The 'cushion controversy' involving Khem Singh Bedi at Darbar Sahib stirred-up a debate over the status of the guru descendants. Khem Singh Bedi was one of the main-backers of the Amritsar faction, alongside the Faridkot ruler, Raja Bikram Singh. Its rival, the Lahore Singh Sabha was led by a low-caste Sikh named Ditt Singh, who opposed the special treatment afforded to the descendants of Sikh gurus, calling for equality, also opposing the pujaris priests whom were acting as gurus in their caretaker role of Sikh shrines. Thus, the Lahore Singh Sabha, under the leadership of Gurmukh Singh and Harsa Singh, opposed the veneration of the descendants and the practice of living gurus. Eventually, the Lahore faction won-over the Amritsar faction amongst the Sikh populace. After the Singh Sabha movement, the guru descendants lost much of the prestige, power, and influence they once held in Sikh society.

=== Present ===
Descendants of the Sikh gurus continue to hold many relics in their familial possession, such as rare, early manuscripts of Sikh scriptures.

== Guru Nanak's descendants ==
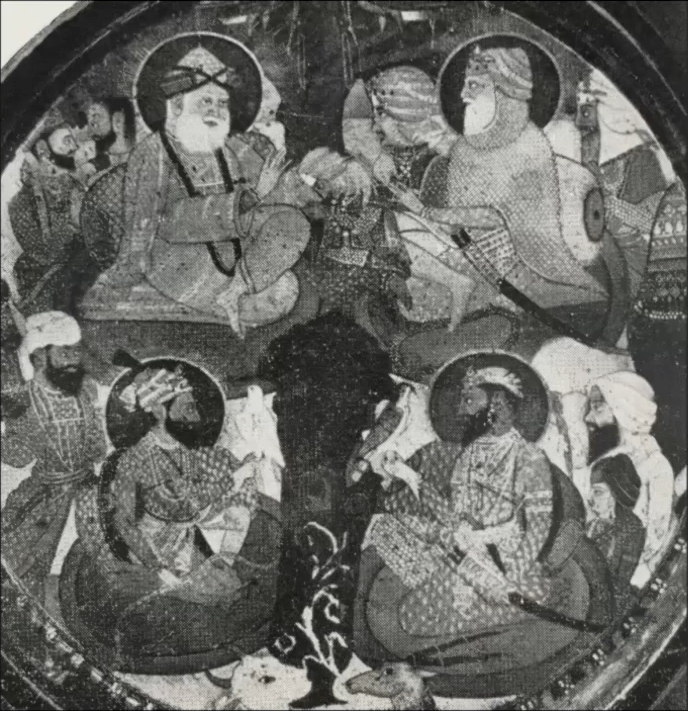
Painting of Baba Sahib Singh Bedi and his son, Tegh Singh Bedi, seated across from Guru Nanak and Guru Gobind Singh. Punjab, circa 1830

Guru Nanak was a Khatri of the Bedi clan. Guru Nanak had two sons, Sri Chand and Lakhmi Das. Sri Chand was an ascetic and did not produce offspring, however Lakhmi Das did have children. Thus, all claimants to Guru Nanak's lineage descend from Lakhmi Das. The Bedis existed before Lakhmi Das despite them claiming descent from him. The Bedis were divided into four major divisions or biradaris. Due to Nanak being a Bedi, the Bedis came to hold influence during the era of Sikh-rule beginning in the late 18th century due to their descent and their supposed religious piety. The Bedis were given revenue-free land grants by both the states and estates (jagirdars) and offered positions of power. Dera Baba Nanak in Gurdaspur district is their traditional headquarters.

Many of the descendants reside at Una in Himachal Pradesh. There are also Bedi descendants of Guru Nanak at Dera Baba Nanak, located near Kartarpur (Narowal). Much of the land at Dera Baba Nanak is owned by Nanak's descendants and a robe, known as a chola sahib, with Quranic inscriptions said to have been owned by Nanak, is kept there. The cotton robe is believed to have been worn by Guru Nanak during his udasi (travels) to Mecca and Medina in Arabia. The robe was passed-down in four subsequent generations of descendants until it was preserved as a sacred relic.

According to the Bedi Foundation, all descendants of Guru Nanak can be traced to the settlement of Dera Baba Nanak, which had been settled by Baba Dharam Chand, the grandson of Guru Nanak and the only son of Baba Lakhmi Chand, the son of Guru Nanak. However, generations of various lineages of the descendants of Dharam Chand had later moved to locations such as Una, Rawalpindi, Lahore, Pune, Saharanpur, Delhi, or overseas. Nanak's descendants can be divided further into the Manakchandias and Meherchandias, based upon which son of Dharam Chand they descend from (Manak Chand or Meher Chand). The family inhabited various Gallis (street/lane) and Mohallas (neighbourhood) of Dera Baba Nanak.

Some notable descendants of Guru Nanak were Sahib Singh Bedi and Khem Singh Bedi. Both of them were from the Manakchandia branch of descendants. There were various branches of the Meherchandia branch. A later sub-branch of the Meherchandias was the Quilewala Bedis. The Quilewalia Bedis received patronage under Maharaja Ranjit Singh and were granted a jagir sanad on 1 January 1854 by the British colonial government.

Sahib Singh Bedi, one of the most notable Bedis who held influence in Doaba and Majha, was the grandson of Baba Kaladhari. In the 1770s, he negotiated peace regarding a land dispute between Sardar Gurdit Singh of Santokhgarh and Raja Umed Singh of Jaswan, which won him acclaim and land-grants. Sahib Singh became the jagirdar of Kulgaron village and earned the revenue income of Una. He was also celebrated for his exposition abilities regarding Sikh scripture and theology, winning him more jagir grants. One of his most devoted patrons was Ranjit Singh, who attributed his victory over the Bhangis at Gujrat to Sahib Singh's blessings, with him also conducting the coronation ceremony of Ranjit Singh in 1801 at Lahore.

As per the 1881 census of India, there were 6,804 Bedis in Punjab, mostly concentrated in the Doaba region.

== Guru Angad's descendants ==
Guru Angad was a Khatri of the Trehan clan. Guru Angad had two sons, Datu and Dasu. Descendants of both of his sons reside at Khadur Sahib. Binod Singh was a Trehan Khatri descendant of Guru Angad's lineage. Peter Bance interviewed a supposed descendant of Guru Angad living in Peshawar, Pakistan named Baba Amir Singh. According to Richard Carnac Temple, the descendants of Guru Angad had the Bawa title appended to their names.

== Guru Amar Das' descendants ==
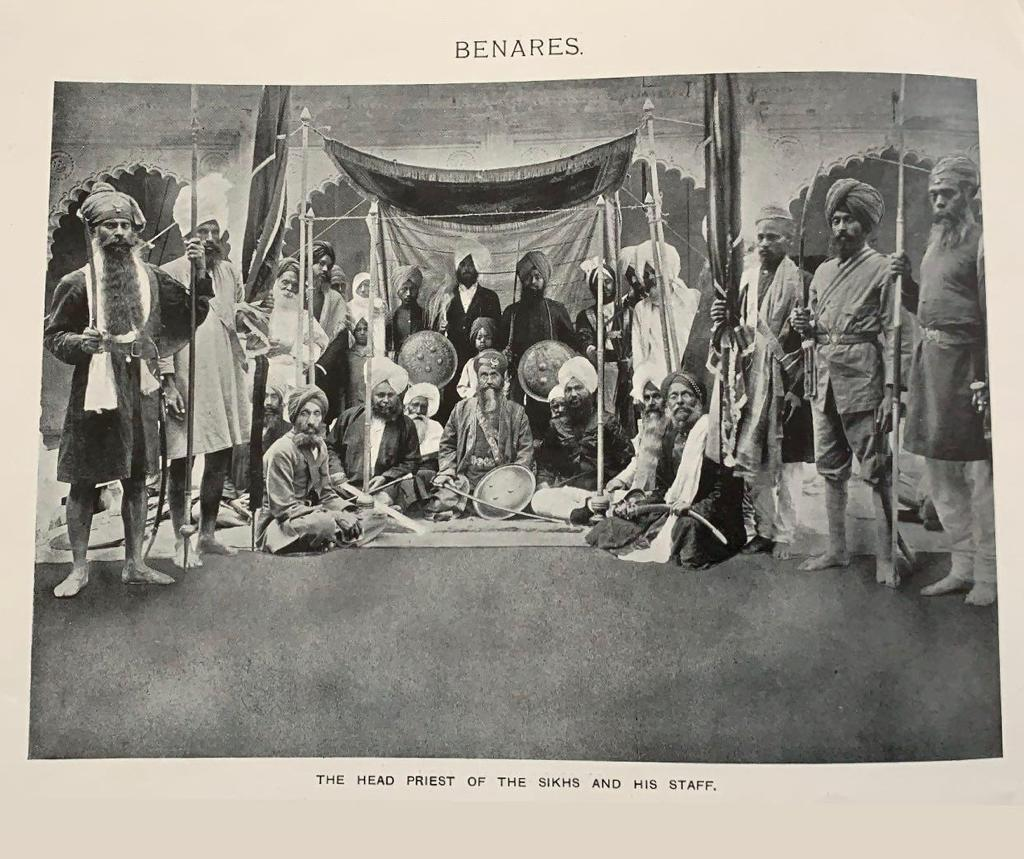
Sumer Singh, descendant of Guru Amar Das, with his suite

Guru Amar Das was a Khatri of the Bhalla clan. Guru Amar Das had two sons, Mohan and Mohri. Descendants of Mohan reside at Pinjore whilst descendants of Mohri reside at Jalandhar. Arath Mal was the grandson of Guru Amar Das. Sarup Das Bhalla, author of the Mahima Prakash (1776), was a descendant of Guru Amar Das in the tenth generation. Sarup Das compiled the work after consulting janasakhi traditions and consulting with other descendants of the Sikh gurus. Sumer Singh, head granthi of Takht Patna Sahib in the late 19th century, was a descendant of Guru Amar Das. The family of Narinder Singh Kapany claims to be descended from Guru Amar Das through the guru's son Mohari. Balwant Singh Bhalla, a 15th generation direct descendant of Guru Amar Das, presided over a 31 August 1986 meeting in New Delhi that preceded the foundation of the Rashtriya Sikh Sangat.

== Descendants of the Sodhi gurus ==
The latter Sikh gurus, from Guru Ram Das to Guru Gobind Singh, were from the Sodhi clan of Khatris. The descendants of the latter gurus can be categorized into two groups: the vadda mel ("greater relationship" or "higher line") and chhota mel ("lesser relationship" or "lower line"). The vadde mel consists of the descendants of Suraj Mal (the family of Anandpur) while the chhote mel are descendants of Prithi Chand (consisting of the Minas, one of the Panj Mel). They traditionally had the Sodhi title prefixed to their name. Many of the Sodhi descendants of the latter gurus attempted to set-up their own rival guruship lineages as heterodoxical sects, most notably Prithi Chand, Dhir Mal, and Ram Rai, and their successors. Another descendant, Gulab Rai, grandson of Guru Hargobind, also attempted to establish his own sect centred around him as a guru.

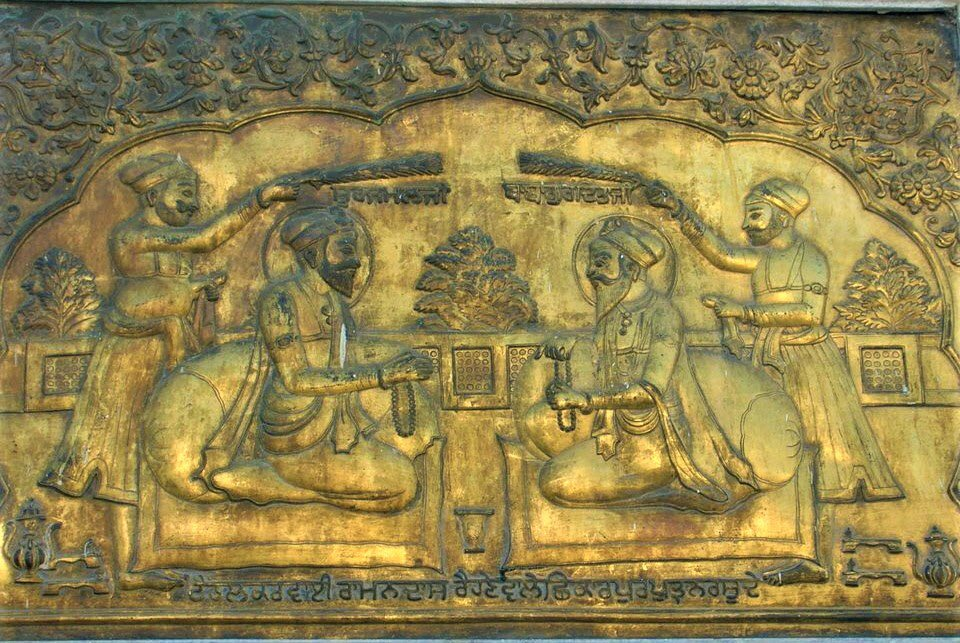
19th century gold panel from Gurdwara Baba Atal Rai, Amritsar depicting Baba Gurditta with his brother Suraj Mal

Guru Ram Das had three sons, the eldest Prithi Chand went on to have children, with his descendants being the Mina gurus, such as at Guru Har Sahai. From Guru Hargobind's younger son, Suraj Mal, there lives descendants at Anandpur Sahib. The descendants of Suraj Mal occupied Anandpur Sahib after Guru Gobind Singh vacated the region in 1704. Guru Hargobind also had a grandson, Dhir Mal, born from his eldest son, Baba Gurditta. Dhir Mal's descendants live in Kartarpur (Jalandhar district). Guru Hargobind also had two other sons but they are not historically relevant. Ram Rai, son of Guru Har Rai, did not have children but his spiritual lineage continues at the Ram Rai Darbar at Dehradun. Guru Har Krishan died in childhood and Guru Tegh Bahadur had one son, Guru Gobind Singh. Guru Gobind Singh's four sons were all killed due to persecution.

A descendant of Guru Arjan's elder brother Prithi Chand, named Sodhi Kaul, assisted Guru Gobind Singh at Dhilwan Kalan during his escape from Chamkaur via the Machhiwara jungle. The guru discarded his blue clothing he had been wearing as a disguise. Gurdwara Godavarisar marks the location of this event.

At the time of the Sikh Empire, Maharaja Ranjit Singh awarded revenue-free grants to Sodhis, who were not strictly associated with any particular religion and usually "maintained a considerable number of horsemen". Towards the end of his reign, the total worth of their jagirs (fiefs) was ₹500,000 a year. Ranjit Singh lavishly patronised a descendant of Dhir Mal, Sodhi Sadhu Singh, with a gift of several villages.

=== Vadda Mel ===
==== Anandpur ====
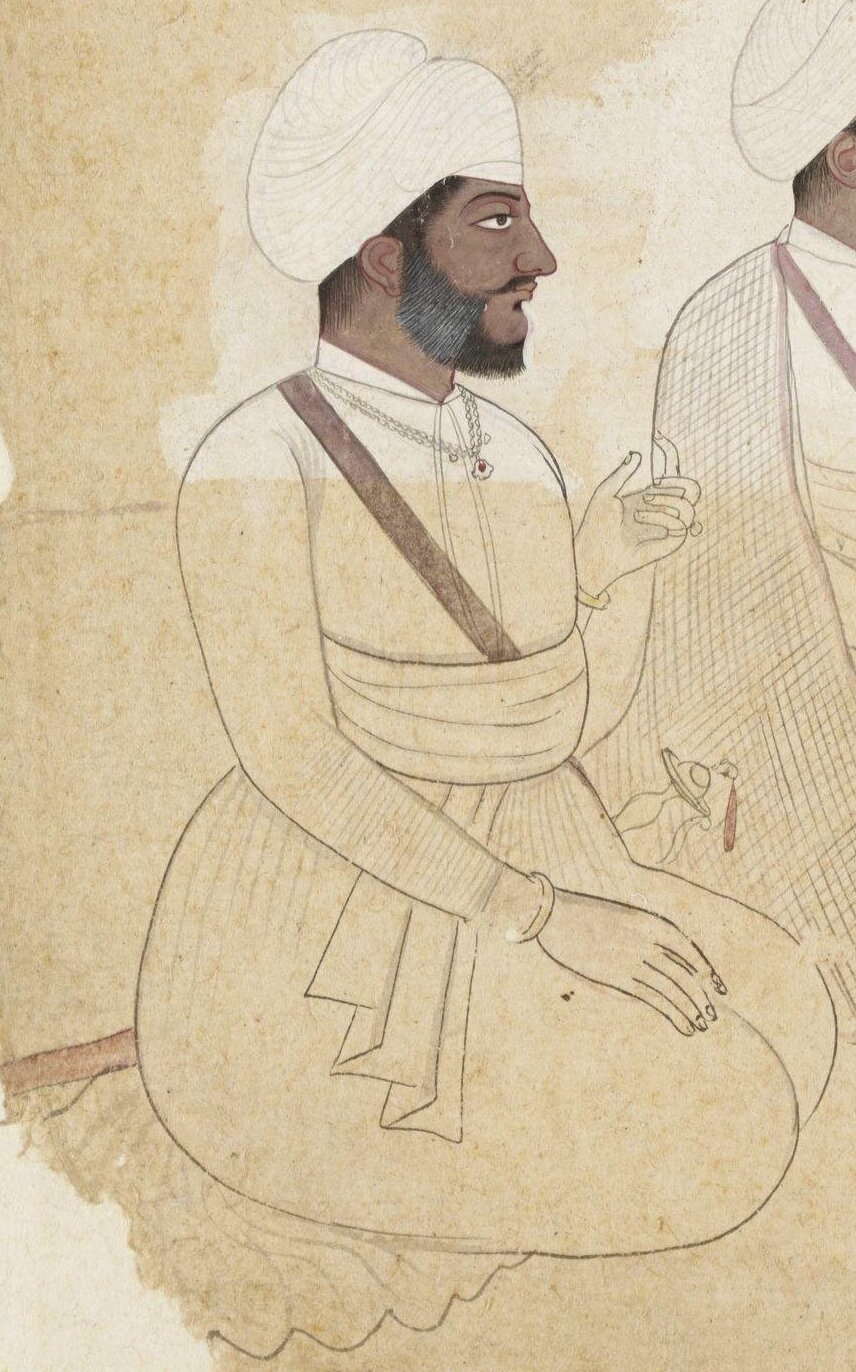
Sodhi Nahar Singh of Anandpur, detail from a painting of three seated Sikh sardars, circa late 18th century

Anandpur Sahib holds a special role in Sikhism as being the location where the Khalsa order was founded. The Sodhis of Anandpur were one of the prevalent guru-lineages, claiming descent from Sham Chand (born 1662). The descendants of Suraj Mal occupied Anandpur Sahib after Guru Gobind Singh vacated the region in 1704. They came to prominence during the 18th century under the four brothers Nahar Singh, Udai Singh, Khem Singh, and Chaur Singh, whose descendants are known respectively as the baṛī (eldest), dusrī (second), tīsrī (third), and chauthī (fourth) sections (sarkārs) of the Anandpuri Sodhis. There were two additional brothers named Inder Singh and Jowahir Singh. This order of preminance amongst the four sections of descentants of the four notable brothers was showcased when offerings were made by devotees at Manji Sahib Tikka shrine. The region of Anandpur Sahib came under their influence and hegemony, with them controlling the major shrines of Anandpur. Their support was also needed for any military actions made by the Sikh chiefs south of the Sutlej river. Amongst the patrons of the Anandpuri Sodhis included the Sikh Empire, Patiala, and Faridkot. During festivals, such as Holi at Anandpur, thousands of pilgrims would seek the Anandpuri Sodhis' blessings, especially the sick and women trying to conceive a child. In the 1870s, Captain Montgomery observed such a celebration at Anandpur, consisting of 30,000 devotees visiting the sacred shrines and a procession of the head Anandpuri Sodhi descendant on an elephant.

The Sodhis of Anandpur held revenue free lands in Anandpur Sahib and various other parts of Punjab. They were the ruling family of Anandpur Sahib. They later served as landlords in the region. Sodhi Kishan Singh in the late 1890s established Anandpur Sahib as a formal municipal corporation and as a planned city. A figure of this lineage in the 20th century was Sodhi Haravtar Singh (died July 2010), who served in the Municipal Committee of Anandpur Sahib. Haravtar's sons are Justice R. S. Sodhi, a former judge of the Delhi High Court (1999–2007) who has been described as the 13th descendant of Guru Ram Das, and Sodhi Vikram Singh (Managing Trustee of the Anandpur Sahib Heritage Foundation). Haravtar's daughters are Rimlu Giani and Indira Maini.

=== Chotta Mel ===
==== Guru Harsahai ====
There are Sodhi descendants of Prithi Chand that are known as the Sodhis of Harsahai, located in Firozpur district. They manage a shrine known as the Pothi-Mala at Guru Har Sahai, which was named so because it was where the relics were kept consisting of Nanak's pothi (scripture) and malā (rosary). An annual festival was held on Baisakhi.

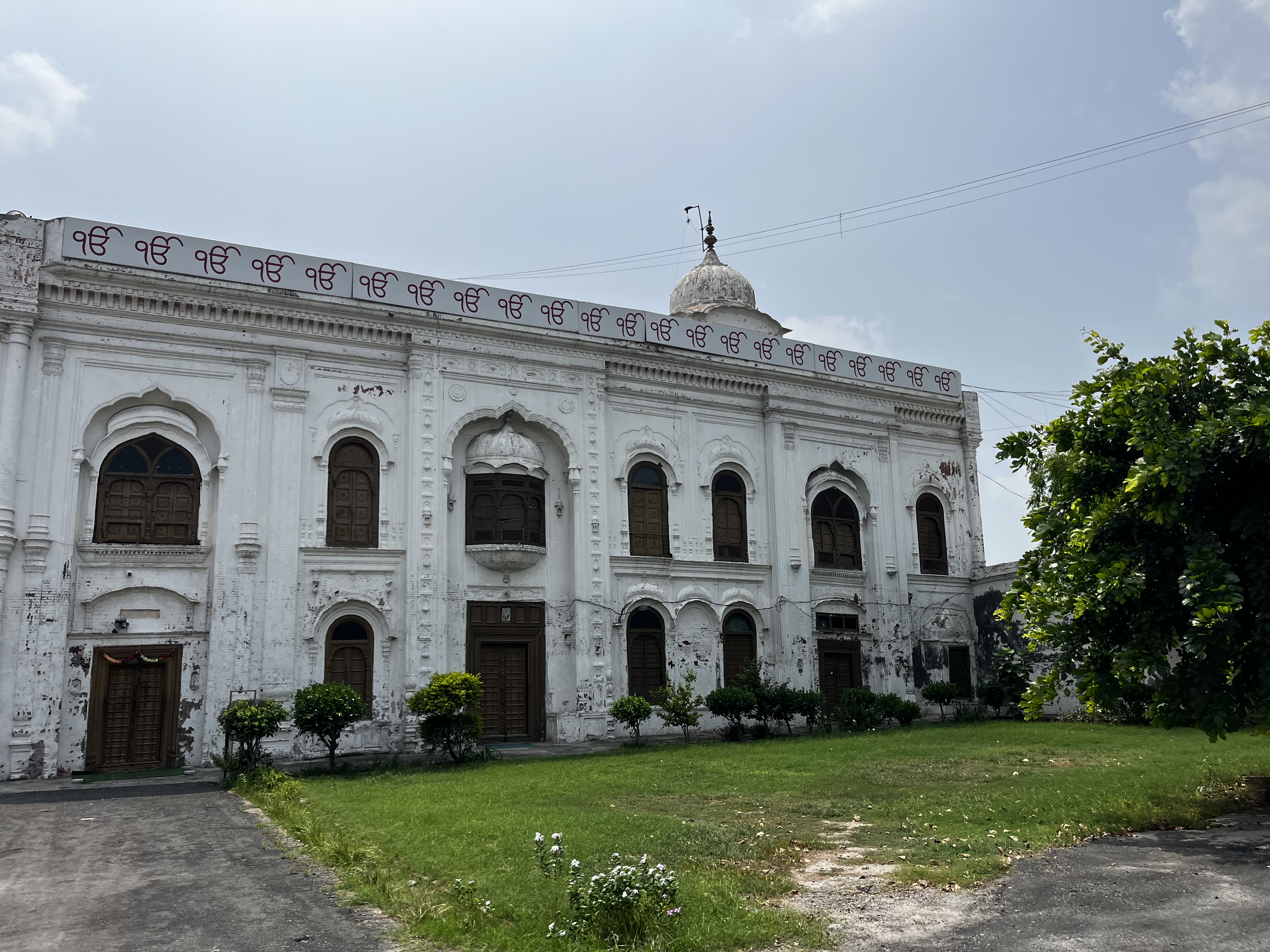
The Pothi-Mala shrine of Guru Har Sahai, Punjab

The Pothimala building was built in 1705 and the locality of Guru Har Sahai was founded in 1745 by Har Sahai's father, Guru Jiwan Mal (born 1694), who was a direct descendant of the fourth Sikh guru, Ram Das, in the seventh generation. Har Sahai (1725–1750) was a direct descendant of the fourth Sikh guru, the Guru Ram Das, in the eighth generation. Guru Har Sahai was also the eighth Gaddi Nashin (custodian) of the pothimala, i.e. pothi (holy book) and mala (rosary), of the first guru of the Sikhs – Guru Nanak Dev. The lineage descends from Prithi Chand, elder brother of Guru Arjan and founder of the heretical Miharvan sect of Sikhism. The Sodhi clan of Sikhs consider hereditary appointed direct descendants of fourth Sikh guru, Ram Das Sodhi, as their guru or spiritual leader, whom they refer to as Gaddi Nashin. In 2010, Archaeological Survey of India (ASI) began the effort to restore the pothimala, the Pothimala building (including its 18th century murals), both of which are the property of the present Gaddi Nashin, 17th successor custodian Guru Yuvraj Singh.

The Hargopal subsect of the Miharvan sect of Sikhism is based out of Pothimala in Guru Har Sahai. They maintain a following to this day amongst the locals and remain held in reverence, being direct descendants of the Sikh gurus and custodian of rare Sikh relics of the gurus.

==== Kartarpur ====
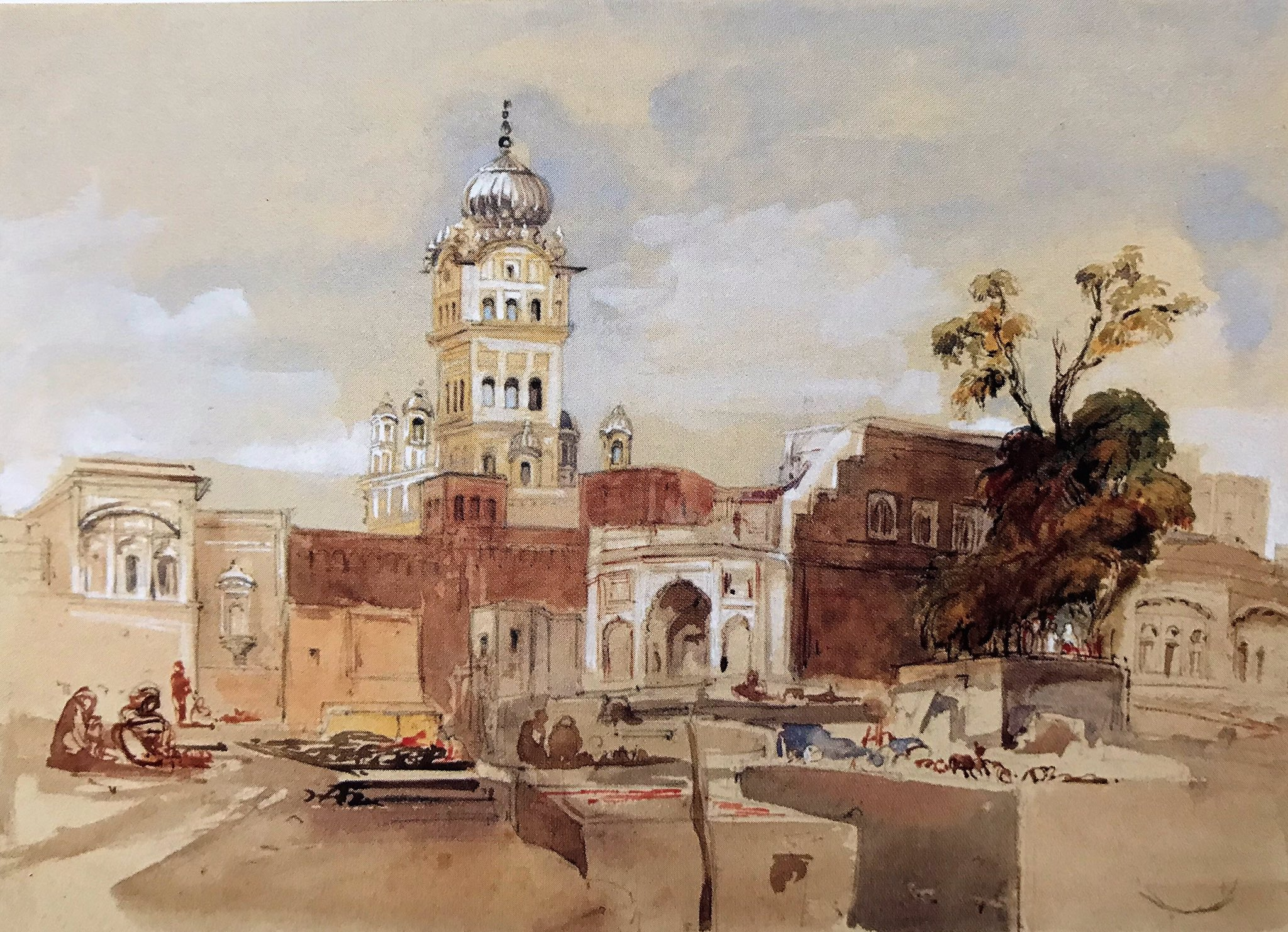
Watercolour of Gurdwara Tham Sahib in Kartarpur (Jalandhar), by Charlotte Canning, 2 February 1860

There are Sodhi descendants of Dhir Mal based in Kartarpur, known as the Sodhis of Kartarpur. They are known for claiming to harbour the original codex of the Ād Granth that had been dictated to Bhai Gurdas by Guru Arjan, regarded as the guardians of the work. Them possessing this relic has brought them influence and financial success. A festival held on the sankrant day involved the manuscript's public display at the Shish Mahal shrine, with money being offered to it by devotees being known as charawa. Another festival was held on Baisakhi at the Thamji Sahib shrine, with its Gangsar tank being used for bathing by pilgrims. Around 20,000 devotees attended the 1892 festival.

Painting of a Sodhi of Kartarpur on-horseback, circa 19th century

The original copy of the Adi Granth, also known as the Kartarpuri Bir, is reported to be in the possession of the descendants of Sodhi Sadhu Singh at Kartarpur. The codex, known as the Kartarpur wali Bir, was in the personal collection of the descendants of Guru Arjan until shortly after the establishment of the Sikh Empire in 1799, when it was forcibly confiscated from the family and brought to the Sikh court at Lahore. After the annexation of the SIkh Empire in 1849, the petitioner Sodhi Sadhu Singh requested that the codex be returned to his family, which were forcibly dispossessed of it by the former Sikh rulers. The scripture was returned and a copy of it was prepared for and presented to Queen Victoria by Sodhi Sadhu Singh as thanks. The copy of the codex is preserved in the Record Office, India Library in London whilst the original remains at Kartarpur with the family. The original codex at Kartarpur is displayed during major festivals and celebrations to pilgrims. Sodhi Sadhu Singh also commissioned a manuscript of the Damdami recension of the Guru Granth Sahib that was presented to the District Commissioner of Jalandhar in 1859.

== Gallery ==
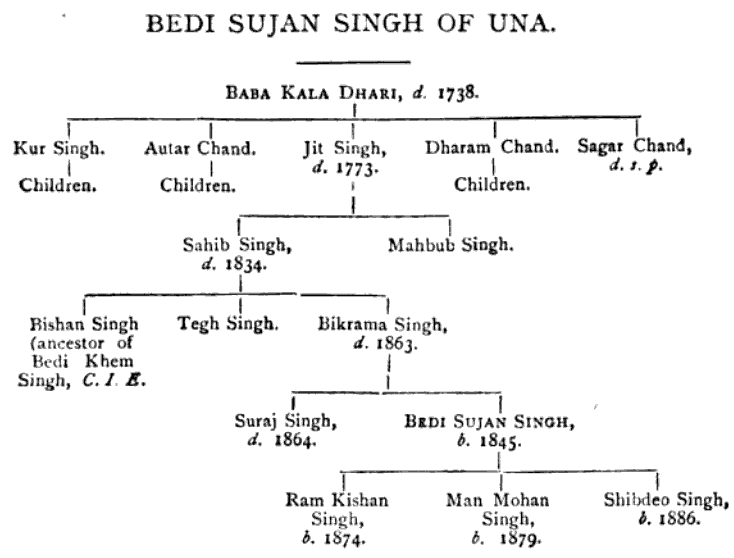
Genealogical pedigree (family-tree) of the Bedis of Una, from 'Chiefs and Families of Note in the Punjab' (1890)

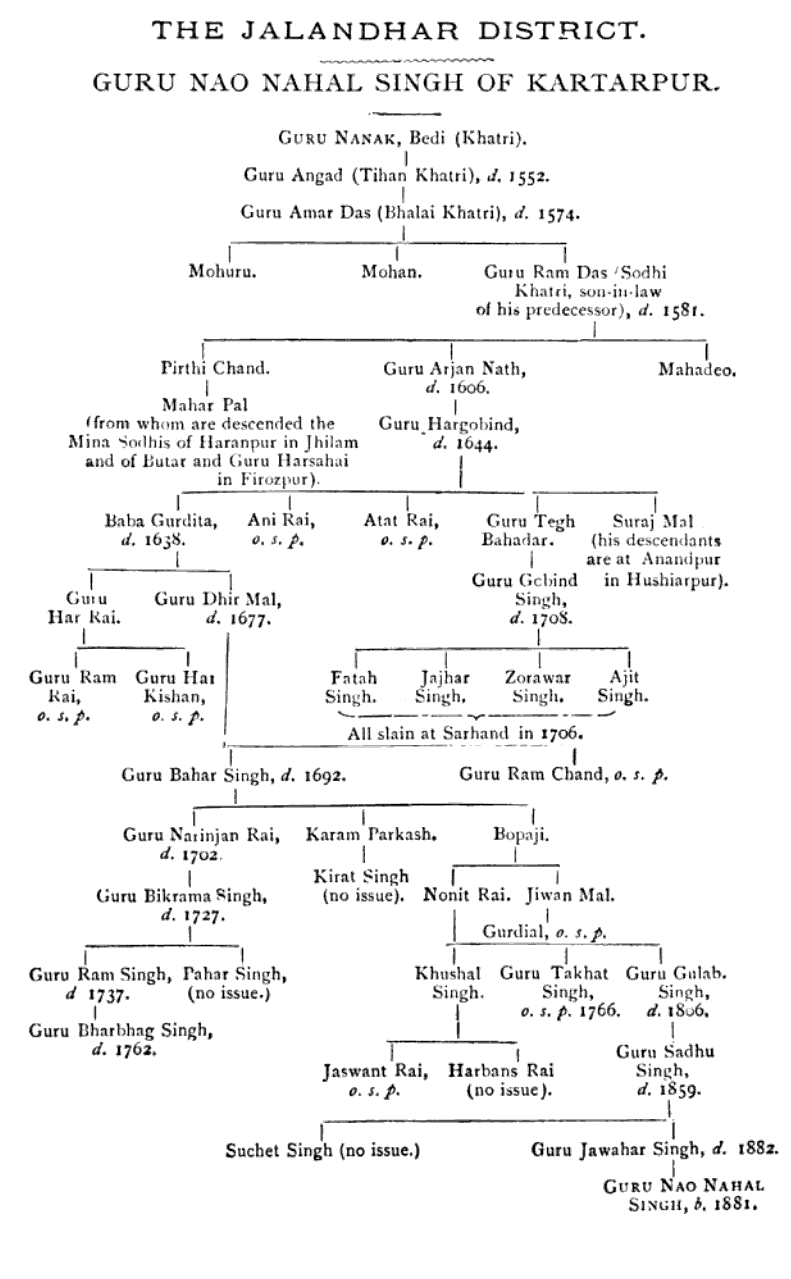
Genealogical pedigree (family-tree) of the Sodhis of Kartarpur, Jalandhar dist., Punjab, from 'Chiefs and Families of Note in the Punjab' (1890)

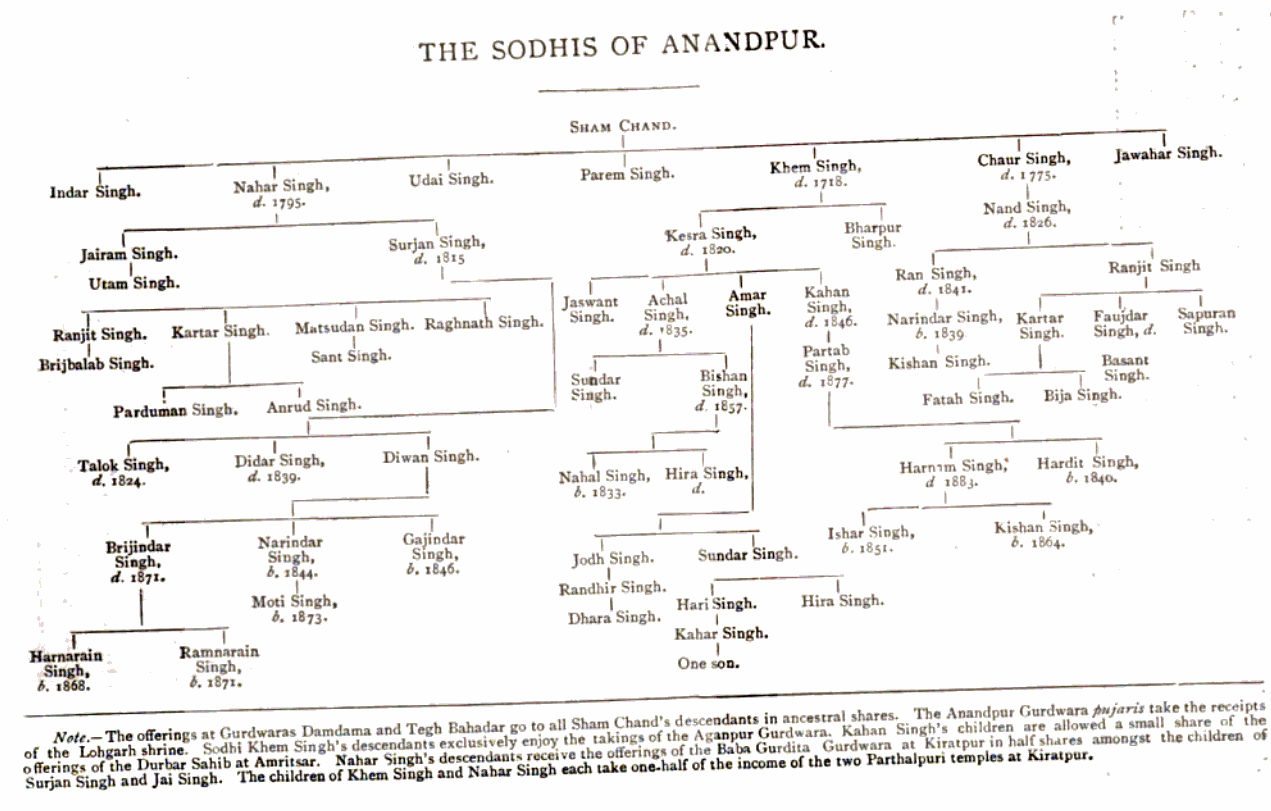
Genealogical pedigree (family-tree) of the Sodhis of Anandpur, Punjab, from 'Chiefs and Families of Note in the Punjab' (1890)

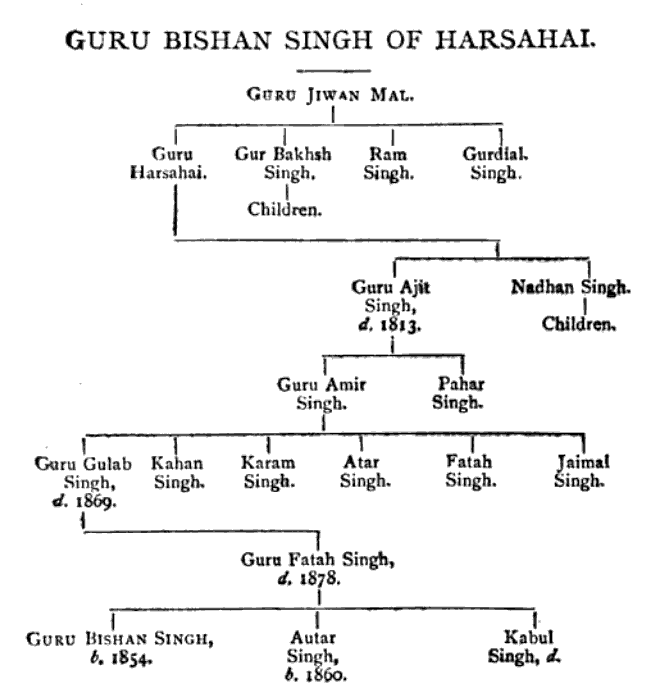
Genealogical pedigree (family-tree) of the Sodhis of Guru Harsahai, Punjab, from 'Chiefs and Families of Note in the Punjab' (1890)

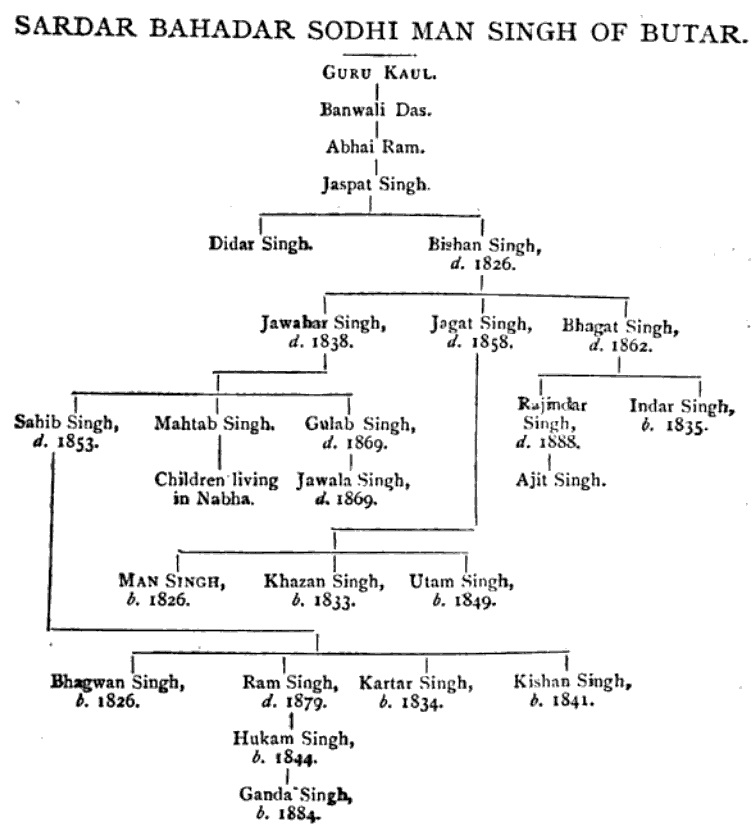
Genealogical pedigree (family-tree) of the Sodhis of Buttar, Punjab, from 'Chiefs and Families of Note in the Punjab' (1890)

== See also ==
- Gurpranali
