= Mahima Prakash Kavita =

Sikh text

Mahima Prakash Kavita, originally titled Mahima Prakash ("light of glory"), also spelt as Mehma Parkash, is a Sikh text written in Gurmukhi script and in verse documenting the ten Sikh gurus and Banda Singh Bahadur. The text contains 237 sakhis (stories) within it. The word kavita ("verse") is appended to the name of the work to differentiate it from another earlier work with the same name written in prose (vartak). The text was originally written at Khadur in 1776 by Sarup Das Bhalla. Although similar to them, the work is not classified as part of the Gurbilas genre. Both Mahima Prakash works were authored by the Bhalla tradition, whom were descendants of the Sikh gurus, specifically Guru Amar Das, with Mahima Prakash Kavita largely being based upon the older Mahima Prakash Vartak. The author claims to have sourced information from the descendants of the Sikh gurus and prominent Sikhs, and from other works, namely the Puratan Janamsakhi and Adi Sakhian.

As per Karamjit K. Malhotra, the work is "generally accepted" as dating to 1776. There were known to be four manuscripts of the work, MS no. 176 at the Languages Department at Patiala, MS no. 792/M at the Punjab State Archives in Patiala, and MS no. 3200 in the Khalsa College Library, Amritsar, with the fourth manuscript being lost during Operation Blue Star in 1984 as it was stored in the Sikh Reference Library. In 1970, the text was published by the Languages Department in Patiala. English translations of select sections of the text can be found at manglacharan.com.

According to Pashaura Singh, the fact that the author, Sarup Das, was a descendant of Guru Amar Das makes the work biased toward their lineage as he attempts to aggrandize his ancestry and improve the status of the guru descendants in-general in the 18th century Sikh society. In-order to effectively realize this aim, Sarup Das had to attempt to "rehabilitate" the poor image of the Minas, Dhirmalias, and Ramraiyas in the text, as those sects were founded by guru descendants but were looked upon negatively by the Sikhs due to the injunction against them passed by Guru Gobind Singh.

The number of sakhis related to each personality in the work is as follows:

- Guru Nanak: sixty-five
- Guru Angad: sixteen
- Guru Amar Das: thirty-two
- Guru Ram Das: eight
- Guru Arjan: twenty-two
- Guru Hargobind: twenty-two
- Guru Har Rai: twenty-two
- Guru Har Krishan: four
- Guru Tegh Bahadur: nineteen
- Guru Gobind Singh: twenty-seven
- Banda Singh Bahadur: one
