= Dhir Mal =

Sikh religious leader

Dhir Mal (10 January 1627 – 16 November 1677), also spelt as Dhirmal, was a Sikh sectoral religious leader who was the son of Baba Gurditta and Mata Natti and grandson of Guru Hargobind, making him the nephew of Guru Tegh Bahadur and uncle of Guru Gobind Singh. He attempted to assassinate Guru Tegh Bahadur in his bid for the Sikh guruship. His Sodhi descendants remain in Kartatpur in Jalandhar district, where they claimed to possess the original codex/manuscript of the Ād Granth, known as the Kartarpuri Bir.

== Biography ==
Dhir Mal, a Sodhi Khatri, was born in Kartarpur (Jalandhar district) on 10 January 1627 and was said to have possessed a stubborn disposition as a child. Dhir Mal had accompanied his father and mother, who paid a visit to Budhan Shah, with a son named Har Rai being born to the couple after, who was the brother of Dhir Mal. When Guru Hargobind moved his family to Kiratpur, Dhir Mal remained behind in Kartarpur to take control of the estate, along with the original manuscript/codex of the Ād Granth. Dhir Mal had installed himself as a religious leader in Jalandhar, rivalling the mainstream lineage of the Sikh gurus, with Dhir Mal forming an alliance with the Mughal emperor Shah Jahan. Dhir Mal assisted the Pathan general Painde Khan against the Sikhs at the Battle of Kartarpur in 1634. Dhir Mal stole the original codex of the Ād Granth that had been compiled by Guru Arjan and Bhai Gurdas from the house of Guru Hargobind. After the death of his father, Gurditta, the Sikh guru requested that Dhir Mal, residing at Kartarpur, to come to Kiratpur and bring the codex so a prayer could be conducted for his late father using it and for Dhir Mal to be physically present so he could receive his father's turban, which was a mark of succession to his father's property and position. However, Dhir Mal refused the invitation and did not come. In 1643, Dhir Mal received a revenue-free grant from the Mughal emperor Shah Jahan, who was aiming to create fractures in the Sikh community.

Guru Hargobind lost his eldest son Baba Gurditta in 1638. Shah Jahan attempted political means to undermine the Sikh tradition by dividing and influencing the succession. The Mughal ruler gave land grants to Gurditta's eldest son Dhir Mal, living in Kartarpur, and attempted to encourage Sikhs to recognise Dhir Mal as the rightful successor to Hargobind. Dhir Mal issued statements in favour of the Mughal state and critical of his grandfather. Hargobind died at Kiratpur, Rupnagar, Punjab, on 28 February 1644. Before his death, he rejected his eldest grandson Dhir Mal's politics and nominated Guru Har Rai (Dhir Mal's younger brother) instead to succeed him as the Guru. In-response to the elevation of Har Rai to the guruship, Dhir Mal established a rival guruship at Kartarpur and established his own masands to collect dasvandh donations. Dhir Mal taunted the mainstream Sikh lineage by claiming to have the original Ād Granth, the Kartarpuri Bir. Many of the Sikhs who became aligned with Dhir Mal, leaving the orthodox lineage, were from the Kartarpur region. He used the fact that he possessed the original codex to prop-up his sect. Dhir Mal befriended Ram Rai, the ex-communicated son of Har Rai. Dhir Mal and Ram Rai launched a joint complaint at the court of Aurangzeb over the choosing of Har Krishan, younger brother of Ram Rai, as the next guru to succeed Har Rai.

After the death of Guru Har Krishan at Delhi in March 1664, Dhir Mal attempted to sway the Sikhs into joining his sect with him as the new guru by establishing a court for himself at Baba Bakala, one of twenty-two major claimants to the Sikh guruship. After Guru Tegh Bahadur had been identified as the new guru by Lakhi Shah and Diwan Dargah Mal at Bakala, most claimants gave-up but Dhir Mal remained firm in his conviction to establish himself as the Sikh guru. Dhir Mal had one of his masands named Shihan to hire mercenaries to assassinate Guru Tegh Bahadur. During the ensuing attack, Dhir Mal himself (other sources state Shihan fired the bullet) shot at Guru Tegh Bahadur with a gun, who was injured but survived. In-response to the attack, the mainstream Sikhs, led by Makhan Shah, launched a revenge raid on Dhir Mal and his followers at their base, with them capturing the Kartarpuri Bir, Dhir Mal's personal possessions, and the offerings. When the Sikhs brought the loot back to Guru Tegh Bahadur, he commanded them to forgive Dhir Mal and return the looted property, including the Kartarpuri Bir, back to the Dhirmalias, with this being recorded in Gurbilas Patshahi Dasvin by Sukha Singh and in the works of Kavi Santokh Singh. The guru believed that he had no need to keep the original codex of the Ād Granth as per Sikh beliefs, the true Shabad resides in the current guru. Guru Tegh Bahadur may have been motivated to retreat to the Shivalik Hills due to the opposition he faced from Dhir Mal and his followers.

Several months after the execution of Guru Tegh Bahadur by the Mughal administration, Dhir Mal was called to Delhi and imprisoned at Ranthambore Fort, where he died on 16 November 1677. A shrine at Kartarpur dedicated to him is known as Dera Dhir Mal. Dera Guru Bhadbhag Singh Sodhi Ji claims that Dhir Mal had two sons, named Bahar Singh Sodhi (b. 1692) and Ram Singh Sodhi.

The Damdami Taksal claims that Guru Gobind Singh instructed Deep Singh and other Sikhs to visit Dhir Mal to request the original codex, the Kartarpuri Bir, however Dhir Mal is said to have responded by taunting Guru Gobind Singh to prepare a copy of the scripture by memory if he is really the true guru. In-response, the Sikh guru is said to have prepared the Damdami recension of the scripture. After the founding of the Khalsa, Guru Gobind Singh classified the Dhirmalias as one of the Panj Mel, groups which Sikhs are to avoid and shun completely.

== Dhirmalias ==
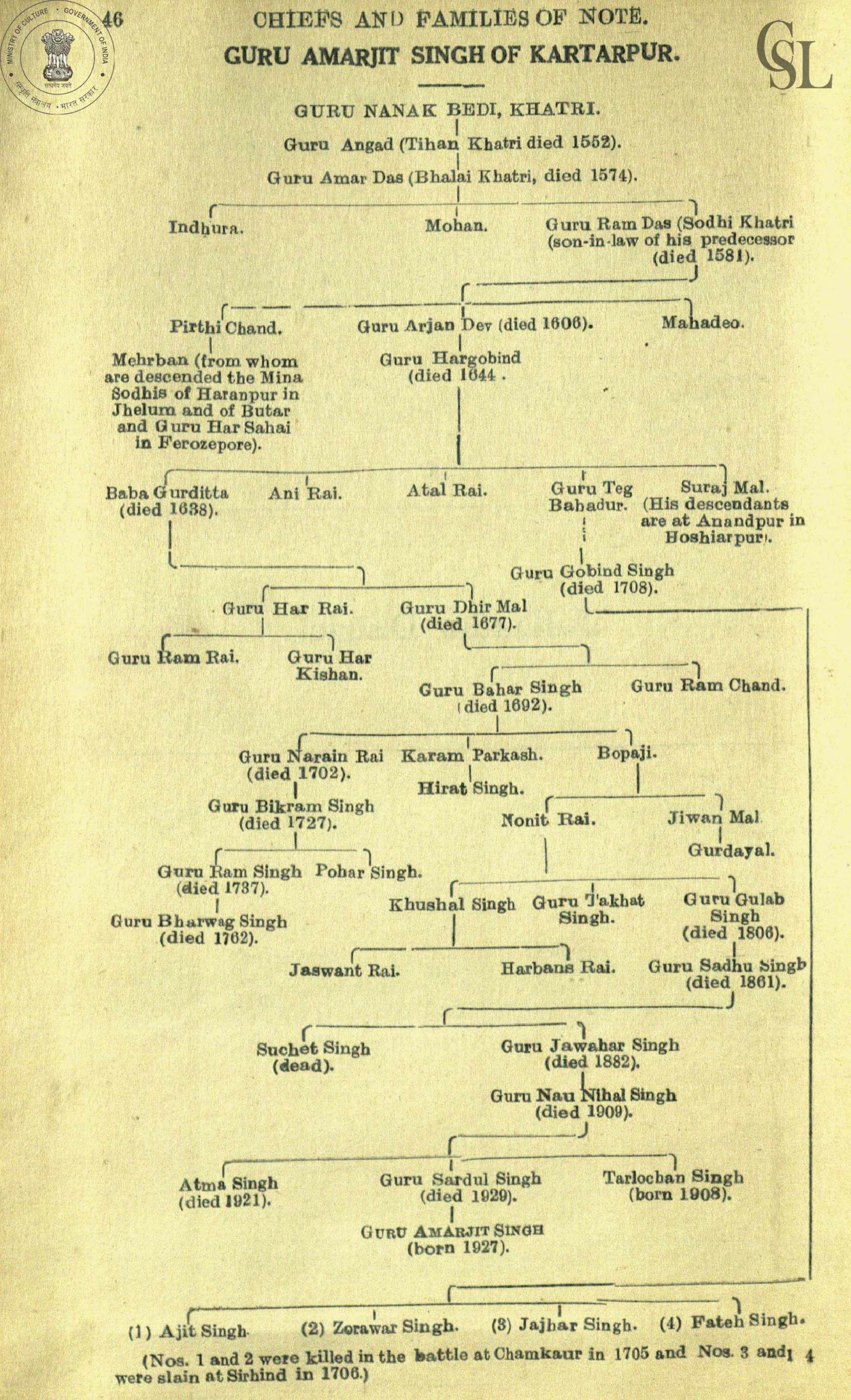
Genealogical pedigree (family-tree) of the Sodhi family of Kartarpur, Punjab, revised pedigree-table (1940)

The Dhirmalias were a heretical sect founded by Dhir Mal, the eldest son of Gurditta and grandson of Guru Hargobind. Dhir Mal is considered a traitor by mainstream Sikhs due to his greed for the guruship, wealth, and power. Guru Gobind Singh forbade his Sikhs from having any relation with Dhirmalias. A shrine dedicated to Dhir Mal is located in Kartarpur. Dhir Mal's great-grandson, Bikram Singh, would later give up connections to the sect and be baptised into the Khalsa order and become a mainstream Sikh. Vadhbag Singh Sodhi, an 18th-century descendant of the Sikh Gurus, was a prominent figure of the Dhirmalia sect. Vadbhag Singh became worshipped as a banisher of evil spirits, with a cult forming around him. Vadbhag Singh approached Jassa Singh Ahluwalia to re-consider the injunction that had been put in-place against the Dhirmalias by Guru Gobind Singh, with the Dhirmalias being allowed to re-join the Khalsa after some debate. Thus, in the second half of the 18th century, the Dhirmalias re-joined the Khalsa and the schism came to an end.

The sect was awarded the original manuscript of the Adi Granth, which was prepared by Guru Arjan and his scribe Bhai Gurdas, in 1643. This manuscript is known as the Kartarpur Bir. The Sodhis of Kartarpur claim to be their descendants and have in their possession the manuscript. Maharaja Ranjit Singh took possession of the original codex and had it installed at his personal gurdwara in Lahore Fort. However, after British annexation of the Punjab in 1849, the codex was returned to the Sodhis of Kartarpur led by Sodhi Sadhu Singh in 1850 upon their request for it. It remains with them today and is installed at Gurdwara Thum Sahib. Sadhu Sing had an estate in the Jalandhar Doab worth 63,000 rupees and was restored to his jagir by the British for his support during the 1857 mutiny. In 1877, Sadhu Singh was succeeded by his son Jawahar Singh, who was not regarded well, thus his estate came under the control of the Deputy Commissioner Jalandhar. Jawahar Singh was succeeded in 1882 by Nau Nihal Singh. The current head of the Dhirmalias of Kartarpur is Karamjit Singh, who manages Gurdwara Tham Sahib in Kartarpur and other locations in Punjab and Himachal Pradesh.

== See also ==
- Descendants of the Sikh gurus
- Prithi Chand
- Mina (Sikhism)
