= Sanatan Sikh =

19th-century interpretation of Sikhism

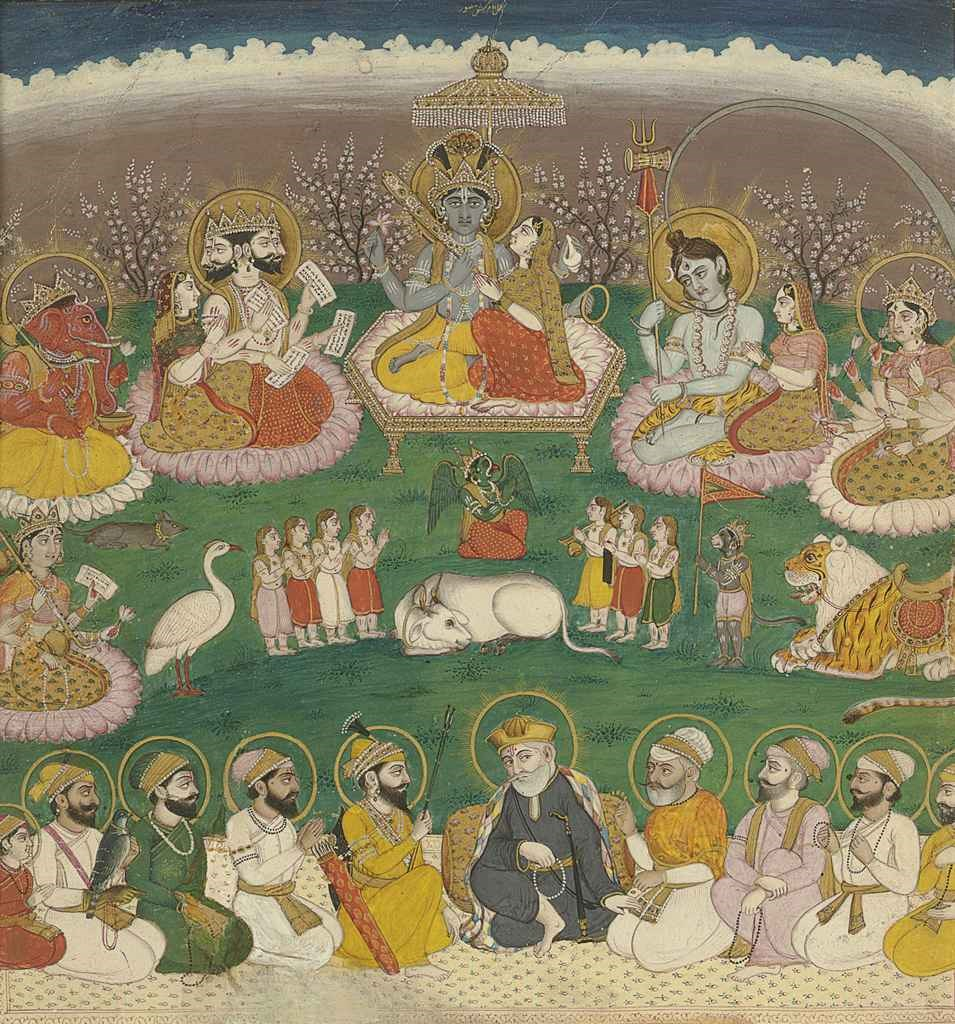
- Sanatan Sikh artwork of the Sikh Gurus with Indic deities, ca.1800–1850

Regions with significant populations
- Punjab

Religions
- Sikhism

Scriptures
- Sikh scriptures, Hindu scriptures

Languages
- Punjabi

Sanatan Sikh (IAST: sanātana sikkha, Punjabi pronunciation: [sə.näː.t̪ənᵊ sɪkkʰᵊ]), a neologism and hypothesis formulated by Harjot Oberoi in 1987, to refer to Sikhs who formed the Amritsar Singh Sabha faction during the broader Singh Sabha Movement in 1873. It also describes those who while nominally identify as Sikhs, continue to follow Hindu beliefs and practices. While W. H. McLeod considers the dominance of the Khalsa identity to last well into the 19th century, Harjot Oberoi sees the emergence of a "Sanatan Sikh tradition" that displaced the eighteenth-century "Khalsa episteme". It is a pluralistic and polycentric form of the religion that was responsible for spreading Sikhism amongst peasant masses via leaders and masters in the 19th century, being especially prevalent amongst the Sikh elites.

== History ==
=== 18th century ===
While the Khalsa was gaining political power in the 18th century, a large number of Sehajdharis began joining its ranks from around the mid-18th century onwards. Sehajdharis Sikhs practiced religion in a more fluid manner without following boundaries, in-contrast to the Khalsa Sikhs, which had always been a small minority. This presented a paradigm where as Sikhs gained political power, they further relapsed back into Hinduism. Sikh theology began to be re-interpreted under a Brahminical lens, such as in relation to the varnasrama dharma. Sikh rehatnamas (codes of conduct) from this period, such as Chaupa Singh's, are heavily influenced by Hindu practices, especially with regard to the status of women and interactions with Muslims. These manuals were more akin to the stridharma (moral system for women) laid out in Hindu texts, such as the Dharamshastra.

=== 19th century ===
Ranjit Singh's reign was marked by a move toward Rajputisation and the Sanatan Sikhs were favoured by him, thus the demarcations between Sikhism and Hinduism as popularly practiced became blurred and mixed, whilst Khalsa Sikhs remained in-charge of the army which allowed the Khalsa Sikhs to maintain some authority despite the state patronage of Sanatan Sikhs.

Around the 19th century, former terms such as sehajdhari began to be replaced by the term Sanatan Sikh. The Sanatan Sikh faction was led by Khem Singh Bedi, Avtar Singh Vahiria and others of the landed aristocracy. Theirs was an interpretation that accepted a wide range of beliefs drawn from Hinduism and Islam, including belief in the Vedas, idols, Hindu epics, and Sufi pirs. According to Oberoi, the interpretation "deeply transformed Sikh thinking and practices." Sanatan Sikhism in the 19th century was spread by various holy-men, known as bhais, babas, sants, and rarely as gurus (guru as a term was used for Bedi and Sodhi descendants and used amongst the Nirmala sect). As per Oberoi, guru-lineages, holy-men, and traditional intellectuals were the proponents of this interpretation of Sikhism. A difference between the guru lineages and the holy-men, were that the guru-lineages inherited their sacred status while the holy-men acquired it during their lifetime (however some lineages of holy-men would develop, such as the Bhais of Bagrian).

Sikh depiction from a Guru Granth Sahib manuscript of Mahakal and Mahakali with Sodhi Bhan Singh paying respects.

The guru-lineages consisted of individuals who were descendants of the Sikh gurus (consisting of priests, soldiers, and politicians who hailed from the Bedi, Trehan, Bhalla, and Sodhi gots of the Khatris), whom were popularly worshipped by the contemporary Sikh community in the 18th and 19th centuries. These descendants were patronized by Sikh rulers of their era (by bestowing jagir and dharmarth grants upon them while some received salaries for their service) and helped propagate their interpretation of Sikhism by establishing their own deras and centering seasonal festivals (melas) around their custodianship of sacred Sikh relics. The Sikh kin groups which offered patronage to these guru-lineages were gradually converted to or initiated into Sanatan Sikhism by the lineages. This is a form of the religion that Oberoi terms Guru-Sikhi, consisting of a "dyadic relationship". However, outside of these patronage circles, the influence of guru-lineages varied amongst the general populace depending on the charisma of its current head and their relationship to the ruling administration.

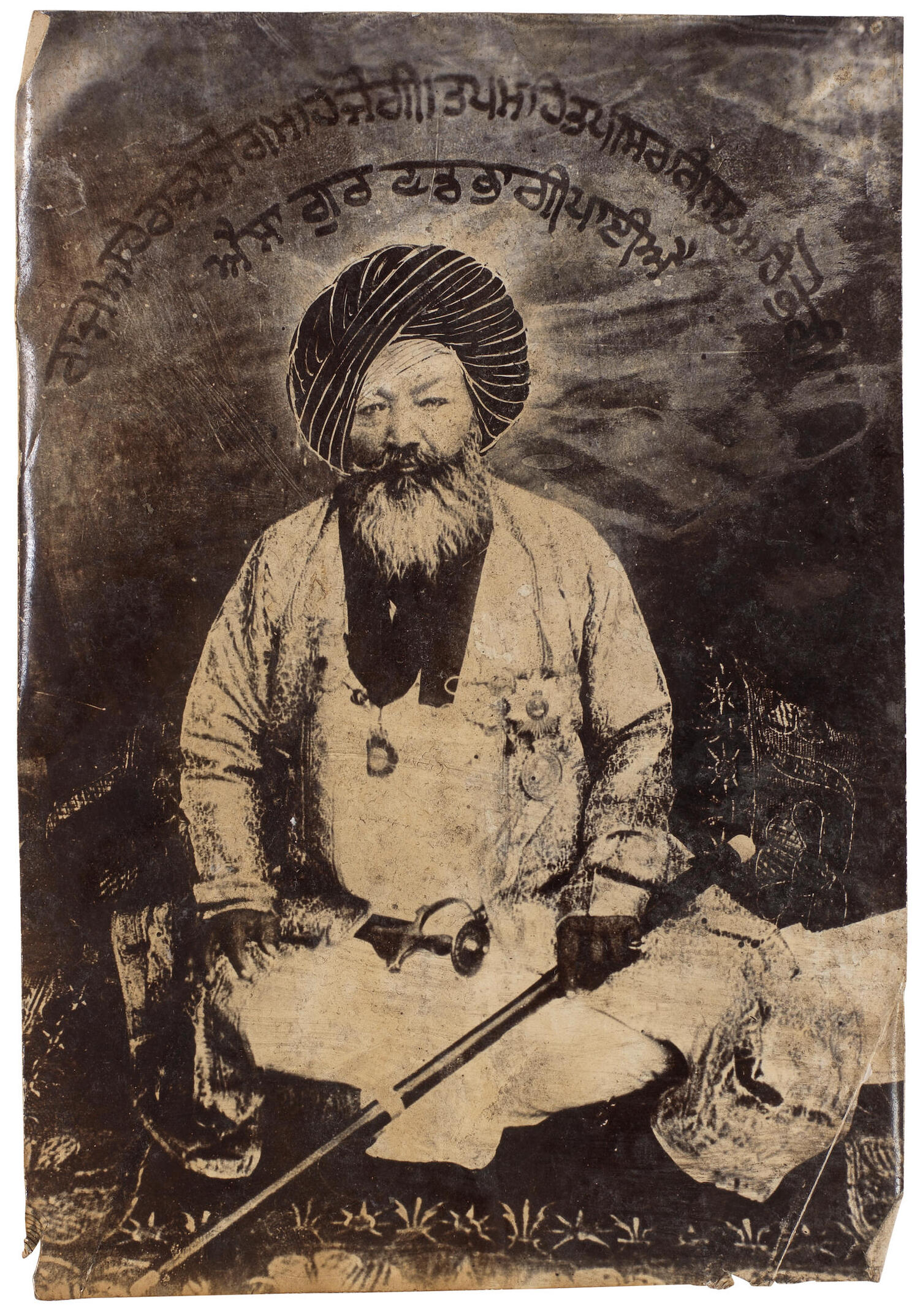
Baba Khem Singh Bedi, a leader of the Amritsar Singh Sabha and direct descendant of Guru Nanak

The second force responsible for the proliferation of Sanatan Sikhism in the 19th century were holy-men (bhais, sants, and babas). Their influence spread amongst the populace via oral traditions and they transformed the religion into a "living tradition". Sikh peasants acquired their knowledge on Sikhism through the teachings and actions of these holy-men imbued in folklore as they seldom had access to formal Sikh education and may have not undergone the intitiation ceremony. These holy-men were venerated as miracle-workers, requested for blessings, respected for their religiousity, and treasured for their ability to perform exposition on hymns of the Sikh scriptures when acting as a granthi. While many holy-men have existed in the Sikh tradition since the period of the human Sikh gurus, some of them came to hold large amounts of influences during Sikh-rule, such as in the court of Maharaja Ranjit Singh. Martial and political successes of some Sikh chiefs were attributed to the blessings they had received from such holy-men.

The third factor in the promulgation of Sanatan Sikhism were traditional intellectual sections of the Sikhs. These were Udasis, Nirmalas, Gianis, Granthis, Pujaris, Dhadis, Rababis, and Ardasias. By the mid-19th century, there were around 250 Udasi establishments in Punjab (probably more than this, as this figure is for the ones being officially supported) providing traditional instruction and conducting missionary work. Between the 1790s and 1840s, the number of Udasi establishments rose by 500% due to official state support. The Nirmalas were also prevalent, especially in Malwa where they had established an akhara in 1861 under the support of the local Sikh rulers. Many prominent writers belonged to the Nirmala order whose works consisted of a Sanatanist bent, such as Tara Singh Narotam. According to Oberoi, the Udasis and Nirmalas were critical for spreading Sanatan Sikhism in the peripheral areas outside the core region of traditional Sikhism (central Punjab) through the establishment of monastic centres. Many Nirmalas and Udasis were historians, teachers, authors, doctors, translators, transcribers, and exagetes. The traditional, indigenous schools operated by them provided learning to students of various social and religious backgrounds, with a network of akharas and bungas in various settlements. Visitors to the Golden Temple at Amritsar would be exposed to Sanatan Sikh preachings from the local bungas operated by these sects.

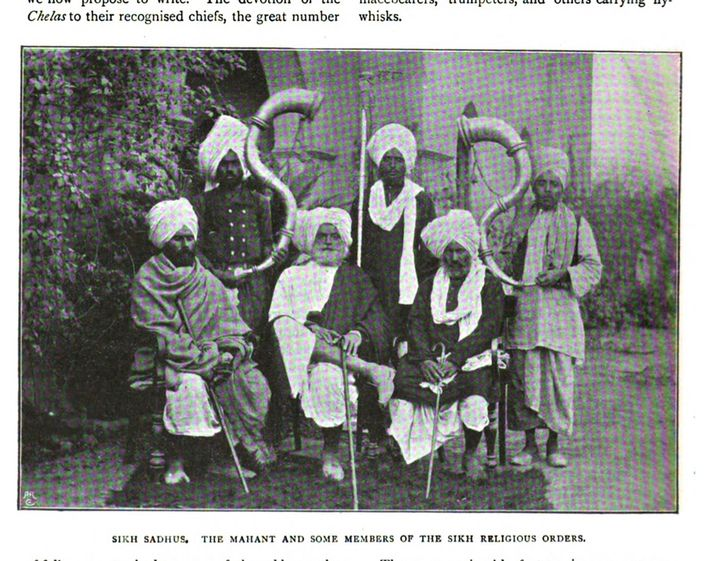
Photograph of Udasi mahants ("Sikh sadhus") and members of Sikh religious orders, published in 'The Mission Field' (1904)

The second section consisted of religious support staff, the Gianis, Granthis, Pujaris, Dhadhis, Rababis, and Ardasias. The Dastūr-ul-āmal document formulated in 1859 by the British administrators bestowed custodianship over the central site of the Golden Temple in Amritsar's accounts and offerings to the Pujaris, whom were a class of priests involved with ritual services at shrines. The Gianis were a lineage of exegetes who were responsible for explaining the Sikh scriptures and theology, with the most notable lineage being of Giani Ram Singh in Amritsar, whose descendants were the Golden Temple's superintendent until 1921. The Gianis were more specialized in their exegesis tradition than the bhais.

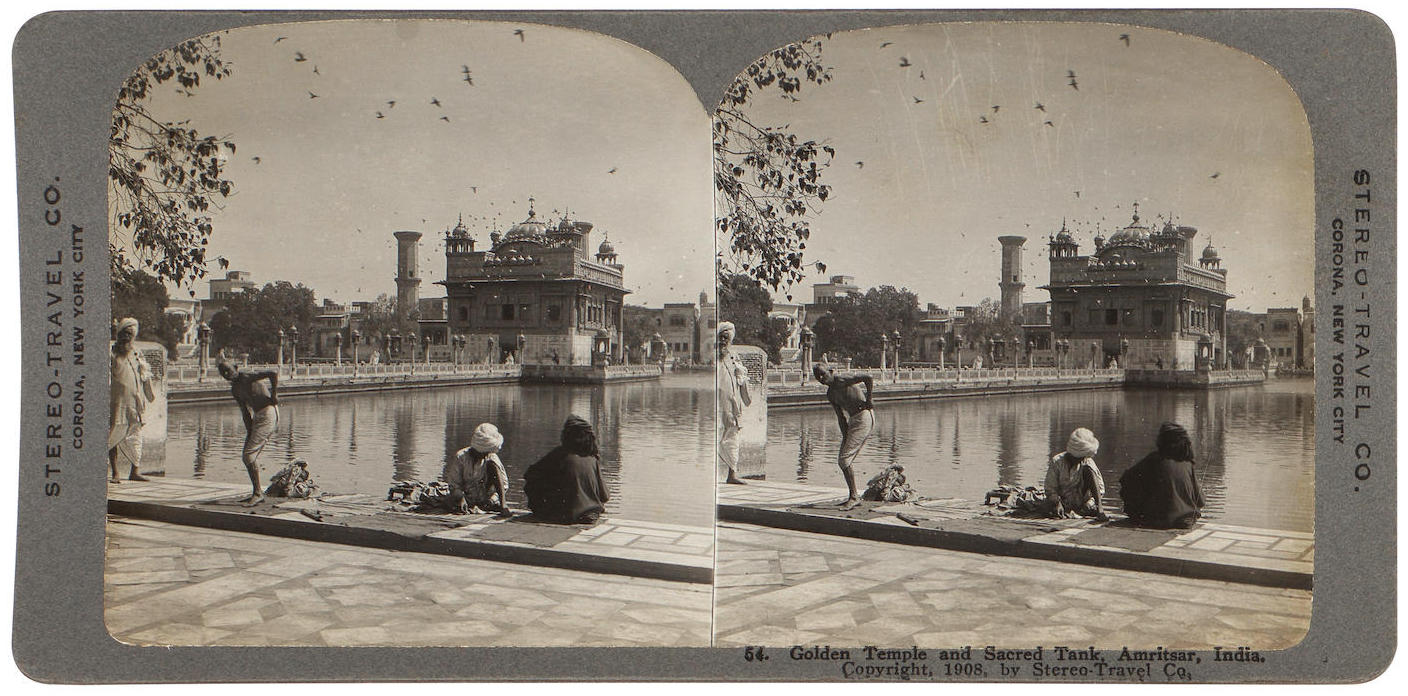
Golden Temple, Amritsar, 1908

Under its auspices, Hindu priests publicly worshipped idols and images in the Golden Temple precincts, and it was considered legitimate to worship living Gurus, descendants of Sikh gurus and other prominent ancestries who had "inherited their charisma." In addition to himself, Khem Singh claimed special reverence for all members of clans to which the Gurus had belonged. For these groups the principle of authority of Sikh tradition was invested in living gurus (as Khem Singh Bedi, their leader, liked to be regarded) rather than the principle of shabad guru, or the Guru Granth Sahib as the Guru, which was upheld by the dominant Khalsa tradition. The Sanatan Sikhs supported the Dasam Granth as being an authentic scripture, whilst the Tat Khalsa rejected it. Amid factional rivalry, the influence of the dominant Tat Khalsa ("true Khalsa"), due to the support of the Sikh masses, resulted in the decline of this socioreligious faction.

== See also ==
- Keshdhari Hindus
- Rashtriya Sikh Sangat
- Sikh sects
- Hinduism and Sikhism
