= Khem Singh Bedi =

Social reformer and founder of the Amritsar Singh Sabha (1832–1905)

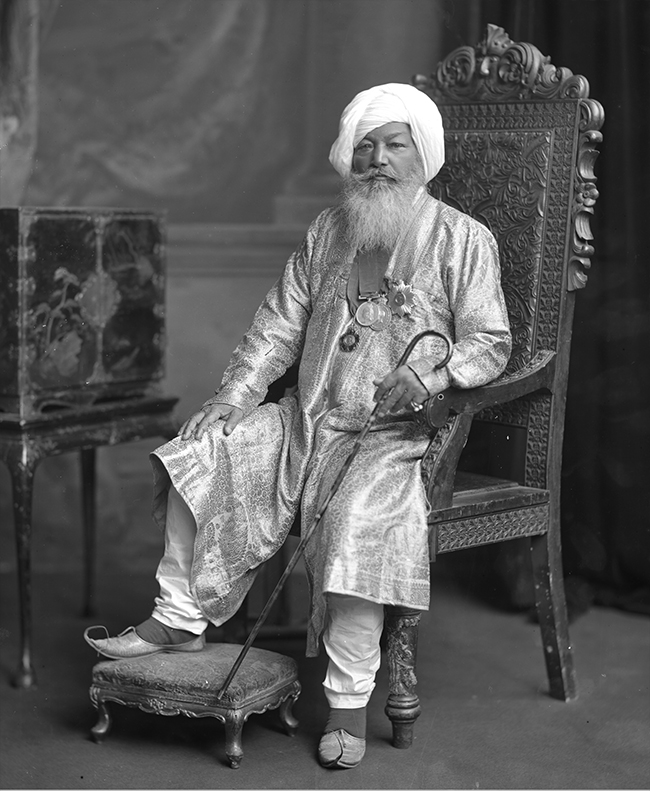
Sir Baba Khem Singh Beda (or Bedi) of Kullar (1830-1905), photographed in 1902

Sir Khem Singh Bedi KCIE (21 February 1832 – 10 April 1905) was a claimed direct descendant of Guru Nanak, a leader, and the founder of the Amritsar Singh Sabha in 1873. It instituted many charitable causes for Sikhs, was a landowner and politician in the Punjab during the British Raj.

== Family background and early life ==
Bedi was born in Kallar Syedan in the Rawalpindi District in 1832. He claimed to be the thirteenth direct descendant of Guru Nanak Dev, the founder of Sikhism. His father Baba Attar Singh was killed in a family feud on 25 November 1839 with Bikram Singh Bedi, and Khem Singh Bedi along with his elder brother Sampuran Singh inherited jagirs in the Doaba region along with 41 villages in Depalpur Tehsil. Bedi held his jagirs in 4 villages of Dipalpur tahsil, while his elder brother was given jagirs in 22 villages of the same tahsil. Following the annexation of the Punjab by the East India Company in 1849, 14 of those villages were appropriated by the new administration.

== Career ==
In 1855, the Punjab administration established the Department of Public Instruction with the aim to open 30 single-teacher primary schools across the Punjab. Bedi lent his full support to the scheme, additionally opening his own schools in Rawalpindi. At least fifty schools for boys and girls were opened in the Punjab with his assistance.

During the Indian Mutiny of 1857, Bedi helped British troops quell an uprising in Gugera. He distinguished himself in a cavalry charge on 21 September 1857, and the following day narrowly escaped an ambush which killed the Extra Assistant Commissioner of Gogera, Leopold Fitzhardinge Berkeley. Following the rebellion, he was given a robe of honour and a double barrelled rifle.

Photograph of Sir Baba Khem Singh Bedi, Dr. J. Pollen, and Raja Pratap Bahadur Singh of Pratapgarh, by Bourne & Shepherd

On 1 October 1873 he co-founded the Amritsar Singh Sabha, the first of many competing Singh Sabhas during the Singh Sabha Movement, created in response to growing Christian, Muslim, Arya Samaj and Brahmo Samaj proselytising in the Punjab region. They campaigned for an inclusive interpretation that accepted wide range of beliefs drawn from Hinduism and Islam.

Bedi was a Sanatan Sikh (lit. "Traditional Sikh"), who maintained that "there were no essential differences between Sikhs and Hindus". Instead of treating the Guru Granth Sahib as the only guru, Bedi campaigned for acceptability of human gurus to guide Sikhs, which resulted in Khem Singh Bedi considering himself the Guru. The main text of the Sanatan Sikh was Dasam Granth created in 19th century. The dispute intensified and by the early decades of the 20th century, the influence of the panth was given to the Tat Khalsa ("pure, true Khalsa") resulting in the decline of Sanatan Sikhs.

Khem Singh Bedi held a grudge against the irreconcilable pioneers of the Singh Sabha movement, one reason for this is because they removed his gaddi (high-seat) from within the Golden Temple in Amritsar, which Bedi perceived as an insult.

[They removed] his gaddī cushions in the parkarmā of the Golden Temple from underneath him to show that the use of a masnad, a high seat, could not be permitted in the precincts of the holy Darbar Sahib, as the Golden Temple is called by the Sikhs, to any person, however highly placed he might be, and that they did not acknowledge him as Guru of the Sikhs.

— Lakhshman Singh, Autobiography, pp. 39, 58–9, 89–91

He was appointed a magistrate in 1877 and made a Companion of the Indian Empire in 1879. On the occasion of his daughter's marriage in 1893, he donated Rs 3,00,000 for religious and charitable purposes. He was nominated to the Imperial Legislative Council in 1893 and became a Knight Commander of the Indian Empire in 1898. Throughout his life he added to the land he inherited to become a substantial landholder in the Punjab. Towards the end of his life, his land possessions in the Montgomery District alone amounted to 28,272 acres.

== Death ==
He died in Montgomery on 10 April 1905.

== Haveli ==
A haveli (traditional Indic house) was constructed by Khem Singh Bedi in Kallar Syedan (located in present-day Rawalpindi district, Pakistan). It contains many frescoes depicting various religious and secular themes.

== Lineage ==
The direct lineage going down to Khem Singh Bedi from Guru Nanak is as follows:

1. Guru Nanak
2. Lakhmi Das
3. Dharam Chand
4. Mehar Chand/Manik Chand
5. Datār Chand
6. Pahar Chand
7. Harkaran Chand
8. Nihal Chand
9. Baba Kaladhari
10. Ajit Singh Bedi/Jit Singh
11. Sahib Singh Bedi
12. Attar Singh Bedi
13. Khem Singh Bedi

== See also ==
- Sahib Singh Bedi
