= Amritsar Singh Sabha =

1873 faction of the Singh Sabha movement

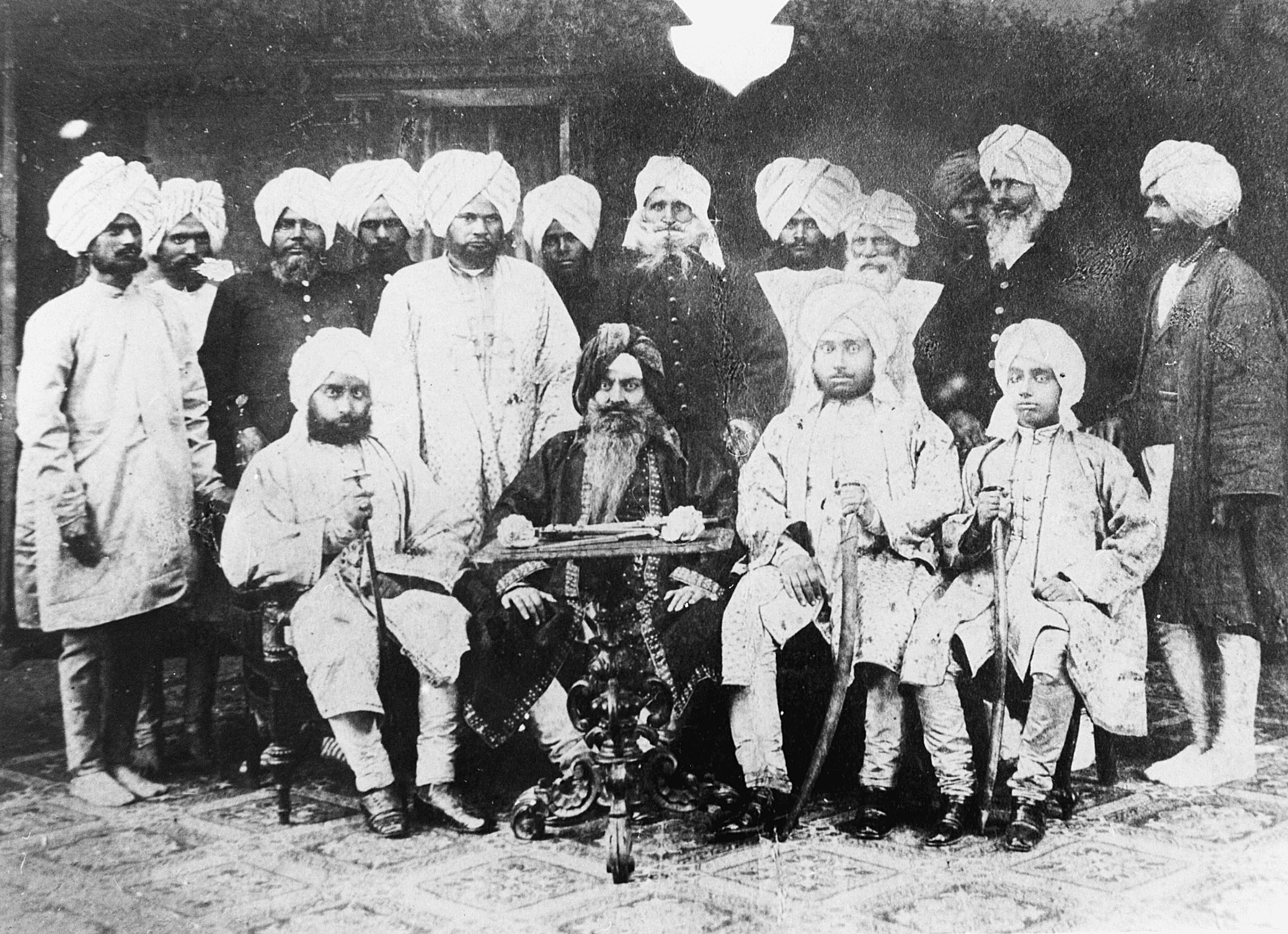
Sardar Thakur Singh Sandhanwalia (seated at the centre), one of the figures of the Amritsar Singh Sabha

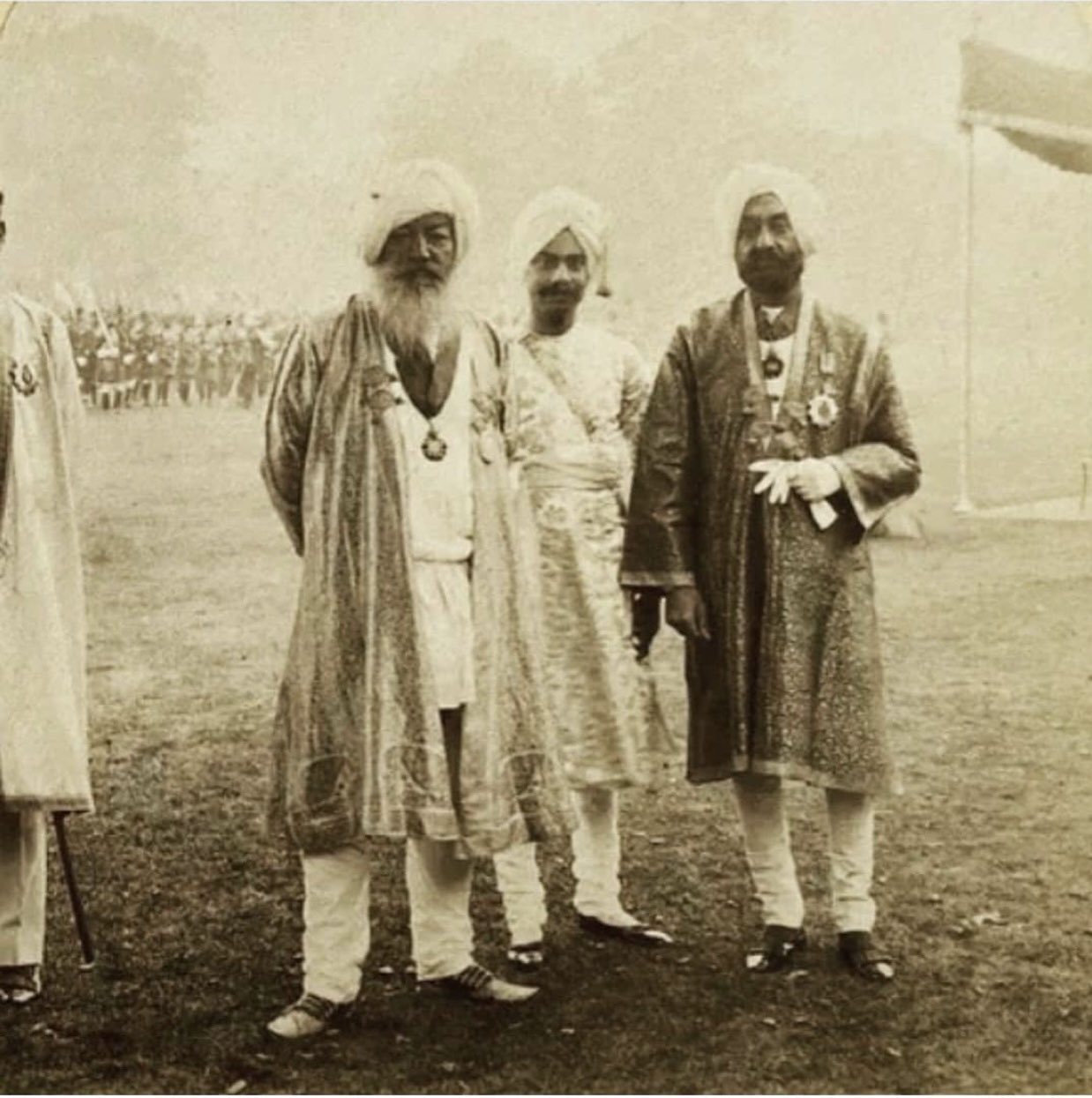
Khem Singh Bedi (left) photographed in London in 1902. He was a prominent figure of the Amritsar Singh Sabha

The Amritsar Singh Sabha was the first faction of reformers of the Singh Sabha movement, founded in 1873, and was one of the major groups who competed to reform and define the Sikh identity in the late 19th century. It was "essentially original and bourgeoisie," and "arose because of a perceived dissolution of the Sikh faith, i.e., Sikhs were believed to be falling into the folds of Hindu thought and practice."

== Origins ==
Having gained social prominence in the pre-British 18th- and colonial-era 19th-century Punjab by taking over gurdwaras and Sikh institutions, the forerunners of this faction were composed of what are now referred to as Sanatan Sikhs (a neologism and formulation coined by Harjot Oberoi). The custom of this faction, which had emerged from the duality between initiated Khalsa and uninitiated Sehajdhari identities, was only as old as the late eighteenth century, in the post-Sikh Empire society where Khalsa Sikhism was no longer the universal norm.

Non-Khalsa factions had gained social prominence following Khalsa persecution and loss of institutional control in the 1700s, and guided the operations of Sikh gurdwaras in the pre-British 18th- and colonial-era 19th-century Punjab because of support from Sikh elites and later the colonial British empire, remaining under the control of a "loyalist, landed elite with extensive ties to the British Raj." They were most prominent in the 1800s, and self-identified as Hindu, and were also the significant molders and primary participants among the rural masses of Sikh population.

== Views ==
This first Singh Sabha, called the Amritsar Singh Sabha, was set up and backed by a faction of Sikhs, Gianis, and granthis belonging to a Khatri background. They had rejected the Khalsa initiation practices like the Khande-di-Pahul ceremony on the grounds that it threatened their caste and polluted their ritual boundaries which they considered as primary. As such, they aligned Sikh tradition with the Brahmanical social structure and caste ideology; their predominant concern was to protect the social framework in which they held status. While this faction resented the democratic tendency within the Khalsa groups, they continued to co-exist within the broader Sikh panth, even as they remained aloof from the mainstream Khalsa practices. The Tat Khalsa's monotheism, iconoclastic sentiments, egalitarian social values and notion of a standardized Sikh identity did not blend well with the polytheism, idol worship, caste distinctions, and diversity of rites espoused by the Sanatan faction. Giani Ditt Singh, as a Mazhabi Sikh, was critical of Khem Singh Bedi's views on pollution, ritual, and lack of distinct identity.

For these groups the principle of authority of Sikh tradition was invested in living gurus (as Khem Singh Bedi, leader of the Amritsar faction, liked to be regarded) rather than the principle of shabad-guru, or the Guru Granth Sahib as the Guru, which was upheld by the dominant Khalsa tradition. Not subscribing to the idea of the Guru Granth Sahib being the guru of the Sikhs, but allowing the worship of images, living gurus, and even "charismatic descendants" of the Sikh gurus, who devotees would be expected to show the same allegiance as that of "a subject and his ruler," it was primarily a "priestly" religion with a strong distinction between intermediaries and the laypeople, and was essentially the "religious universe" of a small minority, the Sikh elites.

The Arya Samaj attacked the formation of a religious aristocracy among the descendants of the Gurus in their 1887 Arya Patrika publication, which the Amritsar Singh Sabha was characterized by.

Like the Lahore Singh Sabha, the leaders of the Amritsar Singh Sabha also appreciated the translations of Max Arthur Macauliffe.

== History ==
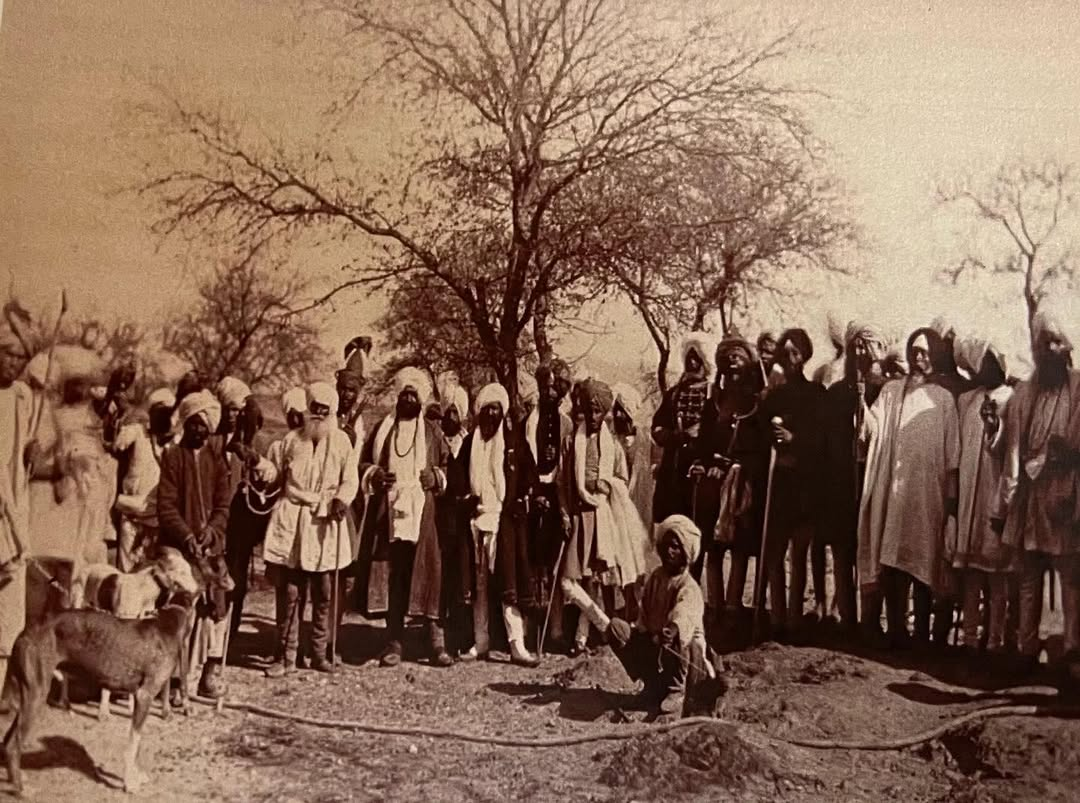
Photograph of Baba Khem Singh Bedi and followers on a hunt, Hasan Abdal, Punjab, 1885

They were opposed by the numerically predominant groups in the Panth, particularly those who held Khalsa beliefs, who through access to previously limited education and employment, had reached a position to challenge the Amritsar faction, forming the Tat Khalsa faction, or "true Khalsa," in 1879, headed by Gurmukh Singh, Harsha Singh Arora, Jawahir Singh and Giani Ditt Singh. They formed the Lahore Singh Sabha. The Tat Khalsa met with immediately successful organizational and ideological challenging of the Sanatan faction as early as the early 1880s. The body supported the Dasam Granth, with it forming a committee in 1885 to standardize the text, with it publishing its version in 1902. The Amritsar Singh Sabha was subsequently challenged and eventually marginalised.

== See also ==
- Khem Singh Bedi
- Singh Sabha movement
