= Mina (Sikhism) =

Heretic Sikh sect

Mina ਮੀਣਾ
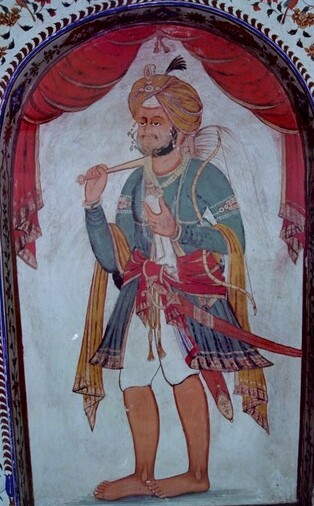
- Fresco of a Mina Sikh figure from Pothimala, Guru Harsahai, ca.1745

Founder
- Prithi Chand

Regions with significant populations
- Punjab (mostly extinct but a branch survives in Guru Harsahai)

Religions
- Sikhism

Scriptures
- Goshti Gurū Miharivānu

Languages
- Punjabi

The Mīnās (Gurmukhi: ਮੀਣਾ; mīṇā) were a heretical sect of Sikhs that followed Prithi Chand (1558–April 1618), the eldest son of Guru Ram Das, after his younger brother Guru Arjan was selected by the Guru to succeed him. Prithi Chand would vigorously contest this, attracting a portion of Sikhs to his side who followers of Guru Arjan referred to as ਮੀਣੇ mīṇe, meaning "charlatans," "dissemblers," or "scoundrels." They sustained their opposition to the orthodox line of Gurus through the seventeenth century, and upon Guru Gobind Singh's founding of the Khalsa in 1699, they were declared by him, as well as by Khalsa rahitnamas (codes of conduct), as one of the Panj Mel, or five reprobate groups, that a Sikh must avoid. They are occasionally referred to in the more neutral terms Sikhān dā chhotā mel ("those who remained with the true Guru lineage for a short time") or as the Miharvān sampraday (Gurmukhi: ਮਿਹਰਵਾਨ ਸੰਪਰਦਾ; miharavāna saparadā; meaning "the order of Miharvan") in scholarship. Minas referred to themselves in their writings as Sikhs.

They emerged as the only major rival sect of the Sikh Guru period, whose line of succession ran in parallel to that of Guru Arjan and his official successors. They controlled Amritsar and Harmandir Sahib built under Guru Arjan for much of the 17th century. Kesar Singh Chhiber wrote that Prithi Chand was edged on by his wife, who insisted that all the land and property should be his, which implies that Guru Arjan was given it, contrary to popular practice of the oldest child receiving it. It could be deduced that the claim of Guru was more of an economic claim than a theological one. The number of Minas rivalled that of the orthodox Sikhs and remained numerous in Malwa until the nineteenth century. The Minas gradually faded into the background of Sikh society in relation to the mainstream Khalsa, as Mina literati declined along with the sect. A surviving Mina group can be found in Guru Har Sahai, Punjab.

== History ==
=== Prithi Chand ===
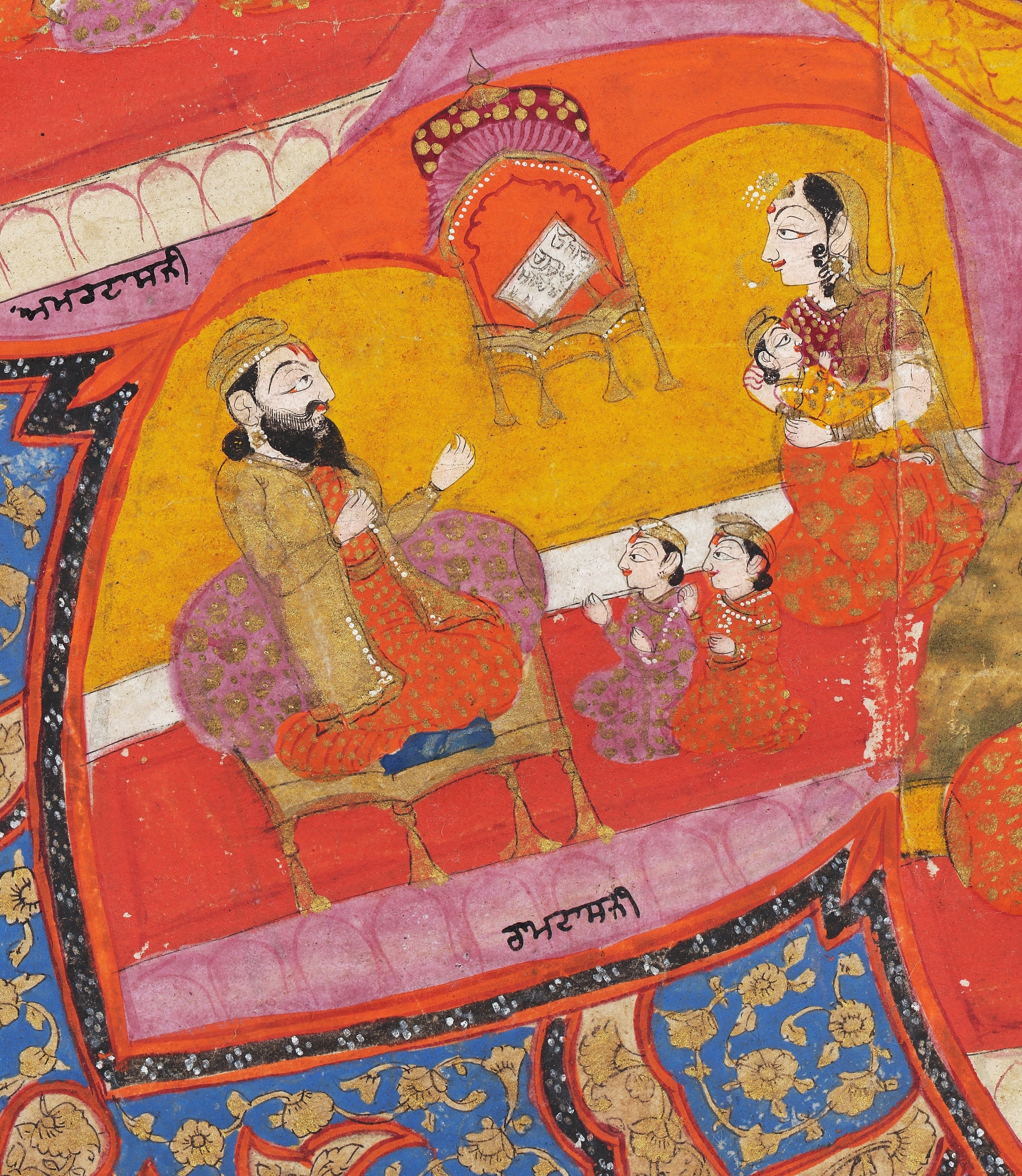
Detail from an illustrated Sikh scripture depicting Guru Ram Das, Bibi Bhani, and three sons: Prithi Chand, Mahadeo, Arjan Dev

Born in 1558 in Goindwal as the eldest son of Guru Ram Das, Prithi Chand felt that due to his position as such, he was the natural choice as his father's successor, though the Guru would select his youngest son, Guru Arjan (b. 1563), to succeed him. Prithi Chand refused to accept the choice. While eventually accepting the choice and acknowledging Guru Arjan's authority, supporters of Guru Arjan would consider this the period when Prithi Chand would start to feud with him. In the years following his father's death, Prithi Chand would grow bitterly opposed to Guru Arjan, for instance asserting that Guru Arjan had usurped his father's property; to counteract this, Guru Arjan would transfer his property to him, opting instead to live on his followers' offerings. In a ballad verse about the offspring of the Sikh gurus, for example, the influential Sikh figure Bhai Gurdas would comment, "Prithi Chand became a mīṇā (charlatan)." According to some commentaries, he would also taunt Guru Arjan about his wife's inability to produce an heir; when Guru Hargobind was born in 1595, an unsuccessful poisoning attempt would take place on the child.

The birth of the child seemed to dampen his spirits, and as his enmity with his brother grew, Prithi Chand would leave Amritsar the following year, first for Hehar village near Lahore, then to Kotha Guru village near Bathinda in the Malwa region of Punjab, where in the latter half of his life, where he would begin to compile a granth, or volume of poetry, of his own to compete with Guru Arjan's. He had witnessed the formation of Sikh scripture before Guru Arjan's compilation of the Adi Granth in 1604, and it has been argued that Guru Arjan's compilation was partially in response to Prithi Chand's ambitions, as incidents with Prithi Chand would impress the need to complete the manuscript as soon as possible so that the Sikhs would be able to distinguish the true verses of the Gurus from imitators.

Still having ambitions of becoming the Guru, considering himself to be more enlightened than Guru Arjan, Prithi Chand would make pragmatic alliances with local Mughal agents Sulahi Khan, a district revenue official, and Chandu Shah, repeating his claim of illegal usurpation of his position, and it has been suggested that this alliance may have had a role in Guru Arjan's arrest and execution. Prithi Chand's followers had also circulated accusations that Guru Arjan's compilations denigrated Islam, which would be dismissed by Akbar, who, after being presented with the compilation by Baba Buddha and Bhai Gurdas, would donate an offering of gold and robes to the book.

Prithi Chand even managed to turn the middle of the three brothers, Mahadeo (also spelt as Mahadev or Mahan Dev), who was a reclusive man with few worldly desires, against the younger brother, Guru Arjan, in-support of Prithi Chand, at-least for a period of time. Prithi Chand gained large support from masands and converted numerous Sikhs to his flock. This support allowed him to convert Gurdwaras and collect donations. For a short period Guru Arjan’s langar had stopped due to loss of followers and donations.

Guru Arjan, meanwhile, had completed the Harmandir Sahib with dasvand donations between 1581 and 1589, with the foundation stone having been laid by Mian Mir, (however, this legend involving Mian Mir is unsubstantiated by contemporary sources and is believed to be a much-later fabrication). creating a rallying point for the community and a center for Sikh activity, and created a place for the installment of the Adi Granth, the community's own scripture. He had also gone on a tour of Majha and Doaba in Punjab, founding the towns of Tarn Taran Sahib, Kartarpur, and Hargobindpur named after his son. Due to their central location in the Punjab heartland, the ranks of Sikhs would swell, especially among the Jatt peasantry, and create a level of prosperity for them; Guru Arjan would serve not only as a spiritual mentor but as a sovereign leader (sacha padshah) for his followers in his own right.

Following the death of Akbar in 1605, Guru Arjan's friendship and support for Akbar's grandson Khusrau Mirza (who was Akbar's favored choice as successor over his own son Jahangir) and the sudden growth of the Sikh population drawing from other communities amidst the resurgence of Persianate Sunni and Naqshbandi Islamic orders in Punjab which supported Jahangir, who in turn supported these orders, would contribute to Guru Arjan's arrest and execution in 1606. After the execution, Guru Arjan's chief votaries and prominent figures in Sikhism, Bhai Gurdās and Baba Buddha, supported the selection of Guru Hargobind, indicating that Prithi Chand was not the popular choice.

According to certain sectoral Mina literature, they accepted Guru Arjan as the Sikh guru and believe Prithi Chand was the successor of Guru Arjan, not his rival claimant. The Mina sources claim Guru Arjan passed on the guruship to Prithi Chand.

=== Miharvan ===
Prithi Chand had four sons: Miharban, Lal Chand, Nihal Chand, and Chandrasain. In April 1618 Prithi Chand died after passing on his breakaway position to his son, who became known as Miharvan, born on 9 January 1581. While being attached to Guru Arjan, he would follow his father in 1596, and receive an education in various languages and music, establishing himself as a more accomplished philosopher, writer on diverse topics, and kirtan performer compared to Prithi Chand, and more focused on expanding his community and challenging the authority of Guru Hargobind, traveling across Punjab and Kangra to do so, eventually settling near Lahore.

Miharvan had spent his days trying to woo patrons since he only had a small temple in Hehar and some Jagirs surrounding. When Guru Hargobind started a private army, emplyoing many from the peasentry of Punjab, the Minas had very little new to offer for the peoplle of Punjab. Miharban shifted to the Shivaliks to gain patronage from the Rajput kings who would be supportive of his works like Adi Ramayan, and the Muslim elite of West Punjab would be dazzled by his retelling of the story of Adam and Eve in Piran ki Vaar.

Miharvan would die on 18 January 1640, and despite fostering an enclave of supporters, would not significantly disturb Guru Hargobind's popularity either. Miharban had three sons: Kisan Mal, Hariji, and Chaturbhuj. He would be succeeded by his son Harjī.

=== Hariji ===
Guru Hargobind left central Punjab in 1635 following a series of battles with the Mughals, setting up court in the eastern Punjab hills. With the Golden temple left without an appointed custodian, Hariji used his lineage as Guru Ram Das' great-grandson to assert a proprietary claim to it. He would reside there his whole life, using the wealth to expand the Mina corpus and have his predecessors' writings manuscripted with the aid of Miharvan's scribe, Kesho Das, and transforming Mina thought by constructing a cult of personality around Miharvan by writing a biography of his predecessor, which no Sikh guru had done. His ulterior motive to do so was undermine the mainstream Sikh tradition by showing Miharvan's birth with the same grandeur as Nanak's, to depict his two predecessors as supporters of Guru Arjan, and to emphasise Miharvan's expositional ability, relating how Guru Nanak prophesied how special Miharvan would be in a sakhi, or story. Hariji died on 17 April 1696 at Amritsar, having made Miharvan the emblem of Mina Sikhism.

=== Schisms and decline ===
The Mina's fall from grace was during Hariji's era, his preoccupation with estorecism led to him having to vacate from Amritsar. Hariji's three sons would be evicted in 1698 on the orders of Guru Gobind Singh, and they would find refuge in their ancestral villages of Kotha Guru and Muhammadipur near Lahore. The Minas would subsequently begin to fade from history as the Khalsa order initiated by Guru Gobind Singh in 1699 would embody the mainstream Sikh panth as it began to assert itself against the Mughals and sent Bhai Mani Singh to take over the affairs of Amritsar after the death of the third Mina guru, Hariji.

Hariji's sons all led rival camps; Hargopal (Hehar, Lahore), Niranjan Rai (Gharachon), Kavalnarain (Dhilvan). Hargopal, the largest schism, later ended up dividing once more between his two sons Jivan Mall (Muhammadipur) and Kiun Shah (Haranpur), though it could have been cordial as well, this is unknown. After this, the Minas left Amritsar for the Malwa region of Punjab, where they slowly faded as an independence group and were absorbed into the mainstream Sikh fold. Jivan Mall had to flee from Muhammadipur after the invasion of Ahmed Shah Abdali, setting at Guru Harsahai. The descendants of Kiun Shah received patronage from local sardars and even Maharaja Ranjit Singh, though they were asked to take Amrit and stop being Gurus, which they did. By the Second Anglo-Sikh War the family was torn apart between supporting the Sikhs and the British, compelling one Mina, Nihal Singh, to plunder the house of his first cousin, Bhan Singh,

The Mina family were patronized by the Patiala, Jind and Nabha royal families and hence at the time of independence held around 70,000 acres of land till Land Ceiling Acts were set.

The Minas faded in the eighteenth century and is now mostly extinct. The sect still lingered on in the Malwa region but gradually disappeared by the mid-19th century. Today the only followers of the Mina Gurus are the Mina family, and even their Gurus have often rejected Guruship.

An ascetic sub-sect, known as the Dīvānās, formed out of the Mina sect in the 17th century and survived up until recent times. They numbered 841 in all of Punjab in the 1881 census but this number dwindled to 198 by the time of the 1891 census, a sign of the consolidation of Sikh identity during that era. They became subsumed as Sanatanist Sikhs in-contrast with the orthodox Tat Khalsa of the mainstream Sikhs. According to Charles Francis Massy's Chiefs and Families of Note in the Delhi, Jalandhar, Peshawar and Derajat Divisions of the Panjab (1890), there were two Sodhi lineages descending from the Mina gurus who settled in Malwa: one based out of Guru Harsahai and another based out of Buttar. Another Mina Sodhi lineage settled in Haranpur in Jhelum.

== Subsects ==
After the death of Hariji, the third Mina guru, in 1696, the Minas split into three groups: followers of Niranjan Rai, another group consisting of followers of Kavalnain, and yet another one of followers of Hargopal.

=== Niranjan Rai branch ===
Niranjan Rai was a son of Guru Hariji and was based out of Gharacho (Faridkot). The Brars of the Malwa region were amicable to his teachings.

=== Kavalnain branch ===
Kavalnain was a son of Guru Hariji and was based out of Dhilva (near Faridkot). According to Bhatt vahis, Guru Tegh Bahadur sat at the current premise of Gurdwara Thara Sahib close to the Akal Takht so he could greet Hariji and Kavalnain before he entered the shrine of the Golden Temple. This is in contrast with the mainstream Sikh narrative of the ninth guru being barred from entering the premises of the Golden Temple and being forced to sit at the spot which Gurdwara Thara Sahib now stands today. Furthermore, Kavi Santokh Singh writing in the 19th century claimed Guru Gobind Singh stayed at Dhilva with Kavalnain after the Battle of Chamkaur for a few days. It also stated that Kavalnain's grandson, Abhai Ram, requested to accompany the Sikh guru to the Deccan region until he was persuaded not to go by ascetics of the Divana subsect.

=== Hargopal branch ===
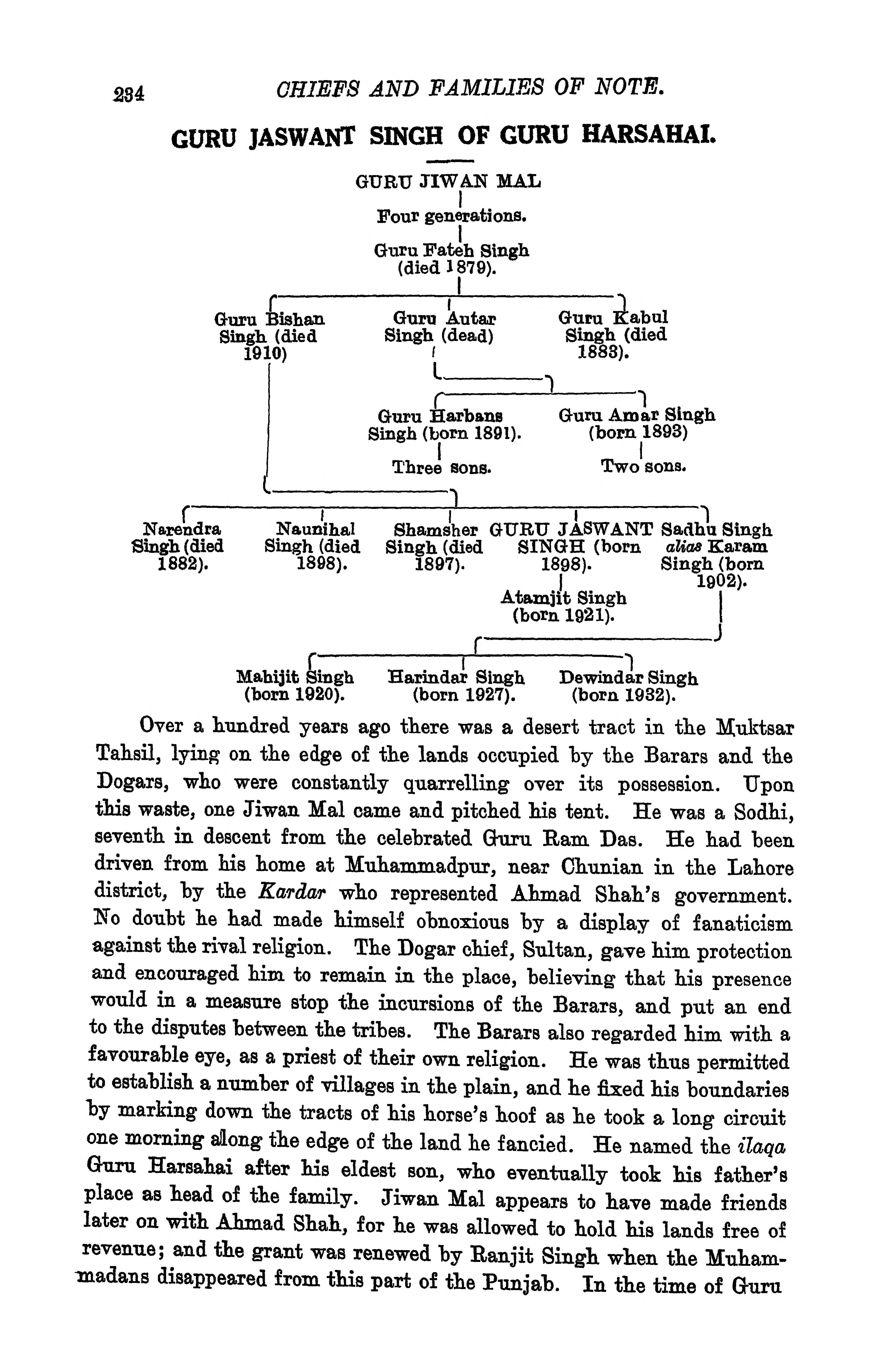
Genealogical pedigree (family-tree) of the Sodhis of Guru Har Sahai, Punjab, from Chiefs and Families of Note in the Punjab (1940 revised edition, vol. I, page 234)

Hargopal was a son of Guru Hariji and was based out of Muhammadipur (near Lahore). The Sodhis of the Pothi-Mala in Guru Har Sahai located in the Firozpur district of the Malwa region, who are the descendants of Prithi Chand and the Miharvan sect, come from the lineage of Hargopal. They descend from Jiwan Mal Sodhi, who was driven away from his holdings at Muhammadipur in the second part of the 18th century and subsequently resettled in the Malwa region under the patronage of the Mughal authorities to calm tensions with the Brar tribe of the area. The Sodhi descendants of Hargopal in Guru Harsahai still hold sway amongst sections of the locals of their area to this day. During the reign of Maharaja Ranjit Singh, the Sodhis of Guru Harsahai obtained positions of power in the Lahore Darbar of the Sikh Empire. In 1995, the then Guru Haresh Singh abdicated the guruship in-favour of his only son, Yuvraj Singh. They are referred to as Gaddi Nashin.

=== Dīvānā ===
An ascetic sub-sect, known as the Dīvānās, formed out of the Mina sect and survived up until recent times. It was founded in the 17th century by a disciple of Meharban named Bhundar Das (also known as Divana Sahib), and his own two disciples named Haria and Bala. They numbered 841 in all of Punjab in the 1881 census but this number dwindled to 198 by the time of the 1891 census, a sign of the consolidation of Sikh identity during that era. They became subsumed as Sanatanist Sikhs in-contrast with the orthodox Tat Khalsa of the mainstream Sikhs. The Diwanis later became absorbed by the Udasis.

== Discourse ==
Miharvan Sikhs emerged in a period of religious persecution and inner dispute within the Sikh tradition on the appropriateness of violence and non-violence in the pursuit of religious freedoms and spiritual matters. According to Hardip Syan and Pritam Singh, Miharvans emphasised more of the non-militant approach of Guru Nanak and earlier Gurus in theological pursuits, while the Guru Hargobind followers pursued the miri piri approach, or the fusion of temporal and spiritual power by which he could form an autonomous community, and began militarising the Sikh tradition to resist the Mughal persecution. Bhai Gurdās would describe this schism in the Sikhs, in which some would question Guru Hargobind roaming itinerantly as opposed to being based in one dharamsala or spiritual center, being arrested by the Mughal emperor of his time instead of being approached by them, being a hunter, and not contributing writings, finding these reforms to be a break with the mechanisms of sevā (service) and prasād (grace). Bhai Gurdās would emphasise the centrality of devotional service to the Guru, while sectarian literature would be concerned with defining themselves as maintainers of the precept of interiorisation. Bhai Gurdās would hold that Guru Hargobind "bore an intolerable burden and did not assert himself," justifying the new character of the court with the argument that to grow safely, an orchard needed the protective hedges of the thorny kikar trees. In other words, the panth of Nanak needed to assert force for its protection, in the wake of the execution of Guru Arjan by the Mughals.

They were the sole major sect in the 17th century in parallel to the orthodox Sikhs, but not the only sect; a lesser Sikh sect was the obscure Hindalis, who followed Bidhi Chand, son of Hindal, an Amritsar Jatt who became a Sikh during Guru Amar Das' reign, who would follow his father's path, becoming a chief official at a Sikh temple in the town of Jandiala Guru in Amritsar. He would lose his congregation after marrying a Muslim woman however, and so would establish a new panth in an effort to undermine Guru Hargobind, propagating his father Hindal to be superior to Guru Nanak, who was relegated to being simply a follower of Kabir. They would not impact Sikh society the way as the Minas did, leaving little behind besides a janamsakhi tradition and attempts to link their tradition to Bhai Bala, a Sandhu Jatt, as they were a Jatt-led sect. Despite the majority of the Sikh panth being Jatt, the Hindalis did not draw a large following.

The Hindalis, compared to the Minas, produced a modest volume of literary contribution. The competing works of the Minas and Hindalis provide insight into early Sikh society and thought.

== Literature ==
Prithi Chand's own literary output is sparse and difficult to date and attribute, as Mina texts have been interpolated by later Mina savants. The verses of his version of the Basant ki Var, while not compiled until probably the late 1600s, are believed to be genuine. A modification of Guru Arjan's identically-named composition, it divides Guru Arjan's composition and places the portions at various points in the text. Aside from his Basant ki Var, no other significant literary achievements have been conclusively attributed to him. His works, which largely imitated the style of earlier Gurus, can be seen as indicative of early sectarian works of the 1500s and 1600s, whose writers were often disgruntled relatives of the Gurus, passed over for leadership, whose imitations were attempts to assert their spiritual authority.

While Prithi Chand's writing style was that of an imitator attempting the style of the earlier Sikh gurus but without the same creativity, Miharvan's was more that of an innovator. Contributors after Prithi Chand would move away from imitation towards a style based on story and exegesis. Miharvan's output was more substantive, and relied on prose goshts, or discourses or sermons, in his writings, for example the Miharvan janamsakhis, which are divided not into sakhis but goshts. The compilation of 45 discourses, goshti Gurū Miharivānu, or "discourses of Guru Miharvan," would also begin to show a Vaishnavite influence in Mina thought beginning with Miharvan. His poetic style was such that it was made to resemble that of early Sikh gurus, using the pen names Nanak, Nanak Das, or Das Nanak. His successor Hariji would also use these pen names, and expand on Miharvan's established gosht tradition and attempt to further establish Mina authority. The Minas also wrote their own janamsakhis of the first four Gurus.

The Mina texts also misattributes Guru Arjan's verses variously to Guru Nanak, Guru Angad, and Prithi Chand's grandson Hariji, and added ten saloks, or verses allegedly written by the first five Gurus, though none of these appear in the Adi Granth. Alongside these verses are ones written by Prithi Chand and his successors, reflecting the Mina desire to create a clear chain of transmission from Nanak to the Minas and to legitimise the tradition, and which they believed to be a continuation of Guru Nanak's.

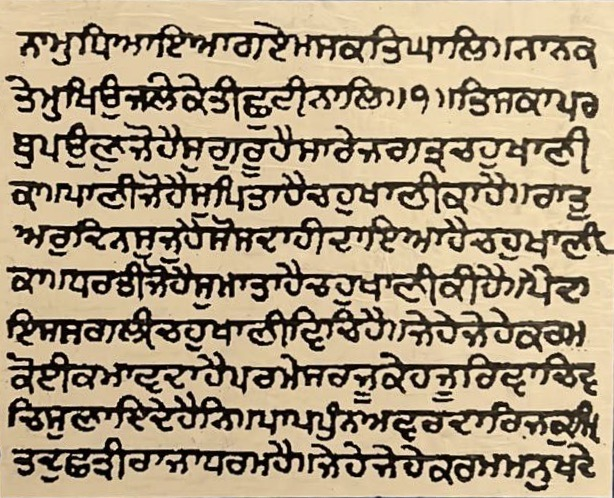
Hymns attributed to the Mina leader Harji

Sectarian literature of the 1600s was dominated by Miharvan's and Hariji's Mina writings, originally stemming from a visceral dislike of the mainstream Gurus. While they would blend Sikh and Vaishnavite ideas of devotion to produce a philosophy that exhorted Sikhs to integrate bhagati, or devotion, into the existing social structure, the mainstream Sikh Gurus, in contrast, would develop a bhagati in which Sikhs were empowered to challenge the existing social order. According to Darshan Singh, Miharvan and the Minas authored the first Sikh literature in prose. Miharvan authored exegetical works on the hymns of the early Sikh gurus, such as Nanak. While they affirmed the hostile Mina heterodoxy, they were also "genuinely objective and sympathetic" as per Darshan Singh. Miharvan authored an account on the life of Guru Nanak called Pothi Sachkhand, consisting of 153 goshtis (stories) and around 200 exegetical hymns. His exegeses are characterized by a lack of Vedic and Puranic influence, with the focus being on the meaning of individual words, with utilization of dialogue, context, and discussion to further explain points. Harji and Chaturbhuj had a similar linguistic style to Miharvan. Further descendants after Hariji, beginning with his great-grandson onwards, would form smaller groups like the divanas, or ecstatics, which would be patronised by the Patiala court, like Darbari Das, who would continue to propagate the Mina lineage but fail to get widespread support, as the tradition faded.

Miharban's writings were also repackaged from Dhanna's works and instead of Dhanna's seal, he wrote "Bhagti", which shows that they tried copying Guru Arjan's ideas of mixing previous tradition with modern. In another verse, Miharban suspiciously switched to Multani dakkane, a style and language popularized by Guru Arjan in Central Punjab, and again wrote one since line of Farid into his scripture without due credit. Miharban's successors Chaturbhuj and Hariji, both wrote under the name of Guru Nanak, hence the position of Chaturbhuj is unclear since there is no proof of him being a Guru.

Historians of the Mughal era recorded the conflict and contest between the Miharvan and the followers of Hargobind, such as in the Dabistan-i Mazahib.

== Leaders ==
Below are the names of the Mina Gurus that were followed by Mina Sikhs succeeding Guru Ram Das (according to mainstream Sikh and Hargopal Mina accounts) or Guru Arjan (according to Kavalnain Mina accounts):

No.	Name (Birth–Death)	Portrait	Guruship Term	Reference(s)
1.	Guru Prithi Chand (1558 – April 1618)		1581 – 1618	
2.	Guru Miharvan (9 January 1581 – 18 January 1640)		1618 – 1640	
3.	Guru Hariji (1620's – 17 April 1696)		1640 – 1696	
After the death of Guru Hariji, the Minas split into three groups

=== Kavalnain branch ===
No.	Name (Birth–Death)	Portrait	Guruship Term	Reference(s)
Succeeding Guru Hariji:
4.	Guru Harinarain		1696 – ?	
5.	Guru Kavalnain		?	
6.	Guru Harinanda		?	
7.	Guru Abhai Ram		?	
8.	Guru Didar Das		?	

=== Hargopal branch ===
No.	Name (Birth–Death)	Portrait	Guruship Term	Reference(s)
Succeeding Guru Hariji:
1.	Guru Hargopal		1696 – ?	
2.	Guru Gurditta		?	
3.	Guru Jiwan Mal (born 1694)		?	
4.	Guru Harsahai (1725 – 1750)		? – 1750	
5.	Guru Ajit Singh (died 1813)		1750 – 1813	
6.	Guru Hamir Singh (Note: Also known as Guru Amrit Singh) (died 1834)		1813 – 1834	
7.	Guru Gulab Singh (died 1868)		1834 – 1868	
8.	Guru Fateh Singh (died 1879)		1868 – 1879	
9.	Guru Bishan Singh (1849 – 1910)		1879 – 1910	
10.	Guru Jaswant Singh (1898 – 1971)		1910 – 1971	
11.	Guru Atamjit Singh (1921 – 1979)		1971 – 1979	
12.	Guru Haresh Singh (19 April 1946 – 24 February 2012)		1979 – 1995	
13.	Guru Yuvraj Singh (born 25 May 1994)		1995 – present	

== Bibliography ==
- Syan, Hardip S. (2014). "Sectarian Works". In Singh, Pashaura; Fenech, Louis E. (eds.). The Oxford Handbook of Sikh Studies. Oxford University Press. pp. 170–179. ISBN 978-0-19-969930-8.
- Syan, Hardip S. (2013). Sikh Militancy in the Seventeenth Century: Religious Violence in Mughal and Early Modern India. I.B.Tauris. ISBN 978-1-78076-250-0.
- Mandair, Arvind-pal Singh (2013). Sikhism: A Guide for the Perplexed (illustrated ed.). London, U.K.: A&C Black. pp. 40–51. ISBN 9781441102317.
