= Guru Har Sahai =

- City
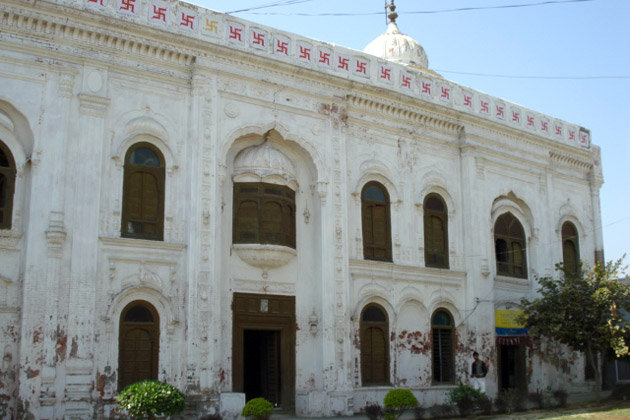
- The historical Pothimala building located in Guru Hara Sahai after ASI renovations

- Location in Punjab, India
- Coordinates: 30.717046°N 74.416383°E
- Country: India
- State: Punjab
- District: Ferozepur

Government
  - Member of the Legislative Assembly: Fauja Singh Sarari

Population (2011)
  - Total: 17,192

Languages
  - Official: Punjabi
- Time zone: UTC+5:30 (IST)
- PIN: 152022
- Telephone code: 01685-230840
- Vehicle registration: PB-77

Guru Har Sahai is a city and a municipal council in Ferozepur district in the Indian state of Punjab. Nearby cities are Ferozepur (40 km northeast), Sri Muktsar Sahib (30 km south), Fazilka (65 km southwest), Bathinda (84 km southeast).

== History ==
The city is named after Har Sahai (1725 – 1750), who was the direct descendant of the fourth Sikh guru, the Guru Ram Das, in the eighth generation. The Pothimala building was built in 1705 and the locality of Guru Har Sahai was founded in 1745 by Har Sahai's father, Guru Jiwan Mal (born 1694), who was a direct descendant of the fourth Sikh guru, Ram Das, in the seventh generation. Guru Har Sahai was also the eighth Gaddi Nashin (custodian) of the pothimala, i.e. pothi (holy book) and mala (rosary), of the first guru of the Sikhs – Guru Nanak Dev. The lineage descends from Prithi Chand, elder brother of Guru Arjan and founder of the heretical Miharvan sect of Sikhism. The Sodhi clan of Sikhs consider hereditary appointed direct descendants of fourth Sikh guru, Ram Das Sodhi, as their guru or spiritual leader, whom they refer to as Gaddi Nashin. In 2010, Archaeological Survey of India (ASI) begin the effort to restore the pothimala, the Pothimala building (including its 18th century murals), both of which are the property of the present Gaddi Nashin, 17th successor custodian Guru Yuvraj Singh.

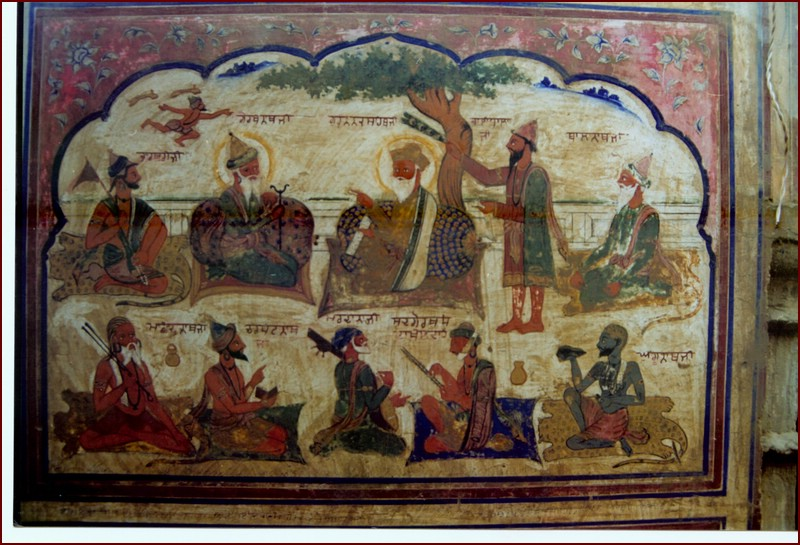
18th century fresco artwork from Pothi-Mala, Gur Harsahai, Punjab. It depicts a scene of Guru Nanak in-discussion with Yogis.

The Hargopal subsect of the Miharvan sect of Sikhism is based out of Pothimala in Guru Har Sahai. They maintain a following to this day amongst the locals and remain held in reverence, being direct descendants of the Sikh gurus and custodian of rare Sikh relics of the gurus.

== Demographics ==
As of 2001 India census, Guru Har Sahai had a population of 14,528. Males constitute 53% of the population and females 47%. Guru Har Sahai has an average literacy rate of 61%, higher than the national average of 59.5%: male literacy is 65%, and female literacy is 57%. In Guru Har Sahai, 13% of the population is under 6 years of age.

== See also ==
- List of cities in Chandigarh and Punjab, India by population
