= Trehan (surname) =

Punjabi Khatri surname

Trehan is a surname used by Punjabi Khatris.

== Notable people ==
- Kavya Trehan, Indian creative artist

=== Historical figures ===
- Guru Angad (born Lehna Trehan, 1504–1552), Punjabi saint and second Sikh Guru
- Binod Singh, 18th-century Sikh warrior and descendant of Guru Angad

=== Punjabi people ===
- Anuja Trehan Kapur (born 1975), Indian criminal psychologist
- Madhu Trehan, co-founder of Newslaundary
- Naresh Trehan (born 1945), Indian cardiovascular and cardiothoracic surgeon and director at Medanta
- Surindar Kumar Trehan (1931–2004), Indian mathematician
- Sushila Chain Trehan (1923–2011), Indian freedom fighter and women activist
