= History of Dehradun =

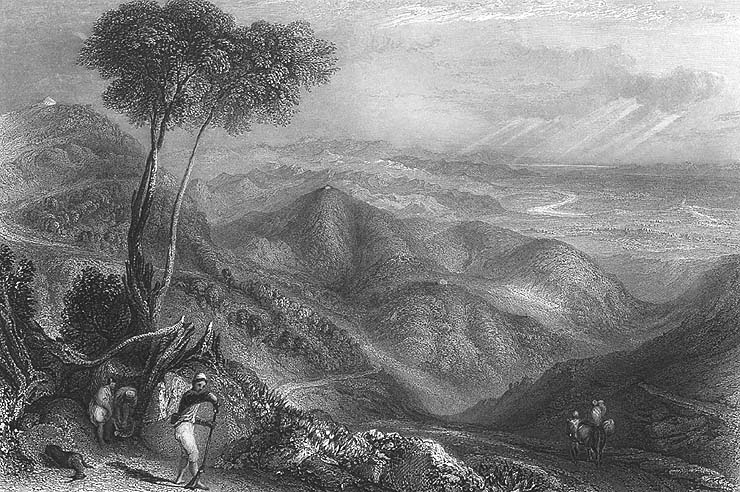
Doon Valley, Dehradun, 1850s

Dehradun is the temporary capital of The Indian state of Uttarakhand, and has a rich and eventful history, it also finds mention in scriptures as well. An early name for the settlement was Dera Ram Rai.

During the British Raj, the town was known as Dera Dun.

== History ==
=== Ancient history ===
In Skanda Purana, Dun is mentioned as a part of the region called Kedarkhand, the abode of Shiva. In ancient India during the Mahabharata epic era, Dronacharya the great teacher of Kauravas and Pandavas lived here hence the name, "Dronanagari".

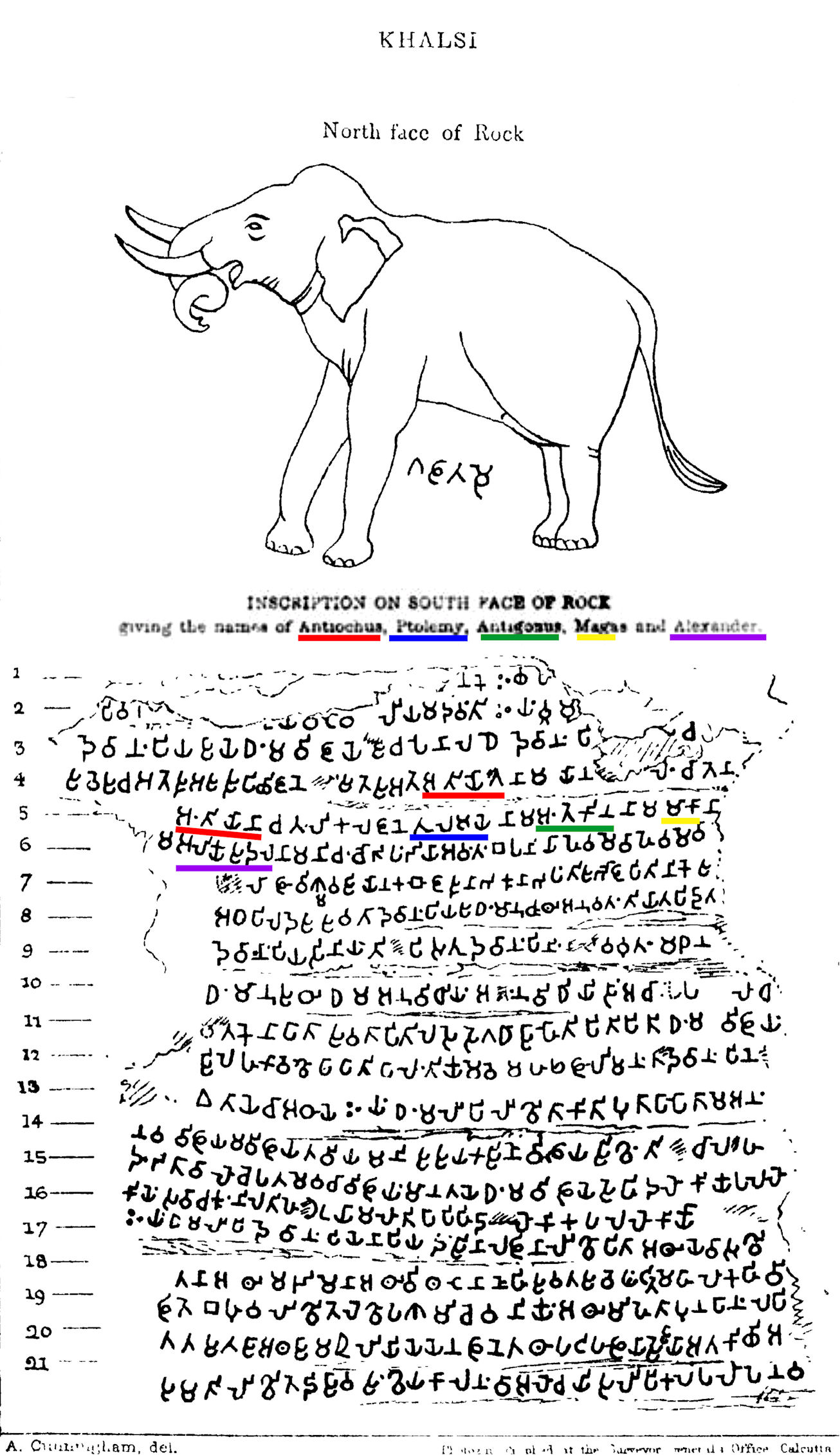
The Kalsi rock edict of Ashoka, which mentions the Greek kings Antiochus, Ptolemy, Antigonus, Magas and Alexander by name (underlined in color).

Khalsi
- Location within Uttarakhand
- Coordinates: 30.5180°N 77.8482°E

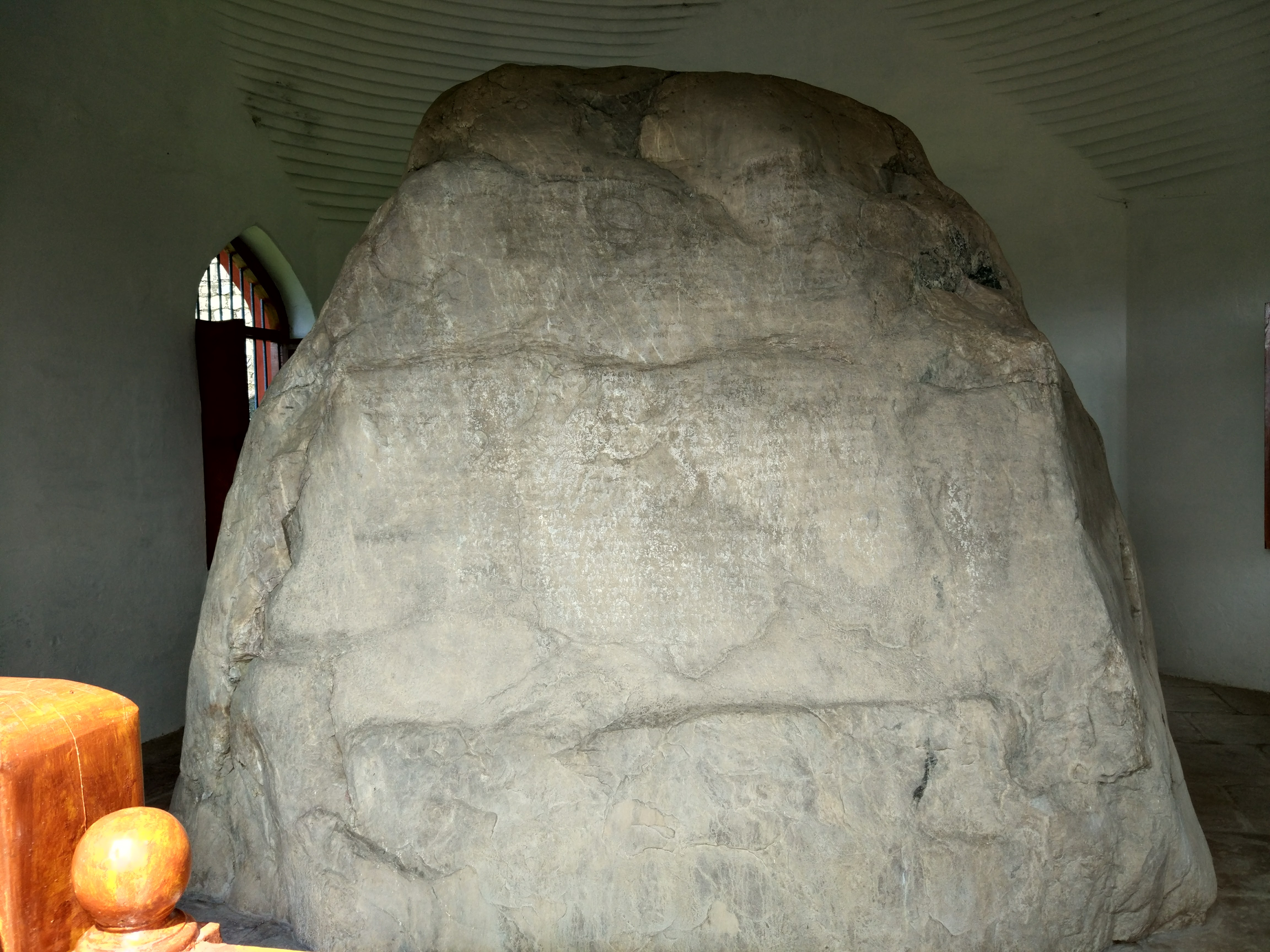
Kalsi Rock Edict

A rock edict of Ashoka, the legendary Mauryan King, who ruled between 273 BCE to 232 BCE, was discovered at Kalsi, 44 km from Dehradun by John Forest, in 1860. The edict was known as Chhatra Shila by the local residents until it was protected by the Archaeological Survey of India following its discovery. Situated on the banks of the Yamuna, Kalsi was earlier known as Kalkut and was a part of the flourishing Kulind janapada. It was the northernmost limit of the surveys done by the founder of ASI Alexander Cunningham who surveyed areas stretching from Kalsi in the north to Narmada in the south.

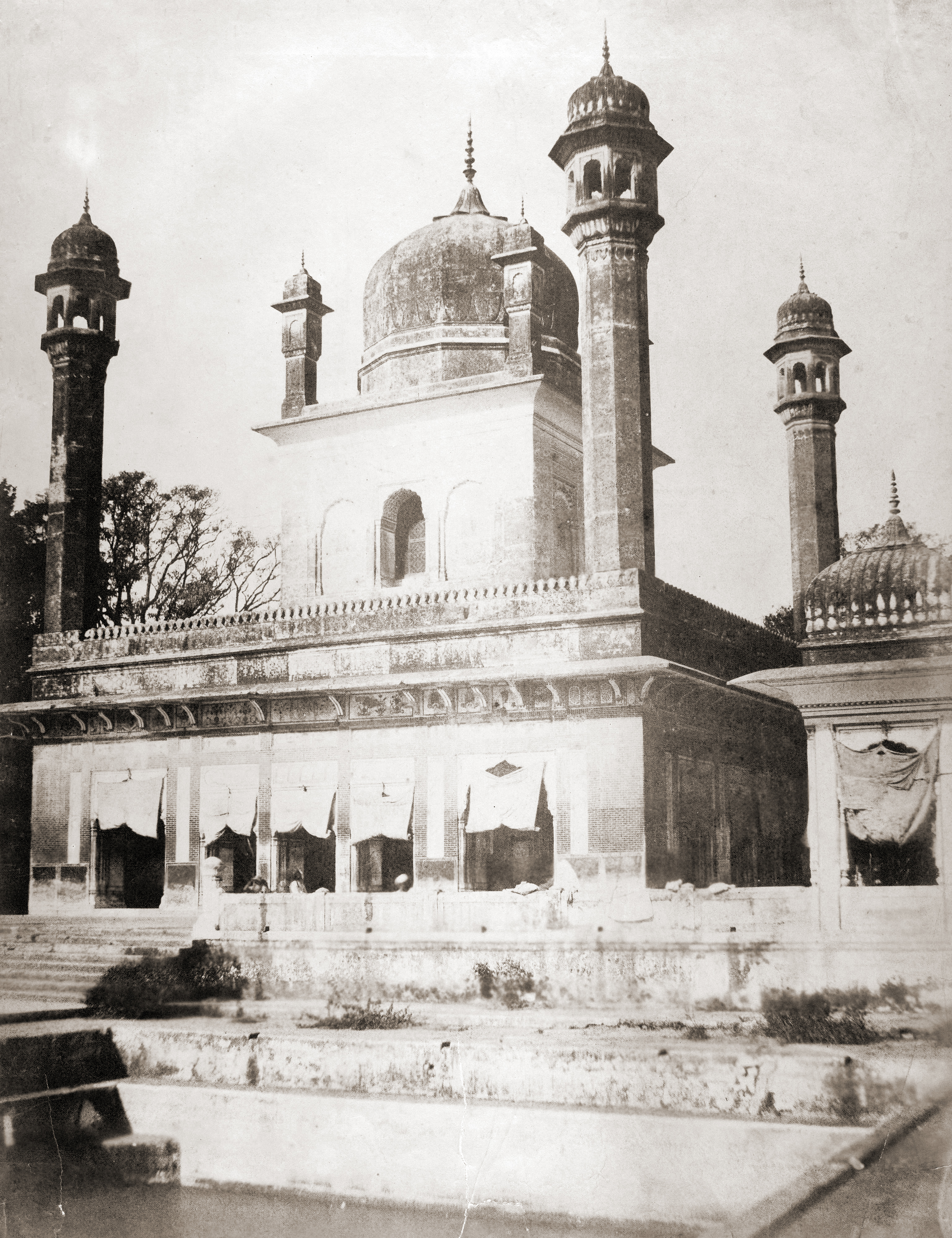
Guru Ram Rai Darbar Sahib, Dehradun, 1858

=== Establishment of the Town ===
Dehradun had been a part of the Garhwal Kingdom except for the brief interlude of the Rohillas. The old name for the whole valley is dron ghati the name was found on a coin inscription which was later evolved into doon ghati, the new name of specific city believed to have been named after the camp, or dera, established by Baba Ram Rai, elder son of the seventh Sikh Guru, Guru Har Rai, who came here in 1675. He settled in the village Dhamawala, which even today hosts the annual Jhanda Mela on the fifth day after Holi in his memory. Thus the name refers to his 'dera' or camp in the 'Doon' valley, around which the present town gradually developed, and marking this settlement is a gurudwara called Guru Ram Rai Darbar Sahib, built between 1699 and 1707 with the help of Raja of Garhwal, Fateh Shah, who was succeeded by his grandson in the same year, Pratap Shah, and modelled on the tomb of Mughal Emperor Jehangir.

Historically, Dehradun was a part of the Garhwal Kingdom also known as 'Kedarkhand', which was founded by Ajai Pal around 1400, by capturing all the minor principalities of the Garhwal region, under his own sway, and thereafter, he and his descendants ruled over Garhwal and the adjacent state of Tehri-Garhwal, in an uninterrupted line till 1803, when the Gurkhas invaded Kumaon and Garhwal. In 1757, Najib-ul-Daula, the governor of Saharanpur, who later founded city of Najibabad, invaded the city with his army of Rohillas and ruled here, leading to its widespread development. He provided them with land, fostered trade, dug canals, sank wells and raised the revenue to a lakh and a quarter of rupees though after his death in 1770, the region was restored to Pradeep Shah of garhwal but doon's prosperity invited frequent raid from surrounding tribes of Rajputs, Gujjars, Sikhs and Gurkhas who ruled the region in quick succession for 11 years, and lead to its steady downfall.

=== The Gurkha Rule and the Arrival of the British - 19th century ===
In 1804, it was annexed by the Gurkhas, who made the king of Garhwal, Pradyuman Shah, flee to Saharanpur, leaving the region to be ruled strictly by the Gurkha general 'BAL BHADRA KUNWAR'. Later, King Pradyuman Shah and his brothers Kunwar Parakrama Shah and Kunwar Pritam Shah, and a 12,000 strong army fought with the Gorkhas at Khurbura, where Pradyuman Shah was killed.

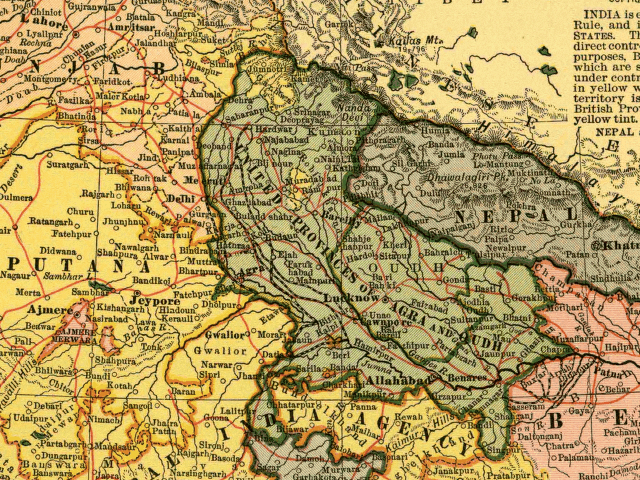
Dehradun as a part of United Provinces, 1903

In the same year, the British had already taken over Saharanpur, which led to continuous skirmishes between the two armies, leading to the Gurkha War (1814–1816), also known as the Anglo-Nepalese War, when eventually the Gurkhas were ousted after the siege of the fort of Nalapani.

The Sugauli Treaty, signed on 2 December 1815 and ratified by 4 March 1816, between the British East India Company and The Kingdom of Nepal, ending the second British invasion of the Himalayan kingdom during the Anglo-Nepalese War (1814–1816). The signatory for Nepal was Raj Guru Gajaraj Mishra aided by Chandra Sekher Upadhyaya and Lieutenant-Colonel Paris Bradshaw signed for the company.

The treaty led to the annexation of the Dehradun and east Garhwal Kingdom into the British Empire, and they became part of the Garhwal District, in the Kumaon Division of the United Provinces, and had an area of 5629 sq. mi, and that is when it slowly started regaining its lost glory. Meanwhile, the west Garhwal was reinstituted to the Garhwal Kingdom, and Sudarshan Shah, son of the slain king, was made the king of Tehri Garhwal, who made Tehri his capital.

=== The British Rule in Dehradun ===
The British began establishing institutions 1816 onwards. The 'Dehra Dun' municipality was established in 1867, and in 1900 railways made its way to Dehradun via Haridwar, which was earlier connected in 1886.

In 1901, Dehradun had a population of 24,039, and was a district of British India, in the Meerut division of the United Provinces, while the neighbouring town of Rajpur, which lay en route to the hill-station of Mussourie, and from where pure drinking water was supplied to the city through pipes, had a population of 2,900. Dehra Dun also emerged as the centre of tea cultivation experiments by the British who thought of developing tea here even before Assam. Dehra Dun tea was once famous worldwide.

During the Second World War the Dehra Dun Central Internment Camp was a major prison camp for detained Germans, Austrians and Italians who were living in or visiting British colonies in Asia at the start of the war. Its most famous inmate was perhaps Heinrich Harrer, who after several attempts finally escaped in 1944 with Peter Aufschnaiter and slipped over the mountains into neutral Tibet. He recounted his time at the camp in Seven years in Tibet (Rupert Hart-Davis, 1953) and Beyond seven years in Tibet: my life before, during and after. (Labyrinth Press, 2007). Several German Buddhist monks, including Nyanatiloka, also stayed here. The camp was divided into different sections, one for Germans loyal to the Nazi government, one for German communists and others who rejected the Nazi government, one for Italians, and one section for Italian Catholic clergy.

=== Dehradun Post-Independence ===
Dehradun has expanded as a city post-1947 and got its most iconic and central monument, the Clock Tower, soon after. The construction work of the six-faced Clock Tower, also called Ghanta Ghar, began in the year 1948 and its foundation stone was laid by Sarojini Naidu. It was built in the memory of local resident Lala Balbir Singh Bahadur and is hence also named the Balbir Clock Tower. Its construction was completed in the year 1953 and it was inaugurated by the then Railways Minister Lal Bahadur Shastri. A commemorative plaque inside the premises of the tower details this history. The city became the hub of education and was made the capital of Uttarakhand state in the year 2000. It became a part of the Smart Cities Mission with nine smart city projects as a part of its development.

== See also ==
- Kalsi
- Vikasnagar
