= Ramraiya =

Sikh sect founded by Ram Rai

Ramraiya ਰਾਮਰਾਈਆ
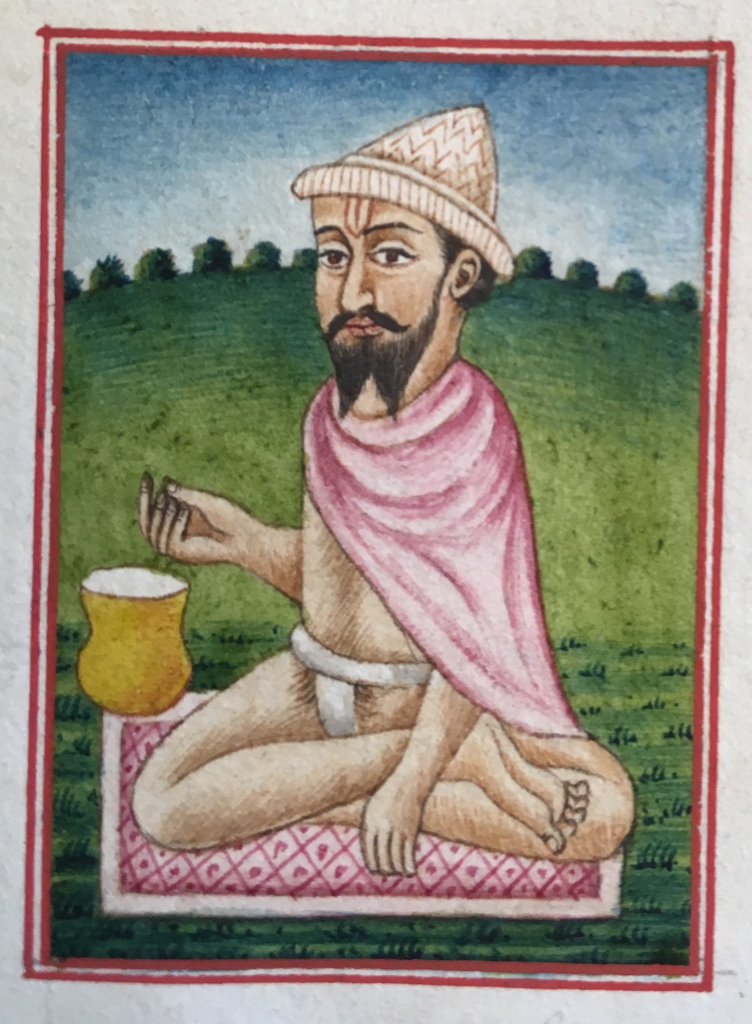
- Painting of a Ramraiya ascetic of Varanasi from a folio of a manuscript of the Silsilah-i-Jogiyan, ca.1800

Founder
- Ram Rai

Regions with significant populations
- Punjab • Uttarakhand (Dehradun)

Religions
- Sikhism

Languages
- Punjabi

The Ramraiyas (Gurmukhi: ਰਾਮਰਾਈਆ; rāmarā'ī'ā), also referred to as Ram Raiyas, are a Sikh sect that follows Ram Rai, the excommunicated eldest son of Guru Har Rai (1630–61). The sect was syncretic, combining Sikh, Mughal, and Pahari traditions. It was part of the larger Udasi sect, being classified as an udaseen parampara. The followers of Ram Rai are found across North India. Its principal centre is the Guru Ram Rai Darbar complex in Dehradun, Uttarakhand, India.

== History ==
=== Ram Rai ===
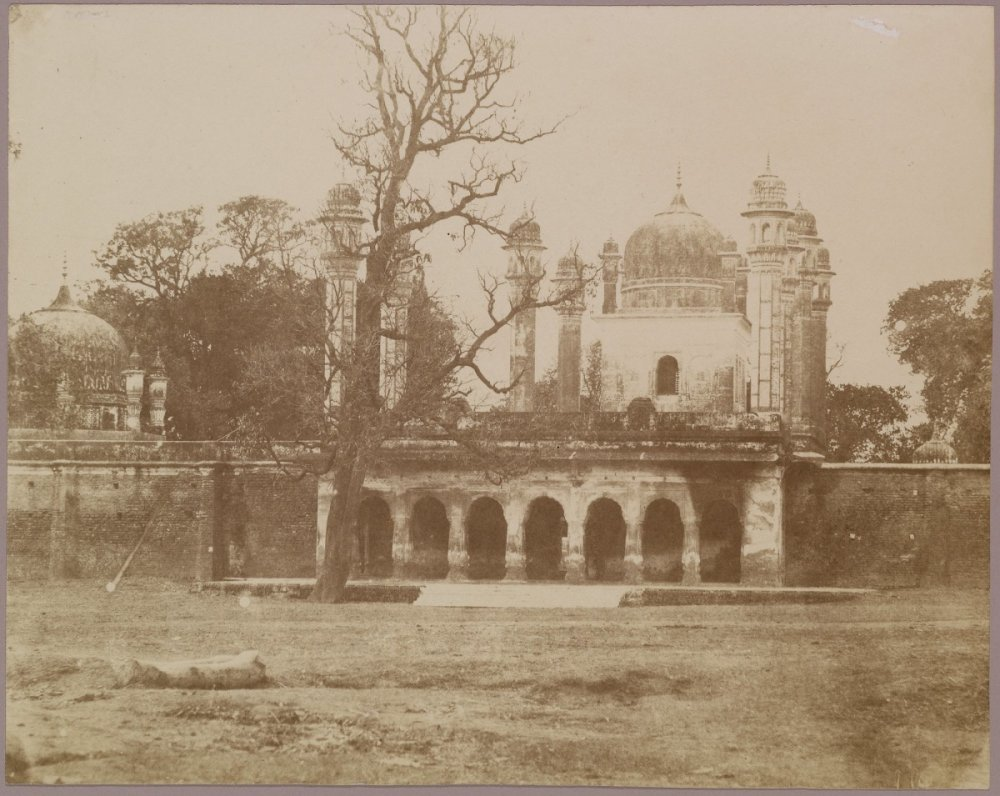
Ramraiya sect gurdwara at Dehradun, India, c. 1857-1858, printed 1859

Ram Rai was sent by his father as an emissary to the Mughal emperor Aurangzeb in Delhi. Aurangzeb objected to a verse in the Sikh scripture (Asa ki Var) that stated, "the clay from a Musalman's grave is kneaded into potter's lump", considering it an insult to Islam. Baba Ram Rai explained that the text was miscopied and modified it, substituting "Musalman" with "Beiman" (faithless, evil) which Aurangzeb approved. The willingness to change a word led Guru Har Rai to bar his son from his presence, and name his younger son as his successor. Aurangzeb responded by granting Ram Rai a jagir (fief) in the Garhwal region (Uttarakhand). The area of modern Dehradun was under the rule of King Fateh Shah of Garhwal Kingdom, who had been commanded by Aurangzeb to facilitate Ram Rai and establish himself in the wilds of the valley, where he established his Durbar in 1676, with the work on the building finally being completed by his widow, Panjab Kaur, in 1699. The town later came to be known as Dehradun, after Dehra, referring to Baba Ram Rai's shrine. The sect was established with the help of Delhi-based masands.

Ram Rai was connected to the earlier Udasi sect, being described as an "udaseen fakir". As per one narration, Ram Rai became an udaseen ("dissatisfied one") after being ex-communicated by his father, Guru Har Rai. Ram Rai is believed to have performed seventy-two miracles while he was in Delhi, including conjuring a three-legged goat. As per the Mahima Prakash (1776), Aurangzeb was impressed by Ram Rai's mystic powers and bestowed him with the title of qamil fakir and granted him the village Khera-Chandrawal near Majnu-ka-Tila in Delhi. Ram Rai died in 1689 and the darbar was managed by his widow Panjab Kaur after his death.

=== Udasi association ===
Ram Rai started becoming associated with the Udasi sect during this time at Dehradun, as the area was a stronghold of the guru-chela and Udasi sect. Aside from the Udasis, another influential sects that yogis and sadhus drew from were the Gorakhpanthis, with many religious sites being located along the course of the Rispana river associated with them. The main dera site became managed by his widow, Mata Punjab Kaur, and two mahants, namely Oudh Das and Har Prasad. As Ram Rai had no children, instead a mahant would succeed him spiritually. The sect became co-opted by Udasis of the Bhai Balu Hasna tradition after the death of Punjab Kaur in 1741. Udho Das, also associated with Hasna's centre, served Mata Panjab Kaur, the widow of Ram Rai at Dehradun after her death in April 1741, and succeeded her, constructing a samadhi honouring Bhai Balu Hasna at Dehradun.

=== Mahants ===
Many followers of Ram Rai settled with Ram Rai, they followed Guru Nanak, but Sikhs have shunned them. They were one of the Panj Mel, the five reprobate groups that Sikhs are expected to shun with contempt. The other four are the Minas, the Masands, the Dhirmalias, the Sir-gums (those Sikhs who accept Amrit baptism but subsequently cut their hair).

After the death of Ram Rai, successive mahants of the Dehradun Darbar became the leaders of the sect, who were worshiped by its followers. The mahants and their darbar were patrons of Hindustani classical music in the Gwalior gharana. The Ramlila tradition was held, with its particular style being known as the Jhanda Bazaar Shivaji Samiti Ramlila of Dehra Dun. After the third mahant, all of the mahants were Garhwal locals. The later mahants (head-priests of the sect) would have the Darbar complex constructed and its walls were decorated with murals. The constructions around the main mausoleum of Ram Rai and his wives were put-up by the mahants, which included samadhis (cenotaphs) of the mahant leaders of the sect. These were built as per Sikh architecture. The Jhanda Darwaza was finished in the 1880's, with its murals being mostly painted by Tulsi Ram (1881–1950, also known as Phattu Sah) likely between ca.1885–1896 during the tenure of Mahant Prayag Das. Tulsi Ram's brother, Kitchlu Sah, and their father, probably painted some of the murals as well.

After the Gurdwara Reform movement in the 1920s, the sect adopted a Hindu identity to prevent its property from being taken over by the Sikh reformers, although it still retains Sikh practices. During the tenure of Mahant Indresh Charan Das, the sect founded medical and educational institutions (known as a Sri Guru Ram Rai Public School) across northern India which provided an English-medium education.

== Festivals ==
The Jhanda-Ka-Mela (Jhanda Fair) is held five-days after Holi, where the nishan (symbol) is changed and a new one is installed at the gateway. As per Ajay Sharma, the jhande ji (which originated from Rai Rai as a mark of an encampment) is changed once every three years on the occasion of the fifth day after Holi (corresponding to the birthday of Ram Rai) during the Jhande ka Mela fair. The fair used to be held in the lane adjacent to the Ram Rai Darbar but now it is held at Matawale Bagh. To select the new jhande ji, the tallest Sal tree from the Doodhli jungle is cut-down, cleaned, and brought to site around 30 kilometres away by being carried on the shoulders of the sangat (congregation), where it is bathed and meditated upon. A cloth known as gilaf is wrapped around it, with the top-most velvet cloth being known as the Darshani Gilaf. Each time the jhande ji is changed, a specific family has the duty of preparing the Darshani Gilaf. Halwa prashad is distributed during the occasion.

== Leaders ==
The mahants of the sect remain celibate and appoint a successor prior to their death.

No.	Name (Birth–Death)	Portrait	Leadership term	Reference(s)
1.	Ram Rai(1645 – 1687)		? – 1687	
Mahants
2.	Aud Das (Note: According to the tradition of the Guru Ram Rai Darbar Sahib, Aud Das was the successor to Ram Rai. However, Henry George Walton in the British Garhwal: A Gazetteer, regards Har Prasad as his immediate successor, ignoring Aud Das.)		1687 – 1741	
3.	Har Prasad		1741 – 1766	
4.	Har Sewak		1766 – 1818	
5.	Har Swaroop Das		1818 – 1842	
6.	Preetam Das		1842 – 1854	
7.	Narayan Das		1854 – 1885	
8.	Prayag Das		1885 – 1896	
9.	Laxman Das		1896 – 1945	
10.	Indiresh Charan Das (14 November 1919 – 10 June 2000)		1945 – 2000	
11.	Davendra Das		2000 – present	

== See also ==
- Namdharis
- Nirankaris
- Nirmala
- Sewapanthis
- Radha Soamis
- Ramgharia
- Guru Ram Rai Darbar Sahib
