= Kumaon campaigns against Garhwal and Doti (1698–1704) =

Himalayan military campaign

Date	1698–1707
Location	Garhwal, Kumaon, Doti and adjoining regions
Result	Kumaoni victory

Belligerents
Kumaon Kingdom	Garhwal Kingdom; Doti Kingdom

Commanders and leaders
Gyan Chand	Fateh Shah

During the reign of Gyan Chand in the late 17th and early 18th centuries, the Kumaon Kingdom executed a sequence of military expeditions against Garhwal and Doti. The campaigns consisted of retaliatory expeditions by the Garhwali forces into Kumaon, as well as repeated incursions into Garhwal and Doti. In the Pindar valley, along the Ramganga, in Malla Salan and Chaukot, and in the Bhabar region, significant operations are documented.

== Background ==
Gyan Chand started his rule by setting off a military expedition toward Garhwal. He devastated Tharali villages after crossing into the valley of the Pindar River. The Kumaoni army crossed the Ramganga and pillered the pargana of Malla Salan's villages of Sabli, Khatali, and Saindhar.

The Garhwalis launched counterattacks following these incursions. The Garhwali king Fateh Shah broke into the Chaukot and Girwar districts of the Pali pargana of Kumaon. The repeated trips turned into a cycle of frontier raids.

== Campaigns in Garhwal ==
=== Pindar valley campaign ===
Gyan Chand plundered several Garhwal towns and invaded the Pindar valley in 1698. Among the first big expeditions credited to him against Garhwal was the campaign.

Kumaoni forces once more crossed the Ramganga and pillered Sabli Khatli and Saidhār in the Malla Salan pargana the next year, in 1699. Fateh Shah responded by invading the Chaukot and Girwar sections of Kumaon's Pali pargana in 1701.

The ongoing raids seriously disrupted the frontier regions. Some people left their agricultural villages, and later forest covered some border area.

=== Campaign of 1701 ===
Garhwal's king set out an expedition into the Pali pargana's Givad and Chaukot areas in 1701. The campaign was said to be wreaking great destruction.

Kumaon's Garhwali expedition set off more military action. Mostly, the two kingdoms' ongoing conflict consisted in retaliatory raids whereby agricultural areas along the frontier were repeatedly attacked.

=== Battle of Duduli ===
The Kumaoni troops routed the Garhwalis in a fight at Duduli, above Mahalchauri in 1703. The Garhwali royal army withdrew toward Srinagar after their loss.

The Kumaoni army then progressed and pillered the nearby area. One of the main acknowledged triumphs of the Kumaoni army during Gyan Chand's operations was their victory at Duduli.

== Campaign against Doti ==
Gyan Chand dispatched his troops into the Bhabar and surrounding low-country areas under Doti in 1704. The Kumaoni army caused great damage and laid waste over the nation.

According to reports, the campaign had severe consequences that stayed evident among groups of people who survived the expedition. The campaign proved that Gyan Chand's military operations reached areas connected to Doti outside the Kumaon-Garhwal border.

== Later campaign of 1707 ==
Another significant expedition headed for Garhwal in 1707. Juniyagarh in Patti Bichhla Chaukot came under the control of the Kumaoni forces.

The army then passed and penetrated as far as Chandppur near Khal on the Bhararigarh across the Panuwakhal. The Kumaoni troops destroyed an old fort on the journey.

This was among the last significant campaigns under Gyan Chand directed against Garhwal.

== Nature of the campaigns ==
Rather than protracted territorial warfare, the campaigns were typified mostly by raids, plundering, and the destruction of villages. Kumaoni and Garhwali armies set out explorations into the domain of the other kingdom.

== See also ==
- Kumaon Kingdom
- Garhwal Kingdom
- Chand dynasty
- Doti Kingdom
- History of Uttarakhand
