= Kirati Chand =

Ruler of the Chand dynasty of Kumaon

- Raja of Kumaon
- Reign: 1488 – 1503 AD
- Predecessor: Ratan Chand
- Successor: Pratap Chand
- House: Chand
- Dynasty: Chand dynasty
- Father: Ratan Chand
- Religion: Hinduism

Kirati Chand (also spelled Kirti Chand; reigned 1488–1503 AD) was a ruler of the Chand dynasty who ruled the Kumaon Kingdom. He is regarded as one of the most active and expansionist rulers of the early Chand dynasty, consolidating Chand authority over much of present-day Kumaon through military campaigns against neighboring principalities.

== Early reign ==
Kirati Chand succeeded Ratan Chand in 1488 AD. Atkinson's contemporary traditions describe him as having a military reputation similar to his father's. Shortly after his accession, he worked hard to drill and organize his army, maintain frontier garrisons, and plan campaigns against neighboring rulers.

After renouncing its allegiance, the Doti kingdom invaded Kumaon once more during his reign. While Kirati Chand was preparing to lead the campaign himself, local legend has it that he received advice from the ascetic Nagnath, who advised him to stay in Champawat and entrust the military expedition to his generals. The Chand forces then decisively defeated the Doti army, and Doti is said to have refrained from launching further invasions into Kali Kumaon for an extended period.

== Later campaigns ==
After gaining control of Baramandal, Kirati Chand expanded Chand's influence throughout Kumaon.

He conquered the territories of Phaldakot, Kota, and Kotau before returning to Champawat via Dhyanirau, where he appointed administrative officers to organize the newly acquired districts.

His next expedition moved into the Mal region, where he established a military post near Jaspur and named it Kiratipur after himself.

Kirati Chand ruled over almost all of historical Kumaon by the end of his reign. Only the Katyuri territories of Askot, Sira, Sor, Danpur, the Bhot Mahals, and parts of Gangoli were not directly under Chand control. According to Atkinson, the yogi Satyanath's influence prevented further expansion into Garhwal.

== Administration ==
Kirati Chand named administrative officials in recently acquired areas to unite Chand power after his conquests. Redistributing captured territory among devoted supporters helped the kingdom to be more integrated and enhanced Chand's rule over the area.

== Legacy ==
Kirati Chand is regarded as one of the principal architects of the expansion of the Chand kingdom. His reign marked the transition of the Chand dynasty from a regional principality centred on Champawat into the dominant political power of Kumaon.

== See also ==
- History of Uttarakhand
