= Guru Ram Rai Darbar Sahib =

Place of worship in Dehradun, India

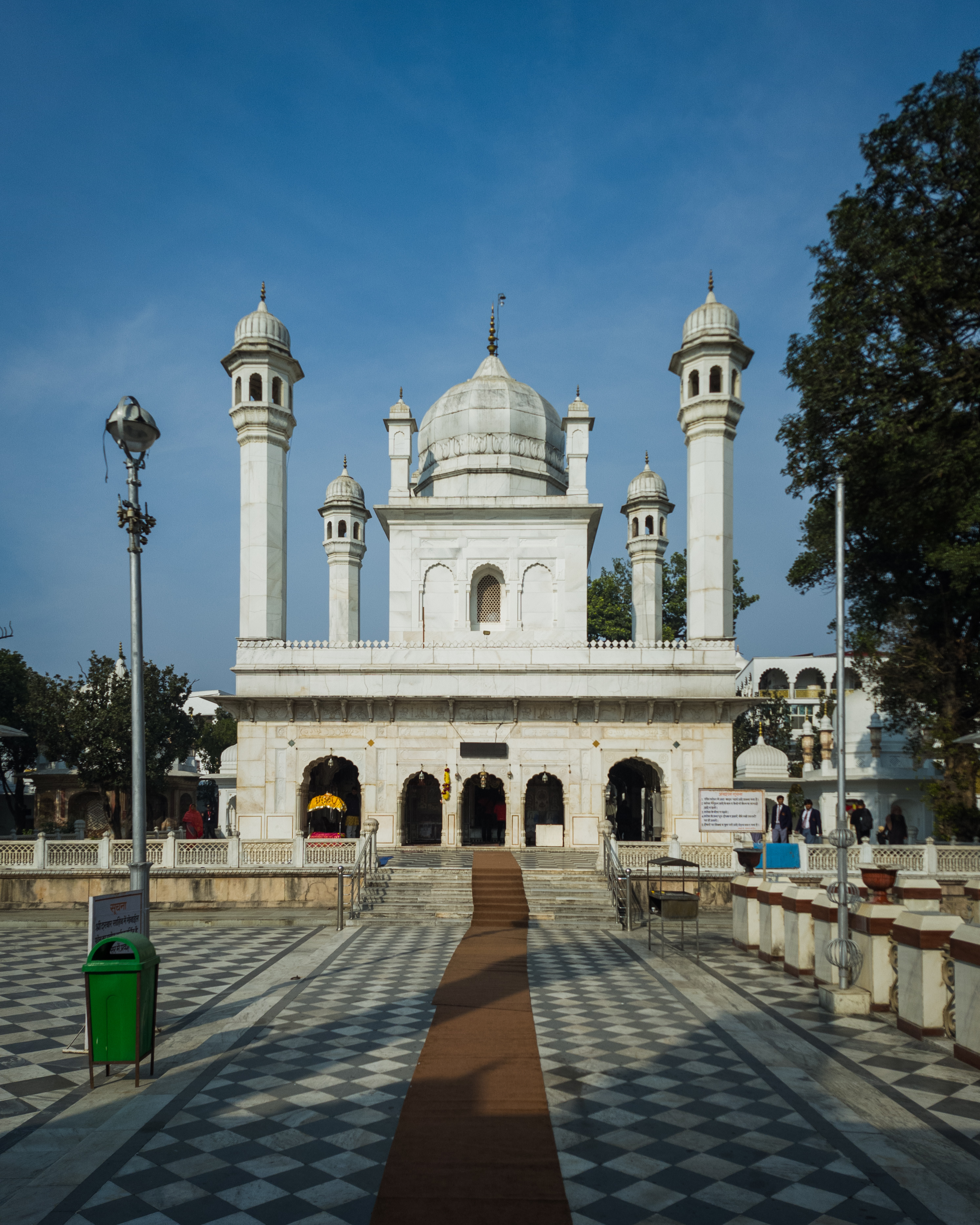
- Main building of Guru Ram Rai Darbar Sahib

- Location within Uttarakhand Location within India

Religion
- Affiliation: Sikhism
- Sect: Ramraiya

Location
- Location: Jhanda Mohalla, Dehradun, India
- Coordinates: 30.3181°N 78.0318°E

Architecture
- Style: Sikh architecture with influences and motifs from Islamic architecture
- Completed: 1699: Central complex completed 1703–06: Completion of building work

Website
- http://www.sgrrdarbar.org/

Guru Ram Rai Darbar Sahib, also known as the Jhanda Sahib and nicknamed Jhandeji, is a Sikh place of worship in Dehradun, India, dedicated to Baba Ram Rai, eldest son of Guru Har Rai, the seventh of the ten Sikh Gurus. Baba Ram Rai settled here with his followers in the mid-17th century, after he was banished by the Sikh orthodoxy for mistranslating scripture in front of the Mughal emperor Aurangzeb, so as to not cause offence. It is believed the city, Dehradun, gets its name from the religious camp established by him: a "dera", or camp, in the "doon" valley.

The building is historically and architecturally significant, as it derives many of its architectural motifs, like minarets, domes and gardens, from Islamic architecture. While Sikh architecture, in general, drew inspiration from Mughal styles, the Darbar Sahib was unique in that it relied more heavily on elements that give it the appearance of a mosque than a conventional gurudwara. This was unusual in the 17th-18th centuries, as at the time Sikhs were generally in conflict with the Muslim rulers of India. The Islamic influence was the result of a cordial relationship between Baba Ram Rai and the Mughal emperor Aurangzeb, who provided lands and funds for the site.

== History ==
Photograph of the Guru Ram Rai Darbar Sahib, Dehradun, c. 1870's

The temple site was founded by Baba Ram Rai in the mid-17th century after he was banished by the orthodox Sikh sect for mistranslating a word in the Adi Granth in front of the Mughal emperor Aurangzeb. He replaced the word "Mussalman" with "faithless" (beimān) to prevent causing offence. After being banished by his father Guru Har Rai, Ram Rai settled in the area after Mughal emperor ordered in 1675 Raja Fateh Shah of Garhwal to bestow land to Ram Rai for a settlement. The Ramraiyan sect came into being through this. The settlement is believed to have given Dehradun its name: a "dera", or camp, in the "Doon" valley. Locals began calling the place “Dera of Guru Ram Rai in the Doon” → which gradually shortened to “Dehradun". The central complex of the temple was completed in 1699, twelve years after Baba Ram Rai's death, and the complete structural work was finished between 1703 and 1706; embellishment and painting work is thought to have continued long after the structural completion. The Mughal state provided funds for its construction, with a Persian-inscribed stone at the site stating the following:

The learned Monarch honoured the place of the Guru’s death like heaven, and erected a monument to his beloved memory.

— Inscribed stone-slab in Persian at the site

After the death of Ram Rai, the site became managed by his widow, Mata Punjab Kaur, and two mahants, namely Oudh Das and Har Prasad. As Ram Rai had no children, instead a mahant would succeed him spiritually. Mata Panjab Kaur, Baba Ram Rai's wife, oversaw the construction work and managed the affairs of the Darbar till her death in 1741/42. Mata Punjab Kaur oversaw the construction of the boundary walls, Jhanda Gate, Langarkhana, and the samadhi shrine of her late husband. The site became managed by Udasis of the Bhai Balu Hasna lineage after her death. During the tenure of Mahant Har Sewak Das, the samadhis of the four wives were constructed.

Until the Gurdwara Reform movement in the 1920s, the site operated much like a Sikh gurdwara or Udasi dera. A Guru Granth Sahib had been installed at the site. After the Sikh reform movement, the site was converted to a Hindu temple to prevent its property from being taken over by the Sikh reformers, although it still retains Sikh practices (such as langar and gurmantra).

== Architecture ==
The complex bears the influence of both Mughal and Rajasthani architecture. The site consists of five main structures and gardens. It can be divided into three main parts:

- Jhanda Gate and the Naubatkhana, both edifices are decorated with murals. The top of the Jhanda Gate also features an art-gallery room.
- Darbar Bhawan, Langarkhana, and Hall of Audience (which contains life-sized oil-paintings of all the former mahants)
- Dera complex proper, including the shrine of Ram Rai and his four wives, the sadhana platform, a water-tank, and the Darshani and Bhai Bahlo gates, it also features the Barikrama art-gallery.

Unusually for a Sikh place of worship, Indo-Islamic architecture defines the main Darbar structure, which is surrounded by a miniature Mughal-style garden. The central mausoleum was inspired by the Tomb of Jahangir. An influence of Mughal architecture are the minarets (minar) located at the site. The central mausoleum has four, smaller mausoleums (cenotaphs) dedicated to the four wives of Ram Rai at its corners. None of the mausoleums or cenotaphs contain human remains but rather they memorialize the historical figure, known as a samadhi. There is also a cremation ground and garden at the complex. The site was originally constructed out of mud, stone, lime, and red-brick until the tenure of Mahant Lakhsman Das, who renovated the site by adding marble to some of the edifices, particular the main memorial dedicated to Ram Rai. The entire complex is enclosed by a 12–14 foot boundary wall, which contains four gateways opening to all four directions.

=== List of buildings at the site ===
Buildings of the Guru Ram Rai Darbar
Site	Image	Note
Shrine of Ram Rai		Completed in 1706
Residence of the mahant		Two-storied, likely built in the early-to-mid 19th century
Jhanda Darwaza		Main gate near the bazaar
Bhai Balaun/Bahlo Darwaza		Southern gate, dedicated to a masand and associate of Ram Rai
Memorial of Maluki Devi		Four cenotaphs (samadhi) of his wives (known as the Matas' Samadhis), completed between 1780–1817
Memorial of Raj Kaur		Four cenotaphs (samadhi) of his wives (known as the Matas' Samadhis), completed between 1780–1817
Memorial of Lal Kaur		Four cenotaphs (samadhi) of his wives (known as the Matas' Samadhis), completed between 1780–1817
Memorial of Mata Punjab Kaur		Four cenotaphs (samadhi) of his wives (known as the Matas' Samadhis), completed between 1780–1817
Memorial of Bhai Sangat Das		A samadhi shrine dedicated to Bhai Sangat Das, a companion of Ram Rai.

== Artwork ==
=== Miniature paintings ===
The mahant of the complex has a collection of at-least 22 miniature paintings in the Mughal-style, which depict both Hindu and Sikh themes. It consists of 16 portraits, the portray the Sikh gurus (except for Guru Tegh Bahadur and Guru Gobind Singh), Kabir with his son Kamal, and Rama and Sita. Some of them depict Janamsakhi scenes. They are all dated to c. 1685, except for one of Guru Nanak which is dated to c. 1689. They were all likely commissioned by Ram Rai himself.

=== Wall paintings ===
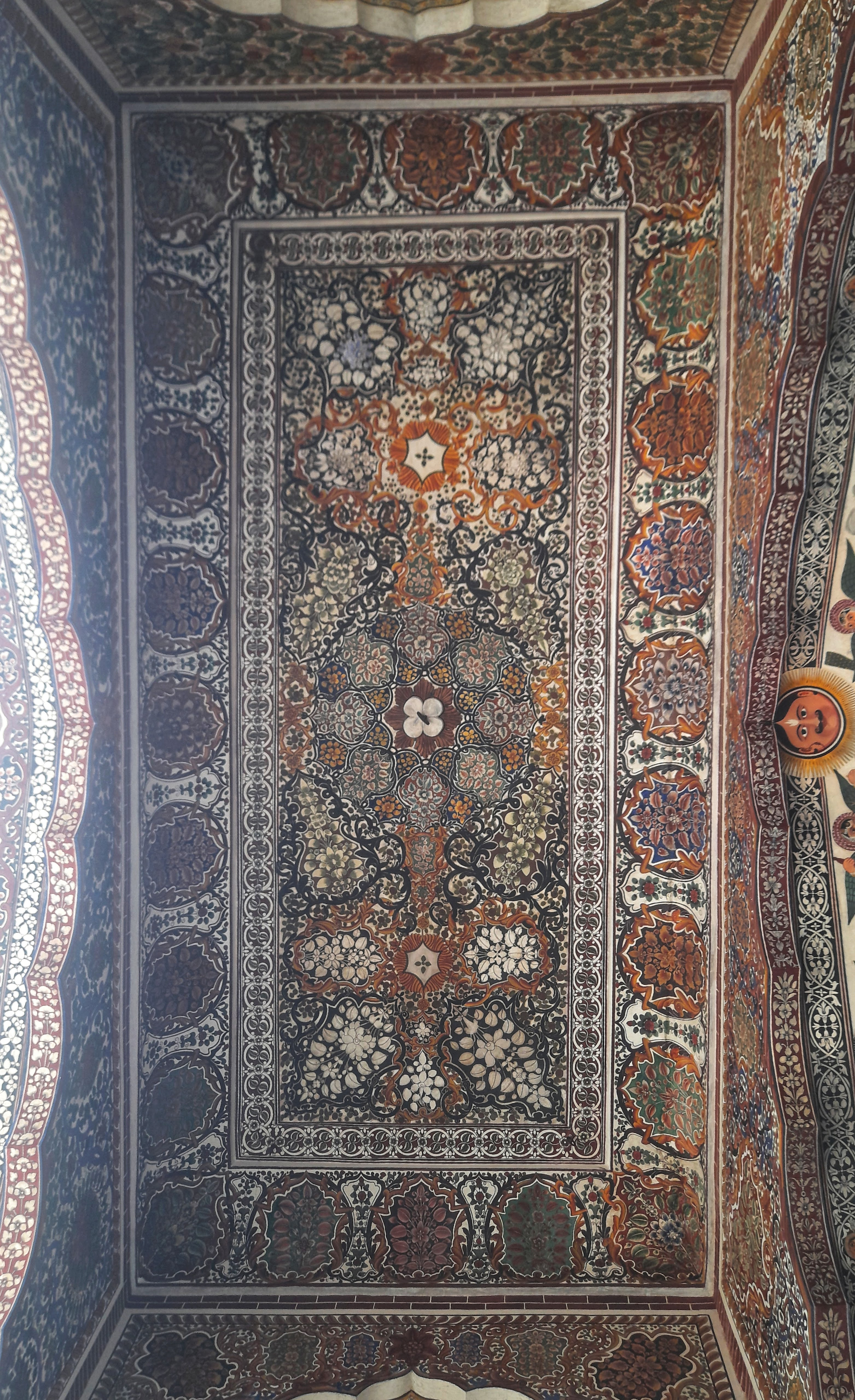
Painted murals on the ceiling, Guru Ram Rai Darbar Sahib, Dehradun

There are around 500 wall-paintings at the site currently (mostly located on the Jhanda Darwaza pavilion), painted between the early 1700s to c. 1910s. Some wall-paintings have been lost in the past due to renovations. They depict themes and subjects such as the Sikh gurus, Puranic lore, local leaders, and commoners. The oldest murals are influenced more by the Mughal school, the middle-period murals are characteristic of a local Garhwali school, while the later murals are influenced by European styles (specifically the Company school). Some of the uncovered names of artists who worked at the site include Kallu Mistri, Chandra Bhan, Tulsi Ram Mistri, and Dal Chand. The buildings in the complex were once lavishly decorated with Mughal-style wall paintings, which were specimens of rare wall paintings found in Uttarakhand. The paintings have either been lost to successive re-paintings or re-marblings or are in poor shape and in need of preservation. Some paintings date back to the 17th century and are over 300 years old. The wall paintings are documented in the work Early Wall Paintings of Garhwal (2003) by B. P. Kamboj, who claims that there are over 500 wall-paintings at the site. Some of the mural scenes are replicted multiple times, such as there being three different murals that depict Ram Rai with a miraculous, three-legged goat. Almost all of the murals were created by anonymous artists of different schools and styles in the Jaipuri wet-fresco technique, only one name of the artist Tulsi is mentioned in the form of a self-portrait. The artists came from the surrounding hill region and worked at the site for payment and sustenance. The paintings cover a wide variety of subjects and themes:

- Religious: depicting Sikh gurus, Ram Rai, mahants, Inder Sabha, and Hindu deities and mythology (such as the Mahabharata, Bhagavad Gita, Ramayana, and Krishna Lila). The paintings also depict certain events related to the dera site, such as specific ceremonies.
- Romantic: depicting folk-tales, such as Laila-Majnun and Heer-Ranjha
- Secular: depicting Mughal rulers and their relatives, Indian rajas, Britishers, and officers and workers of the darbar complex
- Natural: animals and plants

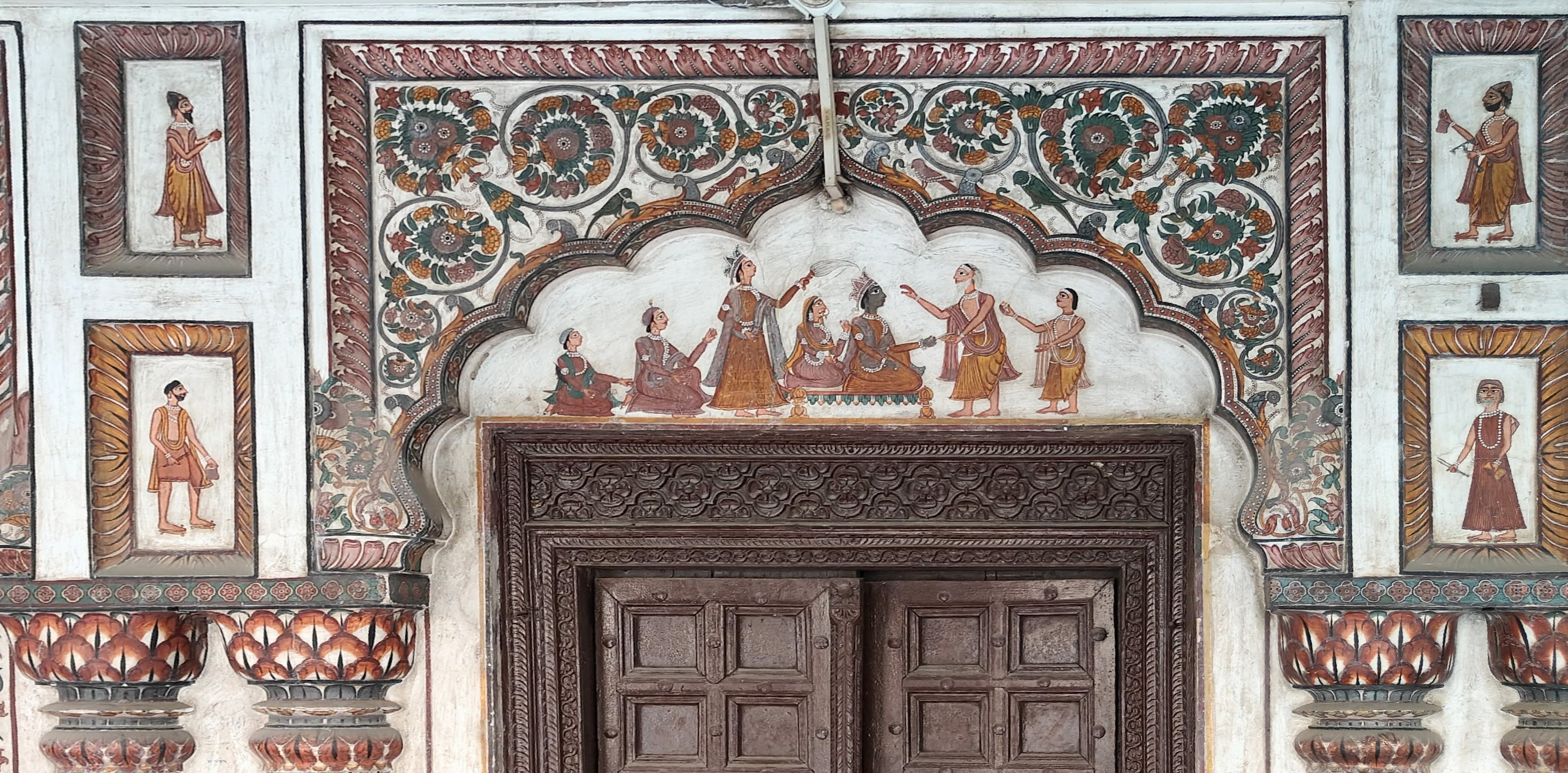
Murals on a pavilion at Guru Ram Rai Darbar Sahib, Dehradun.

The shrine proper of Ram Rai was completed a year prior to Aurangzeb's death and its paintings feature marigold, hibiscus, oleander, lotus, and water lily flower designs. There are no figurative paintings at the shrine proper due to the emperor being an orthodox Muslim and disapproving of figurative art depicting animals or humans (although bird and fishes were added, likely in a later period). The murals bear the influence of the Jaipur school of wall-painting and later Mughal style and their creation was supervised by Mata Punjab Kaur. The oldest figurative murals are those found within the Bhai Bahlo Darwaza, which depict the Sikh gurus and their relatives, which date to between 1707–1710. Alternatively, they are dated to the period of Mahant Har Sewak Das (1780–1819). The murals depicting the Sikh gurus in-particular reveal a finer level of expertise and craftsmanship when compared to the other mural of the site, which can be crude and rudimentary. The gurus are depicted in the dress of Mughal royalty. The murals are ultimately based upon miniature paintings of the Sikh figures kept in the mahant's collection dating to 1685. These are the oldest known, extant murals of the Sikh gurus in India. For the wives' samadhis, only the edifices dedicated to Lal Kaur and Punjab Kaur are decorated, featuring floral and faunal decorations, likely painted by Garhwali artists. As per H. N. Mishra, the other two samadhis of Maluki and Raj Kaur may have been left undecorated and barren of murals due to the impact of the Gorkha invasion and British colonization, as there are few paintings at the site attributed to the period of the early-to-mid 19th century.

Painting production at the site was revived under Mahant Narayan Das in the late 19th century, such as at a hall over the Jhanda Gate and on the gate's facade. After the death of Mahant Narayan Das and the coming of the 20th century, paintings ceased to be produced at the site due to stylistic and methodical shifts in taste.

The mahant's residence's lower-floor features wall-paintings depicting Hindu and Sikh themes, such as 19 paintings of scenes from the Janamsakhis in the case of the latter and Puranic deities in the case of the former. Meanwhile, the upper-floor features around 80 paintings, depicting Sikh gurus, Ram Rai, local mahants, and mythological figures and scenes. The Jhanda Darwaza (main gate, which features late 19th century works) features 383 paintings, depicting site associates and mahants, British officials and women, religious saints, soldiers or guards, Ramraiyan followers, local people, and also a self-portrait by one of the muralists.

The murals are at-risk due to sunlight, moisture, water-damage, contact from the public, theft of precious stones, people cooking in the verandah, and renovations. The reasons for their decary are poor caretaking, lack of restoration, vandalism, and being replaced by marble-slabs. In the 2000s, Mahant Devendra Das began a conservation effort regarding the murals. Between 2004 and 2014, Archaeological Survey of India carried out restoration work on the historic murals. However, the site managers decided to later opt for private contractors, with them not wishing to put up barriers to prevent the public from damaging murals, which had been recommended by the ASI. They also noticed that the water-colours the ASI used washed away with the rain and decided to opt for chemical paint. Furthermore, there were concerns with the plaster and concrete used by the ASI. Therefore, around 70% of the restoration work was done by the ASI with the remaining 30% being done by private contractors.

== Jhanda Mela ==
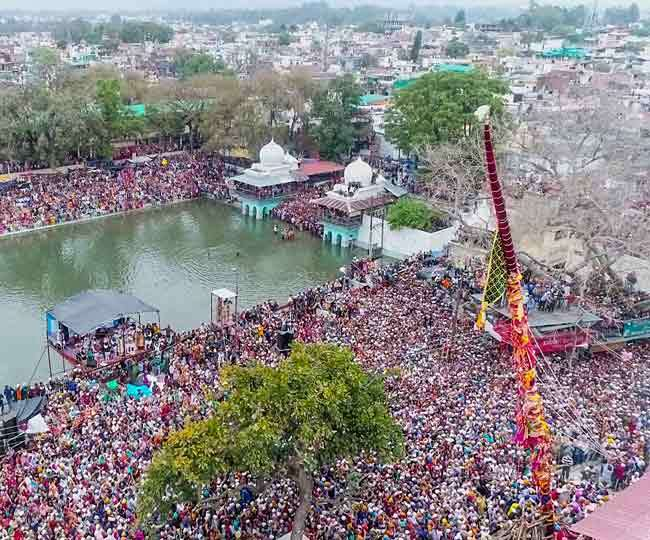
The new flag being erected during the Jhanda Mela in the temple precincts.

The site contains a flag-staff known as the Jhanda Sahib. Jhanda Mela, literally "flag fair", is an annual religious fair that takes place in the temple precincts; it is believed to have been held since 1676. It takes place in March every year. The fair marks the arrival of Baba Ram Rai at the site, and starts five days after the festival of Holi and continues till Rama Navami. The symbolic flag is a hundred-feet tall tree trunk wrapped in layers of clothing. During the fair, devotees, who come from across India and abroad, gather in large numbers and replace the previous year's flag in a religious ceremony.

As per Ajay Sharma, the jhande ji (which originated from Rai Rai as a mark of an encampment) is changed once every three years on the occasion of the fifth day after Holi (corresponding to the birthday of Ram Rai) during the Jhande ka Mela fair. The fair used to be held in the lane adjacent to the Ram Rai Darbar but now it is held at Matawale Bagh. To select the new jhande ji, the tallest Sal tree from the Doodhli jungle is cut-down, cleaned, and brought to site around 30 kilometres away by being carried on the shoulders of the sangat (congregation), where it is bathed and meditated upon. A cloth known as gilaf is wrapped around it, with the top-most velvet cloth being known as the Darshani Gilaf. Each time the jhande ji is changed, a specific family has the duty of preparing the Darshani Gilaf. Halwa prashad is distributed during the occasion.

== Mahants and Gurus ==
The head of Darbar Sahib, called Sajjada Nashin Shri Mahant leads a life of celibacy and dedicates his life to the noble cause of society. They select a successor prior to their death.

1. Shri Mahant Aud Dass (1687-1741)
2. Shri Mahant Har Prasad (1741-1766)
3. Shri Mahant Har Sevak (1766-1818)
4. Shri Mahant Har Swaroop Dass (1818-1842)
5. Shri Mahant Preetam Dass (1842-1854)
6. Shri Mahant Narayan Dass (1854-1885)
7. Shri Mahant Prayag Dass (1885-1896)
8. Shri Mahant Lakshman Dass (1896-1945)
9. Shri Mahant Indiresh Charan Dass (1945-2000)
10. Shri Mahant Devendra Dass (Since 25 June 2000)

== Gallery ==
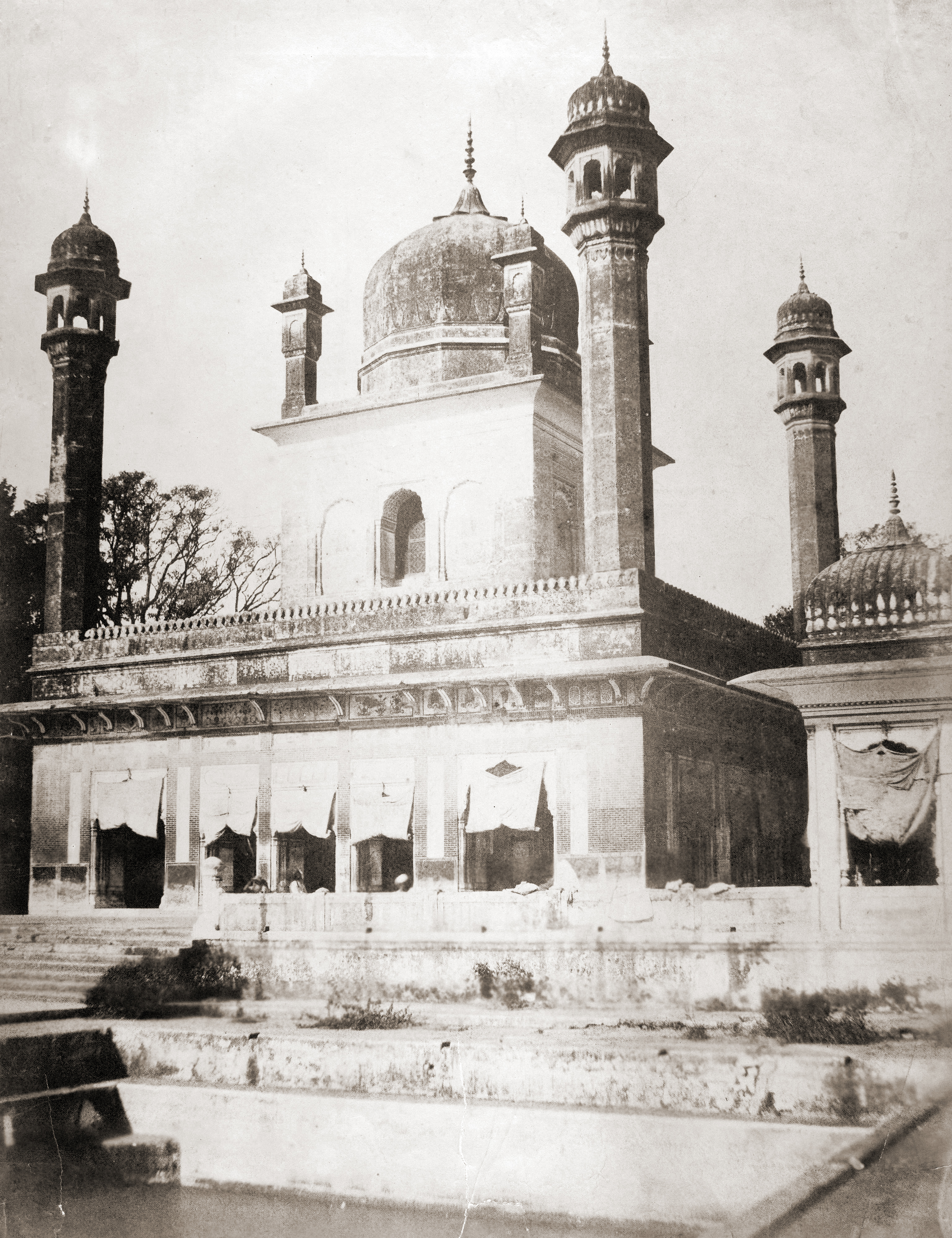
An 1858 photograph of Guru Ram Rai Darbar Sahib taken by Robert Christopher Tytler and Harriet Tyler

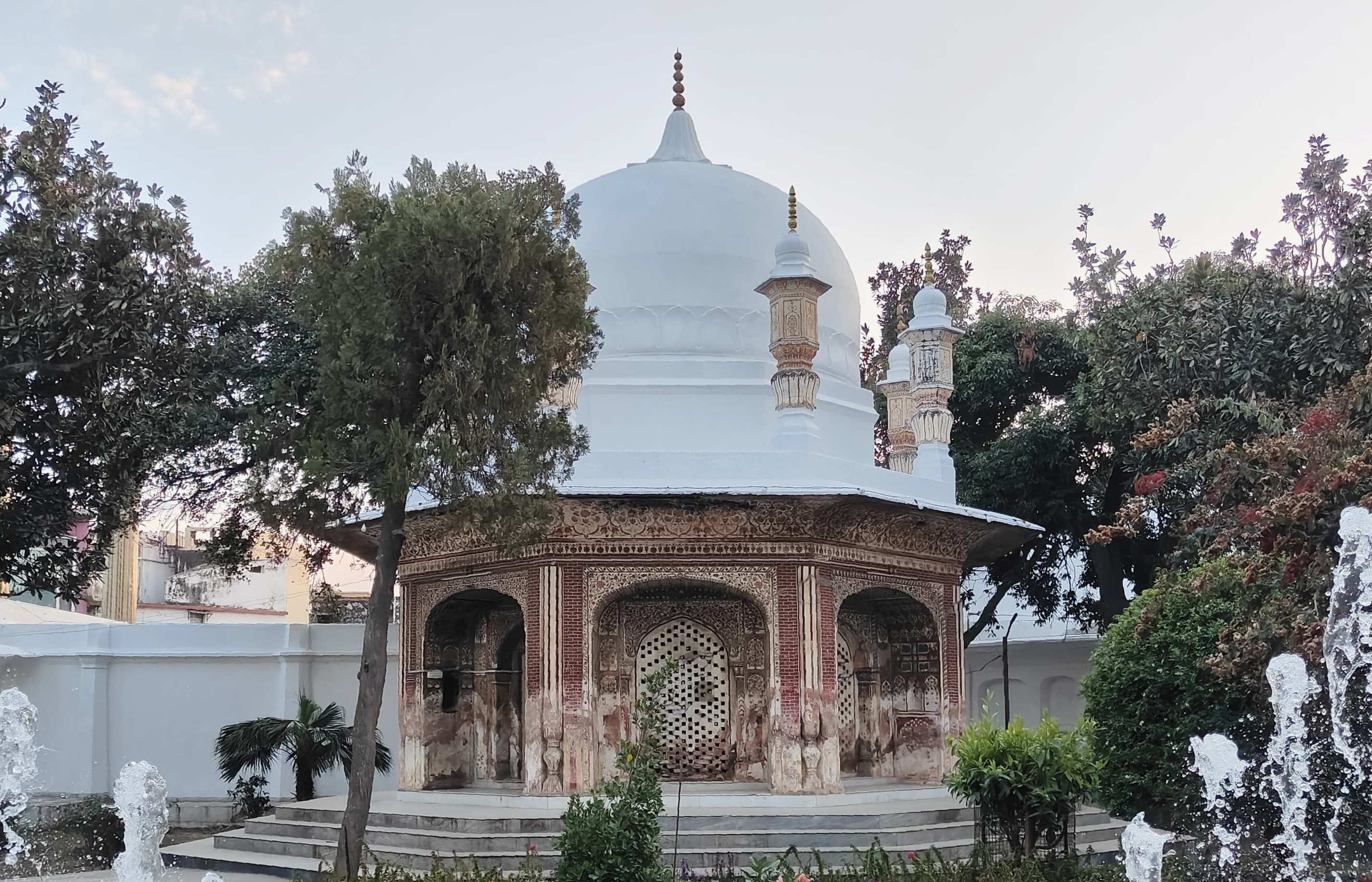
Pavilion at Guru Ram Rai Darbar Sahib, Dehradun

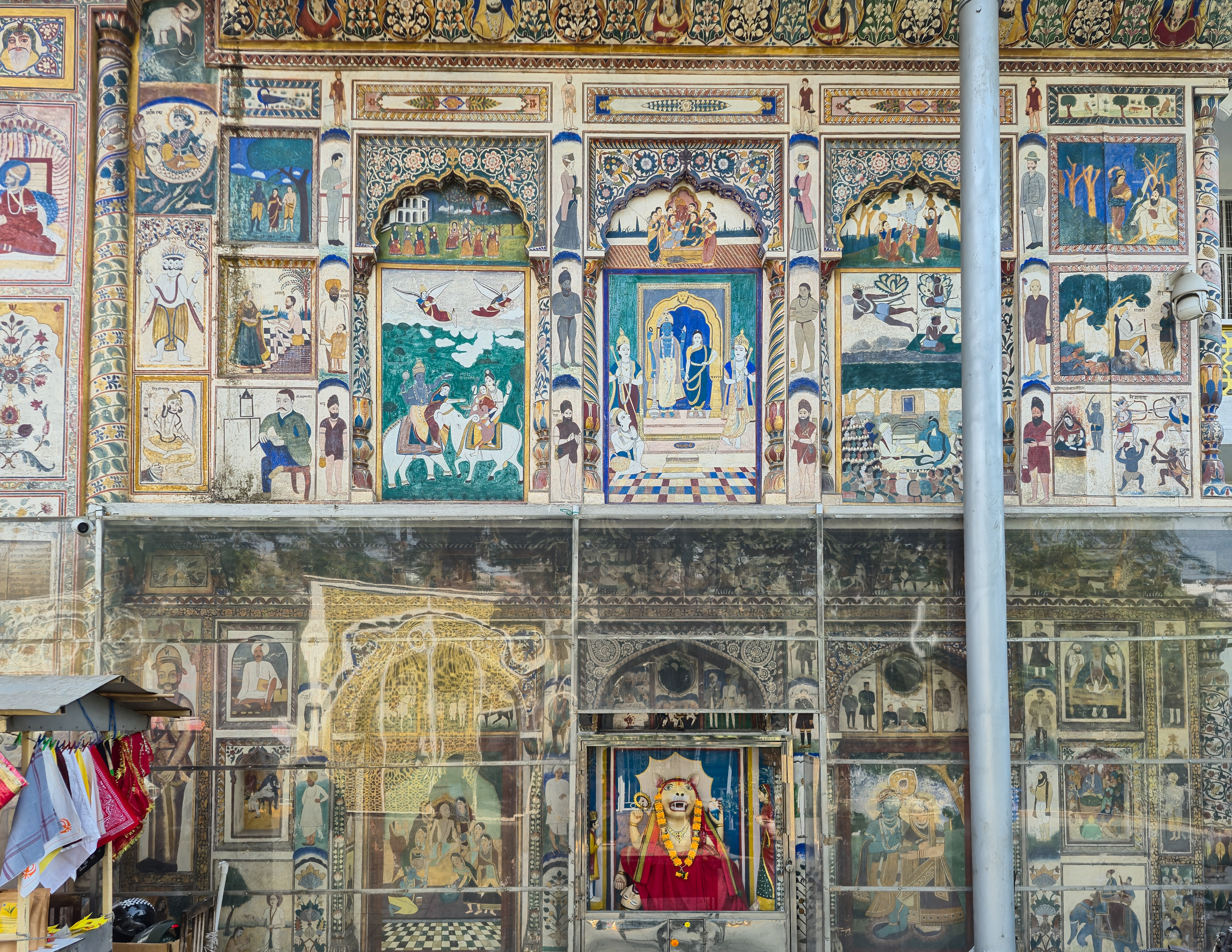
Right side of Main Entrance wall

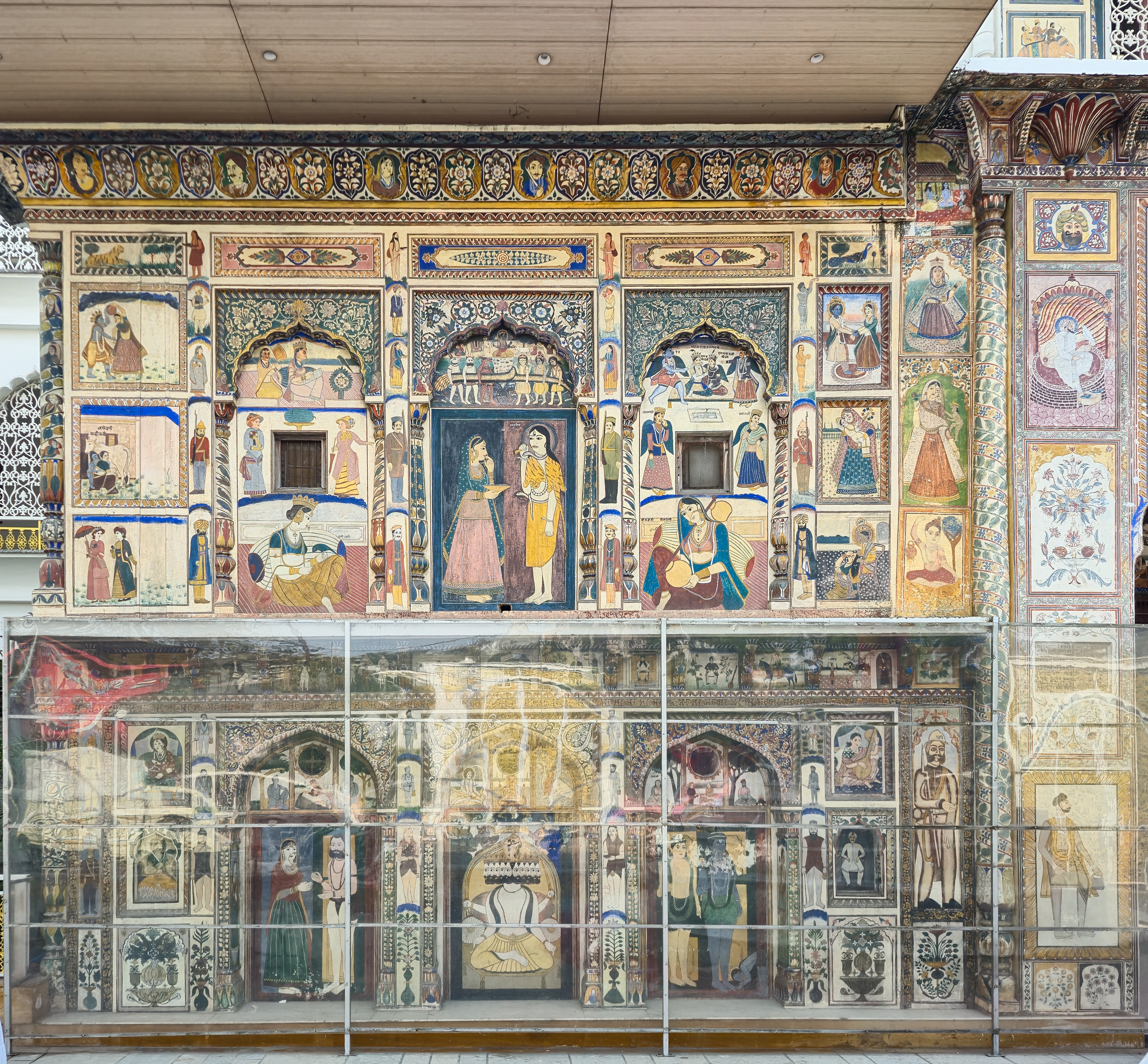
Left side of Main Entrance wall

== Bibliography ==
- Jain, Madhu; Handa, Omacanda. Art and Architecture of Uttarakhand. Pentagon Press. ISBN 9788182744172.
- Kamboj, B. P. (2003). Early Wall Painting of Garhwal. Indus Publishing. ISBN 9788173871399.
