= Rispana River =

River in Uttarakhand, India

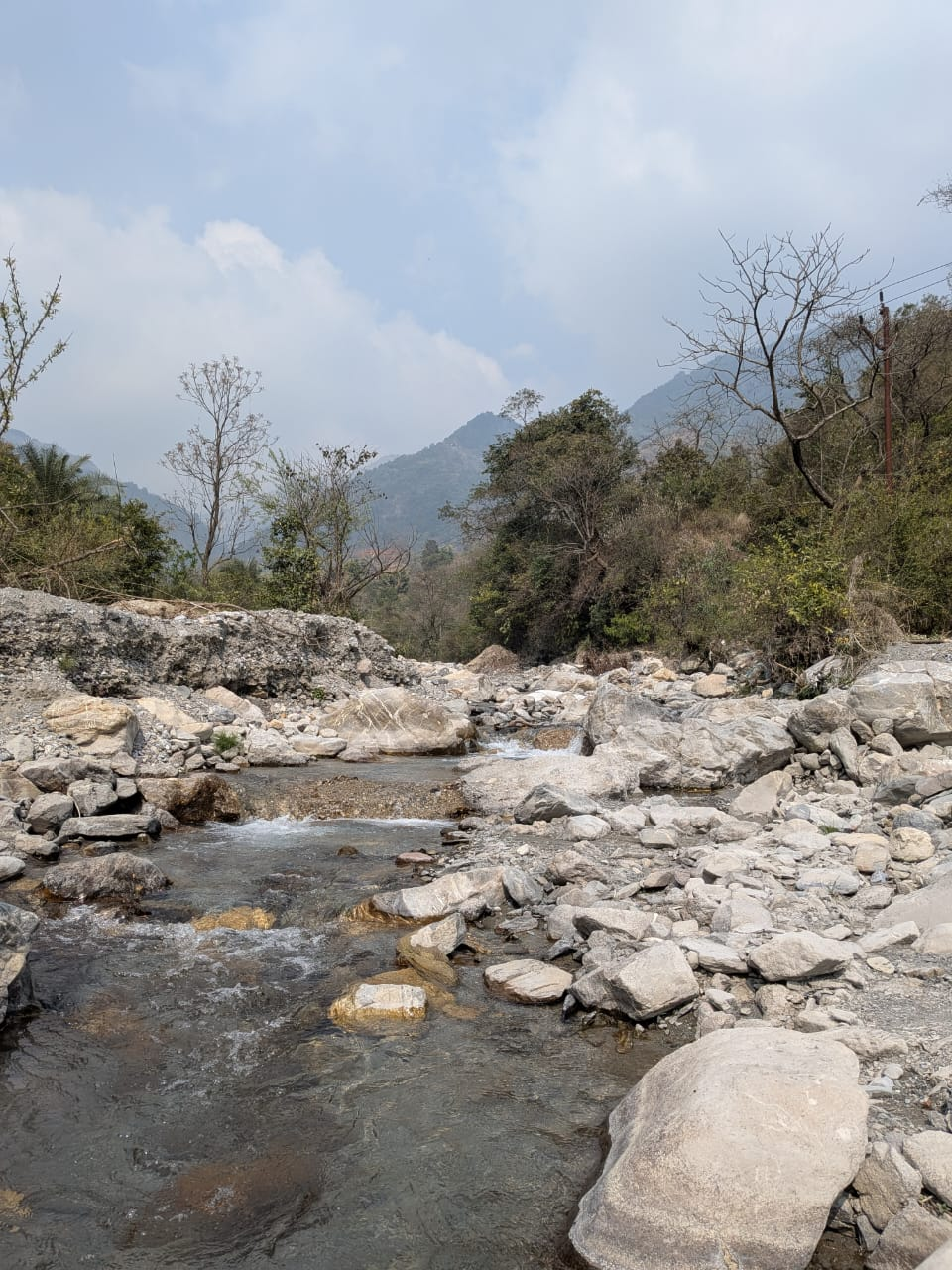
- Rispana River at Raipur Village

Physical characteristics
- Mouth
  - location: Mussoorie, Uttarakhand
- Discharge
  - location: Ganges

Rispana river, which in ancient times was known as Rishiparna, is a tributary of the Song river that originates from Mussoorie, flows through Dehradun and joins the Ganges.

== Origin and course ==
Rispana river originates as a small spring in the Lal Tibba peaks of in the hills of Mussoorie at an elevation of 2279 metres and flows downhill through the towns of Rajpur and Bhata, crossing Mossey falls and Shikhar falls to Dehradun. Rispana River stretches for about 27 kilometers and has a catchment area of 53.45 square kilometers. It is a dry river channel, historically known as 'Rao' in the Doon Valley.

Adjoining the Rispana is another river called Bindal, which also flows through the city of Dehradun and joins Rispana at Mothrowala. After the confluence of the rivers Rispana and Bindal, it is called Suswa. The Suswa river eventually meets river Song which joins river Ganga near Satyanarayana between Rishikesh and Haridwar. The river is situated between latitude 300 29‟ 15” N and longitude to 780 06‟ 98” E. The Toposheets Nos. 53-J3, 53-J4 provides information related to all topographical features.

== Diversion of river water ==
Rispana is known as the lifeline of Doon Valley because it is the major source of water supply to the city of Dehradun. The river has flowed both on the surface and underground hence has played a major role in maintaining the groundwater level in the city.

Review of historical literature indicates that the existence of flour mills and the Rajpur diversion canal indicate that the river was perennial up to the Rajpur Canal Head Works (RCHW) site in the mid of 19th century and maybe downstream too. At present, it is perennial up to Shikhar falls only. About 500 m south of Rajpur village, water of the Rispana is diverted to the Rajpur Canal, built more than 350 years ago for irrigation and drinking water. This canal terminates at the temple tanks of Guru Ram Rai in the heart of Dehradun city.

The river carries significant flow in rainy season till the month of September. However, the flow reduces considerably October onwards. Near Shikhar falls, about 14 MLD is tapped for drinking water supply. After a distance of 2.2 km downstream of Shikhar falls, the river enters doon gravels and usually goes dry during the winter season and summer months.

== Ecological degradation ==
=== Quality of water ===
The water of the river, which was once used for drinking purposes, as of a study done in 2022 was categorised as "very poor quality & unfit for domestic purpose".

=== Flood banks and pollution ===
The rivers Bindal and Rispana are the only outlets for rain water and prevent the city from being engulfed from flood waters. The river Rispana is main carrier of monsoon runoff, but as a result of its flood plains and river course being heavily encroached upon it has become a drain, losing the actual definition of a river. In the Dehradun city, it is highly polluted by both solid and liquid wastes. The discharge of untreated sewage and open defecation on the river bed has deteriorated the health of the river significantly.
