= Song River (India) =

River in Dehradun, Uttarakhand, India

Coordinates: 30°02′N 78°15′E

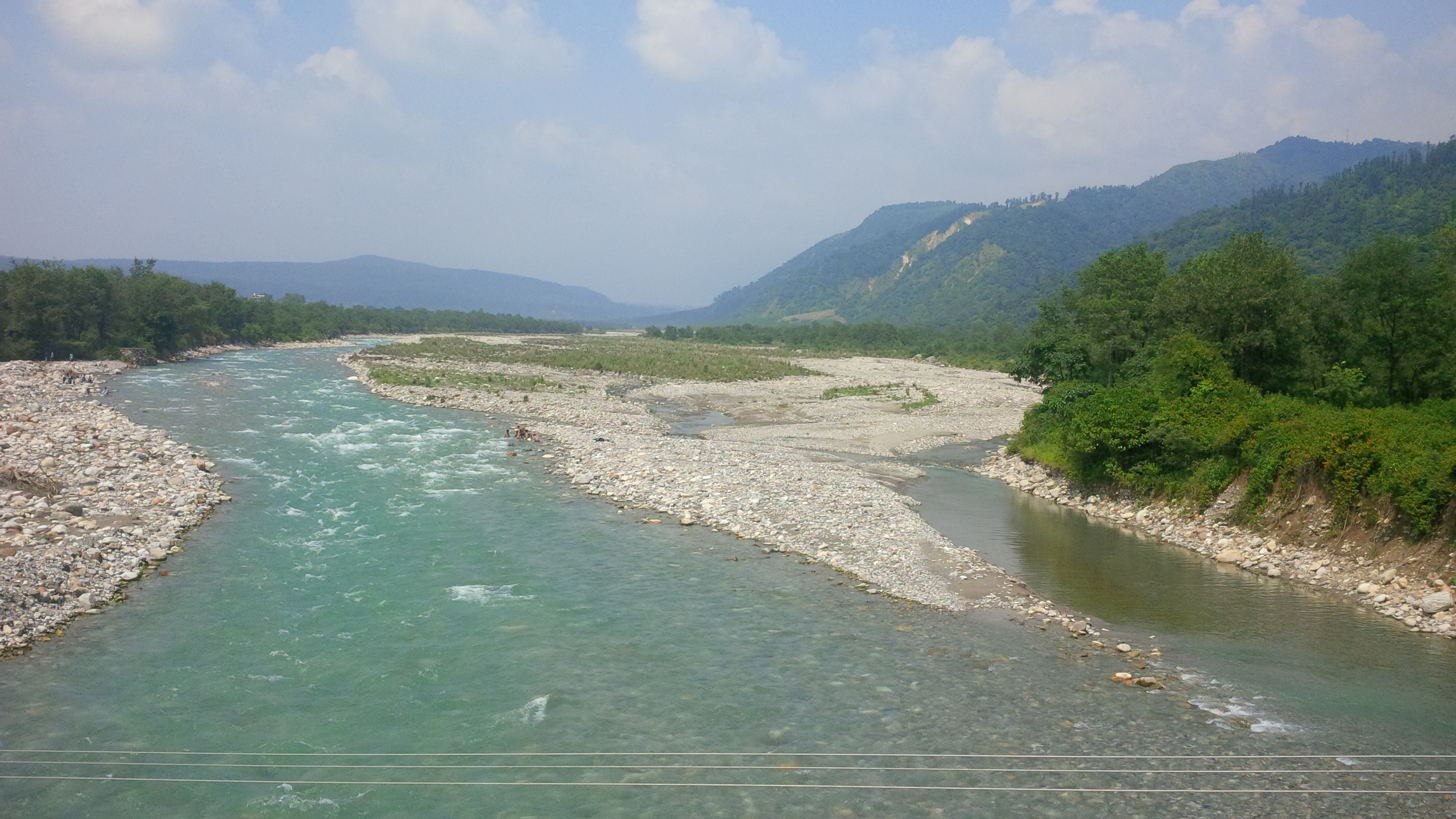
Song River at Raipur

The Song River in Dehradun district drains the central and eastern part of the Doon Valley, in the state of Uttarakhand, India. A tributary of Sooswa river, which in turn is a tributary of the Ganges, it originates as spring-fed stream in the southern slopes of the Radi Top of Mussoorie ridge of the Himalayan range and runs from Dhanaulti towards Narendranagar. As is common in hilly areas, there are several streams running south from the mountains that merge into one river that emerges from the hills a little after Sahastradhara.

Song is one of the largest rivers that drain the Doon Valley traversing 190 km (120 mi), and its tributaries includes, Kali Gad, Bindal River and Rispana River.

== Sahastradhara ==
It is a popular scenic spot for the nature lovers, based on the banks of a tributary of the Song, the Kali Gad. It was more famous for its healing sulphur springs but is now more of a picnic spot with families crowding the waters in the summer.

== Hydrology ==
The Kali Gad merges into the main Song river east of the Kalinga Hill. After this confluence, the Song is a broad river valley, larger than its western counterpart - The Assan River. The river now flows through the valley in a south-eastern direction passing through the regions of Harrawala and Doiwala. It is a perennial river, however the water surges during the monsoon as can be seen from the bridge at Doiwala. The river proceeds southward till it merges with the Sooswa river.

The Sooswa in turn originates from the southern Shivalik range separating the Doon valley from Saharanpur district and Haridwar district, collecting water from several small streams, including the once perennial Rispana. It flows westwards to Doiwala and can be seen through thick forest from the train running from Haridwar to Dehradun. The river then flows through the forest of Kansrao before its confluence with the Ganges at Raiwala.

== Irrigation ==
The Song River has a great significance in the field of irrigation of various agricultural areas of Dehradun. A canal was constructed in the 18th century from the River at Kalinga, Maldevta to irrigate the large agricultural area of Raipur. The areas of Balawala, Nathuawala, Nakronda, Gularghati, Harrawala and Ranjhawala are the ones which are benefitted with this Irrigation Canal System. Various other canals are drawn out from this River at Lachhiwala to irrigate the large agricultural area of Doiwala. The areas of Bhaniyawala, Jolly Grant, Badowala are the ones benefitted with this Irrigation Canal System.
