= History of Uttarakhand =

Uttarakhand
- State
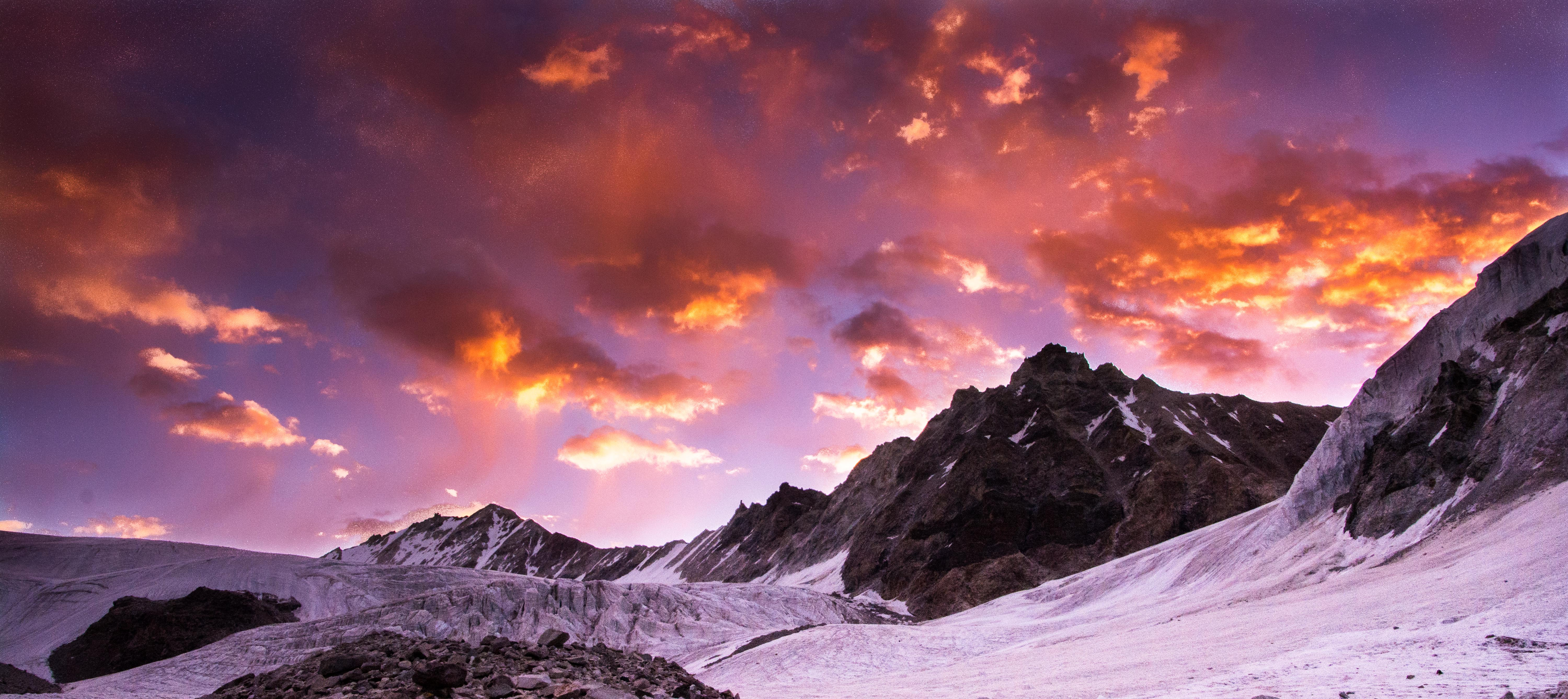
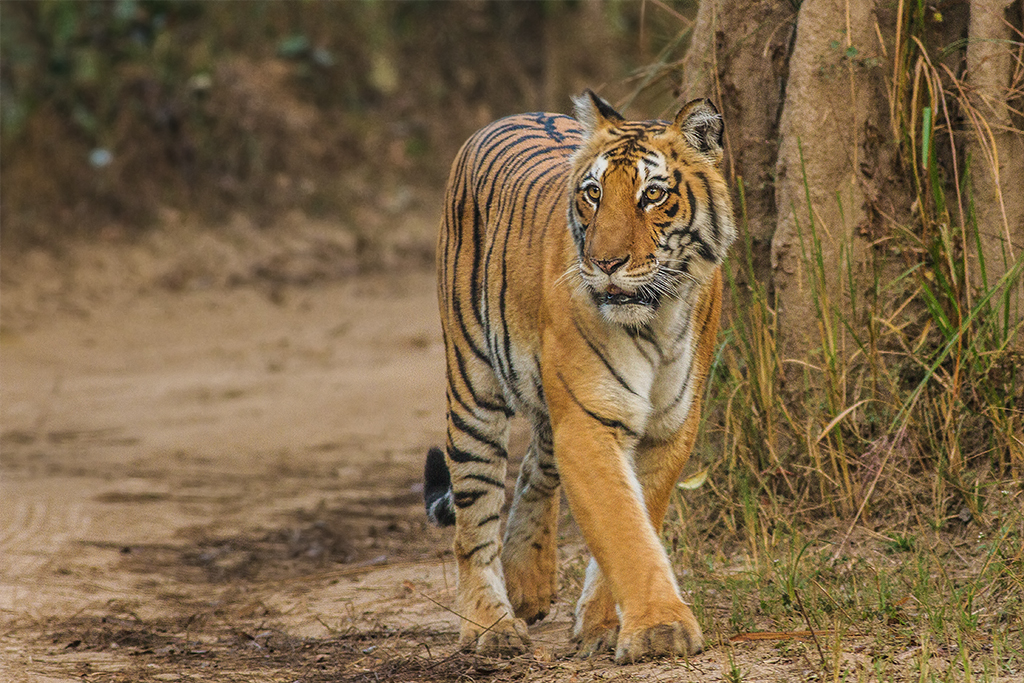
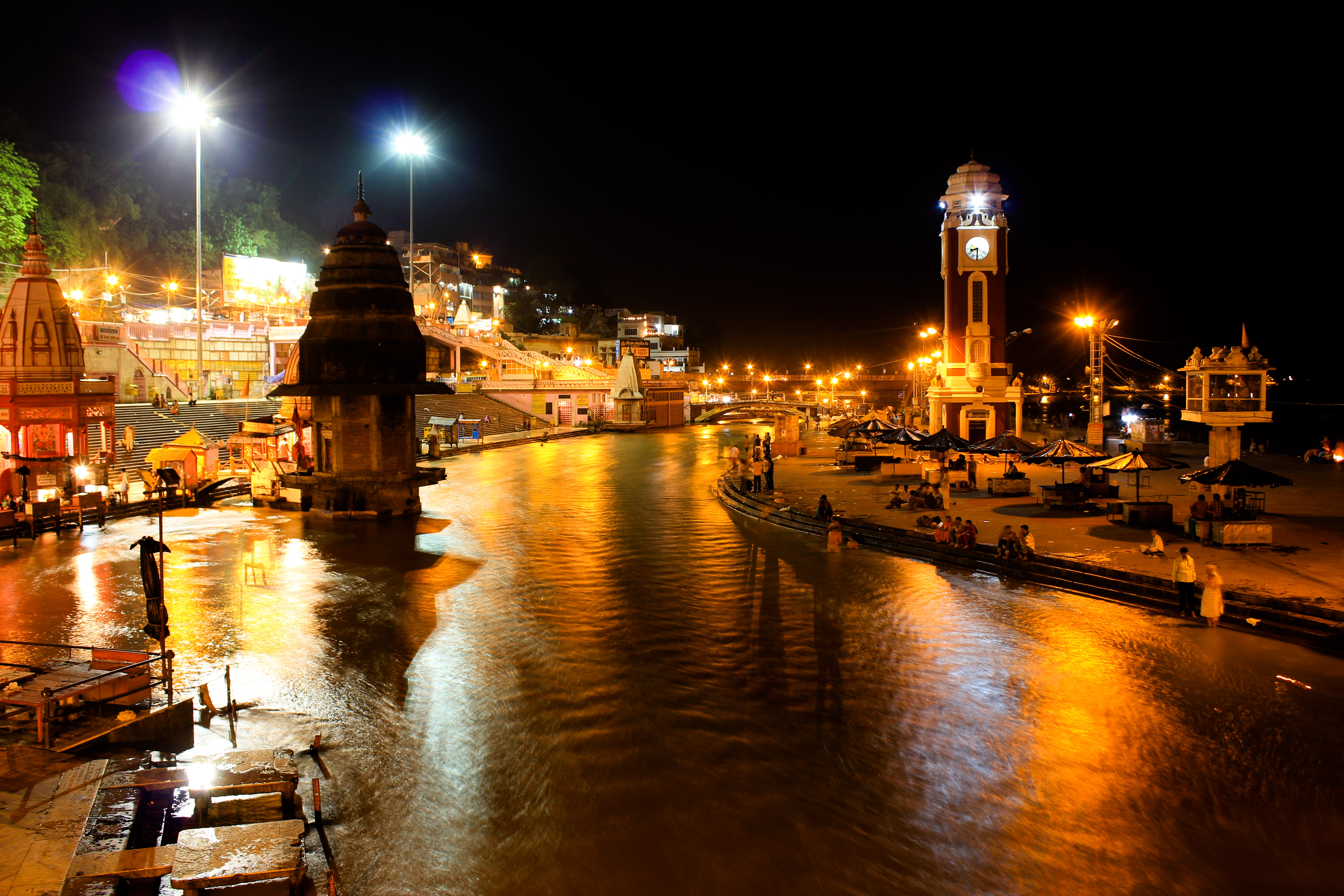
- Uttarakhand photos : Sunrise at Kalindi in the Himalayas; Bengal Tiger at Jim Corbett National Park; Ganges at Har Ki Pauri, Haridwar
- Nickname: Devbhoomi

Uttarakhand is a Himalayan state in North India, nestled between the Tibetan Plateau and the Indo-Gangetic Plains. The name, which means "northern land" or "section" or "northern part" in Sanskrit was made popular in the 80s as part of the wider statehood struggle within the region.

Present day Uttarakhand comprises the historical administrative Garhwal and Kumaon divisions.

== Early history ==
Initially, it was believed that due to harsh climate and mountainous terrain, this was a barren and uninhabited land. But after various excavations and the study of ancient literature, it is now established that the history of Uttarakhand goes back to Stone Age. Evidences of Stone Age settlements have been found in various parts of Kumaon and Garhwal, particularly notable are the rock shelters at Lakhudyar, Almora.

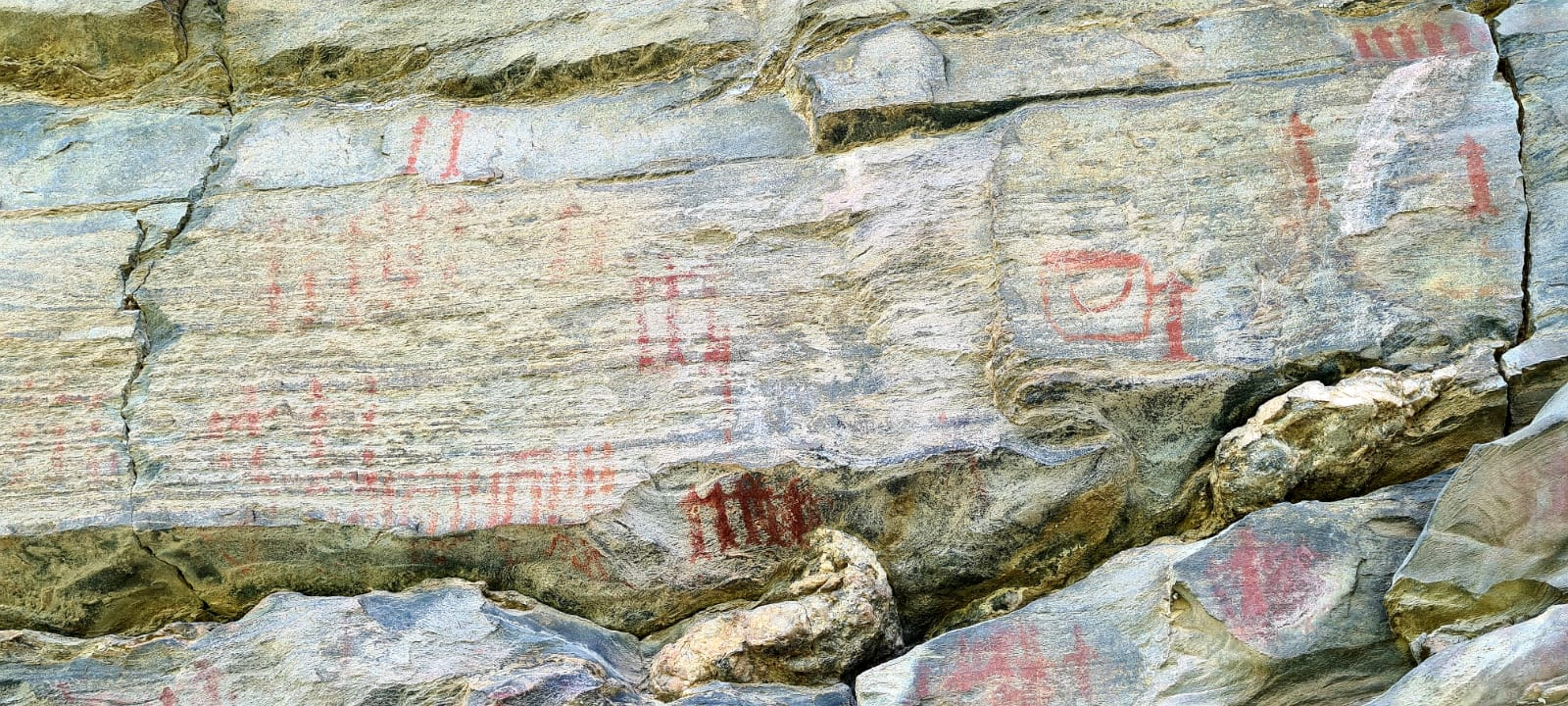

In the Puranas, Uttarakhand was the ancient term for the central Indian Himalayas. The region is mentioned in early Hindu texts as the combined region of Kedarkhand and Manaskhand. Its peaks and valleys were referred to as the Svarga loka: a temporary abode of the righteous, and the source of the Ganges.

Uttarakhand is popularly referred to as "the land of the gods" (Devbhumi) owing to its huge number of Hindu pilgrimage sites.

The Pauravas, Kushanas, Kunindas, Guptas, Katyuris, Palas, Chands, Parmars (or Panwars), and the British have ruled the state by turns.

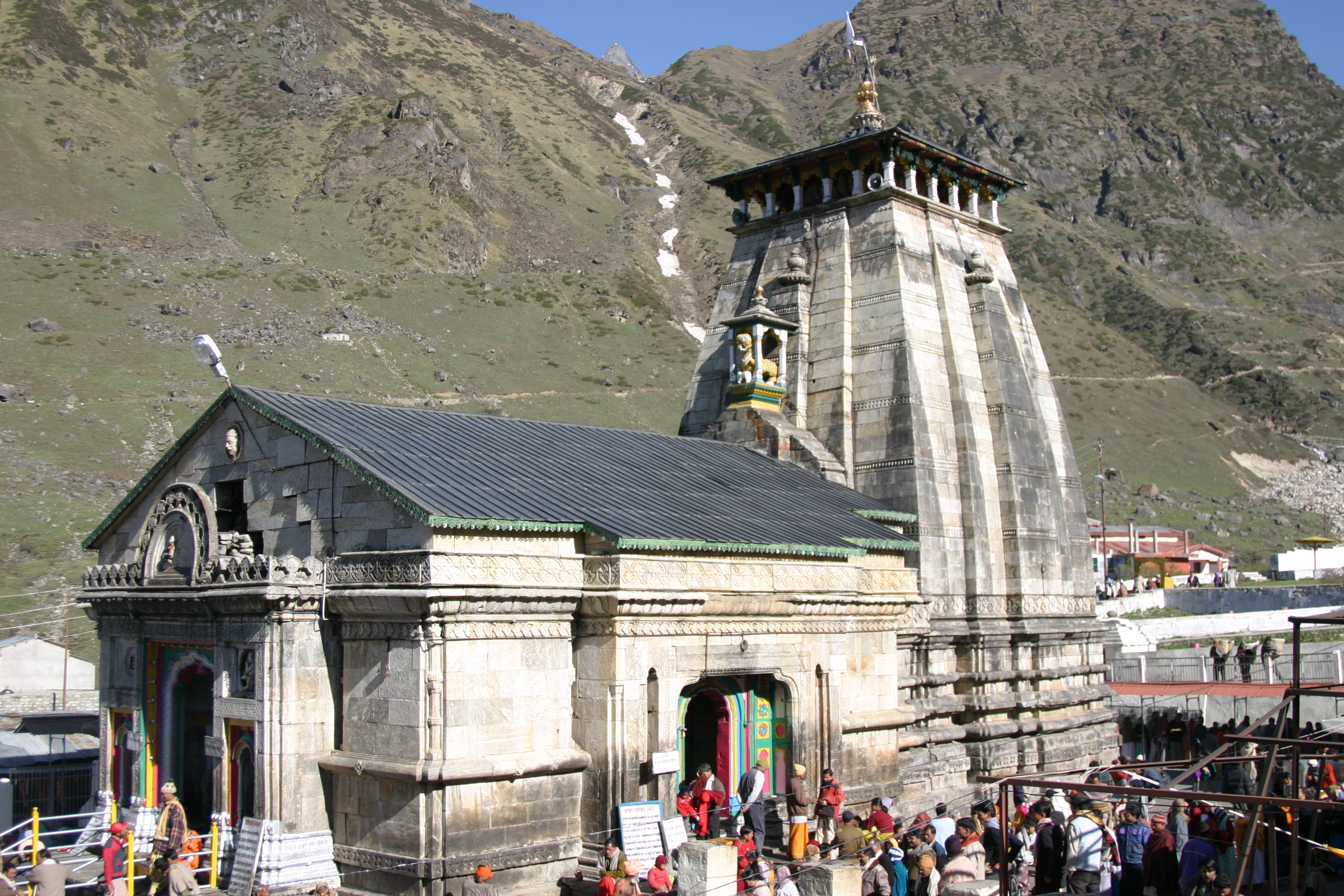
Kedarnath Temple, a Hindu pilgrimage site

The region was initially habitated by Kolarian people, some scholars believed that these people were outcast by their tribes. Later, Indo - Aryans tribe began to arrive from Central Asia. The prominent among them were the Khasas, Khasas later fought with the aboriginals and finally defeated them. Khasa men married the local women in large numbers, this intermixing continued over centuries and is now verified by ancestry tests.

The region formed a part of the Uttarakuru Kingdom during the Vedic age of Ancient India. It is believed that the rishi (sage) Vyasa wrote the Mahabharata somewhere in present-day Uttarakhand, since the Pandavas are believed to have travelled (and camped) in the region.

Among the first major dynasties of the Garhwal and Kumaon Kingdoms were the Kunindas in the 2nd century BC, who practised an early form of Shaivism and traded salt with western Tibet. Ashokan edicts at Kalsi show the early presence of Buddhism in this regionGarhwal Kito have settled in the northern highlands and elsewhere in the region, are believed to be the ancestors of the present-day Bhotiya, Raji, Buksha, and Tharu peoples.

== Post medieval history ==
Kumaon prospered under the Chand kings from the eighth to the 18th centuries. The Pahari School of Miniature Painting was also flourished in the region between the 18th to the 19th centuries.[3]

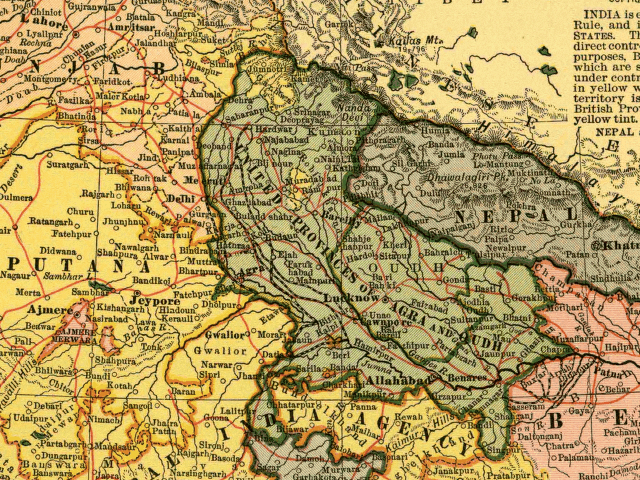
Uttarakhand as part of the United Provinces, 1903

Nepal's expanding Gurkha Empire overran Almora, the seat of the Kumaon Kingdom, in 1791and in 1804 the Garhwal Kingdom also fell to the Gurkhas. With the end of the Anglo-Nepalese War in 1816, the western Garhwal Kingdom was re-established in Tehri; eastern Garhwal and Kumaon were ceded to the British in accordance with the Treaty of Sugauli. Jaunsar-Bawar was part of the Sirmur kingdom, primarily as a buffer between Sirmur and Garhwal. Fateh Shah seized the region and Dehradun from the Sirmur kings, the Jaunsari and the local pahari; Sirmaur-era words are still found in the Jaunsari language. In 1829, Jaunsar-Bawar was incorporated into the Chakrata tehsil; it had been part of the Punjab state of Sirmur until the British conquered it and Dehradun after the 1814 war with the Gurkhas. The region was known as Jaunsar-Bawar before the establishment of a British Indian Army cantonment in 1866, and the name continued in popular use until the early 20th century. Although Western Hindi is popular in most of the neighbouring hill areas, Jaunsari (a Western Pahari language) is spoken by most people in the region.

== Statehood movement ==
After Indian independence, the Tehri princely state was merged into Uttar Pradesh (where Uttarakhand consisted of the Garhwal and Kumaon divisions). Until 1998, Uttarakhand was the name most commonly used to refer to the region as political groups (including the Uttarakhand Kranti Dal, founded in 1979) began advocating statehood under its banner. Although the former hill kingdoms of Garhwal and Kumaon were traditional rivals with diverse linguistic and cultural influences; due to the proximity of different, neighbouring ethnic groups, their shared geography, economy, and traditions created strong bonds between the regions. These bonds were Uttarakhand's new political identity, which gained significant momentum when the demand for statehood in 1994 received near-unanimous acceptance among the local population and national political parties. The 1/2 October 1994 Rampur Tiraha firing case caused an uproar which eventually led to the creation of Uttarakhand from Uttar Pradesh in 2000.

The term Uttaranchal came into use when the Bharatiya Janata Party (BJP)-led central and Uttar Pradesh state governments began a state reorganisation in 1998 and introduced their preferred name. The BJP name triggered controversy among separate-state activists, who saw it as a political act. In August 2006, India's Union Cabinet agreed to the four-year-old demand of the Uttaranchal state assembly and Uttarakhand-movement leaders to rename Uttaranchal Uttarakhand. Legislation to that effect was passed by the State Legislative Assembly in October 2006, passed in the winter session of Parliament, and signed into law by the president in December of that year.
