= Ram Rai =

Ex-communicated son of Guru Har Rai

Baba Ram Rai
- ਰਾਮ ਰਾਏ
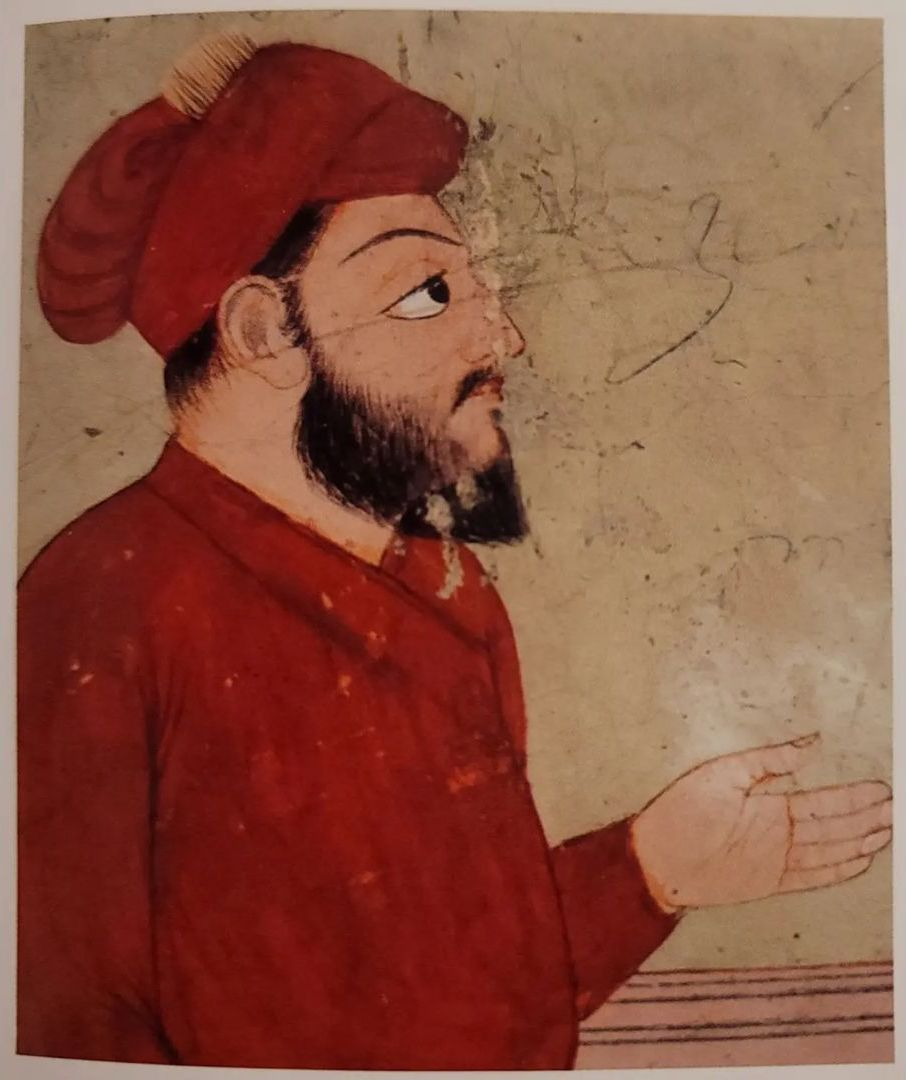
- Detail of Ram Rai from a mural depicting Guru Nanak and Ram Rai listening to hymns together under a tree from the Bhai Bahlo Darwaza of the Darbar of Ram Rai in Dehradun, circa 1707–1710

Head of Ramraiya sect
- Preceded by: None (founder)
- Succeeded by: Aud Dass (mahant)

Personal life
- Born: 11 March 1646
- Died: 4 September 1687 (aged 41) Guru Ram Rai Darbar Sahib, Dehradun
- Spouse: Raj Kaur (d. 1698); Maluki (d. 1701); Panjab Kaur (d. 1742); Lal Kaur (d. 1698)
- Parents: Guru Har Rai (father); Mata Sulakhni (mother)
- Other name: Guru Ram Rai
- Relatives: Guru Har Krishan (brother)

Religious life
- Religion: Sikhism
- Sect: Ramraiya

Ram Rai (Gurmukhi: ਰਾਮ ਰਾਏ; rāma rā'ē; 11 March 1646 – 4 September 1687 or 1689) was the excommunicated eldest son of the seventh Sikh Guru, Guru Har Rai, and the founder of the Ramraiyas, an unorthodox and heretical sect in Sikhism, classified as a type of Udasi. He became an Udasi after being ex-communicated by his father. After his excommunication, he founded the Guru Ram Rai Darbar Sahib, a Darbar in Dehradun which was built in Indo-Islamic architecture style.

== Early life ==
Ram Rai was born on 11 March 1646 as the eldest son of Guru Har Rai and Mata Sulakhani. He was raised in Kiratpur. The guruship of his father was a time of peace. Starting at the age of 14, he was educated in religion (such as memorizing, understanding, and interpreting the Guru Granth Sahib) and warfare.

== Ex-communication ==
In June 1658, Dara Shikoh had a meeting with Ram Rai's father, Guru Har Rai. Eventually, Aurangzeb was victorious in the Mughal war of succession and secured his power in the realm. After Sikhs assisted the fleeing Dara Shikoh in the aftermath of the Battle of Samugarh, Aurangzeb demanded that the Sikh Guru explain his actions. As per Santokh Singh's Suraj Prakash, Guru Har Rai was puzzled regarding the order from the emperor and found a meeting pointless due him not being a political ruler, nor owing taxes, and nor did he request or need anything from the emperor. Ram Rai was chosen by his father to represent him in the Mughal darbar (court) to explain why he had supported and given refuge to Dara Shikoh, during the Mughal war of succession. Guru Har Rai advised his son to answer the emperor's queries honestly and directly, study the Guru Granth Sahib while travelling there, and to answer any questions without fear. Ram Rai was dispatched from Kiratpur to Delhi on 30 March 1661 and was accompanied by an entourage of Sikhs, including Diwan Dargah Mal. Ram Rai was also accompanied by Bhai Bahlo/Balaun (who would accompany Ram Rai throughout his life and was a talented brick-layer who played a role in the construction of the Harimandir in Amritsar) and Bhai Sangat Das. However, according to W. H. McLeod, the Mughal emperor had actually ordered the Sikh guru to dispatch his son to him to act as a hostage due to the guru's earlier support for Dara Shikoh.

During this meeting, the emperor complained that a verse from the Adi Granth was "anti-Islamic", in-response to this claim by the emperor, Ram Rai altered the words of the verse, which changed the context, instead of standing firm to his faith entirely. This had pleased the emperor. According to Ajay Sharma, a maulvi approached Ram Rai and requested that he explain a specific verse that states mitti musalman. The verse is attributed to Guru Nanak from the Āsā dī Vār:

Mitti Musalman ki, pere pai ghumiar,
Ghar bhande itan kian, jahdi kale pukar.

— Guru Nanak, Āsā kī Vār
Translation:

The ashes of Muslims find their way into the potter's clod,
Pots and bricks are made out of them, they cry out as they're fired.

Ram Rai explained the verse by stating that the word Musalmān (Muslim) was inserted due to a copyist's prejudice and was not found in the original text, with the actual word being beīmān (faithless or evil), therefore making the verse mean "'the ashes of the faithless" rather than "the ashes of Muslims". However, this was incorrect as the original word was indeed musalman and Ram Rai did this to please the Mughal audience. The emperor and his advisors had though the verse promoted the cremation of a Muslim's remains (when it actually refers to the futility of dividing humanity based upon funerary practices) so were pleased by Ram Rai's misquotation. The Sikhs who had accompanied Ram Rai sent a report on what occurred to Guru Har Rai. When Ram Rai was recalled to Kiratpur for his mother's funeral, he was entirely shunned by his father for altering a verse in the scripture. Ram Rai took his mother's ashes to Haridwar for dispersal, when he returned to Kiratpur he was informed that he was expelled from the Sikh religion.

Ram Rai was excommunicated from the mainstream Sikh community by his father Guru Har Rai, after he learnt that his eldest son had altered gurbani to please Aurangzeb and nominated his younger son, Har Krishan, as next-in-line for the Sikh guruship before he died on 6 October 1661. This had foiled the plans of the Mughal emperor, who was keeping Ram Rai as a hostage, as he had been hoping that the Sikh guruship would pass onto Ram Rai so that he could enact control over the wider Sikh community by manipulating their titular head.

== Relationship with the Mughals ==
As per McLeod, Aurangzeb wanted Ram Rai to become a supporter of Mughal authority. He became a favourite of Aurangzeb, purportedly due to his willingness to perform miracles for the Mughal emperor. Ram Rai was granted a jagir in the Garhwal plateau region. Ram Rai settled in the area after Mughal emperor ordered in 1675 Raja Fateh Shah of Garhwal to bestow land to Ram Rai for a missionary seat (ḍerā) in the dūn (valley), with this settlement becoming Dehradun (Dehrā Dūn). The Ramraiyan sect came into being through this. However, his sect was shunned by mainstream Sikhs. The sect bears similarities to Udasi ascetics, having been co-opted by Udasis of the Bhai Balu Hasna tradition after the death of Punjab Kaur in 1741.

=== Miracles ===
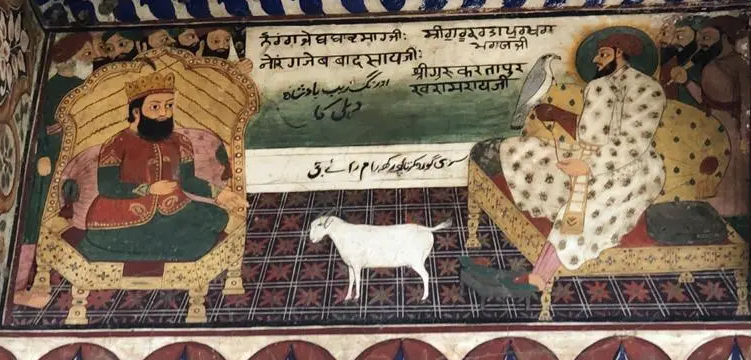
Ram Rai (right) meeting Mughal Emperor Aurangzeb (left) and displaying his supposed magical powers. A three-legged goat is depicted between them. Fresco art from Jhanda Sahib, Dehradun.

According to legend, Ram Rai performed the following miracles for Aurangzeb to prove he possesses siddha and shakti after being tested:

- Being able to wear a cloak quenched in 46 types of poison without being harmed
- A carpet and cushion were placed over a pit for Ram Rai to sit on and fall into, however he was able to sit on it without falling
- Aurangzeb asked Ram Rai to provide him a fruit that cannot be found in India, with Ram Rai lifting up his hand and the fruit appearing
- When Aurangzeb asked Ram Rai for advice regarding his reign, hunting, and military campaigns, whatever Ram Rai said would come true
- Conjuring a three-legged goat: As per the legend, when Ram Rai visited Delhi, Aurangzeb gifted him with a normal, four-legged goat. Some time later, Aurangzeb requested the goat to be returned but instead Ram Rai presented a miraculous three-legged goat and told Aurangzeb to get his men to restore the goat's fourth-leg. Three, separate mural paintings at the Ram Rai Darbar depict the goat miracle.

== Establishment of Dehradun and relationship to the later Sikh gurus ==
Guru Ram Rai Darbar Sahib, Dehradun

Ram Rai's brother, Guru Har Krishan, was the eighth of the ten Sikh Gurus. According to Udasi literature, Ram Rai met his younger brother, Har Krishan, in Delhi. He may have also assisted him with treating cholera victims during a Delhi outbreak. After his younger brother's death, the Udasi writings claim that Ram Rai performed his cremation and immersed his ashes at Haridwar. After doing-so, he went to Dehradun. The Udasi tradition also claims Ram Rai was in Delhi when Guru Tegh Bahadur was executed and that Ram Rai also performed his dismembered body's cremation. Aurangzeb decided to exile Ram Rai to Dehradun to prevent a fight between Ram Rai and Guru Gobind Singh over the Sikh guruship.

After the execution of Guru Tegh Bahadur, Ram Rai had requested to leave the emperor's service and to have his own spiritual headquarters, seeking for it to be located between the Ganges and Yamuna. After, Ram Rai followed the Yamuna river and encamped at the village of Bilaspur Kandli on the Chhoti Tons River. Aurangzeb issued a decree (farman) to the Raja of Garhwal to allow Ram Rai to settle in his domain. Ram Rai arrived in the area in 1675 with Raja Fateh Shah of Garhwal bestowed him with six or seven villages in the Doon Valley. After the grant, Ram Rai explored the area and came across the present location of Dehradun, which he liked due to its altitude and the availability of water. In the valley, Ram Rai established his dera (camp), which led to the founding of Dehradun. Dehradun became populated by Ram Rai's followers, as on his birthday falling on the fifth day of Holi, sangat from the areas of Punjab and Bulandshahr (located in present-day Uttar Pradesh) would visit his dera and the area became a place of commerce, with the villages of Dhamawala and Khurbura becoming populated. Ram Rai started becoming associated with the Udasi sect during this time at Dehradun. Another influential sect of the area were the Gorakhpanthis.

A sectoral belief was that Ram Rai possessed the ability to teleport and visit distant congregations in such a manner. As per lore, Ram Rai would retreat to his bedroom and inform his mahants and Punjab Kaur to not disturb him while he was sleeping as he had teleported to visit distant devotees by his soul leaving his body.

Ram Rai always remained at Dehradun and only left after Guru Gobind Singh invited him for a meeting at Paonta, where a meeting is believed to have taken place between the two figures. Ram Rai constructed Gurdwara Chubacha Sahib in Dharampura, Lahore district, where he believed Guru Nanak had stayed.

=== Forgiveness by Guru Gobind Singh ===
According to Sikh accounts, by the time of Guru Gobind Singh's time on the gurgaddi, Ram Rai had become remorseful of his actions and asked to meet the 10th guru of the Sikhs, after learning about the exploits of the guru in 1685 at Sirmaur state. However, any proposed meeting would have to be conducted in relative secrecy as the masands of Ram Rai were overzealous against any potential reconciliation between Ram Rai and the mainstream Sikhs. A meeting between the two is said to have taken place between Dehradun and Paonta Sahib on the banks of the river Yamuna. Another version states that the two met on a boat in the middle of the Yamuna river to settle their differences. The guru forgave Ram Rai for his past transgressions. As a result, it is said Ram Rai left no heir apparent to lead his sect after him.

== Patronage of art ==
Painting of Ram Rai holding a bird of prey whilst standing, circa 1685

Ram Rai was one of the first known Sikh patrons of artwork, perhaps owing to his long stay in Delhi and subsequent influence from the Mughal court. The mahant of the Ram Rai Darbar complex has a collection of at-least 22 miniature paintings in the Mughal-style, which depict both Hindu and Sikh themes. It consists of 16 portraits, the portray the Sikh gurus (except for Guru Tegh Bahadur and Guru Gobind Singh), Kabir with his son Kamal, and Rama and Sita. Some of them depict Janamsakhi scenes. They are all dated to c. 1685, except for one of Guru Nanak which is dated to c. 1689. Their creation has been attributed to Ram Rai. These miniature paintings later served as the basis for some of the wall paintings depicting the Sikh gurus at the Bhai Bahlo Darwaza, dated to c. 1707–1710.

== Marriages ==
He had four wives, Maluki Devi (d. 1701, also known as Malukiwala), Raj Kaur (d. 1698), Lal Kaur (d. 1698), and Panjab Kaur (d. 1742). All four of his wives have samadhs (cenotaphs) located in Dehradun.

== Death ==
As per The Encyclopaedia of Sikhism, Ram Rai died at Dehradun on 4 September 1687. Historical accounts, such as Shahid Bilas by Sewa Singh blame the demise of Ram Rai on a masand named Gurbakhsh, who, along with other masands, is recorded as burning Ram Rai alive while he was meditating in September 1687. However, Lokesh Ohri states that Ram Rai died in 1689. The motive for the murder was to capture his wealth and property. Ram Rai's remains were subsequently cremated against his widow's, Panjab Kaur's, wishes.

According to local legend, due to the wealth of the dera, from its revenue from the land grant, a few masands of the site became corrupted. Ram Rai retired to his bedroom for a teleportation, he did not come out for three days. Several masands, eager to claim the site property due to its wealth, broke into Ram Rai's room and discovered him dead. His widow Punjab Kaur thought her husband was still in a teleportation trip rather than actually being dead, so she rushed back to Dehradun but the masands had already cremated Ram Rai's remains. After this, Punjab Kaur wrote to Guru Gobind Singh at Paonta Sahib (Ram Rai was the uncle of the guru) to punish the masands who had cremated Ram Rai before Punjab Kaur could confirm her husband's death.

Guru Gobind Singh intervened to have Panjab Kaur take over the affairs of the dera. The site became managed by his widow, Mata Punjab Kaur, and two mahants, namely Oudh Das and Har Prasad. As Ram Rai had no children, instead a mahant would succeed him spiritually. After his death, he was succeeded as head of the sect by either mahant Aud Dass or Har Prasad, the successor was helped by Ram Rai's widow, Panjab Kaur. (Note: According to the tradition of the Guru Ram Rai Darbar Sahib, Aud Das was the successor to Ram Rai. However, Henry George Walton in the British Garhwal: A Gazetteer, regards Har Prasad as the successor.) Gurbakhsh became a pretender to the Ramraiya guruship at the Lahore ashram and later clashed with Khalsa Sikhs.

Aurangzeb sent craftsmen to construct a mausoleum for Ram Rai. Panjab Kaur oversaw the construction work of the structure, which was completed in 1707. It was decorated in Mughal-style paintings of floral motifs and calligraphy and surrounded by Mughal gateways.

== Bibliography ==
- Jain, Madhu; Handa, Omacanda (July 2009). Art and Architecture of Uttarakhand. Pentagon Press. ISBN 9788182744172.
