= Asa di Vār =

Sikh scripture

Asa di Vār (Gurmukhi: ਆਸਾ ਦੀ ਵਾਰ) meaning "A ballad of hope", also spelt as Asa ki Vār, is a collection of 24 stanzas (pauris) in the Guru Granth Sahib, from ang 462 to ang 475.

Some people argue that the founder of Sikhism, Guru Nanak Dev, wrote the first 9 stanzas together on one occasion and later wrote 15 more on a different occasion; however, some Sikh scholars believe that the whole vaar was written at the same place as the vaar itself proceeds in a definite uniformity. The whole vaar was compiled by Guru Arjan, the fifth Guru, in 1604 AD.

== History ==
According to Christopher Shackle, the work was composed by Guru Nanak. When Guru Arjan was compiling the Guru Granth Sahib, he added a few sloks of Guru Nanak and in some cases Guru Angad, the second Guru. These sloks are tied together in a way that they relate to the same theme as highlighted in the pauri. In its present form, the Asa Di Var contains a few more shabads recited by Guru Ram Das, the fourth Sikh Guru.

In the second half of the 19th century, a number of Asa di Vaar printed editions (Pōthī Āsādī Wār) were published as pothis, including at Lahore in 1873, 1874 (in Perso-Arabic script), 1875 (in Perso-Arabic script), 1876, and 1877. A translation of the prayer by Max Arthur Macauliffe with a short introduction was published in 1901.
