= Fateh Shah =

Raja of Garhwal from 1660 to 1708

- Raja
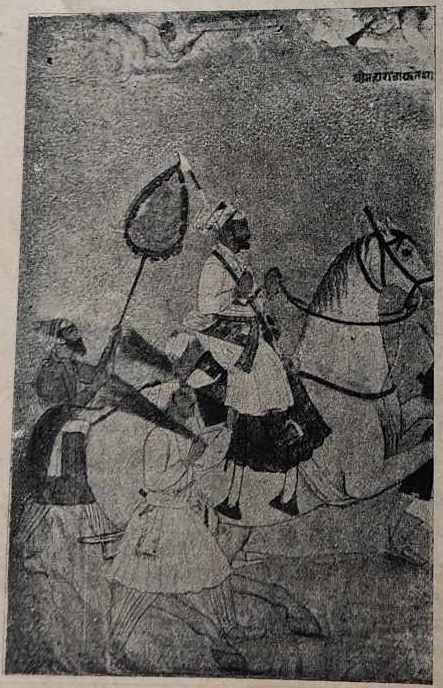
- Equestrian painting of Raja Fateh Shah of Garhwal State, by Mangat Ram, Garhwal, ca.1700

Raja of Garhwal
- Reign: 1660–1708
- Predecessor: Medini Shah
- Successor: Upendra Shah
- House: Panwar dynasty
- Father: medani shah
- Religion: Hinduism
- Military career
- Rank: Raja
- Conflicts: Battle of Bhangani; Shahranpur siege; Daba fort siege; Kumaon-Garhwal conflict

Fateh Shah was the Hindu Rajput king of Garhwal, a small kingdom in North India, from 1684 to 1716. In 1675, he was ordered by Mughal emperor Aurangzeb to bestow land for Ram Rai's dera, which came to be Dehradun.

== Campaigns ==
H. G. Walton states that Fateh Shah led an attack from Dehradun on Saharanpur in 1692. Pundirs and Gurjars were expelled out of Dehradun and areas of Saharanpur. According to research by G.R.C. Williams, Fateh Shah established a township called Fateh Pur in Haraura Pargana of Saharanpur.

According to Rahul Sankrityayan and Fateh Prakash, Raja Fateh Shah also invaded Tibet, where his sword and armour were preserved in the monastery at Daba for a long time. The ruler of Daba (Area of Tibet) refused to pay its taxes to the Fateh Shah so he again conquered Daba. Some areas of Tibet accepted dominance of Panwar kings of Uttarakhand.

=== Battle of Bhangani ===
Dabral and Bhakt Darshan believe that Fateh Shah invaded Sirmur in 1692. Ajay Singh Rawat writes that the year of invasion mentioned by these writers is not correct, and the animosity between Fateh Shah and Raja of Sirmur is the prelude to the Battle of Bhangani (1688). Mat Prakash (or Medni Prakash), the Raja of Sirmur sought the help of Guru Gobind Singh to reconcile his differences with Fateh Shah. The Guru persuaded Fateh Shah to restore good relations with the Raja of Sirmur and to return the seized portion of the Sirmur kingdom.

In 1688, the marriage of Fateh Shah's daughter was arranged with the son of Raja Bhim Chand of Bilaspur (Kahlur). Guru Gobind Singh had sent jewellery worth one lakh rupees to Fateh Shah's daughter at the time of marriage ceremony. However, Bhim Chand had grown wary of the rising influence of Guru Gobind Singh, and had developed animosity toward the Guru. He threatened to cancel the marriage if Fateh Shah accepted the gift from the Guru. Later, the combined forces of Bhim Chand and Fateh Shah launched an attack on Guru Gobind Singh's camp. Guru Gobind Singh was already prepared for a battle, and the two forces met at Bhangani, located about six miles from Paonta, on 18 September 1688.

Dr. Fauja Singh believes that the Battle of Bhangani should not be connected with the story of Fateh Shah's refusal of the wedding presents sent by the Guru. The author of Bichitra Natak doesn't mention the name of Raja Bhim Chand, and states that Fateh Shah fought with him for no obvious reasons. According to Ajay Singh Rawat, one of the possible grievances of Fateh Shah could have been the presence of Guru's armed camp near his territory; Paonta was a strategic location on the only convenient route connecting Nahan (capital of Sirmur) and Garhwal. He also believes that it is likely that the subjects of Garhwal suffered from "lawless activities" of some of the Guru's followers. These reasons could have led him to ally with Bhim Chand to attack the Guru.

According to the author of Bichitra Natak, and majority of historians, the battle resulted in the victory of the author's (i.e. the Guru's) forces, and the enemy forces fled from the battlefield. However, authors such as Pandit Harikrishna Raturi, Anil Chandra Banerjee and A. S. Rawat believe that the battle ended without any consequences, since the Guru's victory is not substantiated by any territorial annexations, and the Guru entered into an understanding with Bhim Chand soon after the battle. Although, there is practically no evidence about the territorial ambitions of the Guru.

=== Battles with Kumaon ===
Fateh Shah also fought several battles against Kumaon, without any conclusive results.

Gyan Chand of Kumaon, who ascended the throne in 1698, raided Pindar valley in Garhwal after he was crowned. In 1699, he crossed Ramganga river and plundered Sabli, Khatli, and Sainchar. Fateh Shah replied by invading Chaukot and Giwar areas of Kumaon in 1701. In 1703, the Kumaonis defeated the Garhwalis in the battle of Duduli (near Melchauri in Garhwal). In 1707, the Kumaon forces annexed Juniyagarh in Bichla Chaukot, and razed the old fort at Chandpur.

Raja Jagat Chand of Kumaon plundered Lohba and garrisoned the fort of Lohbagarh. Next year, he proceeded as far as Srinagar in Garhwal. According to H. G. Walton, Raja of Kumaon occupied Srinagar, and Fateh Shah fled to Dehradun. Fateh Shah appears to have returned very soon to Garhwal; in 1710, he mobilized his troops in Badhan. After this, he conquered the areas of Katyur Valley (modern day Baijnath) and donated a village named Garsaar to the Badrinath temple.

== Patronage of art and literature ==
The contemporary writings mention Garhwal as a very prosperous state during Fateh Shah's reign. Fateh shah was a great patron of art and literature. Like Vikramaditya and Akbar, he is said to have nine illustrious figures (Navaratnas) in his court: Sureshanand Barthwal, Revatram Dhasmana, Rudridutt Kimothi, Hari Dutt Nautiyal, Vasvanand Bahuguna, Shashidhar Dangwal, Sahdev Chandola, Kirit Ram Khanthola, and Hari Dutt Thapliyal.

Some of the encomiastic works from Ratan Shah's period include:

- Fateh Shah Karna Granth by Jatadhar (or Jatashankar)
- Fateh Prakash by Ratan Kavi (or Kshem Ram)
- Vrit Vichar by Kavi Raj Sukhdev Misra
- Vrit Kaumudi or Chhandsar Pingal by Mati Ram

Ratan Kavi's eulogies state that there was perfect law and order in Garhwal during Fateh Shah's reign, and people did not lock their houses as a result. Kavi Raj Sukhdev Misra praises the Raja's gallantry. Mati Ram's Vrit Kaumudi compares the Raja's generosity with that of the Maratha king Shivaji. Ananda Coomaraswamy mentions that two painters from the Mughal court, Shyam Dass and Har Dass, accompanied Suleiman Shikoh to Garhwal; it is possible that these painters got patronage during the reign of Fateh Shah, which resulted in the birth of the Garhwali school of painting.

== Family ==
Fateh Shah had five children:

- Upendra Shah (became the Raja after his father's death)
- Dalip Shah
- Madhukar Shah
- Pahar Shah
- A daughter who married Rajkumar (later Raja) Ajmer Chand, the son of Raja Bhim Chand of Bilaspur (Kahlur).
