= Sikh literature =

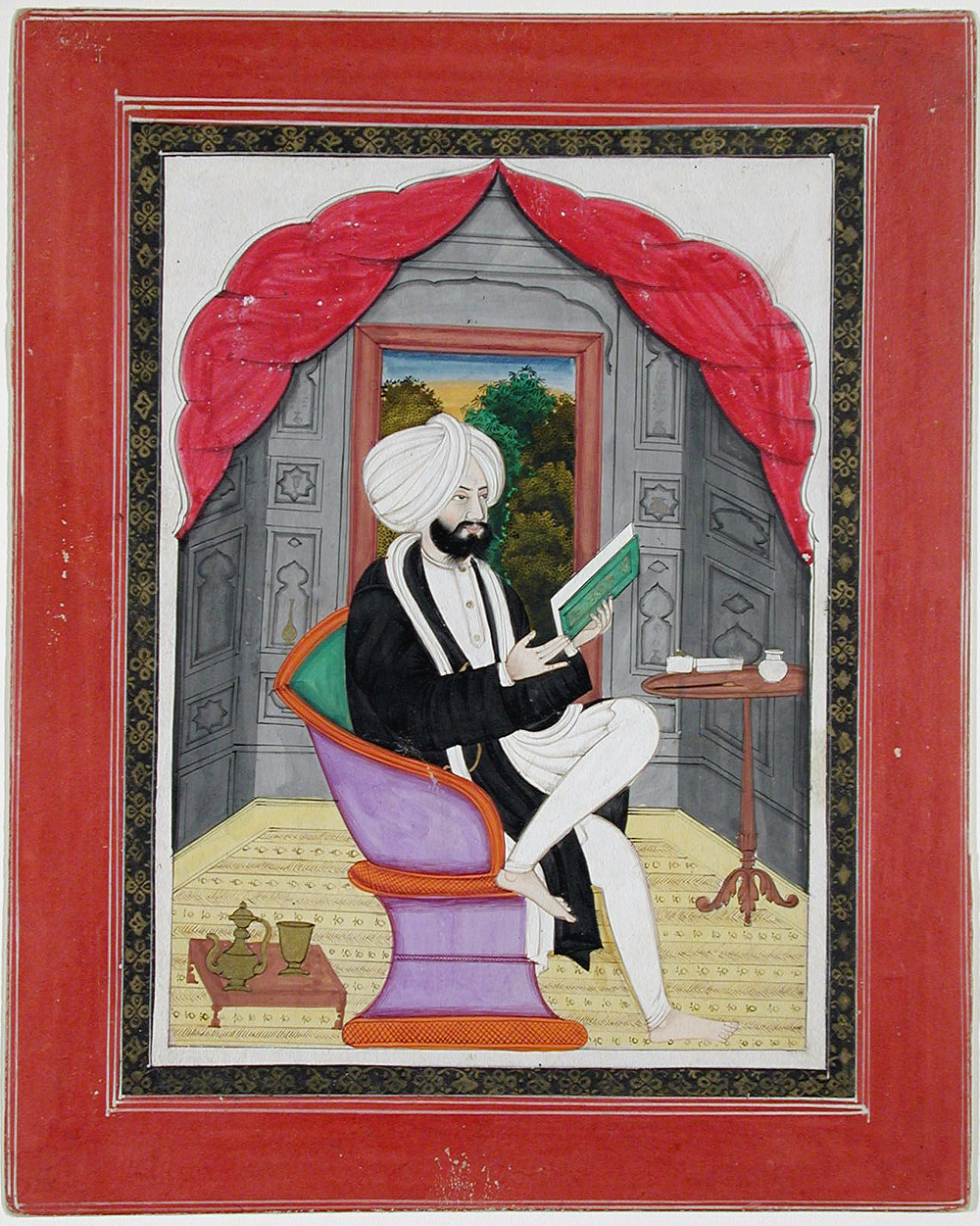
A Sikh Sardar reading from a book, seated in front of a window, ca.1870

Sikh literature refers to the writings of the Sikhs. Traditional Sikh literature can be classified into various genres, such as the Vār, Sākhī, Rahitnāmā, the Gurbilās, the Shahīd Bilās, and the Ustat forms. Sikh literature is more comparable to the literary traditions of other religions of the subcontinent, rather than being analogous to Punjabi literature, which is a regional-language literary tradition. Although usually employing Gurmukhi script, the corpus of Sikh texts utilize various languages aside from Punjabi proper, namely belonging to New Indo-Aryan, such as Saraiki, Khariboli, and Braj. Thus, the situation for Sikh literature is comparable to the literary tradition of the subcontinental Ismailis. According to Norman Gerald Barrier, the Sikhs of Punjab had the strongest sense of history out of the religious communities of Northern India and their literature covers the Sikh gurus, warriors, the Sikh Empire, and the colonial period.

== History ==
The Sikhs (and the Dadupanthis) were one of the earliest Bhakti movement affiliated religious traditions that underwent the scripturalization process by organizing their literature into written canons, leading to the completion of the Ād Granth in 1604. During the Kartarpur chapter of Guru Nanak's life, his compositions were seen as a source of wisdom and compiled in the form of a book, known as a pothī. This collection would later be passed onto Nanak's successor Guru Angad, with him and the later gurus expanding upon the Sikh scriptural corpus by adding their own works and that of others in-line with Sikh theology. The major expansions on the Sikh religious collection occurred in around 1570, 1604, 1675, and the 1690's, finally assuming a canonical format. Other early Sikh literary works during the period of the Sikh gurus include the Vaars of Bhai Gurdas, the Hukamnamas issued to sangats, and the Bhatt Vahis.

Under the Sikhs, early Punjabi prose literature evolved with the janamsakhi, sakhi, parchai, and goshti genres. During the guruship of Guru Gobind Singh, his Kavi Darbars produced literature, although most of these works were lost during the evacuation of Anandpur in 1704, being lost in the Sirsa river as per some accounts. One of these lost works was the large Vidya Sagar Granth. Historically, Sikh works were composed in languages and scripts other than Punjabi and Gurmukhi, such as Braj and Persian, although today Sikh literature is mostly produced in Punjabi in Gurmukhi. Older Sikh works were often written in a form of scriptio continua Gurmukhi known as larivaar, although nowadays all works are written with spacing, known as pad chedd. Hagiographical Sikh literature developed further under Sikh-rule with the sakhi, mahima, gurbilas, and panth prakash genres. However, these historical Sikh sources are semi-historical and generally reverential, being written by poets rather than historians, focusing more on theological aspects rather than objective history, with the authors sometimes not being contemporary to the events they write about and relying upon oral traditions.

In the second half of the 19th century, a number of printed editions were published of the Guru Granth Sahib (including excerpt portions of major sections, including Panj Granthis or prominent prayers such as the Japji Sahib, Anand Sahib, Rahiras Sahib, or Ada di Vaar), Janamsakhis, and Gurbilases. During the colonial period between c. 1870–1914, Sikh publishers printed qissas, a genre initially developed my earlier Muslim Sufi poets. The Akali movement and expulsion of Udasi mahants from gurdwaras led to the destruction of some Udasi-related manuscripts and works.

== Language ==
The earliest Sikh works are from Guru Nanak to Guru Arjan, primarily composed in the sacred language of the Sikhs (Sant Bhasha). After the period of Guru Arjan, Sikh literature became more influenced by Persian and Braj, with Guru Gobind Singh being proficient in both. In the 18th and early 19th centuries, much Sikh literature was composed in Braj and Persian rather than Punjabi, albeit being written in Gurmukhi script. The Udasis favoured Sadh Bhakha while the Nirmalas utilized Sanskrit. During the Singh Sabha movements from the 1870s–90s, Punjabi in Gurmukhi script became popularized and promoted by Sikh reformers and authors. Various socio-religious movements of the 20th century led to the development of a Modern Standard Punjabi, initially being influenced by the Punjabi dialects Majhi and Lahnda but later Malwai and Doabi, being increasingly Sanskritized.
