= Bhai (Sikhism) =

Sikh title

Bhai is a Sikh title and religious tradition, as a title it is conferred upon Sikh males who are religiously pious and educated. The word bhai literally means "brother" but in Sikhism it is used as an epithet or honourific for holy men. It is also used to evoke a familial sense and as a title of affection between equals. Other common titles held by such persons was baba or rarely guru. Guru as a title was usually held by Sikh guru-descendants or the Nirmalas. Where as the guru descendants in the 18th and 19th centuries had inherited holiness, the bhais had acquired it during their lives. To qualify as a bhai, a person needed to be able to interpret and explain the Guru Granth Sahib, such as by being a granthi, and be publicly recognized as pious. Further qualifying abilities include miracle-working, healing, and being able to provide reassurances. It was believed that a blessing from a bhai could improve one's life and fend off harmful elements. They played a key role in the propagation of Sikhism in the historical period. Some bhais were born into lineages associated with the role (the Bhais of Bagrian) while others were from non-bhai backgrounds and rose to the title through their own merit, such as Maharaj Singh. Two hereditary bhai lineages were that of Vasti Ram and another of Bagrian.

== Etymology ==
The word bhāī is an Indo-Aryan word, the related Sanskrit word is bhrātṛ while the Pali word is bhāyā.

== Usage ==
There are at-least four uses for the term:

- as a title of reverence conferred upon Sikh males who are religiously devout and learnt
- as a term applied to a Sikh teacher
- as a term to describe a Sikh musician (ragi)
- in its popular usage as a term of affection to display friendship

The honourific bhai can also be combined with the honourific sahib, as bhai sahib to describe highly learnt or respected persons but in modern times is used much more frequently and loosely. When used by women, bhai sahib carries a temporary brotherly kinship meaning.

== History ==
The word bhai features within the Guru Granth Sahib as a title of affection rather than to denote a specific role or rank. By the mid-17th century, the word came to describe a distinct title. The first recorded use is in the Bhai Bala tradition of Janamsakhis (1658), which uses the word to describe Bhai Bala. W. H. McLeod theorizes that the term's honourifical connotation originated earlier than this and Mardana and Gurdas may have been given the bhai title by their contemporaries (perhaps by Nanak in the case of Mardana) but not in a manner to distinguish them from other Sikhs. As per McLeod, the originally egaliterian term developed to refer to a distinguished type of Sikh leader during the period of the later Sikh gurus and in the 18th century to describe devout Sikhs and sangat (congregation) leaders. Its use was prevalent amongst the sehajdharis. Harjot Oberoi connects the bhai tradition to the Sanatan Sikhs, a pluralistic and polycentric form of the religion responsible for spreading Sikhism amongst peasant masses via leaders and masters.

The earliest bhais in the Sikh tradition during the period of the human Sikh gurus were Bhai Buddha (where the tradition likely originated as per Harjot Oberoi), Bhai Gurdas, Bhai Nand Lal, and Bhai Mani Singh. The term was also used to describe the first five Panj Piare. During the 18th century, the term gradually was replaced with the sardar honourific. Later bhais were prominent during the 18th and 19th centuries during Sikh-rule. They especially played a prominent role during the reign of Maharaja Ranjit Singh of the Sikh Empire, who had a number of bhais in his court as officials. A prominent bhai lineage were the Bhais of Bagrian, who were of Tarkhan origin. Their ancestor had been bestowed the bhai title by Guru Hargobind and the family would play a prevalent role in the promulgation of Sikhism in the Malwa region, being patronized by the Phulkian states.

In the 19th century, the term came to be used to describe a teacher of a Gurmukhi school. The indigenous education system, as noted by G. W. Leitner in 1882, consisted of the following progression: If a student wanted to progress from studentship to fellowship (becoming a bhai), it was compulsory for them to study the Guru Granth Sahib, the Dasam Granth, Gurmukhi grammar, Pingal (Gurmukhi prosody), Itihas (history), arithematic, and Sanskrit elements. To progress further, education was required in the Gurmukhi adaptations and translations of Niaya, Vedanta, and Pratigant. The highest level in the education system was that of a Giani or I'rfan, who could explain theology and philosophy in the local vernacular as a preacher to the masses.

The usage of the title bhai was revived under the Nirankari, Namdhari, and Singh Sabha movements, such as by Jodh Singh. The term later became associated with Sikh communists. Since the mid-1980's, the term is actively used by Sikh youth activists and as a political signifier, describing persons such as Bhai Amrik Singh, former president of the Sikh Students' Federation.

In the modern period, the term has two different uses, one very narrow (as an honourific, becoming increasingly rarer) and the other quite general (as a vocational title, quite commonly used). The first meaning describes a select few group of Sikhs to enhance their status as an honourific for those Sikhs who have made large contributions to the community and are noted for their piety and religious knowledge, barring those in administrative roles. The process of becoming a bhai in this case is one of public opinion through repeated practice of appending bhai to the names of such persons and not of a conscious decision or formal ceremony of investiture. The second meaning is much more varied and widespread, with bhai being used to describe a manager, musician, or educator of any gurdwara. It has also developed as a term to refer to a ragi, where it no longer has any reverential meaning and may even be used in a pejorative sense.

== Literature ==
The most famous writer of the tradition was Bhai Gurdas, who wrote the Varan, consisting of 39 vaars that expound on the Guru Granth Sahib. It is also possible that Baba Buddha may have authored works but none surviving are known.

== List of bhais ==
- Bhai Bala
- Bhai Mardana
- Bhai Lalo
- Baba Buddha
- Bhai Bhagatu
- Bhai Gurdas
- Bhai Bidhi Chhand
- Bhai Nand Lal
- The five bhais of the first Panj Piare quintet:
  - Bhai Daya Singh
  - Bhai Dharam Singh
  - Bhai Himmat Singh
  - Bhai Mohkam Singh
  - Bhai Sahib Singh
- Bhai Mani Singh
- Bhai Vasti Ram
- Bhai Sant Singh
- Bhai Ram Singh
- Bhai Gobind Ram
- Bhai Bir Singh
- Bhai Maharaj Singh
- Bhai Jodh Singh
- Bhai Vir Singh
- Bhai Kahn Singh
- Bhai Randhir Singh
- Bhai Ram Lal Rahi
- Bhai Harbans Lal
- Bhai Amrik Singh
