= Kavi Darbar =

17th and 18th-century Sikh court of poets

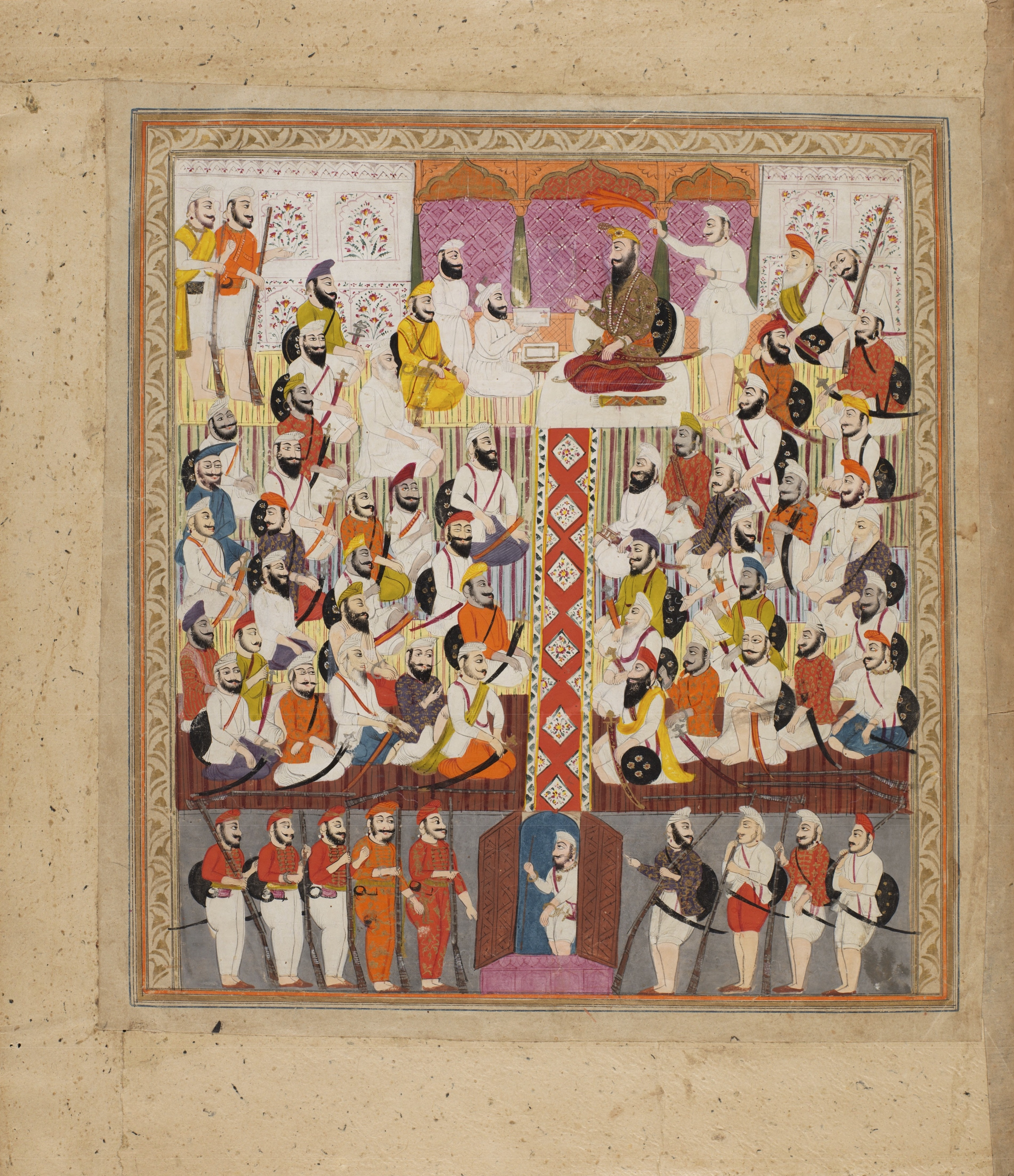
Painting of the court of Guru Gobind Singh. Illustration from a manuscript of Krishnavatar.

Kavi Darbar (literally "poet court") is a term that refers to historical Sikh durbars (courts) composed of congregations of poets, litterateurs, artists, and scholars that were established and had flourished during the guruship period of Guru Gobind Singh in the late 17th and early 18th centuries. (Note: The term "Kavi Darbar" is alternatively spelt as 'Kavi Durbar'.) These establishments served as Sikh centres of learning and scholarship. They played a pivotal role in the history of Sikh literature.

== History ==
According to popular Sikh tradition, Guru Gobind Singh established a court of poets consisting of fifty-two members, known as Bavanja Kavi (literally "fifty-two poets"). According to Kahn Singh Nabha's Mahankosh, the names of the fifty-two poets are as follows:

- Uday Rai
- Ani Rai
- Amrit Rai
- Allu
- Asa Singh
- Alim
- Ishavar Dass
- Sukh Dev
- Sukha Singh
- Sukhia
- Sudama
- Sainapat
- Shyam
- Heer
- Hussain Ali
- Hans Ram
- Kallu
- Kuveresh
- Khan Chand
- Gunia
- Gurdas
- Gopal
- Chandan
- Chanda
- Jamaal
- Tehkin
- Dharam Singh
- Dhanna Singh
- Dhayan Singh
- Nannoo
- Nishchal Dass
- Nihal Chand
- Nand Singh
- Nand Lal
- Pindi Dass
- Ballabh
- Balloo
- Bidhi Chand
- Bulland
- Brikh
- Brij Lal
- Mathura
- Madan Singh
- Madan Giri
- Malloo
- Maan Dass
- Mala Singh
- Mangal
- Ram
- Rawal
- Roshan Singh
- Lakha

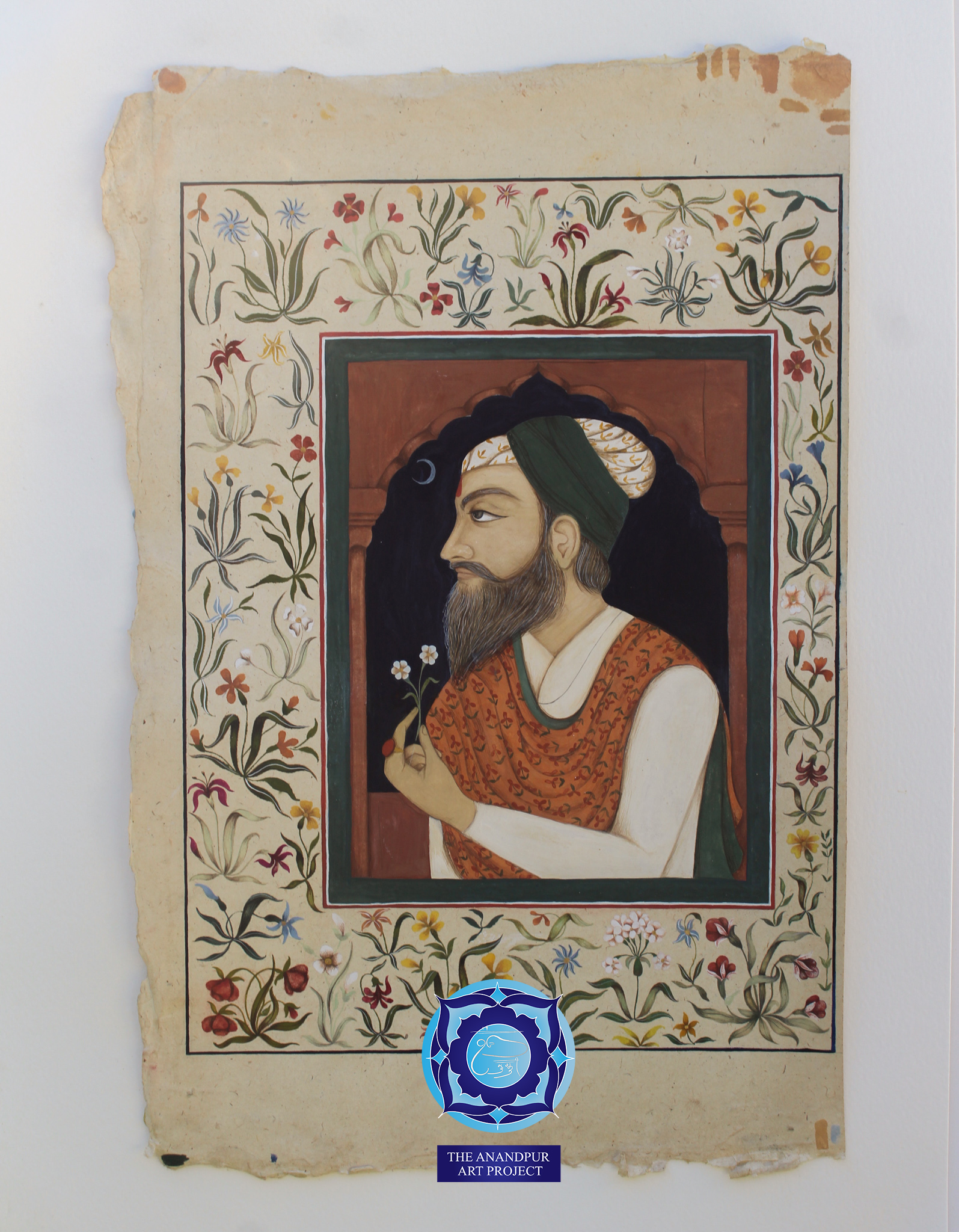
Modern painting of Kavi Kuvresh by the Anandpur Art Project

The three most prominent and famous of the fifty-poets were Bhai Nand Lal Goya, Kavi Chandra Sain Sainapati, and Bhai Gurdas Singh. (Note: Bhai Gurdas Singh is not to be confused with Bhai Gurdas Bhalla.) After analyzing the surviving pieces of literature produced by the Kavi Darbars, Sikhologists Louis E. Fenech and W. H. McLeod propose the number of poets in the darbars established by the tenth Sikh guru would have been considerably greater than the traditional narrative of there only being fifty-two. They further state the number 52 came into popular parlance and tradition due to its auspicious associations in Sanskrit and Devanagari, and therefore was "used in order to convey an amount of sanctity on this assembly". There was a great deal of movement of intellectuals between the various sub-imperial courts during this era. D. P. Singh, on the other hand, states the 52 poets were the ones who were permanently employed in the Kavi Darbar.

Guru Gobind Singh accorded the Braj language as the "principal literary language of his court" (with Persian also being gifted a similar status) for the effect of challenging the Mughal court's status, fame, and reputation. The number of intellectuals working, engaged, and associating with and in the Sikh Darbar assemblies changed over time. The popular narrative of the Kavi Darbars claims the poets all wrote in Braj, with the exception of two who wrote in Persian instead. Guru Gobind Singh may have established the Kavi Darbar assemblies due to the influence of Mughal (and to a lesser extent, Pahari Raja) courtly norms and functions. The Sikh Kavi Darbars were distinguishable from their Mughal and Pahari counterparts in a few ways, with the most noteworthy being the nature of manuscript-making and music at the Sikh assemblies. The authors of the Sikh Kavi Darbars produced literature typically about popular subjects of the era using fancy language, emulating their contemporaries found within other poetical courts of the subcontinent at the time. Common topics covered by the writings of the Kavis were ritigranths (style manuscripts) and Braj interpretations of the Mahabharata epic but also other Indic texts.

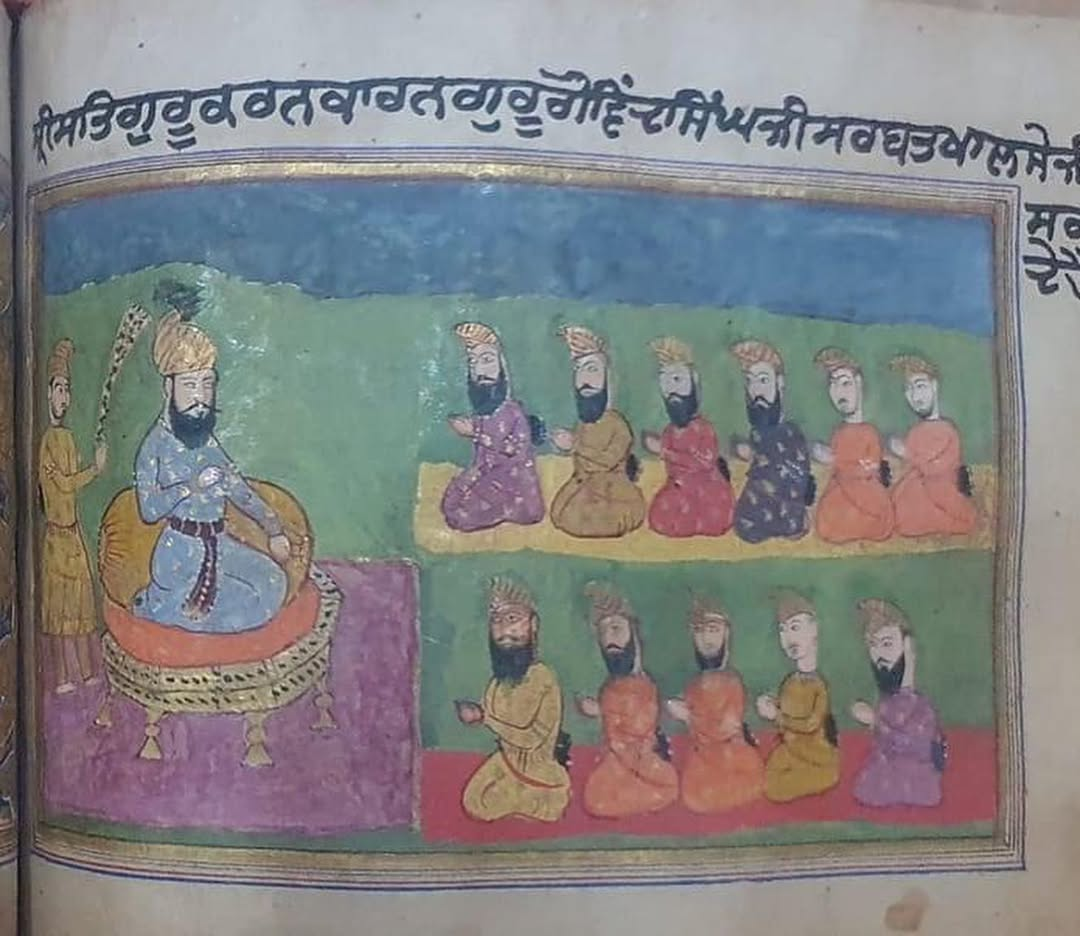
Painting of Guru Gobind Singh holding court, from a Gobind Gita manuscript, circa early 19th century

According to Roopinder Singh, when the guruship passed from Guru Tegh Bahadur to Guru Gobind Singh, the latter inherited his father's courtly poets. The poets produced literature in a variety of languages, some examples being Braj, Sanskrit, Persian, Arabic, and Punjabi. According to Kavi Santokh Singh in the Suraj Prakash, the total weight of the literature produced by the Anandpur Darbar assembly weighed a total of 350 kilograms. However, all of this literature, aside from a tiny surviving portion of material transferred out of the area earlier, was lost when the Khalsa evacuated Anandpur in 1704 or December 1705 due to aggression from hostile forces. The literature produced by the Anandpur Kavi Darbar was lost in the ensuing action of the Sikhs crossing the Sirsa Rivulet, splitting up from each other in confusion, and being attacked by Mughal forces, including at Chamkaur Sahib. According to D. P. Singh and Khushwant Singh, it is said around fourteen maunds (approximately 498 kilograms) worth of literature produced by the Sikh Kavi Darbars was lost during the Sirsa Rivulet crossing. (Note: A maund is a traditional Indic unit of weight measurement. One maund is equivalent to around 35.55 kilograms.)

== Paonta Darbar ==
The Paonta Darbar was based in Paonta Sahib. It was established after Raja Medini Prakash of Nahan invited Guru Gobind Singh to settle in his domain in April 1685. The Guru built a fort in the area of Paonta and would establish a poetic court as a result. As per the Guru Kian Sakhian, fifty-two poets arrived at Paonta, with a literary darbar being held everyday at Paonta. Some notable poets included Amrit Rai of Lahore, Tehkan of Gujrat, Ani Rai, and Alam.

== Anandpur Darbar ==
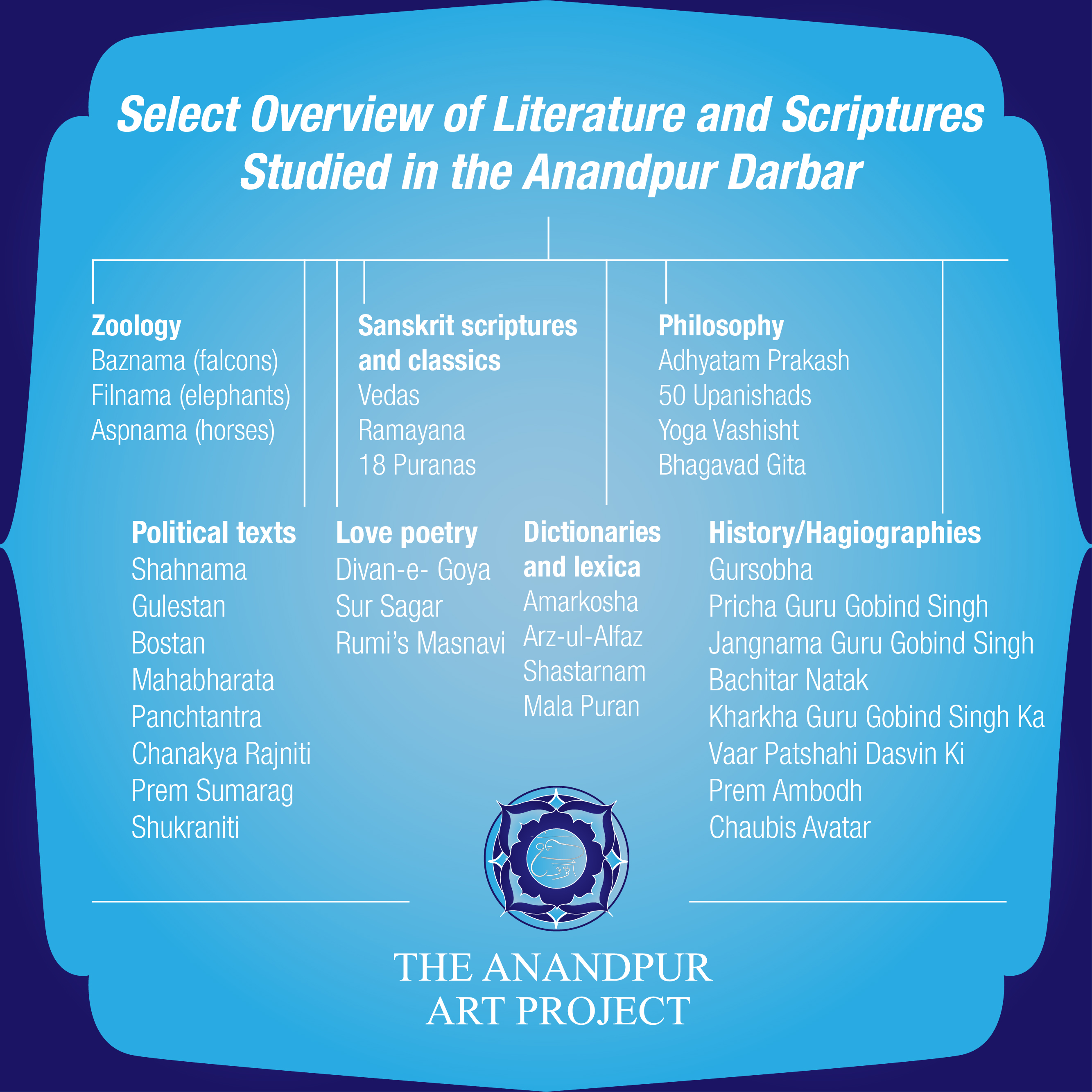
A selection of literature produced by the Anandpur Darbar

The Anandpur Darbar was based in Anandpur Sahib. The names of the poets active at the Anandpur Darbar were Amrit Rai, Ani Rai, Siam, Sainapati, Alam, Tahikan, Daya Singh, Sukha Singh, and Dharam Singh. They were tasked with translating ancient Sanskrit treatises into Braj, Sadh Bhakha, and Punjabi.

It is at the Anandpur Kavi Darbar that the voluminous and massive Vidya Sagar Granth literary corpus and tome was commissioned and prepared. The literary corpus is said to have contained the compositions of the tenth Sikh guru, various poets, and scholars. According to popular Sikh tradition, the tome weighed nine maunds (approx. 320 kilograms) when it was finished. However, the tome was lost whilst the Sikhs were crossing the Sirsa Rivulet in 1705 during the evacuation of Anandpur. Surviving portions of the tome may have been recovered or been sourced to copies made by devotees when the tome was extant. The tome likely mostly consisted of translations of ancient Sanskrit works into Braj, Punjabi, and Sadh Bhakha.

== Lakhi Jungle Darbar ==
The Lakhi Jungle Darbar was based in the Lakhi Jungle tract. After the evacuation of Anandpur, the Guru held a poetic court within Lakhi Jungle. According to Piara Singh Padam, it was attended by Behari, Lal Das Khiali, Adha, Jado Rai, Fat Mal, Keso, and Bhagtu.

== List of literature produced ==
- Das Gur Katha, authored by Kavi Kankan, a versified account of the ten human Sikh gurus.
- Ganj-namah ("treasure book"), authored by Bhai Nand Lal Goya, a versified account of the ten Sikh gurus with particular focus placed on Guru Gobind Singh.
- Pingal Sar, authored by Kavi Giridhar Lal, text on Hindi prosody.
- Drona Parva, authored by Kavi Kunvaresh, interpretation of the Mahabharata's portion on Dronacharya.
- Braj interpretation of the Shalya Parva of the Mahabharata, authored by Kavi Mangal Rai.
- Prem Abodh ("love indiscriminate"), authored by Kavi Hari Das, a text which recounts the lives of sixteen prominent Bhakti saints, including Mirabai.
- Rajniti Granth ("book of politics"), authored by Kavi Tansukh Lahauri, Braj interpretation of the Hitopadesha.
- Braj interpretation of a Parva (section) of the Mahabharata by Kavi Amrit Rai.
- Vidya Sagar Granth ("book of the ocean of wisdom"), a massive tome produced as a joint effort by the Kavis. (Note: Alternatively spelt as 'Vidia Sagar Granth'. Also known simply as the "Sagar Granth". Another name for the tome is "Samund Sagar Granth".)
