= Bhai Gurdas Singh =

Sikh saint

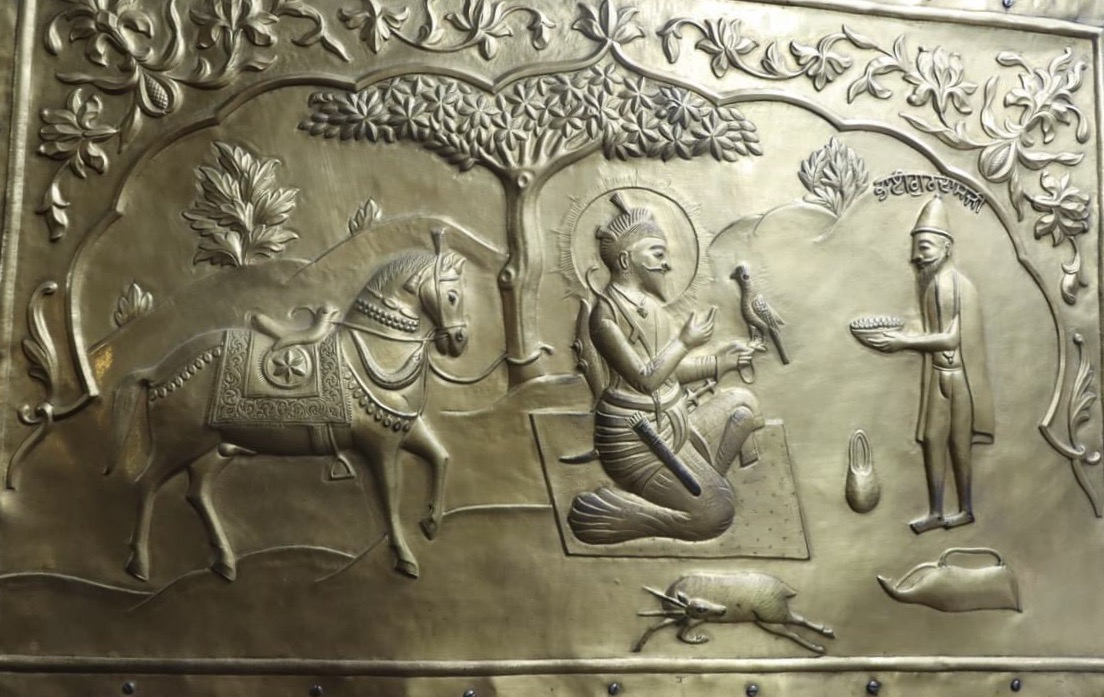
- Repoussé plaque (gilded panel) depicting Bhai Gurdas Singh (standing at right) presenting himself before Guru Gobind Singh (seated in centre) with an offering, from the Khatwari Dharamsal in Shikarpur, Sindh

Personal life
- Relations: Alam Singh Nachna (brother)

Religious life
- Religion: Sikhism

Bhai Gurdas Singh (fl. 18th century), also known as Bhai Gurdas II, was a Sikh during the time of Guru Gobind Singh. He is most known for writing a Vaar (folk ballad). He was one of the traditionally-ascribed 52 poets of the Kavi Darbar of Guru Gobind Singh, being one of the three most renowned and famous of the group.

== Biography ==
He was the brother of Alam Singh Nachna. He served as one of the many poets in the durbar (court) of Guru Gobind Singh. According to Louis E. Fenech and W. H. McLeod, he was a Sindhi poet who lived in the early part of the 18th century.

In praise of Guru Gobind Singh, he exclaimed in his writing:

"Lo, a man is born amongst men,
Chivalrous, Unfathomable, Singular and Unique"

— Bhai Gurdas Singh, translated by Devinder Pal Singh

=== Vaar ===
He was an eyewitness to the Vaisakhi event which occurred in Anandpur on 13 April 1699, when the Guru formalized the Khalsa order. He later recounted his account of that day in a Vaar, named the Vaar Sri Bhagaut Ji Ki Patshahi Dasvin Ki, amidst hostilities from Hindus and Muslims alike. In a manuscript of the Vaar kept in the collection of the Sikh Reference Library, the work is known under the titled Vaar Bhai Gurdas Ji Ki. The entire work comprises twenty-eight pauris (Indic term for stanzas), with twenty of the pauris praising Guru Gobind Singh and singling out unique aspects of the tenth guru. A common theme emphasized throughout the work is how Guru Gobind Singh transformed the sangat (congregation) of Sikhs into the Khalsa. The comparison is made to the Guru's sword and Kalika, the Indic deity. Reference is made to the predecessor gurus Har Rai, Har Krishan (both on pauri 22) and Tegh Bahadur (pauri 23), with the last containing an account of the Guru's martyrdom in Delhi. The finishing stanzas eulogize the Khalsa. The work was composed in "Hindized Punjabi".

In his Vaar, he states:

The Guru has remembered upon the Kalka and prepare the Amrit of Khanda. Drinking which, this life becomes of fruition.

— Bhai Gurdas Singh, Vaar 41 (Pauri 1, lines 3–4)

In his Vaar, he furthermore stresses the importance of the remembrance and chanting of Akāl (Gurmukhi: ਅਕਾਲ, romanized: Akāla, lit. 'without time', fig. 'immortal') for Sikhs:

Everyone automatically speaks of Guru Gobind Singh Ji who has made them to chant Akaal, Akaal.

— Vaar 41 (Pauri 17, line 10)

This work is commonly appended at the end of Varan Bhai Gurdas as a 41st Vaar on-top of the traditional forty authored by Gurdas Bhalla.

According to Louis E. Fenech and Vir Singh, the 41st Vaar would have been written in the mid-1780s as per internal evidence.

=== Later life ===
After the death of his master, Guru Gobind Singh, in 1708, it is said Gurdas Singh traveled to Sindh, where he did missionary work spreading the tenets of Sikhism in the local area of Shikarpur. Traditional lore claims he lived to an impressive age of 150. His life is commemorated in the Khatwari Dharamsal of Bhai Gurdas in Shikarpur, Sindh.

== Literary works ==
- Vaar Sri Bhagaut Ji Ki Patshahi Dasvin Ki – Vaar on the Amrit Sanchar and Guru Gobind Singh
- Raag Ramkali Ki Vaar
- Barahmaha Sri Ram Chandar – narration of the separation between Rama and his brother, Bharata, whom were saddened by their uncoupling. Written shortly after the death of Guru Gobind Singh in 1708 to recount how the Sikhs of the time were feeling being separated from their Guru.
- Pryaye Sri Guru Granth Sahib Ji – poetic expounding of the Guru Granth Sahib
