= Vidya Sagar Granth =

Lost 17th-century Sikh text

The Vidya Sagar Granth ("book of the ocean of wisdom"), also known as the Samund Sagar Granth, was a voluminous literary work produced by the Kavi Darbar of Guru Gobind Singh in the late 17th century, combining all the compositions by the court-poets into a single volume. (Note: Alternatively spelt as 'Vidia Sagar Granth'. Also known simply as the "Sagar Granth". Another name for the tome is "Samund Sagar Granth".) According to popular Sikh tradition, the entire work was lost during the crossing of the Sarsa river in 1704 or 1705.

== History ==
It is at the Anandpur Kavi Darbar that the voluminous and massive Vidya Sagar Granth literary corpus and tome was commissioned and prepared. The literary corpus is said to have contained the compositions of the tenth Sikh guru, various poets, and scholars. It was Amrit Rai, Ani Rai, Siam, Sainapati, Alam, Tahikan, Daya Singh, Sukha Singh, and Dharam Singh who had the responsibility of translating ancient Sanskrit treatises into Braj, Sādh Bhākhā, and Punjabi. The tome likely mostly consisted of translations of ancient Sanskrit works into Braj, Punjabi, and Sadh Bhakha. According to popular Sikh tradition, the tome weighed nine maunds (approx. 320 kilograms) when it was finished. However, the tome was lost whilst the Sikhs were crossing the Sirsa Rivulet in 1705 during the evacuation of Anandpur. Surviving portions of the tome may have been recovered or been sourced to copies made by devotees when the tome was extant.

References to the tome are found in Chaupa Singh Rahit-Nama, Mahima Prakash Kavita, Bansavilinama, and the Suraj Prakash. Whilst the Bansavilinama posits that the work had been lost while crossing the Sirsa, the Suraj Prakash states it was left behind in Anandpur Sahib. According to Kesar Singh Chibber's account, the unbound tome was thrown into the Sirsa river upon the orders of Guru Gobind Singh in 1701, with some pages being recovered. Santokh Singh's account claims that when it was left behind in Anandpur, it was torn apart by Mughal soldiers. Some Sikhs quickly hurried back to recover the work but could only locate sixty-two pages, with Santokh Singh claiming to have witnessed some preserved pages at Anandpur. 19th century Patiala-ruler Maharaja Narinder Singh was able to obtain surviving Anandpuri literature from the Hill States, whose ancestors had looted them during the invasion, and also recreated some works. In his work History of Indigenous Education in the Punjab, Gottlieb William Leitner makes reference to a 4,000 page manuscript at Anandpur, which may have been a surviving portion of the Vidya Sagar Granth. Vir Singh in his Sri Kalgidar Chamatkar states that both Santokh Singh and Sumer Singh had access to surviving portions of the work, with sections surviving being preserved in pustakalya (book-depositories) in Patiala. Pyara Singh Padam also made a reference to the work:

Giani Prakram Singh from [the city of] Sangrur told me that he saw fifty to sixty pages of the Vidiya Sagar Granth at the house of Sodhi Beant Singh in Anandpur. On each page there were forty lines, and it consisted of more than a thousand pages. Even now at the Sikh Reference Library, there are some large manuscripts of more than three thousand pages scribed in 1696. Inside these manuscripts the signatures of court poets Balgobind and Fateh Chand are found. We can conclude that these books at some point in history were part of the larger Vidiya Sagar Granth.

— Pyara Singh Padam (December, 1944)

However, the general consesus on the status of the work today as per Satnam Singh is that it was lost during the invasion of Anandpur in 1704.
