= Pauri (disambiguation) =

Pauri is a town in Pauri Garhwal district, Uttarakhand, India.

Pauri may also refer to:

- Pauri (Uttarakhand Assembly constituency), electoral constituency in the state legislative assembly of Uttarakhand, India
- Pauri Garhwal district, district in Uttarakhand, India, centred on the town
  - Pauri Garhwal (Lok Sabha constituency), electoral constituency in the lower house of the Indian parliament
- Pauri (poetry), form of poetry in Punjabi
- Pauri language or Pauri Bareli language, a Bhil (Indo-Aryan) language of India
- Satu Pauri, Finnish athlete
