= Varan Bhai Gurdas =

Sikh scripture

Varan Bhai Gurdas ਵਾਰਾਂ ਭਾਈ ਗੁਰਦਾਸ
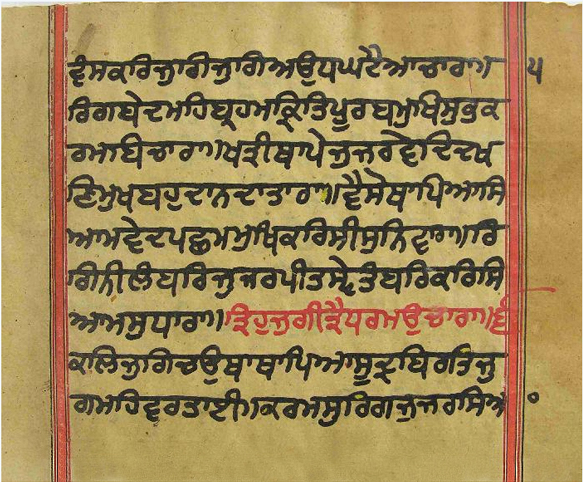
- Folio of an 18th or 19th century manuscript of Varan Bhai Gurdas

Information
- Religion: Sikhism
- Author: Bhai Gurdas
- Period: Circa early 17th century
- Chapters: 40 vaars

Varan Bhai Gurdas (Gurmukhi: ਵਾਰਾਂ ਭਾਈ ਗੁਰਦਾਸ vārāṁ bhā'ī guradāsa; meaning "ballads of Bhai Gurdas"), also known as Varan Gyan Ratnavali (Punjabi: ਵਾਰ ਗਿਆਨ ਰਤਨਾਵਲੀ, romanized: Vāra gi'āna ratanāvalī, lit. 'ballads of gems of knowledge'), is the name given to the 40 vars (a form of Punjabi poetry) which is traditionally attributed to Bhai Gurdas. They are popularly regarded as the key to the Sikh scriptures.

== History ==
=== Background ===
The first widely accepted and available extant Sikh writings were put-down to writing in the 1570's, namely being the two extant recensions (out of four originally) of the Goindwal Pothis and the Puratan Janamsakhi. Later, the MS 1245 was written in around 1600, with the Adi Granth being finished and installed in 1604 in the form of the Kartarpur Pothi. Bhai Gurdas is claimed to have been the amanuensis of the original Kartarpur Pothi, which itself would be copied multiple times in the early 17th century.

Bhai Gurdas was a first cousin of Mata Bhani, mother of Guru Arjan Dev. He was the first scribe of Guru Granth Sahib and a scholar of great repute. From his work it is clear that he had mastery of various Indian languages and had studied many ancient Indian religious scriptures. It is said that the motivation for Gurdas to write the first var was due to Guru Arjan requesting him to complete an authentic work of literature documenting and detailing the life of Guru Nanak.

Guru Arjan ordered me

To compose 40 Vars

So that peace may descend upon me.

— Bhai Gurdas Bhalla, Gurbilas Patshahi Chhevin (1718)

=== Compilation ===
Gurdas was a familial relative of some of the Sikh gurus, being the nephew of Guru Amar Das, cousin of Guru Arjan, and uncle of Guru Hargobind. Gurdas was committed to missionary work spreading the Sikh religion. Since Gurdas had grown-up in Goindwal, which was near Sultanpur Lodhi, with Sultanpur being a major mercantile and educational hub at the time, Gurdas could access educational opportunities during his upbringing. Gurdas' writings reveal he had a mastery over Punjabi and Braj and working-knowledge of Persian. Gurdas did not consult the knowledge of Baba Buddha (whom had been alive when Guru Nanak was around) when he compiled the work.

=== Dating ===
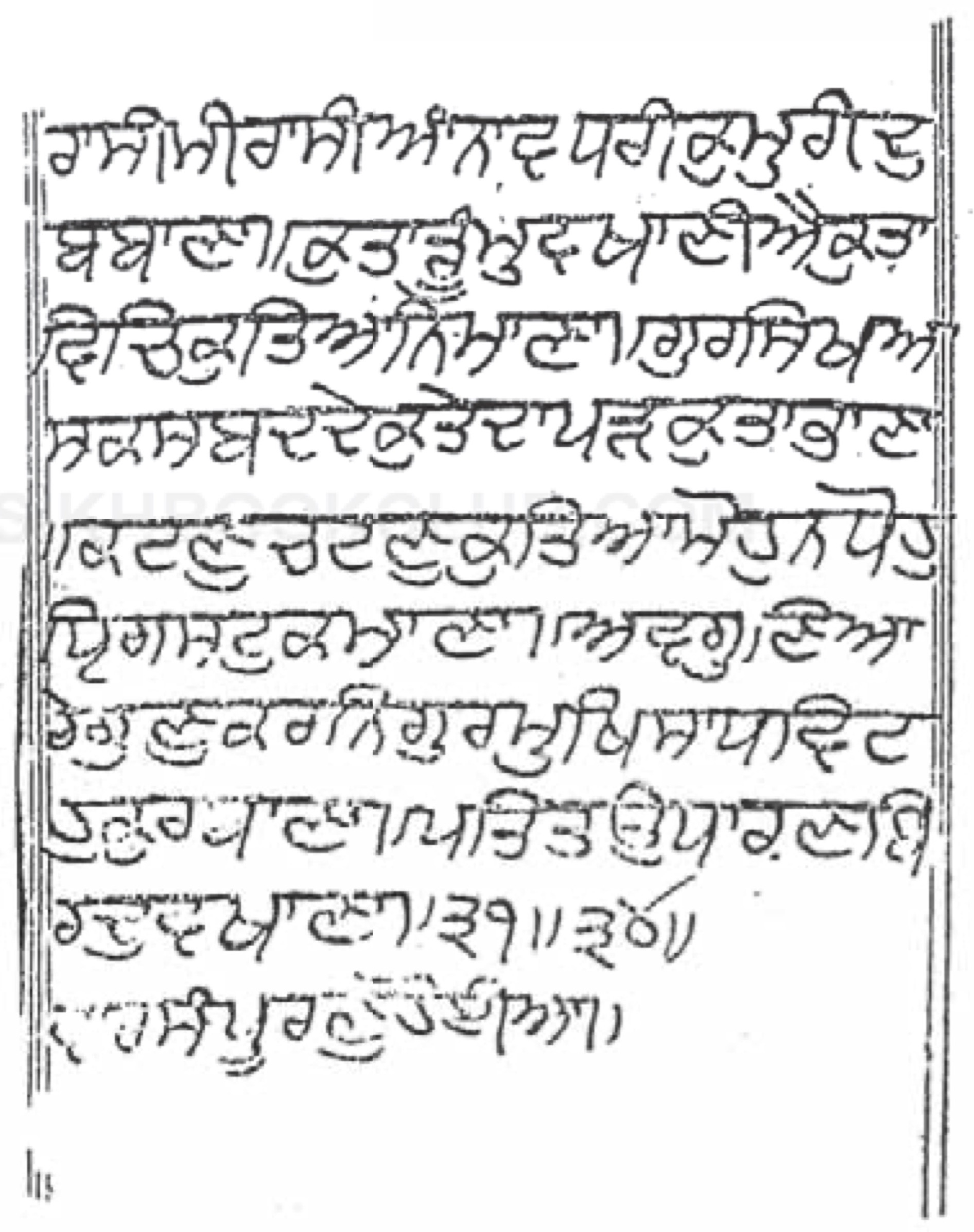
Folio of the Lamba manuscript of the Varan Bhai Gurdas. According to Rahuldeep Singh Gill (2017), the Lamba manuscript is the earliest extant manuscript of Varan Bhai Gurdas, based upon its ordering of vārs and its archaic orthography.

None of the extant early manuscripts of the work are dated nor contain colophons. Scholarship has agreed that the vārs were composed between a sixty year period between the late 16th century and around 1630. Rahuldeep Singh Gill argues that the vārs must have been written after the compilation and installment of the Adi Granth in 1604. He bases this dating on the fact that the vārs were not incorporated into the Adi Granth, that some events referenced in them took place in the early 17th century, and some of them were written partly to combat the nascent Mina sect. Based on that, Gill dates the dates of compilation for the vārs as follows:

- Vārs 4–37 were likely composed between 1606 and the mid-to-late 1610's and once stood-alone, originally preceding the other six vārs present in the established collection, with them being presented alone in the earliest manuscript.
- Vārs 1–3 and 39–40 were likely composed around 1620 in-response to the Miharvan Janamsakhi that was produced by or before 1618. Dr. Kirpal Singh dates the first Vār to the 1630s.
- Vār 38 is difficult to date reliably but it was written after vārs 4–37.

It was likely the number of vārs reached 40 as the number is auspicious in Sikhism, being the number of stanzas in the Jap and Anand hymns. As per Dalbir Singh Dhillon, Bhai Gurdas authored the work in the late 16th century. According to G. S. Mann, the work was written pre-1630.

=== Manuscripts ===
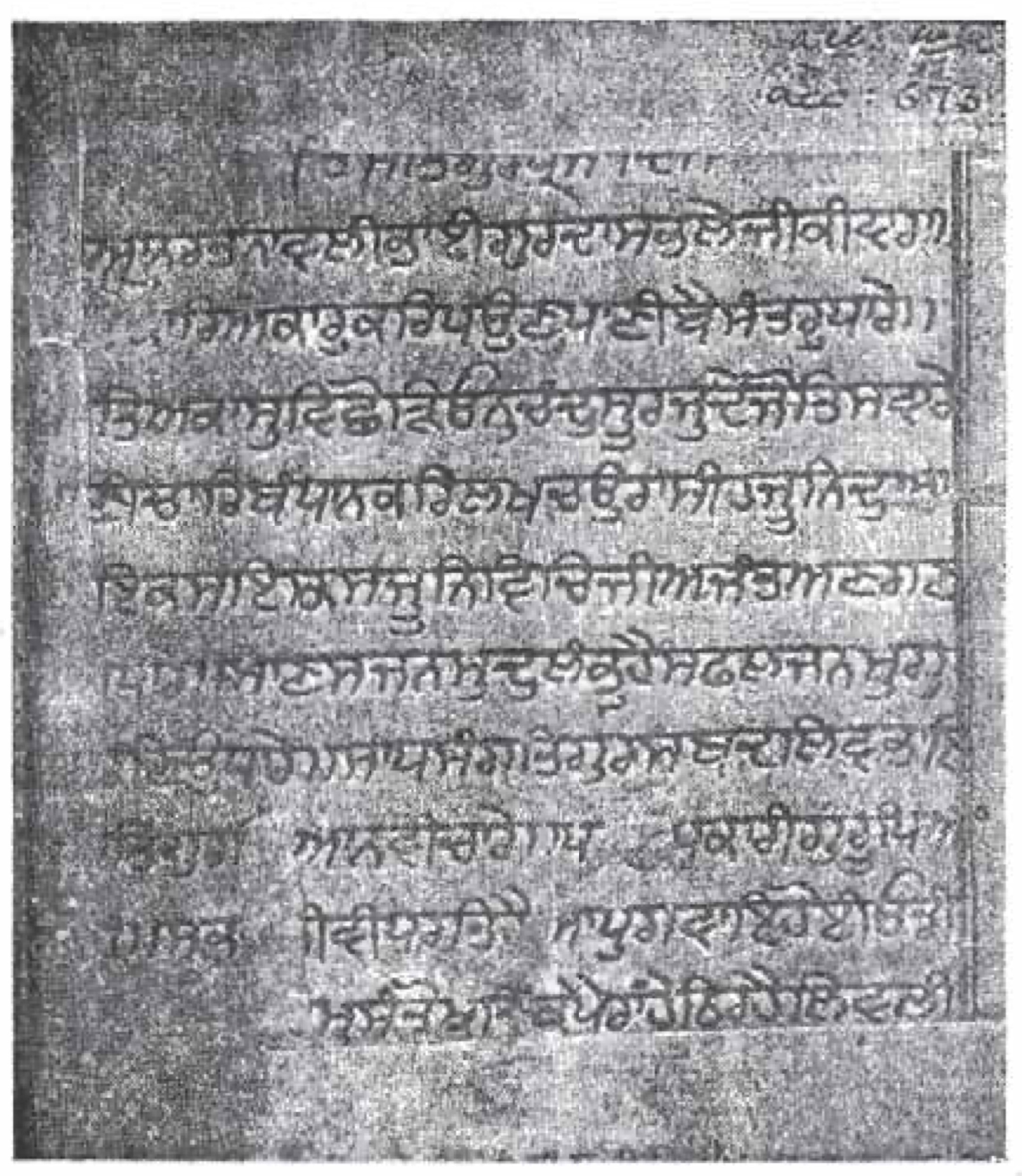
Folio of the Khalsa College manuscript of the Varan Bhai Gurdas

Some 17th century extant manuscripts of the work were identified by Rahuldeep Gill as follows based upon their archaic ordering of the vārs:

- Lamba manuscript – currently held in a private collection in Patiala of the family of Gobind Singh Lamba
- Javaddi manuscript – currently held at Guru Hargobind Library at Javaddi Taksal
- Khalsa College manuscript – currently held at Khalsa College, Amritsar (accession numbers 1453 and 673)

The above three manuscripts can be dated to the 17th century or are copies of 17th century manuscripts. Gill identifies the Lamba manuscript as being the oldest extant manuscript of the work based upon its archaic orthography. The Khalsa College manuscript was likely written later by the same hand as the Lamba manuscript.

== Contents ==
=== Title ===
The full title of the work given in one manuscript dated to 1782 is: Varan Gian Ratnavali Bhai Gurdas Bhalley ka Bolana, meaning "Vars [captioned] Gian Ratnavali. Thus spake Bhai Gurdas Bhalla." Another manuscript (dated to at-least 1732 or earlier) is titled simply as: Bani Bhai Gurdas Bhalley ji ki. Varan. The words Gian Ratnavali as part of a title may have once only applied to the first of forty vars rather than being part of a title to describe the entirety of the work of literature. Originally, the entirety of the work was simply entitled as Varan. The SGPC officially named its publication of the work as Varan Gyan Ratnavali.

=== Structure ===
Each of the 40 chapters of Varan Bhai Gurdas consists of a differing number of Pauris (sections, paragraphs). The composition is a collection of detailed commentary and explanation of theology and the ethics of Sikh beliefs as outlined by the Gurus. It explains the Sikh terms like sangat, haumai, "Gun", Gurmukh and Manmukh, Sat, Naam, etc. Many of the principles of Sikhism are explained in simple terms by Bhai Gurdas and at times in many ways.

The 40 vars maintain a high-degree of similarity in nearly all manuscriptural versions of the work, barring a few variations and discrepancies. Some Sikhs have rejected the authenticity of the 10th or 40th vars of the work specifically, the former based on religious doctrine and the latter based upon linguistic style inconsistency. A notable and outspoken critic of the 10th var was Giani Lal Singh of Sangrur.

=== Appendments ===
Often times, another additional vār, with the title of vār Sri Bhagaut Ji Ki Patshahi Dasvin Ki, is included in the work at a 41st vār. This vār was authored by another, later Bhai Gurdas who was contemporary with Guru Gobind Singh. The 41st vār eulogizes Guru Gobind Singh and the Khalsa.

== Historical reliability ==
The historical reliability of the vāran has been accepted by most Sikhs, but has been doubted by scholars. In particular the contents of the first vār describing the life of Guru Nanak has been challenged for some improbable claims made in the text. The text vaguely describes numerous legendary tales which have been accepted in Sikh tradition despite the text nearing a century after the demise of Guru Nanak.

Dr. McLeod notes that the popular story of Nanak putting jasmine flowers when a cup of milk is brought to him by the pirs of Multan, which is found in the first vār's 44 stanza, is a retelling of a story involving Abd Qadir Gilani and was popularly retold in Punjab with the character and location changed. Gurdas retells the story inserting Nanak as the main character. Dr. Rattan Singh notes the first vār Gurdas writes of Nanak speaking with siddhs at Sumer which is a mythical mountain found in the Puranas. In the same stanza it refers to Nanak speaking with Gorak Nath, who was not a contemporary of Nanak and neither a Siddh. Scholars consider stanza 28-29, and 31 as a fictional invention by Gurdas in order to give a story relating to Nanak's Siddh Gosti.

Gurdas describes Nanak going to Mecca where he lied down with his feet facing a mihrab. A Muslim, named Jivan, is said to have seen the sight and told Nanak to not point his feet at God. Nanak asked the Muslim to move his feet where God was not and when the Muslim moved Nanak's feet the mihrab is said to have moved wherever Nanak's feet went. Following this Gurdas writes that a discussion occurred where Nanak was victorious and his sandals were left as a relic that was worshipped as he headed to Medina. Trumpp has considered the entire account as fiction. McLeod dismisses the miraculous elements of the tale and believes that the story possibly originates from a true tale which did not occur in Mecca or Medina.

In the 35th-36th stanza a story of Nanak visiting Baghdad and having a discourse is told. The historicity of the account told in the vārs is much debated. McLeod holds that Nanak never visited Baghdad. An alleged inscription found in Baba Nanak Shrine which supports Gurdas's account is considered a forgery by scholars.

== Legacy ==
By the 18th century, Sikh authors were already referencing the work, such as Chaupa Singh's Rahitnama, Mani Singh's Gyan Ratnavali, and the author of the Sikhan Di Bhagatmala. According to Bhai Mani Singh, the first Var of the work is the only genuine and attestable janamsakhi tradition covering the life of Guru Nanak. Bhai Mani Singh would author a janamsakhi rendition, known as the Gyan-ratnavali or Bhai Mani Singh Janam Sakhi, based upon the first var of Varan Bhai Gurdas. Kahn Singh Nabha's 1898 work Ham Hindu Nahin references Bhai Gurdas' Varan over forty times. The work is further referenced in a 1911 work of Jodh Singh titled Sikhi Ki Hai ("What is Sikhism"). The vāran of Bhai Gurdas and his other works are one of the only non-scriptural works allowed to be recited during Sikh worship outside of the scriptural texts, with the only other non-scriptural works allowed to be recited being those attributed to Nand Lal Goya. In the 20th century, many Sikh intellectuals started to symbolize Gurdas' vārs as the kunji (exegesis, commentary, literally “key”) to the Sikh scripture.

== See also ==
- Bhai Gurdas
- Sikh scriptures
