= Das Gur Katha =

Sikh text

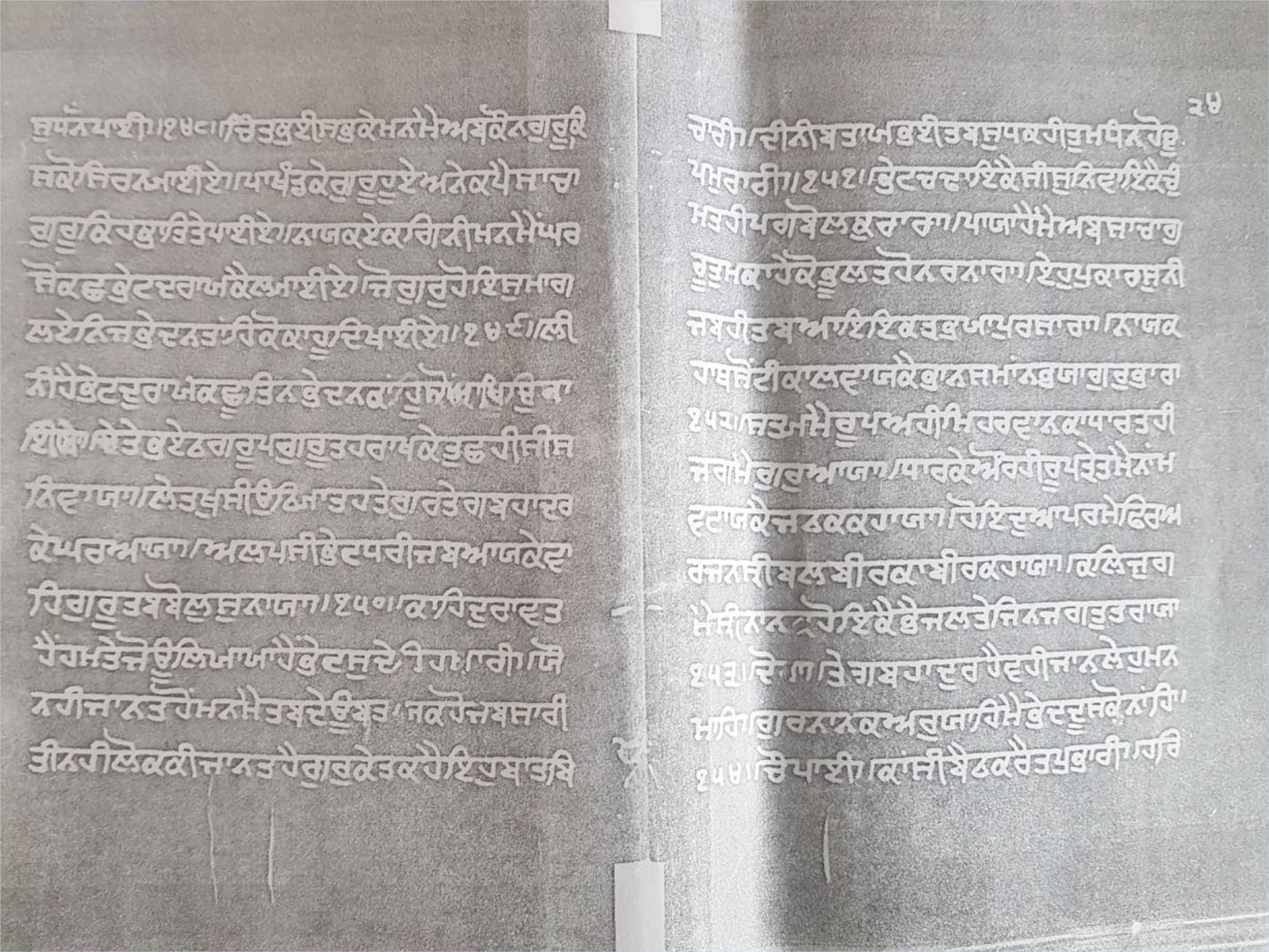
- Folio 24a and 24b from the Das Gur Kathā, S.H.R 1797 A, Amritsar: Khalsa College.
- Author: Kavi Kankan
- Genre: Sikhism

Das Gur Katha ("narration of the ten gurus" or "story of the ten gurus"), authored by Kavi Kankan, is a versified account of the ten human Sikh gurus, especially Guru Hargobind, Guru Tegh Bahadur, and Guru Gobind Singh, and the creation of the Khalsa. It is written in a mixture of Braj, Persian, Hindi, and Punjabi. It bears influence from and references to the Dasam Granth. It contains 234 stanzas written in the poetical metres of Dohā, Savaiyyā, Chaupaī, Pauṛī, Soraṭhā and Aṛill. The work contains a tale involving Guru Gobind Singh and a devi. It also contains a rehatnama.

== Manuscripts ==
The following manuscripts of the work are known:

- Punjab Public Library, Lahore, dating to c. 1696 (in 1956 a photostat copy of this manuscript was made for the Library of Khalsa College, Amritsar) - it is unknown if the original manuscript is still extant in Lahore
- Das Gur Kathā, S.H.R 1797 A, Khalsa College, Amritsar, dating to 1699

== Dating ==
Kamalroop Singh Birk dates the original manuscript of the work to c. 1696, but also dates it to the range of c. 1696–1699. Kirpal Singh dates it to c. 1699. Gurinder Singh Mann (U.K.) dates it to c. 1700. Alternative dating claims are closer to the early 19th century, being written by a different Kankan who was not a contemporary of Guru Gobind Singh.

== Publication and translation ==
The work was unknown to scholars until it was discovered in Lahore. In 1956, a photostat copy of the original manuscript at Punjab Public Library in Lahore, Pakistan was made for the collection of Khalsa College, Amritsar. Kirpal Singh published an annotated Punjabi edition of the text in 1967. However, Kirpal Singh did not include some lines in his publication that was found in the original work. The first English translation of the work was completed by Kamalroop Singh Birk and published in 2024.
