= Bhai Nand Lal =

Poet in Guru Gobind Singh's court

Bhai Sahib Nand Lal ਨੰਦ ਲਾਲ نند لال Ji
- Born: Unknown; 1633; Ghazni, Mughal Empire (present-day Afghanistan)
- Died: 1713 (aged 79–80); Multan, Mughal Empire (present-day Punjab, Pakistan)
- Resting place: Multan
- Education: Persian, Arabic, Punjabi, Mathematics
- Occupation: Poet
- Relatives: Diwan Chhaju Mal (Chajju Ram) (father)
- Writing career
- Pen name: Goya
- Language: Persian, Arabic, Punjabi
- Period: 1633—1720

Bhai Nand Lal (Persian: بھائی نند لال; Punjabi: ਭਾਈ ਨੰਦ ਲਾਲ; 1633 – 1713 or 1720), also known by his pen name Goya (Persian: گویا; Punjabi: ਗੋਯਾ), was a 17th-century Sikh poet in the Punjab region. He served as the Mir Munshi of the Mughal prince (later emperor) Bahadur Shah. He would be bestowed with the Mulla Goya title by Aurangzeb for his theological expositions. Later, he came the most celebrated poet from the Kavi Darbar of Guru Gobind Singh. A notable work of his were the ghazals he produced. Bhai Nand Lal, a respected Persian scholar, was one of the 52 poets associated with Guru Gobind Singh. He was part of the bhai tradition.

== Early life ==
Nand Lal was born in Ghazni, Afghanistan, in 1633, he was 33 years older than the Guru. His father, Diwan Chhajju Ram, held the important post of chief secretary to the governor of Ghazni.

From an early age, Nand Lal showed great promise. He quickly mastered Persian and Arabic and began writing poetry in Persian at just 12 years old under the pen name "Goya." After losing his mother at 17 and his father at 19, he saw no future for his talents in Ghazni. He decided to move to India, selling his family property and, along with his two brothers and two Pathan servants, journeyed through Kandahar and the Bolan Pass until he reached Multan. There, he purchased a house and married a local Sikh woman. Soon, he was offered a job by the Nawab, who eventually promoted him to Mir Munshi—a chief secretary role. In this capacity, he led an expedition against a notorious bandit named Sahu, resulting in the capture of the bandit and the killing of 700 of his followers.

== Service of the Mughals ==
However, Multan, known for its harsh climate and poverty, did not suit Nand Lal compared to the beauty of Ghazni. He eventually moved to Delhi, where his talents caught the attention of Prince Muazzam (later Emperor Bahadur Shah I). On one occasion, Nand Lal drafted a reply to a letter from the King of Iran on behalf of the prince, a draft that was highly praised. In another instance, while at Emperor Aurangzeb’s court, a debate arose over the meaning of a Quranic verse. When the Muslim scholars could not offer a satisfactory explanation, Nand Lal provided an answer that pleased the emperor. However, Aurangzeb, upon learning that a Hindu had given the explanation, suggested that such a learned man should convert to Islam. Despite being honored with a robe and a cash prize of Rs. 500, Nand Lal soon found himself in a difficult position. In 1686, when Prince Muazzam was imprisoned, Nand Lal lost his job. Aurangzeb tried to retain him in the court by pressuring him to convert to Islam, but Nand Lal steadfastly refused, even though it put his life at risk. As a result, he left for Northern India. Before departing, he composed a couplet expressing his inner sorrow and deep faith in God,

== Service of the Sikhs ==
As per the Guru Kian Sakhian, Nand Lal joined the poet-court of Guru Gobind Singh earlier in 1682. When he arrived, he offered two works to the guru, the Bandaginama (later renamed Zindaginama by the guru), authored by him, and the Hanuman Natak, authored by Hirdai Ram Bhalla. The guru administered the charan-pahul ceremony for Nand Lal to initiate him as a Sikh.

Another tradition goes as follows: Nand Lal’s wife, coming from a Sikh family in Multan, regularly recited Gurbani and was familiar with the Gurmukhi script. Influenced by her devotion, Nand Lal himself began singing the hymns of the Sikh Gurus and learning Gurmukhi. With Guru Gobind Singh’s name widely respected throughout Northern India, Nand Lal decided to meet him. Leaving his family behind in Multan, he set out for Anandpur around 1689.

He lived in a small house and did not visit the Guru himself, believing that if his poetry had true value, the Guru would call for him. Instead, he wrote a Persian poem expressing his deep longing to meet the Guru and sent it to him. The poem spoke of his restless heart and overflowing love. However, Guru Gobind Singh remained silent, expecting Nand Lal to come on his own. After a few days, Nand Lal wrote another poem with even greater intensity, describing his pain as fire consuming wood. He lamented that not only he but the whole world seemed to be burning in this flame of love.

Eventually, the Guru invited Nand Lal to meet him. At 23 years old, Guru Gobind Singh had an extraordinary presence. When Nand Lal saw him for the first time, he was overwhelmed by the Guru’s radiance and grandeur. He immediately praised the Guru, calling him the prince of heaven and the king of all beauties. Deeply moved, he composed another poem on the spot, declaring that the glories of heaven and earth were nothing compared to a single strand of the Guru’s hair,Recognizing Nand Lal’s talent and devotion, Guru Gobind Singh admitted him to his court as the topmost poet. One day, Nand Lal presented a collection of his poems to the Guru, calling it Bandgi Nama (The Book of Homage). The Guru renamed it Zindgi Nama (The Book of Life), stating that the poetry was so deeply spiritual that it was not just about devotion but the essence of life itself.

During Guru Gobind Singh’s time, there were conflicts with the Mughals and local kings. Emperor Aurangzeb sent his son, Prince Muazzam, to suppress the rebellious kings and deal with the Guru. However, Bhai Nand Lal intervened, convincing the prince that Guru Gobind Singh was not involved in any rebellion. Instead, he portrayed the Guru as a saint and suggested that the Guru could be an ally in the Mughal power struggle. In 1700, during the Holi festival, Guru Gobind Singh held grand celebrations. Nand Lal composed a Persian poem describing the beauty of the festival, where the Guru sprinkled colors and the air was filled with fragrances of rose water, amber, musk, and saffron. Nand Lal remained with the Guru until December 1704. When the Guru’s family was separated after the Battle of Sarsa, Nand Lal helped ensure the safety of Mata Sundari and Mata Sahib Kaur, guiding them to Delhi. He used his connections with influential nobles to protect them from Wazir Khan, the Mughal governor of Sirhind, who was hostile to Sikhs. After Aurangzeb’s death in 1707, Nand Lal played an important role in connecting Guru Gobind Singh with the new Mughal emperor, Bahadur Shah I. He served as a secretary in Bahadur Shah’s court and was present in his military campaigns. Even after Guru Gobind Singh’s passing, Nand Lal witnessed the power struggles among Aurangzeb’s successors. He was with Bahadur Shah when the emperor launched a campaign against Banda Singh Bahadur. Later, he accompanied Bahadur Shah to Lahore. When the emperor died in 1712, Nand Lal joined his son, Jahandar Shah. However, after Jahandar Shah’s defeat in 1713 by Farrukhsiyar, whose brutal execution of the former emperor shocked the city, Nand Lal escaped Delhi and returned to Multan.

== Death ==
Bhai Nand Lal came to Multan once again in 1712 after the death of Muazzam and started a school of Arabic and Persian. This school was still functioning in 1849 when the British annexed Punjab. Lal died in 1713 in Multan.

== Works ==
Some of his major works include:

- Diwan-i-Goya (دیوان گویا) – contains 63 Ghazals and 12 Rubaiyāt (quatrains) and some verses.
- Zindaginamah (زندگینامه) – It is a Masnawi of 510 verses which discusses the spirituality and high-spirit in one's life. Originally titled Bandaginama.
- Ganjnamah (گنجنامه) – Ganjnamah contains short poems eulogizing the Ten Sikh Gurus.
- Tankhanama – It contains the code of conducts for Sikhs and Khalsa.
- Jot Bigās
- Arz-ul-Alfaz (عرض الالفاظ)
- Tausif-o-Sana (توصیف و ثناء)
- Khatimat (also spelt as Khatimah)
- Dastoor-ul-Insha (دستور الانشا)
- Faiz-i-Noor (فیض نور)

== Translations ==
His works, originally in Persian, were translated into Punjabi and English. The translation of Diwan-e-Goya, titled The Pilgrim’s Way by B.P.L Bedi into English has a foreword from Dr. Sarvepalli Radhakrishnan and was published by Punjabi University Patiala.

== See also ==
- Bhai Gurdas
- Giani Sant Singh Maskeen
