= Battle of Sarsa =

18th-century battle in North India

- Part of Mughal-Sikh Wars and Hill States-Sikh Wars
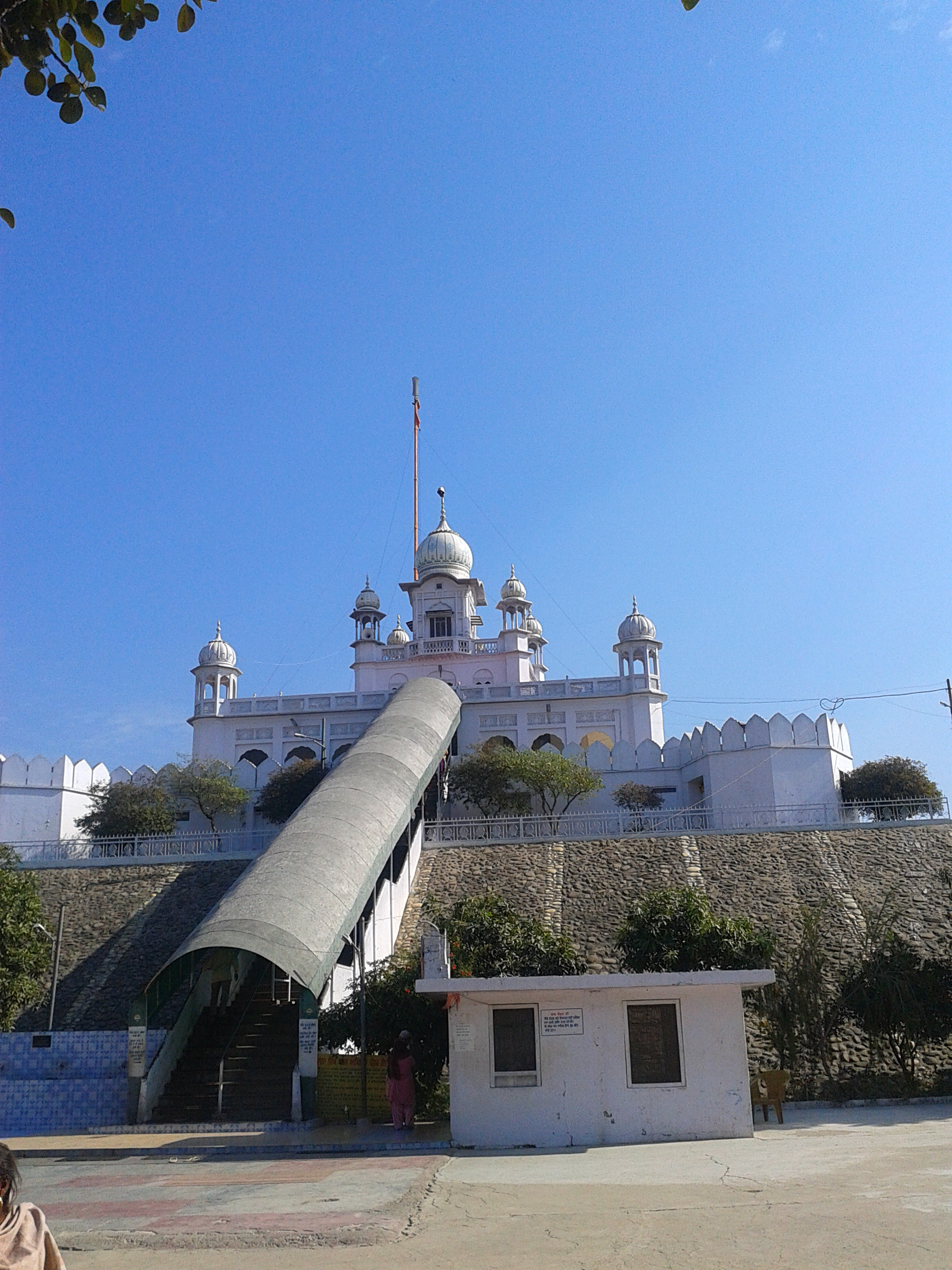
- Parivar Vichora gurdwara
Date	21 December 1704
Location	Near the River Sarsa
Result	Mughal victory (Note: "Despite promising Guru Gobind Singh safe passage after the siege of Anandpur, Mughal General Wazir Khan pursued the survivors. At Shahi Tibbi, Jiwan Singh was killed in a rear- guard action. The Sikhs were then destroyed while crossing the Sarsa, with the Guru’s two younger sons captured and later murdered. Gobind was defeated next day at Chamkaur (21 December 1704).")

Belligerents
Khalsa (Sikhs)	Mughal Empire Alliance of Hill Rajas, led by Kahlur

Commanders and leaders
Guru Gobind Singh; Bhai Jiwan Singh †; Bhai Udai Singh †; Bhai Mani Singh; Ajit Singh	Wazir Khan (Sirhind); Raja Ajmer Chand; General Khawaja Mohammed; General Nahar Khan; Governor Zabardast Khan

Strength
400–500	Unknown

Casualties and losses
Sikh General Bhai Jiwan Singh was killed.; Bhai Udai Singh was killed.	

The Battle of Sarsa was fought on 21 December 1704 between the Khalsa and the Mughal Empire.

== Background ==
By 1704, Guru Gobind Singh and his Sikh followers were under immense pressure as the Mughals and hill chiefs laid siege to Anandpur Sahib, cutting off all supplies and forcing the Sikhs to survive on leaves and tree bark. Many, including the Guru’s mother, urged him to accept Wazir Khan’s offer of safe passage, backed by an oath on the Quran and promises from the hill chiefs. Knowing the enemy’s deceit, the Guru tested their sincerity by sending out bullock carts filled with worthless items, which were immediately looted. Despite this betrayal, continued pressure from his followers and mother left him with no choice but to agree to leave. On the night of December 20-21, 1704, under cold winds and rain, the Guru’s family and a group of Sikhs left first, led by Udai Singh, while the Guru planned to follow. However, as they moved out, the Mughals and hill forces broke their oath and attacked, leading to the chaotic and tragic Battle of Sarsa, where the Sikhs were scattered, and many lost their lives.

== Battle ==
The Sarsa River, usually dry, had turned into a powerful, raging current due to heavy rains in the hills, making it impossible to cross. The first group of Sikhs waited on the riverbank for Guru Gobind Singh to arrive. The Guru set out with his two elder sons and about 400 Sikhs. Before he could reach the river, his group was attacked by a large Mughal force under Wazir Khan. While the Guru and his men were engaged in battle, another Mughal unit launched an assault on the Sikhs waiting by the riverbank.

Amidst the rain, cold, darkness, and fierce fighting, confusion spread among the Sikhs. Many were killed, including Udai Singh and his warriors. Some courageous Sikhs attempted to cross the dangerous river on horseback, carrying the Guru’s family with them. Though they reached the other side safely, they lost all their belongings, including important manuscripts, to the floodwaters. After crossing the river, the Guru’s family was separated. His mother, Mata Gujri, along with his two younger sons, Baba Zorawar Singh and Fateh Singh, were unable to travel far. They were taken in by Gangu, a former servant of the Guru’s household, who led them to his village, Saheri. Meanwhile, Mata Sundari and Mata Sahib Devi disguised themselves as village women and moved toward Ambala for safety. Gobind Singh and his men also suffered heavy losses. Despite fighting bravely, most of his warriors were either killed in battle or drowned while trying to cross the river. By the time he reached the other side, only 43 Sikhs remained with him, including his two elder sons, Ajit Singh and Jujhar Singh, the "Five Beloved Ones" (Panj Pyare), and other warriors. As they continued their journey, they received alarming news—nearly a thousand Mughal soldiers were marching toward them from Sirhind, while another force was crossing the Sarsa River.

== Sources ==
- Jacques, Tony (2007). Dictionary of Battles and Sieges: A Guide to 8500 Battles from Antiquity Through the Twenty-first Century. Greenwood Press. ISBN 978-0-313-33536-5. Archived from the original on 2015-06-26.
