= Bhai Mani Singh =

Sikh religious leader and martyr (1644–1738)

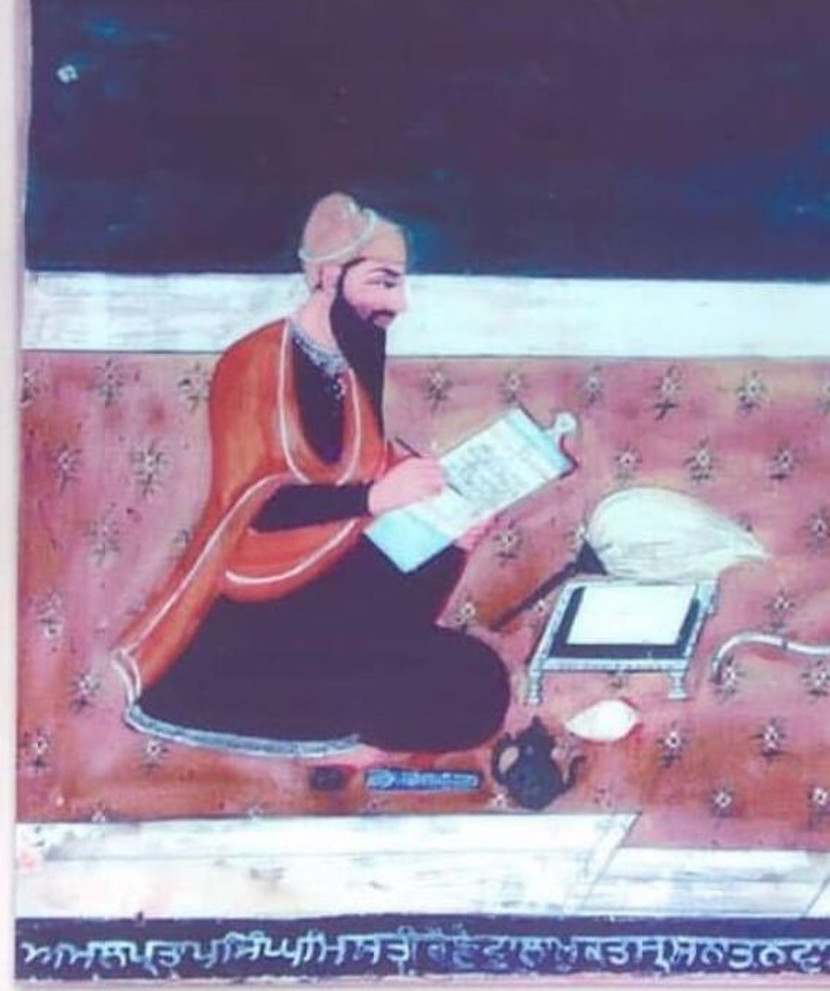

Jathedar of the Akal Takht
- In office 1721–1737
- Preceded by: Bhai Gurdas
- Succeeded by: Darbara Singh

Personal details
- Born: Mani Ram; 7 April 1644 Alipur Raj, Multan, Panjab
- Died: 14 June 1738 (aged 94) Nakhaas Chowk, Lahore, Panjab
- Cause of death: Dismemberment
- Spouse: Seeto Kaur
- Children: Chitar Singh; Bachittar Singh; Udai Singh; Anaik Singh; Ajab Singh
- Parents: Rao Mai Das (father); Madri Bai (mother)
- Known for: Transcribing the Guru Granth Sahib; Gyan Ratnavali; Writing Bhagat Ratnavali; Being the 3rd Granthi of Akal Takht; Being executed by dismemberment for his refusal to convert to Islam

Bhai Mani Singh (7 April 1644 – 14 June 1738) was an 18th-century Sikh scholar and martyr. He was a childhood companion of Guru Gobind Singh and took the vows of Sikhism when the Guru inaugurated the Khalsa in March 1699. Soon after that, the Guru sent him to Amritsar to take charge of Harmandir Sahib, which had been without a custodian since 1696. He took control and steered the course of Sikh destiny at a critical stage in Sikh history. He was also a teacher of the Gianian Bunga (learning Institute), later becoming known as the "Amritsari Taksal", currently located in Sato Ki Gali.

He was part of the bhai tradition. He is remembered by Sikhs as one of their notable martyrs of the 18th century. The nature of his death in which he was dismembered joint by joint has become a part of the daily Sikh Ardas (prayer). Mani Singh was one of three Sikhs of the 18th century who are believed to restored the Dasam Granth via gathering scattered writings, the other two namely being Deep Singh and Sukha Singh of Patna.

== Family ==
=== Ancestry ===
Mani Singh was originally called Mani Ram, and was the son of Mai Das of Alipur. He had two elder brothers: Jet (Bhai Jetha Singh) and Dayal Das.

Mani Singh was one of the 12 sons of Mai Das. His grandfather was Rao Ballu, a reputable warrior, who was a general in Guru Hargobind's army. Mani Singh's family consisted of notable warriors, among them his cousin Bhagwant Singh Bangeshwar, who was a ruler in Aurangzeb time. His brother, Dayala was killed at Delhi with Guru Tegh Bahadur. Mani Singh spent a considerable part of his life in service at Harmandir Sahib in Amritsar.

=== Marriages and children ===
At the age of 15, Mani Singh was married to Seeto Bai, daughter of Raav Lakhi Rai Jadhaun Jadovanshi Raav (King) of Khairpur Tamewali now in Pakistan.

List of Bhai Mani Singh's sons:

1. Chitar Singh, killed with Mani Singh in Lahore in 1734.
2. Bachitar Singh, killed in the battle of Nihan near Anandpur Sahib in 1704.
3. Udai Singh, killed in Shahi Tibi near Anandpur Sahib in 1704.
4. Anaik Singh, killed in the battle of Chamkaur in 1704.
5. Ajab Singh, killed in the battle of Chamkaur in 1704.
6. Ajaib Singh, killed in the battle of Chamkaur in 1704.
7. Gurbaksh Singh, killed with Mani Singh in Lahore in 1734.
8. Bhagwan Singh
9. Balram Singh
10. Desa Singh – the author of the Rehat Maryada (Code of conduct) of the Khalsa.

Seven of Mani Singh's sons were from his first wife, Seeto Bai Ji and the remainder from his second wife Khemi Bai Ji.

== Life and work ==
=== Service of Guru Har Rai ===
When Mani Singh was 13 years old, his father, Rao Mai Das, took him to Guru Har Rai at Kiratpur to pay homage. Mani Singh spent about two years at Kiratpur in the service of Guru Har Rai, scrubbing cooking pots and utensils. He also attended to other chores. When Mani Singh was 15 years old, his father applied to Guru Har Rai for leave to be granted to Mani Singh for a short period. Mani Singh and his father returned to their village Alipur where he was married to Bibi Seetobai. Subsequently, Mani Singh, accompanied by his elder brothers, Bhai Jetha Singh and Bhai Dial Das, went to Kiratpur and presented themselves before Guru Har Rai for service at his shrine.

=== Service of Guru Har Krishan ===
After the passing of Guru Har Rai, Mani Singh started serving Guru Har Krishan. When Guru Har Krishan proceeded to Delhi, Mani Singh was one of the Sikhs who accompanied him.

=== Service of Guru Tegh Bahadur ===
When Guru Har Krishan died on 30 March 1664 in Delhi, Mani Singh escorted the Guru Har Krishan Ji's mother, Mata Sulakhani, to Bakala and presented himself before Guru Teg Bahadur for service. Mani Singh's elder brothers, Bhai Jetha Singh and Bhai Dial Das, also arrived at Bakala for service with the guru. Mani Singh was at that time 20 years of age. After serving some time in the service of Guru Teg Bahahdur, Mani Singh took leave of the Guru and returned to his village in Alipur.

Mani Singh later proceeded to Anandpur Sahib for the Vaisakhi festival, accompanied by his family. Guru Teg Bahadur had then just arrived at Anandpur Sahib after a preaching tour in the East. When Guru Teg Bahadur heeded the appeal of the Kashmiri Pandits and their request for help in saving the Hindu religion, Guru Teg Bahadur decided to proceed to Delhi. Bhai Jetha and Mani Singh and some other Sikhs remained at Anandpur with Guru Gobind Singh to look after him. Bhai Mati Das, Bhai Sati Das and Bhai Dial Das accompanied Guru Teg Bahadur to Delhi. They were arrested together with Guru Teg Bahadur and taken to Delhi where all of them were put to death.

=== Service of Guru Gobind Singh ===
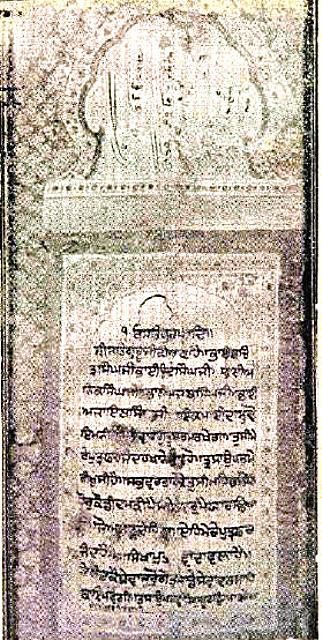
Hukamnama sent by Guru Gobind Singh blessing the family of Bhai Mani Singh, dated to 2 October 1703

Bhai Mani Singh was a childhood companion of Guru Gobind Singh. He was not of the same age as Guru Gobind Singh (at that time called Gobind Rai) but much older. Mani Singh remained in his company even after Gobind Rai ji had ascended the religious seat as Guru. Mani Singh accompanied the Guru to the seclusion of Paonta where Guru Gobind Singh spent some three years exclusively given to literary work.

Mani Singh was not only a great scholar of Sikh sacred scripture and wrote books on Sikhi but was also a warrior who accompanied Guru Gobind Singh as one of his body guards on many occasions. The brave deeds of Mani Singh in so many battles earned him the reputation of a great warrior. In his position of being the Guru's Diwan (Minister) he had to attend to many matters in the Guru's establishment. Nevertheless, he had time to study the Sikh scripture under the Guru's guidance and became an accomplished theologian. He acquired so much knowledge and understanding of Gurbani, that he used to do Katha (Exposition) of the Granth Sahib to the Sangat (Congregation) both at Anandpur Sahib and later at the Harmandir Sahib.

In 1685, when Guru Gobind Singh went to Nahan, on the invitation of Raja Medni Prakash, Bhai Mani Singh was one of the Sikhs who accompanied the Guru.

In 1687, when the Guru received a request for help from the widow of Baba Ram Rai, because the Masands were ill treating her, Guru Gobind Singh accompanied by Mani Singh went to Derah Doon, taught the Masands a good lesson and put them in their proper place.

In 1688, at the Barsi (Death anniversary) of Baba Ram Rai, Guru Gobind Singh sent Mani Singh at the head of a Jatha of 50 Sikhs to represent him at the Barsi.

Bhai Mani Singh accompanied Guru Gobind Singh when he went across the banks of the Yamuna River to Paonta, Himachal. Bhai Mani Singh fought in the Battle of Bhangani in 1688 ca. to defend Paonta from the joint attack of all the hill rajas. Mani Singh showed his prowess with the sword. In this battle his younger brother Hati Chand was killed.

In 1690, in the Battle of Nadaun, Mani Singh showed great bravery and prowess with the sword; so much so that after the victory of the Guru's forces, Guru Gobind Singh bestowed on Mani Singh the title of Diwan (Minister).

==== Creation of the Khalsa ====
In 1699, on Vaisakhi day when Guru Gobind Singh established the Khalsa Panth and Bhai Mani Singh took Amrit at the hands of Guru Gobind Singh and from Mani Ram he became Mani Singh.

On this day Bhai Mani Singh's brothers, Rai Singh, Roop Singh and Man Singh were initiated and five of Mani Singh's sons were also initiated as Khalsas.

They were:

1. Bachitar Singh
2. Udai Singh
3. Anaik Singh
4. Ajab Singh
5. Ajaib Singh

In 1699, after the Khalsa Panth was created with the famous Amrit ceremony and Rahit Maryada (Code of conduct of the Khalsa) was ordained, Guru Gobind Singh sent Bhai Mani Singh and five other Khalsas to Amritsar with instructions to take possession of the Harmandir Sahib. Bhai Mani Singh was appointed Granthi of the Harmandir Sahib and Jathedar of the Akal Takhat. Mani Singh thus became the third Granthi of the Harmandir Sahib, after Baba Buddha and Bhai Gurdas. Apart from Kirtan Singing of hymns from the Granth Sahib, Bhai Mani Singh used to do Katha (Exposition of Gurbani) which became a very popular daily feature. Rahit Maryada was propagated and arrangements were made for administering Pahul (initiation) to new converts to the Khalsa fold. As a result of Bhai Mani Singh's efforts, a large number of Jats (farmers) from northern Punjab were initiated as Khalsas, whose numbers increased day by day. Many of them, when they went back to their villages, persuaded others to take the pahul and become Khalsas. Periodically, Bhai Mani Singh used to go to Anandpur Sahib to pay homage to Guru Gobind Singh and keep him informed of the affairs and happenings at Amritsar.

In the first battle fought by Guru Gobind Singh after the creation of the Khalsa Panth in 1699, against Raja Ajmer Chand and his Mughal supporters, Bhai Mani Singh and his sons were in the first line of the Guru's forces. The Guru was so pleased with the bravery and the performance of Mani Singh's sons that after the Khalsa victory, the Guru issued a special Hukumnama (Edict) in praise of them. Mani Singh's sons mentioned in the Hukumnama were : Bachitar Singh, Udai Singh, Anaik Singh, Ajab Singh, and Ajaib Singh.

Bhai Mani Singh took an active role in the battle of Naduan in 1704. When Guru Gobind Singh Ji left Anandpur on the night of 20 December 1704, his family got separated at river Sirsa in the confusion created by the Mughal attack. Bhai Mani Singh took Mata Sundri and Mata Sahib Devan to Delhi via Ambala.

In 1704, Bhai Mani Singh escorted Guru Sahib's wife and Mata Sahib Devan to Talwandi Sabo where the Guru was staying after defeating the Mughal army at Muktsar. Here Guru Gobind Singh from memory recited the current version of the Guru Granth Sahib while Bhai Mani Singh transcribed it.

When Guru Sahib left Agra with Emperor Bahadur Shah for Nanded in 1707, Mata Sahib Devan and Bhai Mani Singh accompanied him. Afterwards Bhai Mani Singh escorted Mata Sahib Devan back to Delhi where she lived with Mata Sundri for the rest of her life.

=== Tat Khalsa ===
Mani Singh served as a lead figure of the Tat Khalsa along with Mata Sundari in opposition to Banda Singh and later the Bandai Khalsa. The Tat Khalsa was ruled to be the original Khalsa in 1721 by Mani Singh through a series of ceremonies, but many Bandais opposed this. The Tat Khalsa under Mani Singh later fought and killed a large number of Bandai Khalsa, with those who converted to the Tat Khalsa rank surviving. The Tat Khalsa attacked Dera Banda Singh and executed all Bandai's who were found with Mani Singh leading the force. Mani Singh sat himself on the gaddi (head seat) of the dera.

== Role in Sikh history ==
=== A scholar ===
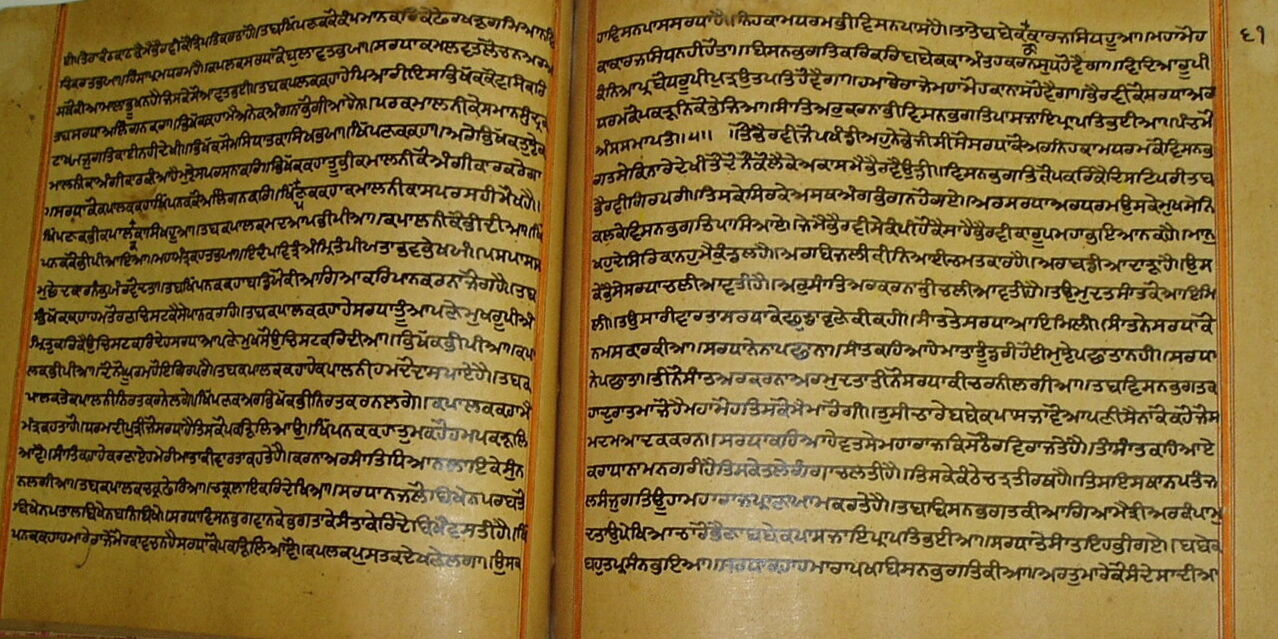
Manuscript of the 'Guru Sakhian' (stories of the Gurus), by Bhai Mani Singh, handwritten in the 18th century

Bhai Mani Singh acted as scribe when Guru Gobind Singh Ji dictated Sri Guru Granth Sahib.

Bhai Mani Sahib collected the Gurbani (Literally "Word of the Guru") of Guru Gobind Singh Ji and compiled it in the Guru Granth Sahib (Sikhs living guru). The writings included in the Dasam Granth were composed at different times by the Guru himself.

He expanded the first of Bhai Gurdas's Vaars into a life of Guru Nanak which is called Gyan Ratnavali. Mani Singh wrote another work, the Bhagat Ratnawali (sometimes called Sikhan di Baghat Mala), an expansion of Bhai Gurdas's eleventh Vaar, which contains a list of famous Sikhs up to the time of Guru Har Gobind.

In his capacity as a Granthi of Darbar Sahib at the Golden Temple, Bhai Mani Singh is also stated to have composed the Ardas (Supplication) in its current format; he also started the tradition of mentioning deeds of various Gursikhs with the supplication.

=== Leadership at Harmandir Sahib ===
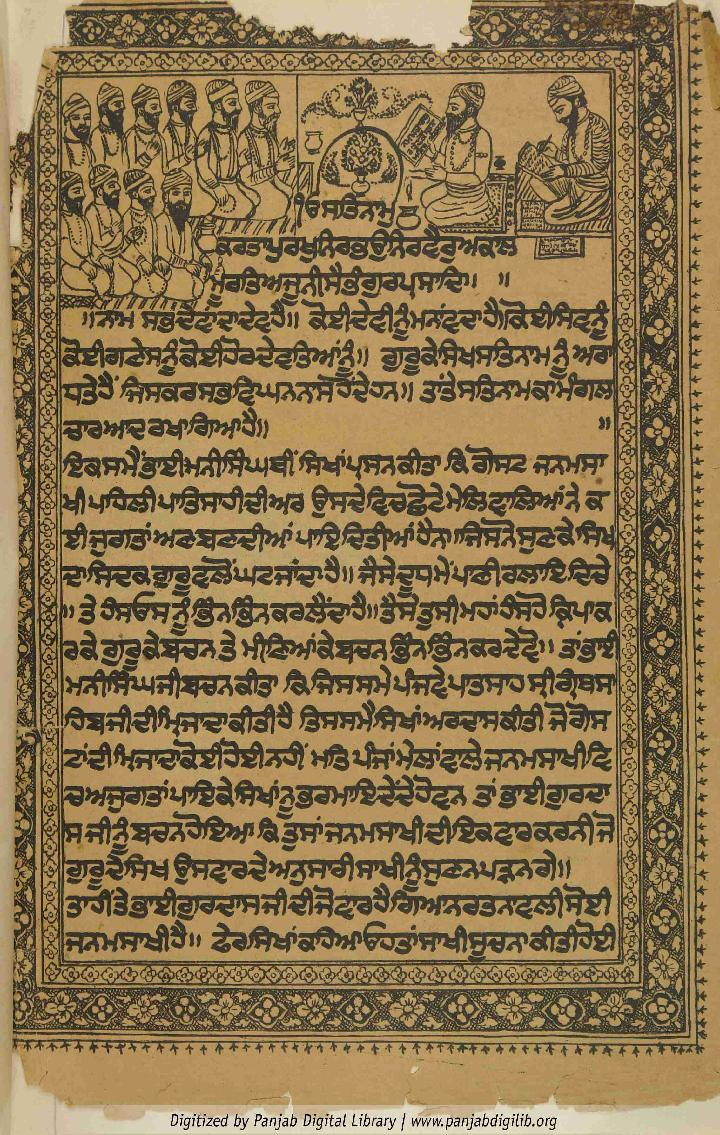
Artwork from an illustrated page of the 'Gosht Janam Sakhi' showing Shaheed Bhai Mani Singh performing Katha (Sikh religious discourse lecture) whilst the Sikhs are writing it down

Bhai Mani Singh who was under the presence of Guru Gobind Singh in 1690s had taken over the Harmandir Sahib at Amritsar in mid-1699 from Minas. After initiating the people of Majha to the Khalsa Panth Bhai Mani Singh came back to Anandpur Sahib. Bhai Mani Singh actively taught the reading of Gurbani and its philosophy to the Sikhs.

According to some Hukamnamas, Bhai Mani Singh was heading the shrine in 1716. He spent the period of worst persecution in post 1716 at the village of Baganwala (Nanaksar Bhaga) in Jhang district. In 1718, he held discourse on the life story of the sixth Guru to the congregation at Baganwala. This account became known as Gurbilas Patshahi 6 (the oldest complete written record of the Guru's life).

In 1720, Mata Sunder Kaur learned of the trouble that was brewing between the Tat Khalsa (A sect of Khalsa who were strict followers of Guru Gobind Singh) and Bandai Khalsa (a sect of Khalsa who regarded Banda Singh Bahadur as the Guru) military factions of the Sikhs. She appointed Bhai Mani Singh as the Granthi of Harmandir Sahib and sent him to Amritsar with Mama Kirpal Singh (Chand), the maternal uncle of Guru Gobind Singh Ji. On his arrival at Amritsar in 1721. Bhai Mani Singh restored peace among the Khalsa, by casting lots and the Tat Khalsa was declared to have won, and put the affairs of Harmandir Sahib in order.

After Bhai Mani Singh's execution the next prominent Sikh leader was Nawab Kapur Singh (1697–1753).

=== Execution ===
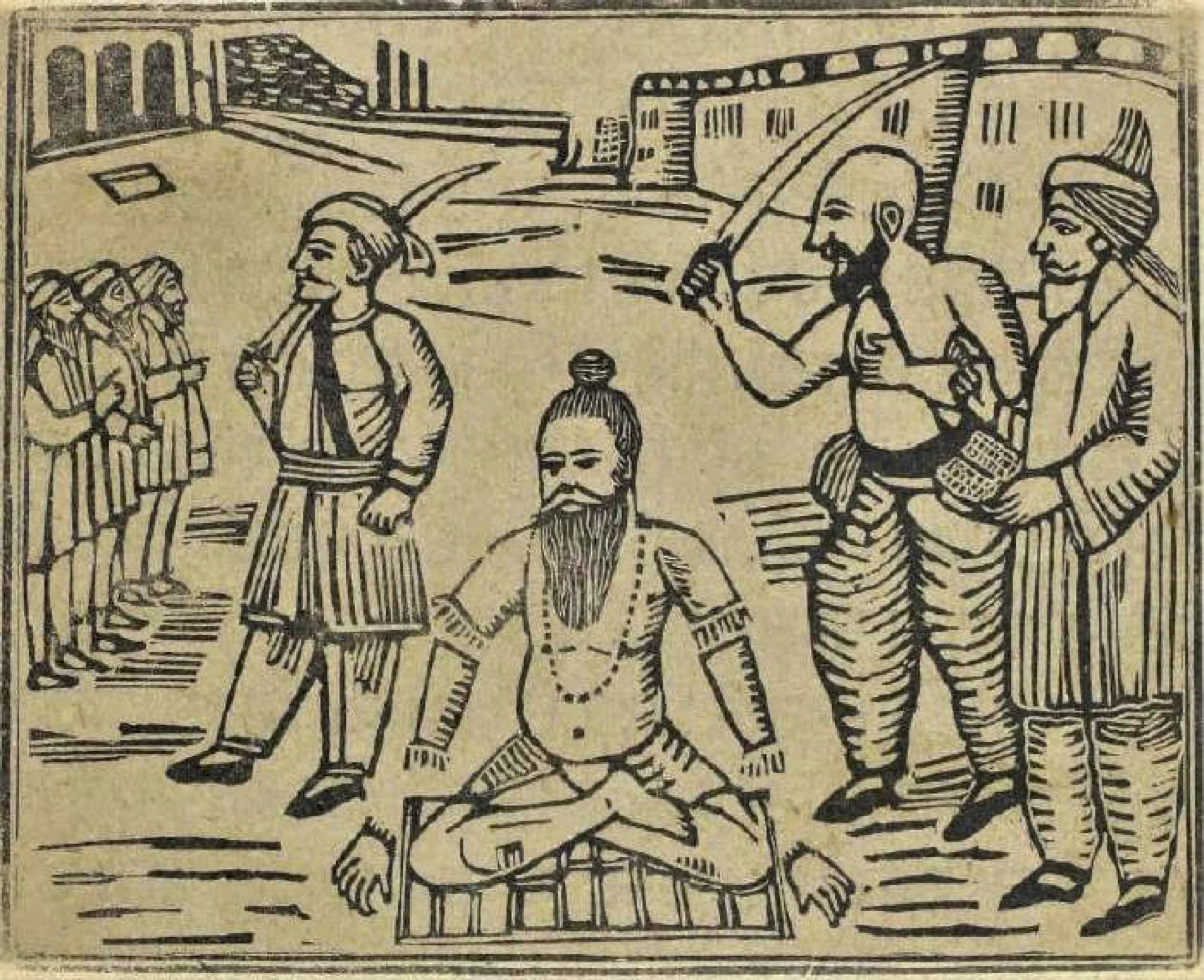
19th century depiction of the martyrdom and execution of Bhai Mani Singh by dismemberment.

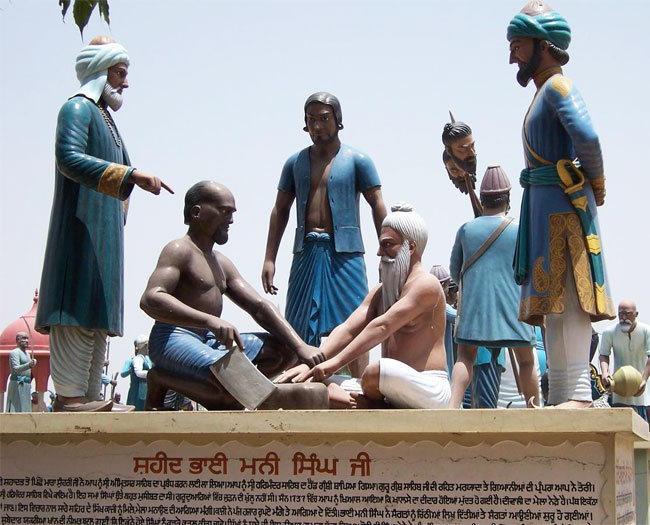
Diorama statues from Mehdiana Sahib depicting Bhai Mani Singh being executed by dismemberment.

Around 1737, Bhai Mani Singh asked to Governor of Lahore, Zakaria Khan, for permission to hold the Diwali festival to celebrate Bandi Chhor Divas at the Harmandir Sahib. The permission was granted for a tribute of Rs. 5,000. He hoped that he would be able to pay the sum out of the offerings to be made by the Sikhs who were invited to come, and issued initiations to various Sikhs for this purpose. The Governor alongside Diwan Lakhpat Rai had different intentions and he sent secret orders to his forces to make a surprise attack on the Sikhs during the festival. Bhai Mani Singh learned of this plan and sent messages to tell the Sikhs not to come; those that did left due to the presence of a military force and suspicious movement of the officers. Thus, no money could be collected or paid to the government; and Bhai Mani Singh was ordered to be executed.

Bhai Mani Singh was taken to Lahore in chains; when he could not pay the dues he had agreed to pay the Mughals (to legally hold the event) he was ordered to convert to Islam. Refusing to give up his beliefs he was condemned to death by dismemberment. When the executioner started to begin from his wrists, Bhai Mani Singh reminded the executioner of the sentence, reminding the executioner of his punishment and to start from the joints in his hands.

== Legacy ==
A samadhi dedicated to him was built at the location opposite of the Masti Gate of Lahore Fort where he is believed to have been executed by dismembership in 1737, now known as Gurdwara Shaheedganj Bhai Mani Singh (31°35'13.2"N, 74°19'02.4"E). The edifice was constructed during the reign of Maharaja Ranjit Singh. It remains open to the public during daytime.

== Battles fought by Bhai Mani Singh ==
- Battle of Bhangani (1688)
- Battle of Nadaun (1691)
- Battle of Anandpur (1699)
- Battle of Amritsar (1709)

== See also ==
- Bhai Nand Lal
- Banda Singh Bahadur
- Bhai Tara Singh Wan
- Nawab Kapur Singh
- Sarbat Khalsa
- Bhagwant Singh Bangeshwar
