= Mahima Prakash =

Mahima Prakash may refer to:

- Mahima Prakash Vartak, Sikh prose work attributed to Kirpal Das Bhalla
- Mahima Prakash Kavita, Sikh verse work attributed to Sarup Das Bhalla
