= Sadhukkari =

Mixed language spoken in medieval northern India

- Panchmel Khichri
- सधुक्कड़ी
- Region: North India
- Era: Medieval period
- Language family: Indo-European: Indo-Iranian; Indo-Aryan; Sadhukkari
- Sources: Hindustani (in the form of Hindi), Braj Bhasha, Awadhi, Bhojpuri and Marwari

Language codes
- ISO 639-3: –

Sadhukkari (Devanagari: सधुक्कड़ी), also known as Sadhu Bhasha, was a vernacular dialect of medieval India, and a mix of Hindustani (in the form of Hindi), Braj Bhasha, Awadhi, Marwari and Bhojpuri, hence it is also commonly called a Panchmel Khichri. Since it is simpler, it is used in adult literacy books or early literacy books.

It finds place in the oral tradition and the writings of medieval poets and saints like Kabir and Guru Nanak. Nanak likely adopted the vernacular so his works could be more accessible to a larger audience. Poets like Kabirdas, Mirabai, Baba Farid, and Shah Latif, etc. used it in addition to local variations of Bhojpuri, Rajasthani, Punjabi and Sindhi languages.

The term "Sadhukkari" was coined by Ramchandra Shukla (1884–1941), and not all scholars agree with the use of this term, or the identity of the languages which it covers.

== See also ==
- Sant Bhasha
- Sadhu Bhasha
