= Pauri (poetry) =

Pauri are stanzas of Punjabi poetry with two to ten or occasionally more lines, mostly used in Vars. They are similar to Shabads. Pauri couplets are commonly used in heroic Punjabi poetry.
