= Sarsa River =

River in northern India

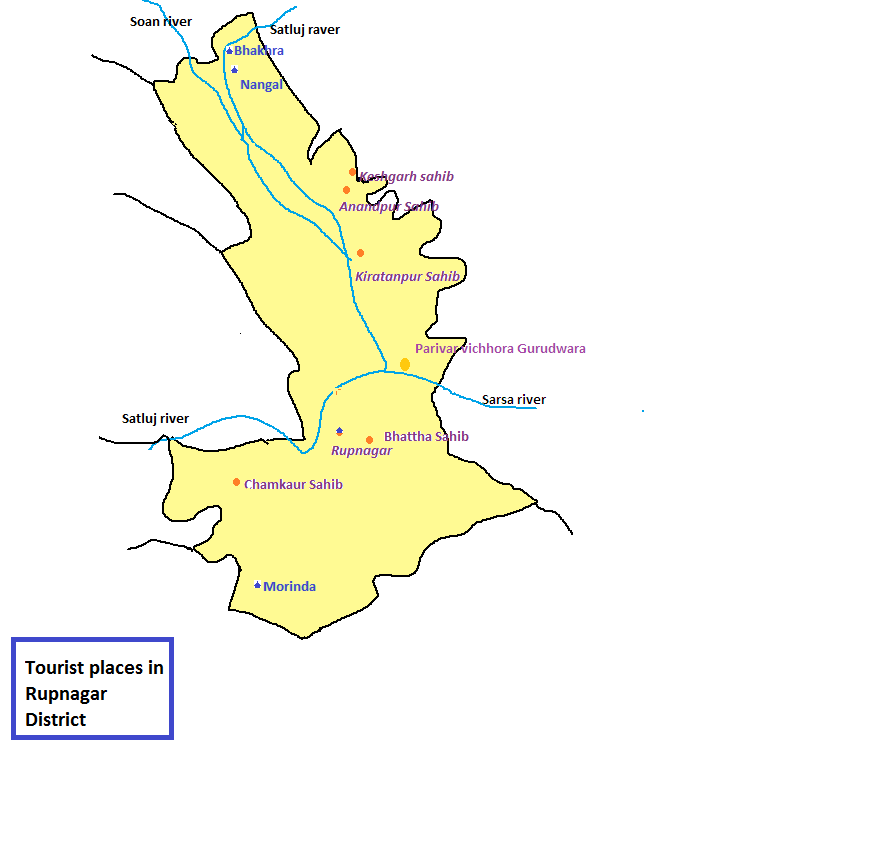
Sarsa river in Rupnagar district

Sarsa river or Sirsa river (in Punjabi ਸਰਸਾ /ਸਿਰਸਾ ਨਦੀ, in Hindi सरसा,सिरसा नदी ) is a river in north India.

== Course ==
The river rises in the Shiwalik foothills of Southern Himachal Pradesh. It flows in the western part of Solan district, then enters into Punjab near Diwari village. Sarsa joins the river Sutlej at the eastern part of Rupnagar district of Punjab. It joins the Satluj River near Taraf village.

== History ==
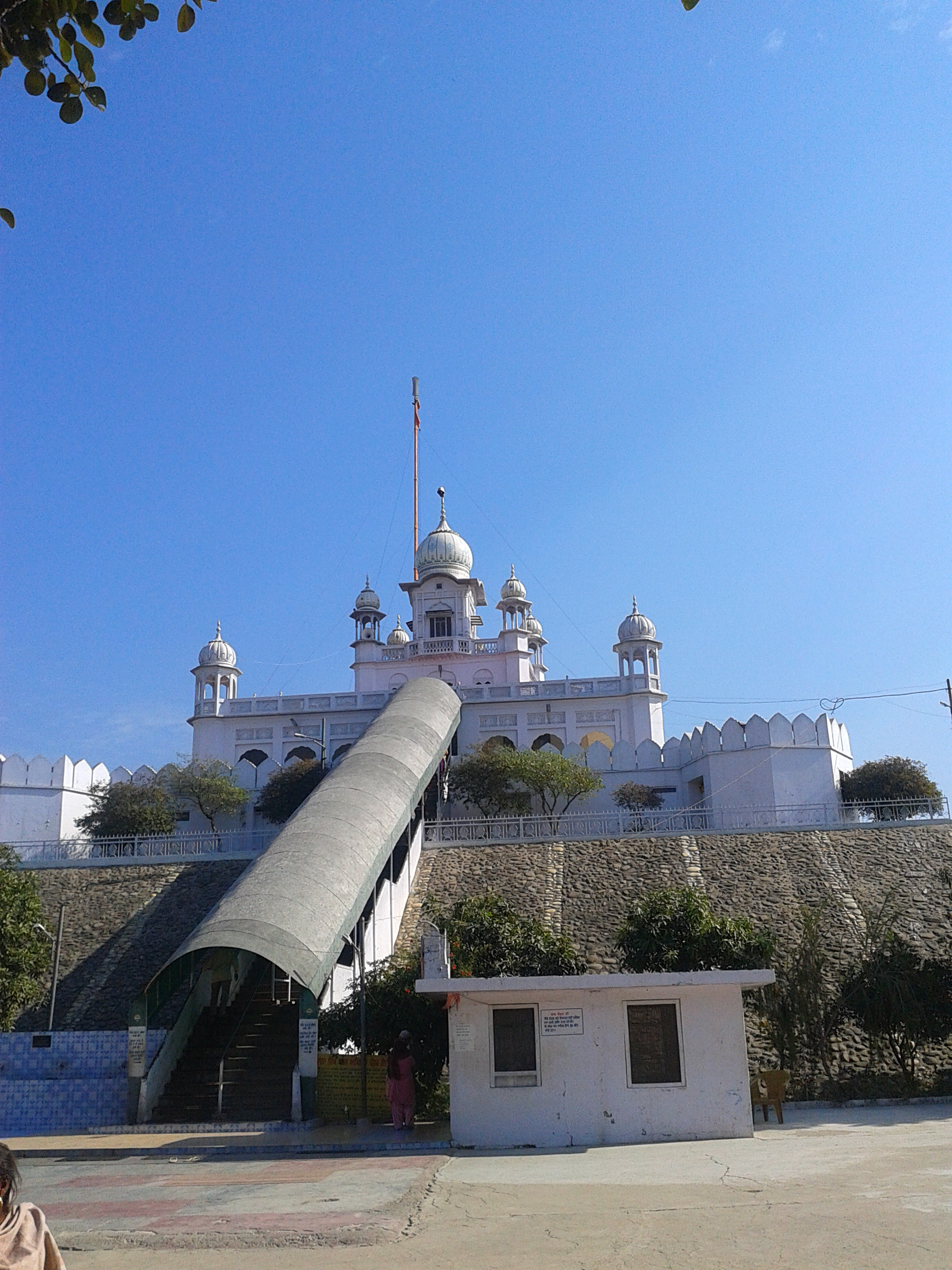
Pariwar vichhora gurudwara

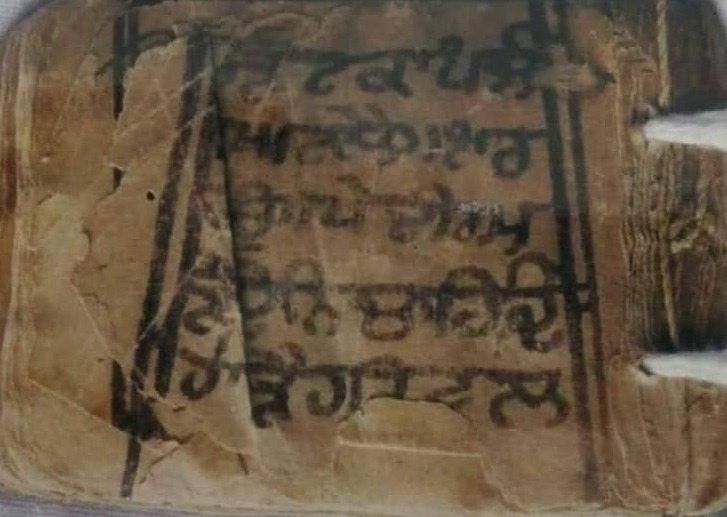
Nitnem Gutka of Guru Gobind Singh that became wet while crossing the Sarsa rivulet in December 1704 or 1705

In December 1704, the Battle of Sarsa (a part of the Mughal-Sikh Wars) was fought between Khalsa and Mughal Empire.The river was flooded that night. Guru Gobind Singh was the tenth Sikh Guru. His family separated (vichor) during this incident and were presumed to be among the dead. A large amount of literature produced by the Kavi Darbar was lost while the Sikhs crossed the Sirsa after evacuating from Anandpur in 1704.

A Gurudwara named Parivar Vichora is situated near the bank of river Sirsa in the village Majri.

== Pollution ==
Baddi, Nalagarh, Barotiwala industrial areas (in Solan district are on banks of this river. The various research reports by the Central Pollution Control Board, Himdhara (a Himachal-based watchdog) and other media reports note that industrial effluents from Baddi, Barotiwala, and Nalagarh industrial areas, including the discharge from a common effluent treatment plant, illegal dumping of garbage, and unlawful sand mining, are the chief threats to the Sirsa river. The pollution has caused great damage to the aquatic life and increased fish mortality.
