= Bhai Gurdas =

Jathedar of the Akal Takht from 1606 to 1637

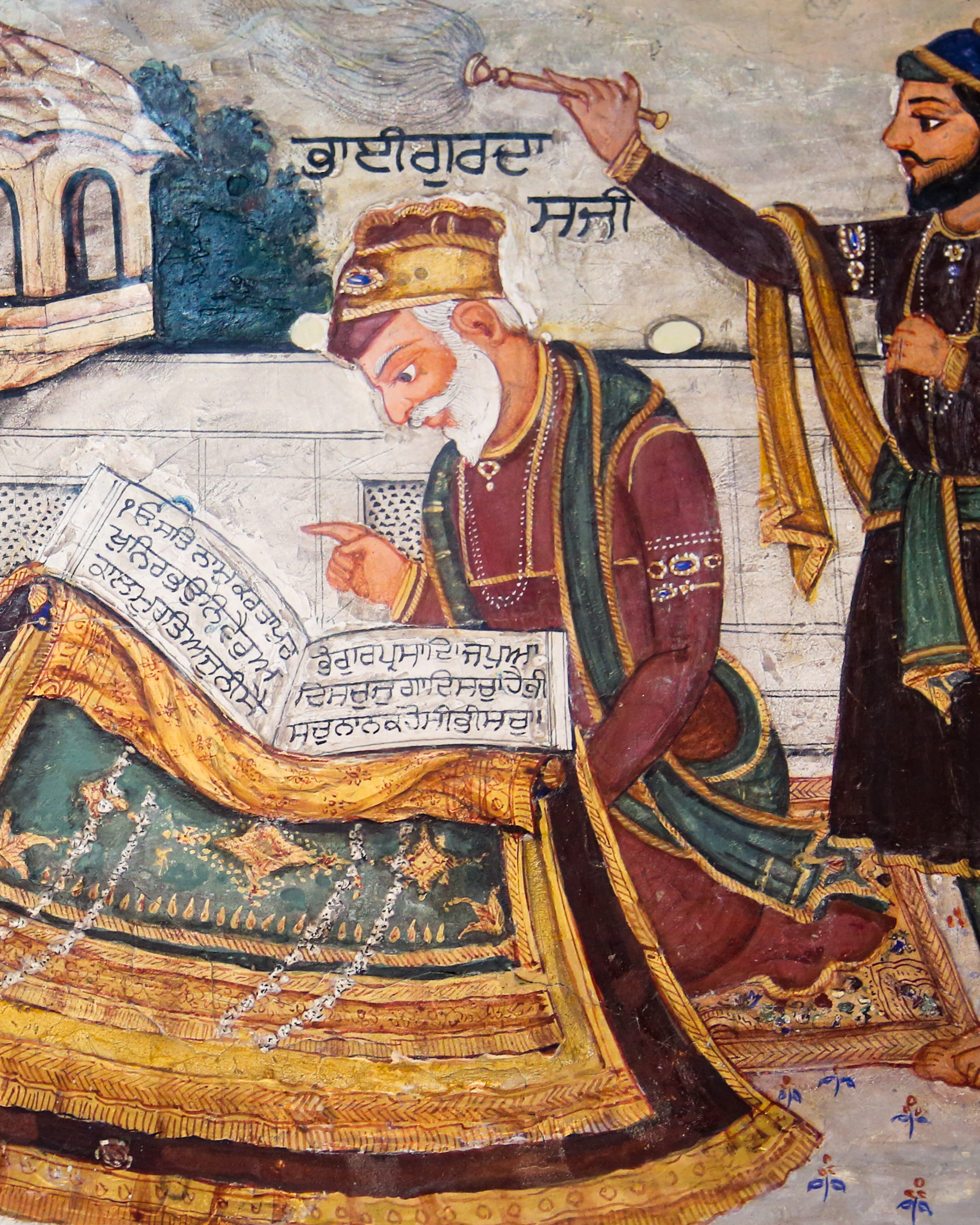
- 19th century mural painting from Gurdwara Baba Atal depicting Bhai Gurdas

Jathedar of the Akal Takht
- In office 1606 – 25 August 1636
- Preceded by: Position Established
- Succeeded by: Mani Singh

Personal details
- Born: Gurdas Bhalla; 1551 Basarke, Amritsar, Punjab
- Died: 25 August 1636 (aged 84–85) Goindwal, Tarn Taran Sahib, Punjab
- Relations: Mata Ganga (cousin)
- Parents: Ishar Das (father); Jivani (mother)
- Known for: Transcribing the first Adi Granth; Varan Bhai Gurdas

Bhai Gurdas (1551 – 25 August 1636), also known as Bhagat Mal Gurdas, was a Sikh writer, historian and preacher who served as the Jathedar of the Akal Takht from 1606 to his death in 1636. He was the original scribe of the early version of Guru Granth Sahib, having served as the amanuensis of Guru Arjan in its compilation. His exegetical works are popularly known as "the key to Guru Granth Sahib". He was part of the bhai tradition of Sikhism.

== Early life ==
Bhai Gurdas was possibly born in 1551 (Note: According to research conducted by the late Randhir Singh.) (exact year unknown but likely between 1543 and 1553 (Note: This time range for the likely year of his birth was set by Vir Singh after research he conducted trying to settle the issue of when Gurdas was born.)) at Basarke Gillan, a small village in the Punjab. (Note: Other sources give Goindwal as his place of birth.) He was the only child of Bhai Ishar Das and Mata Jivani. Gurdas' father, Ishar Das, was the youngest brother of Guru Amar Das, therefore Gurdas was the nephew of Guru Amar Das. Gurdas was born into the Bhalla clan of Khatris. Bhai Gurdas was near 3 years of age when his mother died.

After being orphaned at the age of 12, he was adopted by Guru Amar Das. Under the patronage of Guru Amar Das, Bhai Gurdas learned Sanskrit, Braj Bhasha, Persian, and Punjabi at Sultanpur Lodhi and eventually began preaching. He was further educated in both the Hindu and Muslim literary traditions. He spent his early years at Goindwal and Sultanpur Lodhi. At Goindval, Gurdas listened and obtained knowledge from scholars and swamis that continuously visited the town while traversing the Delhi-Lahore road. He later moved to Varanasi, where he studied Sanskrit and Hindu scriptures. After Guru Amar Das died, his successor Guru Ram Das, assigned Bhai Gurdas as a Sikh missionary to Agra.

== Later life ==
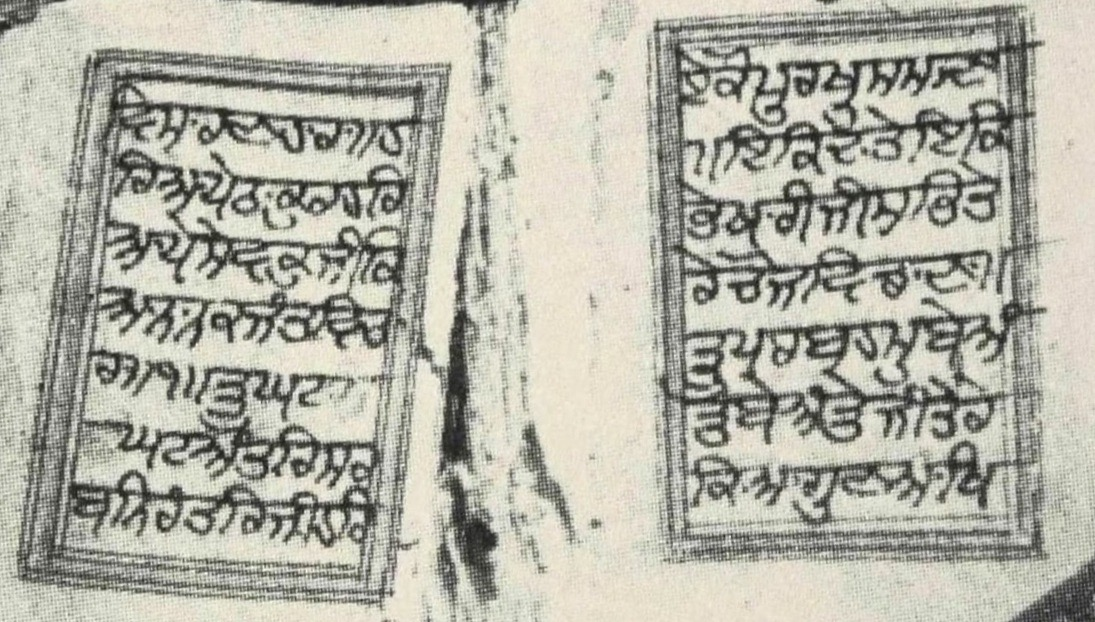
Folios of the So Purakh composition of Guru Ram Das from a Gutka Sahib manuscript claimed to have been written by Bhai Gurdas Bhalla, kept at Kartarpur Sahib

In 1577, Bhai Gurdas contributed his labour to excavating the Sarovar at Darbar Sahib. Twenty years later, he went on an expedition to East Kartarpur and recited many of the early hymns to Emperor Akbar. Akbar was impressed by their spiritual content and was satisfied they had no anti-Muslim tone.

After Guru Ram Das left the world, Bhai Gurdas formed a close relationship with the fifth Guru, Guru Arjan. The Guru had great respect for him, and regarded him as his maternal uncle ("mama"). Gurdas led a group of Sikhs to Gwalior, where the Mughal emperor Jahangir, jealous of the popularity of Sikhism, had imprisoned Guru Hargobind. After that, Gurdas was sent to Kabul, Kashmir, Rajputana, and Varanasi again to preach Sikhism. He even went to Sri Lanka, preaching the name of the Guru among the masses and showing them the true way of life.

== Literary works ==
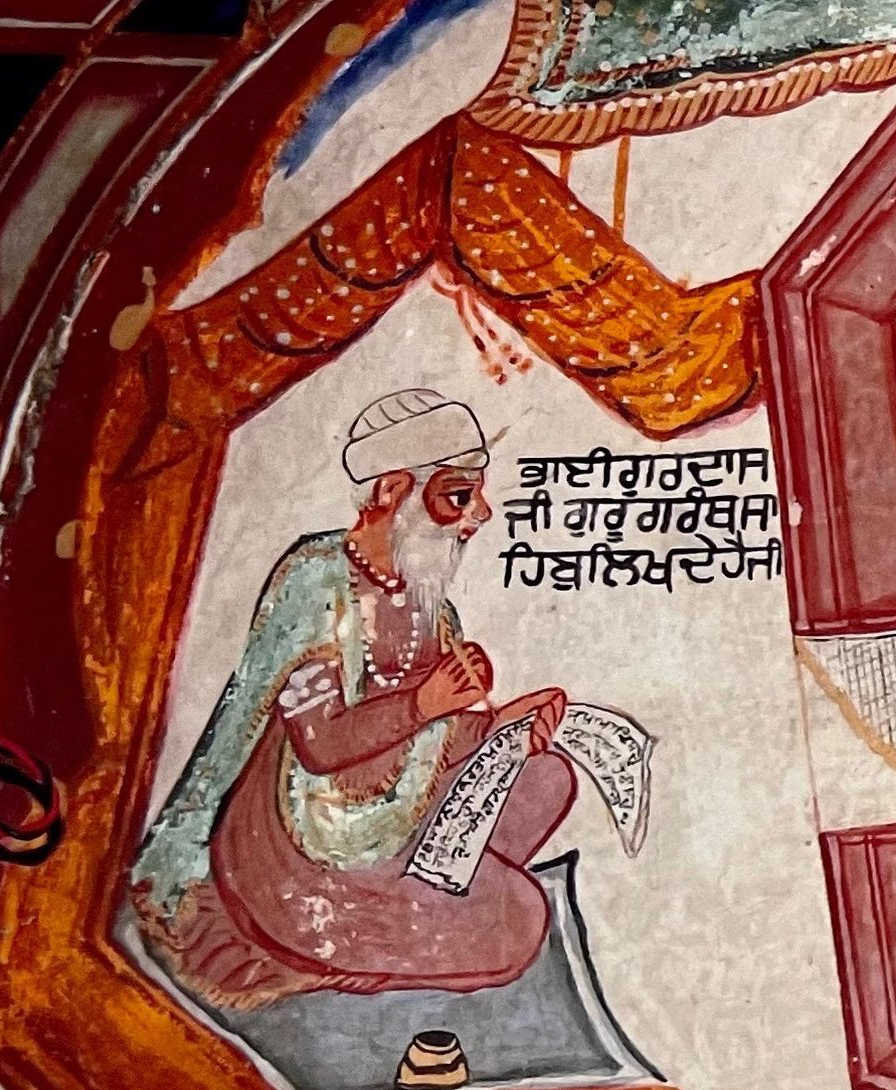
Detail of Bhai Gurdas Bhalla from a Sikh fresco, circa mid-19th century

Bhai Gurdas completed the Adi Granth in 1604. It took him nearly 19 years to scribe. He not only wrote the Adi Granth, as dictated by Guru Arjun, but also supervised four other scribes (Bhai Haria, Bhai Sant Das, Bhai Sukha and Bhai Manasa Ram) in the writing of various Sikh scriptures. His other works in Punjabi are collectively called Vaaran Bhai Gurdas. Aside from his well-known Vaars, he also wrote Kabits, a form of poetry, in the Braj-language. He was initially thought to have been the author of 556 Kabits but a discovery of 119 additional Kabits authored by Gurdas was made in 1939 by Vir Singh in a Gurmukhi manuscript.

Bhai Gurdas is one of only two authors outside of Sikh scripture whose writings are approved for recitation in Sikh worship.

=== Writings ===
- 6 Chhands of 8 Verses each in Sanskrit
- 672 Kabits and 3 Swayyas in Brij Bhasha
- 40 Vaars containing 912 Pauris in Punjabi

== Jathedar of Akal Takhat (1606–1636) ==
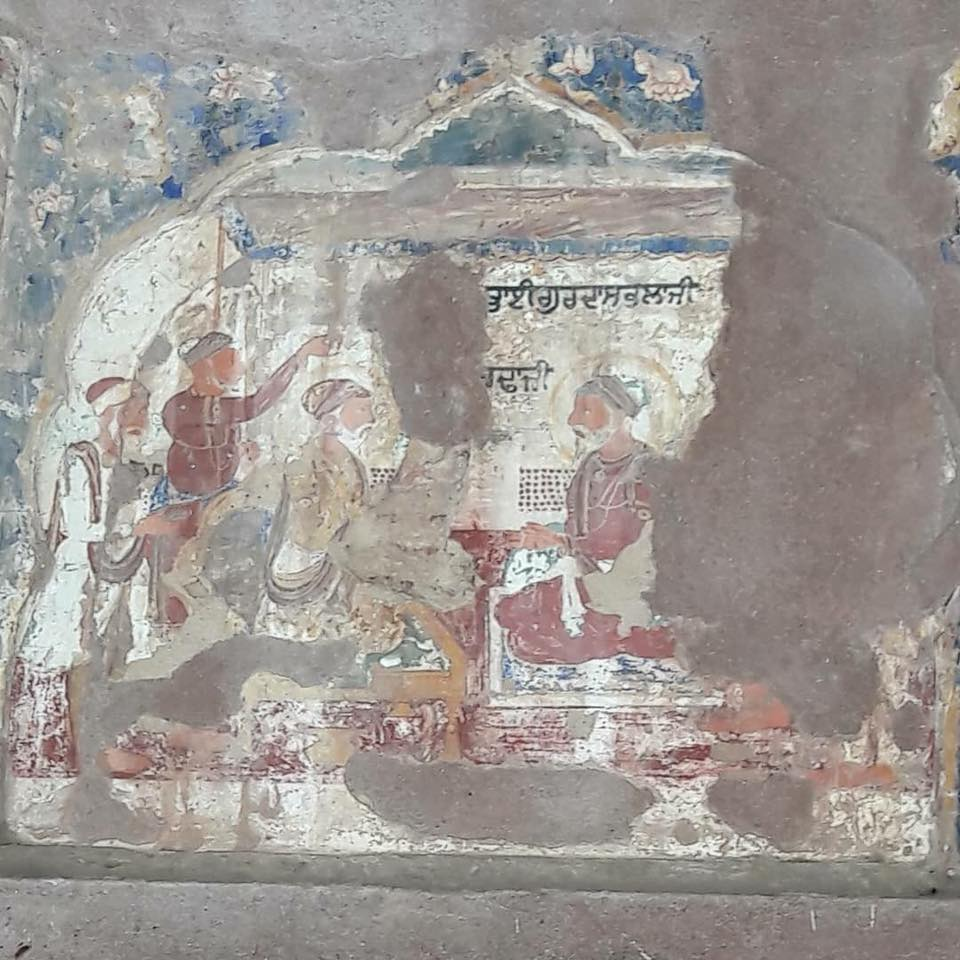
Mural showing Bhai Gurdas and Baba Buddha in conversation.

The Akal Takht was revealed by Guru Hargobind on 15 June 1606. The foundation stone of the building of the Akal Takht was laid down by Guru Hargobind himself. The rest of the structure was completed by Baba Buddha and Bhai Gurdas. No mason or any other person was permitted to participate in the construction of the structure. Guru Hargobind himself was the custodian of the Takht. On 31 December 1612, when Guru Hargobind was imprisoned at Gwalior Fort, he assigned Baba Buddha to perform the services at Harmandir Sahib and Bhai Gurdas as the first Jathedar of Akal Takht.

== Death ==
He died on 25 August 1636 at Goindwal. (Note: Other sources give his year of death as 1635.) Guru Hargobind personally performed the ceremonial service at his funeral.

=== Death year ===
The year of his death is disputed, with prevailing views on his year of death as follows:

- 1629 as per the Gurbilas Patshahi Chhevin
- 1636 as per an extant Bhatt Vahi record from the Bhatt Vahi Talauda Pargana Jind. This year of death is further corroborated in a copy of a scriptural manuscript at Gurdas' hometown of Goindwal.
- 1637 as per Vir Singh and Kahn Singh Nabha

== See also ==
- Sikh Gurus
