= Vaar =

Punjabi heroic ballad

The vār or vaar (Gurmukhi: ਵਾਰ, Shahmukhi: وار), in Punjabi poetry, is a heroic ode or ballad which generally narrates stories of Punjabi folk heroes such as Dulla Bhatti, or major historical events. The vaar has also been used to evoke the mood of devotion or sacrifice, as in Guru Gobind Singh's Chandi di Var, or to narrate the mystical experience of a pir, bhagat, or guru.

Some historical vaars include Amir Khusrau's Vaar for Ghazi Malik, the Vaar of Jasrath Khokhar, the Nadar Shah di Var describing the Gondal clan's resistance against Nadir Shah, and the Chatthian di Vaar describing the Chattha clan's fierce rivalry with the Sukerchakia Misl. The two most prominent vaars are the Chandi di Vaar (Vaar Shri Bhagauti ji ki) by Guru Gobind Singh and Najabat's vaar on Nader Shah.

== History ==
According to Harbhajan Singh, the vaar genre developed as an expression of heroism, which is one of the fundamental aspects of Punjabiyat ("Punjabi-ness"), alongside spirituality (which is expressed by religious hymns and poetry). In the past, the vaars were performed as songs of high-pitched notes, with certain set tunes known as dhunis, accompanied by music from folk instruments, such as the sarangi and dhad, being performed at gatherings. Whilst the vaar genre originated from Punjab, other parts of India developed similar traditions that celebrated heroic figures who achieved success, such as the raso of Rajasthan and Gujarat, and the pawadas of Maharashtra.

Many of the vaars from the earliest periods by mediaeval authors were lost over time, with only their dhuni (tune) being preserved in communal-memory, although the Guru Granth Sahib preserved the nomenclature of nine earlier vaars. Some of the dhunas of the earlier vaars have been re-discovered and fragments of their wording. Aside from those, there is a reference to Amir Khusrau creating a vaar in Punjabi verse based upon the battle that took place in 1320 between Ghiyath al-Din Tughluq and Khusrao Khan. Meanwhile, only sections and not the entirety of the vaars dedicated to Dulla Bhatti and Jaimal Fateh have been preserved until today. There are also the Vaars of Sikander and Ibrahim. Vaars were also composed to serve the jajmans of the Dooms, Mirasis, and the Bhiraris, reflecting Punjabi familial and tribal conflicts, serving to remember particular conflicts and aggrandizing their clients' lineage. Two common features of the vaar is the lack of shringar (love sentiment) but the presence of "chaste moral values". Although the Vaar of Musa involved romance in its plot, with the victor who obtaining the woman being fought over is not based upon victory in battle but upon the woman's choice.

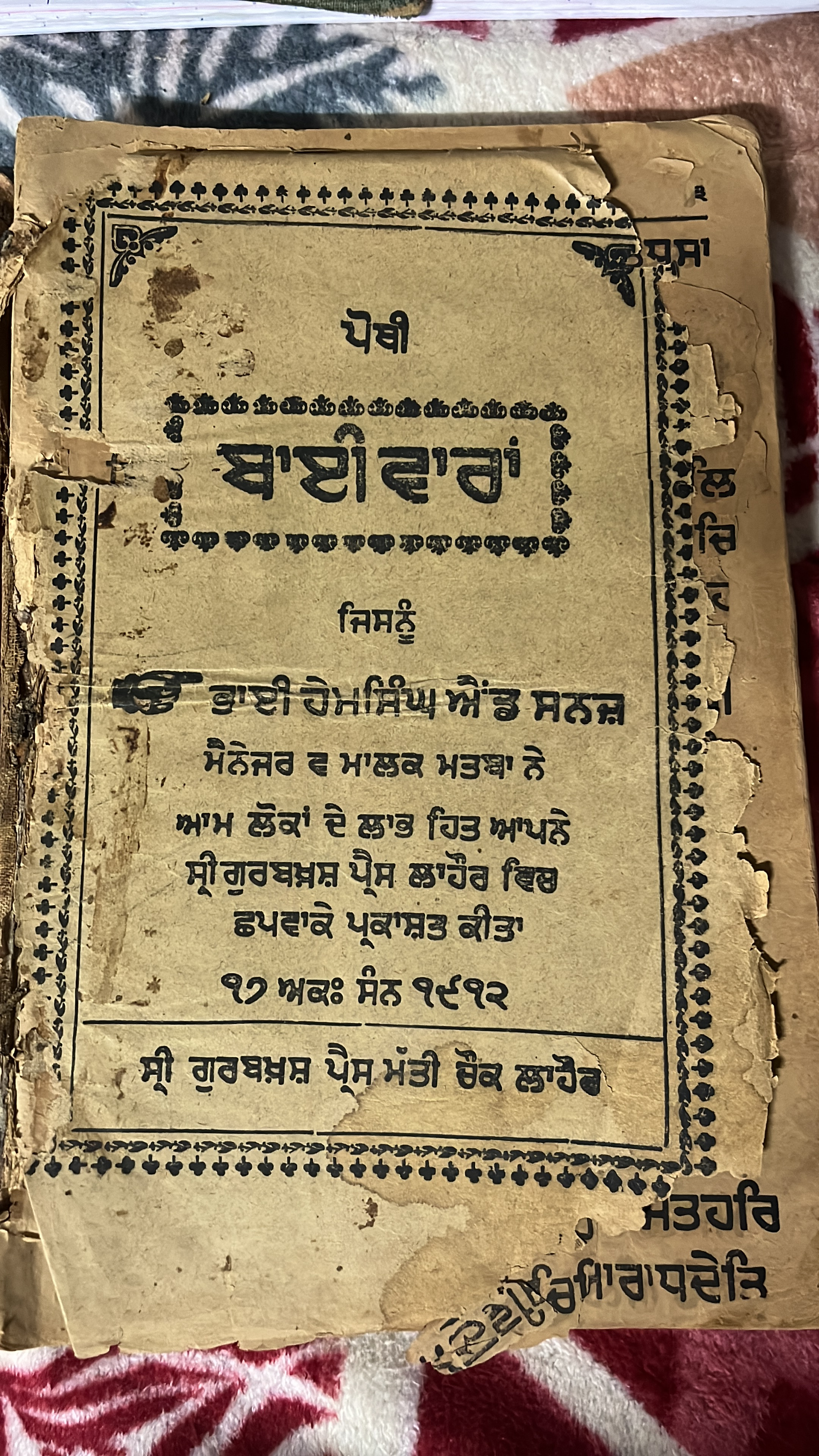
1922 book covering the Vaars found within the Guru Granth Sahib

The Sikh gurus adopted and utilized the vaar genre to express their religious teachings and beliefs. Bhai Gurdas used the genre to compose his Vaaran, which expound upon Sikh philosophy, Sikh apologetics, and offer accounts of the lives of the first five Sikh gurus. Guru Gobind Singh's Chandi di Vaar combines both spirituality and heroism in a single ballad, celebrating Durga (Chandi), in-order to motivate the Sikhs in their battles against the hostile administrations of the era by re-purposing Indic mythology. The vaar composed by Najabat on Nader Shah's invasion of Punjab and the wider region (being comparable to the Babur Bani composed by Guru Nanak) contains elements of Punjabi nationalism.

== See also ==
- Punjabi Qisse
- Punjabi folklore
- Dhadi (music)
- Raga
- Asa di Var
