= List of cultural heritage sites in Balochistan, Pakistan =

According to the Pakistan Environmental Protection Agency's report published on protected areas in 1997, Balochistan has 27 archaeological sites and monuments protected by the Federal Government. These include the province's only national monument; Ziarat Residency. Additionally it has one site on the tentative world heritage list, Mehrgarh.

Of the some 400 sites and monuments protected under the Antiquities Act 1975, the province contains seven sites in Category 1, eight in Category II and fourteen in Category III.

National monuments, UNESCO inscribed and tentative sites

== Federal Government ==
The following sites were previously protected under the Federal Government.

ID	Name	Type	Location	District	Coordinates	Image
BA-1	Pirak mound		Village Kolachi — located 17 kilometres (11 mi) south of Sibi on the right side of the road to Jacobabad	Sibi District		Pirak mound More images Upload Photo
BA-2	Nindo Damb		Ornach Valley, Tehsil Wadh	Killa Abdullah District		Tunnel, Chaman&categories= Upload Photo Tunnel, Chaman&categories= Upload Photo
BA-3	Fort wall of Jhalawar		Jhalawar	Kharan District		Upload Photo Upload Photo
BA-4	Fort of Azad Khan (Kharan Fort)		Kharan town	Kharan		Fort of Azad Khan (Kharan Fort) More images Upload Photo
BA-5	Pally Kalat		Washbohi	Kharan		Pally Kalat More images Upload Photo
BA-6	Nauroze Fort		Nauroze	Kharan		Upload Photo Upload Photo
BA-7	Ancient tomb		Jhalawar	Kharan		Ancient tomb More images Upload Photo
BA-8	Har-o-Goke		Garuk	Kharan		Upload Photo Upload Photo
BA-9	Bara Bagh Cemetery, Lasbela		Babrs	Lasbela District		Bara Bagh Cemetery, Lasbela More images Upload Photo
BA-10	Tomb of General Muhammad Ibn-e-Haroon		Bela town	Lasbela		Upload Photo Upload Photo
BA-11	Tombs at Hinidan		Pir Mubarakm	Lasbela		Tombs at Hinidan More images Upload Photo
BA-12	Chowkhundi (Rumi) graves		Bhawani Sarai, 5 miles from Hub Chowki	Lasbela		Chowkhundi (Rumi) graves More images Upload Photo
BA-13	Tordheri site		Tordheri	Loralai District		Upload Photo Upload Photo
BA-14	High mound		Dabarkot	Loralai		Upload Photo Upload Photo
BA-15	Prehistoric mound		Harian Haider Zai	Loralai		Prehistoric mound More images Upload Photo
BA-16	Damb Judeir or Judeir-jo-daro		Deh Jodher No. 2 between Jhatpat and Dera Murad Jamali	Nasirabad District		Upload Photo Upload Photo
BA-17	Mound No. 1 in Killi Gul Muhammad		Village Kotwal — located 3 kilometres (1.9 mi) northwest of Quetta city on the left side of the road to Chaman	Quetta District		Upload Photo Upload Photo
BA-18	Mound No. 2		Village Samangali, west side of Airport	Quetta		Upload Photo Upload Photo
BA-19	Mound No. 3 in Damb Sadat		Located 13 kilometres (8.1 mi)southwest from Quetta city	Quetta		Upload Photo Upload Photo
BA-20	Mound No. 5 in Ahmad Khanzai		Located 5 kilometres (3.1 mi) south of Quetta	Quetta		Upload Photo Upload Photo
BA-21	Mound No. 6		Shahi Khan, near Pir Ballo on Sariab Road	Quetta		Upload Photo Upload Photo
BA-22	Mound No. 7		Kachlak on Chaman Road	Quetta		Upload Photo Upload Photo
BA-23	Mound No. 8		Village Samali (Dosak-i-Khasyan)	Quetta		Upload Photo Upload Photo
BA-24	Mound No. 9		Village Metar Zai	Quetta		Upload Photo Upload Photo
BA-25	Mound No. 10		Shaikh Manda on Chaman Road	Quetta		Mound No. 10 More images Upload Photo
BA-26	Mound No. 11		Village Vauhisar	Quetta		Upload Photo Upload Photo
BA-27	Quaid-i-Azam Residency Building		Ziarat	Ziarat District		Quaid-i-Azam Residency Building More images Upload Photo
BA-28	Archaeological Site of Mehrgarh		Dhadar - located 18 kilometres (11 mi) southeast of Dhadar Town on the right bank of Bolan River	Bolan District		Archaeological Site of Mehrgarh More images Upload Photo

== Unprotected sites and heritage ==
ID	Name	Type	Location	District	Coordinates	Image
BA-U-1	Bangi Ismail's tomb (1468)			Gwadar		Upload Photo Upload Photo
BA-U-2	Jiwani graves c1400 AD		Jiwani	Gwadar		Jiwani graves c1400 AD More images Upload Photo
BA-U-3	Pasni graves c1400 AD		Pasni	Gwadar		Upload Photo Upload Photo
BA-U-4	Sohbatpur Mosque (1940)			Jaffarabad		Upload Photo Upload Photo
BA-U-5	Kalatuk (Fort) c 1700 AD			Kech		Kalatuk (Fort) c 1700 AD More images Upload Photo
BA-U-6	Miri Qila (Miri Fort)			Kech		Miri Qila (Miri Fort) More images Upload Photo
BA-U-7	Nikoderian Tombs		in Mashkel, Nag and Panjgur	Kharan & Panjgur		Upload Photo Upload Photo
BA-U-8	Khawaja Amran Shrine		Near Gulistan	Killa Abdullah		Upload Photo Upload Photo
BA-U-9	Spin Ghundi Mound		Close to Habibzai Village at the foot of an offshoot of the Khawaja Amran Range	Killa Abdullah		Upload Photo Upload Photo
BA-U-10	Gondrani (or Gundriani)			Lasbela		Gondrani (or Gundriani) More images Upload Photo
BA-U-11	Shah Bilawal's Shrine			Khuzdar		Upload Photo Upload Photo
BA-U-12	Jamia Mosque c1838		Bela	Lasbela		Upload Photo Upload Photo
BA-U-13	Lahut-i-Lamakan (cave)			Khuzdar		Lahut-i-Lamakan (cave) More images Upload Photo
BA-U-14	Kumb Shrine			Lasbela		Upload Photo Upload Photo
BA-U-15	Shireen and Farhad (shrine)			Lasbela		Shireen and Farhad (shrine) More images Upload Photo
BA-U-16	Sassi and Punnu (shrine)		Mouza Mumbar, Tehsil Sonmiani	Lasbela		Upload Photo Upload Photo
BA-U-17	Pir Fida Hussain's shrine			Lasbela		Upload Photo Upload Photo
BA-U-18	Pir Moosiani's shrine			Lasbela		Upload Photo Upload Photo
BA-U-19	Pir Mohiddin's shrine			Lasbela		Upload Photo Upload Photo
BA-U-20	Mai Gondrani's shrine			Lasbela		Upload Photo Upload Photo
BA-U-21	Shahi Jamia Mosque		Bela	Lasbela		Upload Photo Upload Photo
BA-U-22	Sir Robert Sandeman's tomb		Bela	Lasbela		Upload Photo Upload Photo
BA-U-23	Karia Pir's shrine		Bela	Lasbela		Upload Photo Upload Photo
BA-U-24	Sassi's spring			Lasbela		Upload Photo Upload Photo
BA-U-25	Chinjan		68 km southwest of Loralai	Loralai		Chinjan More images Upload Photo
BA-U-26	Daber Kot		18km northeast of Duki Town	Loralai		Upload Photo Upload Photo
BA-U-27	Mughal Qila (Mughal Fort) – c 1500AD			Loralai		Mughal Qila (Mughal Fort) – c 1500AD More images Upload Photo
BA-U-28	Rana Ghundai			Loralai		Rana Ghundai More images Upload Photo
BA-U-29	Surjangal		8km northeast of Sinjawi Town, Baghave Valley on road to Duki.	Loralai		Surjangal More images Upload Photo
BA-U-30	Torghar — caves and rock shelters with paintings		Sulaiman Range	Musakhel		Upload Photo Upload Photo
BA-U-31	Zuncari Village — rock shelters		Sulaiman Range	Musakhel		Zuncari Village — rock shelters More images Upload Photo
BA-U-32	Sara Qila (Sara Fort)			Pishin		Upload Photo Upload Photo
BA-U-33	Governor's House			Quetta		Governor's House More images Upload Photo
BA-U-34	Balochistan Secretariate building		Quetta	Quetta		Upload Photo Upload Photo
BA-U-35	Quetta railway station		Quetta	Quetta		Quetta railway station More images Upload Photo
BA-U-36	General Post Office and Central Telegraph Office building		Quetta	Quetta		Upload Photo Upload Photo
BA-U-37	Sessions Courts building		Quetta	Quetta		Sessions Courts building More images Upload Photo
BA-U-38	Balochistan High Court building		Quetta	Quetta		Balochistan High Court building More images Upload Photo
BA-U-39	Frontier Corps Headquarters		Quetta	Quetta		Upload Photo Upload Photo
BA-U-40	Pakistan Command and Staff College (main building)		Quetta	Quetta		Pakistan Command and Staff College (main building) More images Upload Photo
BA-U-41	Babar/Khosti - 10 rock shelters		Sulaiman Range	Zhob		Upload Photo Upload Photo
BA-U-42	Badanzai		Bronze Age	Zhob		Upload Photo Upload Photo
BA-U-43	Dhana Abdullahzai - 1 rock shelter - 1st time with wild boar		Sulaiman Range	Zhob		Upload Photo Upload Photo
BA-U-44	Hazrat Nazar Nika's Shrine		6 km from Zhob	Zhob		Upload Photo Upload Photo
BA-U-45	Hazrat Khostu Baba's shrine		100 km from Zhob towards Waziristan	Zhob		Upload Photo Upload Photo
BA-U-46	Ismailzai			Zhob		Upload Photo Upload Photo
BA-U-47	Lakaha Band - 4 rock shelters		Sulaiman Range	Zhob		Upload Photo Upload Photo
BA-U-48	Leaoha Ghozai - 5 caves and 6 rock shelters		Sulaiman Range	Zhob		Upload Photo Upload Photo
BA-U-49	Mughal Ghundai			Zhob		Upload Photo Upload Photo
BA-U-50	Musazai			Zhob		Upload Photo Upload Photo
BA-U-51	Palwan Baba's shrine		Mughalkot area	Zhob		Upload Photo Upload Photo
BA-U-52	Paryan-o-Ghundi (or Periano Ghundai) (destroyed)		2 miles west of Zhob	Zhob		Upload Photo Upload Photo
BA-U-53	Qais Rashid's tomb		top of Suleman Mountain	Zhob		Upload Photo Upload Photo
BA-U-54	Zakoo Nika's shrine		near Zhob	Zhob		Upload Photo Upload Photo
BA-U-55	Walli Tangi waterfall		Quetta	Quetta		Walli Tangi waterfall More images Upload Photo
BA-U-56	Khojak Tunnel		near Pak-Afghan border at Chamman	Killa Abdullah		Khojak Tunnel More images Upload Photo
BA-U-57	Hinglaj Mata (Rani ki Mandir)		Hinglaj	Lasbela		Hinglaj Mata (Rani ki Mandir) More images Upload Photo
BA-U-58	Lakho Pir		Near Bareja, 3 Kilometer from Khuzdar-Shahdadkot Highway	Jhal Magsi		Upload Photo Upload Photo
BA-U-59	Shahli Tomb (Shrine)		Usta Muhammad, 2 Kilometer from Faizabad Usta Muhammad Road	Jaffarabad		Upload Photo Upload Photo
BA-U-60	Gadahi Tomb (Shrine)		Usta Muhammad, 3 Kilometer from Faizabad-Usta Muhammad Road	Jaffarabad		Upload Photo Upload Photo
BA-U-61	Suhryani Tomb (Shrine)		Usta Muhammad, 5 Kilometer from Faizabad-Usta Muhammad Road	Jaffarabad		Upload Photo Upload Photo
