= List of archaeological sites in Pakistan =

Pakistan is home to many archaeological sites dating from Lower Paleolithic period to Mughal Empire. The earliest known archaeological findings belong to the Soanian culture from the Soan Valley, near modern-day Islamabad. Soan Valley culture is considered as the best known Palaeolithic culture of Central Asia. Mehrgarh in Balochistan is one of the most important Neolithic sites dating from 7000 BCE to 2000 BCE. The Mehrgarh culture was amongst the first culture in the world to establish agriculture and livestock and live in villages. Mehrgarh civilization lasted for 5000 years till 2000 BCE after which people migrated to other areas, possibly Harappa and Mohenjo-daro. Harappa and Mohenjo-daro are the best known sites from the Indus Valley civilization (c 2500 - 1900 BCE).

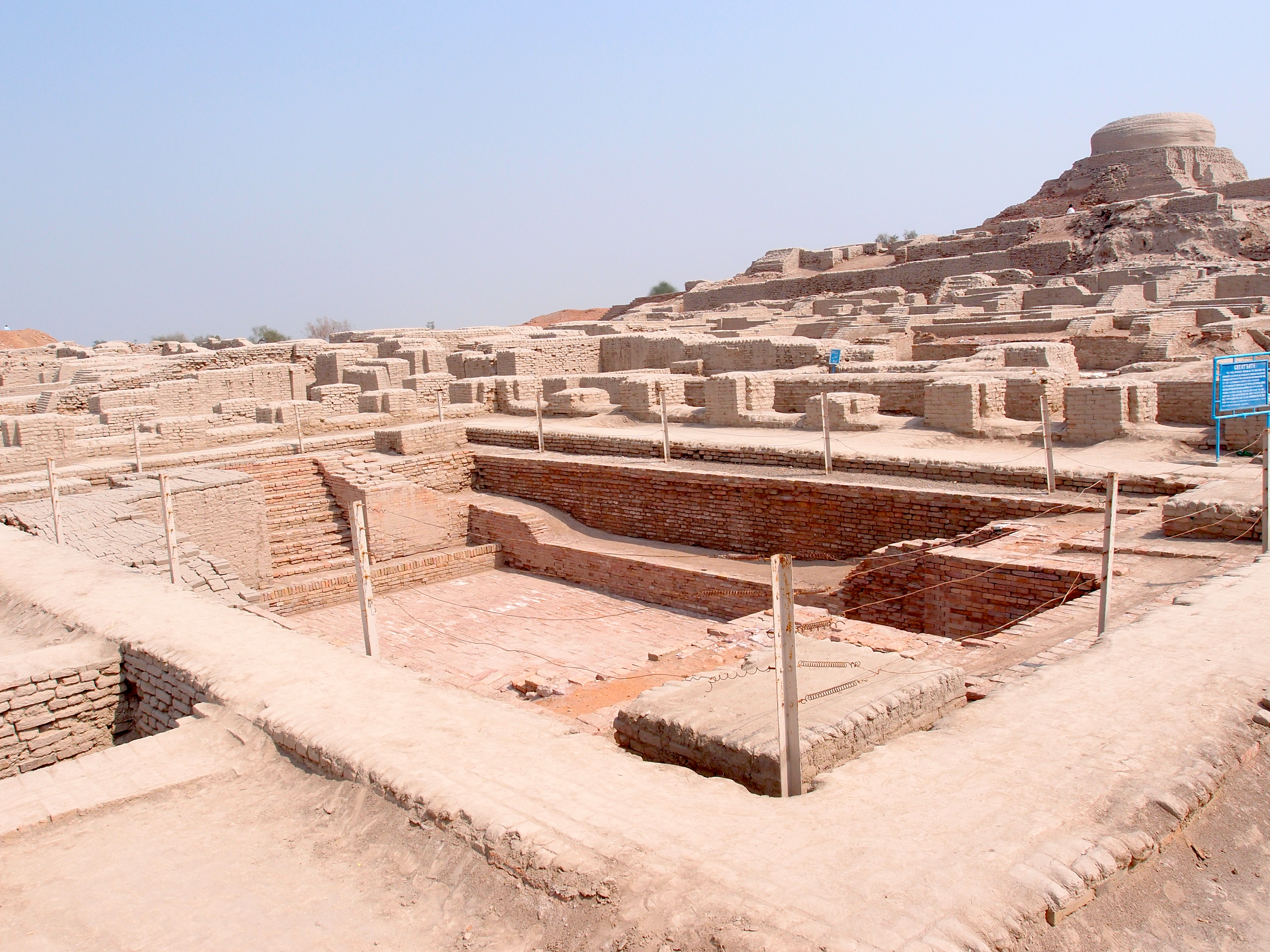
Archaeological ruins at Mohenjo-daro, Sindh, Pakistan

== Stone Age ==
=== Lower Paleolithic (Pre-Soanian) ===
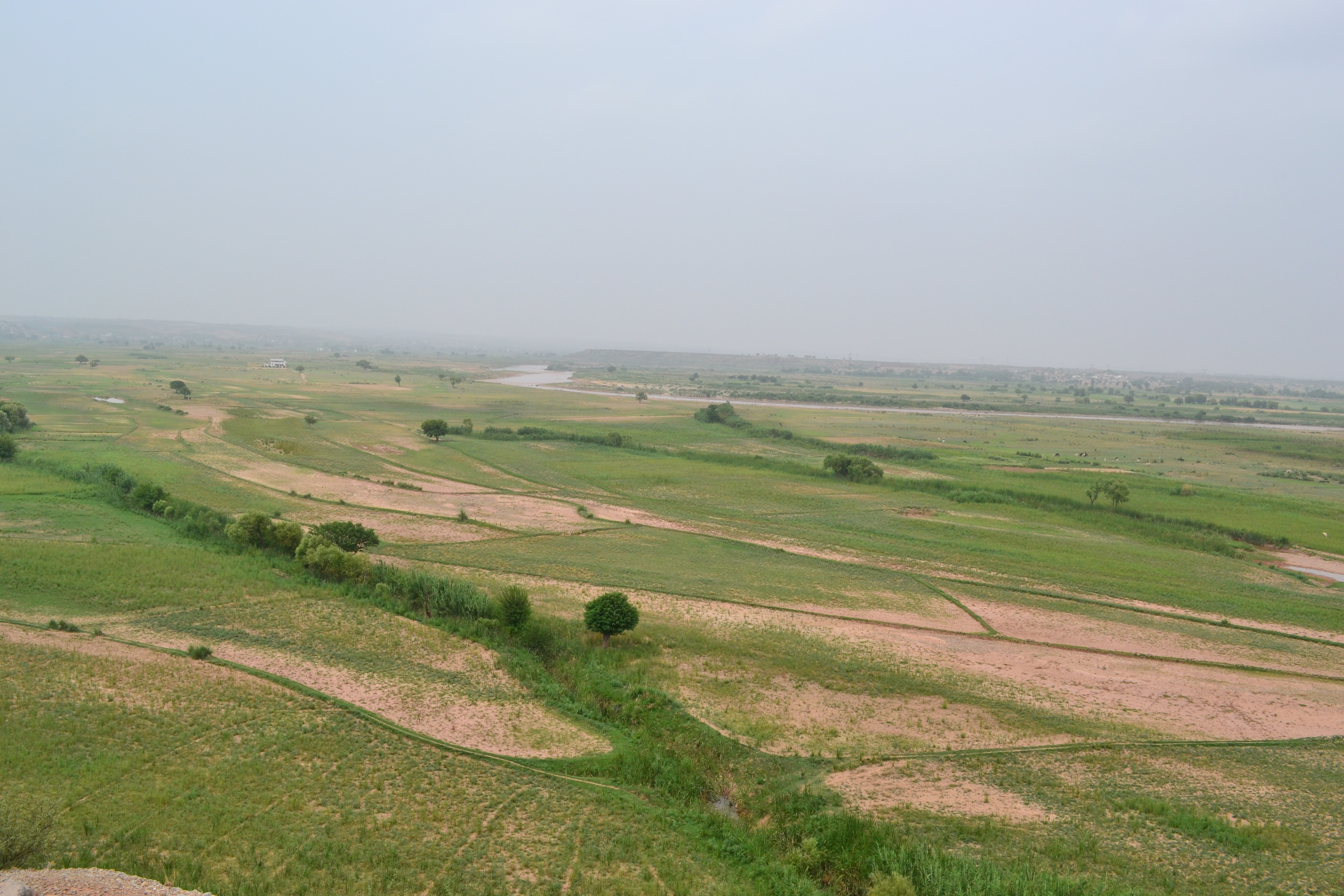
View of Soan valley and Soan River in background, near Adiala

Pre-Soanian culture in Pakistan corresponds to Oldowan culture dating back to the Mindel glaciation. Some findings in Punjab belong to this period.

=== Lower to Middle Paleolithic (Soanian) ===
Early Soanian sites correspond to the Acheulean period. Different stone artifacts have been discovered from these sites from all over Pakistan. Sites in Soan Valley and Potohar Plateau from this period include;

- Adiala
- Chauntra
- Ghariala
- Riwat
- Balawal
- Chak Sighu
- Chakri
- Rawalpindi
- Morgah
- Dina
- Jalalpur Sharif

=== Neolithic ===
Mehrgarh (c. 7000 BCE - 2000 BCE), from Neolithic age, in Balochistan is one of the earliest sites with evidence of agriculture and village structure.

Ghaggar-Hakra (c. 6000 BCE) Artifacts Found in Hakra Civilization also date back to the same period of Mehrgarh.

Pre Harappa

Pre-Harappan farming communities date back to Neolithic time which ultimately evolved into urban Harappan civilization. Explorations and archaeological findings establish the dateline of Pre-Harappan culture from 2700 BC to 2100 BC followed by Harappan period from 2100 BC onwards. Some of the regions showing pre-Harappan culture include;

- Pirak where the culture later advanced into Indus Valley Civilization.
- Bolan
- Kachi
- Sheri Khan Tarakai is a Neolithic village and second oldest farming settlement in South Asia.
- Lewan
- Akra
- Kili Gul Muhammad
- Amri-Nal
- Kulli
- Kot Diji

== Bronze Age ==
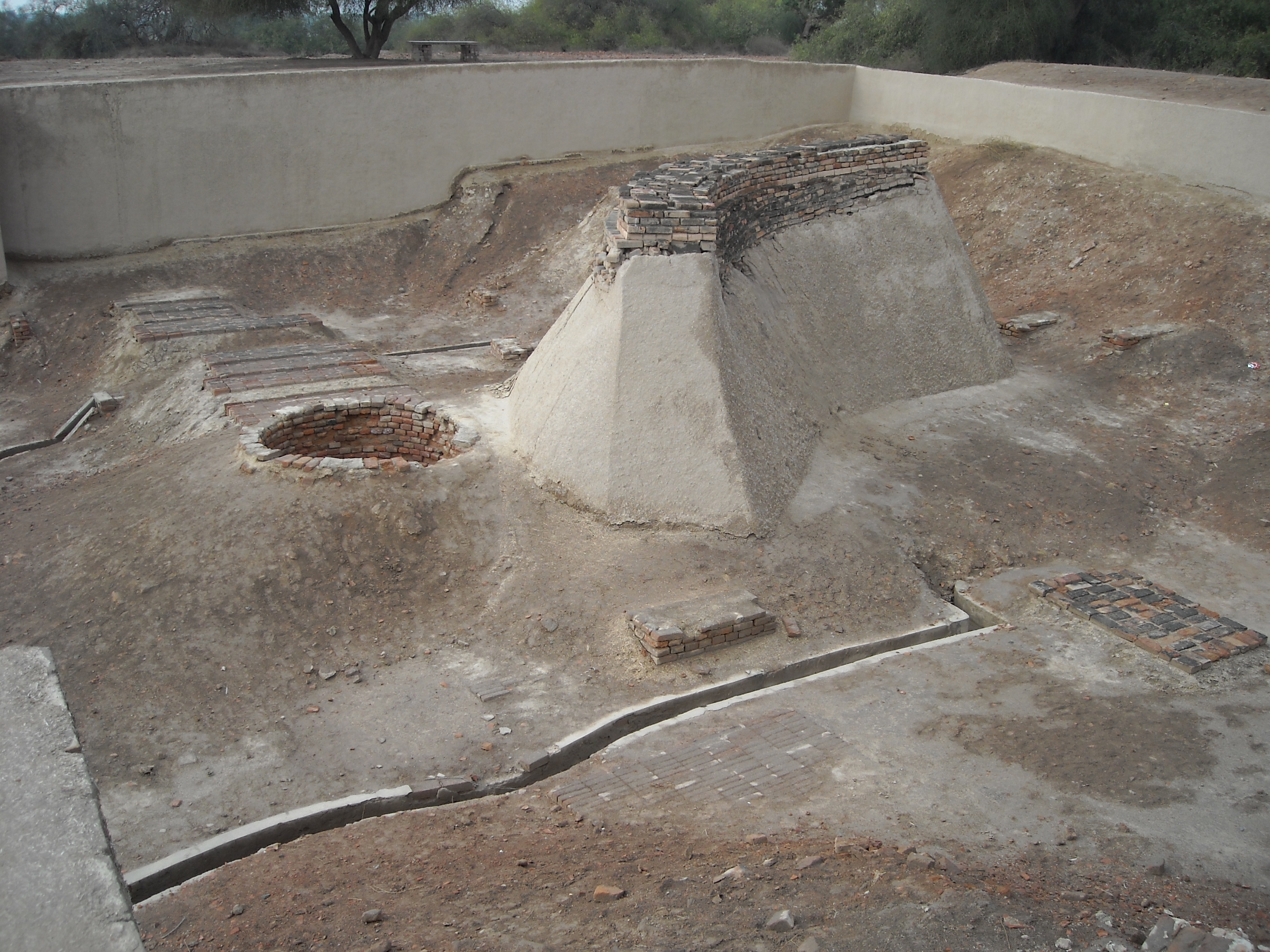
A large well and bathing platforms from Harappa occupation, Punjab, Pakistan

Early Harappan

- Harrappa
- Rehman Dheri - 4000 BCE
- Amri - 3600 to 3300 BCE
- Nausharo
- Rana Ghundai
- Sur Jangal

Indus Valley civilization

- Mohenjo-daro in Sindh
- Ganweriwal in Punjab
- Dabar Kot
- Periano Ghundai
- Chanhudaro in Sindh
- Lakhueen-jo-daro
- Sutkagan Dor

== Iron Age ==
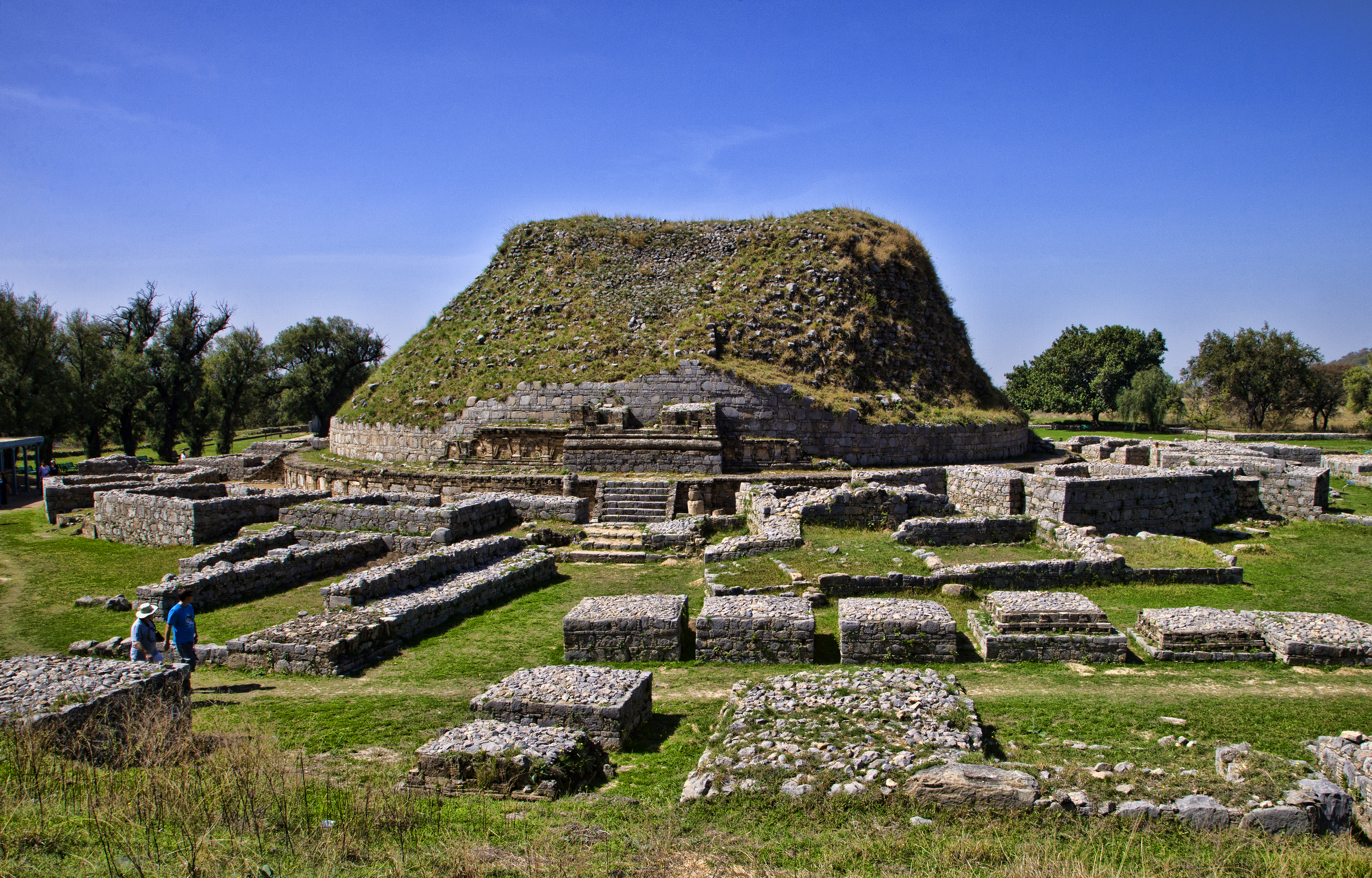
Dharmarajika stupa at Taxila ruins

- Takht-i-Bahi in Khyber Pakhtunkhwa
- Seri Bahlol in Khyber Pakhtunkhwa
- Akra in Khyber Pakhtunkhwa
- Taxila in Punjab
- Mankiala in Punjab
- Thatta in Sindh
- Meluhha in Sindh

== Middle Ages ==
=== Classical age ===
- Gandhara and its capital Pushkalavati
- Pattala

=== Late medieval age ===
- Sagala

== Islamic era ==
Islamic influence in the region started as early as 7th Century.

- Ali Masjid
- Jamia Mosque (Khudabad)
- Mansura, Sindh
- Debal

== See also ==
- List of World Heritage Sites in Pakistan
- Hindu and Buddhist architectural heritage of Pakistan
- List of monuments in Pakistan
- Tourism in Pakistan
