= Steek (Sikh literature) =

Sikh exegetical literature

Steek/Teeka
- Folio of a manuscript containing a commentary to the Guru Granth Sahib collected by Ernst Trumpp, Bavarian State Library (BSB Cod.panj. 4), 1871

A steek or teeka (other spellings may exist such as stik or tika) (Gurmukhi: ਸਟੀਕ, romanized: steek; 'Exegesis') is an exegesis or commentary on a Sikh religious text, usually Gurbani, but can also include other writings like the ghazals of Bhai Nand Lal. An author of a steek or teeka is known as a teekakar (Gurmukhi: ਟੀਕਾਕਾਰ). A steek always includes an explanation, or viakhya (Gurmukhi: ਵ੍ਯਾਖ੍ਯਾ) of the specific religious text, but depending on the complexity of the steek, it can also include footnotes, commentary, and contexts to the specific verses and where they were first written/revealed (known as an "Uthanka" [Gurmukhi: ਉਥਾਨਕਾ]).

There are different characteristics and variations between steeks. Traditional Sikh commentaries on Sikh scripture are known as a Sampardai Steek/Teeka (Gurmukhi: ਸੰਪ੍ਰਦਾਈ ਟੀਕਾ/ਸਟੀਕ) and usually includes more detailed exegesis of Sikh Scripture.

== Etymology ==
According to the Mahan Kosh, the word steek (ਸਟੀਕ) means "text with annotations, with the original text explanation," whereas the word teeka (ਟੀਕਾ) means "commentary on a granth (book), exegesis, 'read aloud with annotations.'" Both words can trace their etymology to the Sanskrit language. A steek is typically a simpler translation of the text in question, whereas a teeka is typically held to be a more complex and in-depth exegesis of the religious text.

== Categorization ==
There are four major types of Sikh scriptural interpretation techniques, they are as follows:

- Teeka: commentary providing the meaning of a particular hymn or composition in layman's terms. This technique is common amongst Sikh scholars.
- Viakhia: extended commentary on a shabad. This is the basic mode of scriptural exegesis performed at Sikh gurdwaras or deras.
- Bhashya or bhash: an explanation of difficult words found in a text by the writer.
- Paramarth: a glossary or "word-meanings", providing spiritual meanings of mystic and religious terms found in the scripture.

== History ==
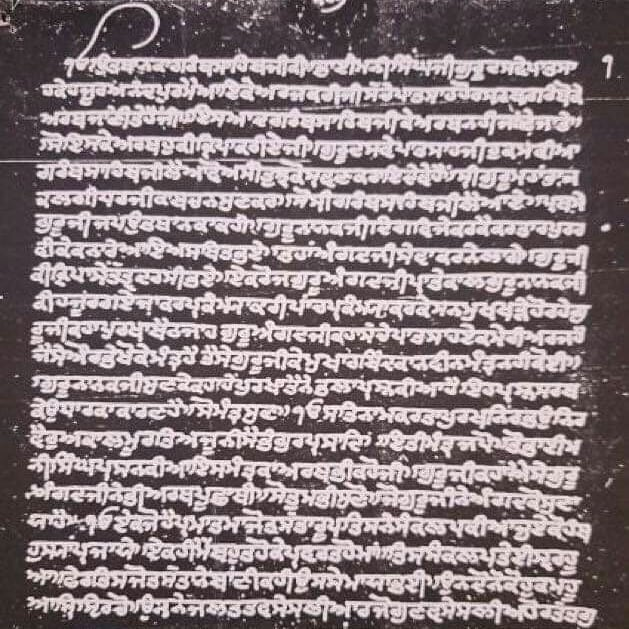
Folio of handwritten teeka (exegesis) of the Japji Sahib composition, attributed to Bhai Mani Singh

Sikh exegesis can be traced back to the period of the Sikh gurus. It was further developed by sects and traditions like the Bhais, Gurus (Sahaj school), Udasis, Minas (Parmarath school), Nirmalas, and Gianis. The writings of Bhai Gurdas are considered to be the first exegeses of Sikh literature, and Bhai Gurdas is considered to be the first Sikh exegete (during the Guru Period). His vaars provide in-depth commentary on Sikh theology. Later, in 1706, after the Battle of Muktsar, the army of Guru Gobind Singh camped at Sabo Ki Talwandi, today known as Takht Sri Damdamā Sahib. That year, for nine months, Guru Gobind Singh performed oral exegesis of the Guru Granth Sahib, and this vidya is said to have been passed down the Sikh Sampardai. In this way, traditional Sikh schools of thought (sampardai) are said to have received their knowledge and interpretations of scriptural canon from the pranali (lineage of knowledge). There is also contemporary exegesis literature from the period that can be referenced today, such as the works of Bhai Mani Singh, which are often cited as sources for steeks.

An early sample are three glossary manuscripts known as Paryaye that are preserved in the Bavarian State Library in Munich. These manuscripts were collected by Ernest Trumpp during his time at Lahore in 1871. By the late 19th century, The Giani tradition had grown influential, however traditional exegetical sects and traditions were mostly surmounted in paramounce by the Singh Sabhaists. These reformist Sikhs introduced Western-influenced exegetical works, utilizing scientific approaches toward grammar, poetry, interpretation, and social praxis. Notable exegetes from this academic approach include Vir Singh, Jodh Singh, Narain Singh, Bawa Harkrishan Singh, Bhagat Lakshman Singh, Teja Singh, and Sahib Singh. While most of these Singh Sabhaist exegetes bear influence from the earlier Giani tradition, Sahib Singh's works are free from their influence, demarcating a newer approach.

== List of major Teekas and Steeks ==
=== Faridkot Teeka ===
When Western scholar Ernest Trumpp began to draft his English translation of the entire Sikh scripture, the Guru Granth Sahib, his approach earned him the disdain of many Sikhs. Following the publication of Trumpp's work in 1877, Raja Bikram Singh, ruler of Faridkot (1842–98) and patron of the Amritsar Khalsa Diwan, commissioned a full-scale commentary on the Guru Granth Sahib. The revision was completed during the time of Raja Bikram Singh, but he did not live long enough to see publication of the work he had sponsored. Four volumes of exegetical literature were later published (three volumes between 1905–06 and the fourth several years later), collectively known as the Faridkot Teeka, due to its place of origin and exegetical nature. To this day, the Faridkot Teeka is held in high regard by many Sikhs, although many modern Sikh scholars and theologians have raised objections against the teeka, due to its Brahmanical and Vedantic leanings in explaining Sikh Theology. Collectively, the teeka is over 4,000 pages of literature and includes (at times) multiple arths [ਅਰਥ] (meanings) and uthankas for the various shabads (hymns) within the Guru Granth Sahib.

=== Shabadarath Sri Guru Granth Sahib Ji ===
This commentary was published between 1936 and 1941. It was mostly the work of Teja Singh.

=== Santhya Sri Guru Granth Sahib ===
Seven volumes of commentary were published between 1958 and 1962 by Vir Singh, though the work was never finished.

=== Garib Ganjini Teeka ===
The Garib Ganjini Teeka is one of the most renowned and respected commentaries within the Sikh tradition. The word "Garib Ganjini" means "to destroy ego", principally the ego of Udasi scholar Anandghan. It was authored by Kavi Santokh Singh, as a rebuttal to a work written the Udasi, who he claimed degraded the Japji Sahib and Guru Nanak. Santokh Singh criticized Anandghan for his belief that Guru Nanak recognized 6 Gurus in succession within the Japji Sahib, as well as his esoteric interpretations of the meanings of the text. The teeka only covers the Japji Sahib, and is approximately 180 pages.

=== Sri Guru Granth Sahib Darpan ===
The Sri Guru Granth Sahib Darpan is a 10-volume exegetical work, with over 6,000 pages of literature in total. The work is notable for its objective nature, achieved through Sahib Singh's (the teekakar) complete reliance on the grammar of the Guru Granth Sahib to derive meanings. As such, this exegesis does not include uthankas. The Sri Guru Granth Sahib Darpan was published between 1962 and 1964.
