= Sewaram Singh Thapar =

Sikh writer and judge

Sewaram Singh Thapar was a Sikh writer active during the Singh Sabha movement. He is credited as being the first Sikh to write a work refuting the previous works of Western writers on the topic of Sikh history. He was the first Sikh scholar to write an English-language monograph on Guru Nanak.

== Biography ==
Originally from a sehajdhari background, he became baptized into the Khalsa. He was originally a lawyer and later a District and Sessions Judge. He, alongside Khazan Singh and Bhagat Lakshman Singh, belonged to a group of English-educated and middle-class Sikh writers in the early 20th century whom wrote with the idea that they were correcting previous works by Western writers that they believed misrepresented the Sikhs. Judging previous writers, Sewaram agreed more with Joseph Davey Cunningham and refuted the conclusions drawn on the Sikh religion by Ernest Trumpp. Sewaram Singh authored The Divine Master in 1904, a monograph on Guru Nanak. Sewaram was also part of the seven-member Sikh deputation to London, England on 11 July 1919, alongside, Shivdev Singh Uberoi, Sohan Singh, and Ujjal Singh, where they demanded 33% representation for Sikhs in the Punjab Legislative Council. His son was Major General Harkirat Singh, who was involved with Hemkund Sahib and the Baba Nanak Shrine in Iraq.

== Bibliography ==
- Anecdotes from Sikh History
- The Indian Constitution and Parliamentary Sovereignty
- The Divine Master: A Study of the Life and Teachings of Sri Guru Nanak Dev (Lahore: Gulab Singh & Sons, 1904)
- A Critical Study of the Life and Teachings of Sri Guru Nanak Dev the Founder of Sikhism (Rawalpindi: Commercial Union Press, 1904) – a new edition was published in 1930 by the Rai Sahib M. Gulab Singh & Sons, Lahore
- In the Service of Motherland or a Leaf from Sikh History (Rawalpindi: N.I. Works, 1908)
- Reforms and the Sikhs (Lahore: Mufid-i-'am Press, 1920)
- Indian Reforms Scheme: Report of the Working of the Sikh Deputation to England (Lahore: Mufid-i-'am Press, 1920)
