= Dasam duar =

Sikh metaphysical concept

Dasam duar (Gurmukhi: ਦਸਮ ਦੁਆਰ; "tenth door"), also known as the Bajar kapat (ਬਜਰ ਕਪਾਟ; "impenetrable door"), is a philosophical concept of Sikhism. It refers to an invisible, spiritual or metaphysical gateway in which a human can interact with and experience divinity. Similar concepts are found in Tantra and the Naths.

== Theory ==
The originally non-theistic theory originates from Buddhist Siddhars, later being adopted by the Nath Sampardya and then the Sants, and finally the Sikhs. According to Gursharanjit Singh, it originates from yogis. There are nine traditional, visible, natural bodily orifices (two ears, two eyes, two nostrils, mouth, anus, urethra), with the dasam duar as per the Naths being located on the fontanel of the skull which is accessed through the highest level of hatha yoga, with the liberated spirit passing through this metaphysical door. While the nine other openings operate the physical body and remain open, the tenth opening remains closed and is viewed as a spiritual gate that allows for communication with divinity. This location is known as Brahmarandhra, believed to be located at where the Ida, Pingala, and Sushumna nadi channels confluence (Triveni) at the top of the skull, carrying kundalini energy upward, with prana passing through this gate. To open the gate, hatha-sadhana is required, which allows amrita to run through the sahasrara chakra and the practitioner to reach a state of bodily immortality (amar-kaya). The Sants of mediaeval India adopted the theory and instead replaced hatha-yoga practices with bhakti (devotion) as a means to opening the tenth gate, transforming it into a theistic practice. They believed the doorway was the means of how the jivatma engages with knowledge and action. Aside from being a place of divinity, it is also a source of bliss.

=== In Sikhism ===
In Sikhism, it is a means of experiencing and realizing God, believed to be a hidden place where God resides accessible through wisdom and developing a sense of oneness. The term is used figuratively (with its exact location not being able to be defined or known via logic) used by the Sikh gurus as a tenth gate accessible only via spiritual means, which allows a person to access divinity. Other sources claim the Sikh location is between the ears, on the forehead. It is believed to be a dwelling place of God, accessible through the Sikh gurus. At this place, there occurs anhad shabad (celestial melody) and naam, which causes the human soul to reach mukti (liberation), which cannot be heard through independent means but rather only via the shabad of the Sikh guru. However, haumai blocks the opening of the dasam duar. The term finds mention in the Guru Granth Sahib, such as in the Anand Sahib of Guru Amar Das. A similar theory is written about by Bhai Gurdas in his kabits. The methods of opening the dasam duar include reading gurbani, connecting to naam, and bhakti (devotion and adoration for the divine). However, sometimes it is referred to in the context of it referring to sensory or motor functions that a human must control.

== Views ==
Kahn Singh Nabha and Sahib Singh believed the term referred to how the human mind operates intellectually, being responsible for both thought and reflection. Piara Singh Padam believed it did not refer to an actual location but rather was a spiritual concept. Joginder Singh Talwara and Randhir Singh opined that it was a gateway to divinely-produced shabad, kirtan, and amrit, accessible via wisdom from the guru. These latter two explanations were supported by Bhai Jodh Singh, Giani Haribans Singh, and Ratan Singh Jaggi.
