= Khazan Singh =

Sikh writer and historian

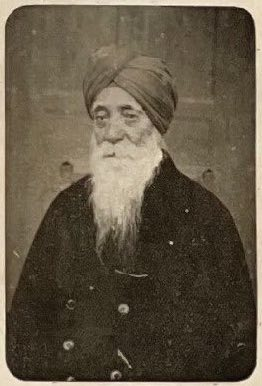
Portrait photograph of the Sikh author Khazan Singh, published on the cover of his book 'Light of Universe' (1950)

Khazan Singh (1865–1953) was a Sikh writer and historian active during the Singh Sabha and Gurdwara Reform movements. He served as the Extra Assistant Commissioner at Delhi. He authored the work History and Philosophy of the Sikh Religion, published in 1914 in two volumes, one of the first comprehensive English accounts on the history and philosophy of the Sikhs.

Khazan Singh, alongside Bhagat Lakshman Singh and Sewaram Singh Thapar, were part of a group of nascent, middle-class Sikhs in the early 20th century seeking to author a more sympathetic Sikh version of their history to correct what they perceived as misrepresentations by Western writers before them, such as by Ernest Trumpp. Khazan Singh considered the Guru Granth Sahib and Vaaran by Bhai Gurdas to be the foundation for any works on Sikhism to be based upon. Khazan Singh considered Guru Nanak to have been a divine teacher and focused on the originality of his teachings. He viewed all the works of the Sikh gurus as a lead-up to the culmination of the founding of the Khalsa and believed in both the concept of the Guru Granth and Guru Panth as being the form of the Sikh guru.

70 manuscripts authored by Khazan Singh were in the Sikh Reference Library in Amritsar and lost during Operation Blue Star in 1984. Khazan Singh was also involved in the legal dispute regarding Sikh kirpans with the British government.

== Bibliography ==
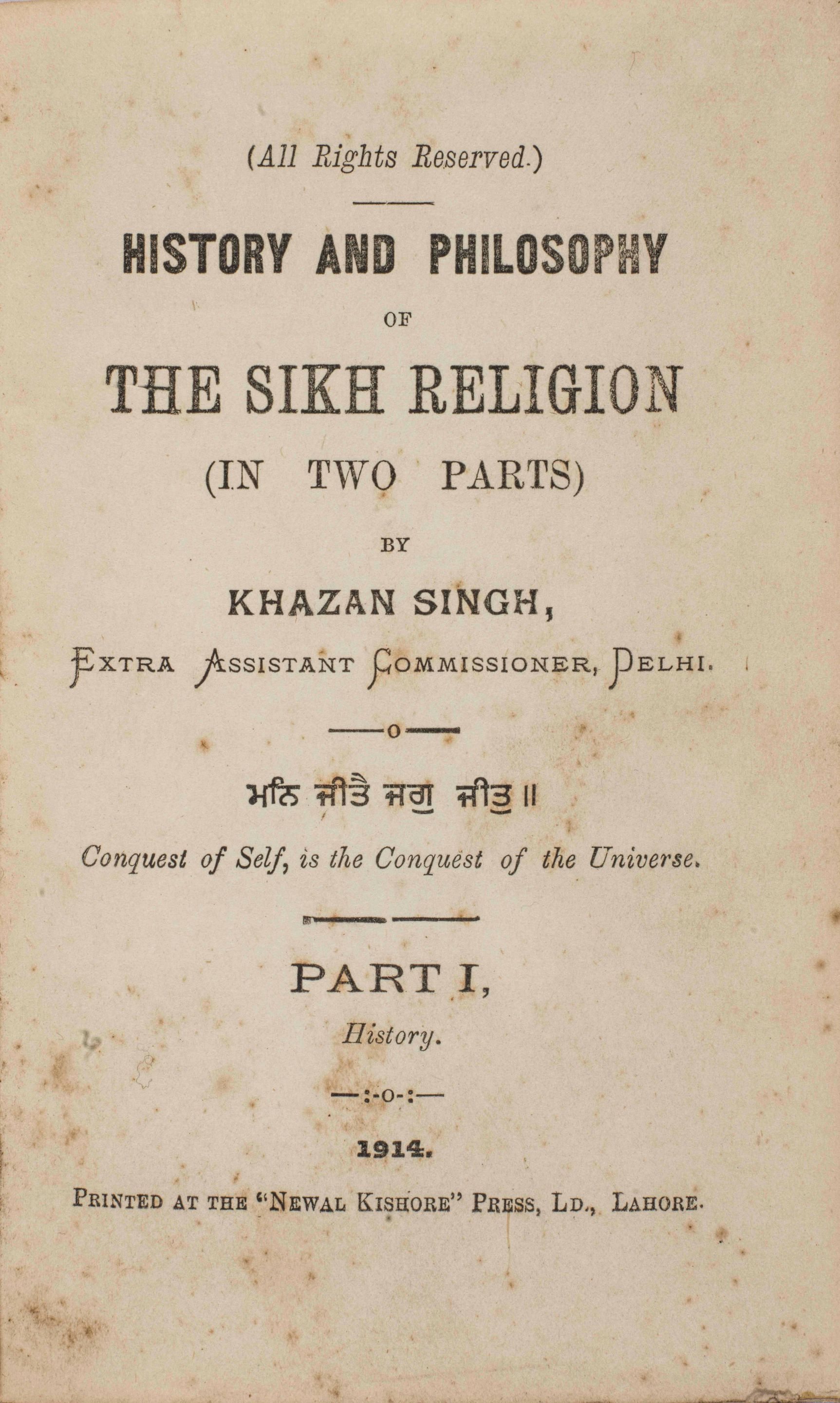
Title-page of 'History and Philosophy of the Sikh Religion' (Lahore: "Newal Kishore" Press, 1914, Part I) by Khazan Singh

Some works authored by Khazan Singh include:

- Akali Movement: Correspondence with late S.B. Mehtab Singh, a Leader of the Movement
- Brief Review of the Gurdwara Reform Movement
- Colourization of Vanaspati Ghee and Corruption: A Correspondence with Government
- Correspondence on Akali Movement
- Correspondence on Indian Freedom Movement
- Correspondence with Lord Hailey, Former Governor of Punjab and U.P.
- Gleanings from the Indian history and Morchas at Guru-Ka-Bagh and Jaito
- History and Philosophy of the Sikh religion (Lahore: Newal Kishore Press, 1914)
- Quit India in Peace: Advice to the English in 1922
- Role in the Kirpan Struggle
- Warning to the Panth
- Message of the Sikhs (Lahore: Model Electric Press)
- Miracles of the Sikh Gurus (Sialkot: self-published, 1932)
- Gurdwara Handbook (Lahore: Model Electric Press, 1934)
- Light of Universe (1950)
