= Sikhism in Iraq =

Sikhism in Iraq السيخية في العراق
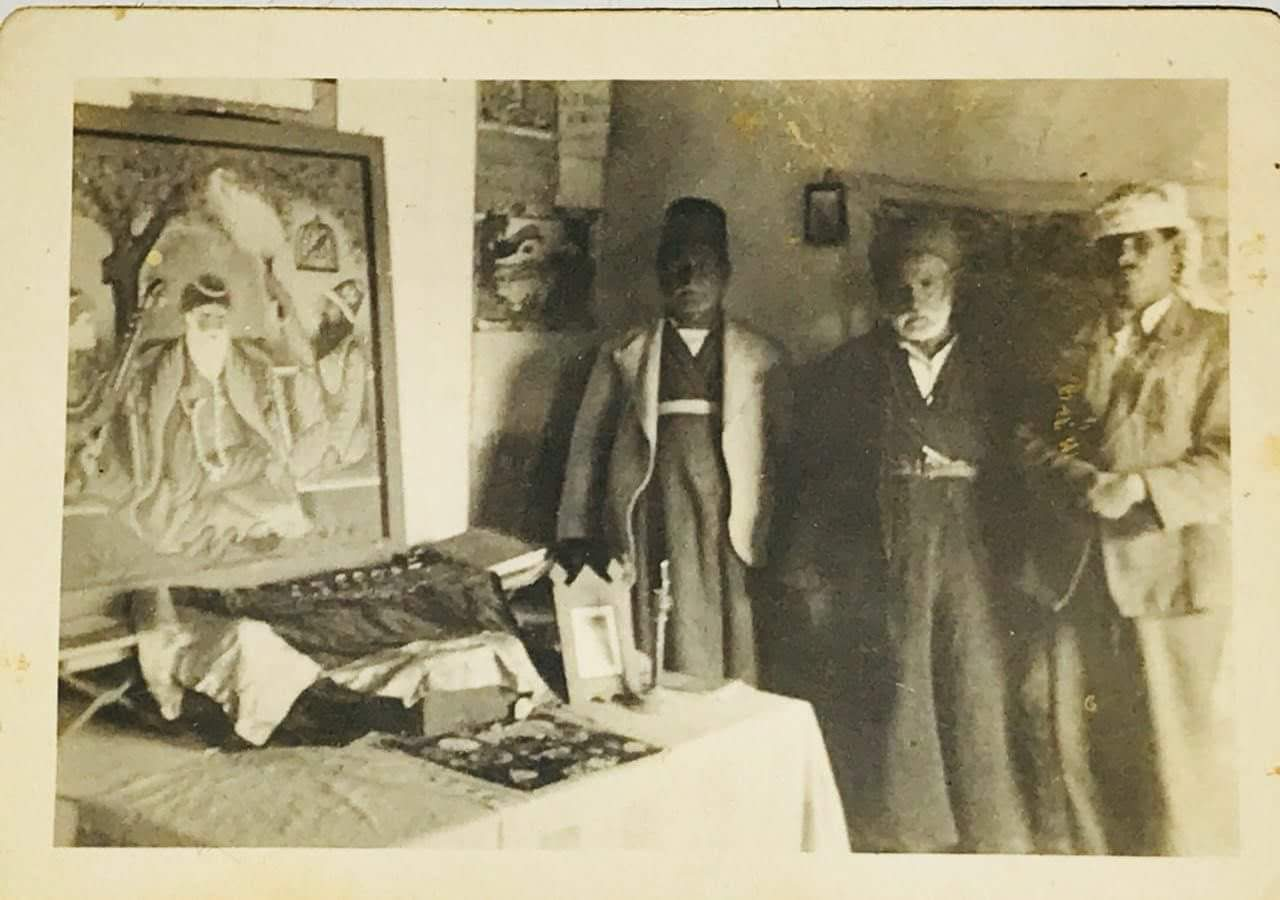
- Photograph taken within the Guru Nanak's shrine in Baghdad (Baba Nanak Shrine), circa early to mid 20th century

Total population
- 5,600 0.02%

Regions with significant populations
- Baghdad

Religions
- Sikhism

Languages
- Iraqi Arabic • Punjabi · Hindi • Urdu

Sikhism has a historical presence in Iraq because of the founder Guru Nanak's travels throughout the region, and Sikh conscripts stationed in Iraq during both World Wars.

It is estimated that there are 5,600 Sikhs currently living in Iraq, forming 0.02% of the population.

== Guru Nanak's journey ==
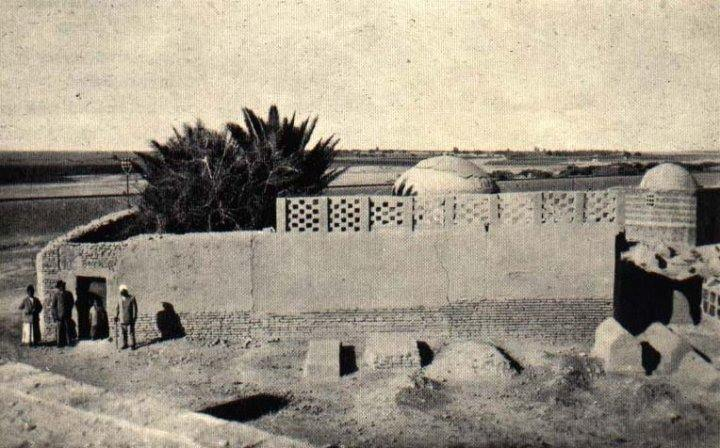
Baba Nanak Shrine in Baghdad

Guru Nanak travelled vast distances in four major journeys with his Muslim Minstrel, Bhai Mardana. During the western Udasi (journey), he travelled across the Muslim world and at one point stayed outside of Baghdad. According to historical sources he held a dialogue with Sheikh Bahlool Dana, a Sufi saint. At some point, a shrine to Guru Nanak was built alongside Bahlool Dana's tomb. In the chaos following the 2003 invasion of Iraq looters or vandals stripped the monument of religious texts and a plaque commemorating the meeting.

The monument still exists, but its condition is poor. Local residents refer to it as the Baba Nanak Shrine. It is located close to al-Muthunna, near Baghdad. Guru Nanak is traditionally known as “Nanak Peer” in Iraq.

== World Wars ==
During both World Wars, Sikh soldiers in the British Army were posted in Iraq. During World War I, the shrine to Guru Nanak was rediscovered by a Sikh captain, Dr. Kirpal Singh, after having been forgotten for centuries. Dr. Kirpal Singh, a captain in the Indian Medical Service of the British Indian Army, located the gurdwara in the west of Baghdad between an old graveyard to the north and the Baghdad Samara railway line to the south. To the local Arab population, the place was known as the Tomb of Bahlol. In the early 1930s, Sikh soldiers repaired the shrine and during World War II continued its upkeep. The shrine was also visited by Sikh personnel during their service in the region, including Lt.-Governor Partap Singh Gill, who visited the gurdwara during WWII. A former Engineer-in-Chief of the Indian Army, Major General Harkirat Singh, visited Baghdad in 1982 to encourage the local Sikh community to develop the shrine into a major gurdwara. Historic relics at the shrine, including an old plaque with text inscribed in Arabic, existed until the 2003 Iraq war but were looted afterward. In 2007, the Iraqi government expressed a desire to rebuild the shrine.

American Sikh Uday Singh Taunque died in the Iraq war. In 2014, ISIS kidnapped and shot 40 Indian Sikhs, with all but one dying.
