= Cultural heritage in Pakistan =

Pakistan's cultural heritage includes archaeological sites, stupas, forts, shrines, tombs, buildings, residences, monuments, and places of worship. Until the passing of the Eighteenth Amendment to the Constitution of Pakistan, some sites were under the federal government while others were in the provincial domain.

In 1997, the Pakistan Environmental Protection Agency, Ministry of Environment Pakistan, published a list of notified protected archaeological sites and monuments, according to which there are total 389 sites and monuments under federal government protection while 444 are under provincial governments. Punjab and Sindh are the only two provinces which have provincial level laws to protect heritage. Aside from these sites, there are many others which are unprotected or privately owned.

== List of cultural heritage sites by region ==
The following are the region-wise lists of cultural heritage sites in the country:

- List of cultural heritage sites in Azad Kashmir
- List of cultural heritage sites in Balochistan
- List of cultural heritage sites in Gilgit-Baltistan
- List of cultural heritage sites in Islamabad Capital Territory
- List of cultural heritage sites in Khyber Pakhtunkhwa
- List of cultural heritage sites in Punjab (Lahore)
- List of cultural heritage sites in Sindh (Karachi)
