= Bhagat Lakshman Singh =

Sikh writer

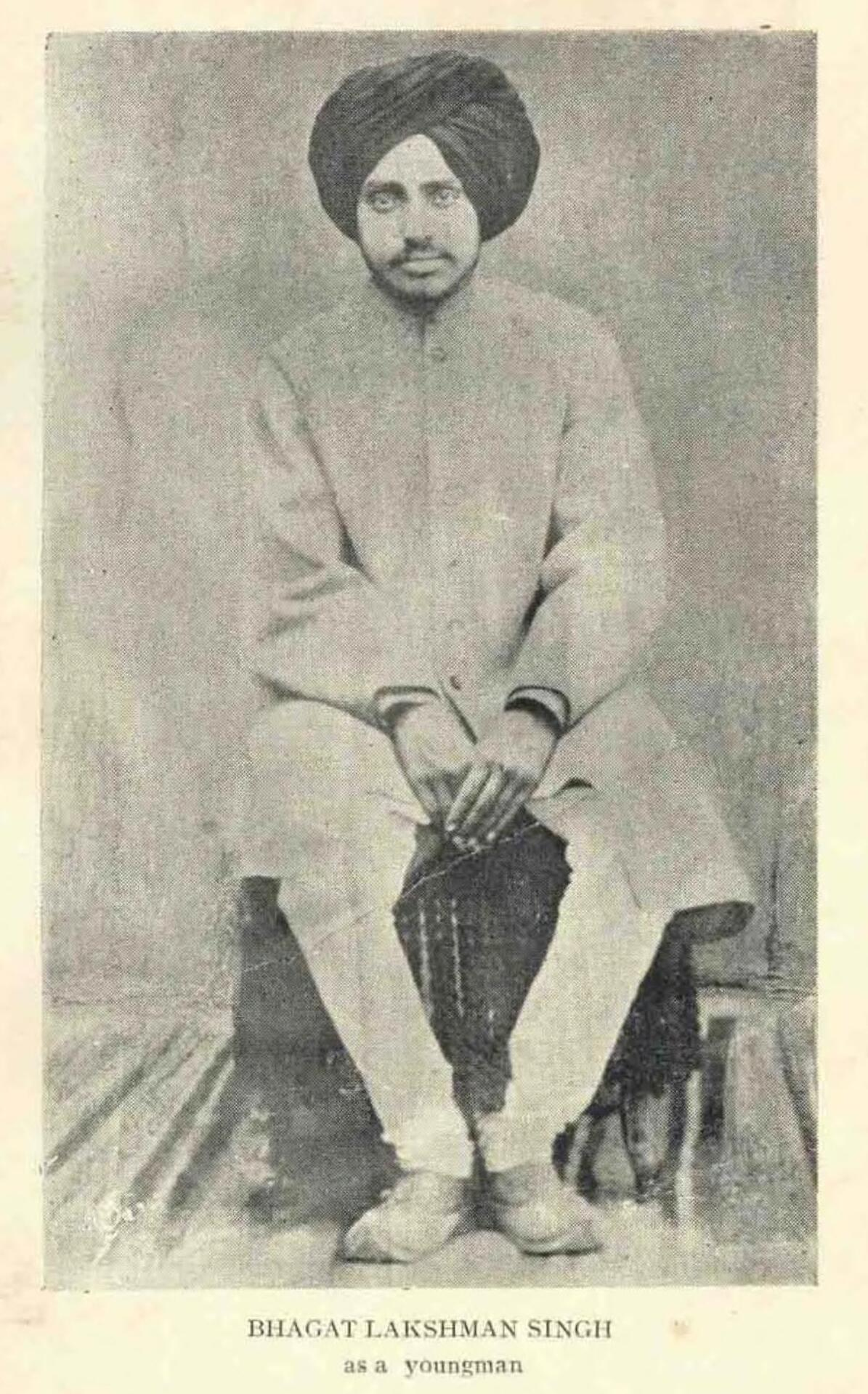
Photograph of Bhagat Lakshman Singh in his youth, circa late 19th century

Bhagat Lakshman Singh (1863–1944) was a Sikh writer, journalist, and reformer active during the Singh Sabha movement. He wrote books on Guru Gobind Singh and Sikh martyrs. He was the founder of The Khalsa newspaper. He was a Professor of History and Literature at Gordon Mission College in Rawalpindi.

== Early life ==
Lakshman Singh was born in 1863 in Rawalpindi, Punjab in a Hindu family to parents Bhagat Kahan Chand and Bhagatani Gurditti. He became initiated as a Sikh in 1895 under Khem Singh Bedi, a direct descendant of Guru Nanak.

== Career ==
Bhagat Lakshman Singh met Max Arthur MacAuliffe while he was at the Rawalpindi Mission College when Macauliffe was still preparing his seminal treatise The Sikh Religion. In 1899, he founded a pro-Singh Sabhaist English newspaper titled simply as The Khalsa, which had a lifespan of two years, after which its production ceased due to financial issues. In 1929, he relaunched his newspaper. Lakshman Singh was also an active contributor of articles to The Tribune. Bhagat Lakshman, alongside Khazan Singh and Sewaram Singh Thapar, were part of a group of nascent, middle-class Sikhs in the early 20th century seeking to author a more sympathetic Sikh version of their history to correct what they perceived as misrepresentations by Western writers before them. In his 1909 work on Guru Gobind Singh, Lakshman summarized the works of the tenth guru as being the culmination of the works of the preceding nine gurus. Lakshman Singh's analyses and conclusions on Sikh history was akin to those of Joseph Davey Cunningham and Max Arthur MacAuliffe and differed from the perspective of Ernest Trumpp. Lakshman Singh also authored a biographical book covering Sikh martyrs in 1919. Lakshman Singh alongside Sardar Mehar Singh established the Khalsa Sudhar Sabha which produced reformist literature and missionaries for rural settings in the villages.

== Bibliography ==
Some works by Lakshma Singh includes:

- A Short Sketch of the Life and Works of Guru Gobind Singh, the 10th and Last Guru of the Sikhs (Lahore: "The Tribune Steam" Press, 1909)
- Foundations and Managements of Khalsa Schools (Amritsar: Sikh Educational Conference, 1913)
- Decay of Sikh institutions: Sanatanis and the Sikhs (Lahore: Sikh Tract Society, 1916)
- The Sikhs and His New Critics (Mahilpur: The Sikh Tract Society, April–May 1918)
- Sikh Martyrs (1919)
