= Sahib Singh =

Sikh academic and theologian (1892–1977)

- Born: 16 February 1892
- Died: 29 October 1977 (aged 85); Patiala
- Education: B.A.
- Alma mater: Govt. College, Lahore
- Occupations: Professor, essay writer, linguist, translator
- Spouse: Agya Kaur
- Children: son: Daljit Singh (eye specialist)
- Writing career
- Language: Punjabi
- Period: 1915
- Subject: Sikh religious philosophy
- Notable works: "Guru Granth Darpan (1962–64), Gurbani Vyakaran"
- Notable awards: Honorary D. Lit Punjabi University Patiala on 7 Jan 1971
- Website: gurugranthdarpan.net

Sahib Singh (16 February 1892 – 29 October 1977) was a Sikh academic who made a contribution to Sikh literature. He was a grammarian, author, scholar and theologian. He was born in a Hindu family to father Hiranand and was named Natthu Ram. He is credited with founding a Sikh exagetical approach that is free from influences of earlier sects and traditions, such as the Gianis.

== Early life ==
As a youth, Natthu Ram was apprenticed to a Muslim teacher, Hayat Shah, son of Punjabi poet Hashim, to teach him the Persian language.

Whilst at junior school, he saw Sikh soldiers and was so impressed with them that he decided to keep unshorn hair. In 1906, when he was in the ninth grade he became Amritdhari and gave himself the name of "Sahib Singh". At that time he stopped learning Persian and started learning Sanskrit, which later on helped him in understanding Guru Granth Sahib.

== Later life ==
After passing the tenth grade, Sahib Singh joined a local school. Later he applied for a job with the postal department, and got the job, borrowing 20 Rs from his house maid as traveling expenses.

Later he left home to pursue higher education. He had nowhere to go, having very little money. He later met Pundit Vesta Parsad, a scholarly teacher for help.

Sahib Singh passed his FA and Bachelor of fine arts and started work at Frakka college and later joined Gujranwala Khalsa college. It was at this college that he met Bava Harkrishan Singh and Bhai Jodh Singh. Sahib Singh's financial situation had improved by this time so that he was able to pay back his debts.

== Employment ==
The death of his father made the situation hard for him. He entered Dyal Singh College, Lahore, and then the Government College, Lahore where he obtained his bachelor's degree. In 1917 he joined Nanak Khalsa College, Gujranwala as a lecturer in Sanskrit. In 1921 Sahib Singh became the assistant general secretary of the SGPC. Sahib Singh took part in Guru Ka Bagh Morcha in 1922 and was arrested. In 1923 he was again arrested when he took part in Jaito Morcha. In 1927 he rejoined Gujranwala college, where he stayed until 1936. At this time he moved to Amritsar and joined the Khalsa college as a lecturer in Punjabi. At the college he met fellow Sikh scholars like Teja Singh, Ganda Singh, Veeram Singh and Mohan Singh. In 1952 he retired from this college to take up a post as Principal at Shaheed Missionary college, Amritsar. In 1962 he left to join his son at Sidhwan Bet near Jagroan. When his son moved to Patiala, he took classes at Gurmat college in Patiala. He was awarded a Doctorate of Letters by Punjabi University, Patiala in 1971.

== Health and illness ==
Sahib Singh was often afflicted with illnesses. He suffered from Parkinson's disease and died on 29 October 1977.

== Publications ==
Sahib Singh wrote extensively in Punjabi, but most of his works have now been translated into English, Hindi and other prominent world languages.

- Savaiye Sri Mukhvak Maihla 5 ate Bhatta De Savaiye Steek (1930)
- Jap Ji Sahib Steek (1931)
- Asa Di Vaar Steek (1933)
- Sad Steek (1935)
- Bhattan de Savaiye Steek (1935)
- Sukhmani Sahib Steek (1939)
- Khulhe Maidan
- Jaap Sahib Savaiye Chaupai Steek (1944)
- Dasa Varan Steek (1946)
- Salok Te Shabad Farid Ji Steek (1946)
- Dharmic Loka (1946)
- Gurbani Te Itihas Bare (1946)
- Burai Da Takra (1946)
- Salok Guru Angad Sahib Steek (1948)
- Chanan Munare (1949)
- Salok Kabir Ji Steek (1949)
- Satte Balwand Di Var Steek (1949)
- Gurbani Vyakarn (1950)
- Chara Varan Steek (1951)
- Dharam Te Sadachar (1951)
- Sarbat Da Bhala (1951)
- Siddh Gost Steek (1957)
- Bhagat Bani Steek Pahila Hisa (1959)
- Bhagat Bani Steek Duja Hisa (1959)
- Bhagat Bani Steek Tija Hisa (1959)
- Bhagat Bani Steek Chautha Hisa (1960)
- Bhagat Bani Steek Punjvah Hisa (1960)
- Sikh Sidak Na Haare (1962)
- Jeevan Britant – Guru Nanak Dev Ji
- Jeevan Britant – Sri Guru Angad Dev Ji
- Jeevan Britant – Sri Guru Amar Das Ji
- Jeevan Britant – Sri Guru Ramdas Ji
- Jeevan Britant – Sri Guru Arjan Dev Ji
- Sri Guru Granth Sahib Darpan (Dasa Pothiarn) (1965)
- Jeevan Britant – Sri Guru Gobind Singh Ji (1966)
- Jeevan Britant – Sri Guru Hargobind Sahib Ji
- Jeevan Britant – Sri Guru Tegh Bahadur Ji
- Jeevan Britant – Sri Guru Har Rai Sahib te Sri Guru Harkrishan Sahib
- Gur Itihas Patshahi 2 ton 9 (1968)
- Aad Bir bare (1970)
- Sikh Sidak Na Hare
- Sadachar Lekh (1971)
- Simran Diya Barkata (1971)
- Barahmaha, Tukhari Te Maajh (1972)
- Meri Jeevan Kahani (1977)

=== Posthumous ===
- Nitnem Steek (1979)
- Babania Kahanian (1981)
- Bani Maihla 9 Steek (2003)

== See also ==
- Guru Granth Sahib
- Sikh Gurus
- Sikhism
