= Bara Bagh Cemetery, Lasbela =

Graveyard in Balochistan, Pakistan

- Interactive map of Bara Bagh Cemetery, Lasbela

Details
- Location: Lasbela District, Balochistan
- Country: Pakistan
- Coordinates: 26°17′04″N 66°18′19″E

Bara Bagh Cemetery, Lasbela is an ancient cemetery of the Jams of Lasbela of the Lasbela princely state, containing more than 100 graves of which 40 belong to the Jams.

== Location ==
It is located at Bara Bagh, eight kilometers away from Lasbela District, Balochistan, Pakistan.

== Notable burials ==
- Ghulam Qadir Khan Korejo (1920–1988)
- Jam Mohammad Yousaf Korejo (1954–2013)
