= Judeir-jo-daro =

Archaeological site in Balochistan, Pakistan

- Type: Archaeological site
- Location: Jhat Pat and Dera Murad Jamali, Nasirabad District, Balochistan, Pakistan
- Region: Harappan civilization

Site notes
- Area: 62 acres (25 ha)

Judeir-jo-daro, also known as Damb Judeir, is an archaeological site dating back to the Harappan period in Balochistan, Pakistan. The city, during its time, was a moderate sized settlement with a population of around 20,240 and an area of 2,700,000 square feet (62 acres).

The present day site is a federally protected archaeological site located between Jhatpat and Dera Murad Jamali in the Nasirabad District of Balochistan.
