= Baba Nanak Shrine =

Shrine in Baghdad, Iraq; a sacred site in Sikhism

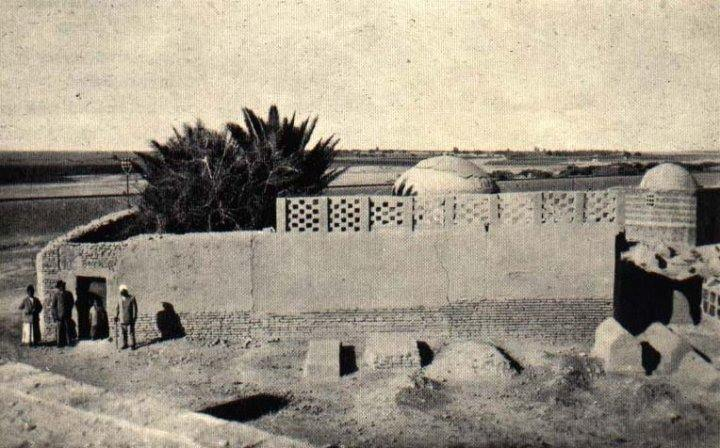
- Photograph of the front face of Baba Nanak Shrine in Baghdad, Iraq, circa 1920's

- Location within Baghdad Location within Iraq Location within Asia

Religion
- Affiliation: Sikhism

Location
- Location: Baghdad
- Country: Iraq
- Interactive map of Baba Nanak Shrine
- Coordinates: 33°20′10.2768″N 44°21′50.1732″E

The Baba Nanak Shrine was a Sikh gurdwara in Baghdad, Iraq, which was rediscovered by Sikh soldiers during World War I and was repaired and rebuilt during World War II, by Sikh soldiers again, existed till 2003 in somewhat good shape.

The founder of the Sikh religion, Guru Nanak, who is traditionally locally referred to Nanak Peer as in the area, came to Baghdad in the early sixteenth century, around 1511 AD after visiting the holy Muslim cities of Mecca and Medina. He was initially not allowed to enter the city of Baghdad, which made him spend the night in the cemetery outside the city. The shrine was originally constructed by the local people in the cemetery area in Guru Nanak's holy memory.

== Historical significance ==
The radiance on Guru Nanak's face was reported to be so profound that word spread that a saint had arrived. Consequently, Guru Nanak ji exchanged spiritual and metaphysical ideas with religious authorities, especially Pir Dastgir and Pir Bahlol, both of whom then became disciples of Guru Nanak and bowed to him. This led to formation of a group of his followers in Baghdad who remembered the Guru as Baba Nanak. There was only loose contact between this place and Sikhs of the Punjab until the First World War when Sikh soldiers rediscovered the shrine.

A former Engineer-in-Chief of the Indian Army, Major General Harkirat Singh, KCIO — who was instrumental in the design and construction of the present-day Hemkund gurudwara and the technical and management brain behind it—visited Baghdad in 1982, with a mission to encourage the local Sikh community to pitch in to make the Baba Nanak Shrine into a major gurudwara, which task was later undertaken after he died in 1983. Major General Harkirat Singh was the nephew of Capt. (Dr.) Kirpal Singh and the son of Sardar Sewaram Singh, a Sessions Judge, who wrote the first biography of Guru Nanak in the English Language. In that book, titled "Divine Master," Sardar Sewaram Singh writes about the Baba Nanak Shrine and the inscription on a stone tablet. In its revised edition, the book gives the layout of the shrine as drawn by Capt. (Dr.) Kirpal Singh.

Historic relics such as an old plaque with text inscribed in Arabic existed at the Shrine till the Iraq war in 2003, but were looted by miscreants after the war. In 2007, the Iraqi Government expressed a desire to rebuild the shrine. According to a news report, Abu Yusuf was caretaker of the shrine in 2011. Prior to the Iraq war, a few Sikh pilgrims used to visit the shrine. Reports of regular congregations by Indian workers in Iraq, and cooking and sharing langar by them at the shrine are also there.

The historicity of Guru Nanak’s travel to Baghdad has found doubt from a majority of modern scholars who note that the words “Baba Nanak Fakir” on a plaque have been added later with the last word being cramped into the line. The plaque is deemed a forgery.

== Present status ==
The position till 2018 was that the Gurudwara had been completely destroyed. Only parts of an outer wall could be seen next to the Tomb of Bahlol. Only one Mehrab remained in one of the walls. Since 2018, a gate protects the space of the former gurudwara.

== Gallery ==
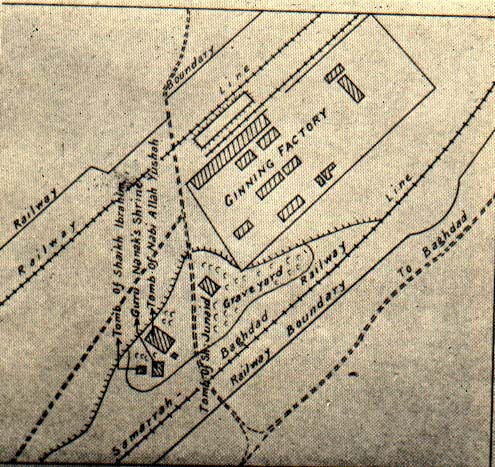
Location of Guru Nanak's shrine from a map of Baghdad, Iraq

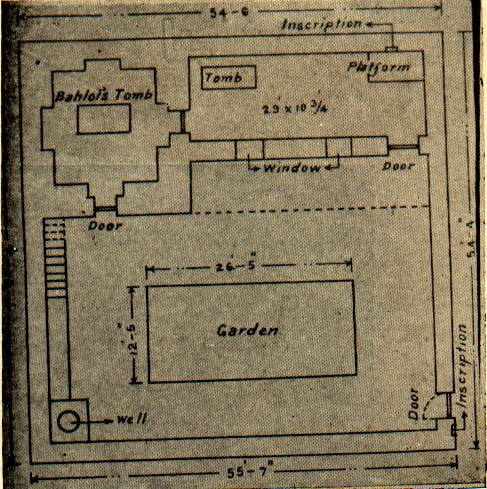
Floor plan of Guru Nanak's shrine in Baghdad, Iraq

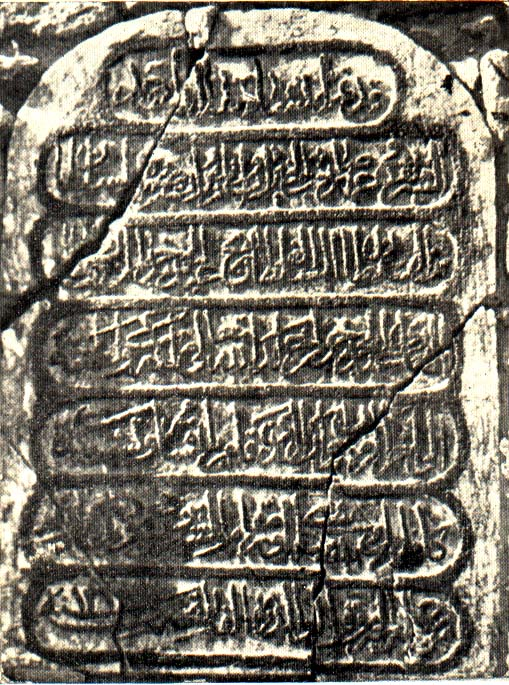
Worn out inscription on the outside of the gurastahn of Guru Nanak's shrine in Baghdad, Iraq

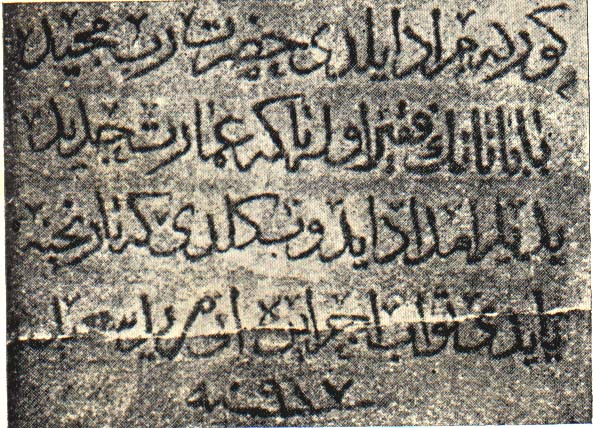
Inscription on the stone slab from Guru Nanak's shrine in Baghdad, Iraq

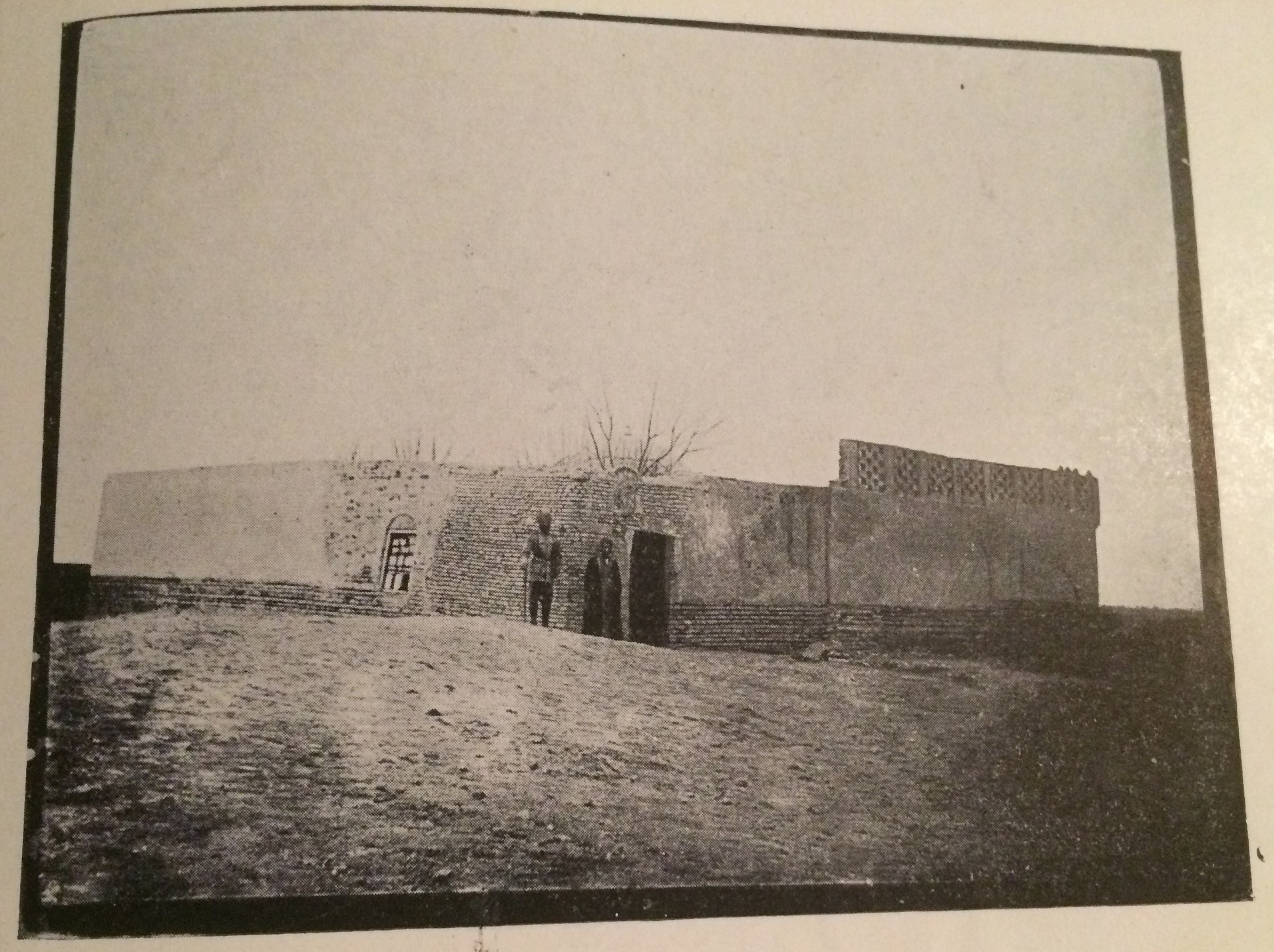
Photograph of Baba Nanak Shrine in Baghdad, Iraq

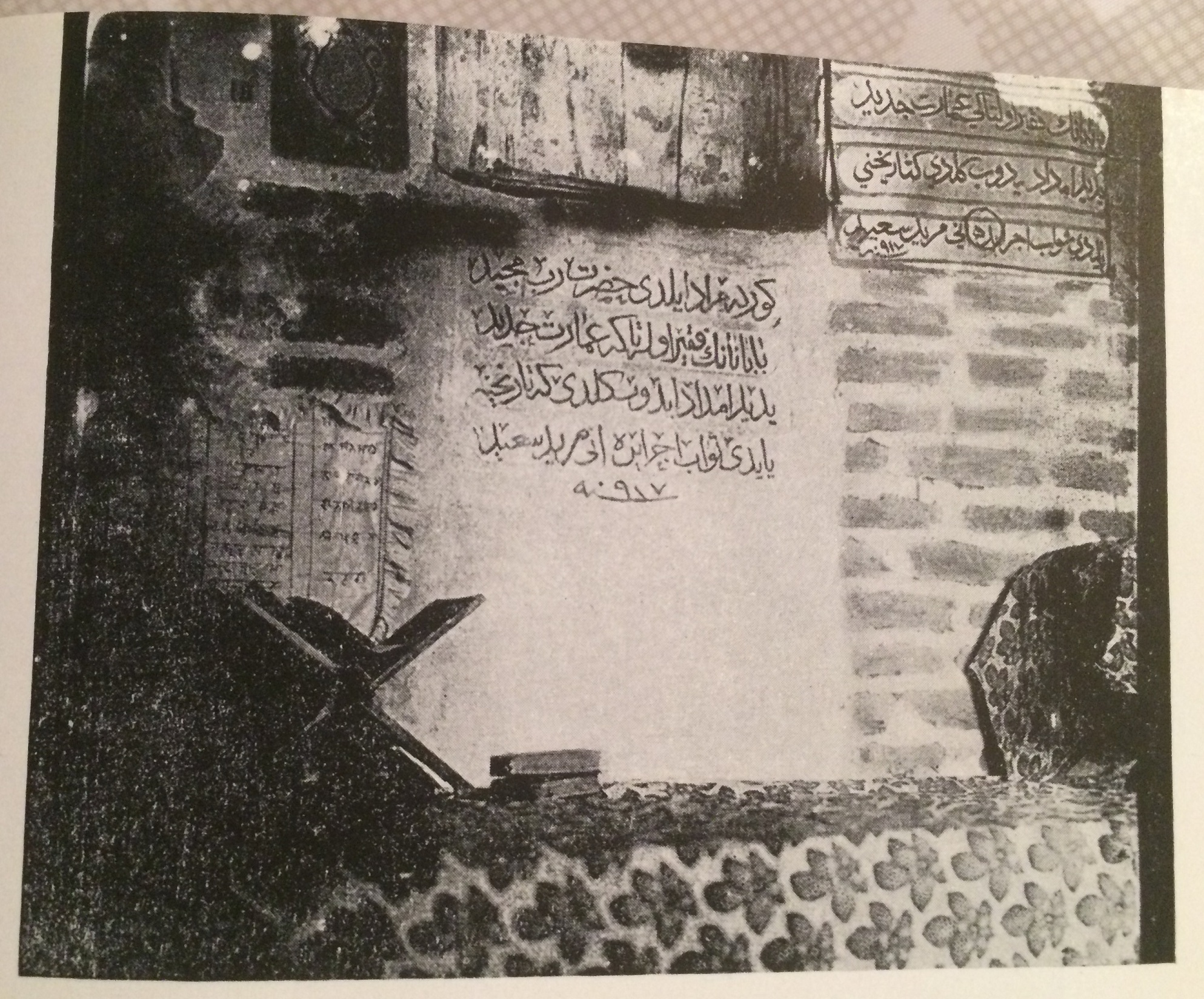
Wall inscriptions from Baba Nanak Shrine in Baghdad, Iraq

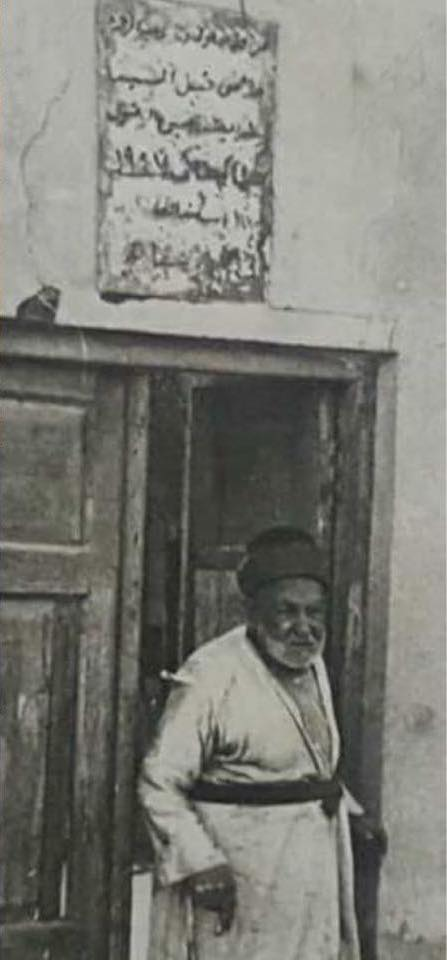
Photograph of the grandfather of Abu Yousuf, who served as the then caretaker of the Baba Nanak Shrine in Baghdad, Iraq
