= Teja Singh =

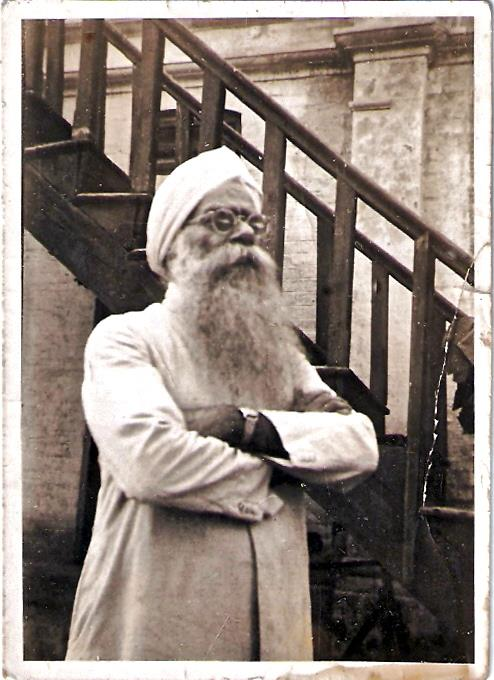
- Born: Tej Ram; 2 June 1894; Adiala village, Rawalpindi district
- Died: 10 January 1958 (aged 63)
- Education: Master's degree in English literature
- Occupations: Writer, scholar
- Writing career
- Language: Punjabi
- Genres: Essays, Critical

Teja Singh was an Indian Sikh scholar, teacher, author and translator.

== Biography ==
Teja Singh was born on 2 June 1894, in Adiala village, Rawalpindi district, Punjab Province, British India to parents Bhai Bhalakar Singh and Srusti. He grazed livestock and studied within the village until 1908, then he moved to Rawalpindi city to garner a further and better education. Originally from a sehajdhari background, he became baptized into the Khalsa.

== Books ==
=== Books in English ===
- Growth of Responsibility in Sikhism (1919)
- The Asa-di-Var (1926)
- Highroads of Sikh History, in three volumes (1935), published by Orient Longman
- Sikhism: Its Ideals and Institutions, published by Orient Longman
- Punjabi-English Dictionary, revised and edited for Lahore University
- English-Punjabi Dictionary, Vol.1 (Punjabi University Solan).

== See also ==
- Sikhism
- Punjab
