= Nikoderian Tombs =

Ancient site in Balochistan, Pakistan

- Type: Towers of Silence
- Location: Nag, Kharan District and Panjgur, Panjgur District, Balochistan, Pakistan

History
- Built: 800 AD

Nikoderian Tombs, also known as Mashkel Tombs, are Towers of Silence located in Balochistan, Pakistan. These are ancient burial grounds of the Zoroastrians dating back to 800 AD. The present day site is an archaeological site spread between the towns of Nag (in Kharan District) and Panjgur (in Panjgur District). The towers were made of burnt bricks and are adorned with various human, animal and mythological figures.
