= Soanian =

Archaeological culture

- Geographical range: South Asia
- Period: Quaternary
- Dates: c.774,000–114,000BCE
- Type site: Siwalik region
- Major sites: Siwalik Hills

The Soanian culture is a prehistoric technological culture from the Siwalik Hills, which encompasses modern-day India, Nepal, and Pakistan. It is named after the Soan Valley in Pakistan.

== Discovery ==
Soanian sites are found along the Siwalik region in present-day India, Nepal and Pakistan. The Soanian culture has been approximated to have occurred during the Middle Pleistocene period or the mid-Holocene epoch (Northgrippian). Debates still go on today regarding the exact period occupied by the culture because artifacts are often found in non-datable surface contexts.

The anthropology and archaeology team led by Helmut de Terra and Thomas Thomson Paterson first discovered and named this culture.

Soanian artifacts were manufactured on quartzite pebbles, cobbles, and occasionally on boulders, all derived from various fluvial sources on the Siwalik landscape. Soanian assemblages generally comprise choppers, discoids, scrapers, cores, and flake-type tools, all occurring in varying typo-technological frequencies at different sites. Excluding some localities in the Soan Valley of Pakistan, Guler (Beas Valley) and Toka site complex in India, and the Arjun-3 site in Nepal, Soanian and similar assemblages rarely comprise more than a few dozen artifacts.

The emergence of Soanian tools has been tied to the local development of boulder conglomerate formation through prehistoric tectonic processes that created a convenient transporting system for raw materials.

Recent research have been focusing on the technological culture's connection with the Harappan culture that originated near the Indus River.

== Dating and historical significance ==
Scholars have debated the prehistoric dating of Soanian culture due to artifacts often found in undatable surface contexts. Some argue it is a culture developed by ancient extinct hominids, Homo erectus. Others have suggested that it was the creation of a group of deurbanized people derived from the Harappan civilization near the Indus alluvial plain. Its artifacts are often found near those of Acheulian culture, which is a Homo erectus culture that took place around the same sub-Himalayan culture zone. There is currently no evidence of the two cultures ever crossing paths and is believed to have existed in different timeframes. There are currently two main interpretations of the prehistoric timeframe occupied by the Soanian culture. One sees the Soanian culture as a period that occurred in three connecting intervals throughout the Middle Pleistocene (774,000 to 129,000 years ago). The other sees the Soanian culture as a single distinct technological culture that may have existed earliest from the mid-Holocene epoch, with some artifacts potentially belonging to the Harappan culture.

=== Three-interval period theory ===
According to this view, Soanian technological culture evolved throughout three broad intervals during the Middle Pleistocene period from circa 774,000 to 129,000 years ago. Scholars of this view believe the technological culture potentially belonged to the ancient hominid group: Homo erectus. The three intervals are known as Pre-Soan, Early Soan, and Late-Soan. The exact dating of these periods is unknown due to tools often found in undatable surface contexts. This view is developed from Helmut de Terra and Thomas Thomson Paterson's early work in the Siwalik region. In analyzing the terrace sequence along the Soan valley in Pakistan, Paterson believed that several Soanian technological phases existed within the glacial and interglacial periods. Pre-Soan and Early Soanian tools are mostly heavy-duty tools like choppers and core scrapers derived from the Lower Paleolithic technological culture of the region. These tools contrast with Late-Soan tools, which consist of flake tools that are smaller in size and for finer purposes.

=== Single distinct technological culture ===
Scholars of this view suggest that Soanian technology did not evolve in three intervals. Still, instead, all belong to one distinct period in early Homo sapiens history during the mid-Holocene epoch. Scholars began to question the three-interval theory when both early Soanian and Late-Soanians tools started to be found together along the same undatable sites. To continue, the Soan river 'terraces' observed by de Terra and Paterson were later discovered to be erosional features rather than terrace sequences that would suggest the prehistorical timing of the artifacts. Second, new findings by the father and son duo Anujot Singh Soni and Vidwan Singh Soni have found Soanian tools on datable sites near Northwestern sub-Himalaya. These sites were dated to be from the mid to late mid-Holocene. Potsherds and weathered redware with coarse fabric were also discovered on some of the sites. These artifacts are believed to have belonged to the Harappan civilization that later lived in villages on the sub-Himalayas. Early human civilizations emerged from antecedent agricultural communities of hills bouldering the Indus alluvial plain.

=== Anthropological relation to Homo sapiens ===
Anatomically modern humans (i.e., Homo sapiens) are believed to emerge from Africa within the Soanian time period around 300,000 years ago; it's been argued that their ways of life changed relatively little from that of archaic humans of the Middle Paleolithic. It would remain this way until about 50,000 years ago when discoveries of a marked increase in the diversity of artifacts found were associated with modern human remains.

== Geographical context ==
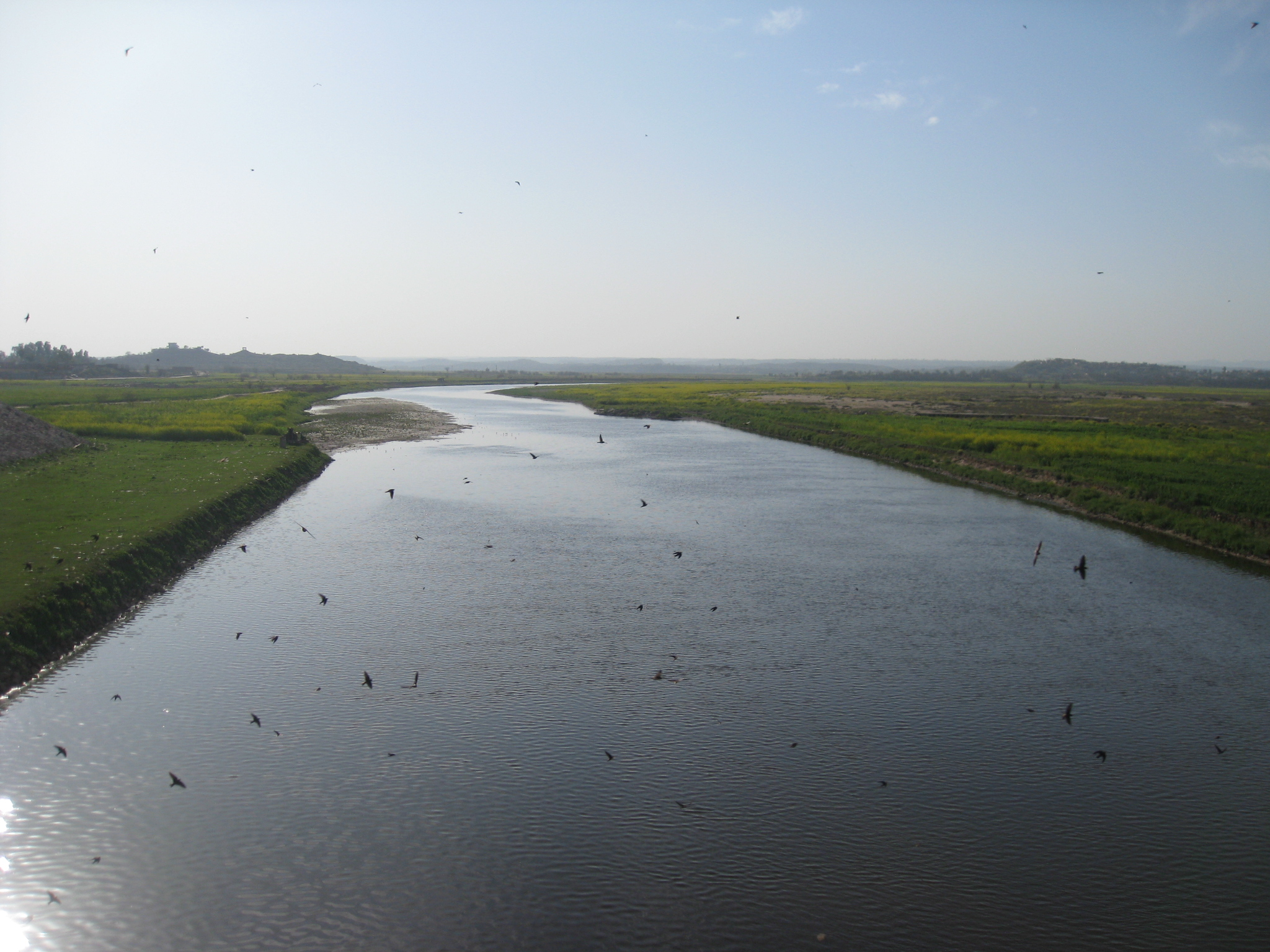
Soan River near Chakri.

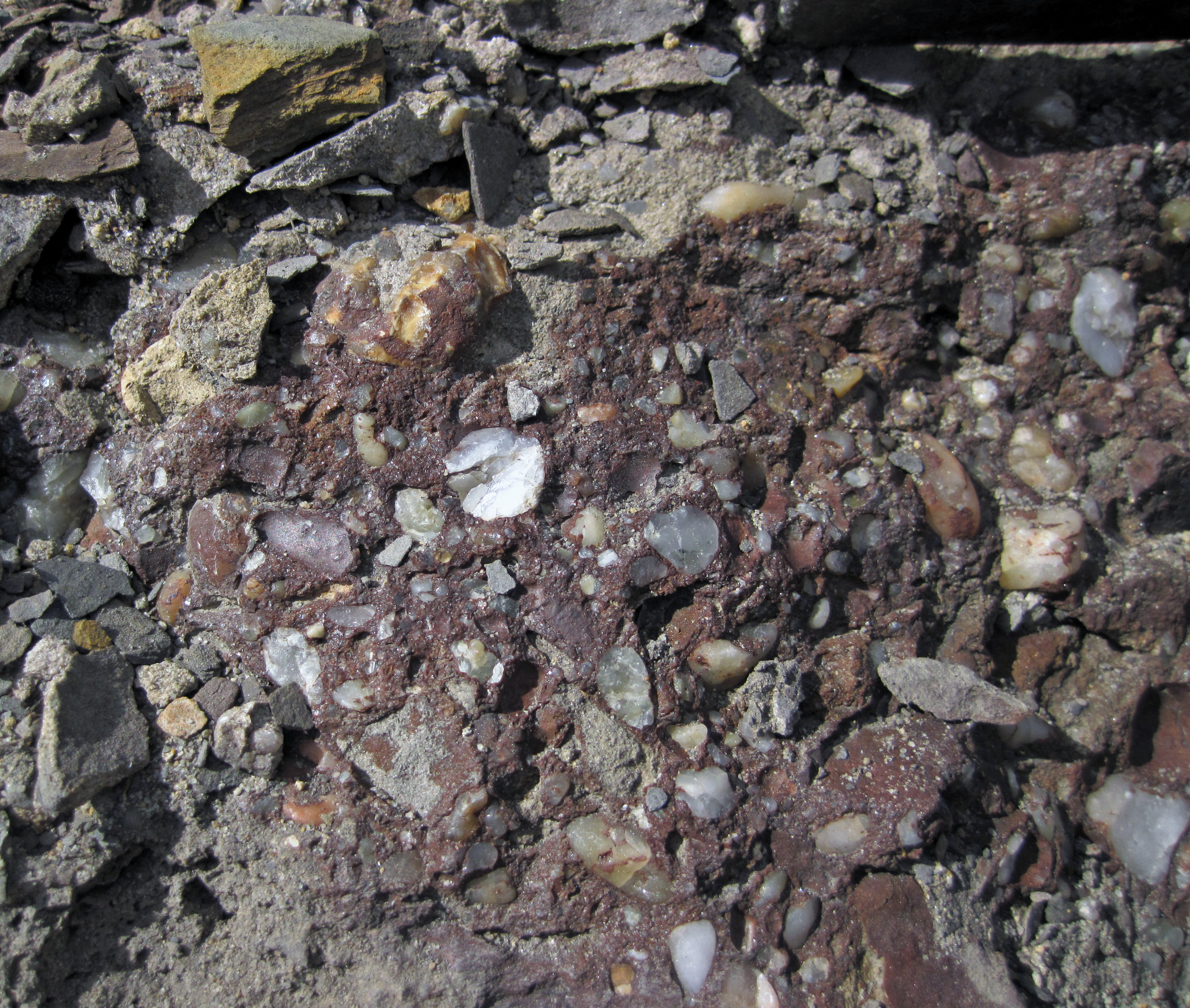
Example of a boulder conglomerate - not of Siwalik region.

The Soanian culture is in the Western part of the Sub-Himalayan terrain, stretching between the river Indus and Yamuna. This area is the primary producer of Soanian artifacts. This technological culture has been correlated to the prehistoric geographical changes in the region that allowed prehistoric humans easy access to raw materials.

This view is often hypothesized to have resulted from boulder conglomerate formation in the Siwalik region between 0.7 and 1.7 million years ago. These formations are collections of large rocks made of small fragments that have been deposed through tectonic processes. They can look like levitated ranges or hills. The tectonic process also formed rivers and fluvial systems that carried and collected raw materials, such as distal alluvial fans and proximal-distal braided stream systems. In the Siwalik region, quartzite pebbles, cobbles, and boulders are the dominant raw materials.

From 1.6 million years ago onwards, the existing boulder conglomerate formation saw more changes that further contributed to easy raw materials access for local ancient humans. Further tectonic movements and erosion saw the Siwalik fluvial courses altered, developing more complex river systems and deposits that carried and collected sediments. This also contributed to new drainage systems formed by new alluvial conditions in the South Siwalik region. These new developments allowed for easy access to materials and prevented the need for long-distance transport. This geographical context from which the Soanian culture developed is known to scholars as the Post-Boulder Conglomerate Formation period.

Scholars of the single interval period argue Soanian tools were developed due to the movement of the Harappan culture. During the mid-Holocene global arid phase, when water supply starts to dry up across the globe, the Harappans who were originally around the Indus Valley mostly shifted to the sub-Himalayas in search of water sources. This led to a diminishing of the broad trading system of resources within the civilization, including materials like metal. As a result, Harappans started to manufacture tools using stones that were later discovered to be Soanian tools. This period has been viewed as a process of deurbanization of the Harappan culture, where they began to decrease in size, turning into smaller village-type settlements.

In a broader geographical context, Soanian culture is one of many different lithic cultures in Southeast Asia that are abundantly available in Sub-Himalayas. Many unifacial flake tools belonging to the Hoabinhians are discovered near Soanian sites. These tools are also found throughout Nepal, South China, Taiwan and Australia. Another prominent lithic culture in the region belongs to the Acheulians, which are distinguished by their preference for bifacial tools.

=== Post-Siwalik fluvial deposits ===
Most of the post-Siwalik fluvial deposits today are mostly disintegrated; they currently lie above older decomposed sedimentary deposits. Some of them are covered in thick vegetation. These sites stand in contrast with remaining deposits that still stand today, forming basin-like structures.

== Technologies ==
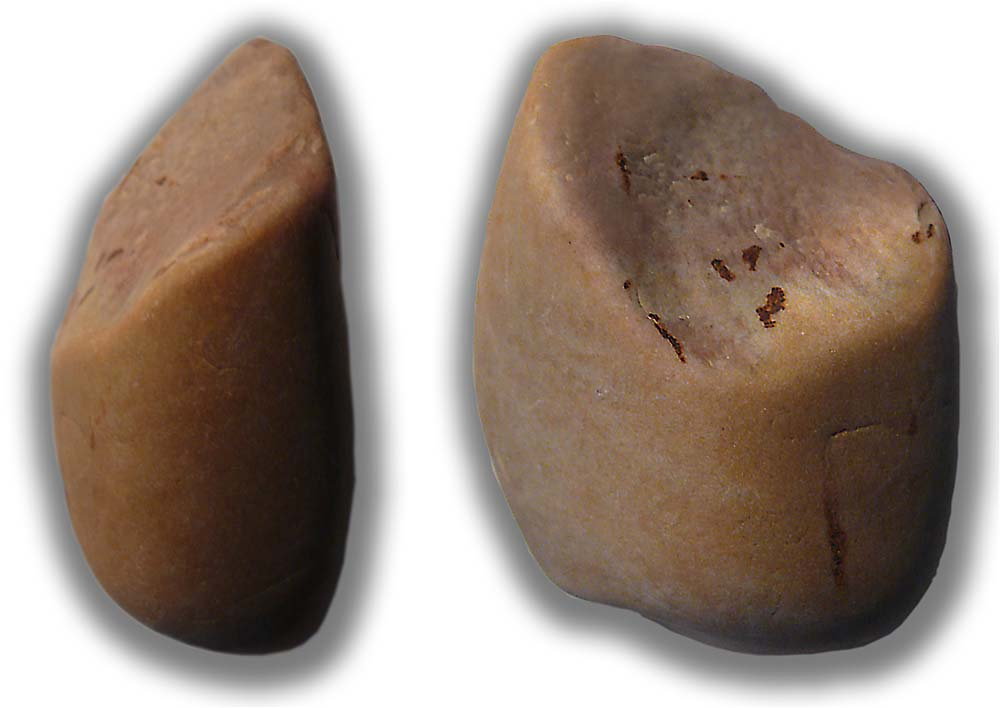
Unifacial chopper.

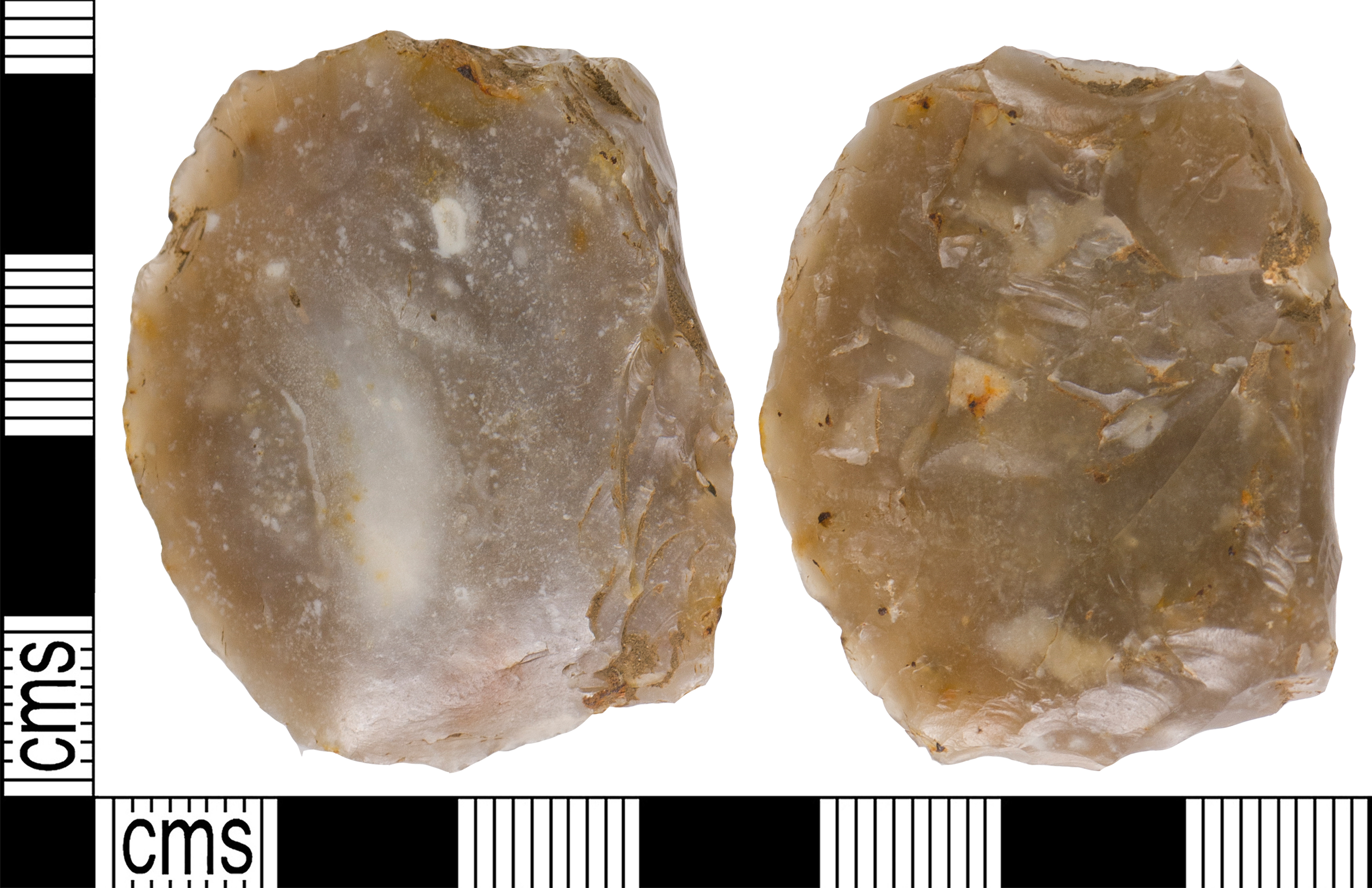
Neolithic lithic scraper.

Understanding of the technological development of Soanian tools has been limited due to most sites rarely comprising more than a few dozen artifacts. Soanian culture's technologies are based on stone-based and often described as non-bifacial assemblages. These tools are categorized based on their unifacial nature with a singular flat surface. Soanian assemblages generally comprise varieties of choppers, discoids, scrapers, cores, and numerous flake-type tools. These tools are mainly for heavy duty but also have finer purposes, as seen in some flake tools used for cutting. These tools are often manufactured on quartzite pebbles, cobbles, and occasionally from boulders. With Soanian technologies being limited, tools often remain similar in shape and sizes to their sourced materials. Soanian technological culture differ largely from other pre-historic culture in the region. Other cultures found in Siwalik like the Ancheulian are often described to be of bi-facial nature and focused on hand axes. The comparison between other culture of the same region has seen Soanian technology categorized as a continuation of archaic technology rather than Neolithic. This is due to Soanian culture often being isolated within the mountainous region away from plain populations who have access to more materials.

=== Perspective of the singular interval scholars ===
Scholars of the singular interval period view the Soanian technology's development as being due to the deurbanization of the Harappan culture. This group was initially thought to have had large trading networks with intricate tools, and their own scripting system. However, due to climate change during the mid-Holocene epoch, many original settlements collapsed in search of water and have been reduced in size. The group began adopting tools that were more easily accessible.

== Excavation history and current studies ==
Map of the Indian subcontinent showing important sites of the Soanian culture.

The Western Sub-Himalaya and the Siwalik Hills first caught the interest of archaeologists and palaeontologists in the early 1800s when the Miocene age fossil apes were uncovered. This led to Western scholar's interest in exploring the region for potential pre-historic cultural artifacts. The first official discovery of lithic artifacts in the Western Sub-Himalaya zone was reported in 1880 by Theobald W in a report titled: “On the discovery of a celt of Palaeolithic type in the Punjab”. Wadia and K.R.U Todd first noted discoveries in the Siwalik Hills for Paleolithic lithic occurrences. Their research influenced the academic duo of Helmut De Terra and Thomas Thomson Paterson to conduct their research in the region. De Terra and Paterson deemed the artifacts found in Siwalik belonged to a specific technological culture named “Soanian”. They did not excavate but focused on selectively collected surface materials from surrounding terraces. This work confirmed lithic occurrence specific to the region and prompted further research. Excavations later followed outside of India, taking place in Pakistan and Nepal, further confirming pre-historic culture in the Siwalik zone.

=== Modern research ===
Recent research predominantly takes place in India, led by scholars with a broader scope. As of 2006, the study area encompassed the Siwalik frontal slopes and some interior zones between the Ghaggar River to the west and the Markanda River to the east. The area is approximately 60 km long and covers an area of approximately 100 km square. Research areas in Pakistan along the Soan river have faced damages due to sewage disposal and municipal waste onto rivers.

Modern-day excavation methods have also changed from the time of De Terra. During his time, scholars focused more on assessing the scattering patterns of tools in smaller sampled regions. Modern observations due to technological developments focus on Soanian tools' occurrence as a complex behavioural system. This method entails carefully surveying and recording artifacts along vast regions, seeking to understand the spatial relationship each lithic culture has with one another. This form of observation has allowed scholars to observe the relations of the emergence of specific tools to specific geographical contexts.

Hundreds of edged pebble tools were discovered at Adiala and Khasala Kalan, about 16 km (9.9 mi) from Rawalpindi terrace on the river's bend. At Chauntra in Himachal Pradesh, hand axes and cleavers were found. Tools up to two million years old have been recovered. Many fossil-bearing rocks are exposed on the surface of the Soan River Gorge. 14 million-year-old fossils of gazelle, rhinoceros, crocodiles, giraffes and rodents have been found there. Some of these fossils are displayed at the Pakistan Museum of Natural History in Islamabad.

== See also ==
- South Asian Stone Age
- Madrasian culture
