= Kharan Fort =

Historic fortification in Balochistan

Kharan Fort خاران قلعہ
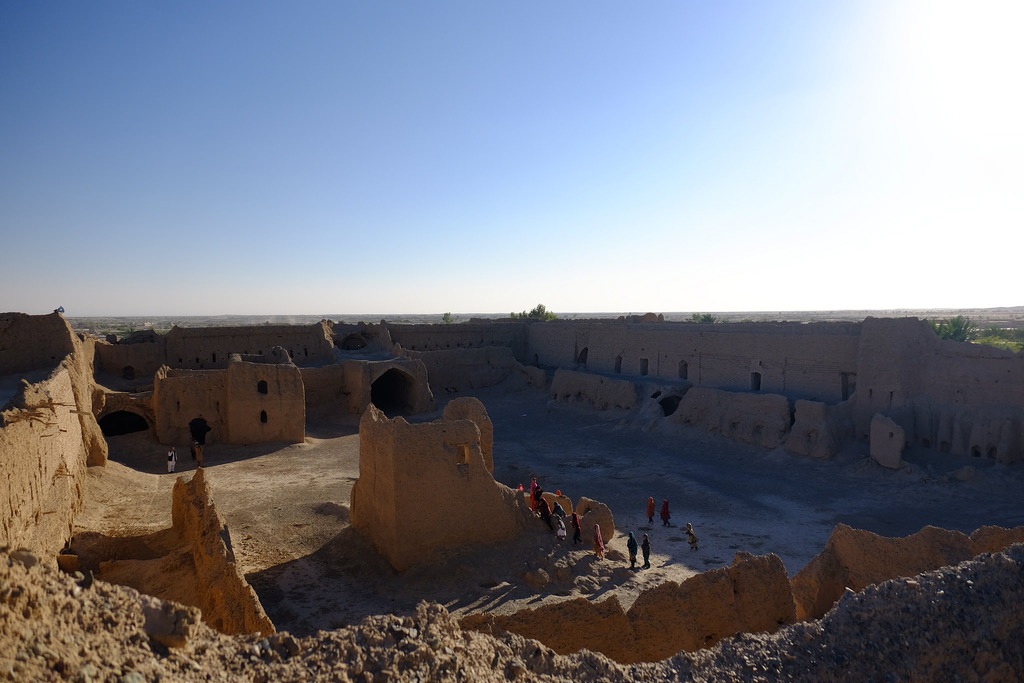
- A view of Kharan Fort
- Interactive map of the Kharan Fort خاران قلعہ area

General information
- Architectural style: Iranian
- Location: Kharan District, Pakistan
- Coordinates: 28°34′33″N 65°24′53″E
- Year built: 19th century

Kharan Fort (Balochi: خاران قلعہ, pronounced [xaːˈraːnˈqɪlɑ]) is an archaeological site featuring the remains of a fortress in Kharan District, Balochistan, Pakistan. The fortress dates to the 19th century.

== History ==
Kharan Fort was built by Azad Khan Nosherwani of Kharan Azad Khan constructed eleven fortifications around the city, bolstering its defenses against potential threats from Afghanistan, the State of Kalat, and foreign traders.

However, the fort's construction faced numerous water-related challenges that hindered progress. Repeated attempts at well and Karez construction yielded no viable water source, rendering fort construction unfeasible.

In response to these issues, a spiritual figure with ties to the chief was sought for help. The spiritual guide led Azad Khan north of Kharan to Dilkasha, an eminent location at the time, where he used his mystical wand to mark the Karez and the fort's location. Reports suggest that, following this intervention, the Karez water flow has remained consistent.

Under the spiritual guide's influence, a new construction strategy was implemented for the fort. Its design drew inspiration from Iranian architecture, utilizing sturdy burnt bricks and incorporating dome-shaped structures for added security. It is believed that the fort's building materials were transported from a location approximately six kilometers away using a human chain.

== Architecture ==
The fort was built in the Iranian style, with thick burnt bricks and dome-shaped features for security purposes. There was a mosque near the fort that is in ruins now.
