= Dabarkot =

Archaeological site in Pakistan

Dabarkot, or Dabar Kot, is a tell site of the Indus Civilization in Balochistan, Pakistan. It is situated in Duki district (North to Loralai District). The name of origin of 'Dabar kot' is due the nearby mountain known as 'Dabar' or 'Dabbar', it lies to the west of Dabar kot.

== History ==
The large city was once a trading post dating back to fifth millennium BC. Various artifacts and figurines excavated from the area show a Harappan connection of the site.

It is believed that after the Indus Civilization, the mound was destroyed and inhabited by other cultures.

== Site description ==
The Dabarkot mound is 500 yards in diameter showing the settlement was large in size and of considerable significance. Excavations from the site recovered various artifacts including stone beads, copper pieces, a gold pin, sheet metal, and large mud bricks.

== Status ==
The present day site is located in the Duki District of Balochistan and is under the federal protection under the Antiquities Act 1975.
