= Adiala =

- Road
- Adyala
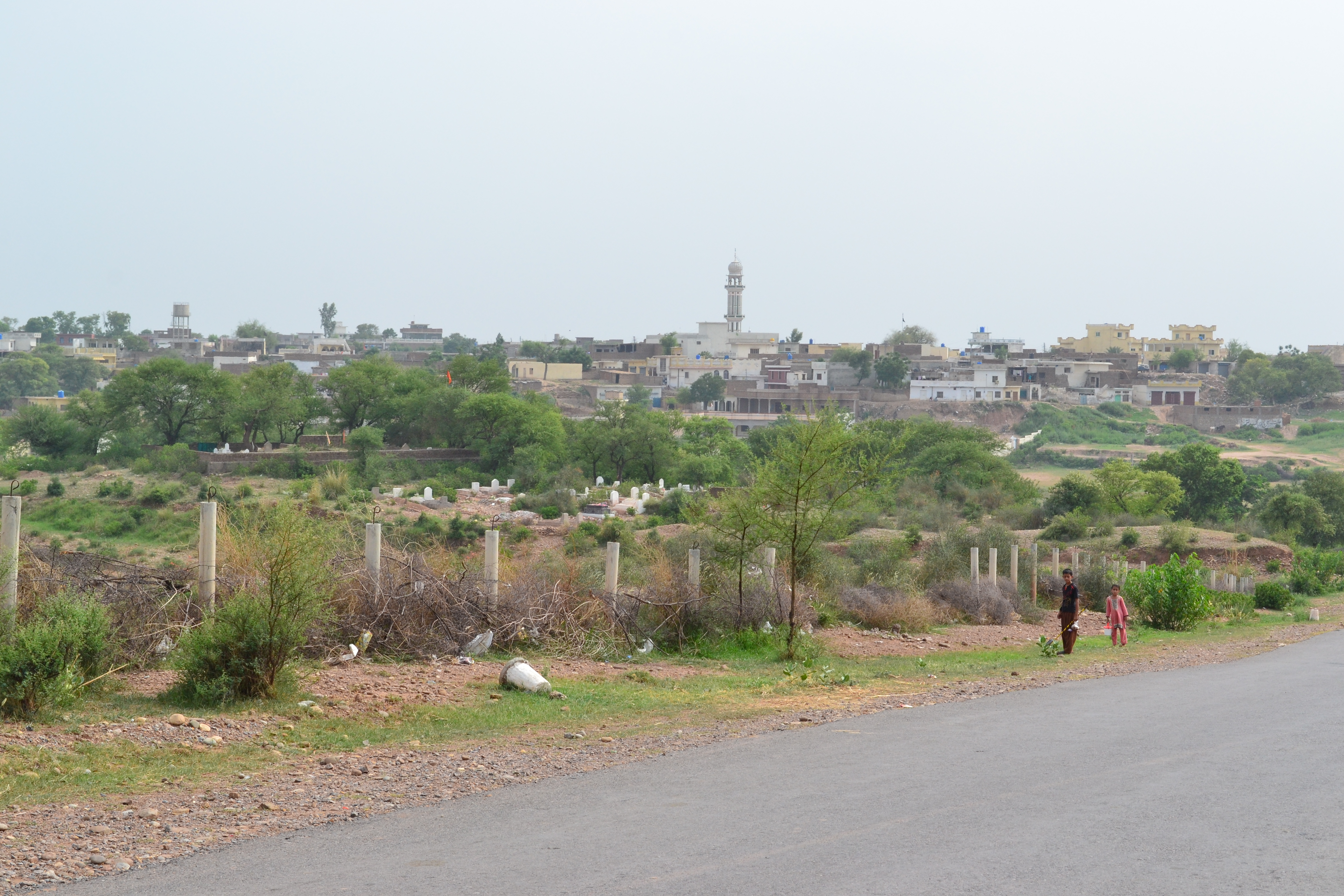
- Adiala Village in Punjab Pakistan

- Location within Pakistan
- Coordinates: 33.27°N 71.59°E
- Country: Pakistan
- Province: Punjab (Pakistan)
- District: Rawalpindi
- Elevation: 379 m (1,243 ft)
- Time zone: UTC+5 (PST)

Adiala or Adyala (Urdu: اڈیالہ) is a town of Rawalpindi District in the Punjab province of Pakistan. It is located at 33°27'30N 72°59'48E with an altitude of 379 metres (1246 ft), and lies south of the district capital, Rawalpindi. The Central Jail Rawalpindi, also known as Adiala Jail, is located about 4 km away from the Town.

== History ==
Adiala is one of the locations where pre-historic artifacts of the Soanian era (ca. 500,000 to 125,000 BP) have been discovered. People belonging to all caste live in Adiala village i.e. Raja, Jatt, Awan, Sayyed, Janjua, Gujjar, Ghauri, Malik, Chowdhry etc. Here an important thing to know is that the Jatts must not to be called as Gujjar or to be confused on any basis because they both are a very different castes on basis of status, work, culture and history. Here and in Khasala about 16 km (9.9 mi) from Rawalpindi, on the bend of the River Soan, hundreds of edged pebble tools were discovered. At Chauntra hand axes and cleavers were found.
