= Ernest Trumpp =

German missionary (1828–1885)

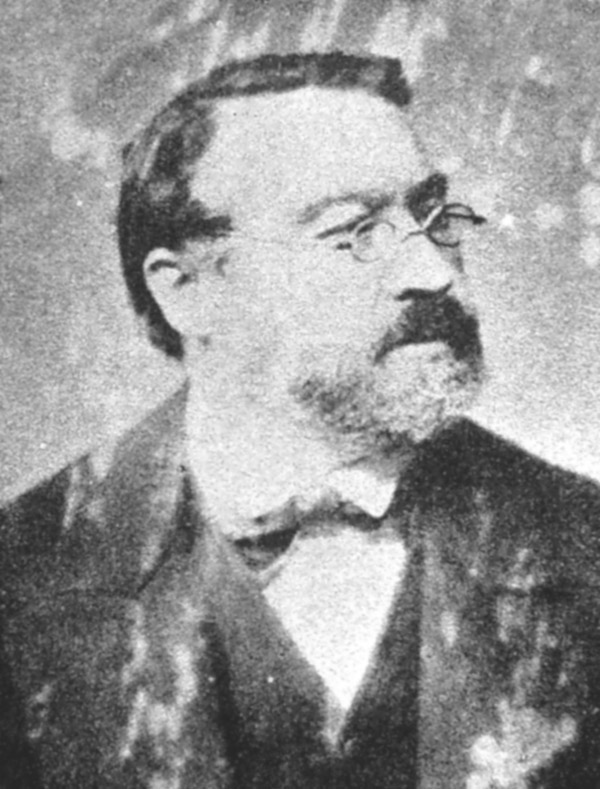
Ernest Trumpp

Ernest Trumpp (13 March 1828 – 5 April 1885), also spelt as Ernst Trumpp, was a German Christian missionary sponsored by the Ecclesiastical Mission Society. He was also German professor of Oriental Languages at the Ludwig-Maximilians-Universität München and a philologist. With an intent to convert the populace of western un-divided India to Christianity, he was seconded and sent to the Sindh and Punjab region (British India). He first came to India in the 1850s and published scholarly work on the Sindhi and other western subcontinental languages. He also worked to translate the Sikh scriptures to help Christian missionaries to understand Sikhs and thereby aid their conversion.

He authored the first Sindhi grammar entitled Sindhi Alphabet and Grammar. He also published Grammar of Pashto, or language of the Afghans, compared with the Iranian and North Indian idioms.

One of his controversial works was based on an 8-year study of the Sikh scriptures, where he attempted to philologically analyze and translate a significant portion of the Guru Granth Sahib into English in the 1870s. Trumpp was limited in his knowledge of sub-continent languages to a few that he had studied, while the Granth Sahib was composed using multiple languages of the South Asia region. His Sikh translation, especially its preface, was rejected by Sikh leadership. He also collected a number of Ethiopian and Indian manuscripts.

== Early life ==
Trumpp was born on 13 March 1828 at Ilsfeld in Wurtemberg Province (now Baden-Württemberg) in Germany. He became the Regius Professor of Oriental Languages at the Ludwig-Maximilians-Universität München and member of Royal Bavarian Academy of Sciences.

Around 1854, he arrived in India as a missionary sponsored by the Ecclesiastical Mission Society to study the languages of India and to prepare grammars and glossaries for use by Christian missionaries. There he was initially stationed at the Karachi mission, where he learnt the Sindhi language. Later, he was stationed at Peshawar, where he studied the Pashto language. He went back to Germany in 1860. In the 1870s, he was subsequently recommended by Robert Needham Cust and sought by the Secretary of State for India of the British government to return to India, and work on translations of Sikh scripture in Lahore (Punjab). He published a number of works related to Sindhi and Punjabi languages and texts throughout the 1870s.

== Career ==
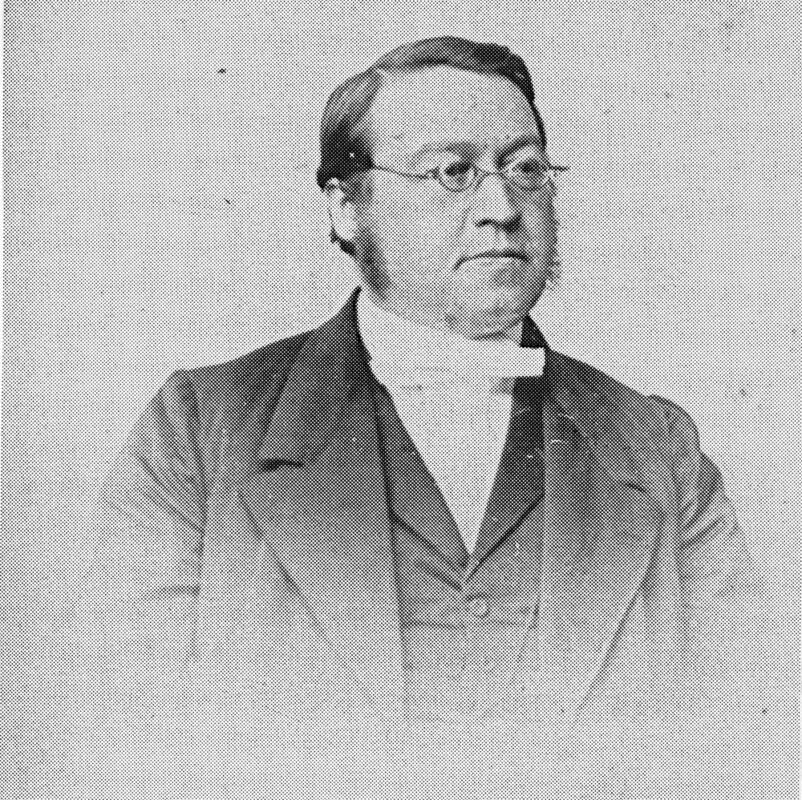
Photograph of the German missionary and linguist Dr. Ernst Trumpp, ca.1860's–80's

While at Karachi, he translated the Book of Common Prayer into the Persian language in 1858. In 1866 he edited and published Shah Jo Risalo, a poetic compendium of Shah Abdul Latif Bhittai. He published the first Sindhi grammar entitled Sindhi Alphabet and Grammar in 1872.

He published Grammar of the Pushtoo, or language of the Afghans, compared with the Iranian and North Indian idioms in 1873.

After he returned to Württemberg in 1876, he dedicated most of his energies to translation.

=== Sikh scriptures ===
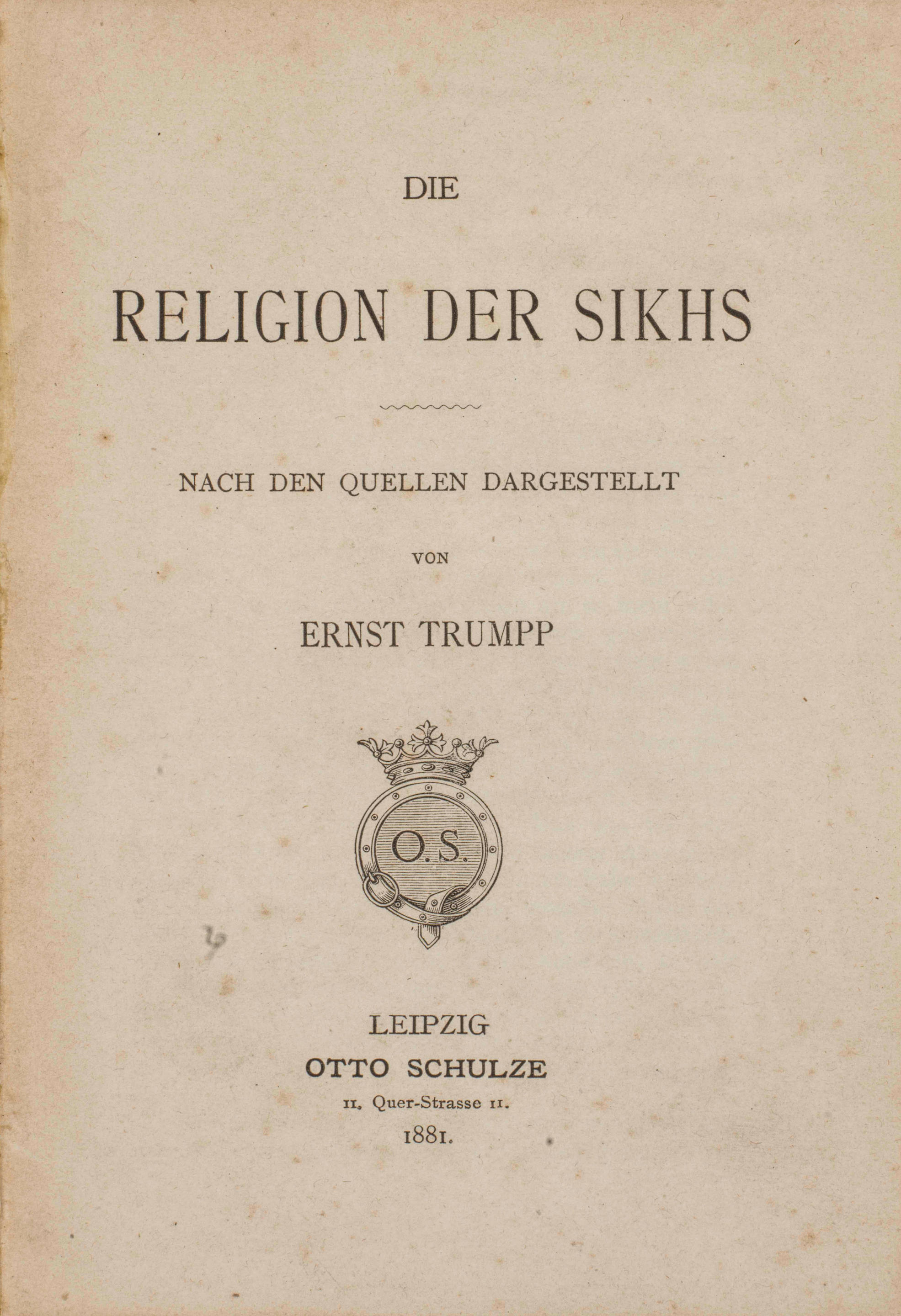
Title-page of 'Die Religion der Sikhs, nach den Quellen Dargestellt' ("The religion of the Sikhs, presented according to the sources"), by Ernest Trumpp, 1881

Robert Needham Cust, a British colonial administrator and linguist, suggested Court of Directors of the British East India Company on 12 August 1857 that India office in London should make arrangements for translation of Adi Granth into English language. Later, Robert Needham recommended Ernest Trumpp to the British government as best qualified to translate the Sikh scripture and historic literature. In 1869, Trumpp was sought by the India office of the British government to work in Punjab to translate the Sikh scriptures into English.

Trumpp enthusiastically started studying and translating them in 1870. He sought the help of local Nirmala Sikhs as he considered them more literate than other Sikh preachers. Nirmala Sikhs were students of Sanskrit who followed the Vedic traditions and their interpretations of Adi Granth were based on Vedic literature. However, after his initial effort, he stated that Sikh scriptures were not worth translating in full, because "the same few ideas, he thought, being endlessly repeated". He found that the Sikh granthis who recited the text in the early 1870s lacked comprehension and its sense of meaning. He stated that "Sikhs had lost all learning" and the granthis were misleading. Even for Sikhs the language of the Guru Granth Sahib is considered archaic and hard to understand without an interpreter. Trumpp never made any attempts to have a meaningful dialogue with Sikh scholars of the time such as Kahn Singh Nabha, who has penned the Mahan Kosh, a dictionary of words used in the Granth Sahib. According to Tony Ballantyne, Ernest Trumpp's insensitive approach such as treating the Sikh scripture as a mere book and blowing cigar smoke over its pages while studying the text, did not endear him to the Sikh granthis who worshipped it as an embodiment of the Guru.

Trumpp, after eight years of study and research of the Sikh scriptures, published his translation and field notes. In the "Introduction" section, he described the Sikh scripture as "incoherent and shallow in the extreme, and couched at the same time in dark and perplexing language, in order to cover these defects. It is for us Occidentals a most painful and almost stupefying task, to read only a single Rag". Trumpp criticized Adi Granth to be lacking systematic unity, according to Arvind Pal Singh Mandair – a Sikhism scholar. As per Frederic Pincott, Trumpp only translated 5,719 stanzas out of a total of 15,575 stanzas found in the scripture in his translation.

Trumpp said that Sikhism was "a reform movement in spirit", but "completely failed to achieve anything of real religious significance". He concluded that the most Sikhs do not understand what their scripture's verses mean and any metaphysical speculations therein. The Sikh intelligentsia he met during his years of study, stated Trumpp, only had a "partial understanding" of their own scripture. Most Sikhs neither observe the rahit-nama – the Sikh code of conduct, nor were the popular notions of the Sikhs guided by the teachings in the Adi Granth. It was more of a military brotherhood with a martial spirit, inspired by a "deep fanatical hatred" for the Muslims given the Sikh sense of their history and identity.

Trumpp's works were mostly rejected by the Sikhs, who found them offensive and misrepresentative of their faith. According to the Sikh historian Trilochan Singh, Trumpp's colonial era study and remarks were "extremely vulgar attacks" on Sikhism that did not appreciate the Sikh history, culture and religion and it reflected in the lack of a scientific-analytical method in his approach. His criticism reflected the bias of his missionary agenda, which assumed that ancient Christian scriptures were coherent, had the right answers, and that all other religions must be held in contempt. Trumpp's introduction to his translations of Adi Granth reveal that he had a contempt for the scripture and its theology, states the Sikhism scholar J. S. Grewal. Grewal stated that Trumpp was biased and prejudiced towards Sikh scriptures and institutions due to him being a Christian missionary and that he failed to accurately translate Sikh words, metaphors, and phrases. According to Indologist Mark Juergensmeyer, setting aside Ernest Trumpp's controversial remarks, he was a linguist and his years of scholarship, translations, as well as field notes and discussions have been used by contemporary scholars with caution. Criticism of Trumpp's translation was also, in part, due to discussions only with Nirmala Sikhs and not with mainstream Sikh scholars. According to Arvind-Pal Mandair, Trumpp's shortcoming was due to how he framed the Sikh religion as having to prove itself according to Western understandings.

=== Other Sikh texts ===
Folio of a cursive Gurmukhi manuscript collected by Ernst Trumpp, 1872

In the course of his research, it seems he had discovered the first known manuscript of the Puratan Janamsakhis (also spelt Janam-sakhi), the earliest known biography of Guru Nanak, at the India office Library, London. Trumpp found these manuscripts among the manuscripts forwarded to him from the India office's Library in 1872 with a note saying "in hope that some of them may be useful in the project entrusted to you." [sic] He translated Puratan and Bala Janamsakhis, the lives of the later [Sikh] gurus, including an account of their teachings.

He also penned some essays on The Life of Nanak according to the Janam Sakhis, Sketch of the Life of the other Sikh Gurus, Sketch of the Religion of the Sikhs, On the Composition of the Granth, and On the Language and the Metres used in the Granth.

== Death ==
He died in April 1885.

== Legacy ==
A symposium on German-Pakistani relations was held in his memory on the centennial of his death in 1985.

== Bibliography ==
=== German ===
- Trumpp, Ernst. „Brief an Friedrich Müller ddo. Lahore 6. März 1871“. Anthropologische Gesellschaft in Wien, Mitteilungen [Vienna], Bd. 1, Jänner 1871, S. 195.
- Trumpp, Ernst. „Die heutige Bevölkerung des Panjâb, ihre Sitten und Gebräuche“. Anthropologische Gesellschaft in Wien, Mitteilungen [Vienna], Bd. 2, Jänner 1872, S. 289.
- Trumpp, Ernst, and Kaiserliche Akademie der Wissenschaften in Wien. Sonstige. Grammar of the Pḁṣ̌tō or Language of the Afghāns : Compared with the Īrānian and North-Indian Idioms. Trübner; Heckenhauer, 1873, https://nbn-resolving.org/urn:nbn:de:gbv:3:5-78201.
- Trumpp, Ernst. Ueber den Accent und die Aussprache des Persischen. Franz, 1875, http://mdz-nbn-resolving.de/urn:nbn:de:bvb:12-bsb11698166-5.
- Trumpp, Ernst. Ueber den Zustandsausdruck in den semitischen Sprachen, speciell im Arabischen : (ein Beitrag zur vergleichenden Syntax der semitischen Sprachen). Franz, 1876, http://mdz-nbn-resolving.de/urn:nbn:de:bvb:12-bsb11698187-1.
- Ibn-Āǧurrūm, Muhammad Ibn-Muhammad, und Ernst Trumpp. Einleitung in das Studium der arabischen Grammatiker : die Ajrūmiyyah des Muḥammad bin Dāʾūd. Verlag der K. Akademie, 1876, https://nbn-resolving.org/urn:nbn:de:gbv:3:5-18948.
- Trumpp, Ernst. Nānak, der Stifter der Sikh-Religion : Festrede zur Vorfeier des Allerhöchsten Geburts- und Namensfestes Seiner Majestät Ludwig II., Königs von Bayern gehalten in der öffentlichen Sitzung der k. b. Akademie der Wissenschaften zu München am 25. Juli 1876. Verlag der k. Akademie, 1876, http://mdz-nbn-resolving.de/urn:nbn:de:bvb:12-bsb11379632-3.
- Trumpp, Ernst. Beiträge zur arabischen Syntax. Franz in Komm., 1877, http://mdz-nbn-resolving.de/urn:nbn:de:bvb:12-bsb11698204-7.
- Trumpp, Ernst. Das Taufbuch der Aethiopischen Kirche. Akad. der Wiss., 1878, http://mdz-nbn-resolving.de/urn:nbn:de:bvb:12-bsb11363807-1.
- Trumpp, Ernst. Afghânistan und die Afghânen. In: Allgemeine Zeitung 1878.
- Trumpp, Ernst. Beiträge zur Erklärung des Mufassal. 1, §§ 1-63. München, 1878, http://mdz-nbn-resolving.de/urn:nbn:de:bvb:12-bsb11698218-4.
- Trumpp, Ernst. Die ältesten Hinduī-Gedichte. Franz in Komm., 1879, http://mdz-nbn-resolving.de/urn:nbn:de:bvb:12-bsb11698235-9.
- Trumpp, Ernst. Ueber den arabischen Sazbau nach der Anschauung der arabischen Grammatiker. Franz in Komm., 1879, http://mdz-nbn-resolving.de/urn:nbn:de:bvb:12-bsb11698250-2.
- Trumpp, Ernst. Ueber den arabischen Sazbau nach der Anschauung der arabischen Grammatiker : (Aus den Sitzungsberichten der philos. - philol. Cl. der K. Akademie der Wissenschaften Jahrg. 1879 Bd. II. S. 309 - 398. München, 1880, http://mdz-nbn-resolving.de/urn:nbn:de:bvb:12-bsb11639684-5.
- Trumpp, Ernst. Der Kampf Adams (gegen die Versuchungen des Satans), oder: Das christliche Adambuch des Morgenlandes : aethiopischer Text, verglichen mit dem arabischen Originaltext. Akademie, 1880, http://mdz-nbn-resolving.de/urn:nbn:de:bvb:12-bsb11467659-7.
- Trumpp, Ernst. Grammatische Untersuchungen über die Sprache der Brāhūīs. Franz in Komm., 1880, http://mdz-nbn-resolving.de/urn:nbn:de:bvb:12-bsb11698267-6.
- Trumpp, Ernst. Grammatische Untersuchungen über die Sprache der Brāhūīs : Von Ernst Trumpp. Separat- Abdruck aus den Sitzungsberichten der k. b. Akademie der Wissenschaften, philos. - philol. Classe, Decemer 1880. F. Straub, 1881, http://mdz-nbn-resolving.de/urn:nbn:de:bvb:12-bsb11639709-9.
- Trumpp, Ernst. Der Bedingungssaz im Arabischen : (Aus den Sitzungsberichten der Philos. - philol. Classe der K. b. Akademie der Wiss. 1881 Heft 4.). München, 1882, http://mdz-nbn-resolving.de/urn:nbn:de:bvb:12-bsb11639685-0.
- Trumpp, Ernst. Der Bedingungssaz im Arabischen. Franz in Komm., 1881, http://mdz-nbn-resolving.de/urn:nbn:de:bvb:12-bsb11698285-5.
- Trumpp, Ernst. Der Kampf Adams (gegen die Versuchungen des Satans), oder: Das christliche Adambuch des Morgenlandes : aethiopischer Text, verglichen mit dem arabischen Originaltext. Akad. der Wiss., 1881, http://mdz-nbn-resolving.de/urn:nbn:de:bvb:12-bsb11732540-9.
- Trumpp, Ernst. Die Religion der Sikhs : nach den Quellen dargestellt. Schulze, 1881, http://mdz-nbn-resolving.de/urn:nbn:de:bvb:12-bsb11615163-5.
- Epiphanius, and Ernst Trumpp. Das Hexaëmeron des Pseudo-Epiphanius : aethiopischer Text, verglichen mit dem arabischen Originaltext und deutscher Uebersetzung. München, 1882, https://publikationen.badw.de/de/008530006.
- Trumpp, Ernst. Beiträge zur Erklärung des Mufassal. 2, §§ 64-246. München, 1884, http://publikationen.badw.de/008530066.
- Trumpp, Ernst. Beitrag zur Uebersetzung und Erklärung des Mufassal. Akademische Buchdruckerei von F. Straub, 1884, https://nbn-resolving.org/urn:nbn:de:gbv:3:5-20103.
- Kampf Adams.
- Das Taufbuch der Aethiopischen Kirche: Aetiopisch und Deutsch.
- Einleitung in das Studium der Arabischen Grammatiker.

=== English ===
- Trumpp, Ernst. A Sindhi Reading-Book in the Sanscrit and Arabic Character : Compiled by the Rev. Ernest Trumpp. Printed for the Church Missionary Society, Durchschossenes Exemplar, 1858, http://mdz-nbn-resolving.de/urn:nbn:de:bvb:12-bsb10572588-8.
- Grammar to the Ādi Granth (c. 1870s) by Ernest Trumpp [Trumpp, Ernst. “Grammar to the Ādi Granth - BSB Cod.panj. 3.” S.l, 1869, http://mdz-nbn-resolving.de/urn:nbn:de:bvb:12-bsb00052295-9.]
- Trumpp, Ernst. Grammar of the Sindhi Language : Compared with the Sanskrit-Prakrit and the Cognate Indian Vernaculars. Trübner, Brockhaus, 1872, http://mdz-nbn-resolving.de/urn:nbn:de:bvb:12-bsb11007508-7.
- The Ādi-Granth, or: The Holy Scriptures of the Sikhs, Translated from the Original Gurmukhī, with Introductory Essays (London: WM. H. Allen & Co. & N. Trübner & Co., 1877) by Ernst Trumpp
- Dictionary of Bengali Language 2 Vols.

== Manuscripts collected by him ==
- Hāymānota abaw [= Glaube der Väter]- Äthiopische Handschrift - BSB Cod.aethiop. 35; ሃይማኖተ፡ በው። (c. 1701–1750)
- Äthiopische theologische Sammelhandschrift - BSB Cod.aethiop. 33
- Äthiopische theologische Sammelhandschrift - BSB Cod.aethiop. 56 (1836–1837)
- Das Hexaëmeron des Pseudo-Epiphanius - BSB Cod.aethiop. 60 (c. 1875)
- Maṣḥafa faws manfasāwi [= Buch der geistlichen Medizin]. - Äthiopische Handschrift - BSB Cod.aethiop. 57; መጽሐፈ፡ ፈውስ፡ መንፈሳዊ። (c. 1850–1885)
- Gadla Adām [= Die Vita des Adam]. - Äthiopische Handschrift - BSB Cod.aethiop. 58; ገድለ፡ አዳም። (c. 1850–1885)
- Maṣḥafa krǝstǝnnā [= Buch der Taufe, d.h. das Taufrituale]; መጽሐፈ፡ ክርስትና።
- Baluci-Handschrift - BSB Cod.Bal. 1 (12 January 1861)
- Commentary to the Ādi Granth - BSB Cod.panj. 4 (1871)
- Commentary to the Ādi Granth - BSB Cod.panj. 5. (1871)
- Commentary to the Ādi Granth - BSB Cod.panj. 6
- Gur Ratan Mal - BSB Cod.panj. 9 (c. mid-19th century)
- Sākhīs (Geschichten) of the ten Gurus - Rahit-nāmā (frema Śumār) - BSB Cod.panj. 11 [manuscript of Sakhis and the Prem Sumarag] (1872)
- Kurzer Text in Gurmukhi-Schrift - BSB Cod.panj. 13 (1872)

== See also ==
- List of East India Company directors
- East India House in London, later renamed India office
- Conflict of Adam and Eve with Satan – Editions and Translations
