= Twarikh Guru Khalsa =

Sikh history book (1885)

Twarikh Guru Khalsa ਤਵਾਰੀਖ ਗੁਰੂ ਖਾਲਸਾ
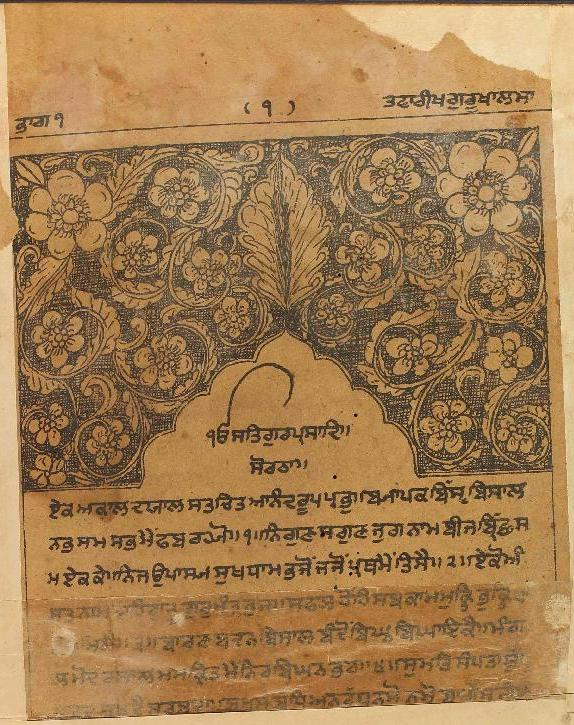
- Opening folio of a manuscript of the 'Twarikh Guru Khalsa'
- Author: Giani Gian Singh
- Language: Punjabi
- Genre: Sikh history
- Published: 1885

Twarikh Guru Khalsa (Punjabi: ਤਵਾਰੀਖ ਗੁਰੂ ਖਾਲਸਾ, romanized: Tavārīkha gurū khālasā, lit. 'History of Guru Khalsa') or Tawarikh-i-Guru Khalsa, is a historical book of the Sikhs from their origin to the time when they lost the Punjab to the British. The author of the book is Giani Gian Singh. Both Punjabi and Urdu editions of the work were published.

== History ==
This work was the second major work of Giani Gian Singh, who had earlier published his Panth Prakash in 1880. It is the first work of Gian Singh written in Punjabi prose. It was first published in 1885, with the author having access to the works of Kavi Santokh Singh and Ratan Singh Bhangu. According to Sant Singh Sekhon, the first three parts of the original Punjabi work (in five parts total) by Giani Gian Singh was published in 1892 at Sialkot by Rajinder Singh, owner of the Guru Gobind Singh Press. Sarita Rana claims it was published a year earlier in 1891 with the assistance of Mahant Prem Singh, Hari Singh of Sialkot, and Bula Singh of Rawalpindi. The Punjabi publication would be following by three Urdu editions of three parts titled Twarikh Guru Khalsa, Shamsher Khalsa and Raj Khalsa. Publication rights were transferred by the author to the Khalsa Tract Society. A later Punjabi edition was published by the Language Department, Punjab, Patiala in 1970.

== Structure ==
The Punjabi work is divided into five parts:

- Janam Sakhi Dasari Guruari presents biographies of the Sikh gurus and the Sikh community's history during their period
- Shamsher Khalsa deals with the career of Banda Singh Bahadur and the persecution of the Sikhs by the ruling administrations
- Raj Khalsa describes the rise of the twelve misls and the polity of Ranjit Singh until the British annexation
- Sardar Khalsa contained accounts of Sikh principalities and communities
- Panth Khalsa treats of Sikh sects, gurdwaras, masands, manjidars, and preaching centres.

The Urdu version is divided into three parts:

- Twarikh Guru Khalsa
- Shamsher Khalsa
- Raj Khalsa

== Narratives ==
The book contains an account of the purported heresies of Banda Singh Bahadur that caused a schism between him and Mata Sundari, the widow of Guru Gobind Singh. It also reports the myth of Mian Mir laying the first brick during the construction of the Golden Temple at Amritsar.

== See also ==
- Suraj Prakash
- Mahan Kosh
