= Prem Singh Hoti =

Sikh writer and historian

Bawa Prem Singh Hoti (2 November 1882 – 10 January 1954) was a Sikh writer and historian active during the Singh Sabha movement. He is noted for his biographical works covering historical Sikh military and political figures. He focused his research primarily on the Sarkar-e-Khalsa (Sikh Empire), documenting the lives of Maharaja Ranjit Singh, his family, and his generals. He was also known by the appellation Mithe Baba Ji ("Sweet Baba Ji"). At-least a dozen works authored by him are known and he served as president of the Sikh Historical Society.

== Early life and family background ==
Prem Singh was born on 2 November 1882 to parents Bawa Ganda Singh and Bibi Kushalia in Hoti Mardan, North-West Frontier Province to a Bhalla family that traced their ancestry to Guru Amar Das and Goindwal. Prem Singh's ancestor Kahn Singh had moved to the western frontier region during the reign of Maharaja Ranjit Singh. The family had been awarded a jagir in the region. The British confiscated the jagir after their annexation of the empire in 1849 but the Muslim chieftain (Nawab) of Hoti, Buland Khan, restored the jagir to the family and acted as their patrons, with the chieftain giving the patriarch of the family the Kar-Mukhtar (Chief Manager) position. Prem Singh was educated in Sikh theology and folklore growing-up and had an interest in Sikh heroism. He learnt Gurmukhi and Santhiya (gurbani elocution) at home and at the gurdwara. He additionally studied Urdu and Persian at a madrasa. Due to being raised in a Pashtun-area, Prem Singh acquired Pashto as his native-language. Prem Singh also had some ability in English, Hindi, and Sanskrit. Prem Singh's father Ganda Singh served as the Nazim (administrator) for Buland Khan until his death in 1903, with Prem Singh taking the former position of his late father, serving as the Nazamat.

== Career ==
Prem Singh became influenced by the on-going religious, marriage, and educational reforms of the Singh Sabha movement, especially by the Chief Khalsa Diwan. Prem Singh began authoring poems that were published in the Khalsa Samachar. From 1909 to 1947, Prem Singh performed katha (religious discouse lectures) at the gurdwara in Hoti. Many sehajdhari families underwent the pahul and became Khalsa due to his preaching, which he conducted at Hoti Mardan, Garhi, Rustam, Dhundera, Jehangir, Akora Khattak, Nowshera, and Peshawar. Prem Singh introduced the standardized code of conduct (Gurmaryada) and the formalized Sikh wedding ceremony (Anand Karaj) in his area where he was active in his missionary work. Prem Singh's son died due to an illness.

At the first Sikh Educational Conference held in Gujranwala between 18 and 19 April 1908, Prem Singh met Bhai Vir Singh, which motivated him to pursue a scholarly career-path and Prem Singh began focusing more on Sikh history. Prem Singh welcomed Vir Singh to his homeland, where Yousafzai and Barakzai Pashtuns lived, and showed him monuments dedicated to Sikhs (such as the memorial of Phula Singh) and the Nawab's library. Vir Singh, recognizing the historical importance of Prem Singh's homeland, then advised Prem Singh to write biographies on Sikh figures connected to his region. Prem Singh then authored various books on historical Sikh figures over the years, such as Phula Singh (Jiwan Birtant Baba Phulla Singh Akali, 1914), Ranjit Singh (1918), Nau Nihal Singh (1927), Hari Singh Nalwa (1937), Sher Singh (1951), Nawab Kapur Singh (1952). He started but never completed his works covering Bhai Gurdas, Sukha Singh, and Duleep Singh. Prem Singh was also a contemporary of Giani Gian Singh, another Sikh writer. In 1937, the personal library of Prem Singh contained 1,840 rare books in Punjabi, English, Hindi, Urdu, and Persian languages, 130 manuscripts, 60 coins from various princely states, and a collection of 200 photographs. In 1939, he was appointed as the president of the Sikh Historical Society.

Aside from dedicated biographical works on single personalities, he also authored works containing numerous biographies, such as his Khālsā Rāj de Usrayye ("Builders of the Khalsa Raj", Vol. I in 1942 and Vol. II in 1944), and Khālsā Rāj de Badesī Kārinde ("Foreign employees of the Sikh Kingdom", 1945). In 1948 after the partition of Punjab, his family shifted to Shimla and then to Patiala in 1949.

== Later life and death ==
Prem Singh was offered land in Abdulapur, Pinjore by Gian Singh Rarewala to support him but Prem Singh declined the offer. In 1949, he donated 1,500 rare books to Panjab University due to a request by Vice-Chancellor Diwan Anand Kumar and Bodh Raj Malhotra. Prem Singh was honoured by the Punjabi Department of PEPSU in 1952. Prem Singh died in Patiala on 10 January 1954. His remaining collection was donated all to Panjab University by his family after his death. A work of his was post-humously published in 1979.

== Bibliography ==
These are the works authored by Prem Singh:

- Singh, Prem (1914). Jīvana britānta bābā phūlā sigha akālī ਜੀਵਨ ਬ੍ਰਿਤਾਂਤ ਬਾਬਾ ਫੂਲਾ ਸਿੰਘ ਅਕਾਲੀ [Life of Baba Phula Singh Akali] (in Punjabi).
- Singh, Prem (1918). Jīvana britānta mahārājā raṇajīta sigha ਜੀਵਨ ਬ੍ਰਿਤਾਂਤ ਮਹਾਰਾਜਾ ਰਣਜੀਤ ਸਿੰਘ [Life of Maharaja Ranjit Singh] (in Punjabi).
- Singh, Prem (1927). Jīvana britānta kavara naunihāla sigha ਜੀਵਨ ਬ੍ਰਿਤਾਂਤ ਕੰਵਰ ਨੌਨਿਹਾਲ ਸਿੰਘ [Life of Kanwar Nau Nihal Singh] (in Punjabi).
- Singh, Prem (1937). Jīvana britānta harī sigha nalū'ā ਜੀਵਨ ਬ੍ਰਿਤਾਂਤ ਹਰੀ ਸਿੰਘ ਨਲੂਆ [Life of Hari Singh Nalwa] (in Punjabi).
- Singh, Prem (1942). Khālasā rāja dē usara'ī'ē ( bhāga pahilā ਖਾਲਸਾ ਰਾਜ ਦੇ ਉਸਰਈਏ ( ਭਾਗ ਪਹਿਲਾ [Builders of the Khalsa Raj, Vol. 1] (in Punjabi).
- Singh, Prem (1944). Khālasā rāja dē usara'ī'ē ( bhāga dūjā ਖਾਲਸਾ ਰਾਜ ਦੇ ਉਸਰਈਏ ( ਭਾਗ ਦੂਜਾ [Builders of the Khalsa Raj, Vol. 2] (in Punjabi).
- Singh, Prem (1945). Khālasā rāja dē badēsī kāridē ਖਾਲਸਾ ਰਾਜ ਦੇ ਬਦੇਸੀ ਕਾਰਿੰਦੇ [Foreign Employees of the Khalsa Raj] (in Punjabi).
- Singh, Prem (1951). Jīvana britānta mahārājā śēra sigha ਜੀਵਨ ਬ੍ਰਿਤਾਂਤ ਮਹਾਰਾਜਾ ਸ਼ੇਰ ਸਿੰਘ [Life of Maharaja Sher Singh] (in Punjabi).
- Singh, Prem (1952). Jīvana britānta navāba kapūra sigha ਜੀਵਨ ਬ੍ਰਿਤਾਂਤ ਨਵਾਬ ਕਪੂਰ ਸਿੰਘ [Life of Nawab Kapur Singh] (in Punjabi).
- Singh, Prem. Śahiradārī tē paipasū dā sakhēpa itihāsa ਸ਼ਹਿਰਦਾਰੀ ਤੇ ਪੈਪਸੂ ਦਾ ਸੰਖੇਪ ਇਤਿਹਾਸ [Brief History of Shahrdari [Municipal Administration/Civic Governance] and PEPSU [Patiala and the East Punjab States Union]] (in Punjabi).
- Singh, Prem. Mōhana pōthī'āṁ bārē ਮੋਹਨ ਪੋਥੀਆਂ ਬਾਰੇ [Regarding the Mohan Pothis] (in Punjabi).
- Singh, Prem (1979). Pajāba dā samājika itihāsa ਪੰਜਾਬ ਦਾ ਸਮਾਜਿਕ ਇਤਿਹਾਸ [Social History of Punjab] (in Punjabi).
