= Naveen Panth Prakash =

Sikh text (1880)

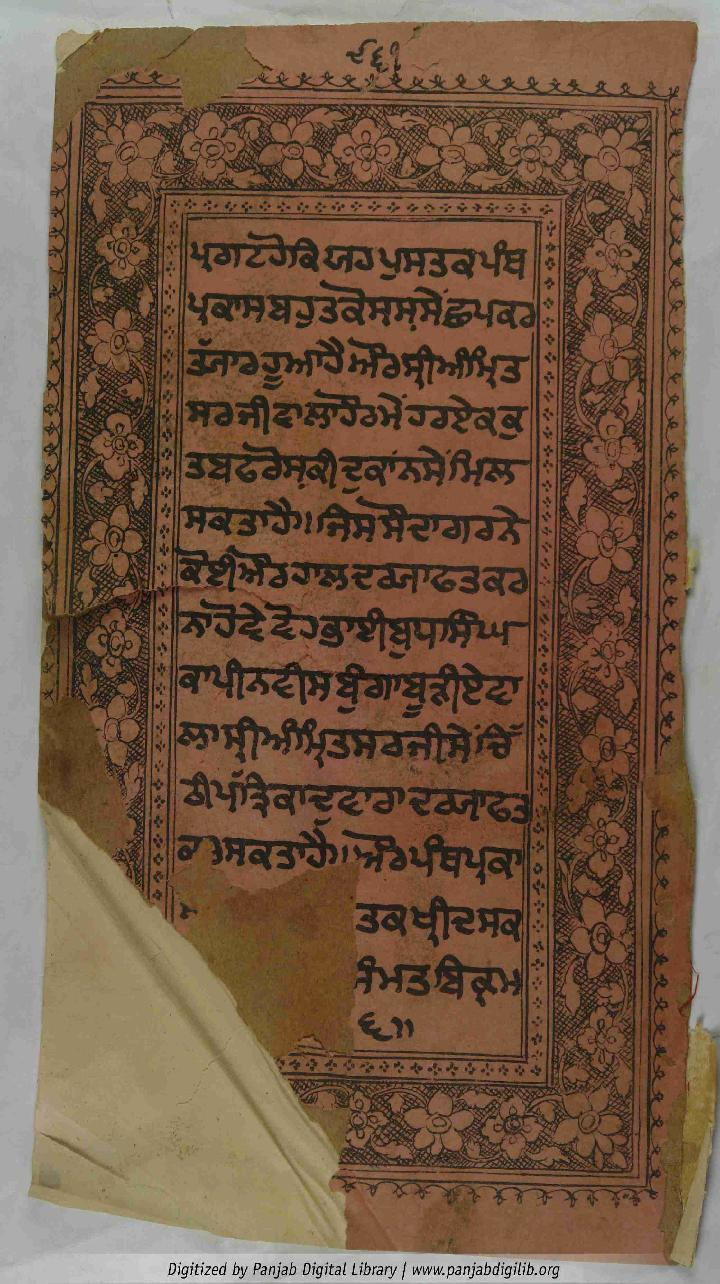
Ending folio of an early edition of Giani Gian Singh's Panth Prakash

Panth Prakash or Sri Guru Panth Prakash, usually titled Naveen Panth Prakash to distinguish it from an earlier work with the same title, is a Sikh text by Giani Gian Singh written in 1880. The language of the work is Braj. The text is written in verse form rather than prose and covers the history of Sikhism, with a focus on the Guru Panth or the Khalsa.

== Description ==
This work is the first major, independent work attributed to Giani Gian Singh. The text formed as Giani Gian Singh's re-working on the Panth Prakash that had been written by Rattan Singh Bhangu earlier. Gian Singh felt that Bhangu had excluded the history of the Malwai Sikhs from his work, thus he felt the need to write his own Panth Prakash that told their stories. Gian Singh also felt that the poetry in Bhangu's work was lacking, thus he aimed to write a work with better poetics. Giani Gian Singh had originally been instructed to write the work upon the advice of his teacher, Tara Singh Narotam. Gian Singh also requested permission from the Sikh community to write the work. According to Sarita Rana, the work was originally written between 1865–1867. However, the work was first published in Delhi in 1880. An enlarged 2nd edition was published in Lahore by Diwan Buta Singh. However, Giani Gian Singh and Diwan Buta Singh had a rift form between them, so Gian Singh decided to have his 3rd and 4th editions printed by Kaka Singh Sadhu at Amritsar. Gian Singh had gotten ill when he was working on the 2nd edition of the work so publication and printing had been suspended but Buta Singh still published the work, much expanded compared to the first edition.

The work covers the period of the Sikh gurus, starting with Nanak, and ends its account at the death of Duleep Singh. Gian Singh also provided his account on the contemporary period he wrote in in-regards to the social situation and wrote some information about himself. Its final section covers thirteen Sikh sects, such as the Udasis, Nirmalas, Akali-Nihangs, Sewapanthis/Addanshahis, Namdharis, Hindalis/Niranjanias, Suthre Shahis/Suthrashahis, Gulabdasias, Sat Kartarias/Satkartarias, Hindalis, Hiradasias, Gangushahis, and the sects of Bhai Mula (Bhai Mul Chandias) and Bhai Behlo.

== Editions ==
The editions of the text are as follows:

- 1st edition (Delhi: 1880), lithograph with 65 bisrams (chapters/sections) and 715 pages, covering the same subjects as Rattan Singh Bhangu's Panth Prakash
- 2nd edition (Lahore: Matba ' Āftāb, 1889, in two volumes), lithograph with 1,418 pages total, much expanded edition compared to the original edition.
- 3rd edition (Amritsar: Matba' Chashm-i-Nūr, 1889), lithograph with 73 chapters and 960 pages, with the first 533 pages being a copy of the initial Delhi edition, with some minor changes.
- 4th edition (Amritsar: Wazir-i-Hind Press, 1898), with 115 chapters and 1,085 pages, with two later reprints by the Khalsa Tract Society. In 1970, Punjab Languages Department, Patiala published a reprint of the work.
- 5th edition (1970, in five volumes), a revised and annotated edition of the work prepared by Giani Kirpal Singh

== Translations ==
The text has not been fully translated into English yet. However, translations of select passages of the text can be found at manglacharan.com.

== Sources consulted ==
Giani Gian Singh lists twenty-three sources in the text that he utilized to author the work, with some sources namely being:

- Pracheen Panth Prakash by Rattan Singh Bhangu
- Tawarikh-i-Punjab by Bute Shah
- Suraj Prakash by Santokh Singh
- Gurbilas Dasvin Patshahi
- Bansavalinama Dasan Patshahian Ka
- Dabestan-e Mazaheb
- Siyar-ul-Mutakhirin

== Legacy ==
The work is a 19th century Sikh perspective of their history, with the author, who invoked the Sikh gurus and the Granth and Panth within the work, claiming it to be a factual and sympathetic account of Sikh history. The work is taught in Sikh gurdwaras and plays an important role in the Sikh understanding of their history. According to Sant Singh Sekhon, the work was not written by a critical historian but rather a traditionalist religious scholar who attempted to aggrandize Sikh history and the community in-general. He casts doubt on some of the events, information, and dates recorded in the work despite them finding wide-spread acceptance and use by the community.
