= Giani Gian Singh =

Punjabi scholar and historian (1822–1921)

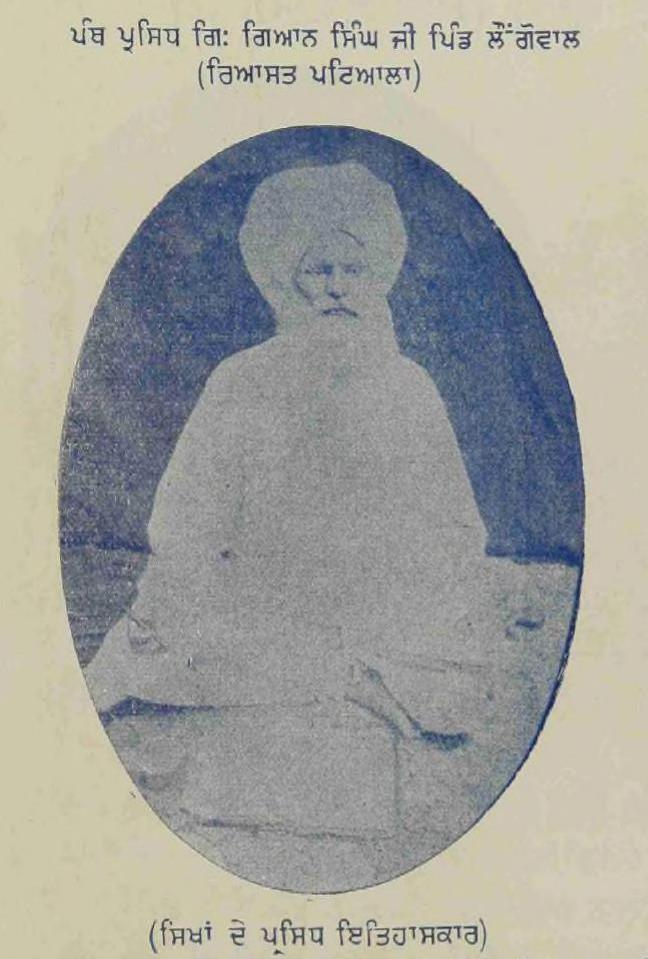
- Photograph of Giani Gian Singh
- Born: 15 April 1822
- Died: 24 September 1921 (aged 99)
- Known for: Sikh literati
- Notable work: Panth Prakash; Twarikh Guru Khalsa
- Children: Bhai Sardul Singh Giani

Giani Gian Singh (15 April 1822 – 24 September 1921) was a 19th-century Sikh historian, literatus, hagiographer, martial artist, theologian, and scholar. Gian Singh wrote over a dozen books on history. Among his most well-known works are the Naveen Panth Prakash (Note: The original title of the work was 'Panth Prakash', it is not to be confused with an earlier work with the same name by Ratan Singh Bhangu, in-which it is differentiated from it by the addition of the word 'Naveen' meaning "new" before the title.) and Twarikh Guru Khalsa. He also wrote works dedicated to Amritsar, Lahore, and Bagrian. Gian Singh, who was a disciple of Tara Singh Narotam, was a theologian and preacher of the Nirmala sect. He lived a long-life, spanning nearly a century, being an eyewitness to the decline of the Sikh Empire and subsequent British colonization of the Punjab.

== Early life ==
He was born on 15 April 1822 into a Jat family of the Dullat clan in Longowal village in present-day Sangrur district, Punjab to parents Bhag Singh and Desan. Gian Singh claimed to be descended from Bhai Mani Singh's brother, Nagahia Singh. He learnt Gurmukhi at his village from Bhola Singh and learnt Sanskrit from Atma Ram. The young Gian Singh had a talent for singing and reciting gurbani.

When he was twelve, Gian Singh moved to Lahore with his maternal uncle Karam Singh, who was serving as a subedar in the military of the Sikh Empire. When at Lahore, Dhanna Singh Malwai introduced Gian Singh to Maharaja Ranjit Singh, where he was given the responsibility of reciting the Sukhmani Sahib prayer every morning. He received education from Giani Ram Singh at Lahore. Later, Gian Singh moved back to his village and began serving in the revenue office of Patiala State, replacing his uncle Hari Singh for the role who had died in 1841. He also was working as a granthi for Patiala. During the First Anglo-Sikh War (1845–46), Patiala was pro-British, and Gian Singh was dispatched to Mudki, where he was responsible for mail distribution. In 1849, Gian Singh received an injury to his leg due to a rebellion occurring that affected Patiala and Jind states, thus he had to quit his job in the civil service.

== Career ==
After this, Gian Singh travelled around India for pilgrimage, especially visiting sites related to Sikhism. Due to the 1857 rebellion, Gian Singh returned to the Punjab and became a student of Tara Singh Narotam. Gian Singh received his training and education from Tara Singh Narotam. Gian Singh was sponsored by Maharaja Narinder Singh and assisted Pundit Tara Singh Narotam for his work in writing the Sri Guru Tirath Sangreh. Gian Singh also assisted Tara Singh Narotam with his Guru Girarath Kos, which was a lexicon of the Guru Granth Sahib, as Gian Singh travelled to Patiala to take notes of the discourses of blind-scholar Giani Chanda Singh Surama of Amritsar.

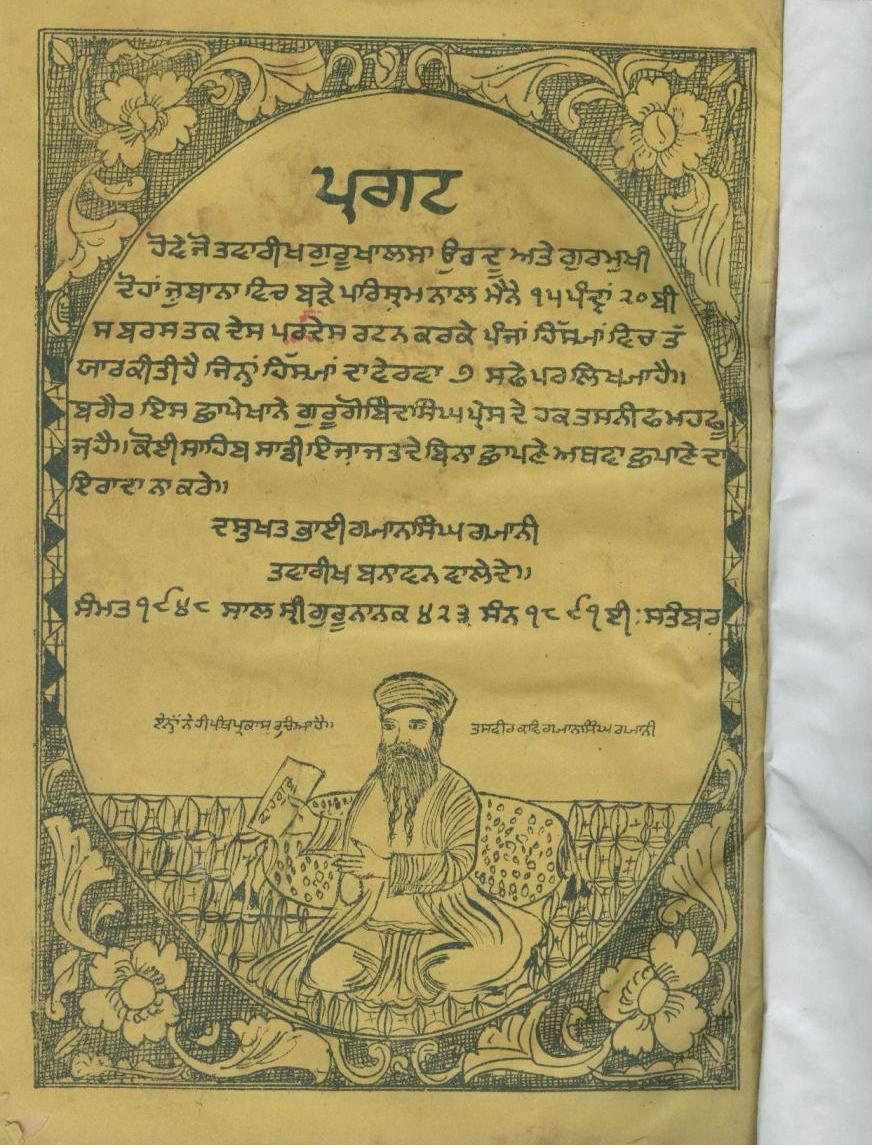
Lithograph depiction of the Sikh scholar Giani Gian Singh, circa 19th century

His independent literary career officially began in 1880 with the publication of the Panth Prakash. His Panth Prakash was written in Braj verse and covers the history of the Sikhs. His first work would be followed by the Twarikh Guru Khalsa, in five parts, with the first three parts being published in 1892. It was meant to be a simplification of the Suraj Parkash by Kavi Santokh Singh, which had been written in Braj verse that was difficult to decode. He also authored a prose, abridged version of the Suraj Prakash known as the Suraj Prakash Vartak. His work Itihas Ryasit Bagrian covers the Bagrian family and the history of the Malwa region. Some information on contemporary Sikh sects can only be found in the works of Gian Singh. Gian Singh used a variety of sources to author his works, such as oral traditions, rumours, interviewing elders, consulting pre-existing sources and works, obtaining documents and information at Benaras, Patiala, and Kapurthala, and his own personal recollections.

After coming down with an illness, Gian Singh transferred the rights to his unpublished manuscripts and published works to the Khalsa Tract Society for a 12 rupee per month allowance. Eventually, Gian Singh returned to Patiala after recovering from his sickness. At Patiala again, he received state-patronage and was responsible for solemnizing the wedding of Maharaja Bhupinder Singh of Patiala on 9 March 1908.

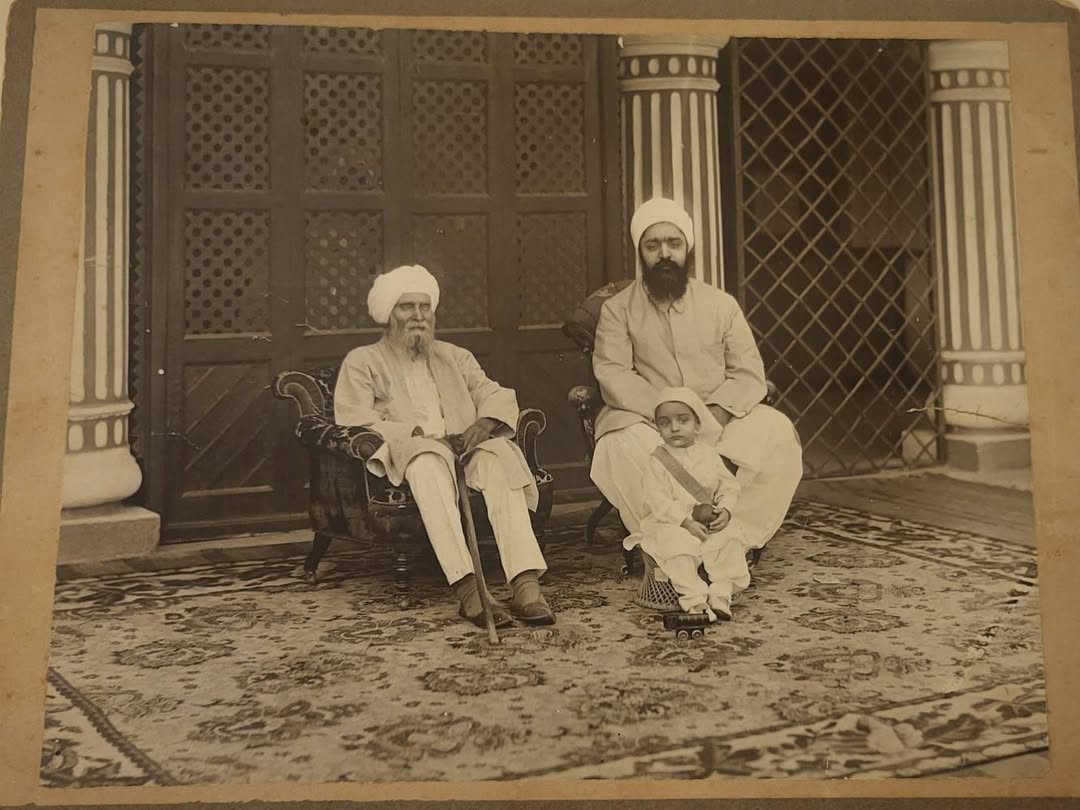
Photograph of Giani Gian Singh with Maharaja Ripudaman Singh of Nabha State and the child Pratap Singh of Nabha State, ca.1919–21

Gian Singh was a celibate, thus he chose his relative Giani Hamir Singh as his heir, who he was related to via his niece Pradhan Kaur. In 1916, he created a will that established a committee, consisting of Bhai Arjan Singh of Bagrian, Gurnam Singh, Kahn Singh of Nabha, and Gajjan Singh of Ludhiana, to publish his remaining writings. The same year on 15 August 1916, the ruling Patiala monarch, Bhupinder Singh, formulated the Historical Society's constitution with Hamir Singh as secretary for the publication of Gian Singh's works and by other authors, further bestowing a 135,000 rupee grant for their function and allowing their usage of the state's press. But, a feud between the princely-states of Patiala and Nabha had made the work of the group stall. Both Patiala and Nabha wanted Gian Singh to work under their patronage, which brought difficulty upon Gian Singh as two princely-states vied for him. Patiala claimed Gian Singh due to his early presence in the state but Nabha claimed him based upon blood-line, as Maharaja Ripudaman Singh's mother was a native of the same home-village of Longowal that Gian Singh was from. The last work Gian Singh authored between April 1921 – September 1921 was likely his Gurdham Sangrah, which covers historical Sikh temples, shrines, relics, and other sites. He may have been requested by to write this work by Maharaja Bhupinder Singh of Patiala and Maharaja Ripudham Singh of Nabha.

== Death ==
One night, Gian Singh was abducted from Patiala and brought to Nabha via a car. Gian Singh died in Nabha on 24 September 1921. His work Ripudaman Parkash, covering Maharaja Ripudaman Singh of Nabha, was published posthumously. It was originally meant to be five volumes but Giani Gian Singh died before finishing the other four volumes. His son Bhai Sardul Singh Giani assisted Max Arthur Macauliffe with his research on Sikhism.

== Legacy ==
Giani Gian Singh is credited with establishing a tradition of Sikh historiographical writing in prose rather than verse. Furthermore, he initiated writing history in Punjabi, while before him most historical works were authored in English or Persian. His works are useful for understanding the political, social, caste, religious, and cultural dynamics from the 18th to early 20th century. Gian Singh was an advocate for the rights and freedom of Sikh women.

Gian Singh reintroduced novel understandings about the compilation of the primary Sikh scriptural canon, the Guru Granth Sahib, by suggesting it was compiled through the collecting of various works by the previous gurus held by various, distant Sikh congregations, a process that took years. His late 19th century work standardized the belief that 1699 was the year that the Khalsa was founded, despite earlier 18th century Sikh sources placing its foundation between 1689–1698.

== Bibliography ==
- Tawarikh Amritsar (Urdu and Punjabi) - account on the history of the holy city of Sikhism, including the construction of the Golden Temple. First editions in both Punjabi and Urdu were published by Bhai Gurdas Singh, with a second edition published by Kendri Sri Guru Singh Sabha, Amritsar in 1977.
- Tawarikh Lahore (Urdu)
- Twarikh Guru Khalsa (Sialkot: Guru Gobind Singh Press, 1892, Punjabi, in five parts), including the following Urdu editions of three of its parts:
  - Tawarikh Guru Khalsa (Urdu)
  - Shamsher Khalsa (Urdu)
  - Raj Khalsa (Urdu)
- Naveen Panth Prakash (1880) - covering the history of the Sikhs
- Suraj Prakash Vartak - abridged version in prose of Santokh Singh's volumnius work in verse
- Ramayan Bhai Mani Singh Ji Di
- Patit Pavan
- Gurdham Sangrah (April 1921 – September 1921) - covering historical Sikh temples, shrines, and relics
- Bhupendranand - covering the wedding ceremonies of Maharaja Bhupendra Singh of Patiala
- Itihas Bagarin - covering the Bagrian family and Malwa region
- Ripudaman Prakash - covering Maharaja Ripudaman Singh of Nabha, only one volume was published of the planned five volumes due to Gian Singh's death

== See also ==
- Ratan Singh Bhangu
- Pundit Tara Singh Narotam
- Kavi Santokh Singh
