= Jvala Singh =

Sikh linguist and researcher

Jvala Singh, born Sukh Sembhi, is a Sikh linguist and researcher on Braj and Punjabi literature. A major focus of his is creating English translations of pre-colonial Sikh literature to increase their availability to present-day Sikhs. Jvala Singh has been educated through both traditional sampardic and academic institutional means. He specializes in Sikh history, scripture, poetry, and grammar.

== Biography ==
Jvala completed his Master of Arts (M.A.) at the University of Toronto, where he focused on Braj literature produced by Sikhs covering Sanskrit epics, such as the Ramayana. Prior to starting his Ph.D., Jvala underwent training through traditional scholarly lineages of mentor-protégé in India. He completed his Ph.D. at the University of British Columbia. The focus of his research was examining pre-colonial Sikh narratives in Braj and Punjabi literature from the 18th and 19th centuries. He worked on a dissertation regarding Kavi Santokh Singh's Suraj Prakash. He has researched Vir Singh's publication of the Suraj Prakash. He is a lecturer of the Punjabi-language at the University of California, Berkeley. He is also a lawyer.

He is the author of 54 Punjabi Proverbs, a book covering classic and elusive Punjabi proverbs by rendering them in English.

On 17 June 2024, he presented a lecture titled The All-Metal Text (Sarbloh Granth), A Sikh Retelling of a Jain Text? on the Sarbloh Granth at the CSASA-ACESA's Congress 2024 Meeting.

Jvala Singh completed his PhD at the Department of Asian Studies of the University of British Columbia under the supervision of Anne Murphy with the following doctoral thesis titled The splendor of several suns : the Gurpratāp Sūraj Granth and the Sikh intellectual tradition in the early 19th century. He has conducted research on the Sikh relationship with Advaita Vedanta, leading to a Sikh form of it that he terms Sikh Advaita. In April 2026, Jvala Singh digitized the Japanese translation of Japji Sahib by Tomio Mizokami.

== Projects ==
=== Manglacharan ===
Jvala Singh runs Manglacharan.com, which is an open-access website that hosts many first-ever English translations of specific Sikh literature. It is an attempt to decolonize the access to Sikh philosophy and to reclaim Sikh works from colonial constructs.

=== Suraj Podcast ===
Jvala Singh is the creator of the Suraj Podcast, sourcing his content for the podcast from the Suraj Prakash. Each episode of the Suraj Podcast is a summary in English of a chapter from the Suraj Prakash, covering the life-stories of the Sikh gurus and their associates. Each episode of the Suraj Podcast is around 10–15 minutes long. All the stories covering Guru Hargobind in-particular from the Suraj Prakash have been retold by Jvala Singh in the original Suraj Prakash podcast.

The Suraj Podcast allows for Sikhs who are not well-versed in Braj or Sanskrit, to become familiar with the traditional tales found within the Suraj Prakash, allowing for Sikh reclamation of the text. The Suraj Podcast is an example of Sikhs utilizing the Internet, and social-media in-particular, to narrate Sakhis to a larger and more international audience than traditional spaces allow for. Jvala presents the Suraj Prakash in the podcast as unfiltered, authentic history.

Suraj Podcast X ("Suraj Podcast Dasvi") has since been launched as a sequel to the original podcast, covering the life-stories related to Guru Gobind Singh found in the Suraj Prakash.

=== Study Sikhi ===
In January 2025, Study Sikhi, an online Sikh educational institution with enrollable courses set-up by Jvala Singh, was launched.

The following courses were made available:

- SS 101 - Intro to the Sikh Tradition
- SS 102 - The Making of Modern Sikhism
- SS 201 - Intro to Japu Ji Sahib
- SS 301 - Dasam Granth & The Goddess

== Bibliography ==
- Singh, Jvala (2019). Nihangnama (The Nihang Treatise) (PDF). Punjabi Library.
- Singh, Jvala (August 2019). 54 Punjabi Proverbs: A Book of Punjabi Wisdom Passed Down Through the Generations. Tattva. ISBN 9781999862497.
- Sembi, Jvala Singh (2024). The splendor of several suns : the Gurpratāp Sūraj Granth and the Sikh intellectual tradition in the early 19th century. Department of Asian Studies, Faculty of Arts, University of British Columbia. DOI 10.14288/1.0443950.
- Singh, Jvala; Singh, Itvinder (2026). The Ballad of Chandi: Poems of Resistance and Victory.
- Singh, Jvala. "A Sikh Advaita Vedānta." Modern Asian Studies (2026): 1-28. Department of South and Southeast Asian Studies, University of California, Berkeley, Cambridge University Press, DOI:10.1017/S0026749X25101674.

== See also ==
- Sikh Studies
