= Tara Singh Narotam =

Nirmala scholar (1822–1891)

Pandit Tara Singh Narotam
- ਪੰਡਿਤ ਤਾਰਾ ਸਿੰਘ ਨਰੋਤਮ
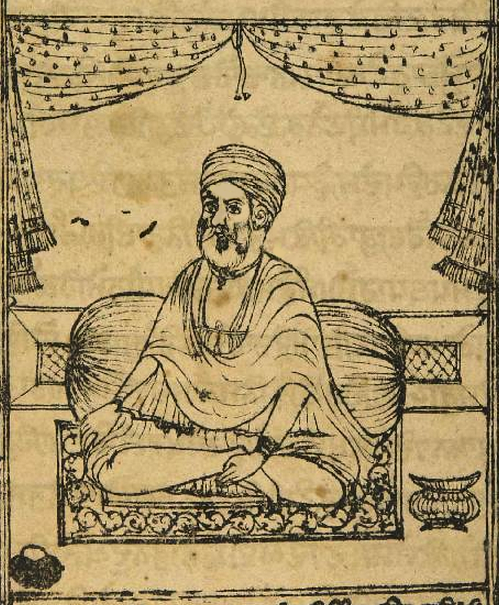
- Pandit Tara Singh was the most well-known Nirmala sadhu.
- Born: 1822; Kahlwan, Gurdaspur, Punjab, Sikh Empire
- Died: 1891 (aged 68–69); Patiala, Patiala State
- Writing career
- Language: Punjabi, Sanskrit
- Notable works: Gurmat Nirnay Sagar; Sri Gur Tirath Sangrah; Guru Girarath Kosh

Pandit Tara Singh Narotam (1822–1891) or also Pundit Tara Singh Nawtam, was a famous Punjabi scholar who belonged to the Sikh Nirmala Sect. Tara Singh, who was proficient in both Punjabi and Sanskrit, authored at-least ten works on Sikh theology, shrines, and scriptures, with the most notable being the Gurmat Nirnay Sagar, the Sri Gur Tirath Sangrah, and Gur Girarath Kos. The title Narotam means "man par excellence". He served as the Sri Mahant (leader) of the Nirmal Panchayati Akhara in Haridwar. A notable disciple of his was Giani Gian Singh.

== Biography ==
Little is known about his early life. Pundit Tara Singh was born into a Sikh family at Kalma village in Gurdaspur district (near Qadian) to a devout Sikh father, his family were originally Brahmins. From a young age, Tara Singh attended diwans (Sikh religious gatherings). At the age of around twenty, he left his village Kahlwan, which was near Qadian, and he arrived at the Nirmala dera of Sant Gulab Singh at Kurala, Hoshiarpur district, who initiated him into the Nirmala sect. He received an education on Sikh texts at the dera. After, Tara Singh continued his studies at Amritsar. Tara Singh knew both Punjabi and Sanskrit, studying Vedic and Sanskrit literature at Kashi (Varanasi). He also studed in Bengal, specifically in the area of Nadia village in Santipur. In 1861, he attended the Arddha Kumbha festival at Haridwar. After his education, Tara Singh visited various centres of the Nirmalas across the Indian subcontinent.

By the early 1860s, he was a renowned scholar and had accumulated some fame throughout the region. The Maharaja of Patiala, Maharaja Narinder Singh (1824–1862) gave patronage to him, after which Tara Singh came to Patiala and established his own Nirmala dera by the name of Dharam Dhuja and began doing scholarly work. Pundit Tara Singh taught a large group of scholars which include the famous Sikh historian Giani Gian Singh (1822–1921) and Bishan Singh Muralewale of the Damdami Taksal. In 1875, Tara Singh became the head (Sri Mahant) of the main organization of the Nirmalas, the Nirmal Panchayati Akhara at Kankhal, Haridwar after the death of Mahant Ram Singh Kuberia.

In 1878, his Gurmat Nirnay Sagar work was published, which advocates the Sanatan Sikh interpretation based upon gurbani. The Sri Gur Tirath Sangrah following in 1883 provides information on 508 Sikh shrines. In 1889, the Gur Girarath Kos was published, which was a lexicon and dictionary of the Guru Granth Sahib, providing the etymology, meaning, and usage of various vocabulary found in Sikh scriptures, including from various languages of origin.

Tara Singh died at Patiala in 1891. Then ruler of Patiala, Maharaja Rajinder Singh, carried-out a state-funeral for Tara Singh.

=== Finding Hemkunt ===
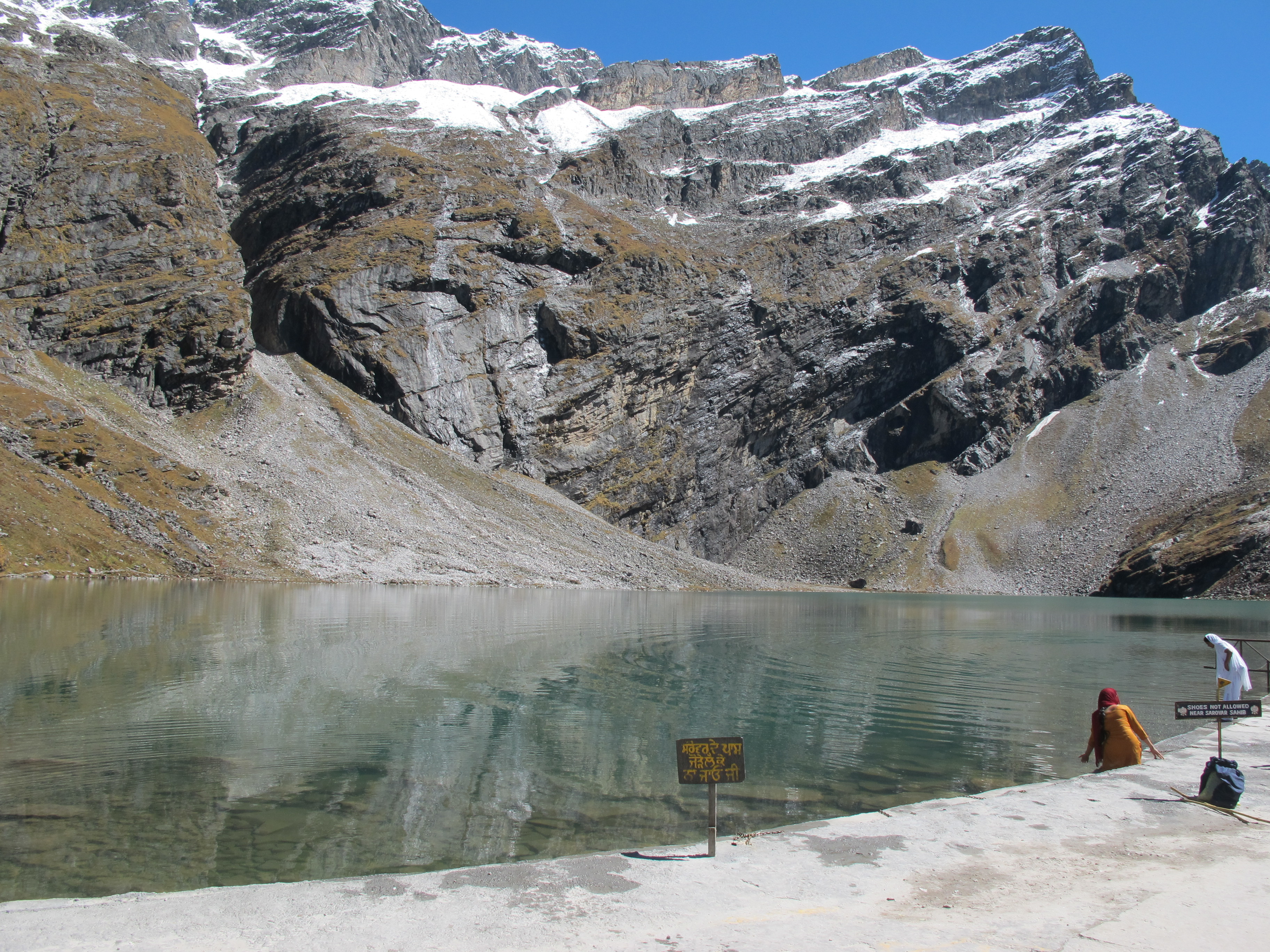
Hemkunt Lake

Pundit Tara Singh was the first Sikh to trace the geographical location of Hemkunt Sahib. Using clues from the Bachitar Natak to reveal Guru Gobind Singh's tap asthan (place of meditation) such as the place was named Sapatsring (seven peaks) and was on/near Hemkunt Parbat (lake of ice mountain), he set out to explore the Garhwal Himalayas and his search took him to Badrinath and to the nearby village of Pandukeshwar, near the present-day Gobind Ghat.

== Gurbani interpretation ==
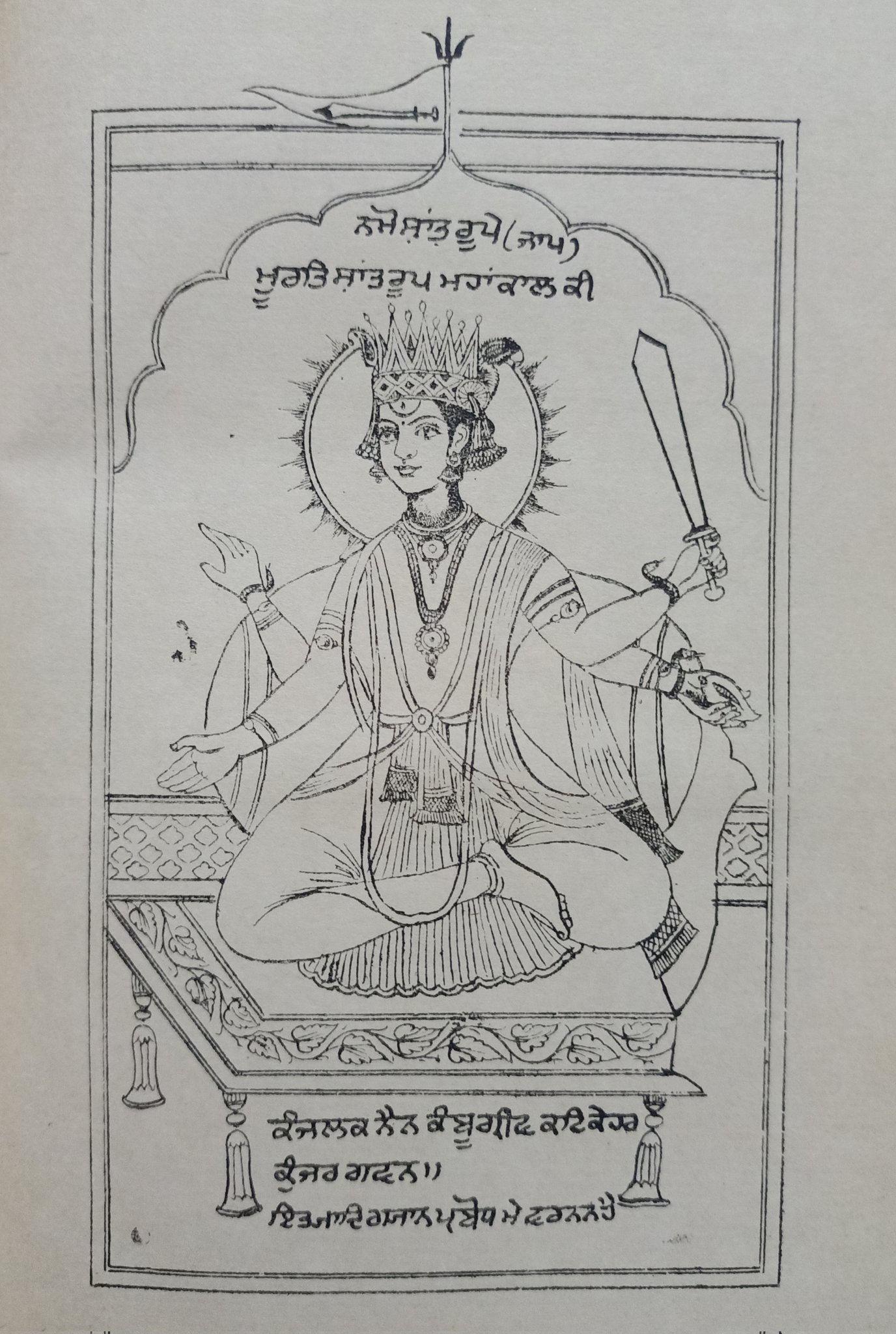
Iconographic depiction of the peaceful form ("Shaant Swaroop") of the God of the Dasam Granth. Symbolic depiction rather than literal. Published in 'Gurmat Nirnai Sagar' by Pandit Tara Singh Narotam.

Pandit Tara Singh conforms to the Nirmala school of thought. He presents Sikhism from a Vedantic orientation, and it being a blend of Sankara and Ramanuja. Tara Singh believed that in gurmat, bhakti (devotion) took precedence over jnana (knowledge) and karma (action), with bhakti being based entirely on jnana. He taught that mukti was a bodiless state of being. Tara Singh believed that Guru Nanak was an incarnation of Vishnu (Mahavishnu as opposed to the deva) and that Guru Nanak believed in the Vedas, affirming them except in idolatry. He believed that the Guru Granth Sahib and its gurbani was a revelation akin to the Vedic literature. He wrote extensively about the meaning of Waheguru in his book Waheguru Shabad-Arth Tika. Tara Singh believed that Waheguru referred to Vishnu rather than the Nirgun aspect of divinity.

In the Mahan Kosh, it is written that Pandit Tara Singh believes that the Sarbloh Granth was produced by Bhai Sukha Singh, the head Granthi of Patna Sahib from a manuscript given by an Udasi from Shri Jagannathpuri (Odisha) who said it was Guru Gobind Singh's writing. Pandit Tara Singh also believed that the entire Dasam Granth was written by Guru Gobind Singh.

== Published works ==
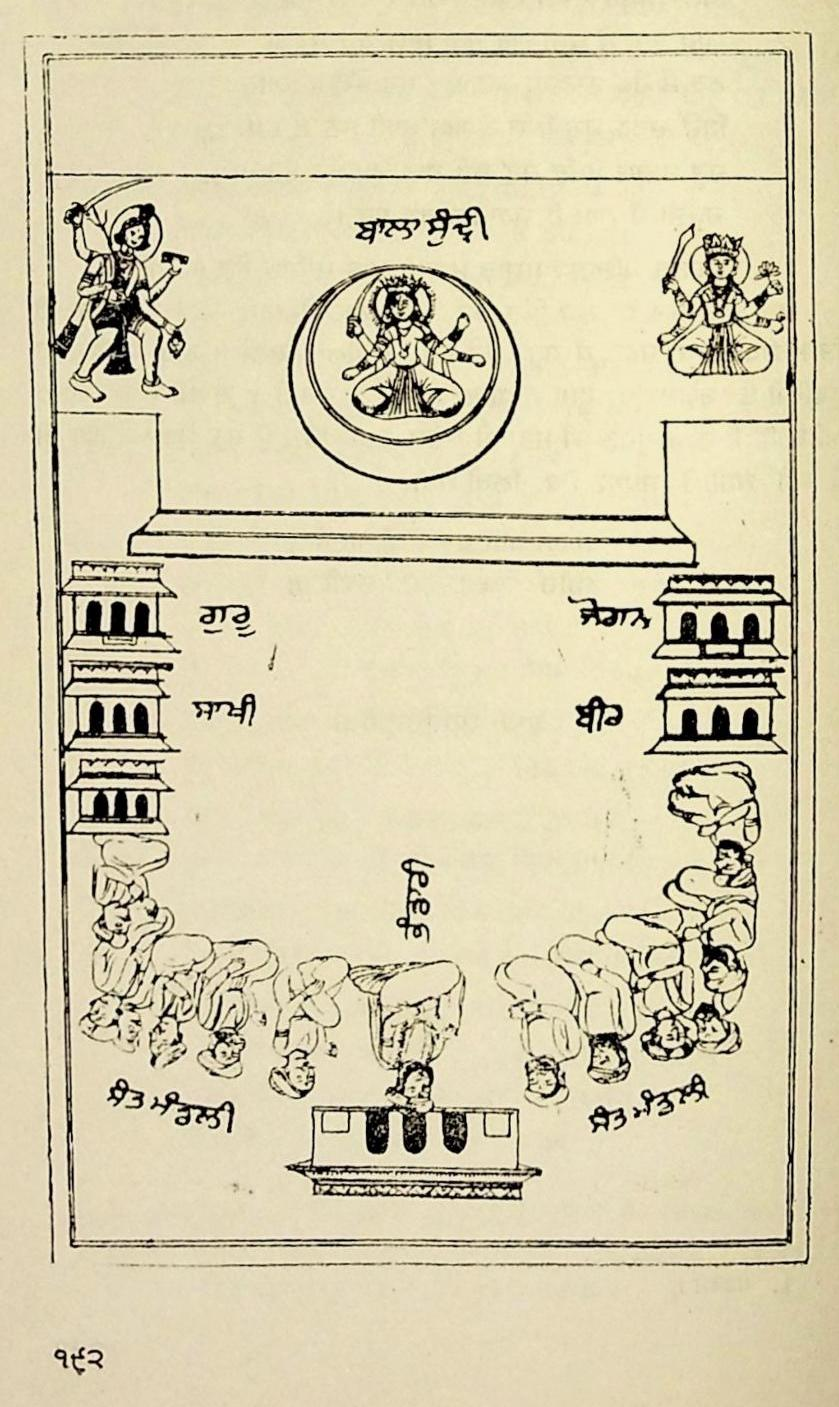
Esoteric Shaktist and Devi illustration published in Tara Singh Narotam's 'Gurmat Nirnai Sagar'

Tara Singh wrote exegetical, lexicographical, theological, and doctrinal works, with him showing Vedantic influence in his works on Sikhism. He was also influenced by the Sanskritic works of the Vedic, Shastric, and Puranic literature. He may have written a commentary on the entire Guru Granth Sahib but it is assumed to be lost. His more famous works are Gurmat Nirnay Sagar, Sri Gur Tirath Sangrah, and Guru Girarath Kos. Other notable works include a commentary on Bani of the Bhagats included in the Guru Granth Sahib.

- Vahiguru Sabdarth (1862)
- Tika Bhagat Bani Ka (1872)
- Tika Guru Bhav Dipika (1879)
- Sri Guru Tirath Sangrahi (1883)
- Granth Sri Gurmat Nirnaya Sagar (1877 or 1878)
- Sabda Sur Kosh (1866)
- Akal Murati Pradarsan (1878)
- Guru Vans Taru Darpan (1878)
- Granth Guru Girarth Kosh (1889)
- Prikhia Prakaran (1890)
- Tika Sri Raga (1885)
- Updesh Shatak Basha
- Sehrafi Raje Bharthari
- Japji Sahib Steek

== See also ==
- Ratan Singh Bhangu
- Kavi Santokh Singh
- Giani Gian Singh
