= Granthi =

Person who reads the Guru Granth Sahib to worshipers

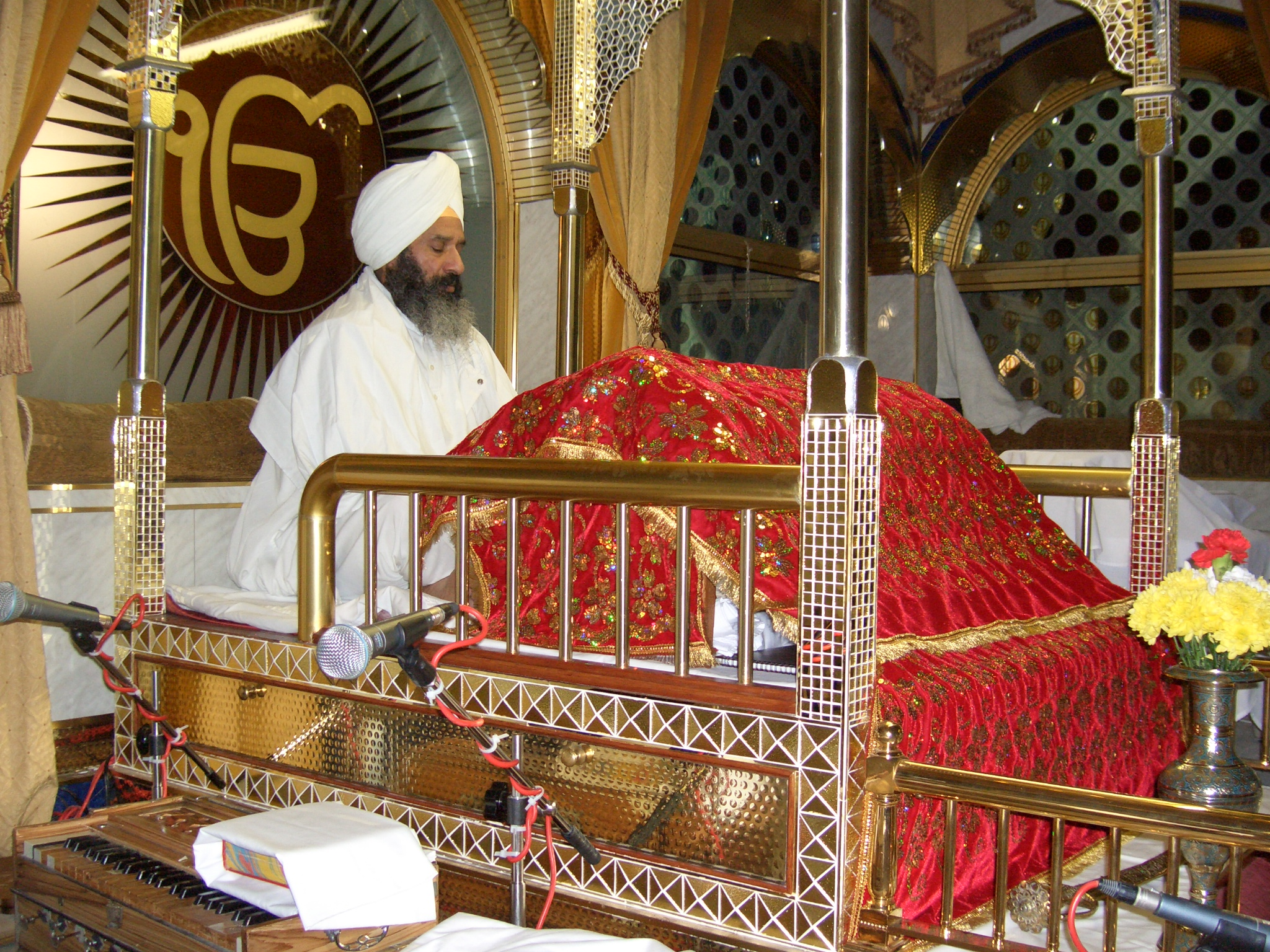
A Granthi reading from the Guru Granth Sahib

A Granthi (Punjabi: ਗ੍ਰੰਥੀ, IPA: [ˈɡɾən.t̪ʰiː]) is a person, female or male, of the Sikh religion who is a ceremonial reader of the Guru Granth Sahib, which is the holy book in Sikhism, often read to worshipers at Sikh temples called a Gurdwara.

The name Granthi comes from the Sanskrit granthika, which means a relater or narrator. Any Sikh individual appointed the title of being a Granthi is considered a principal religious official of Sikhism. Although they are considered religious officials in Sikhism, they are not considered to be the equivalent of a priest, as the belief is that there are no such religious intermediaries.

== History ==
According to Sikh lore, the first Granthi was Baba Buddha, whom had been appointed by Guru Arjan to recite the then newly-compiled Adi Granth when it was first installed in the Harmandir shrine. Kavi Santokh Singh, in Suraj Prakash, describes this moment:

Arrived at Hari Mandir, ragis were singing in rags’s high notes.

Placed Grinth [Braj form of 'Granth'] with manji, then Guru own-self sat nearby.31

Listened to [Asa-ki-]Var with focused mind, then at end revered Arjan spoke.

“Buddha, open Sahib Grinth, make [Sabad] resound, [let] the whole Panth listen.”32

After listening to [Guru’s] ask liked by mind, [Buddha’s] mouth spoke statement is true.

Then, with respect, Grinth was opened, Buddha’s mouth voiced the [Sabad] resound.33

— Kavi Santokh Singh, Sri Gur Pratap Suraj Granth (Ras 3, Adhiai 50)

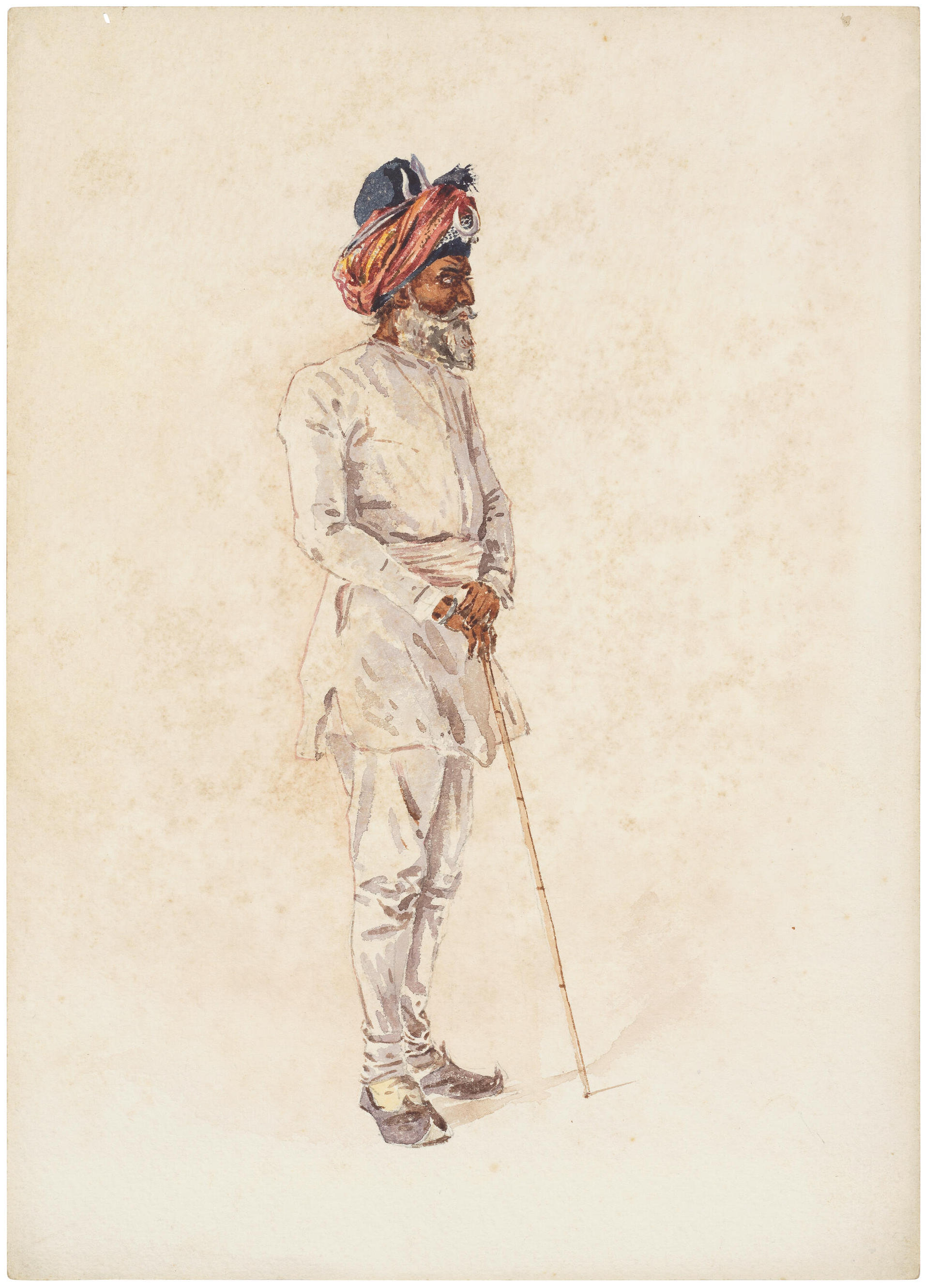
Painting of a regimental granthi, by Alfred Crowdy Lovett, ca.1890–1900

Granthis were part of the Sikh Army of the Sikh Empire. Later, during the British colonial-period, several Sikh regiments were assigned a regimental granthi, beginning with the Regiment of Ferozepur, also called the 14th Sikhs, in 1847. Their duty was to conduct religious ceremonies for the troops they were permanently stationed with.

== Qualifications ==
To be appointed a Granthi, one of the main qualifications is the commitment to the Sikh religion by becoming an Amritdhari Sikh. This is an acceptance of the full physical and spiritual discipline outlined in the Sikh Reht Maryada through a religious ceremony performed at the Gurdwara called an Amrit Sanchar.

This ceremony is approved and conducted by the Panj Pyare. The five who are selected to perform this ceremony are chosen by the holy congregation referred to as the Sarbat Khalsa.

Other important qualifications include being able to read the holy scriptures of the Guru Granth Sahib, which is the duty of a Paathi in the Gurdwara. A Granthi must be able to interpret the sacred hymns written in the Guru Granth Sahib, referred to as Gurbani, and must be able to fluently deliver sermons to the Sangat at the Gurdwara. Another important qualification is the ability to complete all duties related to taking care of the Guru Granth Sahib at ceremonies as it is referred to as the "living Guru" in a Gurdwara and by Sikhs worldwide.

A Granthi has to spend a few years as an assistant to a qualified reputable Granthi, who will act as a mentor and pass on his or her knowledge to teach ceremonial aspects of his or her duties. Assistant Granthis must possess the skills to play tabla, which is a pair of percussion drums use in classical Indian music.

This is a necessity as they are required to join the head Granthi during Gurmat Kirtan, which is the rendering of verses from the Guru Granth Sahib in the Ragas in the Guru Granth Sahib, Taalas, and musical scores composed in the scripture, considered the most important aspect of a prayer gathering.

It is expected that an assistant Granthi looking to become a qualified Granthi be mentored for a minimum of three years so that they learn all aspects of the ceremonial procedures and that they build up their ability to become a head Granthi at a Gurdwara who can recite prayers to a medium- to large-size Sangat.

== Gallery ==
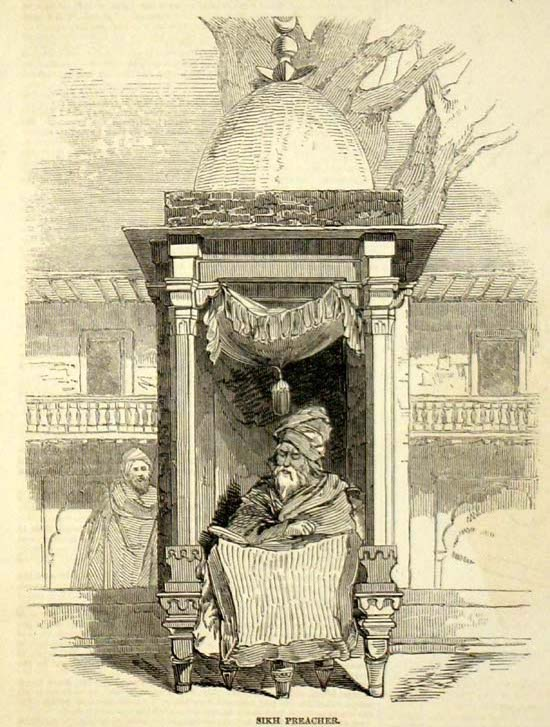
Sikh preacher (Granthi), ca.1845., by Godfrey Vigne

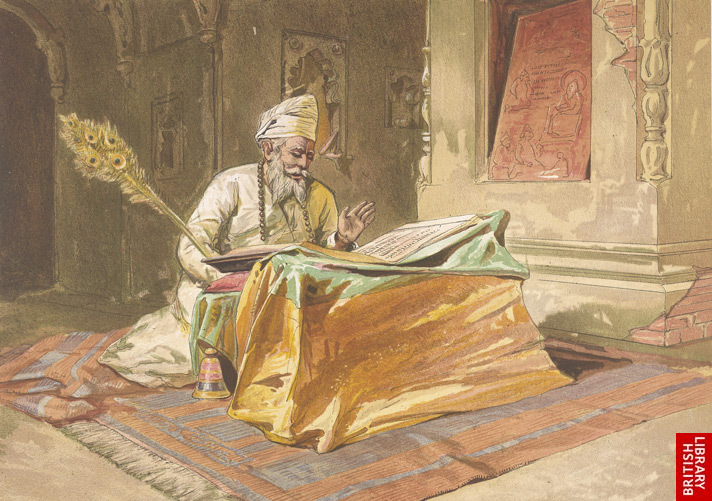
"Sikh priest [Granthi] reading the Grunth [Guru Granth Sahib], Umritsur [Amritsar]", by William Simpson, circa 1867
