= Khalsa Samachar =

Weekly Sikh newspaper

- Weekly paper of the Sikhs
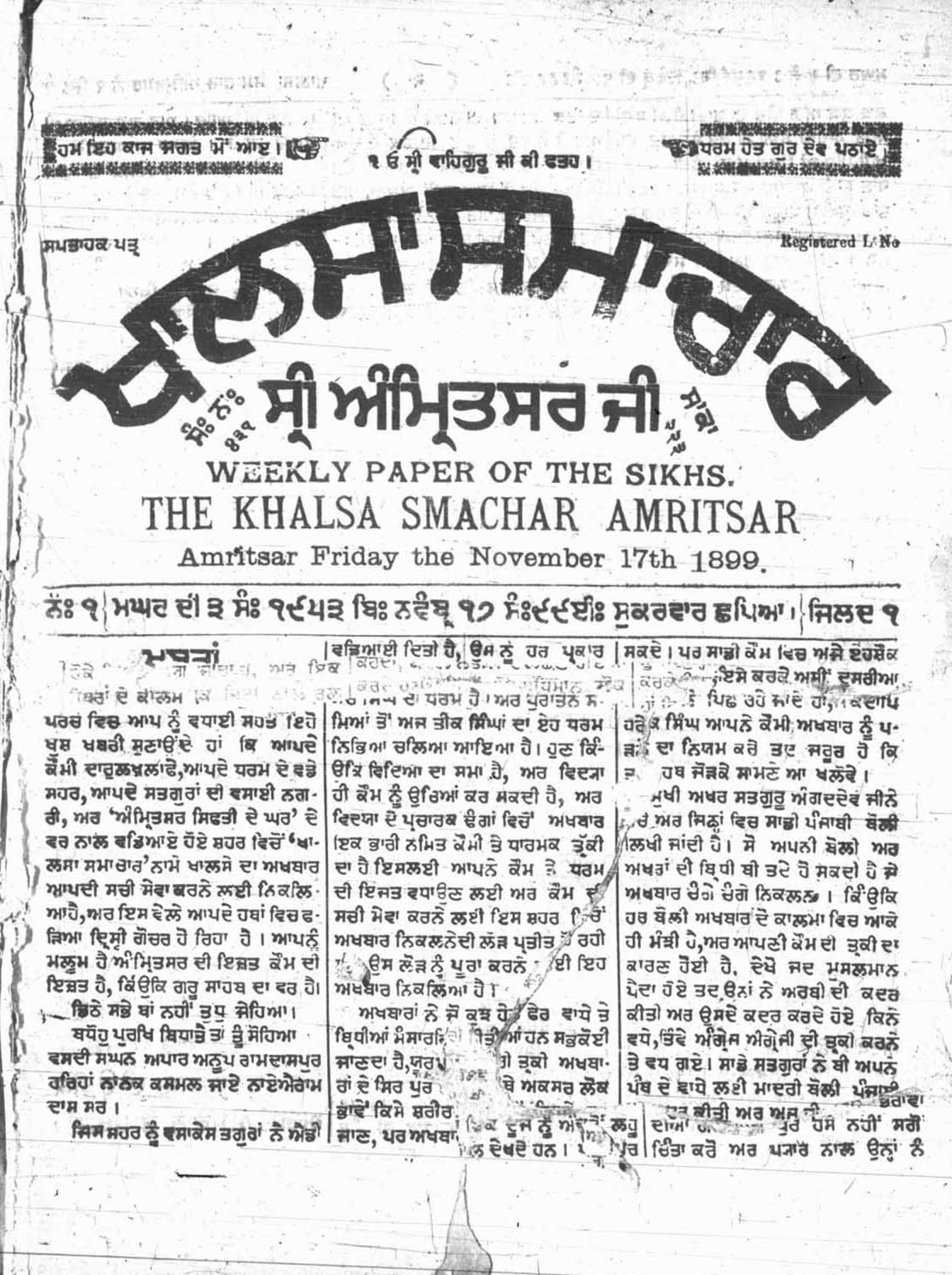
- Front page of the first issue of the Khalsa Samchar, 17 November 1899
- Type: Weekly newspaper
- Founder: Vir Singh
- Publisher: Bhai Vir Singh Sahitya Sadan
- Founded: 17 November 1899
- City: Amritsar (original); Delhi (present)

Khalsa Samachar is a Sikh weekly newspaper that was founded in 1899 by Vir Singh. (Note: The name of the newspaper was originally transliterated as 'Khalsa Smachar'. It is alternatively spelt as 'Khalsa Samchar'.) The periodical covers Panthic news, the tenets of the Sikh religion, elucidation of gurbani, and imparting the teachings of Sikhism. It was one of the early Punjabi and Gurmukhi newspapers that left a lasting influence and one of the most influential Sikh newspapers prior to 1920.

== History ==
=== Background ===
In 1892, Vir Singh and Wazir Singh established the Wazir-i-Hind Press in Amritsar. Wazir Singh was a distant maternal relative of Vir Singh. Vir Singh's grandfather, Giani Hazara Singh, provided funds to assist with the establishment of the press. In 1893, Vir Singh helped found the Khalsa Tract Society alongside Kaur Singh (who was the son of Sadhu Singh Dhupia). The majority of the tracts published by the society were authored by Vir Singh. Alongside religious topics, with society also published works on other subjects, such as social evils that had sprung up within the wider Sikh community. After establishing a press and tract society, the final step left in Vir Singh's efforts to revitalize Sikhism was the establishment of a newspaper.

=== Establishment and work ===
Motivated by his earlier work with the Khalsa Tract Society, the Khalsa Samachar newspaper was founded by Vir Singh in 1899 and its first issue was published on 17 November 1899, which coincided with the celebration of Guru Nanak's birthday. The newspaper states in its first issue that it was founded in Amritsar because the city carries great religious significance in Sikhism. The first issue further elaborates on the importance of print media in reaching the Sikh masses (Qaum, meaning "community") and as a tool for imparting the tenets and ideals of the Sikh religion upon them. The newspaper also stated that it sought to emulate the success that newspapers had in Europe. Vir Singh suffered a financial loss from setting-up the newspaper and its publication but it eventually was a success. The development of the Punjabi language, written in Gurmukhi script, was assisted by the publication of the Khalsa Samachar. For the first fourteen or fifteen years, the paper was edited by Vir Singh. The newspaper was an advocate of pan-Punjab Sikh activism. The influence of its published editorials and daily news articles led to the spread of Sikh programmes on a singular, regular foundation.

Originally, the newspaper was published on every Monday until 1902, when it began to be published on Wednesday and Thursday as well. For a given year, all of the issues for that year were published together in one volume, known as a jilad. The jilad consisted of the individual issues, which were called anks. There were four anks per month, which meant a jilad (annual volume) contained 48–49 anks (issues) per year.

In 1914, Sewa Singh joined Vir Singh in publishing the newspaper. Vir Singh passed on the editorship to Sewa Singh but he remained involved with the newspaper. Sewa Singh died in 1944. In July 1973, S. S. Amol took on the responsibility for the newspaper for three years, he was succeeded by Manjit Singh. The current editors of the paper are Jaswant Singh Neki and Mohinder Singh.

The newspaper was originally published out of Amritsar but its publication location shifted to Delhi in December 1990. It is currently published by the Bhai Vir Singh Sahitya Sadan. The newspaper has survived up until the present and is still published.

== Digitization ==
Many old issues of the newspaper have been digitized. Digitized issues from 1917, 1919–1920 are available at the CRL (Center for Research Libraries) Digital Delivery System. The Bhai Vir Singh Sahitya Sadan has digitized historical issues from the years 1899–1904 and 1917 available for viewing and modern issues from 2020–2021.
