= Mahan Kosh =

Sikh encyclopaedia (1930)

- Cover folio of the 1930 first edition
- Author: Kahn Singh Nabha
- Publication date: 13 April 1930

Guru Shabad Ratnakar Mahan Kosh (Punjabi: ਗੁਰਸ਼ਬਦ ਰਤਨਾਕਰ ਮਹਾਨ ਕੋਸ਼), known by its more popular name of Mahan Kosh (ਮਹਾਨ ਕੋਸ਼) and by the English title Encyclopædia of the Sikh Literature, is a Punjabi language encyclopedia and dictionary which was compiled by Bhai Kahn Singh Nabha over fourteen years, published in 1930. It was the first Punjabi encyclopedia, it contains around 65,000 words, some of them has sufficient reference from Guru Granth Sahib, Dasam Granth, Gur Pratap Suraj Granth and from other Sikh books. It is considered a groundbreaking work in terms of its impact and its level of scholarship, being perhaps the most comprehensive dictionary-encyclopedia on Sikhism.

== Dictionary ==
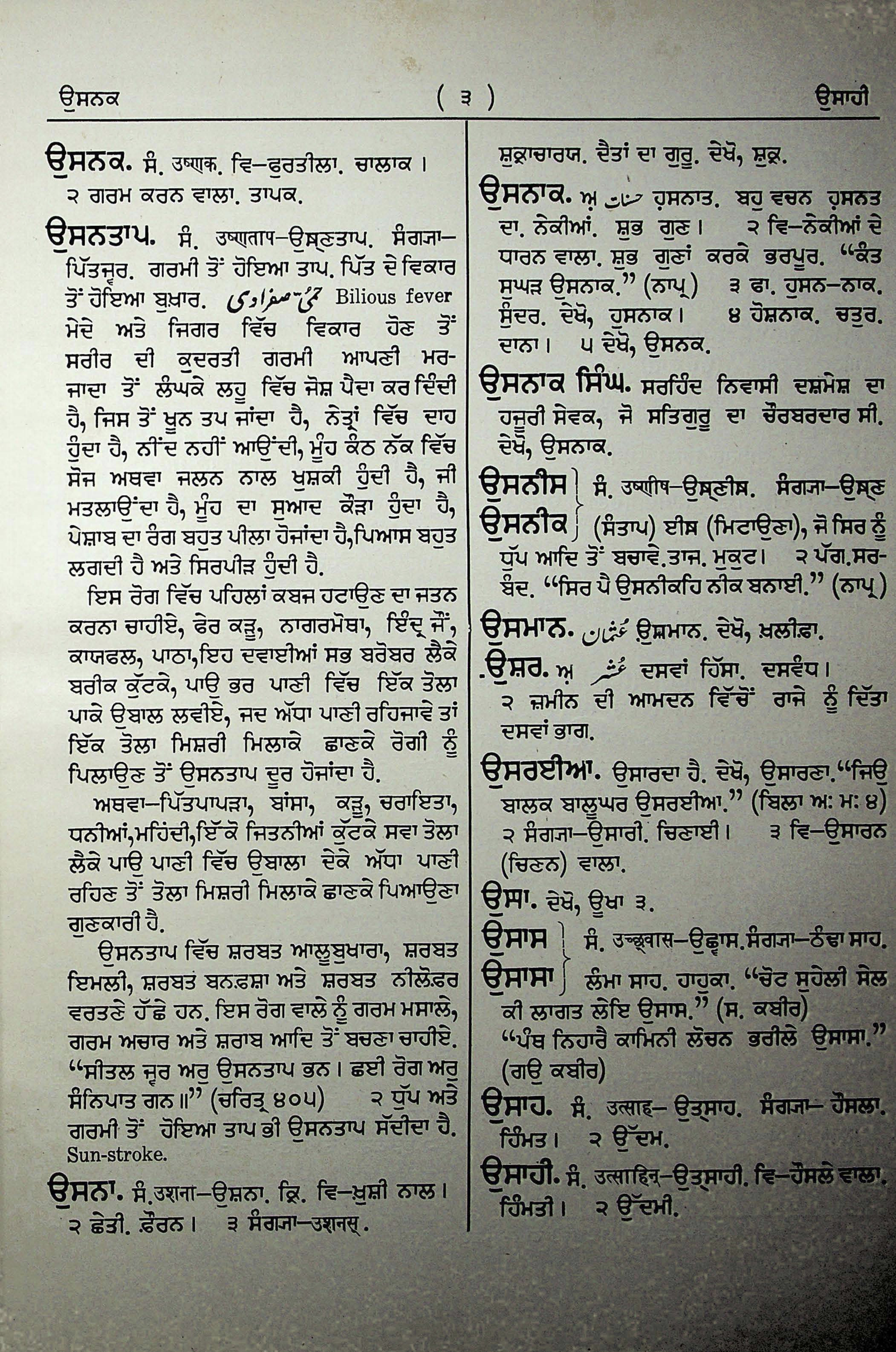
Example of a page showing definitions from the Mahan Kosh by Kahn Singh of Nabha (1930; first ed.; vol. I; p. 3)

Mahan Kosh has 64,263 entries arranged in the alphabetical order of the Gurmukhi script covering religious and historical terms in the Sikh canon. Each entry records the etymology and different meanings of a term "according to its usage at different places in different works" alongside textual quotations. When words of Perso-Arabic or Sanskrit origin appear they are reproduced in their original scripts to inform readers of their correct pronunciation and connotation. Fields covered include philosophy, history, geography, science, and linguistics. References to non-Sikh works are also made when relevant.

== Illustrations ==
The original publication featured 81 illustrations in-total, comprising of 58 photographs/images while 17 are maps. Notably, there are no illustrations depicting the Sikh gurus or other figures. According to W. H. McLeod, this was due to Nabha and other Singh Sabhaist reformers having generally a disapproving view of pictorial representations of historical Sikh figures.

== Publication ==
While studying two existing titles, Pandit Tara Singh Narotam's Granth Guru Girarth Kos (1895) and Hazara Singh's Sri Guru Granth Kos (1899), Kahn Singh realised there would be great value in a lexicography on words occurring in Sikh historical texts as well as in the Guru Granth Sahib because it would promote literacy and critical studies in Punjabi.

On 12 May 1912 he resigned his position in Nabha State and began work on the project. His original patron, Maharaja Brijindar Singh of Faridkot State, who had earlier sponsored scholarly work on the Guru Granth Sahib died in 1918. His other patron, Maharaja Ripudaman Singh was forced to abdicate his throne in 1923. Maharaja Bhupinder Singh of Patiala State then offered to underwrite the entire expense of printing. Kahn Singh finished the work on 6 February 1926 and printing began on 26 October 1927 at the Sudarshan Press in Amritsar, owned by the poet Dhani Ram Chatrik. The first printing, in four volumes, was finished on 13 April 1930. The Languages Department of Punjab, Patiala then published Mahan Kosh in one volume and it has gone through three editions, the fourth released in 1981.

The Punjabi University in Patiala has translated it into English.

== See also ==
- Panth Parkash
- Suraj Prakash
- Twarikh Guru Khalsa
- Encyclopaedia of Indian Literature
- Makers of Indian Literature
