= Kahlwan =

- Village
- Location in Punjab, India Kahlwan (India)
- Coordinates: 31.425855°N 75.519663°E
- Country: India
- State: Punjab
- District: Jalandhar

Government
  - Type: Panchayati raj (India)
  - Body: Gram panchayat

Population (2011)
  - Total: 2,123
- Sex ratio 1071/1050♂/♀

Languages
  - Official: Punjabi
  - Other spoken: Punjabi
- Time zone: UTC+5:30 (IST)
- PIN: 144625
- Telephone code: 01822
- ISO 3166 code: IN-PB
- Vehicle registration: PB-08
- Website: kapurthala.gov.in

Kahlwan is a village in Jalandhar district of Punjab State, India. It is located 22 kilometres (14 mi) from Jalandhar, which is both district and sub-district headquarters of Kahlwan. The village is administrated by a Sarpanch who is an elected representative of village as per the constitution of India and Panchayati raj (India). Khalwan is famous for being the birthplace and area of activity of notorious gangster Sukha Khalwan.This village is also linked with Sardar Lehna Singh Kahlon of the Bhangi Misl, who ruled Lahore between 1765 and 1797 and his son Chet who ruled for 2 years before losing Lahore to Maharaja Ranjit Singh - the Kahlons in this village are from his Tubbar (clan) as the Jathera of people in Kahlwan is Village Saidowal near Gurdaspur which is where Lehna's grandfather came from with the mother village in Kartarpur being Mustfapur which is where the grandfather settled - see Sir Leppel Griffin's Panjab Chiefs under Bhangi Sardars.

== Demography ==
According to the report published by Census India in 2011, Kahlwan has 162 houses with the total population of 818 persons of which 438 are male and 380 females. Literacy rate of Kahlwan is 75.27%, lower than the state average of 75.84%. The population of children in the age group 0–6 years is 86 which is 10.51% of the total population. Child sex ratio is approximately 686, lower than the state average of 846.

== Population data ==
Particulars	Total	Male	Female
Total No. of Houses	162	-	-
Population	818	438	380
Child (0-6)	86	51	35
Schedule Caste	142	76	66
Schedule Tribe	0	0	0
Literacy	75.27 %	79.33 %	70.72 %
Total Workers	314	244	70
Main Worker	218	0	0
Marginal Worker	96	54	42
