= Khalsa Tract Society =

Sikh tract society

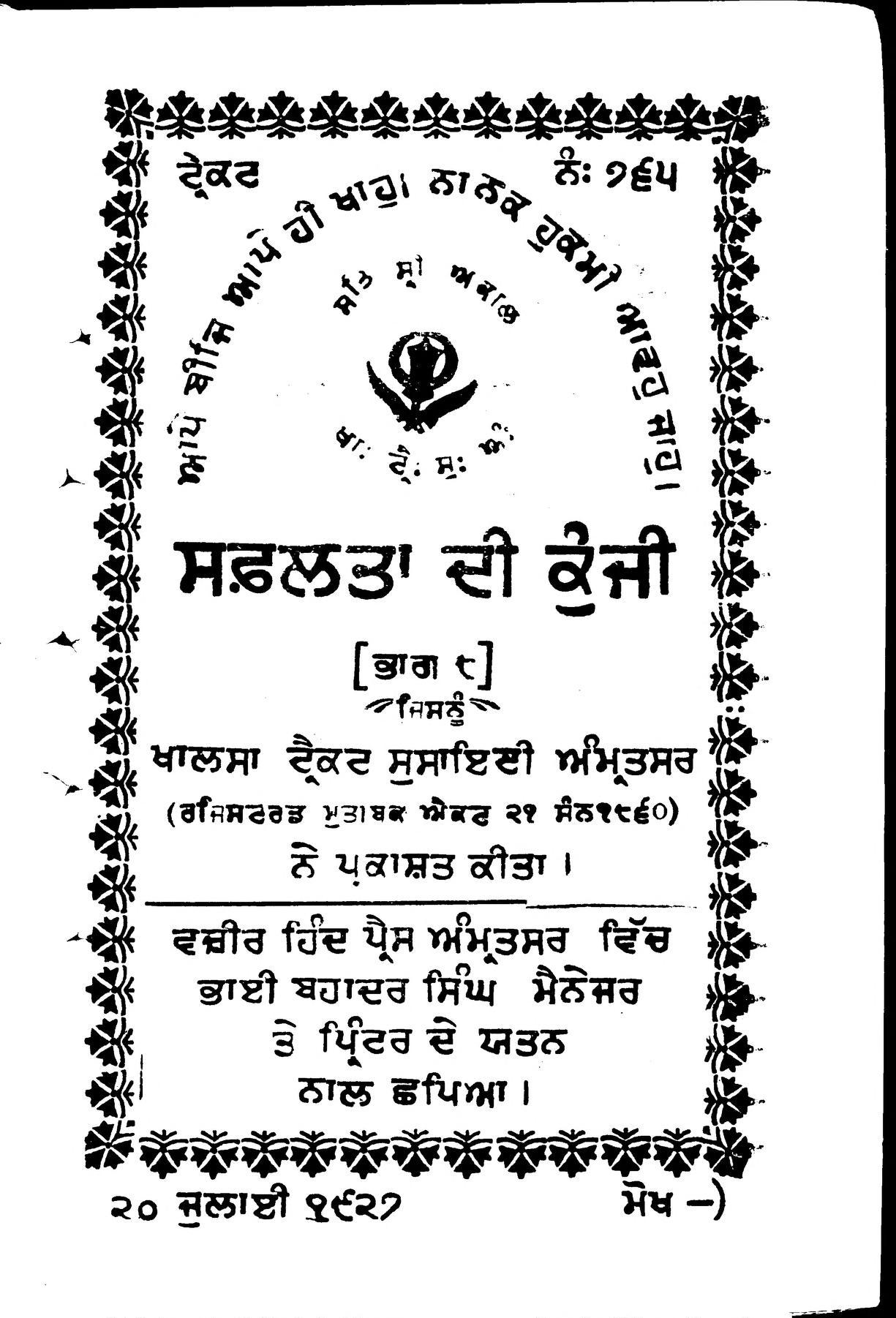
- Title-page of 'Saflata Di Kunji - 8' ("The Key to Success") by the Khalsa Tract Society (20 July 1927)
- Formation: 1893
- Founder: Vir Singh; Kaur Singh
- Purpose: Sikh religious organization

The Khalsa Tract Society was an organization created by Bhai Vir Singh and Kaur Singh in 1893 to promote the aims and objects of the Singh Sabha Movement. The organization had a large output of tracts over the years that touched upon various subjects.

== History ==
The genre of Punjabi tract literature arose in the late-19th century and played a vital role in Punjabi socio-religious reforms and engaging in refutation and criticism of religious rivals.

In 1893, Vir Singh helped found the Khalsa Tract Society alongside Kaur Singh (who was the son of Sadhu Singh Dhupia). (Note: N. G. Barrier gives the year 1894 as the founding year of the organization.) The majority of the tracts published by the society were authored by Vir Singh. The society published small, cheap volumes on religious and social subjects. Alongside religious topics, with society also published works on other subjects, such as social evils that had sprung up within the wider Sikh community. Keeping in-line with the ideals of the Khalsa Tract Society, Vir Singh would later found the Khalsa Samachar newspaper.

In 1902, the Khalsa Tract Society claimed in its report that up till then, it had published 200 works and distributed half a million copies of these works. By 1911, the organization had produced 400 tract works, with one million copies in-total.

In a discussion between Master Tara Singh and Lala Lajpat Rai, the former suggested to the latter that if he is a true patiot (desh bhagat), then he should study Sikhism in-detail, specifically the Punjabi works published by the Khalsa Tract Society.

It was not the only Sikh tract organization, there was also the Panch Khalsa Society, which by 1910 had printed 125 tracts.

== Legacy ==
Sikh organizations excelled at tract literature in Punjab during this era, with N. G. Barrier estimating that Sikh organizations had produced 1,200 tract works between the years 1880 and 1915. According to J. S. Grewal, the efforts of the Khalsa Tract Society helped modern Punjabi arise as a language of instruction.
