= Vir Singh (writer) =

Indian writer and poet

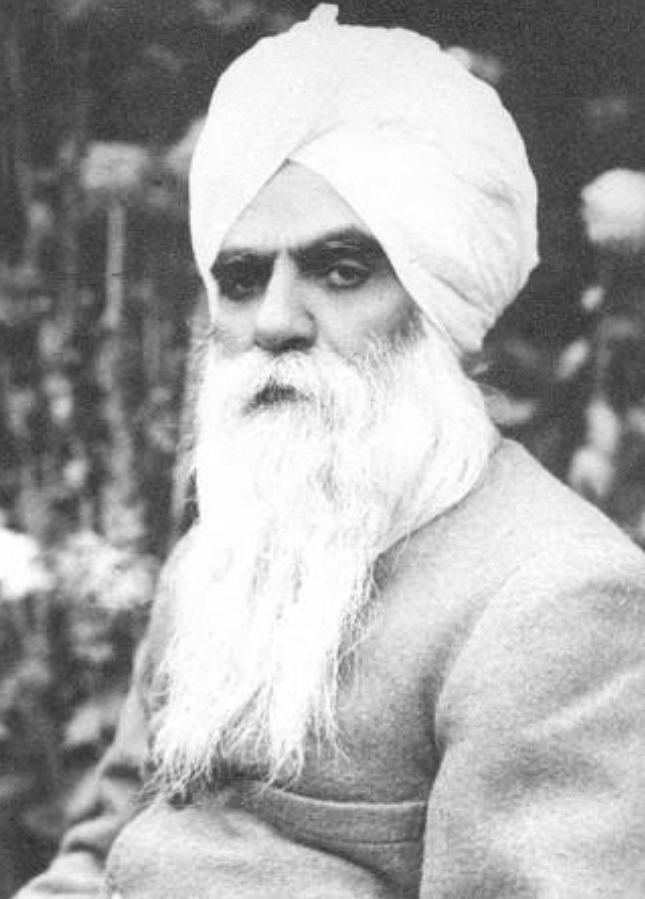
- Born: 5 December 1872; Amritsar, Punjab, British India
- Died: 10 June 1957 (aged 84); Amritsar, Punjab, India
- Education: Matriculation
- Alma mater: Amritsar Church Mission School Bazar Kaserian, Amritsar
- Occupations: Poet, short-story writer, song composer, novelist, playwright and essayist.
- Spouse: Mata Chatar Kaur
- Children: 2 daughters
- Writing career
- Language: Punjabi
- Period: 1891
- Notable works: Sundari (1898), Bijay Singh (1899), Satwant Kaur,"Rana Surat Singh" (1905)
- Notable awards: Sahitya Academy Award (1955); Padma Bhushan (1956)
- Movement: Shiromani Akali Dal
- Website: bvsss.org

Vir Singh (5 December 1872 – 10 June 1957) was a Sikh poet, scholar and theologist of the Sikh revival movement. He played a crucial role in the renewal of Punjabi literary tradition, was an important figure in the Singh Sabha movement and is considered the father of modern Punjabi literature.

Vir Singh developed the Punjabi historical fiction genre with his four novels Sundari (1898), Bijay Singh (1899), Satwant Kaur (1900), and Baba Naudh Singh (serialized from October 1917 to December 1921). The novel genre had been imported from Europe, and Vir Singh's work in the new genre helped promote the Sikh code of conduct in the background of the Singh Sabha movement, focusing on themes of Sikh sacrifice, martyrdom, symbolism, conversion, rites, resilience, and survival during the Mughal and British periods.

== Family and personal life ==
Singh with his father on the left, Charan Singh, and maternal grandfather, Giani Hazara Singh, on the right.

Born in 1872 in Amritsar, Singh was the eldest of Charan Singh's three sons. Vir Singh's family could trace its ancestry back to Diwan Kaura Mal, a vice-governor (Maharaja Bahadur) of the city of Multan. His grandfather, Kahn Singh (1788–1878), spent a great deal of his youth training and learning traditional Sikh lessons in monasteries. Fluent in Sanskrit and Braj, as well as in the oriental systems of medicine (such as Ayurveda, Siddha and Yunani), Kahn Singh influenced his only son, Charan Singh (1853-1908), who later fathered Vir Singh, to become an active member of the Sikh community, often producing poetry, music, and writings in hopes of restoring the Sikh culture. Vir Singh's maternal grandfather, Giani Hazara Singh (1828-1908), was a leading scholar of the Giāṇīā Bungā in Amritsar. A scholar of Persian and Sanskrit, Giani Hazara Singh translated into Punjabi the Persian classics such as Saadi's Gulistan and Bustan. At seventeen, Vir Singh married Chatar Kaur and they had two daughters. He died in Amritsar on 10 June 1957.

== Education ==
Singh had both a traditional indigenous and a modern English education. He learnt Sikh scripture as well as Persian, Urdu and Sanskrit. He joined the Church Mission School in Amritsar and took his matriculation examination in 1891, coming first in the entire district. Singh received his secondary education at Church Mission High School, and it was while attending this school that he found the conversion of some of his classmates from Sikhism to Christianity to fortify his own religious convictions toward Sikhism. Influenced by the Christian missionaries' use of and reference to literary sources, Singh began to teach others the main dogmas of Sikhism through his own written resources. Using the skills and techniques of modern literary forms, learned in his English courses, Singh produced stories, poems and epics, and recorded the history and philosophical ideas of Sikhism.

== Literary career ==
=== Beginnings ===
Singh chose to become a writer. After passing his matriculation examination, he worked with a friend of his father's, Wazir Singh, and set up a lithography press. His first commission was to write and print geography textbooks for schools.

In 1893 at age 18, Dhani Ram Chatrik found employment at Wazir Singh's press and met Vir Singh, who advised him to learn lithograph engraving and inspired him to write poetry in the Punjabi language. The Wazir Hind Press was the main press publishing literature for the Singh Sabha movement, and Vir Singh would purchase it after Wazir Singh passed away after illness. Thus he would begin a long association with Dhani Ram Chatrik, who had an 11-year career with the Press, and who subsequently wrote for the Khalsa Samachar, in which Chatrik would hone his poetic skills. Chatrik's contact with Vir Singh turned him into an ardent admirer of the Sikh faith, influencing his syncretic poetic style that reflected composite Punjabi culture.

=== Language politics ===
Singh argued that Sikhism was a unique religion which could be nourished and sustained by creating an awakening amongst the Sikhs of the awareness of their distinct theological and cultural identity. He aimed at reorienting the Sikhs' understanding of their faith in such a manner as to help them assimilate the different modernising influences to their historical memory and cultural heritage. At the time, Sikhs were persecuted by the British, often being pressured or threatened into assimilating into mainstream culture. Acts such as publicly shaving off the hair and beards of religious Sikh officials were performed to humiliate and demean them. Amidst this political discontent, Singh sought to revitalize Sikh culture and religion through peaceful means, by writing a myriad of novels, epics, and poems. With the fall of the Sikh Empire and the modernization of Christian, Muslim, and Hindu proselytism, the Sikh faith began to wane, until scholars and theologians began revitalizing Sikhism through their works of literature.

=== Works ===
Singh editing Suraj Prakash in Kashmir, 1928.

Singh began taking an interest in the affairs of the Singh sabha movement, and to promote its aims and objectives, he launched the Khalsa Tract Society in 1894. The tracts produced by the Khalsa Tract Society introduced a new style of literary Punjabi.

The Khalsa Tract Society periodically made available, under the title Nirguniara, low-cost publications on Sikh theology, history and philosophy and on social and religious reform. Through this journal, Singh established contact with an ever-expanding circle of readers. He used the Nirguniara as a vehicle for his own self-expression. Some of his major creative works such as Sri Guru Nanak Chamatkar and Sri Guru Kalgidhar Chamatkar were originally serialised in its columns.

In literature, Singh started as a writer of novels which are considered formative in the Punjabi novel genre. His writings – Sundari (1898), Bijay Singh (1899) and Satwant Kaur (published in two parts, I in 1900 and II in 1927), were aimed at recreating the heroic period (eighteenth century) of Sikh history. Through these novels, he made available to his readers models of courage, fortitude and human dignity. Singh championed the Sikh identity in a way that did not devalue other religions. He reprimanded the violation and destruction of Hindu idols in Kashmir in his book, Avantipur de Khandar. Singh criticized and discouraged religious fanaticism, describing those affected as victims of their own fears brought on by a fervent and obsessive belief.

The novel Subhagji da Sudhar Hathin Baba Naudh Singh, popularly known as Baba Naudh Singh (serialised in Nirguniara from 1907 onwards and published in book form in 1921), shares with the epic Rana Surat Singh (which he had started serialising in 1905) Vir Singh's interest in the theme of a widow's desperate urge for a reunion with her dead husband.

Soon after the publication of Rana Surat Singh in book form in 1919, he turned to shorter poems and lyrics. These included Dil Tarang (1920), Tarel Tupke (1921), Lahiran de Har (1921), Matak Hulare (1922), Bijlian de Har (1927) and Mere Sayian Jio (1953). Through these works, he paved the way for the emergence of the Punjabi poem.

In November 1899, he started a Punjabi weekly, the Khalsa Samachar. He revised and enlarged Giani Hazara Singh's dictionary, Sri Guru Granth Kosh, originally published in 1898. The revised version was published in 1927. He published critical editions of some of the old Sikh texts such as Sikhan di Bhagat Mala (1912), Prachin Panth Prakash (1914), Puratan Janam Sakhi (1926) and Sakhi Pothi (1950).

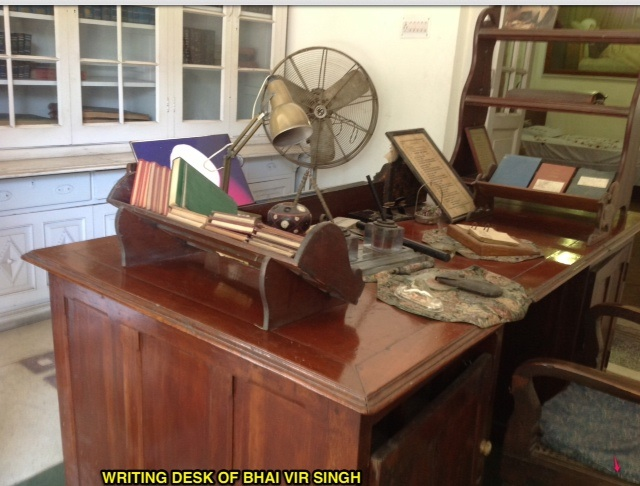
Singh's desk in his memorial house at Amritsar

An important work was Singh's annotation of Kavi Santokh Singh's Suraj Prakash, published from 1927 to 1935 in fourteen volumes. This publication of Suraj Prakash would be Vir Singh's most lengthy endeavor.

=== Role of women in his writings ===
Sikhism stresses equality between men and women and that it is sinful even to consider either sex above the other. Singh reflected this belief in his novels, and featured it in a number of strong female characters. His first novel was Sundari, which featured Sunder Kaur, a woman who converted from Hinduism to Sikhism and then proceeded to lead a life of adventure in the jungles with a band of Sikh warriors. This was the first novel penned in the Punjabi language. Through Sundari, Singh hoped to embody all the ideals of Guru Nanak’s lessons. The book was well received by the Sikh community and gained popularity almost immediately. Other important female characters were Rani Raj Kaur, Satvant Kaur, Subhagji and Sushil Kaur. Even by today's standards, these female characters are considered well rounded and an inspiration to male and female Sikhs alike. Singh often portrayed women in his novels as more prone to spiritual enlightenment than their male counterparts.

=== Punjab & Sind Bank ===
Singh was one of the founders of the Punjab & Sind Bank, co-founding it with Sir Sunder Singh Majitha, and Sardar Tarlochan Singh.

== Awards ==
He was honoured with the Sahitya Akademi Award in 1955 and the Padma Bhushan Award in 1956.

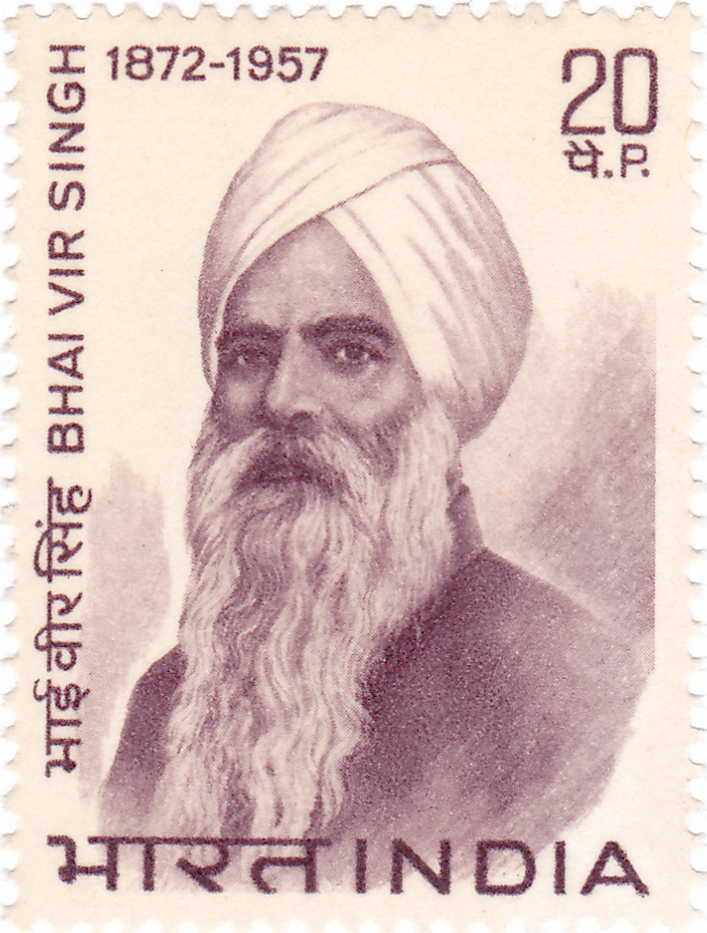
Indian stamp commemorating Vir Singh, 1972

1972 Indian stamp commemorating his birth centenary.

== Commentary ==
His commentary on nearly half of the Adi Granth was published posthumously in seven large volumes.

== Gallery ==
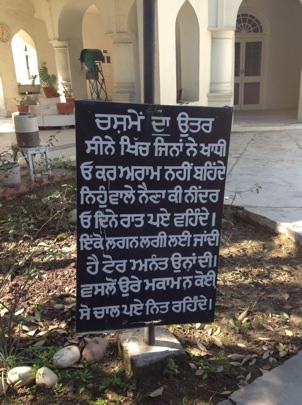
"Rubai", a short poem by Singh, on a plaque outside his memorial house

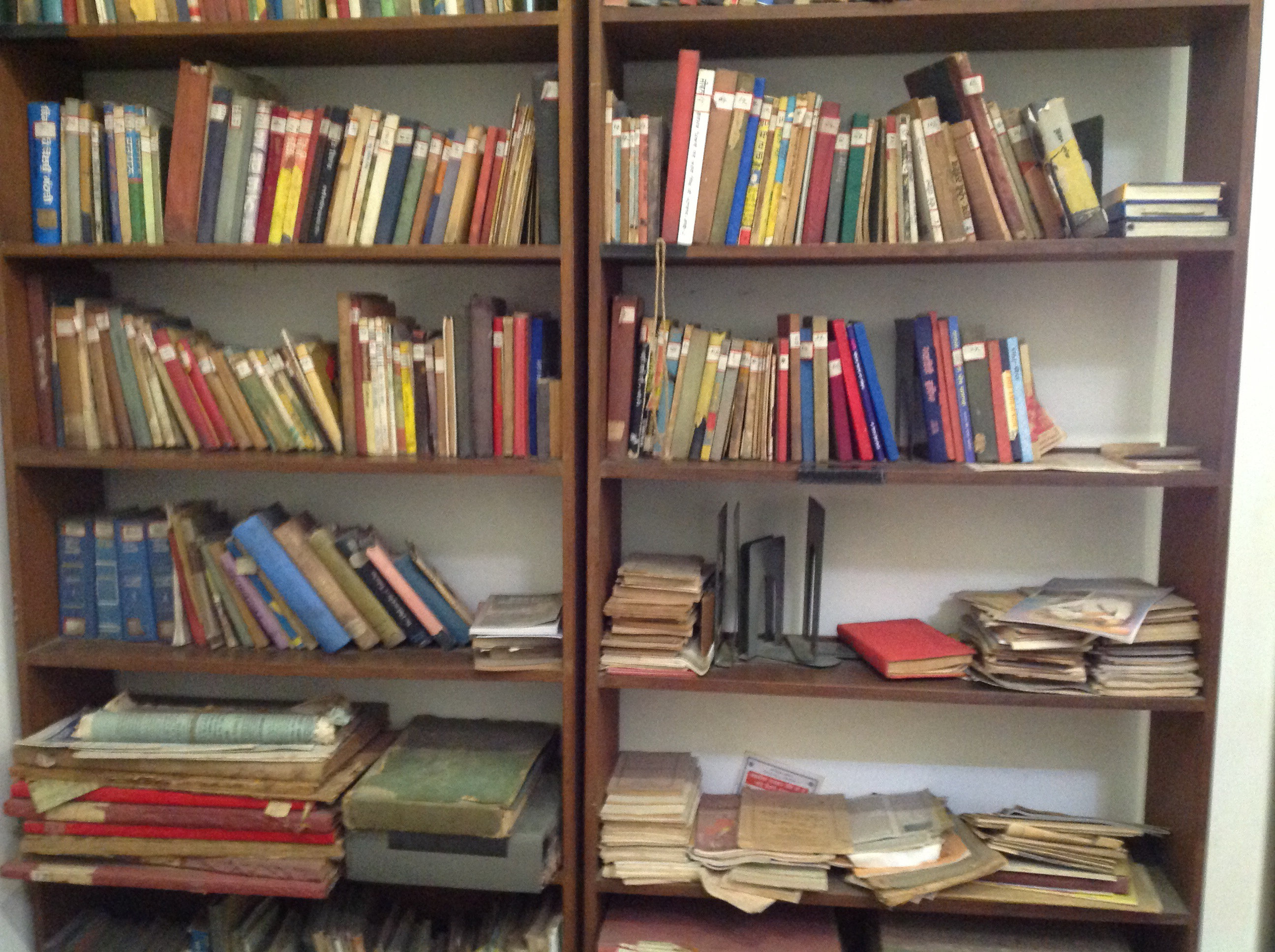
Book shelf in Bhai Vir Singh Memorial House

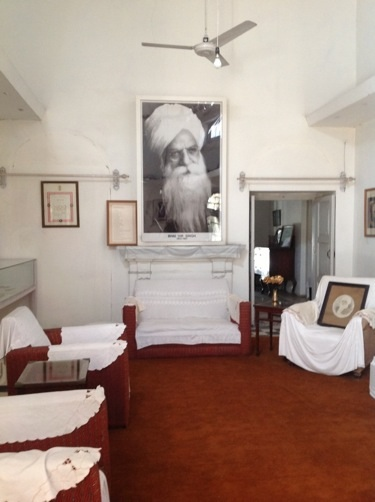
Drawing room in the Bhai Vir Singh Memorial House

== See also ==
- Surjit Patar
- Ajeet Cour
