= Kavi Santokh Singh =

Sikh historian, poet and writer (1787–1843/1844)

Kavi Bhai Santokh Singh Ji Churamani
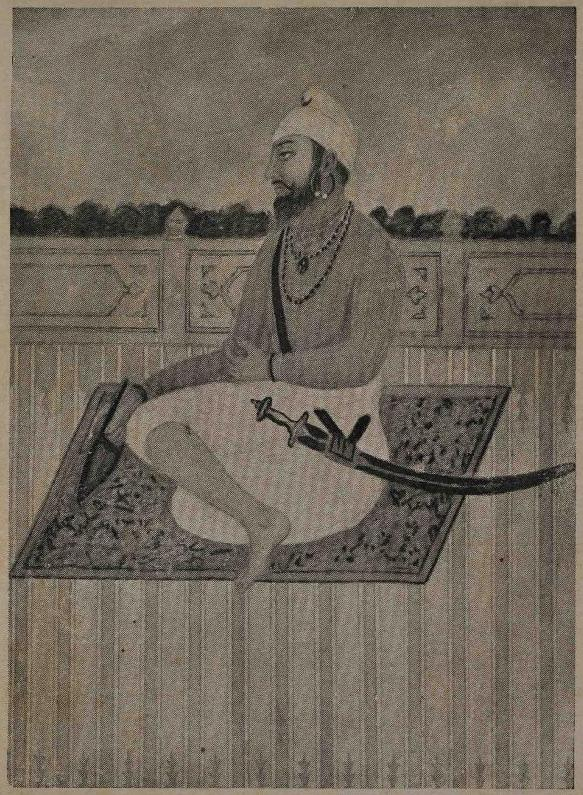
- Miniature painting of Kavi Santokh Singh seated on a terrace that was held by his descendants, circa 19th century
- Born: 8 October 1787; Sarai Nurdin, Punjab (modern-day Kila Kavi Santokh Singh, Tarn Taran district, Punjab, India)
- Died: 19 October 1843/1844 (aged 56 or 57)
- Known for: Sikh historian, literati and poet
- Spouse: Ram Kaur
- Parents: Deva Singh (father); Mai Rajadi (mother)
- Awards: Village of Morthali (land grant gifted by the ruler of Kaithal state)

Kavi Santokh Singh (Punjabi: ਕਵੀ ਸੰਤੋਖ ਸਿੰਘ) (8 October 1787 – 19 October 1843/1844) was a Sikh historian, poet and writer. He was such a prolific writer that the Sikh Reference Library at Darbar Sahib Amritsar was named after him, located within the Mahakavi Santokh Singh Hall. In addition to "Great Poet" (Mahākavī) Santokh Singh was also referred to as the Ferdowsi of Punjabi literature, Ferdowsi wrote ~50,000 verses while Santokh Singh's Suraj Prakash totals ~52,000. Other scholars have thought of Santokh Singh as akin to Vyasa. Gottlieb Wilhelm Leitner in 1883 wrote that, "Santokh Singh of Kantal in the Karnal District, has rendered his name immortal" through the production of his works. Although identified as being a Nirmala by scholars like Shackle, Jvala Singh argues that Santokh Singh was part of the Giani Samparda. Harjot Oberoi also notes Santokh Singh's connection to the gianis via him being a student of Giani Sant Singh.

== Biography ==
=== Early life ===
Santokh Singh was born into a poor yet educated family of cloth-printers (or tailors) on 8 October 1787 in Nurdin village (also known as Sarai Nurdin) near Tarn Taran to the northwest. His father was Deva Singh of the Karir subcaste of the Chhimba caste, and his mother was Mai Rajadi. He had an elder brother named Gurmukh Singh. He was associated with the Nirmala sect. His father, Deva Singh, had been well-educated in Gurbani and Vedantic philosophy. In his earliest years, his father was his mentor. After that, he was educated by his uncle, Ram Singh, at Amritsar in the market of Nihal Singh. Thereafter, he was instructed by the famous Giani Sant Singh of the Gianian Bunga in Amritsar after an encounter with the aforementioned. Until the end of the first decade of the 19th century, he had the personal bunga of his teacher, Giani Sant Singh, as his place of residence. He had a strong educational basis in Sanskrit but his command of Persian was lacking. For almost a decade, he studied Brajbhākhā, Awadhi, Sanskrit, Sikh scripture and history, and Vedāntic and Purāṇic literature under Sant Singh.

=== Association ===
According to Pashaura Singh (2003) Santokh Singh is regarded as the first recognized scholar of the Nirmala sect of Sikhism, Pashaura doubts the Nirmala school was in existence during Guru Gobind Singh's reign. This label however requires scrutiny, at no point in any of his writings does Santokh Singh claim himself to be a Nirmala, nor does he even ever mention Nirmalas. Vir Singh (writer) also never associates Santokh Singh with Nirmalas. Rather, because of Santokh Singh's instruction from Giani Sant Singh, his association can be seen to fall under the Giānīan Bungā, a learning institution beginning from Bhai Mani Singh. Giani Sant Singh (1768-1832), the head Giani of Amritsar, was a renowned scholars both inside and outside of Sikh circles. Throughout all of Santokh Singh's works he includes invocations (Mangalacharana) directed at his teacher, Giani Sant Singh.

=== Later life ===
He married Ram Kaur from Jagadhari, who belonged to the Rohilla subcaste, in 1821. After his time spent in Amritsar, he found employment as a katha (religious discourse) performer in the court of the chief of Dyalgarh, Bhagwant Singh, at the Buria estate, where he remained until 1823. In 1829, he came under the sponsorship of the ruler of Kaithal State, Udai Singh. After being impressed by his work, the ruler bestowed a jagir grant, of the village of Morthali, to the author in 1834. He died on 19 October 1843 or 1844, shortly after completing his final work of literature, the Suraj Prakash, which he had presented to the Sikh clergy at the Akal Bunga in Amritsar after completion.

=== Scholarly accomplishments ===
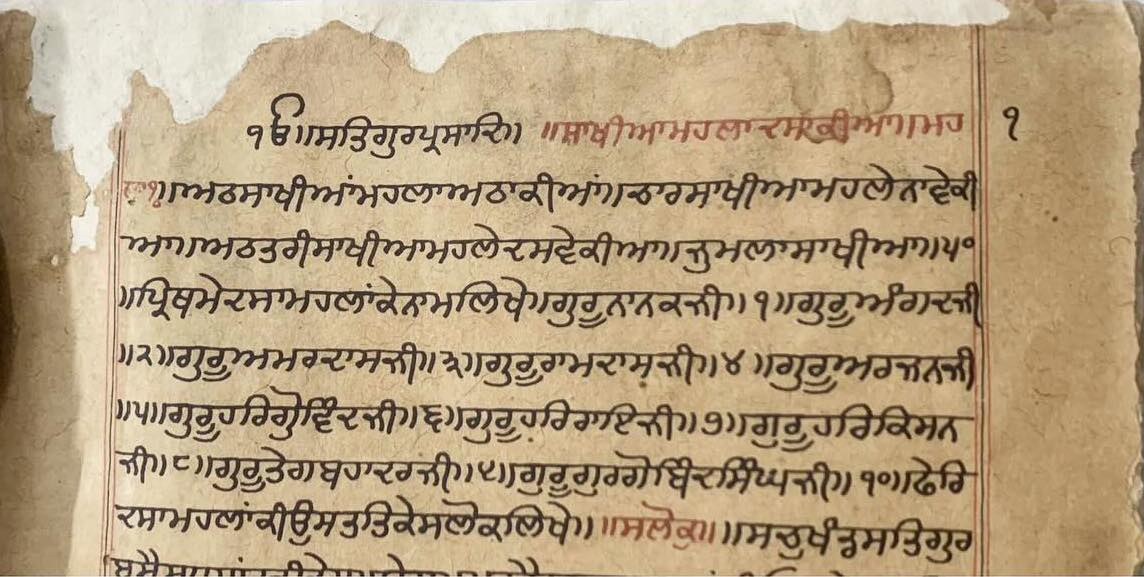
Detail of a restored folio of a Sakhi Pothi (anecdote manuscript) attributed to Kavi Santokh Singh

He expounded the Sikh scriptures based on Vedantic and Brahminical understandings. He wrote the Garab Ganjani Teeka to counter the interpretation of Guru Nanak's Japji Sahib composition by the Udasi scholar Anandghan. His magnum opus was the Suraj Prakash, completed in 1843, a volumous poetic text which documents in-detail the lives of all the Sikh gurus in fourteen volumes, intended as a sequel to his earlier work, Nanak Parkash. He was the first scholar to elaborate on the Dusht Daman incarnation of Guru Gobind Singh in a previous lifetime, connected to Hemkunt, a tale narrated by the guru in his Bachittar Natak composition.

== Assessment and legacy ==
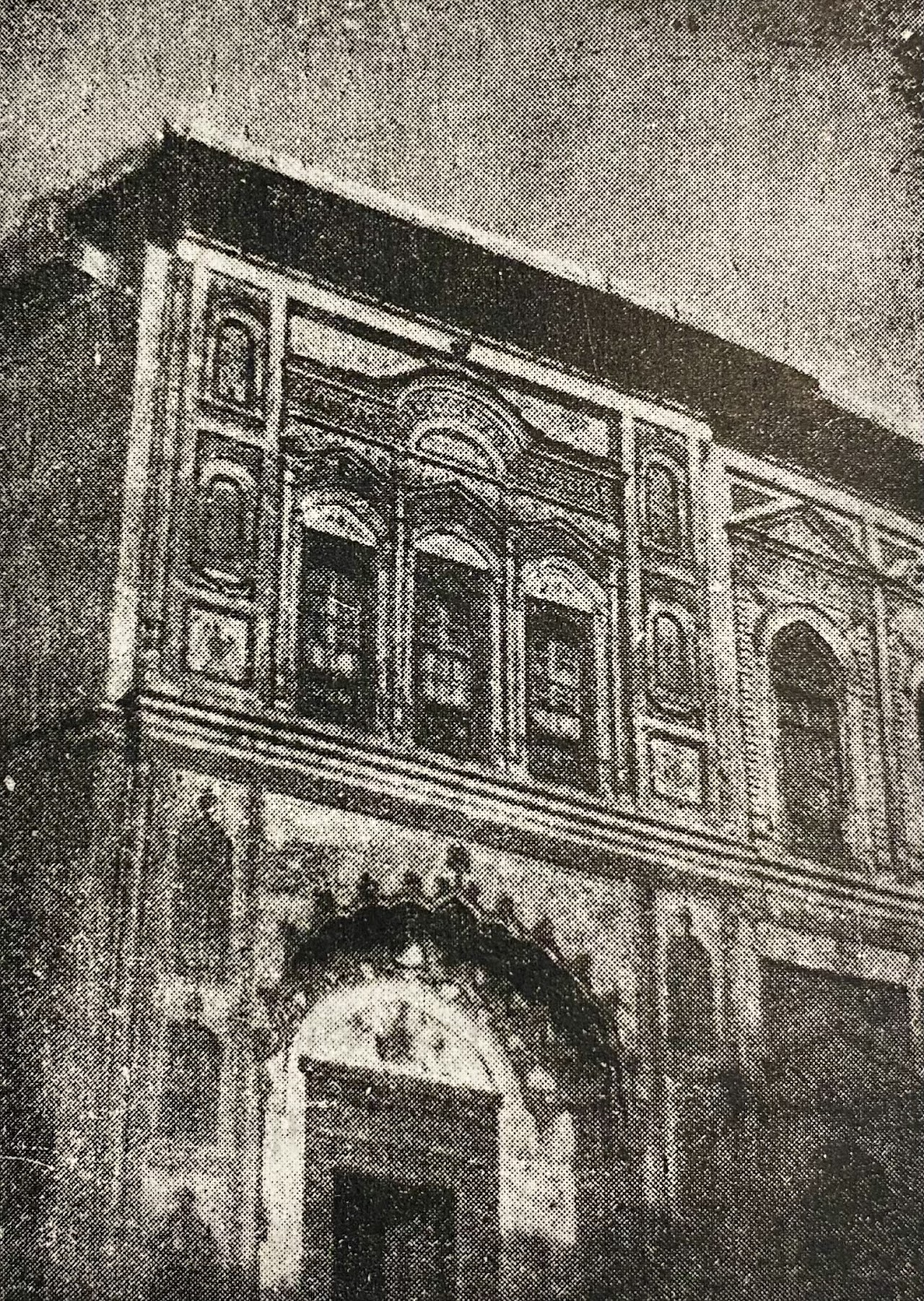
Photograph of Haveli Kavi Santokh Singh in Kaithal, taken by Vir Singh, ca.1920's. Re-discovered by Vir Singh, this haveli is where Santokh Singh wrote his Suraj Prakash.

Later Sikh scholars, such as Vir Singh, mention that Santokh Singh's works become the foundation for historical texts written in the late 19th and 20th centuries. Vir Singh (writer) himself would reference and summarize Santokh Singh's work in his own works. Louis Fenech writes:

"Santokh Singh’s massive Gur-Pratap Sūraj Granth, a text that still enjoys great currency among Sikh kathākars despite the fact that it has not been mined to the extent that it deserves by historians of Sikh tradition."

Bhai Vir Singh's respect and admiration for Santokh Singh can be seen throughout his publication, within the introduction of the text or in the footnotes. One example includes context clarifying that Santokh Singh's devotional focus:

“His writings were filled with such praise, faith and devotion to the Guru, in front of which no further proof is required that the Exalted Poet was a fully imbued Gursikh, an esteemed Sikh, and a Gurmukh who was drenched in the love of the Guru.”

Professor Ashanand Vohra, Member of Punjabi Board of Studies, Kurukshetra university, who Santokh Singh's Garab Ganjani Teeka (1829), comparing it with other Sanskrit and Brajbhasha alaṃkāraśāstras, writes:

"The Great Poet Bhai Santokh Singh Ji, the emperor of poetry on the Gurus, the crown jewel of the world's community of poets - as a result of his stand alone poetic practice & Ganges like flow of wisdom, his name will forever remain written in Indian Literature with golden letters."

Harjot Oberoi writes that Santokh Singh's Suraj Prakash "to this day is consulted by Sikh public and religious officiants for an explication of Sikh tenets and the life-stories of the gurus". Karam Singh was highly critical of Kavi Santokh Singh's works, specifically accusing him at taking sources at face value without questioning their historicity and veracity, such as in the case of the Bhai Bala janamsakhi tradition.

== Bibliography ==
1. Naam Kosh (1819) - a translation of the Sanskrit dictionary, Amar Kosa, into Braj
2. Garab Ganjani Teeka (1829) - a translation of the Japji Sahib written in the Sadhukari-language
3. Balmiki Ramyan (1834) - a translation of the Valmiki Ramayana into the Braj-language
4. Atam Purayan Teeka - a commentary on the Atam Puran of Vedantic philosophy (not extant)
5. Sri Guru Nanak Parkash (popularly known simply as the Nanak Prakash; 1823) - hagiographic text about Guru Nanak based on the Bhai Bala janamsakhi tradition
6. Sri Gur Partap Suraj Granth (popularly known simply as the Suraj Prakash; 1843) - hagiographic text about all the Sikh Gurus in Braj

== See also ==
- Ratan Singh Bhangu
- Pundit Tara Singh Narotam
- Giani Gian Singh
