= Suraj Prakash =

Sikh text by Kavi Santokh Singh (1843)

Suraj Prakash Gur Partap Suraj Granth
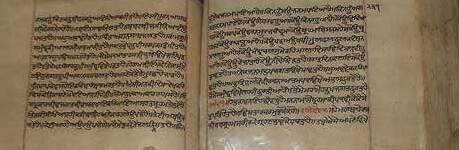
- Claimed original manuscript of the Gur Partap Suraj Granth by its author, Kavi Santokh Singh
- Author: Kavi Santokh Singh
- Language: Sanskritized Punjabi and Braj
- Genre: Sikhism
- Published: 1843 A.D.
- Publication place: Sikh Empire
- Preceded by: Guru Nanak Prakash

Suraj Prakash (Gurmukhi: ਸੂਰਜ ਪ੍ਰਕਾਸ਼, Sūraj Prakāś), also called Gurpartāp Sūraj Granth (Gurmukhi: ਗੁਰ ਪ੍ਰਤਾਪ ਸੂਰਜ ਗ੍ਰੰਥ lit. "The Sun-like Illumination of the Guru's Glory") or Sri Gur Pratap Suraj Granth, is a large, popular, and monumental hagiographic text about Sikh gurus written by Kavi Santokh Singh (1787–1843) and published in 1843 CE. It consists of life legends performed by Sikh Gurus and historic Sikhs such as Baba Banda Bahadur, in 51,820 verses (60,000 when including Nanak Prakash). Most modern writing on the Sikh gurus relies on this text and it remains the most important work on the lives of the Sikh gurus. The work was written in the Braj language, in verse form.

== Overview ==
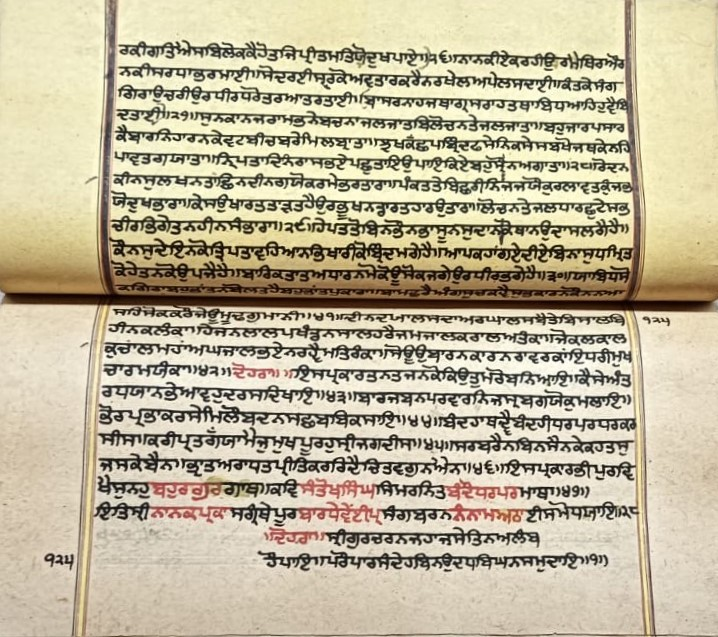
Folios of a manuscript of the Nanak Prakash, original work by Kavi Santokh Singh, 1838. This work preceded the later Suraj Prakash, which expanded upon it.

The Suraj Prakash was written in the Braj Bhasha language in Gurmukhi script, with significant use of Sanskrit words. It is generally considered to include the author's previous work on Guru Nanak, the Nanak Prakash (1824). In total the text has 1281 chapters spread across twenty two sections. Linguist Jvala Singh wrote in 2023:

"As written by Santokh Singh, when including the sections related to Guru Nanak in the Nanak Prakāsh (1824), the entire collection is constructed in twenty two sections, Guru Nanak’s portions called the sun rise and sun set, pūrabāradh and uttarāradh, Guru Angad to Guru Tegh Bahadur are located within sections called the twelve rāśī, zodiac signs, and Guru Gobind Singh’s sections within the six seasons, che rutān, and two solstices, do ayan, with each chapter within these sections called aṇshū or sunray. Titled the Gurpratap Suraj Granth, the Sun-like-Illumination of the Guru’s Glory, the structure’s micro to macro expansion of the solar experiences represents a continuity between the Gurus themselves via changing forms and manifestations."

Structure
Section	Guru
Nanak Prakash (sunrise & sunset )	Guru Nanak
Raas 1-12 (twelve zodiac signs)	Guru Angad to Guru Tegh Bahadur
Rut 1-6 (six seasons)	Guru Gobind Singh
Ayan 1-2 (summer & winter solstice)	Guru Gobind Singh

Chawla (2024) divides the Suraj Prakash as follows:

- Sri Guru Nanak Prakash, in two sections
- Sri Guru Pratap Suraj proper, divided into portions called ruth ("season"), and further subdivided into chapters called anshu ("rays")

== Sources ==
Kavi Santokh Singh constructed his text by utilising a broad range of source material including:

- Guru Granth Sahib
- Dasam Granth
- Writings of Bhai Gurdas
- Janamsakhis
- Writings associated with Bhai Mani Singh:
  - Sikhan Di Bhagatmala
  - Gurbilas Patshahi 6
  - Gurbilas Patshahi 10
- Mahima Prakash
- Sau Sakhi of Ram Koer

Above all, the author states that he has written the history according and pursuant to Guru Granth Sahib - ਗ੍ਰੰਥ ਅਨੁਸਾਰ ਕਥਾ ਮੈਂ ਰੀਤਾ (I have written these stories according to the Guru Granth).

== Reception ==
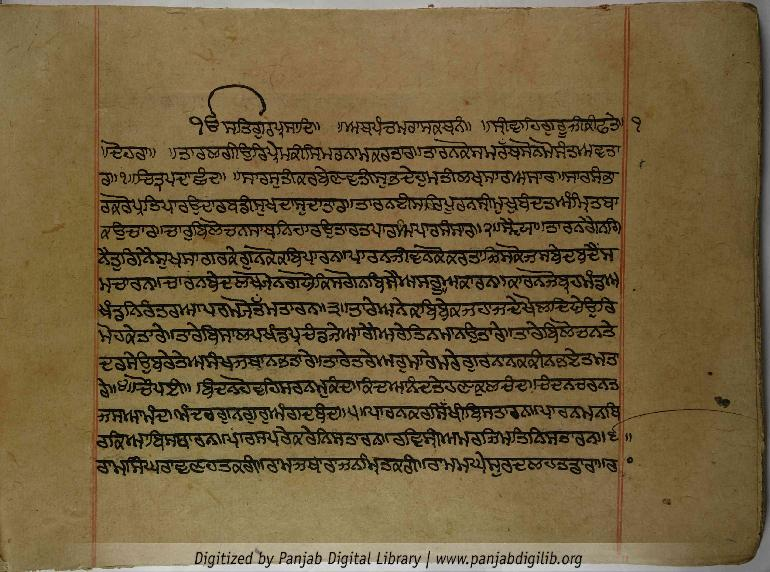
Folio one (recto) of a Suraj Prakash manuscript (MN-001474). Digitised by the Panjab Digital Library.

By the 1880s the text had received widespread appraisal and become the established foundation source to draw from. The renowned Patna Sahib Mahant and Braj poet, Sumer Singh (1847-1903), wrote, “[T]here is no other text which is equivalent, understand it as the treasure trove of the guru’s praise, the exalted Santokh Singh received great admiration for creating this vessel to liberate all the Singhs”. However, according to W. H. McLeod (1932–2009), the Suraj Prakash contains a "somewhat higher proportion" of Sikh history, but is mostly ahistorical mythology and an untrustworthy source of Sikh history. Max Arthur Macauliffe extensively but selectively used the Suraj Prakash, in cooperation with Kahn Singh Nabha, for his six-volume The Sikh Religion series (1909) that presented Sikh scriptures and history to the Western world in the early 20th century. While Macauliffe used it extensively in his Sikh Gurus and history sections, he added that the Suraj Prakash is of doubtful trustworthiness because the education and heritage of its author Santokh Singh was "largely tinctured with Hinduism". Vir Singh however noted that Suraj Prakash essentially became the foundation for historical texts written in the late 19th and early 20th centuries:

"The writers, namely Baba Banesha Singh Ji Bedi specifically took from this text [Sūraj Prakāsh] to write his Gur Nanak Sūrayodai. Giani Gian Singh took so much from this text that his first portion of his historical text has the second name of Vārtik Sūraj Prakāsh. Pandit Giani Bhai Hazara Singh Ji wrote and published a brief of the text named Sūraj Prakāsh Cūrṇakā. From reading the works of Baba Prem Singh it’s clear that their text is also based on this text, and its clear countless other authors have written small texts based on this text [Sūraj Prakāsh]. Khalsa Tract Society has also taken from this source, along with other research, created Punjabi literature. Maccaulfie did look into other sources and research but his main source was this text. Khursaid Khalsa in Urdu also took from this text. Khursaid also means Sūraj [sun]. Other poets who would write in baitan or lovely chand metres have taken from this text and continue to do so."

Illustrations on both sides of a page depicting Guru Tegh Bahadur and Guru Gobind Singh from the "Gur Pratap Suraj Granth", printed copy, ca.1884

Suraj Prakash is a popular text in the Sikh community, profusely poetic, and sometimes recited in a katha form. Vir Singh, in the introduction to his printed publication of Suraj Prakash, said:

“In Gurdwaras, Deras, Dharamsalas, courts and in houses, the katha spread so widely and many copies of this text spread and became established in Gurdwaras. In the late afternoon a tradition started in villages and cities where people would go to Gurdwaras to listen to this katha. This tradition remained alive and withstood the grasp and effect from the Singh Sabha movement”.

According to Pratibha Chawla (2024), the work is monumental in its influence and scope, rivalling the classical literature of the same genre.

== Scholarly analysis ==
Scholars such as W. H. McLeod around 1968 and Max Arthur Macauliffe in 1909 questioned the historical value of the text due to mythological components. Others viewed the material included as Vedantic doctrines of Udasis and Nirmalas. The text also incorporates some ideas of the Hindalis considered heretical by Khalsa Sikhs. According to Pashaura Singh this may have been the result of the traditional Sikh schools in Amritsar of the 18th and 19th centuries including Vedanta with standard Sikh teachings. The text since McLeod and Macauliffe's critiques has been understudied; Anne Murphy (2012) writes, "this is not a text that has been used a great deal by historians, probably due to its reputation for being “Hinduised”— somewhat unfairly, perhaps, given the prevalence of “mythological” elements within other comparable texts that are referred to more often." Bhai Vir Singh remarks that the mythology and Puranic references within Suraj Prakash are utilised as metaphors, as a way to explain the deeds, role, and powers of the Gurus. He argues that in the context of texts related to spiritual personalities, like the Gurus, stories including miracles (karāmāt) are used to "open the locks of the heart" of the listener/reader, in a way that purely scientific historical literature could not do.

The text has been criticised as being "Hinduised", however it clearly articulates the Khalsa as the 'Third' (ਤੀਜਾ / ਤੀਸਰ ਪੰਥ), distinct from the Hindu and Turk (Islamic) duality. The confusion pertains to 18th century texts like Gurbilas as well. Murphy notes the problem related to context:

"we can see in eighteenth century Punjabi Brajbhasha texts that express Sikh communitarian perspectives that Sikhs were contained within a sense of ‘Hindu’ in broad contrastive terms, at the same time that Sikh positions were portrayed as representing a clearly separate religious/cultural tradition alongside other traditions that were portrayed as similarly distinct (some of which are now included under the umbrella term ‘Hindu’) "

Ganda Singh criticized how Santokh Singh accepted all the Sikh sources he used in compiling the work, such as the Mehma Prakash and Sau Sakhi, as authentic without questioning their reliability, thus casting doubt on the reliability of the Suraj Granth itself.

== Printed editions ==
Suraj Prakash was first edited by Vir Singh in 14 volumes, with Punjabi footnotes (1926–1935). Jvala Singh in 2023 argued that this publication safeguarded the text from attack by ironcladding it within a western critical apparatus. This apparatus included a lengthy 250-page introduction, explanatory footnotes, and additional historical resources, shaping the audience's expectations, reactions and modes of appreciation. He further suggested Vir Singh was pushing back against Max Arthur Macauliffe and other Singh Sabha intellectuals who had criticized the text and author.

== Translations ==
Sri Guru Granth Sahib Ji Academy translated the Suraj Parkash word-by-word novelised into books on the lives of the Sikh gurus. The lives of Guru Angad, Guru Arjan, and Guru Har Krishan have been completed and published in both hardcopy and e-copy formats available from their website. The Suraj Prakash is currently being translated into English in a podcast format by Jvala Singh on the Suraj Podcast, which is a chapter by chapter translation and summary. Sikh Translations translated the table of contents of the work to English. A complete English translation of the work by Jaswinder Singh Sehmbi can be found at gurupurshotam.com. Other online English translations of select passages of the text can be found at manglacharan.com.

== See also ==
- Panth Prakash
- Twarikh Guru Khalsa
- Mahan Kosh
