= Parchian Satigura Dian =

Sikh text

Parchian Satigura Dian or Parchian Sewa Das, also known simply as Parchian is a Sikh text written in Old Punjabi that contains 50 sakhis (stories) related to the Sikh gurus, mostly involving Guru Gobind Singh and Guru Tegh Bahadur. The text is believed to have been written by Sewa Das in the 18th century, perhaps in 1741 specifically. It is a hagiographical work that is similar to the Gurbilases genre and the later Suraj Prakash. The work is classified as part of the parchai literary genre of mediaeval India, which was practiced by the Sewapanthi sect of Sikhism. However, according to Gurdev Singh, Sewa Das was an Udasi, which he assumes due to the appending of the word Udasi to his name, and is distinguished from Sewa Ram, who was a Sewapanthi. Sulakhan Singh classifies it as an Udasi work. The text is both narrative and didactic. The work is also known as Parchian Guru Gobind Singh.

The text is dated within the 18th century, usually with 1741 being given as its date of composition, although Kharak Singh and Gurtej Singh date the text to 1708 while Gurinder Singh Mann dates it to 1709. Karamjit K. Malhotra dates it to 1708. There are multiple manuscripts of the text. An undated manuscript is kept in the collection of the Sikh History Research Department of Khalsa College, Amritsar. It was first published in 1961 under the title Parchian Sewa Das by the Bhasha Vibhag, Punjab, being edited by Hari Singh Qadian, with another edition being published in 1978.

The text was edited and translated by Kharak Singh and Gurtej Singh, published in 1995 by the Institute of Sikh Studies, Chandigarh. The following number of sakhis related to each guru is as follows:

- Guru Nanak: one
- Guru Angad: one
- Guru Amar Das: one
- Guru Ram Das: one (relating to Guru Ram Das humbly wiping the feet of Sri Chand with his beard)
- Guru Arjan: one
- Guru Hargobind: one
- Guru Har Rai: one
- Guru Har Krishan: one
- Guru Tegh Bahadur: four
- Guru Gobind Singh: thirty-eight
