= Sacred trees in Sikhism =

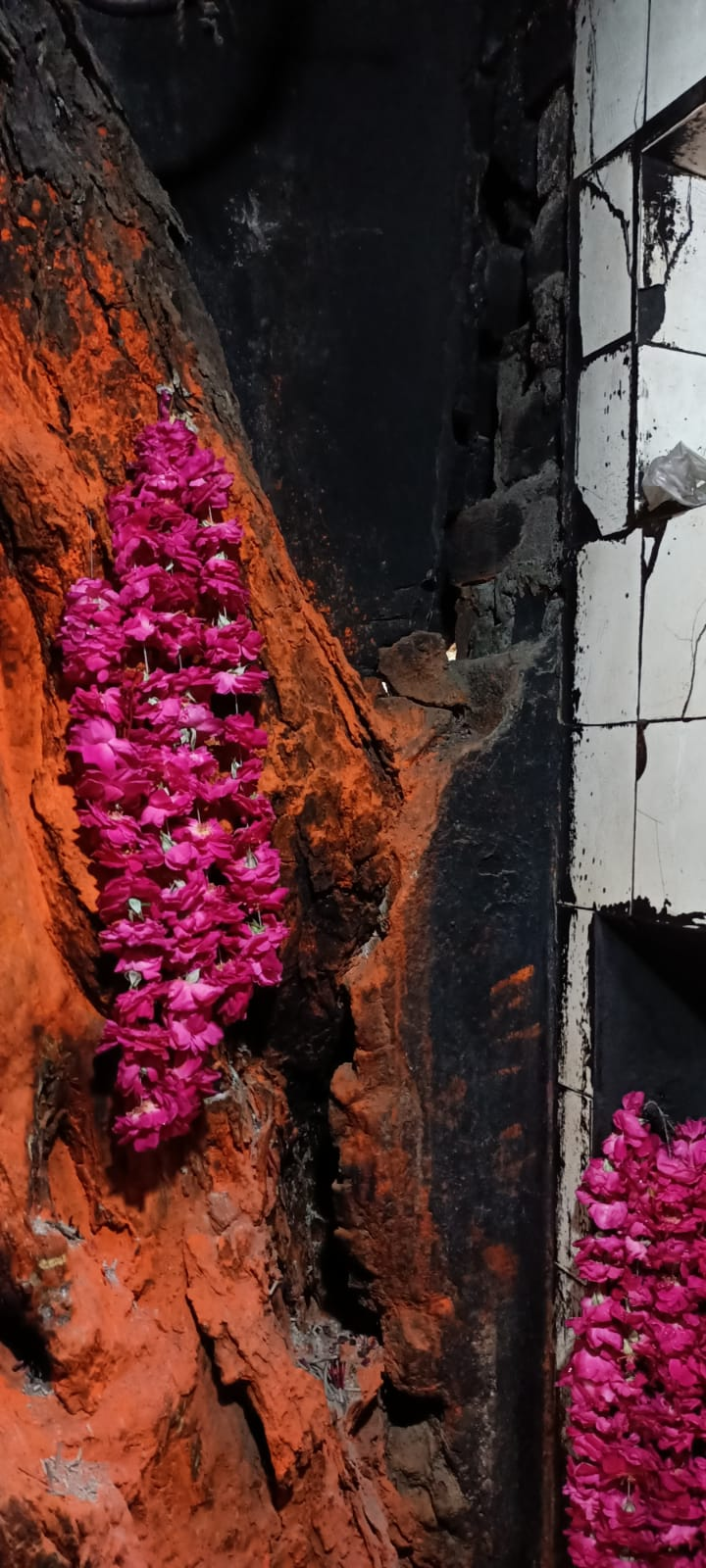
Mai-Di-Beri tree situated at the historical site of Lal Khoohi in Lahore, Pakistan, where Guru Arjan was tortured.

There are a number of sacred trees considered sacred in the Sikh religion. As many as fifty-eight Sikh shrines are associated with particular trees of importance, with up to nineteen tree species being represented amongst these sacred trees. Many of the sacred trees are associated with miraculous sakhis or historical events.

== Background ==
In India, the ber (Indian jujube) tree and its fruit is widespread and has played a prominent role in Indic culture since ancient times. The tree and its fruit finds mention in Sanskrit literature, such as in religious texts where the tree is sanctified. The name given to the tree varies by the local Indian language. The Sikh gurus themselves favoured the planting of jujube trees at locations of religious significance, such as gurdwaras. At the Golden Temple complex in Amritsar, one can find jujube trees which hold religious importance to Sikhs. Other Sikh shrines where celebrated trees that are held sacred by Sikhs exist are Gurdwara Ber Sahib in Sultanpur Lodhi, Gurdwara Shish Ganj Sahib in Anandpur Sahib, and Gurdwara Katana Sahib in Ludhiana. Whilst jujube trees tend to live for around 100 years, three prominent ones located within the confines of the Golden Temple complex have lived four times the expected lifespan of jujube trees. In the Sikh religion, trees are celebrated as Sabaj Mandir (green temples).

Research by Damanbir Singh Jaspal has identified 48 historic Sikh shrines associated with the names of seventeen indigenous species of trees. Some tree-species which hold sanctity in Sikhism are:

- Bohr (Ficus bengalensis)
- Pipli (Ficus religiosa)
- Jand (Prosopis spicigera) - revered for having leaves that are used for feeding horses
- Garna (Capparis horrida)
- Karir (Capparis aaphylla)
- Phalahi (Acacia modeta)
- Reru (Mimasa leucophloea)
- Luhura (Cordia latifolia)
- Tahli (Shisham) - revered for its wood
- Imli (Tamarind) - revered for having both providing food and its medicinal value
- Amb (Mangifera indica)
- Harian velan
- Neem (margassa) (Azadirachta indica) - revered for having medicinal value
- Ritha (Sapindus mukorosa)
- Kalp (Mitragina parvifolia)
- Ber (Zizyphus jujube) - revered for having sweet fruit

The tree species highly-regarded in Sikhism are those which have practical uses for humans, such as by providing sustenance, security, or shelter. The Sikh gurus were mobile preachers, travelling around, thus when they halted at a tree for shade, food, or shelter, the tree they halted at would gain religious significance. This explains why some revered trees are older than the period of the Sikh gurus (such as the tree at Gurdwara Tahli Sahib in Garhshankar, Nawanshahr). Eventually, religious structures would be constructed around these trees to mark permanent shrines. In Leh, there is a Datun (Margossa) tree revered by both Muslims and Buddhists which is believed to have sprouted from a datun planted by Guru Nanak during his second udasi (travels). According to Jaswinder Singh Brar, most of the trees viewed as sacred by Sikhs are ber trees due to the tree's ability to survive for long periods of time without water and many other tree species were extirpated due to them being cleared for agriculture. In India, Sikhs consider the pruned wood and leaves of the sacred ber trees as a benediction from the Sikh gurus, with devotees catching naturally-dropped fruits with dupattas during the fruiting season between February and March.

== List ==
=== Golden Temple complex ===
==== Dukh Bhanjani Ber ====
The Dukh Bhanjani Ber (meaning "the tree which removes sorrows") is a jujube tree (belonging to the Ziziphus jujuba species) located within the Golden Temple complex in Amritsar. Specifically, it is located on the eastern side of the parikarma. Sikhs believe a leper, who was the husband of Bibi Rajani, was cured after bathing in the small body of water near this tree. Sikhs believe the tree was named "Dukh Bhanjani" by Guru Ram Das. The small body of water that once existed near the tree was believed to have existed since ancient times. This body of water was later expanded, becoming the basis for the sarovar of the current temple complex. The tree is commonly used as a prayer site for petitionary prayers, such as ones asking for cures regarding severe, unknown, and untreatable diseases and infertility. Many pilgrims believe that taking a dip in the water near the tree will heal ailments. It is perhaps the second-oldest ber tree in India, after the Baba Buddha Ber.

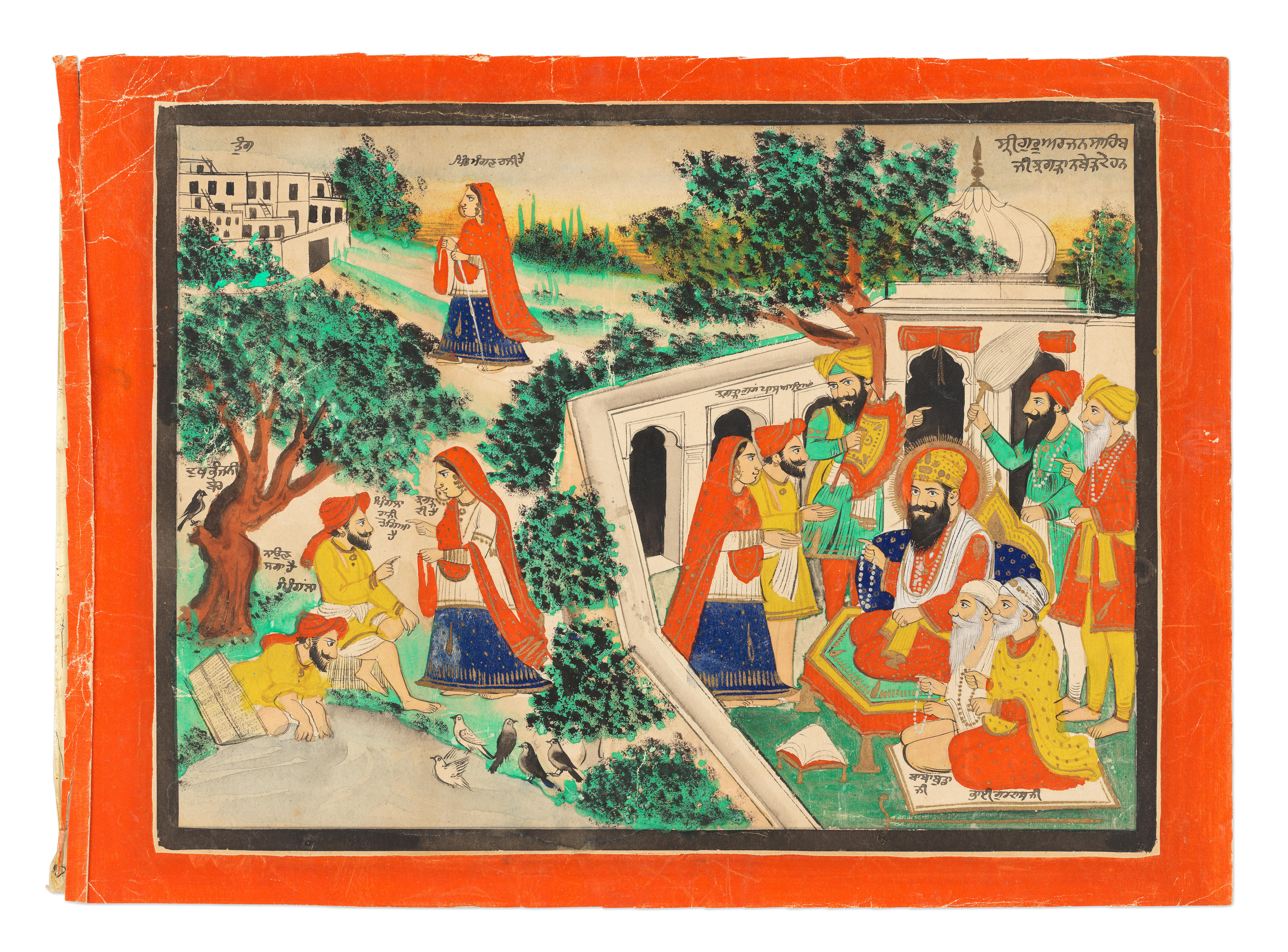
Painting depicting Guru Ram Das and the story of Dukh Bhanjani - the leper husband of Bibi Rajani was cured by taking a dip in the pond. Attributed to Gian Singh Naqqash. Opaque watercolour on paper, Amritsar, early 20th century

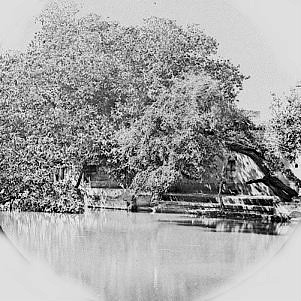
Dukh Bhanjani Beri tree, circa 1884

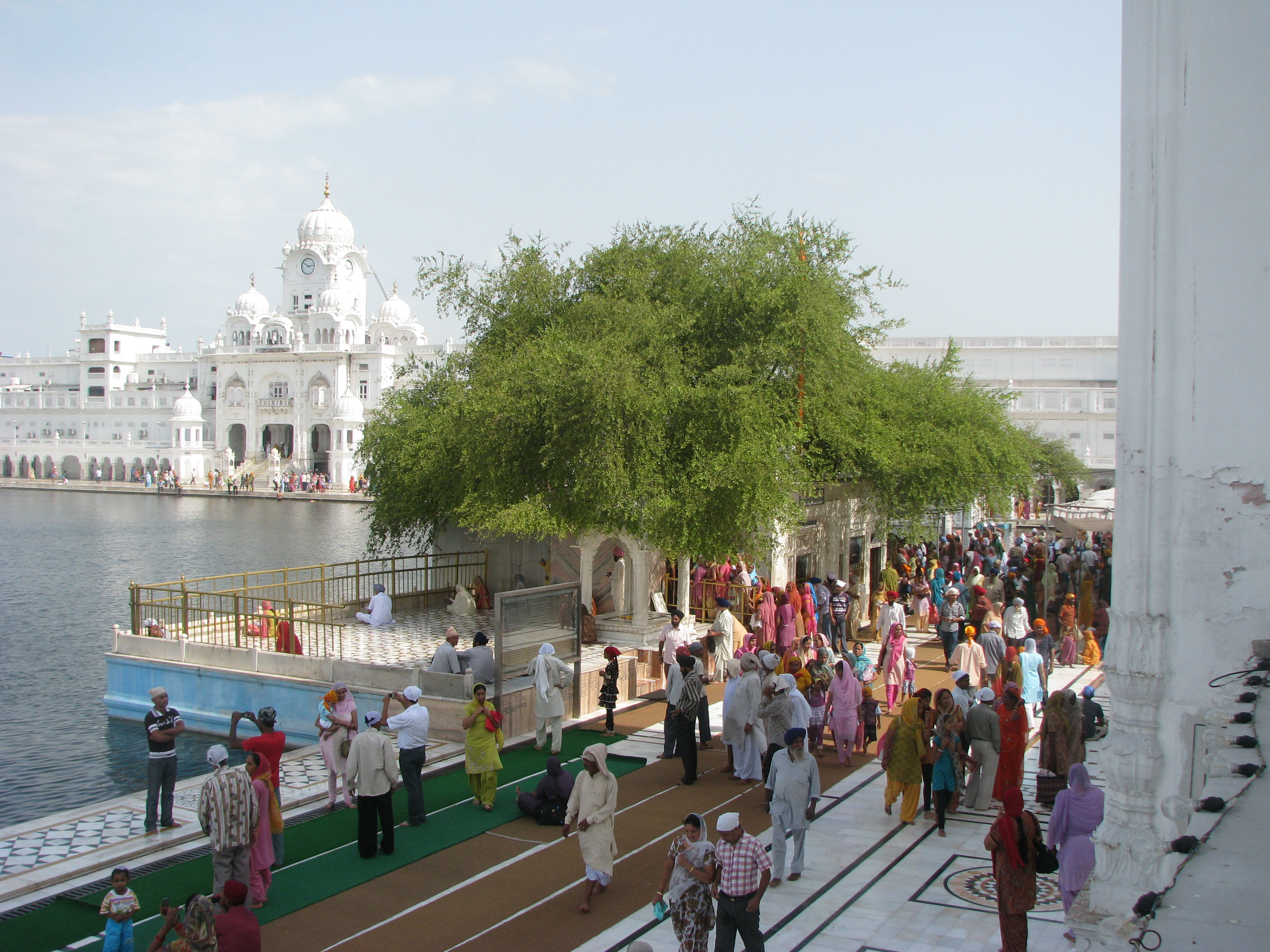
Dukh Bhanjani Beri, 2010

==== Ber Baba Budha Sahib ====
The Ber Baba Budha Sahib (meaning "tree of Baba Budha") is another jujube tree located also in the Golden temple complex in Amritsar. The Ber Baba Budha Sahib tree is over 440-years-old (dating back to circa 1573). It is perhaps the oldest ber tree in India. The tree is associated with a prime religious figure of early Sikhism, Baba Budda.

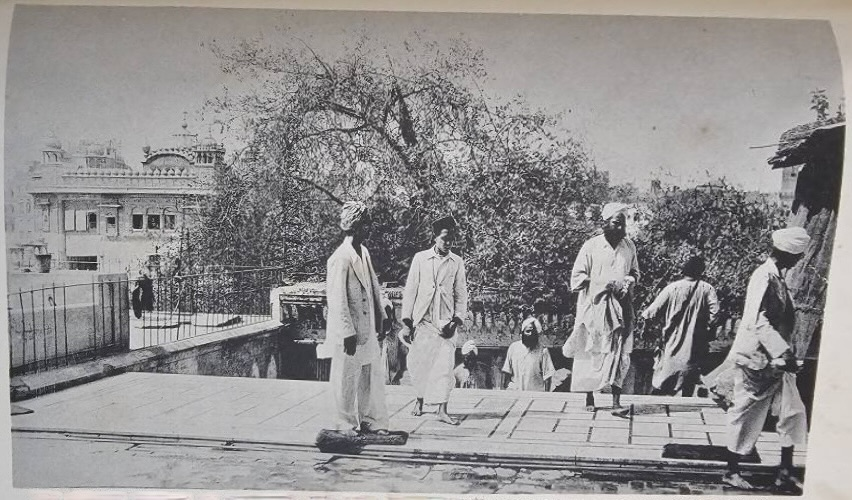
Photogravure of the Baba Buddha jujube tree within the Golden Temple complex in Amritsar, ca.1910's

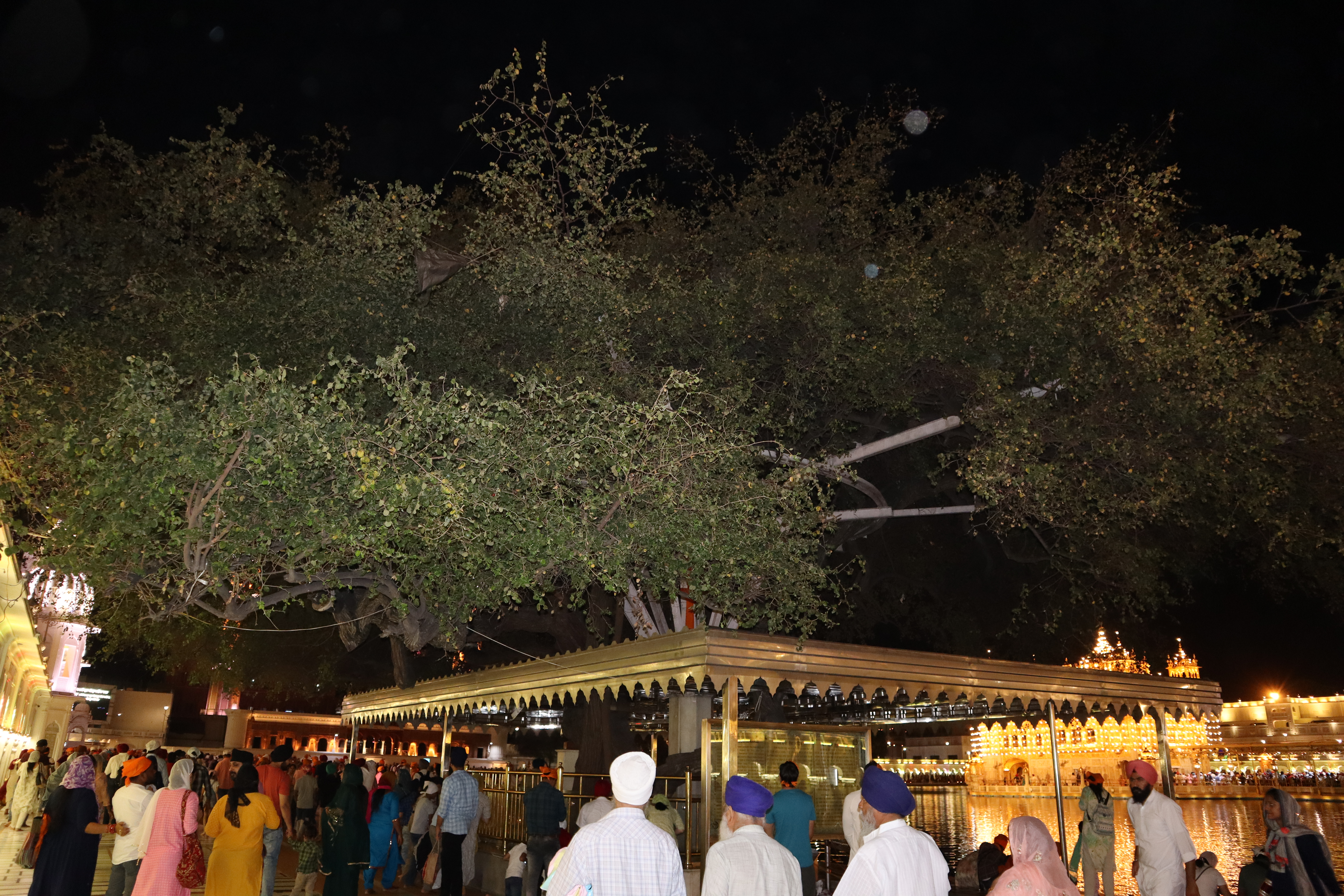
Photograph of the Baba Budha Beri tree at-night within the Golden Temple complex, Amritsar, Punjab, India, April 2023

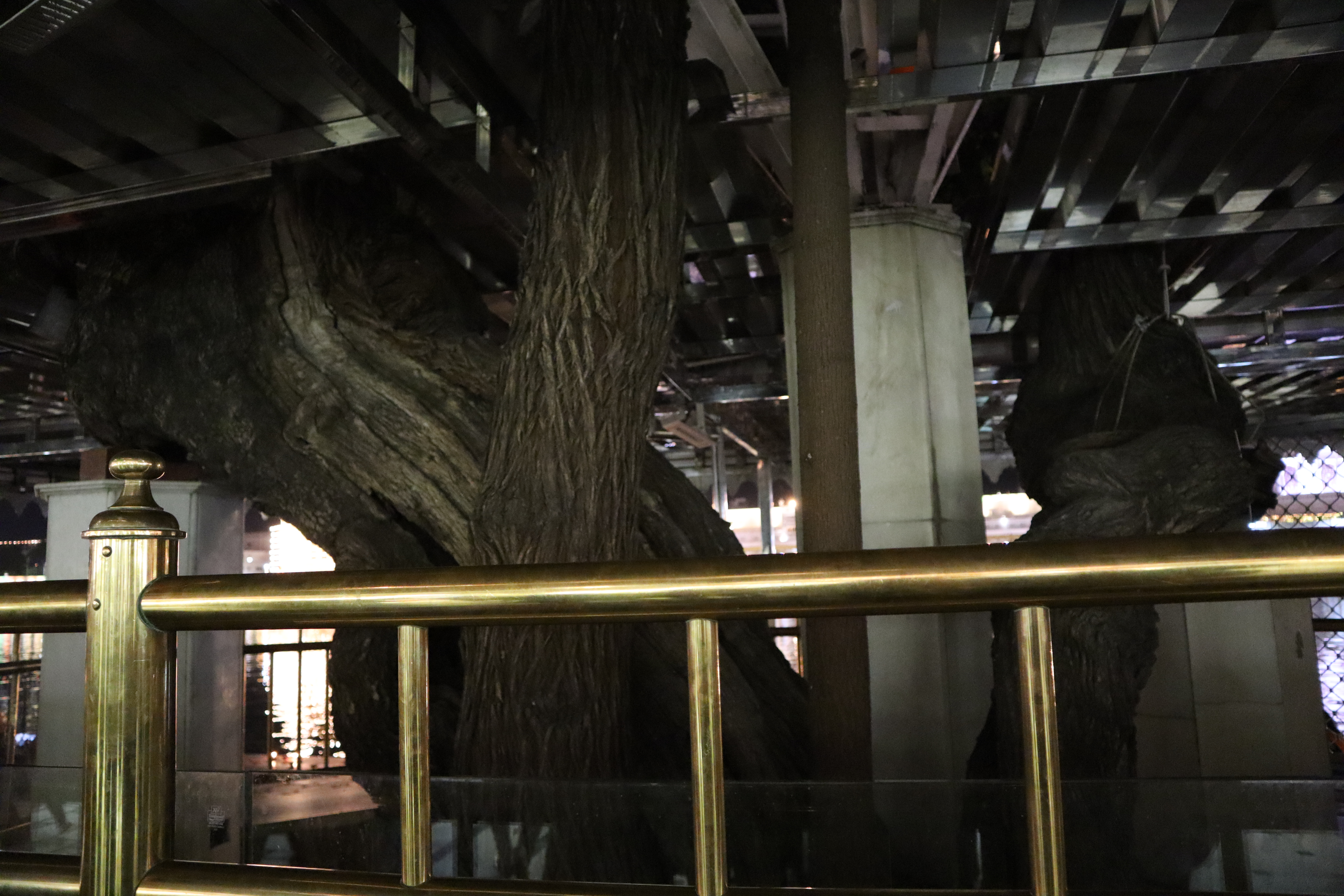
Photograph of the base-trunk and main-branches of the Baba Budha Beri tree within the Golden Temple complex, Amritsar, Punjab, India, April 2023

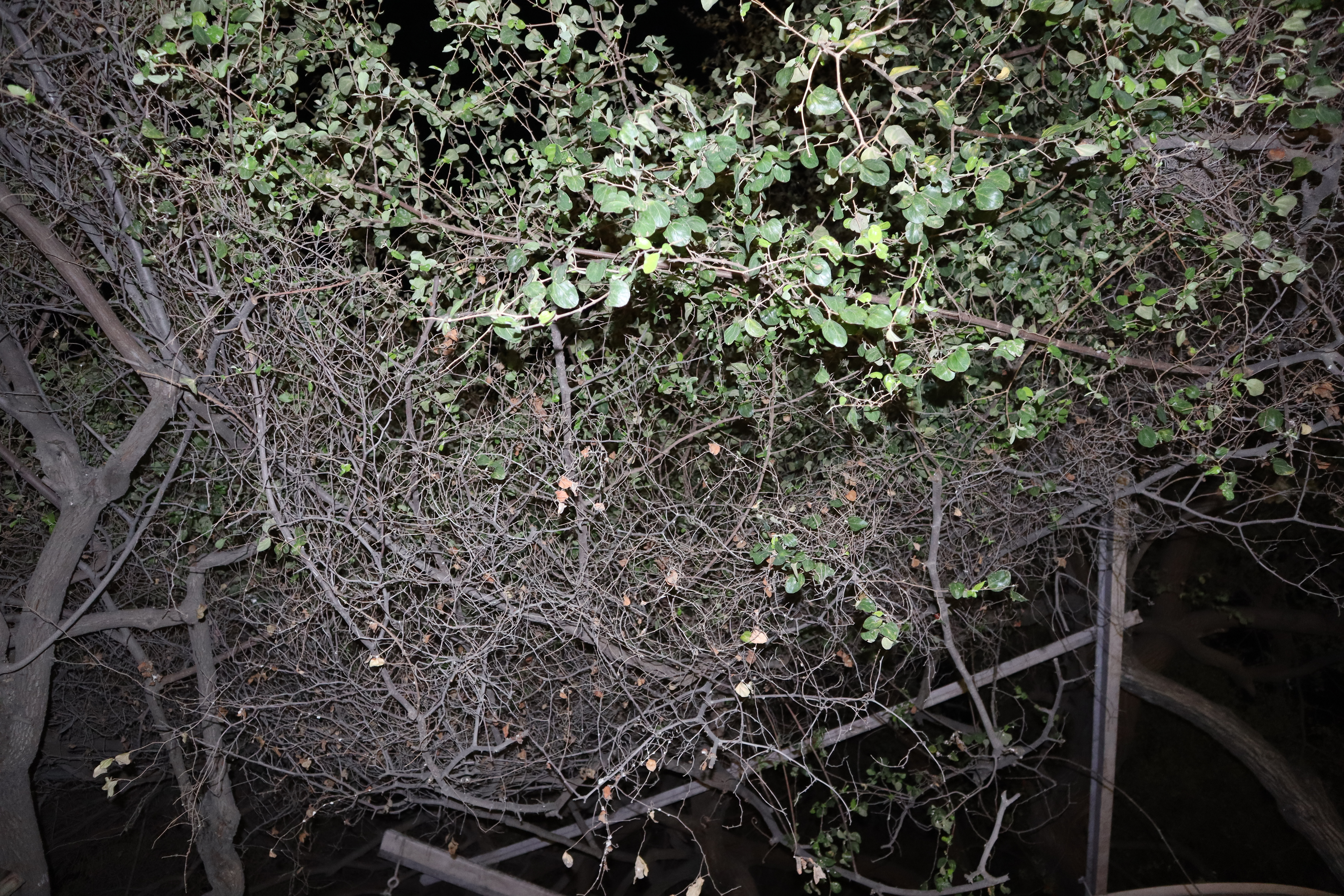
Photograph of foliage of the Baba Budha Beri tree within the Golden Temple complex, Amritsar, Punjab, India, April 2023

==== Lachhi Ber ====
Another jujube tree within the Golden Temple complex is known as the Lachhi Ber.

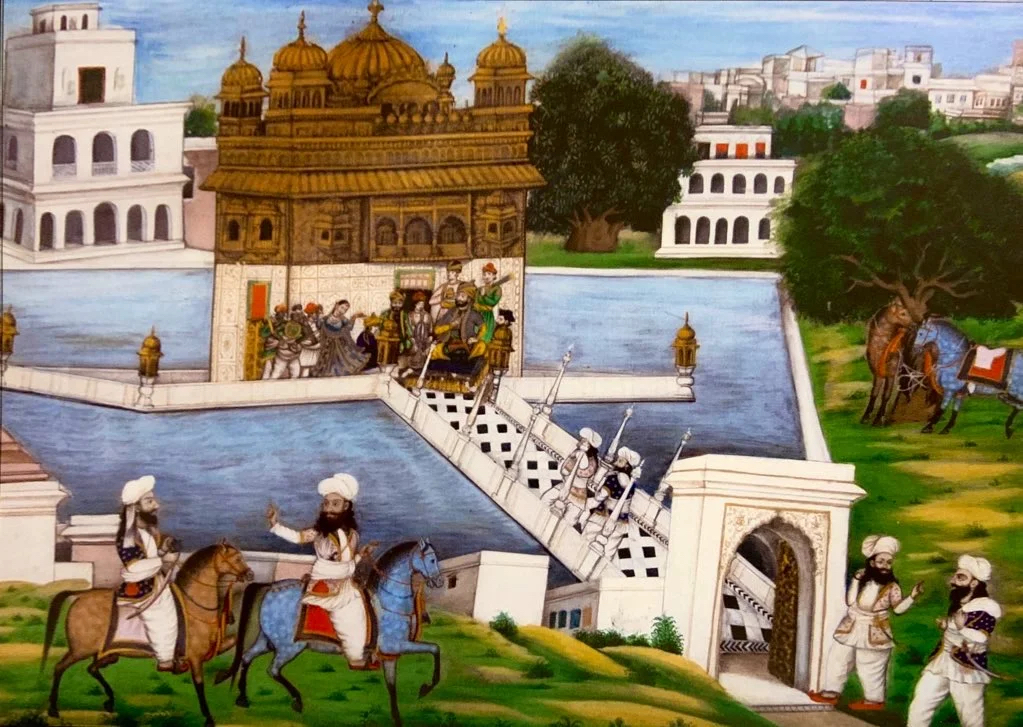
Bhai Sukha and Bhai Mehtab Singh confront Massa Ranghar after tying their horses to the Lachhi Ber tree, circa 19th century

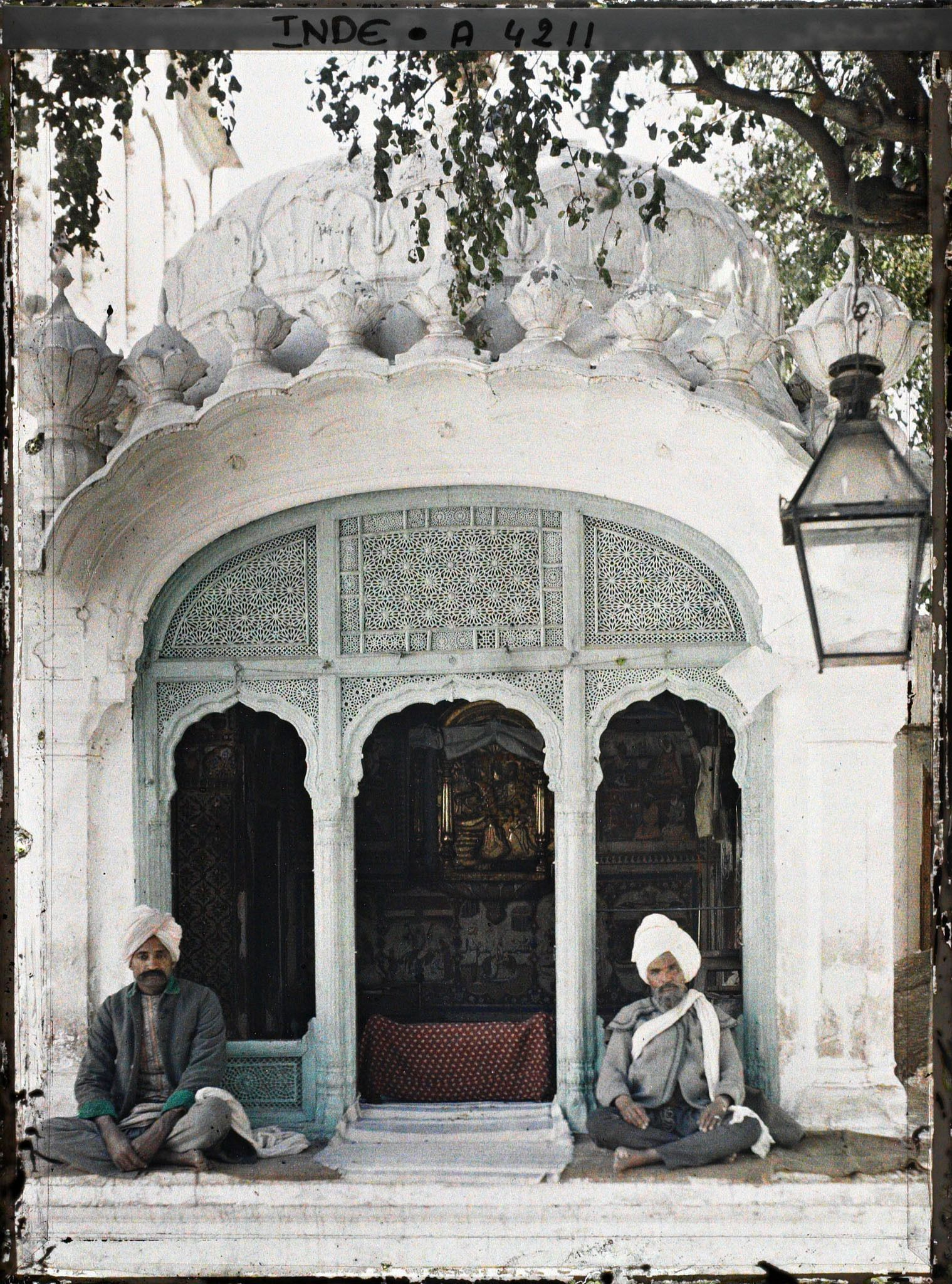
True-colour photograph of Gurdwara Sri Lachi Ber Sahib, taken by Stéphane Passet, 15 January 1914

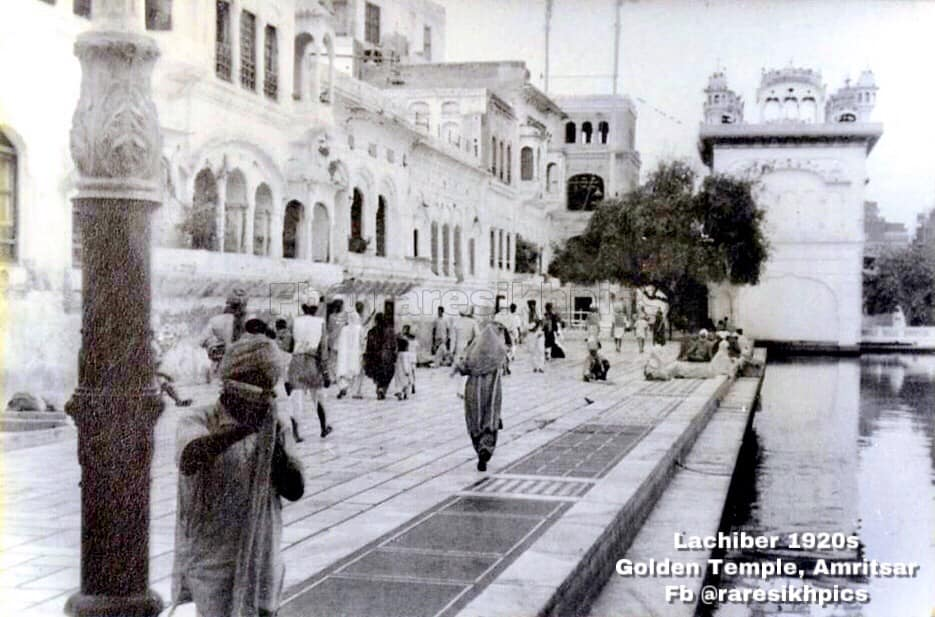
Photograph of the Lachhi Ber, Golden Temple, circa 1920-30's

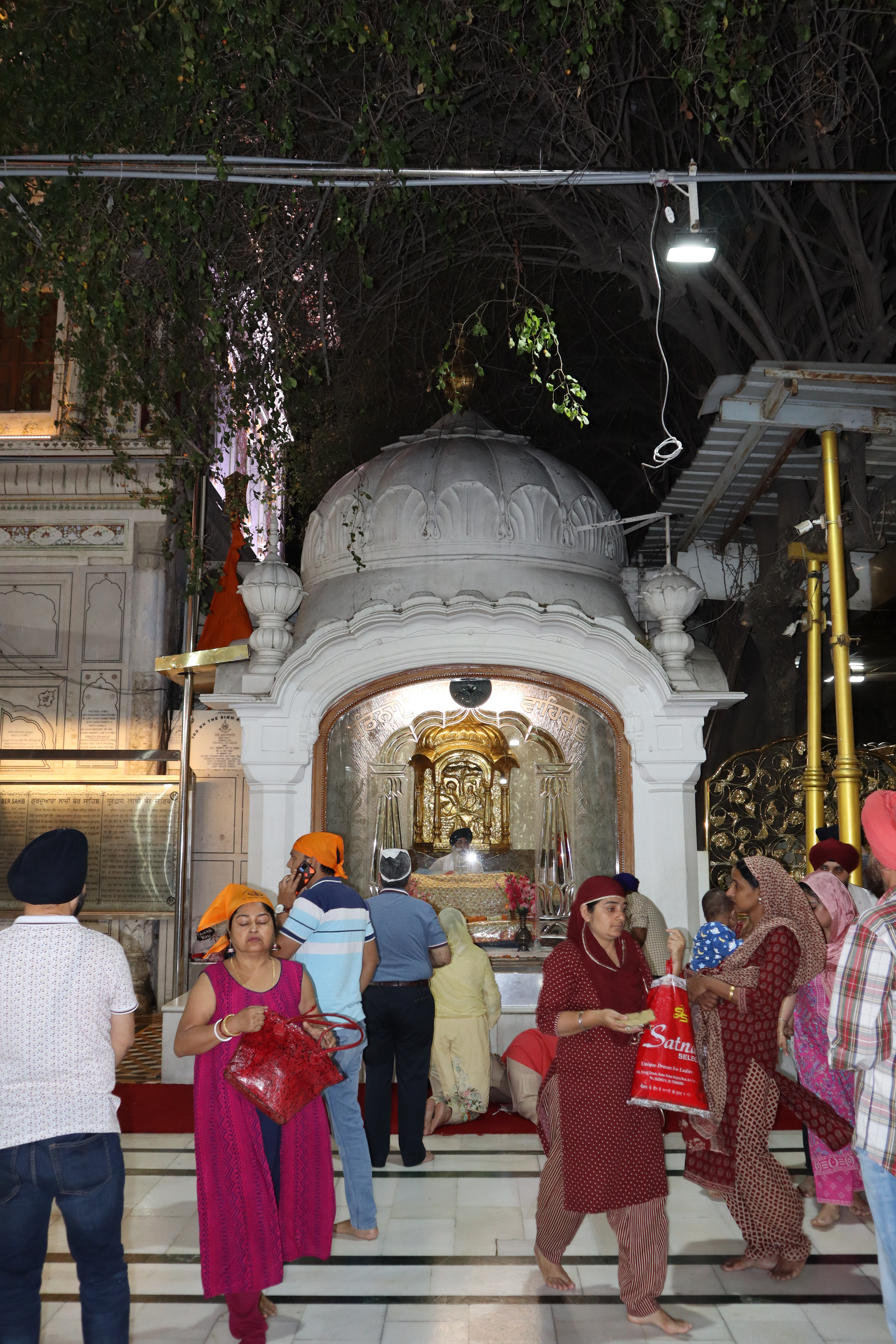
Photograph of Gurdwara Sri Lachi Ber Sahib in the Golden Temple complex, Amritsar, Punjab, India, April 2023

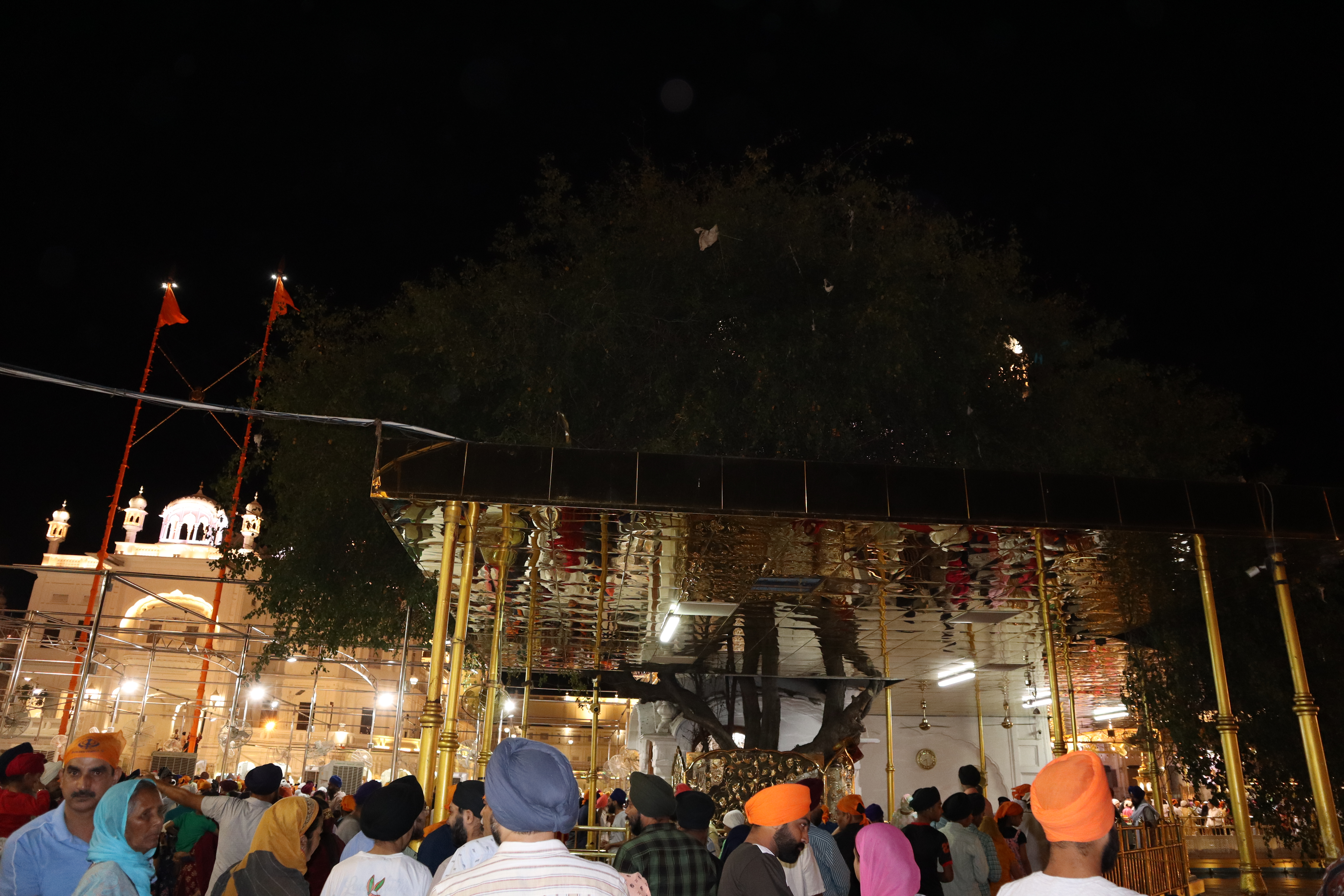
Photograph of the Lachhi Ber tree at-night within the Golden Temple complex, Amritsar, Punjab, India, April 2023

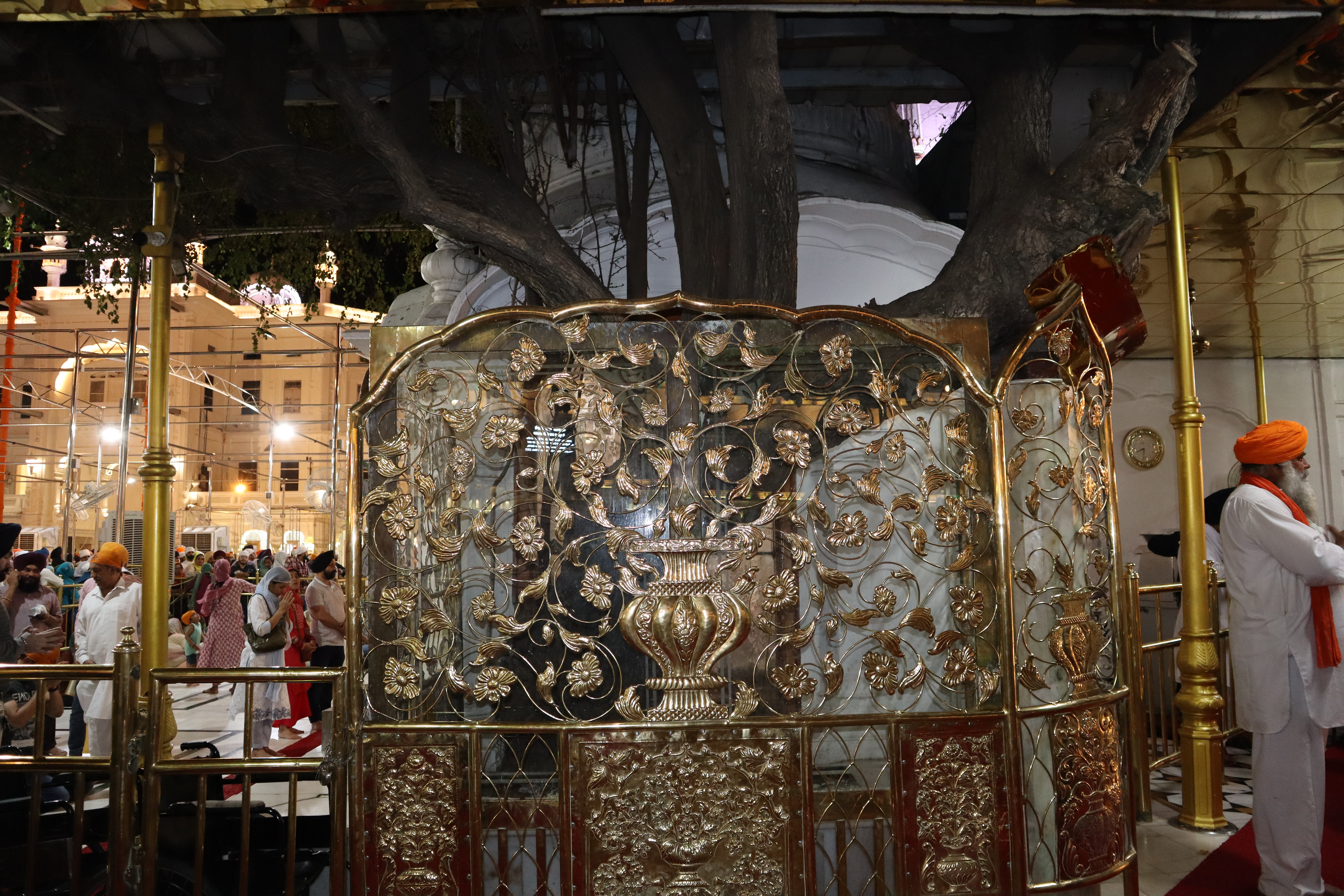
Photograph of the base-trunk and main-branches of the Lachhi Ber tree within the Golden Temple complex, Amritsar, Punjab, India, April 2023

=== Ber at Sultanpur Lodhi ===
A Ziziphus jujuba tree associated with Guru Nanak can be found at Gurdwara Ber Sahib in Sultanpur Lodhi. It is believed that Guru Nanak revealed the Mul Mantar near the tree. The tree is notable for bearing many fruit annually and having few spines.

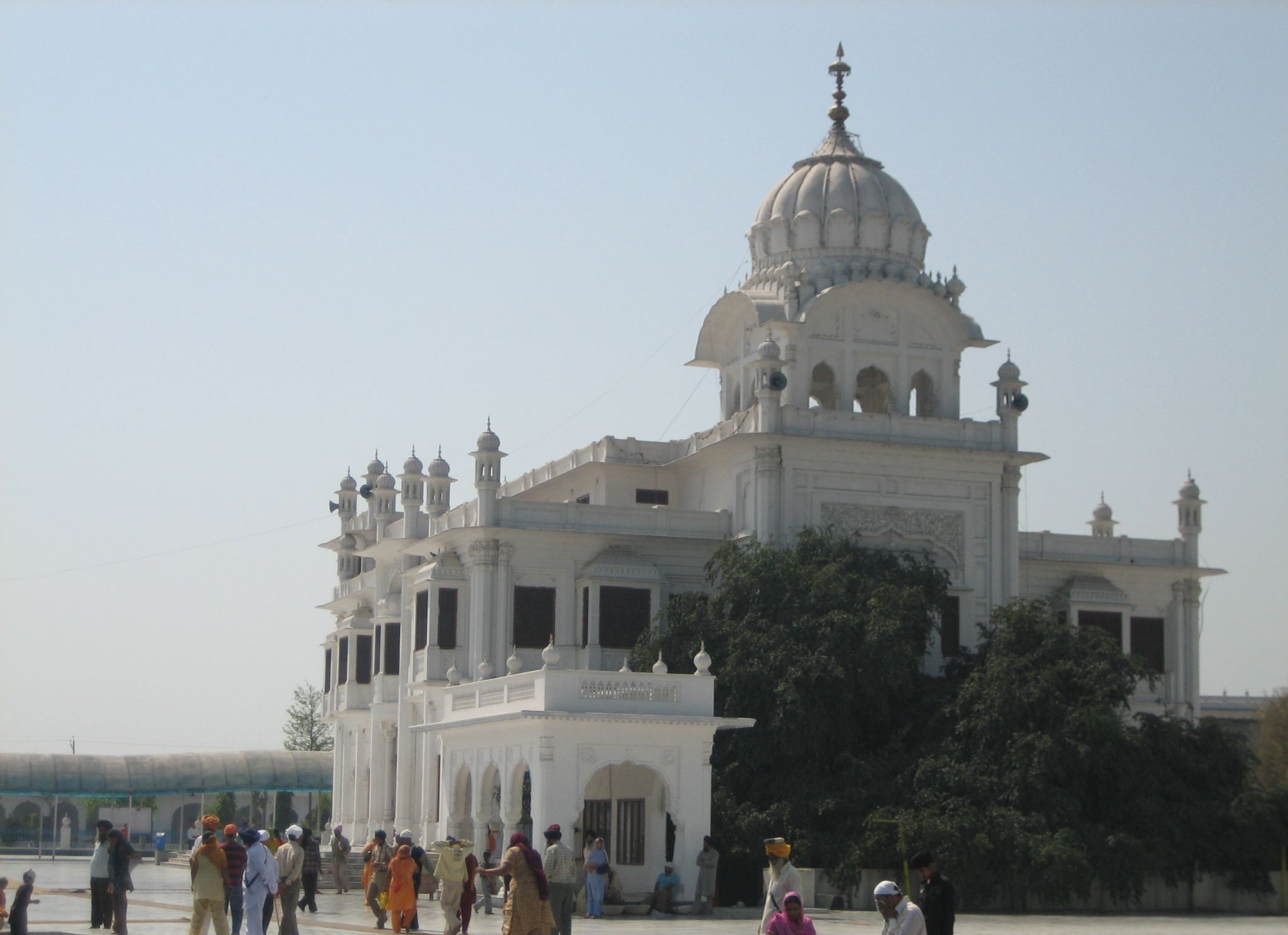
Gurdwara Ber Sahib, Sultanpur Lodhi, 2010

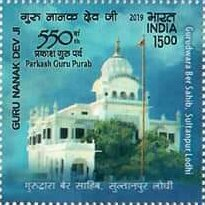
Gurdwara Ber Sahib, Sultanpur Lothi, Stamp of India, 2019

=== Beri at Siloani ===
A beri tree can be found at Siloani in Ludhiana which Guru Gobind Singh is believed to have tied his horse to whilst traveling in the Malwa region in the aftermath of the Battle of Chamkaur. At the location of the beri, Guru Gobind Singh, whilst disguised in Islamic garbs, met with Rai Kalha, the chief of Raikot, who then escorted the Guru to Raikot. The building (specifically known as a Manji Sahib) at this site was originally a small, domed room, which was transformed into a larger structure later-on. Three iron girdles have been installed to support the aging tree as well as stilts by the local gurdwara management committee.

=== Babe-Di-Ber at Sialkot ===
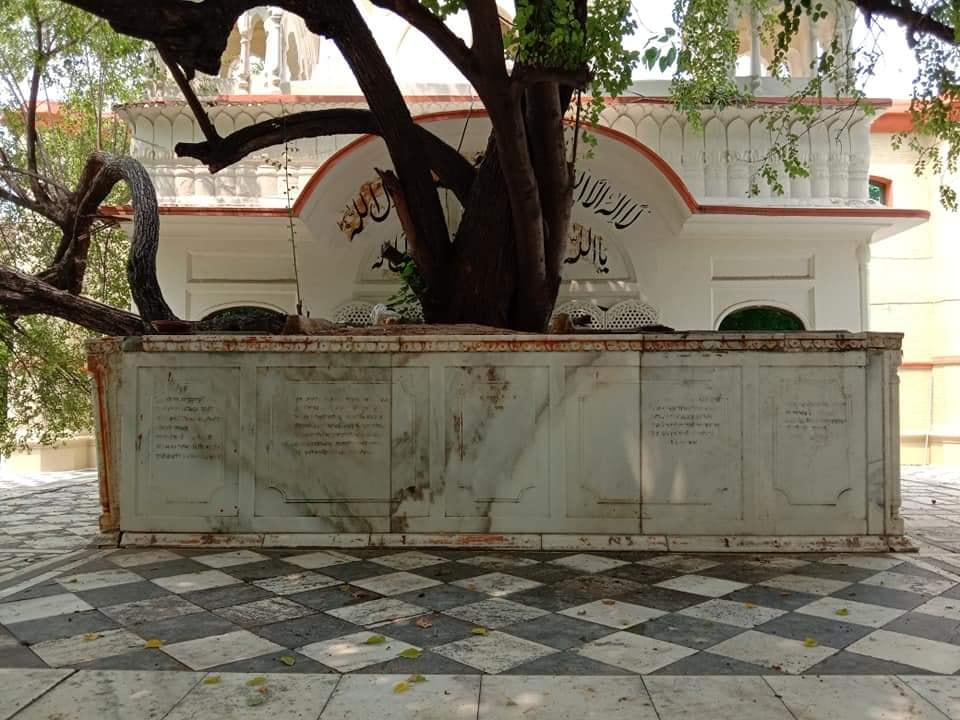
Sacred ber tree at Gurdwara Beri Sahib, Sialkot, Punjab, Pakistan

A Ziziphus jujuba tree can be found at Gurdwara Babe-Di-Ber Sahib in Sialkot, Pakistan. It is believed Guru Nanak had visited Sialkot multiple times during his life. As per lore, Guru Nanak is said to have visited the location of the tree on one of his visits to Sialkot when he was arriving via Saidpur from Talwandi (present-day Nankana Sahib). The tree was located in the south-east of the town of Sialkot at the time and Guru Nanak is believed to have taken rest under it. Later, a gurdwara was constructed at the site. The gurdwara was renovated and restored by the Evacuee Trust Property Board (ETPB) of Pakistan in 2014.

=== Garna Sahib at Bodal ===
A sacred, 350-year-old garna (Carissa) tree is located at Gurdwara Garna Sahib in Vill, Bodal village, Dasuya, in Hoshiarpur district. Sikhs believe Guru Hargobind took rest under this tree during a hunting trip. The fruits borne by this species of tree, berries of a dark-purple hue, are called garuna or garaunda in Punjabi, hence the name of the tree. In the past, the Hoshiapur area was once inhabited by many garna trees, and their fruits were consumed by pilgrims en route to the Naina Devi temple. The roots of garna trees have medicinal properties and can be used to treat worm-infested wounds of animals.

=== Nim Sahib at Akar ===
A sacred Nim tree (Azadirachta indica) that is over 300-years-old is located at Gurdwara Nim Sahib in Akar, Patiala. This tree is considered holy because whilst touring the Malwa region of Punjab, it is believed Guru Tegh Bahadur rested under the tree. It is believed that the Sikh guru touched one of the branches of the tree, which rendered the leaves of that particular branch tasteless forever after, whilst leaves sourced from the other branches of the tree still retain a bitter taste. This miracle is tied to a message in the Guru Granth Sahib, which claims that being in good company that is blessed by the Guru renders one bitterless. In 2006, this tree was suffering from a bark disease. The local gurdwara management committee was recommended removing granite flooring around the base of the tree and adding cow-dung plaster that is mixed with turmeric and copper sulfate, to restore the tree's health. The tree had made a recovery by 2016.

=== Pipli Sahib at Amritsar ===
A sacred peepal tree (Ficus religiosa) can be found at Gurdwara Pipli Sahib in Amritsar. (Note: 'Peepal' is alternatively spelled as 'Pipal'.) Sikhs believe that Guru Arjan welcomed Sikh adherents from Afghanistan and northwestern Punjab, who had arrived to assist with the excavation work to construct the temple tank of Harmandir Sahib, at the location of this tree. A unique characteristic of this particular tree is that its leaves located on the upper portion of the tree are golden-yellow in-colour. Peepal trees have long been considered spiritually significant in Indic religions, finding specific mention in the Guru Granth Sahib's verses. In India, this species of tree symbolizes the continuity of life due to its long lifespan.

=== Phalahi Sahib at Lakhisar ===
A phalahi tree (Acacia modesta), spanning a large area, can be found at Gurdwara Phalahi Sahib in Lakhisar, Bathinda district. This tree once was part of the historical Lakhi Jungle (now a locality). It is believed that Guru Gobind Singh passed through this location whilst travelling from Muktsar to Talwandi Sabo in the early part of 1706. A teeth-cleaning twig, known locally as a datun, made from phalahi, was left at the location, which grew up into four, large phalahi trees. Currently, two dry trunks are parallel to the earth whilst the other two trunks, which are also situated parallel to the ground, have exceeded forty feet in length and are still experiencing growth. These features have been described as being botanical rarities. The tree is not being maintained and is surviving without human help. Devotees place wooden pegs near the roots of the tree in the hopes of being blessed with a son or in hopes of obtaining more milk from their cows. Every month at the tree's location, a special gathering on the full moon happens.

=== Tahli at Munak Kalan ===
There exists a tahli tree at Munak Kalan under which it is believed Guru Hargobind rested. Furthermore, a well also dating to the period of the sixth Sikh guru can be found in its vicinity. In April 2006, the tree was in poor health and described as "dying & denuded of leaves". The reason for the tree's health decline has been attributed to salt offerings by pilgrims damaging its roots. Experts and the local gurdwara management worked together to restore the tree's health. By August 2019, the tree had made a recovery.

=== Beri Sahib at Mehraj ===
A large ber (Ziziphus mauritiana) tree called Beri Sahib is found near the Gurdwara Sri Shaheed Ganj in Mehraj, Punjab. It is believed that Guru Hargobind tied his horse here during the Battle of Gurusar in 1631 against the Mughals.

=== Neem tree at Gurdwara Baba Gurditta ===
A sacred neem tree associated with Baba Gurditta, son of Guru Hargobind, can be found at Gurdwara Baba Gurditta just to the south of Kiratpur. The neem tree supposedly sprouted from a neem twig that Baba Gurditta was holding when he died at the location.

=== Imli tree at the Akal Takht ===
There was an Imli (tamarind) tree in the square in-front of the Akal Takht in Amritsar, which was referenced in historical literature. The tree had been present during the establishment of the Akal Bunga in the early 17th century. Popular Sikh lore maintained that Maharaja Ranjit Singh was tied to the tree when he was punished by Akali Phula Singh for transgressing religious rules. Giani Gian Singh noted the tree in his work Tawarikh Amritsar (1889), stating that it was scented with rose water on special occasions. The tree was 20 to 25 feet tall and nearly 5 metres wide in canopy. The original tree was lost during the events of Operation Blue Star in 1984. An early attempt to plant a sapling at the original tree's former location in 2000 had failed when the new tree died during the winter of 2023, probably due to it being a domesticated-strain which had poor cold-tolerance. Another sapling from a more wild-variety of Imli has been planted at the site of the former tree in a second attempt to restore the spirit of the original tree.

== Conservation ==
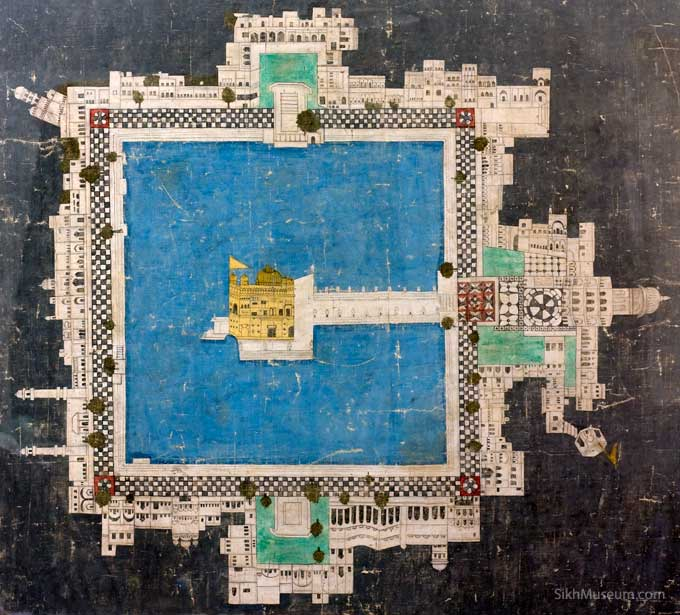
Overhead map of the Darbar Sahib (Golden Temple) and environs, ca. 19th century, paint on paper, Harry Mann Collection. As per this map, many more trees than the current three used to exist along the causeways of the complex.

According to Jagdeep Singh Faridkot, the area of Amritsar was originally full of vegetation during the period of the Sikh gurus. Historic trees associated with Sikh history are at risk due to neglectful and poorly made judgements without consulting botanical experts, such as strangling the roots and base with concrete and marble, covering the trees with fibre glass, and erecting steel beams around the trunks. Efforts are ongoing to revive and preserve the life of the Beri trees surrounding the Golden Temple.

In the late 1990's, the tips of the three prominent sacred jujube trees within the Golden Temple complex started drying. The branches of the trees were suffering from drying and an insect infection by Kerria lacca (lac insects). The cause of the declining health of the sacred jujube trees has been attributed to pilgrims offering prashad and touching the bark of the trees' trunk with greasy hands. Due to these factors, the passage of sap of the trees became clogged, resulting in drying of the tree, intensifying the insect infestation. In 1993, three measures were adopted to save the trees and restore their health:

1. Dead and dried branches were pruned from the trees in May as the tree specie is a summer deciduous.
2. The trees were treated with an insecticide spray to eliminate lac insects and other harmful insects.
3. Pilgrims were instructed to not leave prashad offerings near the base of the trees' trunk nor physically touch any part of the trees with oily hands to prevent harm being caused to the bark.

Due to the above efforts, with time the trees began to show improvement in their health, such as in-regards to their flowering and fruiting. Many treatment efforts, such as pruning, are still being continued to help the trees. In 2015, the ber trees of the Golden Temple complex began to produce fruit again after a gap for years due to their improved health. Furthermore, their inner canopies saw improved growth.

A team from Punjab Agricultural University (PAU) consisting of four scientists, namely Jaswinder Singh Brar, Sandeep Singh, Karan Bir Singh Gill, and Narinderpal Singh, conducted preservation work of the ber trees in 2022 at the Golden Temple complex. They removed dried and dead branches on an annual basis every May when the trees are dormant in-order to rejuvenate them.

=== Museum of Trees ===
Damanbir Singh Jaspal of the Chandigarh Nature and Health Society has established a museum of trees on his personal property in Chandigarh for preserving the tree species represented amongst the sacred trees of Sikhism. It contains clones of prominent sacred trees, such as the Dukh Bhanjani Ber, within it. It also contains sacred trees from other religions, such as a tree sourced from Sri Lanka believed to be a descendant of the tree the Buddha obtained enlightenment under. The museum also contains a garden containing medicinal plants.
