= Mahima Prakash Vartak =

1741 Sikh text by Bawa Kirpal Das Bhalla

Mahima Prakash Vartak, originally titled just Mahima Prakash ("light of glory"), also spelt Mehma Parkash, is an episodic Sikh text that documents the lives of the ten Sikh gurus, covering historical events, didacticism, and scriptural interpretation. The work was originally authored in 1741 at Khadur by Bawa Kirpal Das Bhalla, also known as Kirpal Singh Bhalla.

It is believed to be the earliest work to cover all the ten Sikh gurus, with 164 sakhis (stories) in total. The work is written in prose (vartak) rather than in verse. Although similar to them, the work is not classified as part of the Gurbilas genre. The work has the word vartak, meaning "prose" appended to its name to differentiate it from a work with the same name written in verse (kavita). Both Mahima Prakash works were authored by the Bhalla tradition, whom were descendants of the Sikh gurus, specifically Guru Amar Das.

None of the extant manuscripts of the work state its date of completion or original author, however it is commonly accepted as being written by Bawa Kirpal Das Bhalla in 1741. Whilst dated to 1741, Kulwinder Singh Bajwa dates the work from anywhere between 1741 and 1773. The work borrows heavily from the Janamsakhi tradition for its tellings on Guru Nanak, specifically the Puratan sub-tradition. It borrows from the Miharvan sub-tradition of the Janamsakhis for its interpretation of gurbani.

The work was re-discovered by Akali Kaur Singh. Manuscript copies of the work is held by Khalsa College in Amritsar, the Languages Department in Patiala, and the Bhai Vir Singh Collection at Dehradun. In 2004, Kulwinder Singh Bajwa created an annotated edition of the work, including an introduction. The work would go-on to influence other texts, such as the Parchian (1741) by Seva Das Udasi and Mahima Prakash Kavita (1776) by Sarup Das Bhalla.

The sakhis in the text by which guru they are about is as follows:

- Guru Nanak: twenty
- Guru Angad: ten
- Guru Amar Das: twenty-seven
- Guru Ram Das: seven
- Guru Arjan: fifteen
- Guru Hargobind: twenty
- Guru Har Rai: seventeen
- Guru Har Krishan: one
- Guru Tegh Bahadur: four
- Guru Gobind Singh: forty-three
