= Sakhi =

Sikh historical accounts

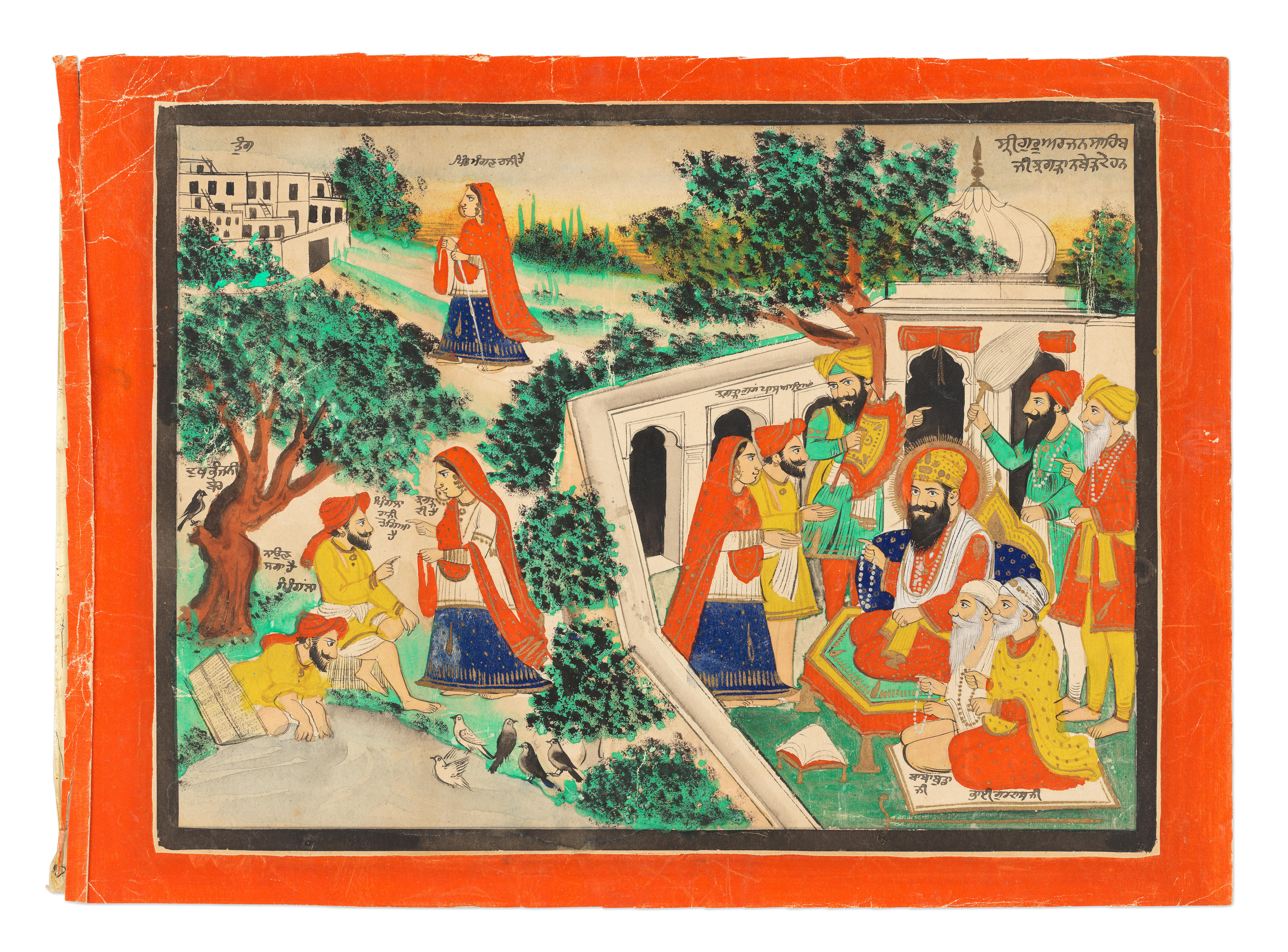
Painting depicting Guru Ram Das and the story of Dukh Bhanjani - the leper husband of Bibi Rajani was cured by taking a dip in the pond. Attributed to Gian Singh Naqqash. Opaque watercolour on paper, Amritsar, early 20th century

Sakhi (Gurmukhi: ਸਾਖੀ; sākhī) literally means 'historical account', 'anecdote', or 'story'. It is derived from the Sanskrit word sākṣī (साक्षी) which literally means 'witness'. The term finds prominent usage amongst the Sikhs, however it is also used by the Kabirpanthis, Dadupanthis, and Niranjanis.

The term refers to the accounts of the historical events in Sikhism. It is a tale usually from the era during the times of the Sikh Gurus and their devoted followers and associates. However, many Sakhis do exist from the period before and after the times of the ten gurus. Most Sakhis have a moral lesson and highlight important Sikh principles.

== History ==
The sakhi finds usage amongst nirgun bhakti sant traditions of northwestern India, especially traditions whose scriptures consist of the vānī scriptural tradition.

According to Harbhajan Singh, the janamsakhi and sakhi tradition was associated with the Gurmat literary tradition, the goshti tradition is associated with the Minas, and the parchai tradition is linked to the Sewapanthis, with there being similarities between all four types of works. The janamsakhis and sakhis are some of the earliest surviving examples of Punjabi prose but evidence hints that prose writing had developed earlier. It is probable that the development of the genre was influenced by both the Sufi tradition of malfuzat, aqwal, or bachans, and the Buddhist tradition of jataka. The earliest surviving prose Punjabi work may be either the Ekadashi Mahatam or the Puratan Janamsakhi (which was written in 1635 or earlier). The later janamsakhis, sakhis, and goshtis came after it. Prior to the sakhis being authored involving the Sikh gurus, there were biographical, narrative works from North India covering other mediaeval saints, like Kabir, these works belonged to the varta, vār, and mala literary traditions. These works covered the lives of sants and bhaktas that belonged to the same religious tradition or sect as the author. Examples include the Chaurasi Vaishnavan di Varta (covering Vallabhachari's disciples) by Gokul Nath (1551–1674), the Do Sau Bavan Vaishnava di Varta (covering Vithal Nath's disciples), and the Bhagatmal (1592, covering bhaktas of the Ramamnandis, originally written by Nabhadas, with a Punjabi version of the work being composed in 1777 by Narayan Das). There was a hagiographical literary tradition, known as parcaī, with some known works of this genre being the one on Nāmdev by Ānantadās in 1588, the Kabīr parcaī on Kabir, and the Dādū Janma Līlā by Jangopāl on Dadu Dayal. As per the early 19th century text Shahīd Bilās, when Guru Gobind Singh travelled southward to the Deccan in the early 18th century, Mani Singh composed stories (sākhīān) to lift the spirits of the Sikhs in the north who were sad about the guru's departure.

In a comparable manner, the Sikh literature focuses on the Sikh gurus, such as the Vāran by Gurdas, goshtis by Miharvan, the janamsakhis, and the sakhis. Whilst the sakhi genre arose amongst the Gurmat Sikh tradition, different sects adopted the tradition and used their own terminology for it to establish a more distinct identity, sometimes also adding other elements to create further distinctiveness. The Sewapanthi sect, whom were sehajdharis, were able to produce their parchai literature covering the bhagats (whose works are found in the Guru Granth Sahib), the mahatmas of their sects, and Sikh gurus, as they did not have an outward Khalsa Sikh appearance so they were spared from the same extent of anti-Sikh persecution that Khalsa Sikhs faced from the Mughals. The parchais were written in Braj-Sadhukari verse or Punjabi prose, with two notable authors being Suhajram and Sewa Das. Bhai Mani Singh was tied to the sakhi tradition and produced some works. Meanwhile, the Minas developed the goshtis, differed from the sakhis of the Gurmat tradition (which they were opposed to) by being more of a dialogue rather than narrative, with the question-and-answer format being utilized in the goshtis. Rather than merely citing and quoting the gurbani authored by Guru Nanak as the sakhis do, the Mina goshtis include expositions on them, which is known as parmarath, making the Mina goshtis more philosophical than the more narrative-based sakhis of the Gurmat tradition.

== List of sakhi works and compilations ==
List of prominent sakhi works and the number of sakhis found in them is as follows:

- Janamsakhis – various traditions focused on Guru Nanak
- Gurbilases – various traditions focused on Guru Hargobind and Guru Gobind Singh
- Sakhi Guru Amar Das Ki Mahalla 3 – the text of this sakhi was published in Sri Satguru Ji Ke Muhain Dian Sakhian by Narinder Kaur Bhatia in 1978. Related to Guru Amar Das.
- Sakhi Mahalla 5 – rediscovered by G. B. Singh in a Guru Granth Sahib manuscript found in Banigram, Eastern Bengal. It has been discovered in other historical Guru Granth Sahib manuscripts. Related to Guru Arjan.
- Guru ke Munh dian Sakhian – text authored by Rup Kaur covering the guruship of her father, Guru Har Rai.
- Parchian Satigura Dian (50)
- Mahima Prakash Vartak (164)
- Mahima Prakash Kavita (237)
- Guru Kian Sakhian (112)
- Suraj Prakash
- Panj Sau Sakhi/Sau Sakhi (500/100) – A collection of over five-hundred anecdotes from Sikh history was said to have been compiled in a work known as the Panj Sau Sakhi, which is now lost. An extant work titled Sau Sakhi contains a hundred anecdotes.

== See also ==
- Bhat Vahis
