= Datun Sahib =

Tree in Leh, Ladakh, India

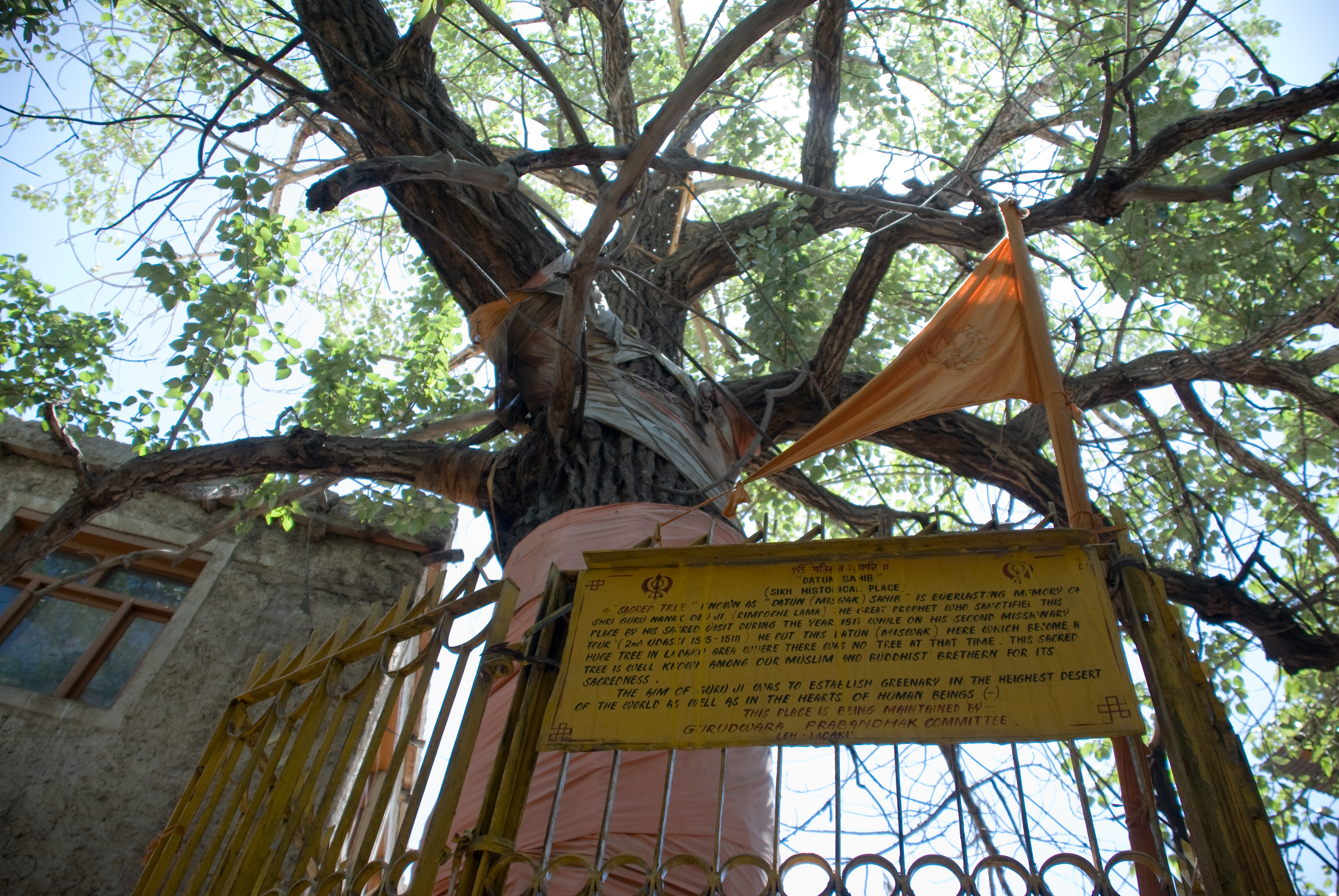
- The tree in 2009
- Location: Leh, Ladakh, India
- Date seeded: 1516

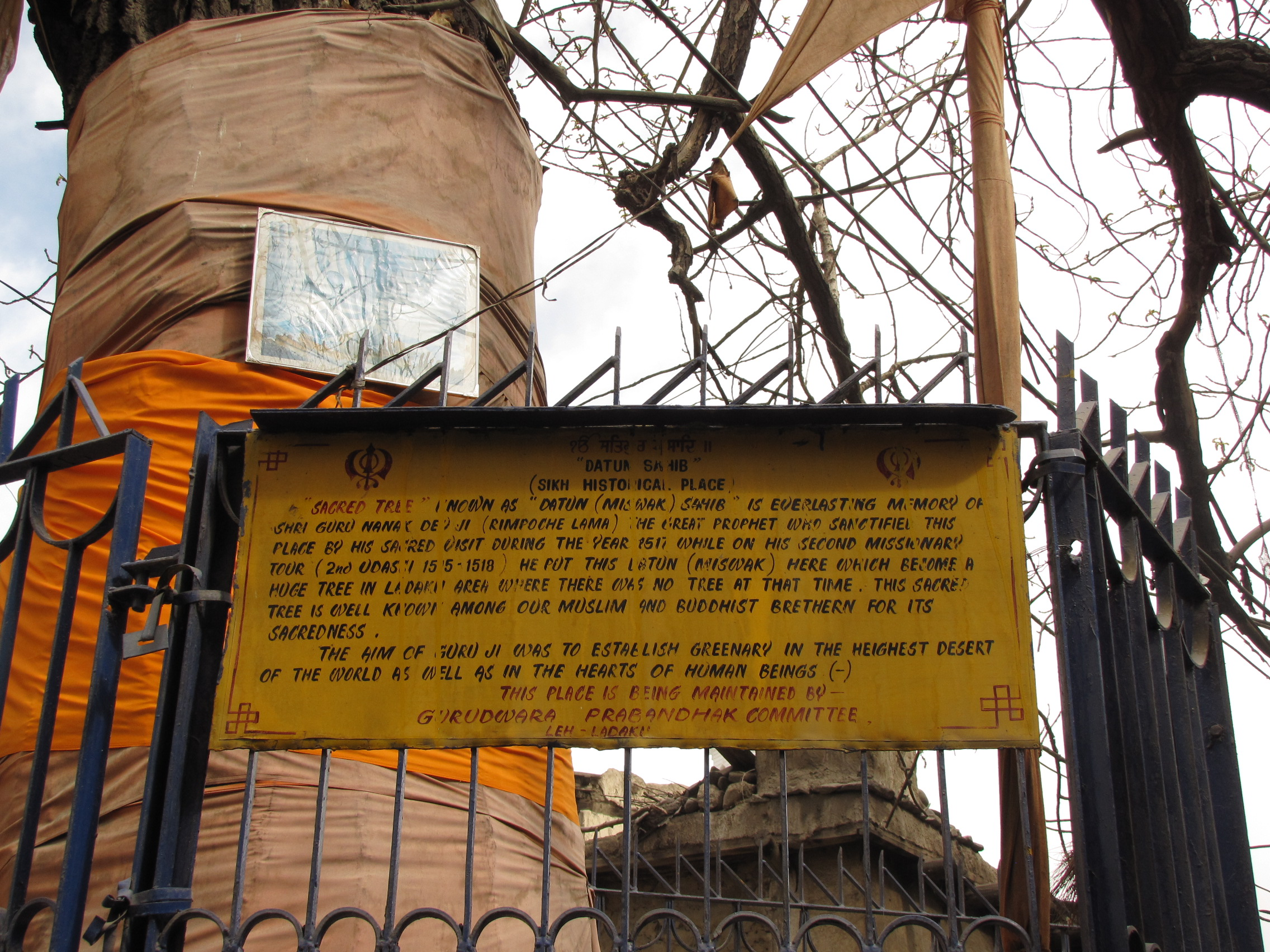
Sign near the tree

Datun Sahib is the name of a tree in the main bazaar at Leh, Ladakh, India. Guru Nanak visited this site around 1516. There is no Gurudwara at the site, but the remains of a large meswak tree are located behind the Jamia Masjid in the main bazaar at Leh. The Datun Sahib is located close to the Leh Palace, on a lane which mainly houses bread makers.

Datun Sahib contains a nishan sahib and a tree wrapped with orange cloth. A yellow board in front of the tree refers to the visit of "Rimpoche Nanak" (Holy Nanak) around 1516. Guru Nanak was revered by both Buddhists and Muslims. It is said that Leh was devoid of greenery at the time, but Nanak blessed the city with greenery by planting a meswak tree. There are two main Singh Sabha Gurudwaras located within one kilometre of the site.

== See also ==
- Sacred trees in Sikhism
