= Koer Singh Kalal =

18th-century Sikh scholar

Bhai Koer Singh Kalal
- Born: Bishan Singh or Bishan Chand early 18th century
- Occupation: Religious Scholar
- Writing career
- Period: 18th century
- Subject: Guru Gobind Singh Khalsa Sikh history
- Notable work: Gurbilas Patshahi 10

Bhai Koer Singh or Kuir Singh was an 18th-century Sikh scholar who is best known for authoring Gurbilas Patshahi Das. It provides a detailed account surrounding the life of Tenth Sikh Guru, Guru Gobind Singh and the origins of the Khalsa. It is regarded as the first reliable and comprehensive source as he was also a close companion of Bhai Mani Singh.

== Early life ==
Born as Bishan Singh or Bishan Chand into a Kalal family. He identified himself as a resident of a Kamboa neighborhood. Initially, he is known as a firm follower of Vaishnavism. Later, he embraced Sikhism and became a devout follower of Guru Gobind Singh.

Subsequently, he adopted the name Koer Singh Kalal, possibly to identify with Jassa Singh Ahluwalia (Kalal), the supreme Sikh leader of the Dal Khalsa. After losing his job, he became a close aide of Bhai Mani Singh and spent time in his company. During this time, Bhai Mani Singh narrated stories about Guru's life to him.

== Works ==
Bhai Koer Singh is credited with writing one of the earliest works on the life of Tenth Sikh Guru, Guru Gobind Singh. His work, also known as Gurbilas Patshahi Dasvin or Gurbilas Patshahi 10, was completed in 1751. It contains stories directly narrated by Bhai Mani Singh. Thus, Gurbilas Patshahi Das is considered as a reliable historical source.

Known for being the first fully comprehensive historical source narrating the life of Guru Gobind Singh, it became an original source for other literature works.

His work details about the creation of the Khalsa, battles, events surrounding the life and martyrdom of Guru Gobind Singh. As a devout follower, Bhai Koer Singh Kalal depicted Guru Gobind Singh's as both a spiritual leader and a brave emperor. The text also contains several of the verses paraphrased from Gursobha as well as other prominent and earliest written texts on the life of Guru Gobind Singh.

== Notable mentions ==
The book verifies that Guru Gobind Singh was the composer of works like Bachitar Natak, Jaap Sahib, and Hikayats. It also confirms that Hikaaitaan was embedded at end of Zafarnama being written by Guru Gobind Singh. Other works that are verified by their mention includes Chobis Avtar, Chandi da Var and Akal Ustat at Paonta etc.

He also noted passing of spiritual succession to Sri Guru Granth Sahib by Guru Gobind Singh. There are a total of 2938 chhands of which 2901 are written in Braj language and the rest 37 are written in Punjabi language. He is said to have access to Guru Gobind Singh's Bachitra Natak and Sainapat's Sri Gur Sabha. He mentioned creation of Khalsa happened in the year of 1689 which is different from other sources.

One of the notable features is the detailed mention of martyrdom of Bhai Mani Singh. Therefore, it is assumed that he must have been an eyewitness to know about the event in detail including names of other Sikhs martyred. No other contemporary source mentions this information.

== Notes ==
1. Alternatively, Koer Singh Kalal can also be written as Kuir Singh Kalal or Koyar Singh Kalal.
2. 10th Sikh Guru Guru Gobind Singh's detailed description of early Life, war time and other events are mentioned in detail unlike any other sources. Some historians attributes it to the facts that he was a close companion of Bhai Mani Singh.
3. Bhai Mani Singh was himself a close childhood companion of Guru Gobind Singh Ji. Since he personally narrated about it to Bhai Koer Singh, thus, it became the first comprehensive written work on the life of Tenth Sikh Guru Gobind Singh.
