= Sau Sakhi =

Historical text of Sikhism

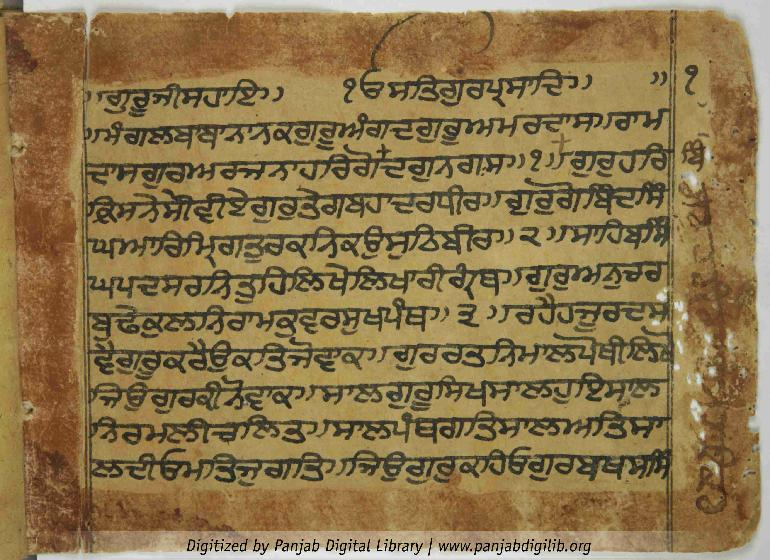
Opening folio of a Sau Sakhi manuscript

Sau Sakhi (lit. Hundred Anecdotes), also known as Guru Ratan Mal, is a collection of a hundred sakhis (stories) traditionally attributed to Bhai Ram Kanwar, a descendant of Baba Buddha who had dictated it to scribe Sahib Singh, and otherwise by Gurbux Singh Raindar, though some believe it was written by Guru Gobind Singh as well, though unfounded. Sau Sakhi has multiple perspectives, with its authenticity being debated. There are different versions of the text in circulation. The text covers the life of Guru Gobind Singh, religious tenets, code of conduct, and political events, with many prophetic and esoteric elements. However, the text also contains anachronisms, misstatements, interpolations, and biases that have been inserted into the work by different editors over time, so it has to be approached carefully by researchers. The text is held high in regard by the Namdharis due to its prophecy of Ram Singh and the Sant Khalsa.

== Authorship ==
The original author of the work is unclear and there are different theories. It has been claimed to have been written by Guru Gobind Singh himself, however Pratibha Chawla finds this unlikely as the work does not match the guru's style or ethos. According to Chawla, it is probable that the work was originally written by Sahib Singh, based upon the works of Ram Singh Koer. Sir Attar Singh of Bhadaur wrote that it was written by Gurbux Singh Raindar and presented to one of the Cis-Sutlej sardars.

== History ==
The text was originally titled Panj Sau Sakhi (lit. Five Hundred Anecdotes), but was later divided into five parts with each part being known as Sau Sakhi. The existence of a text called Panj Sau Sakhi was unknown until a manuscript was discovered in 1815 at Thanesar and presented to Amar Singh Singhpuria. The text, a combination of Hindi for prose and Punjabi for verse, was written in c. 1724 – c. 1734. Some parts of the original Sau Sakhi have been lost; the text has been interpolated and corrupted. However, later interpolations were easily decipherable. One version of the text prophesied the rule of the Sikh Empire over the Indian subcontinent about a year after this version was revealed; the Sikh Empire was defeated by the East India Company in the Second Anglo-Sikh War, and the empire ceased to exist. Later versions prophesied an invasion from the Russian Empire, leading to the downfall of the British. Another version prophesizes that Ram Singh Kuka will conquer all of the Punjab and establish Namdhari rule. Sir Attar Singh of Bhadaur translated the book to English in 1873 and published it in Varanasi. Several versions were published after 1890 in Punjabi, with almost all of them contradicting each other. The text is likely the first Sikh work to criticize the British diplomacy. The Sikhs were the main component of the British army, which assaulted Delhi, which was a popular prophecy in all versions of the Sau Sakhi, and was even mentioned in a travellers book during the Misl era.

== Content ==
The original book was written in Braj Bhasha, and was translated by Sir Attar Singh of Bhadaur, this was the original Sau Sakhi that was published, it was noted that Gurbux Singh Raindar was the author, Gurbux Singh often gives the desciprions of who told him the story as well, for example Sakhi Sixteen was an oral account by Sujan Singh of Lahore, whose son Baisakha Singh still knew the story at the time of writing the book. There are very little dates given for prophecies so one cannot establish the exact timeline of mythological prophecies, though many prophecies do share correlations with the past.

The book starts with an invocation, or Manglacharan, and then goes onto describe how the Sikh Gurus worked, their campaigns of conversion, their beliefs on Vedas and Shastras and more. It contains many accounts of stories of Guru Gobind Singh (and refers to him in the third person), and also accounts of battles and wars between Sikhs, the Hill Rajas, and the Mughals. It also talks of Banda Singh Bahadur's campaign, but mistakenly states that Banda Singh's military campaign and Guru Gobind Singh's life in Nanded were at the same time, which was also popular belief in the 1800s. It also states that Banda was killed by Sikhs in Sindh, rather than the reality of his execution in Delhi.

It includes a description of the Battle of Plassey, wherein the description states that there would be battle in Bengal between the "Pherungees" (Englishmen) and the Muslims. The description included one of a Muslim ruler named Bundan whose dynasty would rule for 1000 years, and the English would flood the country, which is when the Sikhs would help the English in conquering Delhi. The date is very close to the real date, Gurbux Singh said 1860 when the real battle happened during the Revolt of 1857. It also provides a description of a Hindu devotee of the Gurus who would lead the Sikhs in battle in West Punjab- named Moola, which many correlate to Diwan Mulraj. Ranjit Singh was also mentioned, in a prophecy stating that a Muslim prostitute would be married to him (his name was noted to be Ran Singh, Bhadaur concluded it meant Ranjit Singh).

After the battle in Delhi, Duleep Singh (possibly the Sikh price Duleep Singh) and his aide Teja Singh would come to power and rule over territory between Khadoor Sahib and the ocean. The Sikhs would congregate under Duleep Singh at Damdama Sahib, and the Sikhs would hold counsel with the English, Muslims and Hindus. The Sikhs would conquer the English, and the English would conquer the Muslims, but not leave the country, the Nepalese would become Kings as well and rule over large masses of India. Duleep Singh would conquer Kashmir, there would be Dogras opposing them (Hira Singh Dogra was specifically mentioned), and it was noted that Hira Singh would be seen with mistrust, which is what happened. Alam Singh would also rise as a King after Duleep Singh, and Uday Singh too (possibly Uday Singh of Kaithal), along with them a Sikh named Ram Singh (noted to be Ram Singh Kuka), would conquer areas by force, including Kabul, and then shortly after conquering Delhi, would die, and another (a Rajput, noted to be named Dip Singh), would be driven out from Kangra and die on the banks of the Ganges. Jammu, Kandahar, Persia, Bengal and more would be conquered, and all regions travelled by Guru Nanak would be under Sikh rule. Another description is of a man named Fateh Singh, a born from a Zamindar, who would lead the Sikhs and would finally expel the English from India. Later descriptions include a Sikh born in Sambhal, who would be proclaimed the Kalki Avatar, who would marry a woman named Trikota.
