= Gurbilases =

Sikh literary genre

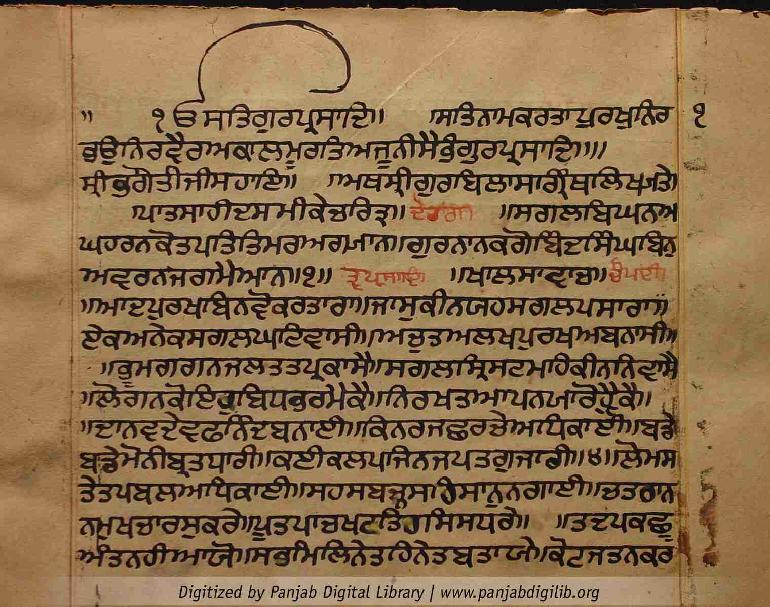
- Folio of a Gurbilas Patshahi Dasvin manuscript

Information
- Religion: Sikhism
- Author: Various
- Period: 18th century

The Gurbilas literature, or Gurbilases, refers to a genre of Sikh chronicle literature that records the biographies and historical narrations of the sixth and tenth Sikh gurus, namely Guru Hargobind and Guru Gobind Singh. They are similar to the Janamsakhi literature that contains biographies on the life of Guru Nanak. All of the main Gurbilas texts are traditionally attributed to the 18th century but their dates of completion are contested by scholars, who date them variously.

Kripal Das Bhalla's Mahima Prakash Vartak (prose) and Sarup Das Bhalla's versified Mahima Prakash also details the life of the tenth guru but are not classified as Gurbilases.

== Origin ==
The Gurbilases genre arose from the Vilāsa literary tradition, which are narration of kings, especially Rajput ones. Examples of Vilasa literature includes the Rājvilāsa related to Raja Raj Singh of Mewar (r. 1652–1680) which was written in the late 17th century. William Hewat McLeod states the genesis of the genre lies in the Bachittar Natak of the Dasam Granth. As per McLeod, the works pre-date the commencement of the Tat Khalsa.

== Gurbilas texts ==
=== Main works ===
==== Sri Gur Sobha ====
This text was completed by the court poet Sainapati in 1711. The title of the text translates to "radiance of the guru". It was the first text of the Gurbilas genre and it narrates the life of Guru Gobind Singh and the establishment of the Khalsa order. Sainapati was a patron poet of the Sikh guru.

==== Gurbilas Chhevin Patshahi ====
Folio of a manuscript of Gurbilas Chhevin Patshahi bearing the colophon date of 1775 B.S. (ca.1718 C.E.)

This text was completed in 1718 and is usually attributed to a poet named Sohan. (Note: The title is alternatively spelt as 'Gurbilas Patshahi Chevin'.) It covers the life of the sixth Sikh guru, Hargobind. Its authorship is associated with the Gianian Bunga of Amritsar, associated with Bhai Mani Singh. The work inserts Mani Singh into the dialogues presented within the text. The work is the only comprehensive account of the guruship of the sixth Sikh guru. It is dated as early as 1718, or to 1780, or even as late as 1843. Bhai Khan Singh Nabha points out the text mentioning events relating to Maharaja Ranjit Singh and covering of 19th century issues such as Ragmala as evidence for 1843 date. Scholarship tends to date the work to either the 19th century or earlier while acknowledging that many edits have been done to the text to explain the mentioning of later events. According to Jvala Singh, Gurbilas Patshahi Chhevi was narrated by Mani Singh and written down by Bhagat Singh. In early editions of the text, there is a reference to Guru Hargobind consuming cannabis, but this reference was removed in later editions.

==== Gurbilas Patshahi Dasvin ====
It was authored by Koer Singh Kalal in 1751. (Note: To be confused with the Gurbilas Dasvin Patshahi completed by Sukha Singh in 1797. Koer Singh's name is alternatively spelt as 'Kuir Singh'. The title of the text is alternatively spelt as 'Gurbilas Patshahi Dasvi'.) It has been claimed it was an early 19th century composition but as per Karamjit K. Malhotra these claims have been refuted. The work narrates the life of Guru Gobind Singh. Koer Singh claims the stories told in the work were narrated by Bhai Mani Singh. It was the first fully comprehensive work covering the life of Guru Gobind Singh.

==== Bansavalinama Dasan Patshahian Ka ====
Authored by Kesar Singh Chibbar in 1769.

==== Gurbilas Dasvin Patshahi ====
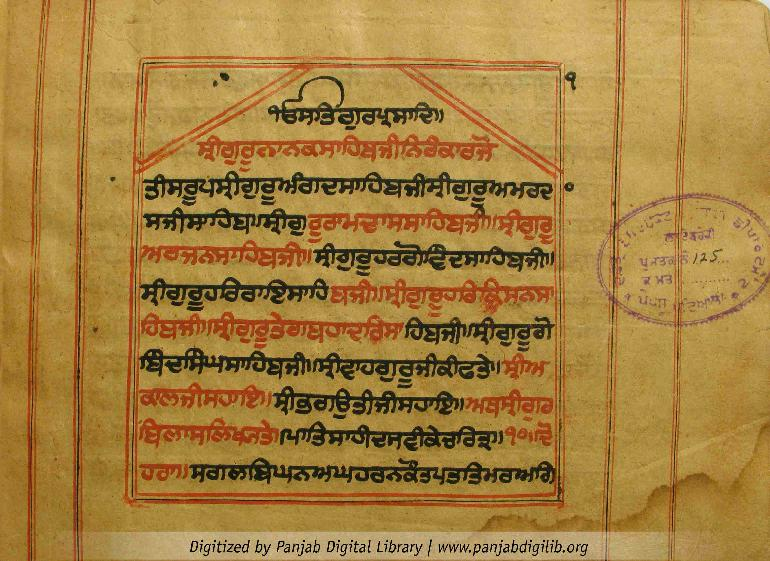
Folio of a Gurbilas Patshahi Dasvin manuscript (Sukha Singh's version), dated to 1836 C.E. (1893 Bk.)

Authored by Sukha Singh in 1797. (Note: Not to be confused with the Gurbilas Patshahi Dasvin authored by Koer Singh in 1751.)

=== Other texts ===
Sobhi Ram wrote a Gurbilas, known as Gurbilas Sahib Singh Bedi, not on a Sikh guru but rather on one of their descendants, namely Sahib Singh Bedi.

== Content and language ==
The Gurbilases genre falls into a category of works produced by local hagiographers in the Punjabi-language. The Gurbilas literature are written in verse rather than prose. The Gurbilases differ from other hagiographical texts documenting the lives of the Sikh gurus as they are fuller accounts rather than anecdotal accounts, unlike the Janamsakhis. The Gurbilases are connected biographies written in verse form. Similar to the earlier Janamsakhi tradition, the Gurbilases are panegyrical rather than analytical. However, the Gurbilases differ from the Janamsakhis as they stressed upon the destiny of the gurus to fight against evil and their courage in this battle, with the enemy being the Mughal Empire. Some of the Gurbilases place importance on devi (Indic goddesses) for the preparation of the Khalsa order.

== Historicity ==
The Gurbilas literature are classified as semi-historical texts. They cannot be considered true historiographical works, as they mix fact with fiction without any attempts at discerning the two from one another.

The Gurbilases were succeeded by more historical Sikh works, such as Rattan Singh Bhangu's Prachin Panth Prakash (1841) and Sohan Lal Suri's Umdat-ut-Twarikh (barring its first-part which is based on traditional accounts). However, the Suraj Prakash (1841) by Kavi Santokh Singh and Giani Gian Singh's Naveen Panth Prakash in verse (1880) and his Twarikh Guru Khalsa, are examples of later Sikh works that show signs of reversion to the Janamsakhi-Gubilases genres as they contain considerable doctrinal content and anecdotal material. The first Sikh author to fully apply the modern scientific method for the basis of historiographical research was Karam Singh.
