= List of battles of Guru Hargobind =

This is a list of battles fought by the 6th Sikh Guru, Guru Hargobind.

== Background ==
Guru Arjan had advised his son, Hargobind, to become martially trained when he was a youth. Following Guru Arjan's execution by Jahangir, the Mughal emperor, the Akal Sena came into being at the same time of the consecration of the Akal Bunga on the 15 June 1606. The Akal Sena became the army of the Sikhs and was headquartered in Amritsar. Guru Hargobind's army quickly grew in number and Sikhs began to call Guru Hargobind, "true king". A fort was created outside of Amritsar and Guru Hargobind had set up his own court in the Akal Takht. Guru Hargobind was eventually summoned to Delhi where he went hunting with Jahangir. Both of them grew close and went to Agra together. In 1609 he was imprisoned in Gawalior Fort by the emperor for reasons that are disputed. Guru Hargobind was eventually let go and had 52 Rajput Kings let go with him. Following his release Guru Hargobind maintained friendly relations with Jahangur while further strengthening the Akal Sena.

== Battles ==
Battle	Year	Strength		Casualties		Combatants		Result
Battle	Year	Sikhs	Enemy	Sikhs	Enemy	Sikhs	Enemy	Result
Battle of Rohilla	1621	500-700	4,000 - 15,000	Unknown	14,000	Akal Sena	Mughal Empire	Sikh Victory
Battle of Amritsar	1634	700	7,000	Unknown	7,000	Akal Sena	Mughal Empire	Sikh Victory
Battle of Lahira	1634	3,000 Sikh 1,000 Kangra	35,100+	1,200 Sikh 500 Kangra soldiers	35,100	Akal Sena; Kangra State	Mughal Empire	Sikh and Kangra Victory
Battle of Kartarpur	1635	1,800	52,000-100,000	700-1,000	50,000-96,000	Akal Sena	Mughal Empire	Sikh victory
Battle of Phagwara	1635	Unknown	Unknown	Unknown	Unknown	Akal Sena	Mughal Empire	Sikh Victory
Battle of Kiratpur	1638	23 (during the siege - later reinforced with larger army)	Unknown	Unknown	High	Akal Sena	Rulers of Ropar Pathans of Ropar Gujjars of Nangal Gujjaran Ranghars of Malakpur	Sikh Victory
