= Brahman Majra =

- Village
- Location in Punjab, India Brahman Majra (India)
- Coordinates: 30.8408555°N 75.8561755°E
- Country: India
- State: Punjab
- District: Ludhiana
- Tehsil: Ludhiana West

Government
  - Type: Panchayati raj (India)
  - Body: Gram panchayat

Languages
  - Official: Punjabi
  - Other spoken: Hindi
- Time zone: UTC+5:30 (IST)
- Telephone code: 0161
- ISO 3166 code: IN-PB
- Vehicle registration: PB-10
- Website: ludhiana.nic.in

Brahman Majra is a village located in the Ludhiana West tehsil, of Ludhiana district, Punjab.

== History ==
Brahman Majra was the site where the Battle of Kiratpur was fought in 1638, Guru Hargobind and a following of 22 Sikhs were ambushed by Mughal-aligned forces of the Pathans of Ropar. The Guru and his men successfully held off the larger Mughal forces until reinforcements arrived, and then defeated them decisively.

== Administration ==
The village is administrated by a Sarpanch who is an elected representative of village as per constitution of India and Panchayati raj (India).

Particulars	Total	Male	Female
Total No. of Houses	119		
Population	654	343	311
Child (0–6)	60	32	28
Schedule Caste	253	128	125
Schedule Tribe	0	0	0
Literacy	89.56 %	93.89 %	84.81 %
Total Workers	243	180	63
Main Worker	240	0	0
Marginal Worker	03	03	70

== Air travel connectivity ==
The closest airport to the village is Sahnewal Airport.
