= Bidhi Chand =

Sikh commander and preacher (1579–1638)

Baba Bidhi Chand Chhina Ji
- ਬਿਧੀ ਚੰਦ
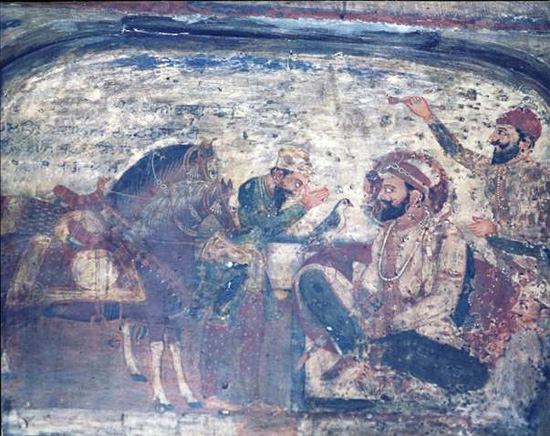
- Guru Hargobind and Bidhi Chand in a 19th century fresco

Personal life
- Born: Bidhi Chand; 26 April 1579 Sarhali, Amritsar, Punjab, Mughal Empire (India)
- Died: 30 August 1638 (aged 59) Deonagar (or Devnagar), near Ayodhya, Mughal Empire
- Children: Lal Chand (son)
- Parent: Vasan (father)
- Known for: Finding the horse given to Guru Hargobind

Religious life
- Religion: Sikhism

Military service
- Battles/wars: Early Mughal-Sikh Wars: Battle of Kartarpur; Battle of Amritsar (1634); Battle of Lahira or Gurusar; Battle of Rohilla or Hargobindpur

Bidhi Chand (Gurmukhi: ਬਿਧੀ ਚੰਦ; 26 April 1579 – 30 August 1638 or 1640) was a Sikh religious preacher and military commander. (Note: also spelt Bidhia) He was a disciple of Guru Arjan and served Guru Hargobind for most of his life. He is remembered for recovering two horses named Dilbagh and Gulbagh for the sixth Sikh guru.

== Biography ==
=== Early life ===
He was born into a Jat Sikh family of the Chhina clan. His father was named Vassan of Sursingh, his grandfather was named Bhikkhi, and his mother was from Sirhali. He is not to be confused with another Bidhi Chand, son of Hindal. As a young man, Bidhi Chand was an inhabitant of the Sur Singh village of Lahore district and had fallen into bad company and taken banditry. One day, a pious Sikh, Bhai Adali of the village of Chohia, led him into Guru Arjan Dev 's presence where he underwent a remarkable transformation. His life of banditry and misdeeds ended for he knew now wanted nothing more than life of dedication to the service of the Guru. He became a devotee of Guru Arjan.

=== Later life ===
He was one of the five Sikhs chosen to accompany Guru Arjun on his journey to martyrdom at Lahore in 1606. On the death of his father, Guru Hargobind turned his thoughts to training and raising an army to resist the dangers that threatened the Sikhs. He chose Baba Bidhi Chand to be one of the commanders of the Risaldari (cavalry) he was raising. Baba Bidhi Chand was the first ever commander in chief of cavalry who fought with Mughals in the absence of Guru Hargobind Sahib . Baba Bidhi Chand displayed great feats of valour in several battles with the Mughal troops. He was one of the first four commanders of the Akal Sena, the first standing Sikh army which was started by Guru Hargobind.

==== Dilbagh and Gulbagh ====
A Sikh sakhi narrates a story involving the recapture of two horses, which had been forcibly taken from the Sikhs by the Mughals, by Bidhi Chand. The horses had been seized as the owner, a Sikh who had raised and trained them, was bringing them from Kabul as an offering for the Guru in the company of two masands who had been dispatched to the local Sikh congregation of Kabul. Bidhi Chand was chosen as the best choice for the mission to recapture the prized horses, named Dilbagh and Gulbagh, from the hands of the Mughal emperor Shah Jahan. Bidhi Chand accomplished this task by becoming employed at the stable of the Lahore Fort where the horses were kept as the worker who brought the horses fresh grass to feed to the horses and their personal groomer, he used a false name of "Kasera" while he worked there. He stayed at the residence of a local Sikh named Jiwan during the time of his employment and he refused to accept the pay he was afforded by the officials. He eventually won the trust of the officials who were in-charge of guarding the fort after being employed there for some time. Every night, he would desensitize the guards to sounds coming from the Ravi River by throwing large rocks into it and tell them it was just a large animal, to mask his coming plan. Later on, he managed to escape with one of the horses, Dilbagh, by jumping into the Ravi River (whose course at that time flowed near the fort) at night when the guards were sound asleep after being fed a large feast under the patronage of Bidhi Chand on his payday. He brought the horse back to the encampment of the Guru.

However, this was only one of the horses, Dilbagh, and he still had to capture the other, Gulbagh. He returned to Lahore and was assisted by a local Sikh named Bhai Bohru. He managed to escape with the other horse by fooling the official caretaker of the horses, Sondha Khan, by disguising himself and pretending to be an astrologer investigating the disappearance of the first horse (which he had actually been the one who had stolen it). The horses were renamed by the Sikhs, with Dilbagh being renamed as Jan Bhai (meaning "as dear to life") and Gulbagh being renamed as Suhela (meaning "dear companion").

After the rescue of the horses, the Guru famously proclaimed: "Bidhichand Chhinā Guru ka Sīnā. Prem bhagat linā. Kade kami nān." (meaning: "Bidhi Chand Chhina is very near to Guru's heart. He is a lovable devotee. He will never suffer from want.")

==== Military service ====
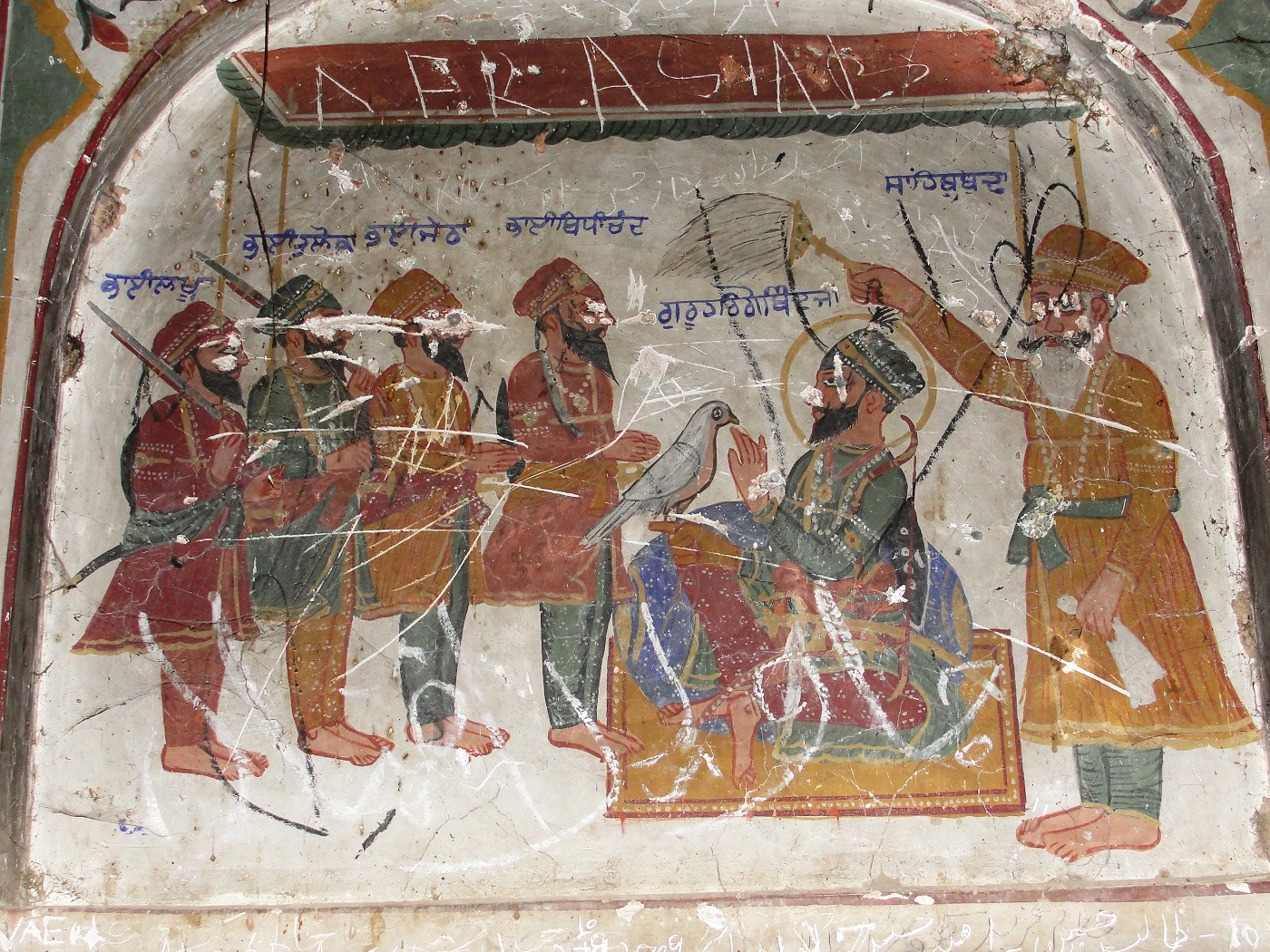
Mural of Guru Hargobind, with Bhai Lakhu, Bhai Tiloka, Bhai Jetha, Bhai Bidhi Chand, and Baba Buddha, from an unidentified Samadhi located near Gurdwara Bhai Than Singh at Kot Fateh Khan, Attock, Punjab

All of the events associated with Dilbagh and Gulbagh led to the Battle of Lahira where over 35,000 Mughals were dispatched by Shah Jahan under the governor of Kabul to finish off the Sikhs. 500-1500 Sikh soldiers were placed under Bidhi Chand's command during the battle. Bidhi Chand faced the Mughal general Shamas Beg who had 7,000 soldiers under him. The battle between the two forces lasted 1 hour and 30 minutes. Shamas Beg's entire force of 7,000 was killed with Beg being cut in half by Bidhi Chand in a duel. Later in the battle Bidhi Chand fought another Mughal general, Kabul Beg, who managed to gain the upper hand and injured Bidhi Chand. At the end the battle was a Sikh victory.

Dilbagh later died on the banks of the Sutlej river, due to wounds sustained in the battle, during the journey and relocation of Guru Hargobind and his retinue to Kiratpur.

Bidhi Chand also participated in the Battle of Kartarpur. He along with Baba Gurditta were given the lead responsibilities of defending Kartarpur. He was eventually sent into the battle when the Mughal governor of Peshawar, Kale Khan, advanced with 20,00 troops. He along with Jati Mal held off the 20,000 Mughal soldiers. A Mughal general, Anwar Khan, was killed by an arrow fired by Bidhi Chand.

==== Missionary work ====
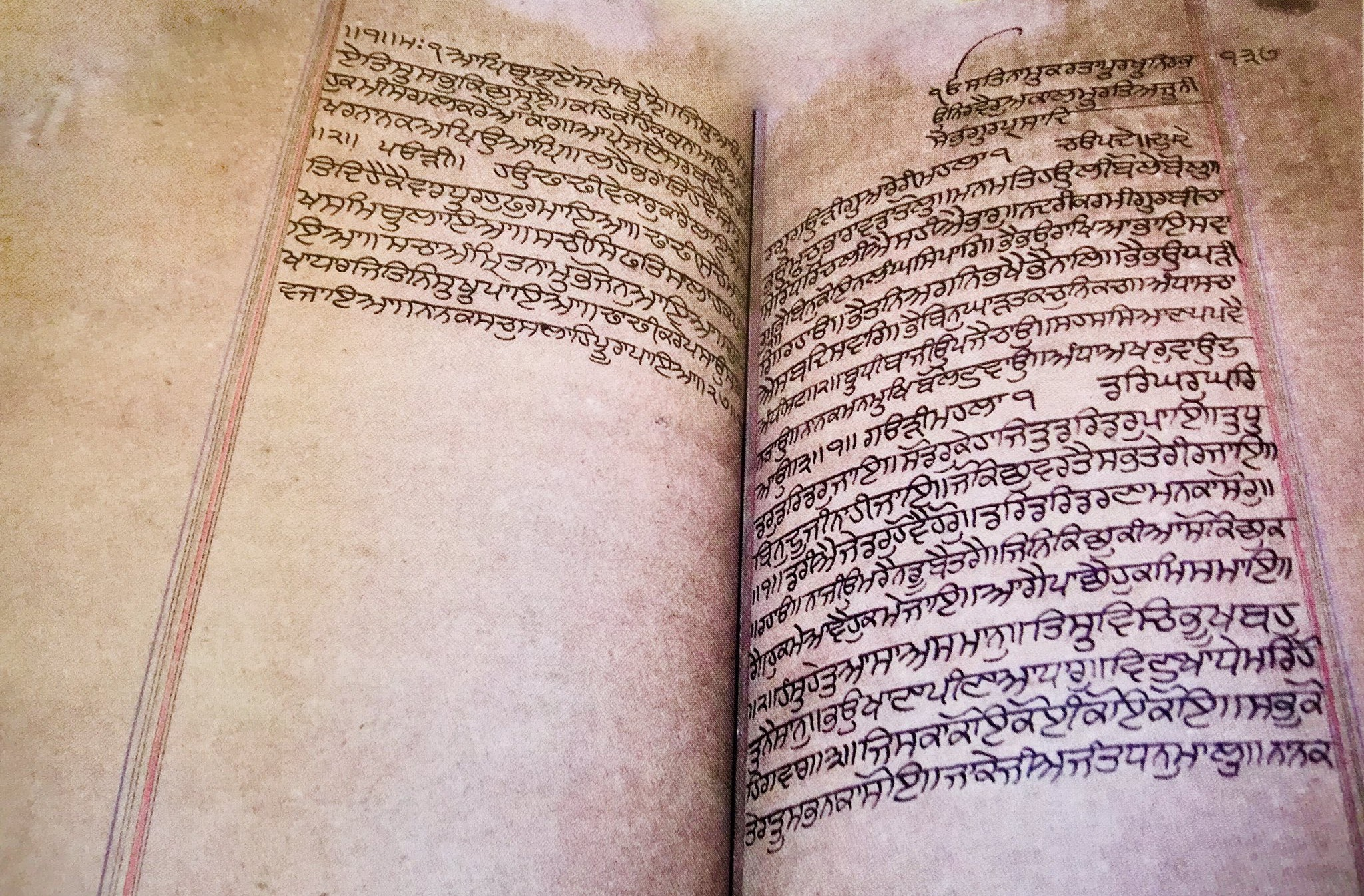
Page 151 of a Guru Granth Sahib manuscript prepared by Bhai Bidhi Chand under the guidance of Guru Hargobind Sahib from the Sur Singh Wala Collection.

Guru Hargobind instructed Bidhi Chand to travel to the eastern regions of the Indian subcontinent to act as a missionary to spread the teachings of the Sikh faith. At Deonagar (or Devnagar), he met Pir Sundar Shah, the disciple of Pir Budhan Shah, and the two developed a close bond. He also became close with Pir Budhan Shah. After the death of his master, Budhan Shah, Pir Sundar Shah visited Kiratpur where he petitioned Bidhi Chand to visit him at Deonagar once again, whom promised him that he shall fulfill this request within a month of his death as he refused to leave the side of his beloved Guru.

==== Death ====
In the year 1638, Bidhi Chand departed from Kiratpur, where he left his son, Lal Chand, in the service of Guru Hargobind, and died at Deonagar (or Devnagar) while in a state of meditation, on the banks of the river Gomti. He died alongside his friend, Sundar Shah. According to Bhagat Singh, Bidhi Chand died alongside Sundar Shah on 14 August 1640.

== Legacy ==
The body of Bidhi Chand was cremated as per Sikh rites by the Muslim followers of Sundar Shah and a samadh for him was raised at Devnagar. After a while, a nephew of Bidhi Chand named Lal Chand took some dirt from the samadh to establish another samadh dedicated to Bidhi Chand at his native village Sursingh.

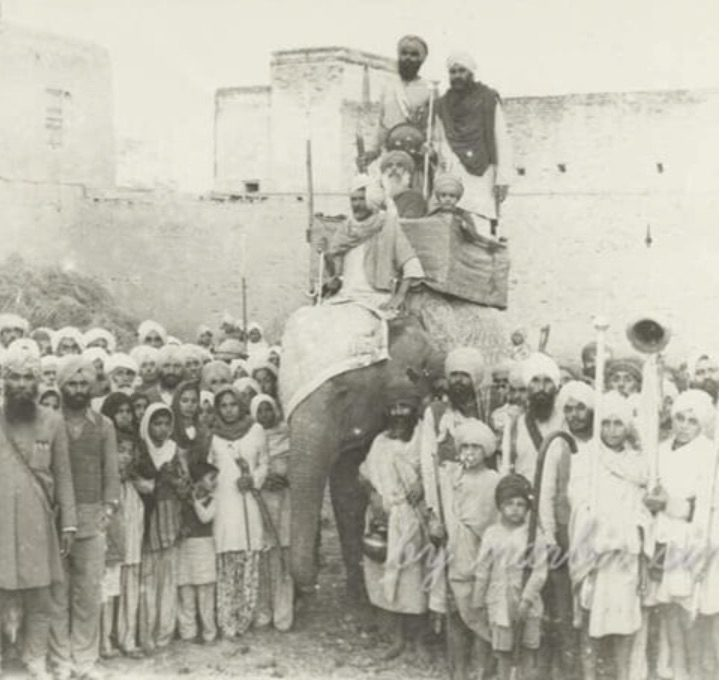
Bidhi Chand Dal (early 20th century)

Many of Chand's swords and paintings are displayed in the museum of the Golden Temple. A faction of Akali-Nihangs, the Bidhi Chand Dal, is named for him.
