= Battle of Kartarpur =

1635 conflict between Sikhs and the Mughal empire

Coordinates: 31°19′32″N 75°34′45″E

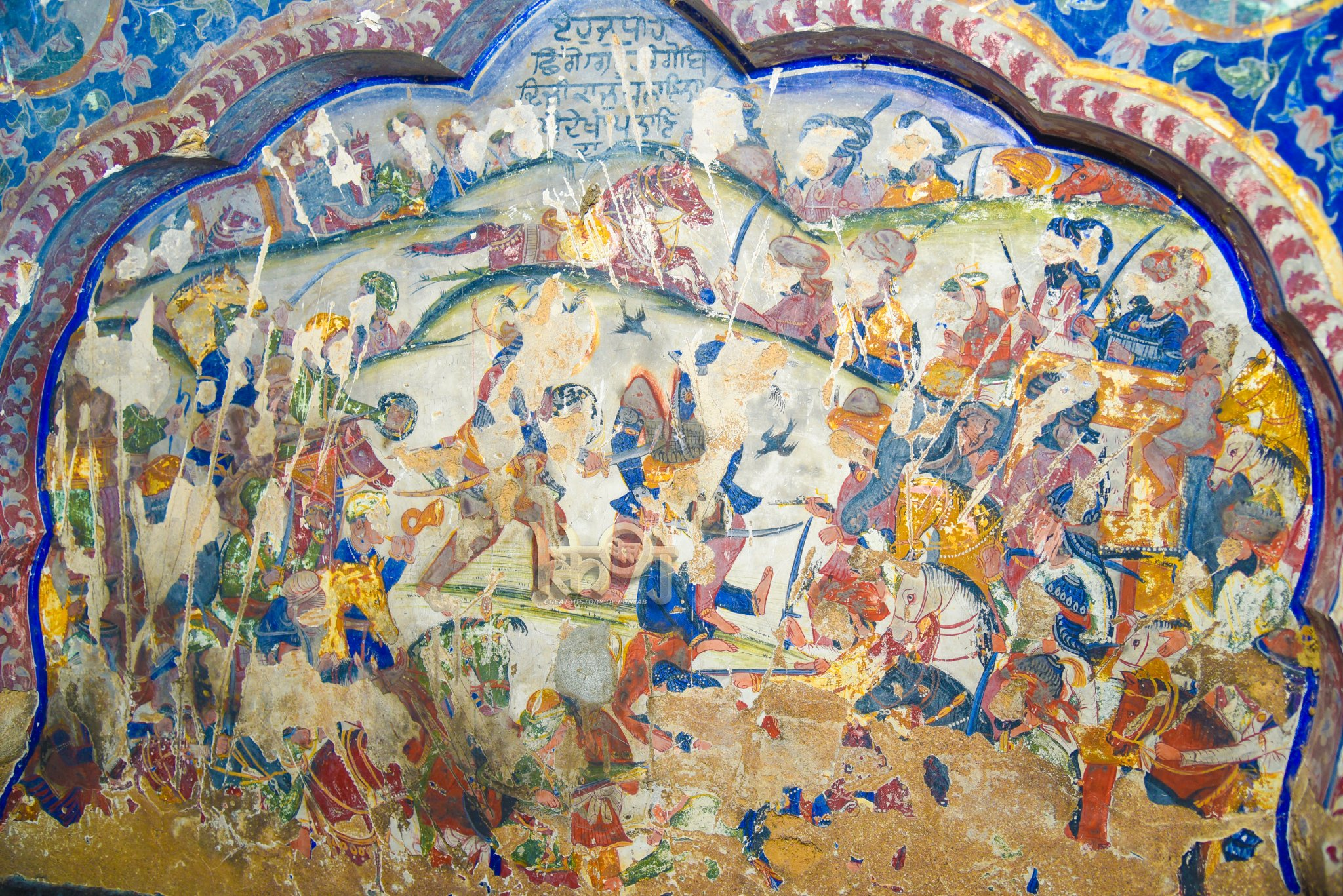
- Defaced, abraded, and deteriorated mural depicting the Battle of Kartarpur (April 1635) from Gurdwara Chhevin Patshahi, Hadiara, Lahore district. In the middle can be seen Guru Hargobind slicing Painde Khan into two
Date	25 April 1635
Location	Kartarpur
Result	Sikh victory

Belligerents
Akal Sena (Sikhs)	Mughal Empire

Commanders and leaders
Guru Hargobind; Tegh Bahadur; Bidhi Chand; Baba Gurditta; Bhai Jati Malik; Bhai Lakhi Das; Bhatt Fateh Chand †; Bhatt Amir Chand †; Bhai Mehar Chand	Shah Jahan; Kale Khan †; Kutub Khan †; Painda Khan †; Anwar Khan †; Azmat Khan †; Khoja Anwar †

The Battle of Kartarpur occurred on 25 April 1635. It was the final major military engagement of Guru Hargobind, the sixth Sikh Guru, against the imperial forces of the Mughal Empire. Following previous Sikh victories in the Battle of Amritsar (1634) and Battle of Lahira, tensions between the Guru and Shah Jahan had reached a peak.

The battle occurred in the locality of Kartarpur in present-day Jalandhar district of Indian Punjab.

== Background ==
The immediate cause of the conflict was the defection of Painde Khan, a former general in the Guru's army following a personal dispute. Painde Khan sought the assistance of the Mughal Governor of Jalandhar, Kale Khan, and convinced the imperial authorities to launch an expedition against the Guru's stronghold at Kartarpur. Kale Khan's brother Mukhlis Khan had earlier been killed by Guru Hargobind in the Battle of Amritsar (1634). He was joined by Qutub Khan, (Qutab or Kutub, the faujdar of Jalandhar) Kohja Anwar, and Painda.

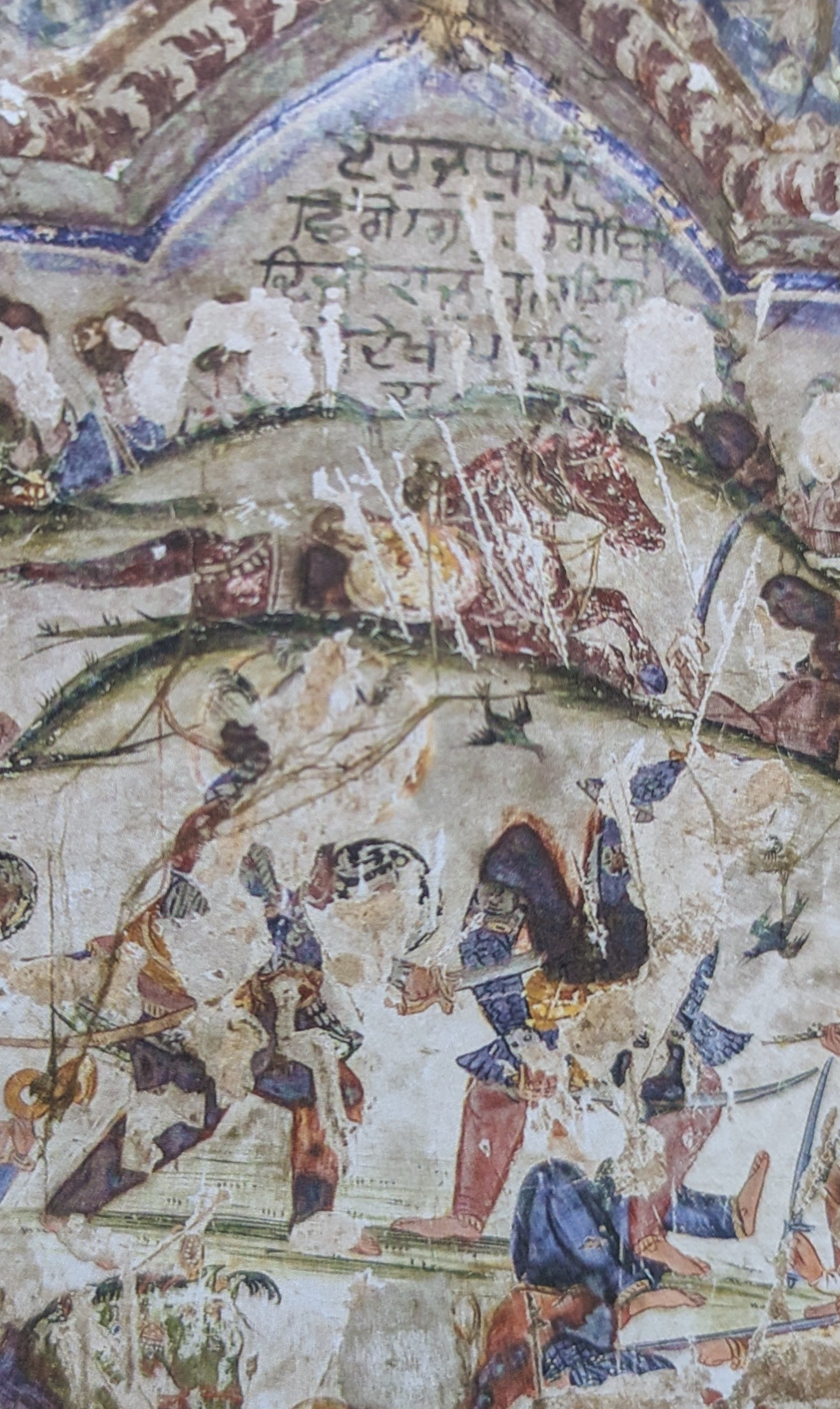
Painde Khan (right) being cut into two by Guru Hargobind (left) during the battle

== The Battle ==
The Mughal forces, significantly outnumbering the Sikhs, besieged the town of Kartarpur. The Sikh defense was led by Guru Hargobind and his sons. Notably, the Guru's youngest son, Tyag Mal, displayed exceptional valor and swordsmanship during the engagement. His performance was so distinguished that his father renamed him Tegh Bahadur ("Brave wielder of the Sword").

The climax of the battle involved a series of single combats between the commanders. Guru Hargobind engaged his former general, Painde Khan, in a duel. According to historical accounts, the Guru allowed Khan to strike first, and upon his failure, the Guru delivered a fatal blow. Shortly thereafter, the Mughal commanders Kale Khan and Qutub Khan were also killed, leading to the total retreat of the Mughal army.

Kartarpur was defended by Bhai Bidhi Chand with Guru Hargobind and his eldest son Baba Gurdita supporting him.

== Aftermath ==
The victory at Kartarpur was a strategic triumph for the Sikh community, demonstrating their ability to withstand large-scale imperial assaults. However, recognizing that the plains of the Punjab were vulnerable to repeated sieges, Guru Hargobind decided to shift the Sikh headquarters to Kiratpur Sahib in the foothills of the Shivalik Hills. This move provided a more defensible position and marked the end of the Guru's active military campaigns, as he spent his final years focused on spiritual and missionary work.

After the battle, Sri Guru Hargobind Sahib travelled to Giractpur (Kirtapur) via Bhawarati (Phagwara). At Palahi village near Phagwara, he was set upon by royal forces under Ahmad Khan, and suffered considerable losses. He remained in Kiratpur until his death.

On the Sikh side, Bhatt Fateh Chand and Bhatt Amir Chand (sons of Dharma Bhatt and grandsons of Bhoja Bhatt) were killed in battle.
