= Suraj Mal (Sikhism) =

Suraj Mal (9 June 1617 – 1645), also spelt as Surajmal, was son of Guru Hargobind and Mata Marvahi and was born in Amritsar. On 23 April 1629, he married Khem Kaur, daughter of Prem Chand of Kartarpur (Jalandhar district), with the couple having a son named Dip Chand in 1633. Other sources claim Suraj Mal had a wife named Mata Hariji. Suraj Mal had little interest in religious matters and was attached to the world, so Guru Hargobind did not consider him for the guruship as his successor. Suraj Mal owned a dwelling in the city of Anandpur Sahib called Manji Sahib. Suraj Mal Suraj Mal died in 1645. His corpse was cremated at Kiratpur and dispersed at Gurdwara Patalpuri Sahib. Suraj Mal descendants reside at Anandpur Sahib, moving there after Guru Gobind Singh vacated it in 1704.

== Legacy and descendants ==
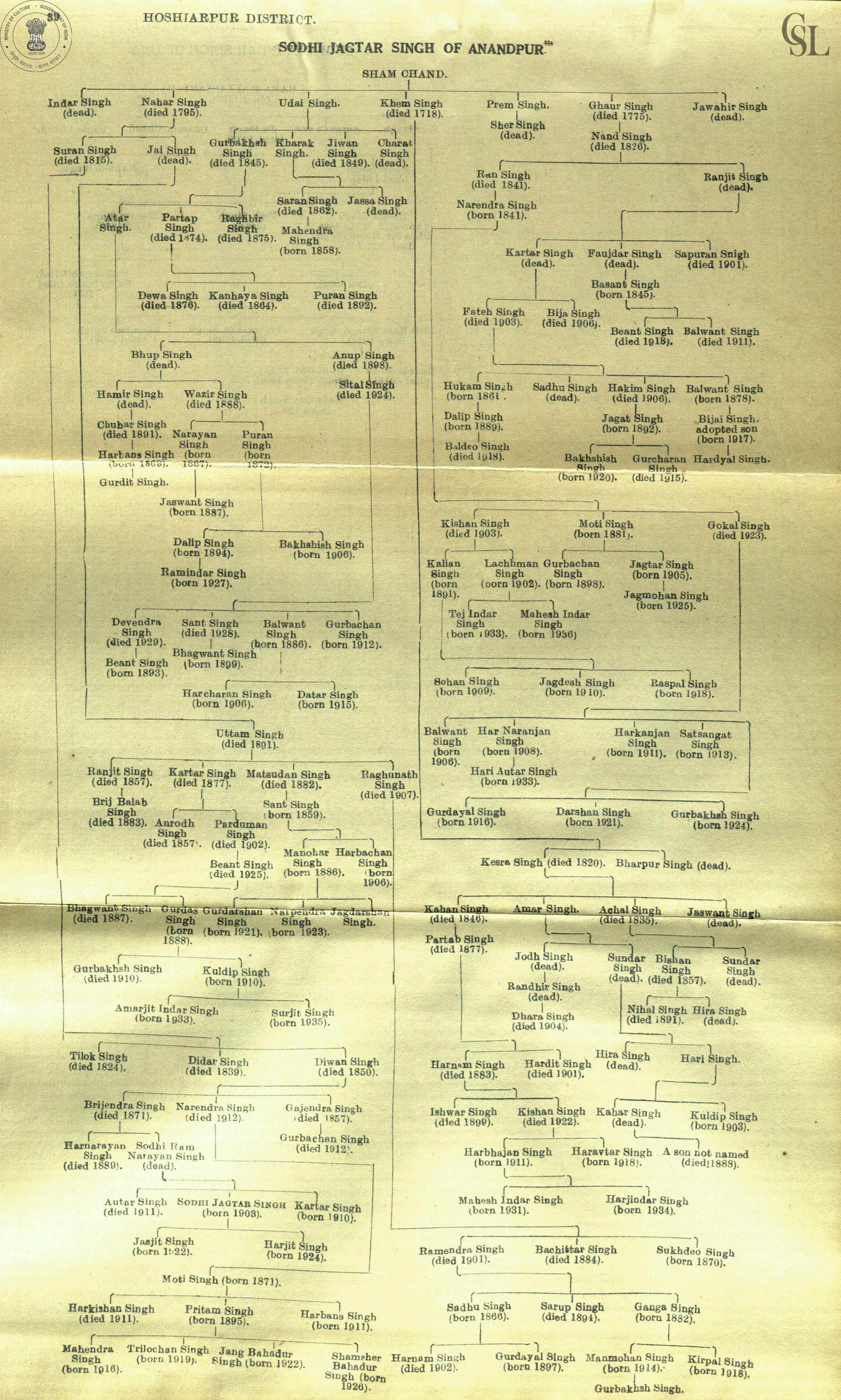
Genealogical pedigree (family-tree) of the Sodhi family of Anandpur, Punjab, revised pedigree-table (1940)

Guru Tegh Bahadur did not seek refuge with the family of Suraj Mal at Kiratpur as he did not wish to disturb him, so he founded Anandpur Sahib. Suraj Mal's family and descendants resided at Anandpur and Kiratpur, however they vacated the area for Nahan during the persecution of the Sikhs during December 1705 – October 1707, with Anandpur and Kiratpur being deserted by the Sikhs. This family were the first Sikhs to return to Anandpur and Kiratpur after Sikhs had left it during the period of Mughal oppression.

His son, Dip Chand, had two sons named Gulab Rai (born 1660) and Shyam Chand (born 1662), who were baptized into the Khalsa by Guru Gobind Singh, becoming Gulab Singh and Shyam Singh, whom were assigned to look over the forts of Anandpur Sahib by Guru Gobind Singh. The Sodhis of Anandpur Sahib descend from Suraj Mal's grandson, Shyam Singh.Their descendants at Anandpur Sahib would become the recipients of revenue-free land. In 1764, a direct descendant of Suraj Mal, named Sodhi Nahar Singh, purchased the city of Anandpur.
