= Nanaki =

Nanaki may refer to:

- Red XIII, a character in the video game Final Fantasy VII
- Bebe Nanaki, sister of the Sikh Guru Nanak
- Mata Nanaki, wife of the Sikh Guru Hargobind
