= Bhatt Kirat =

Contributor of Guru Granth Sahib

Personal life
- Born: Unknown date Sultanpur Lodhi, Lahore Subah, Mughal Empire (Present-day Kapurthala, Punjab, India)
- Died: 13 April 1634 Amritsar, Lahore Subah, Mughal Empire (Present-day Punjab, India)
- Children: Bhai Bohath (son); Bhai Keso Singh Shaheed (grandson); Bhai Narbud Singh Shaheed (great-grandson); Bhai Hari Singh Shaheed (grandson); Bhai Tara Singh Shaheed (great-grandson); Bhai Seva Singh Shaheed (great-grandson); Bhai Deva Singh Shaheed (great-grandson); Bhai Desa Singh Shaheed (grandson)
- Known for: Contributor of the Guru Granth Sahib; Jathedar of Akal Sena; Martyrdom in Battle of Amritsar (1634)
- Relations: Bhatt Bhikha (father); Bhatt Mathura (brother)

Religious life
- Religion: Sikhism

Bhatt Kirat was a Brahmin bard in the court of Guru Arjan, whose eight hymns are present in Guru Granth Sahib, the holy book of Sikhs. The title Bhatt is given to learned Brahmins.

== Early life ==
Kirat was born, in Sultanpur Lodhi to Bhatt Bhika, in a Gaur Brahmin family (of Kaushish gotra) and he was brother of Bhatt Mathura. His father's ancestors settled in Sultanpur from Ladwa village near Kurukshetra city (present day Haryana).

== Battle of Amritsar (1634) ==
Bhai Kirat being tired of Mughal oppression, joined the sixth guru, Guru Hargobind to fight against the Mughal Empire. He contributed and fought valiantly in Battle of Amritsar and killed Lahore’s Subedar Murtza Khan but because of heavy injury and blood loss, he attained martyrdom on the battlefield.
