= Jang-e-Azadi Memorial =

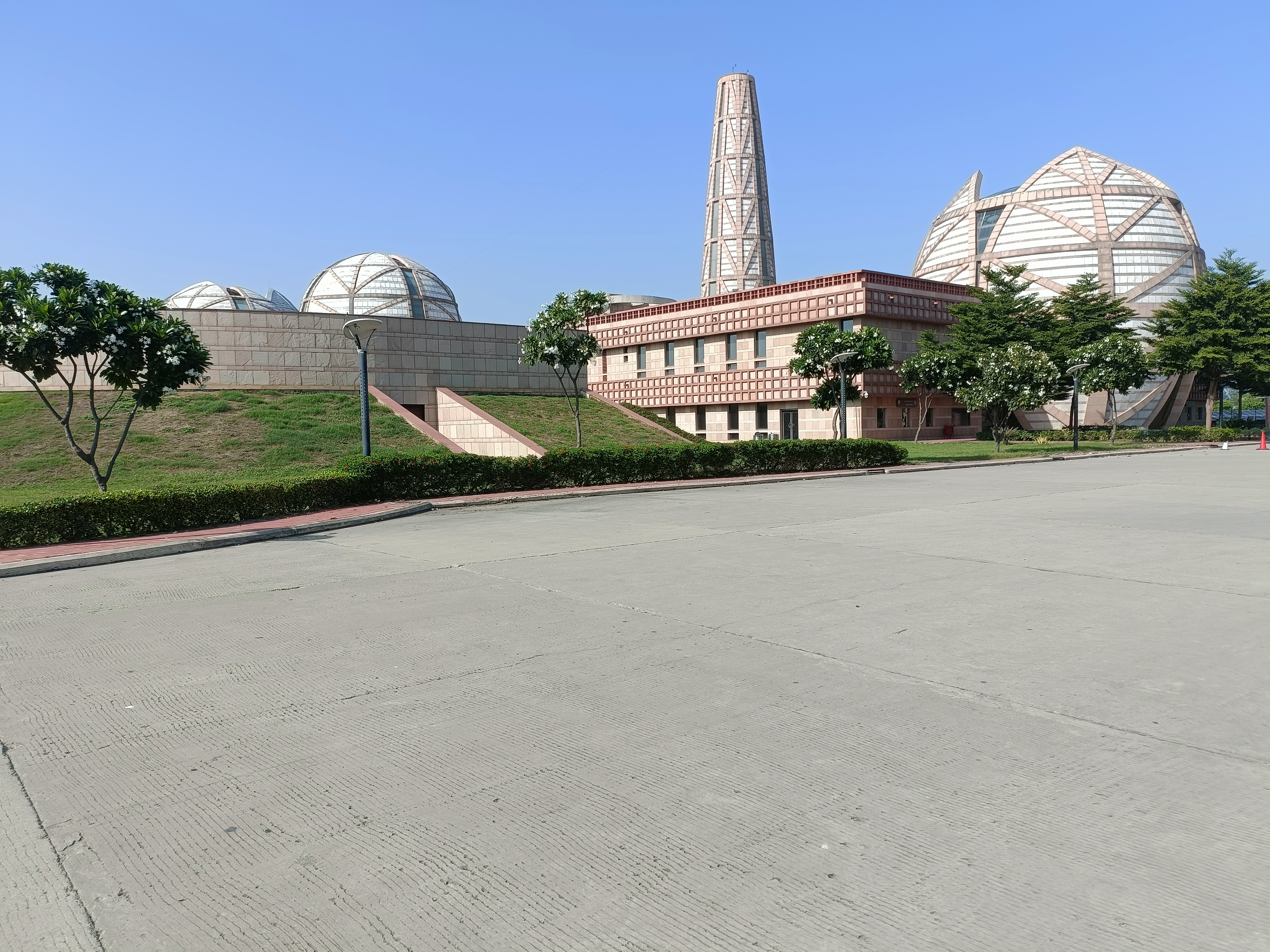
- Jang-e-Azadi Memorial, Kartarpur, Jalandhar, Punjab, India
- Established: 19 October 2014 Construction start date
- Location: Kartarpur, near Jalandhar city, Punjab, India
- Coordinates: 31°26′02″N 75°30′21″E
- Type: Museum
- Founders: Director Department of Tourism and Cultural Affairs, Punjab
- Owner: Punjab Govt.
- Parking: 5 acre

Jang-e-Azadi Memorial (lit. 'Battle for Freedom Memorial') is a memorial and museum in Kartarpur town (near the city of Jalandhar) in Jalandhar district of Punjab, India, in memory of contribution and sacrifices made by the Punjabi community in Indian independence movement. The memorial was built over an area of 25 acres at the cost of ₹300 crore.

== Construction ==
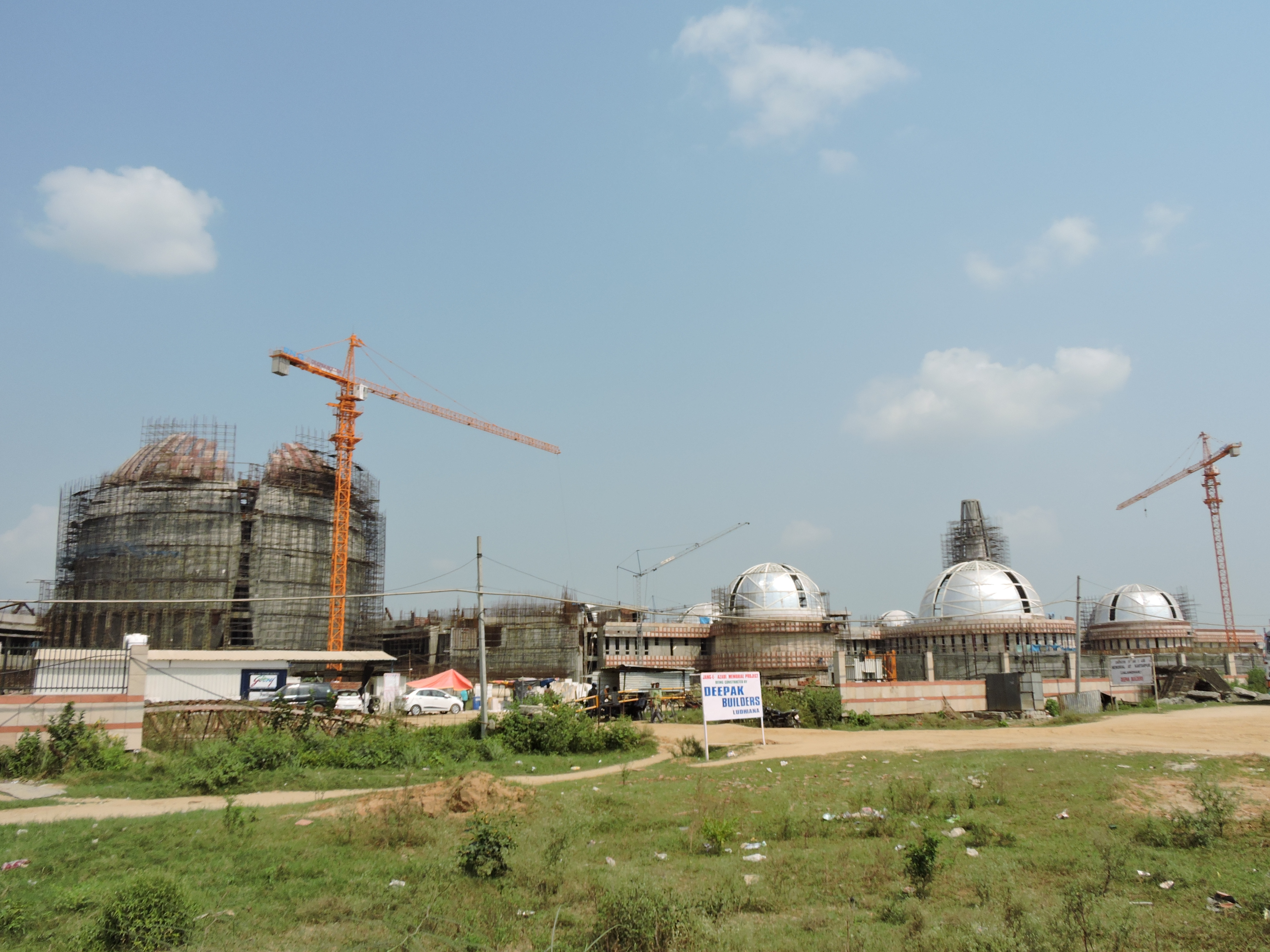
memorial during construction

Punjab chief minister Parkash Singh Badal laid the foundation stone of the Jang-e-Azadi memorial on 19 October 2014, and actual work started on 26 March 2015. A committee of historians, journalists and intellectuals was constituted to finalize the action plan and concept of the memorial to be built up.

== Architecture ==
The project is designed by architect Raj Rewal. The design layout of the memorial, conceived and designed by him was approved by the Government. As per the proposed design various galleries were constructed to project the different movements of freedom struggle. A tower also known as Shaheed-e-Minar (Martyrs' Minaret) 45 metre high was proposed. In addition to it, an auditorium, movie hall, open-air theatre, amphitheater, library, research and seminar halls etc. were also constructed as an integral part of the memorial galleries.
