= Battle of Kiratpur =

Battle involving Guru Hargobind

- Part of Early Mughal-Sikh Wars
Date	29 April 1638
Location	Kharkar to Kiratpur Sahib route
Result	Sikh victory

Belligerents
Akal Sena (Sikhs)	Mughal Empire: Pathans of Ropar; Gujjars of Nangal Gujjaran; Ranghars of Malakpur

Commanders and leaders
Guru Hargobind; Baba Gurdita	Ruler of Ropar (surrendered)

Strength
23 (during the siege - later reinforced with larger army According to Historians 1,200)	1,00,000 Mughal and Afghan Soldiers

Casualties and losses
only 23 Sikhs Killed	30,000 Killed

The Battle of Kiratpur, also known as the Battle of Kiratpur Sahib, took place between the Sikhs, commanded by Guru Hargobind, and the Mughals, commanded by the Ruler and Pathans of Ropar. This skirmish is historically notable as the final military conflict involving Guru Hargobind before he focused on the spiritual consolidation of the Sikh community.

== Background ==
Following several major confrontations with Mughal authorities in the plains of Punjab, Guru Hargobind established the town of Kiratpur Sahib in the Shivalik foothills as a strategic and spiritual headquarters. The Guru's growing influence and the establishment of a semi-autonomous Sikh center drew the ire of local chieftains. The Pathans and local Gujjars of Ropar, seeking to avenge previous military setbacks and curb the expansion of the Sikh community, planned a surprise assault on the Guru while he was traveling.

== Battle ==
The Pathans launched a surprise attack on Guru Hargobind who was accompanied by only 22 Sikhs.

Guru Hargobind was forced to take shelter in Brahman Majra where he and the Sikhs held off the Mughal and coalition forces until reinforcements from Kiratpur could arrive. The arrival of these reinforcements turned the tide, leading to a rout of the Mughal and Pathan forces.

== Outcome and Legacy ==
The battle resulted in a decisive Sikh victory. The Pathans were forced to retreat back to Ropar, ensuring a safe passage for the Guru to Kiratpur Sahib.

Kiratpur Sahib, a gurdwara was constructed at the location of the battle by Sant Kartar Singh Bhindranwale in 1975.

== See also ==
- Nihang
- Martyrdom and Sikhism
