= Battle of Amritsar =

Battle of Amritsar may refer to these battles in Amritsar, Punjab, India:

Mughal–Sikh Wars

- Battle of Amritsar (1634)
- Battle of Amritsar (1709)
- Siege of Amritsar (1748)

Afghan–Sikh Wars

- Battle of Amritsar (1757)
- Battle of Pipli Sahib (1762)
- Battle of Amritsar (1797)
- Battle of Amritsar (1798)
