= Kartarpur, India =

Kartarpur
- Town
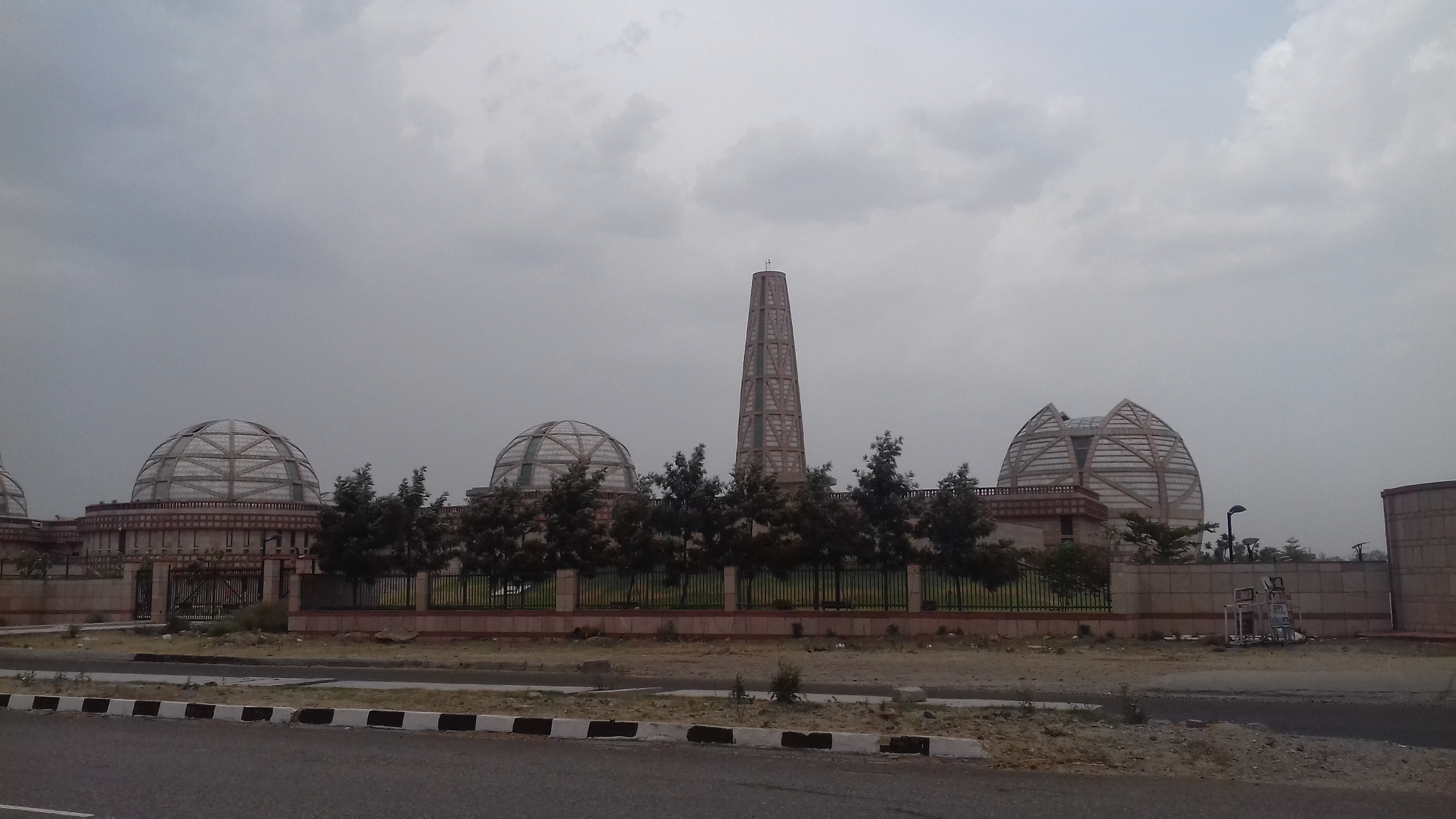
- Jang-e-Azadi Memorial in Kartarpur in Jalandhar district, Punjab, India

- Location in Punjab, India Kartarpur (India)
- Coordinates: 31.44°N 75.5°E
- Country: India
- State: Punjab
- District: Jalandhar
- Founder: Sri Guru Arjan Dev Ji

Government
  - Type: Municipal committee
  - Body: Nagar Palika
- Elevation: 228 m (748 ft)

Population (2011)
  - Total: 25,662

Languages
  - Official: Punjabi, Hindi
- Time zone: UTC+5:30 (IST)
- PIN: 144801
- Telephone code: 0181
- Vehicle registration: PB 90

Kartarpur is a town, near the city of Jalandhar in Jalandhar district in the Indian state of Punjab and is located in the Doaba region of the state. It was founded by the fifth Guru of the Sikhs, Guru Arjan.

== History ==
Kartarpur was founded by Guru Arjan. It was the "new" Kartarpur, as the "old" Kartarpur had been established earlier by Guru Nanak in the 1520s in present-day Narowal district of Pakistani Punjab. In 1628, Guru Hargobind shifted the base for the Sikhs from Amritsar to Kartarpur. In 1634, he again shifted the base from Kartarpur to Kiratpur Sahib, where he founded. In April 1635, a battle occurred here between the Sikhs, led by Guru Hargobind, and the Mughals, having been instigated against the Sikhs by Painde Khan. The Sodhi descendants of Guru Hargobind through his grandson Dhir Mal (son of Baba Gurditta) resided at Kartarpur.

== Geography ==
Kartarpur is located at 31.44°N 75.5°E. It has an average elevation of 228 metres (748 feet). It is situated at a distance of 15 km from Jalandhar towards Amritsar on G.T. Road (National Highway 1).

== Demographics ==
As of 2001 India census, Kartarpur had a population of 25,152. Males constitute 54% of the population and females 46%. Kartarpur has an average literacy rate of 69%, higher than the national average of 59.5%: male literacy is 72%, and female literacy is 66%. In Kartarpur, 12% of the population is under six years of age. Kartarpur has 14 municipal wards.

== Jang-e-Azadi Kartarpur Museum ==
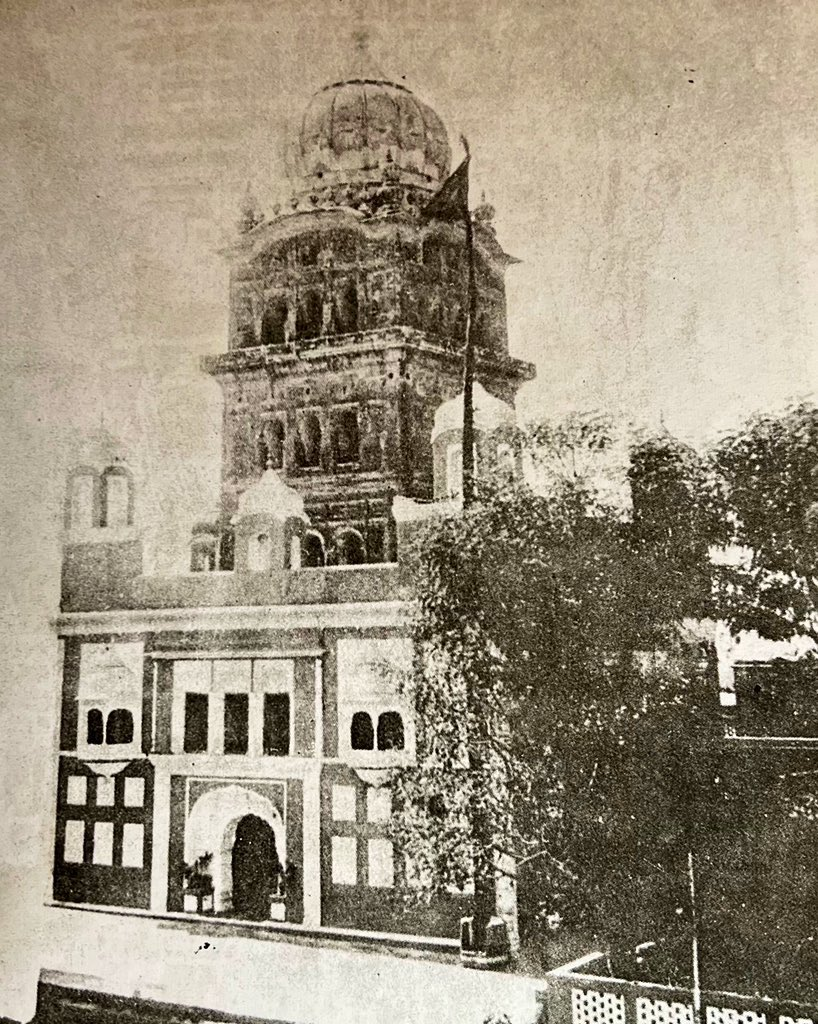
Gurdwara Tham Sahib, Kartarpur (Jalandhar), circa 1924

Jang-e-Azadi Memorial is a memorial and museum being built in Kartarpur town of Punjab, India, in memory of contribution and sacrifices made by the Punjabi community in Indian independence movement.

== Transport ==
Kartarpur railway station is the main railway station of the town which is situated on Ambala–Attari line under Firozpur railway division of Northern Railway zone.
