= Battle of Lahira =

1634 conflict between Sikhs and the Mughal empire

Date	15 October 1634 or 1631
Location	Bathinda
Result	Sikh victory

Belligerents
Akal Sena (Sikhs); Kangra State	Mughal Empire

Commanders and leaders
Guru Hargobind; Bidhi Chand (WIA); Bhai Jetha †; Bhai Jati Mal (WIA); Painde Khan; Rai Jodh (WIA)	Shah Jahan; Lala Beg †; Kamar Beg †; Kasam Beg †; Samas Beg †; Kabul Beg †

Strength
3,000 Sikhs 1,000 Kangra soldiers	Unknown

Casualties and losses
1,200 killed or wounded	Heavy, more numerous than the Sikhs

The Battle of Lahira, also known as the Battle of Gurusar or the Battle of Mehraj, was fought between the Mughal Empire and Sikhs assisted by the Kangra State in 1631 or 1634.

== Background ==
One of Guru Hargobind devoted Sikhs, Sadh (also called Sadah or Sadhu), was assigned to bring horses from Central Asia. According to Mohsin Fani, just after Sadh left Amritsar, he received news that his young son had fallen seriously ill and was asked to return home. However, Sadh was so dedicated to the Guru that he refused, saying that if his son died, there was enough wood at home for his cremation. He continued his journey although his son died. Sadh first traveled to Balkh but did not find the quality of horses he was looking for. He then went to Iraq, where he bought three fine horses. On his way back, he traveled with Mohsin Fani from Kabul to Lahore. Mohsin Fani described Sadh as someone who remained happy in good times and did not lose heart in difficult situations.

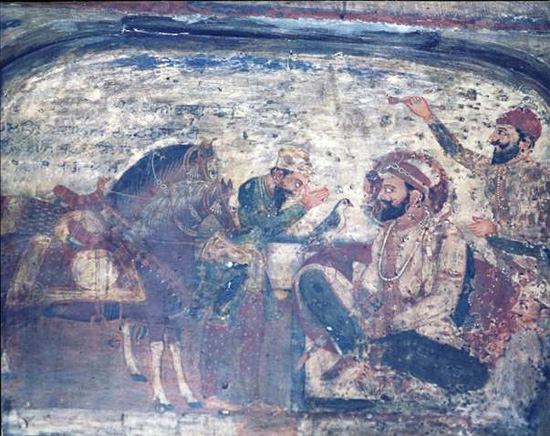
Guru Hargobind and Baba Bidhi Chand painting from the pre-1984 Akal Takht complex. It depicts a story related to Bidhi Chand Chhina finding the horses (named Dilbagh and Gulbagh, later renamed Jan Bhai and Suhela, respectively) of Guru Hargobind.

At Lahore, the Governor, Khalil Beg, seized two of Sadh's horses, Dilbagh and Gulbagh. Another Sikh, Bidhi Chand, was assigned to recover them. Mohsin Fani mentions that Bidhi Chand had been a thief in his early life. The Guru often sent him to punish wrongdoers. He once told Bidhi Chand that his disciples would not have to justify their actions on Judgment Day. Bidhi Chand disguised himself and took a job in the Lahore fort, first as a groom for the horses and then as a tracker. Over time, he managed to escape with both horses, one after the other. The Guru later renamed them Janbhai and Suhela. Guru Hargobind also recruited a Pathan soldier, Paindah Khan, for five rupees a day. Paindah Khan's mother had been the Guru's wet nurse, and he had been a childhood friend of Hargobind. The Guru treated him well, giving him a house and a buffalo for milk.

== Battle ==
Knowing the Mughal Empire's strength and his own limited resources, the Guru anticipated an attack. He took refuge in the Lakhi Jungle between Firozpur and Bhatinda. As expected, the Lahore Governor sent a strong force after him. Kamar Beg and Lal Beg led an army that crossed the Sutlej River, but their soldiers suffered due to a lack of food and the tough journey. The Guru retreated deeper into the region of the Brar Jats, a strong warrior community who supported the Sikhs because of Guru Amar Das's missionary system. The Sikhs ambushed the enemy and won the battle but lost 1,200 soldiers. The battle took place near Lahara Gaga on December 16, 1634.

== Aftermath ==
The Guru then moved north, with the Mughals still chasing him. Another battle took place, and at that site, he built a water tank called Gurusar Sahib, near the village of Nathana. Mohsin Fani wrote that Khalil Beg's unjust actions did not bring him success. That same year, his son, who had played a role in the incident, died, and Khalil Beg himself faced humiliation and disgrace.
