= Guru Hargobind =

Sixth Sikh guru from 1606 to 1644

- ਗੁਰੂ ਹਰਿਗੋਬਿੰਦ
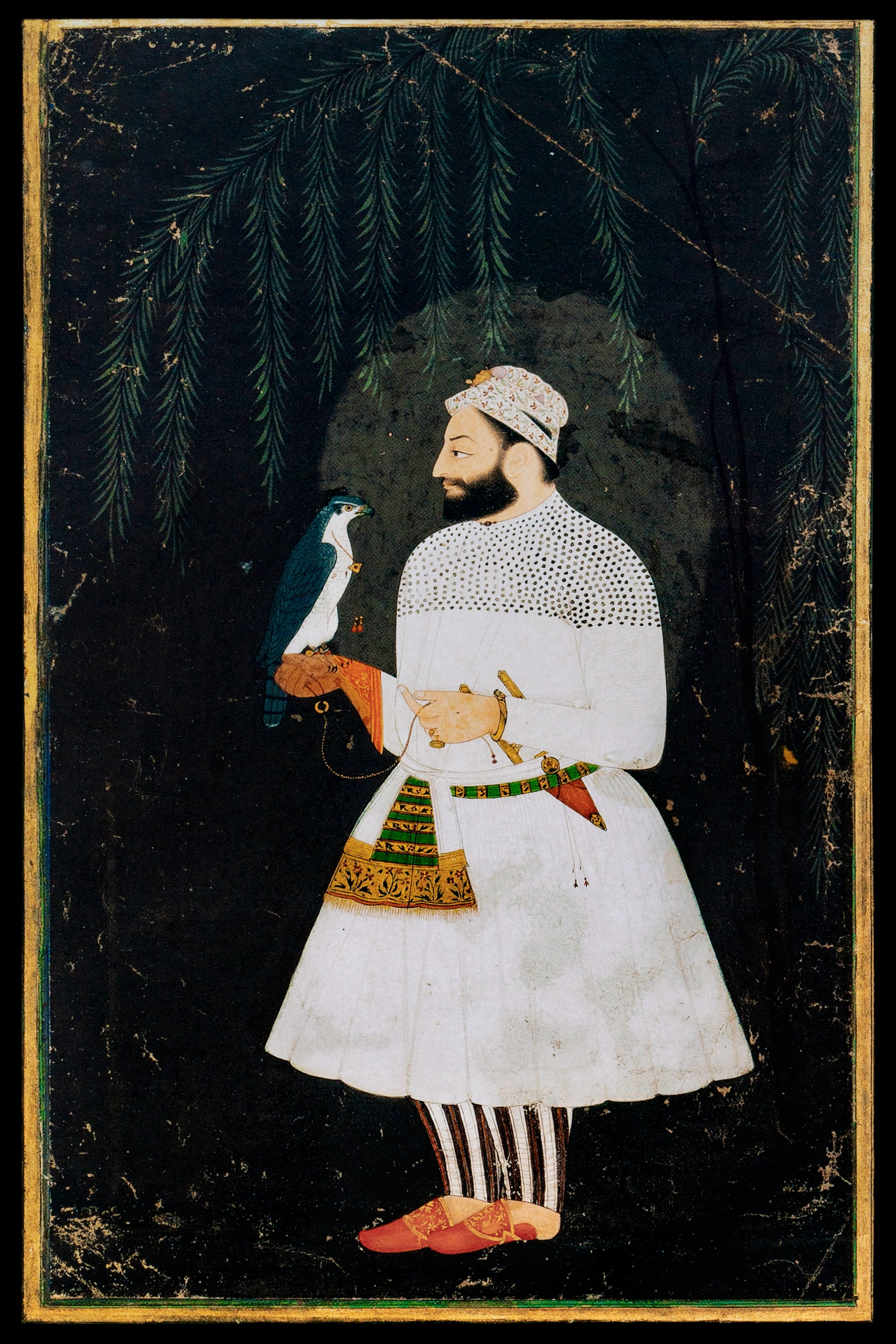
- Contemporary painting of the sixth Sikh guru, Guru Hargobind. Provincial Mughal school, Deccan, mid-17th century

6th Guru of the Sikhs

Personal life
- Born: Hargobind; 5 July 1595 Guru Ki Wadali, Amritsar, Lahore Subah, Mughal Empire (present-day Punjab, India)
- Died: 28 February 1644 (aged 48) Kiratpur Sahib, Lahore Subah, Mughal Empire (present-day Punjab, India)
- Spouse: Mata Nanaki, Mata Damodari, Mata Marvahi, and Mata Kaula
- Children: Baba Gurditta (1613–1638); Baba Suraj Mal (1618–1698); Baba Ani Rai (1633–1678); Baba Atal Rai (1619–1627); Guru Tegh Bahadur (1621–1675); Bibi Veero (1628–1705)
- Parent(s): Guru Arjan and Mata Ganga
- Known for: Building the Akal Takhat; Founder of the Akal Sena; First Guru to engage in warfare; Advising the Sikhs to take part in military training and martial arts; Establish the Miri piri; Founding Kiratpur Sahib and Hargobindpur; Started Gatka, a Sikh martial arts; Supervising the creation of the Taus
- Other names: The Sixth Master; Saccha Paatshah; The Master of Miri Piri; Sixth Nanak; Bandi Chhor
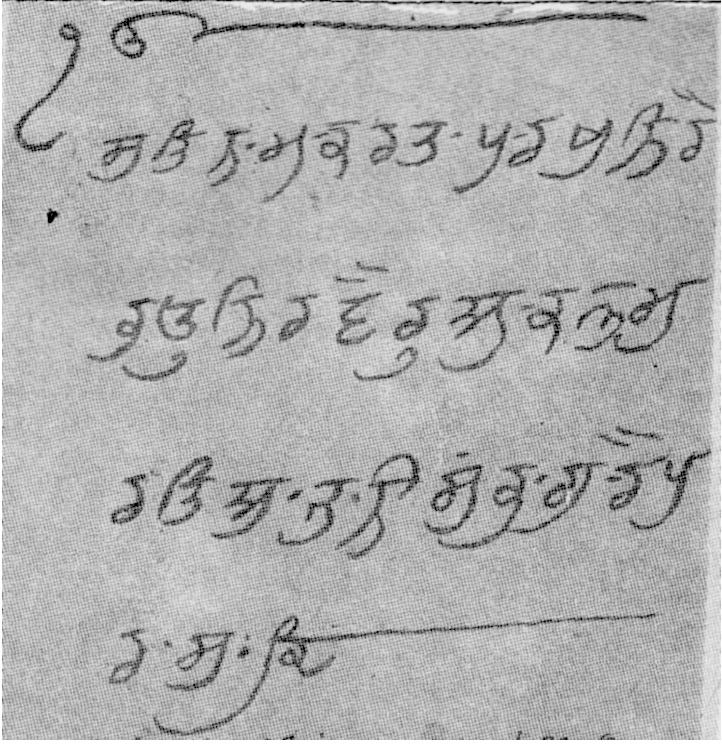
- Signature

Religious life
- Religion: Sikhism

Religious career
- Based in: Amritsar (1606–1628) Kartarpur, Jalandhar district (1628–1634) Kiratpur Sahib (1634–1644)
- Period in office: 1606–1644
- Predecessor: Guru Arjan
- Successor: Guru Har Rai

Military service
- Battles/wars: Wars: Fighting the following battles: Battle of Rohilla, (1621); Battle of Kartarpur, (1635); Battle of Amritsar (1634); Battle of Lahira or Gurusar, (1634); Battle of Kiratpur, (1638); Battle of Sangrana, (1628); Battle of sri Hargobindpur, 1629; Battle of Padiala, 1634; Battle of daroli, 1632; Battle of Palahi, 1635; Battle of Phagwara, 1635; (For detailed list see List of Battles of Guru Hargobind

Guru Hargobind (Gurmukhi: ਗੁਰੂ ਹਰਿਗੋਬਿੰਦ, pronunciation: [gʊɾuː ɦəɾᵊgoːbɪn̯d̯ᵊ]l 19 June 1595 – 28 February 1644) was the sixth of ten Gurus of the Sikh religion. He became Guru at the age of eleven, after the execution of his father, Guru Arjan, by the Mughal emperor Jahangir.

He spent his early life with his father at Ramdaspur (Amritsar), while his tenure as guru involved him residing in Bhai Ki Daroli, Goindwal, Kartarpur (Jalandhar), Hargobindpur, Gwalior, Lahore, and Kiratpur, with travels to Agra, Nanakmatta, Kashmir, and Malwa (Punjab).

Guru Hargobind introduced the process of militarization to Sikhism, likely as a response to his father's execution and to protect the Sikh community. He symbolized it by wearing two swords, representing the dual concept of mīrī and pīrī (temporal power and spiritual authority). In front of the Harmandir Sahib in Amritsar, Hargobind constructed the Akal Takht (the throne of the timeless one). The Akal Takht represents the highest seat of earthly authority of the Khalsa (the collective body of the Sikhs) today.

Amongst his social views, Guru Hargobind considered women to be the consciousness of mankind, promoted the lifestyle of a householder, discouraged asceticism, and promoted marriage as a pathway to self-realization. Beginning in 1606 and ending upon his death in 1644, his guruship was the second longest of all the Sikh gurus, surpassed only by Guru Nanak, whose founding guruship lasted 40 years.

== Early life ==
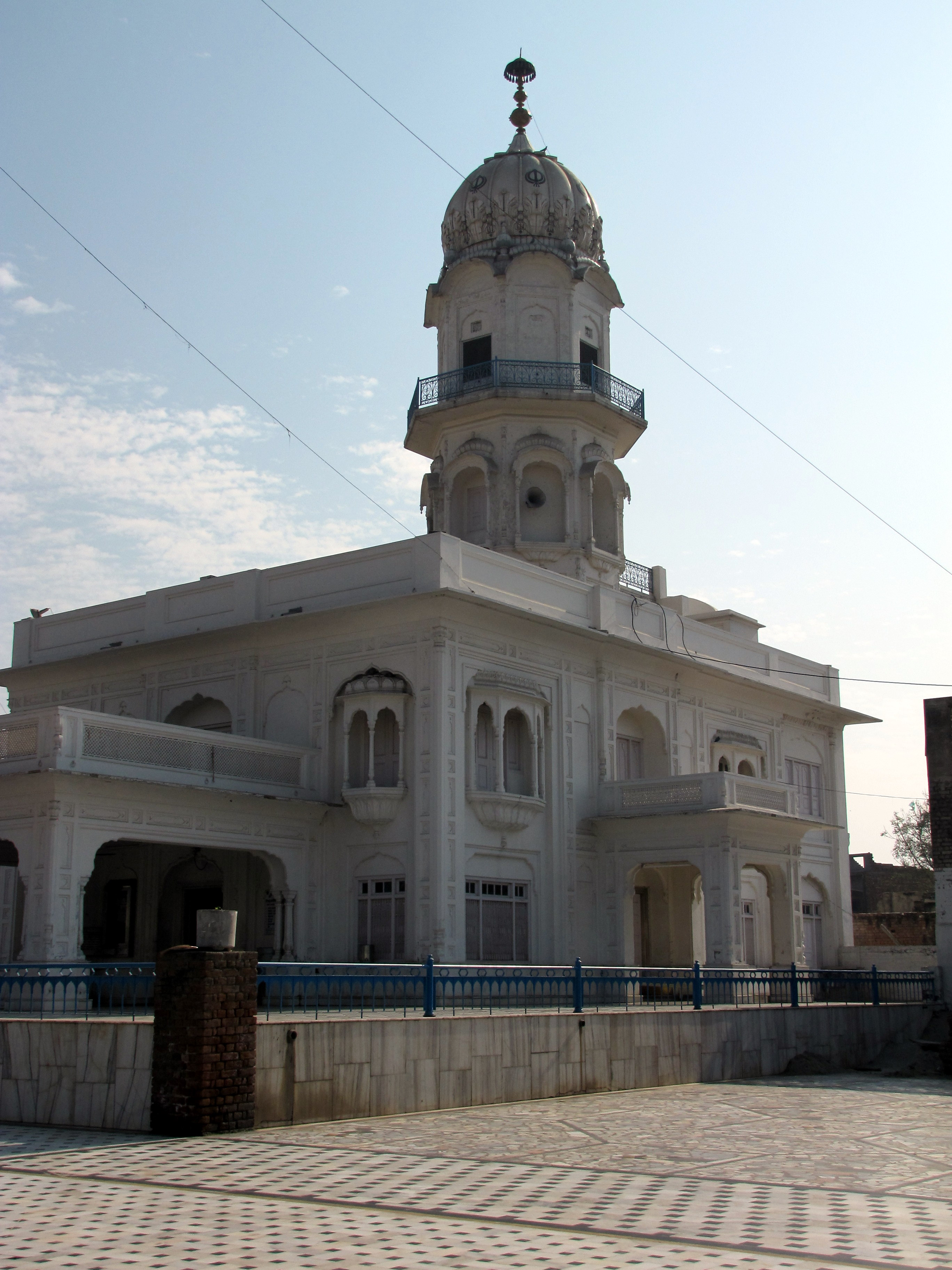
Photograph of Gurdwara Guru Ki Wadali, Amritsar district, which was constructed at the birthplace of Guru Hargobind.

Guru Hargobind was born in Gurū kī Waḍālī, on 19th June of 1595, in a Sodhi Khatri family in a village 7 kilometres (4.3 mi) west of Amritsar, the only son of Guru Arjan, the fifth Sikh Guru. However, Pashaura Singh suggests that he was actually born 19 June 1590. He spent the first sixteen years of his life at Ramdaspur (Amritsar) in the presence of his father.

According to Sikh hagiographies, Guru Hargobind survived two poisoning attempts by his uncle Prithi Chand and his wife, Karmo, as well as another attempt on his life, when a cobra was thrown at him by Prithi Chand. The first poisoning attempt involved Karmo dispatching her personal nurse to pretend to be interested in looking after the child Hargobind. However, the nurse placed poison around her nipple which was to harm Hargobind as he suckled her but the young boy refused to latch onto her and thus the nurse's plan failed and she became ill to the poison herself. The second poisoning plan involved a snake-charmer being sent by Prithi Chand and his wife to assassinate the young Hargobind by releasing a snake onto him but the young boy is said to have grabbed the snake in his hand by its head and squeezed it until it died. A third attempt on his life was by a Brahmin directed again by Prithi Chand and his wife, the Brahmin planned to blend poison with curd and feed the child Hargobind with it but when he attempted to do so, Hargobind knocked the curd out of the Brahmin's grasp and it fell onto the floor, where a dog - named Pista; then ate some of it and died as a result revealing its dangerous contents. The Brahmin then died of abdominal afflictions. He suffered from and survived smallpox as a child. Hargobind grew up to be a "tall and handsome youth".

On 4 November 1598, an eight-year-old Hargobind was a witness to emperor Akbar visiting the Sikh court of his father, which would have an impact on Hargobind's views. Hargobind received an education from Bhai Gurdas and Baba Buddha. Guru Hargobind studied religious texts with Bhai Gurdas and was trained in swordsmanship and archery by Baba Budda. He was also instructed on various languages, religious philosophy, astronomy, medicine, horse-riding, and administration. Hargobind spent a good deal of his early years engrossed in hymns being sung at the Harmandir Sahib complex in Amritsar.

=== Birth year ===
Whilst 1595 is the commonly accepted birth year of the guru, some authors and sources, such as Kesar Singh Chhibar and the Bhat Vahis, record his year of birth as being 1590. According to Pashaura Singh, the Bhatt Vahi Multani Sindhi records the date of birth of Guru Hargobind as 19 June 1590 (asar 21 sambat 1647 in the Bikrami calendar). The sources that affirm the 1595 birth year are the Gurbilas Patshahi Chhevin (possibly 1718), Suraj Prakash (1844), and Naveen Panth Prakash (1880), while the Bansavilinama Dasan Patishahian Ka (1769), Rahitname Ate Ardas, and the Bhatt Bahi Multani Sindhi suggest 1590. Pashaura states that the later works copied Gurbilas Patshahi Chhevin's date of birth assertion. In his work, Pashaura Singh uses 1590 as the year of birth for Guru Hargobind.

== Guruship ==
On 25 May 1606, Guru Arjan, five days before his own death, selected his son Hargobind as his successor and instructed his son to start a military tradition to protect the Sikh people and always keep himself surrounded by armed Sikhs for protection. Shortly afterwards, Arjan was arrested, tortured and killed by order of the Mughal Emperor Jahangir on 30 May 1606. Guru Hargobind's succession ceremony took place on 24 June 1606. He put on two swords: one indicated his spiritual authority (pīrī) and the other, his temporal authority (mīrī). He followed his martyred father's advice and always kept himself surrounded by armed Sikhs for protection. The number fifty-two was special in his life, and his retinue consisted of fifty-two armed men. He thus founded the military tradition in the Sikh faith. Preserved swords belonging to him, the piri tegh and miri tegh, at the Toshakhana in Amritsar contain martial inscriptions. Hargobind had the Akal Takht constructed at Amritsar to represent temporal authority. Rather than replacing the spiritual teachings that had begun with Nanak, Hargobind meant for the new martial teachings to balance out both the spiritual and temporal spheres of life. Guru Hargobind's manner of dressing (regal-style turban with a royal aigrette), keeping an army, being a martial-artist, wearing a martial cummerbund, sponsoring the erection of fortifications, and him engaging in hunts was a symbol of his sovereignty and a challenge of Mughal authority, with the Sikhs referring to the guru as sacha padshah ("true king")

The Guru was a martial artist (shastarvidyā); he encouraged people to maintain physical fitness and keep their bodies ready for physical combat. He had his own Darbar (court). The arming and training of some of his devoted followers began. The Guru came to possess seven hundred horses and his Risaldari (cavalry) grew to three hundred horsemen and sixty musketeers.

As the inheritor of his late father's estate, Guru Hargobind was able to finance his undertakings from the property located in Amritsar, Tarn Taran, Sri Hargobindpur, and Kartarpur. Guru Hargobind also inherited his father's collection of literature, the pothi mahal, with the being a Sikh library tradition consisting of gurbani comparable to the Mughal tradition of kitab-khana. As part of this inheritance, Guru Hargobind received the Goindwal Pothi, with him leaving his autograph on one of its folio to mark its transmission to him. In-addition, the guru kept in his court ragis (musicians), pathis (reciters), and dhadhis (minstrels). Two prominent dhadis of Hargobind were Mir Abdula and Natha, who performed at the Akal Takht.

During the Battle of Amritsar, the pothi mahal (Sikh library) was guarded by the Sikhs. Afterwards, Guru Hargobind would pass on texts, consisting of both gutkas and pothis, that were kept in the pothi mahal to his associates, namely Bhai Rupa, Bidhi Chand, Sri Chand, and a Vanjara Sikh, with all four of these manuscripts being preserved to the present-day.

Regarding his spiritual teachings, Hargobind emphasized the concepts of gurmat (teachings), hukam (divine will), and naam simran (meditation). Guru Hargobind would wake-up in the early hours of the morning and practice naam simran. He also would listen to kirtan performed as chaunkis at the Darbar Sahib in Amritsar. Guru Hargobind made his warriors wear a kachhera (undergarment breeches), kara (wrist-ring), and kirpan (sword).

Hargobind had four wives: Damodari, Nanaki, Marvahi and Kaula. He had children from three wives. Two of his eldest sons from the first wife died during his lifetime. Guru Tegh Bahadur, his son from Nanaki, became the ninth Sikh Guru. The Sodhis of Anandpur Sahib are the descendants of Baba Suraj Mal Sodhi, one of Guru Hargobind's sons.

=== Reforms ===
Guru Hargobind's reforms to the Sikh faith made long-lasting impacts. No longer were the Sikh gurus relegated to spiritual affairs but now they became engaged more deeply in temporal happenings, fusing both the spiritual and temporal spheres together, and furthermore had adopted "regal civility". Hardip Singh Syan explains that Guru Hargobind was able to push for these changes as he became a "patrimonial-feudal lord" by offering his followers and devotees both spiritual liberation (mukti) and employment (naukari). Prior to Hargobind, the Sikh court was popularly seen as offering service (seva) and grace (prasad). This shift did not go without controversy, with Bhai Gurdas recording in his writings the tensions within the Sikh community at the time regarding these reforms, with Gurdas highlighting that keeping the guru as the main point of one's faith was key.

The previous Gurus used to sit at one temple (dharmsal);
But this Guru [Hargobind] roams from place to place.
Kings (patisah) used to visit the homes of the previous Gurus;
But this Guru was imprisoned in the Emperor's fort.
The previous Gurus used to make congregations flourish;
But this Guru roams the land without any fear.
The previous Gurus used to sit on their beds and bestow contentment;
But this Guru keeps dogs for the hunt.
The previous Guru's used to listen, sing and explain;
But this Guru neither listens, nor sings or explains.
This Guru does not keep close to his servants (sevak);
Rather he gives favour to liars and evildoers.
[Gurdas' reply] The inherent truth (sach) cannot be concealed;
The disciples (Sikh) [knowing this] like bees adore the lotus feet.
The impatient are unknowingly being made to endure [these reforms].

— Bhai Gurdas, translated in 'Sikh Militancy in the Seventeenth Century: Religious Violence in Mughal and Early Modern India' by Hardip Singh Syal, page 57

=== Relations with other rulers ===
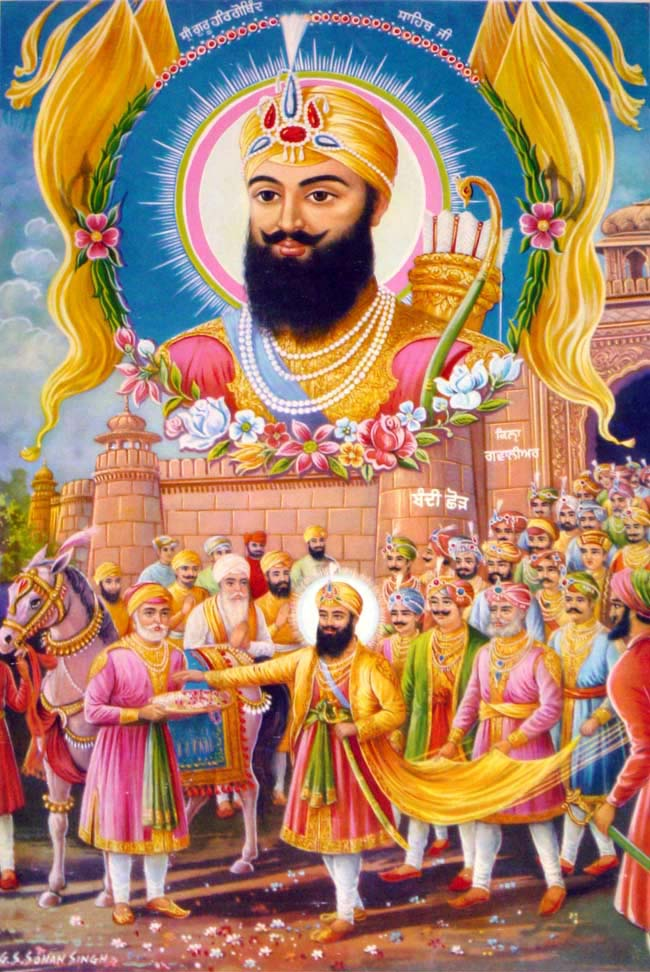
Guru Hargobind is released from Gwalior Fort by Jahangir's order

Guru Hargobind led the Sikh response against Mughal power after Guru Arjan's execution. He nominally accepted Shah Jahan's authority but resisted the Islamic persecution, fighting four wars against Shah Jahan's armies. His attempts to transform the Sikh community brought him in conflict with the Mughal authority.

Sikh beliefs hold that Guru Hargobind secured the release of fifty-two Rajput hill rajas during his exiting from internment at Gwalior Fort, an event that is celebrated on Diwali as Bandi Chhor Divas by Sikhs.

==== Jahangir ====
Along with the execution of Guru Arjan Dev by the Mughal Emperor Jahangir, Guru Hargobind from the very start was a dedicated enemy of the Mughal rule. He advised Sikhs to arm and fight the Mughals. The death of his father at the hands of Jahangir prompted him to emphasize the military dimension of the Sikh community. He symbolically wore two swords, which represented miri piri. He founded the Akal Sena, the first Sikh army. He built a fort to defend Ramdaspur and created a formal court, Akal Takht.

Jahangir responded by jailing the 14-year-old Guru Hargobind at Gwalior Fort in 1609, on the pretext that the fine imposed on Guru Arjan had not been paid by the Sikhs and Hargobind. It is not clear as to how much time he spent as a prisoner. The year of his release appears to have been either 1611 or 1612, when Hargobind was about 16 years old. Persian records, such as Dabestan-e Mazaheb suggest he was kept in jail for twelve years, including over 1617–1619 in Gwalior, after which he and his camp were kept under Mughal army's surveillance by Jahangir.

It is unclear why he was released. Scholars suggest that Jahangir had more or less reverted to tolerant policies of Akbar by about 1611 after he felt secure about his throne, and the Sunnis and Naqshbandi court officials at the Mughal court had fallen out of his favour. Another theory states that Jahangir discovered the circumstances and felt that Guru Hargobind was harmless, so he ordered his release.

According to Surjit Singh Gandhi, 52 rajas (kings) who were imprisoned in the fort as hostages for "millions of rupees" and for opposing the Mughal empire were dismayed as they were losing a spiritual mentor. Guru Hargobind requested the rajas to be freed along with him as well and stood surety for their loyal behavior. Jahangir ordered their release as well. Hargobind got a special gown stitched which had 52 hems. As Hargobind left the fort, the captive kings caught the hems of the cloak and came out along with him.

After his release, Guru Hargobind more discreetly strengthened the Sikh army and reconsolidated the Sikh community. His relations with Jahangir remained mostly friendly. He accompanied Jahangir to Kashmir and Rajputana and subdued Tara Chand of Nalagarh, who had continued for a long time in open rebellion and all efforts to subdue him had failed. During Jahangir's reign, Hargobind fought a battle against the Mughals at Rohilla. The battle was in response to the militarisation of the Sikhs. The Mughals who were led by Governor Abdul Khan were defeated by the Sikhs.

==== Shah Jahan ====
During the reign of Jahangir's son and successor Shah Jahan that started in 1627, relations became bitter again. Shah Jahan was intolerant. He destroyed the Sikh stepwell at Lahore. In 1628, Shah Jahan's hunting party plundered some of Guru Hargobind's property, which triggered the first armed conflict.

Hargobind's army fought battles with the Mughal armies of Shah Jahan at Amritsar, Kartarpur and elsewhere. Hargobind defeated the Mughal troops near Amritsar in the Battle of Amritsar in 1634. A provincial detachment of Mughals again attacked the Guru, but the attackers were routed and their leaders slain. Guru Hargobind also led his armies against the provincial Mughal governors. The Guru anticipated the return of a more significant Mughal force, so retreated into Shivalik Hills to strengthen his defenses and army, with a base in Kiratpur where he continued to stay till his death.

Painde Khan was appointed the leader of the provincial troops by Shah Jahan and marched upon the Guru. Hargobind was attacked, but he won this battle as well. He also fought the Battle of Kartarpur. Chandu Shah, who had ordered Guru Arjan's death, was killed through torture by the Sikhs of Guru Hargobind: a thick iron ring was put around his nose and he was dragged on the floor until the man who tortured Arjan, and had since become a Sikh, poured hot sand on him from the same ladle used on Arjan.

Guru Hargobind lost his eldest son Baba Gurditta in 1638. Shah Jahan attempted political means to undermine the Sikh tradition by dividing and influencing the succession. The Mughal ruler gave land grants to Gurditta's eldest son Dhir Mal, living in Kartarpur, and attempted to encourage Sikhs to recognise Dhir Mal as the rightful successor to Hargobind. Dhir Mal issued statements in favour of the Mughal state and critical of his grandfather. Hargobind died at Kiratpur, Rupnagar, Punjab, on 28 February 1644. Before his death, he rejected his eldest grandson Dhir Mal's politics and nominated Guru Har Rai (Dhir Mal's younger brother) instead to succeed him as the Guru. The pattern was repeated when Guru Har Rai chose his second son as his successor instead of his eldest son.

==== Samarth Ramdas and Guru Hargobind ====
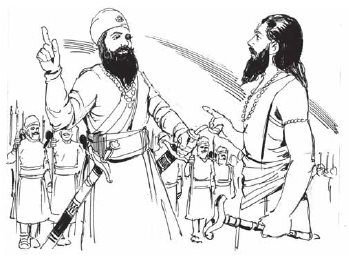
Guru Hargobind and Samarth Ramdas

According to Sikh tradition based on an old Punjabi manuscript Panjah Sakhian, Samarth Ramdas met Guru Hargobind at Srinagar in the Garhval hills. The meeting, corroborated in a Marathi source, Ramdas's Bakhar, by Hanumant Swami, written in 1793, probably took place in the early 1630s during Samarth Ramdas's pilgrimage travels in the north and Hargobind's journey to Nanakmata in the east. It is said that as they came face to face with each other, Hargobind had just returned from a hunting excursion. He was fully armed and rode a horse. "I had heard that you occupied the Gaddi of Guru Nanak", said the Maratha saint Ramdas, and asked what sort of sadhu was he. Hargobind replied, "Internally a hermit, and externally a prince. Arms mean protection to the poor and destruction of the tyrant. Guru Nanak had not renounced the world but had renounced Maya".

== Marriages ==
Guru Hargobind had multiple wives, who are as follows:

- Mata Damodari (1597 – 13 July 1631), married on 15 February 1605, who birthed Baba Gurditta (b. 1613) and Bibi Viro (b. 1615)
- Mata Marvahi/Mahadevi (died 1645), married on 7 July 1615, who birthed Suraj Mal (b. 1617)
- Mata Nanaki (d. 1678), married in April 1613, who birthed Ani Rai (b. 1618), Atal Rai (b. 1619), and Guru Tegh Bahadur (b. 1621)

== Death ==
He nominated his grandson, Guru Har Rai, to succeed him. He died in 1644 at Kiratpur Sahib, a town on the banks of the River Sutlej, and was cremated on the banks of the river, where now stands Gurdwara Patalpuri Sahib.

== Sectarian views ==
Guru Hargobind's reforms also had an impact on the Minas, a sect that rose to become a major opponent of the mainstream lineage of Sikh gurus. Prior to Guru Hargobind's reign, the Mina literature emulated the writings and appearances of the previous five gurus in-style, whilst portraying themselves as spiritually superior. However, Guru Hargobind conducted himself very differently from the previous gurus, thus the Minas were not able to emulate his ethos, and therefore relegated to keep mirroring the environment of the pre-Guru Hargobind Sikh court. Therefore, the Minas attempted to portray themselves as being the preservers of the original bhakti of the Sikh faith, whilst portraying as a result that Guru Hargobind had somehow deviated from the path of original Sikh values and sociopolitical thought.

== Literature ==
Guru Hargoind is not held in the Sikh tradition to have composed any poetry of his own, unlike his predecessors. However, two letters (hukamnamas) written in prose are attributed to him. In his letters, he stressed upon the name of kartar (creator) for naam simran. Manuscripts of the Sikh scriptures were prepared during his guruship and he advocated that the Sikhs prepare their own gurbani pothis.

== Battles and skirmishes ==
1. Battle of Sangrana (1628)
2. Battle of sri Hargobindpur, 1629
3. Battle of Rohilla (1630)
4. Battle of Amritsar (1634)
5. Battle of Lahira, 1634
6. Siege of Brahman Majra, 1634
7. Skirmish of Gumtala, 1634
8. Battle of Padiala, 1634
9. Battle of daroli, 1632
10. Battle of Kiratpur, 1638
11. Battle of Kartarpur, 1635
12. Battle of Phagwara, 1635

== Popular culture ==
The animated Punjabi movie Dastaan-E-Miri Piri (ਦਸਤਾਨ-ਏ-ਮੀਰੀ ਪੀਰੀ) is about Guru Hargobind and his contribution to the Sikh faith and community.

The life story and teachings of Guru Hargobind influenced the 2023 season theme and artwork of the Dallas Cowboys football team.

== Gallery ==
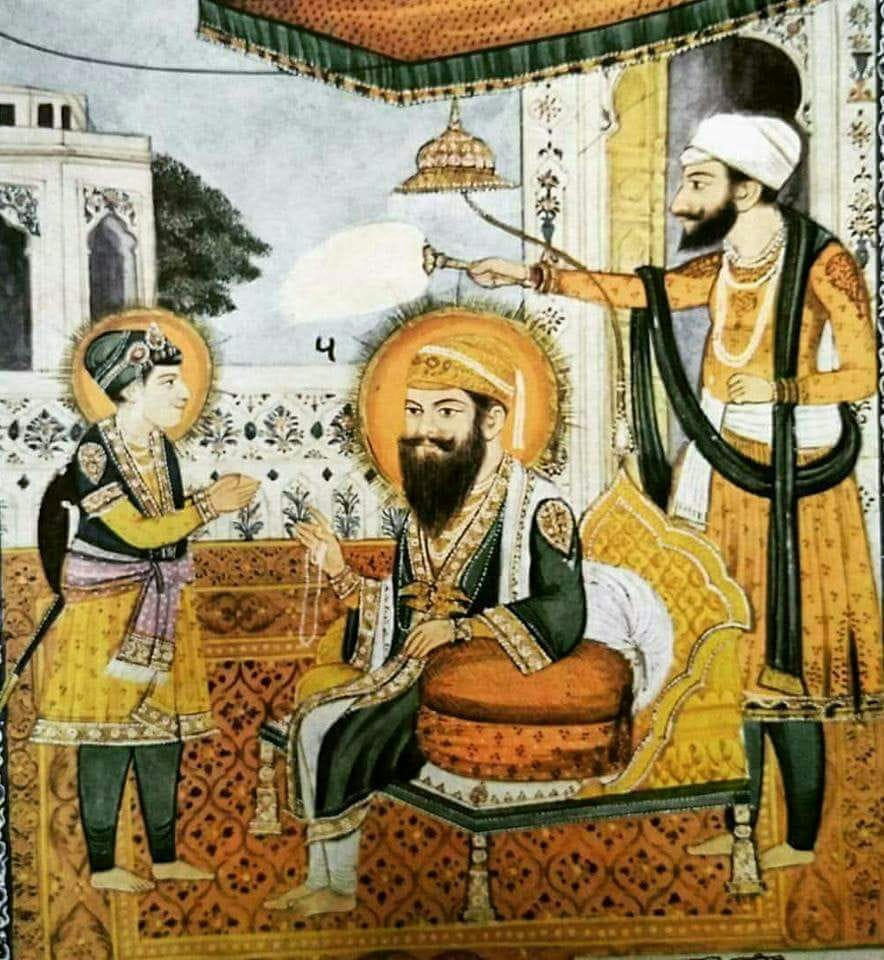
Guru Arjan (seated, middle) with a young Hargobind (left).

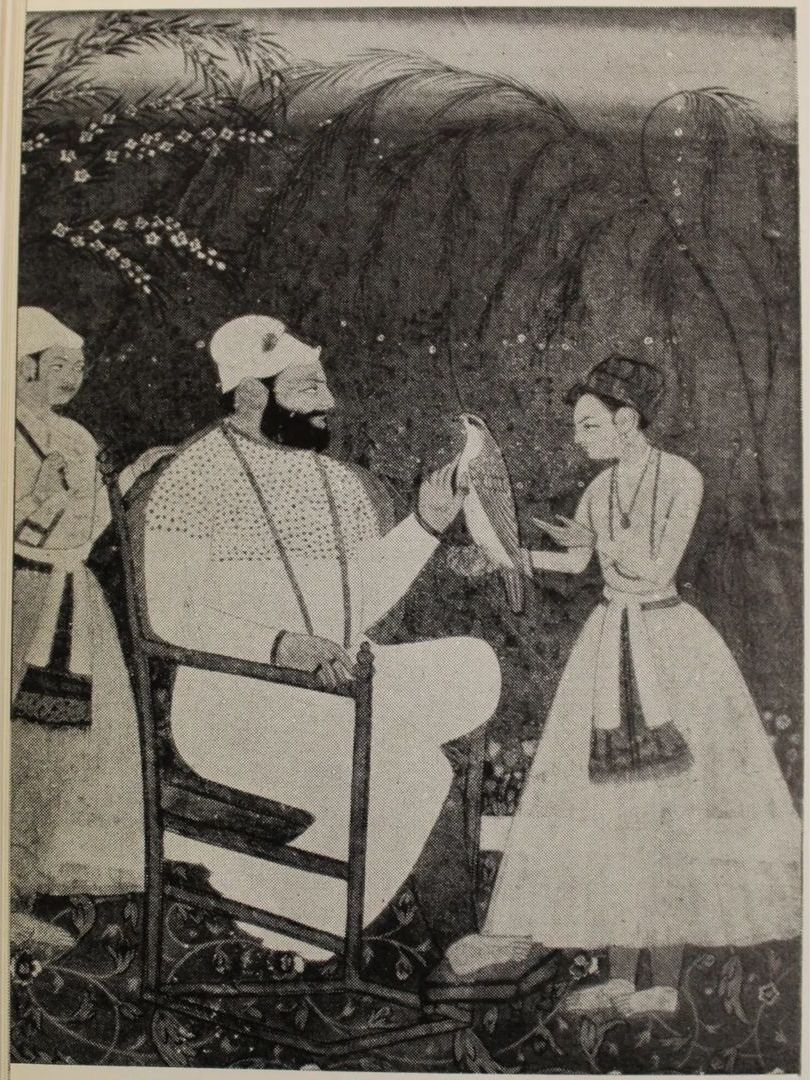
Guru Hargobind depicted alongside Ani Rai and Atal Rai.

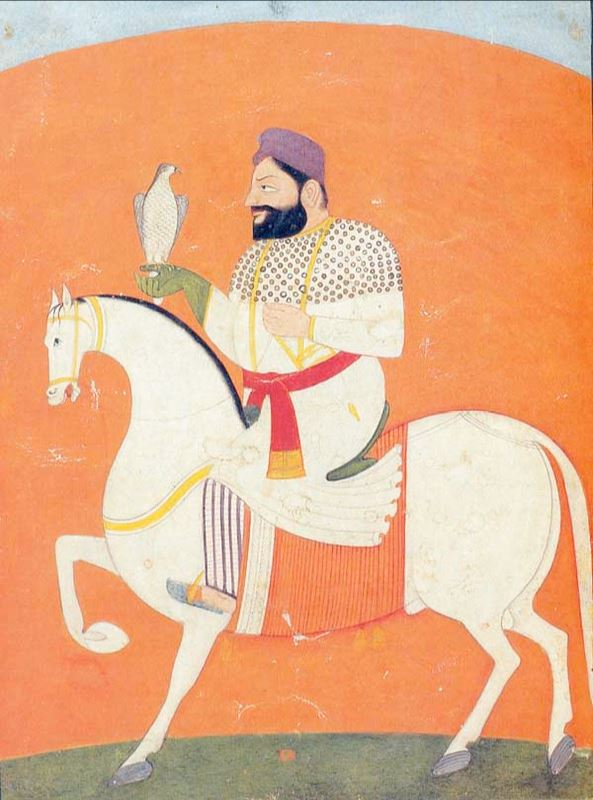
Guru Hargobind out riding.

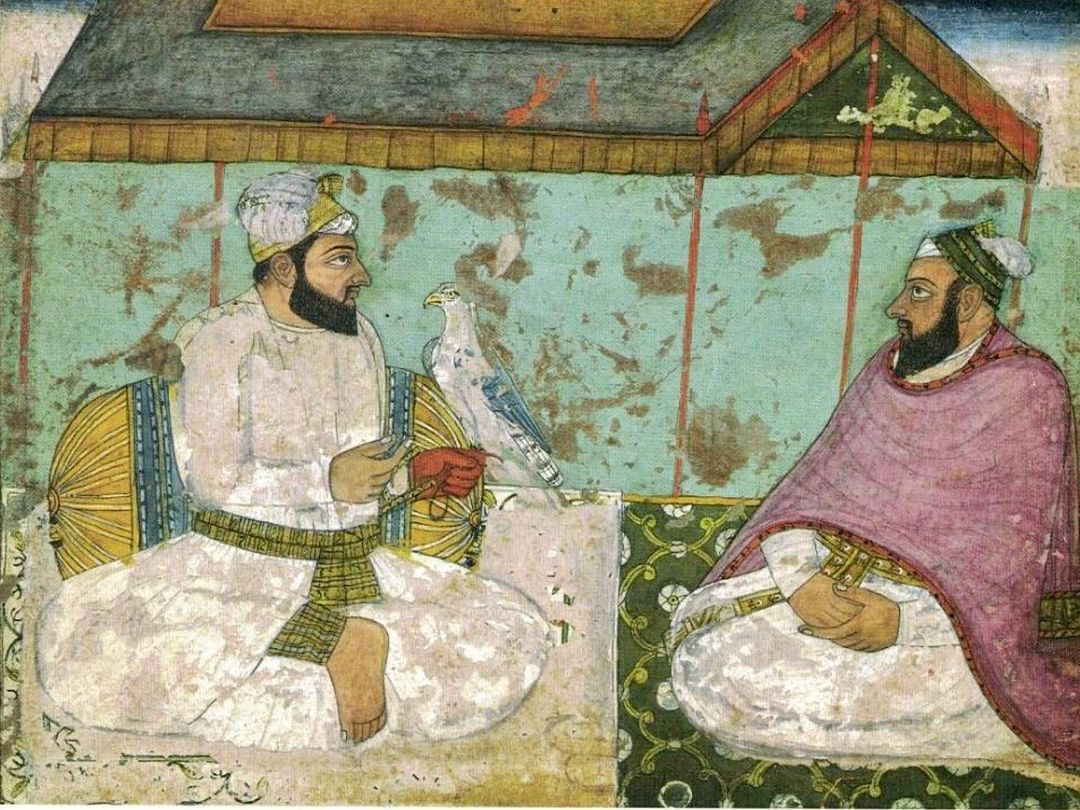
Bhai Rupa Chand (right) with Guru Hargobind (left).

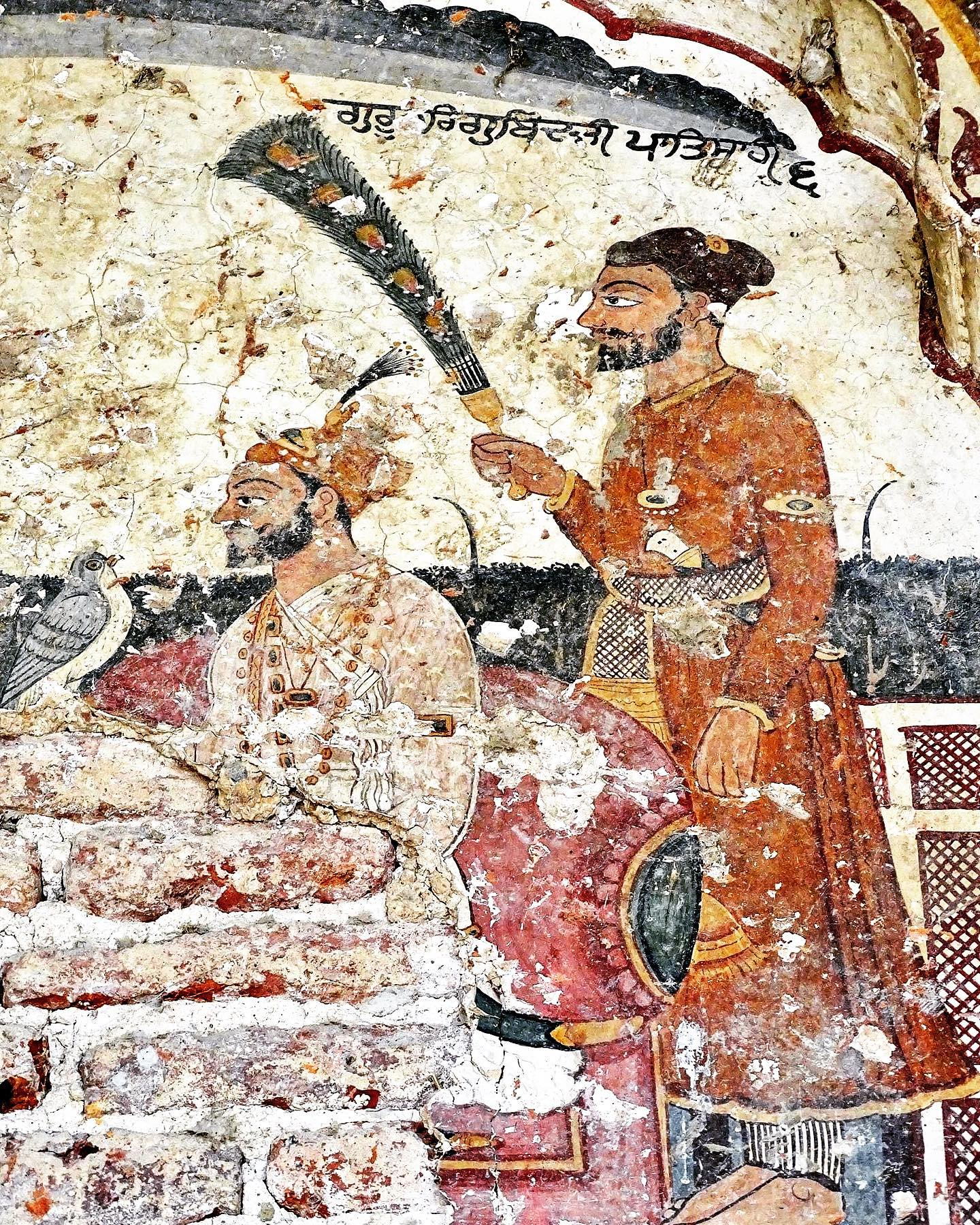
Fresco artwork of Guru Hargobind (seated).

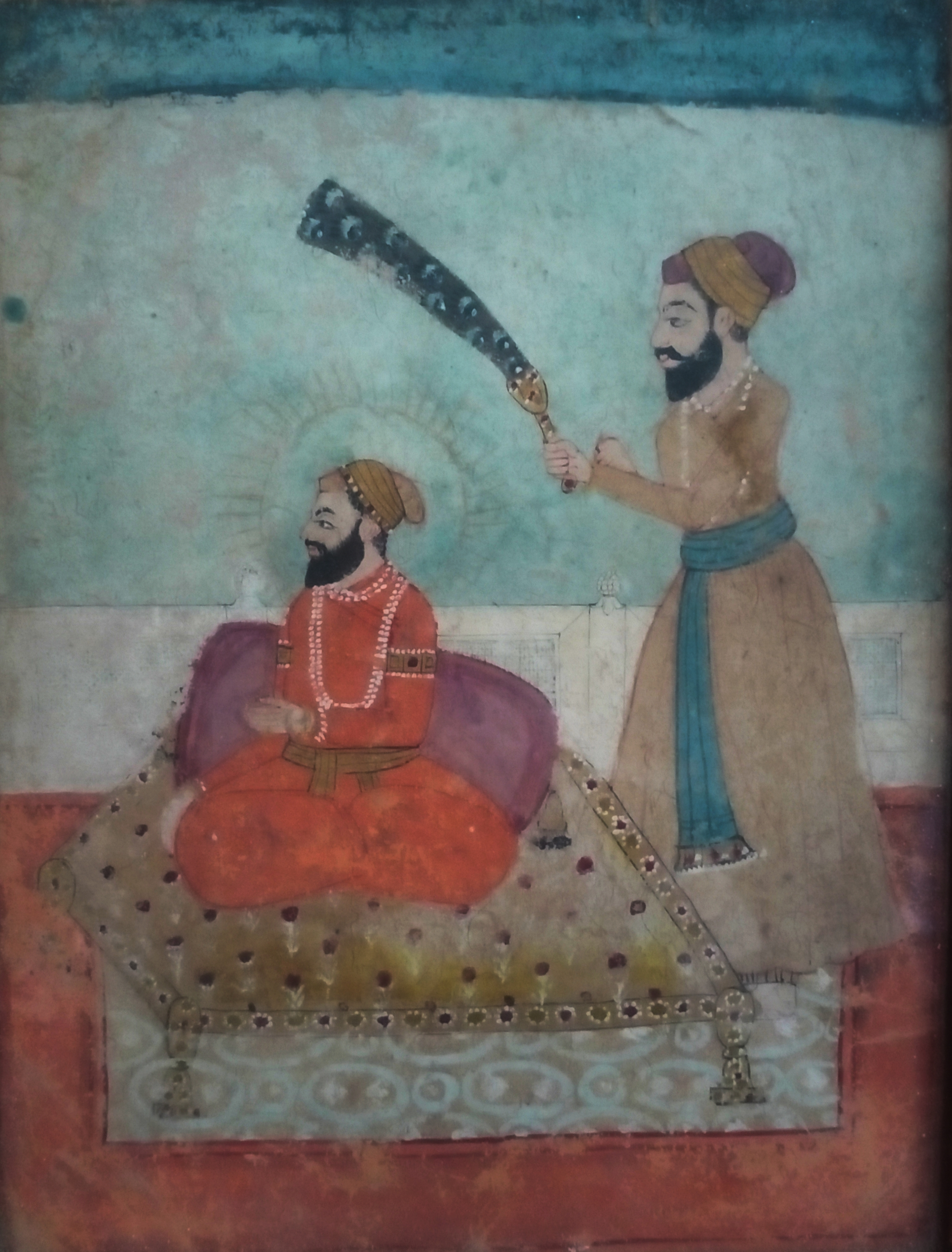
Ancient Painting of Guru Hargobind

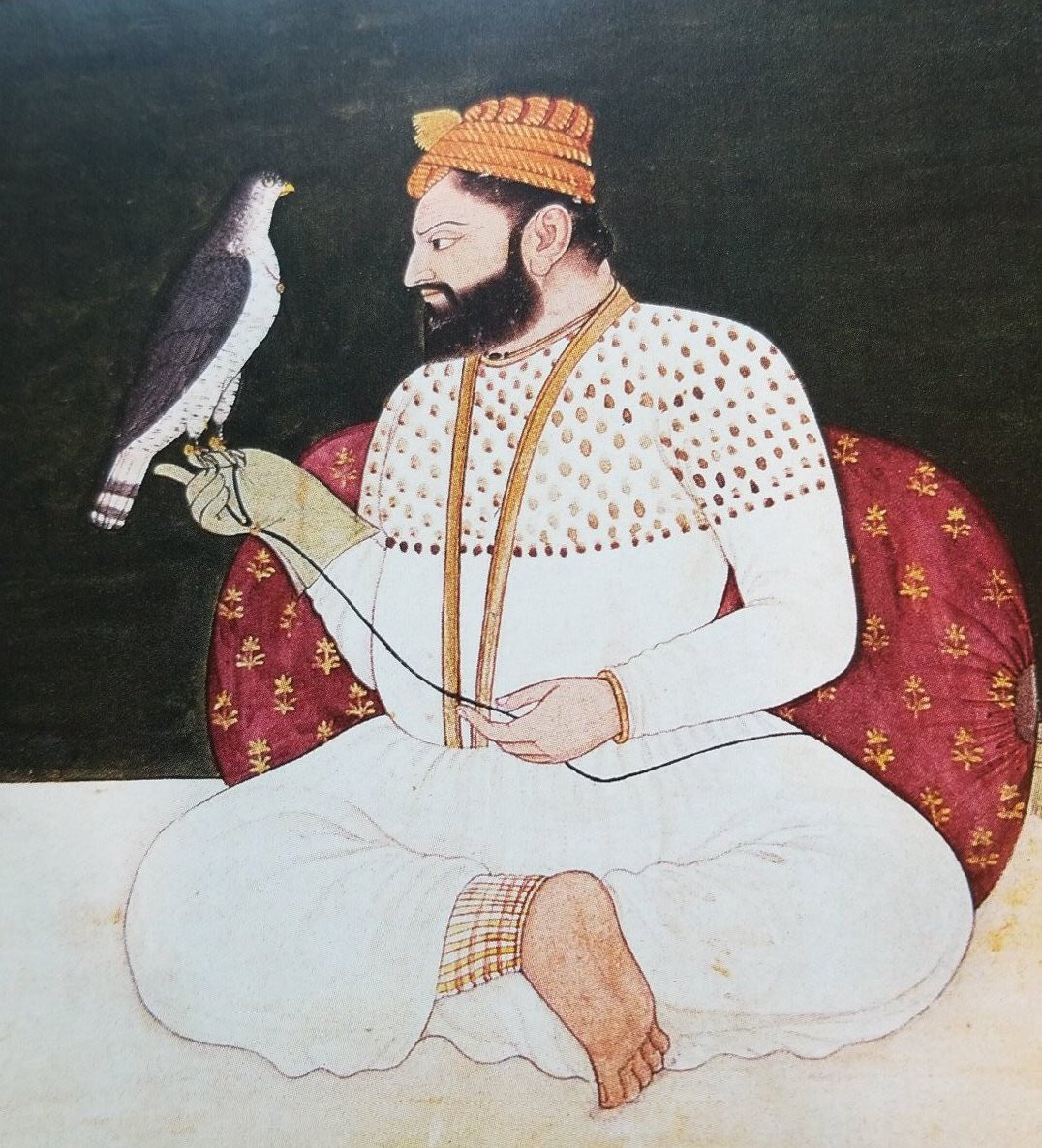
Mid-17th century portrait of Guru Hargobind holding a bird of prey

== See also ==
- Mata Kaulan
- Akal Sena
- Dilbagh and Gulbagh

Preceded by Guru Arjan	Sikh Guru; 25 May 1606 – 3 March 1644	Succeeded by Guru Har Rai
