= Dilbagh and Gulbagh =

Horses of Guru Hargobind

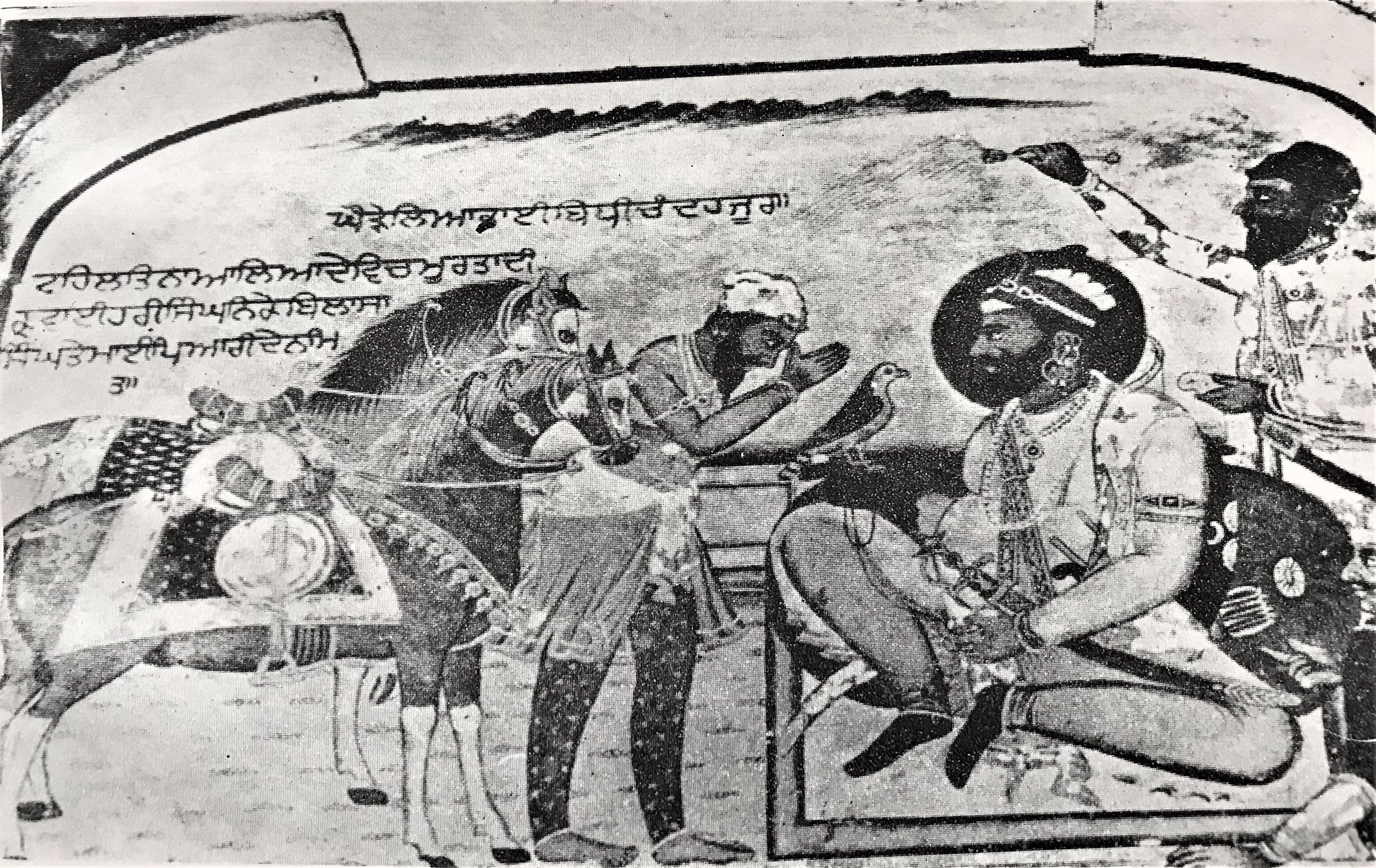
Bhai Bidhi Chand giving Dilbagh and Gulbagh to Guru Hargobind (19th century fresco)

Dilbagh and Gulbagh, later renamed Jan Bhai and Suhela, were two horses that were associated with the sixth Sikh guru, Guru Hargobind.

== Names ==
The name Dilbagh means "heart's happiness" whilst Gulbagh means "flower of happiness". They were later renamed Jan Bhai, meaning "as dear as life", and Suhela, meaning "a dear friend".

== Description ==
Dilbagh and Gulbagh were both Iraqi horses. Dilbagh and Gulbagh were both white in-colour.

== History ==
A Sikh sakhi (anecdote) says two horses, which had been forcibly taken from the Sikhs by the Mughals, were recaptured by Bidhi Chand. The horses had been seized by Mughal officials of Lahore, as the owner, a Sikh who had raised and trained them, was bringing them from Kabul as an offering for the Guru in the company of two masands, Tara Chand and Bakht Mal, who had been dispatched to the local Sikh congregation of Kabul. The horses were specifically seized upon the orders of the Mughal chief of Lahore city, Qasim Beg, for the purpose of taking them for the royal Mughal stable. Another account says the name of the Mughal official who seized the horses was Khalil Beg.

Bidhi Chand was chosen as the best choice for the mission to recapture the prized horses, named Dilbagh and Gulbagh, from the hands of the Mughal emperor Shah Jahan. Bidhi Chand accomplished this task by becoming employed at the stable of the Lahore Fort where the horses were kept as the worker who brought the horses fresh grass to feed to the horses and their personal groomer, he used a false name of "Kasera" while he worked there. He stayed at the residence of a local Sikh named Jiwan during the time of his employment and he refused to accept the pay he was afforded by the officials. He eventually won the trust of the officials who were in-charge of guarding the fort after being employed there for some time. Every night, he would desensitize the guards to sounds coming from the Ravi River by throwing large rocks into it and tell them it was just a large animal, to mask his coming plan. Later on, he managed to escape with one of the horses, Dilbagh, by jumping into the Ravi River (whose course at that time flowed near the fort) at night when the guards were sound asleep after being fed a large feast under the patronage of Bidhi Chand on his payday. He brought the horse back to the encampment of the Guru.

However, this was only one of the horses, Dilbagh, and he still had to capture the other, Gulbagh. He returned to Lahore and was assisted by a local Sikh named Bhai Bohru. He managed to escape with the other horse by fooling the official caretaker of the horses, Sondha Khan, by disguising himself and pretending to be an astrologer investigating the disappearance of the first horse (which he had actually been the one who had stolen it). The horses were renamed by the Sikhs, with Dilbagh being renamed as Jan Bhai (meaning "as dear to life") and Gulbagh being renamed as Suhela (meaning "dear companion").

After the rescue of the horses, the Guru famously proclaimed: "Bidhichand Chhinā Guru ka Sīnā. Prem bhagat linā. Kade kami nān." (meaning: "Bidhi Chand Chhina is very near to Guru's heart. He is a lovable devotee. He will never suffer from want.")

== Popular culture ==
A fresco of the horses in the Akal Takht in the Golden Temple was destroyed following the reconstruction of the site in the 1980s.

== Gallery ==
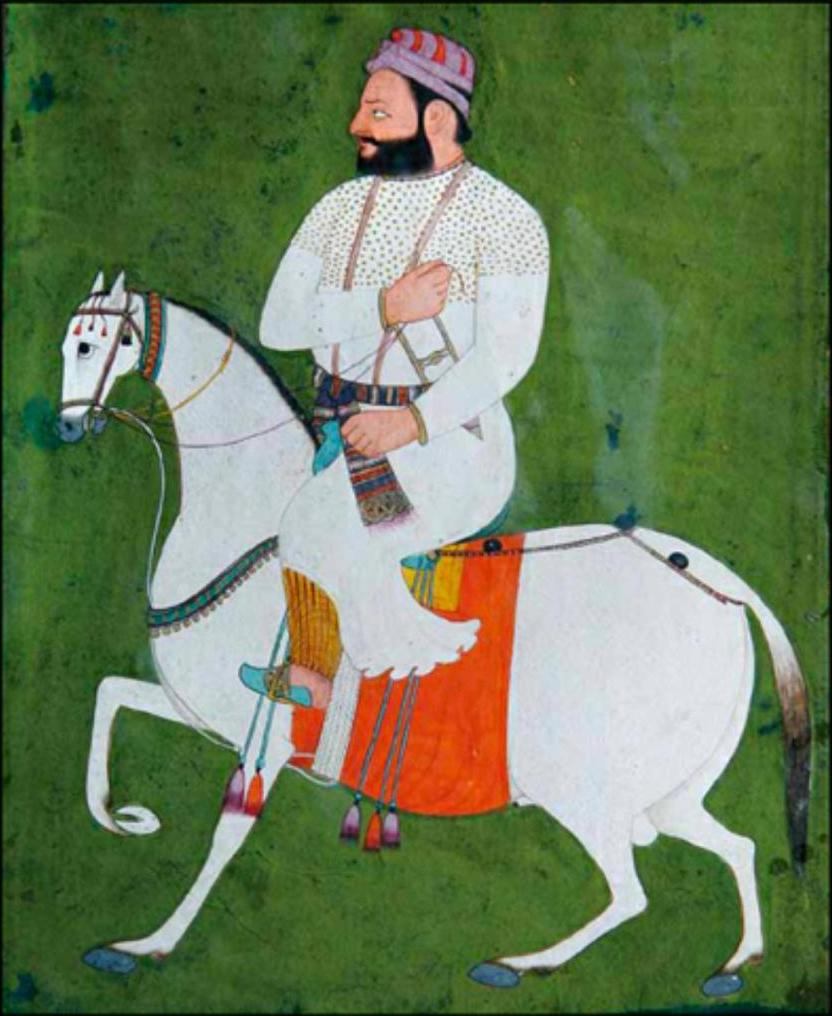
Equestrian painting of Guru Hargobind on horseback, held by the lineage of Bidhi Chand located at Sursingh, circa mid-17th century

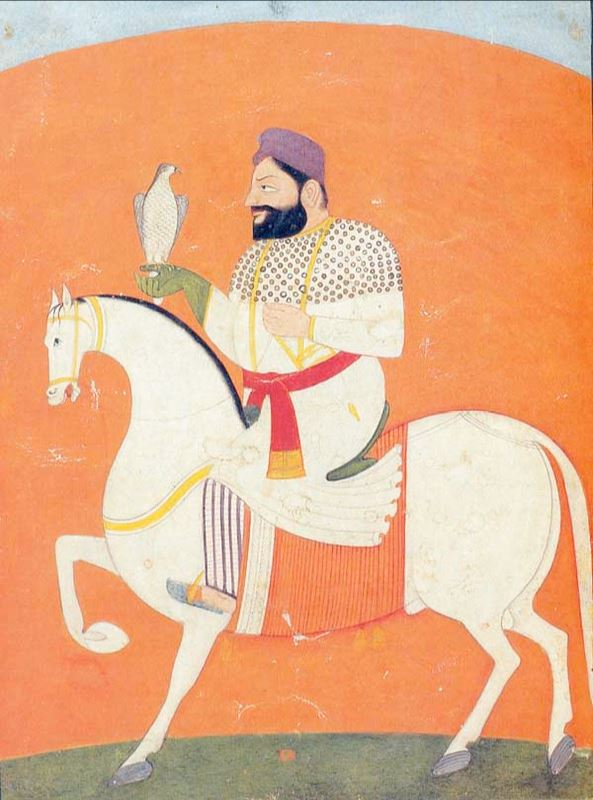
Contemporary equestrian painting of Guru Hargobind with an orange-coloured backdrop, held in the collection of the Sodhi family of Kartarpur, circa mid-17th century

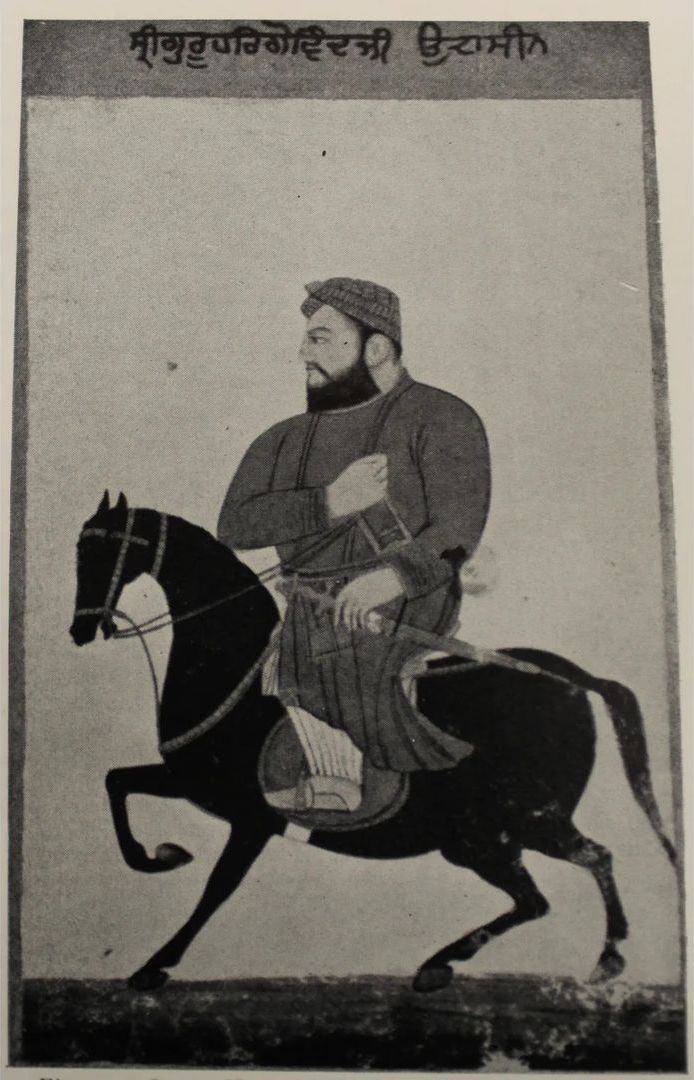
Equestrian portrait of Guru Hargobind, held in the collection of the mahant of the Ram Rai Darbar complex in Dehradun, ca.1685
