= Mata Nanaki =

Wife of Guru Hargobind

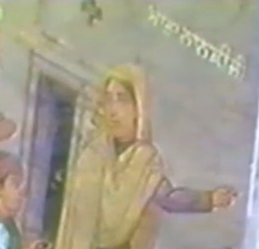
- Detail of a fresco depicting Mata Nanaki from Gurdwara Baba Bakala

Personal life
- Born: 1598
- Died: 1678 (aged 79–80)
- Spouse: Guru Hargobind
- Children: Guru Tegh Bahadur
- Parents: Hari Chand (father); Hardei (mother)

Religious life
- Religion: Sikhism

Mata Nanaki (1598–1678), alternatively spelt as Mata Nanki or with the prefix Bibi/Bebe, was the wife of the sixth Sikh guru, Guru Hargobind and the mother of Guru Tegh Bahadur, the ninth Sikh guru.

== Biography ==
Mata Nanki was the daughter of Hari Chand and Hardei, a Khatri couple of the village of Bakala in present-day Amritsar district. She was born in Amritsar and married to Guru Hargobind in April 1613. Some narrations of the tale of Makhan Shah Labana state that he met Mata Nanaki when searching for the successor of Guru Har Krishan at Baba Bakala. After her son was bestowed the guruship, the family moved to the Shivalik foothills where a locality was founded by her son, named Chakk Nanaki after his mother (now known as Anandpur). She accompanied her son through his journey through the Malwa region and what is now Uttar Pradesh to visit old congregations of Sikhs. She witnessed the severed head of her martyred son, Guru Tegh Bahadur, and accepted it as the will of God and was consoled by Guru Gobind Singh. She continued to serve the community till her death in 1678.

== Children ==
Mata Nanaki gave birth to Ani Rai (b. 1618), Atal Rai (b. 1619), and Guru Tegh Bahadur (b. 1621).
