= Malakpur =

- Village
- Location in Punjab, India Malakpur (India)
- Coordinates: 30.9294706°N 75.7199403°E
- Country: India
- State: Punjab
- District: Ludhiana
- Tehsil: Ludhiana West

Government
  - Type: Panchayati raj (India)
  - Body: Gram panchayat

Languages
  - Official: Punjabi
  - Other spoken: Hindi
- Time zone: UTC+5:30 (IST)
- Telephone code: 0161
- ISO 3166 code: IN-PB
- Vehicle registration: PB-10
- Website: ludhiana.nic.in

Malakpur is a village located in the Ludhiana West Tehsil, of Ludhiana district, Punjab.

== Administration ==
The village is administrated by a Sarpanch who is an elected representative of village as per constitution of India and Panchayati raj (India).

Particulars	Total	Male	Female
Total No. of Houses	318		
Population	1,754	910	844

== Air travel connectivity ==
The closest airport to the village is Sahnewal Airport.
