= Battle of Rohilla =

Military Campaign

- Part of Early Mughal-Sikh Wars
Date	4 October,1621
Location	Northeast of Amritsar at Rohilla (later named Hargobindpur)
Result	Sikh victory

Belligerents
Akal Sena (Sikhs)	Mughal Empire

Commanders and leaders
Jattu †	Abdul Khan †; Karam Chand †; Ratan Chand †

Units involved
Unknown	4,000

Casualties and losses
Unknown	Unknown

The Battle of Rohilla, also known as the Battle of Hargobindpur, was a 1621 campaign by the Mughal Empire against the growing influence of the Sikhs. The battle was fought on 4 October 1621 (3 Kattak 1678 Bk).

After the execution of Guru Arjan Dev, Guru Hargobind fully militarized the Sikhs into a proper militia mostly based on an irregular cavalry style of warfare. In 1621, Hargobind envisaged a plan to develop a town, Sri Hargobindpur, that was founded by his father. A dispute over the possession of land and plans to erect a building ensued between the Guru and a Khatri Chaudhary named Bhagwan Das. Accordingly, Bhagwan Das attacked the Guru's camp and was subsequently killed in the fight. Das' son, Rattan Chand, and Karam Chand, the son of Chandu Shah (an antipathetic figure in Sikh tradition), forged an alliance and incited the Faujdar of Jalandhar, Abdul Khan, to send an expedition against Guru Hargobind. The Sikhs fought and defeated the contingent of 4,000 Mughal troops sent by Abdul Khan, near the Beas River. The Sikh force's commander Jattu as well as Abdul Khan, Rattan Chand and Karam Chand were killed in the fighting.
