= Akal Sena =

First standing Sikh army created by Guru Hargobind (1606 – 1699)

- ਅਕਾਲ ਸੈਨਾ
- Reconstructed Flag of the Akal Sena of a Kattar push-dagger and overlaid Dhal shield as depicted in a mural from Gurdwara Chhevin Patshahi in Hadiara, Lahore district showcasing the Akal Dhuja flag of the Akal Sena during the time of Guru Hargobind
- Active: 15 June 1606 – 13 April 1699
- Allegiance: Sikh Gurus
- Branch: Akali-Nihang; Pathan regiment Risaldari (cavalry)
- Type: Policing (1606 – 1612); Army (1612 – 1699)
- Headquarters: Akal Bunga, Amritsar
- Colors: Yellow (during/after the tenure of Guru Hargobind Sahib); Navy (during the tenure of Guru Gobind Singh)
- Wars: Early Mughal-Sikh Wars; Mughal war of succession (1658–1659); Ahom–Mughal conflicts

Commanders
- Gurus: Guru Hargobind (1606 – 1644); Guru Har Rai (1644 – 1661); Guru Har Krishan (1661 – 1664); Guru Tegh Bahadur (1664 – 1675); Guru Gobind Singh (1675 – 1699)
- Commanders: Bidhi Chand Chhina; Bhai Gaura; Baba Praga; Bhai Jattu; Bhai Peda; Bhai Langah; Bhai Jati Mall; Bhai Lakhi; Rai Jodh; Baba Gurditta; Painde Khan (later defected to the Mughals)
- Successor: Khalsa Fauj

Insignia
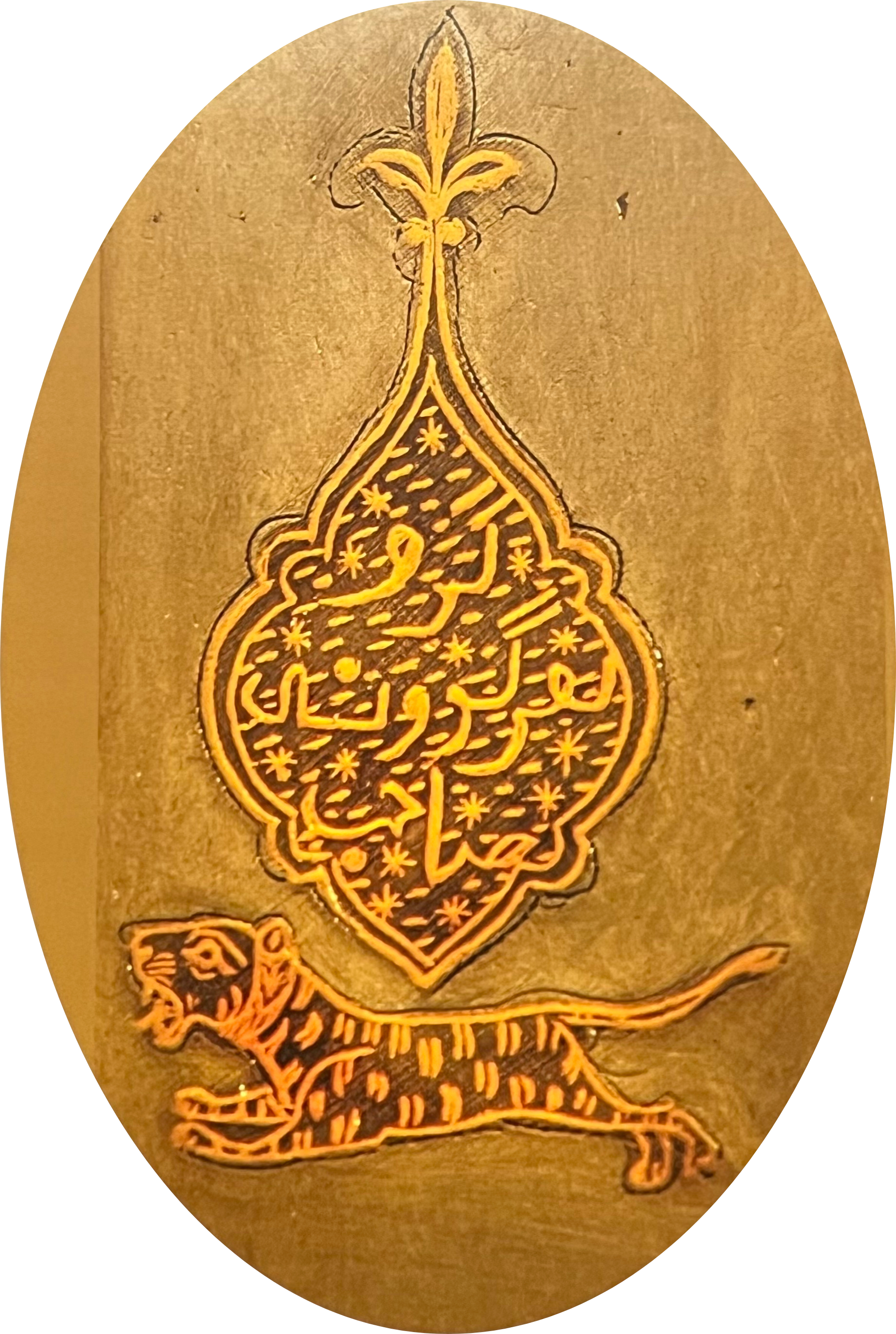
- Iconography

The Akāl Sena (Gurmukhi: ਅਕਾਲ ਸੈਨਾ; meaning 'Army of the Immortal', 'God's Army', or 'Eternal Army'; alternatively transcribed as Akaal Sena) was the Sikh military force established by the sixth Sikh Guru, Guru Hargobind. It was the first standing Sikh army. It was also known as the Akali Dal (Gurmukhi: ਅਕਾਲੀ ਦਲ, 'Immortal Brigade').

== Background ==
There are various views as to why the Sikh community and faith was martialized, with one theory being it was caused by the growing religious fundamentalism of the Mughal emperors. Some scholars, notably Trilochan Singh, argue that the roots for the martial tradition in Sikhism date back further to the guruship of Guru Arjan, pre-dating Guru Hargobind's militarization reforms and enactments. The settlement of Ramdaspur (present-day Amritsar), founded by the Sikh gurus, gradually had a small amount of guards posted to protect it, eventually evolving into a small army protecting its boundaries. Guru Arjan, the fifth guru, was interested in falconry. His son, Hargobind, was fond of weaponry. Martial-arts has a long association with Sikhism, with Guru Angad believed to have sponsored wrestling and learnt it from Guru Nanak. Guru Ram Das founded the Mal Akhara in Amritsar and awarded a turban-of-victory to Guru Arjan after he won a wrestling match against the wrestler Maskeen. The next guru Guru Hargobind martialized the Sikhs further, such as the adoption of the principle of miri-piri.

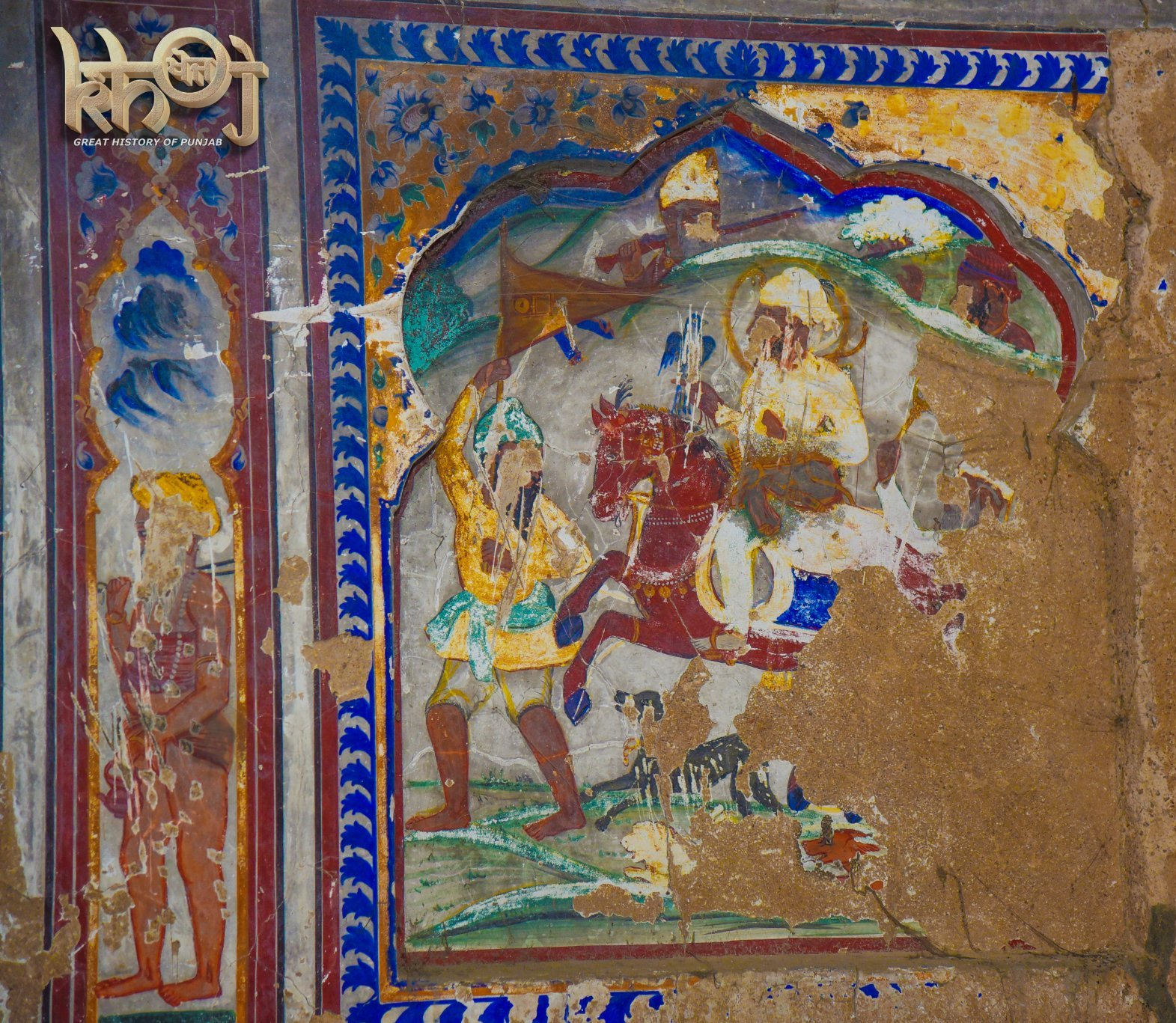
Mural of Guru Hargobind on horseback while accompanied by a flag-bearer and hunting dog and escorted by the Akal Sena, from Gurdwara Chhevin Patshahi, Hadiara, Lahore district

During the time period of Guru Arjan, an enemy of the Sikhs and the brother of Arjan, named Prithi Chand, instigated a local Mughal official named Sulahi Khan to destroy the Sikhs and the Guru. Sulahi Khan conjured up an excuse that he was collecting tax to justify him leading a small contingent against the Sikhs at Amritsar. Due to the local residents of Amritsar fearing for their personal safety, Guru Arjan left the city to prevent tragedy. Arjan made his way to Wadali and then from there to Raur. After Wadali was ransacked by bandits, Guru Arjan returned and stayed there for two years to provide security for the local residents.

Guru Arjan had advised his son, Hargobind, to become martially trained when he was a youth. The Akal Sena came into being at the same time of the consecration of the Akal Bunga on the 15 June 1606. Guru Hargobind believed that the Sikh faith was not limited to spiritual pursuits but martial power and temporal authority was vital as well. Hargobind named his son Tegh Bahadur, being named after a type of sword and bravery.

== Purpose ==
The Akaal Takhat and the Akaal Sena (God's army) the Sikhs, would protect and uphold the integrity of faith promulgated by Harmander Sahib and all it stood for. The Sikhs would become renowned for their bravery as warriors, who protect the integrity and faith of one and all. They would fight oppression and tyranny, relinquishing risk to life; they would make daring attacks on foes, defending their strong principles of righteousness.

— Harjinder Singh, Reflections on 1984 (2014), pages 16–17

It had been described as an "elite army corps" for the Sikh community to meet the "Mughal challenge". Sikhs were called upon to bring horses and equipment for the army, which they obliged. The warriors of the Akal Sena came to be known as Akalis (the immortals).

== History ==
=== Guru Hargobind ===
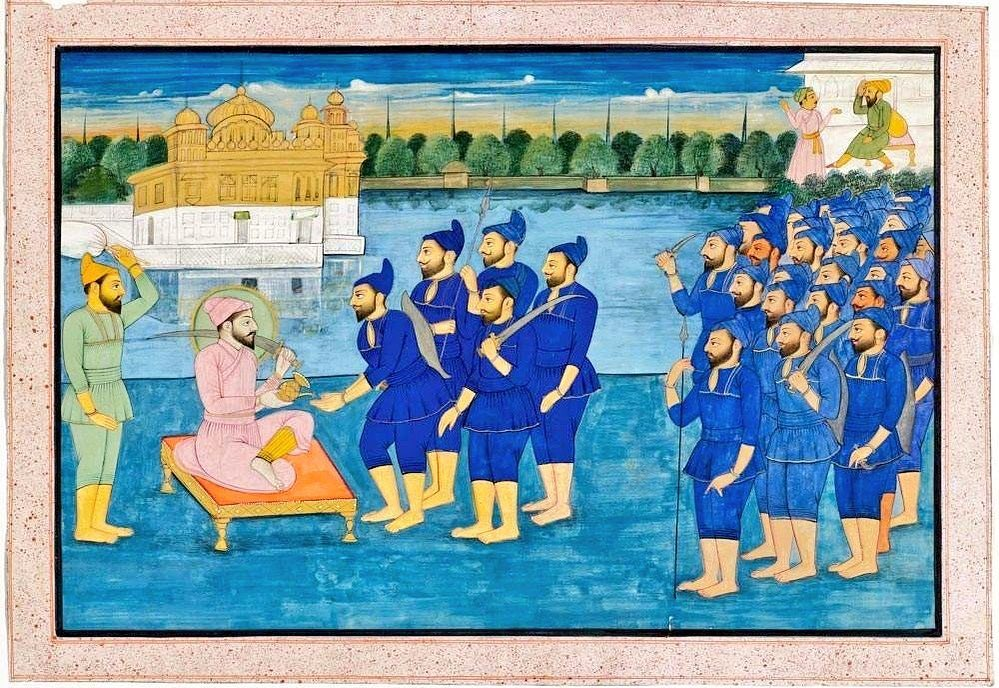
Painting of Guru Hargobind and his army, the Akal Sena, at the Golden Temple complex in Amritsar, circa 19th century

The army was founded by Guru Hargobind. During his time, it consisted of 700-800 horses, 300-500 cavalrymen, 60 musketeers, and 60 artillery men. As per the Dabistan-e-mazaheb, the guru's force consisted of 300 riders, 700 horses, and 60 gunners, with the construction of Lohgarh Fort to defend Amritsar. The Akal Sena fought major battles against the Mughal empire and its allies, winning all four of the major battles in-which Hargobind was leader, as well as more minor skirmishes. The first commanders of the Akal Sena were Bidhi Chand Chhina, Baba Jattu, Baba Peda, and Baba Praga, commanding a force around 400 strong. Later a special regiment of Pathans led by Painde Khan joined the Akal Sena.

Initially, the Akal Sena was a policing force that was an army only nominally. It was only after the release of the sixth Guru from the prison of Gwalior Fort in 1612 that the force began to take on more shape, as 52 Rajput kings also gained freedom from the prison, who then accompanied the Guru as many of them had lost their polity to conquests and absorptions by the Mughal empire. The Guru established an Akhara (Indic military training centre or arena) the same year in Amritsar, it was called the Ranjit Akhara (alt. spelt as 'Ranjeet'). Rajput converts to the Sikh faith had given the new institution much strength and information regarding the art of war.

Battles

The Akal Sena fought many battles under Guru Hargobind. The first was the Battle of Rohilla in 1621 which occurred after Akal Sena soldiers killed Bhagwan Das Ghererh, a relative of Chandu, over his blasphemous remarks. His body was dumped in the nearby river. On hearing the news of the two sons of Chandu, Rattan and Karam Chand appealed to the Mughal governor of Jalandhar, Abdul Khan, who then led an army of 15,000. The Akal Sena was smaller in number, but managed to defeat the Mughal army killing Abdul Khan, Rattan Chand, Karam Chand and the other generals along with 14,000 soldiers. Bhai Jatu was killed in this battle.

Following this battle the Akal Sena fought in no major battles until the Battle of Amritsar which occurred on April 14 of 1634. It was a two-day battle which began over a hunting dispute between Guru Hargobind and the Mughals. The Mughals attacked the Akal Sena and a minor scuffle occurred. Blows were exchanged and many Mughals died. The Mughals were forced to fall back. This was used as an excuse for Shah Jahan to send an army of 7,000 under the command of general Mukhlis Khan, Shamas Khan, Murtaza Khan, and Mustafa Khan. The Akal Sena was only 700 in number under the lead of Guru Hargobind, Bhatt Kirat, Bhai Bhanno, Bhai Peda Das, Rao Bulla, and Painde Khan. The Akal Sena was not prepared for a fight as they were busy preparing for the Guru Hargobind's daughter's wedding. It was a two-day battle. On the first day the Mughals took over Lohgarh and attacked the home of Guru Hargobind. On the second day the Akal Sena launched a counterattack. Bhai Banno was killed in battle after which Guru Hargobind took command. The battle ended when Guru Hargobind killed Mukhlis Khan in hand-to-hand combat. All the Mughal generals were killed with no Mughal soldier surviving.

This battle proved that Guru Hargobind and the Akal Sena were powerful and not a small militia. The victory cemented Guru Hargobind and the Akal Sena's presence and destroyed ideas of Mughal invincibility.

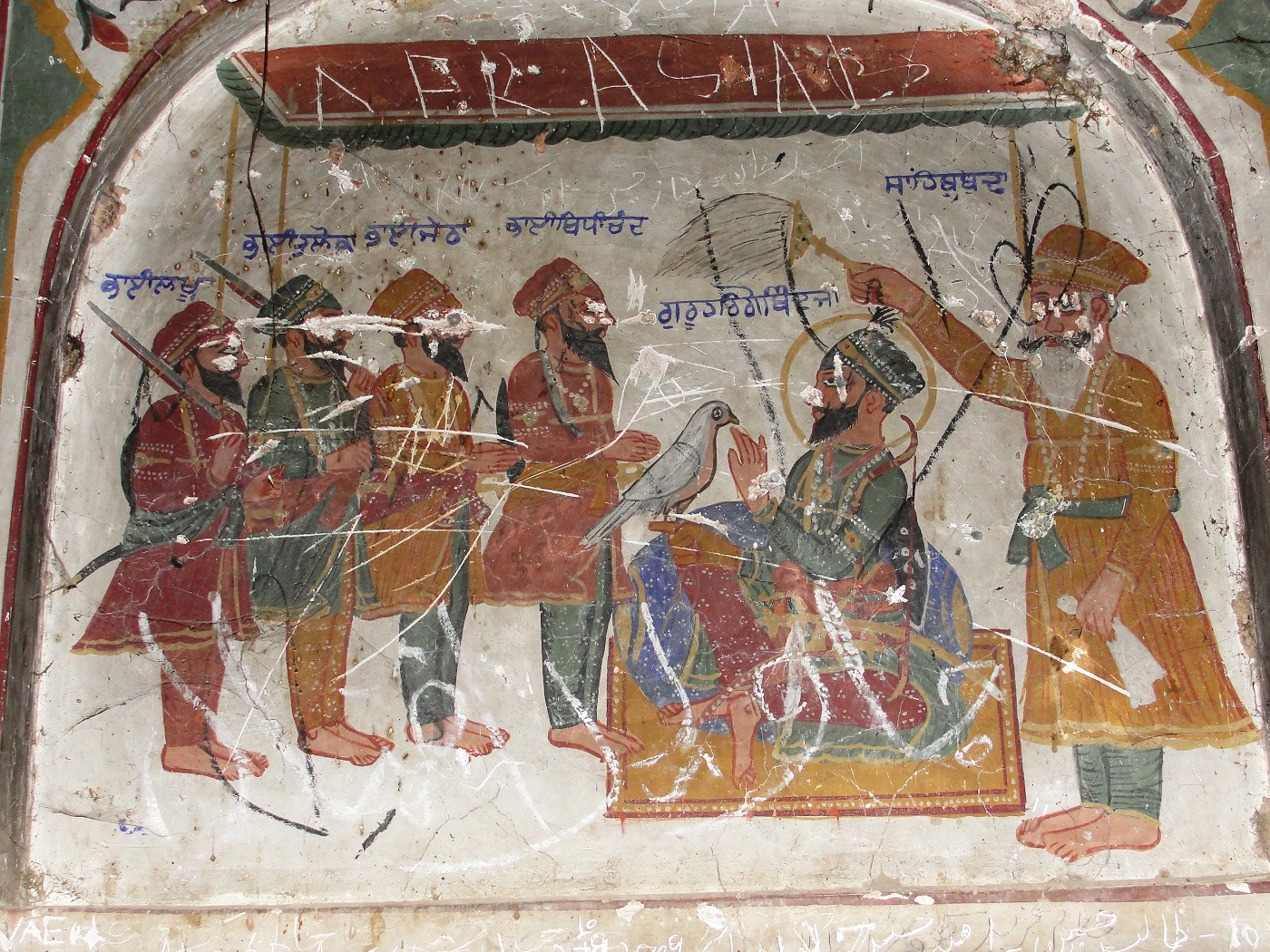
Mural of Guru Hargobind, with Bhai Lakhu, Bhai Tiloka, Bhai Jetha, Bhai Bidhi Chand, and Baba Buddha, from an unidentified Samadhi located near Gurdwara Bhai Than Singh at Kot Fateh Khan, Attock, Punjab

In revenge over recent Mughal defeats Shah Jahan stole Guru Hargobind's horses and kept them in Lahore. Bhai Bidhi Chand broke into Lahore Fort and brought the horses back to Guru Hargobind. Guru Hargobind knew of Mughal retaliation coming and prepares for battle. The Akal Sena number's 3,000 and is aided with Rai Jodh's army of 1,000. The Akal Sena and Rai Jodh's army moves into a jungle near a lake in order to have a better position in battle. Shah Jahan sends to Mughal generals Lala Beg, the governor of Kabul, and Qumae Beg his brother with an army of 36,000. A deadly battle ensues in which the Akal Sena uses guerrilla warfare tactics to win. Both Mughal generals are killed and 35,000 Mughal soldiers are killed along with 100 surrendering. 1200 soldiers of the Akal Sena also fall in the battle.

==== Betrayal of Painde Khan ====
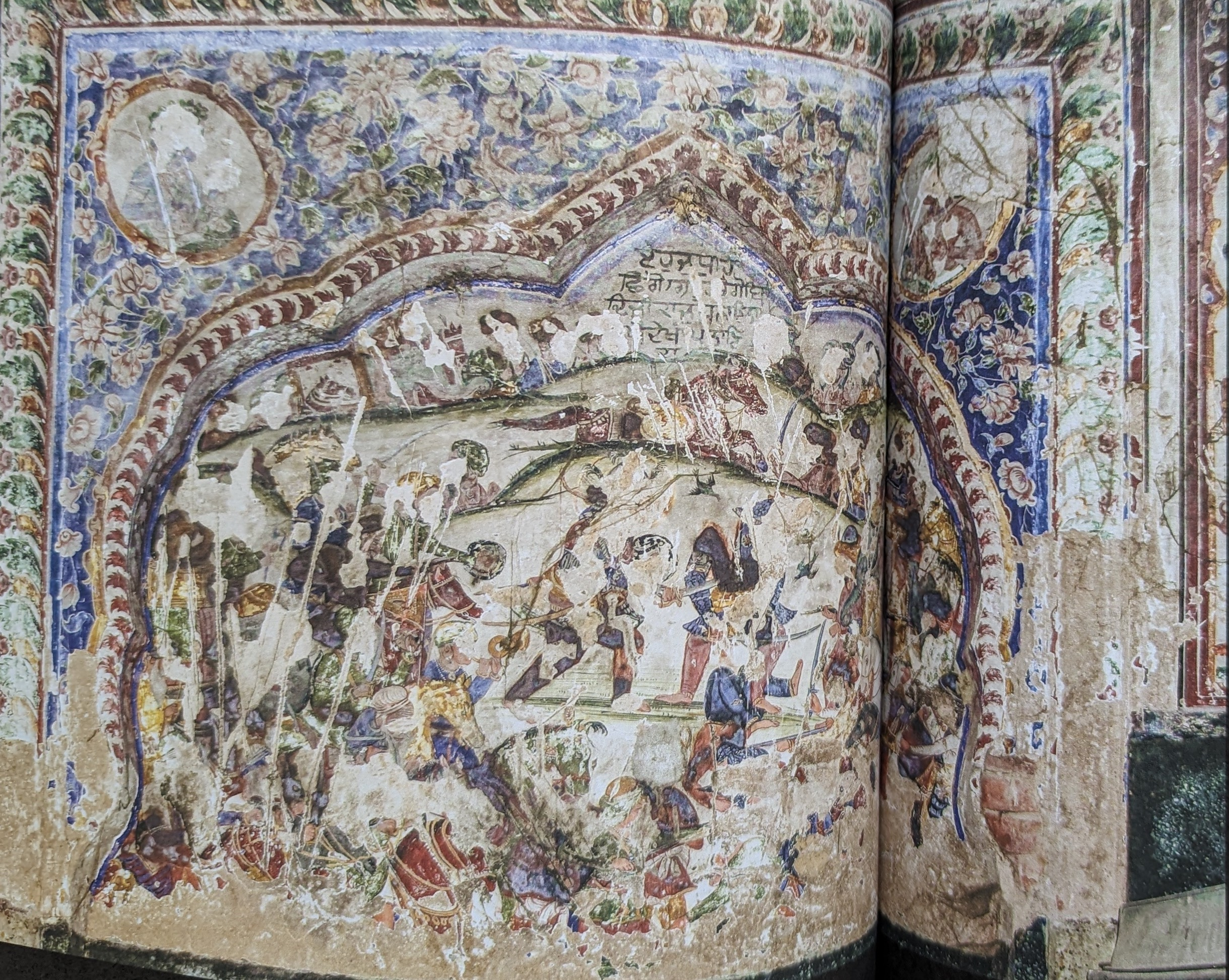
Mural depicting the Akal Sena fighting the Battle of Kartarpur (April 1635) from Gurdwara Chhevin Patshahi, Hadiara, Lahore district

Painde Khan, a Pathan general of the Akal Sena, had double-crossed his former master and mentor, Guru Hargobind, and sided with the Mughal forces. Since he served as a general in the Sikh army, he was convinced he could use that as an advantage and persuaded the Mughals to assist him in this affair against a common enemy due to his inner knowledge. He was accompanied by Kale Khan the governor of Peshawar, Kutab Khan the Faujdar of Jalandhar and his son-in-law Anwar Khan. The army was accompanied by plunderers and mujahedeen who all together numbered from 52,000 - 100,000. Painde Khan and the vast majority of his army were killed in the Battle of Kartarpur at the hands of Guru Hargobind during a duel between the two. In his last moments, the Guru showed mercy for the man he had loved and raised as his own and shielded him from the sun's direct rays with his shield as he lay dying and offered a prayer for him.

=== Guru Har Rai ===
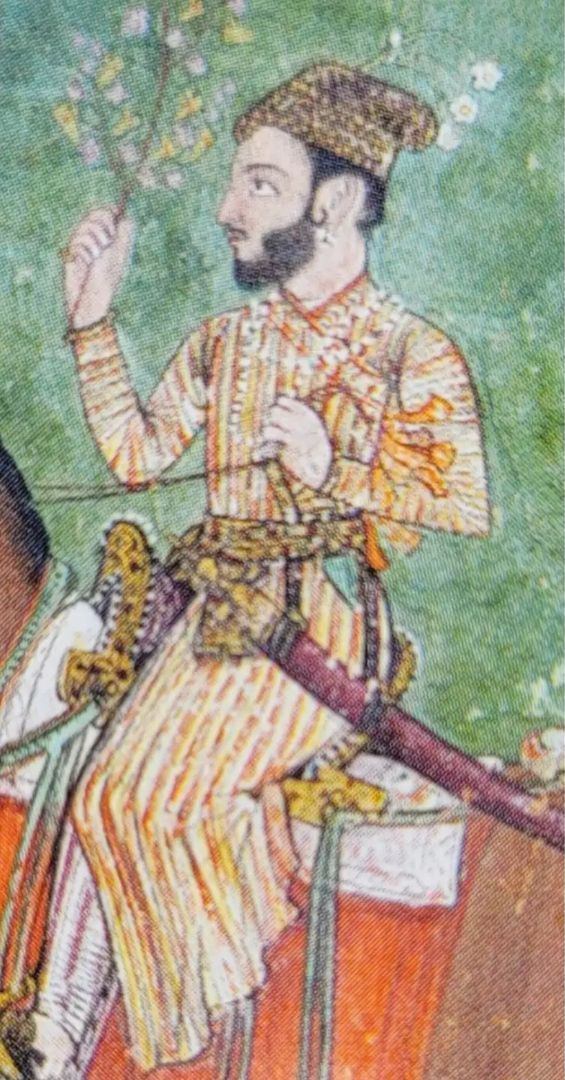
Detail of an equestrian painting of Guru Har Rai kept in the Sursinghwala collection

Guru Har Rai mostly kept the peace during his guruship, avoiding major conflicts for the most part, but he still maintained a large size for the Akal Sena, consisting of 2,200 mounted soldiers. However, this period was not a totally pacifist one for the Akal Sena, as Har Rai had deployed the army against Aurangzeb's troops in-support of Dara Shikoh. This is recorded in a Sikh source, the Mahimā Parkāsh Vārtak, which states that Har Rai deployed the Akal Sena at Goindwal to prevent Aurangzeb's forces from pursuing the fleeing Dara Shikoh, after the latter had lost the Battle of Samugarh. Guru Har Rai did not let the Akal Sena stall during these times of peace but rather he was responsible for further developing it.

=== Guru Har Krishan ===
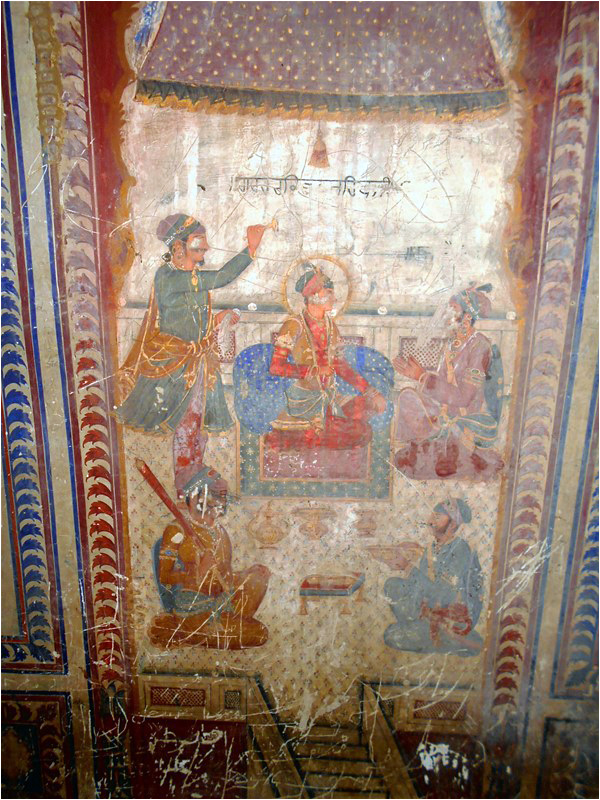
Fresco depicting Guru Har Krishan holding durbar (court) with armed followers from the Bedi Mahal

Not much is known about the Akal Sena during the leadership of the Guru Har Krishan. Sources on his life are scarce. However, he maintained the army of the Akal Sena and an entourage of armed followers guarding him.

=== Guru Tegh Bahadur ===
Originally named Tyag Mal, the ninth Guru was renamed as 'Tegh Bahadur' meaning "Brave Swordsman" after the valor he displayed fighting in the Battle of Kartarpur, alongside his elder brother Gurditta. The guru is noted as having been skilled in his usage of the kirpan sword. During his guruship, he mostly avoided conflict and was occupied by his missionary tours throughout the Indian subcontinent, focused on spreading Sikhism and meeting with local congregations of Sikhs that had been widely spread-out throughout the land.

Whilst Guru Tegh Bahadur was in Dhaka, Raja Ram Singh petitioned that the Akal Sena assist him in his crushing of a rebellion led by King Chakradhwaj Singha of the Ahom Kingdom in Kamrup (located in Assam) in north-eastern India. The Guru agreed to the request because he had plans to visit that region anyways to rebuild a monument of Guru Nanak's udasi (travel tour) to the area. The Guru and his forces reached the region in February 1669. Whilst stationed in Dhubri, Kamrup near the bank of a river, an encampment of the Akal Sena with Guru Tegh Bahadur had come under attack from the other side of the river by local Assamese forces. The Sikhs were able to defeat the enemy using archery. Afterwards, the Guru made peace with the locals after the latter informed him that they were rebelling to resist the conquests of the Mughal empire and to protect their sovereignty. Later on, the Ahom king honoured the Guru at the Kamakhya shrine after Guru Tegh Bahadur brokered peace between the imperial Mughal army under the command of Raja Ram Singh and the local Ahom resistance.

Guru Tegh Bahadur was executed by beheading on the orders of Aurangzeb, partly because the Mughal emperor had grown jealous over the growing wealth and success of the Akal Sena army of the Sikhs.

=== Guru Gobind Singh ===
Guru Gobind Singh changed the uniform and colours of the Akal Sena to blue after witnessing his youngest son, Fateh Singh, donning such garbs in this colour. Even after the Guru had implemented reforms to the Akal Sena, he believed it was not enough and something different must be done. Therefore, Guru Gobind Singh formalized the Khalsa order in Anandpur in the year 1699, which absorbed the functionalities and institution of the Akal Sena into the Khalsa Fauj.

== Dissolution ==
The Akal Sena was absorbed into the Khalsa Fauj of the Khalsa order formalized by Guru Gobind Singh in Anandpur on 13 April 1699, on the day of the Baisakhi festival.

== Legacy ==
The Akali-Nihang tradition ultimately traces itself back to the establishment of the Akal Sena.

== Symbols ==
=== Flags ===
The Nishan Sahib was first raised by Guru Hargobind at the consecration of the Akal Bunga in 1606. The flag during this time was known as the Akal Dhuja ("the immortal flag") or Satguru ka Nishan (standard of the true Guru).

Sikh Basanti (yellow) Nishan Sahib (flag) as introduced by Guru Hargobind

== Timeline of the Akal Sena ==
- 30 May 1606 – Martyrdom of Guru Arjan
- 15 June 1606 – Akal Sena established
- 1612 – Ranjit Akhara established in Amritsar
- 1621 – Battle of Rohilla (also known as battle of Hargobindpur)
- 1628 or 14 April 1634 – Battle of Amritsar
- 1628 or 1630 – Battle of Gobindpur (near Hargobindpur)
- 1631 – Battle of Mehraj
- 15 October 1634 – Battle of Lahira
- December 1634 – Battles of Lara and Gurusar
- 1634 or 25 April 1635 – Battle of Kartarpur
- 1 July 1635 - Battle of Nangal Gujjran
- 1657–1661 – Mughal war of succession and protection of Dara Shikoh from Aurangzeb's wrath
- February 1669 – Akal Sena reaches Dhubri in Kamrupa, to assist with putting down a rebellion by a local ruler against Mughal imperialism but instead broker a peace after their encampment is attacked and they meet with local forces
- 1682 – Battle Of Anandpur (1682)
- 1685 – Battle Of Anandpur (1685)
- 18 September 1686 – Battle of Bhangani
- 4 April 1691 – Battle of Nadaun
- 1695 – Battle of Anandpur (1695)
- 1696 – Battle of Guler
- 13 April 1699 – Founding of the Khalsa Panth and dissolution of the Akal Sena

== See also ==
- Sant Sipahi
- Miri piri
- Shastar Vidya
- Gatka
- Sikh chola
- Katar (dagger)
- Akal Ustat
- Sikh Khalsa Army
- Degh Tegh Fateh
- Dharamyudh
