= Parvinderjit Singh Khanuja =

Sikh doctor and art-collector

Parvinderjit Singh Khanuja (born 1959) is a Sikh doctor (oncologist) and art-collector. He is the founder and Managing Partner of Ironwood Physicians, PC and is a board member of the Five Rivers Foundation. He is a trustee of the Phoenix Art Museum. He is based in Phoenix, Arizona, USA. His collection is featured in two books.

== Biography ==
Khanuja was born in 1959 to parents Darshan Singh and Ajit Kaur. His father was originally from Jhelum (now in Pakistan) while his mother was a returnee-migrant from Nairobi in East Africa. His father was an ophthalmologist. Khanuja completed his medical degree at Christian Medical College in Ludhiana, India and his fellowship at Wayne State University School of Medicine in Detroit, after immigrating to the United States from India in 1983. In 1993, he moved from Detroit to Phoenix. Also in 1993, he opened an oncology practice in Chandler, Arizona which would become the Ironwood Cancer & Research Centers. He began collecting Sikh art in 2007 as a form of seva to preserve Sikh heritage. The Five Rivers Foundation helps provide scholarships to underrepresented students and supports social and heritage causes. His book Splendors of Punjab Heritage that was co-authored with the Smithsonian was named India's Book of the Year in 2023. In 2024, Khanuja was honoured by the Arizona Senate for his contributions to healthcare and society.

== Khanuja Collection ==
The Khanuja Family Collection consists of textiles, coins, weapons, illustrations, and photography related to Punjab and Sikhs. It also contains works by contemporary Sikh artists, such as The Singh Twins, Arpana Caur, Sukhpreet Singh, and Rupy C. Tut. The Khanuja collection of Sikh art was built through personal networks (buying from friends and other collectors) and by bidding at auction. The collection began by collecting Sikh coins in Chandigarh but later expanded to other forms of Sikh art. Khanuja was responsible for the foundation of a permanent Sikh art gallery at the Phoenix Art Museum formally called the Dr Darshan Singh and Ajit Kaur Khanuja and Mr Jaswant Singh and Mohinder Kaur Sikh Art Gallery. Beginning on 22 April 2017, the space hosted its first exhibition called Virtue and Valor: Sikh Art and Heritage curated by Janet Baker. Some exhibitions at the Sikh gallery include: World War I and the Sikhs, Guru Nanak—550 Years, Golden Temple, Chardi Kala, Princely States of Punjab, and Phulkari. The collection is documented in the book Splendors of Punjab Heritage: Art from the Khanuja Family Collection.

== Bibliography ==
- Khanuja, Parvinderjit Singh (3 October 2022). Taylor, Paul Michael (ed.). Splendors of Punjab Heritage: Art from the Khanuja Family Collection. Roli Books. ISBN 9789392130168.
- Ames, Frank; Khanuja, Parvinderjit (24 March 2026). Pashmina Jewels: The Khanuja Family Collection of Kashmir Shawls. Roli Books. ASIN B0FG2Z44PB. ISBN 9788196738747.
