= Nanakshahi =

Nanakshahi may refer to:

- Nanakshahi calendar
- Nanakshahi bricks
- Nanakshahi sikka, a type of Sikh coinage
- Nanakpanthis, a type of Sikh
