= Nishan Sahib =

Flag representing the Sikh people

- Nishan Sahib (Current Basanti reinforced by Akal Takht Authority towards 2024)
- Use: Other
- Proportion: 1:1 or 1:2
- Adopted: 12 October 1936; 90 years ago (Note: The Sikh Rehat Maryada, which includes the look of the Nishan Sahib, was ratified by the Shiromani Gurdwara Parbandhak Committee on 12 October 1936.)
- Design: A triangular flag, either basanti (xanthic) or surmai (navy blue), featuring the Khanda at its centre.
- Designed by: Guru Hargobind (yellowish-orange); Guru Gobind Singh (navy blue)

The Nishan Sahib (Punjabi: ਨਿਸ਼ਾਨ ਸਾਹਿਬ, lit. 'respected ensign'), also known simply as Niśān or as the Sikh flag, is used to represent the Sikh people worldwide. Gurdwaras and other Sikh religious spaces are usually marked with a tall flag.

In 1936, the Shiromani Gurdwara Parbandhak Committee ratified the Sikh Rehet Maryada, which states its colour as either basanti (xanthic) or surmai (navy blue). It is a triangular flag with a Khanda in its centre, made of cotton or silk cloth, and has a tassel at its end.

The most common form of the Nishan Sahib, used in gurdwaras around the world, features a saffron (orange) colour. The Akal Takht decided on 15 July 2024, in accordance with the Sikh Rehat Maryada, that only basanti or surmai colours are acceptable, while kesri (saffron) is not. The Khanda symbol decorates the flag.

A Sikh standard is known as a Jhanda Sahib, a synonymous term with Nishan Sahib. The flag-staff that plays a role in the traditions of the Ramraiyan site of Ram Rai Darbar in Dehradun is also known as the Jhanda Sahib.

== Etymology ==
Nishan is derived from a Persian word with multiple definitions, one of which is "flag" or "standard". Sahib is an Arabic term meaning "lord" or "master", in this context it is utilized in an honourifical manner. Thus, the phrase Nishan Sahib means "exalted ensign" or "holy flag".

The word jhanda means "flag" or "banner".

== Overview ==
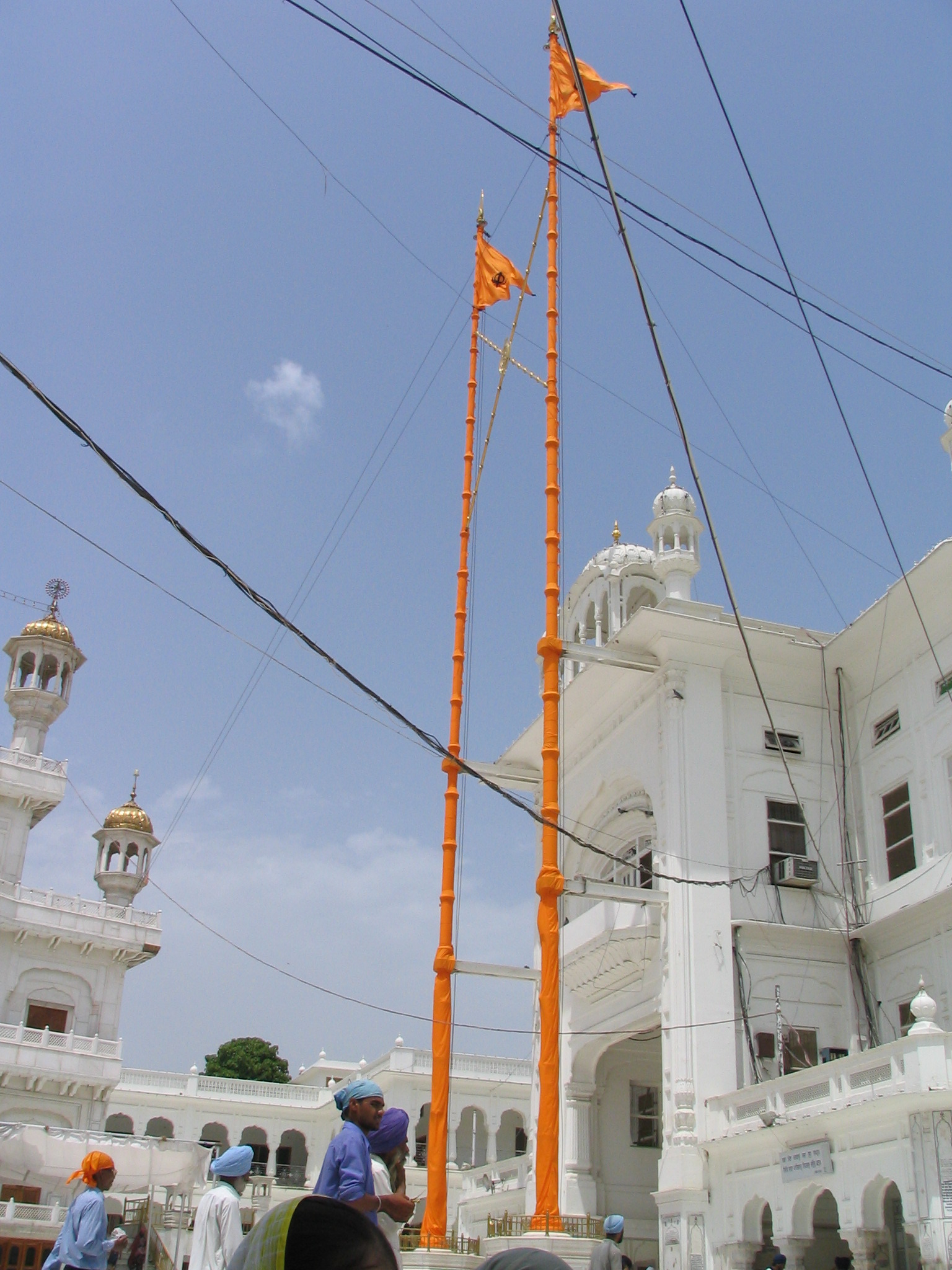
Nishan Sahib emplaced at the Golden Temple, Amritsar

The flag is hoisted on a tall flagpole outside most gurdwaras. The flag can either be fixed on a flagpole in the building's premises or at the top of the edifice itself, some Sikh sites have two flags for both scenarios.The flagpole itself, covered with fabric (called chola) of the same colour as the flag proper, ends with a steel Khanda fixed at its top (in the past an Astbuj, nagani barsha or a teer would be placed on top). The emblem on the flag is known as Khanda, which depicts a double-edged sword called a khanda (Miri te Piri) (☬) in the centre, a chakkar which is circular, and flanked by two single-edged swords, or kirpans. Other flags, instead of a khanda, are decorated by the Ik Onkar glyph (ੴ).

The flag itself is made of cloth, with the dimensions of its three sides being two equal sides that are longer than the other one, forming a triangular shape. A mast sheath is stitched to the pennant at the top, made from the same material. There is no specified size for the flag.

Nishan Sahibs are also used for Sikh processions. The flagbearer or standardbearer carrying the Nishan Sahib in a procession is referred to as a Nishanchi. The flag is held at the head of the procession.

Great respect is shown to this flag and the flag is considered sacred and washed using milk and water every year in April at the festival of Vaisakhi.

The Sikh Rehat Maryada clearly states that the Nishan Sahib hoisted outside every Gurudwara should be xanthic (Basanti in Punjabi) or greyish blue (modern day Navy blue) (Surmaaee in Punjabi) color. Prior to 2024 judgement by the Akal Takht, mainstream Nishan Sahibs were usually saffron-coloured whilst those flown by the Nihang sect were mostly blue-coloured.

== History ==
=== Sikh gurus ===
The earliest references to a Sikh flag date back to the mid-16th century, being mentioned in a verse in the Guru Granth Sahib on page 1393. In the era of Guru Amar Das, a white-triangular flag was erected at the then-newly constructed Baoli Sahib (stepwell) located in Goindwal on the bank of the Beas River. This white flag was coined the dhaval dhuja ('white banner'). The white in the flag symbolised Piri, or saintliness, but also "goodwill" and "peace", and also acting as a landmark to aid visitors seeking out a Sikh site. Some Sikh scholars believe there was also an Ik Onkar symbol inscribed on the flag that represented the oneness of the divine. The white flag was a characterisation of the raj (era) embarked by Guru Nanak. Pashaura Singh speculates that the colour of the Nishan Sahib located at the Harmandir Sahib in Amritsar was white as well during the period of Bhai Gurdas.

Within the Guru Granth Sahib, there is a reference made to the flag established by Guru Amar Das in a hymn penned by Bhatt Kalshar:

ਜਿਸੁ ਧੀਰਜੁ ਧੁਰਿ ਧਵਲੁ ਧੁਜਾ ਸੇਤਿ ਬੈਕੁੰਠ ਬੀਣਾ ॥
Jisu dhīrju dhuri dhavlu dhujā sēti baikuṇṭh bīṇā ॥

Translation:

Patience has been His white banner since the beginning of time, planted on the bridge to heaven.

— Guru Granth Sahib (page 1393) by Bhatt Kalshar

In a sawaiye composition authored by Bhatt Mathura in-praise of Guru Ram Das, it is stated:

ਫੁਨਿ ਧ੍ਰੰਮ ਧੁਜਾ ਫਹਰੰਤਿ ਸਦਾ ਅਘ ਪੁੰਜ ਤਰੰਗ ਨਿਵਾਰਨ ਕਉ ॥
Phuni dhramm dhujā phahranti sadā agh puñj taraṅg nivāran kau ॥

Translation:

And, His Banner of Righteousness waves proudly forever, to defend against the waves of sin.

— Guru Granth Sahib (page 1406) by Bhatt Mathura

Bhai Gurdas makes specific mention of a flag existing at the court of Guru Arjan in the 24th ballad of his Varan composition (24:18–23).

A mention of the banner during the period of Arjan was made by Bhatt Kalh in a sawaiye composition he authored:

ਕੁਲਿ ਸੋਢੀ ਗੁਰ ਰਾਮਦਾਸ ਤਨੁ ਧਰਮ ਧੁਜਾ ਅਰਜੁਨੁ ਹਰਿ ਭਗਤਾ ॥੬॥
Kuli sōḍhī gur rāmdās tanu dharam dhujā arjunu hari bhagtā.

Translation:

In the Sodhi family, is born Arjun, the son of Guru Raam Daas, the holder of the banner of Dharma and the devotee of God.

— Guru Granth Sahib (page 1407) by Bhatt Kalshar

After the martyrdom of Guru Arjan, the colour of the formerly white Sikh flag was replaced with saffron to symbolise sacrifice.

A new envisionment of the Nishan Sahib was raised by Guru Hargobind at the consecration of the Akal Bunga in 1606. The flag during this time was known as the Akal Dhuja ("the immortal flag") or Satguru ka Nishan (standard of the true Guru). Guru Hargobind inscribed the flag with two symbols: the two swords of miri and piri, which were actual swords and a representation of the Sikh dual concept of temporality and spirituality.

When Hargobind was imprisoned at the Gwalior Fort by the Mughal authorities, a protest march was organised by Baba Buddha and Bhai Gurdas. The protest march was known as chaunki charhni and it began from the Akal Takht in Amritsar and ended at the Gwalior Fort. It consisted of a flagbearer (nishanchi) at the front of the procession holding the Nishan Sahib. Beside the flagbearer was a torchbearer, known as a mishalchi.

Guru Gobind Singh imprinted two symbols on the Nishan Sahib after the formalisation of the Khalsa order in 1699: a cooking vessel or cauldron to represent deg (food for all) and a sword, known as a tegh (justice for all). These concepts were Sikh ideals to live up to and were represented by these symbols on the flag.

=== Sikh states ===
During the time of the Sikh Misls, the misl which was responsible for bearing the Nishan Sahib was the Nishanwalia Misl, named after this role. The Nishanwalia Misl also was responsible for appointing the flag-bearers for the other misls. The role assigned to carry the flag in procession was considered an honourable one. The Bhangi Misl were the first to erect a flag on-top of the Darbar Sahib, which they did in 1771.

Within the Sikh Khalsa Army, different regiments had their own particular flags they flew.

=== Colonial period ===
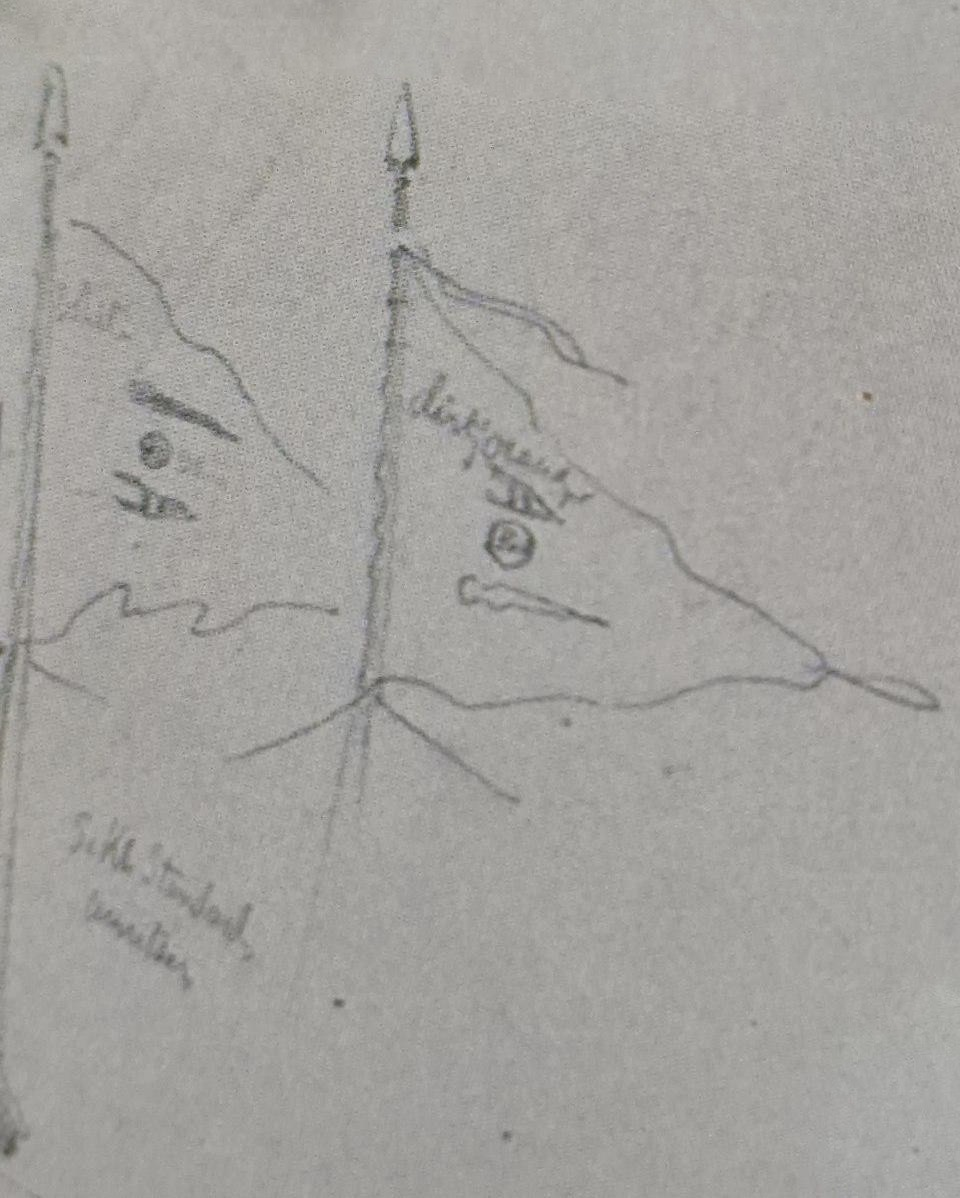
Drawing of the Sikh standard flag of Amritsar, by William Simpson, 1860

After the colonization of Punjab, Sikh coinage fell into decline (apart from Sikh-ruled princely states), thus one of the means of displaying the symbols of deg tegh fateh was lost. This allowed for more focus on the remaining means of symbolic display via the Sikh flag, culminating in greater reverence and ceremonial attention being paid toward the Sikh flag. This led to the development of ceremonies such as circumambulating its base and ceremonially changing its cloth covering annually. The modern form and envisionment of the Nishan Sahib can be traced back ultimately to the time of the Singh Sabha Movement.

=== Present day ===
The dual Nishan Sahibs in-front of the Akal Takht are fixed on around 40-metre tall flag-poles, which are the two tallest structures at the site. Most modern Nishan Sahibs are saffron in colour but the Nihang sect of Sikhs usually maintain a dark blue-coloured flag at their gurdwaras. During the 2020–21 Indian farmers' protest, the Nishan Sahib was briefly hoisted over the Red Fort in Delhi by Sikh protesters, but was misunderstood as representing Khalistan. In a 26 July 2024 circular, the SGPC mandated that the Nishan Sahib flown by Sikhs should be either basanti (xanthic) or surmai (greyish-blue) in colour.

== Weapons and ornaments ==
The original Nishan Sahib carried by Guru Gobind Singh ji in the Kattar, Dhal, Kirpan format had either a Ashtabhuja Duja, Nangini Barcha or Karpa Barcha used as a spear on top. The Nagni Barcha or snake like sword was created by Guru Gobind Singh ji and famously used by Bhai Bachittar Singh to pierce the trunk of a drunken, armored elephant in the Battle of Nimolgarh. The Ashtabhuja is a spear with three crescents stuck to an iron rod with two spears coming out on top. The Ashtabhuja was mainly used as the Battle Stadered of the Tenth Guru and is highly recommended. Guru Gobind Singh Ji's ashtabhuja was found in Chamkaur sahib the place where his two sons were martyred and other two captured with his mother. The flag is simply wrapped around the top of the spear with two strings of fabric coming out of the tip.

While today's Nishan Sahib has a Khanda in a dagger form on top of the flag and the fabric covering the spear till the top. The Khanda symbol is also relatively new and was made in the early 19th century.

== Historical evolution of the Nishan Sahib ==
Flag	Date introduced	Use	Description
	1889–2024	Nishan Sahib used until 2024.	The flag alongside its Khanda adopted an orange colour, which has been replaced in June 2024, as it was not historically part of Sikh tradition.
	26 June 2024 – Present	Present Day	This was introduced back by the SGPC of Basanti (xanthic) or surmai (greyish-blue as the colour during Guru Hargobind

== Gallery ==
Illustrated folio of a Nishan Sahib from a Guru Granth Sahib manuscript housed at Takht Keshgarh Sahib, Anandpur and dated to 1714

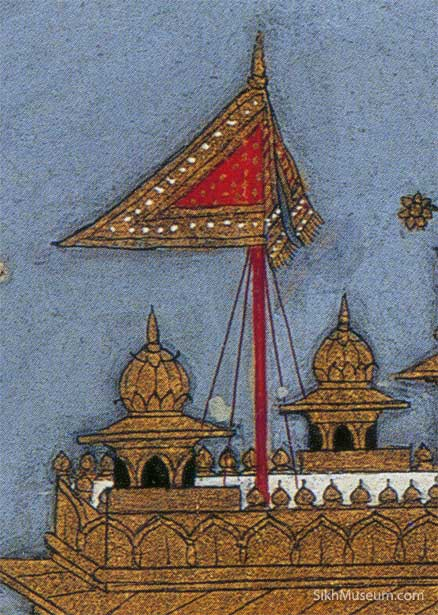
Nishan of Harmandir Sahib, ca. 1840

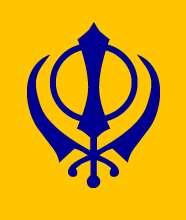
Khanda

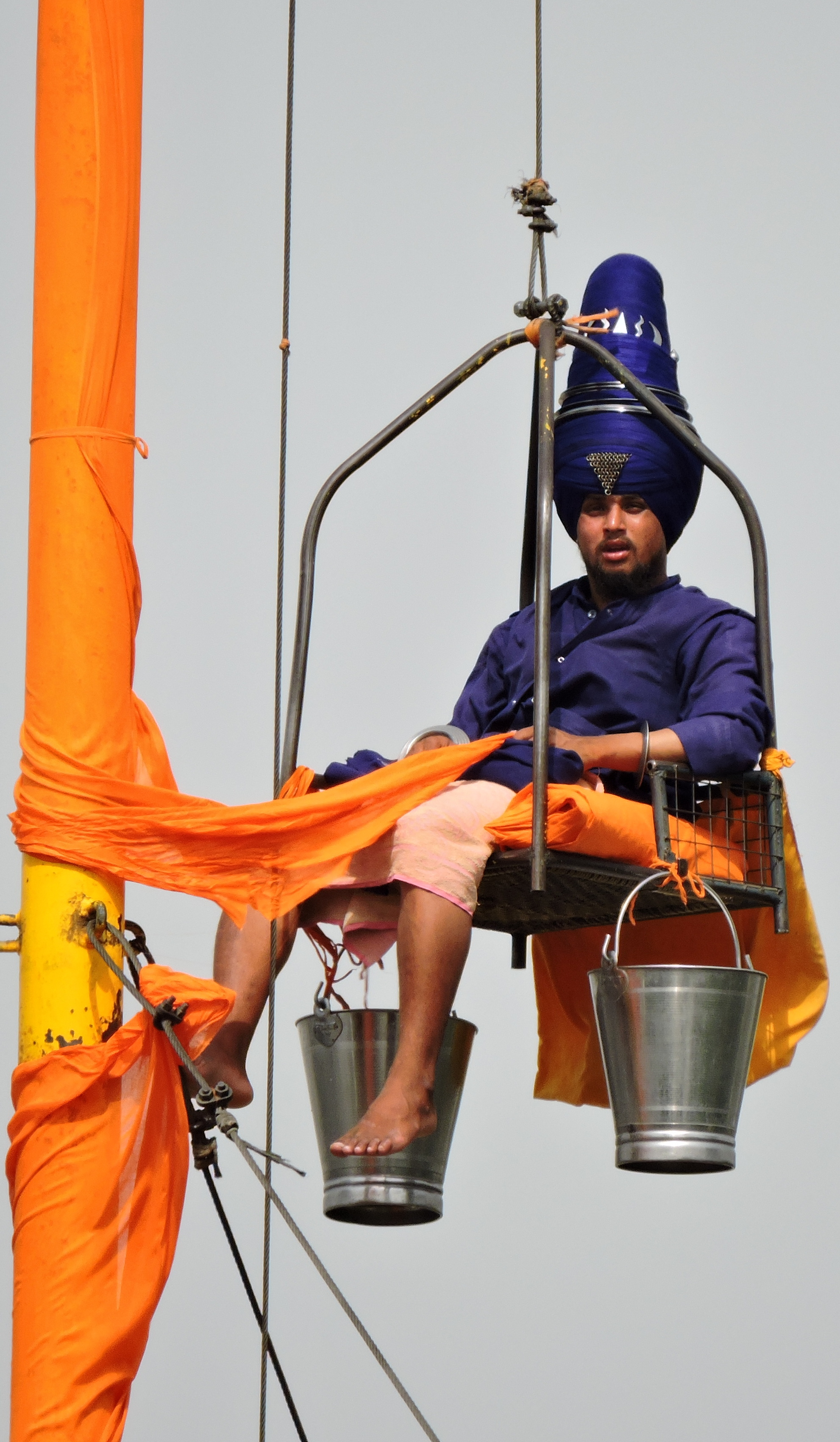
A Nihang Singh changing cloth of Nishan Sahib, Gurdwara Singh Shaheedan, Sohana, Mohali, Punjab, India

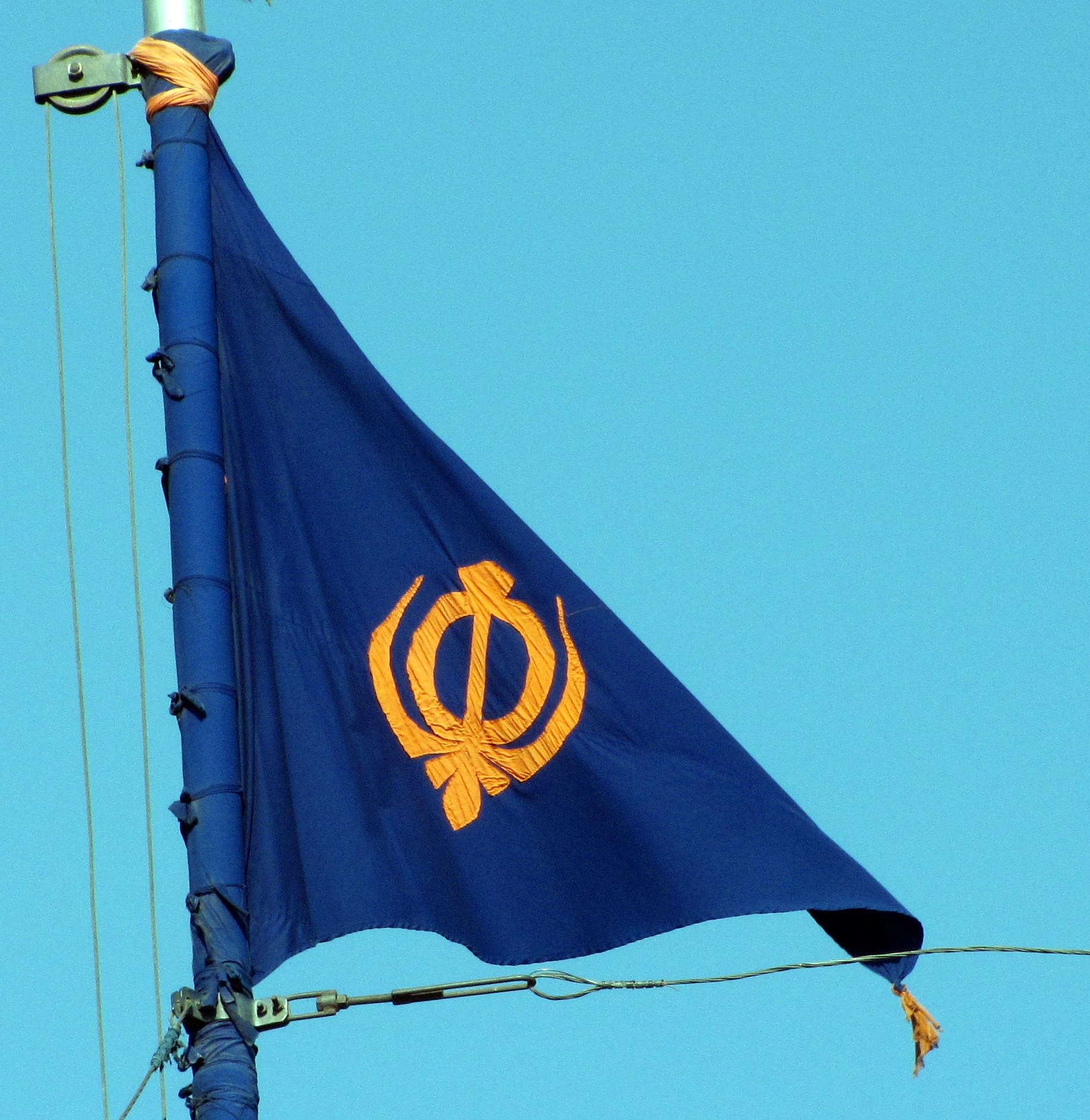
Nishan Sahib in blue, at Akali Phoola Singh di Burj in Amritsar

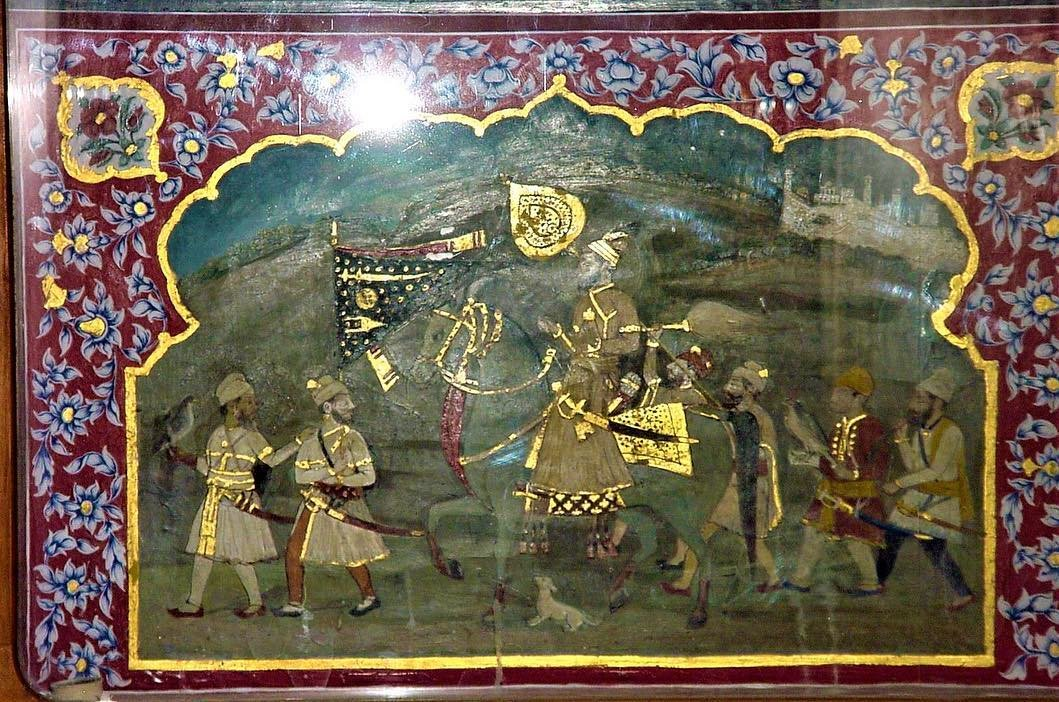
ca.1820 fresco from Harmandir Sahib showing Nishan with Katar (dagger), Dhal (shield), and Kirpan (sword)

Sikh Basanti (yellow) Nishan Sahib (flag) as introduced by Guru Hargobind

Sikh Nihang Khalsa Fauj Flag, introduced by Guru Gobind Singh

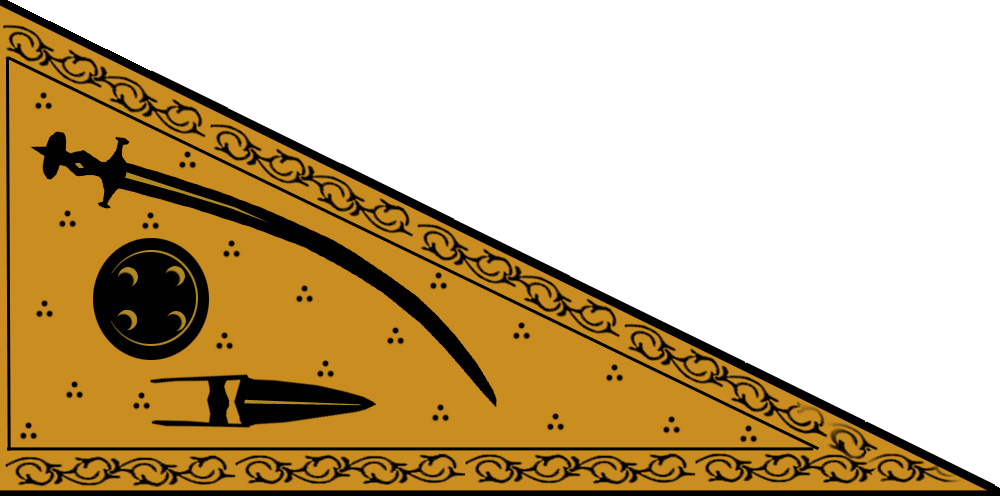
Flag used during the times of Sikh misls and the Sikh Empire

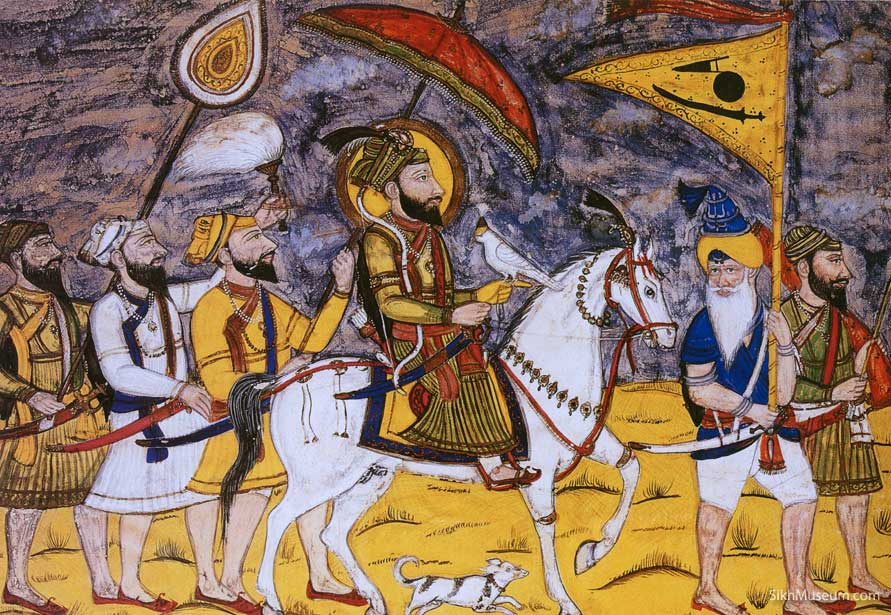
19th century painting depicting Guru Gobind Singh with followers carrying Basanti flag with emblems

Sikh Empire Nishan Sahib flag, introduced by Ranjit Singh

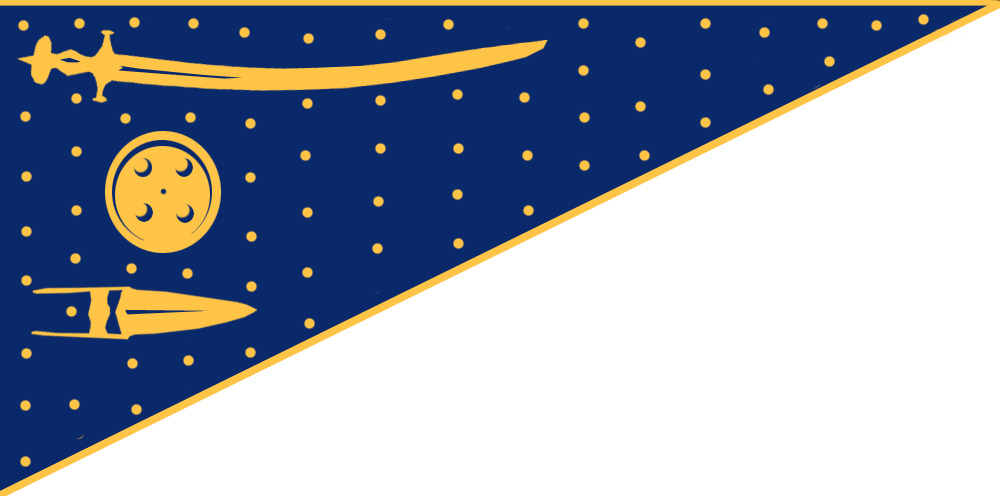
Flag of the Nihang Khalsa Fauj showing weapons like Katar (dagger), Dhal Shield and Kirpan. The standard goes from 'bottom to top' signifying that the armies of the tenth guru are always victorious.

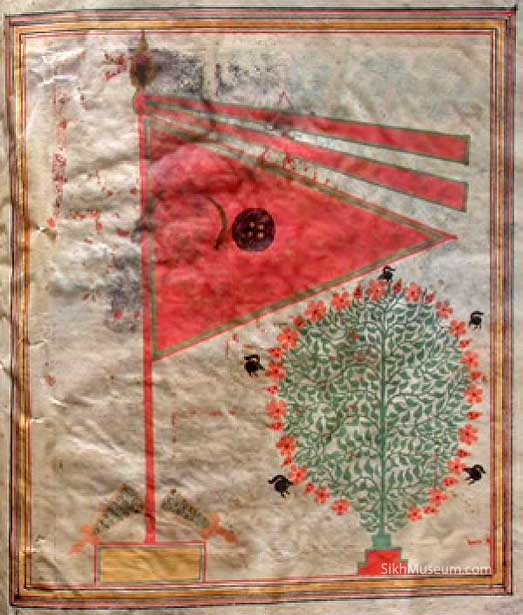
Illuminated Guru Granth Sahib folio of a Nishan, ca. 1775, with red background, thin gold borders, and central motif of a tulwar sword and dhal shield. Paint on paper, Punjab

== See also ==
Flags of other Indian origin religions.

- Bhagwa Dhwaj
- Buddhist flag
- Dhvaja
- Jain flag
