= Bhai Gaura =

- Relatives: Bhai Bhagtu (father); Bhai Adam (grandfather); Bhai Jeewan (brother); Dayal Das (son); Baba Gurbaksh Singh (grandson)
- Military career
- Allegiance: Akal Sena
- Known for: Sikh warrior who saved Guru Har Rai

Bhai Gaura was the eldest son of Bhai Bhagtu, and was a devotee of Guru Arjan, warrior, and native of Vinjhu, 14 km north of Bathinda, India.

== Saving Guru Har Rai ==
Once Guru Har Rai and his bodyguards were walking along the Sutlej River. There they met Mughal troops which were marching from Lahore to Delhi. One of the Mughal officers named Muhammad Yarbeg Khan who was the grandson of Mukhlis Khan who had been killed by Guru Hargobind, inquired the name of the party and upon learning that it was Guru Har Rai, he immediately attacked seeking revenge. Bhai Gaura came out of the shadows and defended Guru Har Rai with his troops. Muhammad Yarbeg Khan was slain by Bhai Gaura. Upon knowing that Bhai Gaura saved his life, Guru ji forgave Bhai Gaura.

== See also ==
- Nihang
- Martyrdom and Sikhism
