= Miri Piri =

Sikh concept

Miri Piri (Gurmukhi: ਮੀਰੀ-ਪੀਰੀ; mīrī pīrī) is a concept that has been practiced in Sikh religion since the seventeenth century. It is also known as dīn and dunīyā.

== Etymology ==
Miri is believed to have originated from the Perso-Arabic “Amir” or “Emir”, intended to signal political power, while Piri is believed to have originated from the Perso-Arabic “Pir”, meant to signal spiritual power.

== Philosophy ==
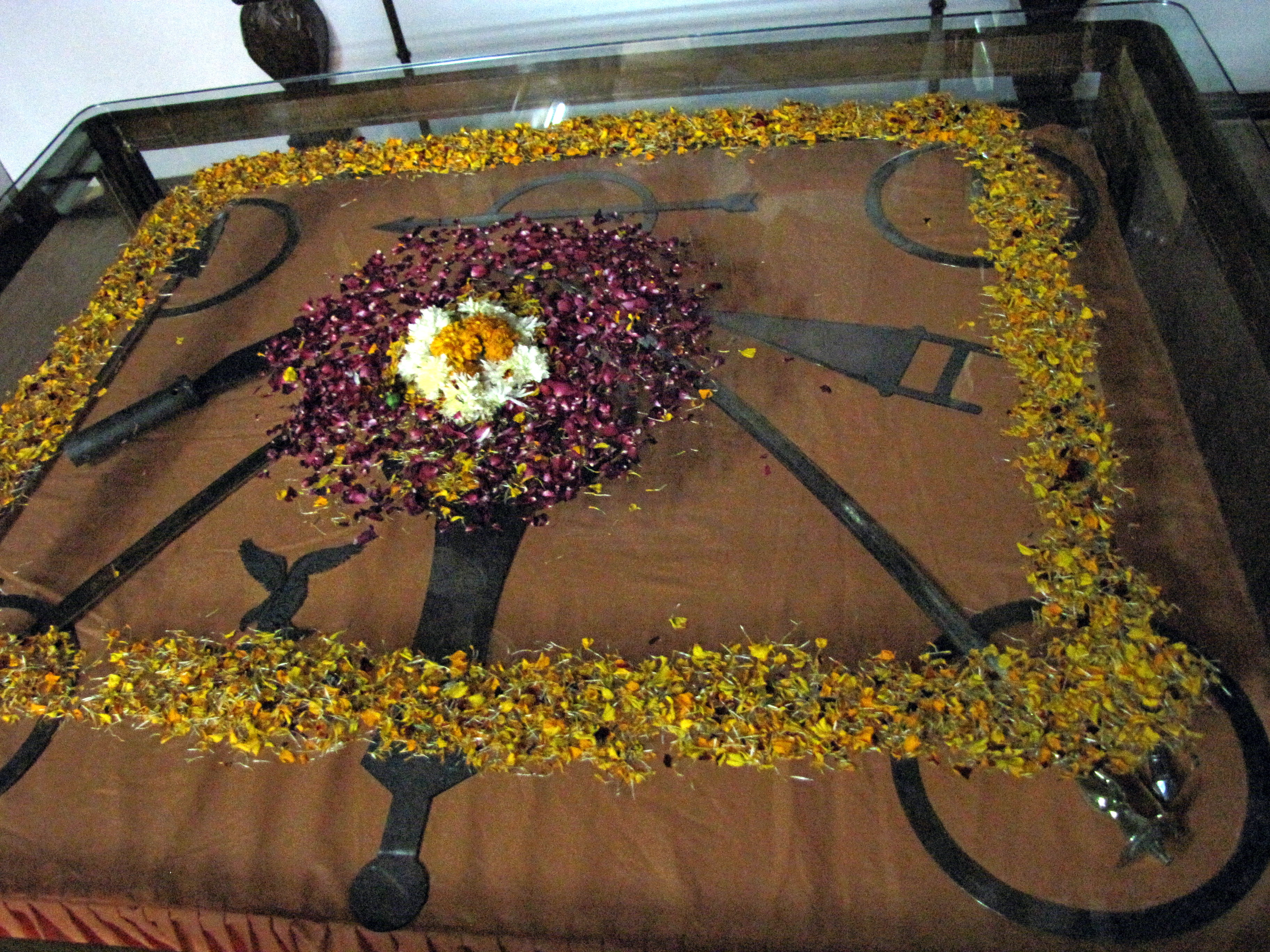
Photograph of weaponry relics of Guru Hargobind, including the twin swords of Miri and Piri, kept at Gurdwara Guru Ki Wadali, by Jasleen Kaur, 8 December 2008

In Sikhism, individual spirituality plays a role in personal development while state authority is responsible for societal progress. This dyadic dynamic is termed miri-piri, representing both temporal and spiritual authority, with both being seen as essential for meaningful, human life. The Sikh gurus interpreted the world around them as being one of declining morality, caused by degenerating religion and tyrannical rulers. In order to combat such a state of decline and dereliction, starting with Guru Nanak they integrated into and advocated for the power of karmayog (social activism) as a fundamental aspect of their religious tradition. A key aspect here is the shunning of asceticism by escaping the society, rather the Sikh gurus engaged with it and devised a method to turn it into a force for good by centering it around fondness for both the creator and the creation. Through this activity of social activism, political power is gradually acquired, which can be a force to better the society. Political power must be balanced with both the values of Chardi Kala (optimism) and Sarbat da Bhalla (welfare for all) so that it does not generate into oppressive rule due to greed of power or wealth, rather society must be governed for the benefit of all through proper planning and resource allocation, not for the benefit of the few. Thus, political power is the means to better humanity as a whole, not the objective in itself to acquire political power and influence to further one own's personal or partisan gain (seen as a vice) at the cost of societal welfare. State power must be guided by correct spiritual principles.

Such an idealized society is termed as a Halemi Raj, where in the absence of force and coercion there is instead sincerity and compassion to cultivate an atmosphere of humility, peace, and grace where all life is treasured. In such a world, there is no discrimination (such as based on caste, religion, race, or appearance), a sense of solidarity and fellowship between all nations and religions of mankind, there would be no internal divisions remaining amongst people that formerly divided them from each other and set them apart, and dignity and self-respect will prevail while terror and fear shall be diminished creating a less agonizing existence. Such a state is believed to be a cultural producer. The ideology touches upon class divisions, with it emphasizing that workers and laborers will bear the fruits of their effort (ending their hunger and destituteness) and no longer suffer under the rich, powerful, and tyrants. Not only humans but all life would be treated based upon a sense of love, compassion, justice, and equality, with the society being a place of refuge.

Statecraft is necessary for conquest of the world but for the internal conquest involving the human mind, spirituality is the path to hone it.

== History ==
The concept of the Mir and the Pir (temporal power and spiritual authority) was introduced by the sixth Sikh Guru, Hargobind. Shortly before the Shaheedi (martyrdom) of his father and predecessor, the then Guru Arjan Dev, nominated Hargobind for the Guru Gaddi (ਗੁਰੂ ਗੱਦੀ). After his father's death, Guru Hargobind introduced the two swords of Miri and Piri symbolizing both worldly (political) and spiritual authority. Where action informed or arising out of the spiritual heart completes one’s purpose and meaning in the world of action: spirituality.

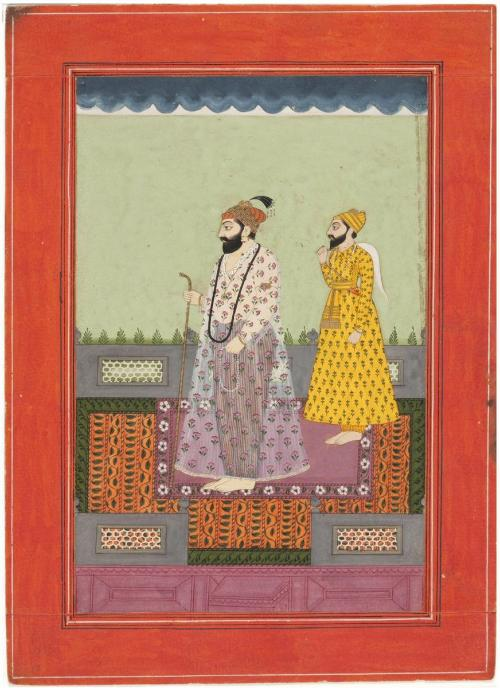
Detail from a miniature painting of Guru Hargobind with an attendant. The Guru holding a staff in one hand and mala prayer beads in another representz the Sikh concept of miri-piri, with the staff representing temporality and the beads representing spirituality

Some Sikhs believe that this fulfills a prophecy given by Baba Buddha that the Sikh will possess spiritual and temporal power.

=== Present-day ===
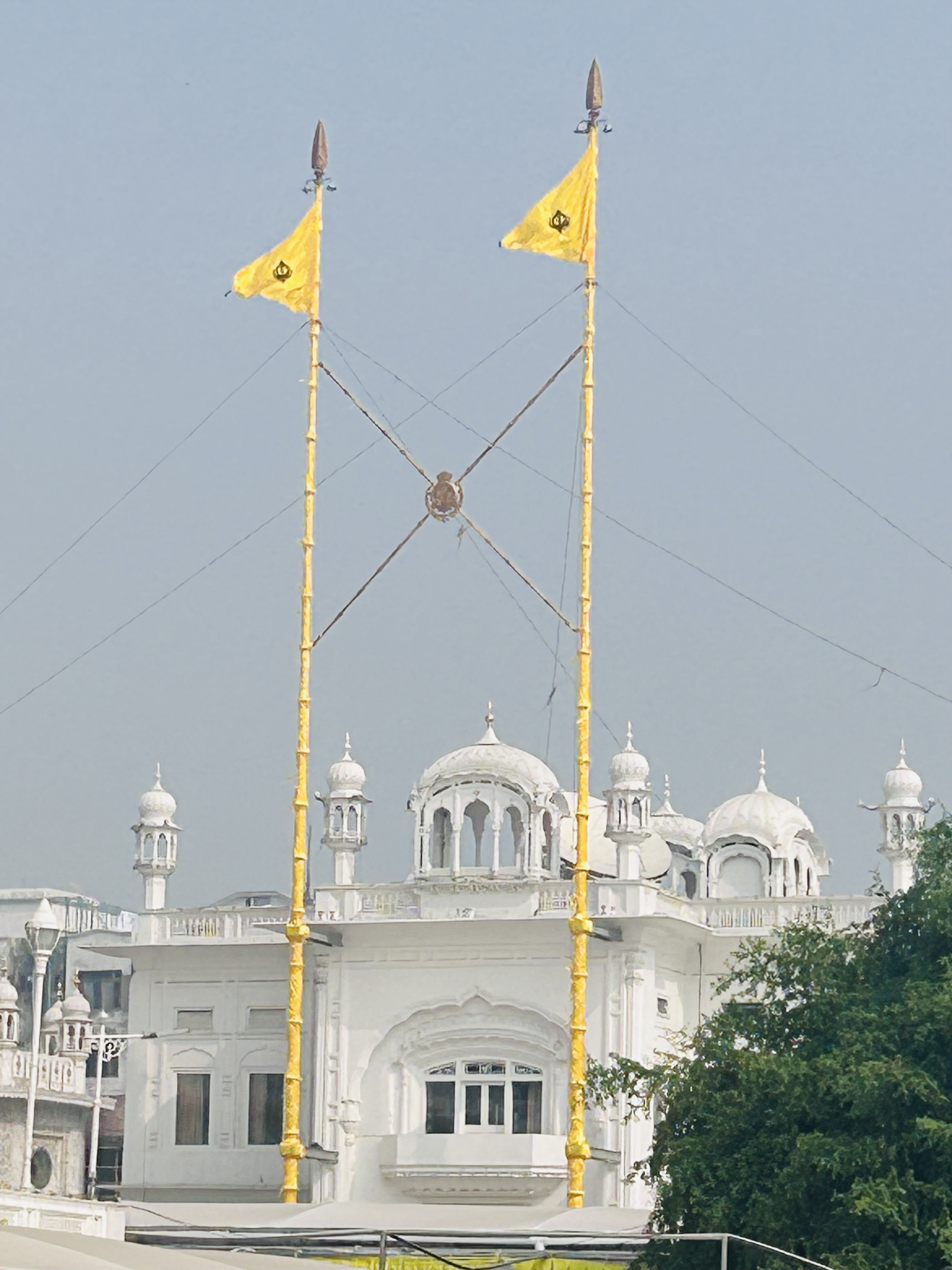
Miri-Piri, the twin Nishan Sahib flags of the Golden Temple complex, Amritsar, Punjab

The Sikh Khanda shows the two swords of Miri and Piri are tied together with a larger vertical khanda in center. This, in combination with the chakram, displays the Sikh concept of Degh Tegh Fateh.

== See also ==
- Sant Sipahi
- Khanda
