= Muklishgarh =

Muklishgarh is a Rang Mahal fort in the foothills of the Himalayas in the Yamunanagar district of Haryana in India.

== Brief history ==
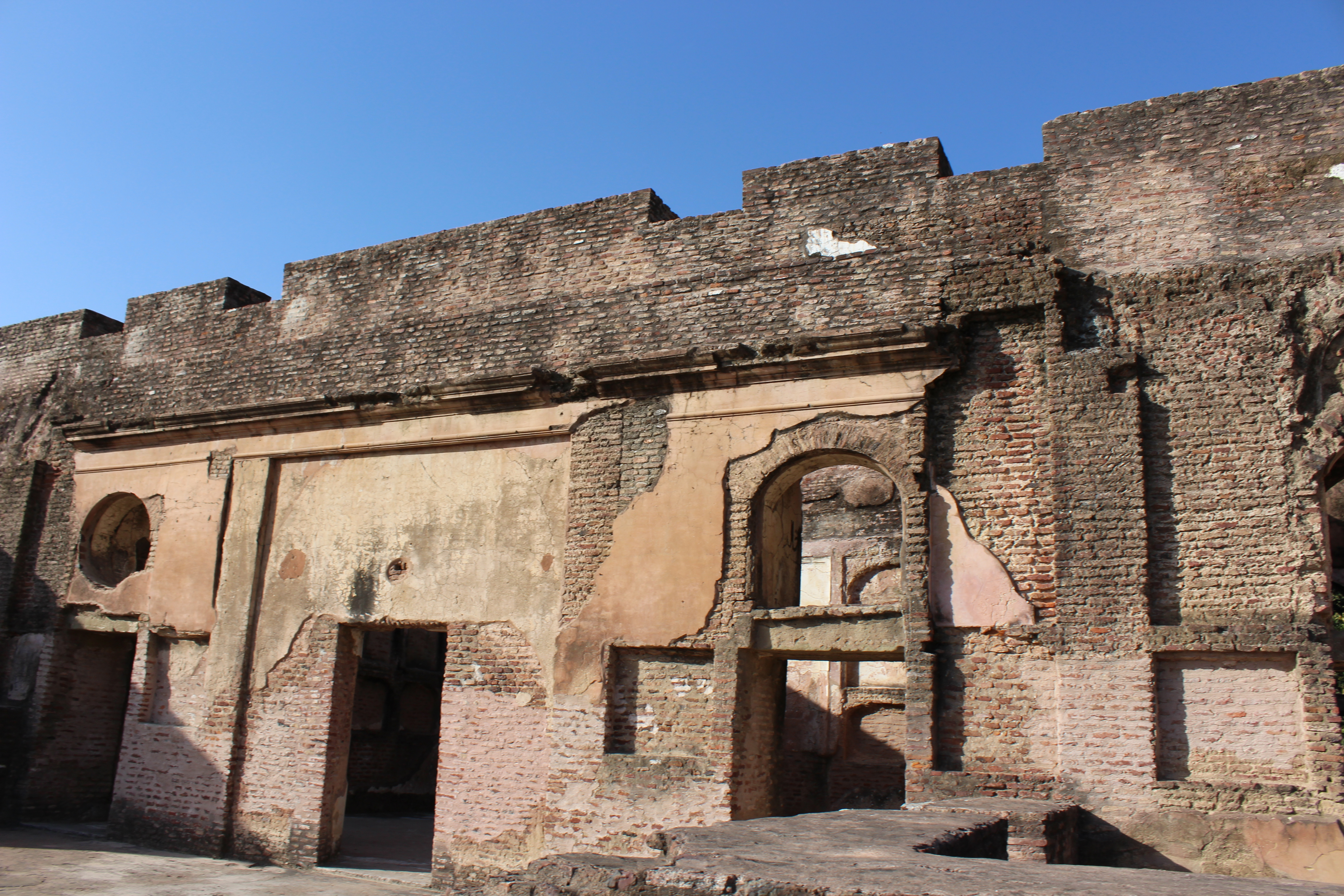
Muklishgarh - The Rang Mahal of Shah Jahan

Under Shahjahan (1627–1658), the celebrated Ali Mardan Khan laid down a Rang Mahal named Muklisgarh, and in it built a royal hunting lodge, known as Badshahi Mahal, on the left bank of the Yamuna, to the north–west of the Faizabad pargana. The palace was pleasantly situated opposite to head works of the Delhi Mughal Canal, and its portions were standing till the beginning of the present century. To the same nobleman is due the construction of the canal. He is said to have designed the canal, which was conducted with a considerable knowledge of hydraulics, along the crest of the high ground between Yamuna and Hindan, so as to admit of its water being thrown off on both irrigation purposes. The canal was, however, little used till afterwards. Property in money and jewels left by the powerful minister, Ali Mardan Khan, at his death was estimated at a sum equal to Rs 18,00,000. It was in this reign that the small mahal of Jahangirabad was separated from Raipur Tatar, about the same time that the latter's name was altered to Faizabad which became for a while the capital of the sarkar Saharanpur.

=== Historian views about Muklishgarh ===
Invine, on the authority of 'Anonymous Fragments', says that 'Islam Khan (Salim Shah) son of Sher Khan Sur, in his days of brief authority, began to build a strong fortress under the name of Pawangarh. It was left unfinished and fell into ruins'.-Later Mughals p. 109. But the name Moklespore (mentioned in Rennels map of countries between Delhi and Candhaar, 1792), is itself suggestive of its founder. Iradat Khan calls it Daber.

Prof. Ganda Singh in his book Life of Banda Singh Bahadur writes on pages 55–56 The fort of Mukhlispur was built by one Mukhlis Khan under instructions from Emperor Shah Jahan who occasionally spent his summer there. It was a strong hill-fort about halfway between the towns of Sadhaura and Nahan (about 9 km from Sadhaura), within the boundary of the village of Amuwal, among the steeps of the Himalayas on an elevated summit which could be approached only by craggy rocks and ravines. It was surrounded by two rivulets, Pamuwali and Daska-wali Khols or Khuds, which originally formed only one stream, parting into two to embrace the hillock of the fort. The fort was in a most neglected condition when Banda Singh Bahadur occupied it. It was soon repaired and was given the new name of Lohgarh or Iron Fort.

Surinder Singh in his book Discovering Baba Banda Singh Bahadur, writes on pages 285–286, Banda Bahadur carried out the repairs to the Mukhlispur fortress and renamed it as Lohgarh. He also fortified it by laying 3 to 4 ft high and 50- to 100-ft-long stone walls, 52 in number. Sikh soldiers could stay behind these walls and the Mughal Empire forces trying to reach the fortress and to face their gunshots and arrows about 15 times before they could reach the top. Large-scale troops could not climb and on two occasions when they were able to and large-scale assault is not possible at the Fort, follow Banda Bahadur and his troops up to Lohgarh, the imperial forces lost a large number of soldiers but were not able to catch Banda Bahadur and his men. This small defensive arrangement has been deemed as a capital by a large number of historians form Punjab when the site was hardly about 100 to 200 km from major parts of Punjab and could be easily visited and examined. The author had the occasion to visit and examine this-the Sadhaura-Lohgarh-Sitaragarh axis-a large number of times in his capacity as convenor for the raising of a suitable memorial by the Shiromani Gurdwara Parbandhak Committee. This author is of the opinion that half an acre of land on which Lohgarh has been raised is generally occupied by medium sized bavelis (large houses). He is also of the opinion that Lohgarh was not declared as the capital of the nascent Sikh state because three series of the coins issued by Banda Bahadur from 1710 to 1712 do not carry any name of the city or town after the word zarb meaning minted at. Had it been fixed as a capital, the name of Lohgarh would have certainly come on the coin. The legend after the word zarb, is "place of perfect peace, picture of a beautiful city where the fortunate throne of Khalsa is to be located".

Dr. Harjinder Singh Dilgeer in his book Great Sikh General Banda Singh Bahadur, writes on page no 57, the Sikhs had captured the fort of Mukhlisgarh (Lohgarh) and had established it as capital.

Dr. J.S. Grewal in his book 'The Sikhs of the Punjab' writes on page no 83, he adopted Mukhlispur, an imperial fort now given the name of Lohgarh, as his capital and struck a new coin in the name of Guru Nanak and Guru Gobind Singh.

Dr. Khushwant Singh in his book A History of the Sikhs second edition writes on page no 103, Banda was too shrewd to place much reliance on the loyalties of the new converts and he made the old fort of Mukhlisgarh, in the safety of the Himalayas, his headquarters. At Mukhlisgarh, Banda learned that Bahadur Shah, after subjugation of Rajasthan and not likely to return to Delhi before the monsoons. Banda decided to utilize the opportunity to destroy the remaining vestiges of Mughal rule in northern India.

Dr. Hari Ram Gupta in his book History of the Sikhs, writes on page no 11, he, therefore, established his headquarters, in the beginning of February 1710, at Mukhlispur situated in lower Shiwalik hills south of Nahan, about 20 km from Sadhaura. Its fort stood on a hill top. Two kuhls or water channels flowed at its base and supplied water to it. This fort was repaired and put in a state of defence. All the money, gold and costly material acquired in these expeditions were deposited here. He struck coins and issued orders under his own seal. The name of Mukhlispur was changed to Lohgarh, and it became the capital of the first Sikh state.

=== Lohgarh and Muklishgarh are different sites ===
The contemporary historians were Mughals, therefore they deliberately projected a wrong picture of Lohgarh. Later on, the other historians picked, their references in the context of Lohgarh leading to the depiction of wrong interpretation of history. Muklishgarh is almost 30 km away from Lohgarh.

=== Muklishgarh is now a protected site of Archaeological Survey of India ===
Archaeological survey of India Has spent about 2 crore rupees for the preservation and restoration of the site. see serial 261 of the list published by ASI.
