= Deg tegh fateh =

Sikh slogan

Deg tegh fateh (Punjabi: ਦੇਗ ਤੇਗ਼ ਫ਼ਤਿਹ, deg teġ fateh; meaning Victory to Charity and Arms) is a Sikh slogan and the title of an anthem in the Punjabi language that signifies the dual obligations of the Khalsa: The responsibility to provide food, and to provide protection, for the needy and oppressed.

== Meaning ==
Degh tegh fateh means:

- Degh: cauldron, food for all
- Tegh: sword, justice for all
- Fateh: communal sovereignty

Deg refers to the "cauldron" and Tegh to the "sword." The cauldron or kettle symbolizes charity and is a reference to the Sikh religious obligation to provide langar, the free distribution of food, to all people, irrespective of an individual's religion, caste or ethnicity. The sword, or (kirpan), represents the warrior code of the Khalsa. The Khanda icon conveys these two principles. The tenets originate from Sikhism's stress on the underlying equality of humankind, sourced from concepts such as earnest work (kirat), food sharing, (vanḍ chako), charity (dān), selfless service (sevā), respect living without starving or begging (pati), communal kitchen (langar).

A translation of the Degh Tegh Fateh into English:

"Victory in war and prosperity in peace have been obtained from Guru Nanak-Gobind Singh. God is one! Victory to the Presence! This is the order of Sri Sachcha Sahib (Note: Sri Sachcha Sahib means "the great master".) to the entire Khalsa. The Guru (Note: Although guru in general means "master" or "teacher", in this text "the Guru" refers specifically to Gobind Singh.) will protect you. Call upon the Guru's name. Your lives will be fruitful! You are the Khalsa of the Great Immortal God. On seeing this anthem, repair to the Presence, wearing five arms. (Note: The "five arms" refers to the Panj Shaster which include the kirpan, the Khanda, the Karud, the Che-Nishanbazi, and the Chakkar.) Observe the rules of conduct laid down for the Khalsa. Do not use bhang, tobocco, poppy, wine, or any other intoxicant ... Commit no theft nor adultery. We have brought Satyug. (Note: Satyug means "golden age".) Love one another. This is my wish. He who lives according to the rules of Khalsa shall be saved by the Guru."

== Adoption and usage ==
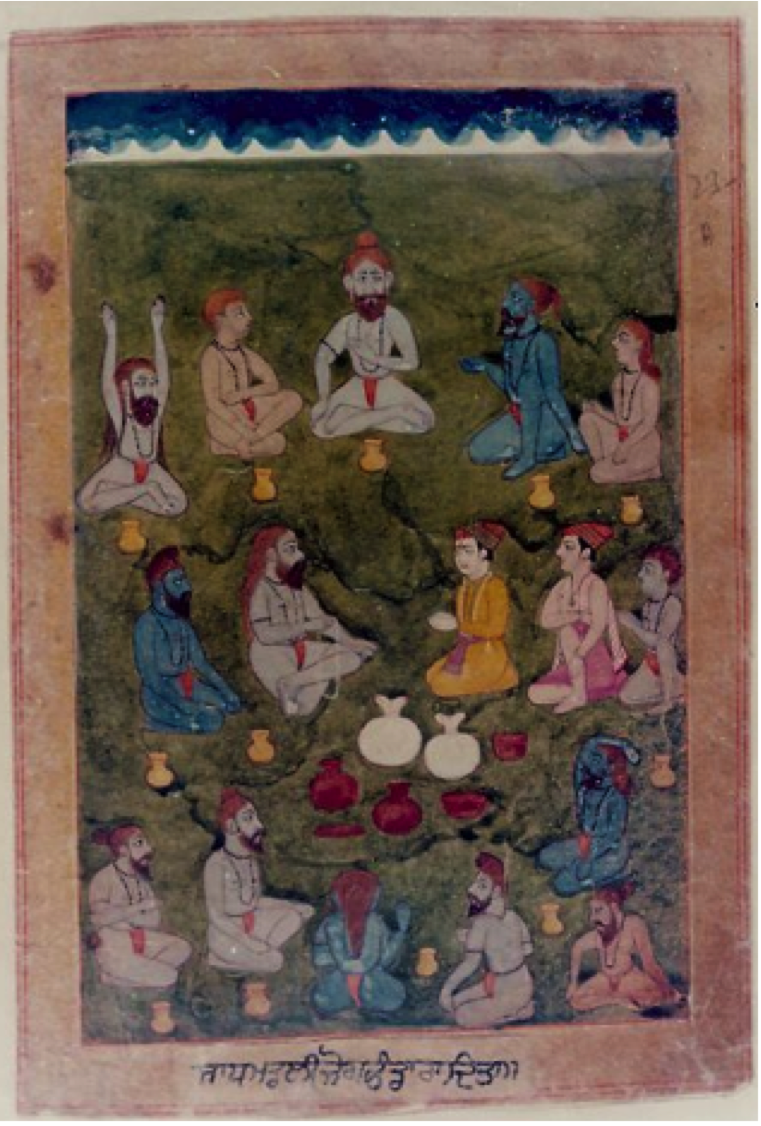
Janamsakhi painting depicting the sacha sauda episode of Guru Nanak's life, when he fed the hungry ascetics

Sikhs have an aversion to a sense of injustice and believe in the welfare of all, including non-Sikhs, with the basic necessities of life (justice and food) being afforded to help achieve this. Guru Nanak is remembered for feeding a group of ascetics. Sikhism had long been imbued with martiality to also reach these aims and in c. 1690 the goals were extended specifically and stressed upon providing food and justice to all as a mission of the Sikh religion. Those who provided food for all were known as deg calāī whilst those who sought justice for everyone were called teġ vāhī. Such persons are remembered in the ardaas prayer.

The symbols of the cauldron and sword were adopted on Sikh flags and coins. The Sikh warrior Banda Singh Bahadur incorporated this slogan into his seal, and Sardar Jassa Singh Ahluwalia struck it into coins in 1764 after decisively defeating the rival Afghans. This inscription was later adopted by the Sikh Misaldar Sardars and rulers on their coins. It was the national anthem of the princely state of Patiala during the Sikh Confederacy. This national anthem had been sung in all the Sikh States until 1948. B.K.S. Nabha describes it in the encyclopedia / dictionary Mahan Kosh (1930). After the annexation of Punjab by the British, the former Sikh coinage became defunct, thus sole focus was paid on continuing the symbolism of degh tegh fateh on the Sikh flag, leading to further developments and stylistic changes.

== See also ==
- Deh Shiva Bar Mohe Eha, Sikh religious hymn and anthem
- Bhog
- Karah Parshad
- Sant Sipahi
- Langar (Sikhism)
