= Sikh coinage =

Since the 18th century

Sikh coinage, known as sikke, refers to the coins issued by various Sikh states for commercial purposes and as symbols of sovereignty. Sikh coinage may vary by region, such as Majha versus Malwa or trans-Sutlej versus cis-Sutlej. Coins from various Sikh states have been discovered, namely Banda's short-lived state, the misls of the Sikh Confederacy, the Sikh Empire, and coins from the Sikh polities of Patiala, Nabha, Jind, Bhadaur, Kaithal, Kalsia, Faridkot, and Buria/Jagadhri. Kapurthala State did not issue their own coinage. Another tradition was Sikh temple-tokens. Some fakes, forgeries, and hoax coins also exist.

== Terminology ==
The Punjabi word for coins is sikkā, which is borrowed from a Persian word, meaning both "a die for coining" and "rule, law, regulation" (implying sovereignty). Coinage issued pre-1777 are termed Gobindshahis whilst coins issued post-1777 are called Nanakshahis. The coinage minted by Patiala State from 1767 onwards are termed Rajeshahis. Coins issued by Jind State are known as Jindias whilst those issued by Nabha State are called Nabhashahis.

Earlier Sikh coinage issued by Banda Singh Bahadur (1709–1715) and misls of the Sikh Confederacy (1748–1799) are termed Gobindshahis. The "Gobindshahi" term conveys the message that they belong to or are dedicated to the tenth Sikh guru, Guru Gobind Singh. Coins struck in the name of the gurus are called Nanakshahis. Coins struck that are related to Bibi Moran are term Moranshahis. Other terminology includes Gurushahi and Nazrana.

== Structure and symbols ==
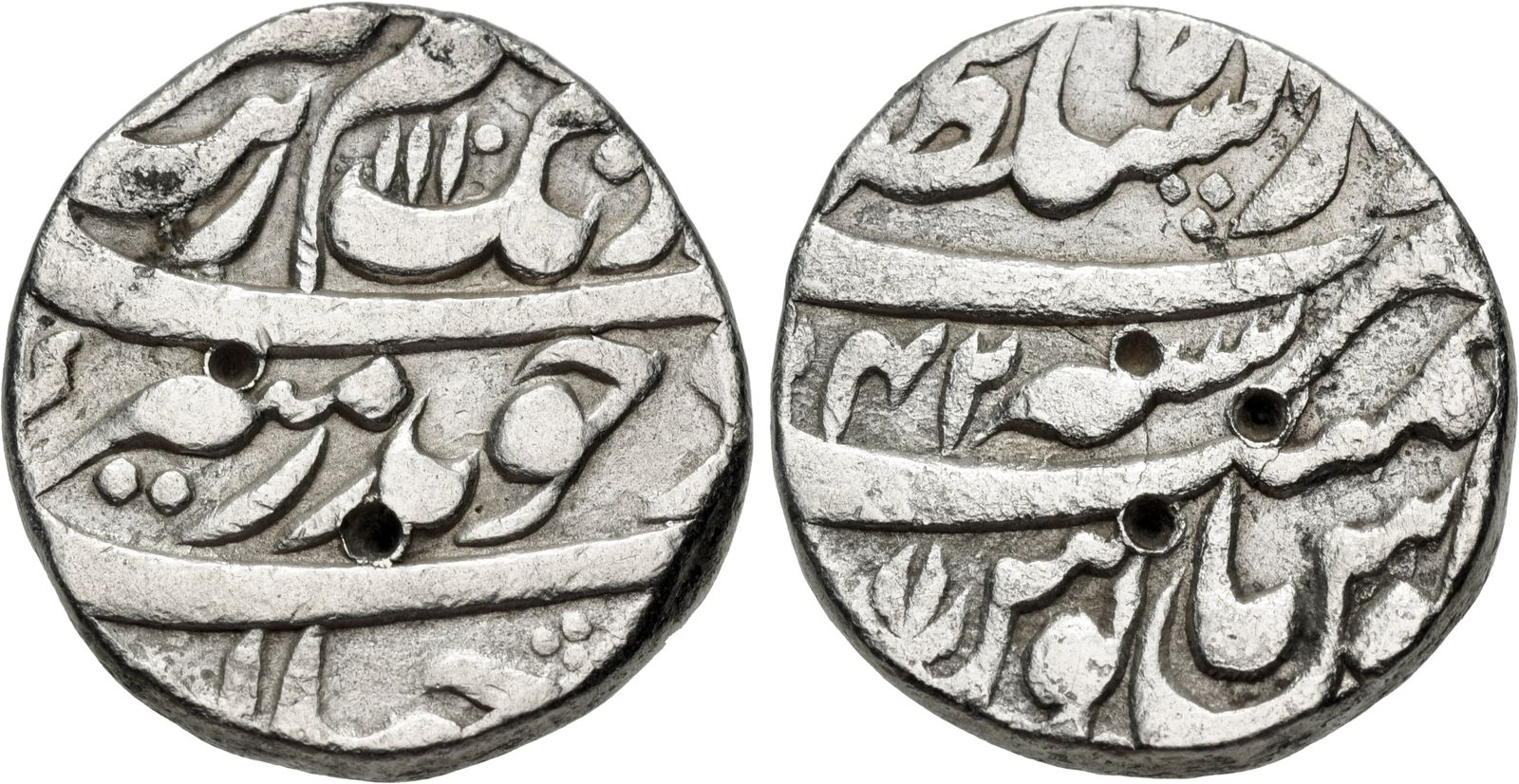
Mughal Empire. Muhyi al-Din Muhammad Aurangzeb Alamgir. AH 1068–1118, AD 1658–1707. AR Rupee (22mm, 11.25 g, 2h). Dar al-Sultanat Lahore mint. Dually dated AH 1110 and RY 42 (AD 1699–1700)

Traditionally in the Punjab, coins struck contained either a bust of or an inscription of the name of the ruler and an inscription on the other side with their reigning years, however Sikh coins differed from the earlier format in-that they do not usually contain information about the ruler under whose reign they were struck, rather being dedicated to the Sikh gurus. Sikhs coins are an imitation of earlier Muslim and Mughal designs, whose prototype consisted of a kalima on one side and the name of the ruler, mint, and date on the other side. Islamic coins did not feature symbols but they did contain legends. In-contrast, the Sikh coins do not bear the name of the ruler under whose reign the coin was struck but they do contain different types of symbols. They also contain legends attributed to the Sikh gurus. For example, Sikh Empire coins contain the legend: Akal Sahai Guru Nanak in various variations and formats, usually abbreviated and rarely in-full. Over-time, verses from the Guru Granth Sahib were inscribed on the coinage. Other symbols used on coins were the tegh (sword), symbolizing justice for all, and the deg (cauldron), representing food for all. The tegh and deg symbols were often counterstruck onto Mughal coins in early Sikh coinage.

Under Maharaja Ranjit Singh (r. 1799/1801–1839), coins bearing the following symbols were created:

- Pipal leaf – a symbol with deep-rooted religious and spiritual meanings in the Indian subcontinent.
- Matsaya (fish) – symbolizing dynastical growth and longevity.
- Shankha (conch-shell) – auspicious sign to divert evil-eye (nazar) and defeat enemies.
- Trisul – veneration of weaponry and divine protection.
- Nisan or Dhavaja (flag) – symbol of authority.
- Chattar (canopy, umbrella, or paiasol) – symbolized royalty and consecrated ensured victory.
- Sat (symbol for purity and truth) – sign of purity and authority.
- Kamal (lotus) – symbol of good-fortune and purity.
- Sakti or Sri (spear) – influence of Shaivist and Shaktist iconography.
- Khadag (sword or sabre) – symbol of valour, strength, and power with the ability to destroy ignorance and injustice.
- Katar (small sword or dagger) – symbol of power and royalty. Many of these symbols bear variations of dots, circles, and other decoratives, whose meanings have been lost.
- Gada or Gurj (staff or club) – martial symbolism.

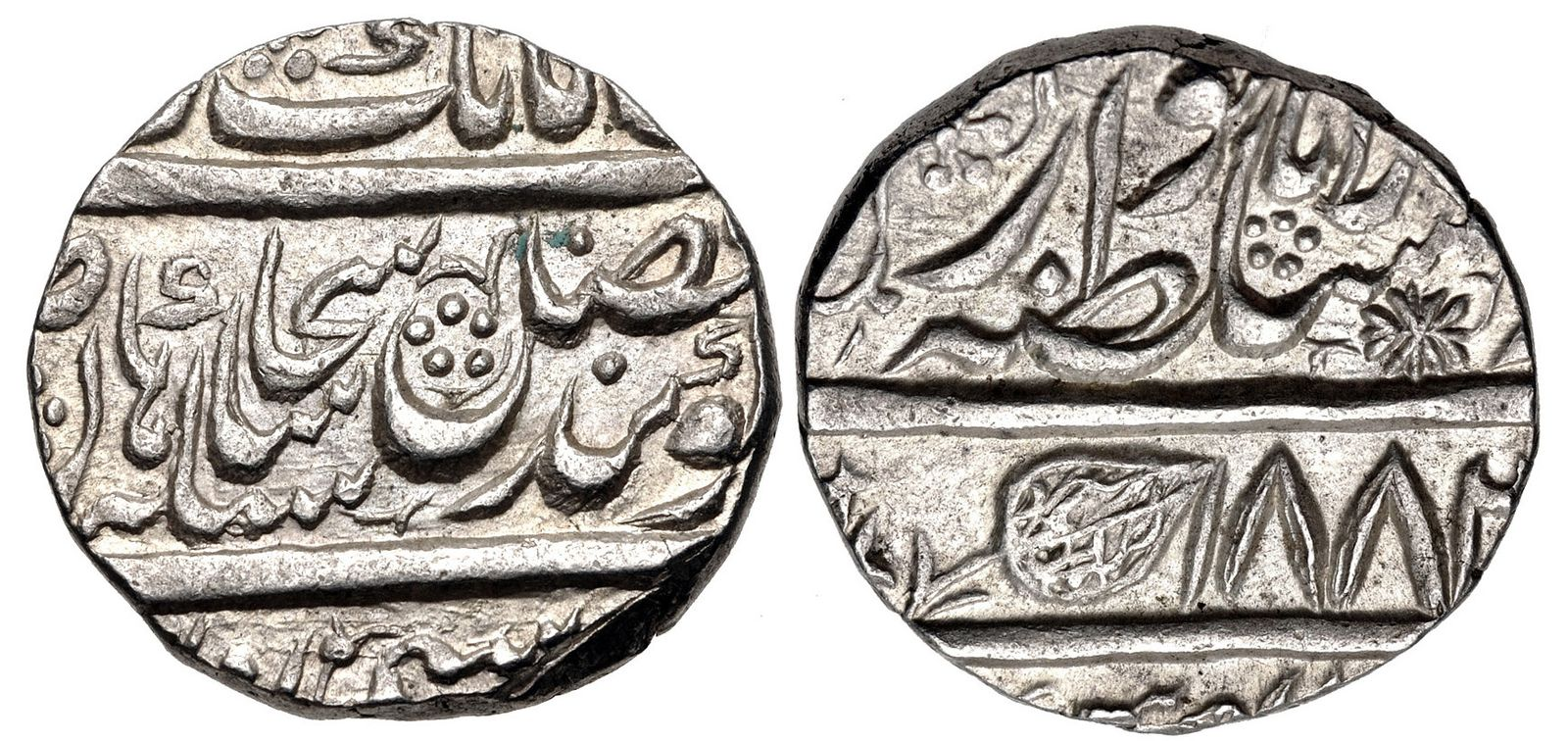
Sikh Empire coin with various symbols, dated VS 1882 (AD 1825–26)

Some have identified possible khanda symbols or their pre-cursors in the Sikh-era coins, although this is controversial. A Mughal coin minted in Lahore during the reign of Bahadur Shah in c. 1711–12 has been identified as possibly containing a khanda symbol, which has been described as an enigma. Hans Herrli believes the supposed khandas are actually misidentified lotus symbols or recent counter-marks.

== Mints ==
Various mints were used by the Sikhs throughout their history, some mints which have been identified are:

- Khalsa Mint (Mukhlisgarh)
- Lahore Mint
- Multan Mint
- Amritsar Mint
- Anandgarh Mint
- Ahluwalia Mint
- Kashmir Mint
- Mankera Mint
- Mozang Mint
- Derajat Mint
- Peshawar Mint
- Dera Mint
- Nimak Mint
- Jhang Mint
- Najibabad Mint
- Islam Garh Mint (Gujrat)

== Dates ==
The dates on Sikh coins normally correspond to the traditional Bikrami calendar, which is usually 57 years ahead of the Gregorian calendar (except during January to April, where it is ahead by only 56 years).

== Language ==
The predominant language of Sikh coinage was Persian. As for scripts, Sikh Empire-era coinage contain examples of both Gurmukhi and Perso-Arabic scripts.

== History ==
=== Banda Singh Bahadur ===
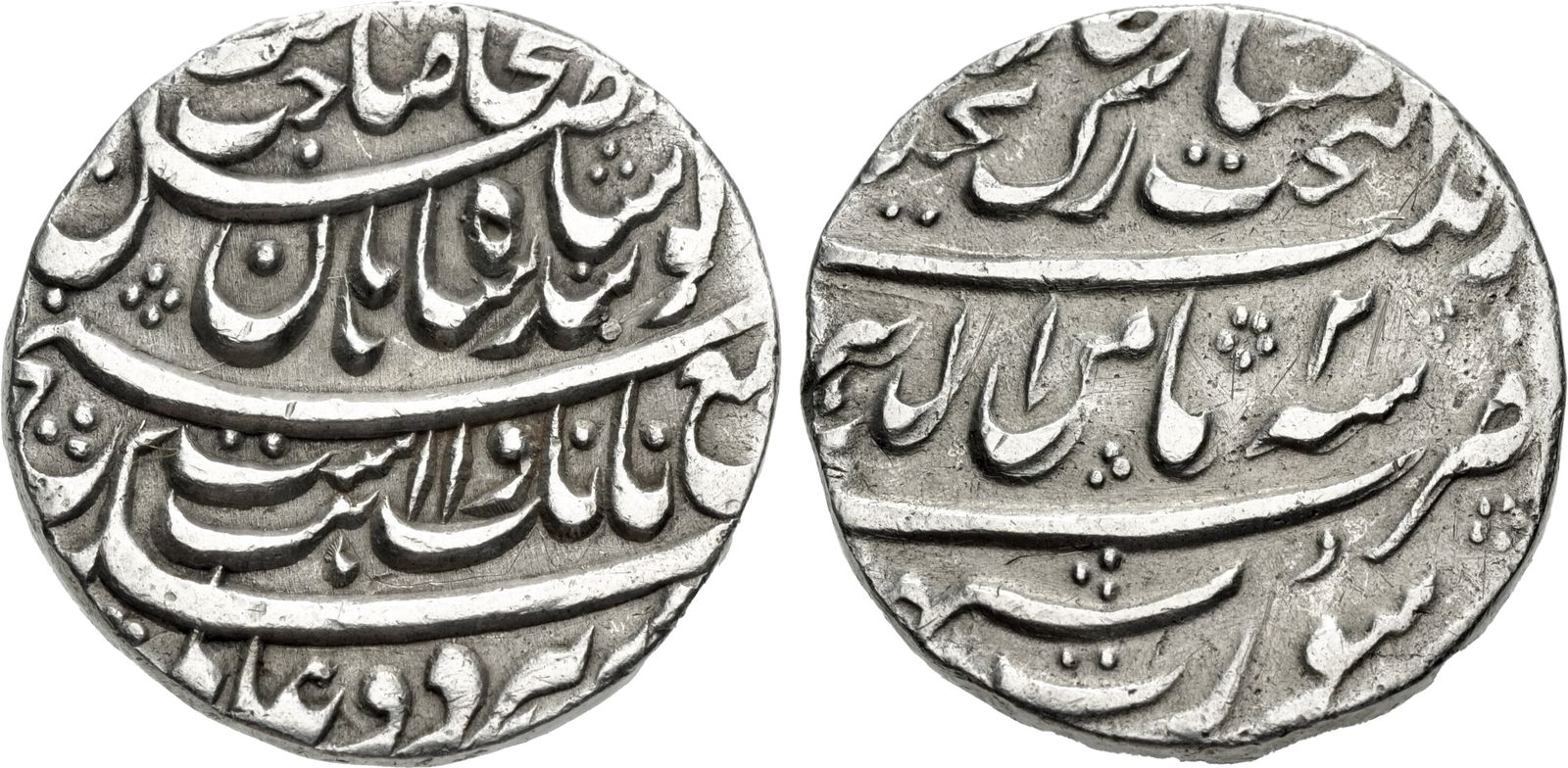
Sikhs (Khalsa Fauj). Baba Banda Singh Bahadur. 1670–1716. AR Rupee (25mm, 11.98 g, 6h). Amritsar mint. Dated Year 2 (AD 1711). VF.

In early 1710, Sikh forces conquered the Sirhind Sarkar. Thus, Sikhs first had access to their own mint in 1710. The first coinage struck by the Sikhs was by Banda Singh Bahadur at his fortress in Mukhlisgarh in Himalayan foothills. His coins feature the names of the first and tenth gurus of Sikhism, along with the date of mintage.

The first Sikh coin struck by Banda Singh Bahadur bore the following inscriptions:

Original (Persian)

sikkā bar har do'alam tegh-i-nānak wāhab ast fatah gobind singh shāh-i-shāhān fazal sachehā sahib ast

(obverse)

zarb ba amān ud-dahr musawarat shahr zinat al takht mubārak bakht

(reverse)

Translation:
Translation (English)

"the coin is struck in the two worlds, its bestower being the sword of Nānak. Victory is of Gobind Singh, the king of kings, by the grace of the True Master"

(obverse)

"struck for the security and peace of the world and the walled town of the elegant throne and blessed fortune".

(reverse)

=== Sikh Confederacy ===
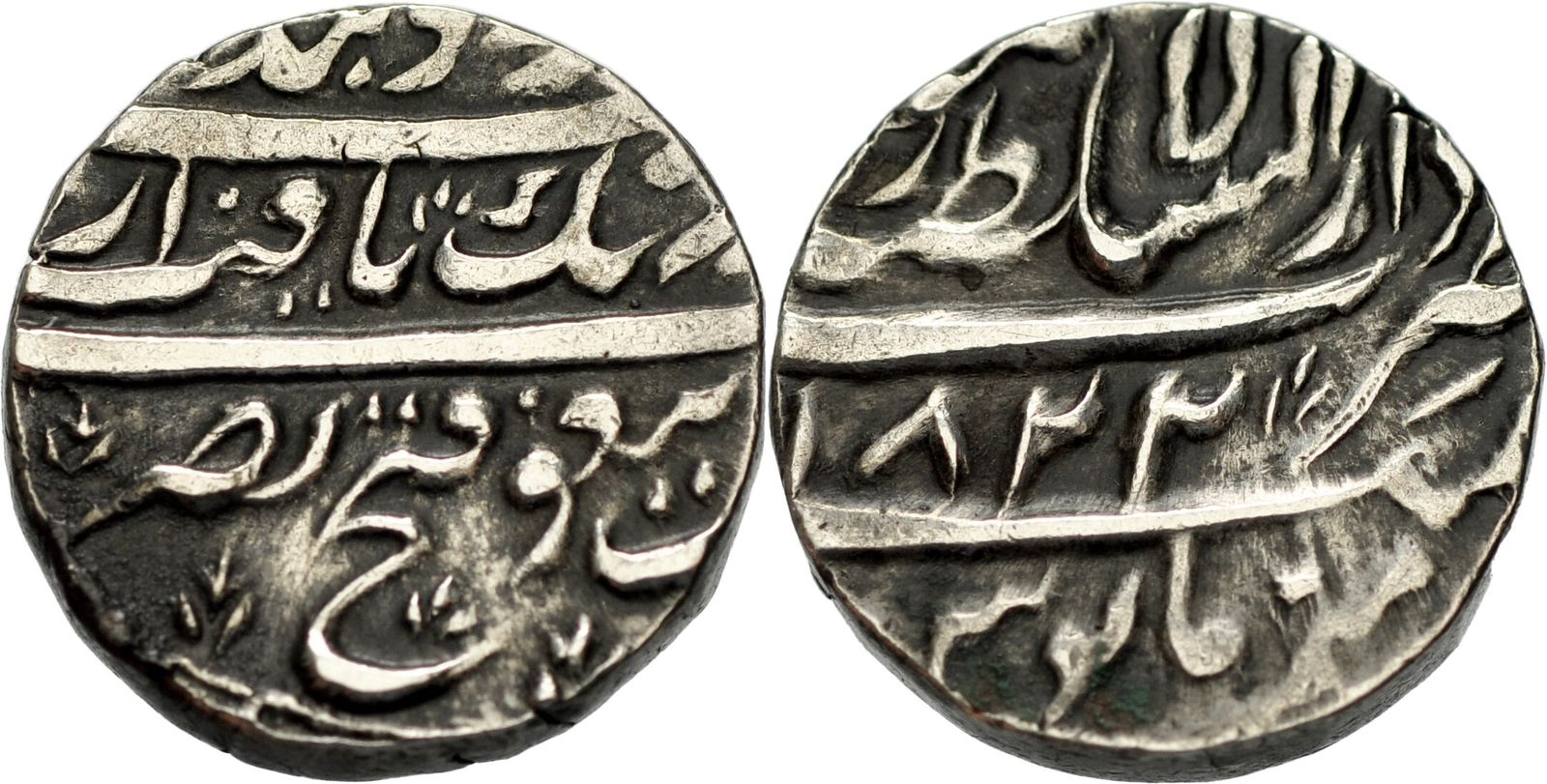
Sikh Confederacy (Misls). Anonymous. AR Gobindshahi Rupee (20.7mm, 11.38 g, 5h). Dar al-Sultanat Lahore mint. Dated VS 1822 (AD 1765).

The Dal Khalsa of the Sikh Confederacy, under the command of Jassa Singh Ahluwalia, occupied Lahore in November 1761. During that time, a coin was struck bearing an inscription with Jassa Singh Ahluwalia's name. Its inscription was: sikkā zad dar jahān bafazl i-akāl, mulki- ahmad shāh griftah jassā kalal ("the coin struck in the world [when] by the grace of God, Jassā Kalāl [Jassa Singh Ahluwalia] occupied the territory of Ahmad Shah [Durrani]"). However, this coin was soon re-called because it was struck in the name of an individual Sikh instead of a Sikh guru and the Jassa's name was truncated. Another viewpoint is that this coin was struck by non-Sikhs religious leaders of Lahore as a forgery and sent to Ahmad Shah in-order to invoke his wrath and lead him to campaign against the Sikhs.

After the Sikhs conquered the Sirhind Sarkar in 1764, a type of silver coin was struck that came to be known as the Gobindshāhī sikkā ("coin of Guru Gobind Singh"). Its issuance by the Lahore Mint continued until 1777. The inscriptions on the coin, showing influence from Banda's earlier coins, mention the deg tegh fateh concept of Sikhism, mentions both Guru Nanak and Guru Gobind Singh by name, and name Lahore as a capital of the Sikhs. Coinage minted at Amritsar from 1777 onwards are termed Nānakshāhī sikkā. They contain inscriptions, containing the Sikh term Akal Sahai, written in Gurmukhi on one side, and also a verse relating to the first and tenth gurus. The other side contained information about where the coin was struck, such as at the Akal Takht in Amritsar in the case of a 1780 example.

When the Sikhs conquered the Ganges-Yamuna Doab and occupied Delhi, sicca falus (copper) coins were struck at the Najibabad mint. In-regards to misl-era Sikh coins, C. J. Rodgers stated:

It is not astonishing then that there are coins in existence on one side of which is the old Sikh coin distich and on the other the Najibabad mint name and mark. One coin of this kind is known with the Jaipur mint name and mark.... I remember seeing years ago a coin struck at Surat with the Sikh coin couplet on it...

— Charles J. Rodgers, Coin Collection in Northern India (1894)

=== Sikh Empire ===
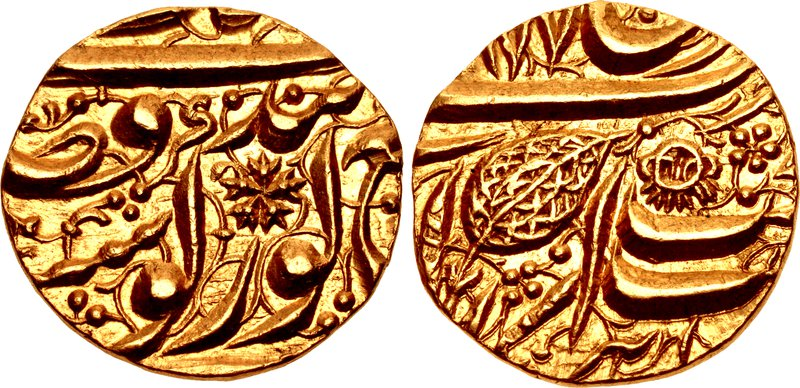
Coin of Maharaja Ranjit Singh, minted in Amritsar, dated 1820

Ranjit Singh occupied Lahore in 1799 and started issuing coinage there from 1801 onwards, from Amritsar since 1805–06, from Multan since 1818, and from Kashmir (Srinagar) since 1819. Coins were also struck at Pind Dadan Khan, Jhang, and Peshawar. Ranjit Singh's coinage are more similar in-regards to their inscriptions to the earlier Gobindshahi coins yet they are still classified as Nanakshahi coins. The contemporary term for the currency was Nanakshahi. A distinguishing feature of his coins is that they feature symbols like tree leaves and later-on peacock feathers. Coins that were struck on a mint's first day of operation were first sent to the Akal Takht in Amritsar as an offering.

There were various kinds of coins:

- Gold coins: mohars/butkis
- Silver coins: rupee
- Copper coins: dhelā, takā, and paisā

Sikh Empire-era coins continue the older Sikh coinage traditions that had been established by Banda Singh Bahadur whilst also introducing newer ideas, mostly due to Hindu influence. Maharaja Ranjit Singh continued the practice of not striking coins in the name of a ruler, rather coins were struck in the sacred names of the Sikh gurus. The coins contain benedictions for the Sikh gurus with various signs and symbols. The pipal leaf symbol was the predominant one used on his coins. The Sikh Empire maintained older Sikh numismatic themes but also introduced newer designs from Hinduism, namely the Vaishnavite, Shaivist, and Shaktist denominations. Some of the Sikh Empire's coinage bear Hindu motifs and symbolism, which Madanjit Kaur attributes to Hindu revivalism in the Punjab region during the 19th century. Sikh Empire coins utilized both the Gurmukhi and Perso-Arabic scripts. The Sikh Empire's coinage would later go-on to influence the coinage of the Dogra state of Jammu and Kashmir, founded by Gulab Singh. Some coins struck bear symbolism related to Bibi Moran, the Muslim wife of Ranjit Singh, these coins are termed Morānshāhīs or Ārsī dī Mohar Vāle. The Moranshahis were struck from 1806 to 1807 but they were not accepted as an offering at the Akal Takht due to them being struck in honour of a Muslim dancing-girl. Similarly, some coins struck during the reign of Sher Singh (r. 1841–43) were also not accepted by Takht Kesgarh Sahib in Anandpur as an offering due to them featuring Akal Sahai Sher Singh instead of the usual Akal Sahai Guru Nanak ji inscription. Meanwhile, Hari Singh Nalwa was allowed to issue coins in his name on two occasions, in Kashmir in 1831 and in Peshawar in 1834.

Rai Kanhiya Lal claimed that Ranjit Singh started striking coins as soon as he occupied Lahore, with him issuing a coin bearing a Persian couplet praising the Sikh gurus on the obverse side and his own name on the reverse side, with him distributing the coin to the poor. However, according to Surinder Singh this is a false account, although Ranjit Singh did issue a coin bearing the a Persian couplet praising Sikh gurus on the obverse side and an effigy of him seeking Nanak's blessings on the reverse side in the later part of his reign. An account of this can also be found in Sohan Lal Suri's Umdat-ut-Tawarikh.

From 1828 onwards, the Lahore Mint began minting golden mohars called butkīs, which consisted of 11-1/2 māshās (around 10 grams) of pure gold. The silver rupee contained a comparable amount of silver. A distinguishing characteristic of the butkis is that while they contained the usual inscriptions, they also contained the term Waheguru written three times in Gurmukhi script. The Sikh Empire also circulated quarter-rupees (¼ rupee).

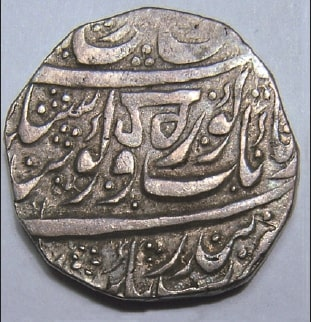
Coins minted during the Sikh rule (1820–1846) in Subah Kashmir were called 'Hari Singhee'. (Obverse) bears the Gobindshahi couplet in Farsi and is inscribed Har in Gurmukhi.

The main mints operated by the Sikh Empire were located at Amritsar, Anandgarh, Lahore, Peshawar, Multan, Jammu, and Kashmir. Some of the various symbols on the coinage, such as swords, daggers, or lotus flowers, may have represented specific governors of the different provinces of the empire. The banyan leaf symbolized the empire of Ranjit Singh on the coins.

=== Cis-Sutlej states ===
There were various states in the cis-Sutlej tract that issued their own coinage, such as Patiala, Nabha, Jind, Kaithal, Kalsia, and Malerkotla. Many of these states belonged to the Phulkian dynasty, although not all of them. The coins of the Phulkian states commonly share elements of floral (bud and flower) decoration and symbolism. It is possible that coinage may have been issued also by the Sikh states of Badaur, Malaudh, and Faridkot, with Bhadaur being the strongest candidate and there being existing reports of coins being struck there. However, no coins of Bhadaur had come to light until Jeevandeep Singh identified a recently uncovered rupee coin struck between 1805 and 1815 during the reign of Bir Singh of Bhadaur.

Ala Singh had been recognized by Ahmad Shah Abdali as a ruler in 1761, with Abdali bestowing him with the raja title in 1765. The first coin issued by Ala Singh bears the date A.H. 1178 / R.Y. 19 (c. 1764–1765). As Ala Singh was the governor of Sirhind, the coins bear the name of Sirhind, although they were actually minted at Patiala. Ala Singh's successor, Amar Singh, received the Rajah-i-Rajgan title and permission to issue coinage from Abdali in March 1767 onwards. These coins, called Rajeshahis, were gold mohurs and silver rupees (approx. 10 grams or 11-1/4 mashas) that bore Persian inscriptions bearing the name of Ahmad Shah Abdali.

After Sikh victory in Lahore and decline of Durrani administration in the Punjab, the rest of the Sikh polities of the cis-Sutlej region started to mint their own coinage modelled after Patiala, with the name of the mint being kept as Sirhind and inscribing them in the name of Ahmad Shah Abdali. The coins of the states of Patiala, Nabha, and Jind were recorded by R. C. Temple in The Indian Antiquary in November 1889. Kaithal and Malerkotla also issued their own coinage.

All the Maharajas of Patiala have used the same couplet in their gold and silver coins. Different Maharajas have used different signs, and it is by these that the coins are assigned to those who struck them.. ..One strange thing is noteworthy. The mint is in Patiala city, but the name of the mint coming on the coin is Sarhind or Sahrind. When we consider that the Maharaja is a Sikh and the Sikhs account Sarhind accursed... the retention of the name seems stranger still. Ahmad Shah Durrani coined in this town, and that is perhaps the reason its name is retained on Patiala coins.

— Charles J. Rodgers [Honorary Numismatist to the Government of India] (1894)

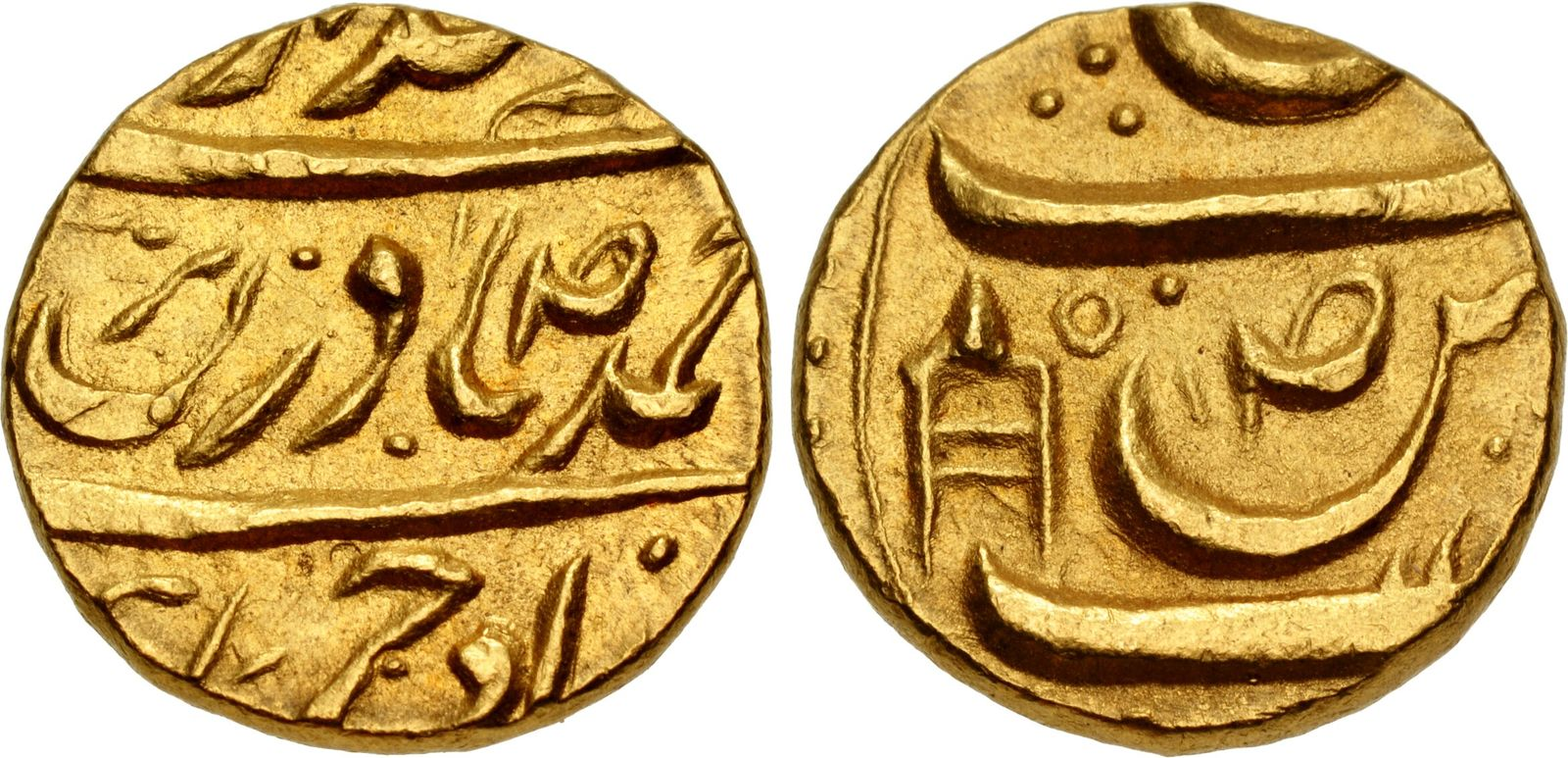
Patiala. Maharaja Sir Rajindar Singh. VS 1933-1957 (AD 1876–1900). AV Mohur (20mm, 10.66 g, 11h). Sirhind mint. Dated VS (19)50 (AD 1893).

However, the early coins of the Phulkian states are difficult to attribute and there are minor variations which can be used to distinguish them from one another. They also tended to have loose-control over their mints, which decreased the values of the coins in the Delhite markets. These states paid a tribute to the Maratha Empire until the Marathas were defeated by the British in the 2nd Anglo-Maratha war of 1805. By 1809, the British became the hegemonic power in the cis-Sutlej region and most of the polities in the area signed treaties with the British, which helped check Ranjit Singh's southward expansion past the Sutlej. This shift is also reflected in the coinage of the era, with there being a change toward more clearly defined symbolism and refined fabric.

Jind State only issued a silver rupee, known as a Jīndīā, which were comparable to Patiala's currency in both weightage and inscription. Nabha State issued both a gold mohur and silver rupee, collectively known as Nābhāshāhīs, their inscription bore the deg tegh fateh phrase and thus were similar to Maharaja Ranjit Singh's coinage inscriptions on his Nanakshahis and the earlier Gobindshahis of the Misls.

=== Trans-Sutlej states ===
Manohar Singh Marco states that Kapurthala State did not strike their own coinage, instead using Nanakshahis in earlier-periods and British Indian currency in the colonial-period. However, Jeevandeep Singh states that coins with Sikh couplets were struck during the reign of Fateh Singh Ahluwalia of Kapurthala, who had exchanged his turban with Maharaja Ranjit Singh. Kaputhala State was neither allied to the Durranis or the Phulkians, instead allying with the Sikh Empire.

=== British period ===
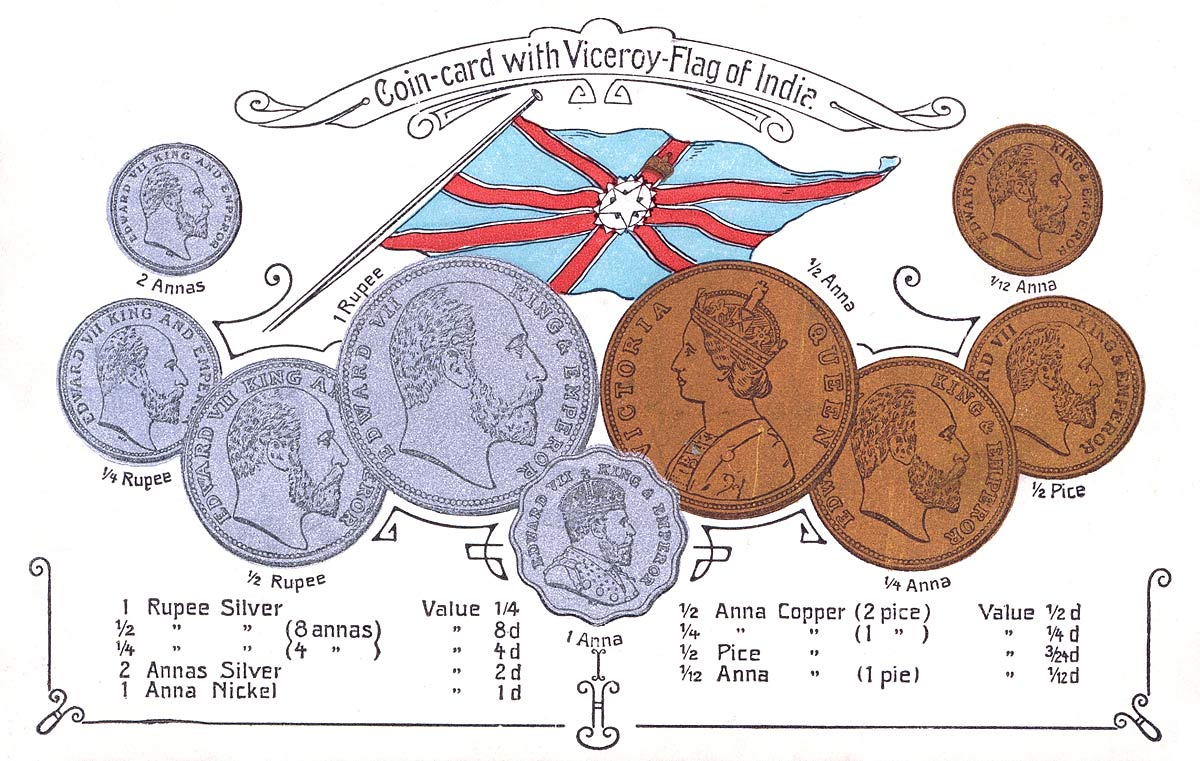
An early postcard summarizing the value of British Indian coinage, one rupee and below, in silver and copper, c. 1905

After the annexation of the Sikh Empire in 1849, the British replaced the local currencies with their own honouring Queen Victoria. Many formerly circulated Sikh coins were melted down, with much having disappeared by the 1850s. However, the Sikh-ruled princely states continued to issue their own coinage. However, Kapurthala State did not strike their own coinage, instead using Nanakshahis in earlier-periods and British Indian currency in the colonial-period. Coinage issued by the Sikh princely-states were only valid legal-tender within their territory, however sometimes neighbouring markets close to the border of the state accepted them.

=== Khalistan movement ===
Some currencies were issued by various Khalistani outfits during the Punjab insurgency of the 1980s and 1990s. These were propaganda and fundraising "notes" issued by Sikhs separatists in North America. Jagjit Singh Chohan, founder, and Balbir Singh Sandhu, the Secretary General of the National Council of Khalistan, issued unofficial stamps and currency of Khalistan, which was reported in 1981. Khalistan issues were not official banknotes and the 5 and 10 dollar bills were donation receipts. The other notes were supposedly printed as a possible currency and later used for promotional reasons. The banknotes were also printed and distributed for propaganda purposes, for example by Surjan Singh Gill's campaign from Vancouver. Aside from currency, Gill also printed Khalistan passports. A supposed Khalistan consulate in Cologne, Germany issued Khalistan money and passports. These attempts were heavily criticized by the Indian government.

== Numismatics ==
Claude-Auguste Court, a firangi general of the Sikh Empire, had a coin collection. The first serious study of Sikh coinage was carried-out by Charles J. Rodgers, who was posted at Normal College in Amritsar for a decade after the British annexation of the Punjab. Most research work since then is based ultimately off of Rodger's original publication in 1881 covering Sikh coinage. After Rodgers, there was no serious interest in Sikh numimastics until the 1960s and beyond. Some scholars and researchers of the field who have written literature on the subject include Hari Ram Gupta, Gulshan Lal Chopra, Ranjit Singh Kharag, John S. Deyell, Stan Goron, Ken Wiggins, Madanjit Kaur, and Parmeshwari Lai Gupta.

== Collections ==
- Sikh History Research Centre
- Madanjit Kaur Collection
- Gurpal Singh Bhuller Collection
- Jeevandeep Singh Collection
- SSB Collection
- Panjab Digital Library
- Virasat-e-Khalsa Heritage Museum

== See also ==
- Coinage of India
