= Khanda (Sikh symbol) =

Sikh symbol depicting Deg Tegh Fateh doctrine

The Khanda, a symbol of Sikhs

The Khanda (Punjabi: ਖੰਡਾ, romanized: khaṇḍā), also known as the Khalsa crest, is the symbol of Sikhism. It can be found on Sikh flags, decorating them in the middle. It attained its current form around the 1930s during the Ghadar Movement.

== Description ==
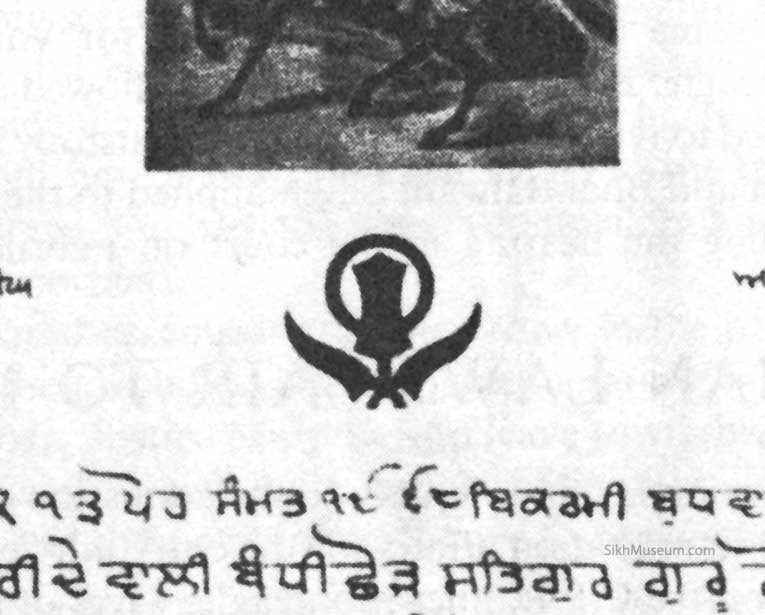
Early Khanda design from a promotional flyer advertising the upcoming birthday celebration of Guru Gobind Singh, Vancouver, Canada, December 1911.

The modern Sikh symbol is never written on or in any copy of the Guru Granth Sahib. The main symbol traditionally used in the Guru Granth Sahib and gurdwaras around the world is "Ik Onkar". Traditionally, it was very common to see "Ik Onkar" above the entrance to a gurdwara, or on the front page of the Guru Granth Sahib. The other one was the Ardh Chand.

It is an amalgam of 3 symbols:

- A double-edged khanda (sword) in the centre
- A chakkar (chakram)
- Two single-edged daggers, or kirpan, crossed at the bottom, which sit on either side of the khanda and chakkar. They represent the dual characteristics of Miri-Piri, indicating the integration of both spiritual and temporal sovereignty together and not treating them as two separate and distinct entities. The left sword is called Miri and the right sword is called Piri.

It depicts the Sikh doctrine Deg Tegh Fateh in emblematic form. It consists of three weapons and a circle: the khanda, two kirpans and the chakkar which is a sharp circular throwing weapon. Deg Teg Fateh (Punjabi: ਦੇਗ ਤੇਗ਼ ਫ਼ਤਿਹ), or Victory to Charity and Arms) is a Sikh slogan and the title of an anthem in the Punjabi language that signifies the dual obligations of the Khalsa: The responsibility to provide food, and to provide protection, for the needy and oppressed. Deg refers to the "cauldron" and Tegh to the "sword". The cauldron or kettle symbolises charity and is a reference to the Sikh religious obligation to provide langar, the free distribution of food, to all people, irrespective of an individual's religion, caste or ethnicity. The sword, or (kirpan), represents the warrior code of the Khalsa. The Khanda icon conveys these two principles. It is the military emblem of the Sikhs. It is also part of the design of the Nishan Sahib. A double-edged khanda (sword) is placed at the top of a Nishan Sahib flag as an ornament or finial.

In recent years, the Khanda has been used to show solidarity within the Sikh community after high-profile shootings in the United States.

Another symbol that may be confused with the Khanda is the aad chand (lit. 'half moon') of the Nihang, which consists of a khanda sword in the middle of a crescent, aligned with points upward.

== Character encodings and emoji ==
The symbol is encoded in Unicode, at code point U+262C ☬ ADI SHAKTI in the Miscellaneous Symbols block, and at U+1FAAF 🪯 KHANDA in the Symbols and Pictographs Extended-A block; the latter was added in Unicode 15.0 in 2022, and defaults to colour emoji presentation. The approach of using a separate code point, rather than using an emoji variation sequence, was taken in this case since the use of variation sequences for emoji is now regarded as having been a mistake to begin with, although Samsung had already implemented a colour glyph for U+262C since 2013.
