= Sant Sipahi =

Spiritual and martial Sikh

A Sant Sipahi (Punjabi: ਸੰਤ-ਸਿਪਾਹੀ, romanized: Sant Sipāhī, lit. 'Saint-Soldier') is a Sikh that aims to become both spiritually and martially skilled, as per the teachings of the sixth Sikh Guru, Guru Hargobind. Guru Hargobind is credited with the initial militarization of the Sikhs, and the term represents an ideological shift brought on by the execution of his father and predecessor, Guru Arjan Dev, by the Mughal Emperor Jahangir, for his refusal to convert to Islam and alter Sikh scripture. As per the Khalsa perspective, a sant-sipahi is the ideal form of a Sikh.

Guru Gobind Singh, the tenth Guru, solidified the concept of a Sant Sipahi with the founding of the Khalsa. The militarization of Sikhs was further enhanced by the development of Shastar Vidya, the Sikh martial art.

A Sant Sipahi is meant to embrace Sikh religious and spiritual philosophy, while being prepared to use necessary violence to defend the rights of the innocent. They are to have the wisdom of a saint and the courage of a warrior. A Sant Sipahi is not permitted to use their martial skills in pursuit of material gain or personal glory.

== See also ==
- Miri piri
