= Gurpurab =

Sikh celebration of a Guru's birthday

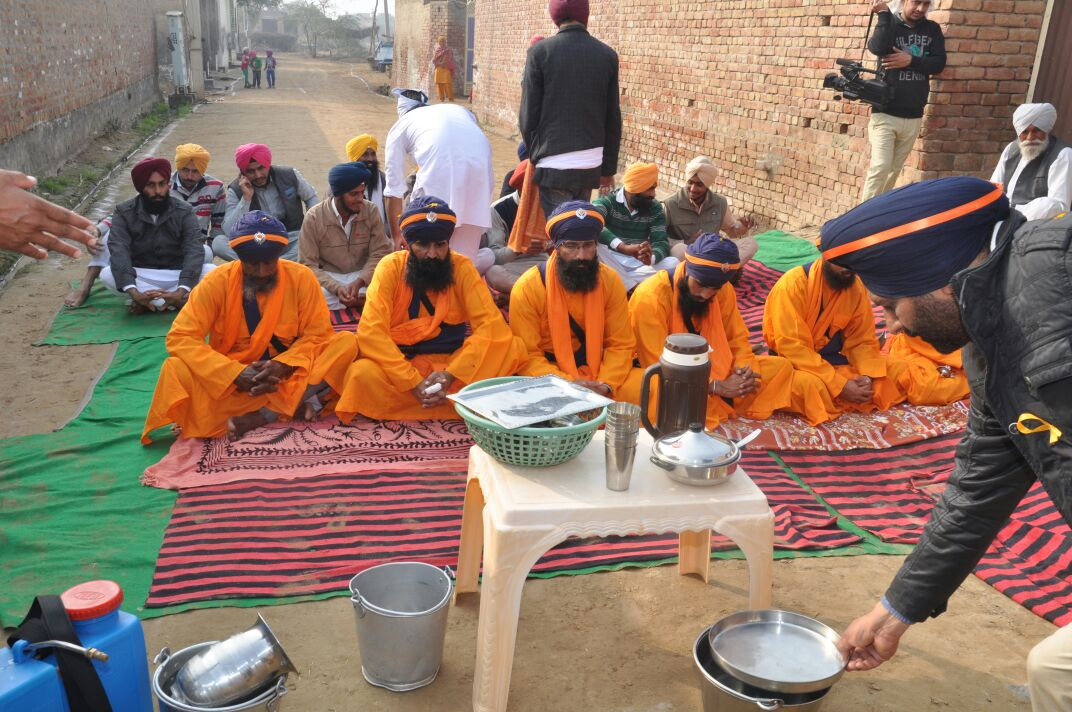
Gurpurab observance, with the Panj Pyare, in Bhangala, Punjab, India

Gurpurab (Punjabi: ਗੁਰਪੁਰਬ (Gurmukhi)), alternatively spelt as Gurpurb, in Sikh tradition is a celebration of an anniversary of a Guru's birth marked by the holding of a festival. The celebration is also known as a Prakash Purab or Prakash Parv.

== Gurpurab of Guru Nanak ==
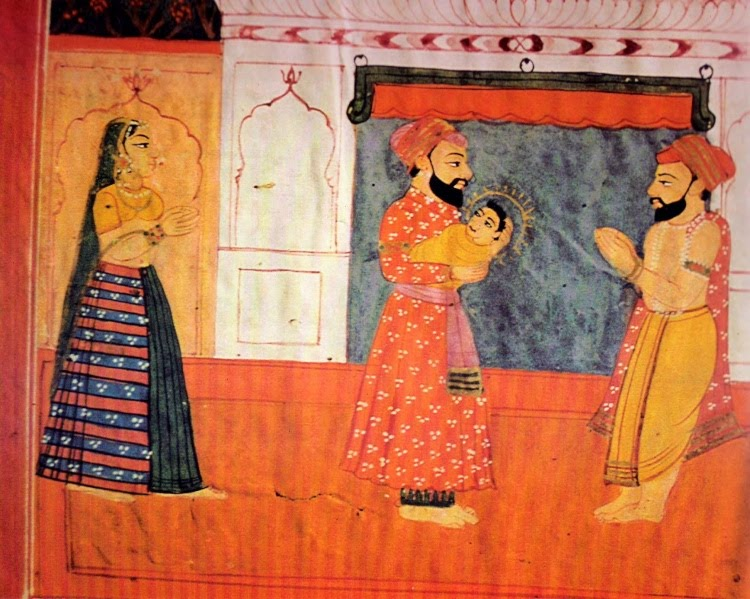
Depiction of Guru Nanak's birth from a Janamsakhi painting. The painting shows the Muslim midwife Daultan, Mehta Kalu (Guru Nanak's father) holding baby Nanak, and lastly Pandit Hardayal

The birthday of Guru Nanak, the founder of the Sikh religion, comes in the month of November, but the date varies from year to year according to the lunar Indian calendar. The birthday celebrations last three days. Generally two days before the birthday, Akhand Path is performed in the Gurdwaras. One day before the birthday, a procession is organised which is led by the Panj Piare and the Palki (Palanquin) of Guru Granth Sahib and followed by teams of singers singing hymns, brass bands playing different tunes, 'Gatka' (martial art) teams show their swordsmanship, and processionists singing the chorus. The procession passes through the main roads and streets of the town which are covered with buntings and decorated gates and the leaders inform the people of the message of Guru Nanak. On the anniversary day, the programme begins early in the morning at about 4 or 5 am with the singing of Asa di Var (morning hymns) and hymns from the Sikh scriptures followed by Katha (exposition of the scripture) and lectures and recitation of poems in praise of the Guru. The celebrations go on till about 2 pm.

After Ardas and distribution of Karah Parshad, a special Langar is served on the day of Gurpurab. Some Gurdwaras also hold night prayer sessions. This begins around sunset when Rehras (evening prayer) is recited. This is followed by Kirtan till late in the night. Sometimes a Kavi-darbar (poetic symposium) is also held to enable the poets to pay their tributes to the Guru in their own verses. At about 1:20 am, the actual time of the birth, the congregation starts singing Gurbani. The function ends about 2 am.

The Sikhs who cannot join the celebrations for some reason, or in places where there are no Gurdwaras, hold the ceremony in their own homes by performing Kirtan, Path, Ardas, Karah Parsad and Langar.

== Gurpurabs for other Gurus ==
Guru Gobind Singh, the tenth Guru's birthday generally falls in December or January. The celebrations are similar to those of Guru Nanak's birthday, namely Akhand Path, procession and Kirtan, Katha, and Langar.

The martyrdom anniversary of Guru Arjan, the fifth Guru, falls in May or June, the hottest months in India. He was tortured to death under the orders of Mughal Emperor, Jahangir, at Lahore on 25 May 1606. Celebrations consist of Kirtan, Katha, lectures, Karah Parsad and Langar in the Gurdwara. Because of summer heat, chilled sweetened drink made from milk, sugar, essence and water, called chhabeel is freely distributed in Gurdwaras and in neighbourhoods to everybody irrespective of their religious beliefs.

Guru Tegh Bahadur, the ninth Guru, was arrested under orders of Mughal Emperor, Aurangzeb. As he refused to change his religion and accept Islam, he was beheaded on 11 November 1675 at Chandi Chowk, Delhi. Usually one-day celebrations of his martyrdom are organised in the Gurdwaras.

Three days before his death, Guru Gobind Singh conferred on 3 October 1708, the guruship of the Sikhs on Guru Granth Sahib. On this day, special one-day celebrations are organised with Kirtan, Katha, lectures, Ardas, Karah Parsad and Langar. Sikhs rededicate themselves to follow the teachings of the Gurus contained in the scripture. In 2008, the tercentenary of this Gurpurab, popularized as 300 Saal Guru de Naal was celebrated by the Sikhs worldwide with the main celebrations held at Hazur Sahib, Nanded.

== See also ==
- Guru Gaddi
- Joti Jot
- Ganga Sagar (urn)
- Sikhism

== Sources ==
- Concepts In Sikhism
