= Chandu Shah =

Mughal official

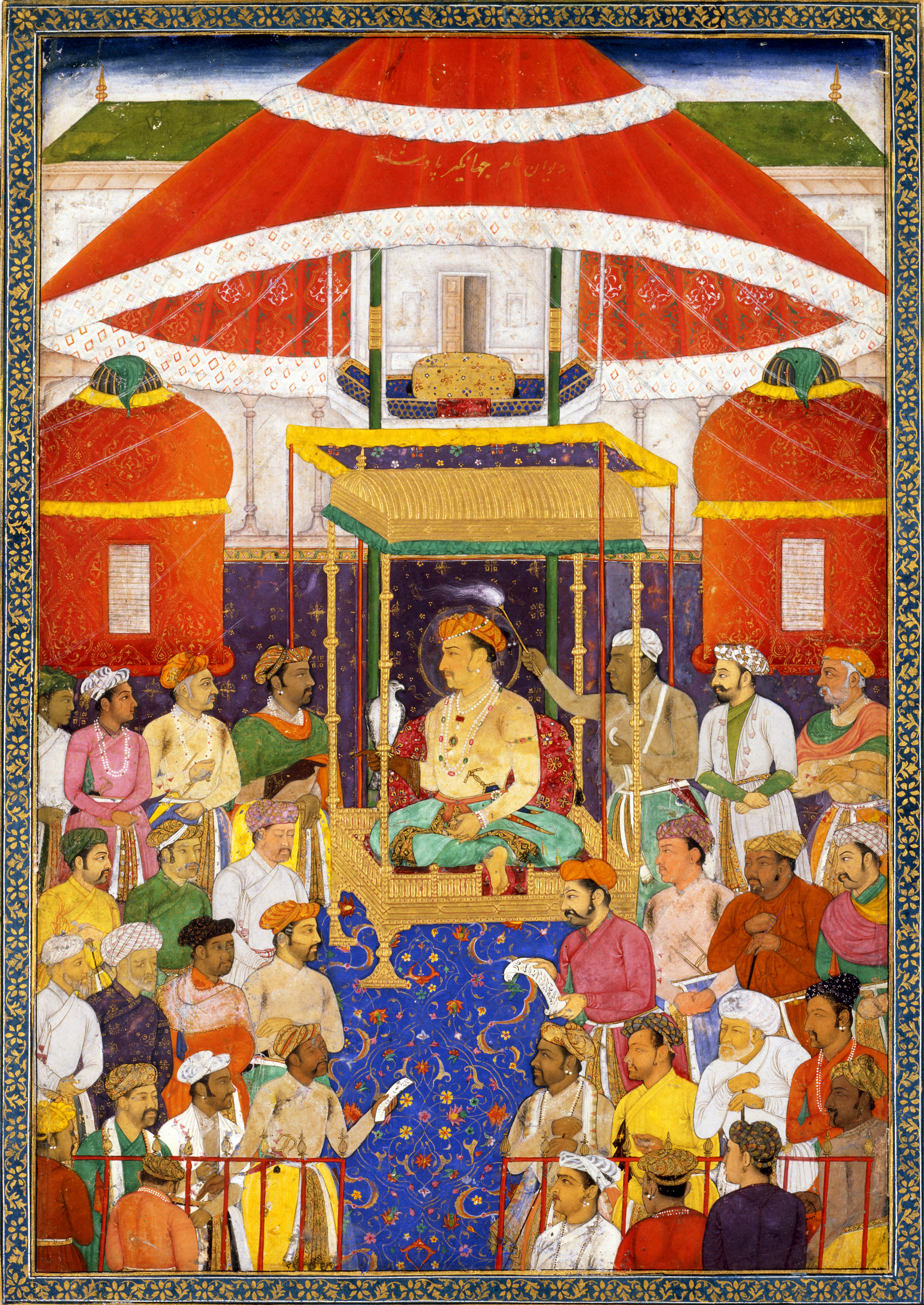
Darbar of Jahangir with officials, ca.1620

Chandu Shah (fl. late 16th and early 17th century, alternatively known as Chandu Lal and Chandu Mal) is a man who features in Sikh historical accounts. Sikh tradition holds that he was an affluent banker and revenue official of the Mughal emperors from Lahore who conspired against the fifth Sikh guru, Guru Arjan.

== Biography ==
He was from a Sahi (Shahi) Khatri background and was in the service of the Subahdar (Governor) of Lahore province. His hostility towards the Guru began when he was severely miffed by the rejection of his marital proposal that the Guru's son, Hargobind, be wed to his daughter. He initially appealed to Emperor Akbar to punish the Guru based on a false complaint but this fell on deaf ears as Akbar had a high-opinion of Arjan. After Akbar's passing, he continued to plead for the Guru's punishment with the newly enthroned emperor, Jahangir. He teamed up with Prithi Chand, the excommunicated son of Guru Ram Das who was not pleased at being passed over for the guruship, in his mission against the Guru. Eventually, his instigations finally proved successful and the Guru was arrested and brought to Lahore, where he was tortured to death. According to one local Lahori version of the events, Chandu Shah paid the emperor to obtain custody of the Guru to personally torture him at his house.

=== Death ===
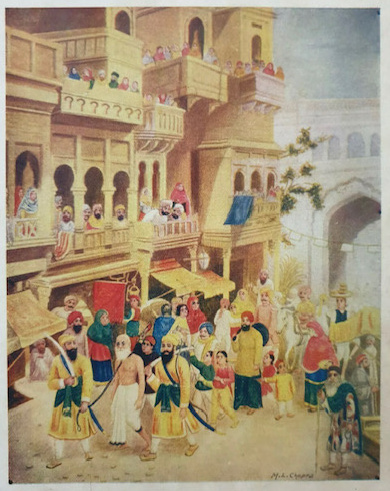
Chandu Shah being paraded through the markets of Lahore, by the Half Tone Press, Ranjit Nagara, Lahore, Punjab, ca.1930's

Sikh tradition states that Chandu Shah was eventually handed over to the Sikhs by Jahangir after the latter having been told about his scheming and misleading conspiracies by Guru Hargobind and was executed. He died after being led by procession through the streets of Lahore, suffering from shoe beatings from angry observers, and suffered a fatal strike from an iron ladle. Ironically, the torturer who had tortured Guru Arjan was also the one who tortured Chandu Shah. It has been argued by Pashaura Singh that Jahangir shifted blame for the execution of the Guru solely on Chandu Shah as a means to escape responsibility himself.

Chandu Shah had been survived by his son, Karam Chand, who in 1621 had been responsible for instigating the Mughal Emperor Shah Jahan against Guru Hargobind, leading to the Early Mughal-Sikh Wars and the Battle of Rohilla, much as his father before him had instigated Emperor Jahangir against Guru Arjan.

== Analysis ==
There are no contemporary Sikh scriptural texts that expound on Guru Arjan's execution. The first Sikh reference to the execution is found within the Mahima Prakash Vartak in 1741; it along with other narratives from the eighteenth and nineteenth century make mention of Chandu Shah and his alleged role in Arjan Dev's torture and execution. Non Sikh contemporaneous sources, which are limited and contradictory, held that the Guru was executed for his support for Prince Khusrau. A letter written four months after the execution by Father Jerome Xavier, head of a Jesuit order, stated that the Guru was fined 2 lakh rupees for placing a tilak on Khusrau's forehead- as a result of the Guru's inability to pay the fine, he was subsequently imprisoned. According to Xavier, a rich gentile then convinced the Emperor to free the Guru as his guarantor, however as Arjan and his followers were unable to pay him back, the man tortured him to death. Pashaura Singh identifies this man with Chandu Shah and further states that the meta-narrative surrounding Chandu Shah was a ploy by the Mughal Empire to absolve Jehangir and its administrators and shift the blame to the Guru's enemy. Positive portrayals of Jehangir in Sikh chronicles in the 18th and 19th century, he believes, are a testament to the effectiveness of the Mughal concocted narrative.

== Legacy ==
Chandu Shah's haveli in Lahore, known as 'Chandu de Haveli', located inside Mochi Gate, was demolished by Sikhs in 1799, the year Maharaja Ranjit Singh conquered the city, but it was rebuilt in 1825.
