= Mata Ganga =

Wife of the fifth Sikh guru

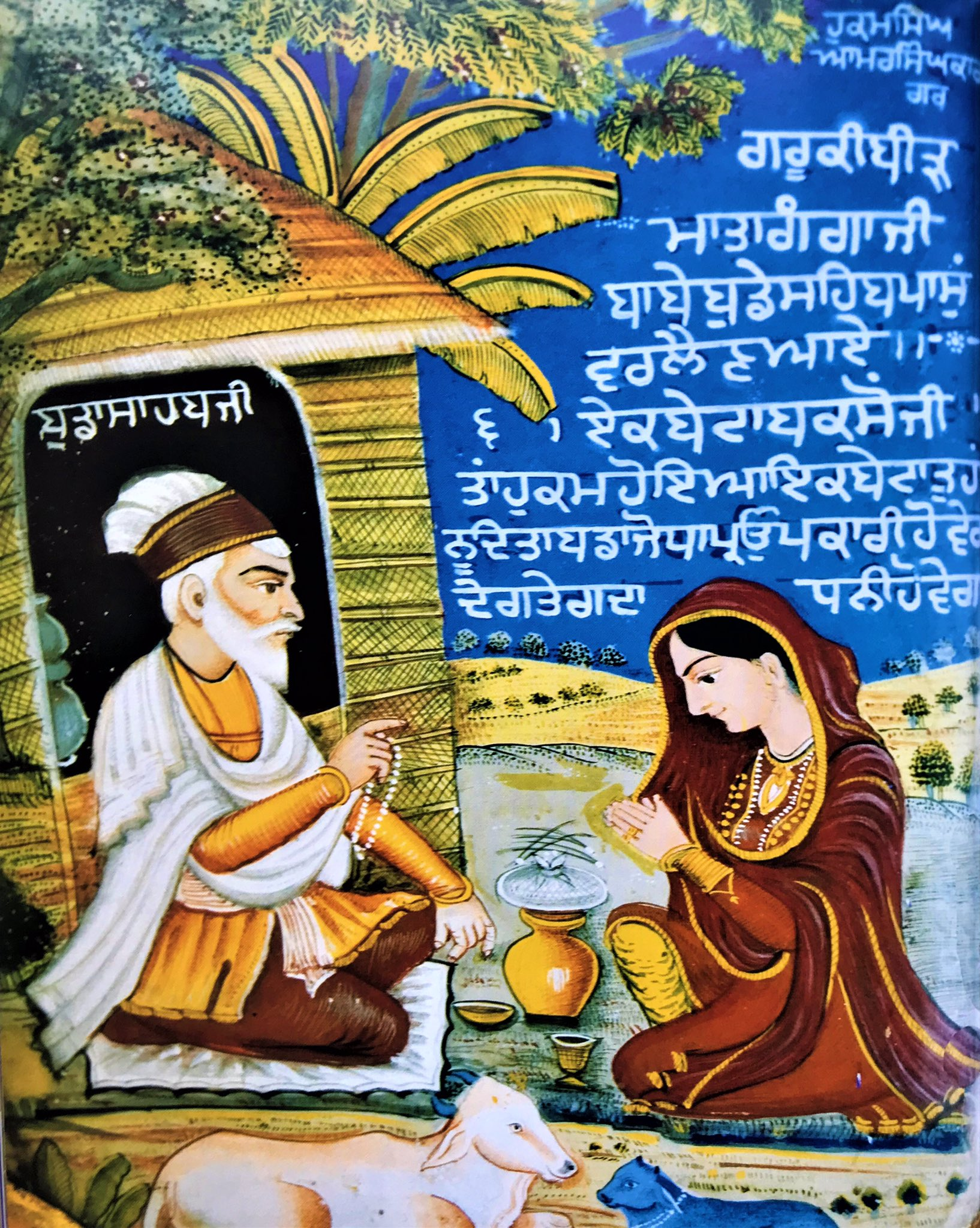
- Mural depicting Mata Ganga, wife of Guru Arjan, seeking blessings from Baba Buddha at a Birh (literally a reserved forest used for cattle grazing) from Takht Hazur Sahib, Nanded, circa 19th century

Personal life
- Born: Mau, Lahore Subah, Mughal Empire (present-day Jalandhar district, Punjab, India)
- Died: 14 May 1621 Bakala, Mughal Empire (present-day Punjab, India)
- Spouse: Guru Arjan
- Children: Guru Hargobind

Religious life
- Religion: Sikhism

Mata Ganga (died 14 May 1621) was the wife of the fifth Sikh guru, Guru Arjan. She is one of the four consorts bestowed with the title of Guru-Mahal.

== Early life ==
Ganga was born to a father named Krishan Chand who was a local of the village of Mau, Punjab which is located around ten kilometres west from Phillaur.

== Marriage ==
Her wedding to Arjan occurred on 19 June 1589 at her native village. She was the second wife of Arjan, as he had previously married Mata Ram Dei in 1579, around ten years prior.

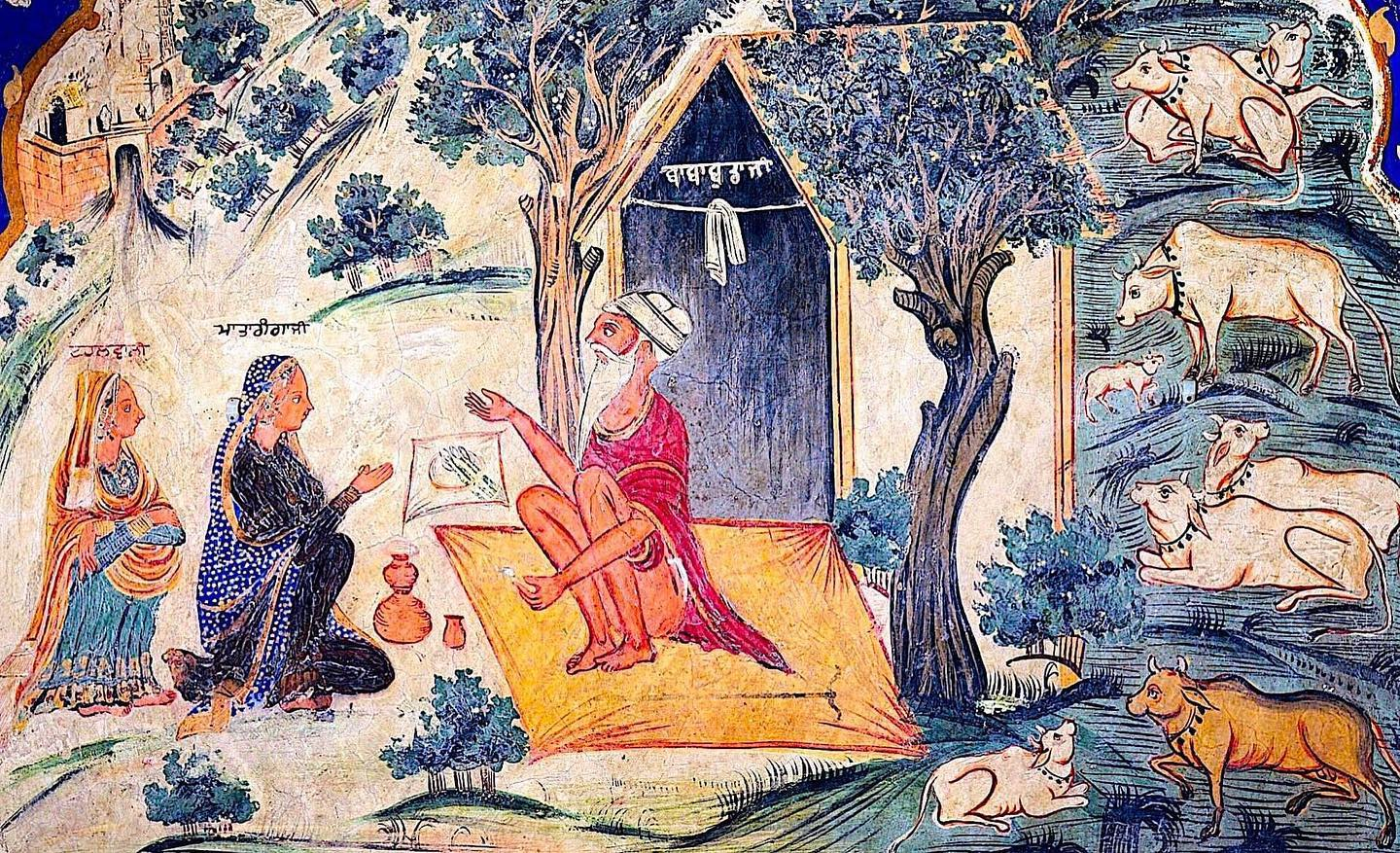
Fresco depicting the story of Mata Ganga seeking the blessing of Baba Buddha in-order to have a child, from Pothi-Mala, Guru Harsahai, ca.1745

According to a Sakhi from Sikh lore, Mata Ganga met with Baba Buddha to seek his blessings as the couple wished to have a child. The pair had been childless for a while despite their efforts. Karmo, who was Prithi Chand's jealous wife, mocked the couple for being issueless and claimed that the seat of guruship will eventually pass onto her own son Meharban since Arjan and Ganga were unable to produce their own biological successor. These remarks bothered Mata Ganga and so she pressed her husband about having a son of their own. However, Arjan out of humbleness asked his wife to ask Baba Buddha to fulfill her desire for a son.

Since Baba Buddha was an aged and reclusive personality, Mata Ganga would seek him out while barefoot for his blessings. The first attempt that Ganga made to seek the blessing of Baba Buddha ended in failure as she was accompanied by noisy carts and an entourage of girls, which came across as ostentatious and an unbefitting entrance of the family of the Sikh guru in the perspective of Baba Buddha. Baba Buddha also refused to accept gifts Ganga brought with her. Baba Buddha claimed that only the Sikh guru could bless someone, not him and thus Ganga returned home without the blessing she had sought.

After recounting the event to her husband Arjan, the Guru instructed Ganga on the correct manner at approaching a saintly individual with a request for a blessing. For the second attempt at seeking a blessing from Baba Buddha, Ganga prepared her own food by grinding her own corn to make simple dishes, enshrined God's name in her inner-self, carried the food on-top of her head to Baba Buddha, and was alone without any company during her visit to Baba Buddha. Baba Buddha was greatly pleased this time and whilst separating the pods of an onion from the food prepared personally by Ganga he blessed her to give birth to a tall, brave, good-looking, and strong son. The couple would give birth to a son named Hargobind at Vadali (located close by to Amritsar) on 19 June 1595. The news of the birth of Hargobind was difficult news to bear for Karmo and Prithi Chand, who were hoping the couple would remain without issue so they could assert their own son as the rightful heir to the Sikh guruship. Mata Ganga was the first person to see the face of a newborn son Ani Rai of Guru Hargobind and Mata Nanaki in 1619.

== Death ==
She died on 14 May 1621 at Bakala (which was later renamed 'Baba Bakala'). Her remains were placed in the Beas River as she wished rather than being cremated. The reason she wished for her remains to be placed in running water was that her husband, Arjan, had disappeared in a river during his incarceration by the Mughal Empire. An emblematic cremation took place at a samadh located in Bakala.

== Legacy ==
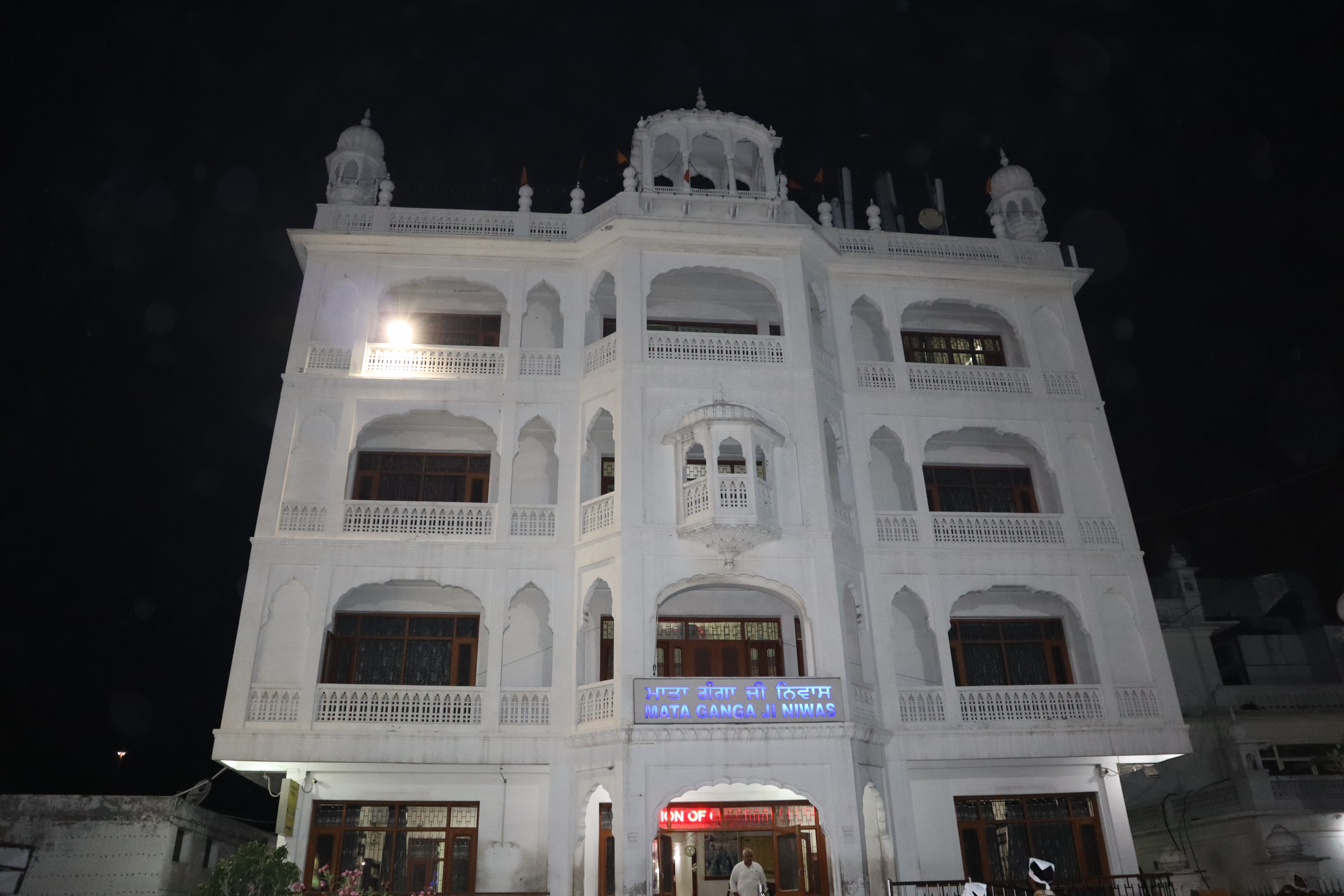
Photograph of the Mata Ganga Ji Niwas of the Golden Temple complex, Amritsar, Punjab, India, April 2023

The samadh where her symbolic cremation took place at Bakala was replaced by Gurdwara Mata Ganga to commemorate her life. There is a niwas structure dedicated in her name within the Golden Temple complex in Amritsar, Punjab, India.
