= Baba Buddha =

Important figure in Sikhism

Baba Buddha Ji
- ਬਾਬਾ ਬੁੱਢਾ
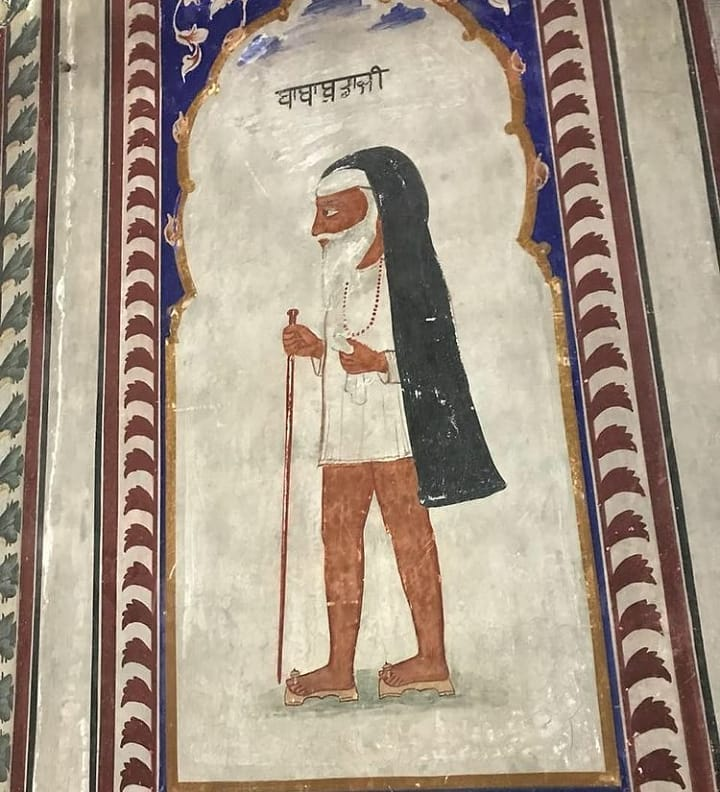
- Fresco depicting Baba Buddha with an identifying Gurmukhi inscription, Gurdwara Baba Bir Singh, circa 19th century

Personal life
- Born: Bura Randhawa; 6 October 1506 Kathu Nangal, Amritsar, India
- Died: 8 September 1631 (aged 124) Jhanda Ramdas
- Children: Bhai Bhana (1536-1644)
- Parent(s): Bhai Sukha Randhawa (father); Mai Gauran Sandhu (mother)
- Known for: Early figure of Sikhism

Religious life
- Religion: Sikhism

Baba Buddha (Gurmukhi: ਬਾਬਾ ਬੁੱਢਾ; bābā buḍhā; lit. meaning "wise old man"; 6 October 1506 – 8 September 1631 or 1571–1631) was a prime figure in early Sikhism. He is likely the origin of the bhai tradition of Sikhism and is also known as Bhai Buddha. As a contemporary of seven Sikh gurus, he personally installed four of them to the guruship.

== Early life ==
He was born to a Randhawa Jat Hindu family in 1506 in the village of Kathu Nangal in Amritsar. His father's name was Sukha Randhawa and his mother was named Mai Gauran. His birth name was Bura (Gurmukhi: ਬੂੜਾ; būṛā).

As a child, while grazing cattle outside his village, he met Guru Nanak. He asked Guru Nanak many questions regarding life and death, such that, at his young age, Guru Nanak blessed him with the name Buddha, as he spoke as if he were a wise elder. He had been a follower of Guru Nanak since the Kartarpur chapter.

== Spiritual career ==
He was one of the earliest Sikhs of Guru Nanak, and performed the formal coronation ceremonies of the five Sikh gurus who succeeded Guru Nanak; Guru Angad, Guru Amar Das, Guru Ram Das, Guru Arjan, and Guru Hargobind.

Buddha was consulted during the compilation of the Sikh scripture. On installation of the Adi Granth, a compilation of Sikh scripture, at Sri Harimandir Sahib on August 16, 1604, Bhai Buddha was appointed the first Granthi by Guru Arjan.

When Bhani (daughter of Guru Amar Das) had a jagir land grant (consisting of 500 biggas) of productive agricultural land bestowed upon her by the Mughal emperor Akbar, Baba Buddha was administrator of the land. The land became known as 'Beer Baba Buddha Ji' as a result. The land had a gurdwara constructed upon it, was used for farming, and educational activities.

Ganga, wife of Guru Arjan, sought out Baba Buddha for his blessings when Ganga desired to give birth to a son in-order to have an heir to the guruship. After a failed first attempt, Baba Buddha eventually granted her wish and blessed her. Guru Hargobind was born to Ganga after this blessing.

== Military career ==
According to Sikh hagiographies and oral histories, Baba Buddha learnt the Sikh martial art system of Shastar Vidya from Guru Nanak himself. Baba Buddha provided the successive gurus of Nanak training in the martial art and was ordained by Guru Hargobind to instruct recruits into the first Sikh army, in Shastar Vidya.

On May 30, 1606, after the martyrdom of Guru Arjan, Guru Hargobind ordered the construction of the Akal Takht and entrusted the responsibility of its construction to Baba Buddha and Bhai Gurdas. While Guru Hargobind was in jail, Baba Budha reformed the Nihang army, at the time called the Akal Sena, although now it is named the Budha Dal after Jathedar Baba Budha Randhawa.

== Death ==
After a lifetime of following the Sikh Gurus, Baba Buddha died at the age of 124 in 1631 at the village of Jhanda Ramdas, on the banks of the Ravi River. Guru Hargobind was at his bedside and honoured him by carrying him to his funeral pyre and reciting passages from the Adi Granth.

== Descendants ==
His great-great-grandson Gurditta (1625–1675) was also arrested in Delhi when Guru Tegh Bahadur was. Sahib Ram Kaur was the 7th linear descendant of Baba Buddha. In 1850, a school operated out of her shrine in Kotnaina in Gurdaspur district with sadh, granthi, brahmin, and musician teachers.

== Gallery ==
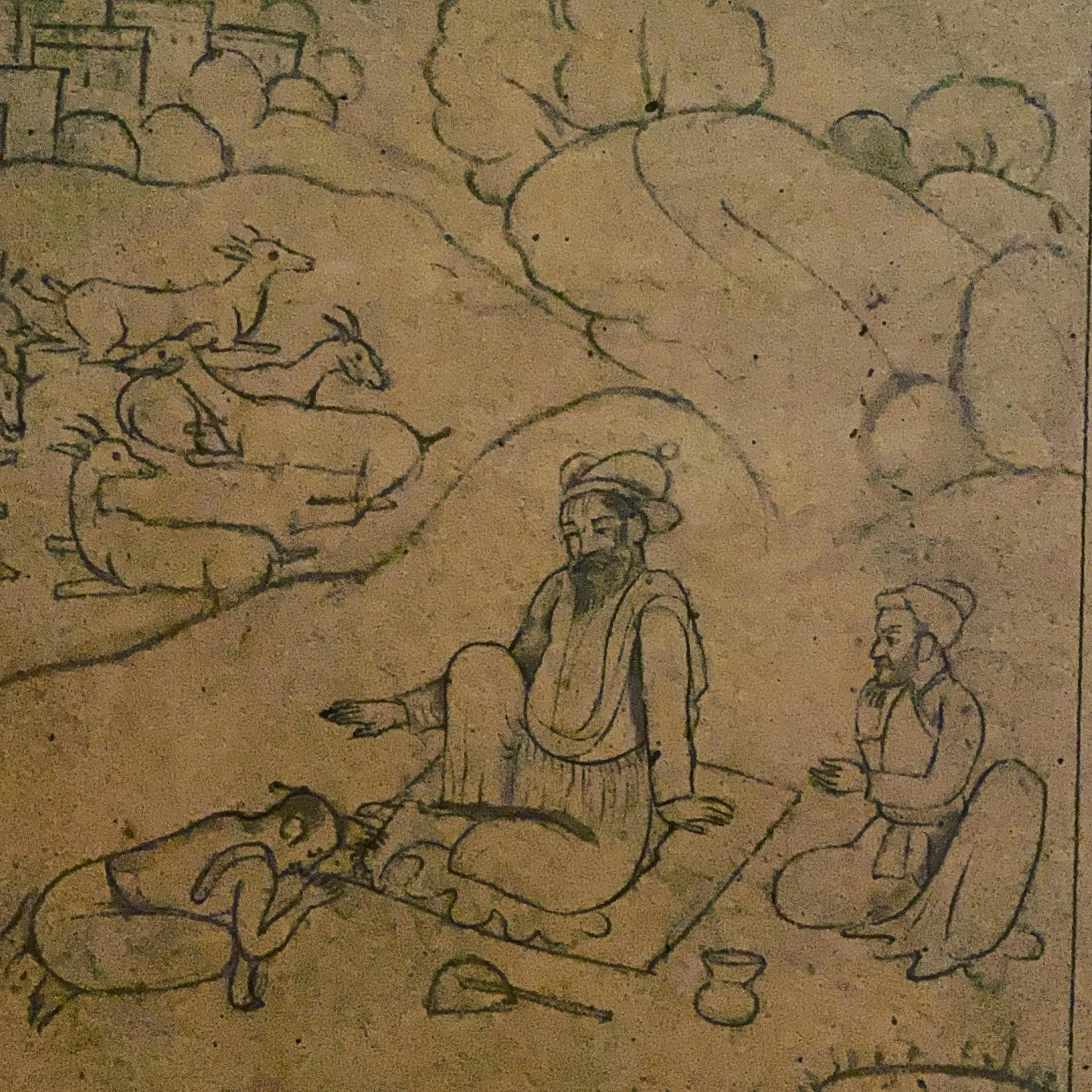
Baba Buddha, as a young boy, seeks the blessings of Guru Nanak. Pahari, brush drawing, from the family workshop of Nainsukh of Guler, last quarter of the 18th century.

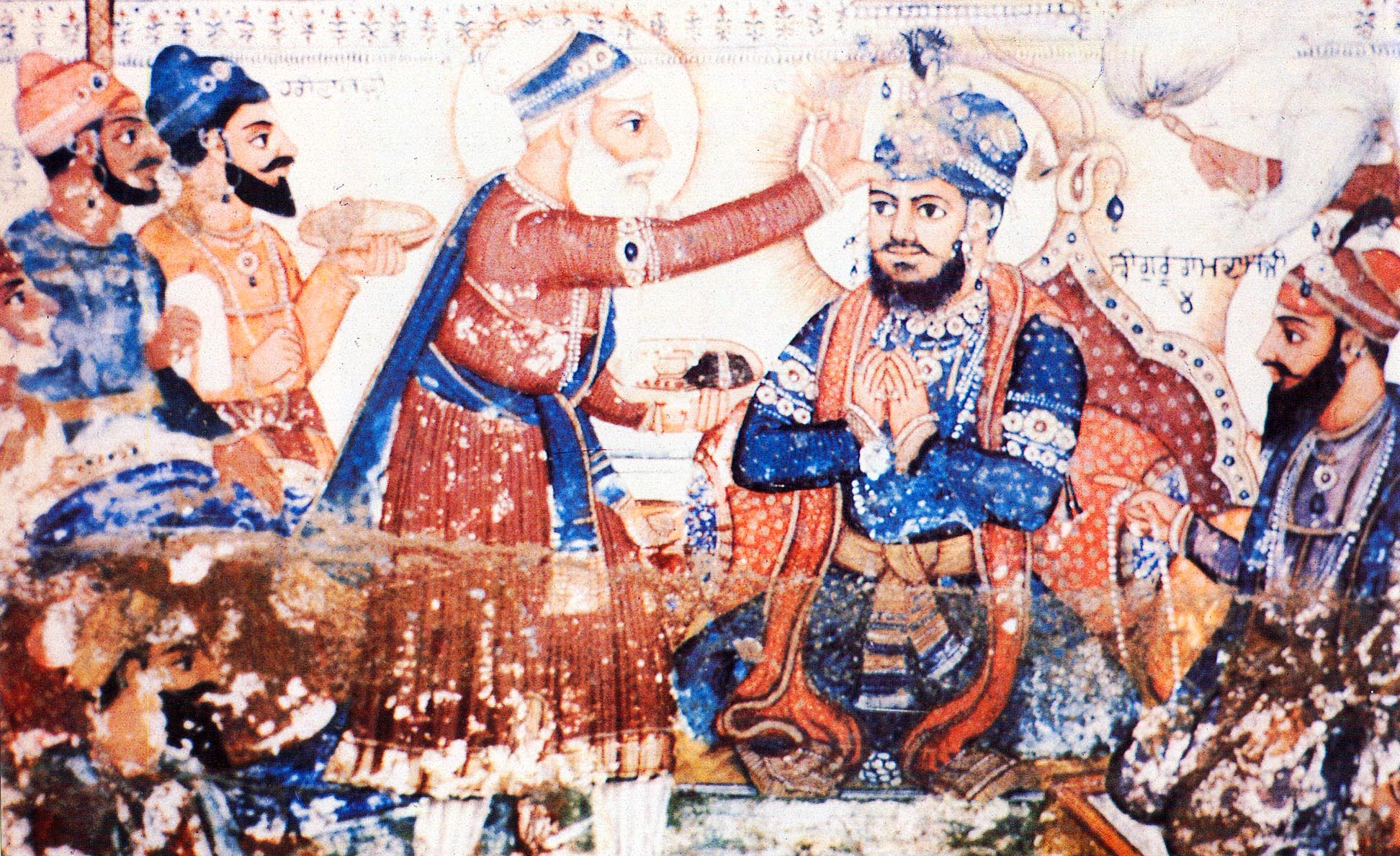
Baba Buddha crowning the fifth guru

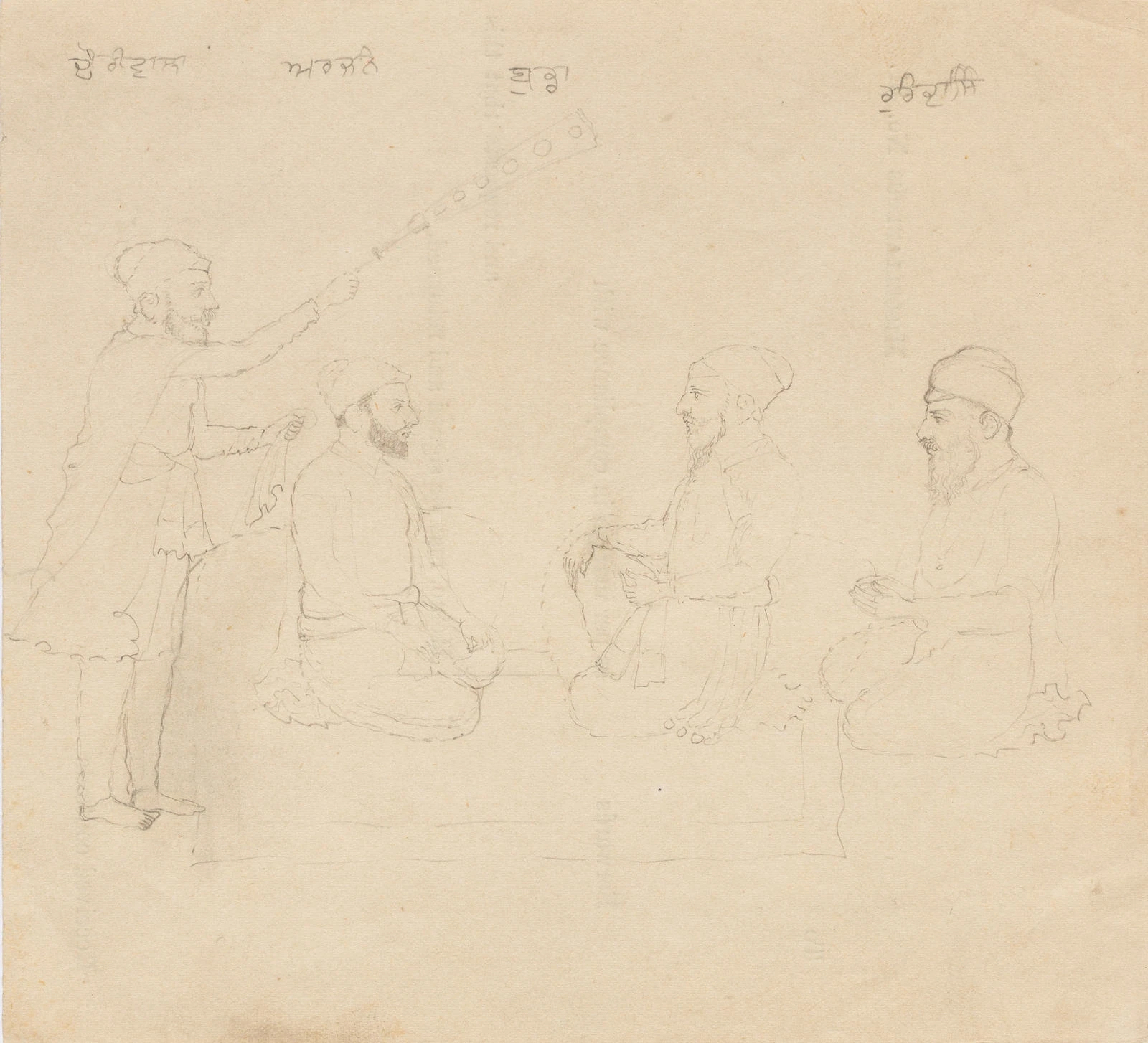
19th century drawing of Guru Arjan meeting Baba Buddha and Bhai Gurdas

== See also ==
- Bhai Gurdas
- Bhai Mani Singh
- Baba Deep Singh
- Gurgaddi
