= Mau, Punjab =

Mau
- Village
- Location in Punjab, India Mau (India)
- Coordinates: 31.0122162°N 75.6910798°E
- Country: India
- State: Punjab
- District: Jalandhar

Government
  - Type: Panchayat raj
  - Body: Gram panchayat
- Elevation: 240 m (790 ft)

Population (2011)
  - Total: 3,096
- Sex ratio 1582/1514 ♂/♀

Languages
  - Official: Punjabi
- Time zone: UTC+5:30 (IST)
- PIN: 144035
- ISO 3166 code: IN-PB
- Vehicle registration: PB- 08
- Website: jalandhar.nic.in

Mau is a village in Jalandhar district of Punjab State, India. It is located 10 km from Phillaur, 53 km from district headquarter Jalandhar and 120 km from state capital Chandigarh. The village is administrated by a sarpanch who is an elected representative of village as per Panchayati raj (India).

== Demography ==
According to the report published by Census India in 2011, Mau has a total number of 620 houses and population of 3096 of which include 1582 males and 1514 females. Literacy rate of Mau is 75.63%, lower than state average of 75.84%. The population of children under the age of 6 years is 343 which is 11.08% of total population of Mau, and child sex ratio is approximately 927 higher than state average of 846.

Most of the people are from Schedule Caste which constitutes 53.55% of total population in Mau. The town does not have any Schedule Tribe population so far.

As per census 2011, 1069 people were engaged in work activities out of the total population of Mau which includes 876 males and 193 females. According to census survey report 2011, 80.64% workers describe their work as main work and 19.36% workers are involved in marginal activity providing livelihood for less than 6 months.

== Notable people ==
- Raja Nipal Chand

== Transport ==
Partabpura railway station is the nearest train station; however, Phillaur Junction train station is 9.3 km away from the village. The village is 38 km away from domestic airport in Ludhiana and the nearest international airport is located in Chandigarh also Sri Guru Ram Dass Jee International Airport is the second nearest airport which is 147 km away in Amritsar.
