= Sikh gurus =

Spiritual leaders of Sikhism

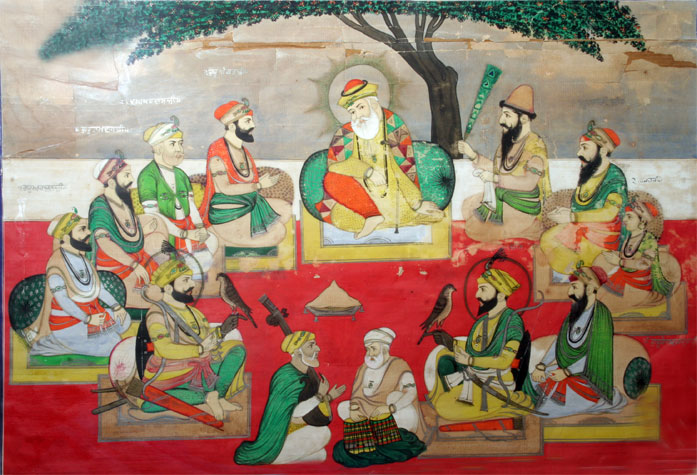
A miniature painting, dated 1890, depicting an "imaginary portrait" of the ten gurus and others.

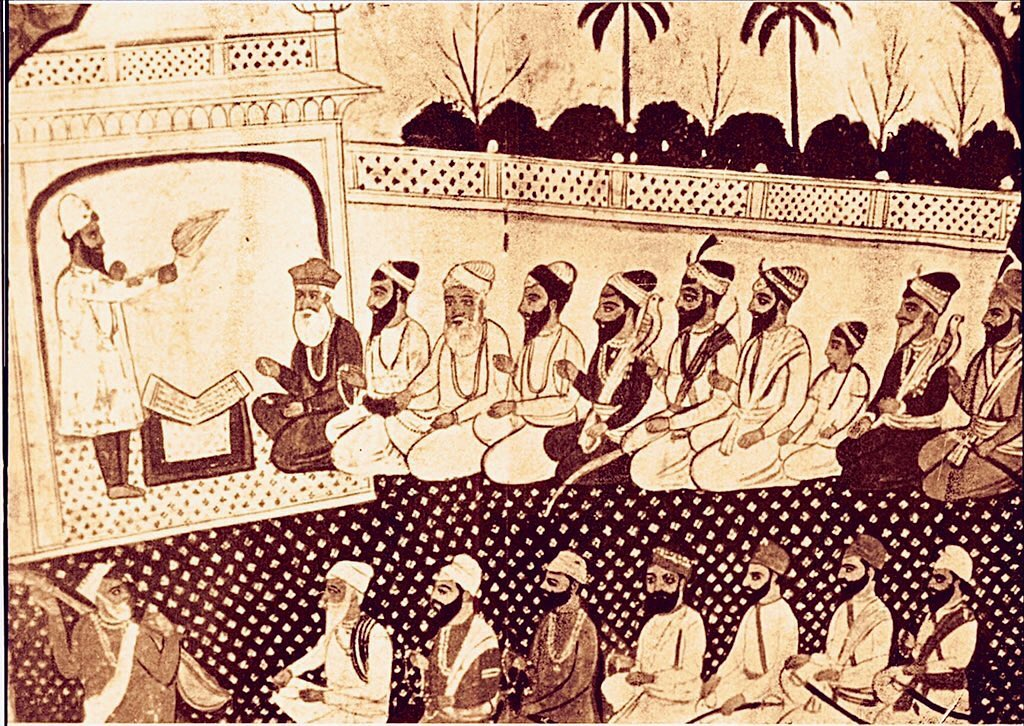
Gurus of the Sikhs. Fresco from Dera Nirmala, Tanda-Hoshiarpur.

The Sikh gurus (Punjabi: ਸਿੱਖ ਗੁਰੂ; Hindi: सिख गुरु) are the spiritual masters or sources of learning of Sikhism, who established the religion over the course of about two and a half centuries, beginning in 1469. The year 1469 marks the birth of Guru Nanak, the founder of Sikhism. Nine other human gurus succeeded him. Then, in 1708, the tenth guru passed the guruship on to the holy Sikh scripture, Guru Granth Sahib, which is now considered the living guru by the followers of the Sikh faith. The guruship was also passed on to the Guru Panth, consisting of the Khalsa; however, this form of guruship went into decline following the rise of Ranjit Singh.

== Etymology and definition ==
Guru (/ˈɡuruː/, UK also /ˈɡʊruː, ˈɡʊər-/; Sanskrit: गुरु, Punjabi: ਗੁਰੂ, IAST: guru) is a Sanskrit term for a "teacher, guide, expert, or master" of a certain field or area of knowledge. Bhai Vir Singh, in his dictionary of Guru Granth Sahib describes the term guru as a combination of two separate units: "Gu;(ਗੁ)" meaning darkness and "Rū;(ਰੂ)" which means light. Hence, guru is that which brings light into darkness — or, in other words, the one who enlightens. Bhai Vir Singh's definition provides further insight about Sikhism itself and explains why Guru Granth Sahib is considered the living Guru. The word Sikh is derived from the Sanskrit term shishya (Punjabi: ਸਿੱਖ) which means a disciple or a student. Thus, Sikhs have a student–teacher relationship with their gurus since their teachings, as written in Guru Granth Sahib, serve as a guide for Sikhs.

According to Sikh beliefs, all the Gurus contained the same light or soul and their physical body was a vessel for containing the same essence. When one guru passed, the successor inherited this light and that is why the gurus are also referred to as mahalla (house). They were formally referred to as patiśāh, being viewed by Sikhs as the masters of both spiritual (dīn/pīrī) and temporal (dunīyā/mīrī) affairs.

== History ==
Guru Nanak, the first guru, was succeeded as guru by Guru Angad. By 1600, there were many contesting claimaints for the Sikh guruship, leading to internal strife and divisions. It was during the period of Guru Gobind Singh that reforms were introduced, such as the formal introduction of the Khalsa Panth and a steady ceasing of a personal, human guruship, preparing for a future without one. The last guru declared that after him the guruship would pass both onto the Khālsā Panth and Granth Sahib. The Khalsa was supposed to act in accordance with the scripture, which was the guiding wisdom of revelation, while the Panth was invested with authority (jāmā) that had formerly been conferred upon a personal leader (human gurus) but now was the responsibility of the collective community, with personal leadership being rejected. The goal set forth was sovereignty (patiśāhī).

== The gurus ==
No.	Name	Portrait	Birth date	Guruship	Birthplace	Clan	Father	Mother	Date of death	Reason	Place of death
1	Guru Nanak		14 April 1469 (Note: Officially observed on Katak Puranmashi (October–November))	Since birth	Nankana Sahib, Punjab, Delhi Sultanate	Bedi Khatri	Kalyan Das Bedi	Mata Tripta	22 September 1539 (aged 70)	Natural causes	Kartarpur, Punjab, Mughal Empire
2	Guru Angad		31 March 1504	7 September 1539	Muktsar, Punjab, Mughal Empire	Trehan Khatri	Baba Pheru Mal	Mata Ramo	29 March 1552 (aged 47)	Natural causes	Khadur Sahib, Punjab, Mughal Empire
3	Guru Amar Das		5 May 1479	26 April 1552	Amritsar, Punjab, Mughal Empire	Bhalla Khatri	Tej Bhan Bhalla	Mata Lachmi	1 September 1574 (aged 95)	Natural causes	Goindval, Lahore Subah, Mughal Empire
4	Guru Ram Das		24 September 1534	1 September 1574	Lahore, Punjab, Mughal Empire	Sodhi Khatri	Baba Har Das	Mata Daya	1 September 1581 (aged 46)	Natural causes	Goindval, Lahore Subah, Mughal Empire
5	Guru Arjan		15 April 1563	1 September 1581	Goindval, Punjab, Mughal Empire	Sodhi Khatri	Guru Ram Das	Mata Bhani	30 May 1606 (aged 43)	Execution by Mughal Emperor Jahangir	Lahore, Lahore Subah, Mughal Empire
6	Guru Hargobind		19 June 1595	25 May 1606	Amritsar, Lahore Subah, Mughal Empire	Sodhi Khatri	Guru Arjan	Mata Ganga	28 February 1644 (aged 48)	Natural causes	Kiratpur Sahib, Lahore Subah, Mughal Empire
7	Guru Har Rai		16 January 1630	3 March 1644	Kiratpur Sahib, Lahore Subah, Mughal Empire	Sodhi Khatri	Baba Gurditta	Mata Nihal Kaur	6 October 1661 (aged 31)	Natural causes	Delhi, Delhi Subah, Mughal Empire
8	Guru Har Krishan		7 July 1656	7 October 1661	Kiratpur Sahib, Lahore Subah, Mughal Empire	Sodhi Khatri	Guru Har Rai	Mata Krishan Kaur	30 March 1664 (aged 7)	Smallpox	Delhi, Delhi Subah, Mughal Empire
9	Guru Tegh Bahadur		1 April 1621	20 March 1664	Amritsar, Lahore Subah, Mughal Empire	Sodhi Khatri	Guru Hargobind	Mata Nanaki	11 November 1675 (aged 54)	Execution by Mughal Emperor Aurangzeb	Delhi, Delhi Subah, Mughal Empire
10	Guru Gobind Singh		22 December 1666	11 November 1675	Patna Sahib, Bihar Subah, Mughal Empire	Sodhi Khatri	Guru Tegh Bahadur	Mata Gujri	7 October 1708 (aged 41)	Assassinated by Jamshed Khan and Wasil Beg on order of Wazir Khan	Hazur Sahib, Bidar Subah, Mughal Empire
11	Guru Panth		Vaisakhi, April 1699		Kesgarh Qila, Anandpur Sahib, Punjab	Casteless	Guru Gobind Singh (spirtually)	Mata Sahib Devan (spiritually)	Whilst prevalent in the 18th century, this manner of guruship went into decline following the rise of Ranjit Singh and is seldom evoked today, being overshadowed by the Guru Granth.		
11	Guru Granth Sahib		29 August 1604 (date of completion of compilation of the first draft [Adi Granth])	20 October 1708	Amritsar, Lahore Subah, Mughal Empire (place of compilation)	The central holy scripture of Sikhism, regarded as the final, sovereign and eternal Guru.					

=== Pedigrees ===
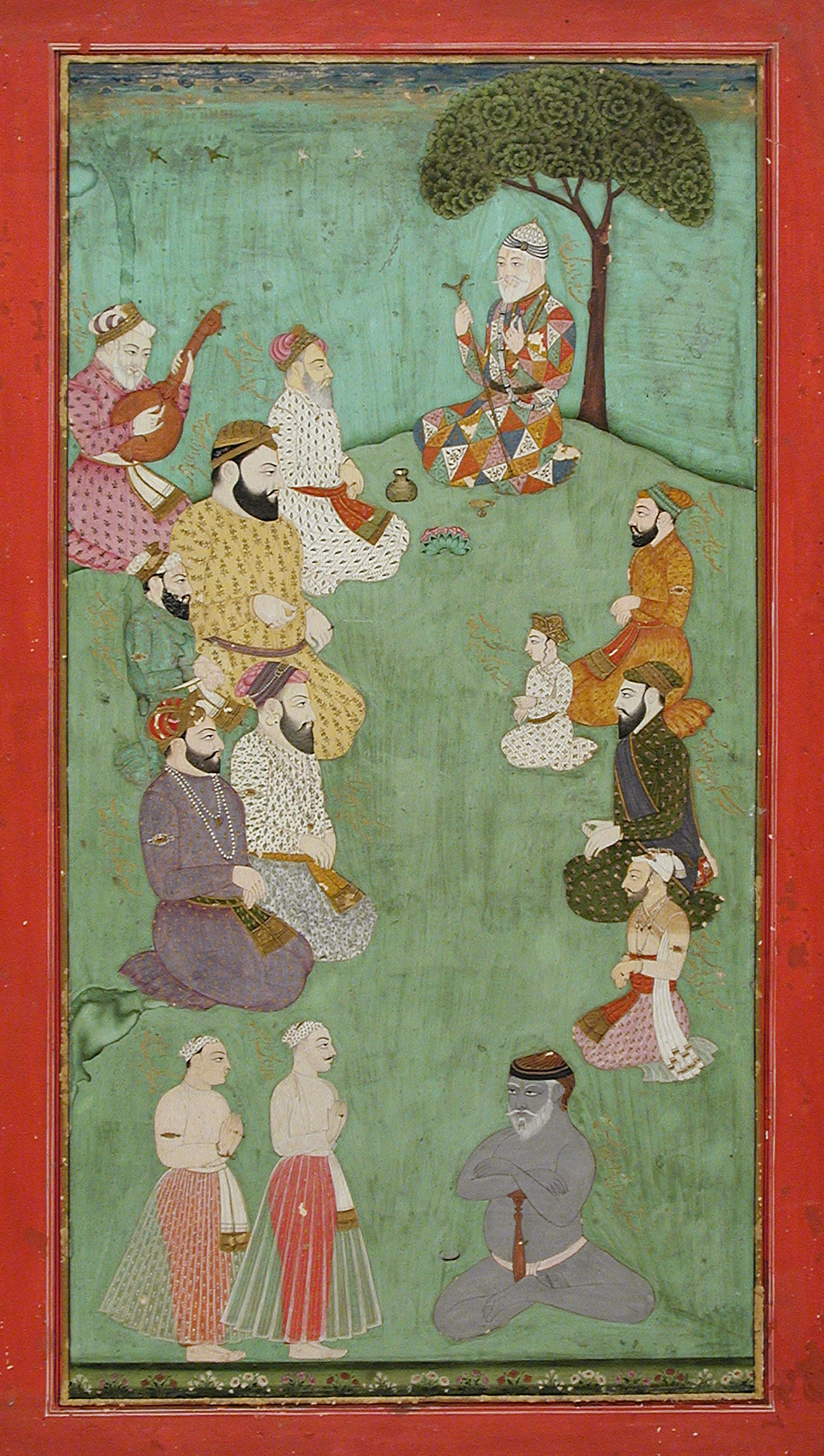
Imaginary Meeting of Guru Nanak and the rest of the Sikh Gurus, Bhai Mardana, and others. 1780 painting

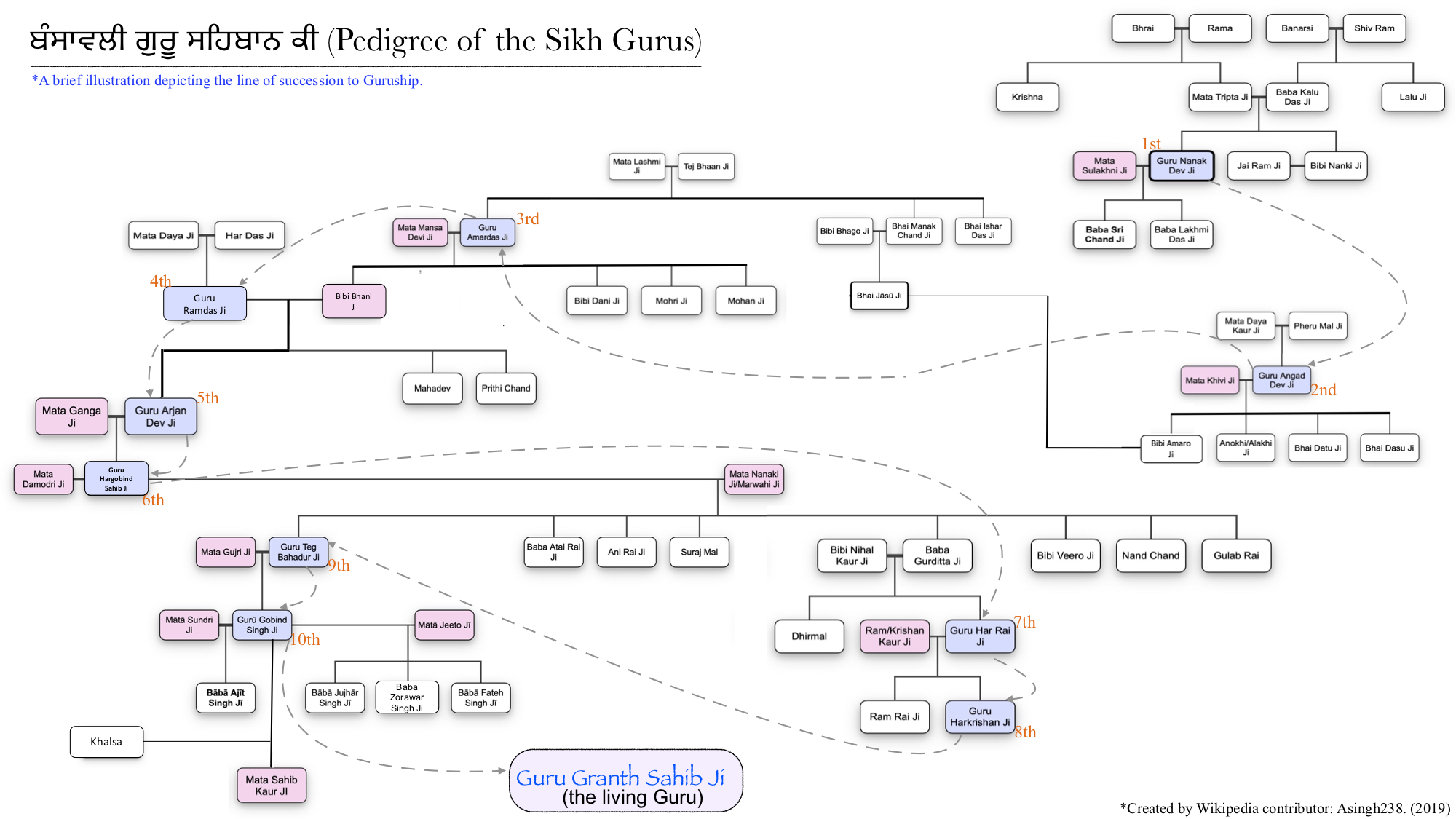
(Note: Listed names and relations might vary from source to source since different aspects of Sikh history have been written by many individuals over the course of past six centuries)

== Base of operations ==
Guru Nanak founded Kartarpur (Narowal) in the 1520s and remained there until his death in 1539. Nanak's successor, Guru Angad, made his native Khadur his headquarters and remained there throughout his guruship from 1539 to 1551. Guru Amar Das founded Goindwal and resided there from 1551 to 1574. Guru Ram Das established Ramdaspur (now called Amritsar) and remained there from 1574 to 1581. Guru Arjan also resided at Amritsar but also founded the settlements of Kartarpur (Jalandhar), Hargobindpur, and Tarn Taran. Guru Hargobind had Amritsar as his base from 1606–1628 but shifted to Kartarpur between 1628–1634. Guru Hargobind founded Kiratpur in 1634, where he remained until his death in 1644. Guru Har Rai resided at Kiratpur during his guruship, as did Guru Har Krishan. The next Sikh guru, Guru Tegh Bahadur, founded Anandpur in 1664 and remained there until 1675, yet also travelled to distant areas, such as Dhaka and Patna in eastern India. The tenth Sikh guru, Guru Gobind Singh, remained at Anandpur from 1675–1704. He founded the settlements of Paonta (1685) and Damdama (Bathinda) in 1705, where he remained for two years until he journeyed down south to Nanded, dying in 1708.

== See also ==
- History of Sikhism
- Khalsa
- Gurgadi
- Gurpurab
- Joti Jot
