= Guru Gaddi =

Sikh term meaning "seat of the guru"

Guru Gaddi (Punjabi: ਗੁਰੂ ਗੱਦੀ), alternatively spelt as Gurgadi, Gurgadhi, or Gurgaddi, means "seat of the guru".

== History ==
The Gurgadi being passed from one Sikh guru to the next was a ceremony that bestowed the guruship upon the new guru. It involved a coconut and five paise. Guru Gobind Singh ended the lineage of living (dehdhari) gurus and proclaimed the guruship of the Guru Granth Sahib in-perpetuity. He did this shortly before his death on 6 October 1708 at Nanded, presently in the state of Maharashtra in India. in the Deccan.

== Celebration ==
Guru-ta-Gaddi is an important Sikh religious event held every 3 November. The event honors when the tenth and last Sikh Guru said that 'the next Guru would be the Holy Sikh Book' Guru Granth Sahib. Guru Gobind Singh, declared that Guru Granth Sahib from that moment would be the only Guru or the Guiding Force. The message was delivered on 3 November 1708 by Guru Gobind Singh at Nanded. Guru Gobind Singh Ji established Khalsa and conferred the status of the Guru to the Guru Granth Sahib and elevated it as the everlasting Guru.

This event is commemorated with a festival/ritual that starts with Diwali in India. The tercentenary celebrations of the occasion are being referred at Guru-da-gaddi and are being celebrated on 3 November 2008 in Nanded in Maharashtra. The occasion comes after celebrations of 300 years of Khalsa panth established by Guru Gobind Singh in 1699.

== Gallery ==
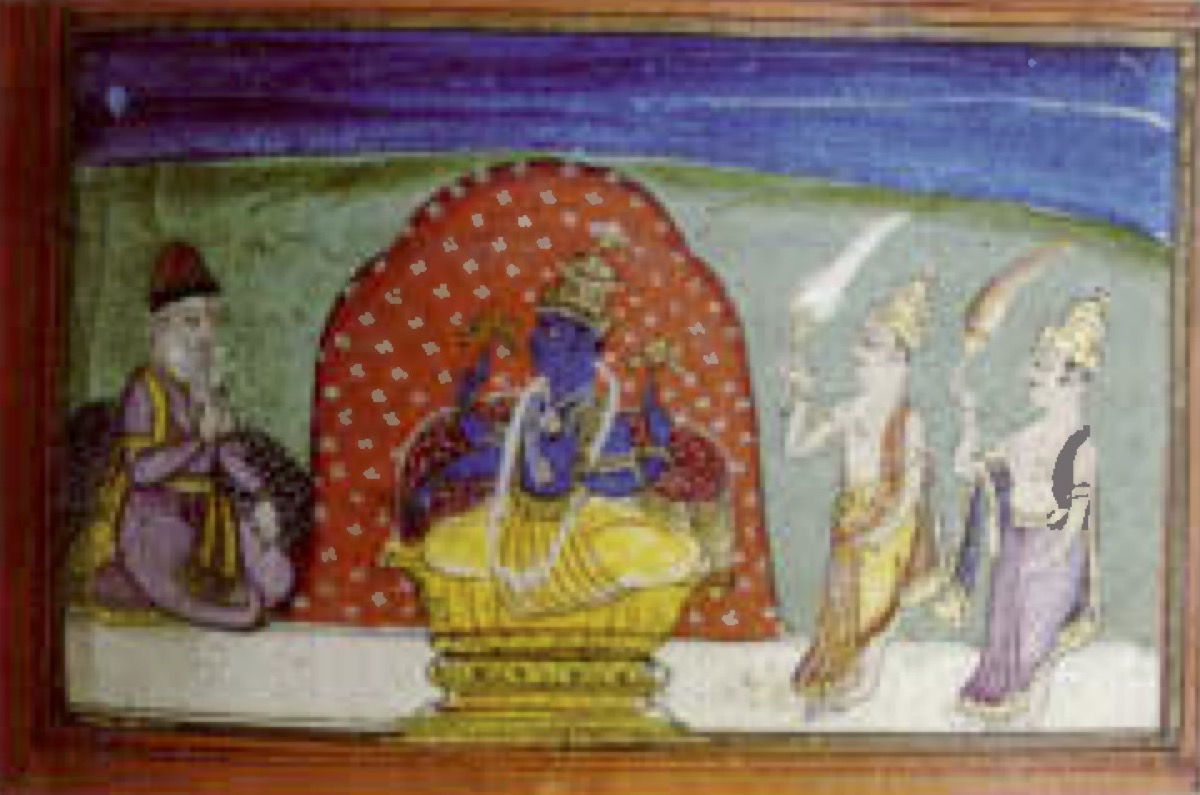
Baba Nanak in the court of God and receiving instructions on his divine mission and the Guruship, early 19th century Janamsakhi painting from Kashmir

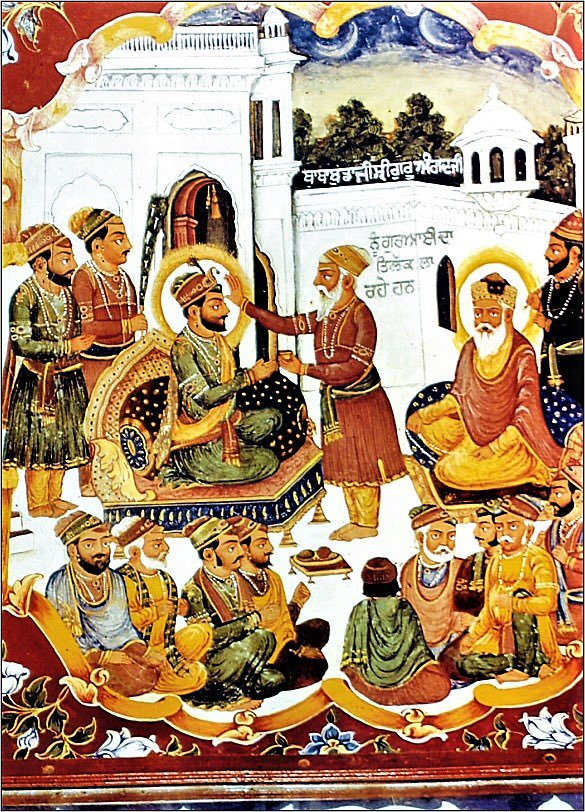
Gurgadi ceremony of Guru Angad

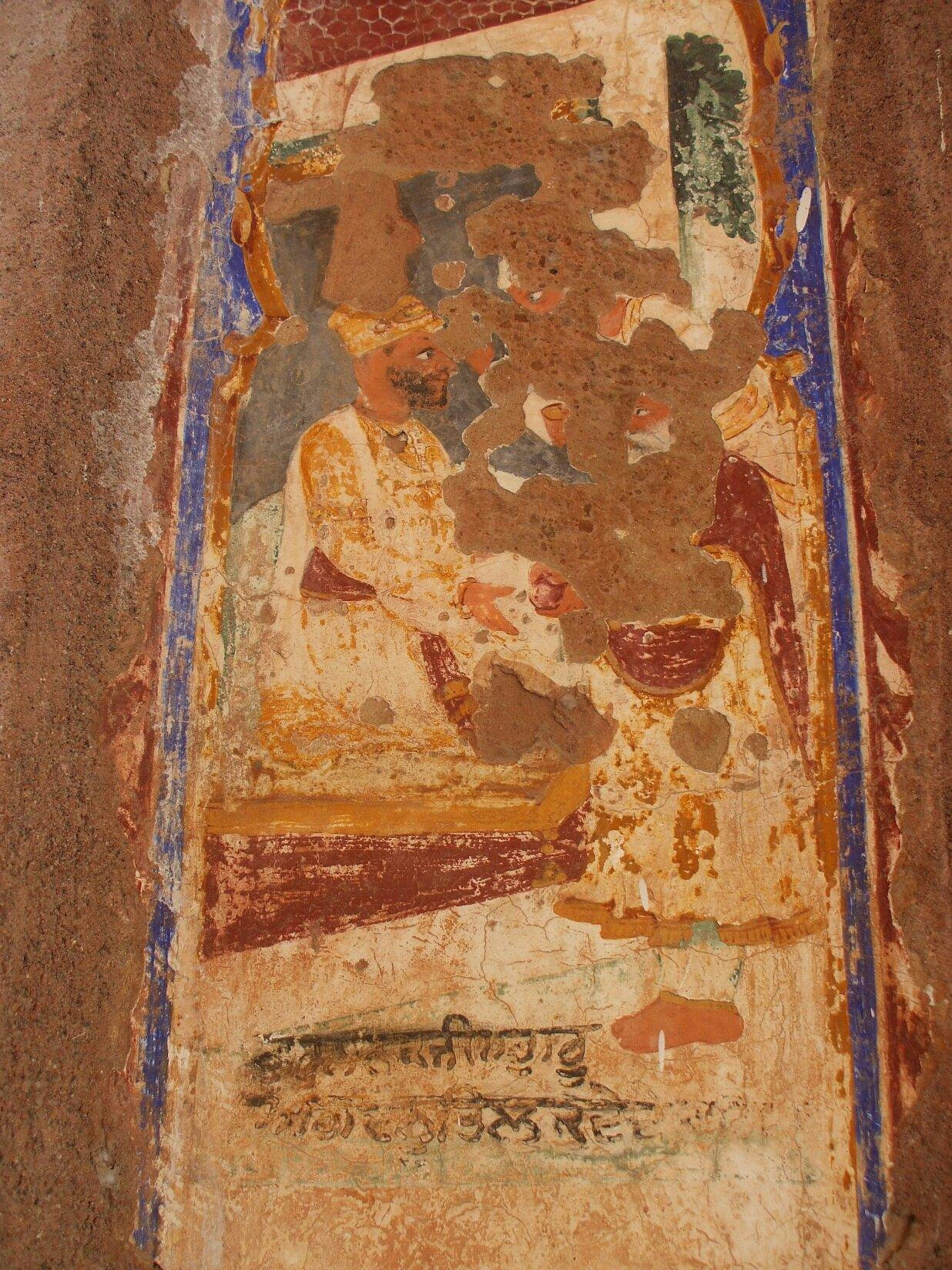
Another depiction of the Gurgadi ceremony of Guru Angad

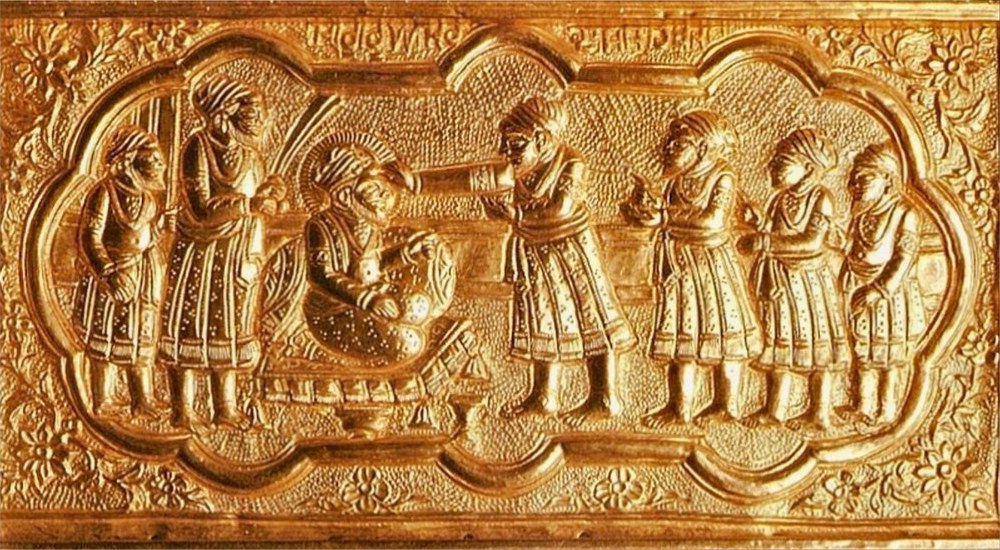
Gurgadi ceremony of Guru Amar Das

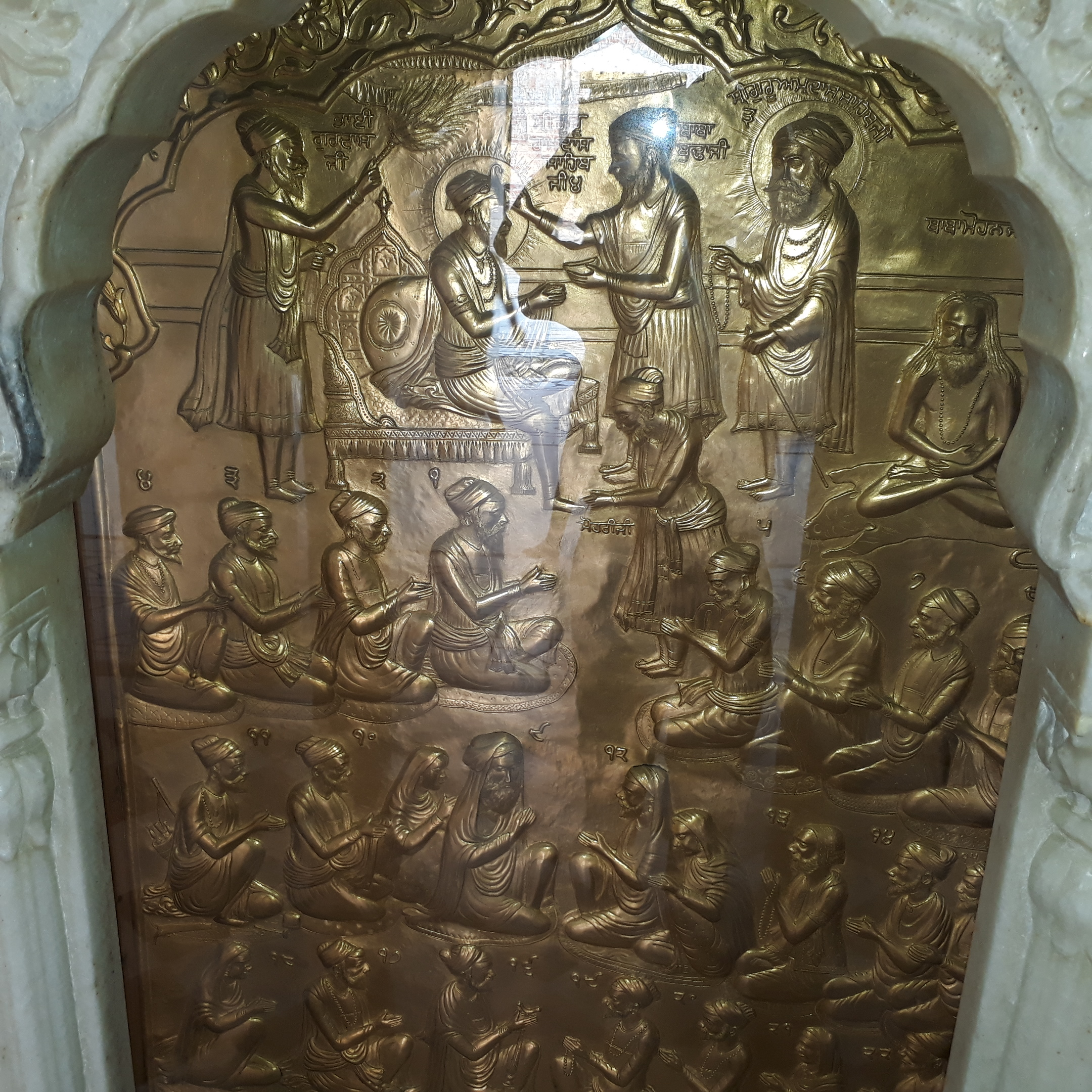
Gurgadi ceremony of Guru Ram Das

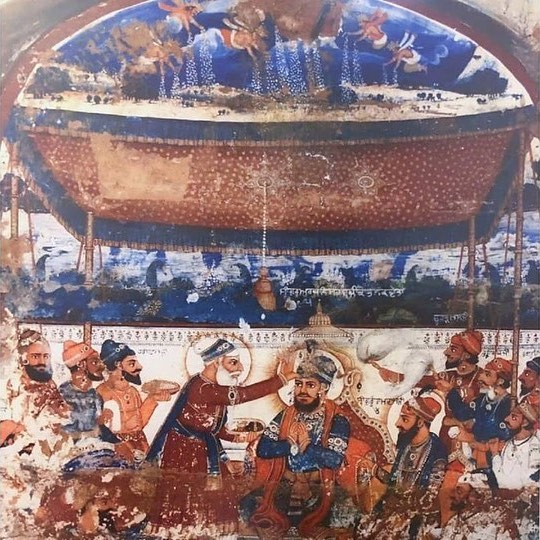
Gurgadi ceremony of Guru Arjan

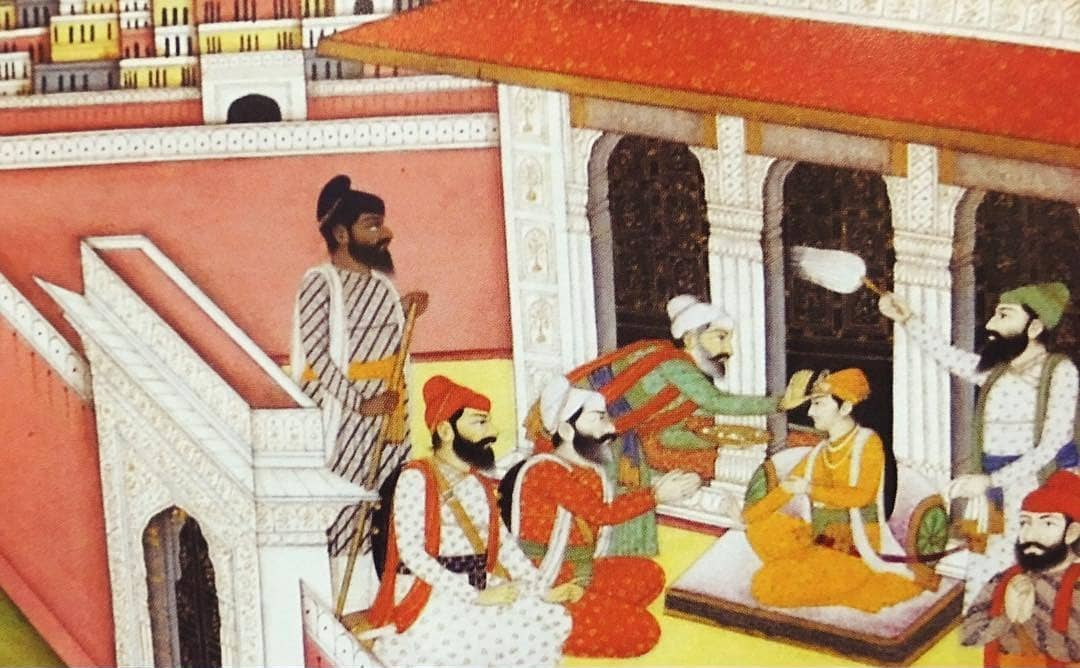
Gurgadi ceremony of Guru Gobind Singh

== See also ==
- Baba Buddha
- Gurpurb
- Joti Jot
- Guru Maneyo Granth
- Gaddi Nashin
