= Guru Arjan =

Fifth Sikh guru from 1581 to 1606

- ਗੁਰੂ ਅਰਜਨ
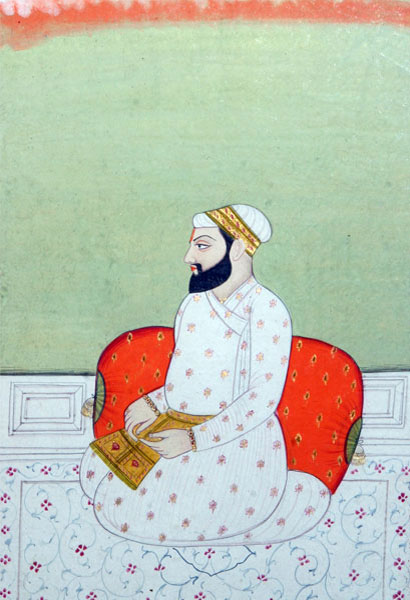
- Painting of Guru Arjan by the family atelier of Purkhu of Kangra, circa 1800
- Title: 5th Guru of Sikhism

Personal life
- Born: 15 April 1563 Goindwal, Lahore Subah, Mughal Empire (present-day Tarn Taran district, Punjab, India)
- Died: 30 May 1606 (aged 43) Lahore, Lahore Subah, Mughal Empire (present-day Punjab, Pakistan)
- Cause of death: Execution
- Resting place: Gurdwara Dera Sahib, Walled City of Lahore
- Spouse: Mata Ram Dei; Mata Ganga
- Children: Guru Hargobind
- Parent(s): Guru Ram Das and Mata Bhani
- Known for: Building the Harmandir Sahib; Founding Taran Taran Sahib city; Compiling the Adi Granth and installing them in Harmandir Sahib; Founding Kartarpur, Jalandhar city; Composing fifth hymn of Kirtan Sohila; Writing Sukhmani Sahib; Writing the Prichhia, a prose work
- Other names: Fifth Master; Fifth Nanak

Religious life
- Religion: Sikhism

Religious career
- Based in: Amritsar (1581–1606)
- Period in office: 1581–1606
- Predecessor: Guru Ram Das
- Successor: Guru Hargobind

Guru Arjan (Note: Some scholars spell Guru Arjan's name as 'Guru Arjun'.) (Gurmukhi: ਗੁਰੂ ਅਰਜਨ, pronunciation: [gʊɾuː əɾd͡ʒənᵊ]; 15 April 1563 – 30 May 1606) was the fifth of the ten Sikh Gurus. He compiled the first official edition of the Sikh scripture called the Adi Granth, which later expanded into the Guru Granth Sahib. He is regarded as the first of the two Gurus martyred in the Sikh faith. He is credited for founding the settlements of Kartarpur (Jalandhar district), Hargobindpur, and Tarn Taran.

Guru Arjan was born in Goindval, in the Punjab, the youngest son of Bhai Jetha, who later became Guru Ram Das, and Mata Bhani, the daughter of Guru Amar Das. He completed the construction of the Darbar Sahib at Amritsar, after the fourth Sikh Guru, his father, had founded the town and built a sarovar. Arjan compiled the hymns of previous Gurus and of other saints into the Adi Granth, the first edition of the Sikh scripture, and installed it in the Harimandir Sahib.

Guru Arjan reorganized the Masand system initiated by Guru Ram Das by suggesting that Sikhs donate, if possible, one-tenth of their income, goods or service to the Sikh organization (a practice known as dasvandh). The Masand was an individual who not only collected these funds but also taught tenets of Sikhism and settled civil disputes in their region, similar to a vicar or parish priest in Christianity. The dasvandh financed the building of gurdwaras and langars (shared communal kitchens).

Guru Arjan was arrested under the orders of the Mughal Emperor Jahangir, who accused him of supporting a rebellion under Khusrau Mirza. After refusing to convert to Islam, Arjan was tortured and executed in 1606. Historical records and the Sikh tradition are unclear as to whether Arjan was executed by drowning or died during torture. The Sikh tradition states the Guru's execution was a part of the ongoing persecution of the Sikhs under the Mughal Empire. His martyrdom is considered a watershed event in the history of Sikhism. It is remembered as Shaheedi Divas of Guru Arjan in May or June according to the Nanakshahi calendar released by the Shiromani Gurdwara Parbandhak Committee in 2003.

== Biography ==
=== Early life ===
Guru Arjan was born in Goindval to Bibi Bhani and Jetha Sodhi. Bibi Bhani was the daughter of Guru Amar Das, and her husband Jetha Sodhi later came to be known as Guru Ram Das. Arjan's birthplace site is now memorialized as the Gurdwara Chaubara Sahib. He had two brothers: Prithi Chand and Mahadev. Various Sikh chroniclers give his birth year as 1553 or 1563, the latter is accepted by scholarly consensus as the actual year of birth with 15 April as the accepted birth date.

Guru Arjan spent the first 11 years of his life in Goindwal and the next seven years with his father in Ramdaspur. Per Sikh tradition, he had stayed for two years in Lahore during his youth after being sent by his father to attend the wedding of his first cousin Sahari Mal's son as well as to establish a Sikh congregation. He was appointed as the Sikh Guru in 1581 after the death of his father. Guru Ram Das was a Khatri of the Sodhi sub-caste. With Arjan's succession, the Guruship remained in the Sodhi family of Guru Ram Das.

=== Marriages ===
According to historians, Guru Arjan wedded twice. His first wife was Mata Ram Dei, whom he married on 20 June 1579. His second wife was Mata Ganga, their wedding taking place on 19 May 1589. Popular Sikh tradition omits his first wife and claims he was only married to Ganga. According to Mohinder Kaur Gill, Sikh tradition states that Mata Ram Dei could not produce a child for Guru Arjan, thus she persuaded him to marry another woman. Another version claims Mata Ram Dei died so the guru married again.

=== Succession and time as Guru ===
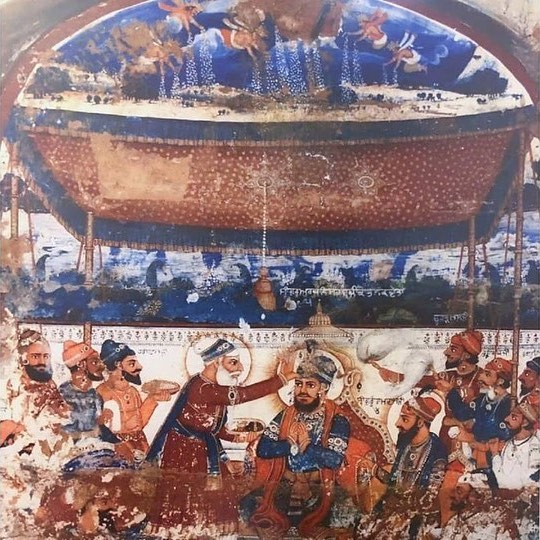
Fresco of Baba Buddha crowning Guru Arjan as the next guru by placing tilak on his forehead, known as the Gurgadi ceremony. Guru Ram Das is depicted to the immediate bottom right of Arjan.

Guru Ram Das chose Arjan, the youngest, to succeed him as the fifth Sikh Guru. Mahadev, the middle brother chose the life of an ascetic. His choice of Guru Arjan as successor, as throughout most of the history of Sikh Guru successions, led to disputes and internal divisions among the Sikhs.

The succession dispute regarding Guru Arjan created a schism that yielded different narratives for the two factions. In the orthodox Sikh tradition, Prithi Chand is remembered as vehemently opposing Guru Arjan, creating a factional sect of the Sikh community. The Sikhs following Arjan referred to the breakaway faction as Minas (literally, "scoundrels"). Prithi Chand and his followers attempted to assassinate the young Hargobind thrice. Prithi Chand also befriended Mughal agents. Subsequent written competing texts written by the Minas, on the other hand, offered a different explanation for the attempt on Hargobind's life, and present him as devoted to his younger brother Arjan. The eldest son of Prithi Chand, Miharvan, is mentioned in both traditions as having received tutelage from both Prithi Chand and Arjan as a child.

The competing texts acknowledge the disagreements. They state Prithi Chand left Amritsar, became the Sahib Guru after the martyrdom of Guru Arjan and one who disputed the succession of Hargobind as the next Guru. The followers of Prithi Chand considered themselves the true followers of Guru Nanak as they rejected the increasing emphasis on militarization of the panth under Hargobind to resist Mughal persecution in the wake of Arjan's martyrdom, in favor of non-violent interiorization. In addition to Prithi Chand, a son of Guru Amar Das named Baba Mohan had also challenged the authority of Arjan. These challenging claims were asserted by the early Sikh sects in part by their manuscripts of Sikh hymns. Baba Mohan possessed the Goindval pothi containing the hymns of Nanak and other early Gurus, while Prithi Chand possessed the Guru Harsahai pothi then believed to have been the oldest scripture from the time of Nanak. This, state scholars, may have triggered Guru Arjan to create a much enlarged, official version of the Adi Granth.

Upon the first parkash of the Adi Granth according to Gurbilas, Guru Arjan said, "Listen you all to my directive. And believe it as ever true. Accept the Granth as equal with the Guru. And think no distinctions between the two."

The mainstream Sikh tradition recognised Guru Arjan as the fifth Guru, and Hargobind as the sixth Guru. Arjan, at age 18, became the fifth Guru in 1581 inheriting the title from his father. After his execution by the Muslim officials of the Mughal Empire, his son Hargobind became the sixth Guru in 1606 CE.

=== Execution ===
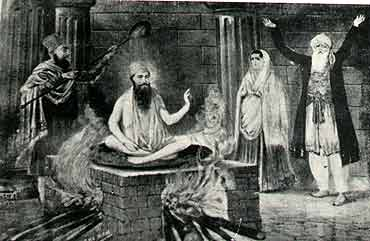
Painting of the torture and martyrdom of Arjan by the Punjabi painter Sri Ram (1876 – 1926)

Guru Arjan died in Mughal custody; this has been one of the defining, though controversial, issues in Sikh history.

Most Mughal historians considered Guru Arjan's execution as a political event, stating that the Sikhs had become formidable as a social group, and Sikh Gurus became actively involved in the Punjabi political conflicts. A similar theory floated in the early 20th-century, asserts that this was just a politically-motivated single execution. According to this theory, there was an ongoing Mughal dynasty dispute between Jahangir and his son Khusrau suspected of rebellion by Jahangir, wherein Arjan blessed Khusrau and thus the losing side. Jahangir was jealous and outraged, and therefore he ordered the Guru's execution. But according to Jahangir's own autobiography, most probably he didn't understand the importance of Sikh gurus. He referred to Arjan as a Hindu, who had "captured many of the simple-hearted of the Hindus and even of the ignorant and foolish followers of Islam, by his ways and manners...for the three or four generations (of spiritual successors) they had kept this shop warm." The execution of Arjan marks a sharp contrast to Jahangir's tolerant attitude towards other religions such as Hinduism and Christianity.

But even earlier, there has been dispute between emperor Akbar and Guru Arjan and his peasant base regarding the new land revenue system of Mughal empire. Akbar had visited the guru at Goindwal and land revenue of Bari doab was subsequently exempted.

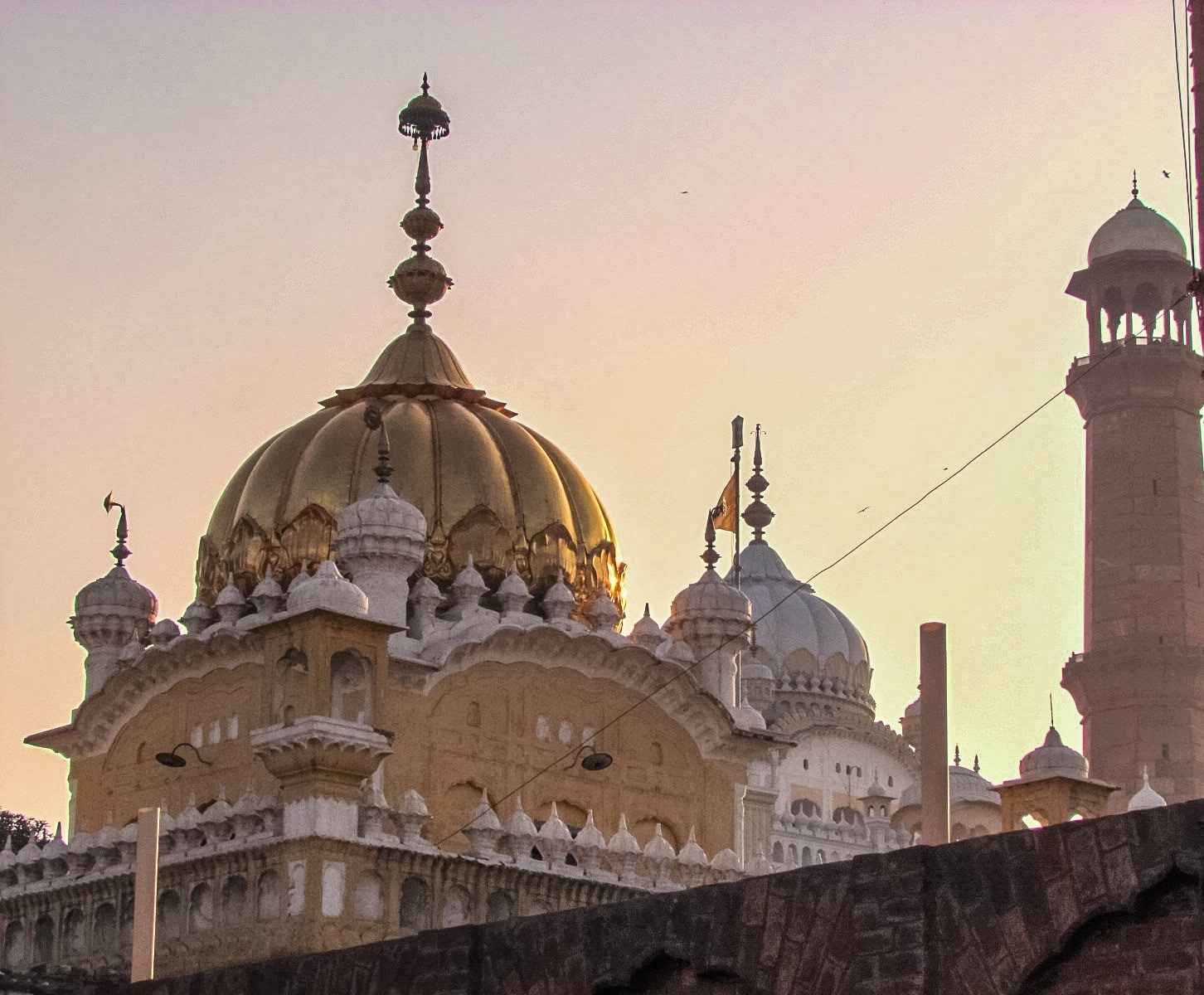
The Gurdwara Dera Sahib in Lahore, Pakistan, commemorates the spot where Guru Arjan Dev is traditionally believed to have died.

The Sikh tradition has a competing view. It states that the Guru's execution was a part of the ongoing persecution of the Sikhs by Islamic authorities in the Mughal Empire, and that the Mughal rulers of Punjab were alarmed at the growth of the Panth. According to Jahangir's autobiography Tuzk-e-Jahangiri (Jahangirnama) which discussed Arjan's support for his rebellious son Khusrau, too many people were becoming persuaded by Arjan's teachings and if Arjan did not become a Muslim, the Sikh Panth had to be extinguished. (Note: The following is from Jahangir's memoirs: There was a Hindu named Arjan in Gobindwal on the banks of the Beas River. Pretending to be a spiritual guide, he had won over as devotees many simple-minded Indians and even some ignorant, stupid Muslims by broadcasting his claims to be a saint. They called him a guru. Many fools from all around had recourse to him and believed in him implicitly. For three or four generations they had been peddling this same stuff. For a long time, I had been thinking that either this false trade should be eliminated or that he should be brought into the embrace of Islam. At length, when Khusraw passed by there, this inconsequential little fellow wished to pay homage to Khusraw. When Khusraw stopped at his residence, [Arjan] came out and had an interview with [Khusraw]. Giving him some elementary spiritual precepts picked up here and there, he made a mark with saffron on his forehead, which is called qashqa in the idiom of the Hindus and which they consider lucky. When this was reported to me, I realized how perfectly false he was and ordered him brought to me. I awarded his houses and dwellings and those of his children to Murtaza Khan, and I ordered his possessions and goods confiscated and him executed. – Emperor Jahangir's Memoirs, Jahangirnama 27b-28a, (Translator: Wheeler M. Thackston))

In 1606 CE, the Guru was imprisoned in Lahore Fort, where by some accounts he was tortured and executed, and by other accounts, the method of his death remains unresolved. The traditional Sikh account states that the Mughal emperor Jahangir demanded a fine of 200,000 rupees and demanded that Arjan erase some of the hymns in the text that he found offensive. The Guru refused to remove the lines and pay the fine which, the Sikh accounts state, led to his execution. Some Muslim traditional accounts such as of Latif in 19th-century states that Arjan was dictatorial, someone who lived in splendour with "costly attire", who had left aside the rosary and the clothes of a saint (fakir). Shaikh Ahmad Sirhindi cheered the punishment and execution of Arjun, calling the Sikh Guru an infidel. (Note: This is from records of Shaikh Ahmad Sirhindi, composed after the punishment and execution of Guru Arjun: These days the accursed infidel of Gobindwal was very fortunately killed. It is a cause of great defeat for the reprobate Hindus. With whatever intention and purpose they are killed – the humiliation of infidels is for Muslims, life itself. Before this Kafir (Infidel) was killed, I had seen in a dream that the Emperor of the day had destroyed the crown of the head of Shirk or infidelity. It is true that this infidel [Guru Arjun] was the chief of the infidels and a leader of the Kafirs. The object of levying Jizya (tax on non-Muslims) on them is to humiliate and insult the Kafirs, and Jihad against them and hostility towards them are the necessities of the Mohammedan faith. – Shaikh Ahmad Sirhindi, Letter to Murtaza Khan, On the execution of Guru Arjan) In contrast, Mian Mir – the Sufi friend of Arjan, lobbied when Jehangir ordered the execution and the confiscation of Arjan's property, then got the confiscation order deferred, according to Rishi Singh.

Some scholars state that the evidence is unclear whether his death was due to execution, torture or forced drowning in the Ravi River. J.S. Grewal notes that Sikh sources from the seventeenth and eighteenth-century contain contradictory reports of Arjan's death. J. F. Richard states that Jahangir was persistently hostile to popularly venerated saints, not just Sikhism. Bhai Gurdas was a contemporary of Arjan and is a noted 17th-century Sikh chronicler. His eyewitness account recorded Arjan's life, and the order by Emperor Jahangir to torture the Guru to death.

A contemporary Jesuit account, written by Spanish Jesuit missionary Jerome Xavier (1549–1617), who was in Lahore at the time, records that the Sikhs tried to get Jahangir to commute the torture and death sentence to a heavy fine, but this attempt failed. Dabistan-i Mazahib Mobad states Jahangir tortured Arjan in the hopes of extracting the money and public repudiation of his spiritual convictions, but the Guru refused and was executed. Jerome Xavier, in appreciation of the courage of Guru Arjun, wrote back to Lisbon, that Arjan suffered and was tormented.

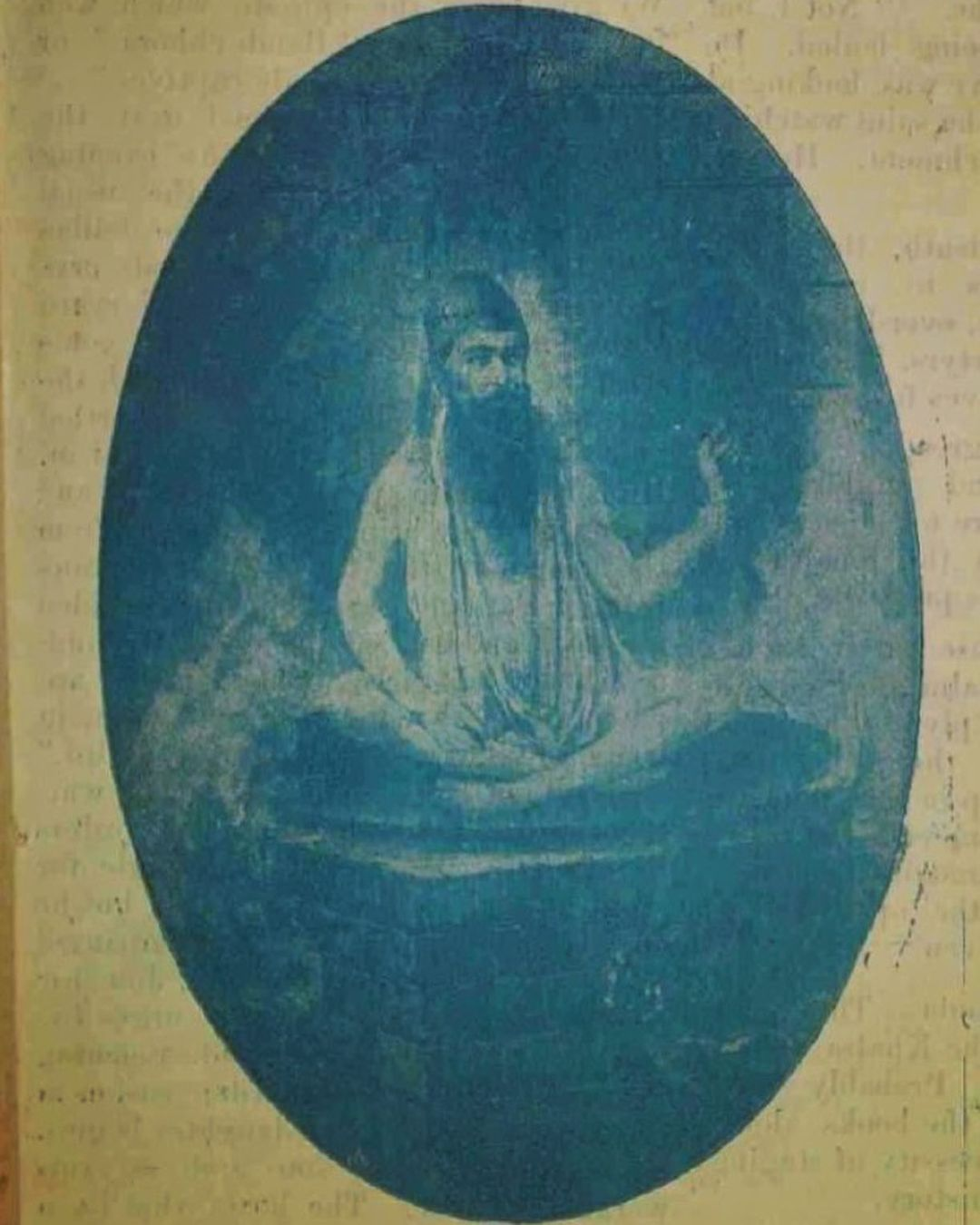
Detail of a depiction of Guru Arjan Dev's martyrdom, from the front-page of the Thursday, 13 April 1933 Vaisakhi edition of 'The Khalsa', published from Lahore.

According to the Sikh tradition, before his execution, Arjan instructed his son and successor Hargobind to take up arms, and resist tyranny. His execution led the Sikh Panth to become armed and pursue resistance to persecution under the Mughal rule. Michael Barnes states that the resolve and death of Arjun strengthened the conviction among Sikhs that, "personal piety must have a core of moral strength. A virtuous soul must be a courageous soul. Willingness to suffer trial for one's convictions was a religious imperative".

There are several stories and versions about how, where and why Arjan died. Recent scholarship have offered alternative analyses, wary of "exaggerating fragmentary traces of documentary evidence in historical analysis". The alternate versions include stories about the role of Arjan in a conflict between the Mughal Emperor Jahangir and his son who Jahangir suspected of trying to organize a patricidal coup. An alternate version highlights the role of a Hindu minister of Jahangir named Chandu Shah. He, in one version, takes revenge on Arjan for not marrying his son Hargobind to Chandu Shah's daughter. In another Lahore version, Chandu Shah actually prevents Arjan from suffering torture and death by Muslims by paying 200,000 rupees (100,000 crusados) to Jahangir, but then keeps him and emotionally torments him to death in his house. Several alternative versions of the story try to absolve Jahangir and the Mughal empire of any responsibility, but have no trace or support in the documentary evidence from early 17th century, such as the records of Jesuit priest Jerome Xavier and the memoirs of Jahangir.

== Legacy ==
=== Amritsar ===
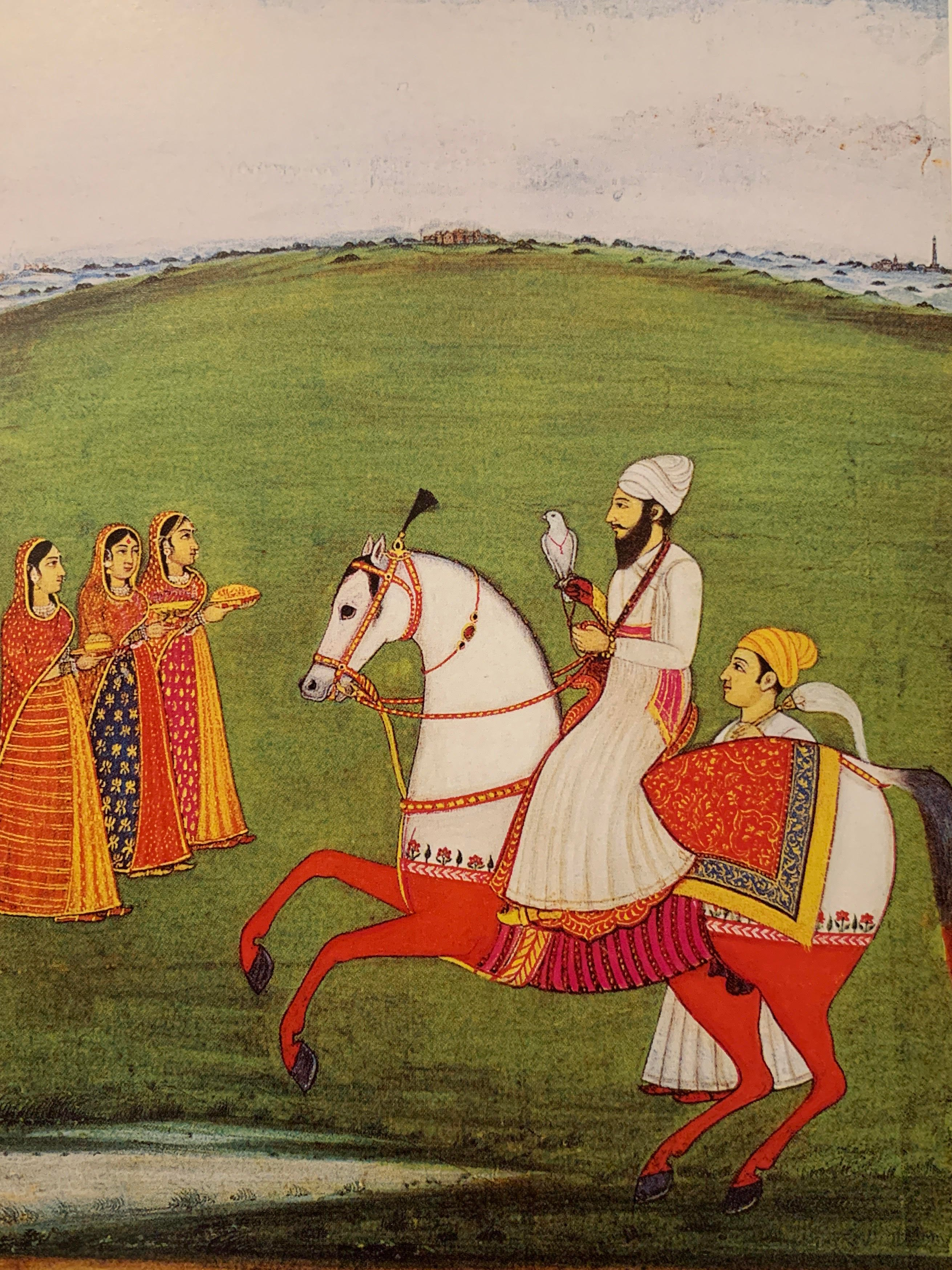
Guru Arjan hunting while mounted on horseback with a hawk. Painting from Faizabad, circa 1760.

Guru Arjan's father Guru Ram Das founded the town named after him "Ramdaspur", around a large man-made water pool called "Ramdas Sarovar". Arjan continued the infrastructure-building effort of his father. The town expanded during the time of guru Arjan, financed by donations and constructed by voluntary work. The pool area grew into a temple complex with the Gurdwara Harmandir Sahib near the pool. Guru Arjan installed the scripture of Sikhism inside the new temple in 1604. The city that emerged is now known as Amritsar, and is the holiest pilgrimage site in Sikhism.

Continuing the efforts of Ram Das, guru Arjan established Amritsar as a primary Sikh pilgrimage destination. He wrote a voluminous amount of Sikh scripture including the popular Sukhmani Sahib. Guru Arjan is credited with completing many other infrastructure projects, such as water reservoirs called Santokhsar (Pond of Contentment) and Gongsar (Pond of Bells), founding the towns of Tarn Taran, Kartarpur and Hargobindpur.Research has linked alignment of Guru Arjan's Tarn Taran Gurudwara sarovar with the historic Delhi–Lahore Royal Road through surviving Kos Minars in the region.

==== Community expansion ====
While having completing the Harmandir Sahib with dasvand donations during the first decade of his guruship between 1581 and 1589, creating a rallying point for the community and a center for Sikh activity, and a place for the installment of the Adi Granth, Guru Arjan had also gone on a tour of Majha and Doaba in Punjab, where he would found the towns. Due to their central location in the Punjab heartland, the ranks of Sikhs would swell, especially among the Jat peasantry, and create a level of prosperity for them; Arjan would serve not only as a spiritual mentor but as a true emperor (sacchā pādshāh) for his followers in his own right.

=== Adi Granth ===
According to the Sikh tradition, Arjan compiled the Adi Granth by collecting hymns of past Gurus from many places, then rejecting those that he considered as fakes or to be diverging from the teachings of the Gurus. His approved collection included hymns from the first four Gurus of Sikhism, those he composed, as well as 17 Hindu bards and 2 Muslim bards (Bhagats). The compilation was completed on 30 August 1604, according to the Sikh tradition and installed in the Harmandir Sahib temple on 1 September 1604.

Arjan was a prolific poet who composed 2,218 hymns. More than half of the volume of Guru Granth Sahib and the largest collection of hymns has been composed by Arjan. According to Christopher Shackle and Arvind-Pal Singh Mandair, Arjan's compositions combined spiritual message in an "encyclopedic linguistic sophistication" with "Braj Bhasha forms and learned Sanskrit vocabulary".

After Arjan completed and installed the Adi Granth in the Harimandir Sahib, Mughal emperor Akbar was informed of the development with the allegation that it contained teachings hostile to Islam. He ordered a copy be brought to him. Arjan sent him a copy on a thali (plate), with the following message that was later added to the expanded text:

In this thali (dish) you will find three things – truth, peace and contemplation:
in this too the nectar Name which is the support of all humanity.

— AG 1429, Translated by William Owen Cole and Piara Singh Sambhi

The Akbarnama by Abu'l-Fazl Allami mentions that Arjan met the Mughal emperor Akbar and his cortege in 1598. According to Louis Fenech, this meeting likely influenced the development of Sikh manuscriptology and the later martial tradition.

One of the Sikh community disputes following Guru Ram Das was the emergence of new hymns claiming to have been composed by Nanak. According to the faction led by Arjan, these hymns were distorted and fake, with some blaming Prithi Chand and his Sikh faction for having composed and circulated them. The concern and the possibility of wrong propaganda, immoral teachings and inauthentic Gurbani led Arjan to initiate a major effort to collect, study, approve and compile a written official scripture, and this he called Adi Granth, the first edition of the Sikh scripture by 1604.

The composition of both Prithi Chand and his followers have been preserved in the Mina texts of Sikhism, while the mainstream and larger Sikh tradition adopted the Guru Granth Sahib scripture that ultimately emerged from the initiative of Arjan.

== Literature ==
Guru Arjan produced a large amount of literature, which roughly equals that which had been produced by his predecessors combined. Guru Arjan's written works closely follow and are a continuation of the style of his father, Guru Ram Das. For example, Arjan uses the same set of thirty rāgs that his father had set his hymns to and the language of his compositions are favoured toward Sanskritic/Hindi vocabulary. Whilst his individual poems are not as vivid as those authored by Guru Nanak, his vast reworkings accumulate to create a sense of unity within the Ād Granth. Furthermore, Guru Arjan acted as an editor for the compilation of a Sikh scripture, such as by providing supplementary commentary appended to the saloks of the Bhagat Bani and his adoption of the bhagats' shabad hymns. In-addition, he included the Bhatt Bani into the Sikh corpus. He authored vār compositions and added his own verses to the vār compositions which had been originally authored by his predecessors. His eminent work is the Sukhmani Sahib.

== Gallery ==
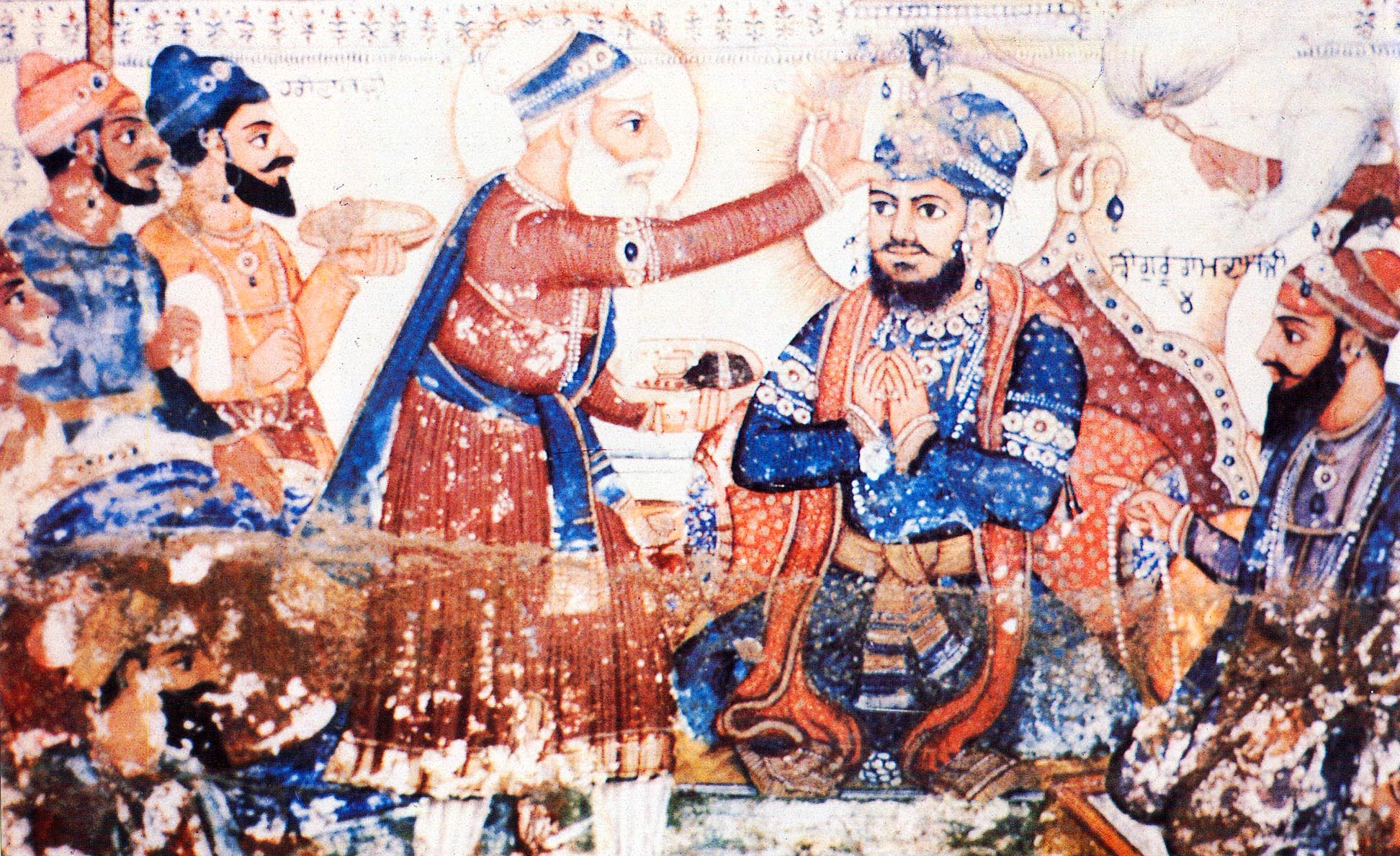
Gurgadi ceremony of Guru Arjan being pronounced as fifth Guru.

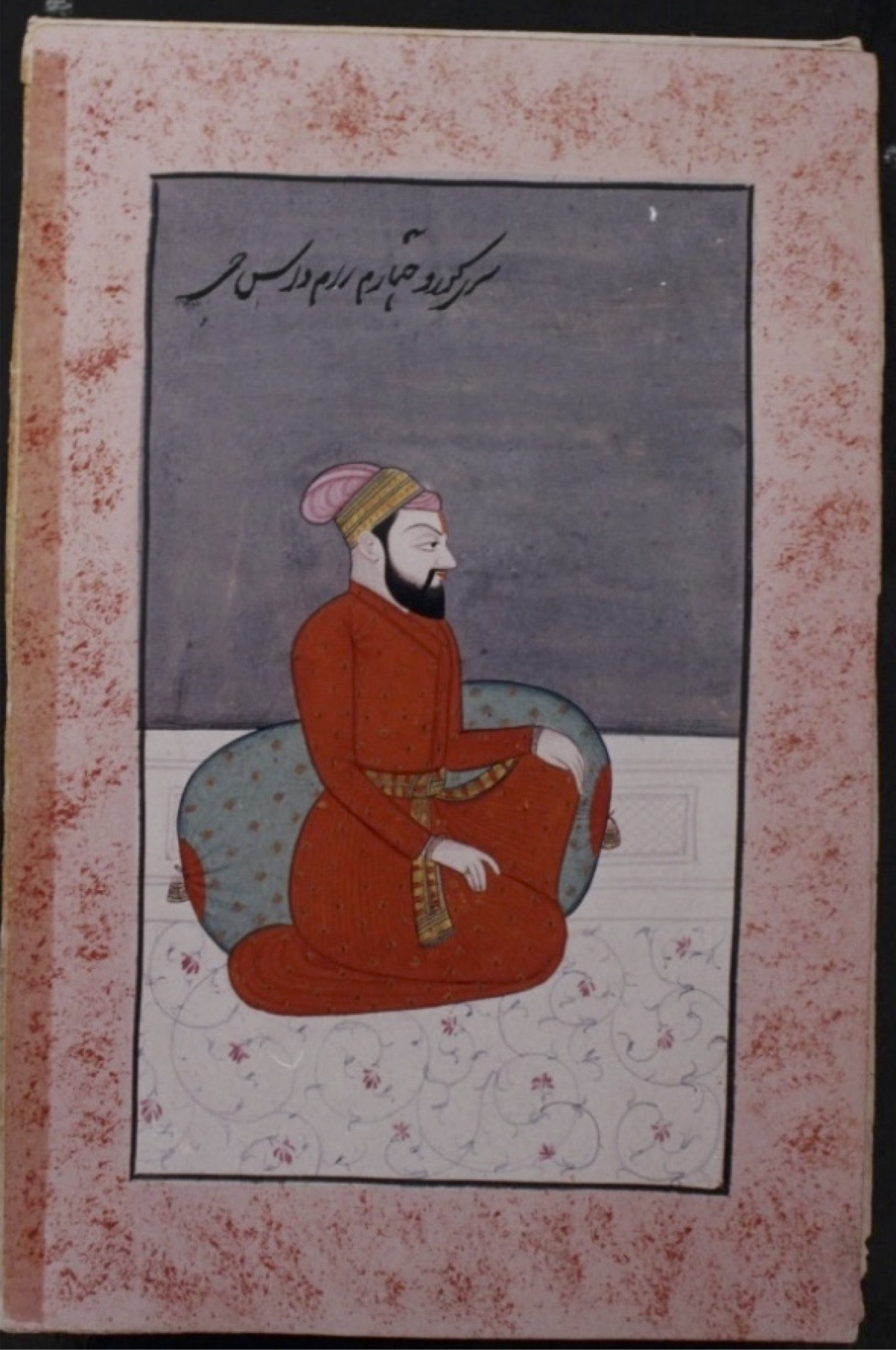
Guru Arjan miniature painting, ca.1800.

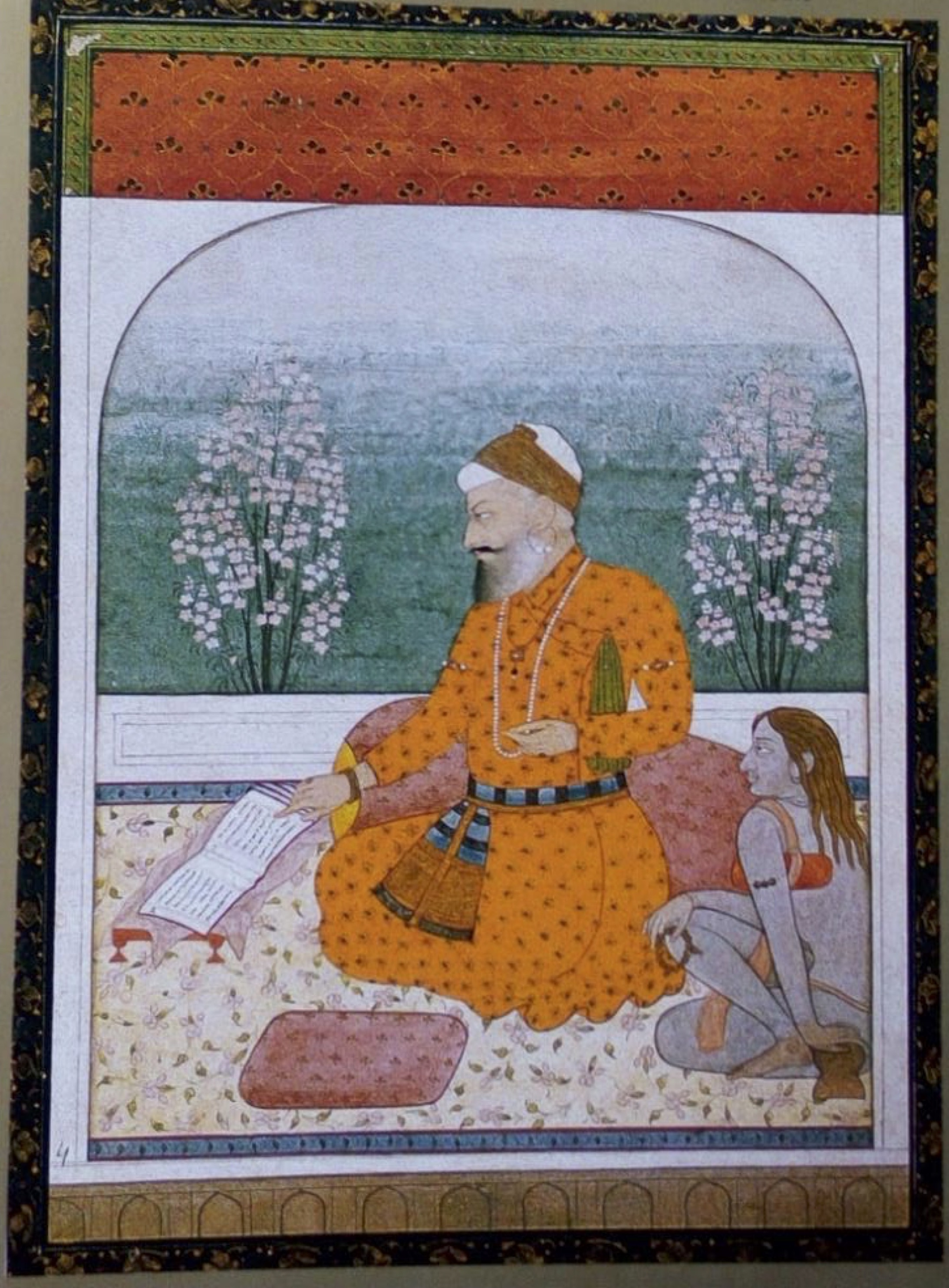
Guru Arjan with Sri Chand, miniature painting.

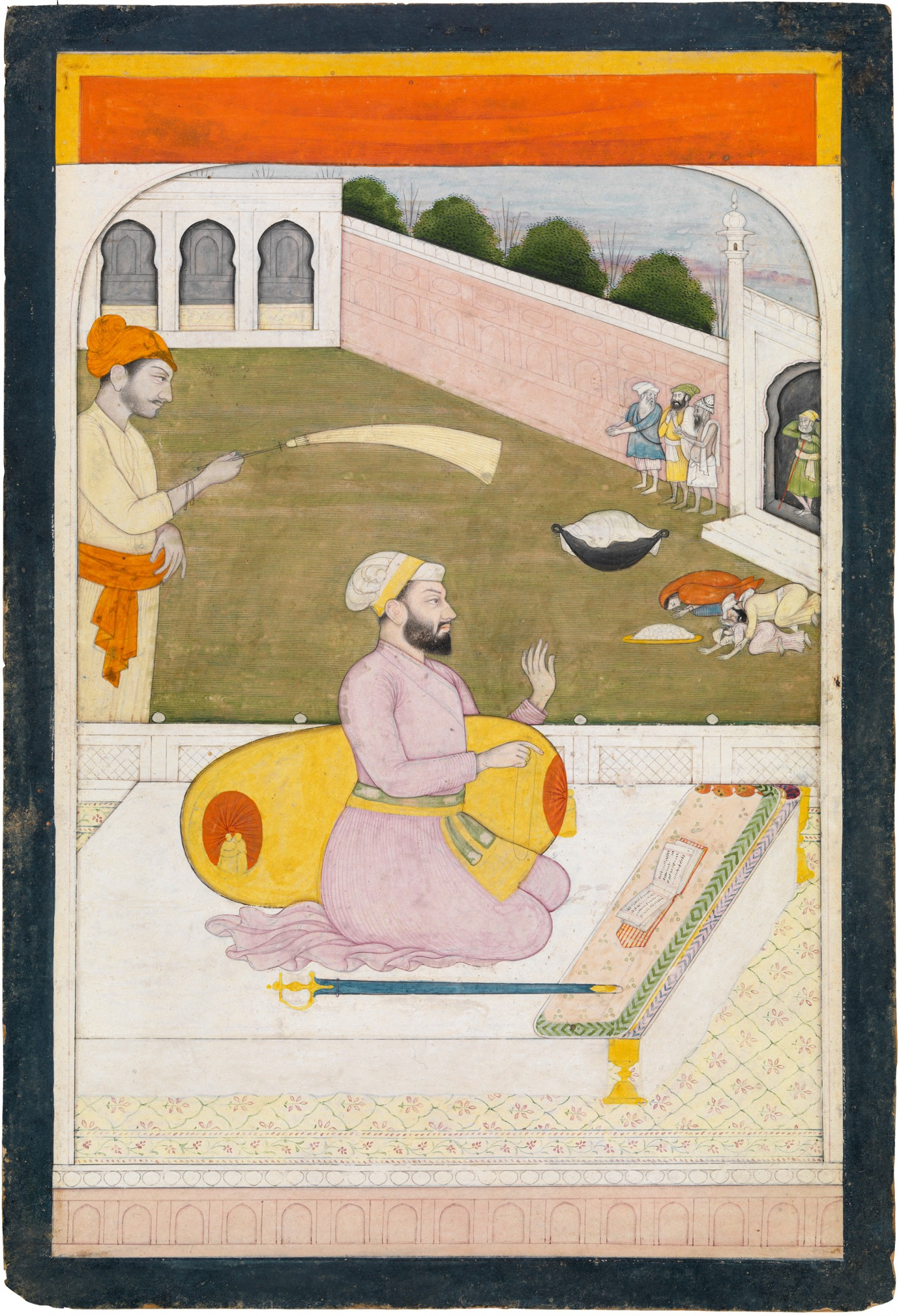
Guru Arjun Dev painting from the family workshop of Nainsukh of Guler.

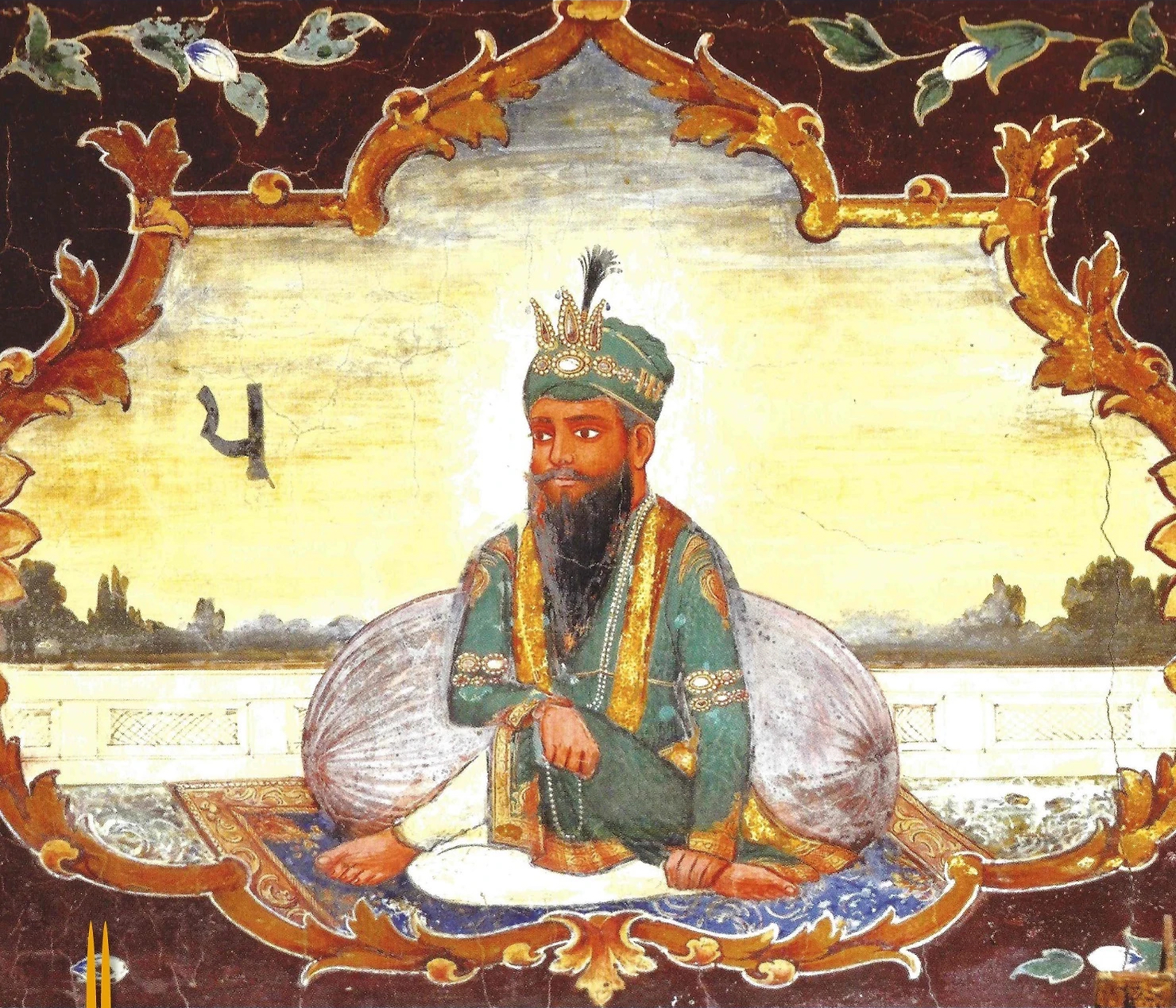
Fresco of Guru Arjan Dev from Goindwal Baoli Sahib.

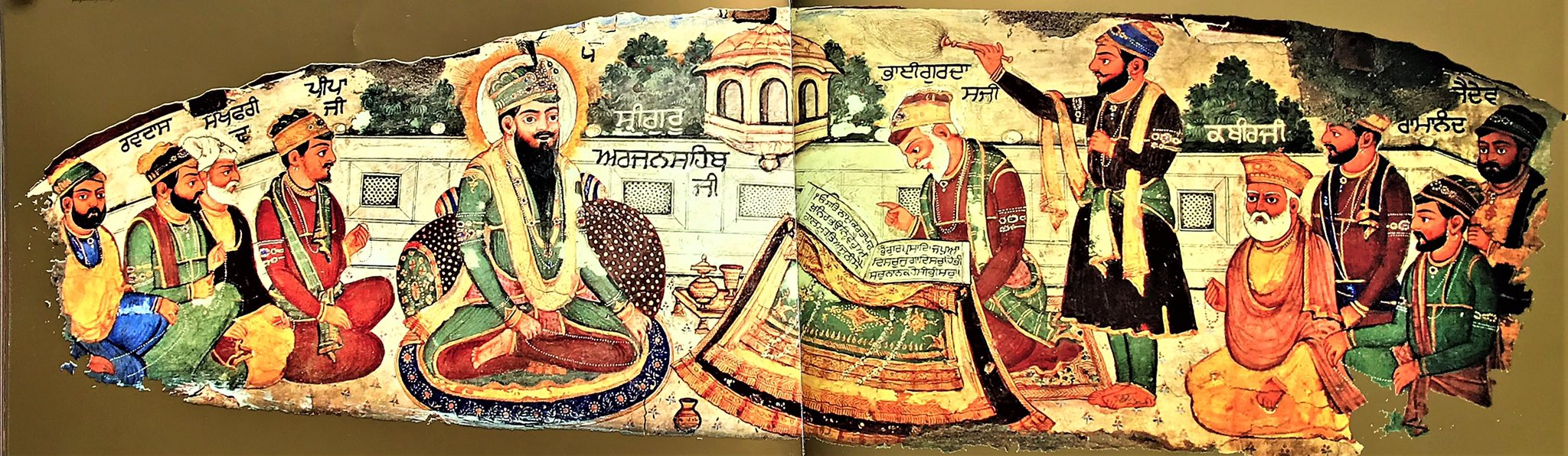
Guru Arjan compiling the Adi Granth with Bhai Gurdas.

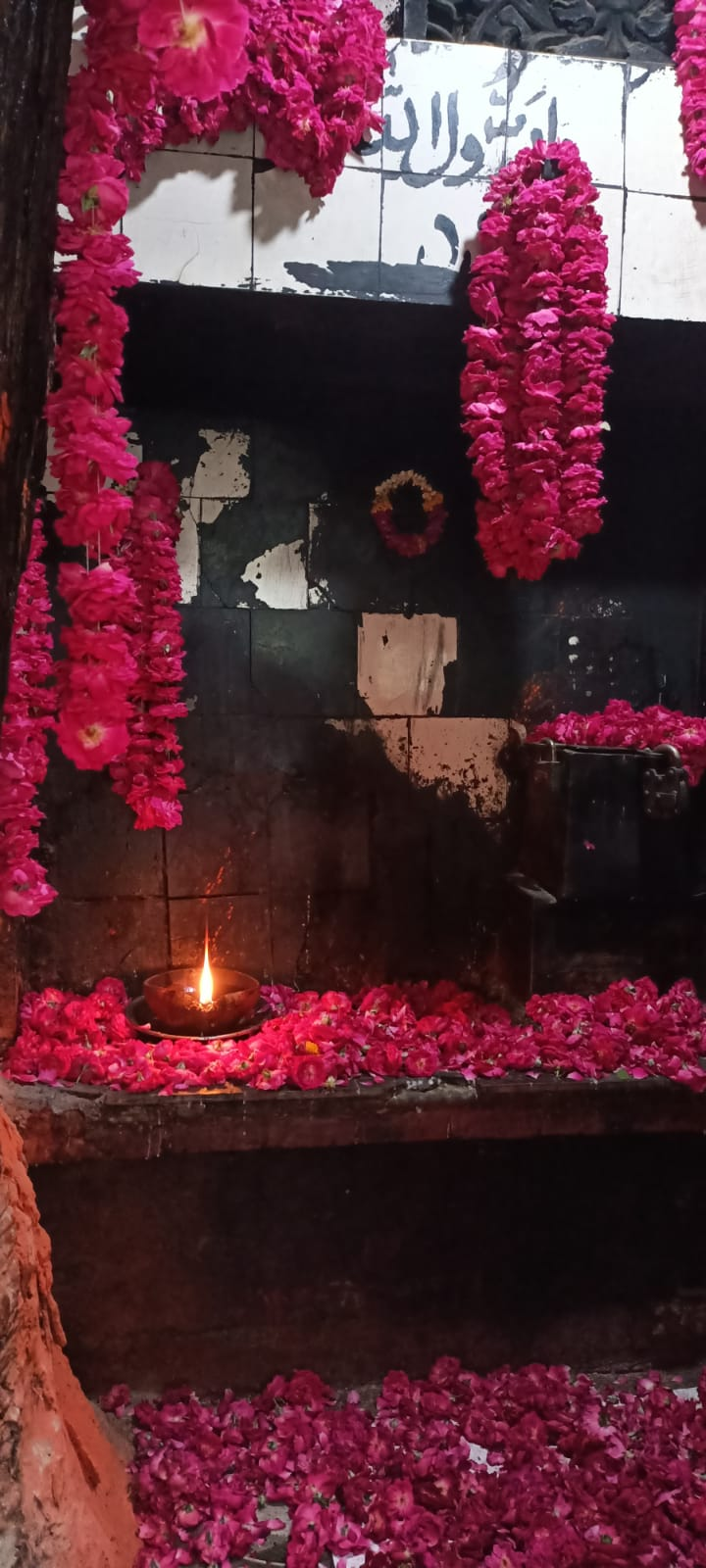
Photograph from Gurdwara Lal Khoohi of the place where Guru Arjan is believed to have been incarcerated

== See also ==
- Sukhmani Sahib
- Guru Granth Sahib
- Sarinda (instrument)

== Notes ==
Preceded by Guru Ram Das	Sikh Guru; 1 September 1581 – 25 May 1606	Succeeded by Guru Har Gobind
