= Raja Nipal Chand =

Founder of the Naru Rajput clan, a converted Suryavanshi Rajput of medieval India

Raja Nipal Chandra
- Raja

Raja of Muttra
- Successor: Raja Ratan Pal
- Born: Muttra
- Died: 1047; Mau, Jalandhar
- Issue: Ratan Pal
- Religion: Sunni Islam

Raja Nipal Chandra was a Raja of a Rajput clan and belonged to the Suryavanshi lineage. He was a direct descendant of Rama. He embraced Islam during the reign of Mahmud of Ghazni and adopted the name Naru Shah (also known as Naru Khan). The Naru Rajput clan is named after him.

== Naru Rajputs ==
The Naru Rajputs are descendants of Maharaja Nipal Chandra of Mathura (“Muttra”). They traced their lineage to Raja Ram Chand. According to tradition, he converted to Islam during the time of Mahmud of Ghazni, adopting the name Naru Shah (نارو شاہ) or Naru Khan (نارو خاں) .

Rose's colonial-era account further adds:

“Confused and conflicting as these various accounts are... the Naru say that their ancestor was a Surajbansi Rajput of Muttra, named Nipal Chandra, and descended from Raja Ram Chand. He was converted in the time of Mahmud of Ghazni and took the name of Naru Shah. Naru Shah settled at Mau in Jullundur, whence his son, Ratan Pal, founded Phillaur. Thence were founded the four Naru parganas of Hariana, Bajwara, Sham Chaurasi and Ghorewaha in Hoshiarpur, and that of Bahram in Jullundur. The chief men of the parganas are still called Rai or Rana. The Naru are all Musalman but keep Brahmans of the Basdeo got.”

Rose also notes that the Narus later served as revenue collectors during the reign of Emperor Akbar, until being displaced by Sikh powers in the 18th century.

== Distribution ==
Colonial census data from 1911 recorded approximately 30,967 Narus in the Jalandhar Division—about 16,000 in Hoshiarpur, 7,100 in Jalandhar, and smaller numbers in neighboring districts.

Following the Partition of India in 1947, most Muslim Narus migrated to Pakistan. Today, they are primarily found in the Punjab and Sindh provinces, particularly in districts such as Sialkot, Lahore, Gujranwala, Sargodha, Mianwali, Bhakkar, Okara, Faisalabad, and others.

== See also ==
- List of Rajputs
