= Palahi =

Palahi Sahib
- Village
- Location in Punjab, India Palahi Sahib (India)
- Coordinates: 31.2571°N 75.7609°E
- Country: India
- State: Punjab
- District: Kapurthala

Languages
  - Official: Punjabi
- Time zone: UTC+5:30 (IST)
- Vehicle registration: PB-09
- Website: https://www.palahi.net/

Palahi (also Plahay, Plahey, Plahi or Palahy) is an historical village in Kapurthala, Punjab, India. Palahi is near Phagwara. Neighbouring villages include Khurampur, Khatti, Barn, Kishanpur, Nangal Maja and Dhak Palahi.

District	Post office	Pin-code	Population	Area	Main road (nearest)	Police station (nearest)
Kapurthala	Palahi	144403	2,700	985 Hectares	National Highway 44 Chandigarh Road, Phagwara	Sadar Thana, Banga Road, Phagwara (4 Kilometer)

== Demographics ==
Population
Religion	Percent
Hindu	50.00%
Sikh	30.00%
Muslim	5.00%
Yaahudi	4.00%
Other	11.00%

Subject	Total	Males	Females
Number of houses	564		
Population	27,45	14,57	1,288
Children (0-6)	245	128	117
Schedule class	11,76	588	588
Backward class	0	0	0
Literacy rate	80.00%	80.51%	79.82%
Workers	996	878	118
Main workers	731	0	0
Middle-class workers	265	222	43

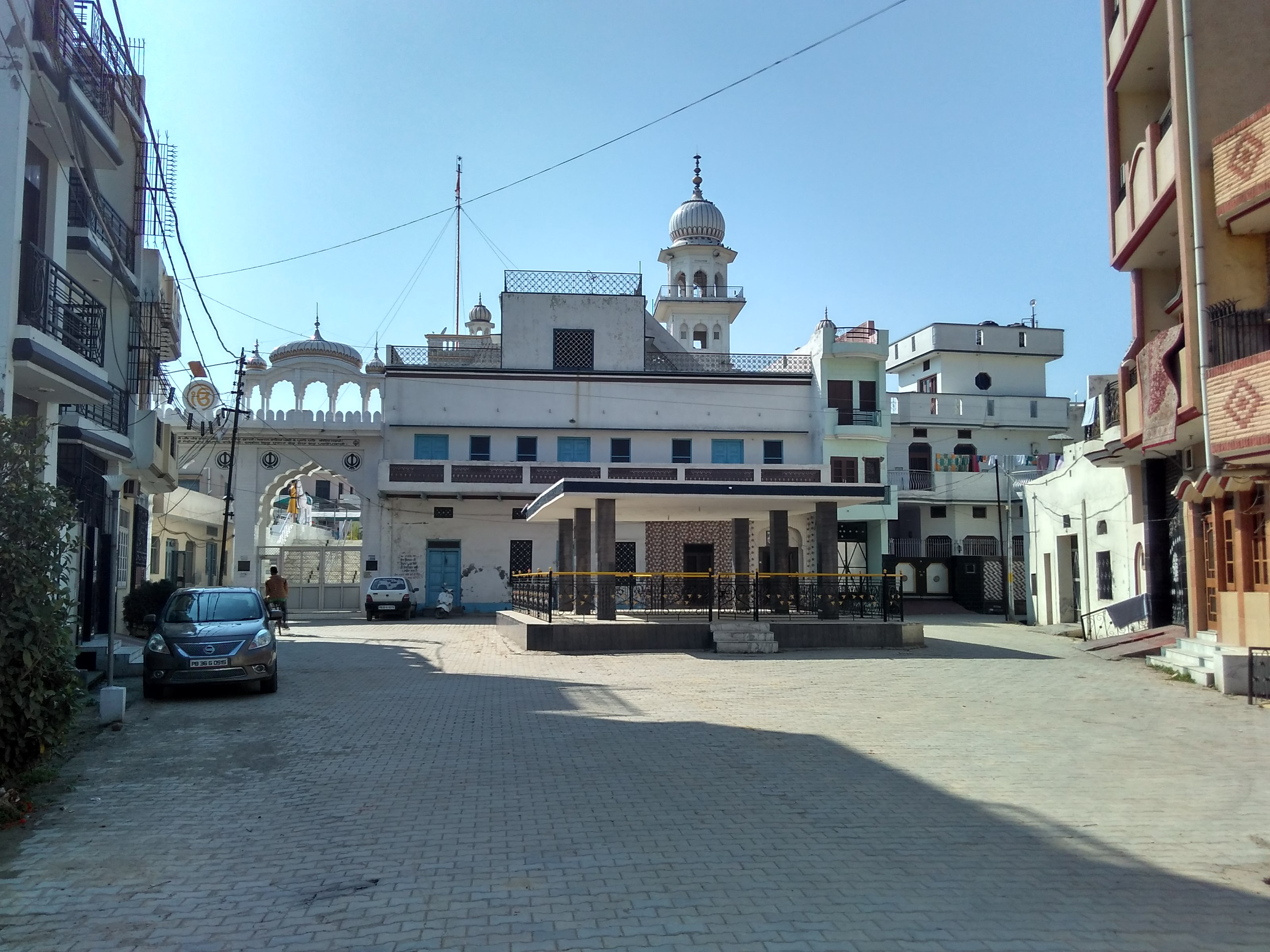
Village (Palahi)

According to the 2011 census, Palahi had a population of 2,745, mainly Jatt Sikhs, with a lesser population of Tarkhan Sikhs, Khatri Sikhs and Hindus. They originate from the regions of Kapurthala in Punjab.

== History ==
According to local legend, Palahi takes its name from Palah (Butea monosperma trees) found in abundance in the area in times gone by.

== Gurduara Chhevin Paatshahi ==
Palahi is the site of the Gurdwara, 'Chhevin Patshahi' Sri Guru Hargobind Sahib Ji to commemorate a battle in 1635, between Sri Guru Hargobind Ji and the invading Mughal forces. Many Sikhs perished during the battle, however, they still emerged victorious. It is during this time that Guru Ji also visited Domeli and Babeli passing Lakhpur before visiting Palahi.

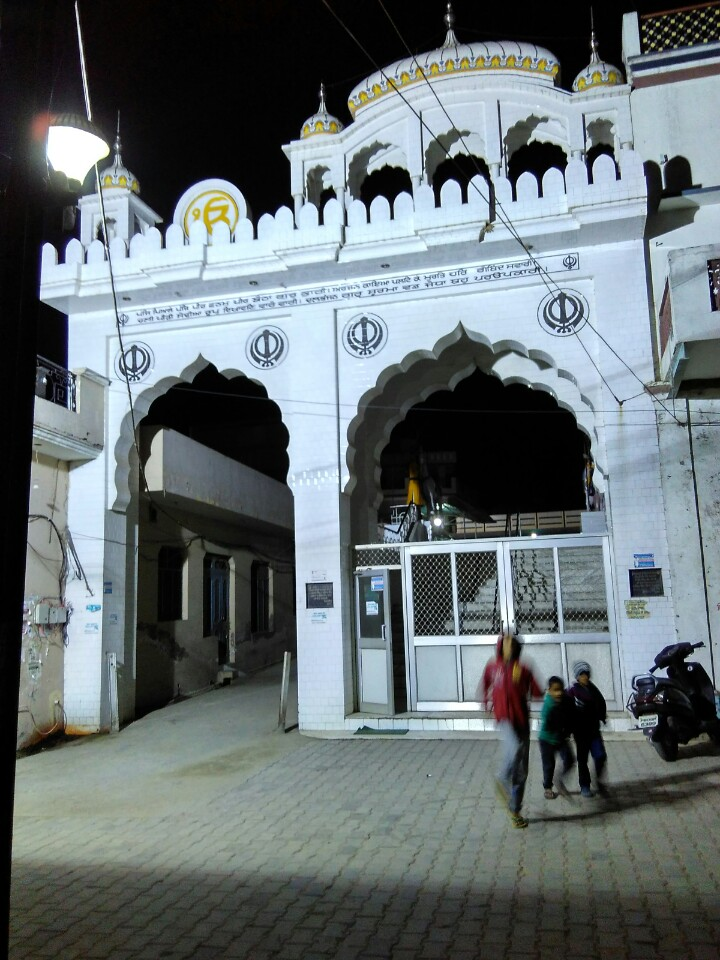
Gurduara Shevi Paatshahi, Plahi Sahib

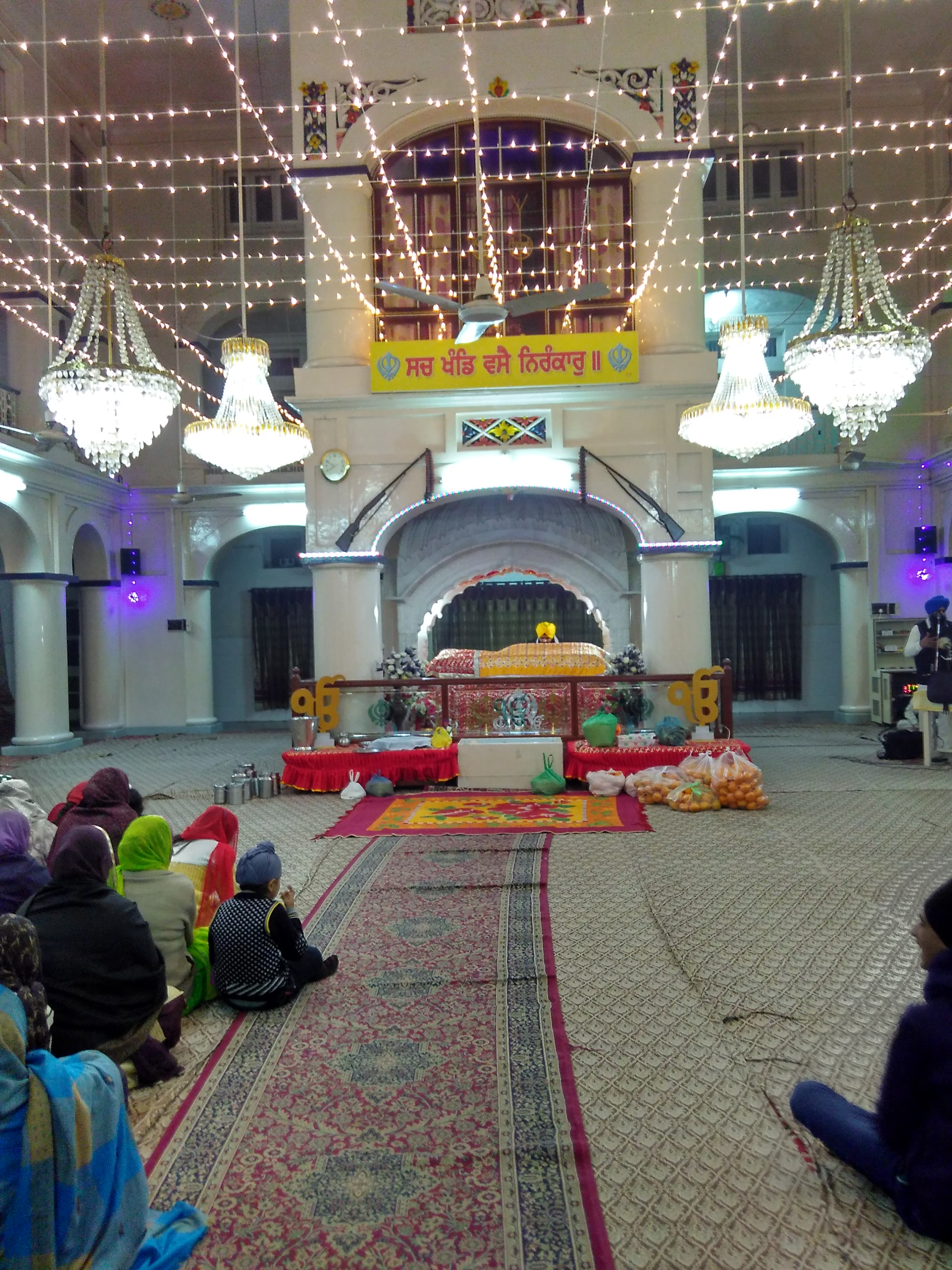
Gurduara Shevi Paatshahi, Plahi Sahib

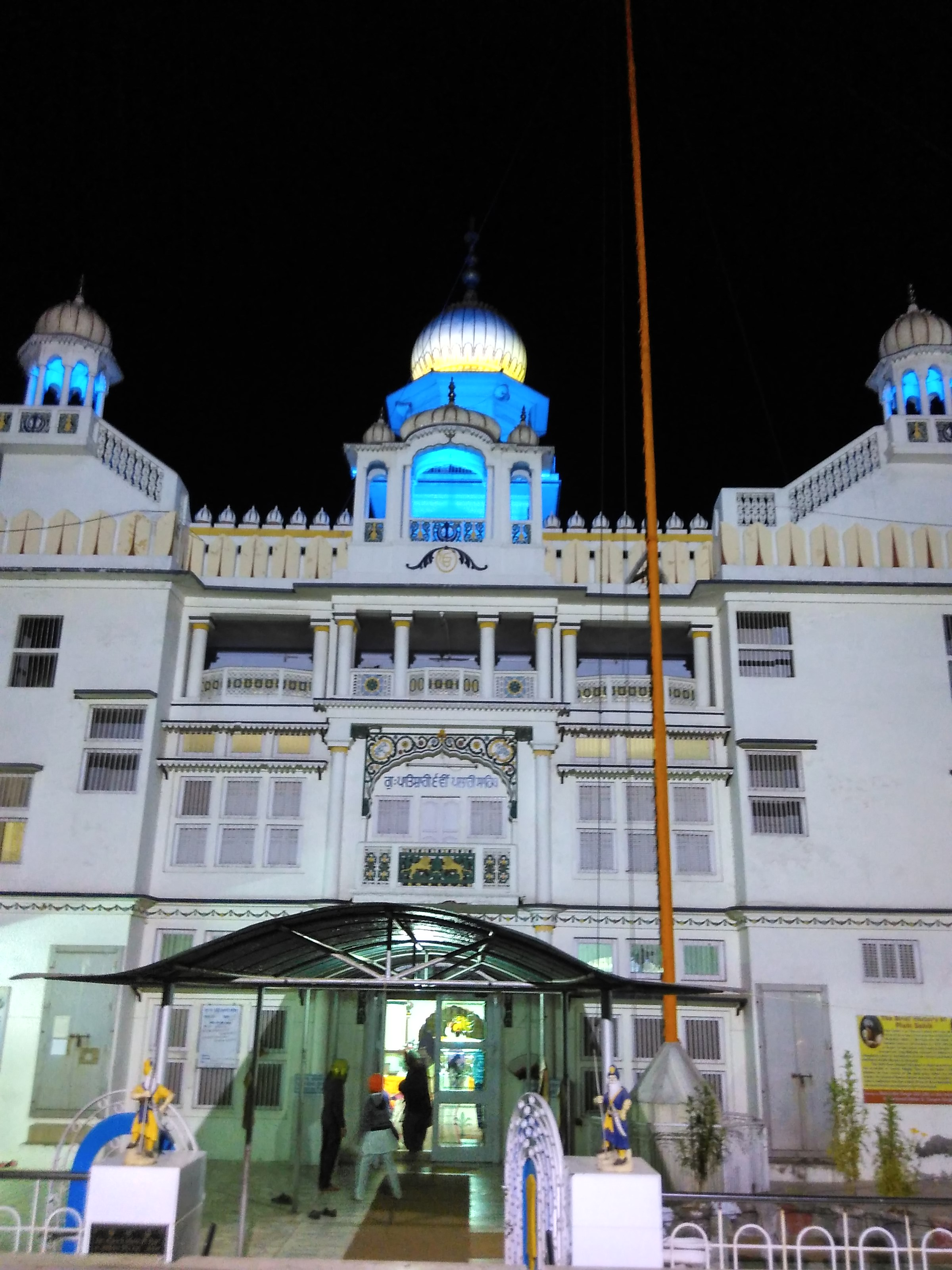
Gurduara Shevi Paatshahi, Plahi Sahib

== Jor Mela ==
Palahi has been hosting a Jor Mela in connection with the Aagman Purb (arrival) of Sri Guru Hargobind Sahib Ji in the village since 1917. The Jor Mela lasts for three days and relates to the 1635 battle of Palahi.

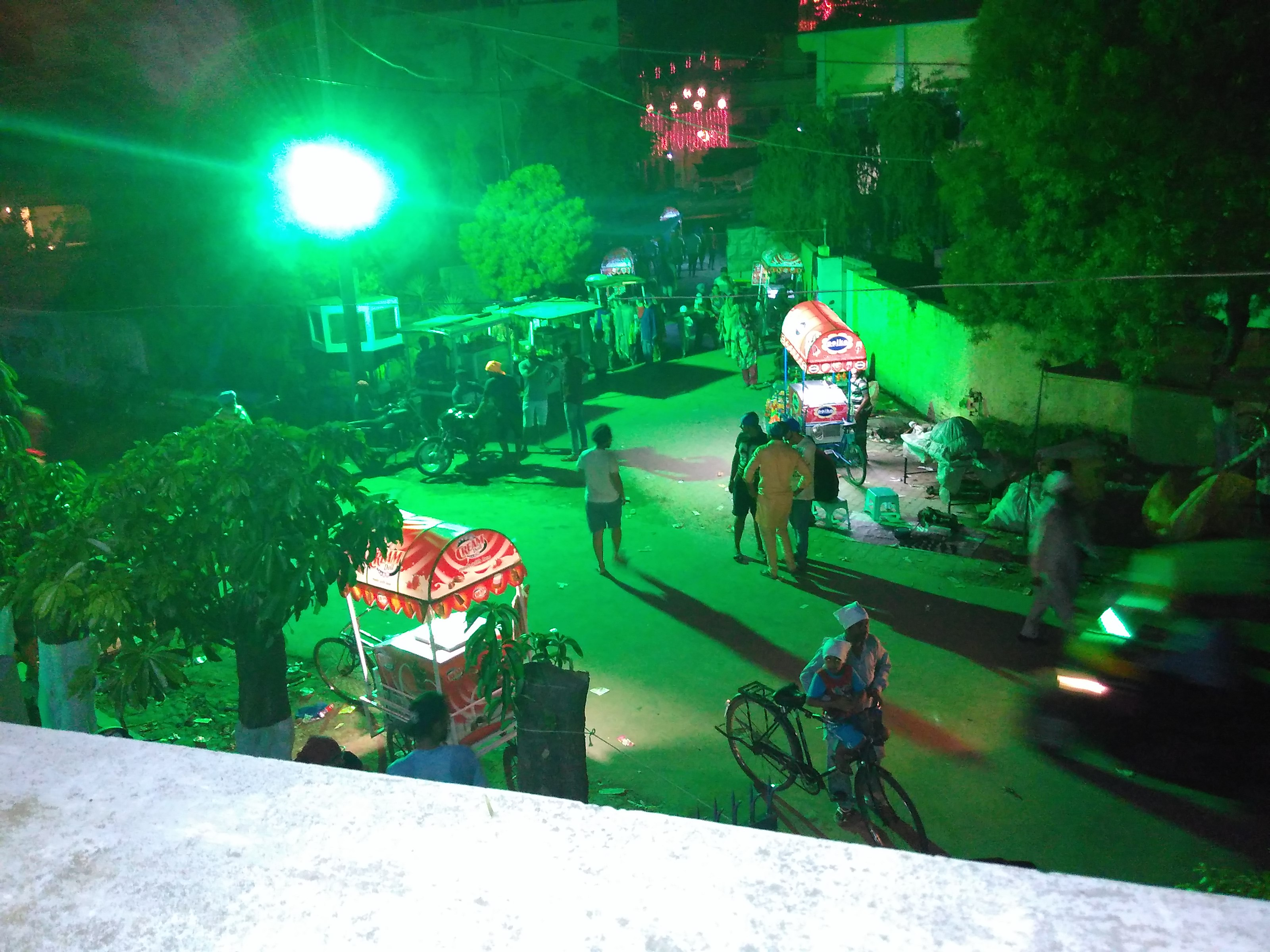
Jor Mela Palahi Sahib

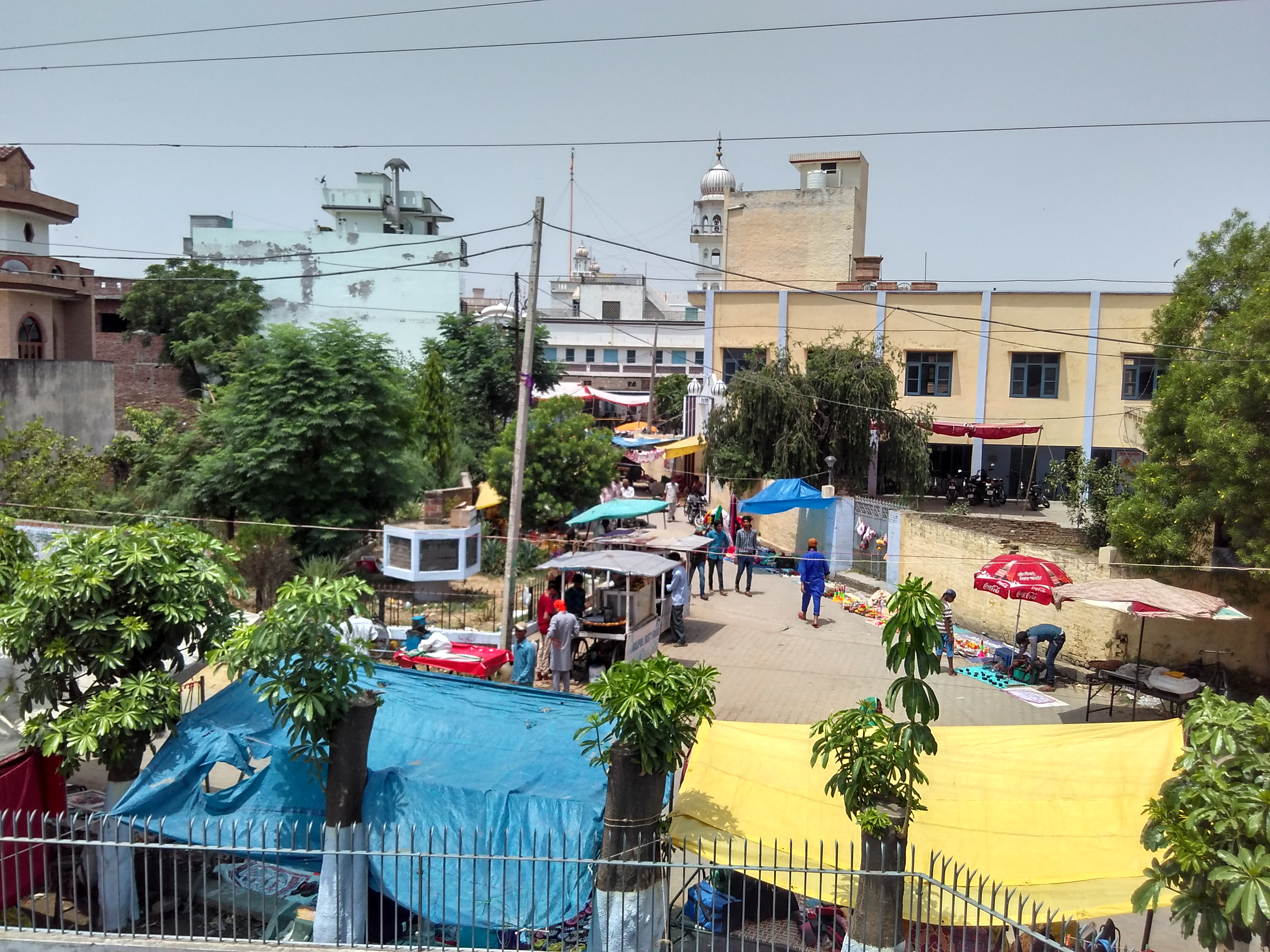
Jor Mela Palahi Sahib

Jor Mela Palahi Sahib

Jor Mela Palahi Sahib

Jor Mela Palahi Sahib

== Education ==
The villagers of Village Palahi with the help of NRIs established the first school in Palahi. The school was set up by prominent villagers including Babu Kartar Singh, Guljara Singh Sagoo, Darbara Singh, Chanda Singh and Atman Singh Sagoo etc. They set up a small school, consisting only of two teachers and ten students. They sought help in developing the Education system, by travelling to Kapurthala and confrontingMaharaja Jagatjit Singh for help. They were then granted funding to build the school, and were able to pay five teachers' salary. Palahi now offers comprehensive education from primary school up to senior secondary school. In addition to this, Prominent Persons of Phagwara Area including S. Jagat Singh Palahi, S. Bhagat Singh Sagoo, S. Sampuran Singh Ranipur, S. Tarlochan Singh, Advocate S. N. Chopra and Prof. Piara Singh Bhogal formed an NGO Named National Rural Development Society, Palahi in 1983 and they Started a Rural Institute named National Institute for Integrated Rural Development and Transfer of Technology, Palahi in 1986, which is still successful and running today. in the year 2014, Industrial Training Institutes is started in name of Jagat Singh Palahi . This Jagat Singh Palahi Industrial Training Institute is a training institute which provide training in technical field and run under Directorate General of Employment & Training (DGET), Ministry of Labour & Employment, Union Government of India and Department of Technical Education and Industrial Training (IT Wing), Govt. of Punjab.

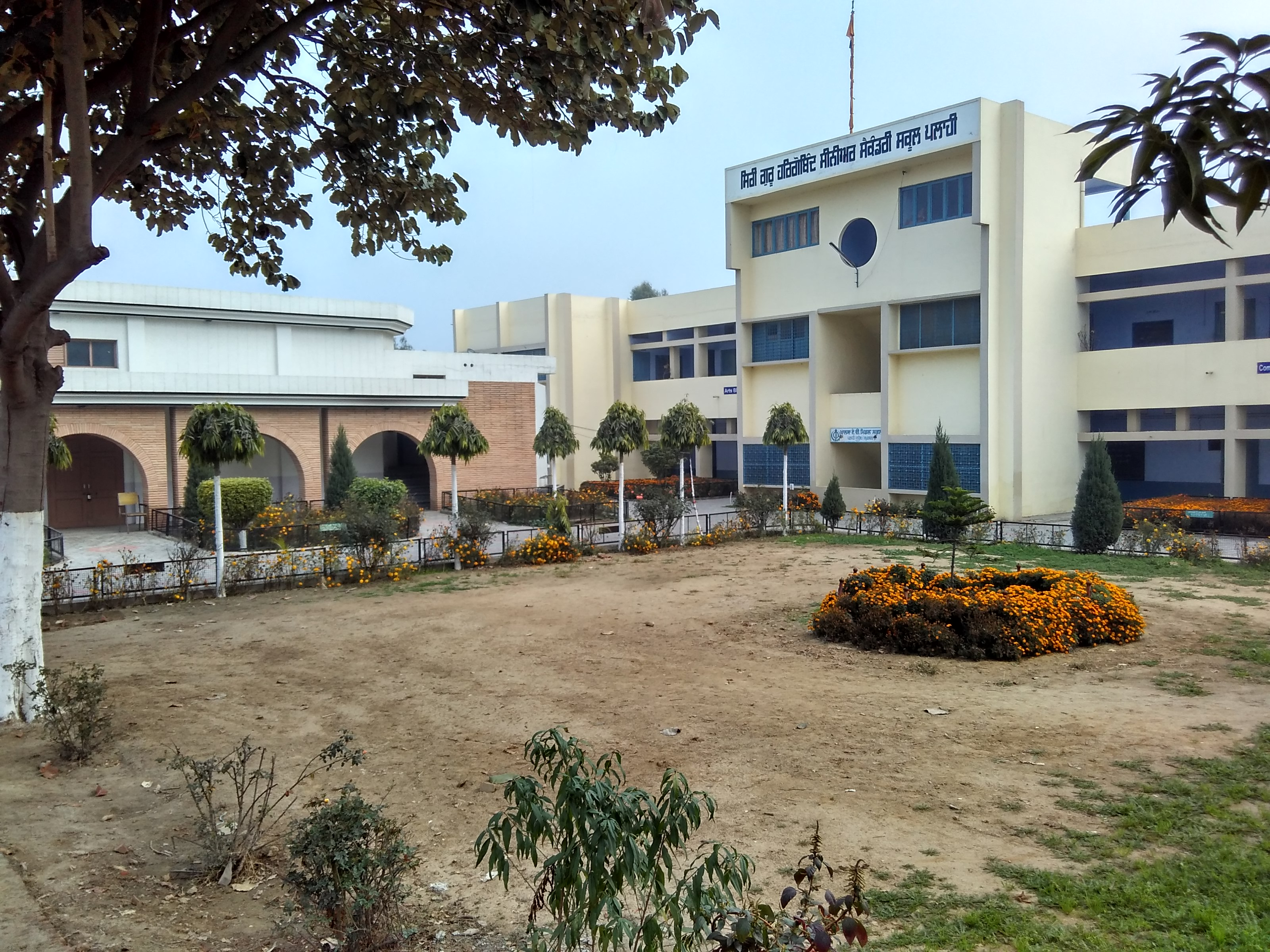
Shri Guru Hargobind Khalsa Senior Secondary School

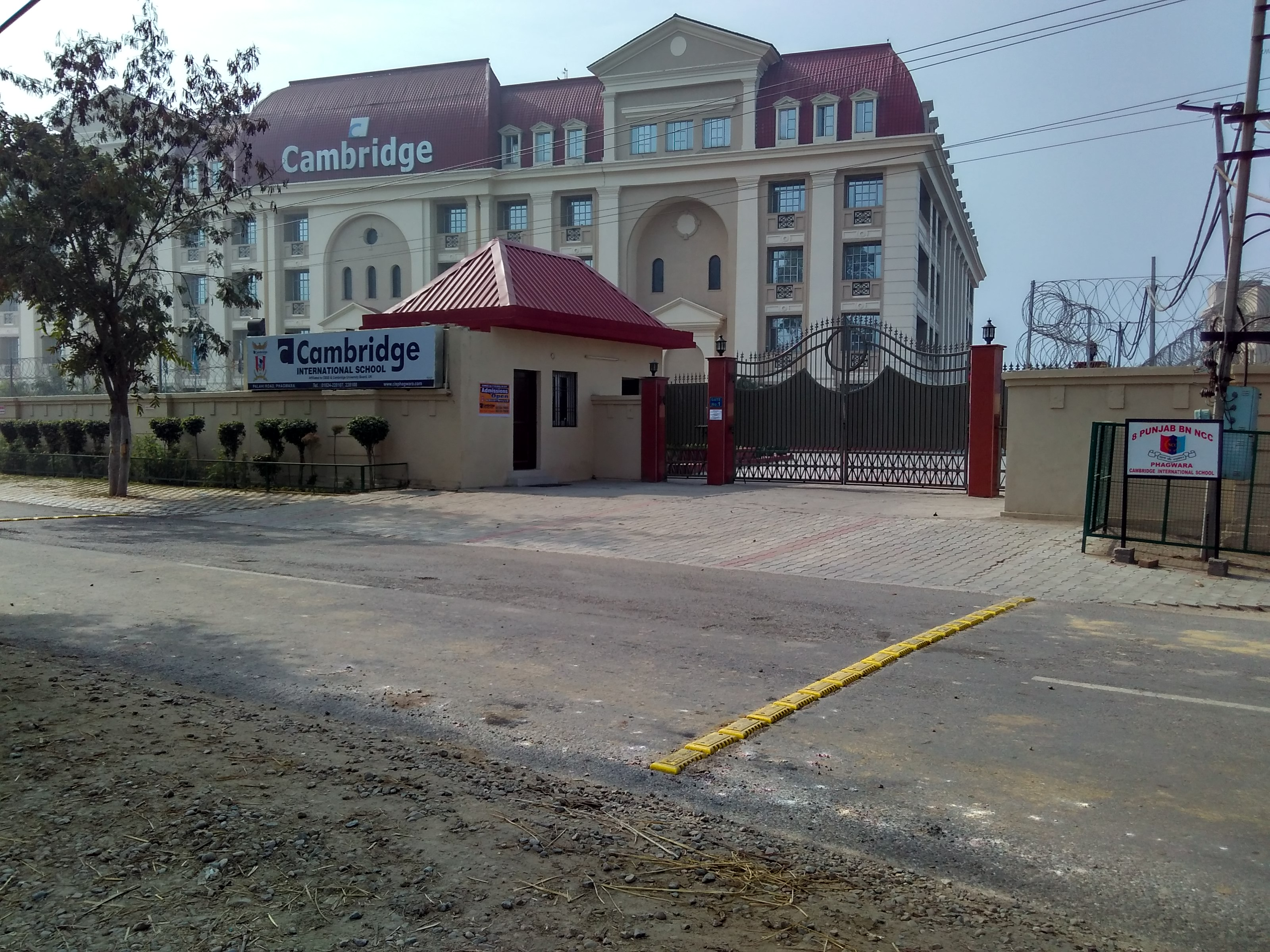
Cambridge International School

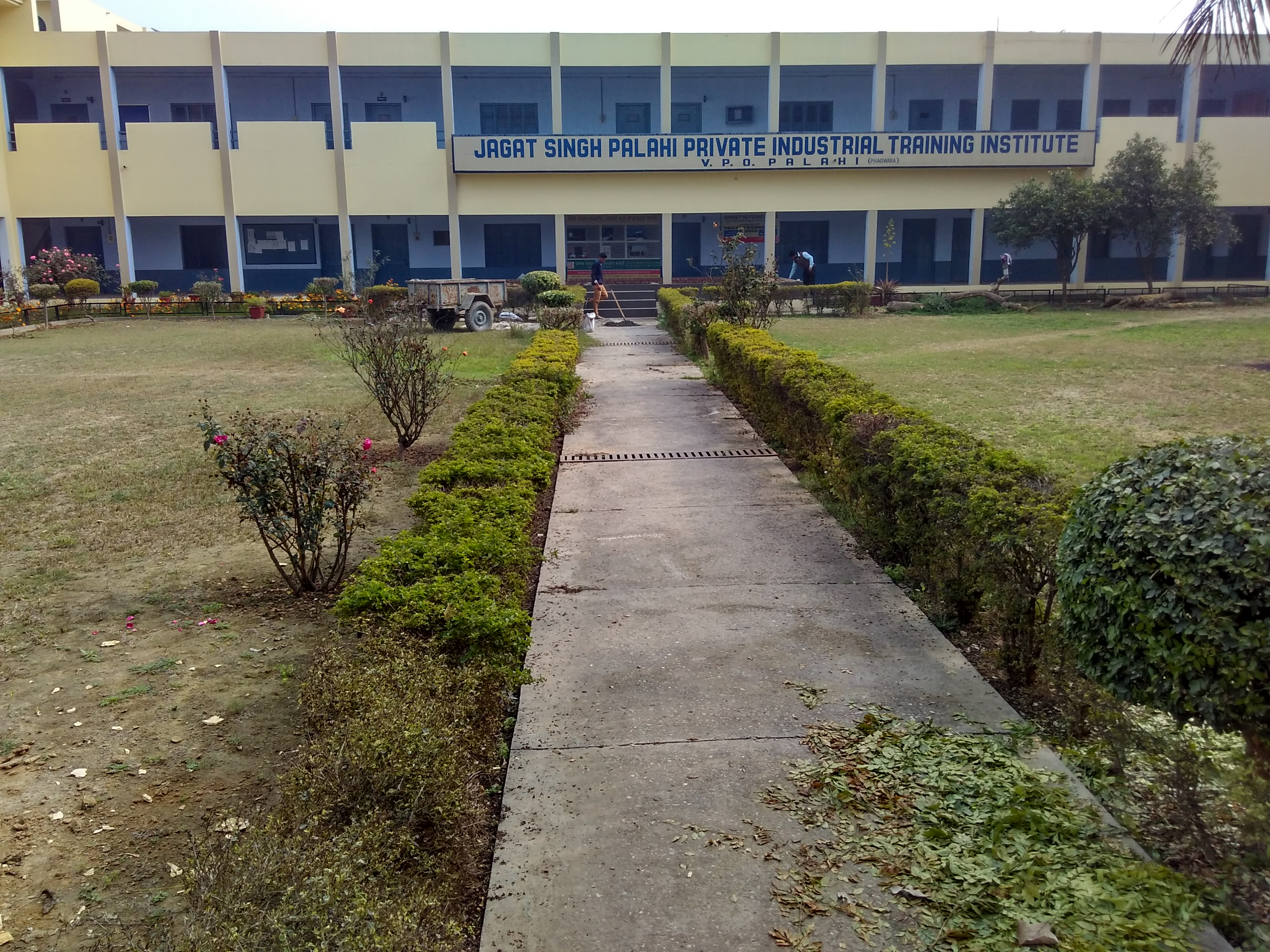
Jagat Singh Palahi Industrial Training Institute

School and Miri Piri Hall

== Financial institutions ==
Punjab National Bank, Punjab & Sind Bank, Cooperative Bank and ATM and Cooperative Society are also available for financial activity.

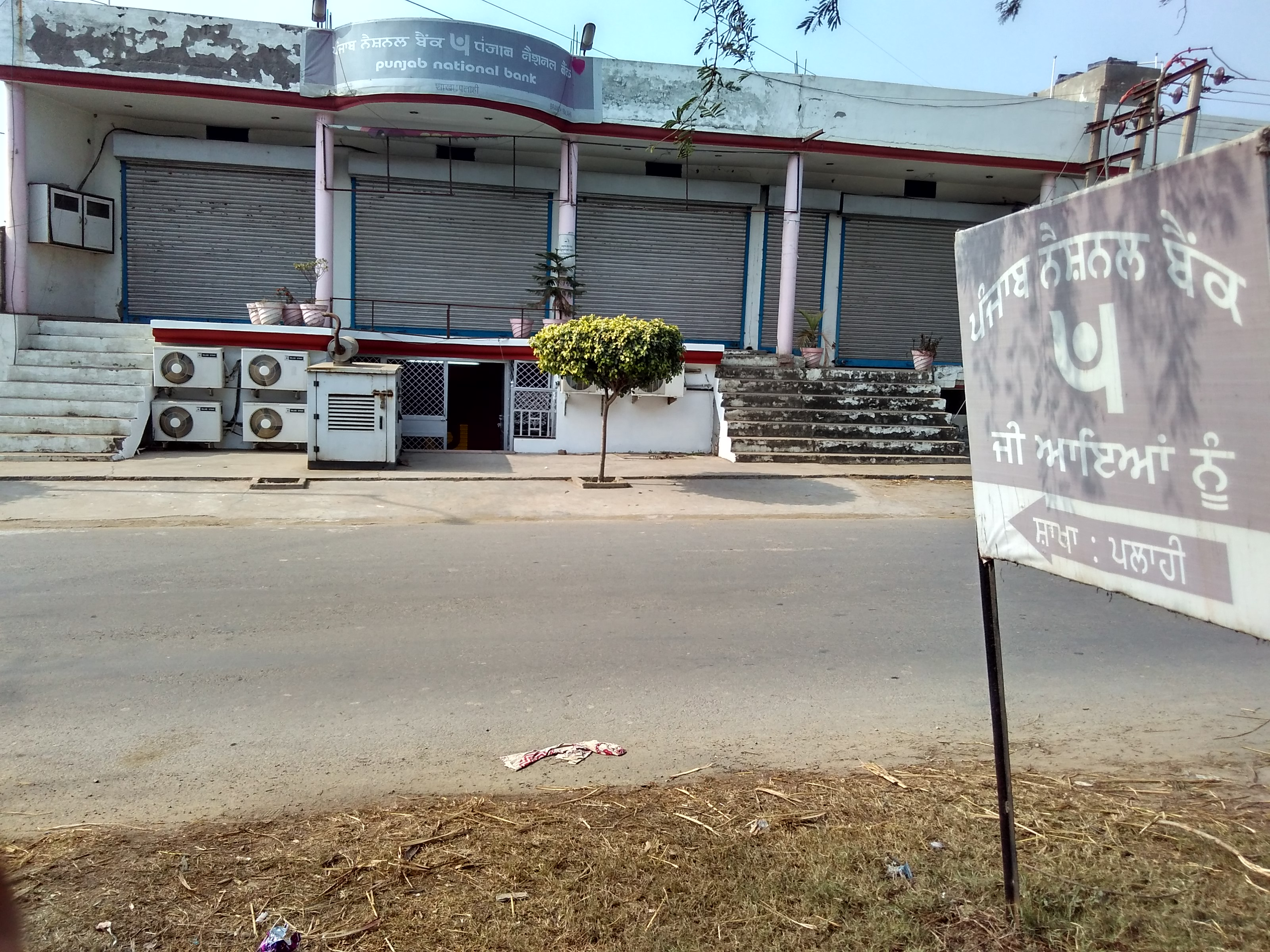
Punjab National Bank (ATM)

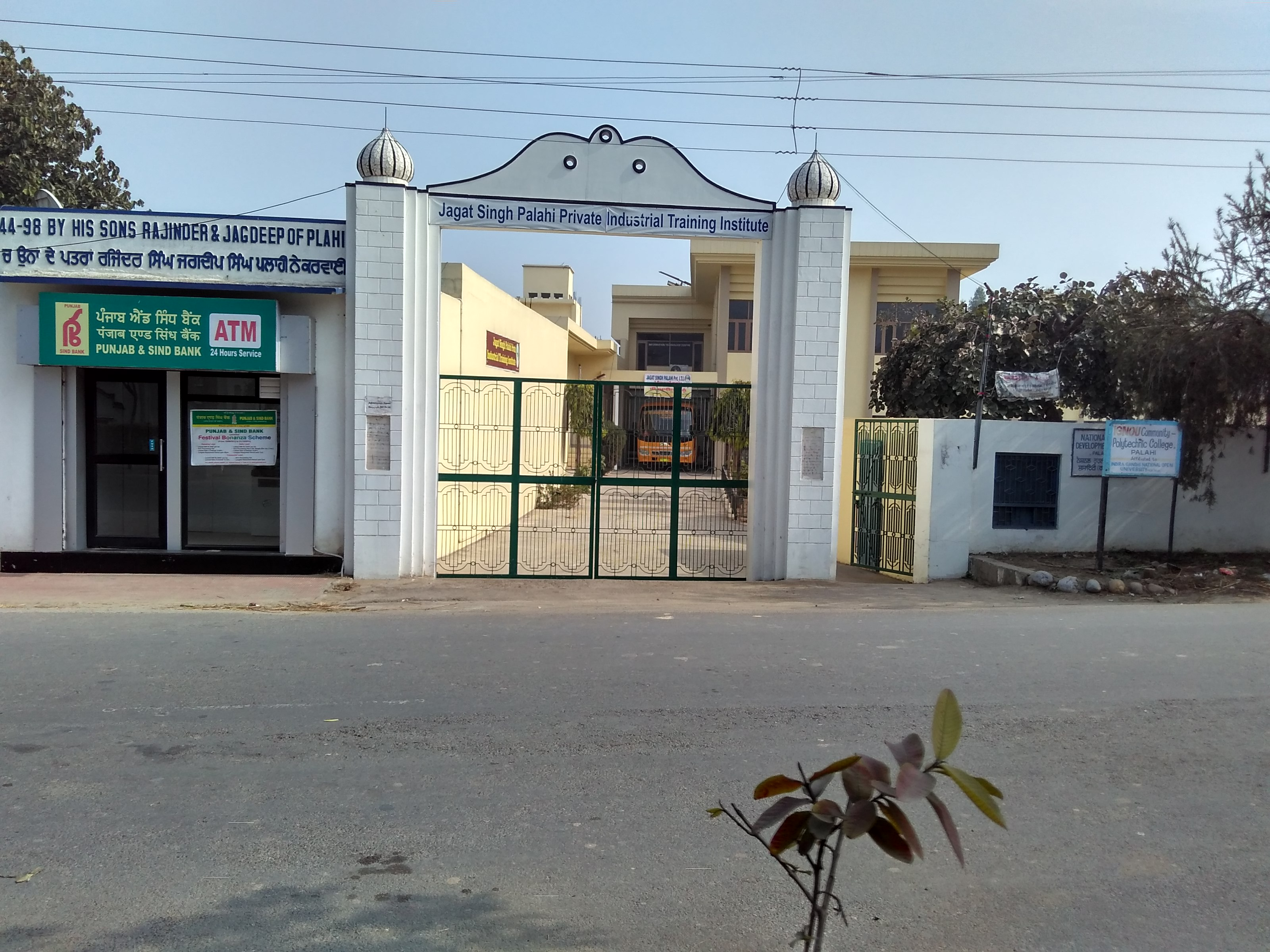
Punjab & Sind Bank (ATM)

== Health facility ==
Government Primary Health Center, Government Ayurvec Health Center, Veterinary Hospital and other Private Hospital are available for health facility.

== Playground ==
There are many playgrounds and gyms available for physical fitness.

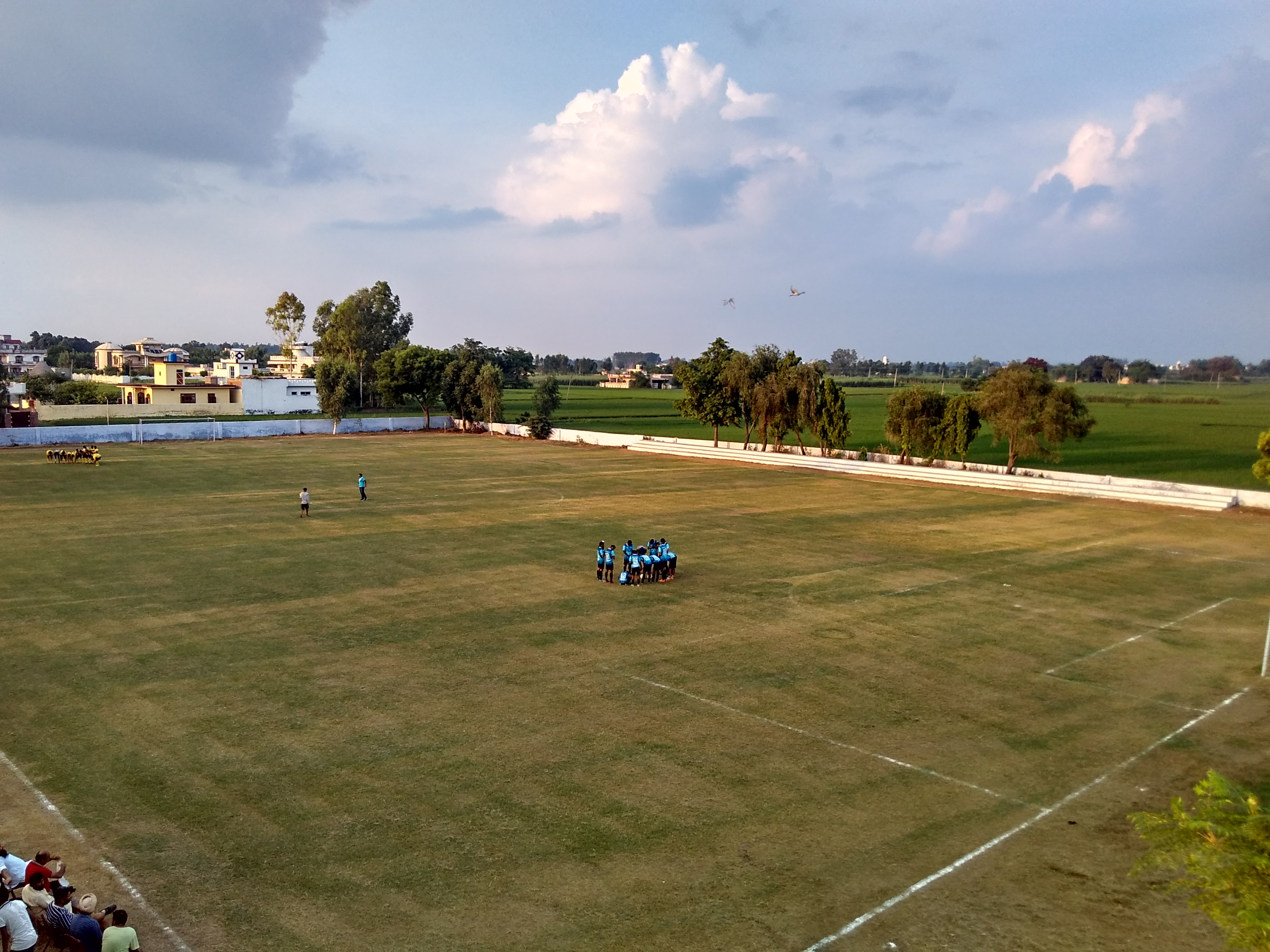
Football playground

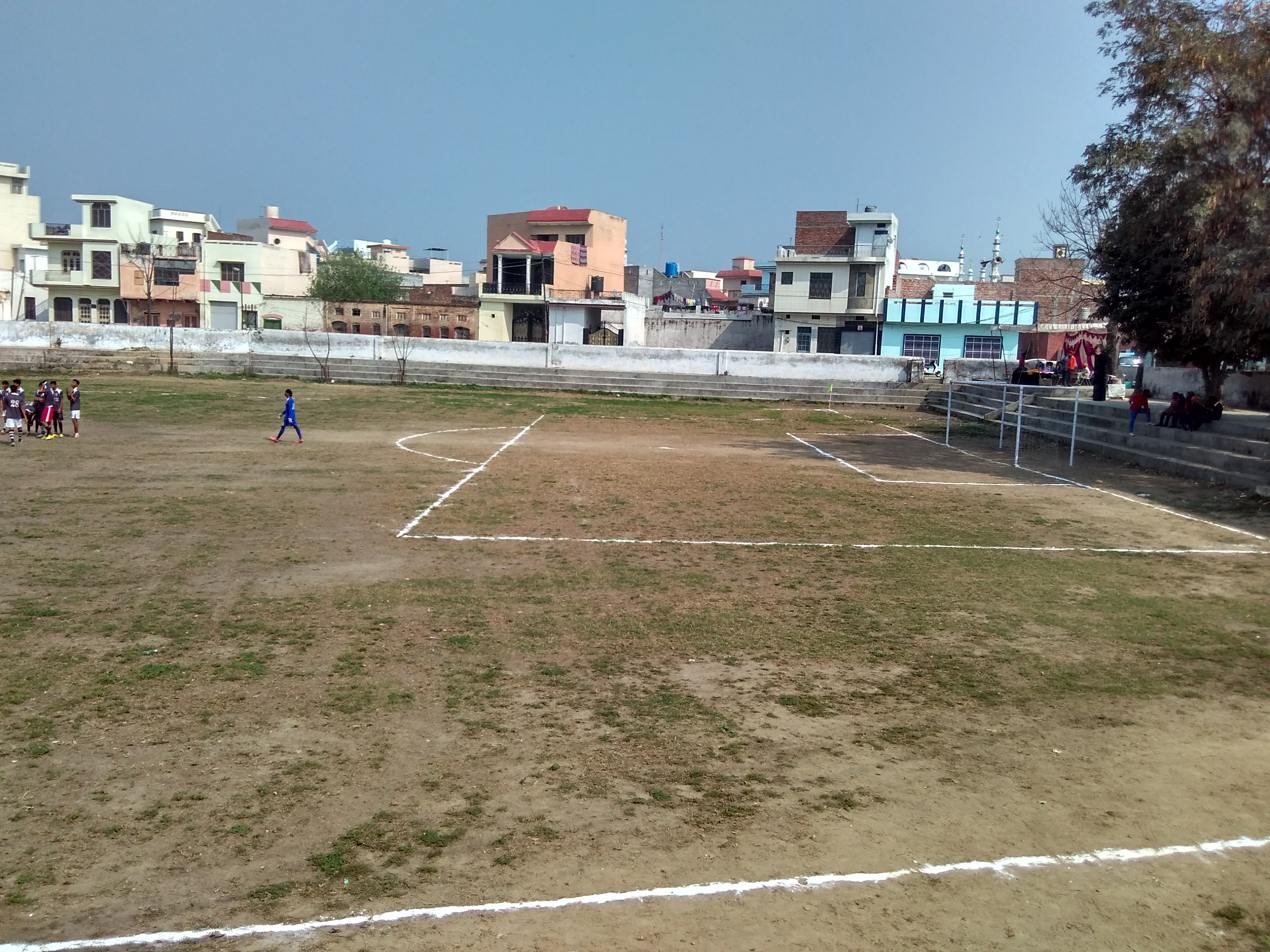
Football playground

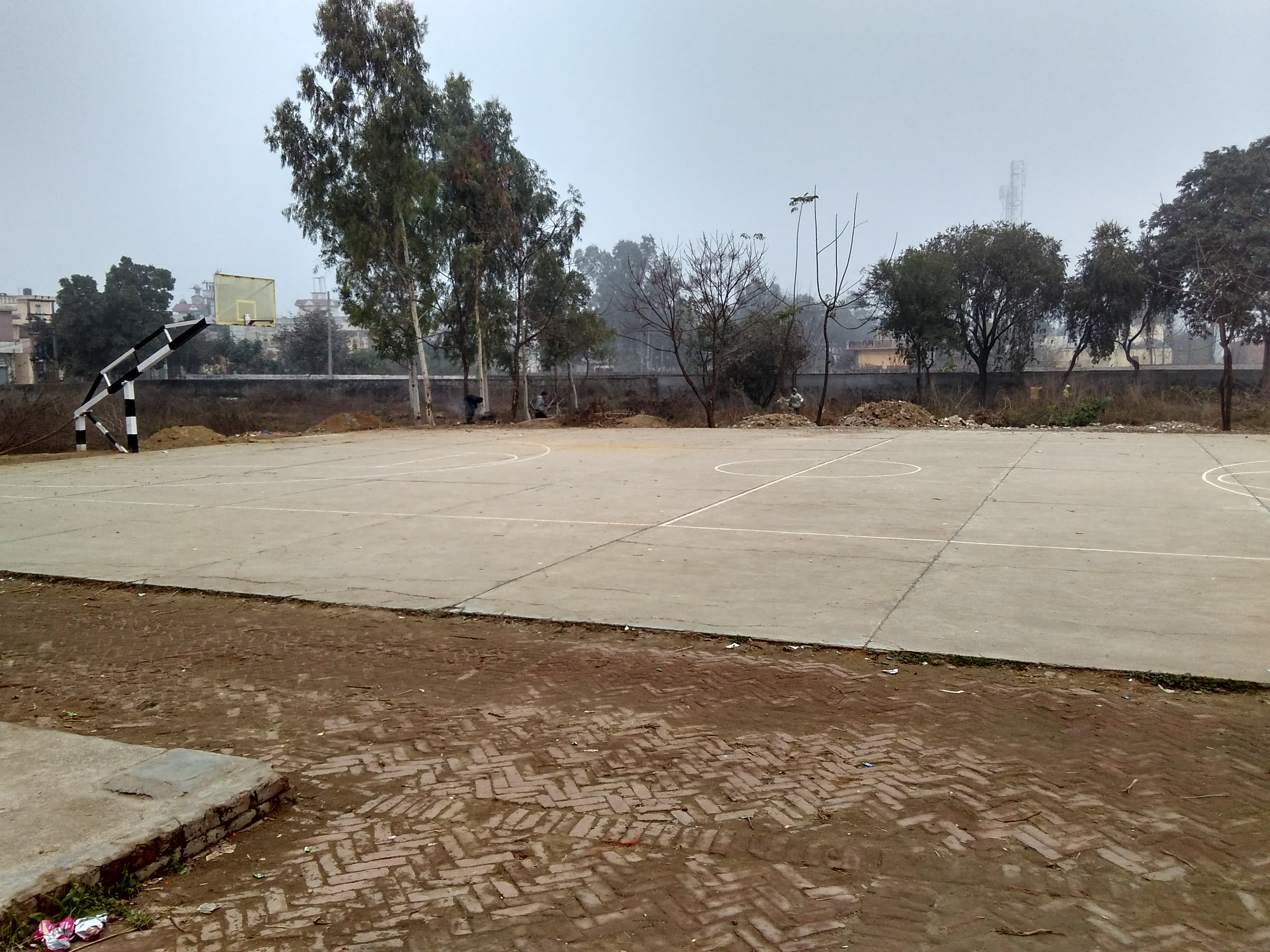
Basketball playground

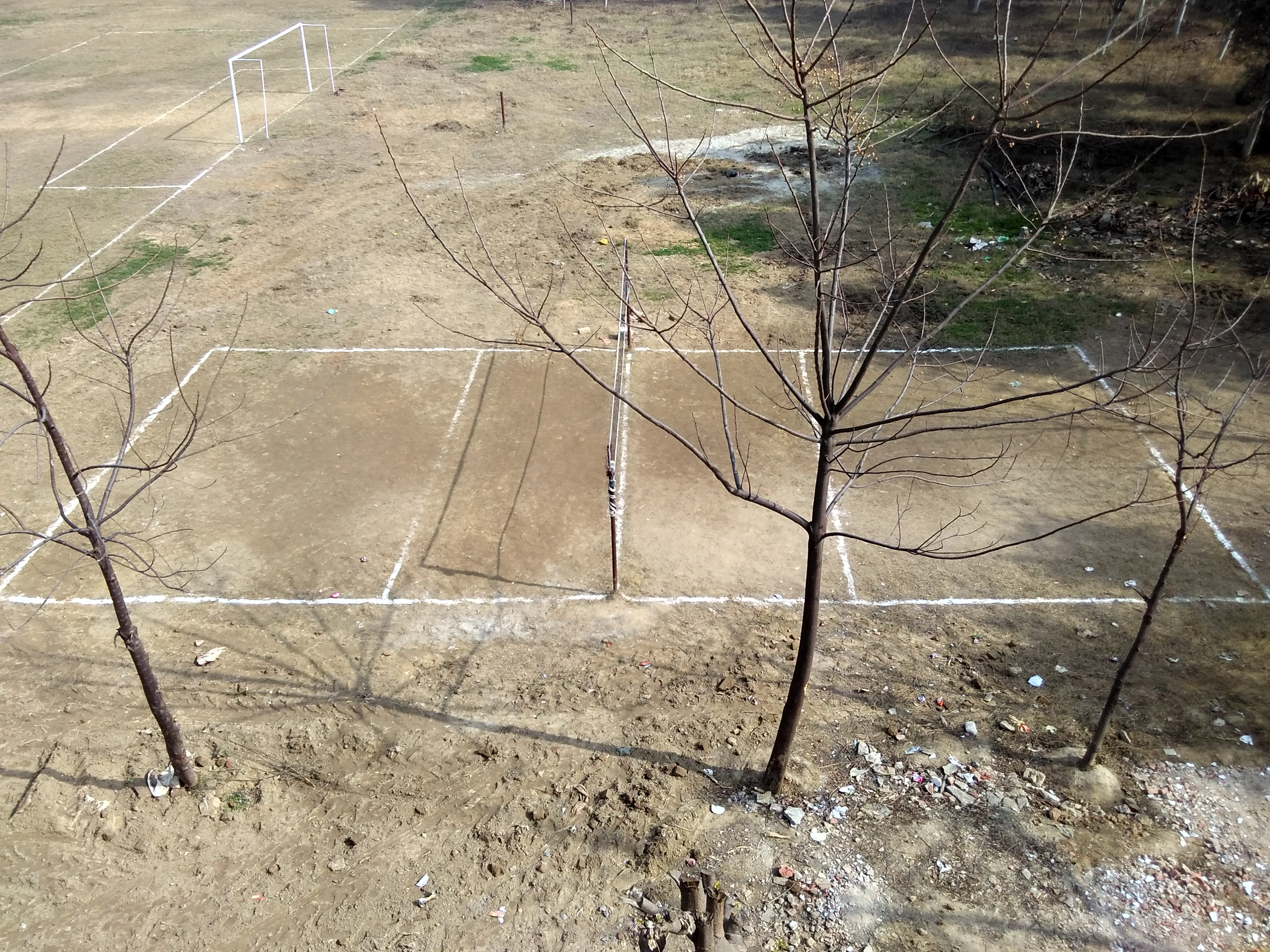
Volleyball playground

== Places ==
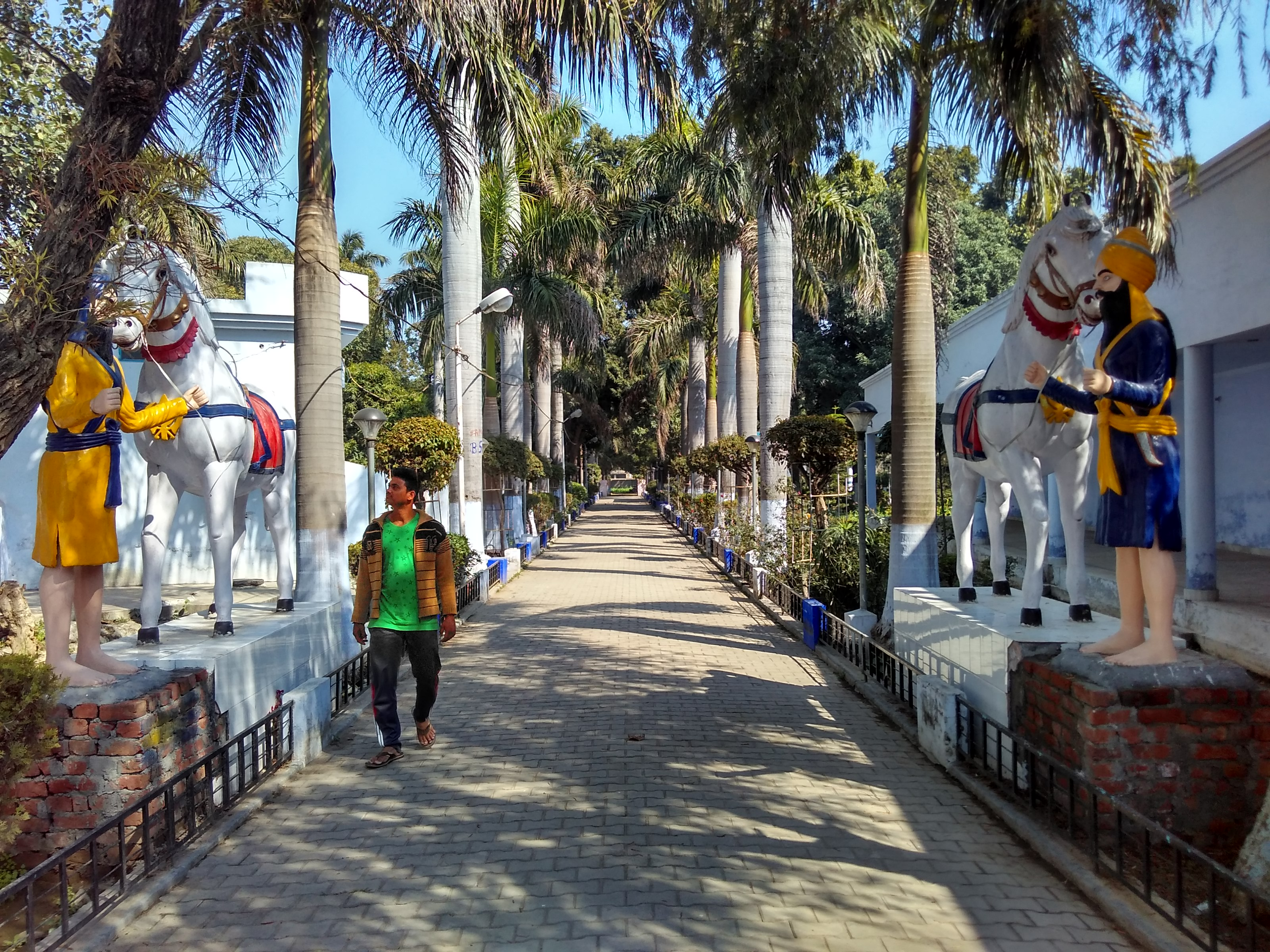
Guru Hari Rai Park

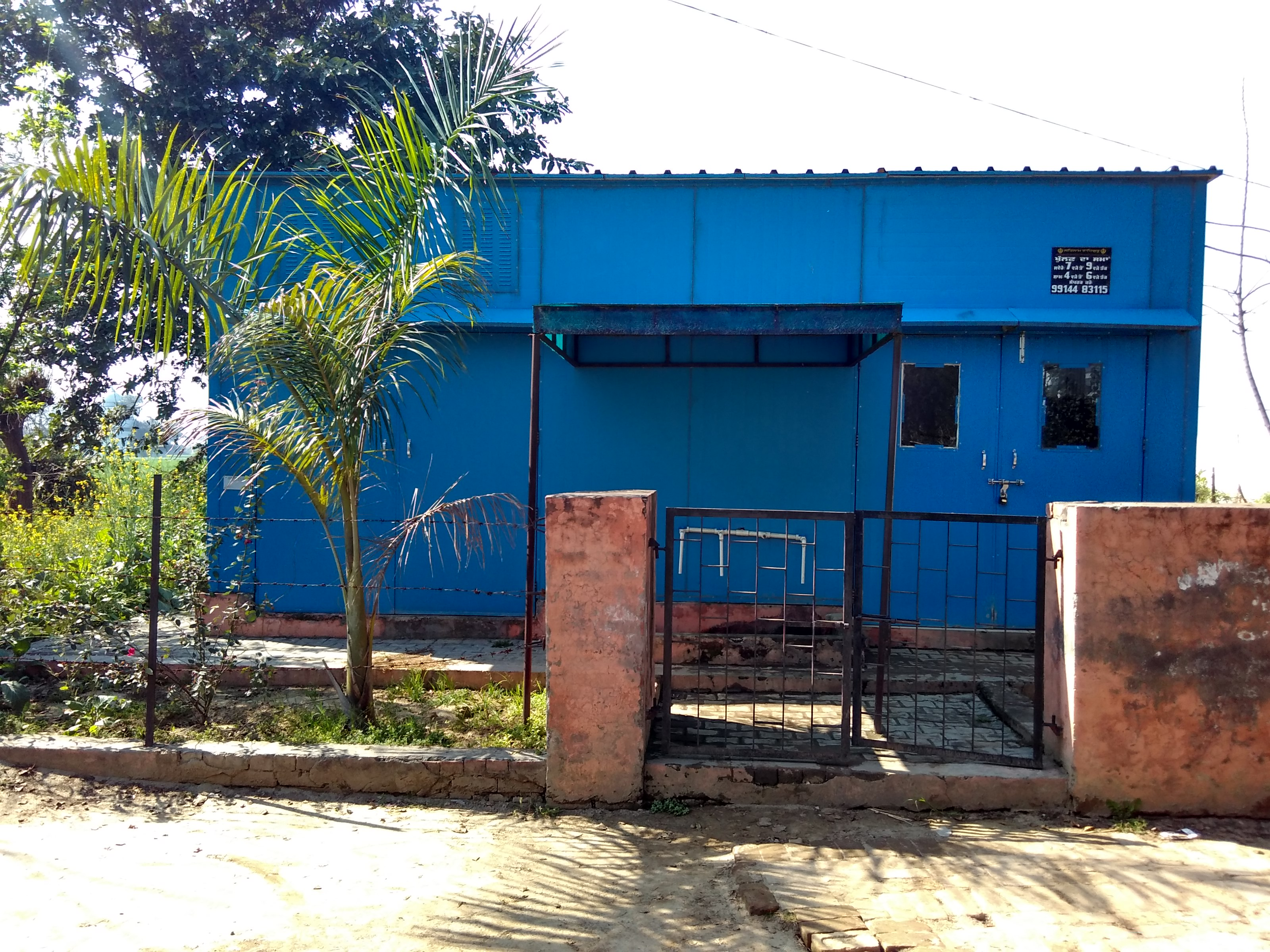
Place for Provide Filter Water

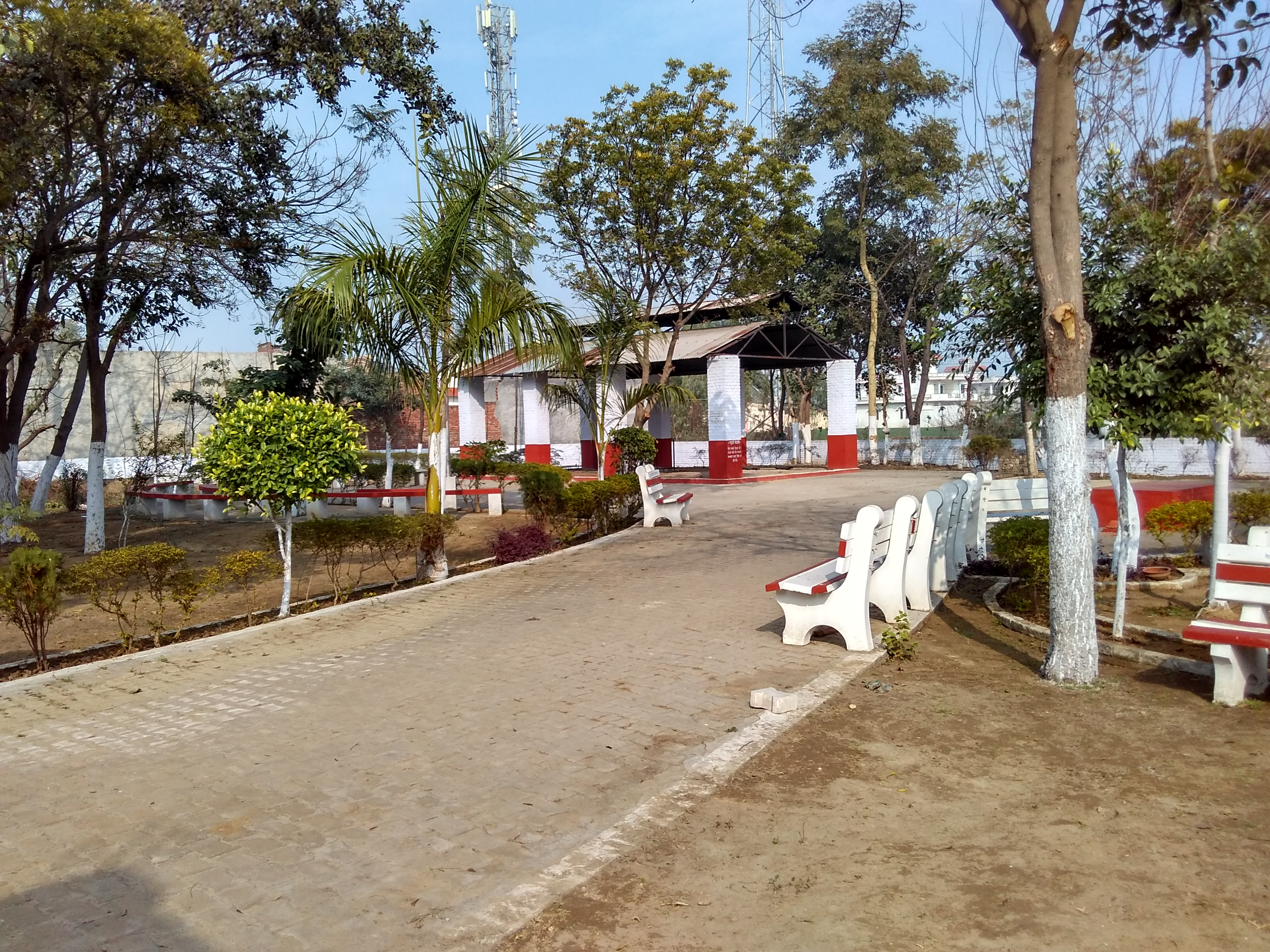
Crematorium

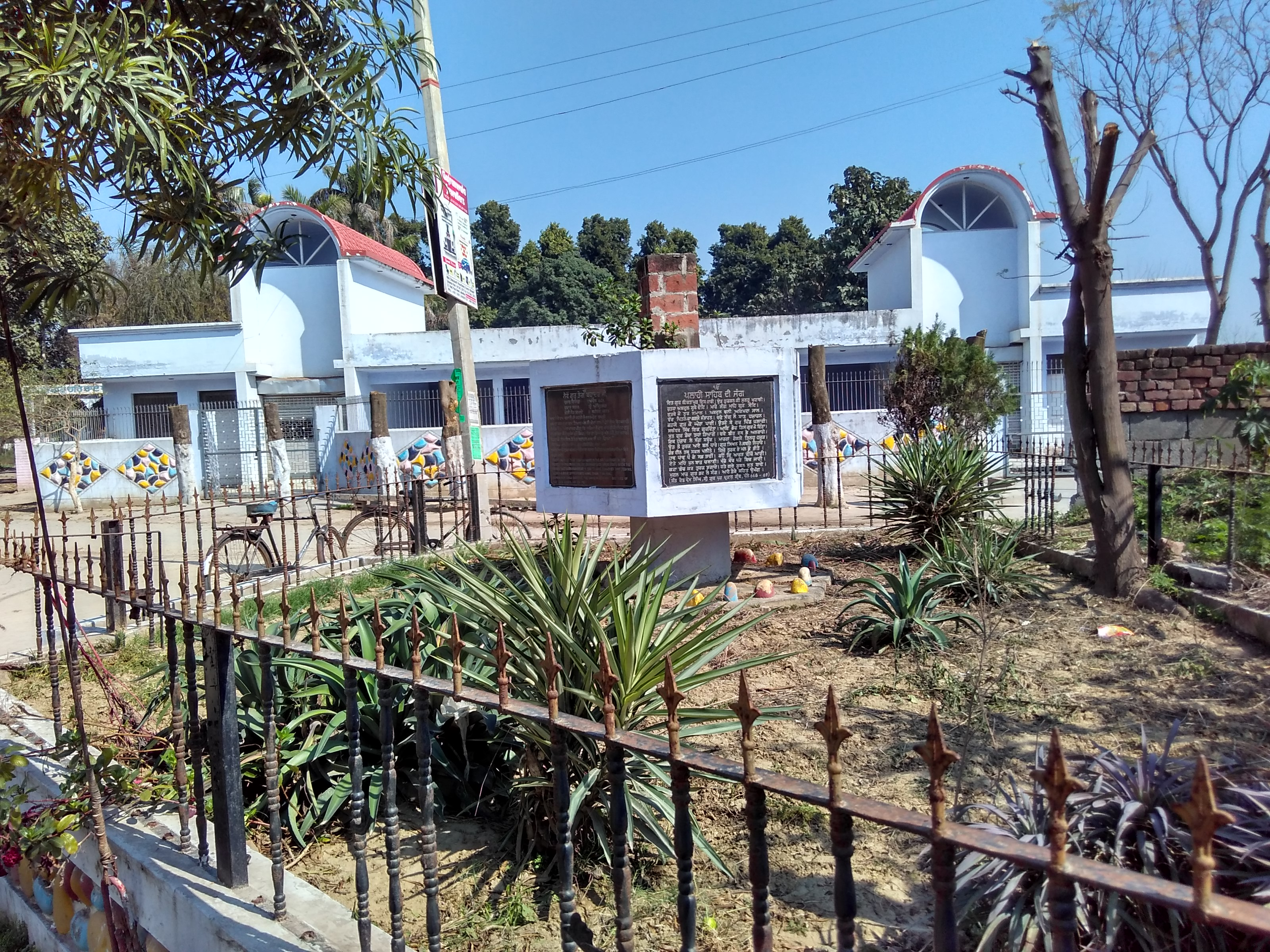
Historical Place

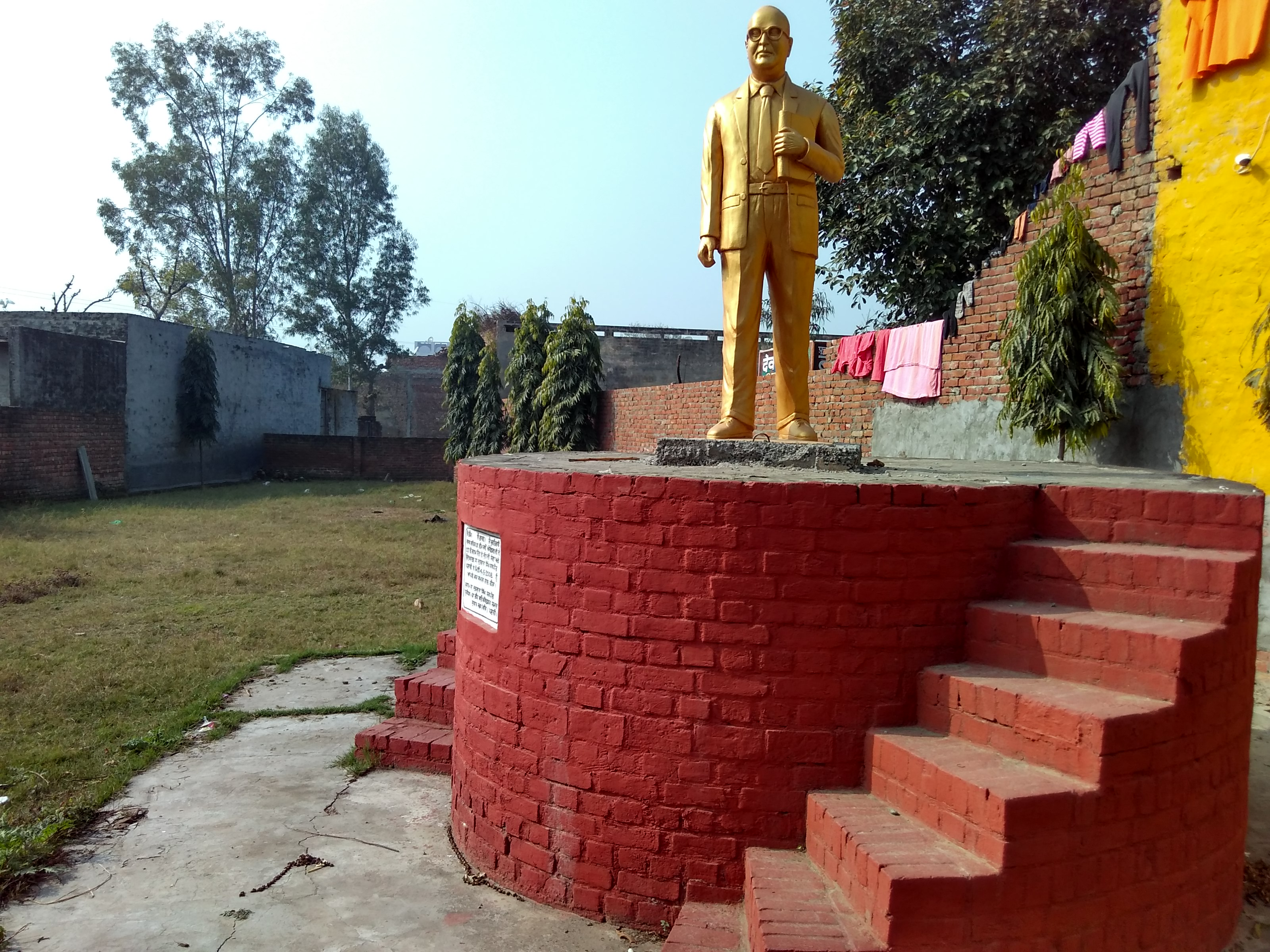
Historical Place

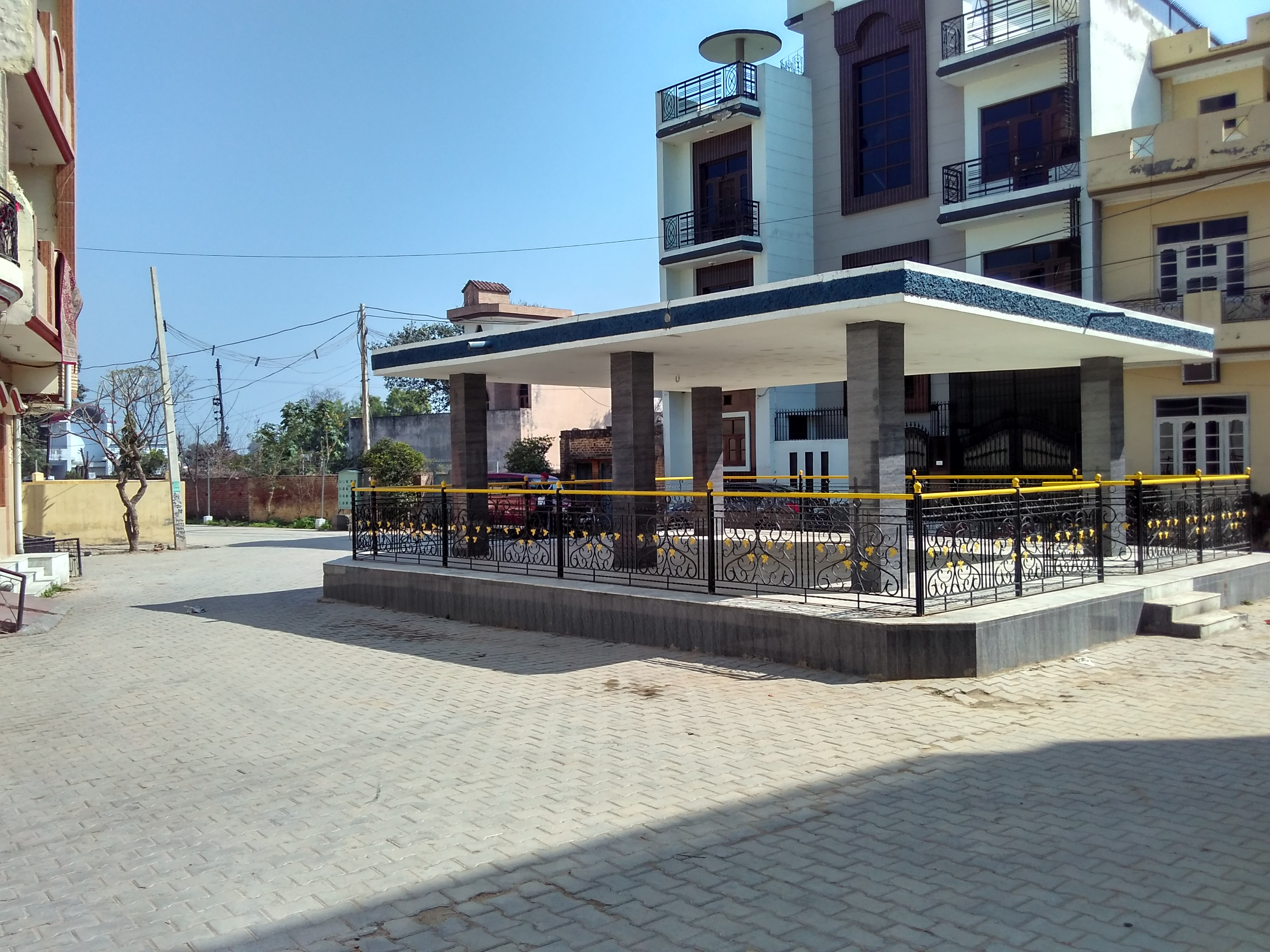
Place

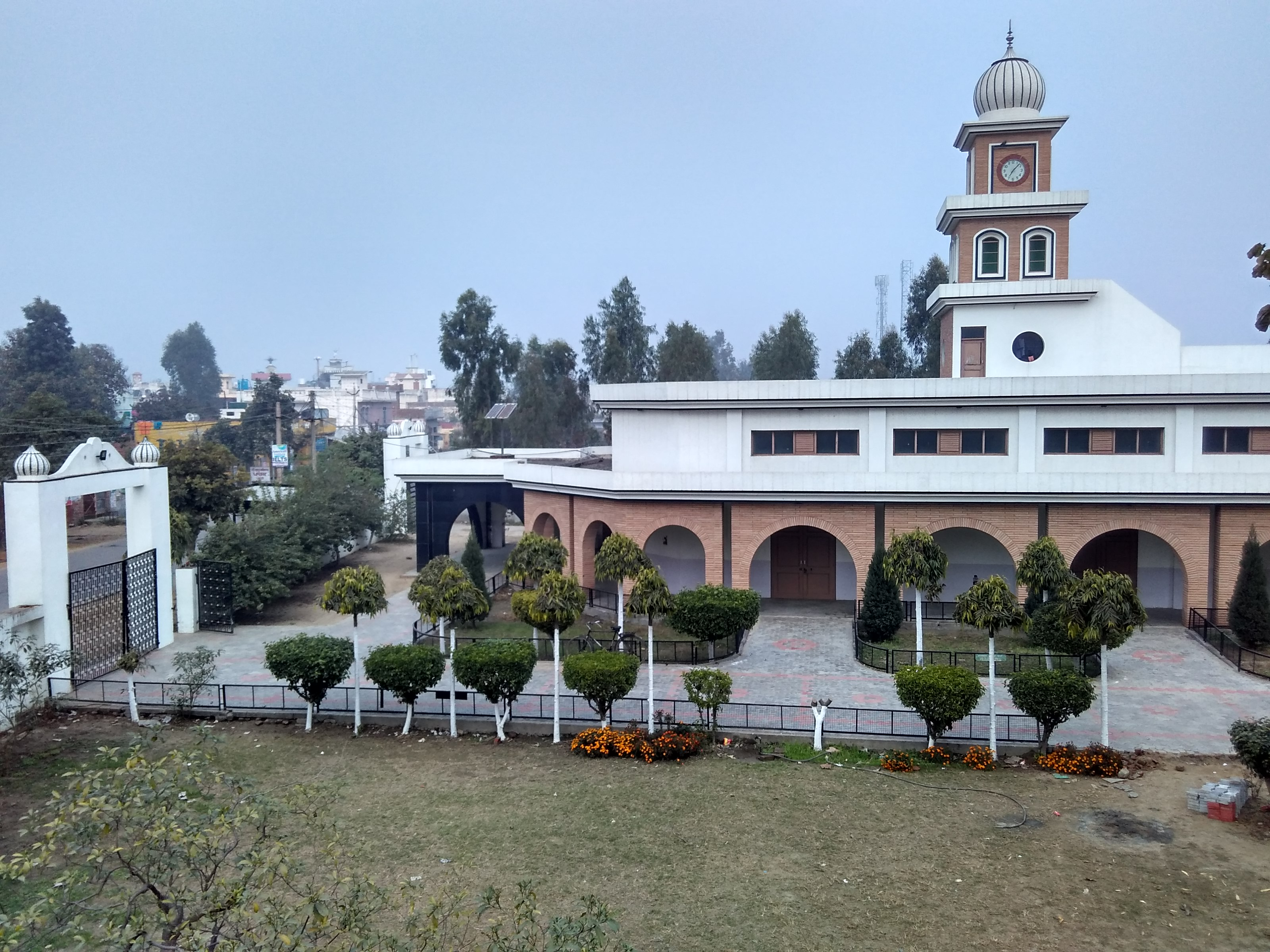
Miri Piri Hall and Clock Hall

== Location ==
The ancient village Palahi is situated at National Highway 344A (Chandigarh Road) which is 2 km from Phagwara, in north side.
