= Nangal Maja =

Coordinates: 31.259909°N 75.733518°E

Nangal Majja (or Nangal Majja) is a village in Kapurthala, Punjab, India. Nangal Majja is near the city of Phagwara. According to the 2011 census it has a population of 1015 living in 1038 households. Its main agriculture product is wheat growing.
