= List of gurdwaras =

Sikh places of worship

A Gurdwara (Punjabi: ਗੁਰਦੁਆਰਾ, gurdu'ārā or ਗੁਰਦਵਾਰਾ, gurdvārā; lit. 'the doorway to the Guru') is the Sikh place of worship and may be referred to as a Sikh temple.

== Asia ==
=== India ===
==== Assam ====
- Gurdwara Sri Guru Tegh Bahadur Sahib

==== Bihar ====
- Takht Sri Patna Sahib
- Gurdwara Guru Ka Bagh
- Gurudwara Ghai Ghat
- Gurdwara Handi Sahib
- Gurdwara Gobind Ghat
- Gurdwara Bal Lila Maini Sangat

==== Chandigarh ====
- Gurdwara Koohni Sahib

==== Delhi ====
- Gurudwara Bangla Sahib
- Gurdwara Dam Dama Sahib
- Gurdwara Sri Guru Singh Sabha
- Gurdwara Mata Sundri
- Gurdwara Nanak Piao
- Gurdwara Rakab Ganj Sahib
- Gurudwara Sis Ganj Sahib

==== Gujarat ====
- Lakhpat Gurdwara Sahib, Lakhpat

==== Haryana ====
- Gurdwara Nadha Sahib, Panchkula
- Gurdwara Toka Sahib, Toka, Naraingarh
- Gurdwara Sri Guru Tegh Bahadur Sahib, Dhamtan Sahib

==== Himachal Pradesh ====
- Chail Gurudwara. Chali
- Gurudwara Paonta Sahib, Paonta Sahib
- Manikaran Sahib, Manikaran

==== Jharkhand ====
- Gurdwara Guru Singh Sabha, Kedli Kalan

==== Karnataka ====
- Guru Nanak Jhira Sahib, Bidar

==== Maharashtra ====
- Gurudwara Khalsa Sabha, Matunga, Mumbai
- Hazur Sahib, Nanded

==== Punjab ====
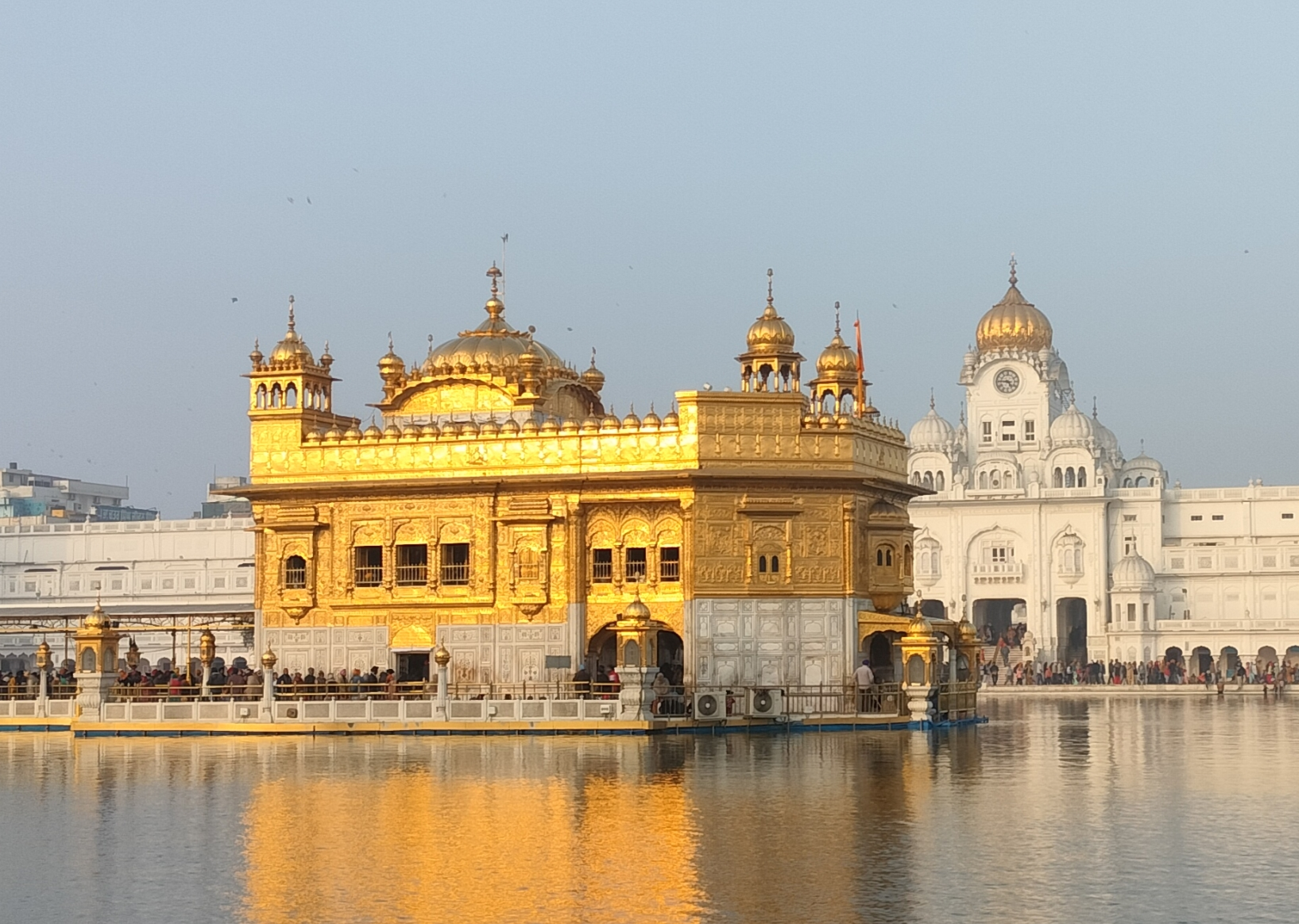
Golden temple, Amritsar

- Goindwal Sahib, Tarn Taran
- Gurdwara Baba Atal, Amritsar
- Gurdwara Baba Bakala Sahib, Baba Bakala
- Gurudwara Baba Gurditta, Chandpur Rurki
- Gurdwara Dukh Nivaran Sahib, Patiala
- Gurdwara Fatehgarh Sahib, Fatehgarh Sahib
- Gurdwara Shaheed Ganj Sahib, Amritsar
- Gurdwara Guptsar Sahib, Chhattiana
- Gurdwara Jyoti Sarup, Fatehgarh Sahib
- Gurdwara Karamsar Rara Sahib, Rara Sahib
- Gurdwara Likhansar Sahib, Talwandi Sabo
- Gurdwara Mata Sunder Kaur, Mohali
- Gurudwara Nagiana Sahib, Udoke, Batala
- Gurudwara Naulakha Sahib, Naulakha
- Gurdwara Parivar Vichhora, Majri, Rupnagar district
- Gurdwara Patal Puri Sahib, Kiratpur Sahib
- Gurdwara Sahib Patshahi Chhevi, Khurana
- Gurdwara Sri Tarn Taran Sahib, Tarn Taran
- Gurusar Sahib, Lal Kalan, Ludhiana district
- Harmandir Sahib, Amritsar
- Manji Sahib, Alamgir, Ludhiana district
- Mehdiana Sahib, Mehdiana, Ludhiana district
- Sri Akal Takht Sahib, Amritsar
- Takht Sri Damdama Sahib, Talwandi Sabo
- Takht Kesgarh Sahib, Anandpur Sahib
- Gurdwara Sri Ber Sahib, Sultanpur Lodhi
- Gurdwara Qila Anandgarh Sahib, Anandpur Sahib

==== Rajasthan ====
- Gurudwara Buddha Johad, Sri Ganganagar district

==== Sikkim ====
- Gurdwara Nanaklama, Chungthang

==== Uttarakhand ====
- Gurudwara Shri Hemkund Sahib, Chamoli district
- Gurudwara Sri Gobind Ghat, Govindghat
- Gurudwara Nanakmatta Sahib, Nanakmatta
- Gurudwara Reetha Sahib, Champawat district

==== Ladakh ====
- Gurudwara Patthar Sahib

==== Uttar Pradesh ====
- Guru ka Tal, Agra

=== Pakistan ===
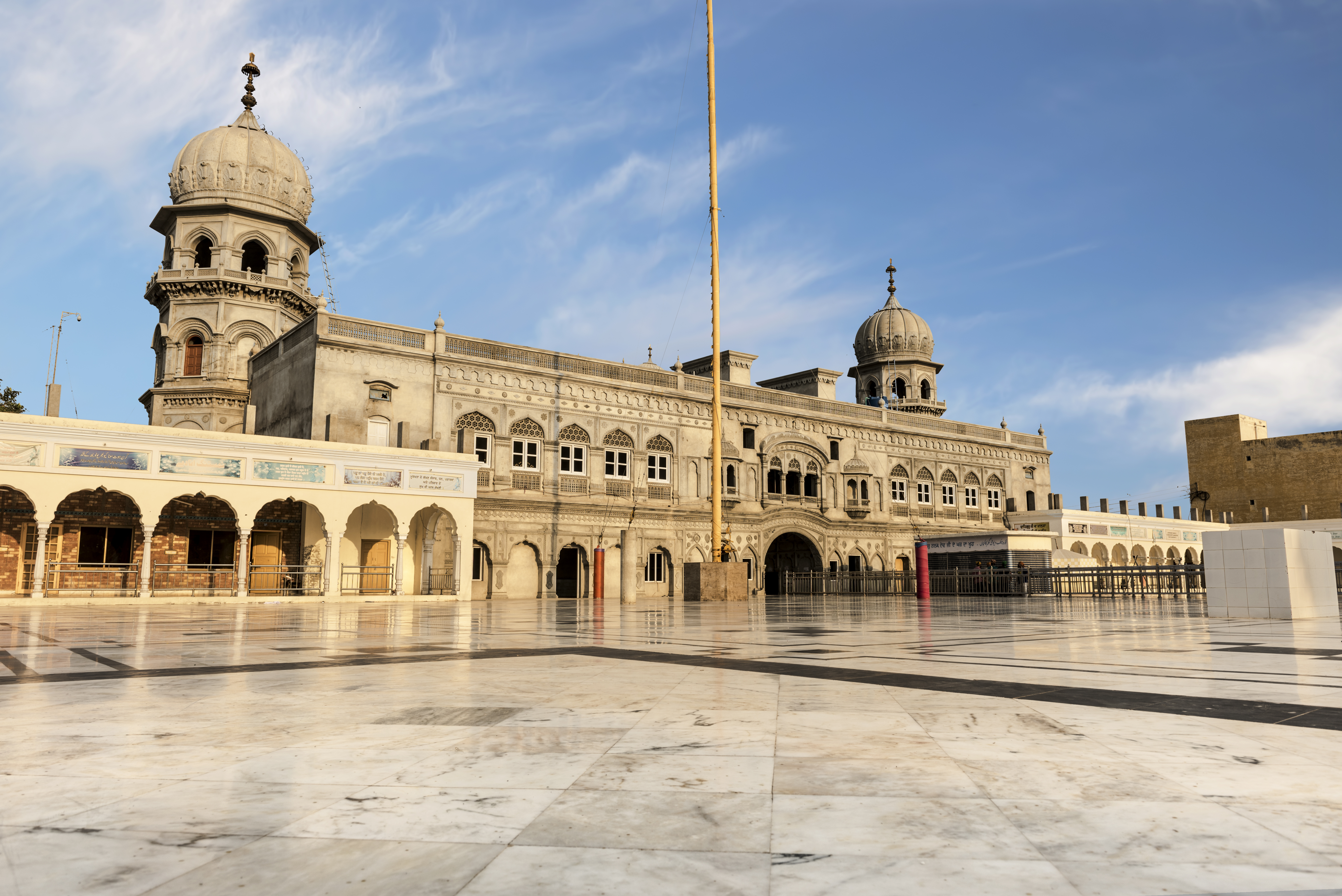
Gurdwara Janam Asthan, Pakistan, the birthplace of the founder of Sikhism

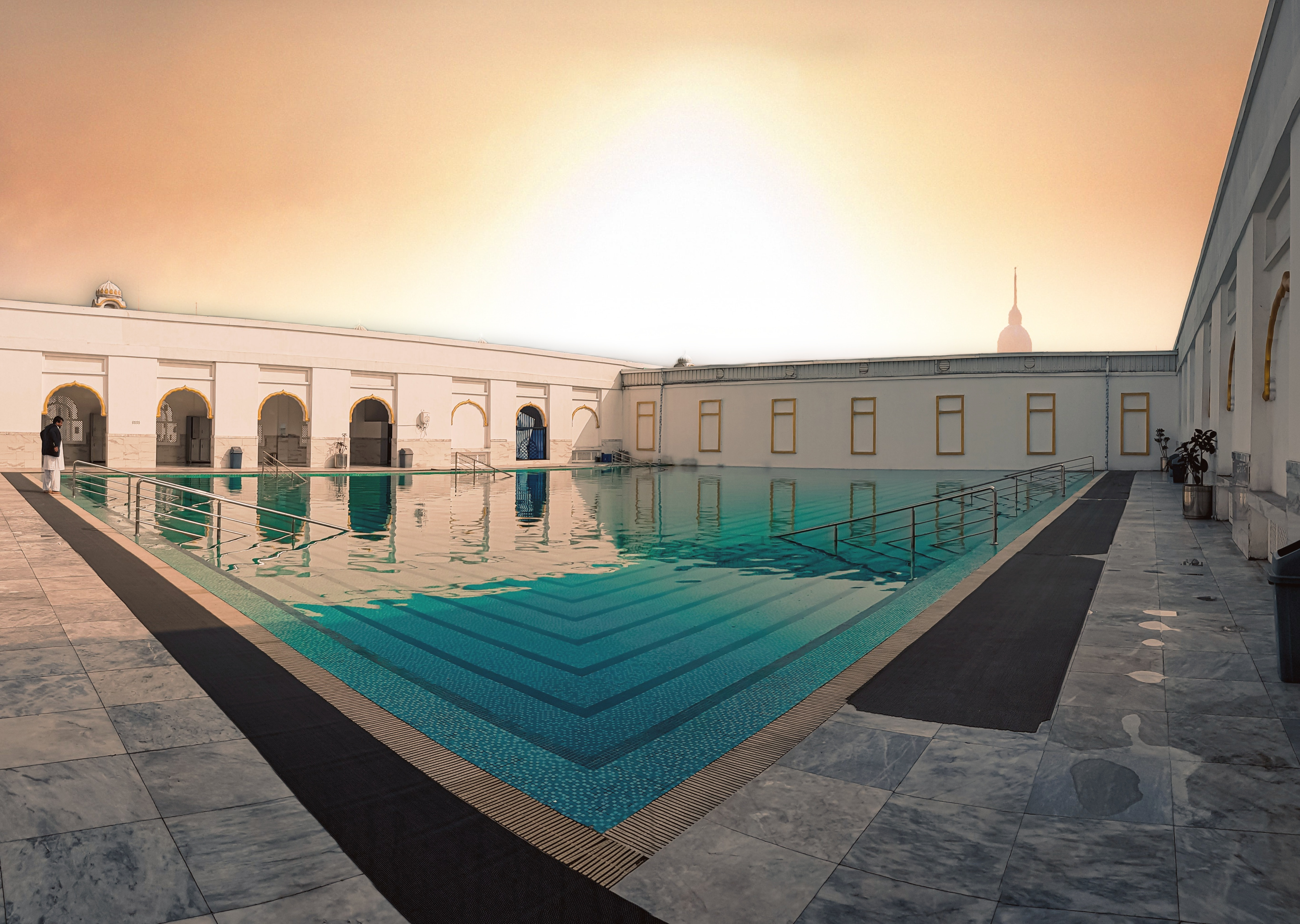
Pool in Gurdwara Nankana Sahib in Nankana Sahib, Pakistan, the burial place of the founder of Sikhism

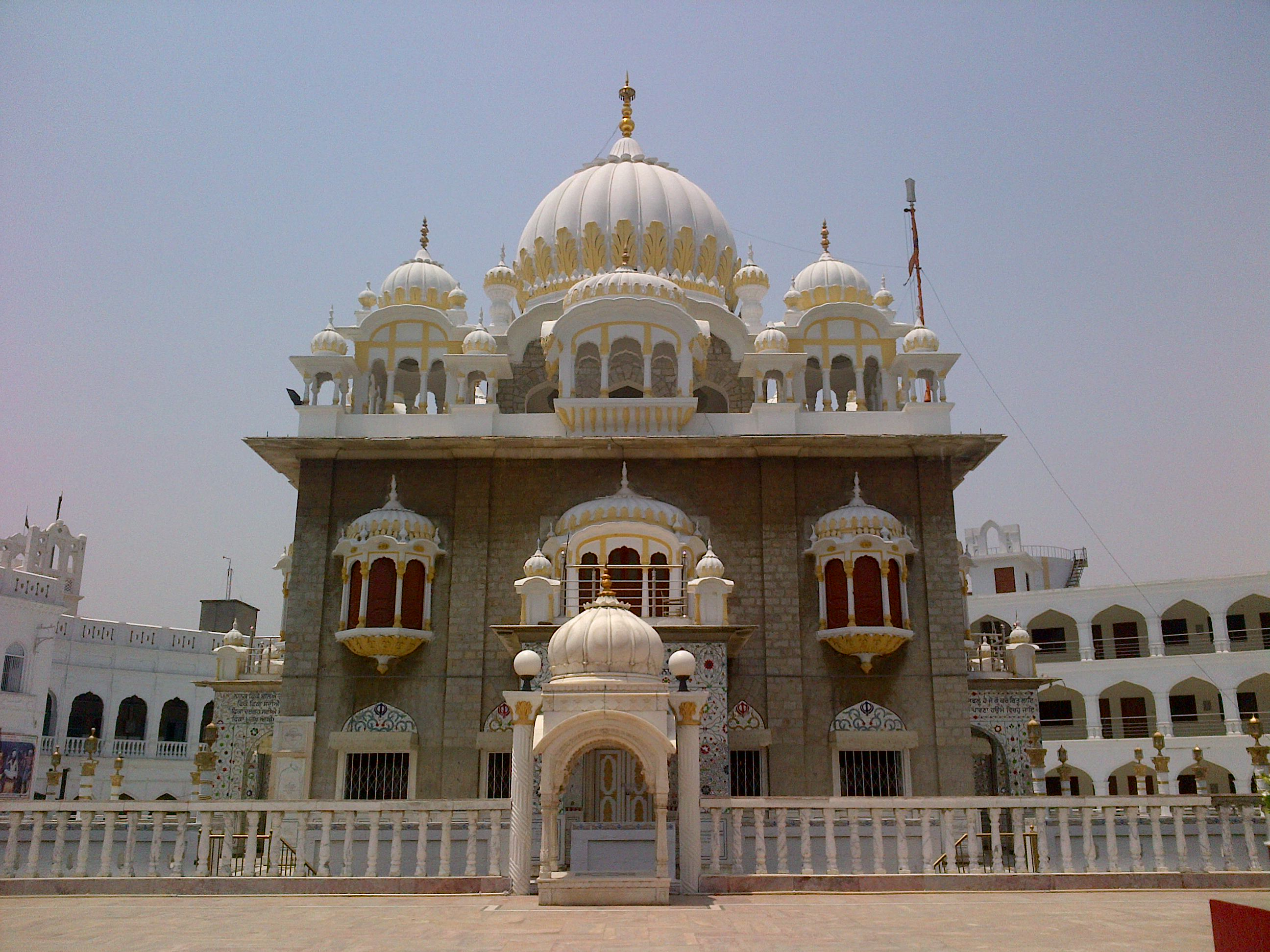
Gurdwara Panja Sahib at Hasan Abdal, Punjab, Pakistan

==== Punjab ====
- Gurdwara Beri Sahib, Sialkot
- Gurdwara Darbar Sahib Kartarpur, Kartarpur
- Gurdwara Dera Sahib, Lahore
- Samadhi of Ranjit Singh, Lahore
- Gurdwara Janam Asthan Guru Ram Das, Lahore
- Gurdwara Janam Asthan, Nankana Sahib
- Gurdwara Chowa Sahib, Jhelum
- Gurdwara Panja Sahib, Hasan Abdal
- Gurdwara Makhdoom Pur Pahoran, Makhdoom Pur Pahuran
- Gurdwara Rori Sahib, Eminabad
- Shahid Ganj Bhai Taru Singh, Lahore
- Gurdwara Shahid Ganj Sighnian, Lahore

=== Other locations in Asia ===
==== Afghanistan ====
- Gurdwara Karte Parwan, Kabul

==== Azerbaijan ====
- Ateshgah of Baku, Baku

==== Bangladesh ====
- Gurdwara Nanak Shahi, Dhaka

==== Hong Kong ====
- Khalsa Diwan Sikh Temple

==== Indonesia ====
Sikh Temple Pasar Baru

- Sikh Temple Pasar Baru

==== Iran ====
- Masjid-e-Hindan, Tehran

==== Johor ====
- Gurdwara Sahib Pontian
- Gurdwara Sahib Johor Bahru
- Gurdwara Sahib Kluang
- Gurdwara Sahib Muar
- Gurdwara Sahib Segamat
- Gurdwara Sahib Babe Ke Guru Ram Das
- Gurdwara Sahib Batu Pahat

==== Kuala Lumpur ====
- Gurdwara Sahib Dharamsala
- Gurdwara Sahib Sentul
- Gurdwara Sahib Sikh Temple Shapan
- Sikh Temple Polis Jalan Parlimen
- Sikh Temple Jinjang
- Gurdwara Sahib Kuyow
- Gurdwara Sahib Mainduab
- Gurdwara Sahib Tatt Khalsa Diwan
- Gurdwara Sahib Police High Street
- Sikh Temple Pulapol
- Gurdwara Sahib Titiwangsa
- Wadda Gurdwara Sahib Kampung Pandan
- Gurdwara Sahib Kg Pandan Settlement

==== Selangor ====
- Gurdwara Sahib Ampang
- Gurdwara Sahib Khalsa Land
- Gurdwara Sahib Berjuntai Tin
- Gurdwara Sahib Bukit Beruntung
- Gurdwara Sahib Kajang
- Gurdwara Sahib Kalumpang
- Gurdwara Sahib Klang
- Gurdwara Sahib Kuala Kubu Baru
- Gurdwara Sahib Lembah Jaya
- Gurdwara Sahib Petaling Jaya
- Gurdwara Sahib Petaling Tin
- Gurdwara Sahib Port Klang
- Gurdwara Sahib Puchong
- Gurdwara Sahib Rasa
- Gurdwara Sahib Rawang
- Gurdwara Sahib Selayang Baru
- Gurdwara Sahib Serdang
- Gurdwara Sahib Serendah
- Gurdwara Sahib Shah Alam
- Gurdwara Sahib Ulu Yam
- Gurdwara Sahib Bandar Sunway
- Gurdwara Sahib Putra Heights
- Gurdwara Sahib Subang
- Gurdwara Sahib Setia City
- Darbar Sri Guru Granth Sahib Ji
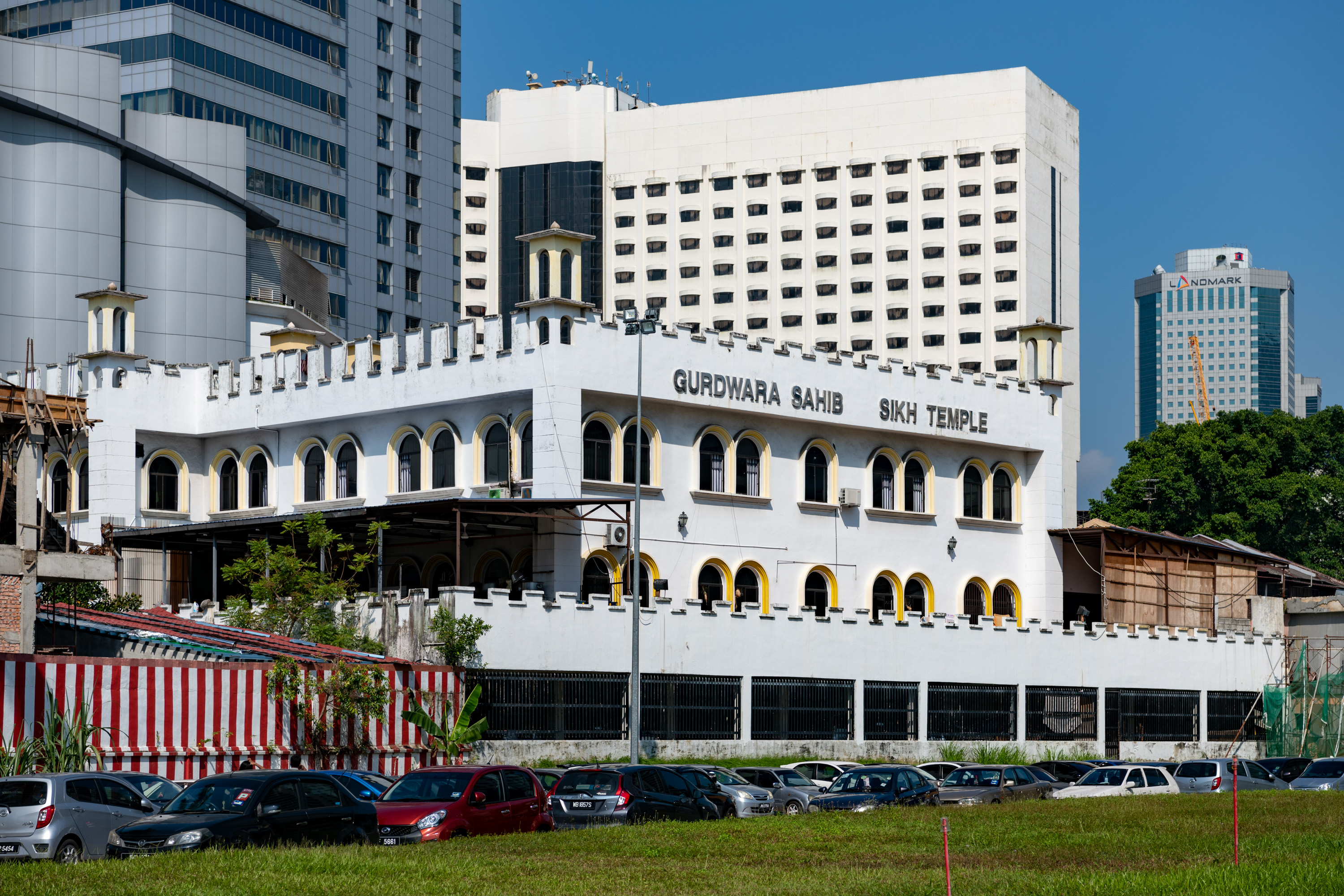
Gurdwara Sahib Sikh Temple, Johor Bahru, Malaysia

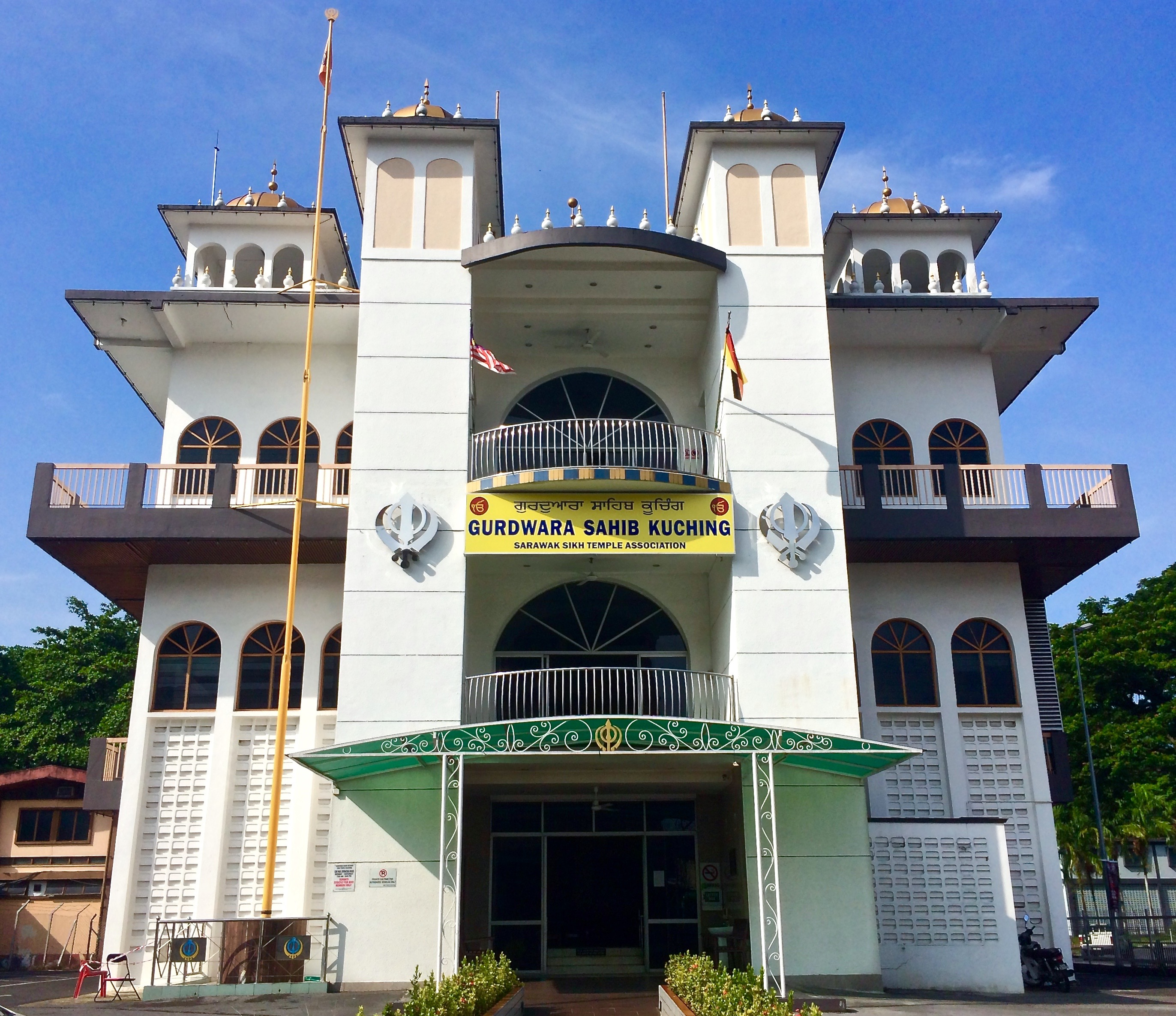
Gurdwara Sahib Kuching

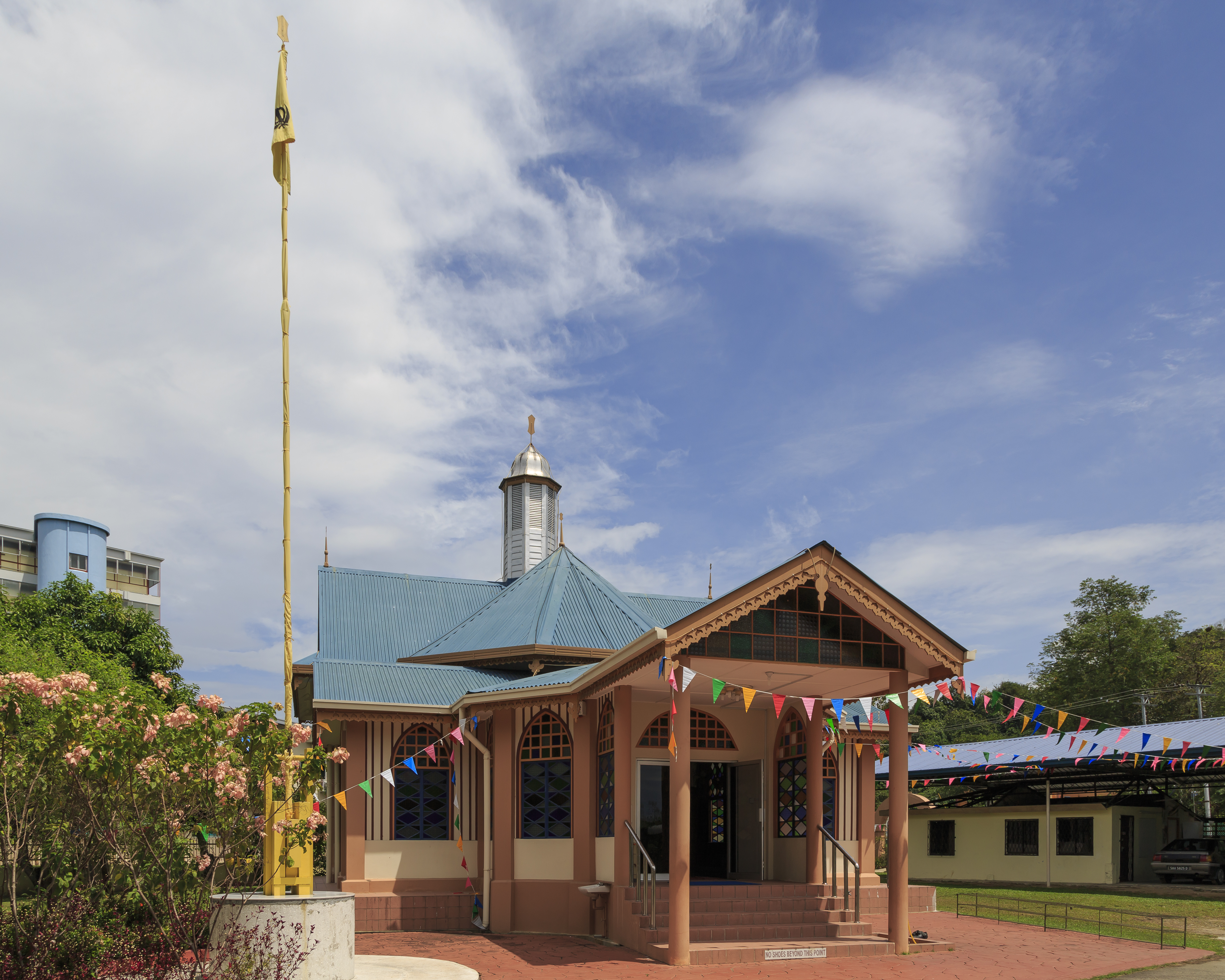
Kota Kinabalu Sabah Gurdwara Sahib

==== Labuan ====
- Gurdwara Sahib Labuan

==== Kedah ====
- Gurdwara Sahib Kulim
- Gurdwara Sahib Sungai Petani
- Gurdwara Sahib Alor Setar

==== Kelantan ====
- Gurdwara Sahib Tumpat
- Gurdwara Sahib Kota Bahru
- Gurdwara Sahib Kuala Krai

==== Melaka ====
- Gurdwara Sahib Melaka

==== Negeri Sembilan ====
- Gurdwara Sahib Mantin
- Gurdwara Sahib Jelebu
- Gurdwara Sahib Port Dickson
- Gurdwara Sahib Seremban
- Gurdwara Sahib Kuala Pilah
- Gurdwara Sahib Tampin
- Gurdwara Sahib Sri Sendayan

==== Pahang ====
- Gurdwara Sahib Brinchang
- Gurdwara Sahib Bentong
- Gurdwara Sahib Kuala Lipis
- Gurdwara Sahib Tanah Rata
- Gurdwara Sahib Raub
- Gurdwara Sahib Mentakab
- Gurdwara Sahib Kuantan

==== Penang ====
- Gurdwara Sahib Khalsa Dharmak Jatha
- Gurdwara Sahib Police Penang
- Wadda Gurdwara Sahib Penang
- Gurdwara Sahib Perai
- Gurdwara Sahib Butterworth
- Gurdwara Sahib Bayan Baru

==== Perak ====
- Gurdwara Sahib Ayer Papan
- Gurdwara Sahib Bagan Serai
- Gurdwara Sahib Batu Gajah
- Gurdwara Sahib Bercham
- Gurdwara Sahib Bidor
- Gurdwara Sahib Slim River
- Gurdwara Sahib Buntong
- Gurdwara Sahib Chemor
- Gurdwara Sahib Changkat Batu Gajah
- Gurdwara Sahib Changkat Tin
- Gurdwara Sahib Gopeng
- Gurdwara Sahib Greentown
- Gurdwara Sahib Gunong Rapat
- Gurdwara Sahib Jelapang
- Gurdwara Sahib Kampar
- Gurdwara Sahib Malim Nawar
- Gurdwara Sahib Kuala Kangsar
- Gurdwara Sahib Lahat
- Gurdwara Sahib Menglembu Adh Bazaar
- Gurdwara Sahib Menglembu Settlement
- Gurdwara Sahib Parit Buntar
- Gurdwara Sahib Sikh Dharmik Sabha
- Gurdwara Sahib Pokok Assam
- Gurdwara Shaheed Ganj Sahib
- Gurdwara Sahib Polis Ipoh
- Gurdwara Sahib Kampung Kepayang
- Gurdwara Sahib Pusing
- Gurdwara Sahib Railway
- Gurdwara Sahib Siputeh
- Gurdwara Sahib Sitiawan
- Gurdwara Sahib Sungai Siput
- Gurdwara Sahib Taiping
- Gurdwara Sahib Tambun
- Gurdwara Sahib Tanjong Malim
- Gurdwara Sahib Tanjong Rambutan
- Gurdwara Sahib Tanjong Tualang
- Gurdwara Sahib Tapah
- Gurdwara Sahib Teluk Intan
- Gurdwara Sahib Tronoh
- Gurdwara Sahib Tronoh Mines
- Wadda Gurdwara Sahib Ipoh

==== Perlis ====
- Gurdwara Sahib Kangar

==== Sabah ====
- Gurdwara Sahib Singh Sabha Lahad Datu
- Gurdwara Sahib Tawau
- Gurdwara Sahib Kota Kinabalu
- Gurdwara Sahib Sandakan

==== Sarawak ====
- Gurdwara Sahib Kuching
- Gurdwara Sahib Sibu
- Gurdwara Sahib Miri

==== Philippines ====
- Nanak Darbar Indian Sikh Temple, Iloilo City
- Khalsa Diwan Temple, Manila

==== Singapore ====
- Central Sikh Temple

== Africa ==
=== Kenya ===
- Sikh Temple Makindu, Makindu

== Europe ==
=== United Kingdom ===
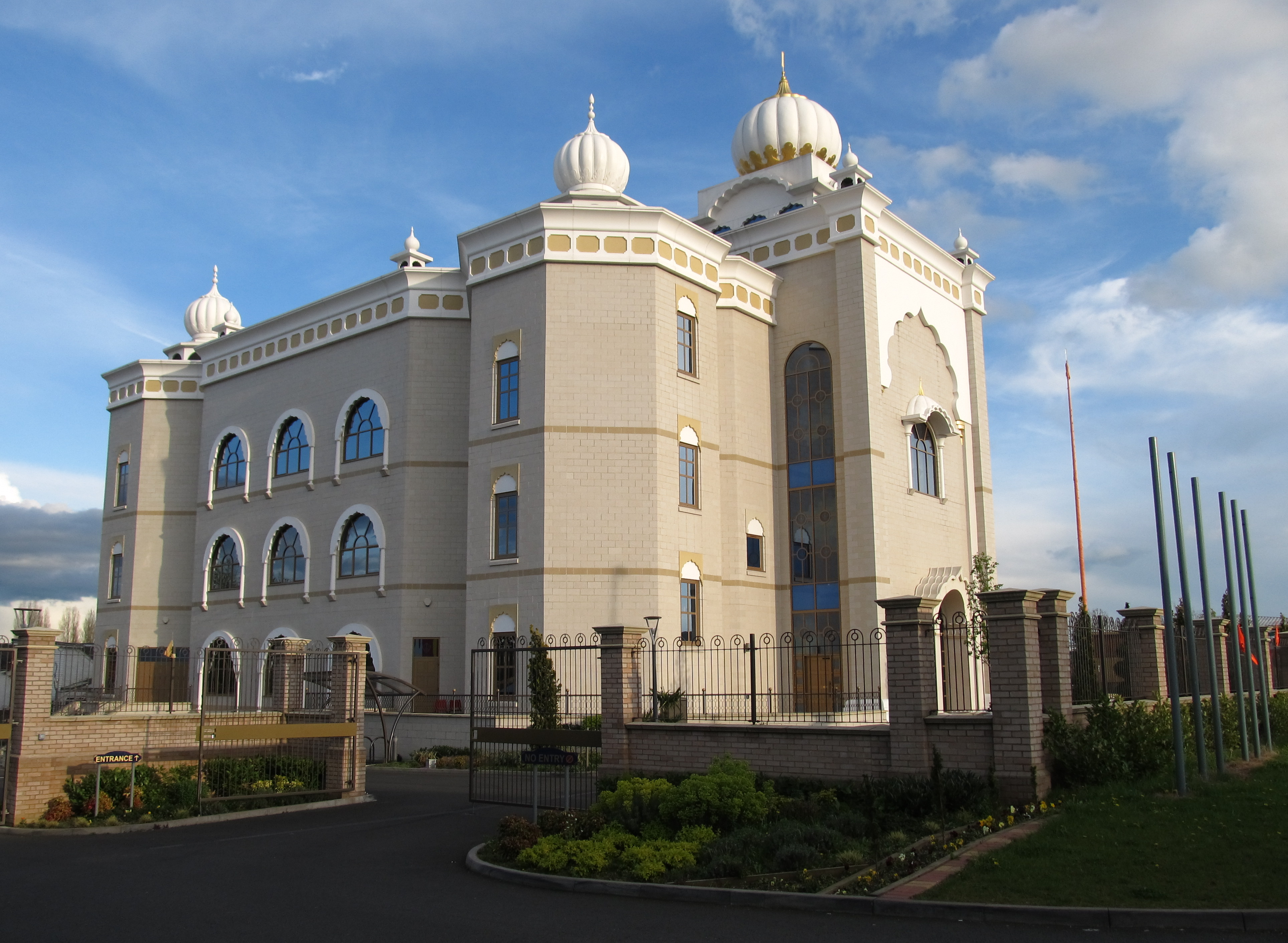
Gurdwara Sahib Leamington and Warwick

== North America ==
=== Canada ===
- Gur Sikh Temple, Abbotsford, British Columbia
- Khalsa Diwan Society Vancouver, Vancouver
- Ontario Khalsa Darbar, Ontario

== See also ==
- List of places visited by Guru Nanak
- List of Sikh festivals
