= Ghrispura =

Coordinates: 30°53′30″N 76°27′34″E

Ghrispura (also known as Gadhram Khurd) is a village on the Guru Gobind Singh Marg route, in the Ropar district of Punjab, India. It is approximately 5 kilometres (3.1 mi) from Chamkaur Sahib and about 40 kilometres (25 mi) from Chandigarh.

Ghirspura is a small farming community with a population of about 150, mainly of Jat Sikhs and Mazhabi Sikhs. The village has an elementary school, and the closest high schools are in Bhaku Marja and Chamkaur Sahib. There is a Sikh gurdwara in the village, and all Jat Sikh in the village carry the Shahi last name.

== History ==
Two Jat Sikh Shahi brothers, Deva and Lakha, moved in the mid-19th century from a village called Hargana in the Fatehgarh Sahib district of Punjab. In Hargana, Shahi families belong to both Sikh and Hindu religions. Since the 1960s, descendants of Deva and Lakha have migrated within India (Samalkha, Haryana and Kolkata) and to other countries; Arusha in Tanzania, the United Kingdom, United States, Canada and Australia.
