= Kakraita =

Village in Agra, Uttar Pradesh

Coordinates: 27°12′57″N 77°58′30″E

Kakraita, also known as Kakrahta or Kakrentha, is a village of Sikandra block of Agra District in Uttar Pradesh, India.

== Geography ==
The village is on the banks of the Yamuna River, with Mathura district to the west.

The main spoken language is Hindi, as the major population is Hindu. The local pin code for the village is 282007, as it falls in the Sikandra block of Agra district.

== Location ==
Gurudwara Guru ka Tal, a tourist and Sikh religious destination, is located in village, and the monument Akbar's tomb and NH-19, which connects it with Mathura district, are nearby.
