= Dhamtan Sahib =

Town in Haryana, India

- town
- Interactive map of Dhamtan Sahib
- Location in Haryana, India Dhamtan Sahib (India)
- Coordinates: 29.697553°N 76.021633°E
- Country: India
- State: Haryana
- District: Jind
- Talukas: Narwana

Population (2019)
  - Total: 12,750

Languages
- Time zone: UTC+5:30 (IST)
- PIN: 126116
- Nearest city: Tohana

Dhamtan Sahib, is a town in the Narwana tehsil of Jind district in Haryana, India. It is under the Narwana Assembly constituency and the Sirsa parliamentary constituency. Tohana is the nearest town to Dhamtan Sahib for all major economic activities. It is famous for its Sikh religious Gurdwara Sri Guru Tegh Bahadur Sahib.
