= Guru Gobind Singh Marg =

Historical route taken by Guru Gobind Singh

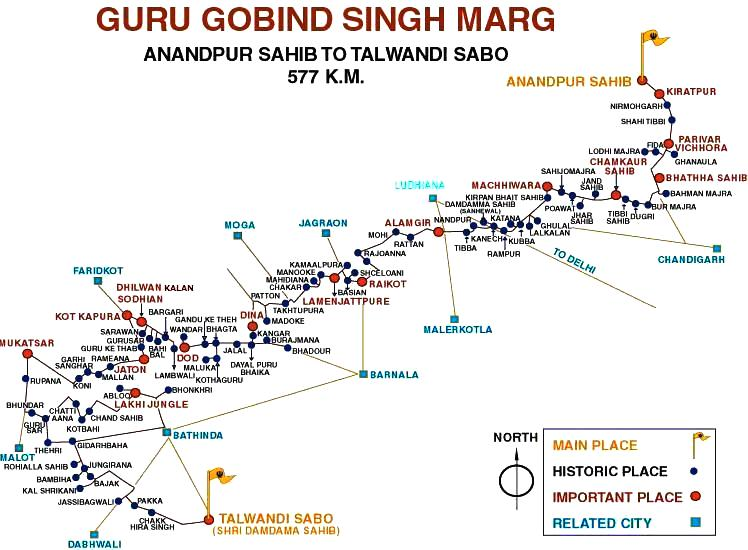
Map of the route

Guru Gobind Singh Marg is the historical route taken by the tenth Sikh guru Gobind Singh from Anandpur Sahib to Talwandi Sabo in 1705, considered a holy journey in Sikhism. The 47 day journey is notable in the history of Punjab. It measures about 577 kilometres.

== History ==
Guru Gobind Singh Marg was inaugurated on April 10, 1973, with the efforts of Giani Zail Singh, then the Chief Minister of Punjab. The project helped popularize the Sikh celebrations of Vaisakhi and Hola Maholla at Anandpur Sahib, leading to the build-up of infrastructure there. In 2006 it was proposed the road be extended to Nanded, Maharashtra.

== Prominent landmarks ==
Prominent Gurdwaras connected by this highway are Anandpur Sahib, Parivar Vichora, Bhatha Sahib, Chamkaur Sahib, Machhiwara, Alamgir Sahib, Raikot, Dina Kangar, Kotkapura, Muktsar and Talwandi Sabo.

== Gallery ==
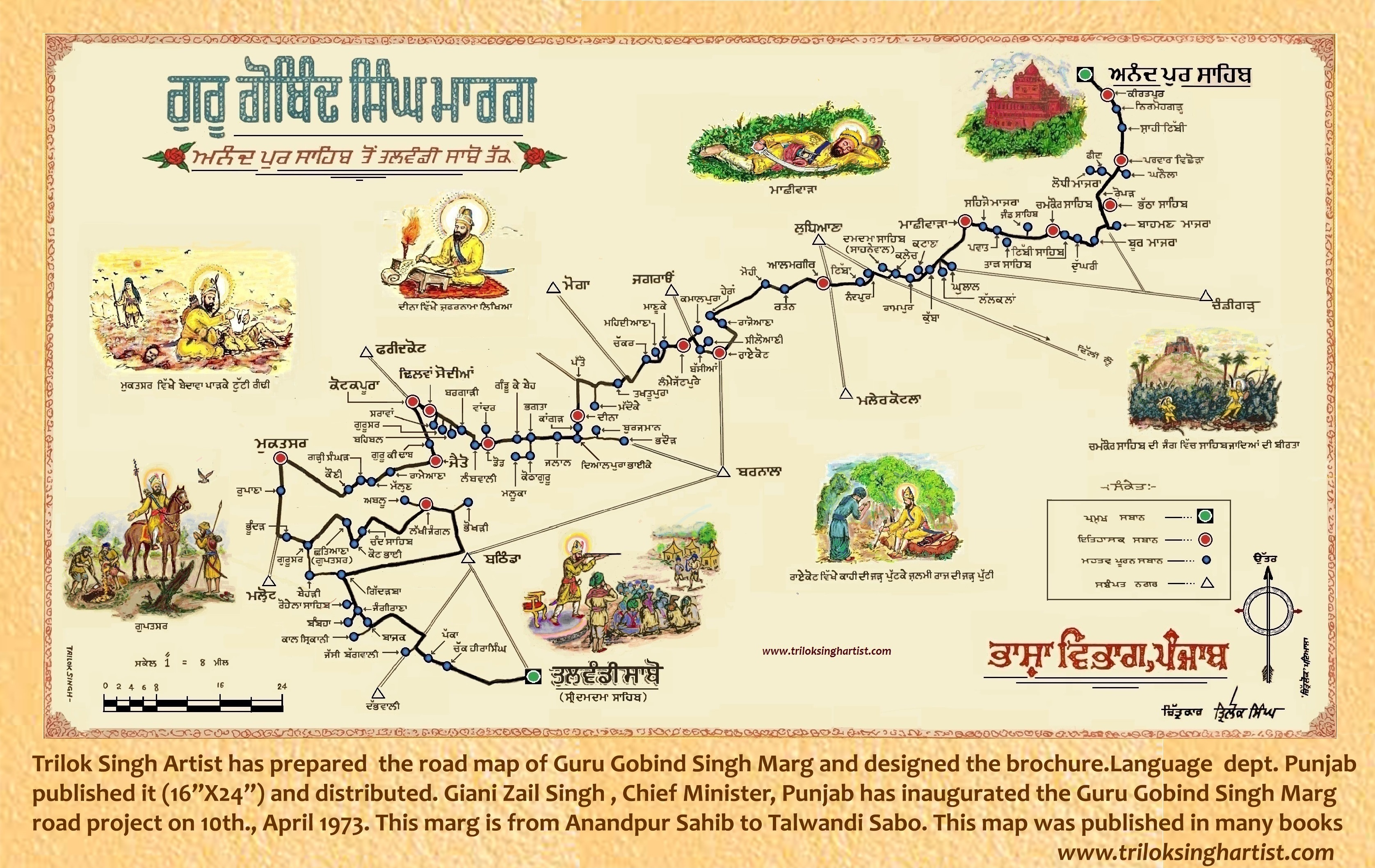
Map of Guru Gobind Singh Marg by Trilok Singh, 1972

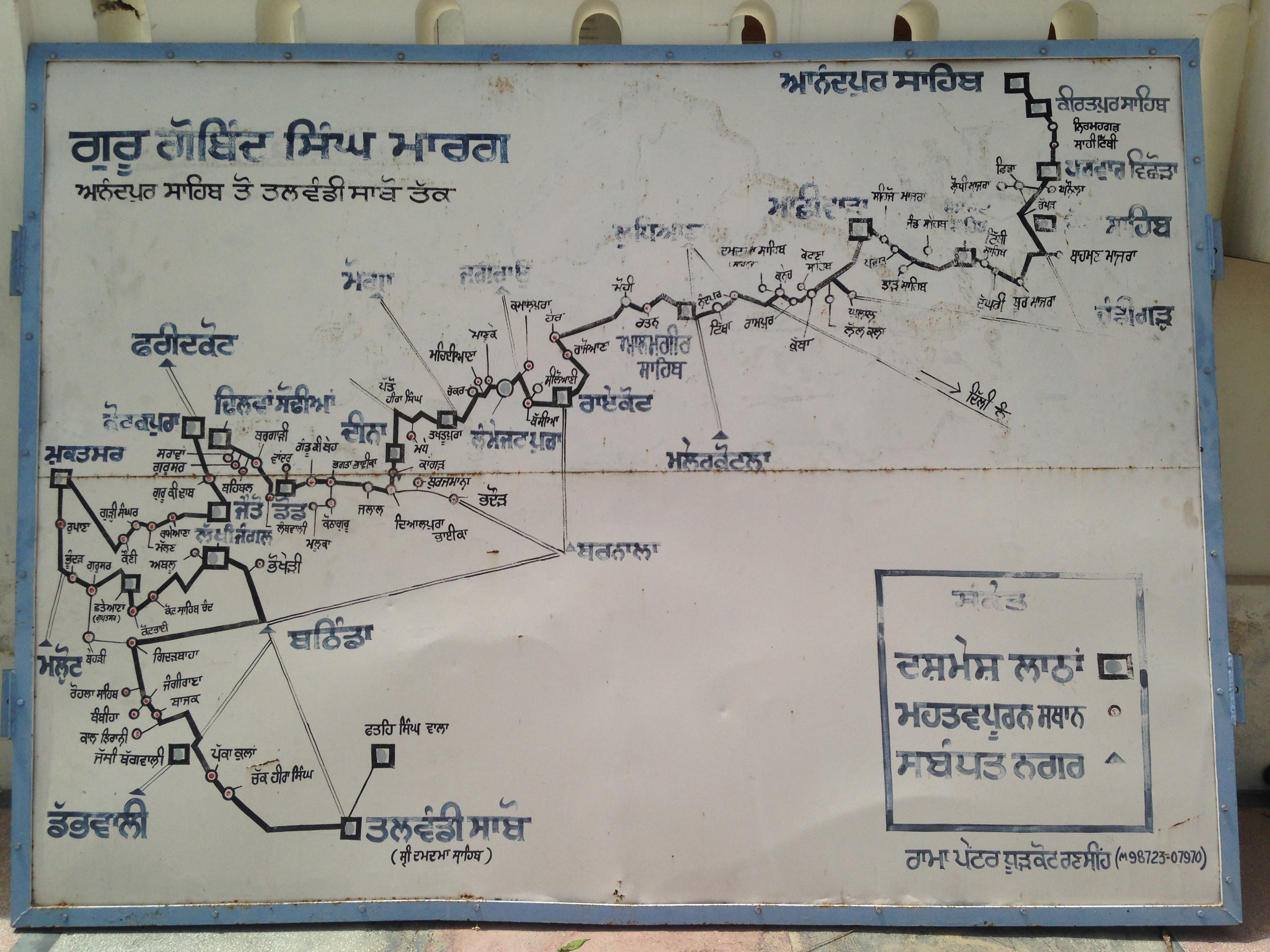
Map of Guru Gobind Singh Marg displayed at Gurdwara Lohgarh Sahib

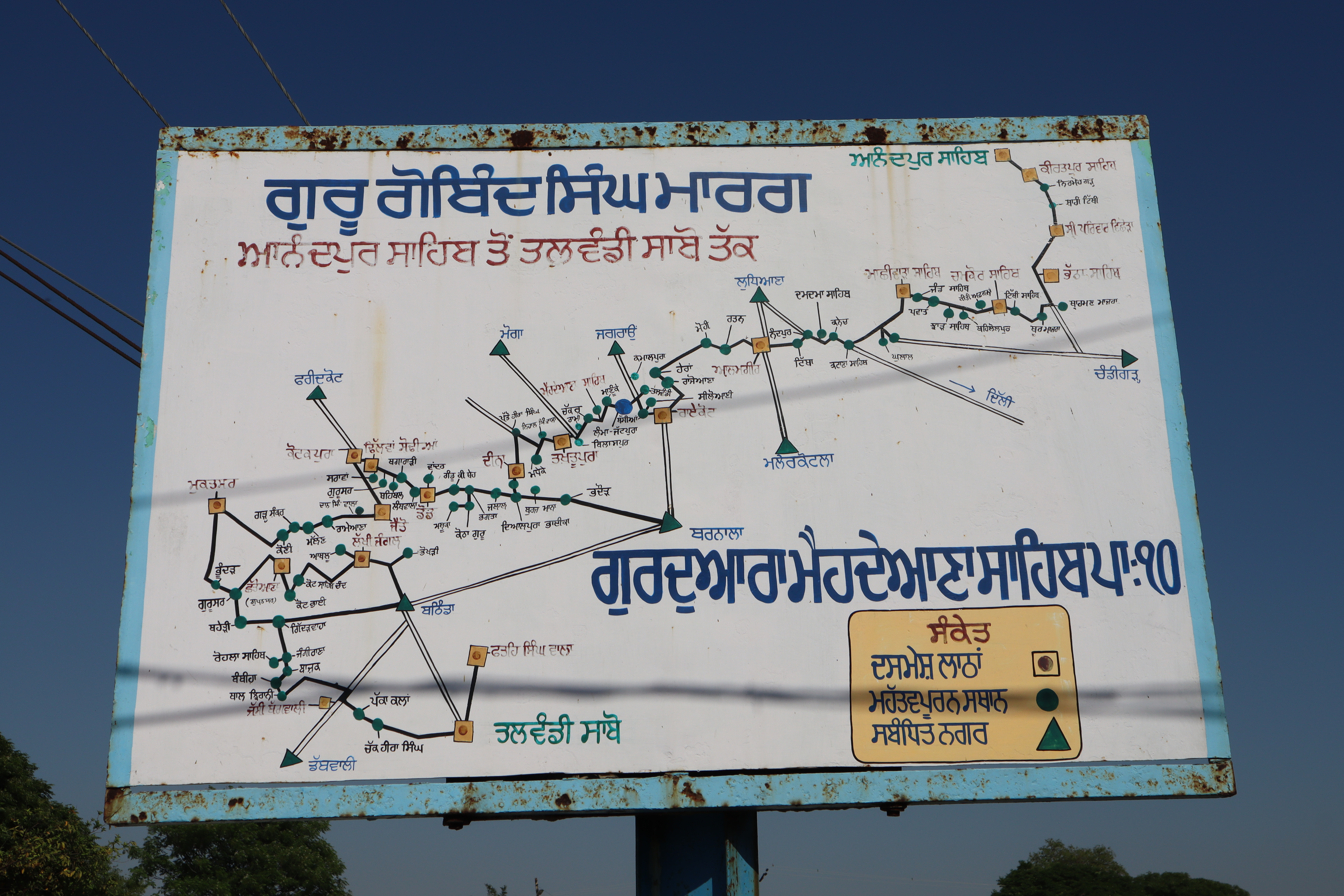
Map of Guru Gobind Singh Marg displayed at Gurdwara Mehdiana Sahib

== See also ==
- Battle of Chamkaur
- Battle of Muktsar
- Saka Sirhind
