= Gurdwara Likhansar Sahib =

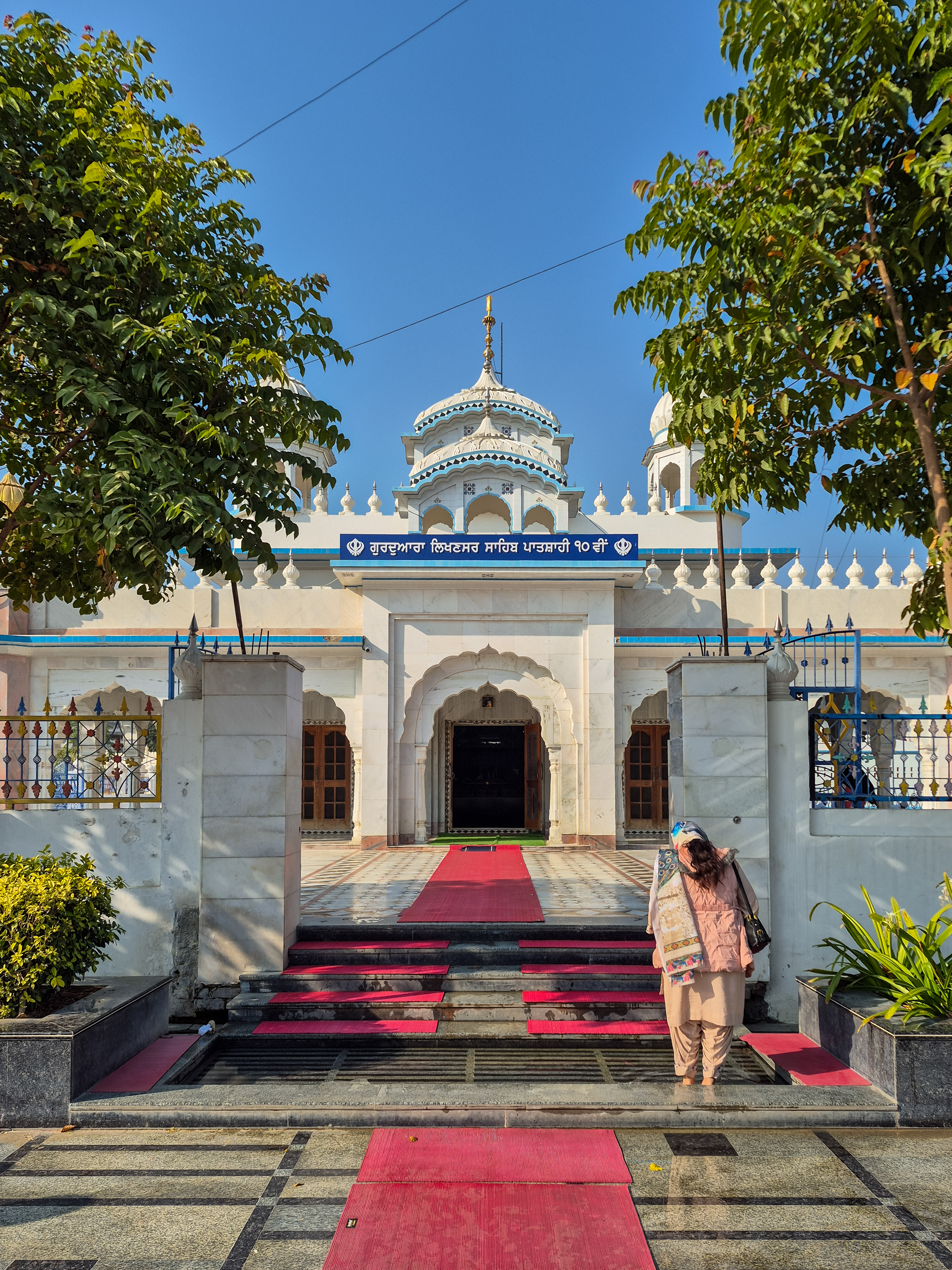

General information
- Architectural style: Sikh architecture
- Location: Talwandi Sabo, Bathinda, India
- Coordinates: 29.9876551°N 75.0793156°E
- Completed: 18th Century

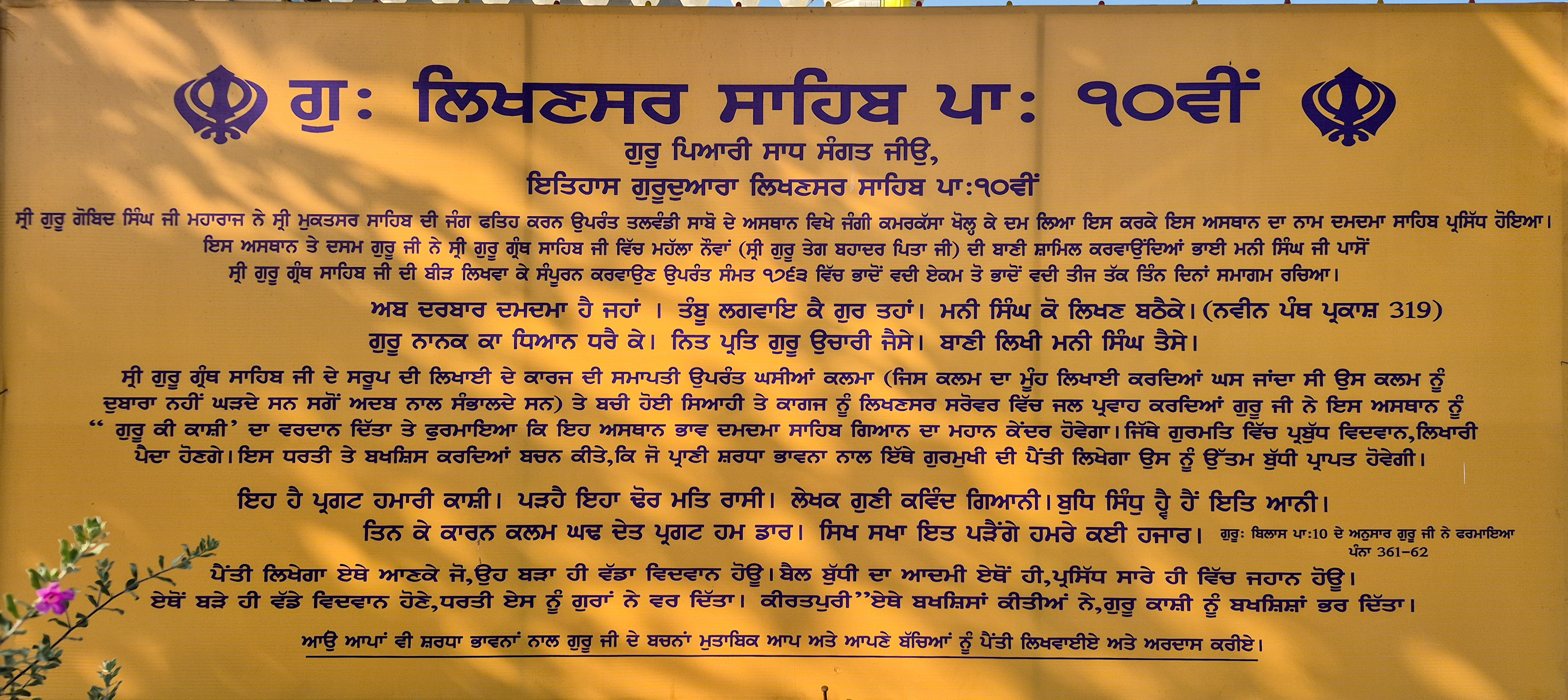
brief history

Gurdwara Likhansar Sahib is an historical Gurdwara situated in Talwandi Sabo (District Bhathinda) in Punjab, India. This is adjacent to Takht Sri Damdama Sahib.

== See also ==
- Damdami Taksal
- Gurdwara Dam Dama Sahib
- Balwant Singh Nandgarh
