= Gurdwara Sri Guru Tegh Bahadur Sahib, Dhamtan Sahib =

Gurdwara in Haryana, India

Gurdwara Sri Guru Tegh Bahadur Sahib
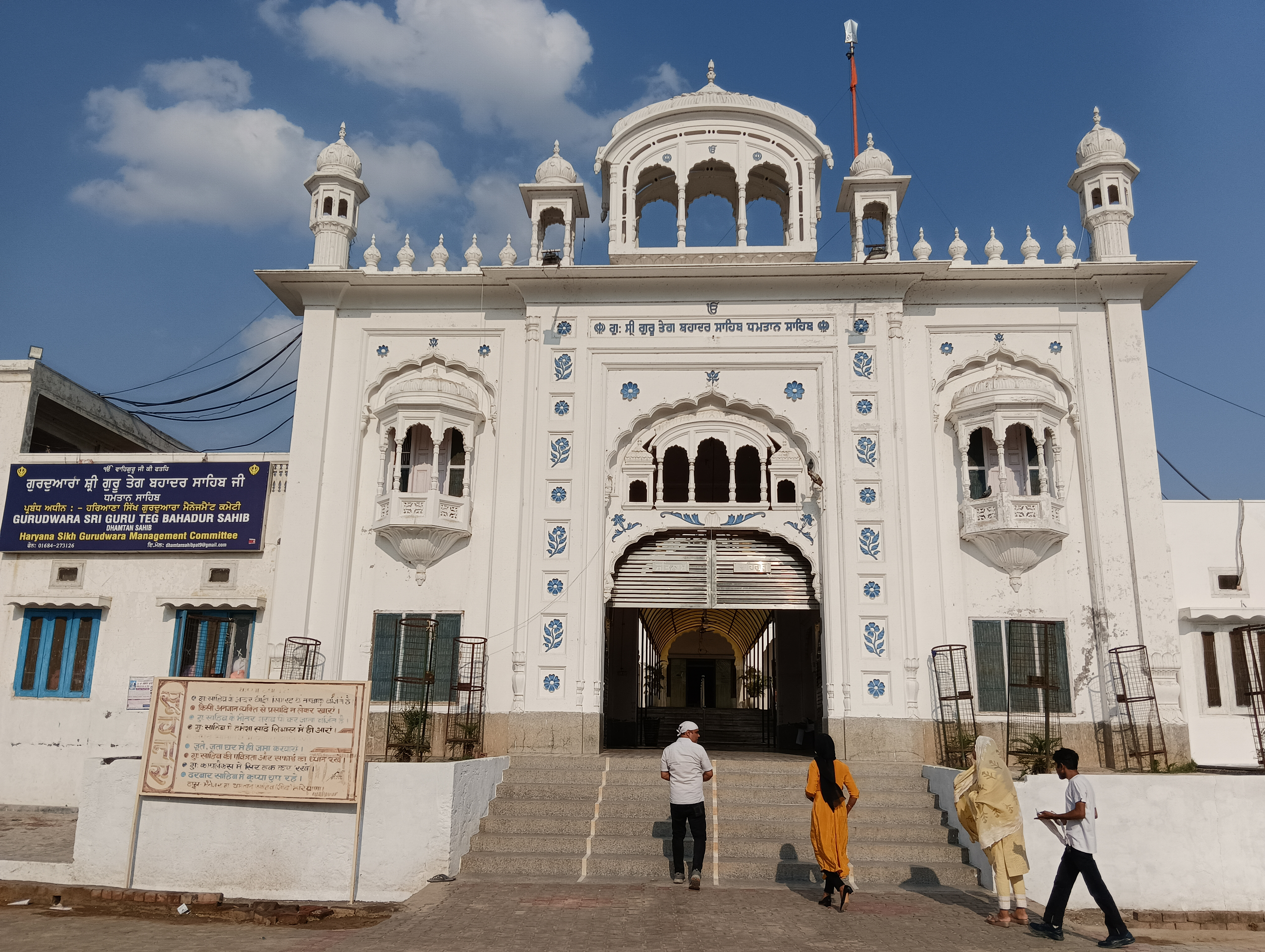

- Location within Haryana Location within India

Religion
- Affiliation: Sikhism

Location
- Location: Dhamtan Sahib
- State: Haryana
- Country: India
- Interactive map of Gurdwara Sri Guru Tegh Bahadur Sahib
- Coordinates: 29.7019375°N 76.0193904°E

Gurdwara Sri Guru Tegh Bahadur Sahib is a gurdwara in Jind district of Haryana state in India.

== Gallery ==
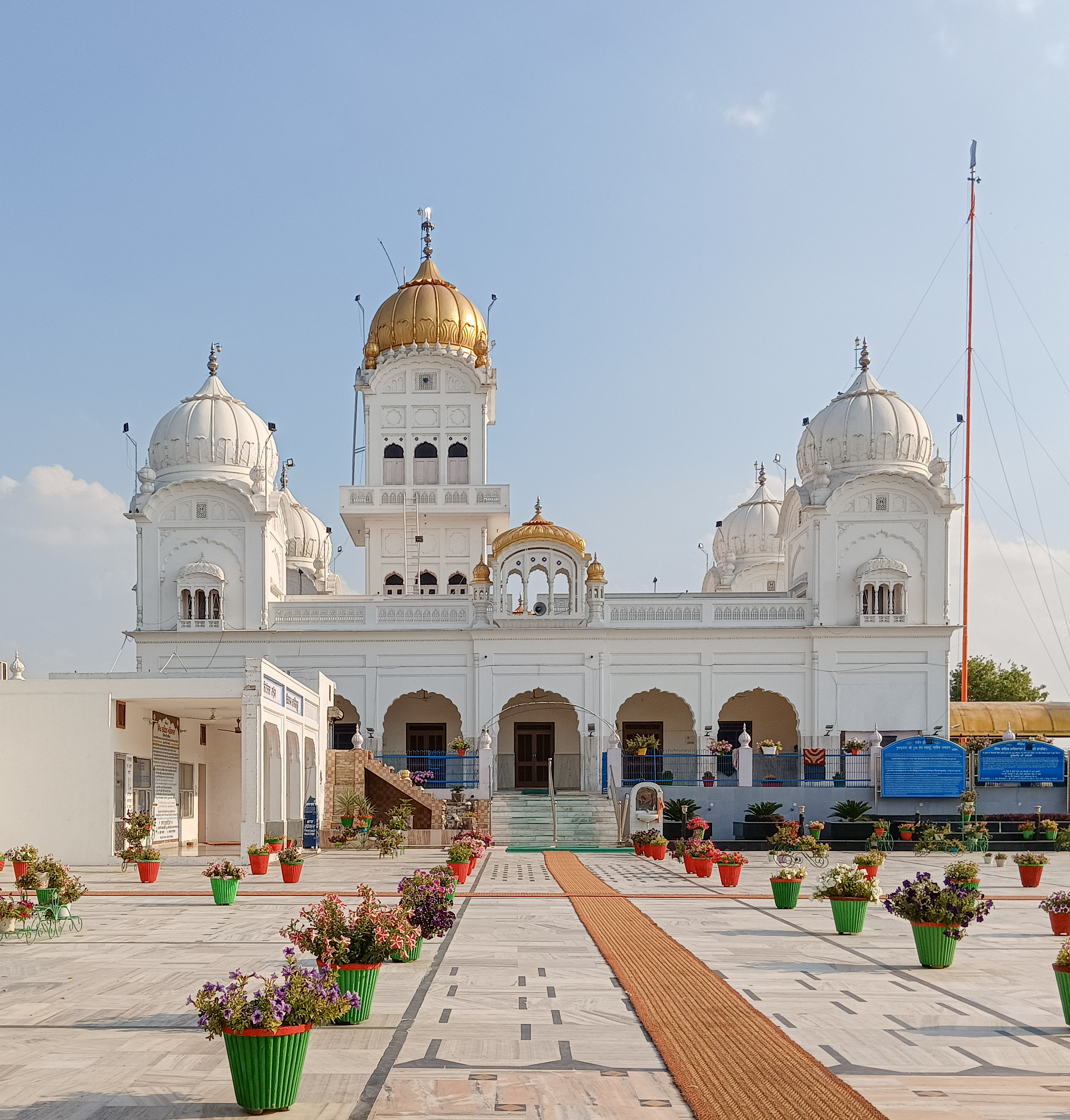

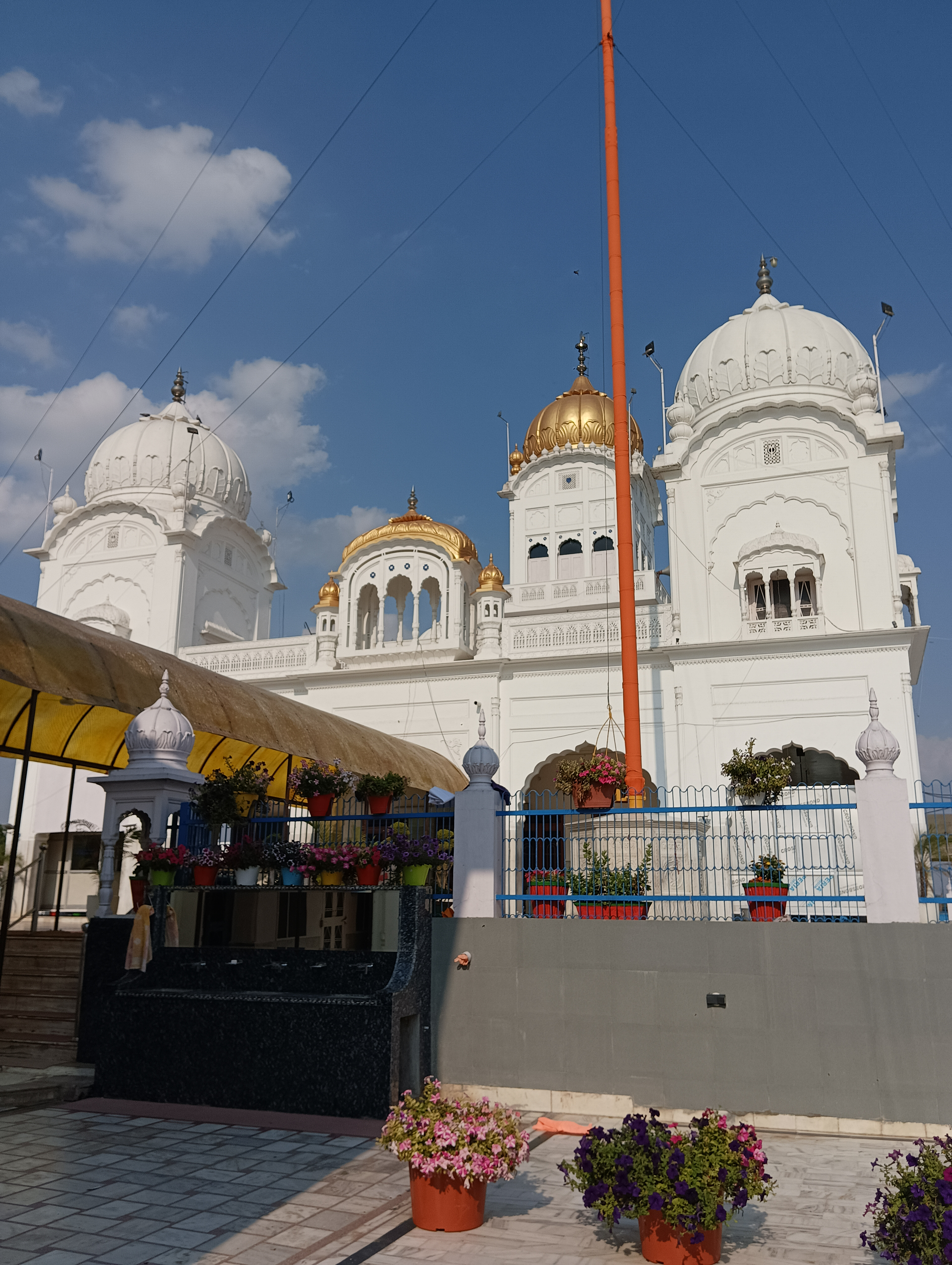
