= Gurudwara Nagiana Sahib =

Gurdwara, or holy Sikh shrine, in Punjab, India

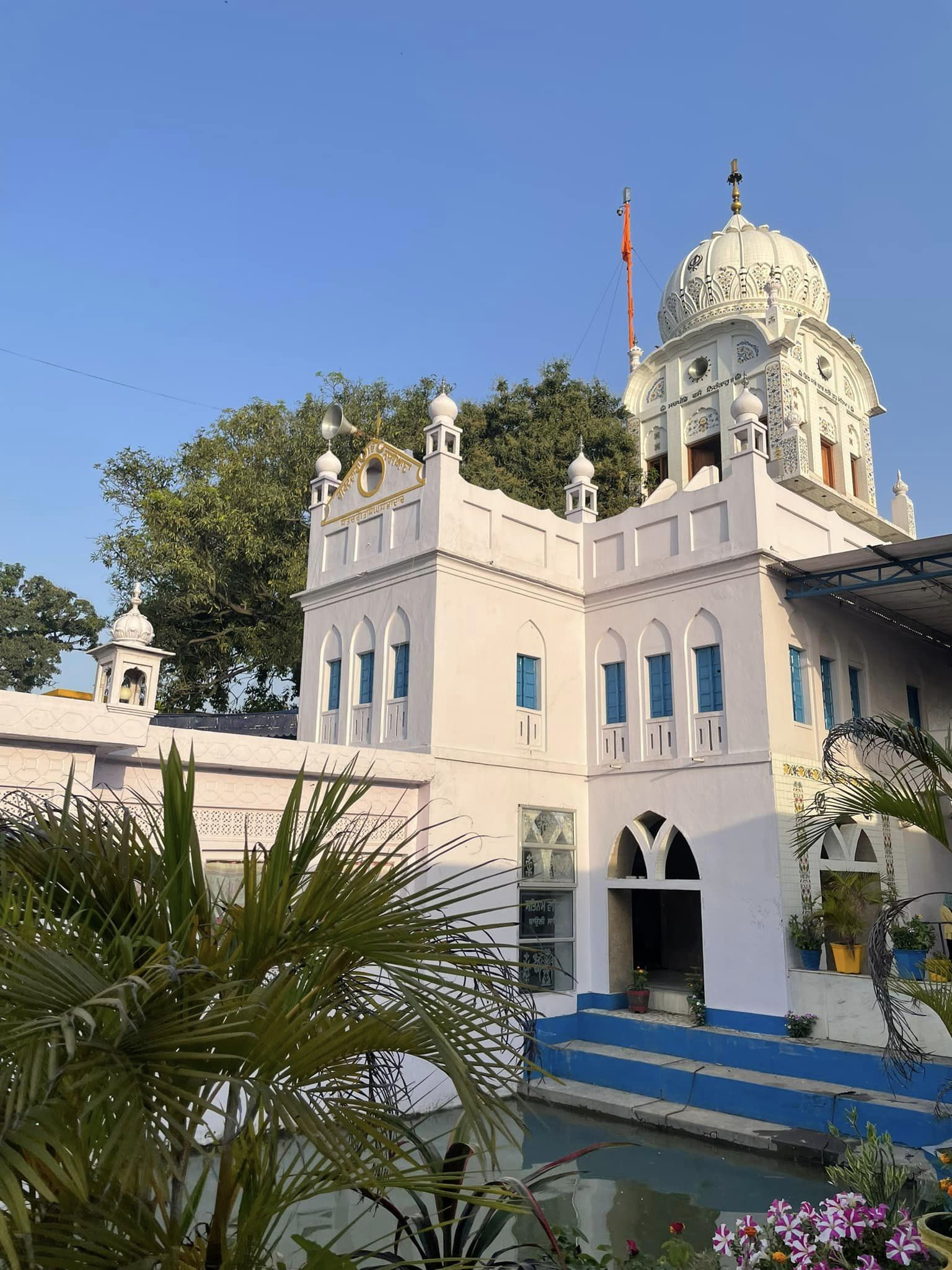

Gurdwara Nagiana Sahib is a Gurdwara, or holy Sikh shrine, located in Udoke, a small village near Batala in Punjab, India. The shrine was built by the Sikh saint Sant Baba Chuggat Singh Ji, who served as the first official Sewadar (volunteer) of the shrine.

This is a place of worship for Nagis' (Nagi clan). The Nagiana Gurdwara is Jathera of Nagis. "Jathera" is a folk religion of Punjab where one worships their ancestors or something related to their ancestors or clan. Jathera was common folk religion among Punjabis prior to Sikh religion regardless of caste. After converting to Sikh religion some Jatheras were turned into Gurdwaras.

Initially only Nagis' used to visit the Gurdwara. September 8th has been chosen as Nagi Day, a significant day for Gurdwara Nagiana Sahib and when most sangat (visitors) visit the Gurdwara.

This is also a place tied to the history of Sri Guru Nanak Dev Ji.

== Historical Background ==
The shrine's main building was built by Sant Baba Chuggat Singh Ji, believed to be the Gurudwara's first sewada. According to Sikh Tradition, this shrine is believed to have historical ties to Sri Guru Nanak Dev Ji.

Gurdwara Nagiana Sahib is linked to the spiritual journey of Guru Nanak Dev Ji, the founder of Sikhism. During one of his Udasis (spiritual travels), Guru Nanak Dev Ji was said to have a miraculous encounter with a snake in the village of Udoke.

== Architectural Significance ==
Gurdwara Nagiana Sahib is a blend of traditional Sikh architecture and local design elements. At the center of the Gurudwara is a central dome, a key feature in Sikh architecture, symbolizing the oneness of God and the presence of the Divine in all aspects of life.

Surrounding the central dome are prayer halls, designed to accommodate large gatherings. The Gurdwara's exterior is white marble. Marble is often used in Sikh religious structures and has carvings and decorative patterns. The courtyards in the Gurdwara grounds provide additional space for community gatherings and contemplation.

== Role in the Community ==
The Gurdwara trust runs a number of charitable services. Gurdwara Nagiana Sahib offers educational programs, particularly aimed at children from underprivileged backgrounds. The Gurdwara also organizes free medical camps. These camps typically provide free consultations, medical check-ups, and medications. Since 2009 the trust has run a charitable hospital for the poor and needy people of village.

== Administration ==
The administration of the Gurdwara, is taken care by Baba Chuggat Singh Prabandhak Committee, a non-profit institution.
