= Gurdwara Naulakha Sahib =

Gurudwara Naulakha Sahib Gurudwara Sahib Naulakha
- Religion Place
- Location within Punjab Location within India
- Coordinates: 30.53°N 76.40°E
- Country: India
- State: Punjab
- District: Fatehgarh Sahib
- Village: Naulakha
- Established: 1830

Government
  - Type: Panchayati raj (India)
  - Body: Gram panchayat
- Elevation: 262 m (860 ft)
- Time zone: UTC+5:30 (IST)
- PIN: 147104
- Telephone: 01763 260574
- ISO 3166 code: IN-PB

Gurudwara Naulakha Sahib is situated in the village of Naulakha, Fatehgarh Sahib district in Punjab, India. This village is situated on Patiala-Sirhind Road. Almost 19 km from Patiala and 13 km from Sirhind.

== History ==
The villages name is said to come from an event when Guru Tegh Bahadur and Mata Gujri stayed there for a day and night on a tour of the Malwa region. While he was there Lakhi Shah Wanjara lost his ox, and pledged he would offer several takkas to the guru if he regained his ox. He found his ox in the jungle, and came to the guru offering him nine takas, which the guru forwarded on to the Sangat without even touching. Wanjara thought the guru was dissatisfied with the offering, so said that he did not have enough money for a large offering, but would give more of the same amount. The guru responded that Wanjara's nine takkas were equivalent to nine lakhs of takka (nau lakh). Later people came to catch a glimpse of the guru, and he blessed them and asked them to name the village Naulakha ("nine lakh").
