= Takht Sri Damdama Sahib =

Sikh religious site in Talwandi Sabo, Punjab, India

- Flag of Takht

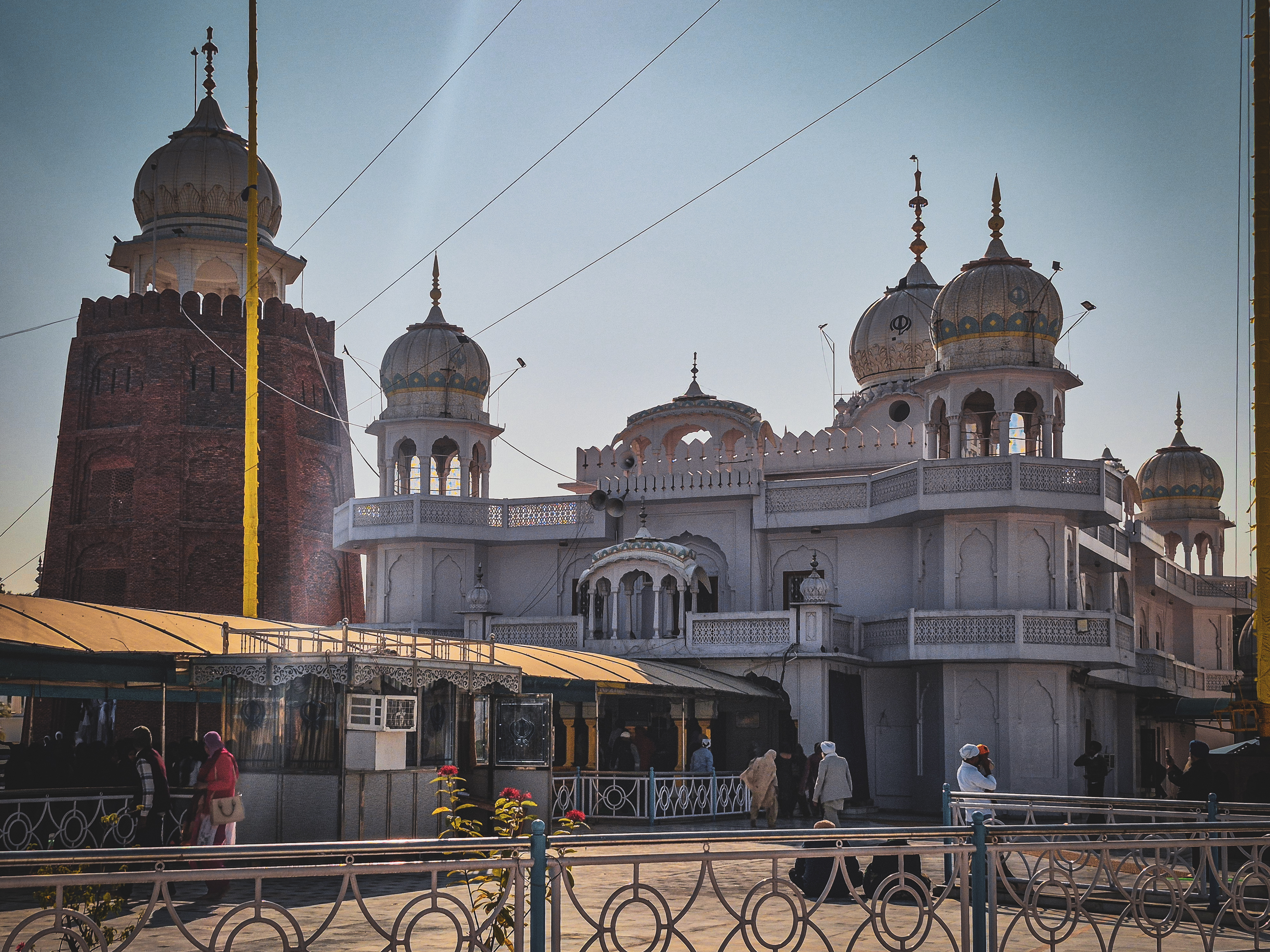

General information
- Status: Takht of the Sikhs
- Architectural style: Sikh architecture
- Location: Talwandi Sabo, Bathinda district, Punjab, India, Talwandi Sabo, India
- Coordinates: 29.9869°N 75.0786°E

The Takht Sri Darbar Sahib Damdama Sahib, is one of the five takhts or Seat of Temporal Authority of Sikhism, located in Talwandi Sabo, near the city of Bathinda in Bathinda district of Punjab, India. (Note: Takht Damdama Sahib's position as the fifth takht in Sikhism is disputed by the Budha Dal faction of Akali-Nihang Sikhs, who claim their group is the fifth takht.) At this place Guru Gobind Singh, the tenth Sikh Guru, prepared the full version of the Sikh scriptures called Sri Guru Granth Sahib in 1705. The other four Takhts are the Akal Takht Sahib, Takht Sri Keshgarh Sahib, Takht Sri Patna Sahib and Takht Sri Hazur Sahib.

== History ==
The Takht is in the Talwandi Sabo, 28 km southeast of Bathinda. Literally, Damdama means resting place. Guru Gobind Singh stayed here after the Sikhs fought several defensive battles. According to G. S. Mann, Guru Gobind Singh founded Damdama Sahib in 1705.

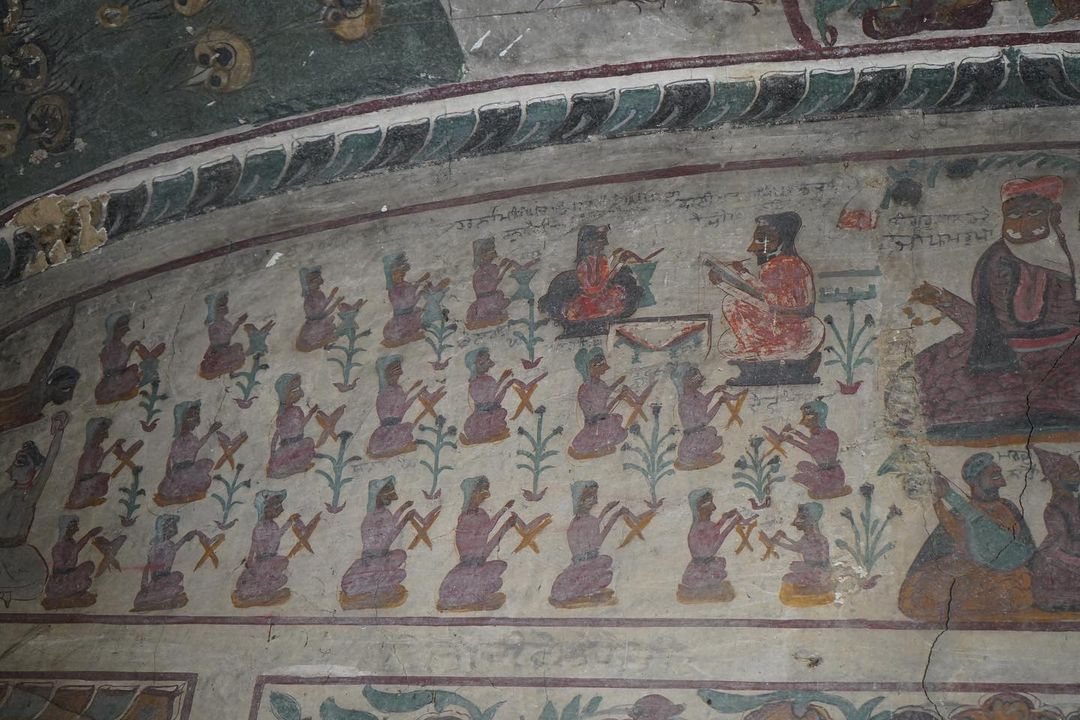
Detail of a mural depicting a santhiya scene, from the Bhai Dalla samadh at Talwandi Sabo, ca.1710–40. The mural depicts 48 Sikhs being trained in scriptural elocution.

A combination of Mughals and hill chiefs besieged Anandpur Sahib on the orders of emperor Aurangzeb. Finally the stock of food in the town ran out. The Mughals promised safe passage to Punjab for the Sikhs if they would hand over the fortress of Anandpur. At first Guru Gobind tested their promise of safe passage by staging a test which the attackers failed miserably. Later, with promises written in the margins of the Muslims' Holy Qur'an and some of the sacred writings of the Hindu elements of the army that had all but starved his small contingent of family and Sikhs and a personal promise of safety by Aurangzeb sent by an agent of the Emperor who was fighting in the distant Deccan, the Guru was persuaded to agree to their offer, leaving Anandpur with his family and a small band of retainers. During the flight from Anandpur when the Sikhs were promised safe passage to Punjab, Sahibzada Fateh Singh was, with his elder brother Sahibzada Zorawar Singh, put under the care of his grandmother, Mata Gujari ji. Unfortunately in the confusion of the rain-swollen Sarsa (normally little more than a creek) and an attack by Mughal pursuers, the Guru's two youngest sons and their grandmother were separated from the main body of Sikhs. Managing to get across, they were befriended by one of the Guru's former cooks. Later betrayed and handed off by the authorities of the small village where they had been given sanctuary, they were handed over to agents of Wazir Khan, carted off to Sirhind, and placed under arrest in the Khan's Thanda Burj (cold tower). The Thanda Burj was built to capture the cool night breezes of air drawn over water channels in the hot summers, during the dead of winter the unheated burj offered no comfort for the Guru's mother and sons.

On 26 December 1705, Fateh and his elder brother Zorawar were martyred at Sirhind. Fateh Singh is probably the youngest recorded martyr in history: He knowingly laid down his life at the age of six years. Brothers Sahibzada Fateh Singh and Sahibzada Zorawar Singh are among the most hallowed martyrs in Sikhism.

Today, the place is known as Fatehgarh Sahib. An unequal but grim battle commenced with the sunrise on 7 December 1705 in the words of Guru Gobind Singh's Zafarnamah, a mere forty defying a hundred thousand (lakh). The besieged, after they had exhausted the meagre stock of ammunition and arrows, made sallies in batches of five each to engage the encircling host with sword and spear. Sahibzada Ajit Singh led one of the sallies and laid down his life fighting in the thick of the battle. He was 18 years old at the time of his supreme sacrifice for his faith. Gurdwara Qatalgarh now marks the spot where he fell, followed by Sahibzada Jujhar Singh, 14, who led the next sally. The valour displayed by the young sons of Guru Gobind Singh has been poignantly narrated by a modern Muslim poet Allahyar Khan Jogi who used to recite his Urdu poem, "ShahidaniWafa." from Sikh pulpits during the second and third decades of the twentieth century.

By nightfall Guru Gobind Singh was left with only five Sikhs in the fortress. These five urged him to escape so that he could rally his followers again and continue the struggle against oppression. The Guru agreed. He gave his own attire to Sangat Singh, who resembled him somewhat in features and physical stature. Under cover of darkness, he made his way through the encircling host slackened by the fatigue of the day's battle. Daya Singh, Dharam Singh and Man Singh also escaped leaving behind only two Sikhs: Sangat Singh and Sant Singh. The next morning as the attack was resumed, the imperial troops entered the garhi without much resistance and were surprised to find only two occupants who, determined to die rather than give in, gave battle till the last. Having reached safety Gobind wrote a letter in Persian prose, called the Zafarnamah (Epistle of Victory), to the Mughal Emperor Aurangzeb calling him to task as he had guaranteed safe passage to the Punjab for the Sikhs who had abandoned the city of Anandpur and its forts only to be attacked. Guru Gobind Singh fought a successful battle at Muktsar and then moved towards Talwandi Sabo.

== Guru Ki Kashi ==
Before leaving to visit Sikh Sangats in the Deccan, Guruji blessed Talwandi Sabo, as Guru Ki Kashi. Now known better as Damdama Sahib after the Gurdwara became one of the five temporal Takhats of the Sikh religion. Another great Shaheed (Martyr) of Sikhi, Baba Deep Singh ji was installed as the first Jathedar (head) of this temporal seat. He penned additional copies of the Adi Sri Granth Sahib ji and sent them to the other four temporal seats.

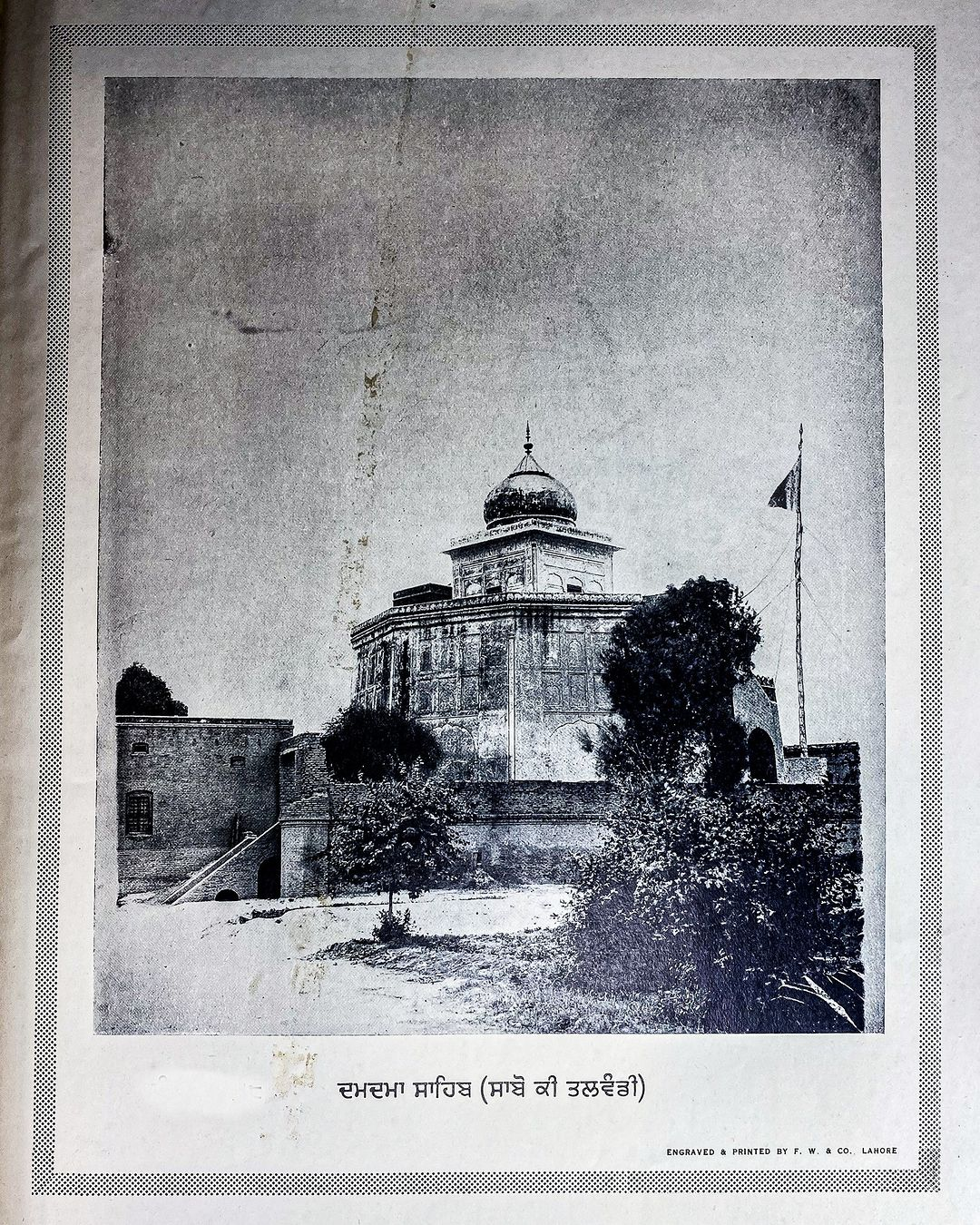
Historical photograph of Damdama Sahib (Sabo Ki Talwandi) in the 1920s.

This title was given because of the intense literary activities that Guru Gobind Singh engaged in during his stay here (the compilation of Sikh scriptures). It is said that one day Guru Gobind flung a handful of reed pens over the heads of the congregation ('Sangat'), saying: "Here we will create a pool of literature. No one of my Sikhs should remain illiterate." The Damdama Wali Bir as the Guru Granth Sahib is sometimes called was completed here, being dictated by the Guru to one of his disciples Bhai Mani Singh. It was at this time when the hymns of Guru Tegh Bahadur Sahib, the ninth Guru and father of Guru Gobind Singh were added to the Bir.

== Recognition as Takht ==
This Takht was officially recognized as the fifth Takht of Sikhism on 18 November 1966. On a demand from the Sikhs, a sub-committee was appointed by the Shiromani Gurdwara Prabandhak Committee, Amritsar by General Meeting Resolution No: 789 on 30 July 1960. A report of the sub-committee containing 183 pages was received to declare Damdama Sahib or Guru Ki Kashi as the fifth Takht of the Sikhs.

A general body meeting of the Shiromani Gurdwara Prabandhak Committee at Amritsar approved the recommendations through resolution number 32 on 18 November 1966. It was declared as the fifth Sikh Takht by the government of India in April 1999 during tricentennial celebrations of the formation of the Khalsa.

== Jathedars of Takht Damdama Sahib ==
Name	Assigned by	Term	Reference(s)
Baba Deep Singh	Guru Gobind Singh	7 August 1708 - 13 November 1757	
Sudh Singh	?	?	
Karam Singh	?	?	
Natha Singh	?	?	
Ran Singh	?	?	
Bhagwan Singh	?	?	
Baghel Singh	?	?	
Diwan Singh	?	?	
Ram Singh	?	?	
Harchand Singh Longowal	SGPC	1962 - 1964	
Sant Lakha Singh	SGPC	1987	
Giani Jaswant Singh	Sarbat Khalsa	26 January 1986 -	
Giani Jagir Singh Poohla	SGPC	1988 -	
Avtar Singh Brahma	?	1988	
Sanjh Hakam Singh	?	?	
Mehar Singh	?	?	
Giani Kewal Singh	SGPC	1993 - 12 January 2002	
Giani Balwant Singh Nandgarh	SGPC	6 January 2003 - 17 January 2015	
Giani Gurmukh Singh	SGPC	27 January 2015 - 21 April 2017	
Baba Baljit Singh Daduwal	Sarbat Khalsa	10 November 2015 - 26 August 2020	
Giani Harpreet Singh	SGPC	21 April 2017 - 9 February 2025	
Giani Jagtar Singh; Acting	SGPC	9 February 2025 - 7 March 2025	
Baba Tek Singh Dhanaula	SGPC	7 March 2025 - Incumbent	

== Gallery ==
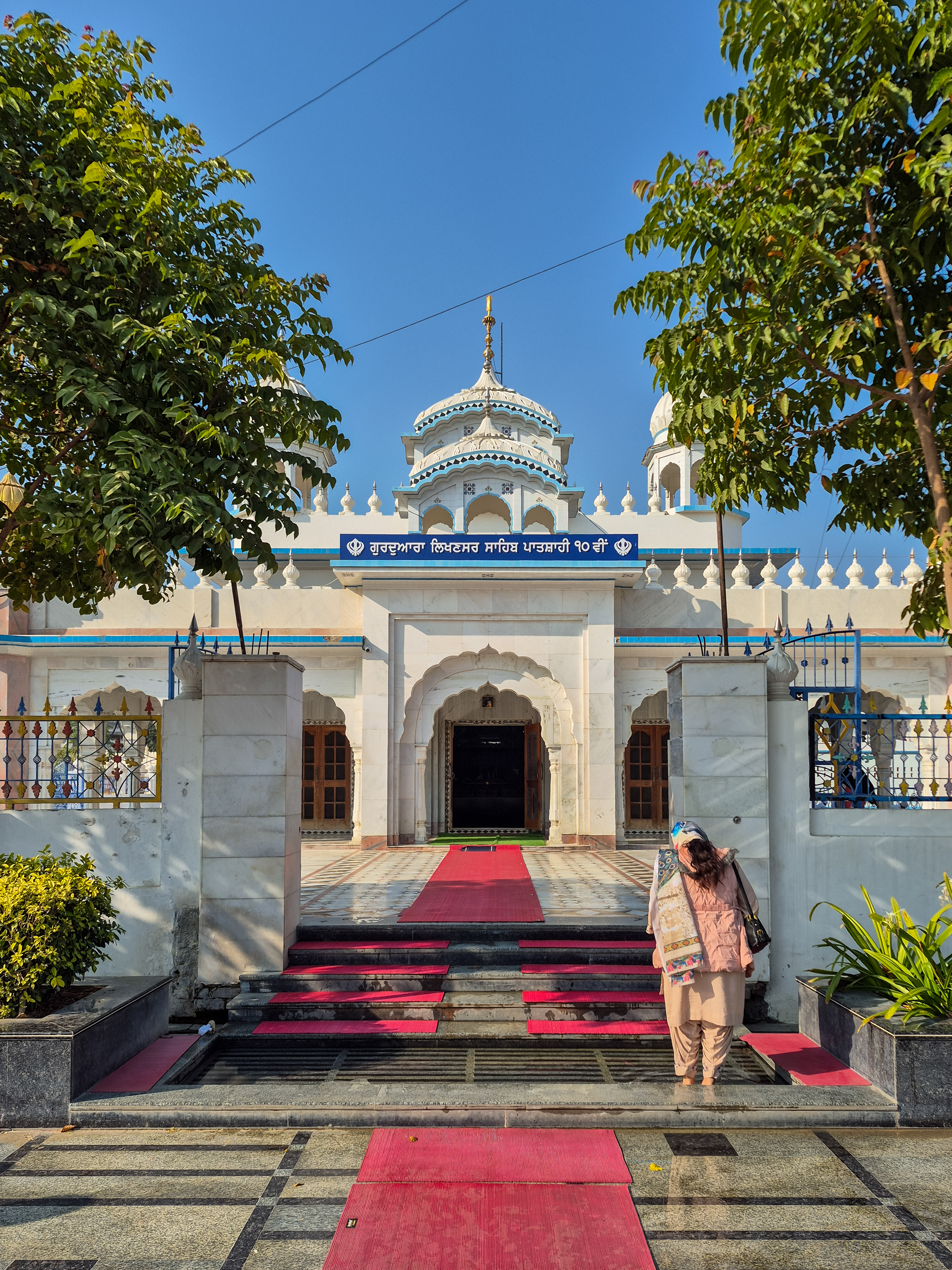
Gurdwara Likhansar Sahib

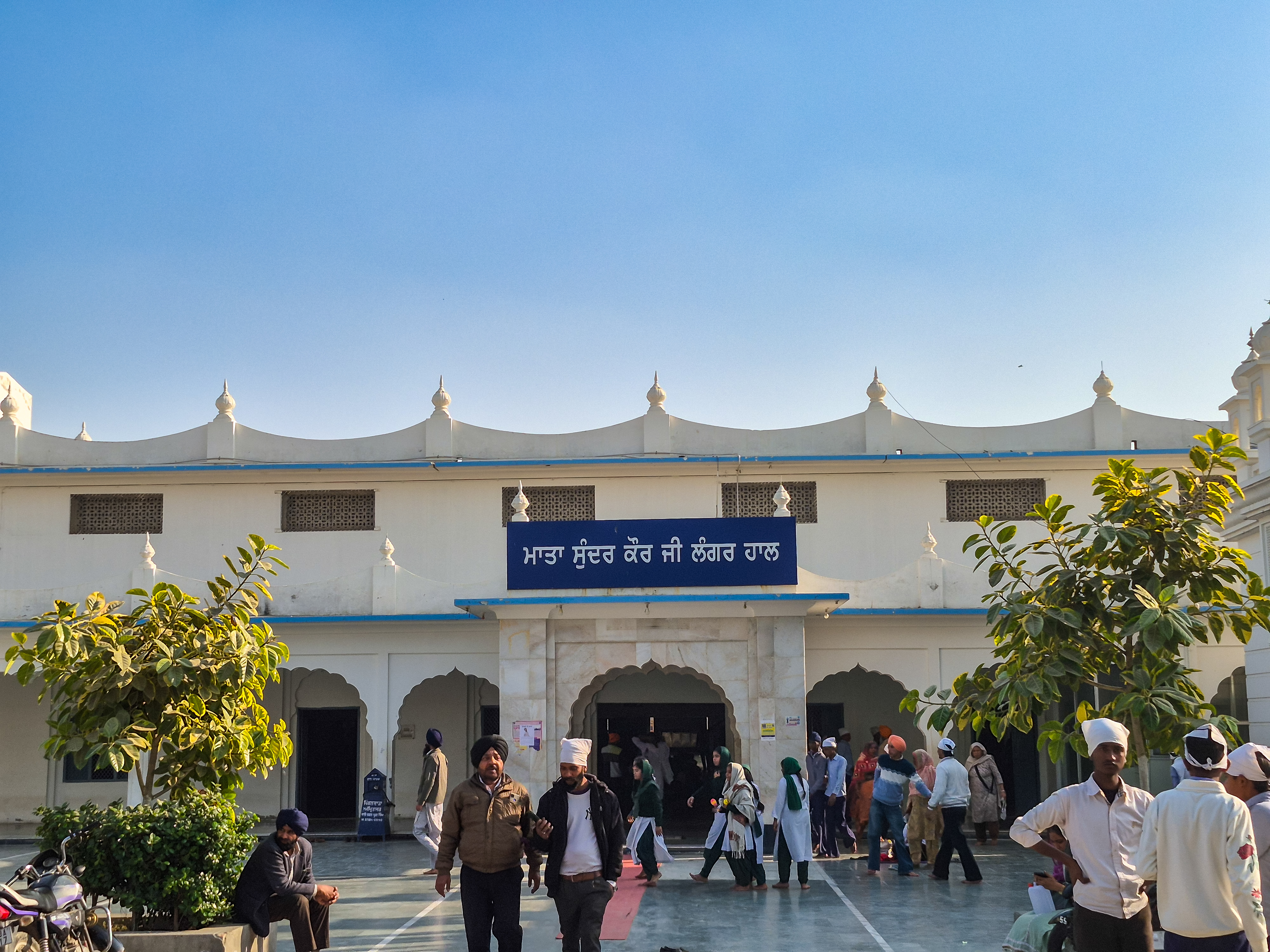
Langar Hall

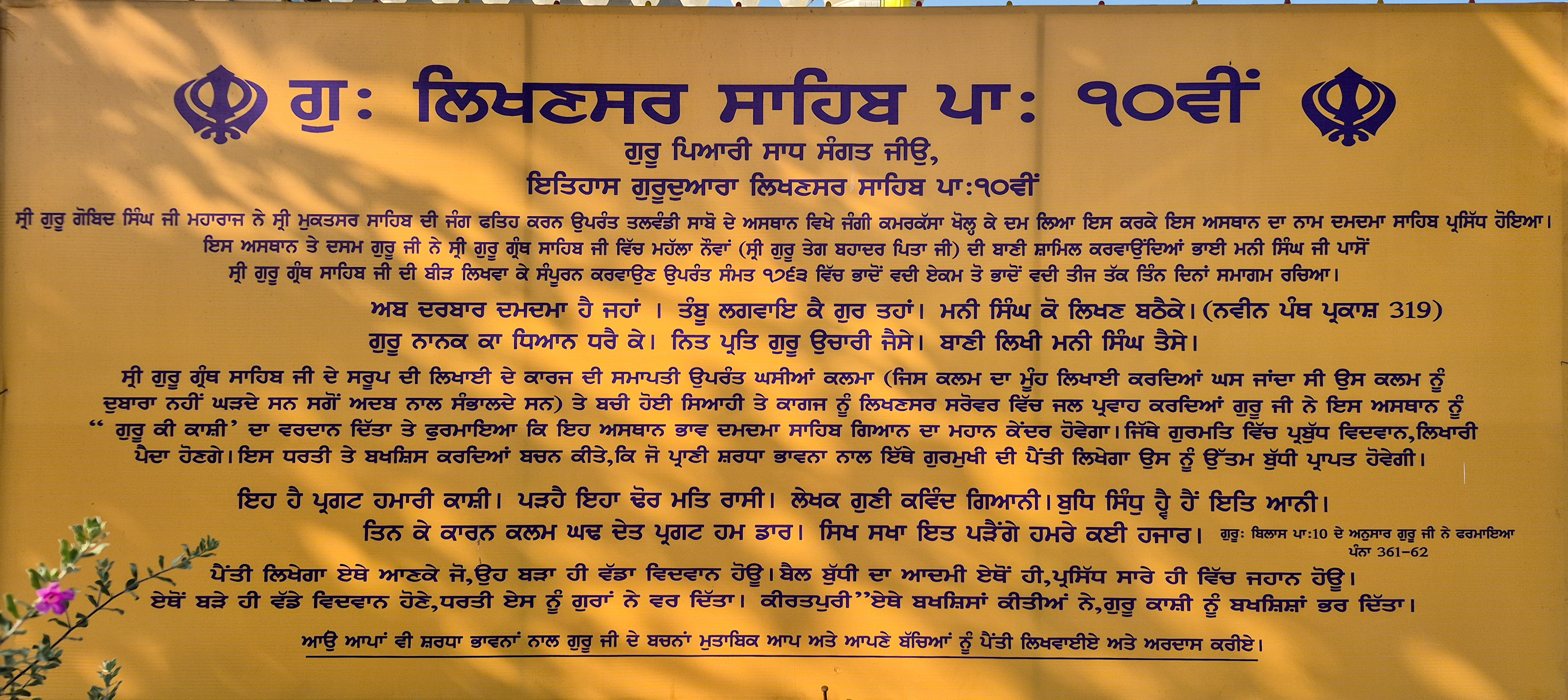
Gurdwara Likhansar Sahib brief history
