= Gurusar Sahib =

Gurdwara in Punjab, India

Coordinates: 30°50′27″N 76°06′23″E

Gurdwara Gurusar Sahib
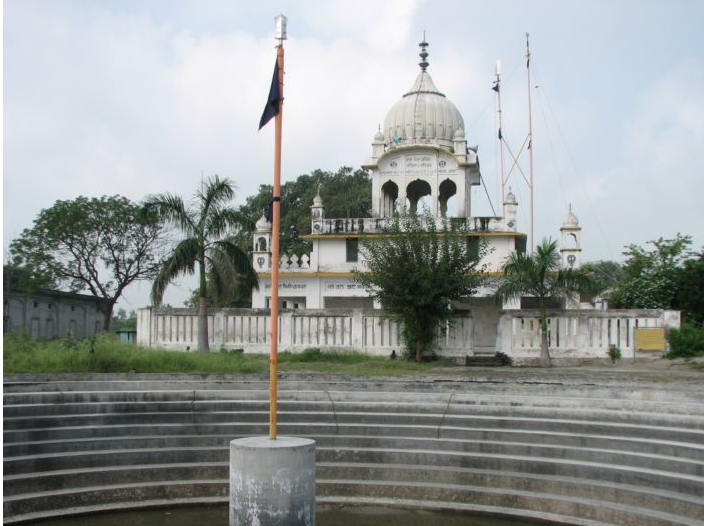
- Gurudwara Gurusar Sahib

Religion
- Affiliation: Sikhism
- District: Ludhiana

Location
- Location: Lal Kalan
- State: Punjab
- Country: India
- Interactive map of Gurdwara Gurusar Sahib

Architecture
- Type: Gurdwara
- Style: Sikh architecture

Gurdwara Gurusar Sahib (Punjabi: ਗੁਰਦੁਆਰਾ ਗੁਰੂਸਰ ਸਾਹਿਬ ਲੱਲ ਕਲਾਂ ( ਲੁਧਿ: ) ਪਾਤਸ਼ਾਹੀ ਛੇਵੀਂ ਅਤੇ ਪਾਤਸ਼ਾਹੀ ਦਸਵੀਂ) - a shrine which commemorates visit of Guru Hargobind Sahib and Guru Gobind Singh. Gurudwara Gurusar Sahib is located in village Lal Kalan (Ldh), Lal Kalan is a village near Neelon Bridge, Sirhind Canal; on Chandigarh-Ludhiana Road. Gurudwara Sahib, inside a walled compound has an octagonal shaped room, with the sanctum in the middle. Over the sanctum on the first floor there is a low domed room built in the same style. At Gurudwara Gurusar Sahib there is Sarovar, Beri Sahib and Barota Sahib with their own importance.

== History of Gurudwara Gurusar Sahib ==
=== Guru Hargobind Sahib ===
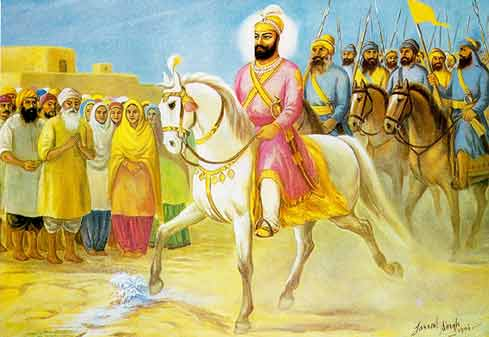

Guru Hargobind Sahib- (True Emperor") the sixth guru of Sikhism came here on 19 Faghan 1675. Guru Sahib had 7 cannons and 1100 horse riders; 52 kings with them, whom were released with a special apron having 52 strings (known as 52 Kalian wala Jaaman) attached to it worn by Guru Hargobind Sahib. At this place, all of the kings asked for Guru Hargobind Sahib permission to leave and Guru told them to leave and take their responsibility. But one king (Hast Lal) from all of them, thought in his mind to get married in this village only. Guru Hargobind Sahib after knowing his mind's thought, asked 'sangat' if anyone wishes to marry his daughter. Then One Ramdasia Sikh from village Lal Kalan was ready to marry her daughter and seeking permission from Guru Sahib. Guru Hargobind Sahib performed 'Anand karj' of King Hast Lal and daughter of Ramdasia Sikh with their own hands. After marriage Guru Sahib told King Hast Lal, that he can't stay in this village as he was now son-in-law of this village, so King Hast Lal stayed in village Balala (2 km from Lal kalan) and he was famous with name 'Baba Hast Lal'.

=== Guru Gobind Singh ===
Guru Gobind Singh - the tenth guru of sikhism came here on 11 Poh 1761. Guru Gobind Singh along with Bhai Daya Singh, Bhai Dharam Singh, Bhai Maan Singh, Bhai Ghani Khan, Bhai Nabi Khan reached Village Lal Kalan when coming from Macchiwara Sahib after becoming 'Ucch Da Peer' and had taken rest below Beri Sahib which is still present there at Gurudwara Gurusar Sahib. After leaving this shrine Guru Gobind Singh went towards Gurudwara Degsar Sahib (Katana Sahib), where they were stopped by Sayyid Pir Muhammad, Guru Gobind Singh followers assured the chief of Muslim forces that the person in the palanquin was 'Uchch Da Peer', but chief was not satisfied. He invited the 'Peer' (Guru) and his followers for food, thinking Sikhs would not dine with Muslims. But Guru said that he was on a long fast and sent two Sikhs Bhai Daya Singh and Bhai Mani Singh to take food after offering it to Holy Kirpan (a small sword). Next morning they were allowed to resume their journey.

== Important places at Gurusar Sahib ==
=== Beri Sahib ===
Beri Sahib to which Guru Hargobind Sahib tied his horse. A person suffering from leprosy was staying near by in a small house. He requested Guru Hargobind Sahib to cure him, Guru Sahib told him to put foam coming out from horse mouth on all of his body and take bath in the pond (sarovar) nearer to Beri Sahib. After bath, he was cured. At present time, if anyone having skin disease take bath here, then he/she get relieved from skin diseases. Guru Gobind Singh had taken rest below Beri Sahib which is still present there at Gurudwara Gurusar Sahib.

=== Barota Sahib ===
Guru Hargobind Sahib said to sangat present at that time- "This tree (Barota in Punjabi) is Mango (Amb in Punjabi) tree", but sangat said it's 'Borh', Guru said it again but again sangat did not agree. So the leaves of Barota Sahib are like Mango tree leaves because of Guru Sahib aphorism.
