= Gurdwara Nanaklama =

Gurdwara in Sikkim, India

Gurudwara Nanak Lama Chungthang
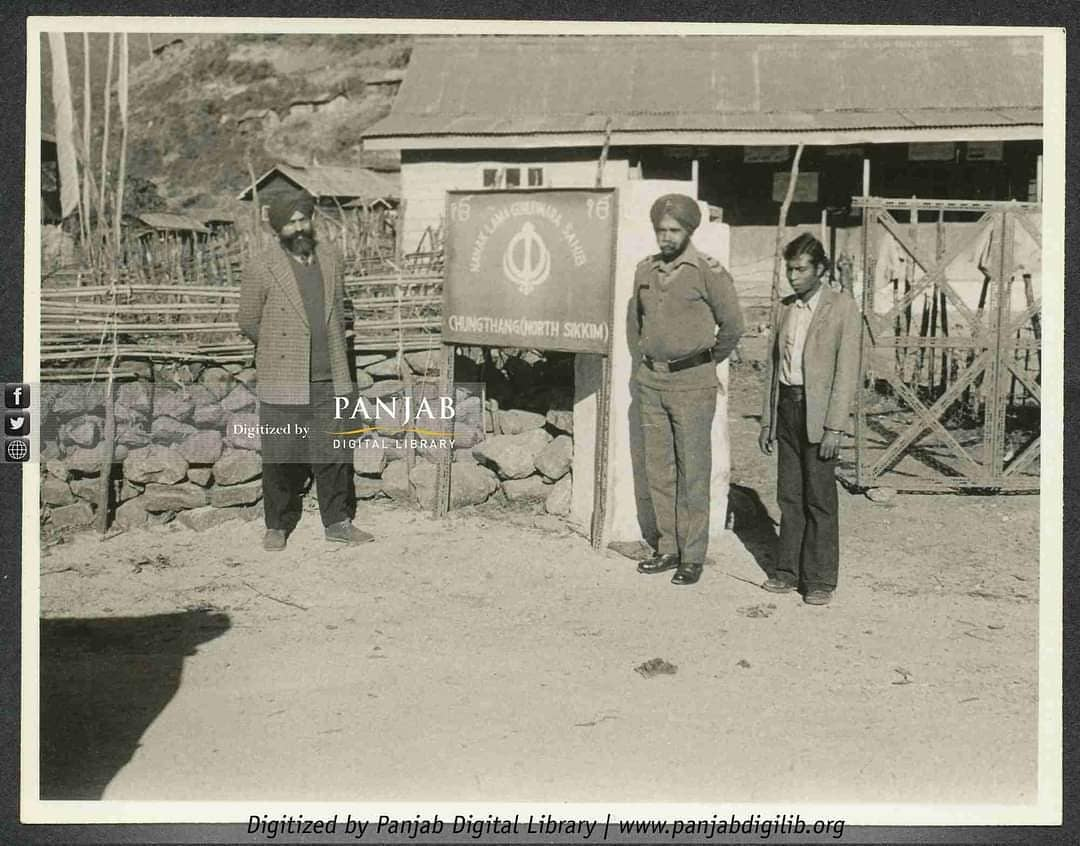
- Gurudwara Nanaklama Sahib. Digitized by Panjab Digital Library.
- Interactive map of the Gurudwara Nanak Lama Chungthang area

General information
- Coordinates: 27.603933°N 88.6439807°E

Website
- web.archive.org/web/20110203162703/http://gurudwarananaklamasahib.com/

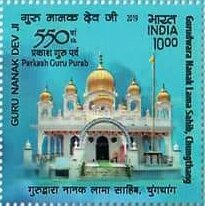
Gurdwara Nanak Lama Sahib on Postage stamps of India

Gurudwara Nanaklama is a historical gurudwara situated in Chungthang.

== History ==
In 1969 Assam Rifles, with the help of Tasa Tangey Lepcha, the then MLA of the region, built a small gurudwara in remembrance of the first Sikh Guru, Guru Nanak, who visited this place in his Third Udasi. Now management the gurudwara path rattan baba harbans singh ji baba bachan singh ji baba surinder singh ji dera kar sewa gurudwara bangla sahib gurudwara built near Chungthang, Sikkim by members of the Assam Rifles Battalion under Subedar Major Bhullar.
