= Gurdwara Sri Guru Singh Sabha (Greater Kailash) =

Gurdwara in Delhi, India

Gurdwara Sri Guru Singh Sabha (Pahari Wala)

Religion
- Affiliation: Sikhism

Location
- Location: Greater Kailash 1, New Delhi, India
- Interactive map of Gurdwara Sri Guru Singh Sabha (Pahari Wala)
- Coordinates: 28.5521°N 77.2384°E

Architecture
- Style: Sikh architecture

Gurdwara Sri Guru Singh Sabha is a Sikh gurdwara, or Sikh house of worship, in Delhi, India. It is also known as the Gurdwara Pahari Wala or Pahariwala Gurdwara.

It is located in Greater Kailash part 1. It is near Guru Harkrishan Public School, approximately 2 km away from Kailash Colony Metro Station.

This gurdwara offers a banquet hall that can be booked for special occasions.

The gurdwara embodies the values of community service and compassion central to the Sikh faith. The Mata Gujri Medical Centre functions under the guidance and patronage of Gurdwara Sri Guru Singh Sabha providing healthcare services.

Another Gurdwara Sri Guru Singh Sabha (Greater Kailash 2) with the same name exists in Greater Kailash 2.

== History ==
It was founded in the early 1960s by the local community on public land. The Mata Gujri school and dispensary were added later.
