= Naulakha, Punjab =

Naulakha
- Village
- Location within Punjab Location within India
- Coordinates: 30.53°N 76.39°E
- Country: India
- State: Punjab
- District: Fatehgarh Sahib
- Established: 600 years ago

Government
  - Body: Panchayat
- Elevation: 264 m (866 ft)
- Time zone: UTC+5:30 (IST)
- PIN: 147104
- Telephone: 91-01763

Naulakha is a major village in Fatehgarh Sahib District, in the Indian state of Punjab.

It is situated on Sirhind-Patiala road, 13 km from Sirhind and 19 km from Patiala. It is a historic village. Guru Tegh Bahadur ji, the ninth guru of Sikhs, and Mata Gujri ji are two of the most well-known visitors. Today, Gurudwara Naulakha Sahib is built on the site where they once stayed.

The village has a population of about 1000. The three schools in the village are the "Govt. Primary School", "Govt. Middle School" and a private convent school named "Baba Zoravar Singh Baba Fateh Singh, Sen. Sec. Public School, Naulakha", also known as "B.Z.S.F.S School". A mosque is also present in the village.

The village has a "cooperative society" from where farmers can buy or hire anything related to agriculture.

== History ==
The name of the village is based on an event said to have taken place when Guru Tegh Bahadur and Mata Gujri stayed there for a day and night on a tour of the Malwa region. A man named Lakhi Shah Wanjara who had lost his ox said that he would give several takkas to the guru if it were found. When he found the ox, he approached the guru and gave him nine takkas. When the guru forwarded these to the Sangat without even touching them, Wanjara feared that the amount of the offering had been insufficient and told the guru that while he didn't have any more money on that day he would try to give more soon. The guru told the man that his nine takkas were the equivalent of nine lakhs of takka (nau lakh). He asked visitors who came to him later to name the village Naulakha in remembrance of the offering.

== Sports ==
Naulakha village is known for its enthusiastic support of sports. It has a sports club, founded in 1990, named "Sri Guru Tegh Bahadur Sports Club". Recently the President of this sports Club is "Gurdeep Singh Kharoud". The village is well known for its outstanding volleyball team which has won many tournaments throughout Punjab and Haryana. The Cricket team of the village is also famous, having won several tournaments. The club organised many volleyball and cricket competitions.

== Places ==
- Gurudwara Naulakha Sahib
- Mosque
- Baba Veergar
- Baba Matt
- Lalan wala Peer
- Nagar Kheda
- Guga Maadi
- Bhagatan di Motor
- Wifi chownk
- Water Tank park

== Administration ==
The village is administrated by "Village Panchayat". Gurudwara Naulakha Sahib is administrated by "local gurdwara parbandhak committee" under SGPC.
