= Gurdwara Koohni Sahib =

Gurdwara in Chandigarh, India

Shri Koohni Sahib is a Gurdwara in Manimajra, a small town in Chandigarh, India. The Gurudwara is located at approximately a kilometer's distance from the famous Mata Mansa Devi Mandir, a Hindu temple. Situated in Bhainsa Tiba village in Mani Majra.

== History ==
Guru Gobind Singh came to Shri Koohni Sahib from Narainpur in 1746 (Vikram Samvat) on the request of a Brahmin girl named Anpurna who worshiped Guru Sahib. Guru Gobind Singh meditated here for 17 pahar. While staying here, Anpurna served Guru Sahib and his accompanying sangat with food. Seeing this Guru Sahib blessed her that a temple on her name will be built here before the Gurudwara and whosoever will come here with true devotion, his wishes will come true.
