= Gurdwara Toka Sahib =

Gurdwara in Haryana, India

Gurdwara Toka Sahib is an historical Sikh shrine located at Toka village, near Naraingarh in Haryana. This holy shrine had presence of Guru Gobind Singh Ji before Battle of Bhangani fought between Akal Fauj and Bhim Chand and other hilly rulers. The Horses had a rest at this place while they were later found at Laha, 8 kilometers away. Gurudwara also has a well (groundwater) named after Ahluwalia Rulers who won Sirmaur and Naraingarh province in late 19th century. Holy shrine traces its way via Naraingarh, Kullarpur,Ferozpur and Toka. In 1688, Guru Gobind Singh visited this area from his way from Paunta Sahib to Anandpur Sahib. Lieutenant Fateh Singh served as president of place for 13 years.
