= Gurudwara Khalsa Sabha, Matunga =

Gurdwara in Maharastra, India

Gurudwara Khalsa Sabha also known as Khalsa Sabha, Matunga is a Gurudwara in Matunga Road, Mumbai. It is adjacent Guru Nanak High School, Mahim sharing common compound. It is located behind the City Light Cinema, Guru Nanak Marg, in Matunga Road
