= Gurdwara Dam Dama Sahib =

Gurdwara in New Delhi, India

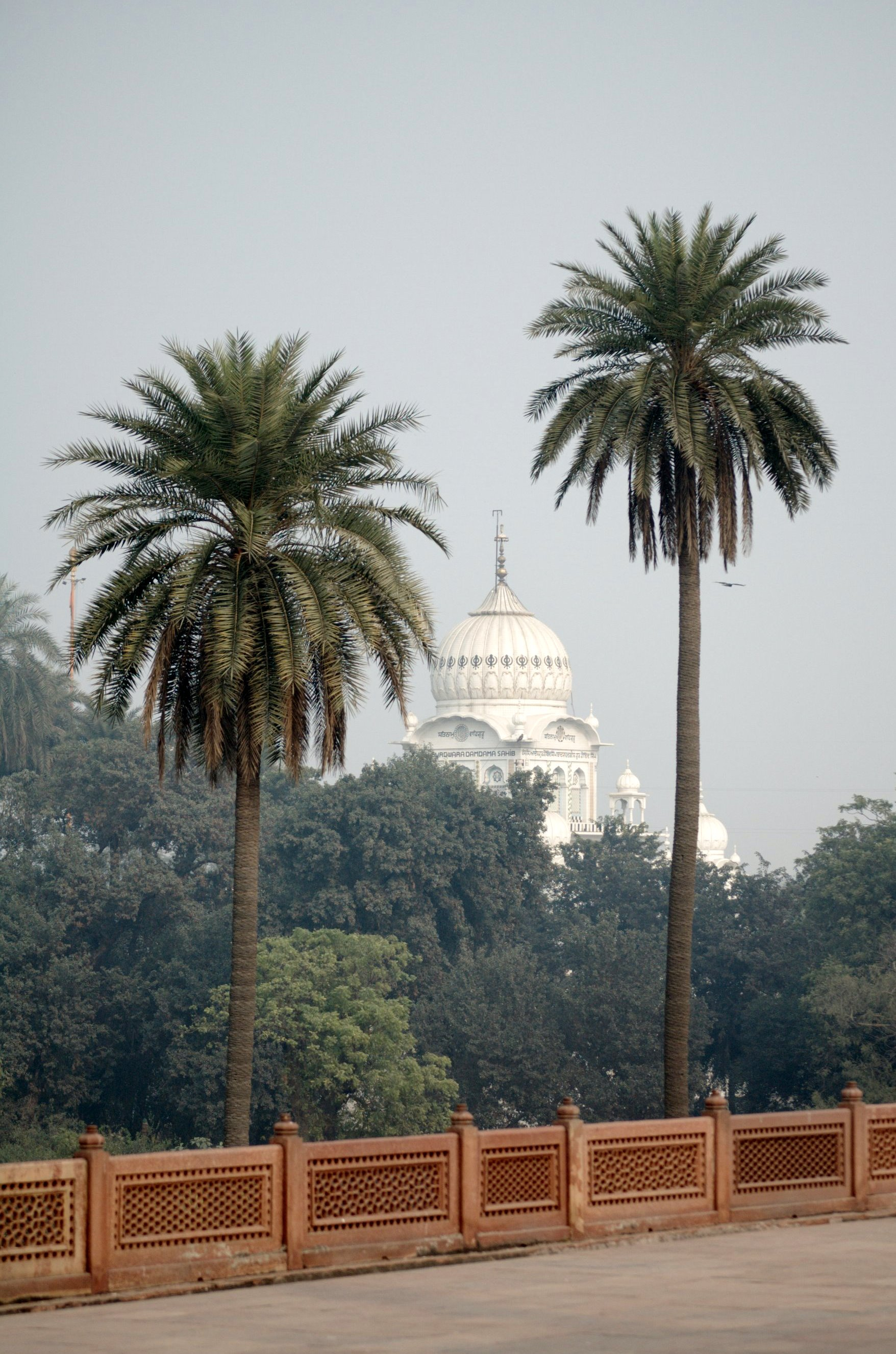
- Gurdwara Dam Dama Sahib, Delhi, as seen from the terrace of Humayun's tomb

Religion
- Affiliation: Sikhism

Location
- Location: Outer Ring Road, New Delhi, India.
- Interactive map of Gurdwara Dam Dama Sahib

Architecture
- Style: Sikh architecture
- Founder: Baghel Singh
- Completed: 1664 as a bungalow, again rebuilt in 1783, current structure mostly built post 1947

Gurdwara Damdama Sahib is a gurdwara (Sikh place of worship) located near Humayun's Tomb on the Outer Ring Road in New Delhi, India.

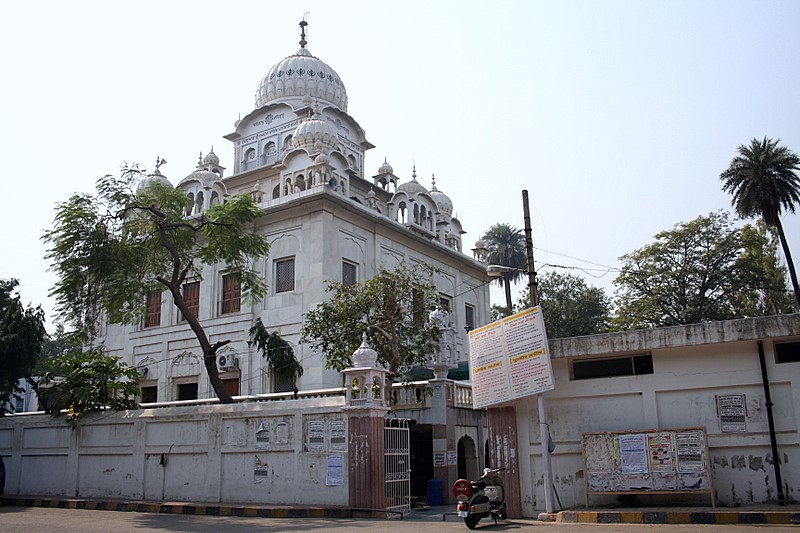
Gurudwara Dumdama Sahib as seen from road

== History ==
This gurdwara is associated with the Tenth Sikh Guru, Guru Gobind Singh. It commemorates his meeting with Prince Muazzam, later Emperor Bahadur Shah, in 1707. The prince had asked him for help in the prince's battle for succession for the throne with his brother, after the death of Aurangzeb. Guru Sahib met the Prince near Humayun's Tomb, and together they drew up their strategy for battle. They watched elephant and bull fights organized for their entertainment. Guru Sahib promised to help the Prince if he would punish all those responsible for the treacherous killing of his sons and destroying his army and his city, Anandpur. Later, Guru Sahib helped the Prince defeat his brother and claim the throne.

Gurdwara Damdama Sahib (place of rest) was first built by Sardar Baghel Singh in 1783, when a huge Sikh army under his command conquered Delhi. At first it was a small Gurdwara. Later Maharaja Ranjit Singh delegated his officials to renovate the Gurdwara. Consequently, a deorhi (Sikh architectural structure) was constructed, including buildings for priests and pilgrims. In 1984, a new building was constructed. Every year, thousands of devotees assemble here to celebrate the festival called Hola Mohalla.
