= Parivar Vichora =

Gurdwara in Punjab, India

Parivar Vichora Guruduara
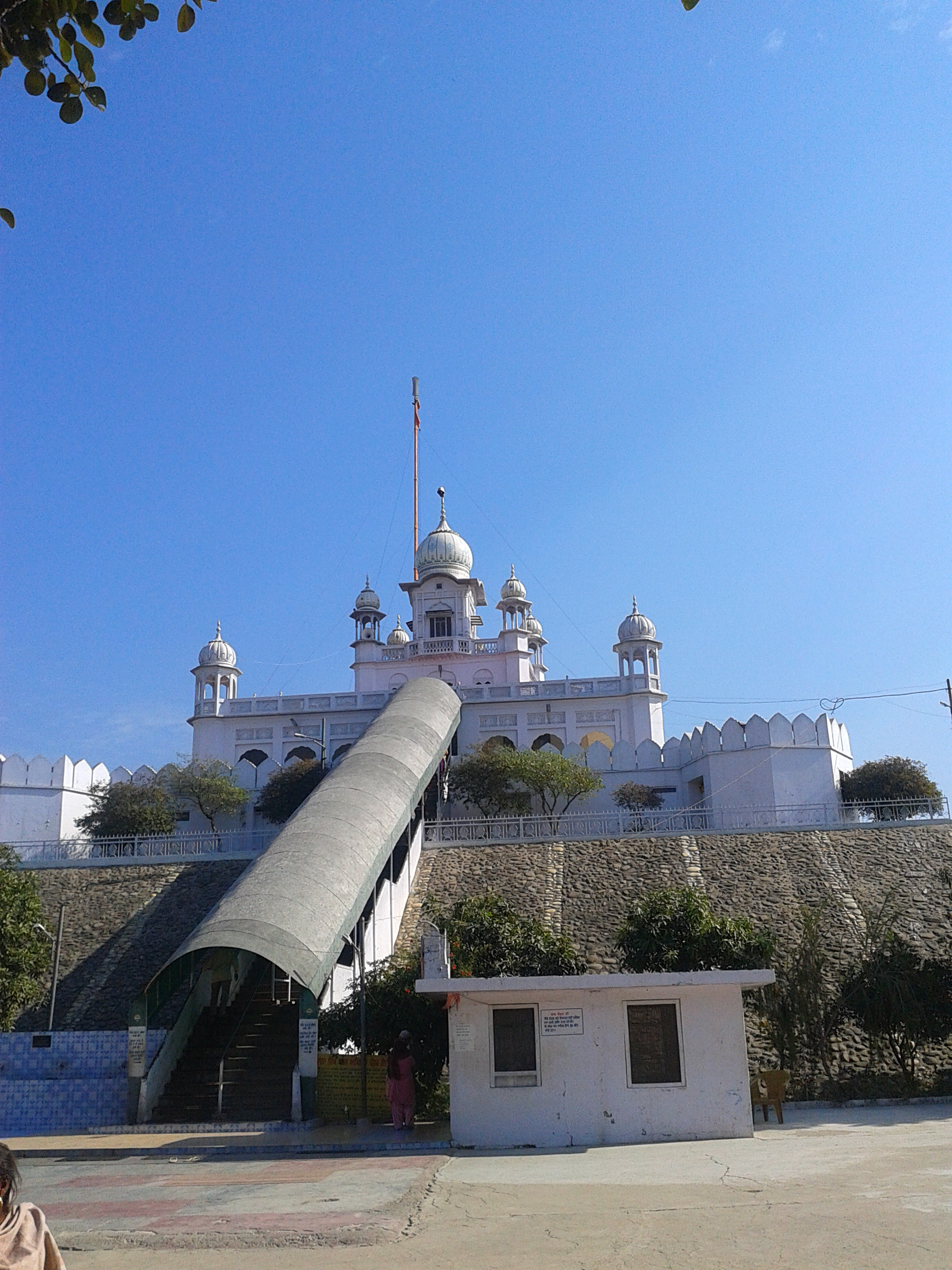
- Parivar Vichora Guruduara
- Interactive map of the Parivar Vichora Guruduara area

General information
- Location: Majri, Rupnagar
- Coordinates: 31.0598976°N 76.5903081°E

Parivar Vichora is a Gurdwara situated on the bank of the river Sirsa in India. This is where the 10th Guru of Sikh, Guru Gobind SIngh Ji's, family got separated.

== History ==
This Gurdwara Sahib signifies the tragic happenings that followed the evacuation of Anandpur Sahib by Guru Gobind Singh during the night of 5–6 December 1705 after agreement was reached between the Sikhs and the Mughal authorities. The Mughal army commander had promised to allow the Sikhs to leave the fort unharmed. On the morning of 6 December 1705, the Guru arrived at this place by the river Sirsa and decided to make a brief halt for the morning religious congregation. However, chaos soon ensued on religious grounds, and the Sikhs and Mughals engaged in battle. The Sikhs found that the Sirsa river was flooded and swollen by the monsoon rains.

Afterwards, Guru Gobind Singh divided his columns into two. While the part of the force was to engage against the enemy, the others were ordered to get across the river. The Guru followed by a small party of Sikhs, rode their horses into the swollen stream with swords in their hands. The Guru along with his four sons and 50 followers and ladies of the home reached the other bank. Many Sikhs died crossing the river. In the chaos two younger sons of the Guru along with their grandmother, got separated.

Though some Sikhs got safely across the river, Guru Gobind Singh's family got split and were no longer together. There was no time to look for the missing as the army was close by. The Guru with his two elder sons and 40 Sikhs marched towards Chamkaur. Mata Sahib Kaur escorted by few Sikhs reached Delhi, while his aged mother and two younger sons were escorted by a servant Gangu to his village in Morinda. Later, Sant Baba Kartar Singh Ji Bhairomajre Wale divulged this place and initiated the kar-sewa.

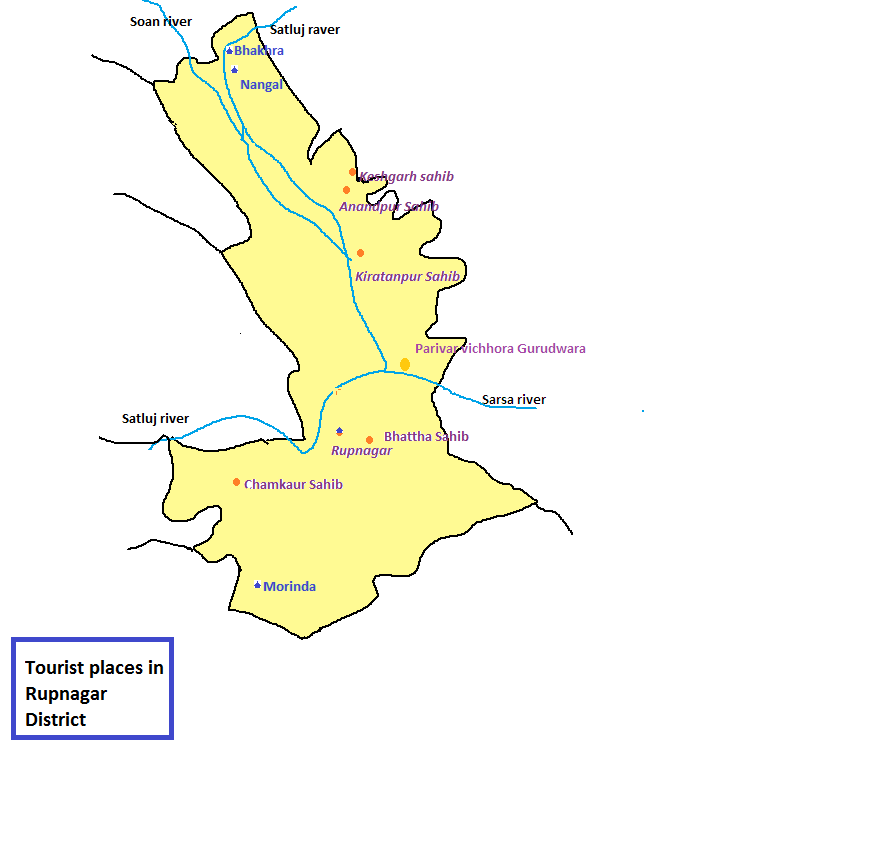
Location of Gurudwara Parivar Vichhora in Rupnagar District

== Location ==
The Gurdwara is on a hill top, and commands a panoramic view of the surrounding valley. It is situated near the bank of river Sirsa in the village Majri, Rupnagar, Punjab 140114. At this holy spot Gurudwara Parivar Vichhora, was built by grateful devotees of the great Guru. It marks the place where the Guru's family was separated from the main body of the Sikhs.
