= Guru Ka Tal =

Sikh pilgrimage place in Agra, Uttar Pradesh

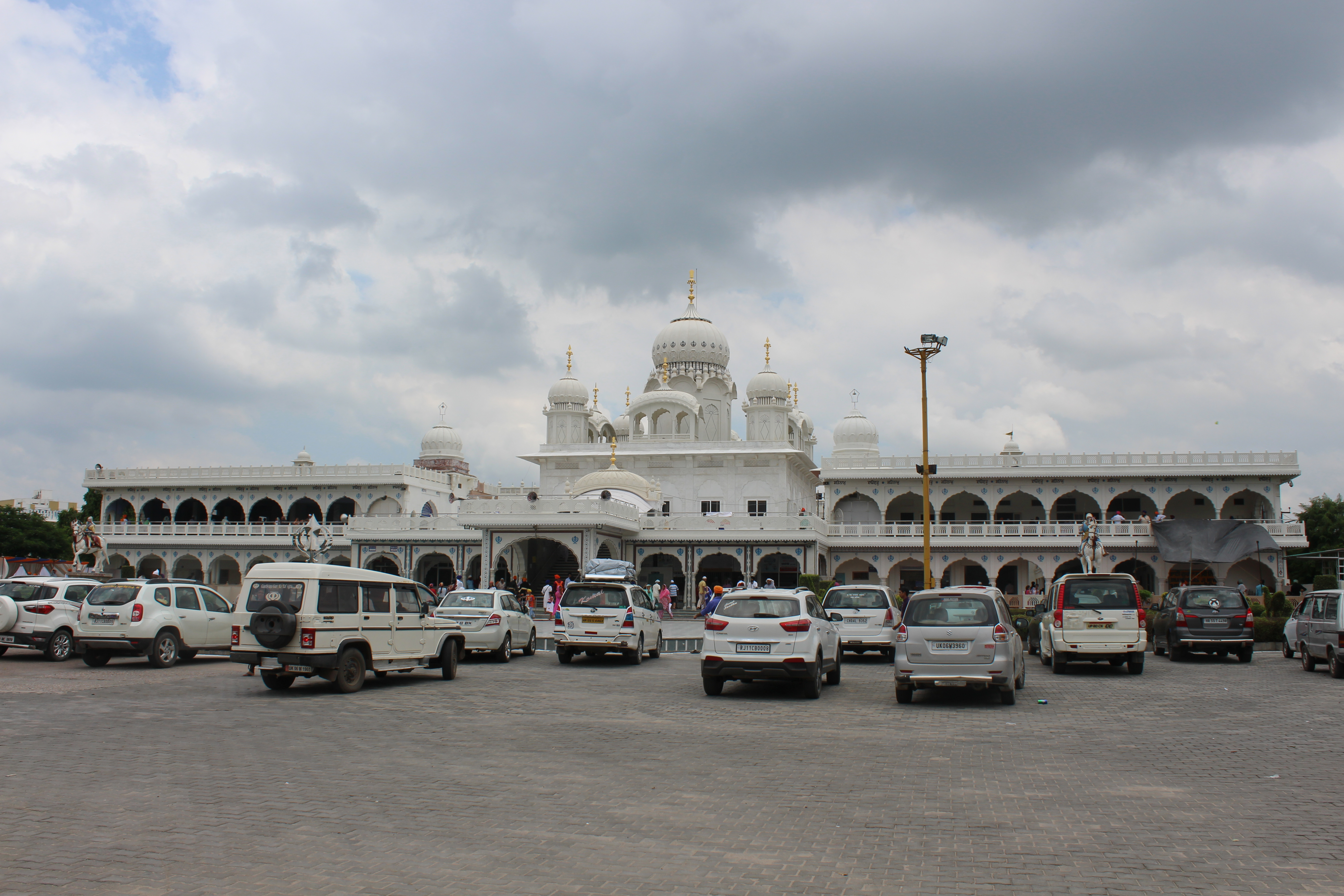
Guru ka Tal

Guru ka Tal is a historical Sikh pilgrimage place dedicated to the memory of ninth Guru Sri Guru Tegh Bahudar Ji. Guru ka Taal is near Sikandra, in Agra. The Gurudwara was built over the place where the Guru Tegh Bahadur offered voluntary arrest to Aurangazeb, the Mughal Emperor. Several devotees gather every year to pay homage to the great Sikh guru (who was martyred along with his followers for sake of freedom to practice one's faith) in this Gurudwara.

== History ==
This historic structure dates back to the 17th century. Earlier it was a Taal (reservoir) in the area near Sikandra. It was built in 1610 AD to collect and conserve rainwater in Agra during Jehangir reign. The water of the reservoir was used for irrigation purposes during the dry season. The reservoir was ornamented with stone carvings. This is said to be the place where the Guru Tegh Bahadur laid down his arms to offer arrest to Aurangazeb. The Gurudwara called Guru Ka Taal was built in the 1970s due to the contributions and arduous efforts of Sant Baba Sadhu Singhji "Mauni".

== Architecture ==
There were twelve towers in the Tal, but only eight towers have survived the test of time and have now been retrieved. This red stone structure bears similarity to many other magnificent structures of the Mughals, like the Agra Fort, Fatehpur Sikri, etc.

== See also ==
- Taj Mahal
- Agra Fort
