= Bhai Maharaj Singh =

Sikh saint and anti-colonial resistance fighter

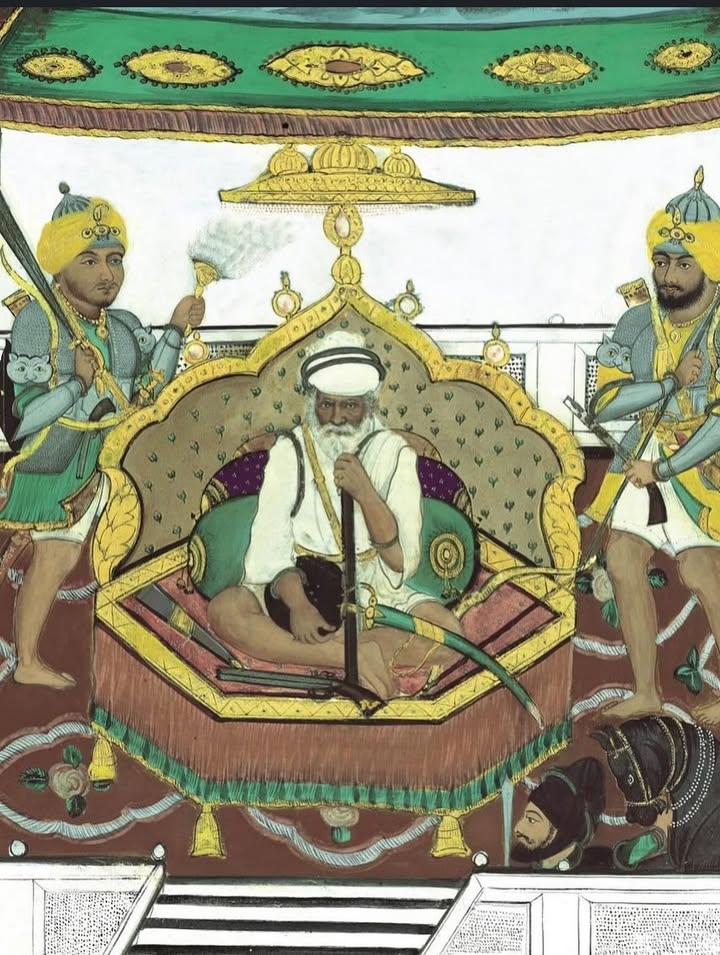
- Painting of Bhai Maharaj Singh, holding durbar (court)

Mahant of the Naurangabad Dera
- In office 1844 – 1856

Bhai Daya Singh Samparda
- Preceded by: Baba Bir Singh (Naurangabad)
- Succeeded by: Baba Ram Singh 'Virakt' (Naurangabad)

Personal life
- Born: Nihal Singh Rabbon Uchi, Ludhiana district, Punjab
- Died: 5 July 1856 Outram Prison, Singapore
- Cause of death: Throat cancer
- Children: Nanak Singh (son)
- Known for: Early Sikh anti-colonial resistance fighter; Head of Bhai Daya Singh ji Samparda; Sikh saint

Religious life
- Religion: Sikhism
- Lineage: Dera of Bhai Bir Singh Naurangabad (Bhai Daya Singh ji Samparda)
- Dharma name: Bhagvan Singh

Bhai Maharaj Singh (disputed – 5 July 1856 (Note: Of the sources which give a date of birth, one states 13th of January 1780 whilst the second gives a date of 3rd of January 1770.)) was a prominent Sikh saint-soldier (sant-sipahi) turned revolutionary anti-colonial resistance fighter of the early British colonial establishment in Punjab. He is also remembered as the first Sikh in Singapore on record, having been exiled there as punishment in the latter part of his life. Bhai Maharaj Singh succeeded Baba Bir Singh (Naurangabad) of Bhai Daya Singh Samparda. He was part of the bhai tradition of Sikhism. At his height, he had tens of thousands of followers and was a charismatic leader who was seen in a prophetic manner, being viewed as a figure to the Sikhs akin to Jesus Christ to the Christians. He was influential in Majha, Doaba, and Malwa. He is connected to the Hoti Mardan Vali Sant Khalsa Sampardai, established by Bhai Daya Singh.

== Names ==
His birth name was Nihal Singh. His Khalsa name after undergoing the Amrit Sanchar ceremony was Bhagvan Singh. His sobriquet was Maharaj Singh. He was also known as the "Karniwala" (miracle worker or possessor of supernatural powers) or "Guru" (spiritual leader; often spelt as Gooroo archaically). (Note: The word is alternative transcribed as 'Karniwala'.) Posthumously, he became known as Karam Singh amongst the local Singaporeans, theorized to derive from the Karniwala appellation as a diminutive form.

== Early life ==
He was born as Nihal Singh in Rabbon Uchi village (Raboo, Nagar Maloud; located in present-day Ludhiana district) in the latter half of the 18th century. His exact date of birth has been claimed to be 3 January 1770 or 13 January 1780 according to different sources. His father's name has been identified as either being Kesar Singh or Gurmukh Singh. Maharaj Singh had two brothers, named Gurdial Singh and Gurbakhash Singh, respectively.

He was a religiously inclined individual with a patient demeanor. His father would send him to a Sikh seminary so that he would be instructed on Gurbani and Gurmukhi. However, the teacher at the seminary saw promise in the young Maharaj Singh so he was advised to be sent to the Dera of Bhai Tota Singh Thikriwala. Tota Singh was a Nirmala ascetic.

He was educated in the dera (sanctuary) of Bhai Tota Singh in Thikriwala during his formative years. At that dera, he learnt about Sikh history, scripture, and philosophy (including traditional Sikh political philosophies). Through this education he obtained a firm grasp of the Guru Granth Sahib (gurbani) learnt the Gurmukhi script. The deras of his era would produce Sikh saint-warriors through their educational methodologies. According to some sources, he may have taken Amrit during his time at Bhai Tota Singh Thikriwala's dera. He would immerse himself in Naam Simran meditation as a daily routine. He studied the Vedas and the Sikh primary canon, the Guru Granth Sahib.

Whilst he was a student at the dera of Bhai Tota Singh, a Sikh saint known as Baba Bir Singh of Naurangabad would hold a katha (discourse) session in the village Maharaj Singh was living in at the time. Maharaj Singh was present at this discourse given by Bir Singh. After the meeting with Bir Singh, he became impressed by the religious leader's doctrines. He eventually came to know about Bir Singh of Naurangabad's dera and set-off to join it. His interest in Bir Singh's dera was elicited due to discovering how concepts of Sikh statecraft, Sikh vows, and seva, were heavily mentored there.

== Religious career ==
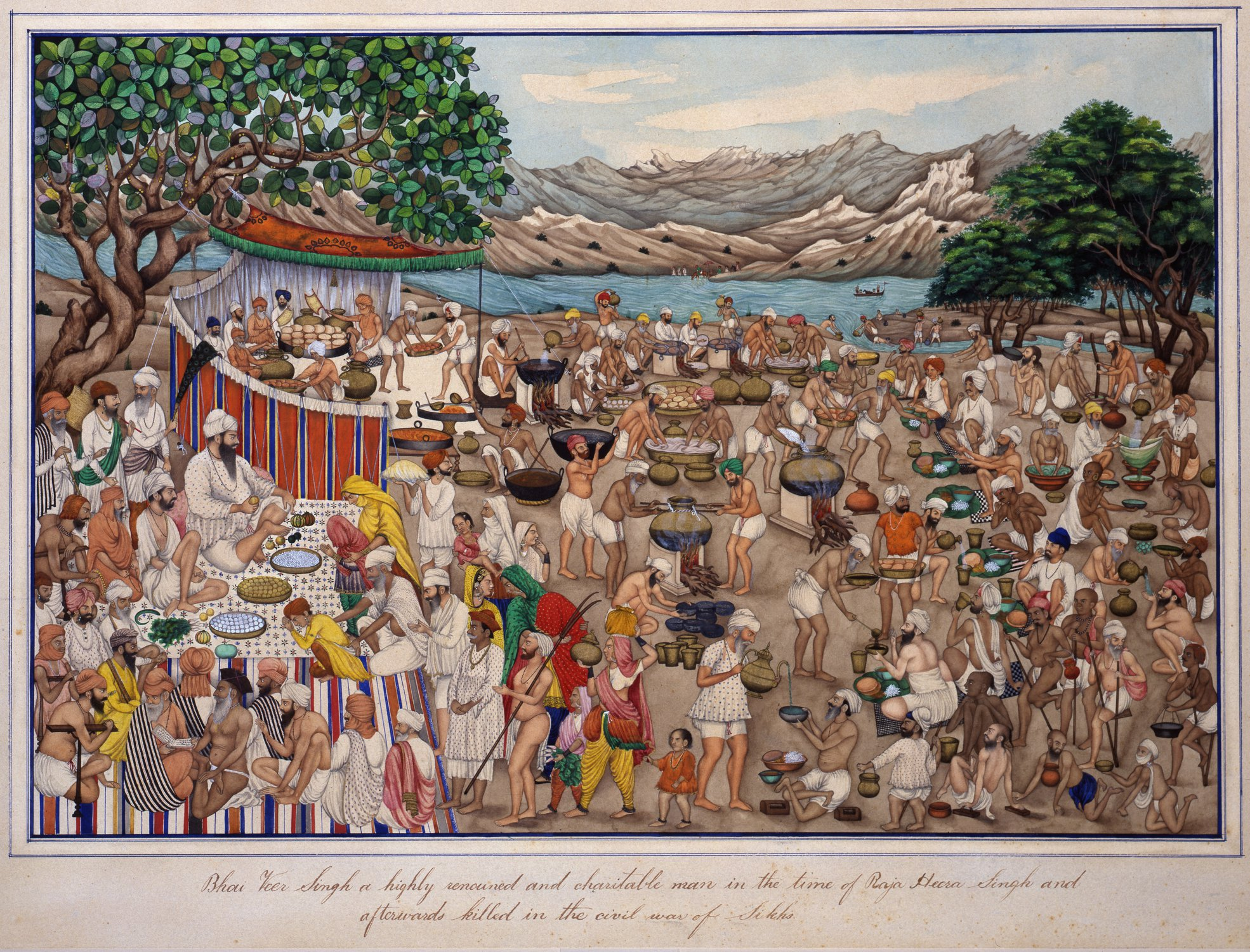
The camp of Baba Bir Singh Naurangabad, Punjab, ca.1850, Kapany Collection. The person seated immediately beside Bir Singh may be Bhai Maharaj Singh.

He eventually became associated with the dera set-up by Baba Bir Singh, located in Naurangabad (located in present-day Tarn Taran district), after being impressed by Bir Singh. Many miracles are associated with his stay at Bir Singh's dera. His time at the dera was occupied by seva and serving in the langar (communal kitchen). Thousands of devotees would visit the dera and Maharaj Singh was responsible for cooking food to provide the langar meals for all of these people, a responsibility he undertook as the head chef. Local resident, Gurpratap Singh, claim he served as a volunteer in the langar kitchen full of pyaar. After undergoing the Pahul ceremony, he was rechristened with the Khalsa name of Bhagvan Singh. (Note: This name is alternatively spelt as 'Bhagwan'.) He rose-up to eventually becoming one of the most entrusted disciples of Bir Singh.

His master, Bir Singh, gave him the following words of advice during his Amrit Sanchar ceremony:

By taking Amrit you are taking a vow that hereafter you will dedicate each breath of your life in the service of Satguru. In other words, you will live every moment of your life according to the injunctions of Satguru. If your mind always stays alert according to Guru's instructions then your heart and thoughts will stay free from getting polluted. Gradually your mind will become immaculately clean and you will be able to perceive the presence of Akal Purakh within.

— Bir Singh Naurangabad, translated by Harjinder Singh of the Sikh Research Institute

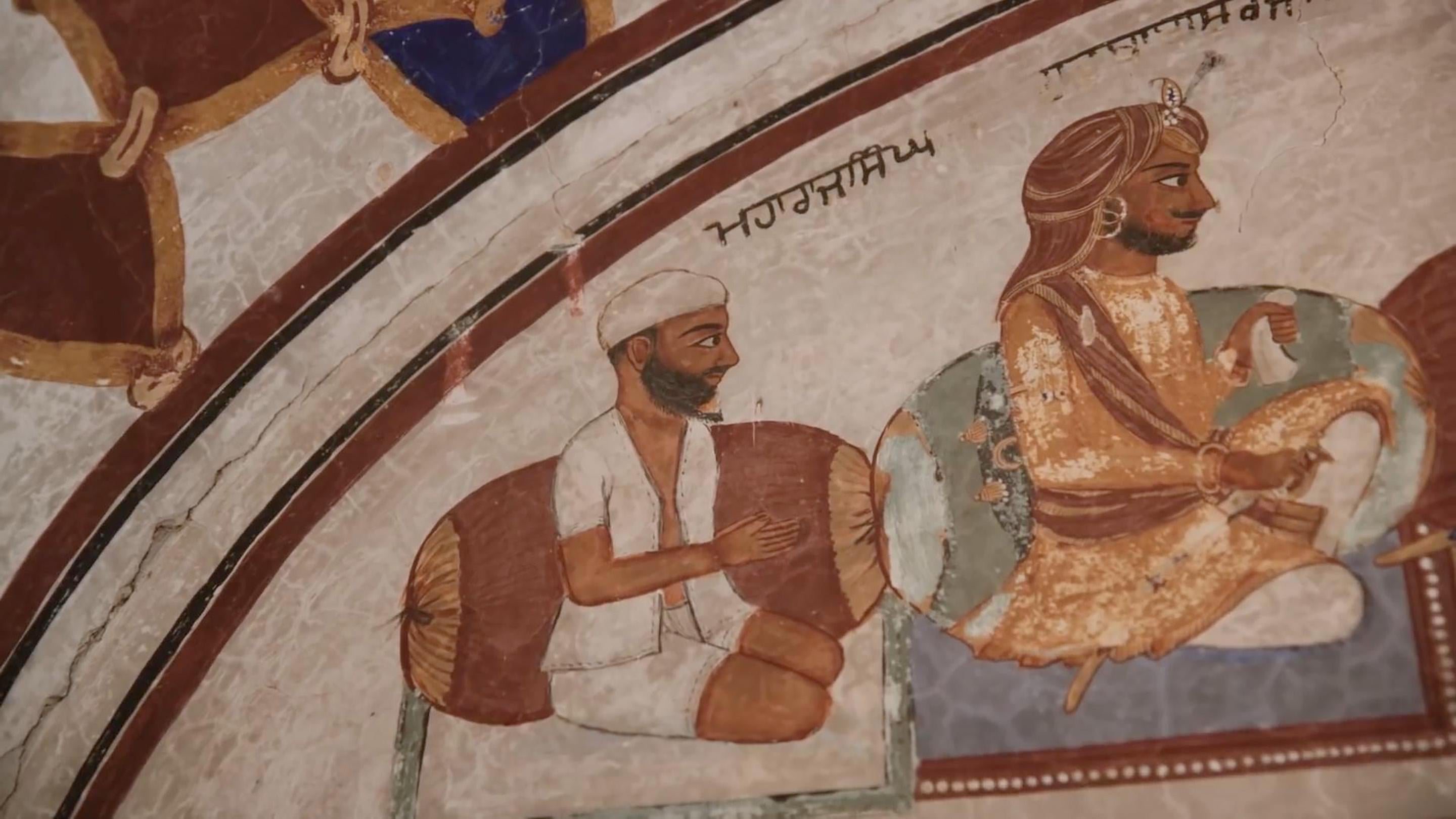
Mural depicting Bhai Maharaj Singh (left) and Baba Suraj Singh (right) from a Sikh temple (Gurdwara Baba Bir Singh) at Naurangabad, Punjab

He started to become known as "Maharaj Singh" because he had a habit of referring to everyone, no matter who they wore and their status, as maharaj, in-order to humble himself, which ironically earned the appellation for himself in the mouths of others. Eventually his prior names of Nihal and Bhagvan were forgotten and people just referred to him as Maharaj. Every time he would give food to a pilgrim, he would say "take maharaj".

He learnt about the Sikh concepts of miri-piri during his time at the Naurangabad Dera. He was personally mentored by Bir Singh. Harjinder Singh describes the Naurangabad Dera as a "seminary-like space" and as a "theo-political training center where the culture of Nam prevailed".

Maharaj Singh would bring Bir Singh water during the hours of amrit vela at 3:00 a.m. for Ishnan (holy bath) every day. He also volunteered his labour preparing and cooking meals for the langar of the Dera, which would feel thousands of visitors daily.

Bir Singh would later send Maharaj Singh to Amritsar, where he make a base of operations at Samdu Ka Talab. There he would be joined by Ram Singh (later Guru of the Namdhari sect), another aspiring disciple of Bir Singh. Both of them would travel around Punjab and raise awareness about the plight of Sikh sovereignty and the danger of losing it. They wanted to protect the future of the Sikh Empire, which had been embroiled in a precarious state. Maharaj Singh would train his disciples by enacting artificial warfare and field training exercises, similar to what occurs at the Hola Mohalla festivals of the present-day.

When Bir Singh died on 7 May 1844, after being killed in an attack on his dera led by the Dogra faction of the Lahore Durbar, Maharaj Singh became the next mahant (leader) of the group due to his high-repute among members of the dera. Maharaj Singh had been present when his master was killed in the attack on the dera. Amardeep Madra argues that the death of his master in this attack may have influenced Maharaj Singh's direction in life towards revolution and confrontation of those he perceived as enemies of the survival of the Sikh state. At-first the council of the dera had decided to pass on the mantle of leadership to another member named Khuda Singh, but Khuda was full of humility and was humble and therefore suggested that the next leader should be Maharaj Singh. Many Sikh chiefs and courtly officials, including of the Lahore Durbar, held him in high-regard as well. Maharaj Singh was also given the responsibility of not only the Samparda, but also the duty of initiating the Sikh Soldiers into the Khalsa through Amrit Sanskar ceremony (which was previously held by Baba Bir Singh, the Rajguru of the Sikh empire).

Bhai Maharaj Singh was succeeded by Baba Ram Singh 'Virakt', who was Maharaj Singh's one of the closest and most trusted followers. Ram Singh (not to be confused with Baba Ram Singh of Namdhari sect) was regarded as a fugitive by the British, and used to travel village to village, spreading the teachings of the Sikh Gurus and initiating many into Khalsa. Among his followers included Rani Jindan and prominent sardars of the Lahore court. Ram Singh 'Virakt' was succeeded by the famous Brahmgiani saint, Sant Karam Singh of Hoti Mardan. Bhai Maharaj is therefore regarded as the founder of this Hoti Mardan Valli Sant Khalsa Sampardai order.

== Revolutionary activities ==
By the 1840s, the Sikh Empire remained the last truly independent state of India, the rest having been colonized by European powers. Maharaj Singh is claimed to be the earliest noteworthy Indian who put up a resistance to the colonial British establishment. Amandeep Madra believes that in the early 1840s, he was one of the few, if any, Sikhs who understood the danger the British posed to the Sikh state and the risk of colonization. His insurrectionary activities began in the aftermath of the First Anglo-Sikh War in 1846, just prior to the complete annexation of the Sikh Empire by the British East India Company. After a year of the resident's rule in Punjab following the war, the Punjabis feared that the British would fully annex the region after consolidation.

By the early 1840s, Maharaj Singh's followers numbered in the tens of thousands and his influence was present from Rawalpindi to Amritsar. Bhai Maharaj Singh started addressing crowds of peasants in Central Punjab, with the British fearing his propaganda would challenge their hold over the region and therefore seek his arrest. He had kept in contact with Maharani Jind Kaur, widow of Maharaja Ranjit Singh, assisting her when the need arose. Rani Jindan's image had been tarnished by bazaar gossip, with Maharaj Singh rehabiliating her status in the eyes of the public by equating her as the mother of the Khalsa. In 1847, the British decided to deport Jind Kaur out of the Punjab and attempted to stifle her influence. Maharaj Singh would later be involved in the Prema plot as a result of this news.

Sikhs would welcome the taking up of arms against the British with the words "Ah Wo Maharaj".

=== Prema plot ===
The first action he took is an attempted assassination of Henry Lawrence and additional pro-British members of the Lahore durbar (court) of the Sikh Empire. This is known as the 'Prema conspiracy case' or 'Prema plot' and it occurred in 1847.

After word of mouth about Maharaj Singh's role in the conspiracy, he started to earn mass-appeal amongst the people of Punjab. Sher Singh Attariwala and other Sikh figures would invoke the name of Maharaj Singh when they made efforts to enlist Sikhs for their insurrectionist cause:

On behalf of Baba Maharaj Singh Ji, the undersigned declare that time has arrived when we must get ready to fight the foreign invaders (the British) who with great cunning and deception are succeeding to usurp the Khalsa Raj. It is therefore the sacred duty of every citizen to join this holy struggle and get ready to sacrifice everything in order to free our motherland.

— invocation of Maharaj Singh in a recruitment message

=== British attempts at curtailing ===
The British tried to restrict his movement to Naurangabad, thus he started working in secret with around 600 of his acolytes. His properties in Amritsar were seized and a recompense was declared for his arrest. At one point, the British tried to promote a rumour that had sprung-up Maharaj Singh had drowned after falling off of his famed black horse whilst crossing the Jhelum River, seemingly in-order to demoralize the Sikh masses who looked up him and saw him as their leader. However, after three days the averment came out to be untrue and Maharaj Singh was alive and well. He had built a vast web of interconnections between various sections of Punjabi and Sikh society at the time, which he worked hard to maintain by traveling a lot to visit people.

=== Escalation of activities ===
Trouble brewed in Multan following the murder of Diwan Sawan Mal in 1844. Sawan Mal had five sons, with the eldest son being Diwan Mulraj, who had been the governor of Jhang but was unpopular and succeeded his father's post at Multan. However, owing to the controversies following the First Anglo-Sikh War and internal factionalism in the Lahore court, Mulraj declined to pay his 30 lakhs succession fee. The British Acting Resident at Lahore agreed to a reduced cost of 20 lakhs but in-turn seized part of Jhang district and raised the revenue to be paid on the land held by Mulraj, who struggled to pay it over the years due to the excise duty of goods transported by river being abolished by the Resident, which Mulraj had relied on for funds. The resident also applied appellate power over decisions by Mulraj. The Resident was being adised by two adversaries of Mulraj, namely Raja Lal Singh and Mulraj's brother Karam Narain. Owing to these pressures, Mulraj decided to resign from his duties in December 1847 but was urged to continue on until the winter harvest gathering in March 1848. The British used his resignation as an excuse to strengthen their influence in the region, with Kahan Singh Man being appointed as the successor but real power lying with Vans Agnew of the Civil Service and Lt. Anderson of the European Fusiliers, being accompanied to Multan by a force of fourteen hundred Durbar troops, a Gurkha regiment of infantry, seven hundred cavalry and one hundred artillerymen with six guns. When the Englishmen, Kahan Singh, and their forces arrived, Mulraj ordered his officers to welcome them and handed his keys to Multan fort to them, which was inspected by the new arrivals on 19 April 1848. The Englishmen decided to dismiss the Multani garrison at the fort and replace them with the Gurkha infantry. While Mulraj was escorting the Englishmen to the gate of the fort, an angered member of the Multani garrison which had just been removed from their duties named Amir Chand was offended by the order to offer salaam to the Sahibs who had made the order that caused him to lose his job decided to lunge at Vans Agnew with his spear and pierced Agnew's side. The next day on 20 April 1848, the camp of the British at the Idgah was mobbed by the upset locals, with Agnew being beheaded by a Mazhabi Nihang Sikh named Godar Singh and Anderon being killed by the mob by being hacked into pieces. Agnew's severed head was used as a football by the mob, being set on-fire, urinated, and spat upon. Godar Singh threatened the British that he will kill all of them as far as Calcutta. Mulraj, who had a timid disposition, soon found himself being seen as the leader of this rebellion with little choice in the matter.

When Maharaj Singh got word of the rebellion launched by Diwan Mulraj Chopra in Multan in April 1848, he escalated his anti-British activities. He left for Multan accompanied with a force of 400 horsemen to assist the Sikh governor in his insurrection against the British. In May 1848, a plot to turn the native soldiers against the British was uncovered, which led to the hanging of three plotters and the fourth being sentenced to transportation to life. Rani Jindan was blamed for this conspiracy by the British resident and deported from Punjab, despite a lack of evidence and objections from the Council of Regency. Jewellry was taken from her and she was sent to Benaras under an armed guard with a reduced pension of 12,000 rupees annually. The ill treatment of the rani enraged the Punjabi public and military. The emir of Afghanistan, Dost Muhammad, wrote to the British expressing sympathy to the status of the Sikhs. In May, Maharaj Singh travelled around Majha and gathered local support for Mulraj by construing the struggle as dharamyudh and being mentioned in the Sau Sakhi, with the rebellion previously being opposed by the Sikh Durbar troops as they believed Mulraj and the Multanis were rebelling against Maharaja Duleep Singh. With Maharaj Singh's arrival in Multan, the Sikh ruling class decided to side with the Multanis against the British, leading to the war. The British desired this outcome as it gave them an excuse to annex the Punjab fully. However, the Attariwala sardars still sided with the British Resident. A Sikh named Sujan Singh attempted to assassinate the pro-British figure Sher Singh Attariwala but was caught and blown from a cannon, an unpopular move. Generally, the Sikh chiefs supported the British Resident while the regular Sikh soldiery (Panchayats) supported the rebellion. Chattar Singh Attariwala's, who had supported the British, relations with the British deteriorated when he suspected that the British promise to restore local rule to the Sikhs when Maharaja Duleep Singh came of age was a lie and they refused to allow his daughter's planned marriage to Duleep Singh to occur, with Captain James Abbot being aggressive toward Chattar Singh and betrayed him in early August by rousing local tribes of the northwestern frontier against the Sikhs, including against Chattar Singh. British actions against Chattar Singh led him and his son Sher Singh to join forces against the British. Due to Mulraj having a distrustful nature, he refused to believe Sher Singh Attariwala's pleas that he had become anti-British and the British forged a letter to convince Mulraj against Sher Singh. However, disagreements would emerge between the two leaders, Mulraj and Maharaj Singh, which led to Maharaj Singh making leave for Hazara in June 1848 to meet-up with Chattar Singh Attariwala and petition for his assistance in his anti-British scheme. Later, Chattar Singh entered into negotiations with the Afghans and promised them the return of Peshawar if they helped expel the British from the Punjab. The two centres of the rebellion were in Multan and the North-West Froniter. According to Khushwant Singh, the entire rebellion was formented and nurtured by Dalhousie as an excuse to annex the Sikh Empire. Patwant Singh came to a similar conclusion.

=== Participation in the Second Anglo-Sikh Wars ===
In November 1848, he partook in the Battle of Ramnagar alongside Sher Singh Attariwala. He rode a black horse in the battle and attempted to raise the moral of the Sikh forces at-battle, requesting them to put their lives on the line for the defence of their nation. He also was present at the battles of Chillianwala and Gujrat.

In the aftermath of the Battle of Gujrat, he escaped to Rawalpindi and tried again and again to request the Sikh chiefs to fight another battle against the British, either at Rawalpindi or at Panja Sahib. However, his petition fell upon deaf ears as the Sikh leaders at that time were not in-favour of his plan.

James Broun-Ramsay (Lord Dalhousie) recognized that the Sikhs did not want to free only Punjab but rather the entire Indian subcontinent:

... these battles (Chilianvala and Gujrat) were fought by the Sikhs directly against the English people. The purpose was to destroy the influence of the British from not only Punjab but the entire Indian sub-continent.

— James Broun-Ramsay (Lord Dalhousie), governor general of India

After the surrender of Sher Singh Attariwala to the British forces on 14 March 1849 at Rawalpindi, he decided to continue his struggle against the British alone.

Maharaj Singh would make the following communication to his fellow Sikhs in-response to the surrender of Sikh military and political power to the British:

You own large estates now which you want to save by surrendering to the British. But let me tell you, even by accepting all the conditions of the British you may not be able to save your estates because you will be on the mercy of the conquerors and will have to accept whatever crumbs they throw towards you. It would be better if you fight and get martyrdom rather than live a wretched life of a slave.

— Maharaj Singh's appeal to surrendering Sikhs

Henry Lawrence would make the following remark:

Bhai Maharaj Singh, a Sikh priest of reputed sanctity, and of great influence, the first man who raised the standards of rebellion beyond the confines of Multan in 1848, and the only leader of note who did not lay down his arms to Sir Walter Gilberts at Rawalpindi.

— Henry Lawrence

Bikram Singh Bedi, a direct descendant of Guru Nanak, and Colonel Richhpal Singh Purbia, were the only two of the prominent Sikhs who agreed with Maharaj Singh and decided to accompany him to continue the struggle. Another figure who remained a holdout against the British was Narain Singh. Eventually, Narain Singh was arrested and Richhpal Singh was fatally wounded near Aligarh by the police. Maharaj Singh had a 10,000 rupee bounty placed for his capture or death by the British. The Sikh Empire was annexed by the British East India Company on 29 March 1849.

=== Escape to Jammu ===
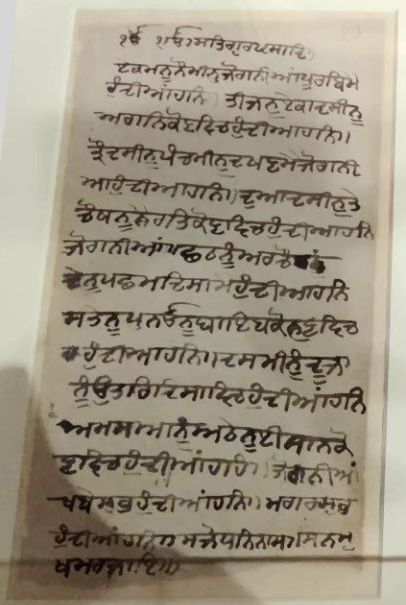
Handwritten Gurmukhi manuscript from the Bhai Maharaj Singh Collection, circa 1840s

He retreated to Jammu and secretly made Dev Batala his new base of operations. He wanted to engender a new war in-which all Punjabis would rise-up against their British overlords on a fixed date as a united fighting force. He later relocated to Chambi, a location that was even more difficult to access and secluded. From this location, he would send secret messages to the various former subjects of the Sikh Empire, pressing them to reignite the fight against the British and push them out of Punjab.

His secretive emissaries were mostly "discharged soldiers of the Khalsa Army, the Jagirdars and chiefs who had been dispossessed of their estates of pension by the British authorities and also the holders of religious estates, particularly the Gosains in the Kangra hills, who could help him finance the freedom struggle."

==== Five-point plan ====
Maharaj Singh had developed a "five-point plan" to defeat the British and win back sovereignty, the five goals were as follows:

1. To liberate Maharaja Dalip Singh from the Lahore Fort and bring him back to the Panjab Hills and to refresh the freedom fight under his name before the British could succeed in taking him abroad out of India as they desired.
2. To arrange a united fighting force of all the groups who had suffered due to the British antics, including jagirdars, veterans (ex-military), the Rajput chiefs of the Hills, amid others.
3. To counter-act the British scheme of divide-and-conquer, by using local Muslims against Sikh interests and pitting the two groups against one another, by creating an alliance with Pashtun rebels of the northwest regions of the subcontinent and Afghanistan, the Emir of Afghanistan, and local Punjabi Muslims.
4. Establish contact and win-over the support of paramount Sikh and Hindu clergy and saintly figures due to their ample resources, land-holdings (jagirs), and large number of patrons and supporters. They would canvass regions ranging from Kandhar in Afghanistan to Malwa in the Cis-Sutlej region for these individuals that could help their objectives.
5. Sabotage the British administrative system operating in the Punjab through guerilla tactics and asymmetric warfare (surprise raids and promoting insurgency amongst the people). They also sought to win over the Sikhs employed in the colonial military forces of the British to their cause.

=== Duleep Singh's leave of the Punjab ===
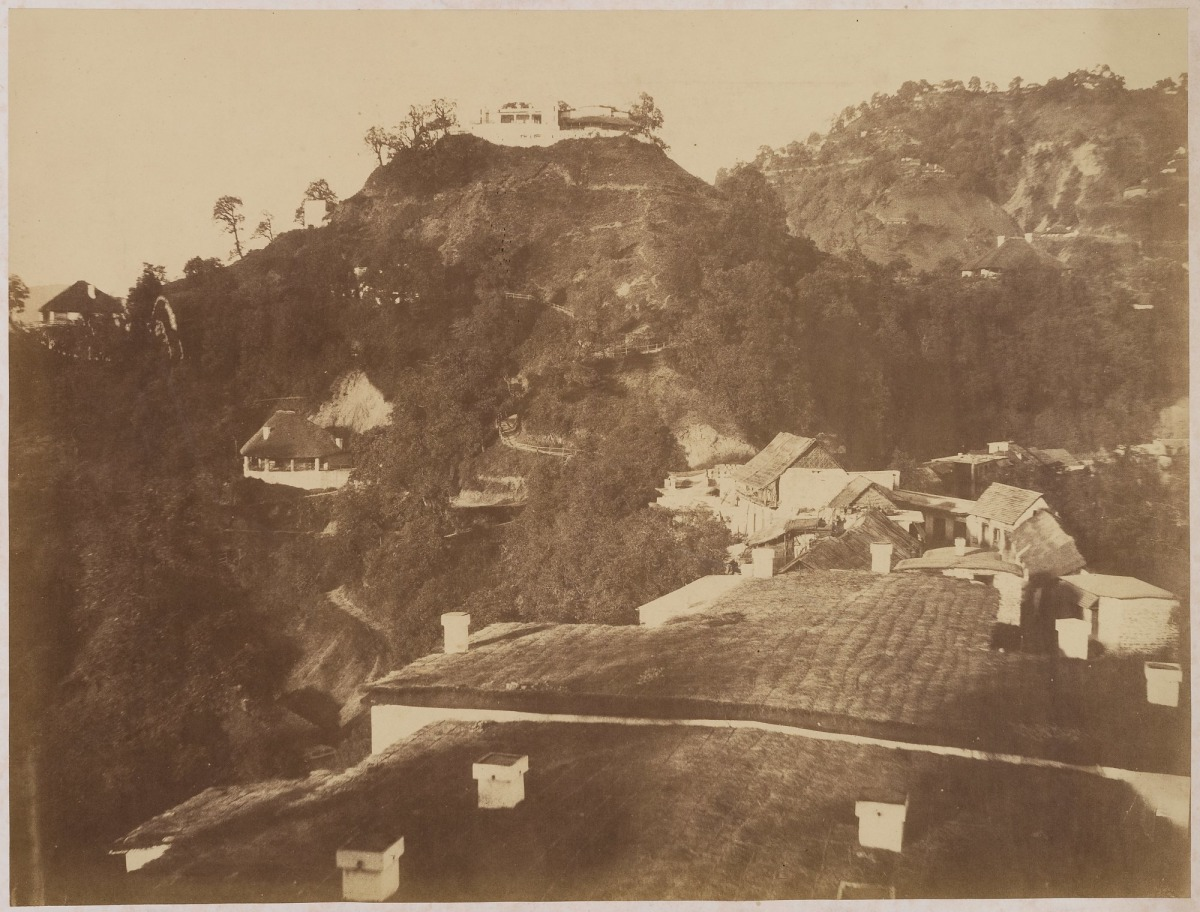
"Dhileep Singh's (Maharaja Duleep Singh) House, the Castle, Mussoorie", photographed by Robert Christopher Tytler and Harriet C. Tytler, ca.1857–1858, printed 1859

Maharaj Singh came to learn about the British plan to remove Duleep Singh, the last Maharaja of the Sikh Empire, from the Punjab by sending him abroad to England. Maharaj Singh perceived this as a major blow to the freedom struggle and therefore he sent six of his loyal followers on a mission to Lahore where they would be intercepted by Mian Ganesh, who was planned to aid them in their undertaking. They had designed to somehow bring Maharaja Duleep Singh to their headquarters in the Jammu Hills, where they would lead a more general rebellion against the British from. Thus, five or six persons from the mission would always reside near the palace walls where Duleep Singh was kept at with the goal of abducting him and taking him back to fulfill their ultimate plan.

The British caught wind of a conspiracy and decided to move Duleep Singh to Mussoorie. They also urged members of the Muslim community to seek out the whereabouts of Maharaj Singh by promising them a hefty reward. They further tried to frame him as a mere religious leader to diminish his aura as a military and political figure. They kept trying to capture Maharaj Singh but kept-on failing to do so as he kept evading them. As a result, Maharaj Singh became known as Karnivala (meaning 'the wonder worker') by the people since he kept on eluding the British.

=== Preparations for full-on rebellion ===
Thus, Maharaj Singh would need to undertake necessary preparations to set the plan into motion. He decided to reside at Sajuwal (located in present-day Batala district) from where he planned to launch offensives against the cantonments at Hoshiarpur, Hajipur, and Jalandhar. He needed funds and manpower for his upcoming plan and therefore decided to elicit the help of the common people. He sent agents to faraway places, such as Kabul and Kandahar, to advance his plan.

Contact was established with Afghan rulers Amir Dost Mohammad Khan and Sultan Mohammad Khan. The Afghans straight-up refused to give any help to Maharaj Singh and his retinue. He also solicited the help of the Maharaja of Bikaner and Gulab Singh of Kashmir. However, none of these states would offer him assistance.

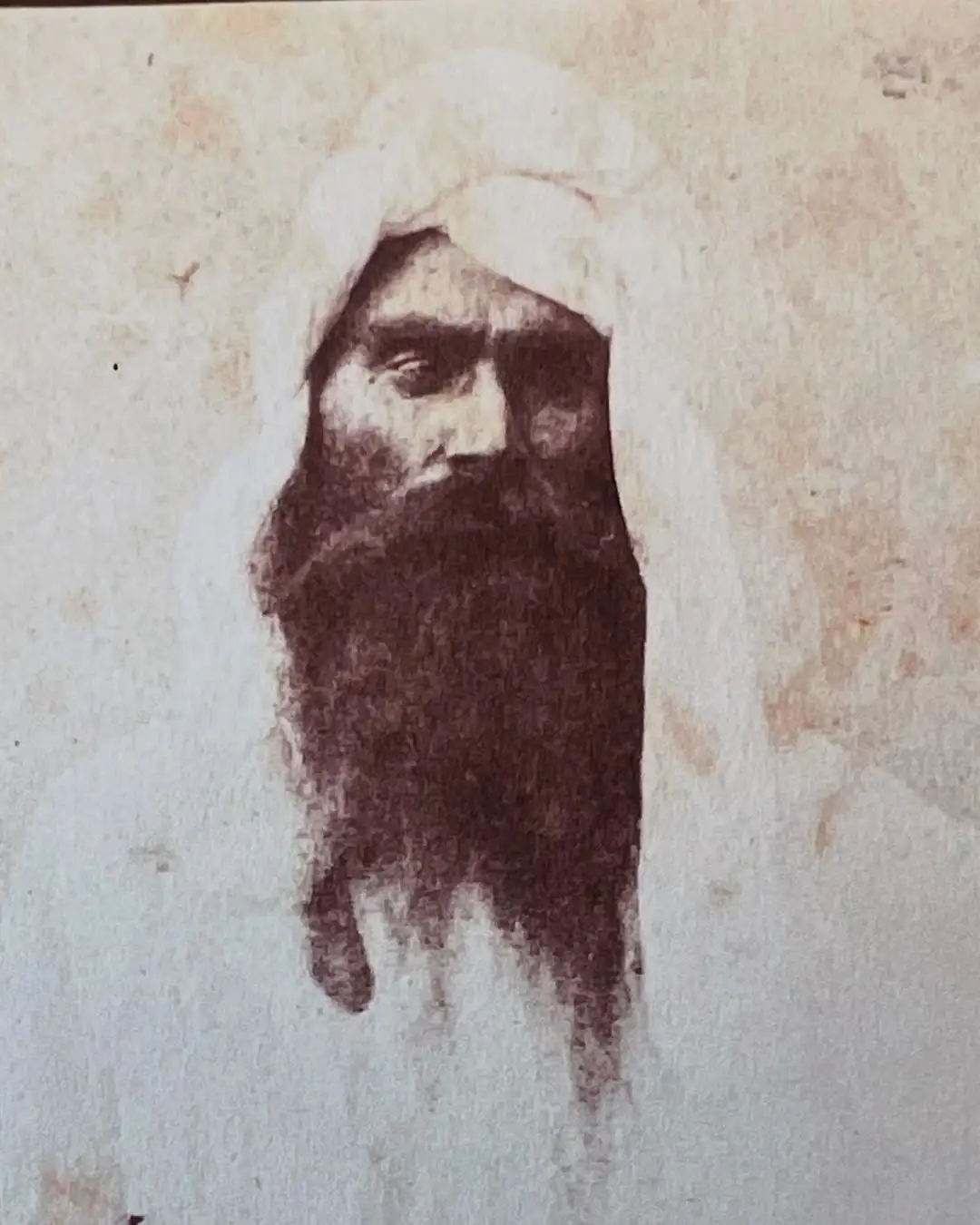
Bikram Singh Bedi (died 1863). Calotype by Dr. John McCosh, Lahore, November 1849. Held by the National Army Museum.

Prominent Sikh figures, such Bikram Singh Bedi of the Punjab Hills, son of the well-respected Sahib Singh Bedi and a direct descendant of Guru Nanak, decided to assist Maharaj Singh in his endeavor. A progeny of the Kangra State's royalty and other important families of the day had committed to supplying the resistance forces with 1,000 matchlockmen, 10,000–20,000 rupees, and nearly 10,000 maunds of grain for the affair.

These activities had piqued the interest of the Attariwala chiefs, Dewan Hakim Rai, and the Majithia family. However, these aforementioned groups could not be of much help because their movement had been confined to their native villages as per the orders of the British authorities. Fakirs and Brahmins who had worked as couriers of Jind Kaur and the Sikh chiefs during the pre-annexation period began to pay visits to the residences of former rebel leaders, prominent chiefs, and other influential members of the native society. The British cautiously realized that these chiefs were working in unison with Maharaj Singh in-order to launch a rebellion.

After these reassurances, Maharaj Singh decided it was time to leave Sajuwal and make way to Hoshiarpur in December 1849, where he had established correspondence with influential families of the locality and attempted to garner the support of the Sikh regiments there. The Hoshiarpur residential families had guarnteed to him that preparations were made to plunder the British government treasury located at Bajwara and after launch an attack upon the New Hoshiarpur cantonment.

Maharaj Singh also paid visits to figures within the regiment, such as Prem Singh, Sukha Singh, Fateh Singh, Zai Singh Havildar, amid others. Around this time, he received intel that designs had been finished for the gathering of almost 4,000 men at Datarpur (located near Hajipur) and similar actions were also finalized in Majha, Malwa and Hazara.

They had set the date of the attacks upon the cantonments of Hoshiarpur and Jalandhar as 3 January 1850, the beginning of a "National War". This date was set at a meeting at Sham Chaurasi (located in Hoshiarpur district) of all the involved people. As this date approached, Maharaj Singh made hasty visits to areas within the Jalandhar Doab, where his secret operatives had been working.

== Arrest ==
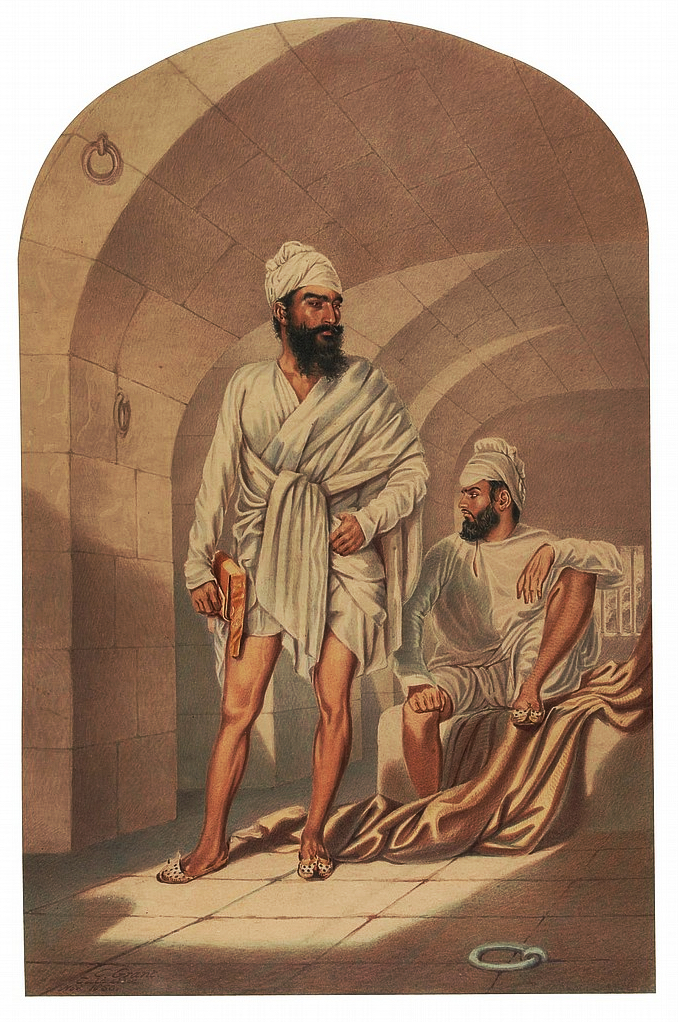
Bhai Maharaj Singh (standing) and companion (Khurruck Singh, seated on right) in a prison cell. Painted in Calcutta in November 1850.

The surveying was completed and he next decided to make way to Adampur. This would prove to be a mistake of the increasingly salient Maharaj Singh. There existed a 10,000 rupee bounty placed against Maharaj Singh, either dead or alive. This was the largest bounty reward amount for any outlaw of that period by the British. A Muslim informer reported his location to local authorities. Amardeep Singh believes whoever turned him in probably did so for financial reasons as the reward amount was a hefty sum for that time, enough to transform someone's life. He was arrested at Adampur in a sugarcane field along with 21 of his followers on 28 December 1849 by Henry Vansittart.

When he was imprisoned at Jalandhar, the guards put their guns, started kneeling and proceeded to bow to Maharaj Singh. Local residents, Sikhs, Hindus, and Muslims alike, from neighbouring villages started visiting where Maharaj Singh was jailed in Jalandhar to venerate him. At first he was kept at the Jalandhar jail, but due to growing masses of thousands of sympathetic Sikhs, Hindus, and Muslims demanding for his release and paying him visits in prison, he was relocated to Allahabad fort prison by the district magistrate to be incarcerated under military authority, accompanied by his followers, including Khurruck Singh, his most trusted follower. After a month, he was moved again but this time to Fort William in Calcutta. It was decided that a public trial of Maharaj Singh in India was not in the interest of the British.

McLeod would make the following statement about Maharaj Singh:

I am convinced that Bhai Maharaj Singh is a remarkable person. He has all the attributes of a saint. He has unusual self-control and self-confidence. He seems to have the power to foresee the coming events and has the qualities of a great leader whom people would like to obey.

— Donald McLeod, commissioner of Jalandhar division

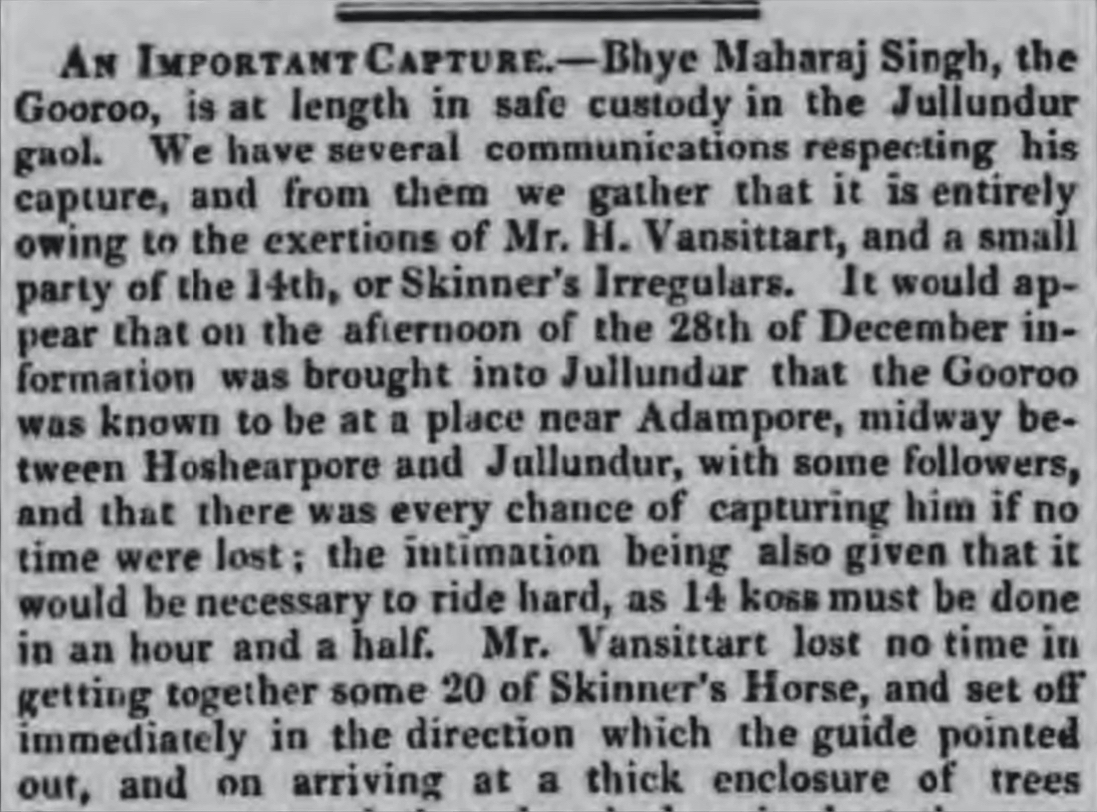
Newspaper snippet reporting the capture and arrest of Bhai Maharaj Singh. From 'The Cheltenham Chronicle', Thursday 28 February 1850.

Henry Vansittart, who was the Jalandhar deputy commissioner, had been left with a deep impression by Maharaj Singh and thus wanted him to be given special treatment. However, the British government did not want any threats to their rule around and decided to exile him to Singapore as they believed it was too risky for him to remain in India.

The governor general of India, James Broun-Ramsay, ordered him to be moved to Singapore. The order was placed on 23 March 1850. There was specific instruction that Maharaj Singh and Khurruck Singh were to be imprisoned in solitary confinement until their death.

Henry Vansittart paid the following tribute to Maharaj Singh in words:

The Guru [Maharaj Singh] is no ordinary man ... He is to the natives what Jesus is to the most zealous of Christians. His miracles were seen by tens of thousands and are more implicitly believed than those worked by the ancient prophets.

— Henry Vansittart, the Jalandhar deputy commissioner

== Exile ==
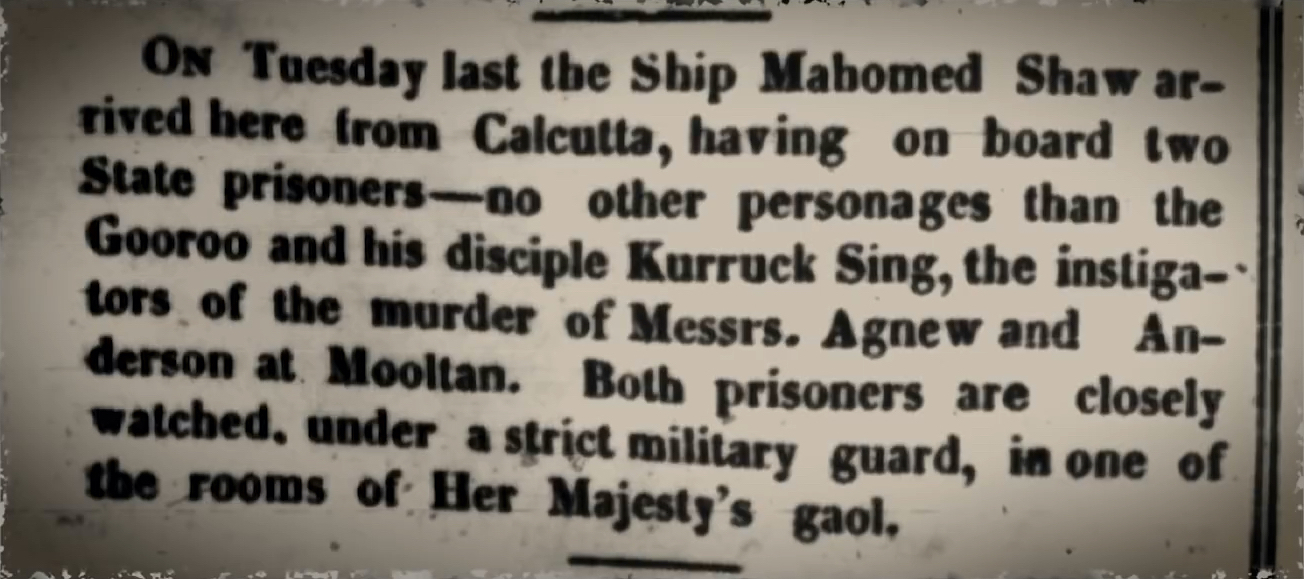
Newspaper snippet reporting the arrival of Bhai Maharaj Singh and Khurruck Singh in Singapore. From the 'Strait Times and Singapore Journal of Commerce', Tuesday 18 June 1850.

He was exiled to Singapore in 1850 by the British authorities due to his anti-colonial, revolutionary activities in Punjab. The ship that he was transported on to make the journey to Singapore was the Muhmed Shah or Muhammad Shah. It disembarked from the Port of Calcutta on 15 May 1850. He arrived in Singapore, alongside his closest disciple Khurruck Singh, on 14 June 1850, being the first Indian freedom fighter to be sent there. Other sources claim his date of arrival in Singapore to be 9 July 1850. He was imprisoned in New Jail on Outram Road (also known as 'Outram Prison'), being held in solitary confinement for years. His cell was located on an upper story, with the two windows in the room walled-up, and the verandah was enforced with an impenetrable iron gate. By dimensions, the cell was 14 by 15 feet and as per British admission was: "... further rendered dark, dinghy and absolutely unhealthy" (Secret Consultation Papers, 28th Feb 1851, #52-57).

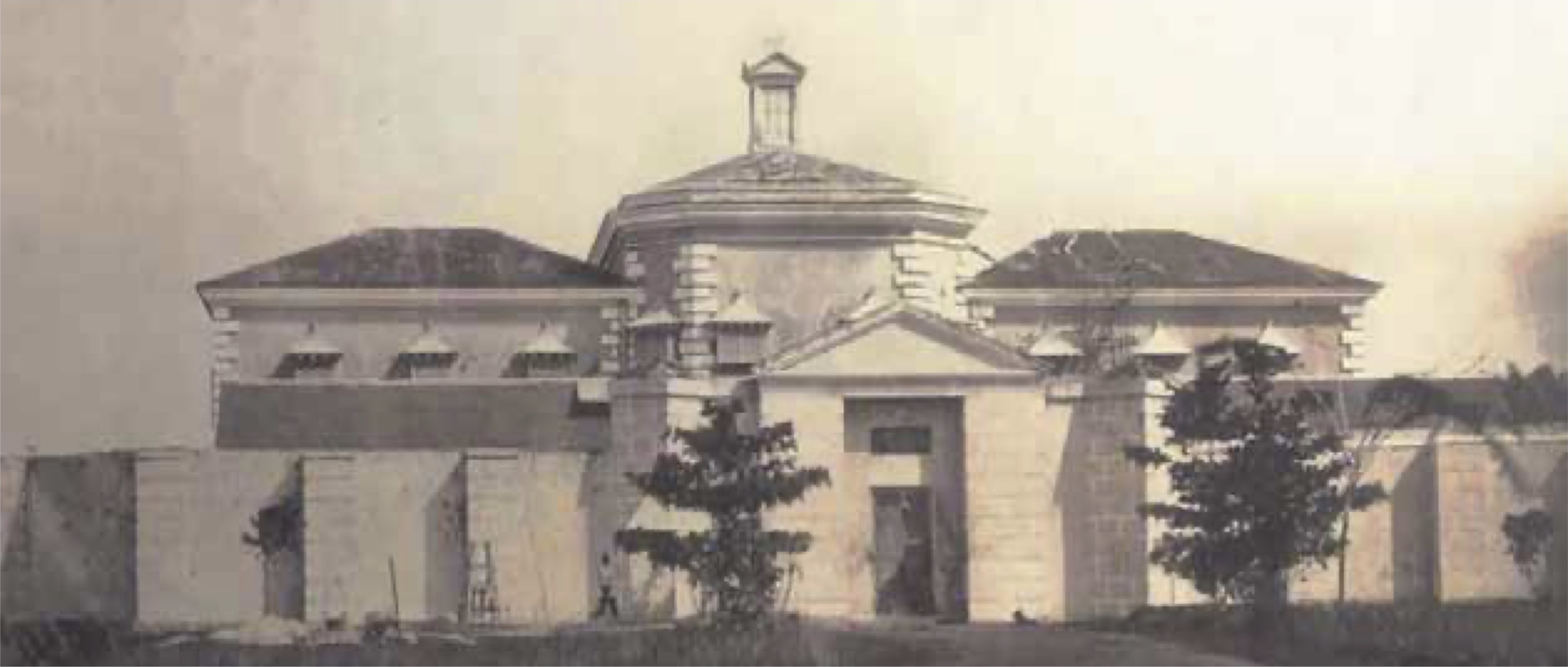
Photograph of Outram Prison (Pearl's Hill Prison; also known as 'Outram Road Prison') in the 1850s. Bhai Maharaj Singh was imprisoned here from 1850 to 1856.

During his imprisonment in Singapore, the British had bestowed him with special privileges, such as extra food provisions, the ability to send letters back home to Punjab, and providing him with literature in the form of books. Khurruck Singh refused to cook or prepare food for the pair, therefore the British decided to hire a personal cook, who would be paid a salary of four rupees per month, for the two inmates, a very odd and unique case in that time period in-regards to the general treatment of non-European prisoners.

The British governor of the Straits Settlement went as far as personally requesting to the British authorities in Calcutta that a specific 115-year-old (at that time) manuscript of the Guru Granth Sahib from the Punjab be found and brought to the prison in-order to placate to the religious needs of the Sikh prisoner. The British went through a lot of difficulties in-order to locate this specific, old volume and bring it to Singapore to the prison Maharaj Singh was held at. The volume was transported by means of a bullock cart from Lahore to Calcutta, where it would be sent by sea aboard a ship. This may have possibly been the first Guru Granth Sahib to be present in Singapore.

The two inmates both recorded their personal thoughts, including struggles, during their time while incarcerated. Maharaj Singh reportedly felt maddened that he had gone from a well-respect rebel leader back home to a frail prisoner who needed help getting around due to poor and failing health.

=== Illnesses and death ===
However, after three years of solitary confinement he had gone blind due to cataracts. He further suffered from rheumatic pains, suffered agony in his feet and ankles, and was emaciated and starved into a breathing skeleton figure. Maharaj Singh eventually developed oral cancer affecting his tongue. Due to his poor health, the civil surgeon made a request that Maharaj Singh be allowed to occasional walks in the open environment, but this suggestion was turned down by the authorities citing "security reasons". Thus, Maharaj Singh's condition worsened. Two months prior to his death his condition deteriorated to such a degree that his tongue and neck swelled to such an extent which made eating difficult due to trouble swallowing.

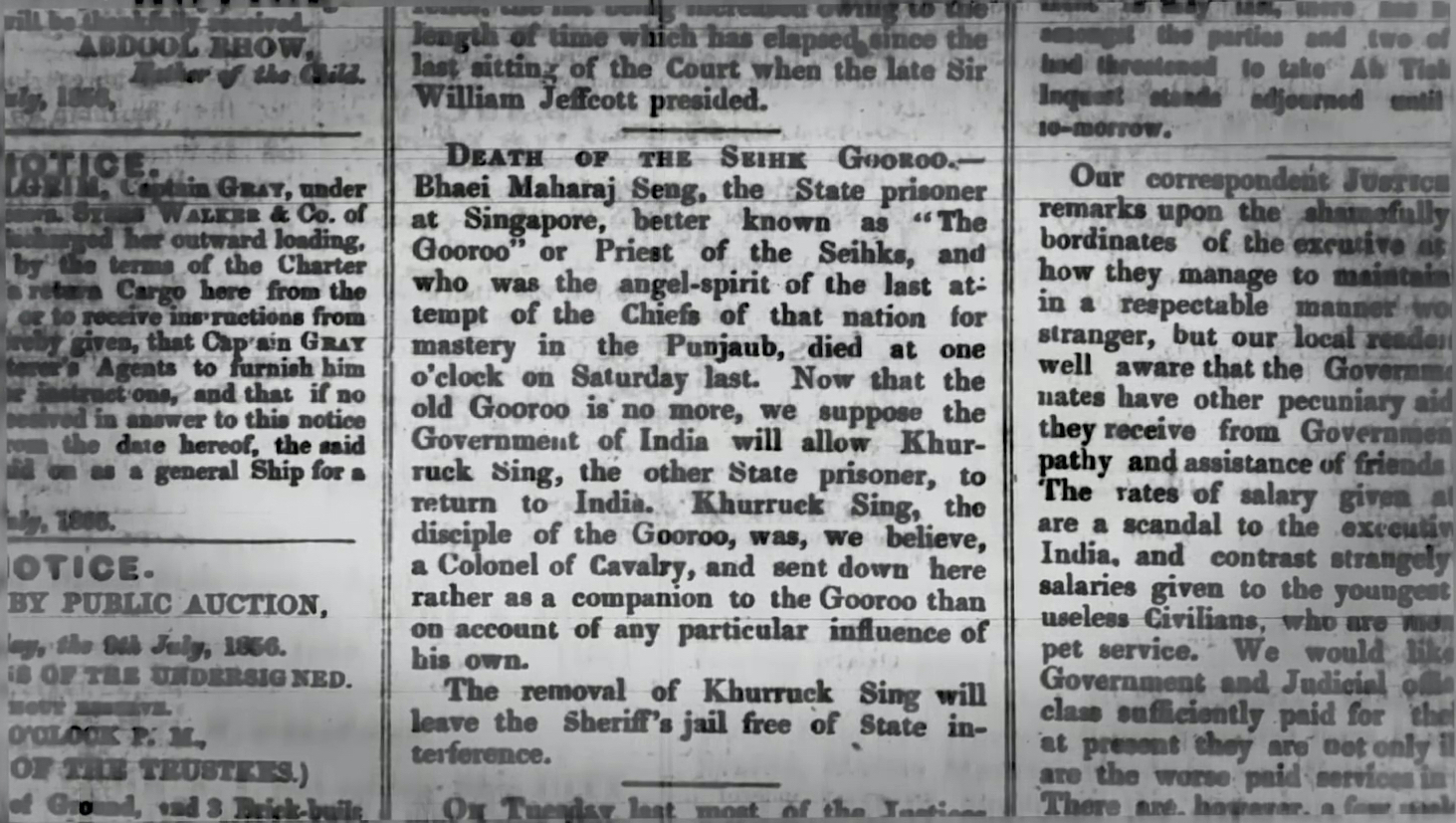
Newspaper snippet reporting the death of Bhai Maharaj Singh in Singapore. From the 'Strait Times and Singapore Journal of Commerce', Monday 8 July 1856.

He remained imprisoned until his death by throat cancer on 5 July 1856.

G. M. Blundel, Governor of the Straits Settlements, sent the following message reporting the death to the colonial office of British India:

I have the honour to report to you for the information of the Right Hon'ble the Governor General of India-in-Council, that the State Prisoner, "Bhaie Maharaj Singh" died on the 5th instant.

— G. M. Blundel, Governor of the Straits Settlements, Document # 86, 12 July 1856

His remains were cremated outside of the prison by his trusted follower and inmate, Khurruck Singh. However, Nahar Singh and Kirpal Singh (1990) claim there was nobody to cremate his remains and it is unknown what happened to them. Khurruck Singh himself would suffer a similar fate: he was also imprisoned in Singapore at the same jail but was later transferred to a prison in Penang, Malaya, where he also died.

It appears to be certain that the Bhai [Maharaj Singh] was in some respects a very remarkable man. He possessed very great sagacity and self-reliance.

— Donald McLeod, commissioner of Jalandhar division

According to Choor Singh, an unmarked tombstone formerly located near Singapore General Hospital was the tomb of Maharaj Singh and it was popularly believed as such. The site became venerated across ethnic and religious lines. Some Sikhs believed the site marked the bural spot of Bhai Maharaj Singh while other Sikhs believed it was the resting place of Baba Karam Singh. Later a proper samadhi structure would be erected, with the Guru Granth Sahib being installed in it to transform the site into a gurdwara. The government requested the Sikhs to demolish the site as it was located on the grounds of the General Hospital and attracting greater amounts of devotees.

== Miracles ==
Many miracles are associated with Maharaj Singh. Amandeep Madra sees the origin of these miracles from the fact he was a single man rising up against the British and somehow kept escaping their capture. This elevated his image in the minds of his countrymen to that of a miracle-worker and a larger-than-life figure. Maharaj Singh never claimed to be a miracle-worker and instead it was others who attributed miraculous powers to him.

At least seven miracles are associated with him drawn from oral histories. Some miracles associated with his life as relayed throughout the years are as follows:

- Dropping his ladle into a boiling hot pot whilst cooking dhal for langar meals and being able to dip his hand and arm into the pot and stir it with his limb. Apparently no visible injury was seen by those who witnessed this.
- Somehow appearing outside of his heavily secured cell at the prison he was held in.
- Being able to lift heavy loads two-feet above his head with one arm.
- Whilst giving out communal meals to devotees, the food supplies would seemingly never run out.
- Nurses, including Chinese, Malay, and Punjabi-origin ones, working at the Singapore General Hospital, would claim to have sightings of him in the Nurse Quarters, accompanying them on night walks. In these apparitions, he is described as walking straight and slowly, never going to the left or right directions. He would disappear into a small, green field.
- Three non-Sikhs (Muslim, North Indian Hindu, and an Englishman) becoming his follower after supernatural encounters with Maharaj Singh
- Being able to exorcise evil spirits through the phrase Baba Ji

== Legacy ==
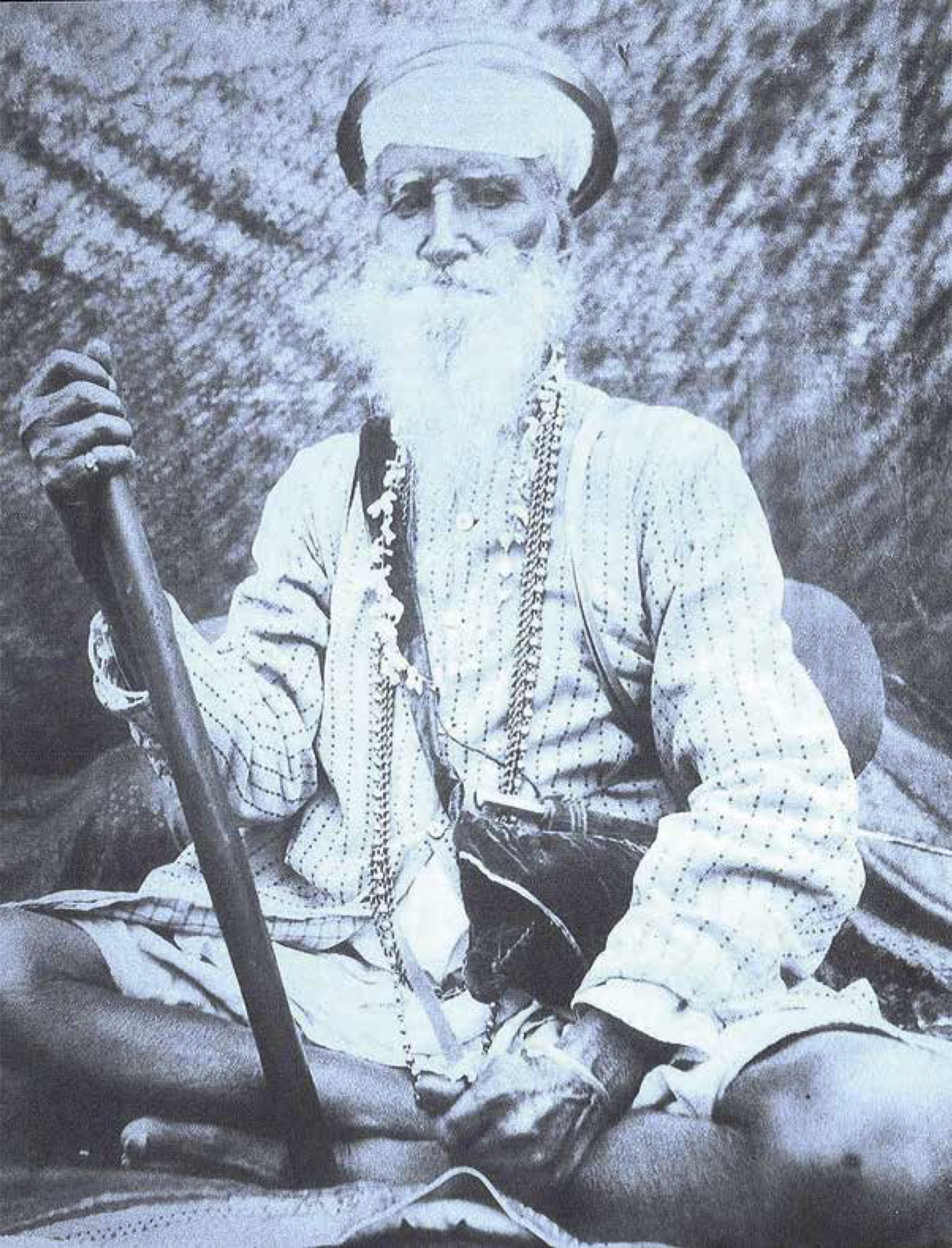
Elderly Sikh man photographed in the 1870s. This photograph is commonly misattributed to be of Sikh revolutionary Bhai Maharaj Singh, this is argued against by Sikh historian Amandeep Madra.

Maharaj Singh is remembered in Singapore and Punjab as a martyr (shaheed). Some of the British had compared him to Jesus Christ, namely Henri Vanisttart. He was skilled at "stirring up the masses". By the early 1990s, the Singaporean Sikh community began to view Maharaj Singh as the founder of their community in an effort to find historical precedence for the Sikh presence in Singapore, with a memorial dedicated to him located at Gurdwara Silat Road. The book Bhai Maharaj Singh: Saint-Soldier by Choor Singh Sidhu was published in 1991 by the Central Sikh Gurdwara Board in Singapore to raise awareness of Maharaj Singh. A revised version titled Bhai Maharaj Singh: Martyr of the Sikh Faith was republished several years later in 1998. A hagiographical book on him written originally in Punjabi by a Singaporean Sikh named Karam Singh in 1996 was partially translated to English and published under the title Bhai Maharaj Singh Ji, 1780–1856: Some Glimpses of His Life. However, he remained a somewhat forgotten figure amongst Punjabis, as noted by the Spokesman (Chandigarh, August 1996 issue), which blames the British for this.

It is noted that he did not have any self-serving aims or motivations by resisting the British colonists but rather saw it as a divine mission of his to free Punjab. In the aftermath of the Second Anglo-Sikh War, the Sikh resistance against the British simmered down for a variety of reasons: the taking of Duleep Singh out of the country, Jind Kaur residing in Nepal, where she would not reliably be able to guide the rebels back home, and many pro-Sikh independence leaders and prominent figures of the Sikh Empire being held in jails or exiled by the British. Maharaj Singh is celebrated for reinvigorating the resistance movement against the British in this environment.

The Singaporean Sikh community remembers him as being the first Sikh in Singapore, albeit not by his own volition. He remains an unknown figure in wider Singaporean society despite his historical importance. Some have compared his life to that of Che Guevara. His life story remains better known in Singapore than his native India.

Sikh historian Sukhpreet Singh Udhoke stresses the importance of keeping in mind that Maharaj Singh operated under the context of a saint-soldier when historically analyzing his life. He traces the ideology of Maharaj Singh back to the concept of miri-piri established by the sixth guru of the Sikhs, Guru Hargobind. Miri-piri is the careful and delicate but necessary and vital balance of state power with spiritual power. Udhoke comes to the conclusion that Maharaj Singh transformed from a saint to a soldier, whilst his mentor, Bir Singh, had earlier transformed from a soldier to a saint yet both of them had lived the principle of miri-piri. Udhoke further asserts that Maharaj Singh strongly believed in the ideals of the Sikh state and its governance which had a positive impact on the common people, such as the high-quality of education provided for its people. He believes aspects like this is what drove him to fighting so hard to save the state and restoring it after annexation.

W. H. McLeod identifies Maharaj Singh as part of the Sant movement, especially the militant-religious leadership that arose in the mid-19th century Punjab to perceived threats against the Khalsa. Thus, he is somewhat of a forerunner to the later Sant-linked militant movements in 20th century Punjab. Harjot Oberoi identifies him as part of the Bhai tradition, which spread Sanatan Sikhism in the 19th century.

In Singapore, it is common for older Sikhs, especially women, to venerate him as Baba Karni Wala ("the old man of miracles") at the Bhai Maharaj Singh Memorial (which is a samadh), where prayers, flowers, jewellry, and money are offered. Furthermore, joss-sticks are burnt and oil lamps are lit. At the back of his shrine, candles are lit by such women. He is worshipped for personal well-being, for successful surgeries, and for supplication-granting. He is venerated across ethnicites, such as by Chinese, Malays, Tamils, Punjabis, and non-Sikh North Indians. In his birth village, many local girls and women continue singing traditional folk-songs invoking him.

=== Tomb ===
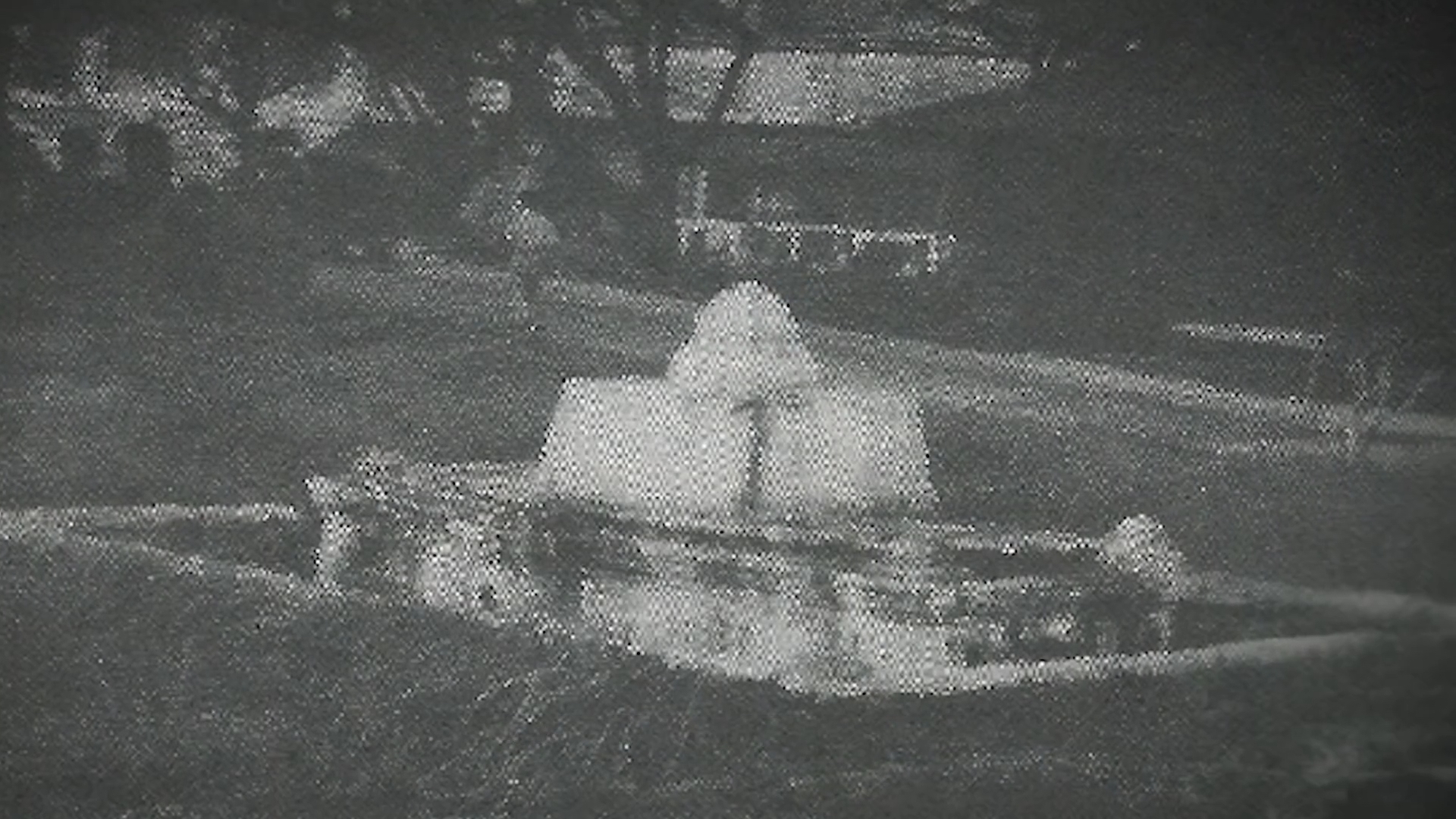
Photograph of the Samadhi of Bhai Maharaj Singh (then referred to as 'Baba Karam Singh') on the grounds of Singapore General Hospital

Many admirers, including non-Sikhs such as local Tamils, ethnic Chinese, and Malays, would make visits to his grave-site. The Tamils would first revere the spot with flowers and mark it with stones. Muslims installed green flags on poles around it, venerating the site as belonging to a Kramat. Sikhs and Muslim visitors would leave flowers out of respect. Eventually, local Sikhs would erect a permanent samadhi structure at the spot. Sikh and non-Sikh visitors alike would make offerings to the shrine, including the leaving of valuable goods.

In the period after World War II, devotee numbers visiting the samadhi kept on increasing. During the 1940s, the samadhi (tombstone) location was shifted from Outram Prison to the location of the Singapore General Hospital due to development plans. The new location of the samadhi was chosen in the small, green field where apparitions of Maharaj Singh had been reported to disappear into. Regular prayers were being convened at the location. However, the local Singaporeans named the saint whom the samadhi was dedicated to as 'Karam Singh', the name 'Maharaj Singh' was unknown to the local worshippers. This new name is theorized to have been derived from karmiwala, which Maharaj Singh had alternatively been known by. 'Karam Singh' formed as a shortened or diminutive form of this appellation overtime. Most of the locals who visited the shrine hailed from the Kampong Bahru and Silat Road neighbourhoods of Singapore. A South Indian man was responsible for ensuring the cleanliness of the sanctum and would clean it regularly. In 1961, a Sikh police officer decided to install a copy of the Guru Granth Sahib permanently at the samadhi after believing a wish of his came true from visiting the shrine. This led to even larger numbers of visitors, which started interfering with the operations of the hospital as the crowds were hindering the ambulances' movement. Thus, an agreement was reached between the Sikh community and the Singapore government that the shrine be relocated to the grounds of the Silat Road Sikh Temple. The work to relocate the shrine began on 12 October 1966 at around 7 p.m. The transportation of the samadhi was a community-led effort, with the local Sikhs carrying pieces of it personally to the new location.

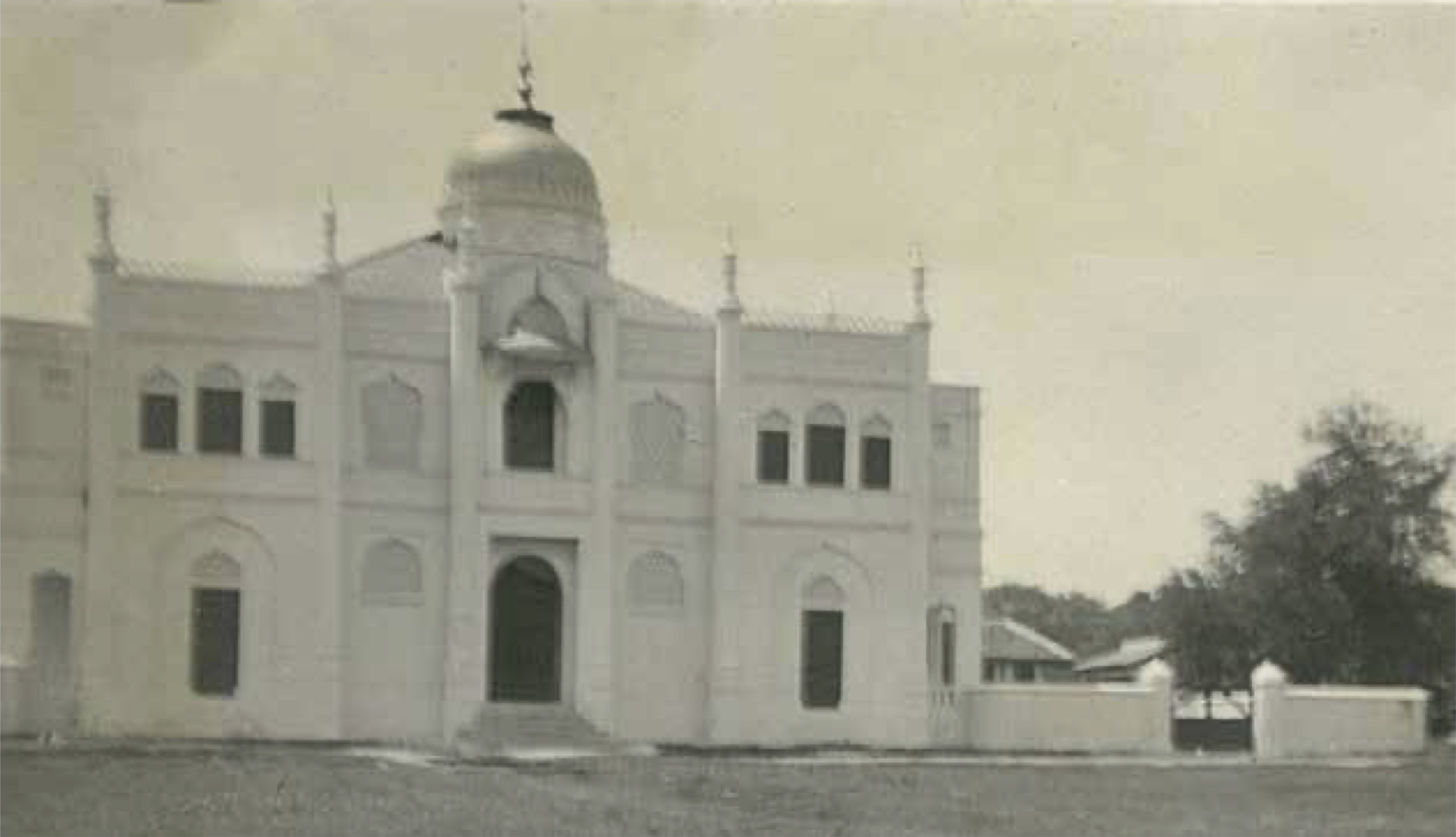
Gurdwara Sahib Silat Road in Singapore after construction was just completed in 1924

The samadhi was located in front of the Silat Road Sikh Temple for a period of around 30 years, in the area currently occupied by the male shoe storage. A construction of a new Bhai Maharaj Singh Memorial building started in the early 1990s and was completed in 1994. The cost of the project was three million Singaporean dollars. It officially opened on 23 October 1995 by Kartar Singh Thakral. In 1996, the construction of a formal memorial was finalized next to the gurdwara. On 14 November 1999, the National Heritage Board (Singapore) designated the memorial as a "historical site". At the site, an annual festival commemorating Maharaj Singh is observed which is known as Barsi. An akhand path is held at such festivals. At the memorial, devotees first pay supplication to the Guru Granth Sahib installed at the entrance and then perform circumabulations around the dais of the samadh of Maharaj Singh.

In 2006, the local Sikh community commemorated the 150th anniversary of Bhai Maharaj Singh's death. A book was shortly published thereafter by the community documenting the life of Maharaj Singh and the temple. In 2010, the memorial building housing the samadhi was further expanded. A recent push is for a Bhai Maharaj Singh Memorial Gurdwara, as reformist sections of the Sikh community oppose veneration of the sant at his samadh, which they believe is against Sikh tenets regarding grave-worship and that instead such worship should be conducted at a proper gurdwara.

Prominent personalities who have paid respect at the shrine include Lee Kuan Yew, former leader of Singapore, whom was satisfied by the beautification of the memorial site. Other prominent visitors include S. R. Nathan (former president of Singapore), S. Jayakumar (former senior minister of Singapore), Tharman Shanmugaratnam (former deputy prime minister of Singapore). Even to the present-day, pilgrims and well-wishers of various ethnic backgrounds visit the location to pay their respects to Maharaj Singh, for healing, and to make wishes that they hope will come true.

=== Monuments ===
At his home village, the Damdama Sahib Gurdwara was erected just outside in his memory. A monument and statue dedicated to him was unveiled in his native village of Rabbon Uchi in 2021 by then chief minister Charanjit Singh Channi.

=== Popular culture ===
In 2019, a documentary titled 'Uncovering the Story of Singapore's First Sikh – The Saint Soldier' was produced by Singaporean Sikh, Upneet Kaur-Nagpal, on his life. The documentary premiered on 8 September 2019 at Fort Canning.

=== Quotes ===
Author Nahar Singh said the following about Maharaj Singh:

The fact that Bhai (Gooroo) Maharaj Singh had played a leading role in organising an armed struggle for the overthrow of the British regime in the Punjab during the years 1846 to 1850, has been known to very few scholars. He beat (Gagan Damama) Dharm Dhaunsa or battle drum in the name of religion against the British and declared that the act of driving out the Malech Farangies from the holy land of five rivers was Dharm or sacred duty and a noble deed of piety and righteousness.

— Nahar Singh, Preface of "Documents Related to Bhai Maharaj Singh" in the Rebels Against British Raj series (Volume 5; published in 1968 by the Sikh History Source Material Search Association)

An article in The Times of London states:

It is well known in certain circles that the influence of this man is unbounded amongst the Sikh chieftains and the whole population of the Punjab; and there is little doubt but that he has generally been the prime mover in all the conspiracies and revolts which have lately caused so much of the Punjab expense and led to so much bloodshed.

— The Times of London, Cheltenham Chronicle, Thursday 28 February 1850

Justice Choor Singh of Singapore in Bhai Maharaj Singh: Saint-Soldier of the Sikh Faith documentary says the following:

[It] must not be forgotten that Bhai Maharaj Singh was also the Head of the Religious Order, now known as Hoti Mardan Vali Sant Khalsa Sampardai, which had been established by Bhai Daya Singh, one of the five Panj Piyaras of Guru Gobind Singh ... Bhai Maharaj Singh was therefore not only revolutionary fighter who tried to save the Sikh Kingdom but also a recognized religious personage of high standing, true saint of the Sikh faith, who died the death of the martyr.

— Justice Choor Singh of Singapore, Bhai Maharaj Singh: Saint-Soldier of the Sikh Faith

=== Relics ===
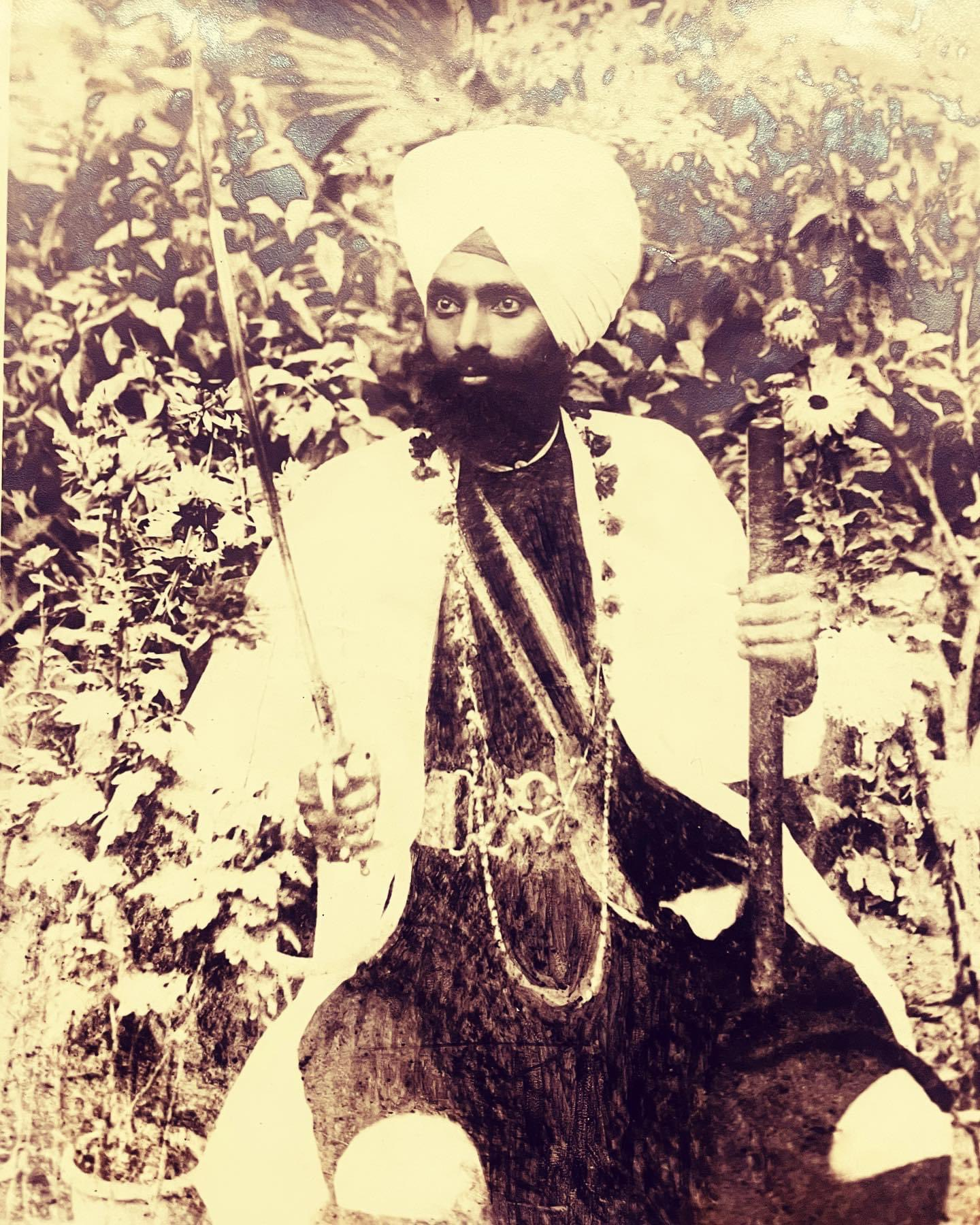
Photograph of Nanak Singh, son of Bhai Maharaj Singh. He can be seen posing in this photo holding the salotar (a type of sword) of Guru Gobind Singh and wearing the belt of Bhai Maharaj Singh.

Relics related to Maharaj Singh, such as personal belongings, manuscripts, paintings, photographs, weaponry, clothing, and others can be found held by the private collection of his direct descendants in Amritsar. They are safeguarded by a direct descendant in the fifth generation, Gursimranpal Singh, and another descendant, Gurrajpal Singh. They claim to have inherited values such as sant-sipahi, sewa, and simran from their ancestor.

The British Library's Indian collection holds items found on Maharaj Singh after he was captured, such as a seal stamp, conch which produces a battle-cry, and personal manuscripts.

== Resources ==
- THE SAINT SOLDIER - Uncovering the Bhai Maharaj Singh Story (Singapore's 1st Sikh, full documentary), produced by Upneet Kaur-Nagpal (1:00:00 length)
