= Bikram Singh Bedi =

Direct lineal descendant of Guru Nanak

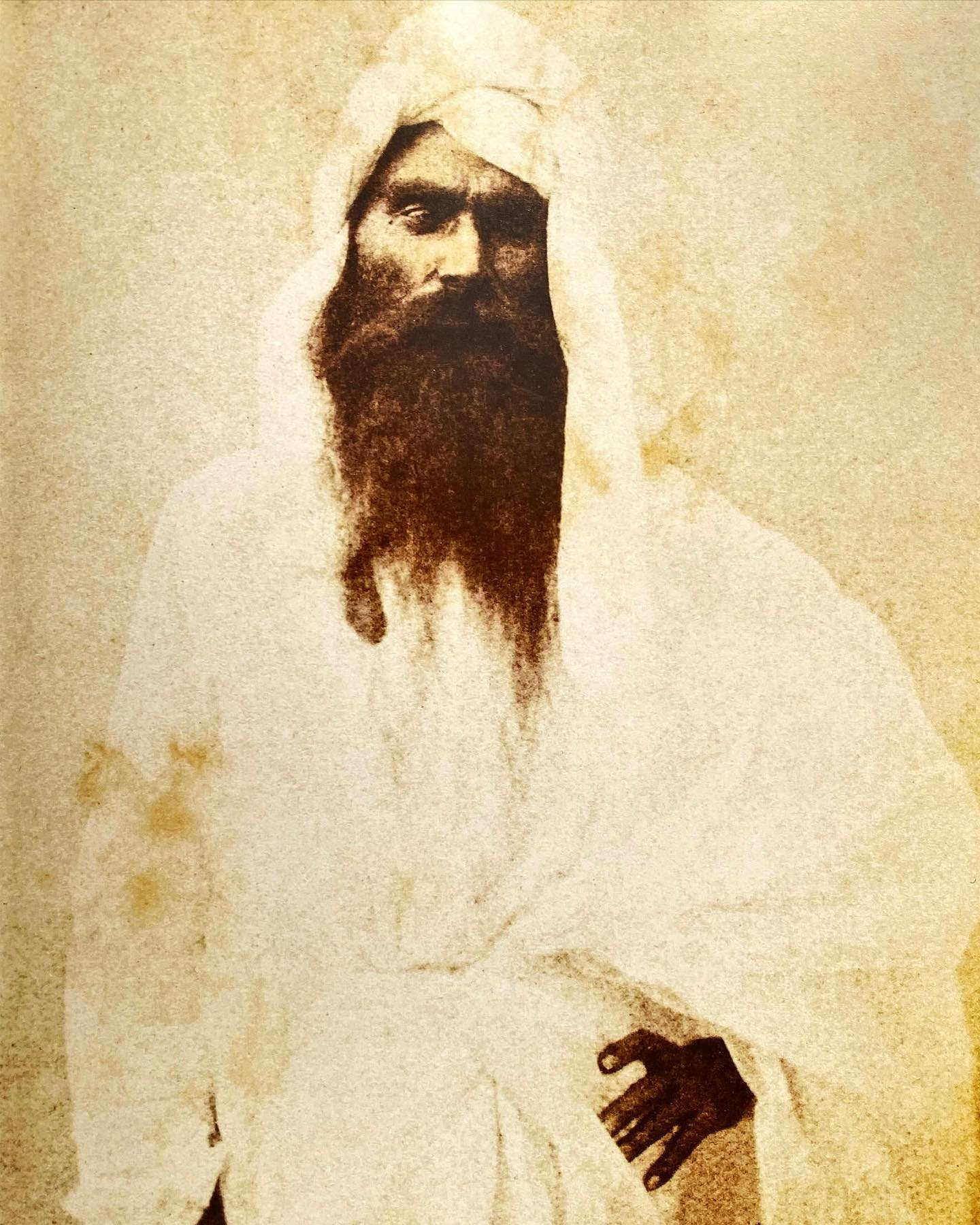
Photograph of Bikram Singh Bedi, a direct descendant of Guru Nanak, by John McCosh, Lahore, 1849

Bikram Singh Bedi (died 1862) was a direct lineal descendant of Guru Nanak who rebelled against the British-colonial administration during the Second Anglo-Sikh War and also during the initial years following the annexation of the Sikh Empire in 1849. (Note: His name is alternatively spelt as 'Bikrama', 'Vikram', or 'Vikrama'. He is also known as 'Bedi Bikram Singh of Una'.)

== Biography ==
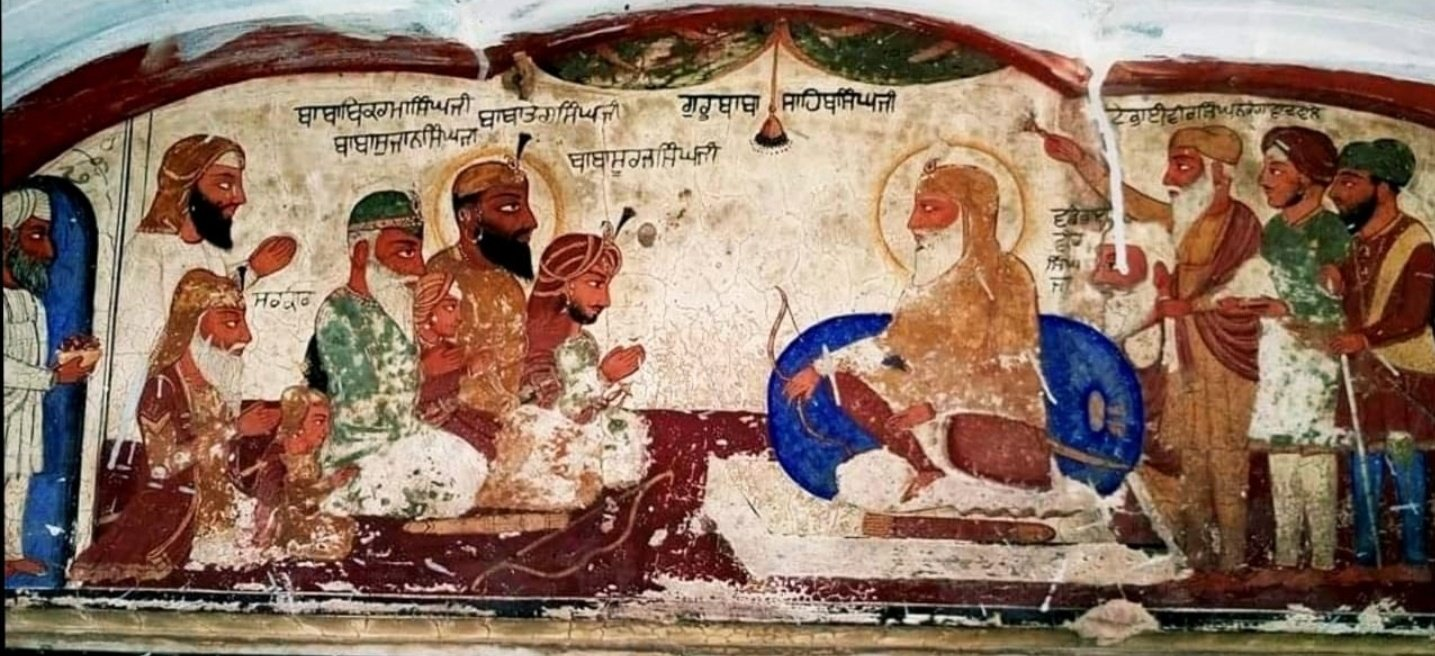
Mural depicting Sahib Singh Bedi with his sons and relatives (Suraj Singh, Attar Singh Bedi, and Bikram Singh Bedi, Sujan Singh), and Maharaja Ranjit Singh, from Asthan Baba Bikram Singh Bedi, Kanak Mandi, Amritsar, c. 1863–1879

He was the third and youngest son of Sahib Singh Bedi. Sahib Singh was a respected member of the Sikh society who had helped Maharaja Ranjit Singh consolidate his rule over Punjab. Bikram Singh was based in Una. After his father's death in 1834, Bikram Singh succeeded the family estate (jagir) in Una whilst his brother Bishan Singh succeeded the family estate in Kallar (Rawalpindi). He also took-on his late father's role as a religious instructor for the ruling dynasty of the Sikh Empire.

Bikram Singh was influenced by the Nirankari Sikh preacher, Baba Darbara Singh. He was also influenced by Bir Singh of Naurangabad, and was initiated by Bir Singh at Bir Singh's jatha. Bikram Singh had killed his brother Attar Singh on 25 November 1839 and killed his nephew on 3 December 1839, with him confiscating his nephew's estates. Bikram Singh had considered himself to be above the laws of the kingdom by-nature of his birth. In April 1840, Bikram Singh refused to release the family of his murdered relative, therefore Kunwar Nau Nihal Singh ordered General Ventura to capture the Dhukee Fort.

To atone for the murder of his brother, Bikram would wash his hands with rhinoceros excrement, particular that produced by a female rhino that was kept at the estate in Una which had been purchased for Rs. 2,500. In late 1840, when Bikram Singh was invited to Lahore to carry-out the enthronment ceremony by applying tilak on the new Sikh ruler, he refused when he discovered it would be applied to Chand Kaur, as Bikram Singh did not believe a woman should rule the Sikh kingdom, thinking he had been invited to apply it to Sher Singh. Bikram Singh was responsible for reconciling the Sandhanwalias and Maharaja Sher Singh in the presence of the Guru Granth Sahib. Eventually, Bikram became a powerful jagirdar, especially in the Jalandhar Doab, where he possessed 200,000 rupees and over 12 villages that had been granted to him by maharajas Sher Singh and Duleep Singh. He also held the fortresses of Nurpur, Gunachaur, and Dakkhni Sarai.

In the aftermath of the First Anglo-Sikh War, weaponry and part of the estate of Bikram Singh that was in the Jalandhar Doab was taken from him by the British and his fortress at Una was demolished. Bedi disliked that the British were stationed in Lahore in the aftermath of the war. This led to Bikram Singh, who had turned down a proposed pension that had been suggested by the British, to start planning an insurrection against the British in the Shivalik Hills, with him contacting Diwan Mul Raj about the matter in 1848. The British in-response wanted to banish Bedi from the Punjab permanently and be sent to live in Haridwar.

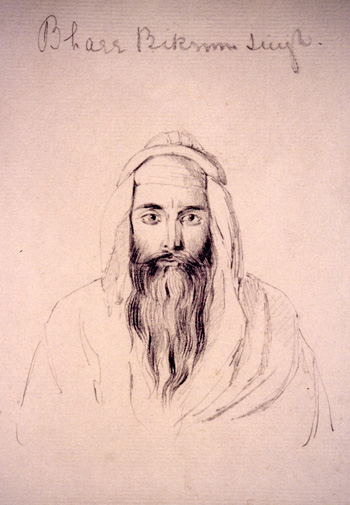
Sketch of Bikram Singh Bedi, the son of Sahib Singh Bedi, ca.1849

Bikram Singh Bedi helped arise the Sikh insurrection against the British East India Company at Jalandhar (Jullundur Doab) and Kangra. Bikram Singh marched toward Hoshiarpur but while he was at Maili, he heard the news of the defeat of the Raja of Jaswan State and therefore retreated to the camp of Sher Singh. Bedi and his forces crossed the Beas river in December 1848 and took part in the battles of Chillianwallah and Gujrat. Bedi and the Attariwala sardars surrendered to the British in March 1849 at Rawalpindi. In the aftermath of the Second Anglo-Sikh war, the British confiscated the property and possessions of Bikram Singh, with him being placed on parole at Amritsar where he lived on a British pension.

A calotype photograph of Bikram Singh was captured by John McCosh. In the period following the annexation of the Sikh kingdom, he was one of the few Sikh leaders who decided to assist Bhai Maharaj Singh in his insurrection against the new British administrators. In 1857, the 59th Regiment of the Bengal Native Infantry invaded Una and confiscated Bikram's rhino. Bedi died in Amritsar in 1862 or 1863.

== Legacy ==
A gurdwara dedicated to him located in Amritsar, Gurdwara Bābā Bikram Singh Bedi, is being renovated and restored by Virasati Asthan Seva.

== Lineage ==
The direct lineage going down to Bikram Singh Bedi from Guru Nanak is as follows:

1. Guru Nanak
2. Lakhmi Das
3. Dharam Chand
4. Mehar Chand/Manik Chand
5. Datār Chand
6. Pahar Chand
7. Harkaran Chand
8. Nihal Chand
9. Baba Kaladhari
10. Ajit Singh Bedi/Jit Singh
11. Sahib Singh Bedi
12. Bikram Singh Bedi
