= Amandeep Madra =

British historian, author and media commentator

Amandeep Madra OBE
- ਅਮਨਦੀਪ ਸਿੰਘ ਮਦਰਾ
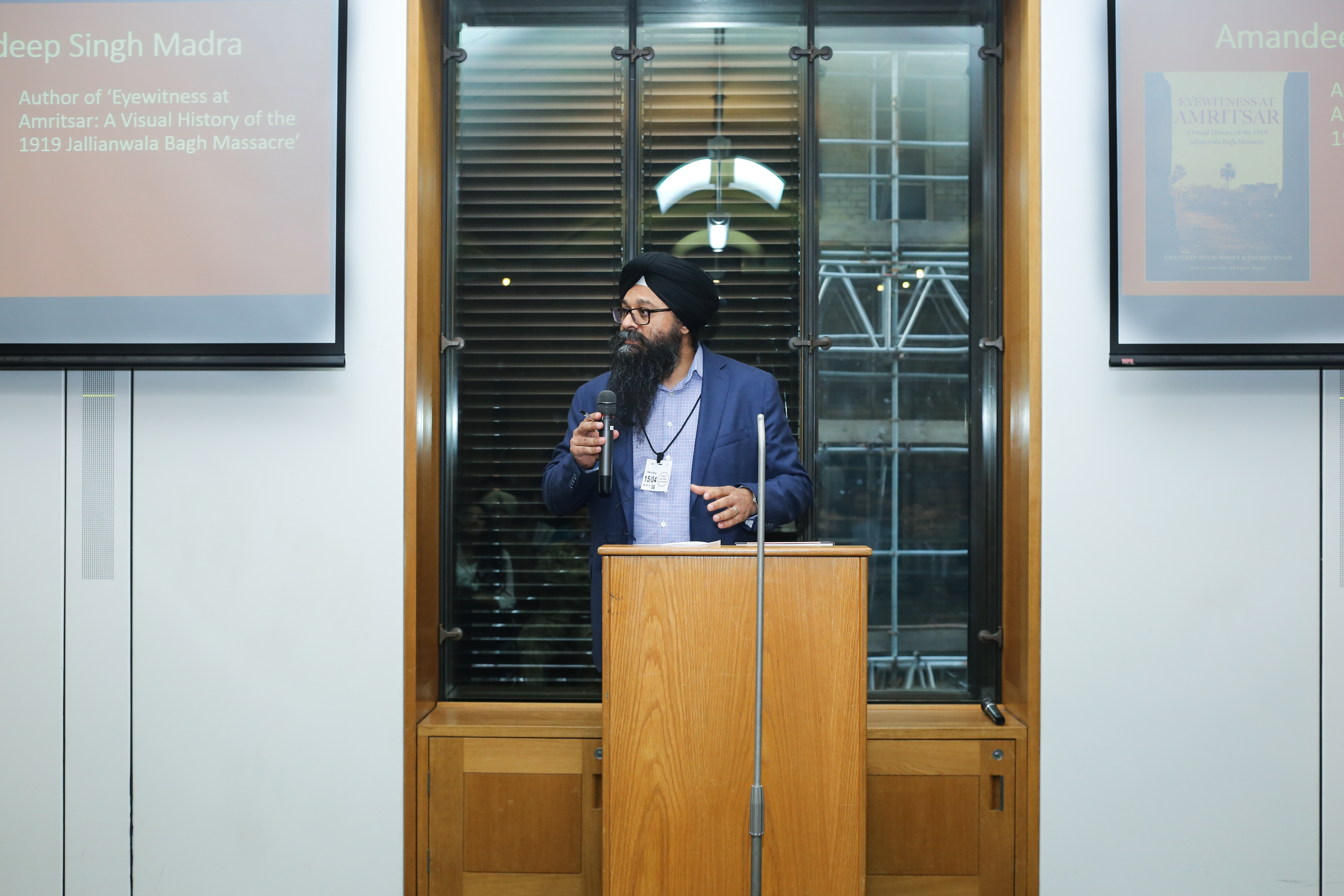
- Born: London
- Occupation: Chairman
- Years active: 2000–present
- Organization: UK Punjab Heritage Association
- Notable work: Author of 4 books on Sikh heritage

Amandeep Singh Madra OBE (Punjabi: ਅਮਨਦੀਪ ਸਿੰਘ ਮਦਰਾ) (born in London) is a historian, author and media commentator. He is associated with the United Kingdom Punjab Heritage Association (UKPHA).

== Early life ==
In his childhood growing up in West London in the 60s and 70s he was part of the generation that had to attend schools in different parts of London as part of a government policy to disperse Asian children.

== Career ==
Amandeep Madra is the CO-founder and chair for the UK Punjab Heritage Association, a non-profit organisation setup to preserve the heritage of Punjabi arts, literature, history and traditions.

He is co author of Warrior Saints and has featured in the BBC Radio 4 Beyond Belief podcast talking about the Amritsar Massacre, the BBC Radio 2 Good Morning Sunday show as curator of the exhibition "Empire, Faith & War: The Sikhs and World War One" in addition to the Sikh Channel talking about the 'Empire of the Sikhs' exhibition.

In 2021 he worked with the University of Greenwich to unveil the records of 320,000 Punjabi soldiers from World War 1 which he found in the depths of the Lahore Museum in Pakistan.

== Awards ==
He was awarded an OBE in the 2018 Queen's Birthday Honours List for services to Sikh and Punjabi Heritage and Culture.
