= Bir Singh of Naurangabad =

Sikh religious figure

Baba Bir Singh Ji
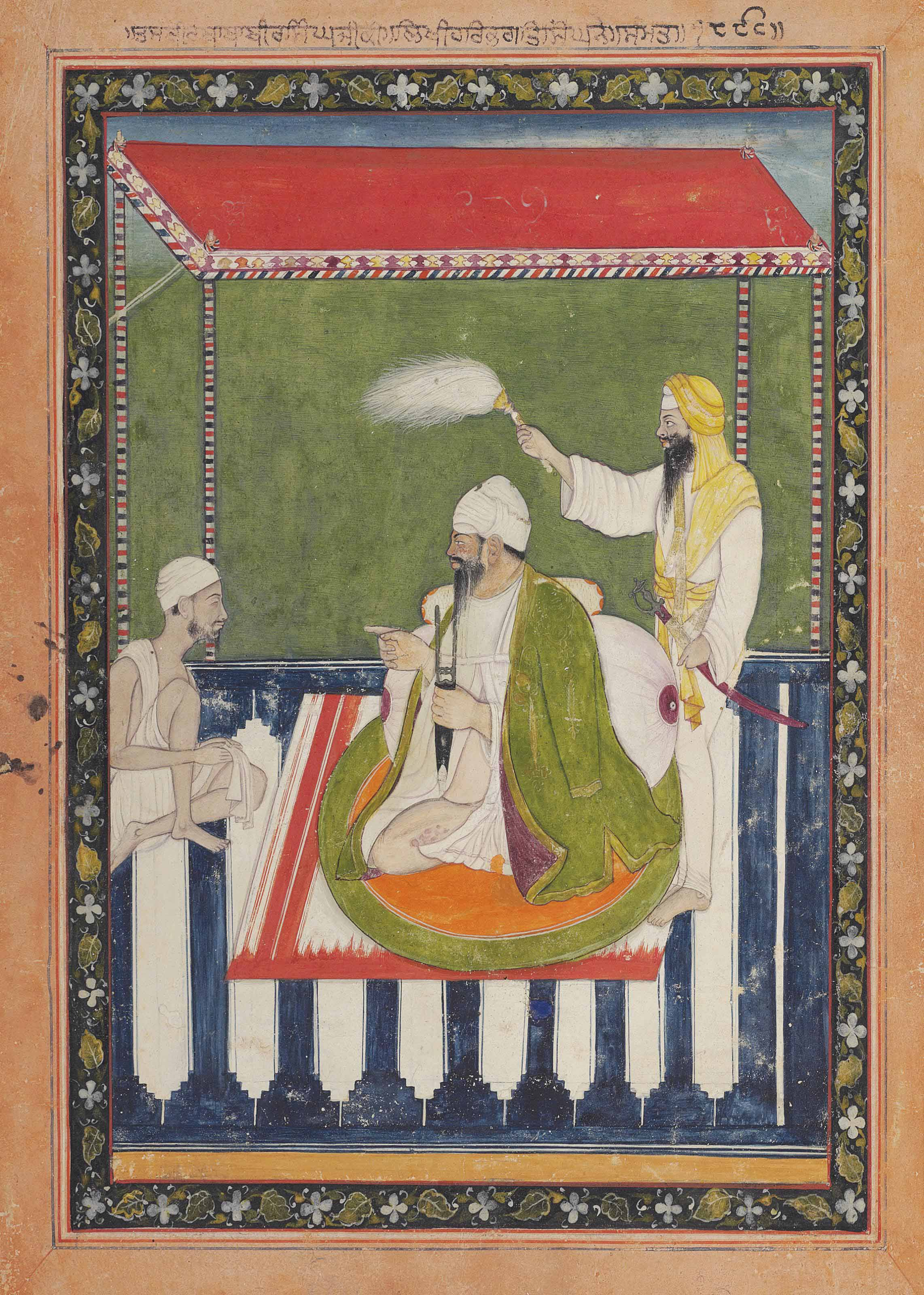
- Painting of Baba Bir Singh Naurangabad (centre) and Bhai Maharaj Singh (left), ca.1841–42

Bhai Daya Singh Samparda
- Preceded by: Baba Bhag Singh Ji Bedi (Kuri)
- Succeeded by: Baba Maharaj Singh Ji (Naurangabaad)

Religious life
- Religion: Sikhism

Baba Bir Singh of Naurangabad (Punjabi: ਬਾਬਾ ਬੀਰ ਸਿੰਘ ਜੀ, 1768–1844) was a prominent Sikh religious figure and a brahmgiani saint of the first half of the 19th century. He was a disciple of a disciple of Baba Sahib Singh of Una, a descendant of Guru Nanak, via Baba Bhag Singh of Kuri, belonging to a lineage of Sikh saints: Bhai Daya Singh Ji Samparda. Baba Bir Singh was a military officer in the Sikh Army of Maharaja Ranjit Singh, particularly in his early Kashmiri and Multani campaigns. He was part of the bhai tradition of Sikhism.

== Dera ==
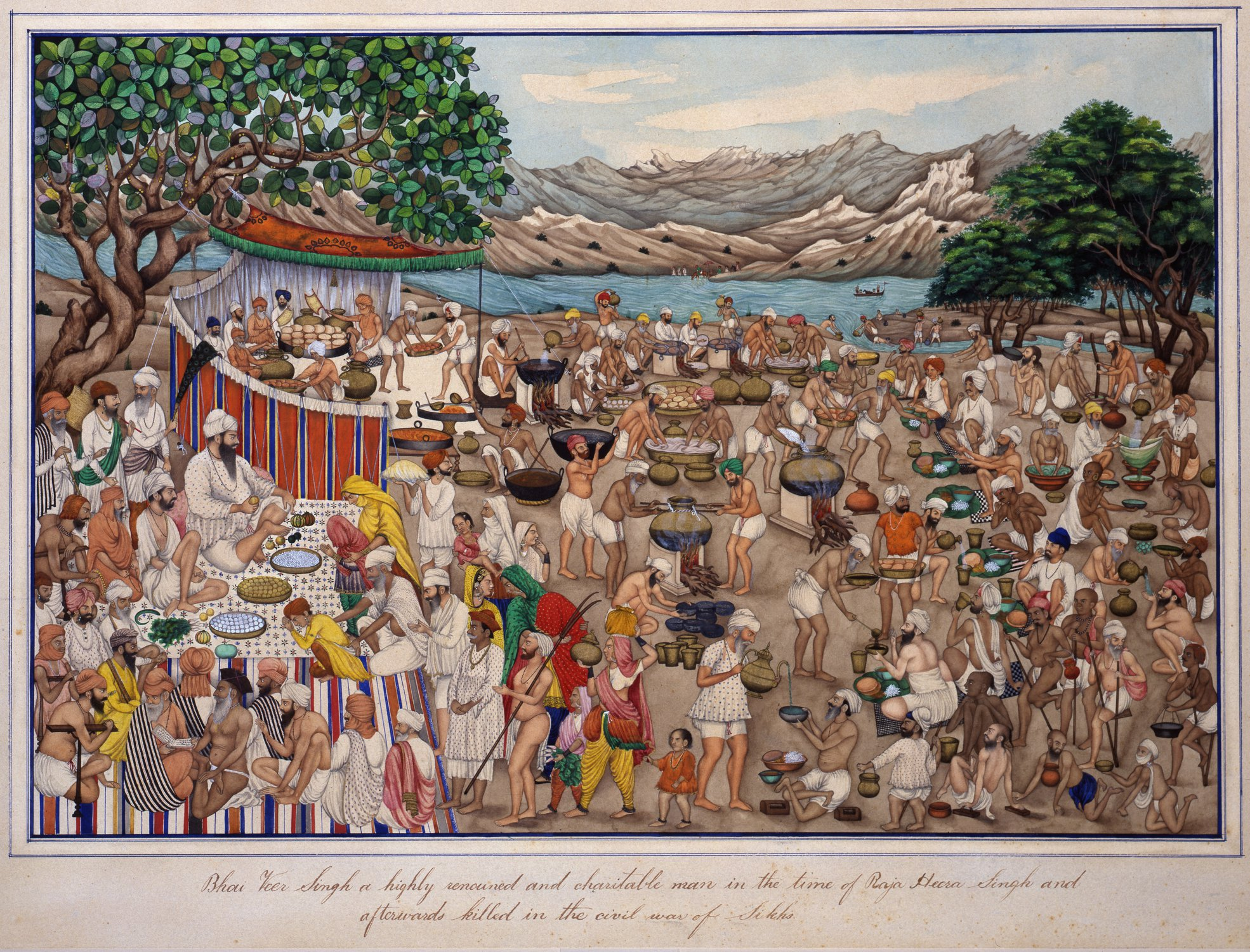
Painting of the camp of Bhai Bir Singh Naurangabad, Punjab, ca.1850

After leaving his military duties, Baba Bir Singh established and operated a dera (spiritual centre), based out of Naurangabad on the Sutlej, located near Tarn Taran. Baba ji had succeeded the Seva of the Bhai Daya Singh Samparda from Baba Bhag Singh ji, and guided countless Sikhs towards the teachings of Guru Nanak. The dera was known as Santpura. In 1833, Maharaja Ranjit Singh paid a visit to the dera of Bir Singh. After the death of Ranjit Singh in 1839, the dera of Bir Singh took-on a courtly atmosphere and Bir Singh became respected as a saint.

The dera had attracted Sikh soldiers and commoners, who viewed Bir Singh as a leader. Around 1,500 of people were fed at his dera on a daily basis, and many travelled from far to seek spiritual guidance. Baba Bir Singh had his own militia consisting of 1,200 musketeers and 3,000 horsemen.

=== Attack on his dera ===
In 1844, the followers of Bir Singh had swelled to 7,000 men, which upset the government in Lahore ran by Hira Singh Dogra, who was disgruntled by the number of Sikh soldiers of the Sikh Army joining the ranks of Bir Singh. Hira Singh had been a favourite of Maharaja Ranjit Singh when he was alive, thus after his passing he commanded a great deal of respect in the Sikh court, which allowed him to consolidate power. The Sandhawalias and Hira Singh wanted to install Duleep Singh as the new monarch but they had disagreements on who would take which positions in the court, which led to infighting. Hira Singh had a plan that he could rule as the de facto maharaja of the empire if he was appointed as the chief minister (wazir) of Duleep Singh. The installment of Duleep Singh to the Sikh throne was opposed by the older sons of Ranjit Singh, Peshaura Singh and Kashmira Singh, and also by Suchet Singh, the uncle of Hira Singh and ally of Jind Kaur. Hira Singh attempted to kill princes Peshaura Singh and Kashmira Singh via scheming with Gulab Singh, as he aimed to place the young Duleep Singh on the Sikh throne and rule indirectly as his wazir. Peshaura Singh and Kashmira Singh would both take refuge at the dera of Bir Singh after being attacked by the forces of Gulab Singh at Sialkot. Hira Singh would eventually turn on Gulab Singh as well in his push for power, whose son Sohan Singh was kept in Lahore as a hostage. The internal infighting of the court was kept in check by the Sikh Army's panches, however the military panches were very anti-British thus different factions used this to their advantage by claiming their opponent was part of a British conspiracy against the empire. The army panches was comprised primarily of religious Sikhs, of whom Bir Singh had a great influence over as a Sikh saint and former soldier. Attar Singh Sandhawalia also took refuge at the dera of Bir Singh after leaving British-controlled territory by crossing over the Sutlej. Other important figures that had been in-communication with Bir Singh were Lehna Singh Majithia, Sham Singh Attariwala, and Khushal Singh. Therefore, the dera of Bir Singh became a centre-point of a movement against the Dogra-dominated central government of the empire. After an earthquake that took place in Lahore and Amritsar on 9 April 1844, it was taken as a bad omen for the future and many crowds sought refuge at the camp of Bir Singh. Hira Singh used the fact that Attar Singh Sandhawalia had sought refuge at the dera to rile the anglophobic Sikh army panches to attack, as Attar Singh had been residing in British-controlled territory for six months prior, which drew suspicions of a British conspiracy. Thus, Hira Singh managed to convince the Khalsa panches to attack the dera since Bir Singh and the two Sikh princes who took refuge there would therefore be traitors for conspiring with Attar Singh, which Hira Singh had convinced them was influenced by the British.

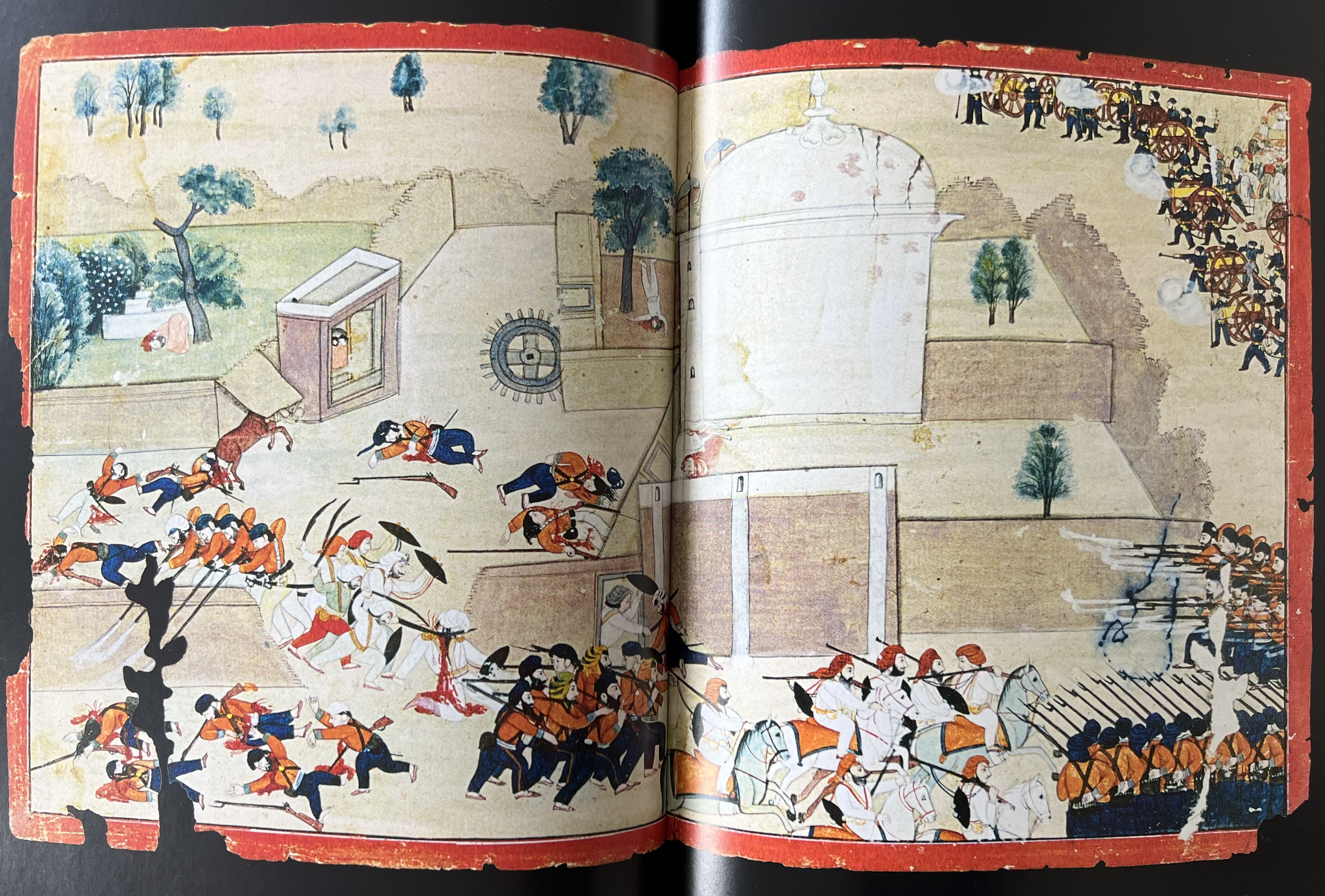
Painting of the attack on Baba Bir Singh of Naurangabad's camp (dera), gouache, Sikh school, Punjab Plains, circa mid-19th century

All of this would culminate in a military attack on the dera of Bir Singh on 7 May 1844 commanded by Mian Labh Singh on the orders of Hira Singh under the pretext of arresting Bir Singh, which led to the deaths of Bir Singh and a Sikh prince, Kashmira Singh, who had sought refuge at Bir Singh's dera. Initially, Bir Singh invited the Durbar troops within the dera and attempted to broker peace between them and his two guests, Attar Singh and Kashmira Singh. He had five hundred goats slaughtered to feed the Durbar troops. However, during this process, Attar Singh lost his temper and killed one of the Durbar military leaders, Gulab Singh Kalkattea, which led to open hostilities.

The camp of Bir Singh was under bombardment by the Durbar artillery and the regiment of General Court took a leading role in the attack. Baba Bir Singh prohibited his followers from attacking "our own brothers" and sat in meditation. At the end of the fighting, six hundred men were killed, including Kashmira Singh and Attar Singh. Bir Singh had been hit by a cannon-ball on his thigh and later died. Bir Singh's body was discarded in the Sutlej river. The Durbar troops soon became remorseful after killing the religious figure and many civilians who were seeking refuge in the dera and they were called gurumar ("killers of the guru").

Mian Labh Singh in the aftermath arrested Rani Daya Kaur, the widow of Ranjit Singh and mother of princes Kashmira and Peshaura Singh. Thus, some Durbar troops rebelled and freed the arrested queen by shooting the Dogra colonel watching over her. Mian Labh Singh had to flee from the rebelling soldiers.

Peshaura Singh, another Sikh prince, had also been residing at the dera but had already left it before the attack and fled to Ludhiana to seek British protection. The popularity and prestige of Hira Singh declined due to his attack and killing of the popular saint Bir Singh. Hira Singh attempted to placate the angry Khalsa panches by giving 5,000 rupees for a Karah Prashad in Bir Singh's memory and announcing his intention to become a Khalsa Sikh via the baptismal ceremony. However, Hira Singh's action against Bir Singh, with addition to the unpopular antics of Misr Jalla (who was greatly disliked), led the army panches demanding the surrender of Hira Singh, who attempted to flee to the Punjab Hills and was killed on 21 December 1844.

== Disciples ==
Baba Bir Singh Ji belonged to the lineage of Bhai Daya Singh Ji Samparda, a spiritual lineage tracing back to the first of the 5 Pyare, Bhai Daya Singh. Baba Bir Singh Ji had many followers, who sought out spiritual guidance and teachings of Naam and Gurbani from him. One of his disciples, Baba Maharaj Singh ji, inherited the Seva of the Samparda. However, he was arrested by the British after annexation, and was regarded as a saint by not just the Sikh followers, but also the British soldiers who had seen miracles associated with him.

The lineage was then succeeded by Baba Ram Singh Virakt who preached the teachings of Guru Nanak from village to village. This Sampardaya later had saints like Sant Karam Singh (Hoti Mardan), Sant Isher Singh (Rara Sahib), and Sant Ranjit Singh Virakt, who spread the teachings of Gurbani across India and beyond.
