= Sahib Singh Bedi =

Descendant of Guru Nanak

Baba Sahib Singh Bedi
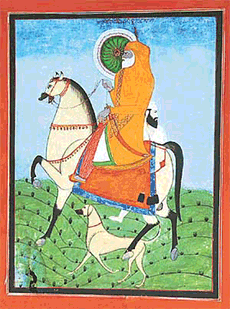
- Pahari equestrian miniature painting of Sahib Singh Bedi, circa 19th century

Bhai Daya Singh Samparda
- Preceded by: Baba Sobha Singh (Anandpur Sahib)
- Succeeded by: Baba Bhag Singh (Kuri)

Personal life
- Born: 7 April 1756 Dera Baba Nanak, Punjab
- Died: 17 July 1834 (aged 78) Una, Himachal Pradesh
- Children: Bishan Singh; Bikram Singh; Attar Singh
- Parent(s): Baba Ajit Singh Bedi; Mata Sarupan Devi
- Known for: Brahmgiani Saint; Direct Descendant of Guru Nanak Dev ji; Being a central figure in establishing the Sikh Empire; Preaching the teachings of the Sikh Guru to the masses, initiating countless into Khalsa; Head of Bhai Daya Singh Samparda; Rajguru of the Sikh Empire

Religious life
- Religion: Sikhism

Baba Sahib Singh Bedi (Punjabi: ਬਾਬਾ ਸਾਹਿਬ ਸਿੰਘ ਜੀ ਬੇਦੀ, 7 April 1756 – 17 July 1834) was a renowned Sikh Brahmgiani Saint, who was a direct tenth-generation lineal descendant of Guru Nanak, the first Sikh Guru.

== Early life ==
Baba Sahib Singh Bedi was born to parents Baba Ajit Singh Bedi (died 1773) and Mata Sarupan Devi on 7 April 1756 at Dera Baba Nanak (in present-day Gurdaspur district) in the traditional Punjabi month of Chet sudi. His birth is said to be prophesised by Guru Gobind Singh, the tenth Guru of the Sikhs. Ajit Singh, Sahib Singh's father, had been baptized by Guru Gobind Singh himself. In 1770, his family shifted from Dera Baba Nanak to Una located at the foothills of the Sivalik Hills region (in present-day Himachal Pradesh), where they held land. His grandfather, Baba Kaladhari (died 1737), had been the one to establish the Bedi family at Una earlier in 1695 and Ajit Singh was the one who constructed a family-compound at the location.

When he was around 18 years old (c.1774), Sahib Singh Bedi visited Anandpur Sahib, where he was initiated into the Khalsa by Baba Sobha Singh of Bhai Daya Singh Samparda, who was a beloved Sikh of Guru Gobind Singh. Sobha Singh was given the duty of taking care of Takht Sri Kesgarh Sahib by the tenth Guru, becoming known as Jathedar Baba Sobha Singh amongst the Sikhs. He preached the message and the teachings of Sikhi and initiated many into the Khalsa through Amrit Sanskar.

== Later life ==
According to one account, Sahib Singh Bedi attacked and destroyed Maler.

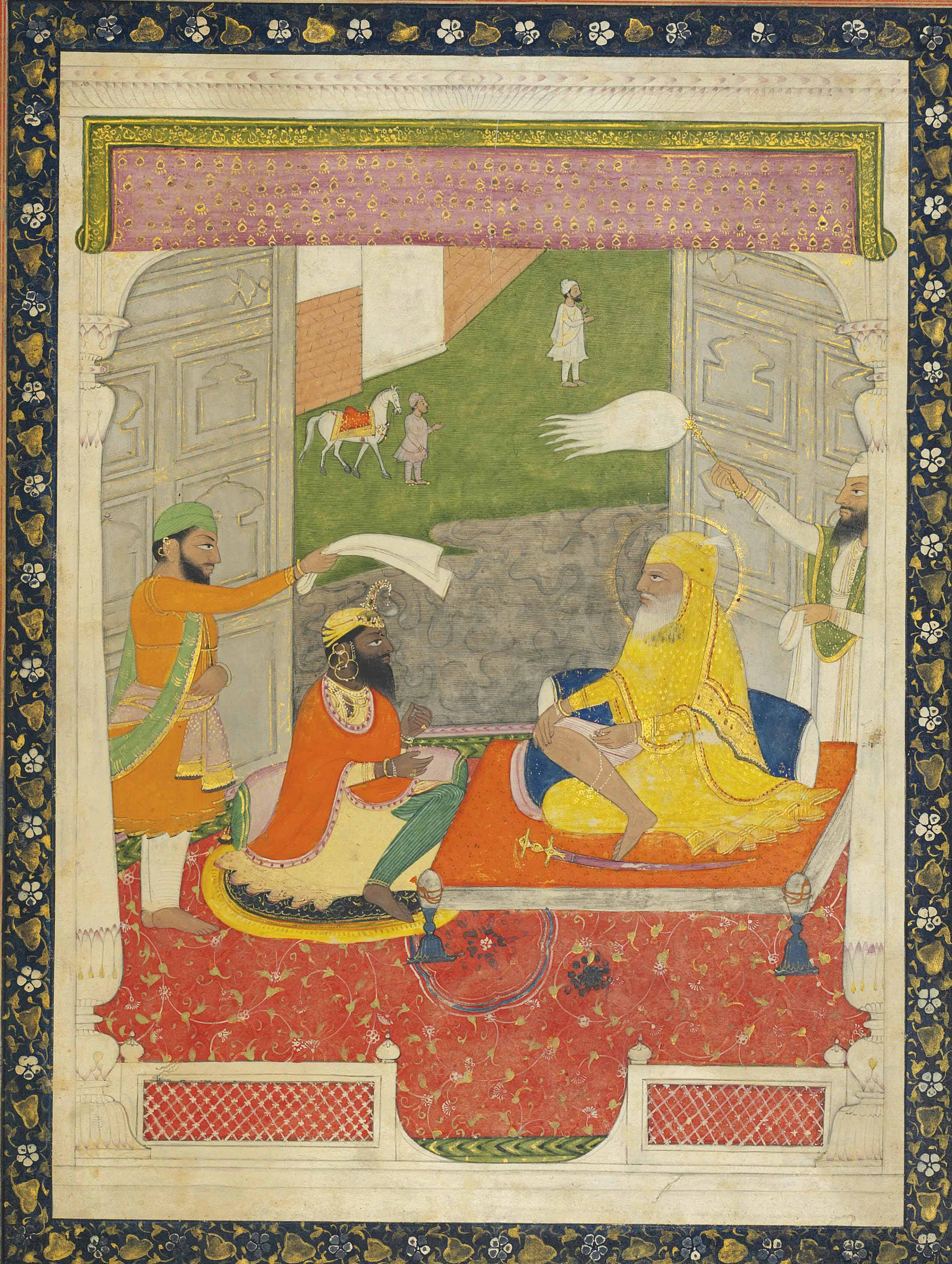
Painting of Sahib Singh Bedi (seated right) seated with his son, Tegh Singh Bedi (seated left), North India, dated 1838–39 CE

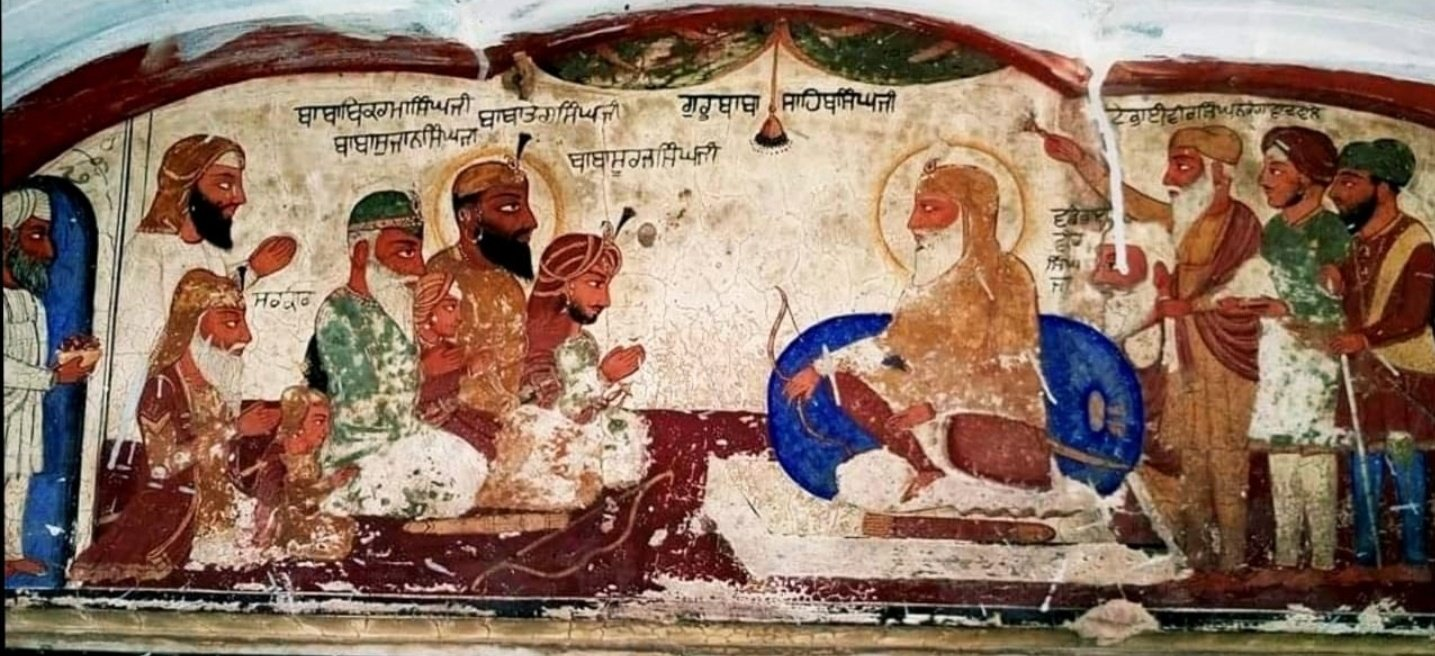
Mural of Sahib Singh Bedi with his sons and relatives (Suraj Singh, Attar Singh, and Bikram Singh Bedi, Sujan Singh), and Maharaja Ranjit Singh at Asthan Baba Bikram Singh Bedi, Kanak Mandi, Amritsar

Baba Sahib Singh Bedi was greatly respected by the Sikh misldars (chiefs) during the era of the Sikh Confederacy and acted as a common uniting cause between the various bickering, rival chiefs against an outside enemy. He played a pivotal role in the unification of the Sikh Misls and the establishment of the Sikh Empire. Furthermore, Baba Sahib Singh was responsible for applying the tilak and saffron paste during the coronation ceremony of Maharaja Ranjit Singh on 11th or 12th April 1801 in Lahore.

Baba Sahib Singh was respected as the Rajguru of the Sikh Empire, admired by not only the Maharaja and the Sikhs, but also the non-Sikh population. He was also the founder of the locality of Bedian located near Lahore on tracts of land allotted to him by Maharaja Ranjit Singh. He established a Sikh religious educational school at Bedian, partly choosing this location to combat the rival heretic Mina sect, founded by the disgruntled and rebellious Prithi Chand, which was headquartered at Heir village nearby. Baba Sahib Singh is renowned for preaching the teachings of the Sikh Gurus to the masses, initiating countless into Khalsa.

Baba Sahib Singh died on 17 July 1834 in Una. He was survived by two sons, Bishan Singh and Bikram Singh. His many students included Baba Bhag Singh of Kuri, who was given Amrit by Baba Sahib Singh himself.

== Legacy ==
Sahib Singh Bedi succeeded the Samparda of Bhai Daya Singh from Baba Sobha Singh of Anandpur, a lineage of saints tracing back to Bhai Daya Singh, the first of the original Panj Pyare. Bhai Sher Singh wrote a 19th century text on saints of this lineage, which includes the biographies of Sahib Singh Bedi and his successors: Baba Bhag Singh of Kuri, Baba Bir Singh of Naurangabaad and Bhai Khuda Singh. Bhai Sher Singh himself was a disciple of Bhai Khuda Singh. The later saints of this Samparda include Sant Karam Singh of Hoti Mardan, and Sant Isher Singh of Rara Sahib.

Sobha Ram wrote a Gurbilas text on Sahib Singh Bedi called Gurbilas Baba Sahib Singh Bedi. In the text, supernatural powers are attributed to Sahib Singh. Furthermore, Sahib Singh is portrayed not only as a descendant of Guru Nanak but also as an incarnation of Guru Gobind Singh.

The samadh of Sahib Singh Bedi is located in Una, Himachal Pradesh. Gurdwara Damdama Sahib in Gujranwala, Pakistan is dedicated to him but now has been re-purposed as a private residence for a Muslim family from Patiala and is in risk of collapse.

== Lineage ==
The direct lineage going down to Sahib Singh Bedi from Guru Nanak is as follows:

1. Guru Nanak
2. Lakhmi Das
3. Dharam Chand
4. Mehar Chand/Manik Chand
5. Datār Chand
6. Pahar Chand
7. Harkaran Chand
8. Nihal Chand
9. Baba Kaladhari
10. Ajit Singh Bedi/Jit Singh
11. Sahib Singh Bedi

== See also ==
- Khem Singh Bedi
