= Gurdwara Karamsar Rara Sahib =

Gurdwara in Punjab, India

Gurudwara Karamsar Sahib
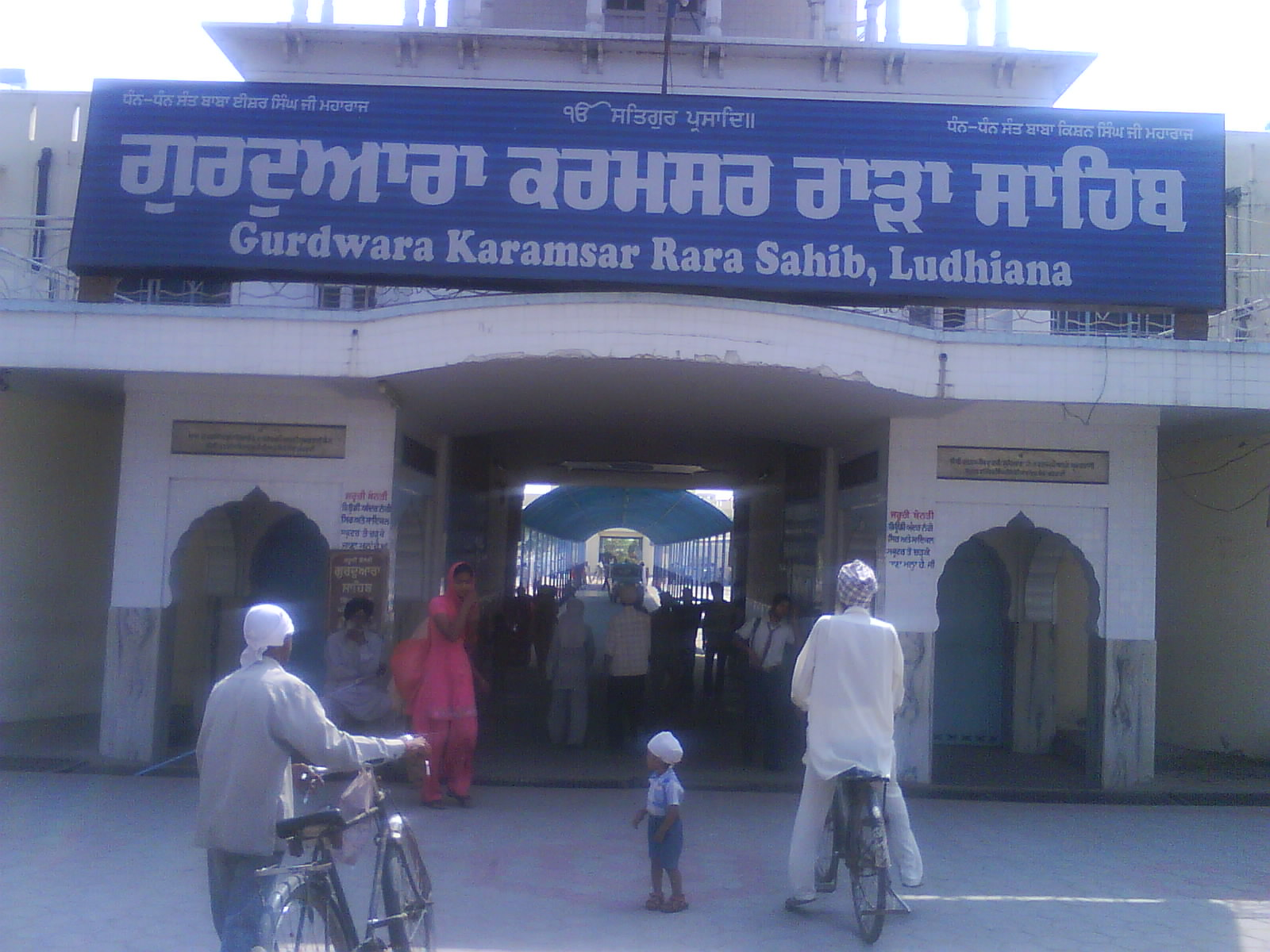
- Gurdwara Karamsar Rara Sahib

Religion
- Affiliation: Sikhism

Location
- Location: Rara Sahib
- Interactive map of Gurudwara Karamsar Sahib
- Coordinates: 30.7276°N 75.9473°E

Architecture
- Style: Sikh architecture

Gurdwara Karamsar (Punjabi: ਗੁਰਦੁਆਰਾ ਕਰਮਸਰ) is a prominent Sikh gurdwara complex in Rara Sahib, Ludhiana district, Punjab, India, attributed to Sant Isher Singh Ji and Sant Kishen Singh Ji, two Brahmgiani Sikh saints of the 20th century.

Gurdwara Karamsar was established in 1936 and was named after Sant Karam Singh Ji, a revered saint of Hoti Mardan and the predecessor of Sant Attar Singh Ji of Reru Sahib, who was the teacher of Sant Isher Singh Ji and Sant Kishen Singh Ji.

== History ==
The spiritual significance of the village Rara Sahib was elevated following the visit of the sixth Sikh Guru, Guru Hargobind Sahib Ji, transforming it from the simple village of Rara to Rara Sahib.

Both Sant Isher Singh Ji and Sant Kishen Singh Ji were disciples of Sant Attar Singh Ji of Reru Sahib, a revered saint of the Bhai Daya Singh Samparda. This Sikh institution was founded by Bhai Daya Singh, one of the original Panj Pyare, under the Hukam of Guru Gobind Singh Ji. Under Sant Attar Singh ji's guidance, they dedicated themselves to Seva (selfless service) and Bhagati (spiritual devotion). Both Sant Isher Singh Ji and Sant Kishan Singh Ji succeeded Sant Attar Singh Ji, and through their immense contributions to the Sikh faith, this Samparda came to be known as the Rara Sahib Samparda as well.

After the passing of Sant Attar Singh Ji, Sant Isher Singh Ji and Sant Kishan Singh Ji departed from Gurdwara Reru Sahib and eventually settled in the forests of Rara Sahib. At the request of Sardar Gian Singh Rarewala, they made this once desolate village their spiritual abode. Gurdwara Karamsar became a center of worship and penance for His Holiness Sant Isher Singh Ji and His Holiness Sant Kishen Singh ji, where they tirelessly devoted himself to God. Immersing themselves in Simran and Samadhi (deep meditation) for a long time, they transformed the once-remote forest into what is now known as Gurdwara Karamsar, a revered spiritual center where Sikhs gather to learn, meditate, worship, and engage in Seva (selfless service).

To construct the Gurdwara, although most of the land was purchased, a portion of the land was generously donated by nearby villagers,. With its establishment, the sacred recitation of hymns began every morning and evening, and Langar was prepared and served to all. Devotees' enthusiasm grew, leading to the regular observance of Sangrand (monthly gathering) and Pooranmashi (full-moon day) with deep religious devotion and fervor.

=== Places associated with Rara Sahib Samparda ===
Over 100 Gurdwaras around the world are connected to the Rara Sahib Samparda, spanning Punjab, Haryana, the UK, Europe, Africa and North America. These Gurdwaras are associated with the legacy and teachings of Sant Isher Singh Ji and Sant Kishern Singh Ji, and contribute to continuation of the Parchaar (propagation) of Sikhi across generations.

Some of the Gurdwaras associated with Rara Sahib Samparda are:

- Gurdwara Sant Ashram, Dhablan; established in 1954 by Sant Isher Singh ji.
- Gurdwara Janam Asthan, Allowal; This Gurdwara stands in the village where Sant Isher Singh Ji was born. Each year, on August 5, his birth anniversary is commemorated with great devotion and enthusiasm by countless Sikhs.
- Gurdwara Janam Asthan, Masitan, Haryana; This Gurdwara stands in the village where Sant Kishen Singh Ji was born.
- Crowther Road, Wolverhampton: The house where Sant Isher Singh Ji passed away is located on this road. With the presence of the Guru Granth Sahib, it serves as a Gurdwara. Many Sikhs, including prominent Sikh personalities, visit this sacred site to pay their respects and honor the legacy of Sant Isher Singh Ji.
- Gurdwara Sant Ashram Ishersar Sahib, Fatehgarh Panjgaraian: This Gurdwara is named after Sant Isher Singh Ji and was established by one of his esteemed disciples and a revered Sikh saint, Sant Ranjit Singh Virakt, who arrived here under the Hukam of Sant Isher Singh Ji himself. It is among the earliest Gurdwaras of the Rara Sahib Samparda, which was established with the blessings of Sant Kishan Singh ji. Since the first Barsi (death anniversary) in 1976, Sant Kishan Singh Ji personally visited this sacred site each year to commemorate the occasion.
- Gurdwara Yaadgaar Sant Isher Singh ji, Rara Sahib Jarg.

== Location ==
Gurdwara Karamsar is located in the village of Rara Sahib. Situated 22 km southeast of Ludhiana, 14 km northeast of Ahmedgarh, and 22 km northwest of Khanna, Rara Sahib lies along the Chawa-Payal-Ahmedgarh road, on the banks of the Bathinda branch of the Sirhind Canal.

== Image gallery ==
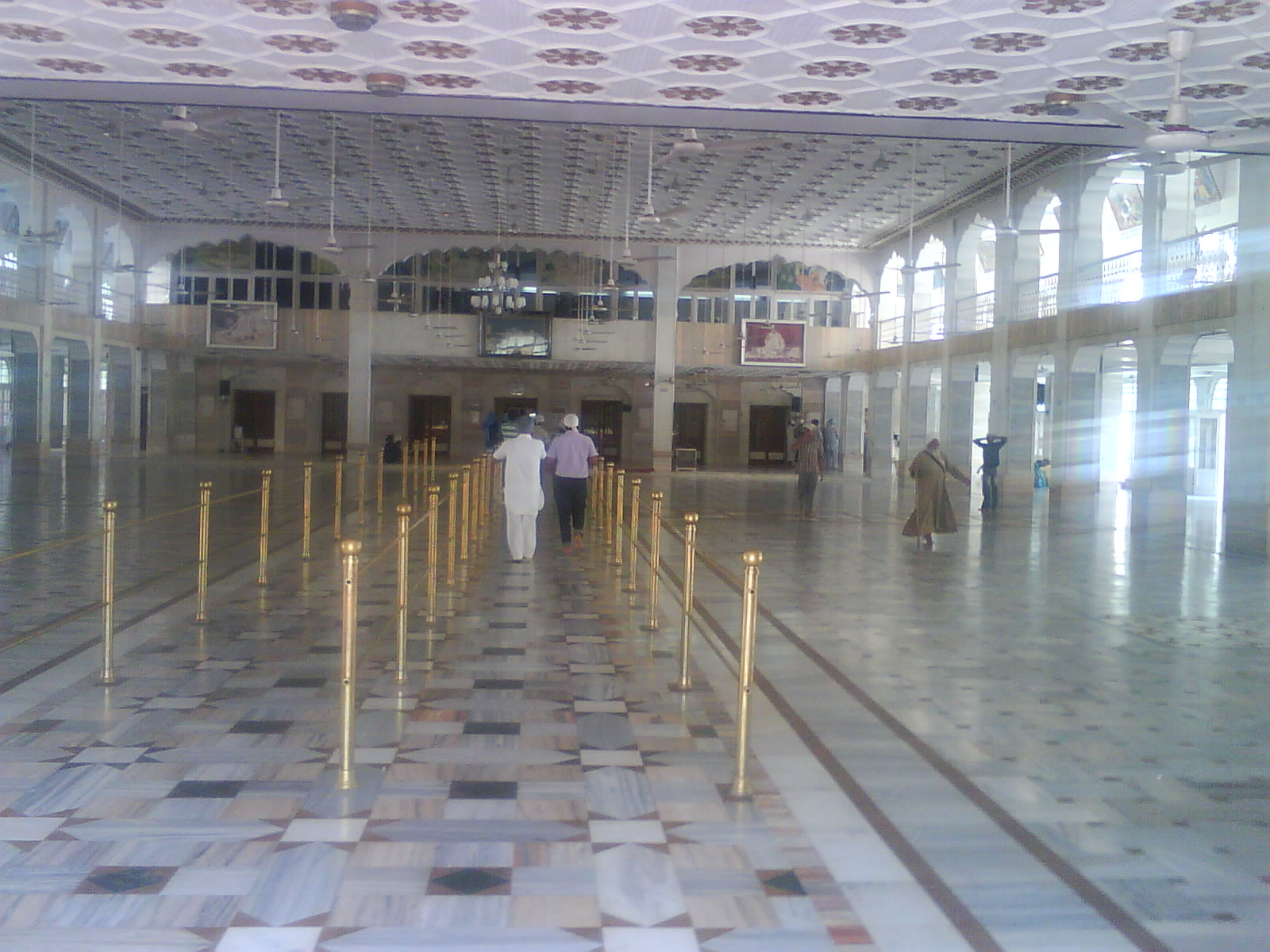
Hall of Gurdwara Karamsar, Rara Sahib

== See also ==
- Gurdwaras in India
- Rara Sahib
- Sant Isher Singh
