= Rara Sahib =

- Location in Punjab, India
- Coordinates: 30.727°N 75.946°E
- Country: India
- State: Punjab
- District: Ludhiana
- Time zone: UTC+5:30 (IST)
- Nearest city: Payal, India

Rara Sahib is a village in the Ludhiana district of Punjab, India. Its spiritual significance was elevated following the visit of the sixth Sikh Guru, Guru Hargobind Sahib ji Ji, transforming it from the simple village of Rara to Rara Sahib.

Situated 22 km southeast of Ludhiana, 14 km northeast of Ahmedgarh, and 22 km northwest of Khanna, Rara Sahib lies along the Chawa-Payal-Ahmedgarh road, on the banks of the Bathinda branch of the Sirhind Canal.

In recent times, the village has gained prominence due to the spiritual devotion of Sant Isher Singh Ji and Sant Kishan Singh Ji, two revered Brahmgiani Sikh Saints of the 20th century. Their years of deep meditation and Seva in this sacred place have further enriched its spiritual significance. At the request of Sardar Gian Singh Rarewala, they chose to reside in Rara Sahib, transforming what was once a desolate place into their abode. Subsequently, a grand Gurdwara complex, known as Gurdwara Karamsar, was established near the village, a revered spiritual center where Sikhs gather to learn, meditate, worship, and engage in Seva (selfless service).

In remembrance of the saints' legacy, a school and a hospital were established in the village by the Gurdwara Karamsar Rara Sahib Trust.

== See also ==
- Gurdwara Karamsar Rara Sahib
- Sant Isher Singh
