= Balewal =

- Village
- Interactive map of Balewal
- Coordinates: 30°35′12.10″N 75°52′52.92″E
- Country: India
- State: Punjab
- District: Malerkotla
- Tehsil: Ahmedgarh

Government
  - Type: Panchayat raj
  - Body: Gram panchayat

Languages
  - Official: Punjabi
- Time zone: UTC+5:30 (IST)
- Telephone code: 01675
- PIN: 148019
- ISO 3166 code: IN-PB
- Vehicle registration: PB-28

Balewal is a village in Malerkotla in Malerkotla district of Punjab State, India. The village is administrated by Sarpanch an elected representative of the village.

== See also ==
- List of villages in India
