= Nathumajra =

Nathu Majra
- Nathumajra
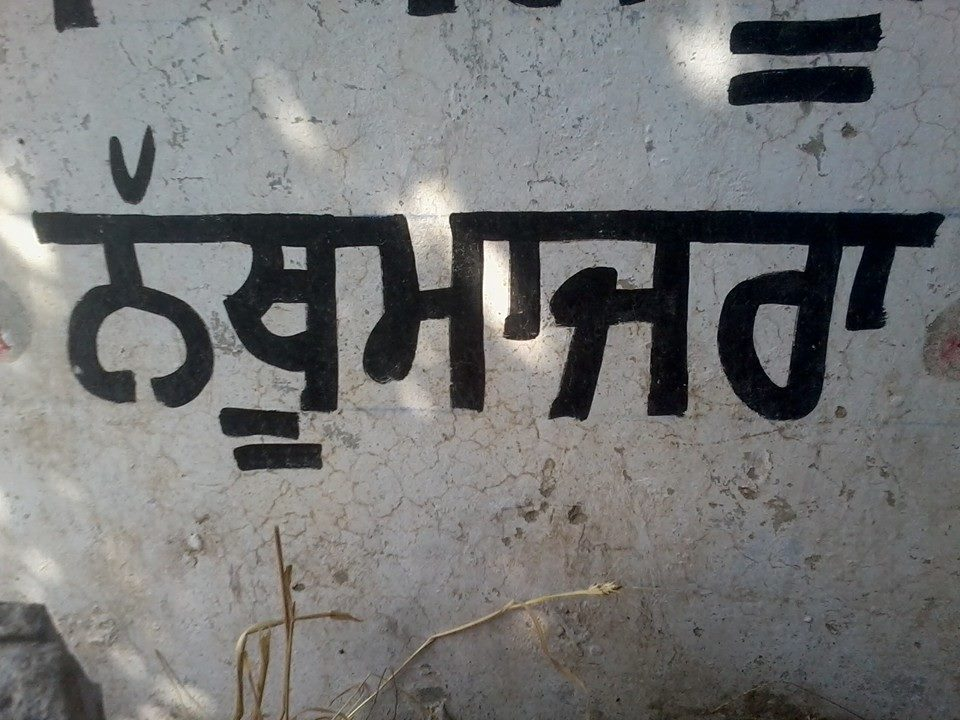
- Entrance sign of village Nathumajra in Punjabi language

- Location in Punjab, India Nathu Majra (India)
- Coordinates: 30.648758°N 75.879837°E
- Country: India
- State: Punjab
- District: Malerkotla
- Established: Medieval India

Government
  - Type: Gram Panchayat

Population (2011)
  - Total: 1,390

Languages
  - Official: Punjabi
- Time zone: UTC+5:30 (IST)
- PIN: 148021
- Vehicle registration: PB-82
- Literacy: 82.06 %

Nathumajra is a village in the Malerkotla district of Punjab, India. Formerly a part of the Sangrur district, it is located in the Ahmedgarh tehsil. It is situated 15 kilometres (9.3 mi) away from district headquarter Malerkotla. As per 2016 stats, Nathu Majra village is also a gram panchayat.

== History ==
Nathumajra Traces its history back to Medieval India, however its current landscape was formed after the partition of India and Pakistan following the Indian independence movement.

== Geography ==
Nathumajra lies in a fertile, alluvial plain with an irrigation canal system. It extends from the latitudes 30.648758° North to longitudes 75.879837° East.

=== Climate ===
The geography and subtropical latitudinal location of Nathumajra leads to large variations in temperature from month to month. It experience temperatures around 5 °C (41 °F) from December to February {winter season}, ground frost is commonly found in the village during the winter season. The temperature rises gradually with high humidity and overcast skies. However, the rise in temperature is steep when the sky is clear and humidity is low. The maximum temperatures usually occur in mid-May and June {summer season}. The temperature remains above 40 °C (104 °F) during this period.

== Politics ==
Update Data as per new panchayati elections 2024

As per constitution of India and Panchayati raj (India) Act, Nathu Majra village is administrated by panchayat secretary and BDO along with seven elected panch or gram panchayat members of village Nathumajra are Manmohan Singh, Sandeep Singh, Amrik Singh, Prabhjot Singh, Ramandeep Kaur, Sandeep Kaur and Manjeet kaur out of which Ramandeep kaur won by largest margin of 36 votes from her elected ward and lowest wargin is counted on ward no 2 which was won by Manmohan singh by 3 votes.

== Demographics ==
Nathu Majra is a medium size village located in Malerkotla of Sangrur district, Punjab, with total 289 families residing. Nathu Majra has a population of 1390 of which 725 are males while 665 are females as per Population Census 2011. In Nathu Majra, population of children with age 0-6 is 119 which makes up 8.56% of total population of village. Average Sex Ratio of the village is 917 which is higher than Punjab state average of 895. Child Sex Ratio for the village as per census is 951, higher than Punjab average of 846.

== Education ==
Nathumajra has one Primary school, one Middle school and one Senior Secondary school. The village has higher literacy rate compared to Punjab. In 2011, literacy rate of village was 82.06% compared to 75.84% of Punjab. In Nathu Majra Male literacy stands at 89.01% while female literacy rate was 74.46%.

== Sports ==
Punjabi Kabaddi, Cricket and Volleyball {Volleyball variations#Shooting volleyball} are the three most popular sports played in Nathumajra.
