= Bathinda Branch =

The Bathinda Branch is a canal branch of the Sirhind Canal that irrigates much of the region of Malwa in Punjab, India. Much of the irrigation in present-day Bathinda district is fed by the Bathinda Branch, providing drinking water to 179 villages of Bathinda district, and irrigates 4.2 lakh hectares. It flows through the city of Bathinda. The canal is 152.40 km long and has a discharge of 2,890 cusecs. It originates from the Combined Branch of the Sirhind Canal, that departs toward the west, with the Combined Branch splitting into the northern Abohar Branch and the southern Bhatinda Branch. During the British period, the canal ran through the territory of the former boundaries of Ludhiana district and the princely state of Patiala. The branch has experienced flooding due to breaches. Pollution of the canal near Bathinda is an issue due to illegal garbage disposal and other sources of contamination.
