= Sant Isher Singh =

Sikh saint (1905–1975)

- Picture of Sant Isher Singh ji

Bhai Daya Singh Samparda
- In office 1927–1975
- Preceded by: Sant Attar Singh ji (Reru Sahib)
- Succeeded by: Sant Kishan Singh ji (Rara Sahib)
- Title: Sant

Personal life
- Born: Gulab Singh; 5 August 1905 Patiala, Punjab, British India
- Died: 25 August 1975 (aged 70) England
- Parents: Baba Ram Singh Nambardar (father); Mata Rattan Kaur (mother)
- Known for: Gurdwara Karamsar Rara Sahib; Initiating Masses into Khalsa through Amrit Sanskar; Katha and Kirtan; Rara Sahib Samparda
- Other names: Sant Isher Singh Ji; Sant Ishar Singh Ji; Karamsar Baba Ji; Rara Sahib Wale; Raja Jogi
- Occupation: Sikh Saint; Sikh Preacher; Writer; Musician; Religious Singer

Religious life
- Religion: Sikhism
- Lineage: Karamsar Samparda

Religious career
- Based in: Rara Sahib

Sant Isher Singh (Punjabi: ਸੰਤ ਈਸ਼ਰ ਸਿੰਘ; 5 August 1905 – 26 August 1975), respectfully known as Sant Maharaj Isher Singh Ji by members of the Sikh community, was believed to be a Brahmgiani Sikh saint (Sant) from Rara Sahib. He devoted his life to Kirtan and Katha, spreading the divine message and teachings of the Sikh Gurus across the world, doing so for over 50 years.

Isher Singh served as the head of the Sikh institution 'Bhai Daya Singh Samparda' (also known as the Rara Sahib Samparda), succeeding Sant Attar Singh Ji of Reru Sahib. Renowned for his unwavering devotion to Sikhi, he is claimed to not only embody the Sikh principles in his own life but also dedicated himself to spreading its teachings across India and beyond. His spiritual guidance is said to have inspired millions, leading countless individuals to embrace the Khalsa and deepening their connection to the Sikh faith.

== Early life and education ==
On August 5, 1905, Isher Singh was born as Gulab Singh in the village of Allowal, district Patiala, in Punjab, to Baba Ram Singh, a respected Nambardar, and Mata Rattan Kaur, both devout Sikhs. According to his biographies and Sikh scholars, his birth is believed to have been prophesied on two significant occasions:

1. A wandering Sadhu, seeking alms at Sant Isher Singh’s maternal home, bowed before Mata Rattan Kaur and foretold that she would give birth to a great Brahmgiani saint.
2. A saint presented a rose to Baba Ram Singh, declaring that his son would grow into a great Mahapurkh, who, like the rose, would spread the fragrance of Naam throughout the world. Inspired by this prophecy, he was named Gulab, meaning "rose".

From a young age, Sant Isher Singh is said to have displayed deep spiritual inclination; he would meditate by a well on the outskirts of his village and immerse himself in the teachings of Guru Granth Sahib Ji. His devotion extended to reading and studying religious scriptures, engaging in Seva (selfless service), meditating, and seeking the company of enlightened saints.

When Sant Isher Singh was five years old, it is said that he and his parents visited Baba Biram Das Ji, a revered saint from the Udasi Sect. During their meeting, Baba Biram Das Ji foretold that Sant Isher Singh would grow up to become a Raja Jogi and a Maryada Purushottam saint, commanding such spiritual greatness that even people of high status would bow before him.

=== Education ===
After receiving three years of education from Sada Nand Sadhu in Allowal, Sant Isher Singh went on to complete his primary education in the villages of Chulela and Manaod. From the 6th grade onward, he enrolled in Model High School, Patiala, where he did his secondary education. He was said to have a charismatic presence and graceful demeanor. Sant Isher Singh was fluent in multiple languages, including Punjabi, Urdu, Hindi, and English.

Sant Isher Singh Ji not only excelled academically, consistently achieving the highest among his peers, but also demonstrated remarkable talent in sports. A passionate athlete, he was a member of the New Hockey Sports Club and participated in various sports, such as: volleyball, cricket, and basketball. He frequently played hockey alongside soldiers from the Patiala Topkhana and had a keen interest in athletics as well.

== Religious career ==
At a young age, Sant Isher Singh came into the spiritual company of Sant Attar Singh of Reru Sahib, a renowned Sikh Saint of the early 1900s, and became his devoted student. Inspired by the saint’s spiritual wisdom and devotion, Gulab Singh embraced Amrit and was given the name 'Isher'. Under Sant Attar Singh’s guidance, he dedicated himself to Seva (selfless service) and Bhagati (spiritual devotion). Sant Kishen Singh, the lifelong companion of Sant Isher Singh, was also a devoted student of Sant Attar Singh. Like Sant Isher Singh, he is revered by as a great Brahmgiani saint in Sikh history.

=== Rara Sahib ===
After the passing of Sant Attar Singh, both Sant Isher Singh and Sant Kishan Singh departed from Gurdwara Reru Sahib and eventually settled in the forests of Rara Sahib, a sacred place once visited by the sixth Sikh Guru, Guru Hargobind Sahib Ji. Immersing themselves in Simran and Samadhi (deep meditation) for a long time, they transformed the once-remote forest into what is now known as Gurdwara Karamsar, a revered spiritual center where Sikhs gather to learn, meditate, worship, and engage in Seva (selfless service).

Gian Singh Rarewala, former chief minister of PEPSU, was a classmate and close friend of Sant Isher Singh Ji Rarewale. On his request, Sant Isher Singh Ji and his companion Sant Kishan Singh Ji settled in village Rara Sahib and made this desolate place into a spiritual haven.

=== Preaching Sikhi ===
Sant Isher Singh was widely revered among Sikhs not only for his immense Seva (selfless service) and Simran (meditative remembrance of God) but also for his dedication to preaching Sikhi, delivering Kirtan, and his literature. He gained further recognition for leading mass Amrit Sanchar ceremonies, initiating countless individuals into the Khalsa through Amrit Sanchar. Between the 1950s and 1970s, he frequently traveled to Kenya, Tanzania, Uganda, and the United Kingdom as part of his religious services, spreading the teachings of Sikhi and strengthening Sikh communities abroad.

The recordings of Sant Isher Singh’s Katha (spiritual discourses) and Kirtan (devotional hymns) continue to be widely listened to on Youtube and other platforms—not only by everyday Sikhs but also by scholars seeking to deepen their understanding of Sikhi through his teachings and writings. According to prominent Sikh personalities and Jathedaars, his life remains a guiding example for Sikhs, and even after 50+ years his passing, his spiritual wisdom continues to inspire many to walk the path of Gurmat and embrace Gursikhi.

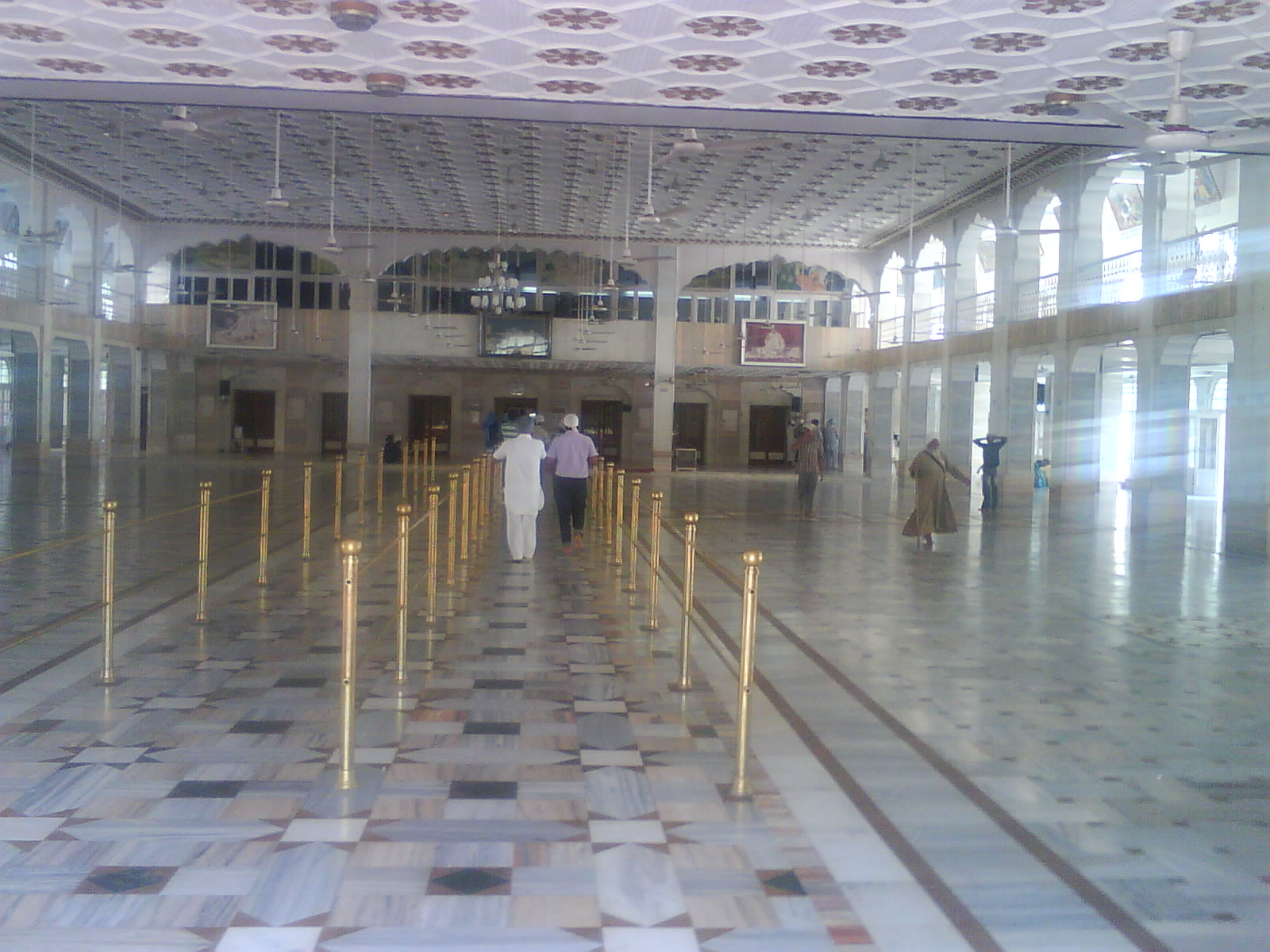
Rara Sahib Gurdwara in Ludhiana, Punjab

== Death ==
On August 26, 1975, Sant Isher Singh Ji died in Wolverhampton, England. Having practiced celibacy throughout his life, he neither married nor had children. In his final recording, he is said to have performed Kirtan of a verse that translated to, "Few are thine days, thou hast grown weary, and the body vesture has gone old." This is claimed to be one of the many subtle hints he gave, signaling his imminent departure.

=== Disciples ===
It is believed that 101 students of the saint achieved the esteemed spiritual level of Brahmgiaan. Among his many disciples and those who did ‘Sangat’ of him, some include:

- Sant Teja Singh ji (Rara Sahib, Bhora Sahib), who is known for his Seva and humility, taking care of the Bhora Sahib, and later upholding the Seva of Gurdwara Karamsar, Rara Sahib (later succeeded by Sant Baljinder Singh Ji).
- Sant Ranjit Singh ji Virakt (Fatehgarh Panjgrian), well known for his strict Bhagati and Tyaag, who was given the title of 'Virakt' (meaning 'desireless one' / 'detached one') by Sant Isher Singh ji Maharaj (later succeeded by Sant Balkar Singh Ji).
- Sant Narain Singh ji ‘Sri Maan ji’ (Fatehgarh Panjgrian), the first Sri Maan ji (Sevadar responsible for Langar) of Rara Sahib, and the first Sri Maan Ji of Sant Ashram Dhablan Sahib, who later went to Fatehgarh Panjgrian under the Hukam of Sant Isher Singh ji.
- Jathedar Sant Mahinder Singh ji (Rara Sahib Jarg), who became the Jathedar of the Rara Sahib 'Hazuri Kirtani Jatha'.
- ‘Babu ji’, who is seen with Sant Isher Singh ji in many of the earlier pictures and served as the ‘Garvaee Singh’ (close attendant).
- Sant Waryam Singh ji (Ratwara Sahib), a well renowned scholar in Sikhi, known for his literature and educational contributions.
- Sant Sukhdev Singh ji (Alohran Sahib), who did a lot of seva in Gurdwara Sant Ashram Dhablaan and established the Gurdwara in Alohran Sahib.
- Sant Karam Singh ji (Sidhsar Bhikhi, Rara Sahib)
- Bhai Amrik Singh ji (Rara Sahib), who became the Mukh Kirtani of Rara Sahib, known for his Kirtan.
- Sant Maan Singh ji (Pehowa), who did a lot of parchaar in foreign countries and known for establishing educational institutions.
- Sant Bhagwan Singh ji (Rara Sahib Begowal)
- Sant Baba Balwant Singh ji (Rara Sahib), who did a lot of seva in Gurdwara Karamsar, Rara Sahib.
- Many more...

=== Gurdwaras ===
There are two Asthaans which were established by Sant Isher Singh ji and Sant Kishen Singh ji to preach the teachings of the Sikh Gurus:

1. Gurdwara Karamsar, Rara Sahib; named after Sant Karam Singh ji of Hoti Mardan, predecessor of Sant Attar Singh of Reru Sahib.
2. Gurdwara Sant Ashram, Dhablan; established in 1954

Some of the Gurdwaras built in the legacy of Sant Isher Singh ji include:

- Gurdwara Ishersar Sahib, Allowal; This Gurdwara stands in the village where Sant Isher Singh Ji was born. Each year, on August 5, his birth anniversary is commemorated by Sikhs. The celebration of his birth anniversary was initially started by some of the disciples of Sant Isher Singh Ji, which included Sant Ranjit Singh Ji Virakt. Although it began at a much smaller scale, now it attracts thousands of Sikhs from across Punjab during the occasion. The foundation stone of this Gurdwara was personally laid by Sant Kishen Singh Ji (Rara Sahib).
- Crowther Road, Wolverhampton: The house where Sant Isher Singh Ji died is located on this road. With the presence of the Guru Granth Sahib, it serves as a Gurdwara. Many Sikhs, including prominent Sikh personalities, visit this site. Akhand Path is held every year to commemorate the Barsi of Sant Isher Singh Ji.
- Gurdwara Sant Ashram Ishersar Sahib, Fatehgarh Panjgrian: This Gurdwara is named after Sant Isher Singh Ji and was established by Sant Ranjit Singh Virakt and Sant Narain Singh Ji. Under the Hukam of Sant Isher Singh Ji himself, Sant Ranjit Singh ji Virakt came to this place to do Parchaar of Sikh teachings. It is among the earliest Gurdwaras of the Rara Sahib Samparda, established with the blessings of Sant Kishan Singh ji. Since the first Barsi (death anniversary) in 1976, Sant Kishan Singh Ji personally visited this sacred site each year to commemorate the occasion.
- Gurdwara Karamsar, Ilford; This Gurdwara was built in 1996 to commemorate the legacy of Sant Ishar Singh Ji and his successors in East London.
- Gurdwara Yaadgaar Sant Isher Singh ji, Rara Sahib Jarg. Established by Jathedar Mahinder Singh Ji (Rara Sahib Jarg), and now the Seva is looked after Sant Bhupinder Singh Ji.
- Gurdwara Isherpur, Alohran Sahib. This place was established by Sant Sukhdev Singh Ji (Alhoran Sahib Wale), and now the Seva is overseen by Sant Kashmira Singh Ji.
- Gurdwara Sachkhand Isher Darbar. This place was established by Sant Mann Singh Ji (Pehowa Wale).
- Gurdwara Isher Parkash, Ratwara Sahib. Established by Sant Waryam Singh Ji (Ratwara Sahib).

There are hundreds of Gurdwaras around the world are connected to the Rara Sahib Samparda, spanning Punjab, India, the UK, Europe, Africa, Oceania and North America.

=== Charitable and Educational Organisations ===
Sant Isher Singh Ji and his followers established several charitable organisations, including the Sant Isher Singh Charitable Trust and the Sant Isher Singh Ji Memorial Public Trust. These organizations are dedicated to providing education, healthcare, and other essential services across India. Many educational institutions and medical institutions are established in his memory by his followers.

== See also ==
- Gurdwara Karamsar Rara Sahib
- Rara Sahib
- Sant (religion)
- Bhai Daya Singh
- Baba Sahib Singh Bedi
- Bhai Maharaj Singh
