= Ramgarh Sardaran =

Ramgarh Sardaran is a village in Payal tehsil, Ludhiana district, Punjab state of India. It is situated 18 km from its tehsil (sub-district headquarter) Payal and approx. 40 km from its district ludhiana. As per 2011 stats, Ramgarh Sardaran village is also a gram panchayat which has 813 families.

== Geography ==
The village is located near to Malaudh and just 2 km from patiala-ludhiana highway. The total geographical area of village is approx. 851 hectares.

== Climate ==
Ramgarh Sardaran experiences three main seasons. They are:

- Hot season (mid-April to the end of June)
- Rainy season (early July to the end of September)
- Cold season (early December to the end of February).

Apart from these three, this village experiences transitional seasons like:

- Pre-summer season (March to mid-April): This is the period of transition between winter and summer.
- Post-monsoon season (September to end of November): This is the period of transition between monsoon and winter seasons.

=== Summer ===
It starts experiencing mildly hot temperatures in February. However, the actual summer season commences in mid-April. The area experiences pressure variations during the summer months. The atmospheric pressure of the region remains around 987 millibar during February and it reaches 970 millibar in June.

=== Rainy season ===
The monsoon brings joy to the agricultural sector as farmers become very busy. The rainy season begins in first week of July as monsoon currents generated in the Bay of Bengal bring rain to the region.

=== Winter ===
Temperature variation is minimal in January. The mean night and day temperatures fall to 5 °C (41 °F) and 12 °C (54 °F), respectively.

=== Post-Monsoon transitional season ===
The monsoon begins to reduce by the second week of September. This brings a gradual change in climate and temperature. The time between October and November is the transitional period between monsoon and winter seasons. Weather during this period is generally fair and dry.

=== Post-Winter transitional season ===
The effects of winter diminish by the first week of March. The hot summer season commences in mid-April. This period is marked by occasional showers with hail storms and squalls which cause extensive damage to crops. The winds remain dry and warm during the last week of March, commencing the harvest period.

== Rainfall ==
- Monsoon Rainfall

Monsoon season provides most of the rainfall for the region. Ramgarh Sardaran receives rainfall from the monsoon current of the Bay of Bengal. This monsoon current enters the state from the southeast in the first week of July.

- Winter Rainfall

The winter season remains very cool with temperatures falling below freezing at some places. Winter also brings in some western disturbances. Rainfall in the winter provides relief to the farmers.

== Connectivity of Ramgarh Sardaran ==
Public Bus service - Direct private buses from malerkotla, Rara Sahib, Ahmedgarh Mandi, Payal.

== Demographics ==
The population is approximately 4426 people living in 813 households.

Ramgarh	Sardaran
Area (total)	851 hectares
Area (village)	108 hectares
Area (agricultural)	743 hectares
Population (as per 2011 census)	4426
Male's (as per 2011 census)	2284
Female's (as per 2011 census)	2142
Literates (as per 2011 census)	3152
Language	Punjabi
Religion's	Sikh, Hindu, Muslim
Voters total (list as for 2012 assembly elections)	2851
Pin Code	141119
Coordinates	30°38'25"N 75°54'12"E

== Religious sites ==
- Guruduwara Baba Sidhsar Sahib
- Guruduwara Guru Ravidass Ji
- Guruduwara Sahib in main bazaar
- Mandir Baba Tota Puri Ji
- Mandir Ram Leela
- The Mosque
- Shiv Duwala
- Dargah Peer Lutaf Shah Ji
- Dargah Peer Baba Lalan Wala ji
- Baba Gugga Marri
- Mandir Hanumaan Ji
- Mandir Maata Rani Ji

== Education ==
- Govt. Elementary School Ramgarh Sardaran
- Govt. High School Ramgarh Sardaran
- Baba Deep singh girls college.
