= Andlu =

- Village
- Interactive map of Andlu
- Coordinates: 30°40′20″N 75°41′07″E
- Country: India
- State: Punjab
- District: Ludhiana

Languages
  - Official: Punjabi
- Time zone: UTC+5:30 (IST)
- Nearest city: Raikot

Andlu, also written as Aandlu, Andloo or Anduloo, is a small to medium-sized village in the Punjab state of India. It has a population of approximately 2500 and is located in the Raikot tehsil of district Ludhiana. The nearest major city is Ludhiana which is at approximately 38 kilometers from Andlu. Andlu is well connected to Raikot, Ludhiana and Ahmedgarh by well laid network of roads. It has two schools; the primary school for children up to fifth grade and a Higher Secondary School for students up to Grade twelfth. It also has a health dispensary run by the Department of Health of Punjab, and has a MBBS doctor appointed to the dispensary. People of Andlu actively participate in sports, facilities for which are available in the large ground in the premises of the Higher secondary school. Popular games are football, cricket, Rope pulling, volleyball and cart racing.

== Economy ==
The primary occupation of the people of Andlu, like majority of villages of Punjab, is agriculture. A significant population of Andlu consists of people of scheduled caste and backward class (OBC). As the economy grows, Andlu continues to grow and recently many new shops and eating joints, called Dhabhas, have sprung in the periphery of village. Also a gas station has opened in the village which is unusual for a small village like Andlu. The most common religion of people of Andlu is Sikh, followed by Hindus. In the past few decades, large number of families from this village have migrated to the western countries, mainly Canada, Australia, U.S.A. and U.K. And this trend continues to the present day as well as more and more youngsters choose to settle in western countries rather than continuing with the family occupation in the village. Most marriages currently solemnized in Andlu have at least one partner as foreign resident, and after marriage, the couple almost always choose to reside in the foreign country.

== History ==
Andlu is mainly a village of migrants from Pakistan who came here at the time of independence and partition of India in year 1947. Majority of the population today is of Grewal jatts. Before independence the majority of the people living here were Muslims, but later some migrated to Pakistan (now living in sidhu pura, faisalabad city, Demon Wala Kalan, Nankana Sahib city) and the majority were killed. Even today, some old abandoned Mosques, which were earlier the place of worship for Muslims, can be found in the village. Many decades ago, Andlu incorporated the neighboring village of Shahidgarh whose population was said to be totally wiped out by the Muslims hence the name of Shaheedgarh.
