= Sandaur =

- Location in Punjab, India Sandaur (India)
- Coordinates: 30.5716°N 75.7401°E
- Country: India
- State: Punjab
- District: Malerkotla

Government
  - Type: Municipal Corporation
  - Body: Municipal Corporation Malerkotla
- Time zone: UTC+5:30 (IST)
- PIN: 148023
- Vehicle registration: PB-28
- Website: www.malerkotla.co.in

Sandaur is a village in the Malerkotla district of Punjab, India. Formerly a part of the Sangrur district, it is located in the Malerkotla tehsil.

According to Census 2011 information the location code or village code of Sandaur village is 039427. It is situated 14 kilometres (8.7 mi) away from sub-district headquarter Malerkotla .Illiteracy ratio is 31%. Here 1104 out of total 3532 people are illiterate. Male illiteracy rate here is 26% as 497 males out of total 1864 are uneducated. In females the illiteracy rate is 36% and 607 out of total 1668 females are illiterate in this village. The number of employed persons is 1168 still 2364 are non-working. Out of 1168 working person 403 individuals are fully dependent on agriculture. The total area of village is 607 hectares. 1864 are males whereas the females count 1668 here. The village had 343 children in the age group of 0–6 years. Out of this 179 are boys and 164 are girls. Literacy rate in Sandaur village is 68%. 2428 out of total 3532 population is educated here. Among males the literacy ratio is 73% as 1367 males out of total 1864 are literate while female literacy ratio is 63% as 1061 out of total 1668 females are educated in this Village.
