= Amargarh, Punjab =

Amargarh
- City
- Map showing Amargarh in Punjab Amargarh (India)
- Coordinates: 30.46071°N 76.0130784°E
- Country: India
- State: Punjab
- District: Malerkotla

Government
  - Type: Legislative Assembly
  - Body: Municipal Corporation (India)
  - MLA: Jaswant Singh Gajjanmajra (Aam Aadmi Party)
  - MC: Jaspal Kaur
- Elevation: 2,546 m (8,353 ft)

Population (2011)
  - Total: 7,339
- Sex ratio 2560/2540 ♂/♀

Languages
  - Official: Punjabi
- Time zone: UTC+5:30 (IST)
- PIN: 148022
- Telephone code: 01675
- ISO 3166 code: IN-PB-92
- Post office: Amargarh
- Website: http://lgpunjab.gov.in/eSewa/amargarh/

Amargarh is a city in the Malerkotla district of Punjab state in India. It is located at main road (Malerkotla - Patiala) which is nearly 45 kilometers far from Patiala. The city is administrated by Municipal Council. Presently, Smt. Jaspal Kaur is the President of Nagar Panchayat Amargarh of the city.

== Demography ==
As of 2011, Amargarh has a total of 293 houses and population of 1451 of which 740 are males while 711 are females, according to the Census India in 2011. The literacy rate of Amargarh is 78.36%, higher than the state average of 75.84%. The population of children under the age of 6 years is 134 which is 9.24% of total population of Amargarh, and child sex ratio is approximately 861 as compared to Punjab state average of 846.

Most of the people are from Schedule Caste which constitutes 46.86% of total population in Amargarh. The town does not have any Schedule Tribe population so far.

As per the report published by Census India in 2011, 432 people were engaged in work activities out of the total population of Amargarh which includes 408 males and 24 females. According to census survey report 2011, 98.15% workers describe their work as main work and 1.85% workers are involved in Marginal activity providing livelihood for less than 6 months.

The table below shows the population of different religious groups in Amargarh city, as of 2011 census.

Population by religious groups in Amargarh city, 2011 census
Religion	Total	Female	Male
Sikh	3,923	1,882	2,041
Hindu	2,888	1,339	1,549
Muslim	503	243	260
Christian	13	6	7
Jain	10	4	6
Buddhist	1	0	1
Not stated	1	1	0
Total	7,339	3,475	3,864

== Education ==
The City has a Punjabi medium, co-ed upper primary school founded in 1977. The schools provide mid-day meal which prepared in School premises as per Indian Midday Meal Scheme. The school provide free education to children between the ages of 6 and 14 as per Right of Children to Free and Compulsory Education Act.

== Transport ==
Kariha and Nawanshahr railway station are the nearest train station however, Garhshankar Junction railway station is 17 kilometres (11 mi) away from the village. Sahnewal Airport is the nearest domestic airport which located 58 kilometres (36 mi) away in Ludhiana and the nearest international airport is located in Chandigarh also Sri Guru Ram Dass Jee International Airport is the second nearest airport which is 151 kilometres (94 mi) away in Amritsar.

== See also ==
- List of villages in India
