= Payal, India =

Payal
- city
- Location in Punjab, India Payal (India)
- Coordinates: 30.7363°N 76.0665°E
- Country: India
- State: Punjab
- District: Ludhiana

Government
  - Type: Municipal corporation

Population (2011)
  - Total: 8,150

Languages
  - Official: Punjabi
  - Regional: Puadhi
- Time zone: UTC+5:30 (IST)
- PIN: 141416
- Telephone code: 01628
- Vehicle registration: PB-55

Payal (ਪਾਯਲ) is a city in Ludhiana district in Punjab, India. It was earlier known as Sahibgarh, named after Rani Sahib Kaur of Patiala State.

== History ==
It was earlier known as Sahibgarh, named after Rani Sahib Kaur of Patiala State. Before and during the British era, the town was part of Patiala State.

After the end of British rule, in 1948, Payal became part of Fatehgarh Sahib district in the PEPSU State. In 1953, when Fatehgarh Sahib district was merged with Patiala district, the town became part of Patiala. In 1956, PEPSU was merged with Punjab. Later, in Nov. 1963, Payal was transferred to Ludhiana district along with Doraha and 72 villages.

== Demographics ==
As of 2011 India census, Payal had a population of 8150. Males constitute 53% of the population and females 47%. Payal has an average literacy rate of 65%, higher than the national average of 59.5%: male literacy is 68%, and female literacy is 63%. In Payal, 13% of the population is under 6 years of age.

Payal is pronounced (pie 'al) and is a popular Indian name that means anklets in Hindi. It is an ancient city, with more than 64 old temples built in the Mugal times. There are also ancient art pictures in the temples (Mahadev Mandir, Ganga Sagar, Nainda Devi, Ram Mandir and others). The city also has about six Gurudwaras (the main one was built on Old Mosques after the Partition of India) and a few mosques. There is also an old fort which has a girls school inside. Its original images and shapes have been destroyed and a few people have made shops under it.

== Gallery ==
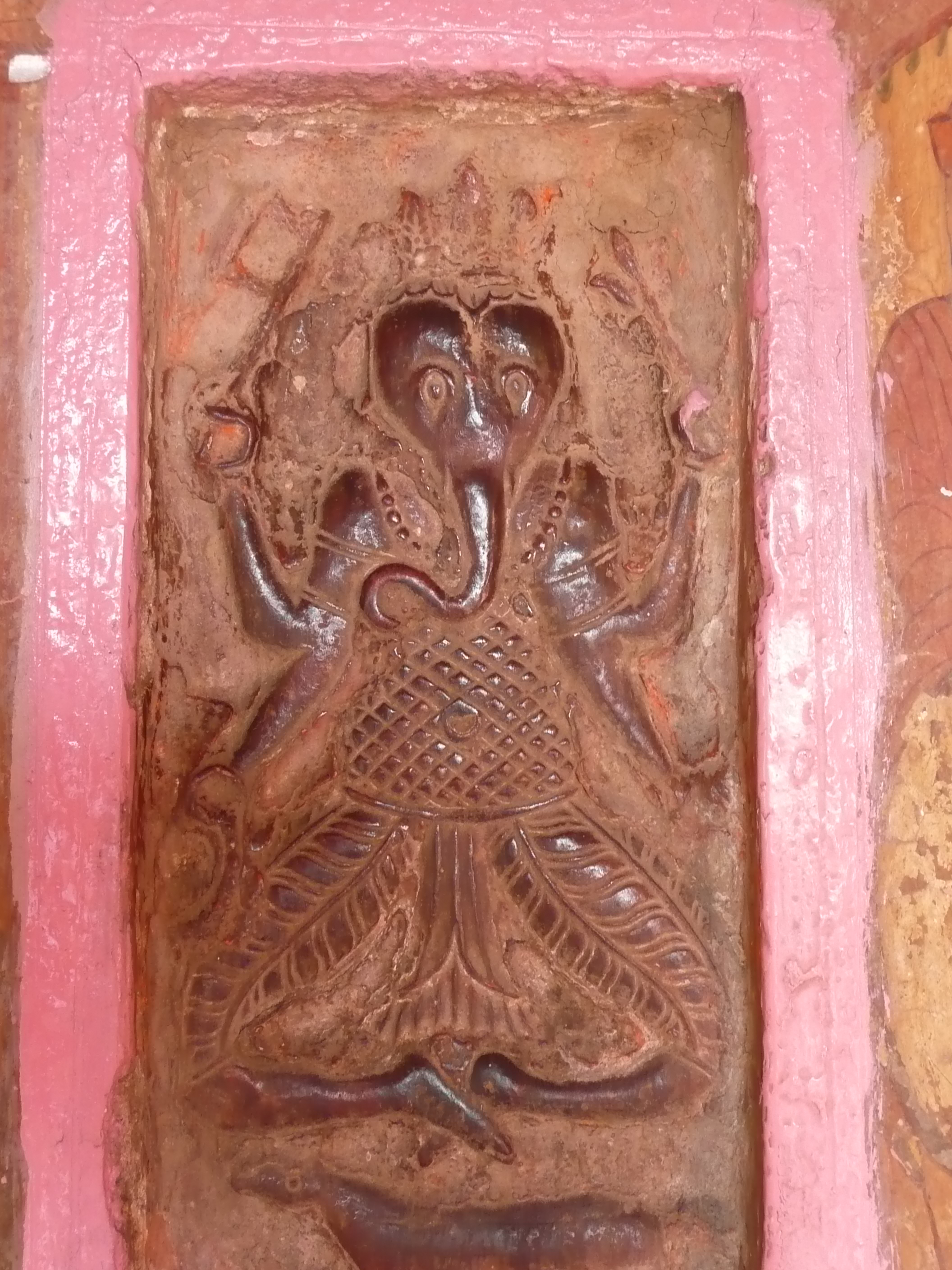
GOD GANESH

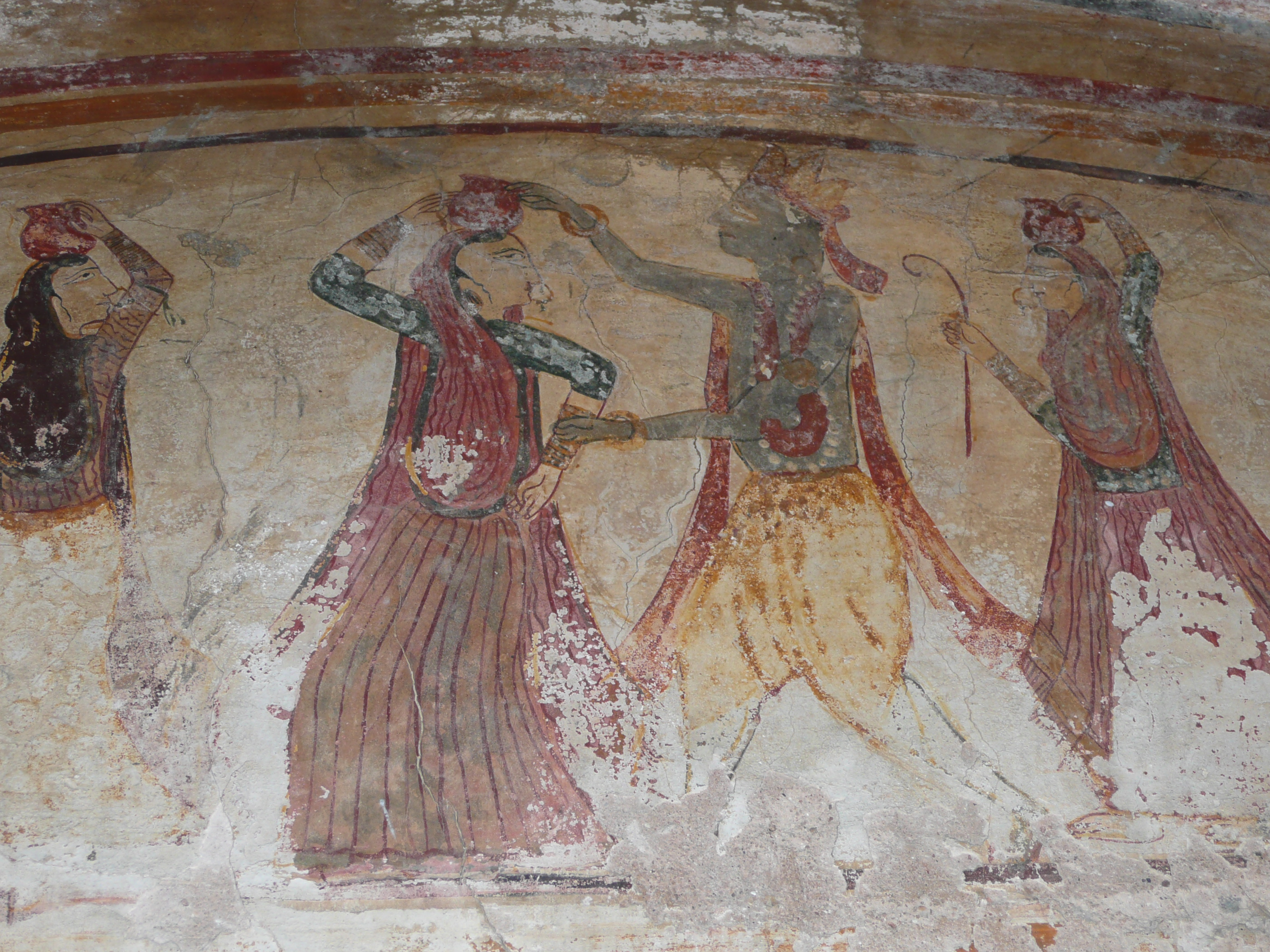
Lord Krishna with Gopi's

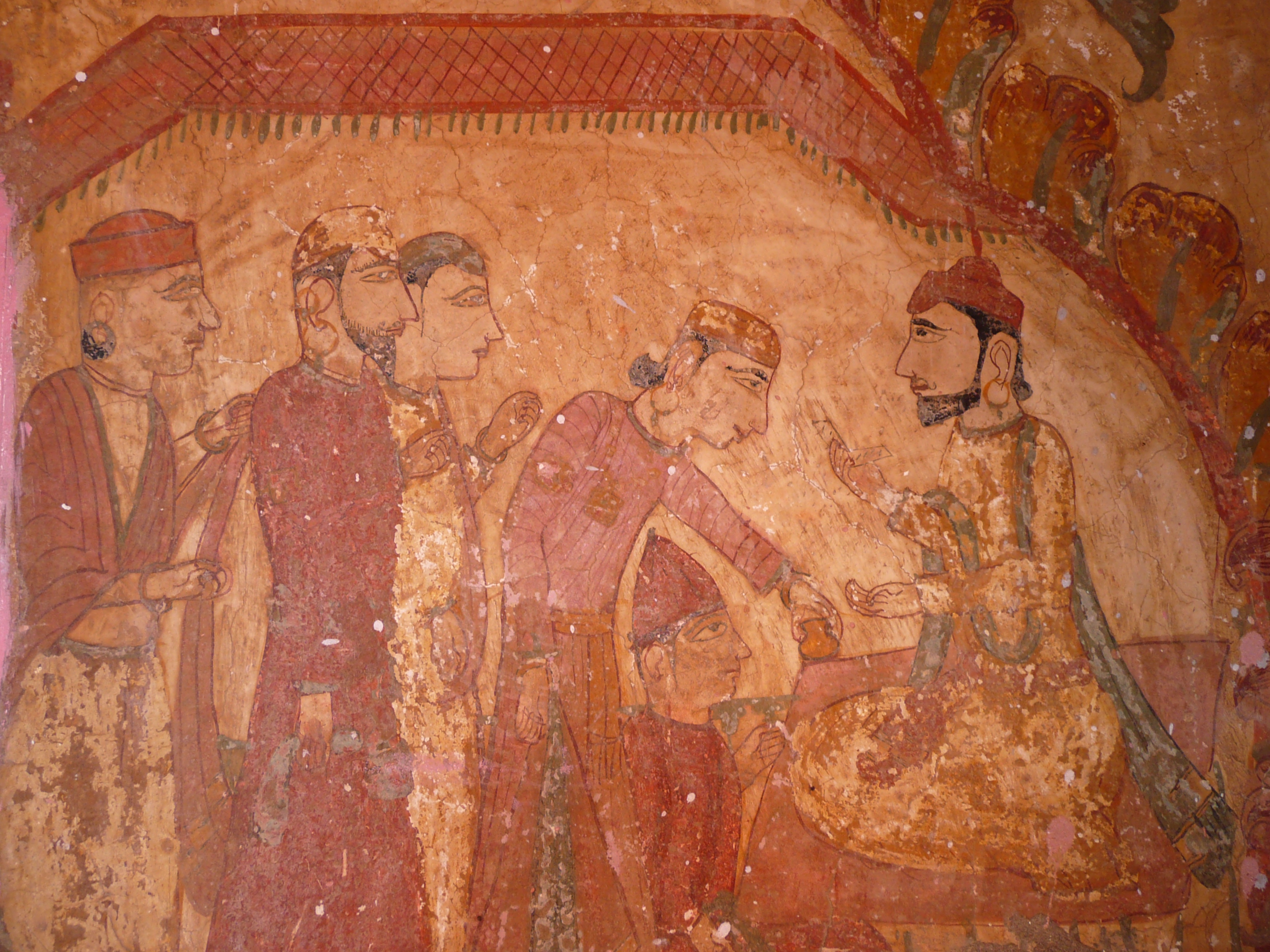
Ancient Wall Painting on Shiva Temple

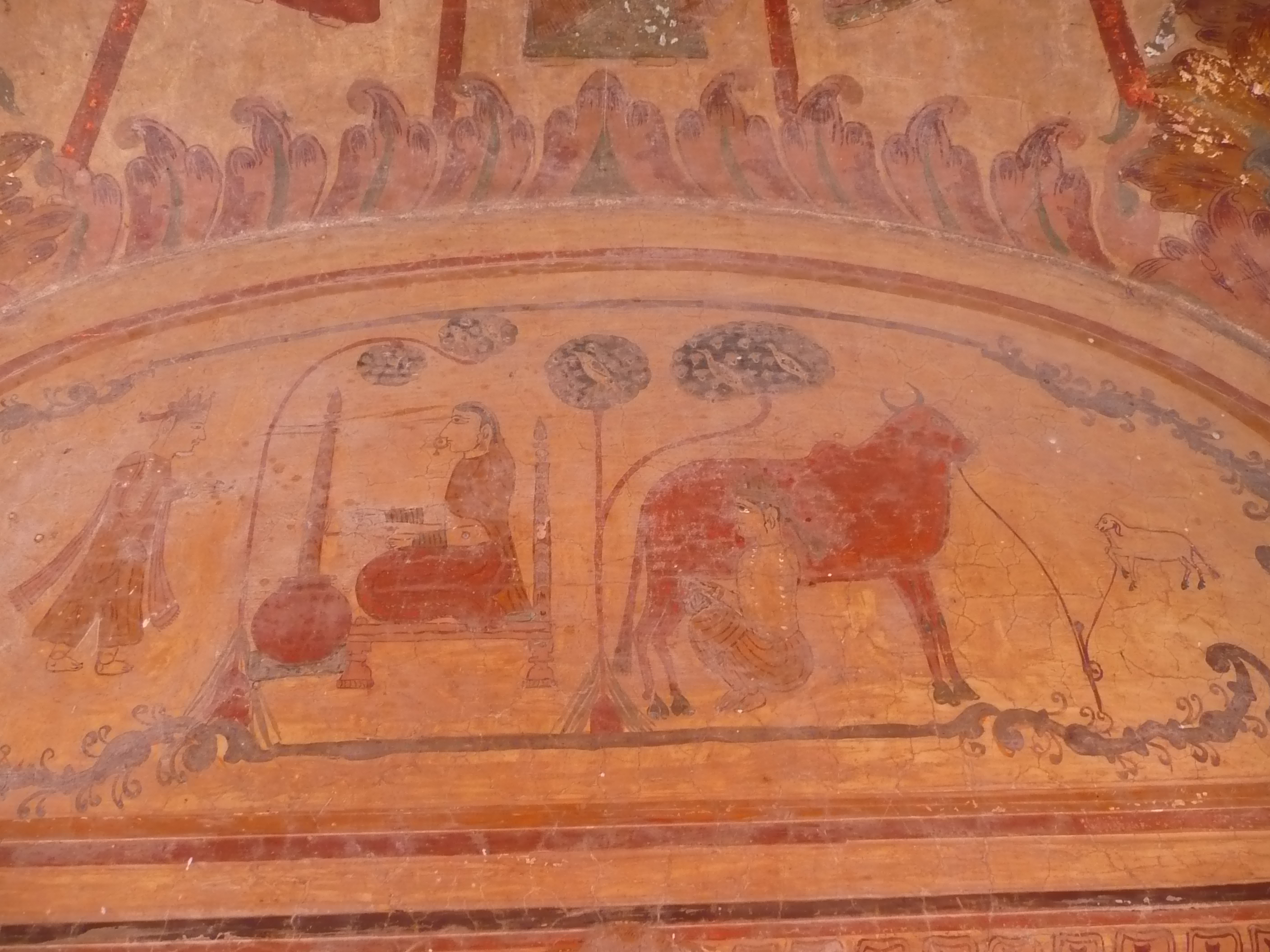
Ancient Wall Painting

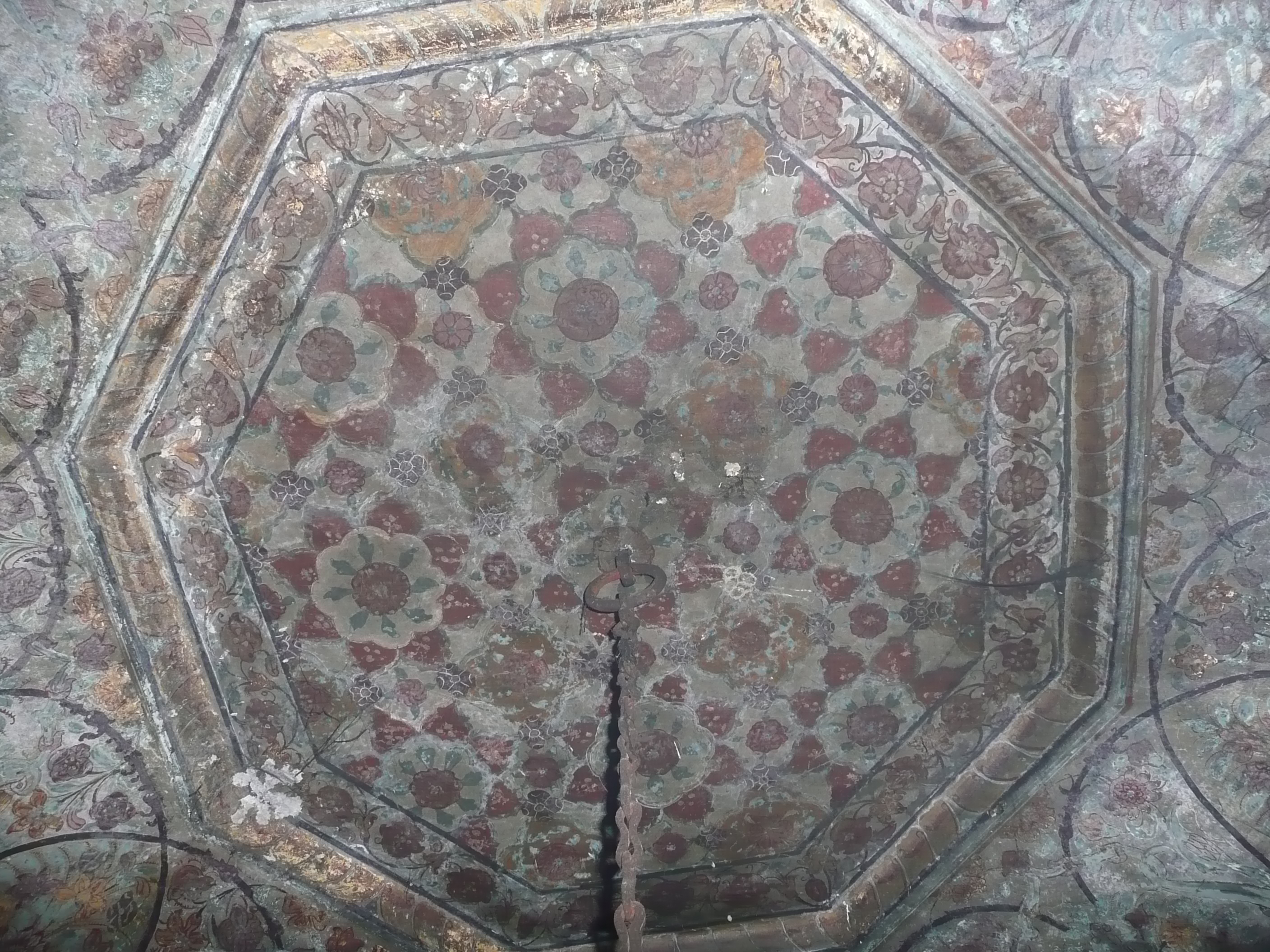
Central roof painting

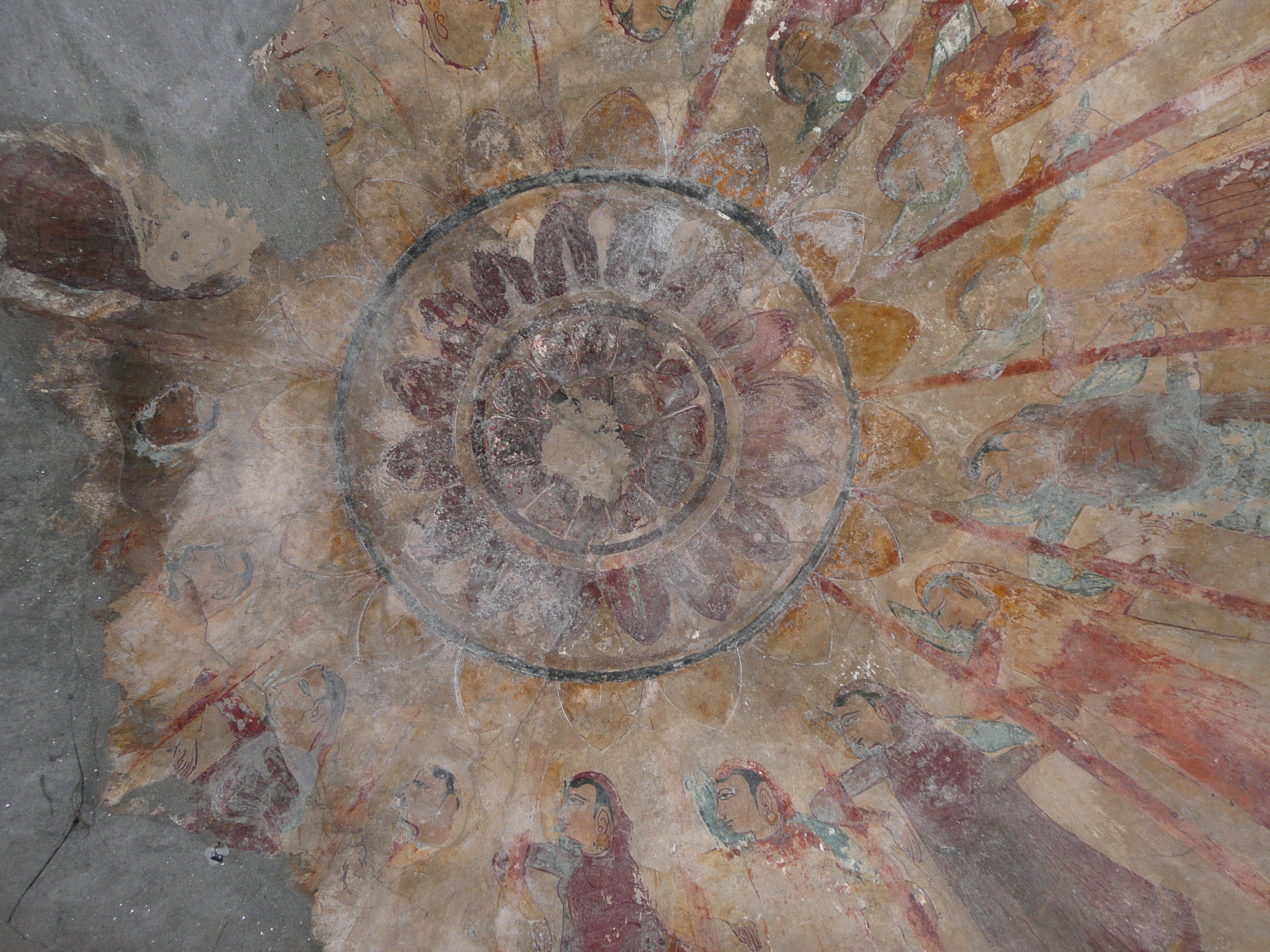
Ancient roof painting

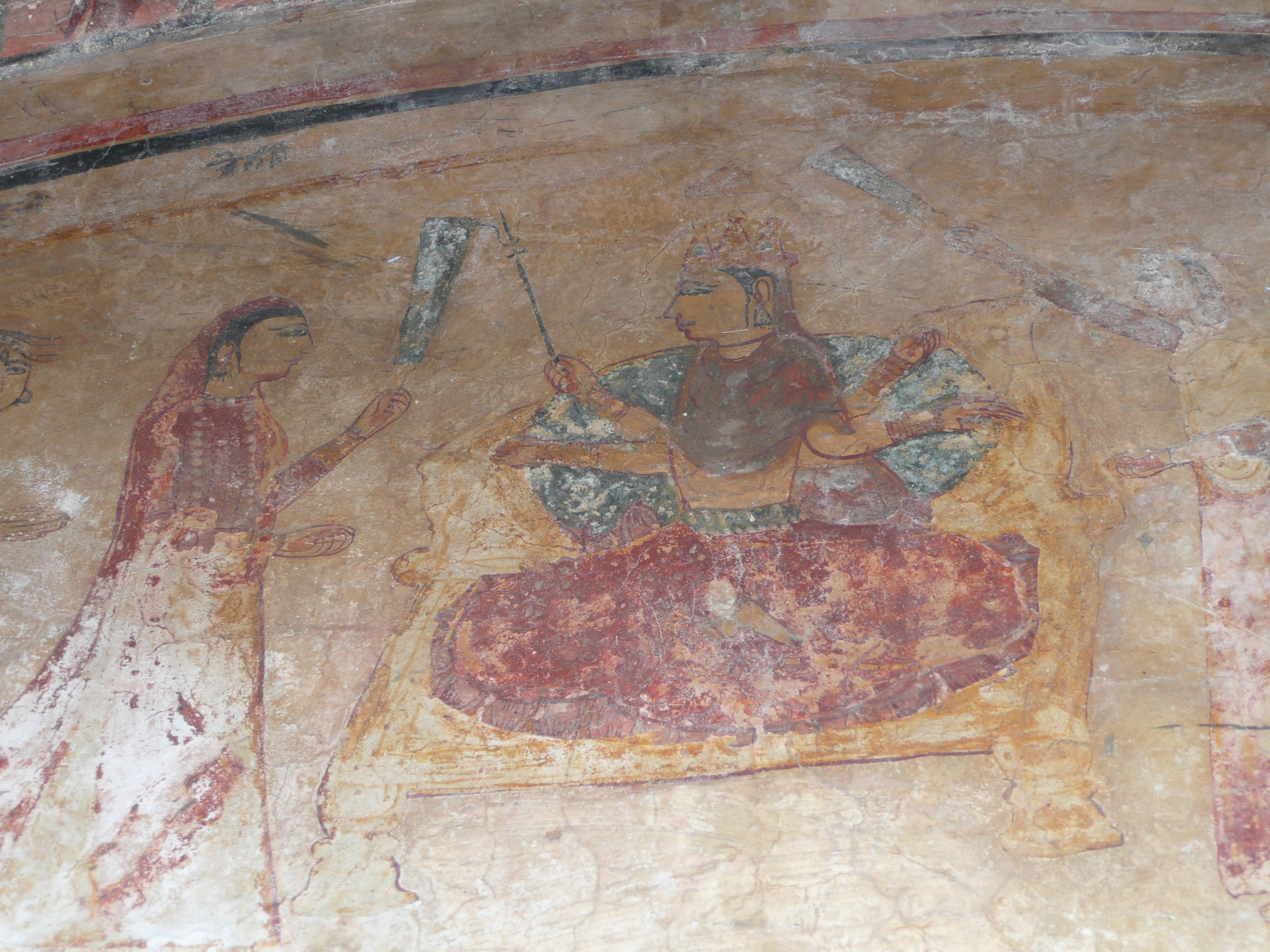
Ancient wall painting

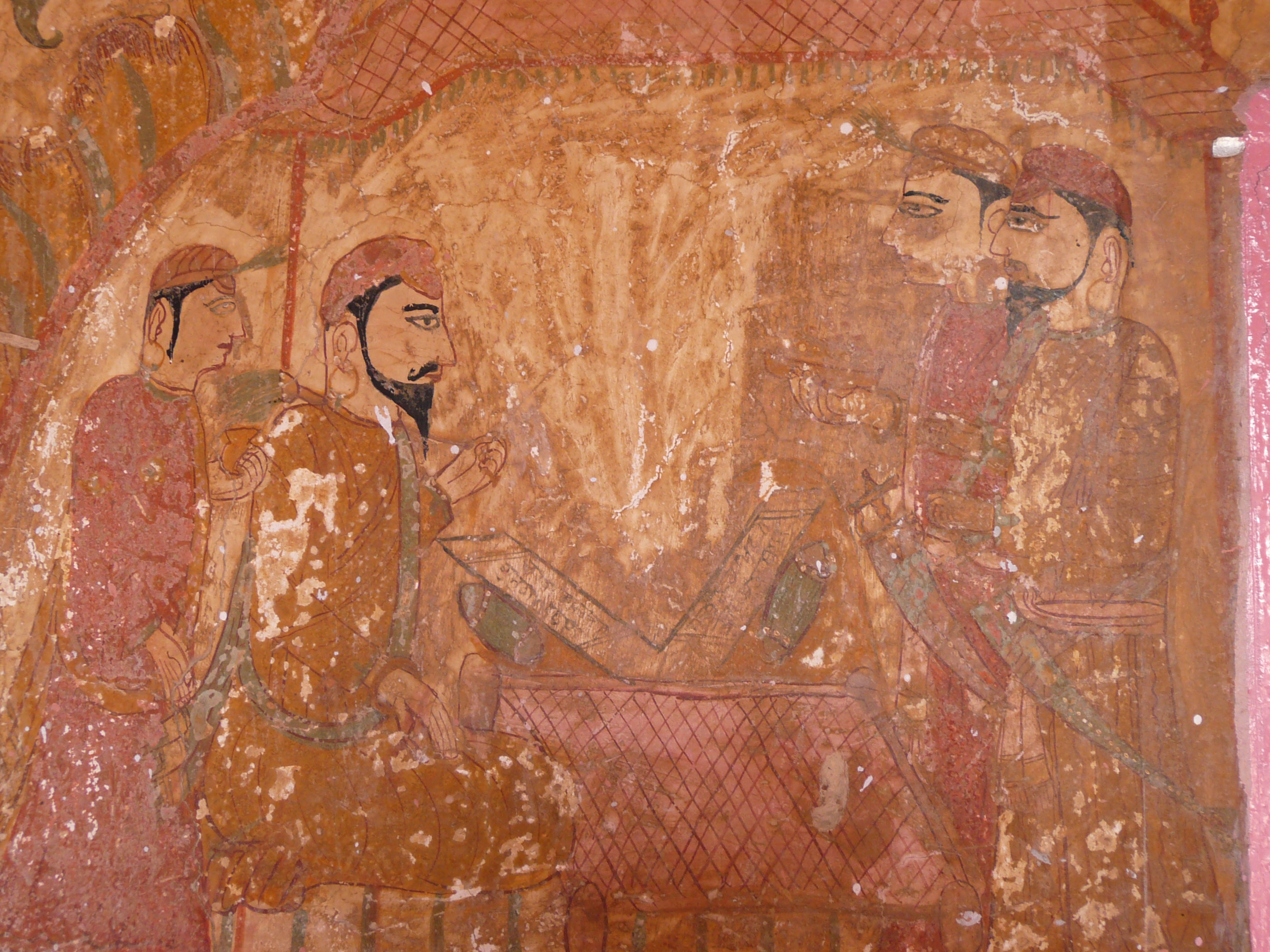
Ancient Shiva Temple painting
