= Sirhind Canal =

Canal in Punjab, India

Coordinates: 30°59′17″N 76°31′3″E

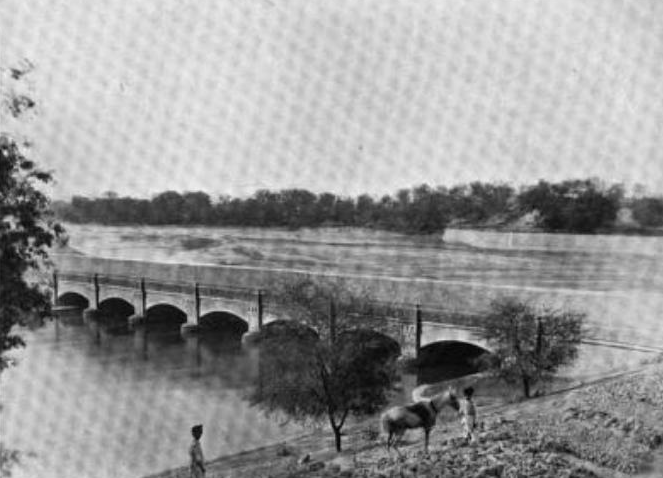
Photograph of the Budki superpassage over the Sirhind Canal in Punjab, 1905

The Sirhind Canal is a large irrigation canal that carries water from the Sutlej River in Punjab state, India. It is one of the oldest and biggest irrigation works in the Indus River system, and was inaugurated in 1882 CE. The canal begins at Ropar headworks near Ropar city in Rupnagar district of Punjab.

== Geography of the canal ==
The Sirhind Canal begins at Ropar and heads southwest to Doraha in Ludhiana district. At Doraha, the canal splits into three: the Abohar branch, the Bathinda branch and the Patiala branch. Each of these further subdivides extensively to irrigate a large swathe of the Malwa region of Punjab. Once a partially arid zone, this area is now extremely fertile due to the water distributed by the canal network.

== History ==
In 1885, the British created a branch of the canal that irrigated Faridkot State.

== Gallery ==
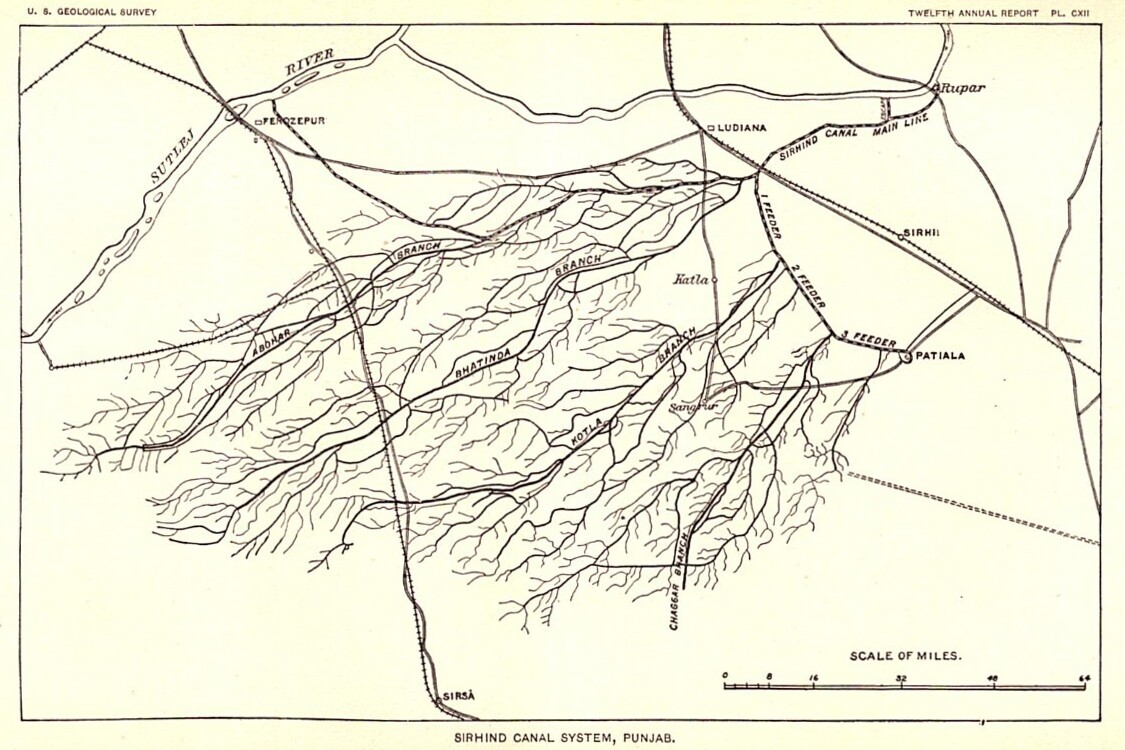
Map of the Sirhind Canal System of Punjab Province, British India, 1891

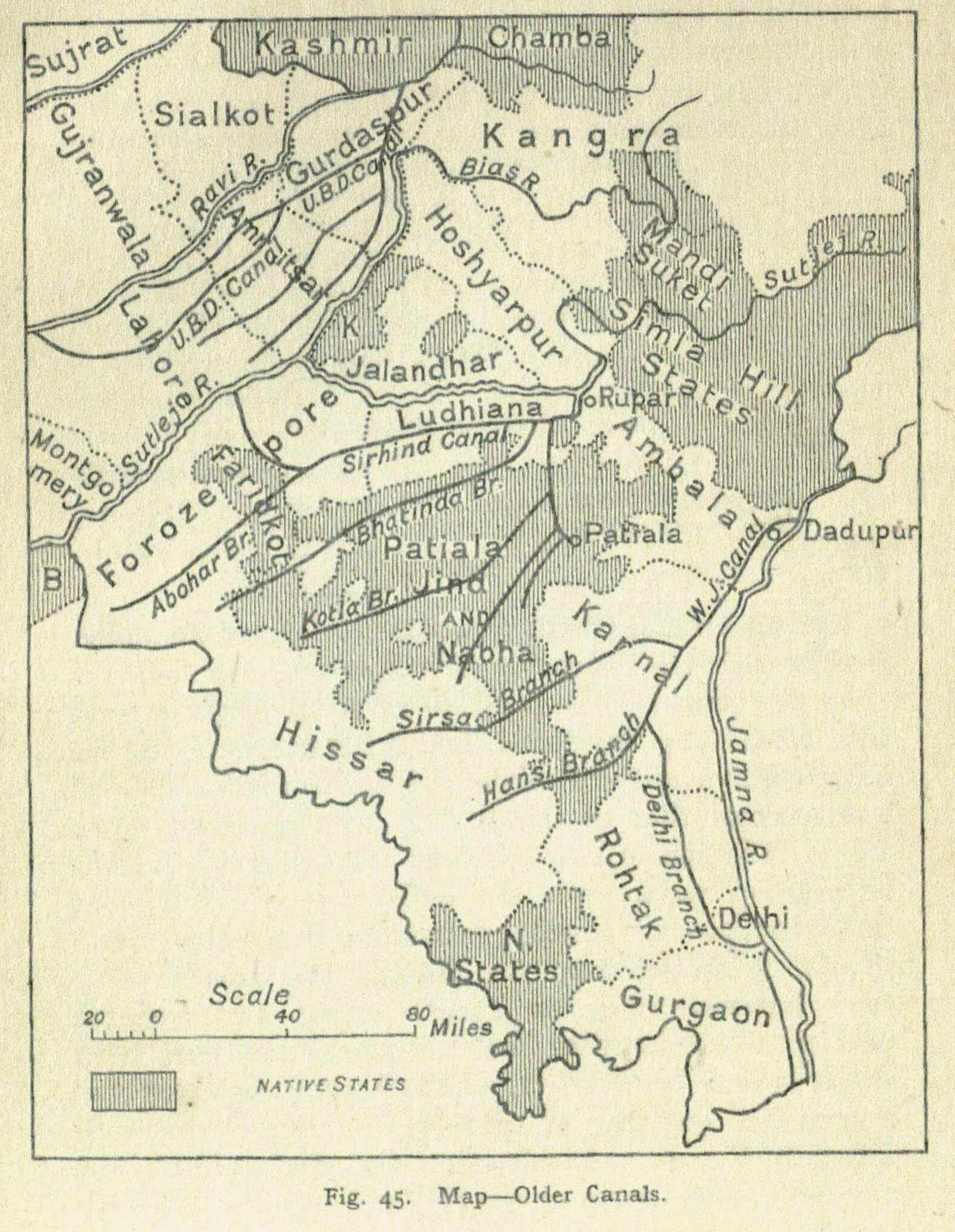
Map of canals, including the Sirhind Canal, of Punjab Province, British India, published in 'The Panjab, North-West Frontier Province and Kashmir' (1916)

== See also ==
- Sutlej River
- Sirhind
