= Malerkotla district =

District in Punjab, India

- District of Punjab, India
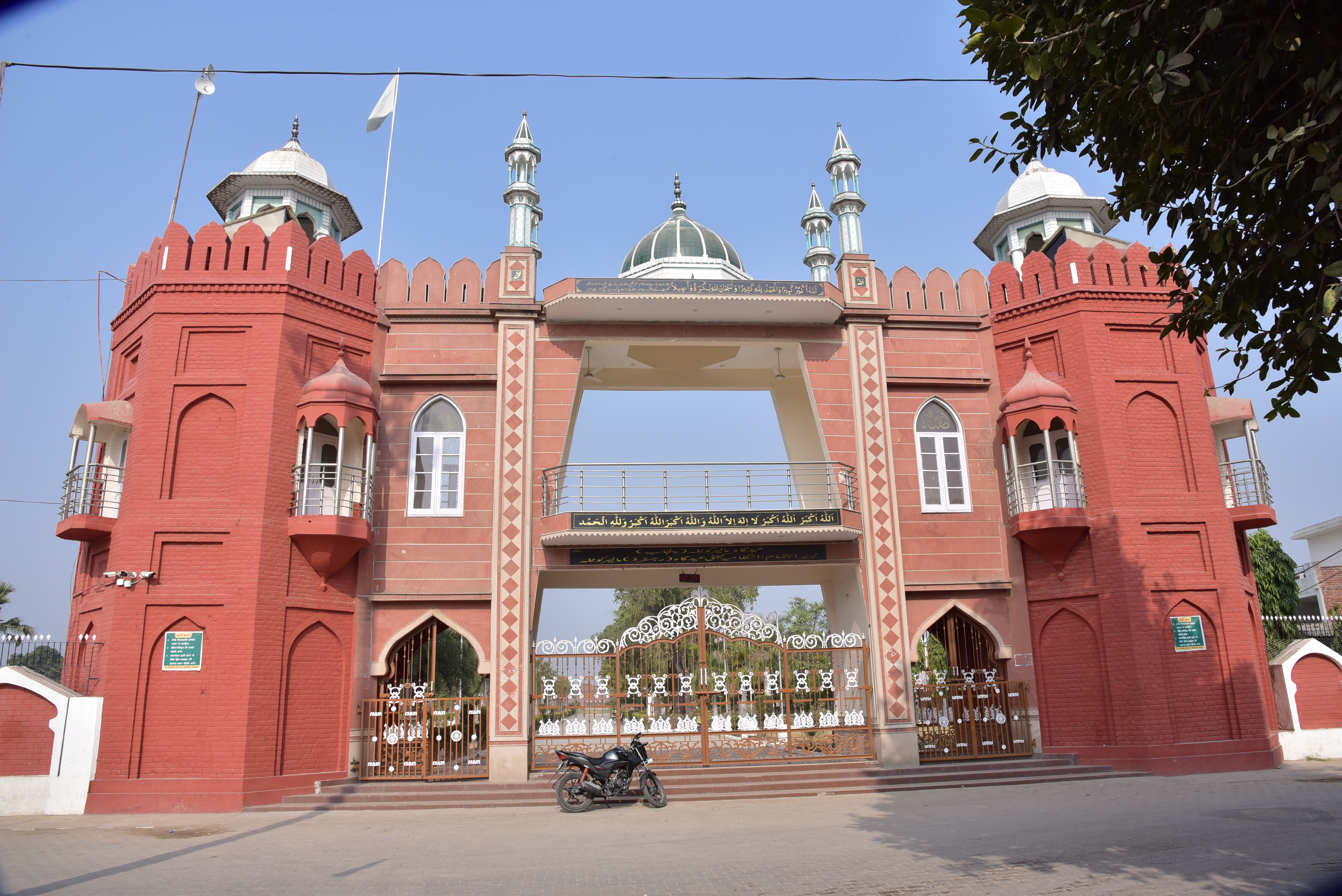
- Eidgah in Malerkotla

- Location in Punjab
- Coordinates: 30.53°N 75.88°E
- Country: India
- State: Punjab
- Division: Patiala
- Established: 02 June 2021
- Headquarters: Malerkotla

Government
  - Deputy Commissioner: Sh.Sanyam Agarwal, IAS
  - Senior Superintendent of Police: Smt. Alka Meena IPS

Area
  - Total: 684 km^{2} (264 sq mi)

Population (2011)
  - Total: 429,754
  - Rank: 23rd
  - Density: 629/km^{2} (1,630/sq mi)

Languages
  - Official: Punjabi
- Time zone: UTC+5:30 (IST)
- PIN: 148XXX
- Vehicle registration: PB-28(for Malerkotla); PB-82(for Ahmedgarh); PB-92(for Amargarh)
- Headquarters: Malerkotla
- Sex ratio: 896 ♂/♀
- Literacy: 76.28%
- Lok Sabha constituency: Sangrur; Fatehgarh Sahib
- Punjab Legislative Assembly constituency: 2 •Malerkotla •Amargarh
- Precipitation: 450 millimetres (18 in)
- Avg. summer temperature: 48 °C (118 °F)
- Avg. winter temperature: 7 °C (45 °F)
- Website: malerkotla.nic.in

Malerkotla district is a district in Punjab state of India. It was formed after the bifurcation of Sangrur district and became the 23rd district of Punjab on 2 June 2021, on the occasion of Eid. District Malerkotla is divided into three Tahsils: Malerkotla, Amargarh and Ahmedgarh. The district is part of the Patiala division.

== History ==
Malerkotla was a princely state from 1454 until 20 August 1948, when it become a part of Patiala and East Punjab States Union (PEPSU). Within PEPSU, it was incorporated into Sangrur district. Amargarh region, on the other hand, had been part of Patiala State before 1948 and was also merged into Sangrur district under PEPSU. In 1956, PEPSU was dissolved and merged into the state of Punjab. In 2021, Malerkotla district was formed out of Sangrur district. Despite its formation, adequate infrastructure befitting of a district is yet to be provided fully to Malerkotla district.

== Administration ==
Malerkotla is the 23rd district in the state of Punjab in northern India.

On 2 June 2021, Malerkotla was carved out of Sangrur to become the 23rd district of Punjab. The new district comprises three subdivisions: Malerkotla, Amargarh, and Ahmedgarh.

=== Subdistricts of Malerkotla district ===
According to the Indian government's integrated online directory, Malerkotla district is divided into the following subdistricts (tehsils/subdivisions) and blocks:

- Subdistricts
  1. Ahmedgarh
  2. Amargarh
  3. Malerkotla
- Blocks:
  1. Ahmedgarh
  2. Amargarh
  3. Malerkotla (Head Quarter)

== Demographics ==
=== Population ===
Malerkotla district has a population of 429,754 according to the 2011 census. It has an area of 684 Sq Km. It has 3 revenue divisions, municipalities & CD Blocks. There are 175 Gram Panchayats & 192 villages. 40.50% of the population lives in urban areas. Scheduled Castes make up 93,047 (21.65%) of the population.

=== Religion ===
Sikhism is the majority religion, and is mainly rural. Unlike the rest of erstwhile Punjab, the Muslims of Malerkotla did not move to Pakistan during Partition and Malerkotla still has a sizeable minority of Muslims. Hindus are the third-largest community in urban areas.

Religion in Malerkotla district (2011)
Religion	Percent
Sikhism	50.89%
Islam	33.26%
Hinduism	15.19%
Other or not stated	0.66%

Religious groups in Malerkotla State (British Punjab province era)
Religious group	1881		1891		1901		1911		1921		1931		1941	
Religious group	Pop.	%	Pop.	%	Pop.	%	Pop.	%	Pop.	%	Pop.	%	Pop.	%
Sikhism	28,931	40.72%	7,625	10.07%	10,495	13.54%	21,018	29.54%	21,828	27.18%	28,982	34.89%	30,320	34.41%
Islam	24,616	34.65%	26,866	35.46%	27,229	35.13%	25,942	36.46%	28,413	35.37%	31,417	37.82%	33,881	38.45%
Hinduism (Note: 1931-1941: Including Ad-Dharmis)	16,178	22.77%	39,973	52.77%	38,409	49.56%	22,902	32.19%	29,459	36.68%	21,252	25.58%	23,482	26.65%
Jainism	1,323	1.86%	1,276	1.68%	1,361	1.76%	1,268	1.78%	585	0.73%	1,286	1.55%	310	0.35%
Christianity	3	0%	15	0.02%	12	0.02%	14	0.02%	37	0.05%	135	0.16%	116	0.13%
Zoroastrianism	0	0%	0	0%	0	0%	0	0%	0	0%	0	0%	0	0%
Buddhism	0	0%	0	0%	0	0%	0	0%	0	0%	0	0%	0	0%
Judaism	—N/a	—N/a	0	0%	0	0%	0	0%	0	0%	0	0%	0	0%
Others	0	0%	0	0%	0	0%	0	0%	0	0%	0	0%	0	0%
Total population	71,051	100%	75,755	100%	77,506	100%	71,144	100%	80,322	100%	83,072	100%	88,109	100%
Note1: British Punjab province era district borders are not an exact match in the present-day due to various bifurcations to district borders — which since created new districts — throughout the historic Punjab Province region during the post-independence era that have taken into account population increases. Note2: British Punjab province era figures are for Malerkotla State.

=== Language ===
Languages of Malerkotla district (2011)
1. Punjabi (94.7%)
2. Urdu (4.21%)
3. Others (1.10%)

At the time of the 2011 census, 94.69% of the population spoke Punjabi and 4.21% Urdu as their first language.

== Politics ==
Malerkotla district is part of the Malerkotla Assembly constituency. Mohammad Jamil Ur Rehman (AAP) is the MLA since 2022.

The district is part of the Sangrur Lok Sabha constituency. A by-election to the Sangrur Lok Sabha constituency was held on 23 June 2022 and Simranjit Singh Mann was selected as the MP.

== Notable people ==
- Qimat Rai Gupta, an entrepreneur, and founder, former chairman and managing director of Havells, a global electrical company
- Tarlochan Singh Kler, an interventional cardiologist, medical administrator, writer, chairman at Fortis Heart and Vascular Institute, and receiver of Padam Bhushan award

== Gallery ==
=== Monuments and attractions of Malerkotla ===
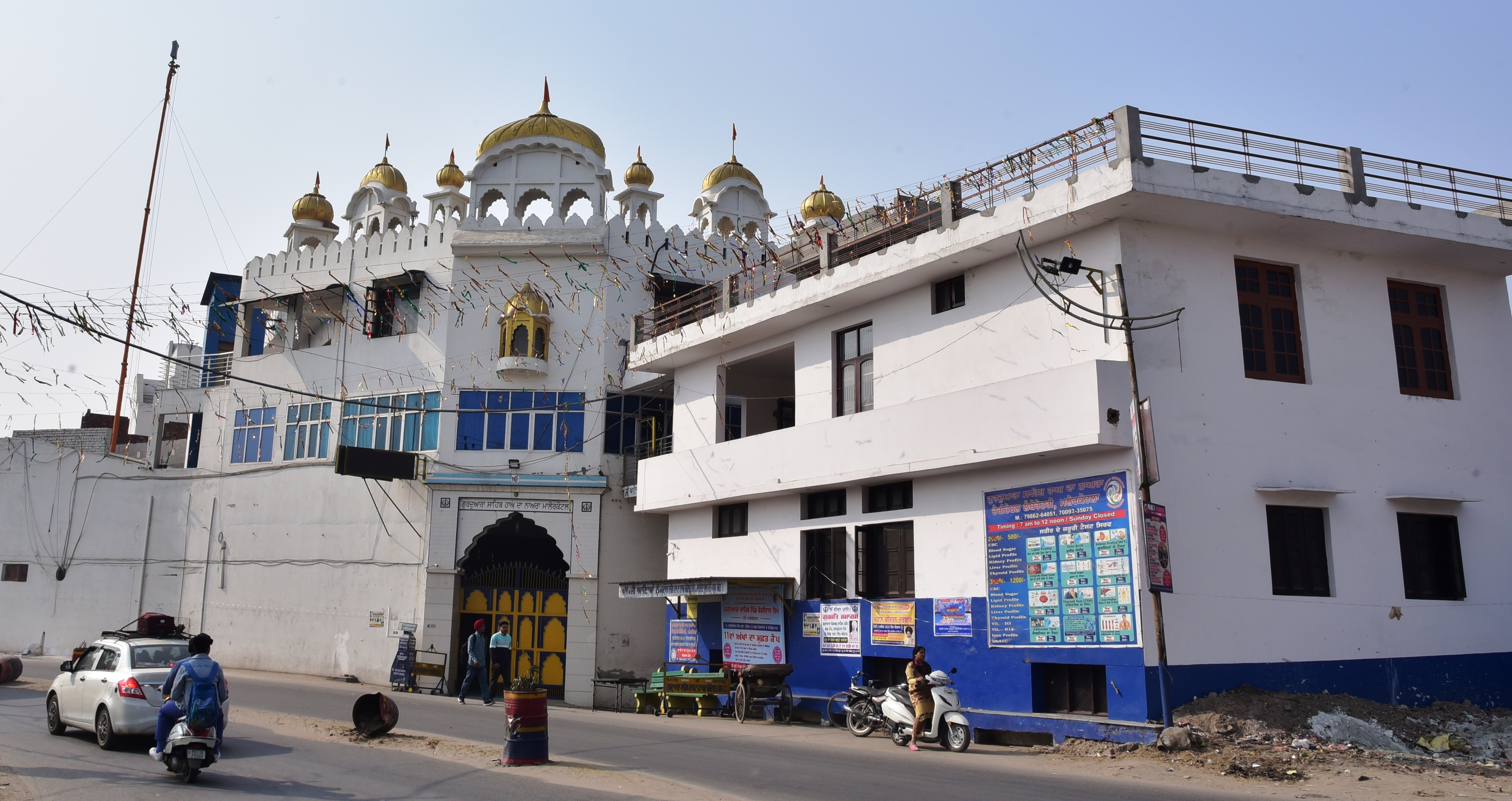
Gurudwara Sahib Haaw Da Naara

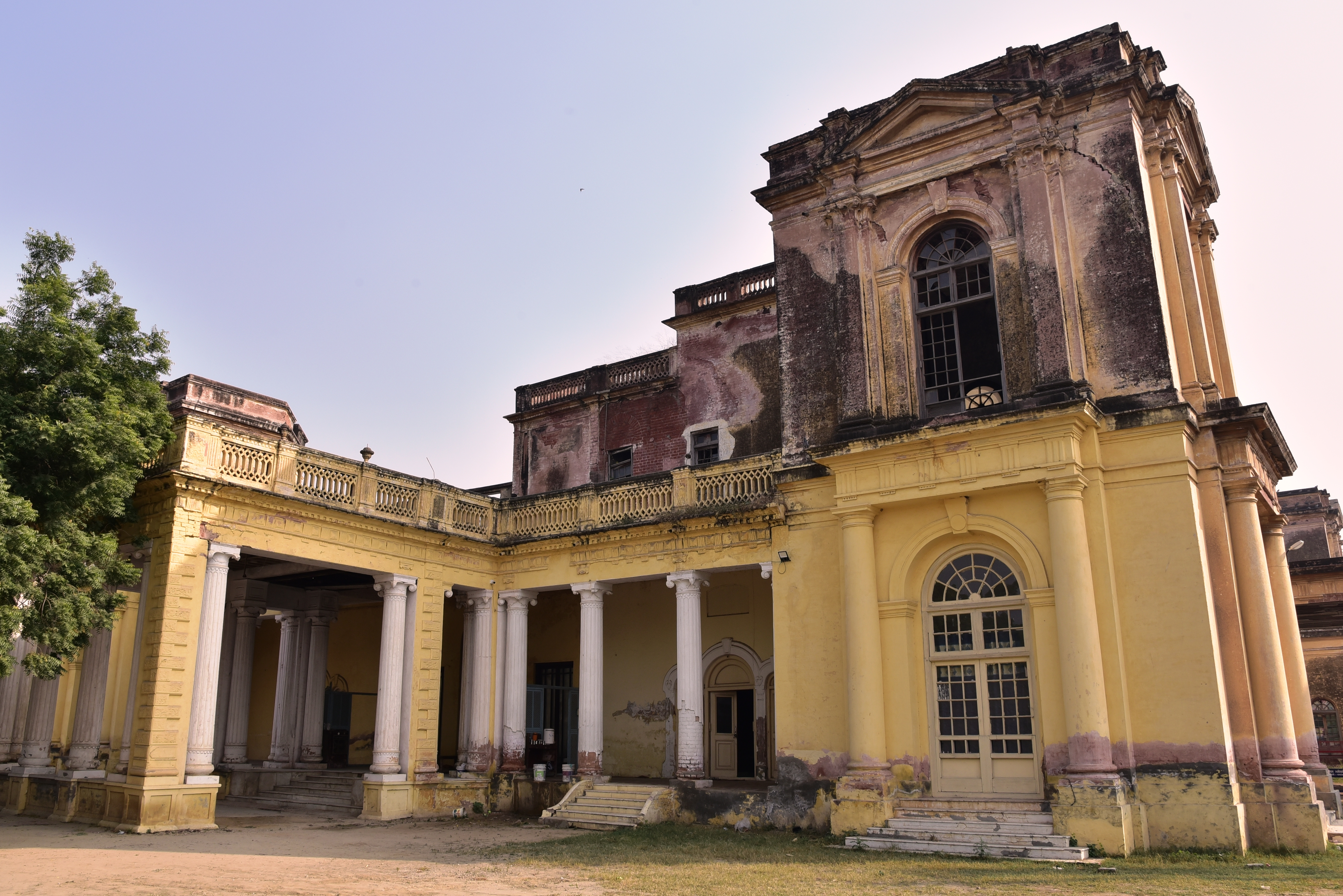
Mubarak Manzil Palace

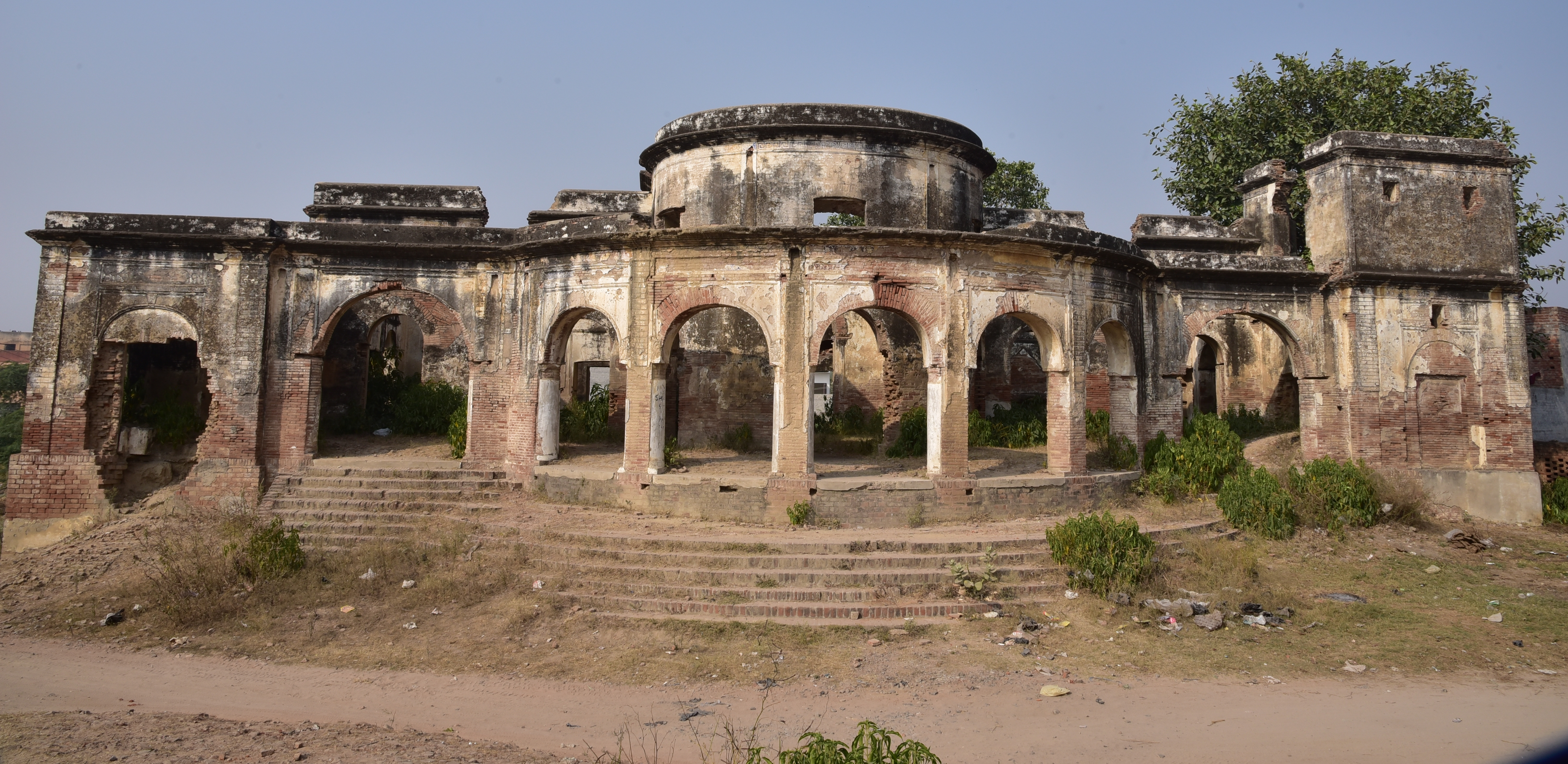
Qila

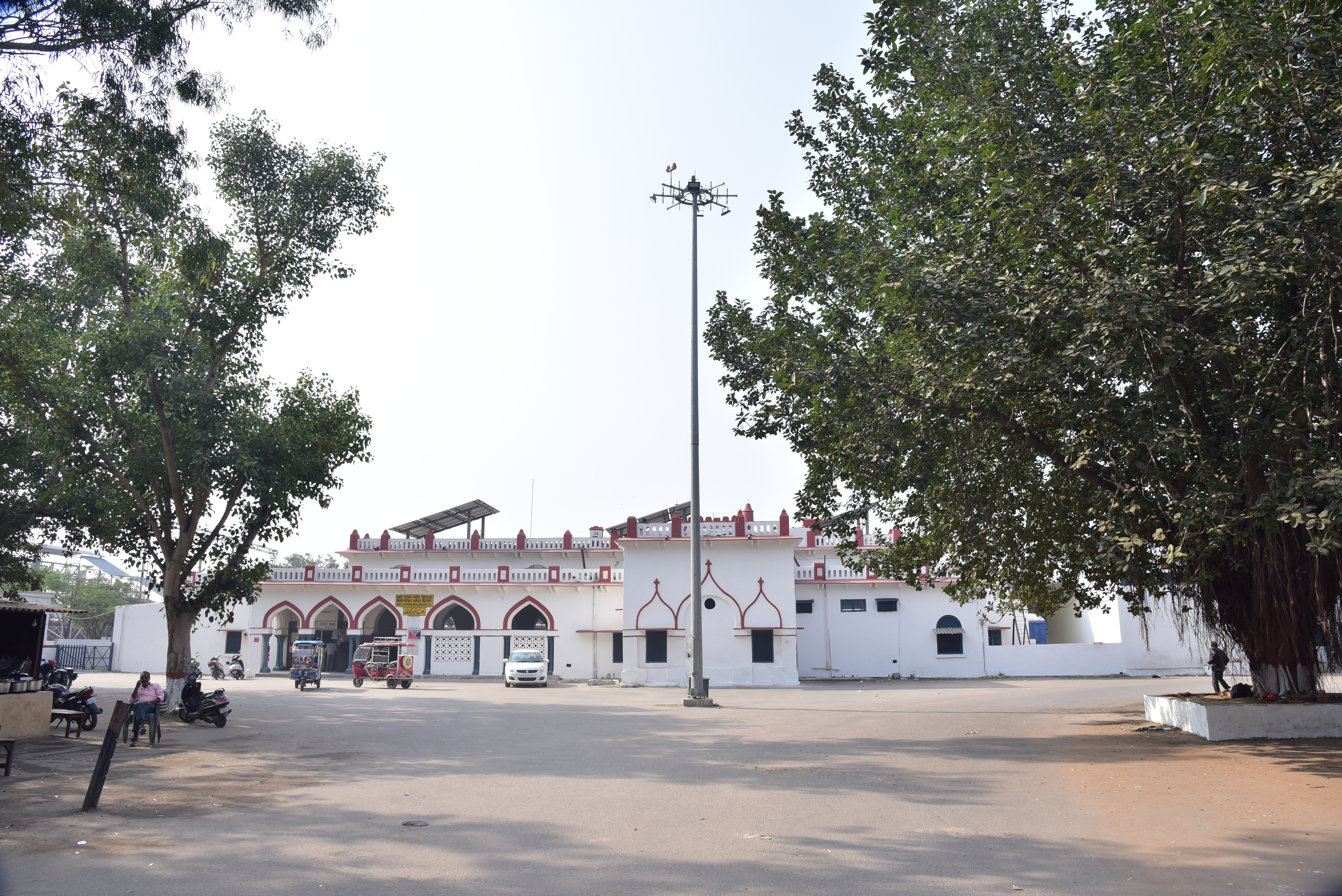
Railways Station

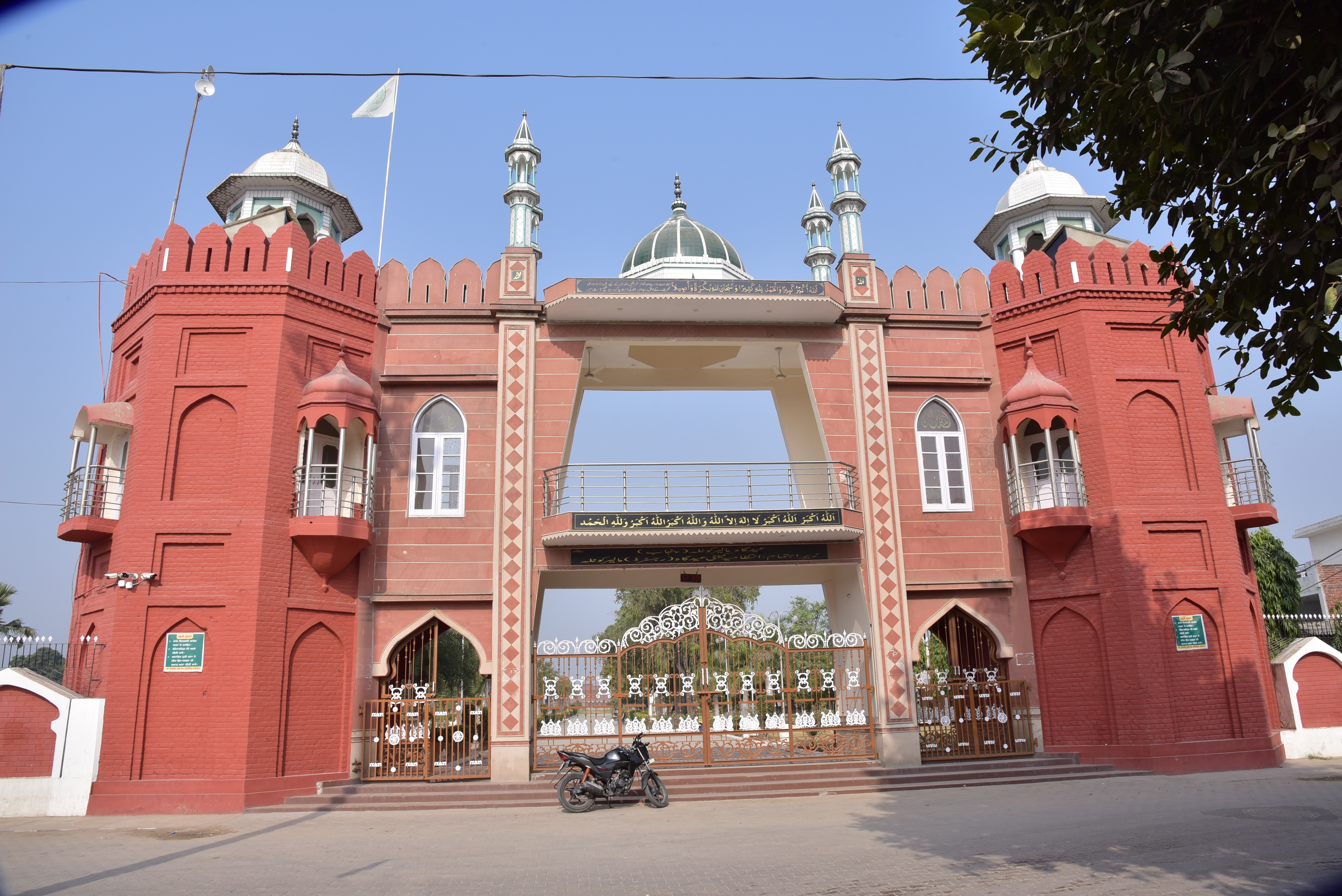
Eidgah

== See also ==
- Malerkotla State
