= Brahmgiani =

Highly enlightened individual

Brahmgiani (Punjabi: ਬ੍ਰਹਮਗਿਆਨੀ (Gurmukhi)) in Sikhism is a highly enlightened individual being who is one with Waheguru. In Sikhism, such a person has also been named a Gurmukh, Sadhu or Sant. Other derivations of Brahmgiani have come from one possessing the knowledge of Brahman.

== Concept ==
=== Usage ===
Brahmgiani is explained in poetry from Guru Arjan and Guru Nanak in the Sukhmani. It is also mentioned in the Guru Granth Sahib, specifically in pages 1289 and 1290.

=== Traits ===
The Brahmgiani in the Sikh worldview represents the spiritually perfected person who transcends ego and worldly attachment. Hence, a person that attains the state of Brahmgiani represents the complete embodiment of Godly traits such as kindness and humility embodied within the person.

== See also ==
- List of Hindu gurus and sants
- Sant Mat or Path of the Sants
