= Ahmedgarh =

- City
- Nickname: Mandi
- Location in Punjab, India
- Coordinates: 30.678°N 75.827°E
- Country: India
- State: Punjab
- District: Malerkotla

Area
  - Total: 6 km^{2} (2.3 sq mi)

Population (2024)
  - Total: 43,000
  - Density: 7,200/km^{2} (19,000/sq mi)

Languages
  - Official: Punjabi
- Time zone: UTC+5:30 (IST)
- PIN: 148021
- Telephone code: 01675
- Vehicle registration: PB 82

Ahmedgarh is a city and a municipal council the Indian state of Punjab. It is 18km away from Malerkotla, the district headquarters, 25km away from Ludhiana city.

== Geography ==
The city lies about 18km north of Malerkotla on Punjab State Highway 11. It is 50km from Sangrur, 26km from Ludhiana, and 98km from Chandigarh.

== Transport ==
It has a railway station on the Ludhiana–Jakhal line and has a bus stand.

== Design ==
Ahmedgarh is an example of pre-independence town planning. It was planned as a market town on the model of Lyallpur (now Faisalabad) in Pakistan.

The planning consisted of a cross-axis of two main avenues along which auctioning, vending and storage of agricultural and agriculture-related goods took place. The four quadrants thus constituted the residential quarters for the people. The town was enclosed by a fasil, a brick arched wall with only four staffed entry points for security. Further, each of the four mohallas could be accessed via one of the two gated structures from the main avenues. At the intersection of the two avenues is a public well. The intersection is now known as the Gandhi chowk. The plots abutting the market avenues were 16 feet wide and ranged from 150 to 240 feet in length. Each plot was constructed with a facade featuring three Mughal arches, forming a colonnade on both sides of the avenues.

At a later stage, the avenues were split in two, with shops along the median, hence forming the 8 streets intersecting at Gandhi Chowk. Ahmedgarh is also famous for its grain markets, one in the city, and one in the outskirts.

The wide avenues have been encroached upon from both sides, and only a few buildings retain the arched facade, often found behind several rooms from the entrance to the building.

== Economy ==
Ahmedgarh is an important agricultural market. The main crops brought to this market are paddy, wheat and cotton. Close to two industrial towns of Malerkotla and Ludhiana, a number of small-scale industries operate in and around this town. The city is also famous for agricultural implements such as diggers, plows, and sickles.

Ahmedgarh became one of India's dry ports.

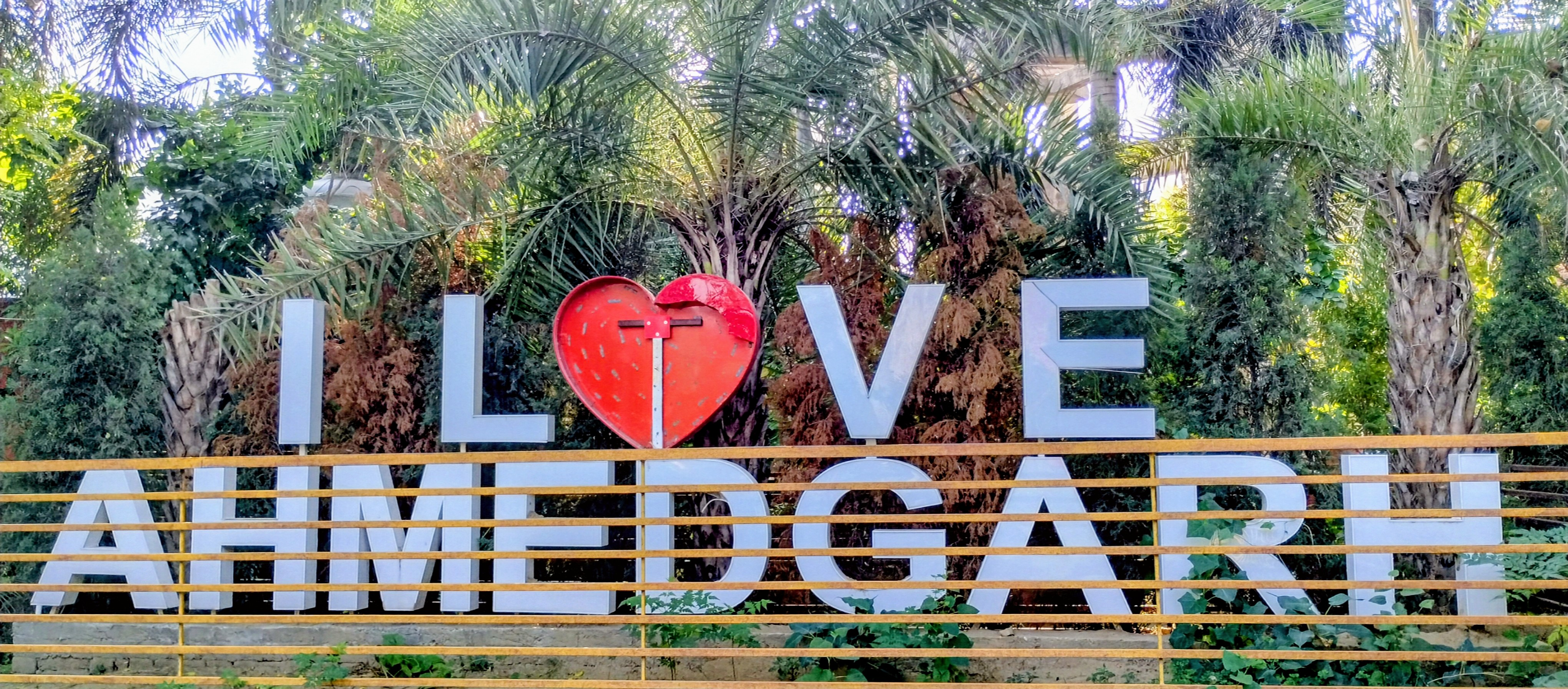

== Literacy ==
The literacy rate of Ahmedgarh city is 83.16%, higher than the state average of 75.84%. In Ahmedgarh, the male literacy is around 87.18% while the female literacy rate is 78.74%.

== Education ==
Ahmedgarh does not have a well developed network of schools and colleges to cater to the resident. Victoria Girls College, Sant Ayurvedic College, and Janta College for Women are among the few reputed colleges that offer good opportunities. Ahmedgarh has both Central Board of Secondary Education and Punjab School Education Board affiliated schools.

== Demographics ==
The estimated population of Ahmedgarh Municipal Council in 2023 was approximately 42,000. The schedule census of 2021 for Ahmedgarh city was postponed due to covid. We believe the new population census for Ahmedgarh city will be conducted in 2023 and the same will be updated once its done. The current data for Ahmedgarh town are estimated only but all 2011 figures are accurate.

Ahmedgarh Caste Factor Schedule Caste (SC) constitutes 16.75% of total population in the Ahmedgarh Municipal Council. The Ahmedgarh Municipal Council currently doesn’t have any Schedule Tribe (ST) population.

Ahmedgarh Work Profile Out of total population, 10,522 were engaged in work or business activity. Of this 9,199 were males while 1,323 were females. In census survey, worker is defined as person who does business, job, service, and cultivator and labour activity. Of total 10522 working population, 97.29 % were engaged in Main Work while 2.71 % of total workers were engaged in Marginal Work.

Religion in Ahmedgarh

1. Hindu: 55.9%
2. Muslim: 13.3%
3. Christian: 0.27%
4. Sikh: 29.6%
5. Jain: 0.87%
6. No Religion: 0.04%

== Attractions ==
=== Parks ===
- Public Park

Location: Near the Civil Hospital.

Features: Large open space, suitable for picnics and outdoor activities.

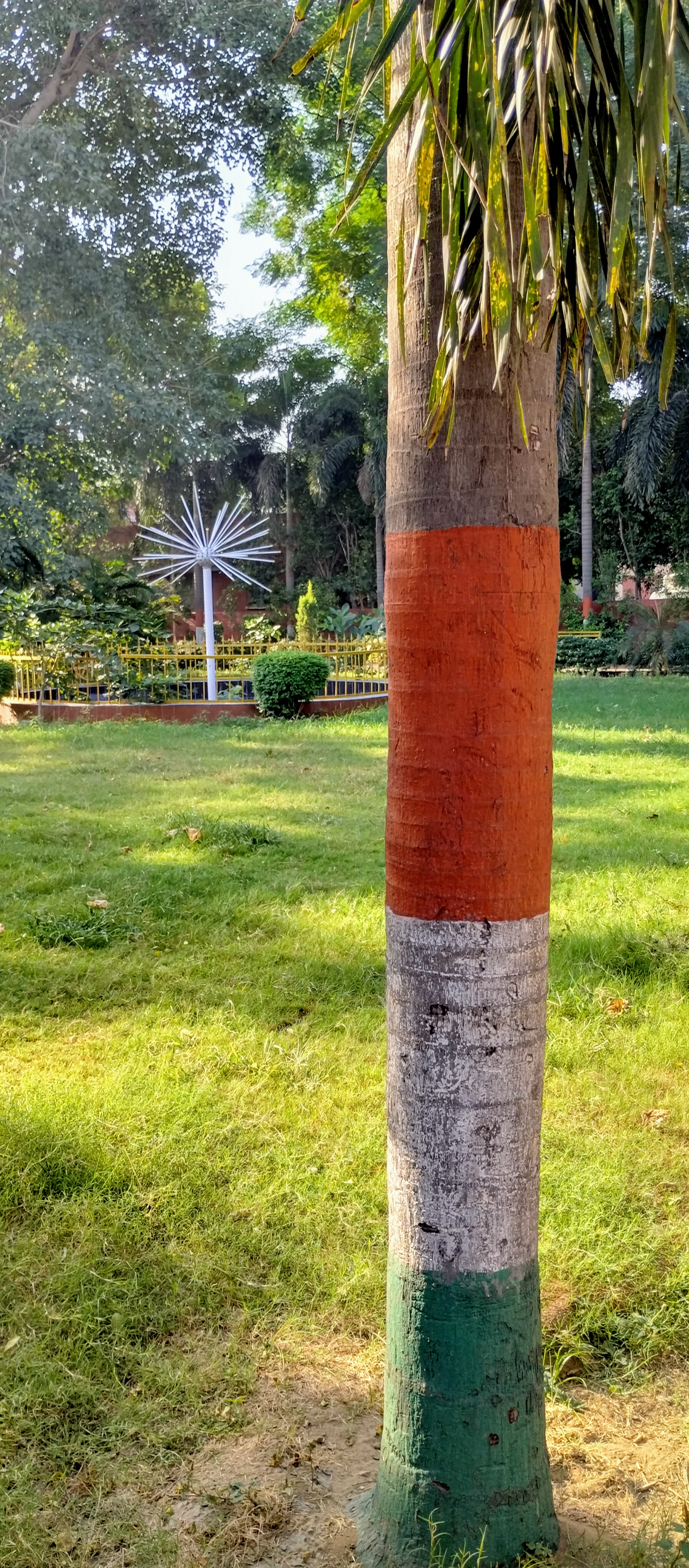
Park on Railway Road in Ahmedgarh

- Ahmedgarh Municipal Park

Location: Chhapar Road.

Features: Large open space, suitable for children playhouse, fountain, gazebo, picnics, and outdoor activities.

- Public Park

Location: Near the Civil Hospital.

Features: Large open play area.

== Schools in Ahmedgarh ==
- MGMN Sen. Sec. School
- GHG Khalsa Sen. Sec. School
- Guru Nanak Kanya Maha Vidyala
- Dav Sen. Sec. School
- Green Valley Public School
- Anand Isher Senior Secondary Public School
- Shanti Tara Collegiate School
- Maya Devi Goyal Public School
- SVM Public School
- Victoria Public School

== Municipal Council ==
Ahmedgarh is a Municipal Council city in district of Malerkotla, Punjab. The Ahmedgarh city is divided into 15 wards for which elections are held every 5 years. The Ahmedgarh Municipal Council has population of 31,302 of which 16,468 are males while 14,834 are females as per report released by Census India 2011.

The Population of children with ages between 0-6 is 3,492, which is 11.16 % of the total population of the Municipal Council. In the Ahmedgarh Municipal Council, the female sex ratio is 901 against the state average of 895. Moreover, the child sex ratio in Ahmedgarh is around 841 compared to the Punjab state average of 846. The literacy rate of Ahmedgarh city is 83.16%, higher than the state average of 75.84 %. In Ahmedgarh, male literacy is around 87.18% while the female literacy rate is 78.74%.

Ahmedgarh Municipal Council has total administration over 6,425 houses to which it supplies basic amenities like water and sewerage. It is also authorize to build roads within Municipal Council limits and impose taxes on properties coming under its jurisdiction.
