= Sects of Sikhism =

Sub-traditions within Sikhism

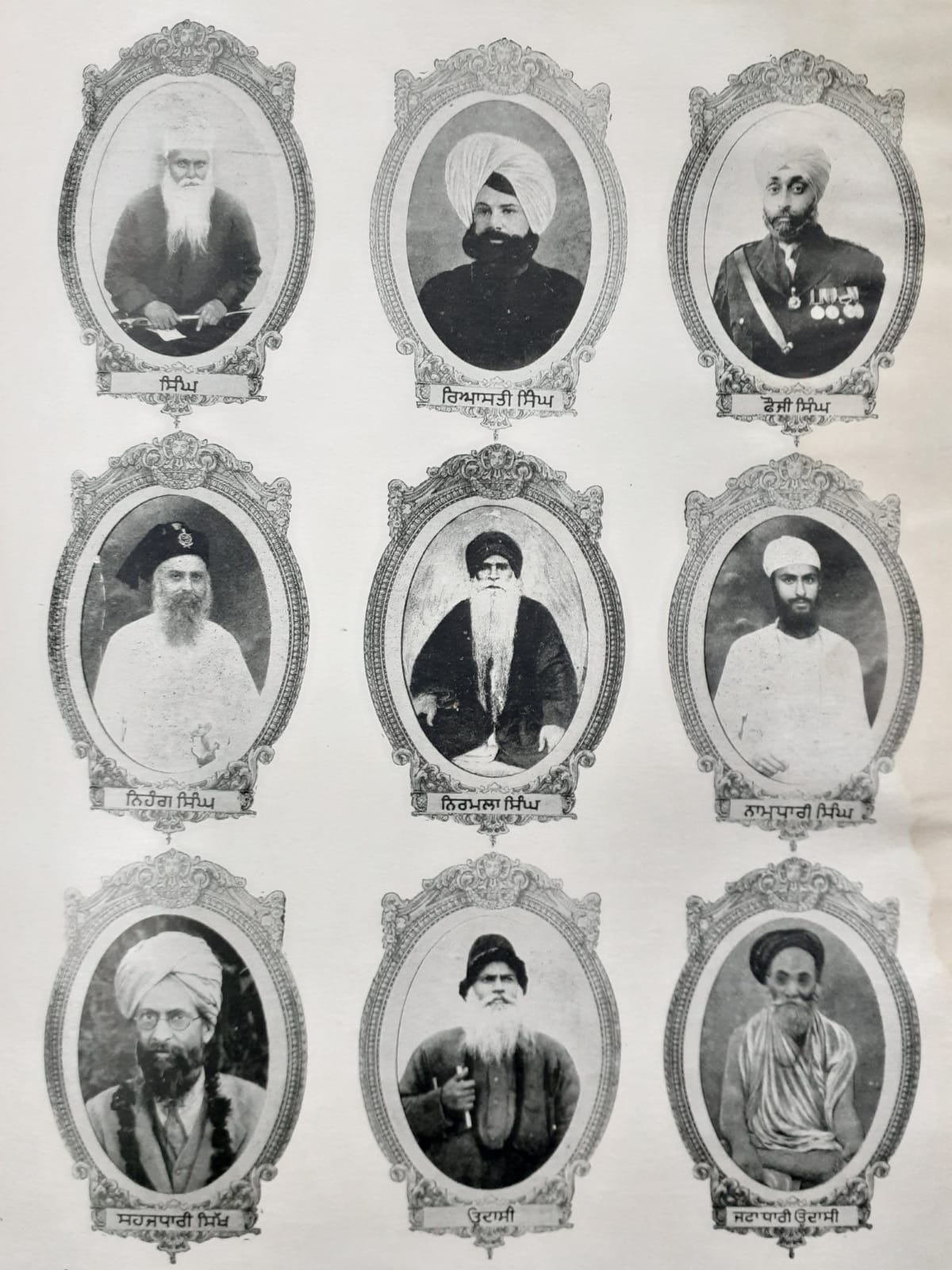
Portrait photographs of Sikh men from various kinds, appearances, and sects of Sikhism, from the 1930 first edition of Mahan Kosh

Sikh sects, denominations, traditions, movements, sub-traditions, also known as sampardai (Gurmukhi: ਸੰਪਰਦਾ; saparadā) in the Punjabi language, are sub-traditions within Sikhism with different approaches to practicing the religion. Sampradas believe in one God, typically rejecting both idol worship and castes. Different interpretations have emerged over time, some of which have a living teacher as the leader. The major traditions in Sikhism, according to Harjot Oberoi, have included Udasi, Nirmala, Nanakpanthi, Khalsa, Sahajdhari, Namdhari (Kuka), Nirankari, and Sarvaria.

During the persecution of Sikhs by Mughals, several splinter groups emerged, such as the Minas and Ramraiyas, during the period between the death of Guru Har Krishan and the establishment of Guru Tegh Bahadur as the ninth Sikh Guru. These sects have had considerable differences. Some of these sects were financially and administratively supported by the Mughal Empire in the hopes of gaining a more favorable and compliant citizenry.

In the 19th century, Namdharis and Nirankaris sects were formed in Sikhism, seeking to reform and return the Sikh faith to its "original beliefs". They also accepted the concept of living gurus. The Nirankari sect, though unorthodox, was influential in shaping the views of Khalsa and the contemporary-era Sikh beliefs and practices. Another significant Sikh break-off sect of the 19th century was the Radha Soami movement in Agra led by Shiv Dayal Singh, who relocated it to Punjab. Other contemporary-era Sikhs sects include 3HO Sikhism, also referred to as Sikh Dharma Brotherhood, formed in 1971 as the Sikh faith in the western hemisphere; Yogi Bhajan led this. See also Dera (organisation) for more examples of Sikh sects.

Some sects of Sikhism are dominated by gradualist (known as sehajdhari) Sikhs rather than baptized (Khalsa) Sikhs; these sects are namely the Udasis, Sewapanthis, Bandais, Nirmalas, Nanakpanthis, Jagiasi-Abhiasi, and Nirankaris. These sehajdhari Sikh sects may come into conflict with more Khalsa-orientated sects, such as regarding the management of Sikh shrines, due to mutual differences, with differences often being resolved through dialogue.

== Overview ==
Some sects originated early-on, such as the sects associated with the Chhota Mel and the Nihangs. According to the Bansavalinama, after the death of Guru Gobind Singh in 1708, four major sects were the Akal Purkhias (associated with the Akal Bunga), the Bandais (associated with the Jhanda Bunga), the followers of Chaubanda, and the Jit Malias. In the 19th century, the Udasis, Nirmalas, Gurus (mostly descendants of the Sikh gurus), Gianis, Bhais, Sants, and Babas were critical in the indigenous Punjabi education system and the transmission of Sanatan Sikhism. Other sects arose during the nineteenth and early twentieth centuries, such as the Nirankaris, Namdharis, and contemporary Sant Mat derived movements that are tangentially related to Sikhism, such as the Radhasoamis. In the 20th century, there were movements and organizations such as the Nanaksaris, Guru Nanak Nishkam Sevak Jatha, Sachkhand Nanak Dham, and Sikh Dharam in the Western Hemisphere that arose. Some sects were intellectual traditions which produced literature, such as the Gianis, Udasis, and Nirmalas.

== Early Sikh sects ==
These distinguished ways or paths are termed sampradaya or samprada. In the past, this term has been misinterpreted or conveyed to the public as 'sects' or 'cults'—terms that incorrectly imply deviation arising from dissent with practiced beliefs. The term samprada does not mean 'sect' but rather order, as in an order of monks. In this sense, a sampradaya represents one of several mutually complementary orders—each of the major traditional sampardas claims to have begun with the Gurus.

Two Sikh sects in the guruship period who were antipathic to the orthodox lineage of Sikh gurus were the Minas and Hindalis. Both these groups of sectarian Sikhs produced literature promoting their interpretations and views, albeit with the Hindalis producing less literature compared to the Minas. At some point, the Minas took control of the Darbar Sahib complex in Amritsar during the 17th century, with them being a major opponent of the mainstream Sikhs.

=== Nanakpanthi ===
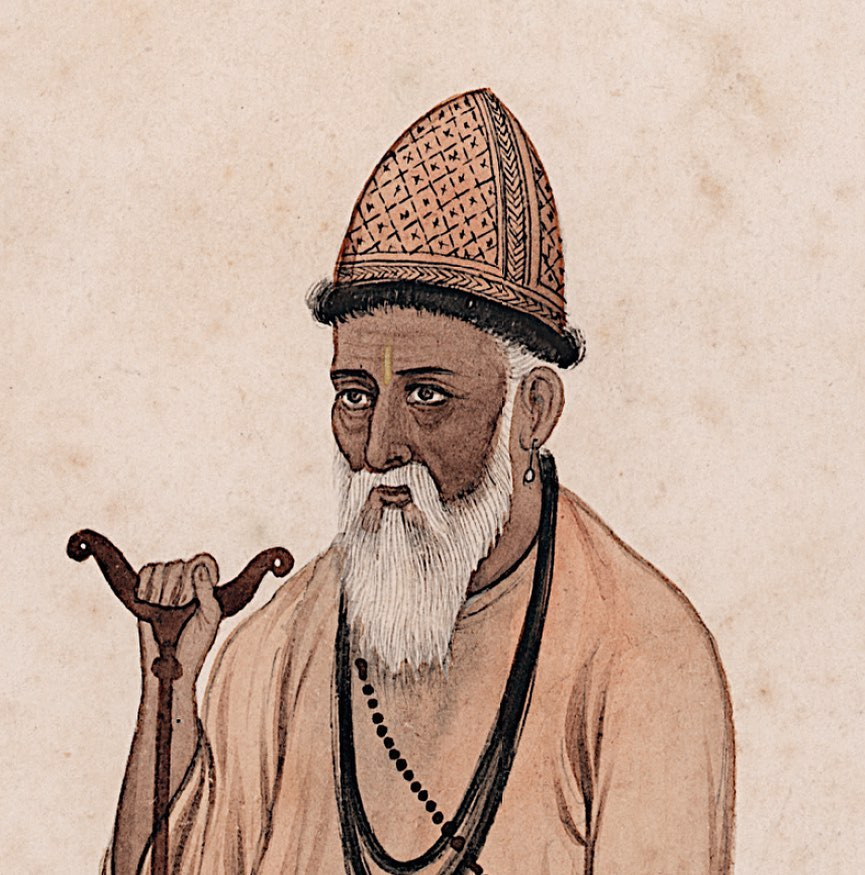
Painting of a Nanakpanthi, by Kapur Singh, Amritsar, ca.1860–65

A Nanakpanthi is a follower of the teachings of Guru Nanak, the first guru of Sikhism. The community transcends the boundaries of Sikhism and Hinduism and was also a reference to the early Sikh community. Most Sindhi Hindu people are Nanakpanthi, and during the 1881 and 1891 censuses, the community could not decide whether to self-identify as Hindu or Sikh. In 1911, Shahpur District (Punjab) reported 12,539 Hindus (20% of the total Hindu population) identifying themselves as Nanakpanthi, in addition to 9,016 Sikhs (22% of the total Sikh population). The institutional focus of Nanakpanthi social life was around a dharamsala, playing the same role before the 20th century as the Gurdwara has played thereafter under Khalsa dominated period. The beliefs and practices of the Nanakpanthis overlapped with those of Sahajdhari and Udasi Sikhs in pre-20th century period, as evidenced by documents dated to that period. In 1891 Census of British India, which was the first to categorise Sikhs into sects, 579,000 people identified themselves as "Hindu Nanakpanthi" and another 297,000 as "Sikh Nanakpanthi". The other major Sikh categories were Sikh Kesdhari and Gobind Singhi Sikhs in this census. Many Muslims also consider themselves as Nanakpanthis.

=== Udasi ===
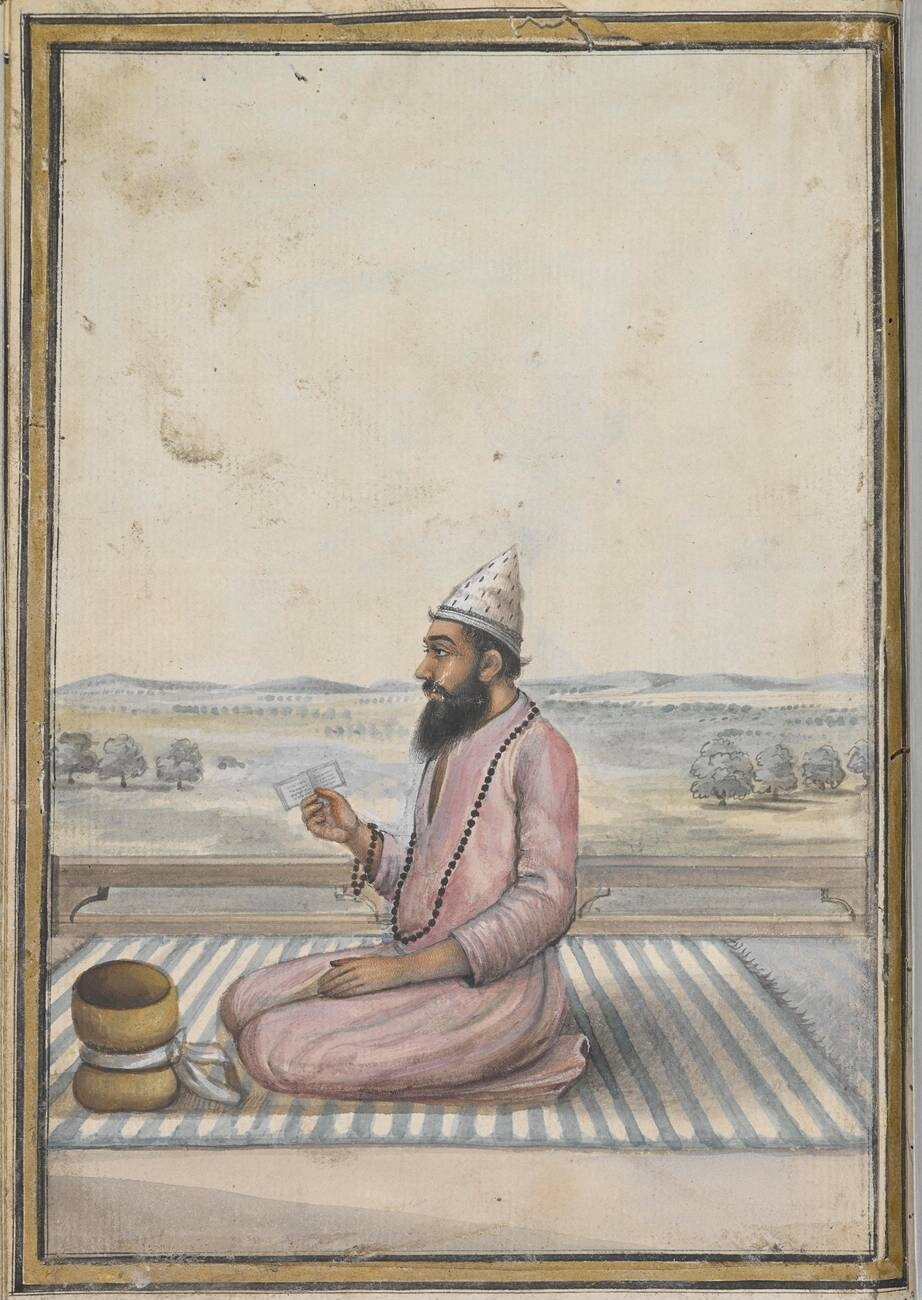
Painting of a member of the Udasi sect from a manuscript of the Fuqara'-i Hind, circa early-19th century

Udasi, derived from the Sanskrit word "Udasin", meaning "detached, journey", reflecting an approach to spiritual and temporal life, is an early sect based on the teachings of Guru Nanak's elder son Sri Chand (1494–1643), who, contrary to his father's emphasis on participation in society, propagated ascetic renunciation and celibacy. Another Sikh tradition links the Udasis to Baba Gurditta, the eldest son of Guru Hargobind, and there is dispute on whether the Udasis originated with Sri Chand or Gurditta. Udasis were some of the first proselytisers of Sikhism.

They maintain their own parallel line of gurus from Guru Nanak, starting from Sri Chand followed by Gurditta. They first came to prominence in the 17th-century, and gradually began to manage Sikh shrines and establishments in the 18th century, from where they espoused a model of Sikhism that diverged considerably from that of the Khalsa. They would set up establishments across North India through to Benares, where they would come to be ideologically joined with monastic asceticism. The combination of Hindu devas and the Sikh religious text indicated that the sect evolved over time under many historical influences and conditions, interpreting the message of Guru Granth Sahib in monistic Vedantic terms. They were initially based mainly in urban centers where they set up their establishments, or akharas, only beginning to spread into rural areas during Sikh rule.

According to 18th-century descriptions, they either cut or matted hair under a turban, rather than a knot under a turban like Khalsas, and instead of the Khalsa emphasis on the panj kakkar garb and sporting arms, their dress code would include items such as a cap (seli topi), a cotton bag, a flower rosary, a vessel made of dried pumpkin, a chain around the waist, ash (vibhuti) to smear on their body, and a deerskin upon which to perform hatha yoga, resulting in a highly divergent appearance from Khalsa Sikhs in the eighteenth century. The Udasis considered secular pursuits to be incompatible with personal salvation, which was to be achieved only through renouncing the world, espousing asceticism and a monastic traveler lifestyle. Udasis are known for their Akharas along with the Nirmala sect of Sikhism. Many Udasis actually took Amrit and have become members of the Khalsa.

During the era between the martyrdom of Banda Singh Bahadur in 1716 and the rise of Ranjit Singh and the Sikh Empire, they were among the few sects able to build and manage Gurdwaras and train apprentices; they were scholars in both Sanskrit and Persian. They were respected and patronised through land grants during Sikh rule. With a broad reach due to their syncretic nature between Sikhism and Hinduism, they were able to derive significant acceptance during the era of armed struggle in Punjab, bringing a large number of people into the Sikh fold during the 18th and the early 19th centuries. They greet each other with "Om Namo Brahmane," and attribute their origin to the mythic Sanandan Kumar, the son of Brahma. When the Singh Sabha Movement, dominated by Reformist Khalsa Sikhs, codified the Sikh identity in the early 20th century, the increasingly corrupt and hereditary Udasi mahants were expelled from the Sikh shrines. After the standardisation of Sikh identity after the Singh Sabha movement, the Udasis increasingly regarded themselves as Hindus rather than Sikhs.

=== Jagiasi ===
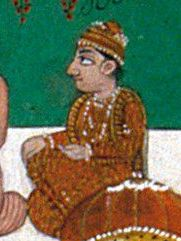
Detail of Lakhmi Das, younger son of Guru Nanak and purported founder of the Jagiasi sect, from a 19th-century painting

Jagiasi, also known as Jagiasu or Jijnasu (from the Sanskrit word jijñāsā meaning "desire to know"), was a sister-sect to the Udasis, with the differences being that whilst the Udasi trace their origin to Sri Chand, Guru Nanak's eldest son, the Jagiasu claim to have been founded by Lakhmi Das, the younger son of Guru Nanak. Another difference is while the Udasis follow a lifestyle of celibacy and asceticism, following in the footsteps of their founder, who was a recluse, the Jagiasu on the other hand promote and live the life of a householder, known as grist marg. The sect was prevalent during the period of Baba Gurupat (also known as Bawa Gurpat Saheb), who was a 12th generation descendant of Guru Nanak. Baba Gurupat conducted missionary works in Sindh and founded many Jagiasu tikanas (seats; a term for a place of worship in many Sikh sects) in the region, specifically in Khairpur, Hyderabad, Halani, and Kandyaro. Whilst they venerate the Guru Granth Sahib, they tend to forgo the Amrit Sanskar baptism ceremony to become initiated Khalsa but a few of them are Khalsas. Furthermore, their beliefs and practices show tinges of religious syncretism with Hinduism. They maintain a close relationship with and similarities to their sibling sect, the Udasis. Some notable figures of this sect were Bhagat Jawahar, Baba Sangatan, Baba Sadhu Ram, and Baba Bhagwan Das of Kaimalpur.

=== Sanwal Shahis ===
The Sanwal Shahis were a Sikh sect founded by one of the disciples of Guru Nanak. They were found mainly in southwestern Punjab.

=== Gangushahis ===
The Gangushahis are a sect that can be traced back to Gangu Shah, also known as Gangu Das, who was a manji preacher assigned by Guru Amar Das to the Shivalik Hills region, being given a seat in the Sirmur region. Over-time, his preaching attracted many followers, with the group growing into their own order. The great-grandson of Gangu, Javahar Singh, consolidated a new sect of Sikhs based on the following of Gangu. (Note: Javahar Singh's forename is alternatively spelt as 'Jawahar'.) The Gangushahis constructed their own shrines at Daun (near Kharar in Ropar district), which had been built under Gangu Shah, and Khatkar Kalan (near Banga in Jalandhar district), which had been constructed under Javahar Singh.

The Gangushahis were excommunicated by the Khalsa when their incumbent gaddi, Kharak Singh, in circa 1708 (around the time of Guru Gobind Singh's death), said the rest of the Sikhs congregations were "widowed" since no Sodhi was on the gaddi, implicitly implying that he is left to lead the Sikhs as a guru. Furthermore, there are claims he performed miracles. The Gangushahis under Kharak Singh were against the Khande di Pahul ceremony, instead advocating for the original Charan Amrit initiation ceremony.

Gangushahis still exist today, albeit in small numbers, inhabiting the Shivalik Hills region, particularly in the areas of Jauharsar, Pinjaur, Dagshai, and Nahan. They maintain their own deras, and they do not strictly adhere to mainstream Sikh customs nor rehat (codes of conduct).

=== Minas ===
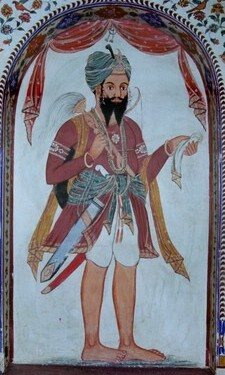
Fresco of a Mina Sikh from Pothi-Mala, Guru Harsahai, Punjab

The Mina sect followed Baba Prithi Chand (1558–1618), the eldest son of Guru Ram Das, after the younger brother Guru Arjan was officially made the next Guru. Called Minas by the orthodox Sikhs, a derogatory term meaning "scoundrels", An alternate non-derogatory term for them has been the Miharvan Sikhs, after the son of Prithi Chand. This sect was shunned by orthodox Sikhs, declared by Guru Gobind Singh as one of the five Panj Mel that a Sikh must avoid.

They emerged in a period of religious persecution and inner dispute within the Sikh tradition during the 17th century on the appropriateness of violence and non-violence in the pursuit of religious freedoms and spiritual matters. According to Hardip Syan and Pritam Singh, Miharvans emphasised more of the non-militant approach of Guru Nanak and earlier Gurus in theological pursuits, while the Guru Hargobind followers pursued the "miri piri" approach and began militarising the Sikh tradition to resist the Mughal persecution. The Minas controlled Amritsar and Harmandir Sahib built under Guru Arjan for much of the 17th century. After the death of Prithi Chand, his son, Meharban, became the next Mina Guru. After Meharban, his son Harji became the successor. After Hariji, the sect would split into different groups.

The Minas faded in the eighteenth century and are now largely extinct.

=== Hindalis ===
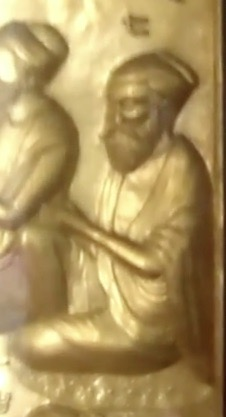
Detail of Baba Hindal from a relief work on a repoussé plaque

A lesser Sikh sect contemporary to the Minas was the obscure Hindalis (Gurmukhi: ਹਿੰਦਾਲੀਏ; hidālī'ē), or Niranjanis (Gurmukhi: ਨਿਰੰਜਨੀਏ; nirajanī'ē), who followed Bidhi Chand of Jandiala (Gurmukhi: ਜੰਡਿਆਲਾ ਦੇ ਬਿਧੀ ਚੰਦ; distinct from Bidhi Chand Chhina), son of Hindal (Gurmukhi: ਹਿੰਦਾਲ or ਹੰਦਾਲ), a resident of Amritsar who became a Sikh during Guru Amar Das' reign, who would follow his father's path, becoming a chief official at a Sikh temple in the town of Jandiala Guru in Amritsar. He would lose his congregation after marrying a Muslim woman, and so would establish a new panth in an effort to undermine Guru Hargobind, propagating his father Hindal to be superior to Guru Nanak, who was relegated to being simply a follower of Kabir. They would not impact Sikh society the way the Minas did, leaving little behind besides a janamsakhi tradition and attempts to link their tradition to Bhai Bala, a Sandhu Jatt, as they were a Jatt-led sect. Despite most Sikh panth being Jatt, the Hindalis did not draw a large following. The Hindalis, compared to the Minas, produced a modest volume of literary contribution. The competing works of the Minas and Hindalis provide insight into early Sikh society and thought. The 18th century Hindali guru of Jandiala, named Aqil Das, conspired against the Sikhs and acted as an informant for the Mughal and Durrani administrations, leading to the deaths of prominent Sikhs, such Mehtab Singh and Taru Singh.

=== Satkatarias ===
The Satkartarias were a sect founded by Sangat Das in the early 1600s, who was a Julha Khatri that lived during the guruship period of Guru Hargobind. The name of the sect was derived from the phrase Sat Kartar (literally "True Creator"), which was often uttered and repeated by Bhai Sangtia (a Sodhi from Lahore), who was initiated into the Sikh religion by Guru Arjan in 1593. According to lore, Guru Arjan blessed Bhai Sangtia with the yogic powers of ridhia and sidhia. Bhai Sangtia gained prestige in the Sikh community after this blessing. There was a belief that anything Bhai Sangtia uttered would come true. Sangat Das was Bhai Sangtia's successor and used his characteristic phrase. Bhai Sangtia chose Sangat Das as his disciple and gave him his seli topi (traditional cap) to mark him as his successor. Both Bhai Sangtia and Sangat Das were reclusive men, often meditating in isolation for long periods of time, with Sangat Das being more extreme in this regard. Followers of the sect use the phrase for both greeting and meditation. Guru Hargobind had permitted Sangat Das to establish his own dharamsala at Sri Hargobindpur, near the riverbank of the Beas. Sangat Das was succeeded by his son, Hazaari Das. Hazaari Das was in-turn succeeded by his own son, Harlal Das. The Guru Granth Sahib is kept at the sect's centre at Sri Hargobindpur. Furthermore, the site has in its possession a claimed relic: a suite of armour that Guru Hargobind had apparently given to Sangat Das. The structure was constructed as a four-story building and became known as Dharamsala Satkartarian, which still operates to this day as the sect's headquarters. Another Satkataria centre would be established in Phagwara by Darbari Das, who was the younger brother of Sangat Das. At Mandi, another centre for the sect was established. There used to be a centre for the sect at Batala, but this site was taken over by the SGPC in 1940, yet it is still known as Gurdwara Satkartarian. The Udasis eventually absorbed the Satkatarias and do not survive as an independent group. Writing in 1926, Pundit Ganesha Singh Nirmala, in his work Bharat Mat Darpan writes that the sadhus of the sect wore deep-red colored or white clothing, but they always wore red-colored turbans. He further notes that all of their practices were like the Udasis, except that they do not mat their hair nor spread ash on their body.

=== Suthrashahis ===
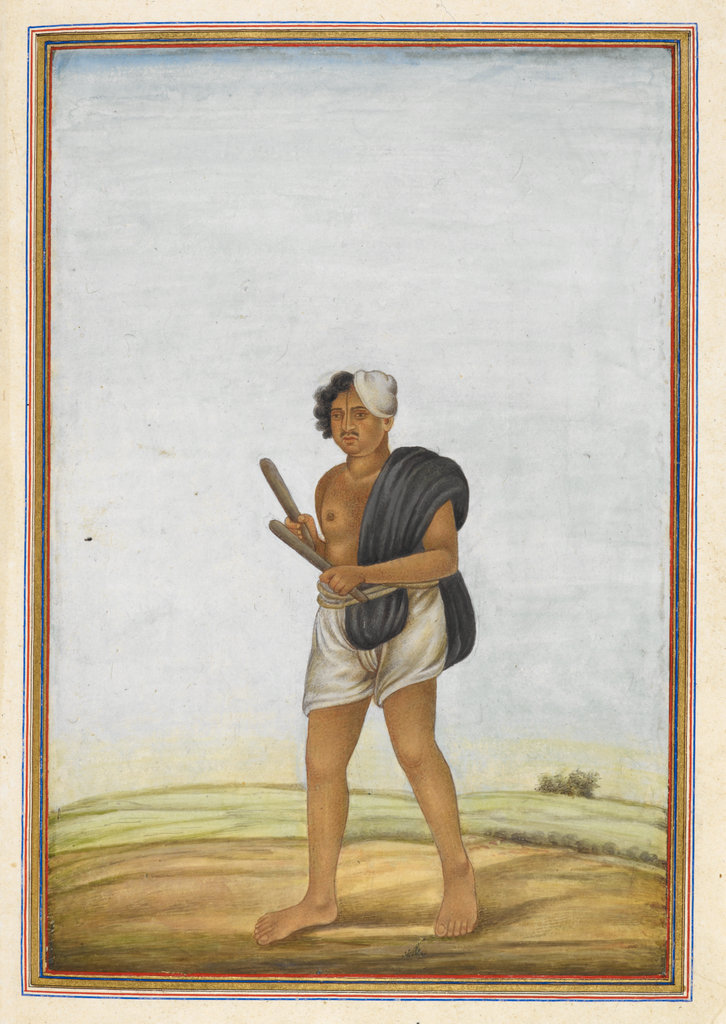
Depiction of a Sutra Shahi Sikh adorned with the mark of black ash on the forehead, a 'Seli Topi' and 2 Fakir sticks, circa late 18th century.

Suthrashahis were a sect of Sikhism founded by Suthra Shah (1625-1682), a disciple of Guru Hargobind. Suthra Shah was born into a Nanda Khatri family in what is now Gurdaspur district. The order practiced mendicancy, carrying two wooden sticks they struck together while soliciting alms. In Frans Balthazar Solvyns' 1796 work A Collection of Two Hundred and Fifty Coloured Etchings: Descriptive of the Manners, Customs and Dresses of the Hindoos, Solvyns included a depiction of a "Naunuk Punthy" in Calcutta with one shoe, half a mustache, and two sticks, who may have actually been a Suthrashahi. The Suthrashahis are categorised as a sub-sect under the Udasi sect.

=== Ramraiyas ===
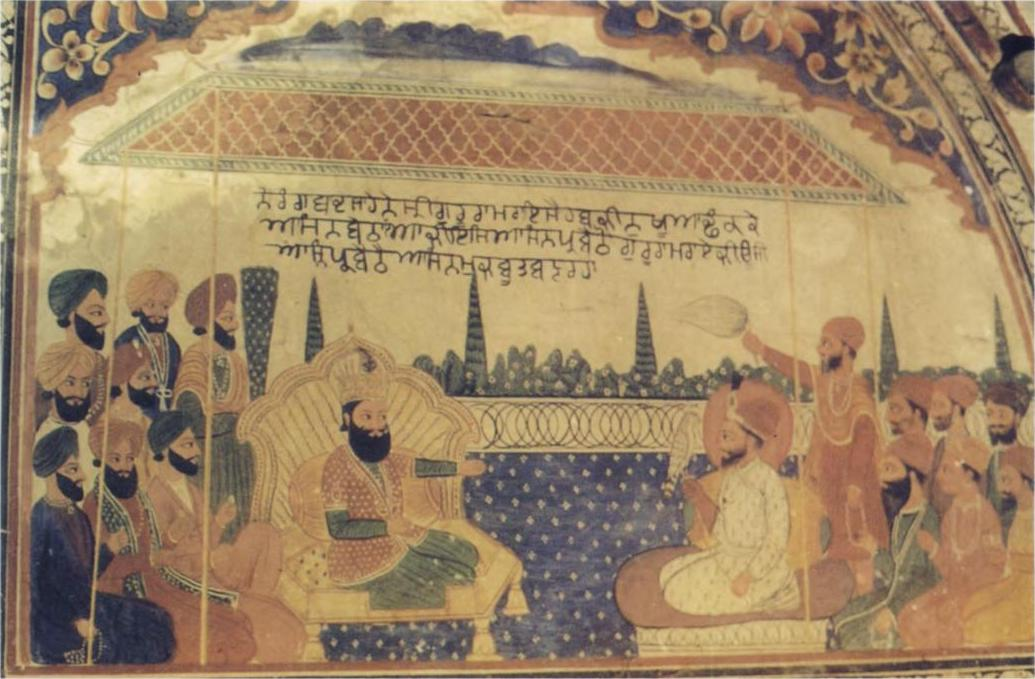
Mural of Guru Ram Rai (seated, right) in-conversation with Aurangzeb (seated, left) on a terrace. The mural is located at the Guru Ram Rai Darbar Sahib complex at Dehradun, Uttarakhand, India.

Ram Raiyas were a sect of Sikhism who followed Ram Rai, the eldest son of Guru Har Rai. He was sent by his father as an emissary to the Mughal emperor Aurangzeb in Delhi. Aurangzeb objected to a verse in the Sikh scripture (Asa ki Var) that stated, "the clay from a Musalman's grave is kneaded into potter's lump", considering it an insult to Islam. Ram Rai explained that the text was miscopied and modified, substituting "Musalman" with "Beiman" (faithless, evil), which Aurangzeb approved. The willingness to change a word led Guru Har Rai to bar his son from his presence. Aurangzeb responded by granting Ram Rai a jagir (land grant) in the Garhwal Kingdom (Uttarakhand). The city later came to be known as Dehradun, after Dehra referring to Ram Rai's shrine. Many Sikhs settled with Ram Rai, they followed Guru Nanak, but orthodox Sikhs have shunned them. They were one of the Panj Mel, the five reprobate groups that orthodox Sikhs are expected to shun with contempt. The other four are the Minas, the Masands, the Dhirmalias, and the Sir-gums (those Sikhs who accept Amrit baptism but subsequently cut their hair). According to census figures, over 82,000 Sikhs and Hindus returned their census forms claiming to be Ramraiyas in the 1891 British Raj census. The sect today is based out of Dehradun.

=== Dhirmalias ===
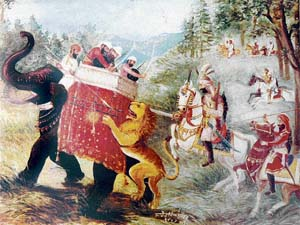
Painting of Sadhu Singh Sodhi hunting a lion with his entourage. He was a descendant of Dhir Mal, circa late 19th century

The Dhirmalias were a heretical sect founded by Dhir Mal, the eldest son of Gurditta and grandson of Guru Hargobind. Dhir Mal is considered a traitor by mainstream Sikhs due to his greed for the guruship, wealth, and power. Guru Gobind Singh forbade his Sikhs from having any relation with Dhirmalias. The sect was awarded the original manuscript of the Adi Granth, which was prepared by Guru Arjan and his scribe Bhai Gurdas, in 1643. This manuscript is known as the Kartarpur Bir. The Sodhis of Kartarpur claim to be their descendants and have in their possession the manuscript. Also, a shrine dedicated to Dhir Mal is located in Kartarpur as well. Vadhbag Singh Sodhi, an 18th-century descendant of the Sikh Gurus, was a prominent figure of the sect. Dhir Mal's great-grandson, Bikram Singh, would later give up connections to the sect and be baptised into the Khalsa order and become a mainstream Sikh.

=== Bhai Daya Singh Samparda ===
Bhai Daya Singh Samparda (Punjabi: ਭਾਈ ਦਯਾ ਸਿੰਘ ਸੰਪਰਦਾ [Gurmukhi]), also known as Nirmal Sant Samparda, is a traditional Khalsai order, tracing back to the tenth Sikh Guru, Guru Gobind Singh. This lineage was founded by Bhai Daya Singh, the Mukhi of the original Panj Pyaare, under the hukam of Guru Gobind Singh in the early 1700s, aiming to pass down the divine knowledge of Naam and Gurbani to the community. The word 'Sant' translates to 'saint', an enlightened being who has attained spiritual enlightenment and divine knowledge through union with God. Many prominent saints have emerged from this Samparda, including Baba Sahib Singh Bedi, Baba Maharaj Singh, Sant Karam Singh, Sant Isher Singh, Sant Ranjit Singh Virakt. Through the ceremony of Amrit Sanskaar, they have said to initiate countless individuals into the Khalsa Panth, spreading the teachings of the Sikh Gurus and spiritually guiding the community.

During the Misl-era, Baba Sahib Singh Bedi was a respected figure, both as the descendant of Guru Nanak and as a renowned saint. Baba Sahib Singh Bedi was greatly respected by the Sikh misldars (chiefs) during the era of the Sikh Confederacy and acted as a common uniting cause between the various bickering, rival chiefs against an outside enemy. He played a pivotal role in the unification of the Sikh Misls and the establishment of the Sikh Empire. During the Sikh Empire, Baba Sahib Singh and his successors were respected as the Raj-Gurus of the empire, being recognised with the title of a Guru (Not used to refer to them as the Gurus of the Sikh Panth, but rather in respect of them being spiritual teachers and holy saints). After the death of Maharaja Ranjit Singh, saints like Baba Maharaj Singh (Naurangabad) and Baba Ram Singh Virakt (who was close aide and successor of Maharaj Singh) are known to put up strong resistance against the early British colonial establishment in Punjab. Henry Vansittart, then Jalandhar deputy commissioner, even paid the following tribute to Maharaj Singh by stating: "The Guru [Maharaj Singh] is no ordinary man... He is to the natives what Jesus is to the most zealous of Christians. His miracles were seen by tens of thousands and are more implicitly believed than those worked by the ancient prophets."

Later saints included Sant Karam Singh of Hoti Mardan, who is claimed to be the early central figure in reviving the Gurmat practices by preaching to those from Punjab and beyond. Like his later successor, Sant Isher Singh, 101 of his countless students are claimed to have achieved the renowned spiritual stage of Brahgiani through their spiritual guidance. In respect and recognition of these saints, this samparda also became known as 'Hoti Mardan Samparda' and 'Rara Sahib Samparda', named after Sant Karam Singh and Sant Isher Singh respectively. According to many prominent Sikh figures, Sant Isher Singh is a great Brahmgiani saint, whose life remains a guiding example for Sikhs, and even 50 years after his passing, his spiritual wisdom and kirtan continue to inspire many to walk the path of Gurmat and embrace Gursikhi. The Saints of this lineage have, and continue to spread the teachings of Sikhi across India and abroad.

=== Sewapanthi ===
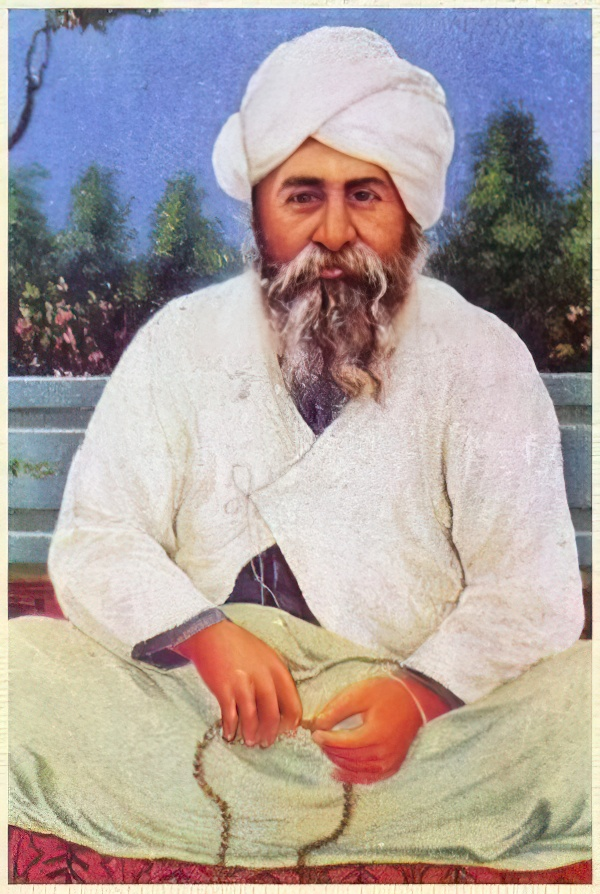
Sewapanthi saint, Mahant Gulab Singh, who was an Amritdhari.

The Sewapanthi (also known as Sevapanthi or Addanshahi) is a traditional samprada of the Sikhs. The Sewapanthis were prevalent in the Sind Sagar Doab. Sewapanthi is a compound word made up of the terms sewa, which means unselfish service, and panthi, panth, which in this case refers to the way, literally means "widened road." As a result, this phrase can be used to describe people who choose the route of selfless service. Sewapanthis wrote many commentaries on Sikh texts, known as steeks or teekas, and wrote many books and gave many lectures exploring Hindu schools of thought, as well as Sufi Mysticism, and famous Islamic writers such as Imam al-Ghazali.

The sewapanthis emerged with Kanhaya Lal, a Dhamman (Dhiman) Khatri, and personal disciple of Guru Tegh Bahadur. He was born in 1648 in the now-Pakistani town of Sohadara. Formerly a Mughal officer, he worked as a menial at the Guru's table day and night, bringing water to the horses and everyone else with him. He learned numerous Sikh spiritual principles from the Guru. In the rugged Attock district of Punjab's Northwest boundary, Bhai Kanhaiya built a Dharamshala (Rest house and shrine). The 10th Guru, Guru Gobind Singh, exempted Khanaiya and his followers from military duty and told him to carry on performing the duty allotted him by his reverend Guru Tegh Bahadur of serving all living beings. In a later battle in Anandpur, Bhai Khanaiya served water indiscriminately to friends and foes alike. For this act, some angry Sikh warriors accused him of treason and brought him before Guru Gobind Singh. When the Guru asked him why he was helping the wounded enemy, he replied that he could not distinguish between friend or foe as he could only "see guru in all." The Guru was pleased, and he then blessed him, saying after him shall be a Sikh order who will serve all humanity indiscriminately. Noor Shah was amongst the Mughal soldiers to whom Bhai Khanaiya had served water. He became a great disciple of Bhai Khanaiya, setting up a Dharamsala of his own. Two of the most prominent followers were Seva Ram and Baba Adan Shah. As such, Sevapanthis are often referred to as Adan Shahi.

The Seva Panthis are pacifists and themselves desist from all forms of violence. Traditionally, the Sevapanthis were associated with the Sehajdharis, as evidenced by their names (Adan Shah, Seva Ram). They are strict pacifists, so they would forego Khande Ki Pahul. Some believe they were exempt from Pahul by Guru Gobind Singh. They are celibate, eat, and share property together. They avoid meat, liquor, and cannabis, and their dress is white. M. A. Macauliffe described them as an orthodox and honourable sect who live by honest labour.

Strong historical links exist between the Udasi and Sewapanthi orders. Very few Sewapanthis exist today.

== 18th century sects ==
=== Tat Khalsa ===
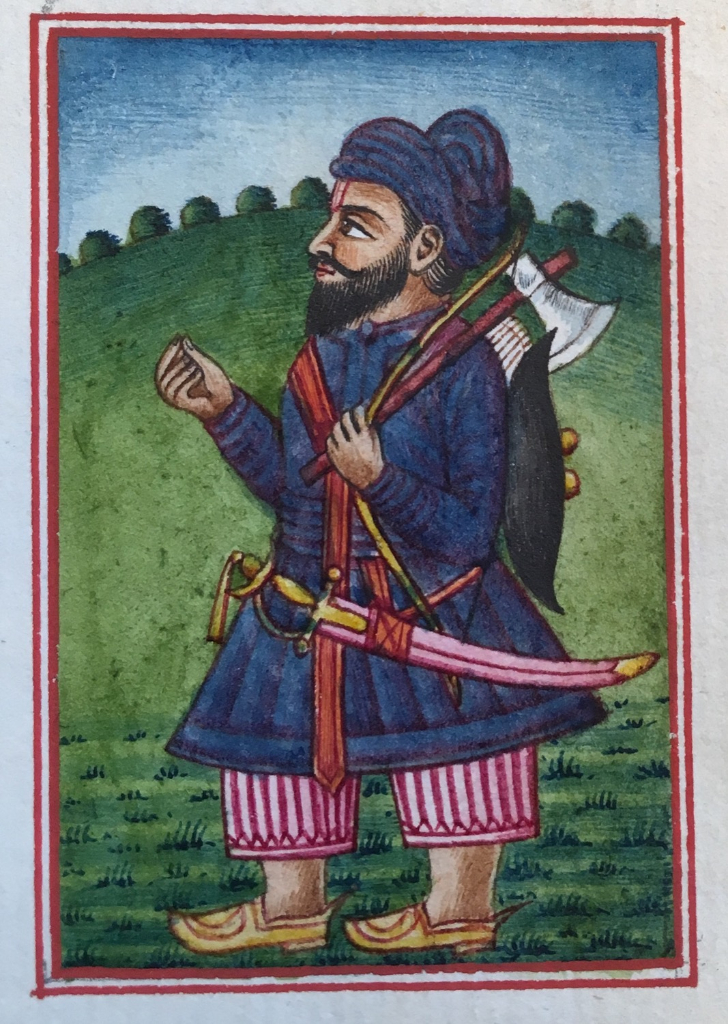
Painting of a "Govindsakhi" from a folio of a manuscript of the Silsilah-i-Jogiyan, ca.1800

The Tat Khalsa (Gurmukhi: ਤੱਤ ਖਾਲਸਾ, translit. tata khālasā), also romanised as Tatt Khalsa, known as the Akal Purkhias during the 18th century, was a Sikh faction that arose from the schism following the passing of Guru Gobind Singh in 1708, led by his widow Mata Sundari, opposed to the religious innovations of Banda Singh Bahadur and his followers. It is regarded as the orthodox and orthoprax sect of Sikhism. "Proper Sikhs" can be those who have been initiated into the Khalsa (amritdharis), those who do not cut their hair (keshdhari), those who are slow-adopters (sehajdharis), or even lapsed Sikhs and apostates (patits).

=== Bandai Khalsa ===
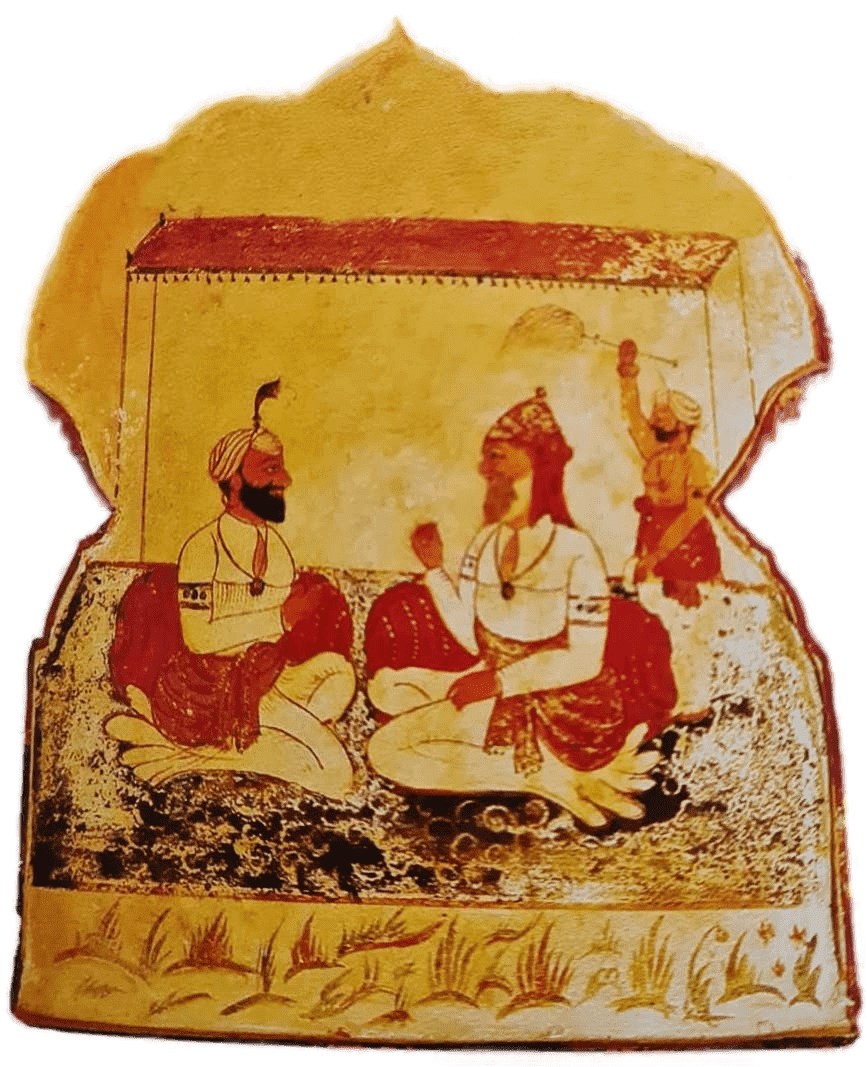
Mural fresco of Banda Singh Bahadur (seated right) with his son, Ranjit Singh [Sodhi] (seated left). An attendant to the right is waving a fly-whisk.

The Bandais were those who believed Banda Singh Bahadur was the spiritual successor of Guru Gobind Singh and therefore the 11th human Guru. This belief created distance between them and the orthodox Sikhs which were led by Mata Sundari (widow of Guru Gobind Singh), who regarded their belief as heretical. They were excommunicated from mainstream Sikhism by the Tat Khalsa faction in 1721. Only a few exist now in the present-day. The Bandais were noted for changing the Khalsa dress code colours from blue to red, using the greeting and jaikara (war-cry): Fateh Darshan (meaning 'bear witness to the victory'), and were staunch vegetarians. The Fateh Darshan battle-cry and greeting was later withdrawn from use by Banda himself due to opposition from orthodox Khalsa and he had not meant to replace the traditional Sikh greetings and jaikaras bestowed upon the Sikhs by the Gurus.

=== Jit Malias ===
The Jit Malias was an 18th century schism that arose after the death of Guru Gobind Singh in 1708. They were the followers of Ajit Singh Palit (adopted son of Mata Sundari) and his son Hathi Singh. Hathi Singh died without a successor.

=== Gulab Raiyas ===
The Gulab Raiyas, also known as Gulab Rahis, were followers of Gulab Rai, who was the son of Dip Chand, grandson of Suraj Mal, and great-grandson of Guru Hargobind. Gulab Rai was baptised into the Khalsa by Guru Gobind Singh himself when the latter was alive. In 1705, during the aftermath of the siege of Anandpur, Guru Gobind Singh sent him and his brother, Shyam Singh, to the state of Nahan, to present an introductory letter to the ruler (who was an ally of the Guru). The Raja of Nahan bestowed Gulab Rai and his brother a village. After, they returned to Anandpur where they set up base after they purchased the locality from the Raja of Bilaspur state. Initially, he rejuvenated the city as a site of Sikhism but eventually Gulab Rai tried to usurp the Sikh guruship for himself. He attempted to emulate the Sikh gurus by sitting at the same spot that Guru Gobind Singh used to sit at in Anandpur and accepted gifts from the Sikh congregation while doing so. An Udasi who was instructed to stay behind at Anandpur to look after the Sikh sites, named Gurbakhsh Udasi, severely reprimanded Gulab Rai for these actions and is said to have cursed him to have no progeny. Gulab Rai set-up himself as a Guru in his own rite. Gulab Rai kept baptising new initiates into his sect with the Charan Pahul ceremony, which had already been replaced in mainstream Sikhism by Guru Gobind Singh's Khande di Pahul innovation. Gulab Rai conspired with his brother, Shyam Singh. Gulab Rai had four sons but none survived him. Gulab Rai is said to have died of grief. After Gulab Rai's passing, his widowed wife assumed the leadership of the sect. She was succeeded by Surjan Singh, the son of Shyam Singh (brother of Gulab Rai). The sect did not survive long and went extinct in the 18th century. Surjan Singh died in 1815.

=== Akali/Nihang ===
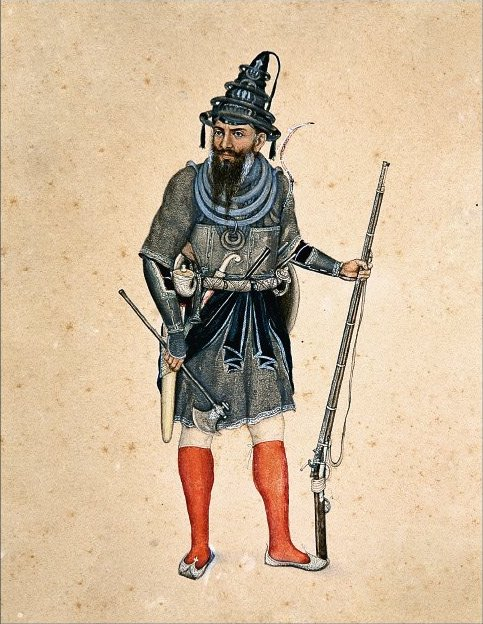
An Akali Nihang wearing his traditional dress (known as Bana or Chola) and covered in weapons.

The armed Sikh warrior organisation called the Nihangs or Akalis, which means "the immortals," was founded in the Indian subcontinent. Nihangs are thought to have come from Guru Hargobind's "Akal Sena" (lit. 'Army of the Immortal') or Baba Fateh Singh from the dress he wore. The Nihangs dominated early Sikh military history and were renowned for their triumphs despite being vastly outnumbered. The Nihangs, who were originally the irregular guerrilla squads of the Sikh Khalsa Army, formed some parts of the armed forces of the Sikh Empire and were historically renowned for their valor and courage on the battlefield. There are four main factions amongst the Nihangs of the modern era, namely: The Budha Dal, Tarna Dal, Bhidi Chand Dal, and Ranghreta Dal. Nihang Samprada is also sometimes collectively called, Dal Khalsa.

The Budha Dal is the largest and most influential of all these four subsections. Some Nihang groups consume small amounts of crushed cannabis in a drink called shaheedi degh (ਭੰਗ), purportedly to help in meditation. Shaheedi Degh without cannabis is called Shardai. It consists of nuts, herbs, some flowers, and a slight amount of cannabis. Nihang Sikhs are also known for their practice of Jhatka.

Nihangs often consider themselves as Kshatriyas and that the whole Khalsa is Kshatriya. The Nihangs were particularly known for their high turbans (dastar bunga) and their extensive use of the chakram or war-quoit. Their turbans were often pointed at the top and outfitted with a chand torra or trident called a gajga which could be used for stabbing in close quarters. They also accept the Dasam and Sarbloh Granth scriptures as extensions of the Guru Granth Sahib. Currently, Dal Khalsa is the largest it has ever been in its entire history.

=== Gianiaan Samparda ===
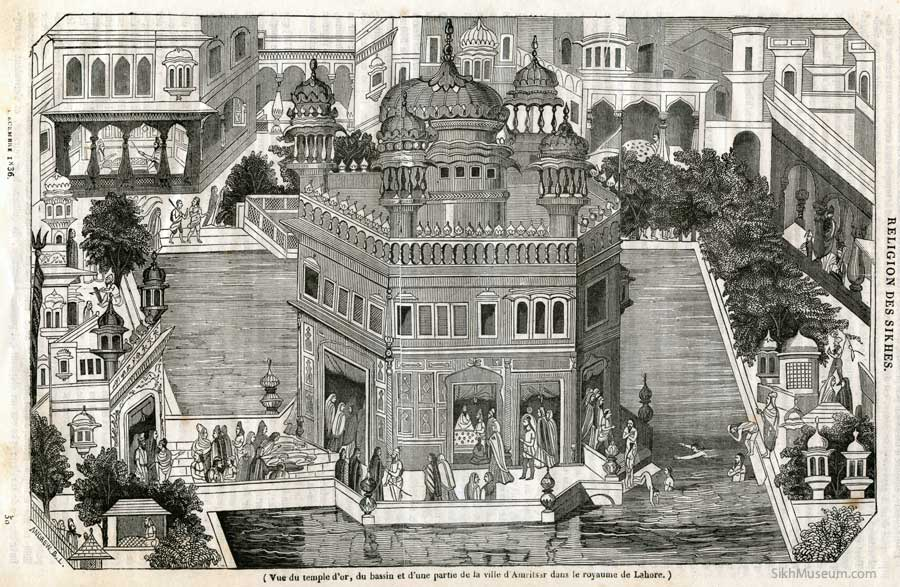
Depiction of the Harmandir Sikh "parikarma" (outskirts); In the top left corner, in a bunga (teaching institute) a student can be seen being instructed.

The Gyaaniyan (Giani) Samparda used to act as a teaching institute (sometimes known colloquially as a bunga) for Sikhism. (Note: Sometimes equated to and used interchangabely with the Damdami Taksal and Amritsari Taksal of Sato Ki Gali) Whilst technically not an order, it essentially serves as one. The "Gyanian Bunga" was present in Amritsar for at least a century before British hegemony. It was often made up of individuals belonging to all of the above orders. The Damdami Taksal alleges connection and lineage (pranali) with the order, However, this is a topic of contention. Others refer to it as "Samparda Bhindra(n)".

== 19th century sects ==
=== Nirmala ===
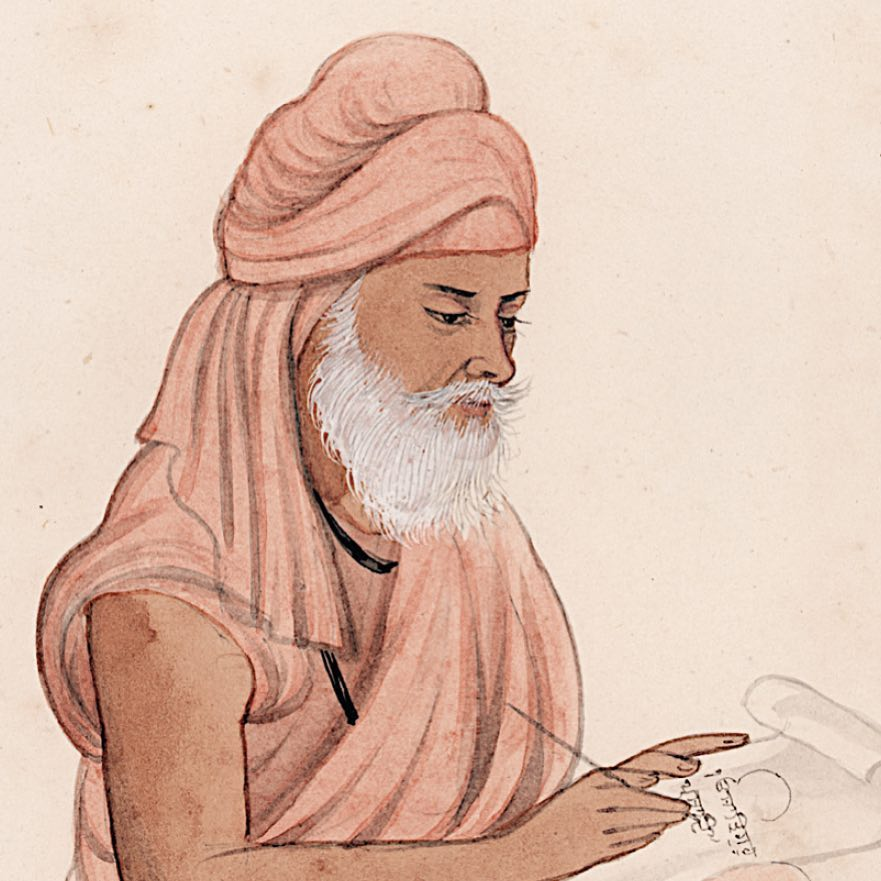
Painting of a Nirmala Sikh by Kapur Singh, Amritsar, ca.1860–65

Nirmalas are a Sikh tradition of ascetics. According to their traditional beliefs, the Nirmala Sikh tradition was founded by Guru Gobind Singh in the late 17th century when he sent five Sikhs to Varanasi (Kansi) to learn Sanskrit and Hindu religious texts. Another tradition states that they originated during the time of Guru Nanak. These beliefs, according to W. H. McLeod, are of doubtful historicity because they are "scarcely mentioned" in Sikh literature before the 19th century. Jathedar Gurbachan Singh of the Giani Samparda (Sampardai Bhindra(n) also disagreed with this claim).

The Nirmala Sikhs often wear ochre-colored robes (or at least one item), observe celibacy, and keep kesh (unshorn hair). They observe the same birth and death rituals as the Hindu ascetics and have an akhara (martial organisation) in Haridwar, and a number of deras in Punjab (India). They have been one of the major procession participants in Kumbh Melas. They were itinerant missionaries who traveled and spread Sikhism among the masses beyond Punjab, and were particularly active in Malwa within Punjab through Patiala and Phulkian state patronage during the 19th century, thus making an important contribution to the growth of Sikhism. They created many books and writings which explained some of the Sikh Scriptures, such as the famous Faridkot Teeka, which provides a complete exegesis of the Guru Granth Sahib, very similar to the Islamic tafsir. They often served as mahants in Sikh temples (Gurdwaras) during the 18th century. Nirmalas interpret Sikh literature in Vedantic terms. During the Singh Sabha Movement of the late 19th century and early 20th century, some of their doctrines met with disapproval by the Tat Khalsa faction of Sikhs, though they continued to be accepted as Sikhs, and were cordially regarded by the Sanatan faction.

=== Namdharis ===
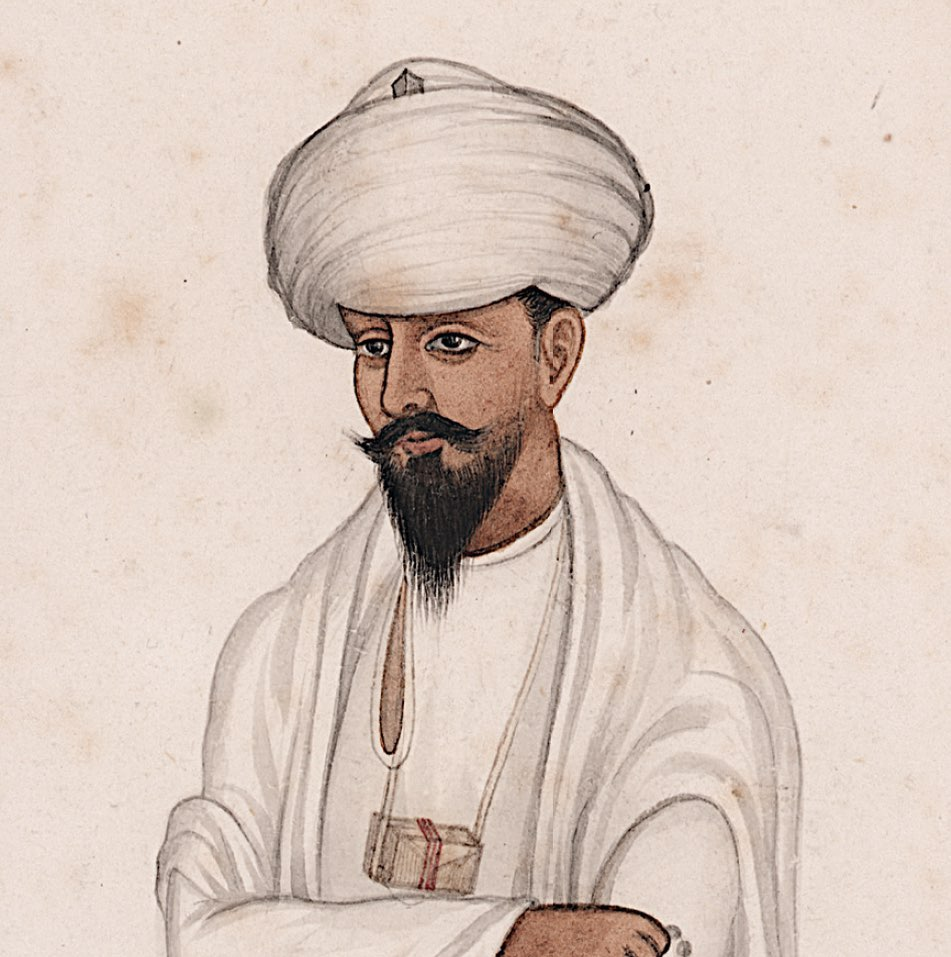
Painting of a Namdhari Sikh or Kuka Sikh, by Kapur Singh, Amritsar, ca.1860–65

Namdharis, also known as Namdhari Sikhs or Kuka Sikhs, believe that the line of Sikh Gurus did not end with Satguru Gobind Singh, as they claim that he did not die in Nanded but, instead lived-on as a recluse under the pseudonym of "Ajapal Singh". Thus, they believe in the continuation of the succession of Sikh Gurus through the centuries from Satguru Nanak Dev to the present day. They refer to their spiritual leaders as "Satguru" and that believe that Satguru Gobind Singh nominated Satguru Balak Singh to be the 11th Guru. They do not believe in any religious ritual other than the repetition of God's name (or nam, due to which the members of the sect are called Namdharis). They reject the worship of idols, graves, tombs, gods, or goddesses. The Namdharis had more of a social impact due to the fact that they emphasised Khalsa identity and the authority of the Guru Granth Sahib. They call their houses of worship dharamsalas.

Their 12th guru was Satguru Ram Singh, who moved the sect's center to Sri Bhaini Sahib (Ludhiana). Himself a Tarkhan or Ramgharia, his rural sect was largely composed of Ramgharias and poorer Jat Sikhs. They have been strictly vegetarian and a strong opponent of cattle slaughter, and retaliated against butchers for killing cows in 1871-72. Their leader Satguru Ram Singh was arrested by the British and he was exiled to Rangoon, Myanmar. Dozens of Namdharis were arrested by the British and executed in Ludhiana and Amritsar in 1871, while sixty six Namdhari Sikhs were executed without trial at Malerkotla in 1872, with a twelve-year boy hacked to death by swords and the rest sixty five executed through cannons. The colonial administration had labelled the Namdhari community as 'criminal tribe' and in 1904 remarked that "it is not possible for a Kuka to be loyal subject of the British Government..."

They consider Guru Granth Sahib and Dasam Granth as equally important, and compositions from the Chandi di Var are a part of their daily Nitnem. Like Hindus, they circumambulate the fire (havan) during their weddings, but they differ in that the hymns are those from the Adi Granth. Giani Gian Singh credits Satguru Ram Singh as being the first to have started the practice of marriage amongst Sikhs referred to as Anand Karaj, which includes recital of four laavans concluding with the recital of Anand Sahib. The Namdharis wear homespun white turbans, which they wrap around their heads (sidhi pagri). They are called Kuka, which means "crier, shouter", for their ecstatic religious practices during devotional singing. They also meditate, using mala (rosary). Some texts refer to them as Jagiasi or Abhiasi.

Harjinder Singh Dilgeer asserts that Ram Singh never claimed to be a guru and instead believed that the Guru Granth Sahib was the guru. However, Namdhari literature mentions that during the tough times of colonial persecution post-1872 Malerkotla massacre, Satguru Ram Singh bestowed Guruship to his younger brother, Satguru Hari Singh to sustain the anti-colonial movement. The Punjab District Gazetteer (Ludhiana District and Malerkotla State) 1904 mentioned the situation of Namdhari Sikhs as "It is not to be expected then that any man, unless he were prepared to break with society and give his enemies a constant hold on him, would admit that he belonged to the sect..." Despite these challenges, the Namdhari Sikhs, under the leadership of Satguru Hari Singh, continued to maintain their religious practices and their struggle for independence, albeit under much more difficult circumstances. Their later spiritual leaders Satguru Partap Singh and Satguru Jagjit Singh played a part in refugee rehabilitation post-1947 Indo-Pak partition. To bring different Sikh sects onto one platform, Satguru Partap Singh organised “Guru Nanak Sarv Sampradaya” in 1934 at Sri Bhaini Sahib. Satguru Jagjit Singh worked towards preservation of traditional Sikh devotional music styles of Gurbani Kirtan. Currently, the sect is led by Satguru Uday Singh, who has continued efforts towards inter-faith harmony for peace and brotherhood.

A large amount of the Namdhari diaspora can be found in Thailand. Tatla mentions how influential figures like Satguru Jagjit Singh "brought standards of social and religious judgement among overseas Sikh communities much closer to the Punjabi society." He mentions that some families abroad used to wait, sometimes over a year, for the visit of their spiritual leader Satguru Jagjit Singh to conduct the marriages.

=== Nirankari ===
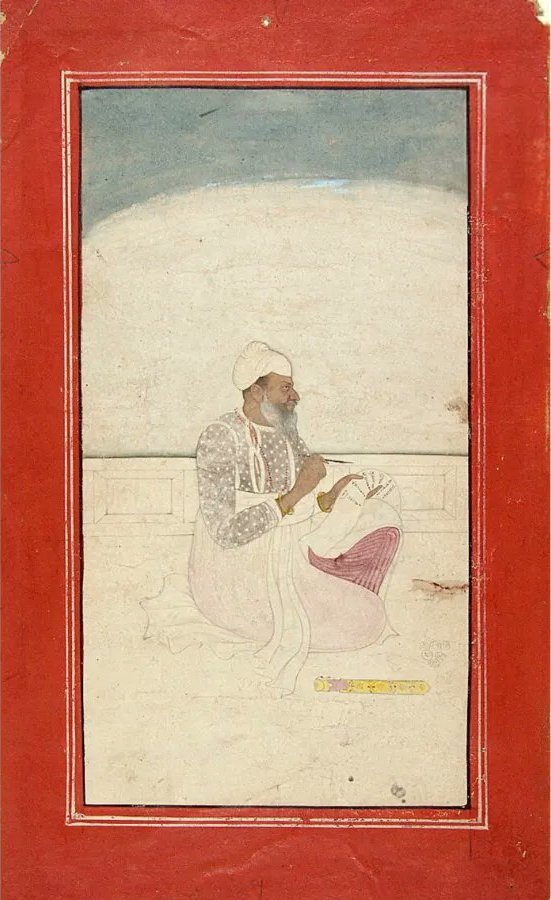
Miniature painting thought to depict Baba Dyal Singh, founder of the Nirankari sect of Sikhism in 1851, circa 19th century.

The Nirankari movement was founded by Baba Dyal Das (1783–1855), as a Sikh reform movement in northwestern Punjab around the middle of the 19th century, in the later part of Ranjit Singh's reign. Nirankari means "without form", and reflects their belief that God cannot be represented in any form and that true Sikh faith is based on nam simaran. Among the earliest Sikh reform movements, the Nirankaris condemned the growing idol worship, obeisance to living gurus and influence of Brahmanic ritual that had crept into the Sikh panth. Though not an initiated Khalsa, he urged Sikhs to return to their focus to a formless divine (nirankar) and described himself as a nirankari. Maharaja Ranjit Singh of the Sikh Empire was said to have appreciated his teachings.

Nirankari have opposed any form of ritualism in Sikhism, emphasising the need to return to the teachings of their founder Guru Nanak. They were the first sect to demand major changes in how Sikh temples are operated, the Sikh ceremonies conducted. They also disagreed with the orthodox Sikhs on only 10 Gurus and the scripture as the living Guru. Nirankaris believe that human guru to interpret the scripture and guide Sikhs is a necessity. Nirankaris are indistinguishable from other Sikhs in outward appearance, with both kesdhari ("hair-keeping") and sahajdhari ("slow-adopter") followers; their acceptance of the mainstream Sikh marriage settled the main issue dividing them from the orthodox Sikhs, leaving only their recognition of a continuing line of Gurus from Baba Dyal as the main differentiation.

There are two Nirankari groups, the Asli Nirankaris (meaning "real Nirankaris"), founded by Baba Dyal Singh, and the Nakali Nirankaris (meaning "fake Nirankaris"), a latter heretical splinter group of the original Nirankari movement.

The Sant Nirankaris are a small group which splintered from the Nirankaris in the 1940s, and is opposed by orthodox Sikhs and Nirankaris alike. They believe that scripture is open and therefore added works of their leaders into the Guru Granth Sahib. This led to increasingly conflicts with the orthodox Sikhs, with whom the Sant Nirankaris had clashed since the 1950s, with tensions increasing due to some of Gurbachan Singh's religious actions, culminating in the 1978 Sikh-Nirankari clashes and further incidents. In the late 1970s, Jarnail Singh Bhindranwale repeatedly denounced their practices. In 1980, the leader of Sant Nirankari tradition, Gurbachan Singh, was assassinated.

=== Sanatani ===
Sanatan Sikh, a term and formulation coined by Harjot Oberoi, referred to Sikhs who formed a traditionalist faction during the Singh Sabha Movement in 1873. They campaigned for a Dharmic interpretation that accepted a wide range of beliefs drawn from Hinduism. The Amritsar Singh Sabha was led by Khem Singh Bedi, Avtar Singh Vahiria and others. Sanatan Sikhs accept beliefs and practices such as the belief in the teachings of the Vedas, Puranas, and Itihasa. They also were tolerant to the use of idols and images of Sikh Gurus as well as other icons within Gurdwaras. Instead of treating scripture as the only guru, Sanatan Sikhs campaigned for acceptability of living gurus to guide those Sikhs who seek one. Amid factional rivalry, the influence of the dominant Tat Khalsa ("true Khalsa"), due to the support of the Sikh masses, resulted in the decline of Sanatan Sikhs. Today, it is a marginalised interpretation of Sikhism.

=== Nanaksari ===
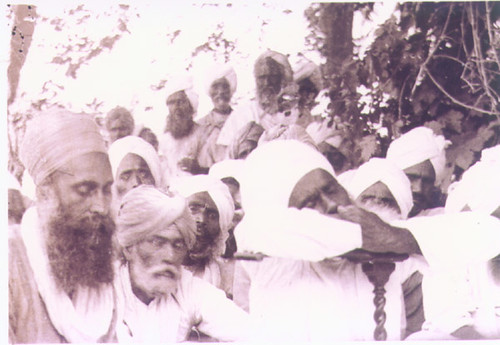
Photograph of Nand Singh (rightmost, foreground), founder of the Nanaksari sect of Sikhism, meditating with a group of his followers

The Nanaksari (or Nanaksar) sect and movement was founded by Nand Singh in Rawalpindi during the latter years of the 19th century. Most followers of the sect draw from the Ramgarhia Sikh community. The founder claims to have had a vision of Guru Nanak appearing from out of the Guru Granth Sahib while deep in meditation. They are described as a conservative group who approach the Sikh scriptures with a literalist interpretation. The movement has been categorised as semi-orthodox but not outright heretical. The sect is headed by a spiritual lingeage of sants (saints) and is prominent in rural Punjab. Followers of the sect are strict vegetarians who reject and reinterpret historical anecdotes of the Sikh Gurus hunting animals. After Nand Singh, the sect was headed by his disciple, Ishar Singh.

=== Akhand Kirtani Jatha ===
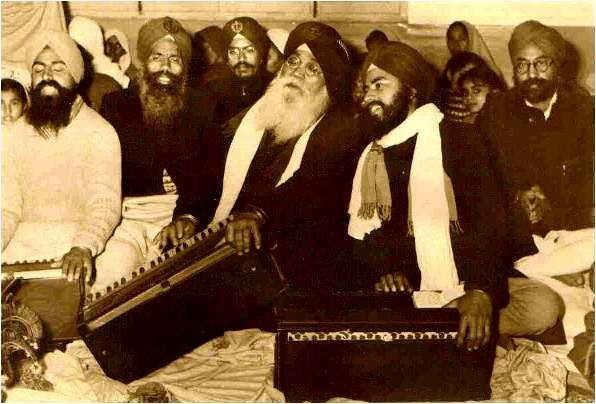
Image of Bhai Randhir Singh, the founder of the Akhand Kirtani Jatha, performing kirtan with followers

The Akhand Kirtani sect, officially known as the Akhand Kirtani Jatha (AKJ), is a sect founded by Randhir Singh and originated in the late 19th century as an anti-colonial movement. The leadership of the sect primarily draws from the Khatri caste even though the founder, Randhir Singh, was a Jat. They are regarded as a semi-orthodox sect of Sikhism, as they maintain their own rehat (code of conduct). Their interpretation of the Five Ks differ from mainstream Sikhs, they believe that what most Sikhs call Kesh refers to Keski (headpiece) rather than actual, unshorn hair as they believe the Five Ks cannot refer to parts of the physical body. They place heavy importance on the recital of gurbani (Sikh hymns), performing Akhand Paths and Sahaj Paths (non-stop recitation of the Sikh scriptures), and are renowned for their unique way of performing kirtan (devotional Sikh music). Their method of kirtan differs from other Sikh groups as they place strong emphasis on repetition, breathing techniques, and fervour whilst using comparatively recent instruments like the tabla and vaaja (harmonium) rather than traditional Sikh instruments during their rainsbai all-night long kirtan sessions. The group played an important role in 1978 Sikh–Nirankari clash, with the Babbar Khalsa being a breakaway group from the Akhand Kirtanis.

== 20th century sects ==
=== Damdami Taksal ===
Damdami Taksaal is a school which claims a direct lineage of vidya to Guru Gobind Singh (via the Gianian Samparda). It still exists today and teaches thousands of people vidya and santhiya across the globe. In 1706, after the Battle of Muktsar, the army of Guru Gobind Singh camped at Sabo Ki Talwandi. This acted as a damdamā, or halting place (lit. 'breathing place'), and is now the site of Takht Sri Damdamā Sahib. That year, Guru Gobind Singh is said to have founded a distinguished school of exegesis (Taksal), later headed up by Baba Deep Singh. Guru Gobind Singh reestablished the famous Anandpur Darbar of learning in Damdamā Sahib, as now this new location was considered to be the highest seat of learning for the Sikhs during the 18th century. Modern Damdami Taksal (Jatha Bhindran-Mehta) claims direct historical ties to Guru Gobind Singh, who entrusted them with the responsibility of teaching the analysis (vichār/vidya) and recitation of the Sikh scriptures (santhya). The word ṭaksāl (lit. 'mint') refers to an education institute; which is a community of students who associate themselves with a particular sant (lit. 'spiritual leader' or 'saint').

The center of the present-day Damdami Taksal (Jatha Bhindran-Mehta) is Gurdwārā Gurdarshan Parkāsh in Mehta, Amritsar district. People debate whether or not the current Taksal can trace its lineage back to the first Jathedar (general), Baba Deep Singh. During the time of the British Raj over India, Damdami Taksal went into hiding and as such, official records and lineages are difficult to pinpoint.

Damdami Taksal (Jatha Bhindran-Mehta) achieved prominence in the 20th century again through its second incumbent, Gurbachan Singh Khalsa (1902–1969) of Bhindran Kalan, hence its name. He devoted his entire life to teaching the meaning (vidya) and pronunciation (santhiya) of the Sikh scriptures. He trained a large number of gianīs (traditional Sikh scholars) through his mobile seminary. When he died in 1969, he was succeeded by two contenders, Giani Mohan Singh (1919–2020), leading the original in Ludhiana, and Sant Kartar Singh (1932–1977), leading from Mehtā in Amritsar district. Gurbachan Singh chose Kartar Singh, but his family decided on the older Giani Mohan Singh. The Taksal also has a history of dispute with the Indian government, as Kartar Singh had been a severe critic of the excesses of Indira Gandhi's Emergency. Jarnail Singh Bhindranwale was the last Jathedar (president) of Damdami Taksal (Jatha Bhindran-Mehta). Jarnail Singh Bhindranwale was a famous religious scholar who led this order of Sikhs, and also became a renowned militant who got into conflict with the Indian Government.

=== Neeldhari ===
The Neeldharis were founded by Harnam Singh (1877–1980) and is headquartered at Naushehra Majha Singh, a locality located on the Amritsar-Pathankot Road. (Note: The Neeldhari sect is known as 'Neeldhari Sant Khalsa' and 'Dera Sant Maharaj Harnam Singh'. Harnam Singh is popularly known as 'Sant Baijnath Wale'.) They believe in the concept of living gurus (known as dehdhari) succeeding the mainstream Sikh gurus. They do not follow the mainstream Sikh maryada. The Neeldharis are named after their dress-code worn by both men and women, which mandates that they wear blue-and-white-coloured garbs known as neela-bana, consisting of a white kurta-pyjama, a blue scarf called a chakuta (substitute for a white turban), and a blue waistband known as a kamarkassa. Furthermore, followers of the sect keep a small stick called a saila, an iron vessel referred to as a gadva, and they also keep a rosary. Orthodox Neeldhari Sikhs wear wooden footwear known as khadawan.

The title of the Neeldhari maryada (code of conduct) is Ath Rahit Maryada Guru Ji Ki. The maryada seems to point to the fact that the Neeldharis replaced the position of Namdhari Guru Ram Singh with their own Harnam Singh. In the Neeldhari maryada, many similarities can be linked to the Namdhari code of conduct, such as rising early in the morning, removing kamarkasa, urinating or defecating, brushing, bathing, and changing their bana (clothes). They use a white towel or scarf to dry themselves. Their nitnem shares much in common with the mainstream Sikh nitnem, however they are also recommended to recite banis such as the Asa-di-Var, Akal Ustat, Chandi-di-Var, Ugardhanti, Bara Maha Majh Mahala Panjvan, and the Bara Maha Tukhari as additional banis to recite daily. Furthermore, Neeldharis are requested to mutter the word Wah (acclaiment of the wonderous God) continuously throughout their day. The Neeldhari maryada abandons the kirpan, kara, and dastar, which differs it considerably from both the mainstream Sikh maryada and Namdhari maryada.

=== 3HO ===
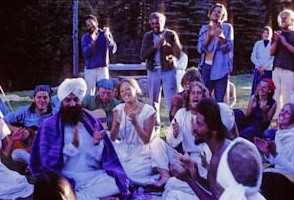
Yogi Bhajan and some early students chanting together at the 3HO Summer Solstice gathering of 1970

The 3HO sect (abbreviation for 'Healthy, Happy, Holy Organization') is a western group that emerged in 1971, founded by Harbhajan Singh, popularly known as Yogi Bhajan. It requires both men and women to wear turbans, adopt the surname Khalsa, and wear all-white attire. They also call themselves the "Sikh Dharma movement" and "Khalsa Dharma movement" and are often called Gora (meaning "white person", though not all White Sikhs follow 3HO) Sikhs and Bhajanists by the mainstream adherents of Sikhism. Their name 3HO, stands for Healthy Happy Holy Organization. This Sikh sect emphasises meditation and Yoga. The sect started and grew a number of international business brands such as Yogi Tea. 3HO's relations with the orthodox Khalsa are quite mixed. The 3HO sect has a strict rahit, the code of conduct expectation. Another characteristic of the sect is that they allow baptised Sikh women to form the Panj Pyare. The sect numbered around 5,000 in the early 1990s.

=== Kala Afghana ===
A term used to refer to Gurbakhsh Singh, a resident of the locality of Kala Afghana, and his followers. (Note: Often grouped with wider "Missionary" theology, representative of reformist scholasticism) The group challenged many long-standing beliefs and practices of Sikhism, creating enemies with traditionalist and conservative sectors of Sikhs as a result. They claimed to be purists of the Guru Granth Sahib and rejected many aspects of contemporary Sikhism as being "Brahminical" innovations. They are staunchly against the Dasam Granth. Its founder was ex-communicated by the Akal Takht in 2003.

== Split traditions ==
This section deals with split traditions or former Sikh sects which no-longer self-identify as such. Two contemporary Indian religions, Ravidassia and Bhaniara Dera, began as sects of the Sikh religion, but no longer identify as part of Sikhism. In both cases, their separation from Sikhism was marked by the adoption of a new religious scripture to replace the Guru Granth Sahib.

=== Gulabdasia ===
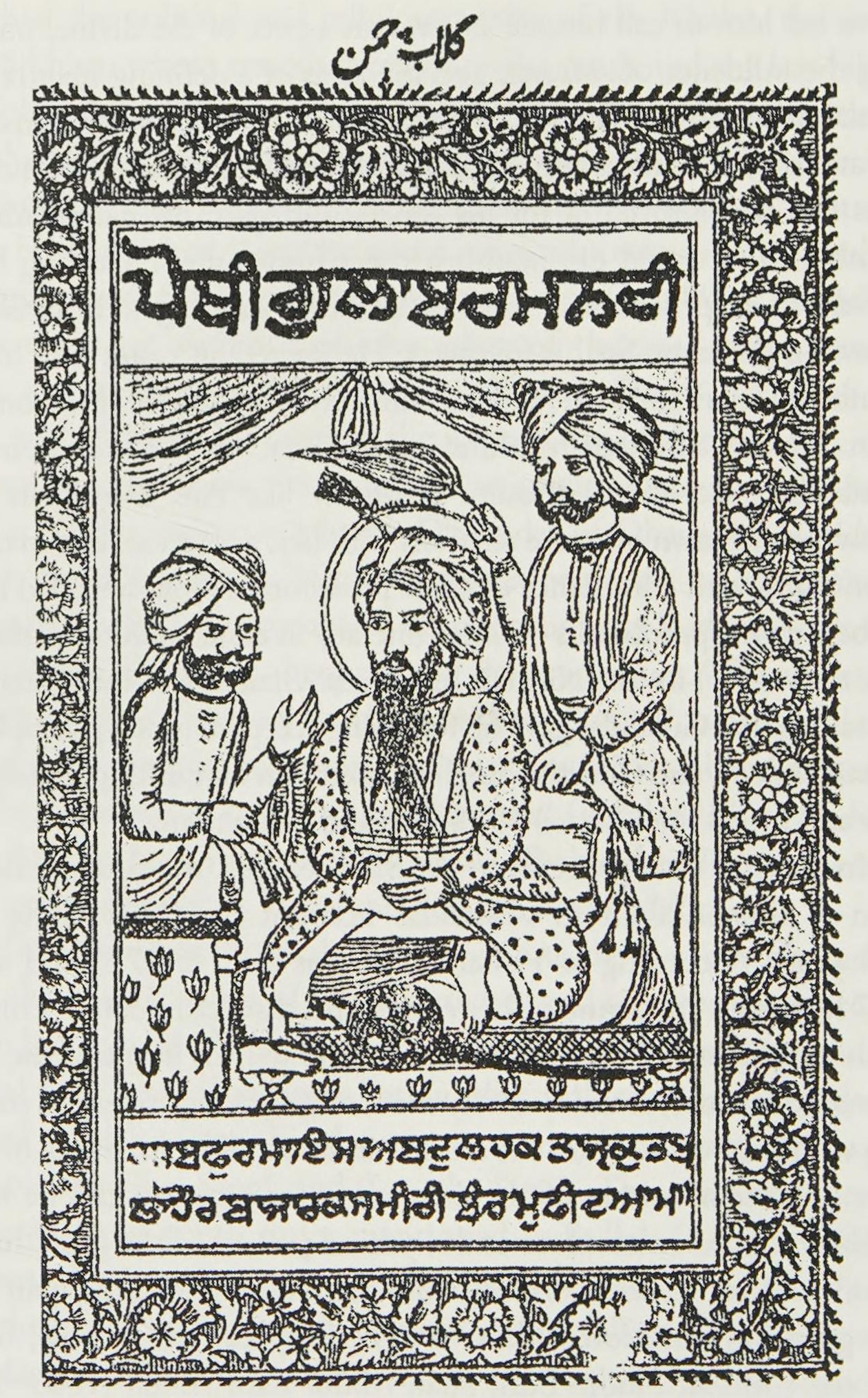
Depiction of a nimbate Gulabdas, founder of the Gulabdasia sect, flanked on both sides by attendants and/or devotees, from the title page of his book 'Gulab Chaman', published by Abdul Haq, Lahore, 1881

The Gulabdasia sect (or dera) was founded in the 19th century by Gulab Das (born as Gulab Singh), whom was born in 1809 into a Jat Sikh family to a father named Hamira in the village of Rataul in Tarn Taran district. (Note: The name of the sect is also referred to as "Gulabdasi".) He served in the Sikh Khalsa Army as a trooper during the time of Maharaja Sher Singh. Gulab Das learnt Vedantic knowledge from Nirmalas. When the Sikh Empire was deposed, he became a disciple of an Udasi saint named Pritam Das. His published works include Updes Bilas and Pothi Gulab Chaman Di, these works lay out their unique ideology and practices of the sect. The sect promoted an epicurean lifestyle and rejected ritualism. They did not believe in pilgrimages, religious ceremonies, or reverence of proclaimed holy men. They believed that mankind and the divine were of the same essence, and that mankind would eventually be absorbed into the divine. They believed only that pleasure and sensual gratification was worth aspiring towards. The followers of the sect wore expensive clothing and lived a life of unrestrained indulgence in all different kinds of ways. They detested lies. Many wore white garbs, others dressed as Udasis, yet more dressed up like Nirmalas, and some liked to be clean-shaven. Piro Preman, an ex-Muslim and first female poet of the Punjabi-language, was associated with the sect. The sect was unorthodox, influenced by the Bhakti movement and Sufism in regards to devotion, and criticised caste divisions and discrimination occurring at the time in society. Most of its followers drew from the Dalit community. The sect was headquartered in Chathianwala, near Lahore, and was established sometime during the reign of Maharaja Ranjit Singh during the Sikh Empire. Another source lists its pre-partition headquarters as the village Chatthe, near Kasur. It was part of the North Indian panth and sant mat movements at the time. Guru Gulab Das died in 1873 and Piro Preman inherited the sainthood. Giani Ditt Singh was associated with the sect in his early life as a preacher, where he was known as Sant Ditta Ram, before he was adopted into mainstream Sikhism. Jawahir Singh Kapur also was associated with this sect in his early years. The sect never had a large amount of followers and its numbers dwindled when Patiala State banned their entry due to their sexually expressive and liberal acts, which went against the mainstream social norm. The Gulabdasias numbered 763 in the 1891 census. The sect was most prevalent in the late 19th century but is likely extinct at present.

=== Radha Soami ===
Some of the Radhasoami movement, a contemporary Sant Mat tradition, have linked Guru Gobind Singh, and therefore the lineage of Sikh gurus, to Tulsi Sahib of Hathras by claiming that Guru Gobind Singh passed on leadership to a supposed individual named Ratnagar Rao, who then passed on the mastership to Tulsi Sahib of Hathras. However, there is no evidence that Ratnagar Rao actually existed and this claim first arose with Kirpal Singh, possibly as an effort to link the Radhasoami movement to the lineage and teachings of Sikhism.

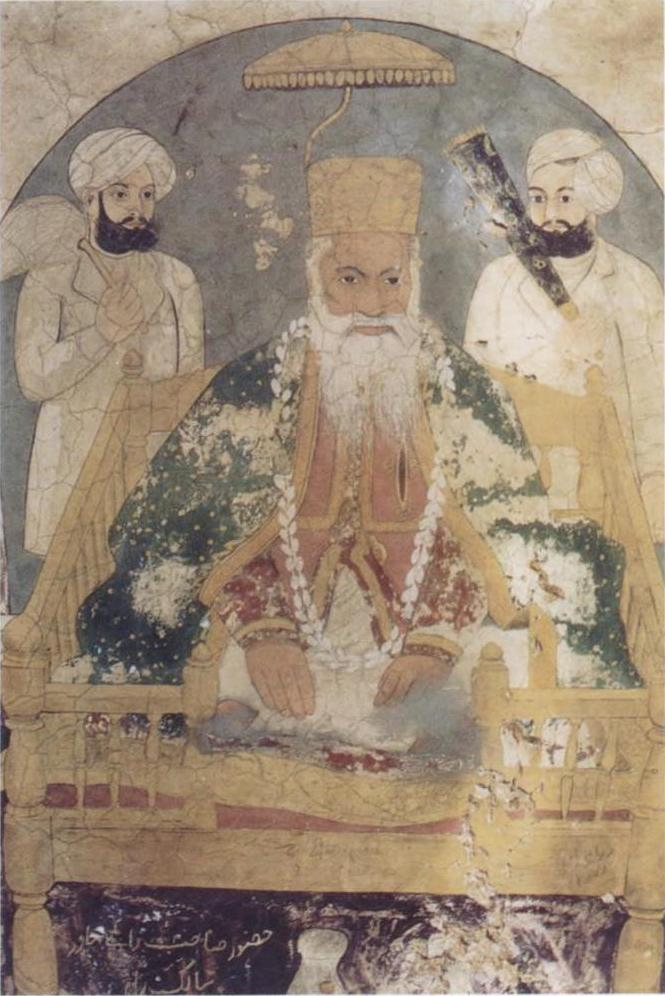
Mural of Salig Ram, also known as Huzur Maharaj, the second leader of the Radha Soami movement (Hazoor Saheb Rai Bahadur Saleg Ram). The mural is located at the Guru Ram Rai Darbar Sahib complex at Dehradun, Uttarakhand, India.

The meaning of Radha Soami is 'lord of the soul'. This movement was started by Shiv Dayal Singh (also known as Soamiji) in 1861, follower of Guru Nanak and Tulsi Sahib of Hathras. The Radhasoamis are like sect of Sikhism, as it does have connections with Sikhism, and the teachings of their founder were based, in part, on those of the founder of Sikhism, Guru Nanak and those who followed. They consider themselves a separate religion. Many recite verses from the Adi Granth during their worship, though few would call themselves a Sikh sect, as there are no ties between it and orthodox Sikh organisations, and most Sikhs would also regard the idea of Radhasoami as separate from their own. However, they are also different from the Sikhs because they have present-day Gurus, and do not follow the Khalsa dress code.

The Radhasoamis are a religious fellowship that accepts saints and living gurus from anywhere. According to its founder, "image worship, pilgrimages or idol worship" is a "waste of time," "ceremonies and religious rituals are a conceit," and all traditional religious technicians, "the Rishis, Yogis, Brahmans, and Sannyasins," have "failed," while its leaders, while believing in karma, have been emphatic in rejecting other often cardinal Hindu beliefs and in their suspicion of institutions, leading a 19th-century leader to assert its independent basis from Hinduism "or any other religion," often choosing to avoid the word "religion" altogether, with a leader describing it as "no religion at all," but an amalgamation of "the teachings of ... all saints of the world." It has attracted a large number of Dalits, and in the diaspora have attracted may members of other ethnic groups for which the satsang is conducted in English.

Like the writings of Sikh gurus, Shiv Dayal used the epithet satnam for the divine. The Radhasoamis do not install the any other scriptures in their sanctum. Instead, the guru sits in the sanctum while conducting the satsang and they listen to explanation of sayings of various saints, from the Adi Granth or the living guru, as well as sing hymns together. The Radha Soamis are strict vegetarians like some Sikhs. They are active in charitable work such as providing free medical services and help to the needy.

=== Ravidassia ===
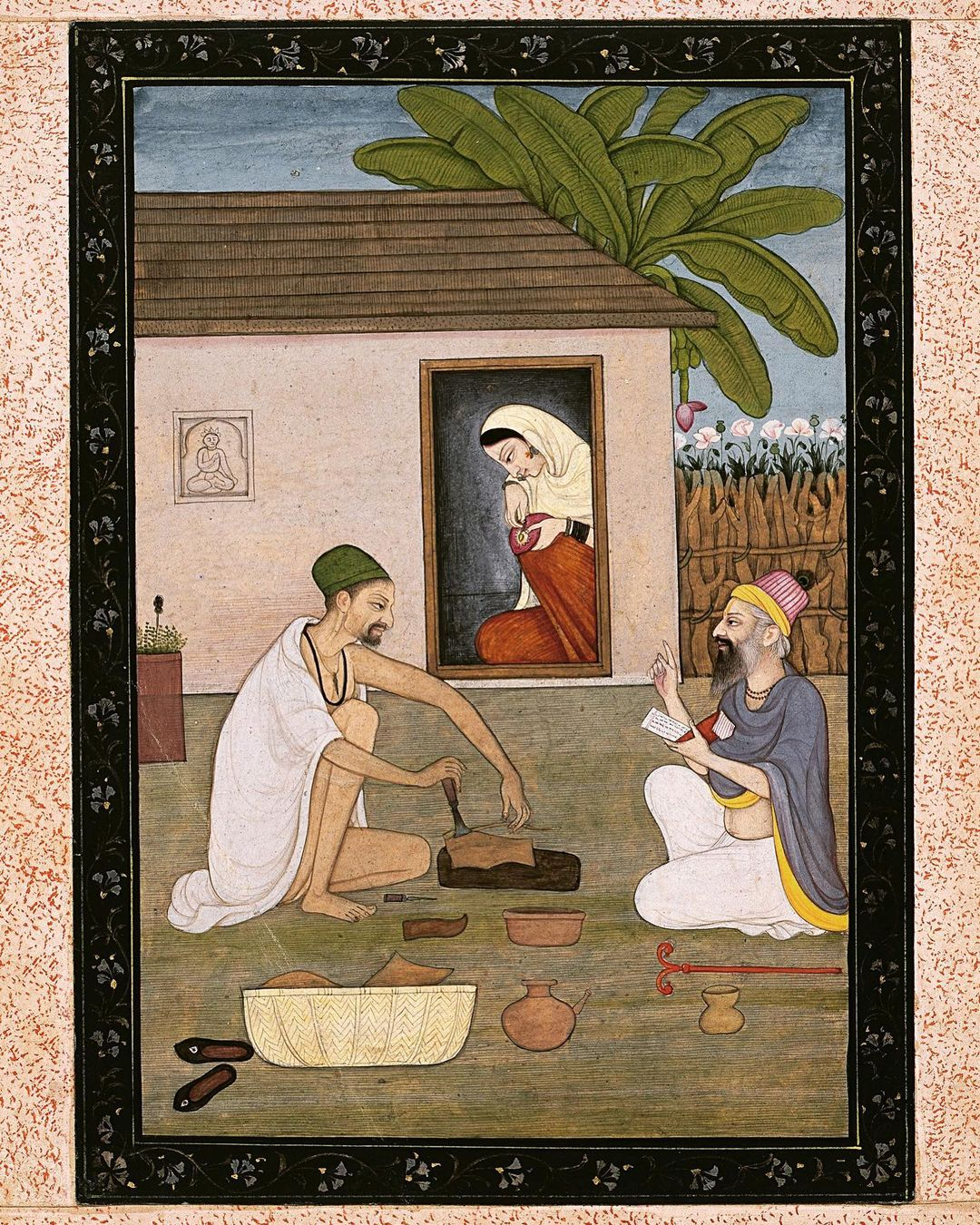
Bhagat Ravidas at work as a shoemaker. Folio from a series featuring Bhakti saints. Master of the first generation after Manaku and Nainsukh of Guler, Pahari region, ca.1800–1810

The Ravidasi Panth used to be a part of Sikhism. In 2009, the sect left Sikhism and gained recognition as a separate religion. It is based on the teachings of the 14th century Indian guru Ravidas, revered as a satguru. The movement had attracted Dalits (formerly marginalised), and they felt that they were a victim of social discrimination and violence from government Sikhs.

Historically, Ravidassia represented a range of beliefs in the Indian subcontinent, with some devotees of Ravidass counting themselves as Ravidassia Sikhs, but first formed in the early 20th century in colonial British India. The Ravidassia community began to take on more cohesion following 1947 and the establishment of successful Ravidassia communities in the diaspora.

Ravidassias, states Ronki Ram, accept contemporary living sants of Ravidass Deras as Guru whereas the Sikhs do not. In 2009, several Sikhs attacked the leader of Dera Sach Khand (Dera Bhallan), his deputy and his followers at a Ravidassia Gurdwara (temple) in Vienna. This assassination attempt injured many and killed the deputy, Ramanand Dass. This triggered the Ravidasi Sikhs to leave Sikhism and become an independent religion fully separated from Sikhism.

Prior to their break from Sikhism, the Dera Bhallan revered and recited the Guru Granth Sahib of Sikhism in Dera Bhallan. However, following their split from mainstream Sikhism, the Dera Bhallan compiled their own holy book based exclusively on Ravidas's teachings, the Amritbani Guru Ravidass Ji, and these Dera Bhallan Ravidassia temples now use this book in place of the Guru Granth Sahib.

=== Bhaniara Dera ===
A breakaway sect founded by Piara Singh Bhaniara, who claimed to be an incarnation of Guru Gobind Singh, in the 1980s based in Dhamiana village in Rupnagar district. Most of its followers drew from the Dalit community, known as Mazhabi Sikhs. In 2001, a scripture was published by the group named Bhavsagar Samunder Amrit Vani Granth (commonly shortened to simply Bhavsagar Granth), which was later banned by the Government of Punjab for hurting the religious feelings of Sikhs.

== See also ==
- Dera (organisation)
- Guru-shishya parampara
- Sampradaya
- Sant Mat
- Contemporary Sant Mat movements
- Bhakti movement
- Panth
- Gaddi Nashin
- Sanatan Sikh
- Kabir panth

== Sources ==
- Oberoi, Harjot (1994). The Construction of Religious Boundaries: Culture, Identity, and Diversity in the Sikh Tradition. University of Chicago Press. ISBN 978-0-226-61593-6.
