= Tat Khalsa =

Sikh faction

Tat Khalsa ਤੱਤ ਖਾਲਸਾ
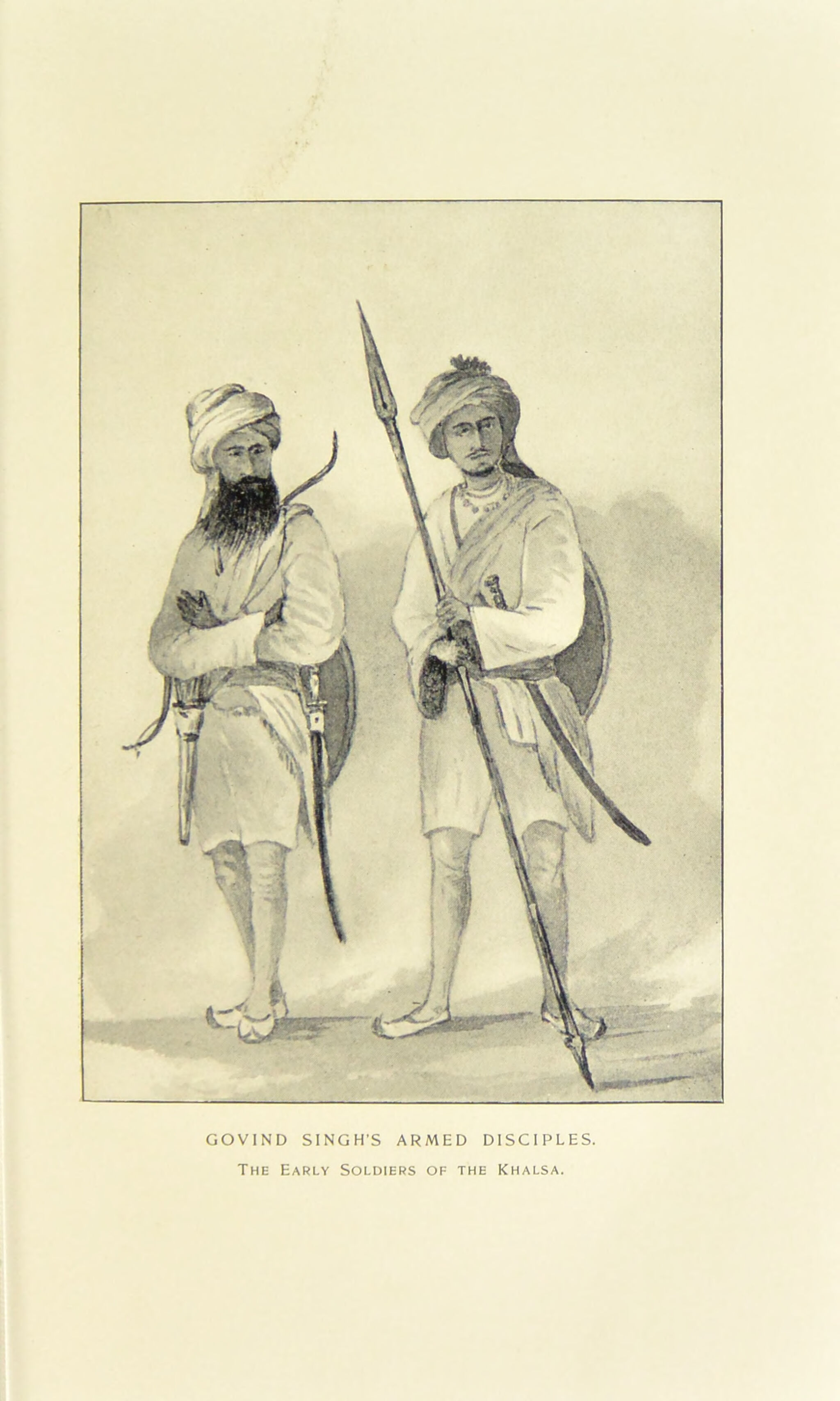
- Illustration titled 'Guru Govind Singh’s armed disciples, the early soldiers of the Khalsa' from The Sikhs (1904) by John James Hood Gordon

Founder
- Guru Gobind Singh

Regions with significant populations
- Punjab

Religions
- Sikhism

Scriptures
- Guru Granth Sahib • Dasam Granth • Sarbloh Granth

Languages
- Punjabi • Khalsa bole

The Tatt Khālsā (Gurmukhi: ਤੱਤ ਖਾਲਸਾ, romanized: tatta khālasā, lit. 'true Khalsa'), also romanised as Tatt Khalsa, known as the Akal Purkhias during the 18th century, was a Sikh faction that arose from the schism following the passing of Guru Gobind Singh in 1708, led by his widow Mata Sundari, opposed to the religious innovations of Banda Singh Bahadur and his followers. The roots of the Tat Khalsa lies in the official formalisation and sanctification of the Khalsa order by the tenth Guru in 1699. Rattan Singh Bhangu uses the term Tatt Sar Khalsa to describe the faction, with it being opposed to the Bandai Khalsa. Usage of the term was revived during the Singh Sabha movement.

== Etymology and meaning ==
The word ਤੱਤ tatt has been translated as "ready," "pure," or "true;" the terms tatt and ਸਾਰ sār have also been translated as "essence". The name has been translated as meaning "real Khalsa" or "pure Khalsa". Originally referring to a historical faction of the Sikhs, the word is also used to describe a devout and activist Sikhs (as opposed to ḍhillaṛ Sikhs), especially used in this manner during the Singh Sabha movement.

== History ==
=== Origin ===
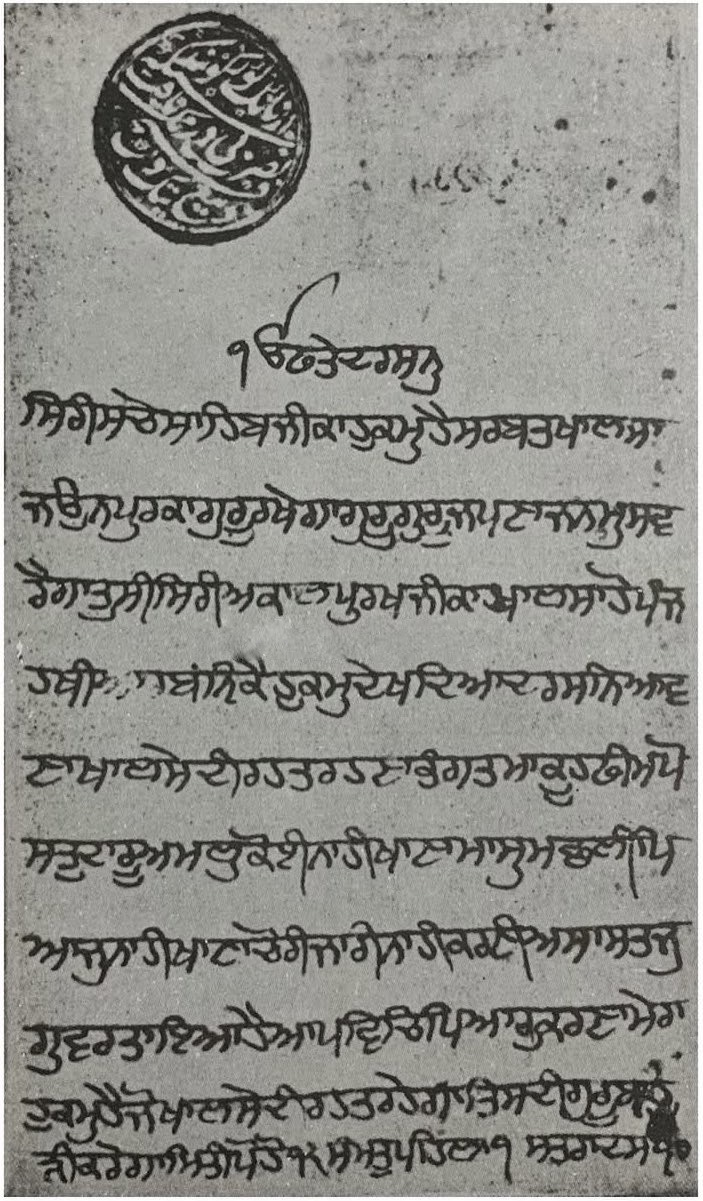
Hukamnama of Banda Singh Bahadur requesting Sikhs to be vegetarians, sent to the sangat (congregation) of Jaunpur, dated 12 Poh 1769 Bk. (12 December 1710

Banda Singh Bahadur, in the flush of an initial string of victories against the Mughal governor of Sirhind, made changes to the Khalsa tradition that were opposed by the orthodox Khalsa as heretical. These included requiring his followers to be vegetarian, replacing the traditional Khalsa garment color of blue with red garments, replacing the traditional Khalsa salute of "Waheguru Ji ka Khalsa, Waheguru Ji ki Fateh" with the salute "Fateh Darshan" and most controversial to the Sikhs, allowing his followers to treat him as a guru, in direct contradiction to the precept of Guru Maneyo Granth laid out by Guru Gobind Singh before his passing.

After the last defensive battle against the Mughal Army, many prominent Sikh veterans, including Binod Singh (a direct descendant of Guru Angad) and his son Kahn Singh, along with much of the Khalsa, parted ways with Banda Singh due to these changes in October 1714; the Sikhs loyal to Guru Gobind Singh were referred to as the Tatt Khalsa; those who accepted the changes were called Bandai Sikhs.

Binod Singh and his son had been deputed by Guru Gobind Singh as part of Banda Singh's advisory panj piāre. Binod Singh had been devoted to Guru Gobind Singh, following him from Delhi to Nanded. A constant ally to Banda Singh on his expedition, Binod Singh had been entrusted with Karnal district after Banda Singh's conquest of Sirhind, where he had commanded the left wing of Banda Singh's army. After falling out with Banda Singh due to his changes to the Khalsa, and still commanding 10,000 of the 15,000 men who had parted, he remained at Amritsar, where he had been induced to accompany the Mughal army. Torn between wanting to remain loyal to the Khalsa under Mata Sundari, and not wanting to fight Banda Singh, he attempted to retire without fighting at Gurdas Nangal. Upon moving away with his army, he was set upon by Mughal forces; he and 3,000-4,000 of his men were killed in the ensuing attack. The schism persisted after Banda Singh's torture and execution at Delhi in 1716, following his own capture at Gurdas Nangal.

After the assassination of the Mughal emperor Farrukh Siyar in 1719, Sikh persecution lessened enough to allow for occasional general meetings at Amritsar, where the Bandai faction demanded 50% of the income from donations and offerings at the Darbar Sahib, which the Tatt Khalsa refused as baseless. Mata Sundari, in Delhi upon hearing of the rising tensions, dispatched Bhai Mani Singh with six other Sikhs to manage the Darbar Sahib, with the instruction that the entire income of the gurdwara go to Guru ka Langar. On Vaisakhi 1721, the Bandai faction fortified their camp in preparation for conflict, though both factions agreed to mediation offered by Mani Singh, agreeing to the determination of the site: Two slips of paper, each with one of the factions' salutes written on them, were dropped in the sarovar, or pool surrounding the gurdwara; the traditional Khalsa salute surfaced first, and many Bandais immediately bowed and came to the Khalsa side, though some objected to the validity of the mediation. A wrestling match in front of the Akal Takht between representatives of each faction was then agreed to, with Tatt Khalsa represented by Miri Singh, son of the Khalsa leader Kahn Singh, and Sangat Singh, the son of the Bandai leader Lahaura Singh. After Miri Singh's victory, and that of the Tatt Khalsa, the bulk of remaining Bandais joined the Khalsa side, and the few remaining holdouts were driven away, ending the schism.

Leading the holdouts, Mahant Amar Singh of the Bandais was seated centrally on a gaddi, or head seat, atop a cart at the Bandai camp. As tensions between the Bandais and the Tatt Khalsa escalated from words to swords, the Sikhs set upon Amar Singh's position, to find that he had fled before their arrival. Of the remaining Bandais who were surrounded, those who accepted the Sikh position set down their weapons and were reinitiated, while those who resisted were dispatched or fled the conflict. Bhai Mani Singh was seated on Amar Singh's abandoned gaddi; he made a strong plea to end the fighting. Among the thousands who rejoined the Tatt Khalsa, notables included Nanu Singh Dhesianwala, Lahaura Singh, Kashera Singh, Sham Singh Kalal, Bakhshish Singh Chamiarawala, and both sons of Bhai Bhagtu.

==== Foundation of power ====
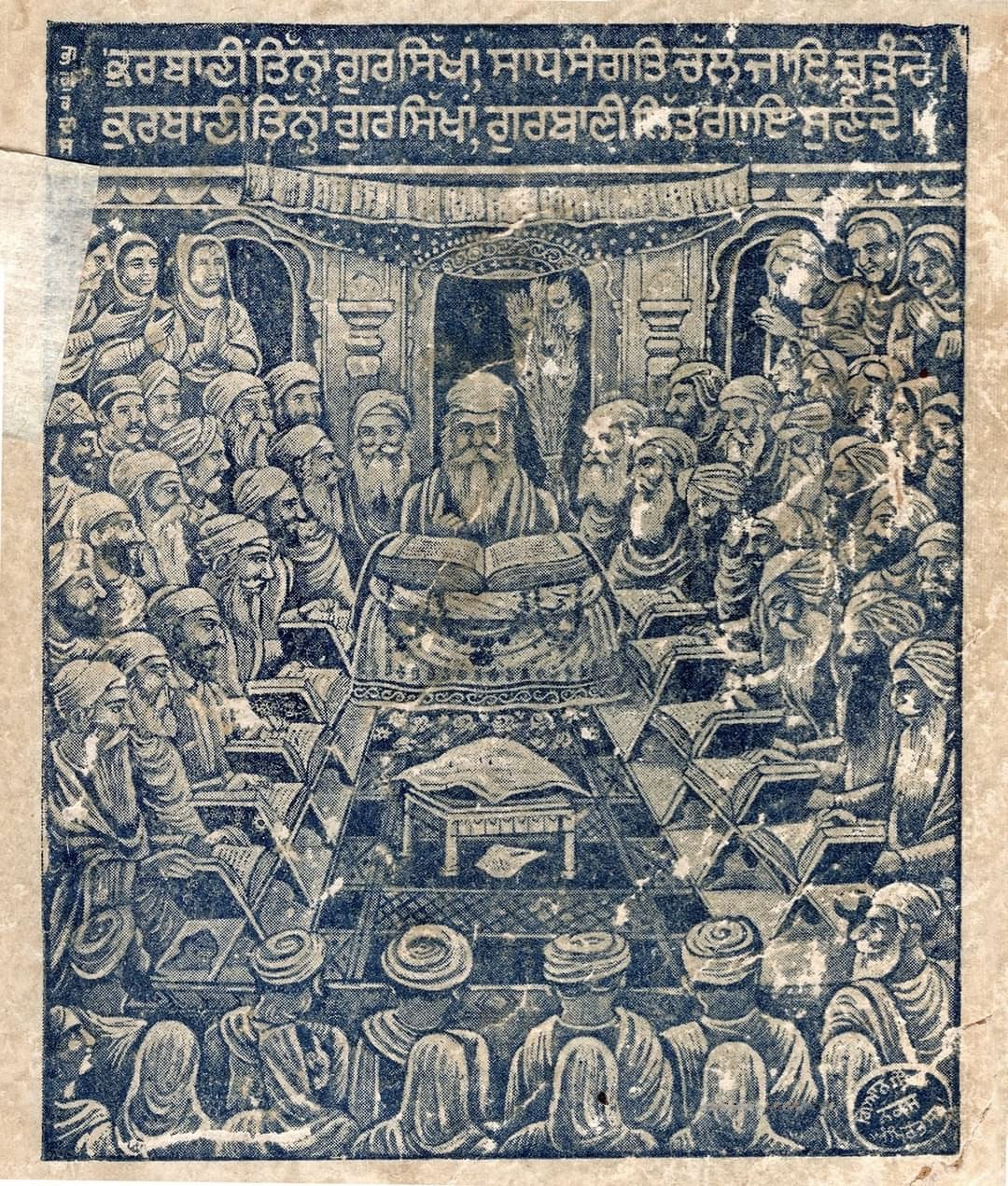
Bhai Mani Singh performing santhiya at Amritsar

After the eviction of the Bandais from Amritsar during the time of Abdus Samad Khan, the Tat Khalsa took control of it and established it as their centre, appointing Bhai Mani Singh, Guru Gobind Singh's lifelong companion and oldest disciple, as the custodian of the Darbar Sahib. The city of Amritsar again became the most important centre of Sikh pilgrimage. Upholding the doctrine of the end of personal Guruship after Guru Gobind Singh against claimants from older factions, the Tat Khalsa also opposed newer Sikh contenders to guruship, such as Gulab Rai, a grandson of Guru Hargobind, and Kharak Singh of the Gangushahis, who descended from a prominent follower of Guru Amar Das.

While most Sikhs lived as civilians in the Mughal Empire after Banda Singh's rebellion, returning to their occupations or relinquishing arms in exchange for concession of land revenue, the Tat Khalsa core continued their rebellion against the Mughal authority in the form of guerilla warfare in the less-accessible tracts, targeting government officials and their supporters. Tat Khalsa numbers and strength grew into the 1730s, prompting a conciliatory gesture from Zakariya Khan in the form of the conferment of the title of nawāb and a jagīr onto their leader, Nawab Kapur Singh. This would earn peace for a period, as the Tat Khalsa continued to strengthen, and Nawab Kapur Singh organized the growing numbers into ḍerās, delegating the work of the langar, treasury, stores, arsenal and horse granary meritocratically. The growing numbers could not be contained however, and many took to plunder and confrontation with government officials, prompting repression from Zakariya Khan, as the Sikhs took to life in roving warbands. Failing to quell Sikh rebels, Zakariya Khan instead levied tribute on Mani Singh in exchange for permitting them to visit their rallying point Amritsar on Diwali. The Sikhs, suspicious of a ruse, came but did not stay. The tribute was not sent, for which Mani Singh was martyred in Lahore. This too did not deter the Tat Khalsa from continuing to attack the Mughal administration or plundering the rear of the invading army of Nadir Shah, who was warned of the potential threat to his rule from the Sikhs by Zakariya Khan. Sukha Singh and Mehtab Singh would avenge the subsequent occupation and defilement of the Darbar Sahib by Massa Ranghar, the faujdar of Zakariya Khan who would set up a permanent post in Amritsar as he increased Sikh persecution in the 1740s, aided by local zamindars.

Amidst this tumult, which would include ghallugharas of the century, and the occupations of Ahmad Shah Abdali, his faujdars, and the Marathas, bands of Sikhs were first able to establish themselves, assert power, and issue orders to officials beginning in the Bari Doab in 1750, and striking coins and asserting their sovereignty by 1765. By this time, Qazi Nur Muhammad who had accompanied Ahmad Shah Abdali, wrote that the Sikhs had divided up among themselves and ruled the country from Sarhind to Derajat, enjoying it "without fear from anyone." Sikh bands would levy relatively light rākhī (a fifth of produce) on cultivators to protect against outsiders, with their system becoming more popular as they grew more effective, and the limited resources were pooled. The ḍerās had evolved by family ties and other factors into the misls, which would coalesce into the self-governing dal khālsā, laying the basis for the Sikh Empire.

=== Singh Sabha ===
Later, the name would be used by the dominant Singh Sabha faction in Lahore founded in 1879 to rival the Amritsar Singh Sabha. The name was used to connote Sikhs with full readiness and commitment to action on behalf of the Sikh community, in contrast to ḍhillaṛ, or "indolent, passive, ineffectual" Sikhs. Two figures connected to the 19th century Tat Khalsa are Bhai Gurmukh Singh and Bhai Kahn Singh of Nabha.

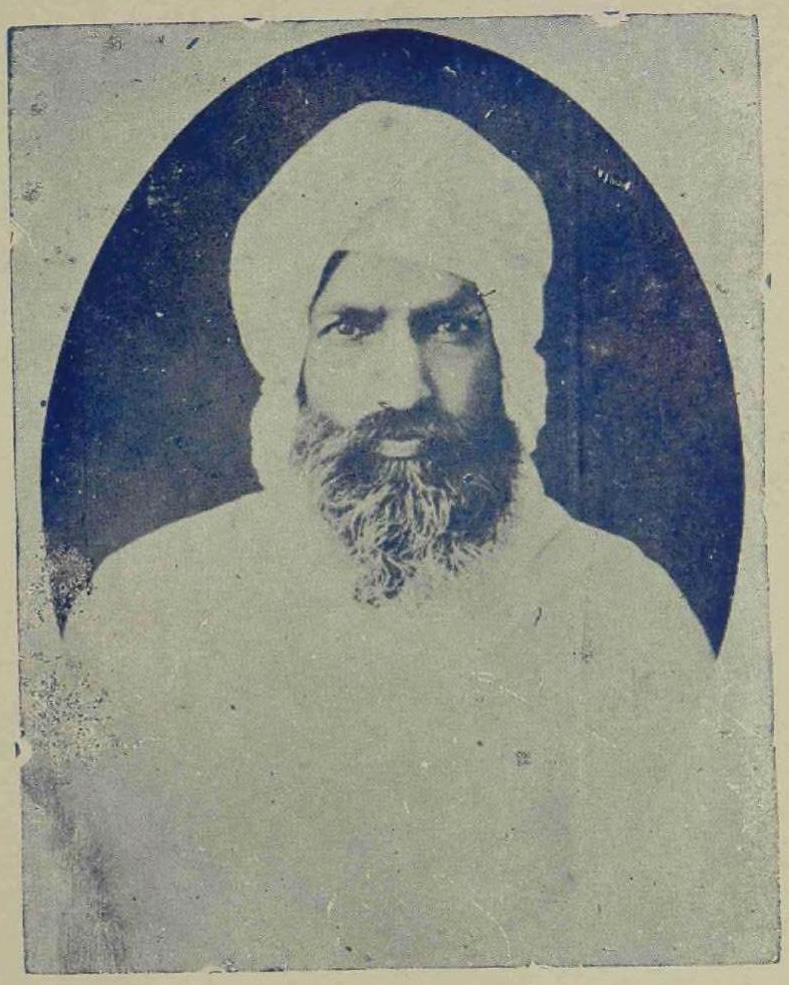
Portrait of Professor Gurmukh Singh, founder of the Lahore Singh Sabha

The leader of the Tat Khalsa Singh Sabha was Gurmukh Singh, a professor at the Oriental College of Lahore. He contacted Kahn Singh Nabha, a notable scholar, who wrote the Mahan Kosh (Encyclopedia of Sikhism) and Ham Hindu Nahin (We are not Hindus). Bhai Gurmukh Singh and Kahn Singh Nabha later mentored Max Arthur Macauliffe, a divisional judge, to undertake the translation of Granth Sahib (finished in 1909). The Tat Khalsa faction rejected the Dasam Granth as an authentic scripture of the tenth guru, with the Sanatan Sikhs supporting the scripture.

=== Khalistan movement ===
Avtar Singh Brahma founded a Khalistani militant outfit named Tat Khalsa in the 1980s.

== See also ==
- Khalsa Akhbar Lahore
- Sects of Sikhism

== Literature ==
- Oberoi, Harjot, The Construction of Religious Boundaries. Culture, Identity and Diversity in the Sikh Tradition, New Delhi 1994.
