= Grist marg =

Sikh concept of a householder lifestyle

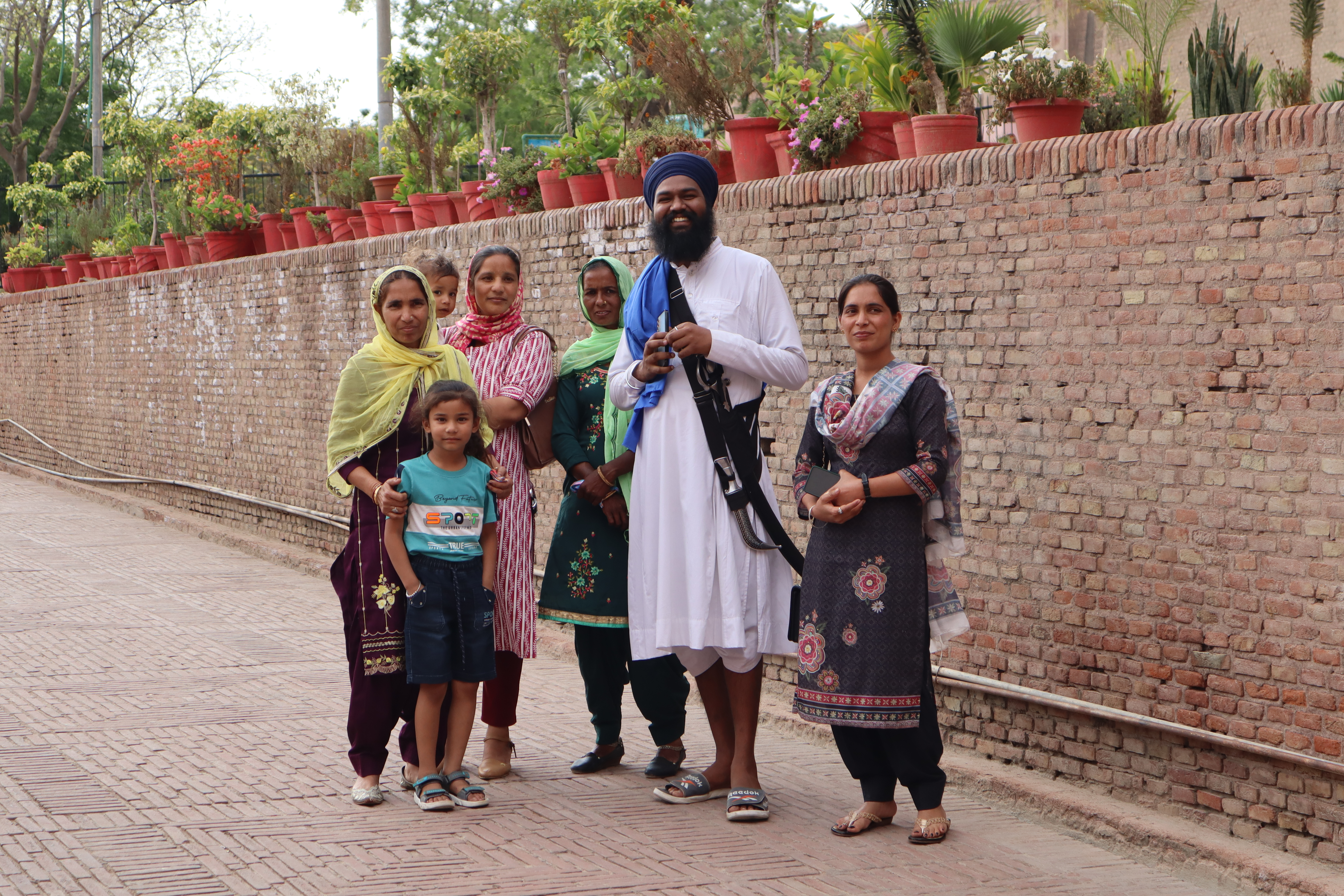
Photograph of a Sikh family within Bathinda Fort, Bathinda district, Punjab, India, April 2023

Grist marg (Gurmukhi: ਗ੍ਰਿਹਸਤ ਮਾਰਗ), also known as Grihast Jeevan, refers to the spiritual path of a householder or family lifestyle, believed to be the greatest of all pathways in Sikhism. It consists of living devoted to God while being part of a family, earning one's means honestly, serving others, and fulfilling temporal responsibilities. Such persons are able to live an earnest life despite being surrounded by worldly evils. Those living such a lifestyle are Gristhi.

== Theology ==
In traditional Indian religion, there are various paths (marg) to spirituality, such as Karam Marg (action, based on karam). Gyan Marg (knowledge, based on jñāna) and Bhakti Marg (devotion, based on bhakti). Sikhism advocates for two other methods, Naam Marg (name repetition) and Grist Marg (householder or family lifestyle). While in the Hindu ashram system, the Grihastha lifestyle is second in order, it is the most important lifestyle in Sikhism and exclusive focus is paid toward it, while the other three (Brahmacharya, Vanaprastha, and Sannyasa) are rejected. Within Sikhism, a gristhi lifestyle is advocated and seen as being open to all castes and sexes (both men and women), while renunciation was traditionally only available to men, with the religion criticizing men who abandoned their family to become sadhus or sanyasis.

As per Guru Nanak, all other lifestyles barring the householding one was plagued by illusion, with householders being purer. According to Guru Amar Das, the Grihastha lifestyle is superior to all other lifestyles (such as ascetics), as they are all ultimately supported by those living a Grihastha life. As per him, it is best to be spiritually detached while still living amongst others, becoming a gurmukh. Guru Arjan stated that it was the most fulfilling way to live a life. God is considered the most supreme householder of all by sustaining and permeating the Universe without being born or dying. As per Sikh theology, God created the numerous species of varying sexes with the ability to become attracted (kaam) to one another and procreate, thus living the life of a householder is aligned with hukam, being part of the natural cycle of birth and death. Human bonds and relationships are considered a sacred occurrence, managed by maryada (boundaries) and responsibilities. It is through such relationships that new human beings are brought into the world, with gurbani stressing the importance of a mother and a father. Sikhism rejects the belief that virgin births or other supernatural happenings can bring a new human into the world. A person living the life of a householder is a Grihasti. As an example for Sikhs to emulate, all the Sikh gurus (barring the eighth, who died in childhood) married and had children. Sikhs believe that a person should get married when they come of age. When channeled correctly, lust can be a positive force but without proper management, it leads to suffering. Marriage with a willing partner is recommended as a remedy to lust, rather than engaging in numerous, sexual relations. A person can attain God by following the spiritual path while living in society and following social norms. In gurbani, the meaning of a householder life is that a person should chant the name of the divine while living in the world, fulfill their duty towards a spouse, family, and children, and not be absorbed in them all, but should become a benefactor by knowing the light of God is within each one.

== Sectoral views ==
Some Nihangs and ascetic sects of Sikhism reject the householder lifestyle.
