= Piro Preman =

Punjabi poet

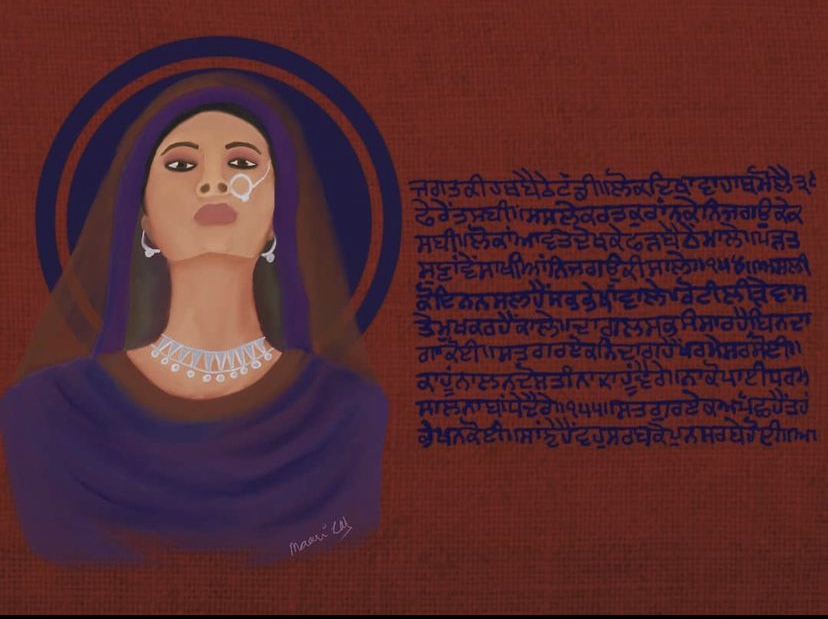
- Representation of Piro Preman featuring verses from her poetry – Ik Sau Saat Kaafiyan
- Born: 1832; Sikh Empire
- Died: 1872 or 1875; Punjab, British India
- Resting place: Chathian Wala, Kasur District, Punjab, Pakistan
- Notable work: Ik Sau Sath Kafian

Piro Preman (1832–1872 or 1875) was the first female Punjabi poet, and an ex-Muslim follower of the Gulabdasia sect. She was formerly a Dalit Mirasi Muslim courtesan(tawaif) and prostitute named Ayesha.

== Biography ==
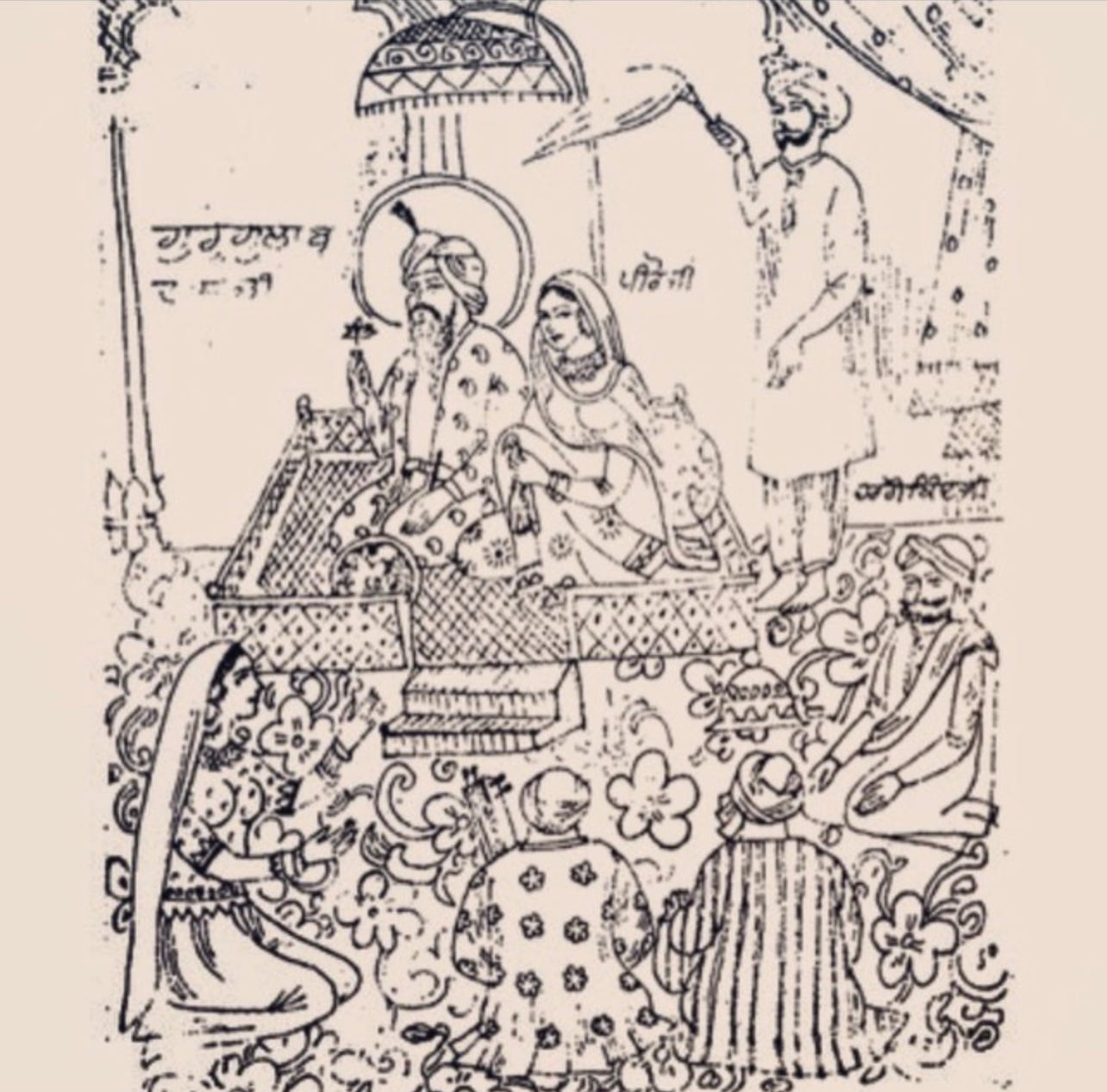
Gulab Das and Piro Preman sitting in the Gulabdasi Dera

Little is known about Piro's life. She apparently had Dalit origins. Her mother is said to have died early after she was born and she accompanied her fakir father to various places of pilgrimage. During one of these trips, she is believed to have been taken by a Lahori man who sold her into prostitution in a brothel. She is believed to have been sold into prostitution at Heera Mandi, the red-light district of Lahore. She escaped Heera Mandi and went on to become a devotee of Gulab Das at the Gulabdasi Dera in Chathian Wala (in present-day Pakistan). Das was a Sikh Jat who founded the Gulabdasi sect. The sect was based on Hindu–Sikh asceticism, but considered themselves to be neither Hindu nor Sikh.

Most of the information about Piro comes from her own autobiographical verses, the Ik Sau Sath Kafian or the "One Hundred and Sixty Kafis (160 Kafis)", written in the mid-nineteenth century. In 160 Kafis, Piro describes a series of events in her life after she began living with Gulab Das in Chathian Wala. Piro refers to herself as a prostitute, and also a Muslim. Following her arrival in Chathian Wala, Piro writes that her "professional wardens" from Heera Mandi followed her and persuaded Gulab Das to send her back to Lahore. She ultimately agreed to return to Lahore, where she describes a confrontation with mullahs and qazis who assume that she has not only become an apostate, but also converted to the religion of her guru, thus becoming a kafir. Piro does not deny apostasy or conversion, but refuses to convert back to Islam. She abuses the mullahs and Islam, and praises the spirituality of her guru. According to historian Anshu Malhotra, "The unabashed use of language that might be considered vulgar among the respectable today, adds a colourful dimension to Piro’s speech."

"Making false religions and promises,

You make Turks by snipping the penis and the moustache;

Hindus are made with janeyu and chat,

Women cannot be made thus, they are both wrong."

— Piro Preman, translated by Anshu Malhotra

Piro Preman refused to be an abandoned lover at the mercy of a cruel beloved. She refused to wait for a beloved who would deign to give her his acceptance. She wrote:

“Piro! I will not accept the companionship of a lie.

Those that are separated will never meet, just like a broken thread.

Nor family, nor your in-laws, not your age-mates, neither your friends.

They disperse as people do when they disembark from a boat.”

Piro writes that her actions result in her being abducted, and forcibly transported from Lahore to Wazirabad. She is incarcerated at Wazirabad by a woman named Mehrunissa. Piro describes that she was able to befriend two women, Janu and Rehmati, and utilise their help to send a message to Gulab Das. The guru sends two of his disciples, Gulab Singh and Chatar Singh, to Wazirabad. With the help of sympathisers, the disciples are able to rescue Piro and bring her back to Gulab Das' establishment in Chathian Wala.

Piro and Gulab Das shared an intimate relationship despite social and religious pressures. The two were interred together at a tomb in Chathian Wala. Although the Gulabdasis were neither Hindu nor Sikh, following the Partition of India, they were expelled from Chathian Wala by the now Muslim-majority populace in Pakistan. The sect subsequently fled to India where they settled in Haryana.

== In popular culture ==
Piro's life has been the subject of two Indian plays – Piro Preman written by Shahryar in 1999, and Shairi written by Sawrajbir in 2004. Shairi was also performed by Pakistani theatre group Ajoka Theatre led by Madeeha Gauhar in Lahore and by the theatre group Manch Rang Manch in Amritsar. A member of the Gulabdasis, Vijender Das, has also compiled all of her writings and published a volumed called Sant Kavyitri Ma Piro (Saint Poetess Mother Piro), together with a comprehensive introduction to her life.
