= Baba Amar Singh Nibber =

Baba Amar Singh Nibber was an important figure in 18th century Bandai Sikhism. He was a leader of the Bandai Sikh holdouts against the Tat Khalsa faction.

== Family background ==
Baba Amar Singh was born into a Nibber family of Khemkaran. In Sikh history, he is also known as Mahant Singh. His childhood name was Amar Chand but after taking Amrit, he became known as Bhai Amar Singh. His father Raghupat Rai nibbar was a big landlord of Khemkaran and came from a family whose ancestors held royal positions in the Moghul courts. According to Gyani Gyan Singh’s Panth Parkash also, Baba Amar Singh was of Nibber lineage.

Baba Amar Singh had an elder brother named Mool Chand. Bhai Mool Chand was an excellent soldier and had fought valiantly for Guru Gobind Singh in several battles prior to his martyrdom in the Battle of Nadaun on March 20, 1691.

Baba Amar Singh had a very powerful and athletic physique and measured well over six feet and half in height. He was a very fierce and formidable warrior in the battle-field and could continuously wield a double-edged sword (Kharasang or Khanda) weighing over fifty Ser (about twenty kilograms)

He was nicknamed as Bir (Knight).

== Martyrdom of Banda Bahadur ==
During siege of the Lohgarh fort of Banda Bahadur by Mughal forces in 1716, the Sikhs got bifurcated into two divisions: the Bandai Khalsa and the Tat Khalsa whereby the Tat Khalsa parted ways leaving Lohgarh to be defended by the Bandai Khalsa alone. After a long siege, Banda was arrested by Abdus Samad Khan along with his many followers and escorted to Delhi, chained in a cage. On June 9, 1716 he was barbarously executed along with hundreds of Sikhs and became a hallowed martyr in Sikh history.

== Amar Singh becomes the Bandai chief ==
After the martyrdom of Banda Bahadur, Baba Amar Singh had assumed the supreme leadership of the Bandai Khalsa faction.

== Feud among two Panthic war-factions continues ==
After the Lohgarh incidence, the friction between the two Panthic factions continued unabated and at times, there had also occurred minor scuffles between the two.

In 1721, Binod Singh Trehan of the Tat Khalsa sent an invitation to the entire Sikh community all over the Punjab to gather at Amritsar on Diwali day. The two factions met at Amritsar and each asserted its claim as being the true heir to Guru Gobind Singh and the Harimandir Sahib. Things looked gloomy for the Sikhs, since both military factions readied themselves for a showdown to assert their individual claims. The dangerous situation was averted at the Diwali occasion by the timely intervention of the Sikh Sangats (Congregations) but both factions continued to entertain anger and ill-will against each other.

== Bhai Mani Singh appointed as arbitrator ==
Mata Sundari, the widow of Guru Gobind Singh, came to learn of the trouble brewing between the two military factions at Amritsar. She appointed Bhai Mani Singh as the Granthi of the Harimandir and sent him to Amritsar with Kirpal Singh (Chand), the maternal uncle of Guru Gobind Singh to resolve the feud. The choice on Bhai Mani Singh seems to have fallen for intrinsic reasons also since Bhai Mani Singh, like Baba Baba Amar Singh was of Kamboj lineage and it was therefore hoped that he could better convince Baba Amar Singh and bring him to conciliation in the broader interests of the Khalsa Panth.

== Continued fued ==
After assuming office of the Head-Granthi in 1721, Bhai Mani Singh sent invitations to both parties to assemble on the Vaisakhi occasion. Both factions again met at Amritsar in compliance of the invitation from Bhai Mani Singh but with all the malice in their minds set against each other. At Amritsar, the Tat Khalsa took unilateral control of the Akal Bunga while the Jhanda Bunga was taken over by the Bandai Khalsa led by Baba Amar Singh.

Using a simplistic but well-intentioned procedure, Bhai Mani Singh was finally able to resolve the feud and restore peace among the warring factions and put the affairs of the Darbar Sahib in order in 1722. The final decision was that the Tat Khalsa was declared the genuine successor to Guru Gobind Singh and the Harimandir Sahib.

== Death ==
Both parties expressed their agreement and satisfaction over the decision taken by Bhai Mani Singh and the Bandai Khalsa followers of Baba Amar Singh went to join the Tat Khalsa but unexpectedly, at the last moment, trouble flared up and a deadly showdown took place in the very Parikrama of the Harimandir Sahib. Warriors from both sides unsheathed their swords and started to wield them fiercely and relentlessly against their own brethren with all the detachment of a professional soldier. There was great pandemonium and tumult in the Harimandir Prikarma in front of the Akal Takht and many were killed. The war scenes are described in very vivid and full graphic details in the Panth Prakash by Gyani Gyan Singh.

Baba Amar Singh wielded his double-edged sword relentlessly and after having slain numerous adversaries, finally, fell dead.

The following verse describes the death of Baba Amar Singh:

tad sudhasar that darshani darwaze agey Jang |
Mach gayo masurmedh ka dhar veech keech surang ||
kar sees pag bhuj bakh sabal hath majh asaar|
chad gayee luthain pe luthain kaat marey jawaan apaar |
Jab jujh dharani pai paryo Singh Amar anekan maar ||
Bhag gaye turat Bhandai leeni fateh Singhan maar

== Legacy ==
Baba Amar Singh was not the first Sikh who died at the hands of fellow Sikhs due to intra-Panthic differences. The phenomenon had been in existence since the time of the Gurus. However, the gory clash which occurred at the Harimandir's Parikrama between the Bandai and the Tat Khalsa would be replicated in the future as schisms would arise in the community and sometimes lead to deadly showdowns as the one involving Baba Amar Singh.

== Bibliography ==
1. Gyani Gyan Singh, Panth Prakash (1970), page 530
2. Gyani Garja Singh, Shaheed Bilaas, page 81
3. Prof Piara Singh Padam, Guru Kian Sakhian, Index
4. Gyani Gyan Singh, Panth Prakash (1970), page 530
5. Gyani Gyan Singh, Panth Prakash (1970), page 230
6. Gyani Gyan Singh, Panth Prakash (1970), pages 230-231
7. Gyani Gyan Singh, Panth Prakash, (1970), pages 230-231
