= Tulsi Sahib =

Sant Mat spiritual teacher

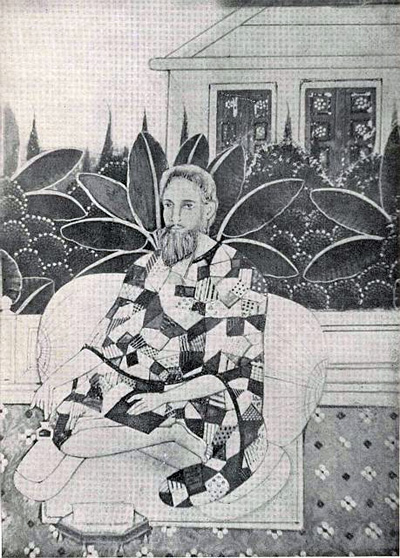
Tulsi Sahib, circa late-19th century

Tulsi Sahib (1763–1843), also known as Param Sant Tulsi Sahib of Hathras, was a Sant Mat spiritual leader. He was also known by the moniker Dakhani Baba (meaning "sage from the south"). Many Radha Soamis regard him as being the teacher of Shiv Dayal, yet there is no record of him initiating Shiv Dayal and his prime student was rather Girdhari Das instead. During his lifetime, various Sant Mat movements, such as Kabirpanth, Satnamis, and Sikh-related sects like Nirankaris and Namdharis, were influential. The teachings of Tulsi Sahib were mostly in-agreement with the doctrines that had been espoused by Kabir, Guru Nanak, Paltu Sahib, and Dariya Sahib.

== Biography ==
Very few details of his life can be reliably authenticated, much of what is known is based on Radhasoami accounts. According to popular tradition, his birth name was Shyam Rao and he was born into a Brahmin family of royal Maharashtrian-origin, who originated during the reign of Akbar. He was the son of Peshwa Doona of the Maratha Empire. He was forcibly married against his wishes as a child to a girl named Lakshmi Bai. He would renounce the material world as a young boy to seek the spiritual truth of life. It is believed he later settled in Hathras, where he discovered the truth he was seeking, establishing an ashram there. It is unknown who the spiritual guru of Tulsi was.

Tulsi Das taught that life consisted of a struggle against kal (mortality) and the negative power (personified as demonic force). The forces of goodness (personified as Kabir) were in battle against the evil forces of Kal (time). Tulsi believed that kal could be combated by following the teachings of a satguru ("true teacher"). He believed these teachings were hidden in everyone as a "remarkable interior sound" and that a seeker must find it within themselves. Once found, the seeker must focus on it and cultivate it to reach ever-higher stages of spiritual awareness.

This inner-reality is described by Tulsi Sahib as follows:

"The soul hears a wave of sound and rhythm ... and opens the door––unspeakable, indescribable. Going beyond rhythm and sight, one enters the gate of the tower of emptiness .... Then one sees the sound-current issuing forth hundreds of thousands of universes, and sound penetrates to the middle of them all, their crown-jewel, which is tiny as an insect."

— Tulsi Sahib, Ghat Ramayan (Allahabad: Belvedere Press, 1911)

Tulsi Sahib was a proponent of the concept and practice of shabad yoga. The three main practices espoused by Tulsi Sahib were as follows:

1. Repetition of sacred name(s)
2. Contemplation of the initiating guru or the inner-light
3. Listening to inner-sounds

The most famous of his works is the Ghat Ramayan (meaning "The Interior Ramayana"), which documents the dialogue held between Tulsi Sahib and Phul Das, a follower of Dharamdas of the Kabirpanthi tradition (specifically the Dharamdasi sub-tradition).

The chief disciple of Tulsi Sahib was Girdhari Das. After the death of Tulsi Das, the mantle of leadership of his Sant Mat lineage was passed to either Girdhari Das, Shiv Dayal, or Sur Swami, with the true successor being disputed depending on the Radhasoami branch. David Lane believes it is likely that Tulsi Sahib had instructed Shiv Dayal on listening to the inner sound current.

== Connection to Sikhism ==
Some of the Radhasoami movement, a contemporary Sant Mat tradition, have linked Guru Gobind Singh, and therefore the lineage of Sikh gurus, to Tulsi Sahib of Hathras by claiming that Guru Gobind Singh passed on leadership to a supposed individual named Ratnagar Rao, who then passed on the mastership to Tulsi Sahib of Hathras. The claim postulates that Guru Gobind Singh visited a ruling family of Peshwas whilst he was in the Deccan, which is how Tulsi Sahib became acquainted with the Sikh guru after he stayed with the family. However, there is no evidence that Ratnagar Rao actually existed and this claim first arose with Kirpal Singh, possibly as an effort to link the Radhasoami movement to the lineage and teachings of Sikhism. However, this belief of a connection between Guru Gobind Singh and Tulsi Sahib is not widely accepted by Radhasoami branches aside from the Ruhani Satsang branch.

== Legacy ==
Tulsi Sahib was highly regarded by Shiv Dayal, who regarded him as being his antecedent. It is believed that the parents of Shiv Dayal were sehajdhari, non-Khalsa Sikh followers of Tulsi Sahib. Some Radhasoamis believe that Tulsi Sahib had foretold of the coming of Shiv Dayal and predicted his coming leadership, which is not corroborated in surviving literature and accounts. It is likely that Tulsi Das' probable immediate successor Girdhari Das, had groomed Shiv Dayal and instructed him for some time, seeing as there is a noticeable gap between the death of Tulsi Das (died 1843) and the establishment of Shiv Dayal's satsang in 1861. Girdhari Das had died in July 1860, shortly prior to the establishment of Shiv Dayal's satsang. Shiv Dayal would go-on to establish the Radhasoami movement, which in-turn led to numerous other groups, such as Eckankar, MasterPath, MSIA, and Quan Yin.

== Works ==
- Shabdavali
- Ratan Sagar
- Ghat Ramayan
- Padma Sagar (unfinished)
