= Gangushahi =

Sikh sect

Gangushahi is a Sikh sect that is mostly found in the Shivalik Hills region. The sect was opposed to mainstream Sikhs as they had installed Kharak Singh as their guru in the period after the ending of a personal guruship with the death of Guru Gobind Singh.

== History ==
The Gangushahi sect that can be traced back to Gangu Shah, also known as Gangu Das, whom was a manji preacher assigned by Guru Amar Das to the Shivalik Hills region, being given a seat in the Sirmur region. Gangu Shah had been born into a Basi Khatri family in Garhshankar. According to Sikh lore, Gangu had presented four pice weight of gur, all of his material possessions, to Guru Amar Das before the guru dispatched him to on the preaching mission to the Shivalik Hills. Over-time, his preaching attracted many followers, with the group growing into their own order. The great-grandson of Gangu, Javahar Singh, consolidated a new sect of Sikhs based on the following of Gangu. (Note: Javahar Singh's forename is alternatively spelt as 'Jawahar'.) During this time, the Gangushahi leader Javahar Singh commanded a large force in the hills region. The Gangushahis constructed their own shrines at Daun (near Kharar in Ropar district), which had been built under Gangu Shah, and Khatkar Kalan (near Banga in Jalandhar district), which had been built under Javahar Singh. These shrines are still places of veneration to this day by followers of the sect.

The Gangushahis were ex-communicated by the Khalsa when their incumbent gaddi, Kharak Singh, in circa 1708 (around the time of Guru Gobind Singh's death) said the rest of the Sikhs congregations were "widowed" since no Sodhi was on the gaddi, implicitly implying that he is left to lead the Sikhs as a guru. Furthermore, there are claims he performed miracles. Kharak Singh was a successor of a renowned follower of Guru Amar Das. The Gangushahis under Kharak Singh were against the khande di pahul ceremony, insteading advocating for the original charan amrit initiation ceremony.

Gangushahis still exist today, albeit in small numbers, inhabiting the Shivalik Hills region, particularly in the areas of Jauharsar, Pinjaur, Dagshai, and Nahan. They maintain their own deras and they do not strictly adhere to mainstream Sikh customs nor rehat (codes of conduct).
