= Chathian Wala =

چٹھیانوالا
- Town
- Location within Pakistan
- Coordinates: 30°56′56″N 73°44′36″E
- Country: Pakistan
- Province: Punjab
- District: Kasur
- Time zone: UTC+5 (PST)

Chathian Wala is a town and Union Council of Kasur District in the Punjab province of Pakistan. It is part of Kasur Tehsil and is located at 31°18'0N 74°31'0E with an altitude of 207 metres (682 feet).

According to the 2017 census, the population of this town is 10,772, with 5,596 males and 5,176 females.

The town was the main centre for the Gulabdasi sect.
