= Namdhari =

Sikh sect

- Vishav Namdhari Sangat
- Nickname: Kuka
- Formation: April 1857
- Founder: Satguru Ram Singh
- Founded at: Sri Bhaini Sahib
- Type: Sect of Sikhism
- Headquarters: Sri Bhaini Sahib
- Members: Claim to number between 5 and 10 lakhs (500,000-1 million), consisting primarily of Jat, Ramgarhia, Arora, and Mazhabi castes.
- Official language: Punjabi
- Leader: Satguru Uday Singh
- Key people: Suba Balwinder Singh Jhall (president of Namdhari Darbar)
- Main organ: Namdhari Darbar
- Website: sribhainisahib.com

The Namdharis (Gurmukhi: ਨਾਮਧਾਰੀ; Devanagari: नामधारी; Shahmukhi: نامدھاری; nāmadhārī, meaning "bearers of the name"), also known as Kuka (Gurmukhi: ਕੂਕਾ; kūkā (sing.); ਕੂਕੇ; kūkē (pl.): from Punjabi kuk, “scream” or “cry”), are a Sikh sect that differs from mainstream Sikhs chiefly in their belief that the lineage of Sikh Gurus did not end with Satguru Gobind Singh (1666–1708) in 1708, as they recognise Satguru Balak Singh (1797–1862) as the 11th Guru of the Sikh religion, thus continuing the succession of Sikh Gurus through the centuries from Satguru Nanak Dev to the present day. Their 12th Guru is Satguru Ram Singh [1816–1885(disputed)], who moved the sect's centre to Sri Bhaini Sahib (Ludhiana) and is regarded as the first Indian to use non-cooperation and non-violence boycott in order to combat the British Empire in India.

== Names ==
The most common names for the sect are Namdhari or Kuka. Some texts, including earlier British government reports refer to them as Jagiasi or Abhiasi.

== Beliefs ==
Namdhari Sikhs believe that the lineage of Sikh gurus did not end with Satguru Gobind Singh and that he did not die at Nanded, instead lived-on as a recluse under the pseudonym of "Ajapal Singh", passing on the Guruship to Satguru Balak Singh before his death. They recognise Satguru Balak Singh as the 11th Guru of the Sikh religion, thus continuing the succession of Sikh Gurus through the centuries from Satguru Nanak Dev to the present day. Each member of the Namdhari community is given Amrit at a young age, they do not consume meat, alcohol or drugs. The 12th Guru Satguru Ram Singh is regarded as the first Indian to use non-cooperation and non-violence boycott in order to combat the British Empire in India. Namdhari Sikhs have a strong belief that Guru Ram Singh will return one day and deny that he died in 1885.

The Namdhari Sikhs are advocates for Guru Nanak Dev's message and philosophy of sharing material resources, including food with the needy, earn an honest living and to unify with the creator by appreciating and reciting the God's Name. To address the new challenge of British imperialism, Satguru Ram Singh initiated a new reform movement. Thakur mentions that Satguru Ram Singh "decided to use of same technique, the same methods and the same principles for meeting the challenge before him as Guru Gobind Singh." Sirdar Kapur Singh opined that "Baba Ram Singh preached the same principles of the path shown to Indians and others by Guru Nanak Dev, Guru Gobind Singh and the ten Guru Sahibs." The colonial administration had labelled the Namdhari community as 'criminal tribe' and in 1904 remarked that "it is not possible for a Kuka to be loyal subject of the British Government..."

They do not believe in any religious ritual other than the recital of God's name (or nām, which is why members of the sect are called Namdharis). They reject the worship of idols, graves, tombs, gods and goddesses. The Namdharis had more of a social impact than the Nirankaris at the time of its founding due to the fact that they emphasised Khalsa identity, seeking to re-establish it, and the authority of the Guru Granth Sahib, as well as their clashes with the British colonial authority. They call their houses of worship dharamsalas, though they freely attend other gurdwaras, maintaining family and friendship ties across sect lines.

They consider Guru Granth Sahib and Dasam Granth as equally important, and compositions from the Chandi di Var are a part of their daily Nitnem. They circumambulate the fire (havan) during their weddings, but they differ in that the hymns are those from the Adi Granth.

== History ==
=== Role in the Indian freedom movement ===
Satguru Ram Singh aimed to orient the strength of people towards freedom and to initiate this task, it was necessary to introduce reform of their character and raise it to the level of its inception. He hoisted a white triangular flag, symbolising freedom and peace on 12 April 1857 at Sri Bhaini Sahib. Namdhari movement also worked to establish contacts with foreign powers to achieve Indian Independence. Contacts with Kashmir, Nepal and Russia were established by Namdhari Sikhs in this regard. Since its beginning, the Namdhari movement maintained its religious, social and political dimensions to coordinate efforts for the freedom struggle. While the religious and social work was carried out in the open, the political agenda was carried on covertly.

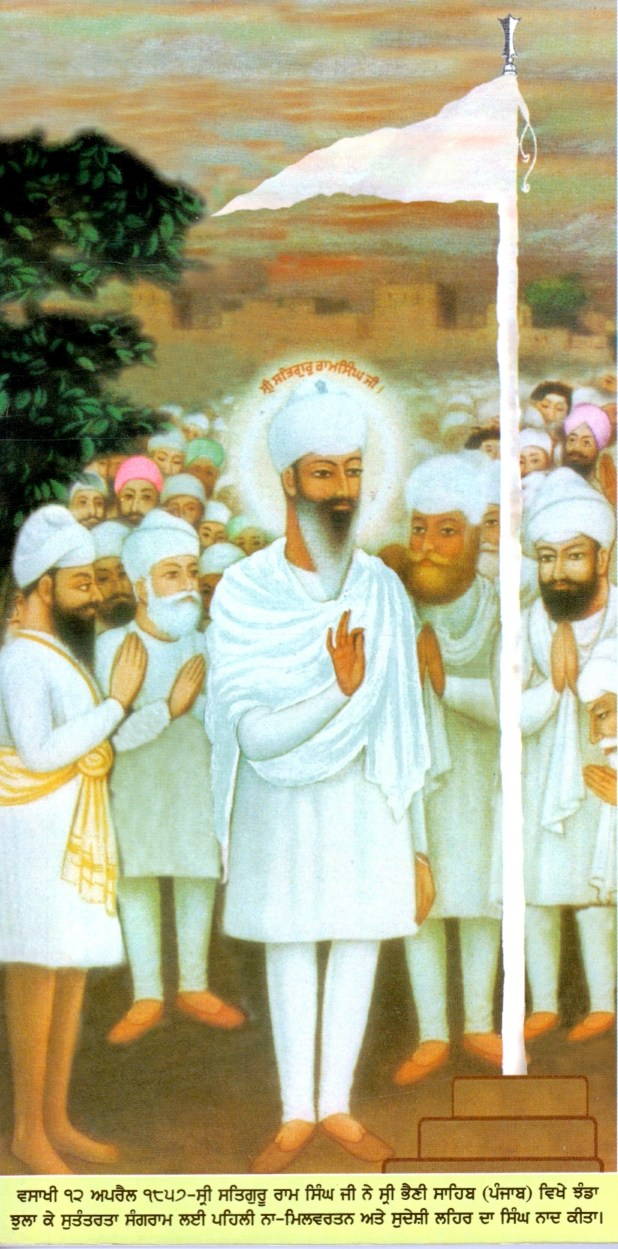
The White triangular flag symbolising peace.

Satguru Ram Singh established a covert, private postal service consisting of trusted couriers to deliver and receive messages. Namdhari Sikhs opposed the imperial British policy of cultural intervention. The British imperialists had encouraged the slaughter of cows, a practice that was entirely prohibited in the Sikh empire of Maharaja Ranjit Singh, in order to divide Punjabis by supporting anti-social elements.

A large, Gothic cathedral-style Clock Tower was built near the Sikh Golden Temple, among other changes, which included demolishing of the Bunga of Kanwar Naunihal Singh and Attari of Rani Sada Kaur. The imperial government practically ran the Golden Temple, and the priesthood class there did not care for the Sikh sentiments. Sirdar Kapur Singh mentions "...the (imperial) Britishers made public kine-killing lawful and general in the annexed Punjab and gratuitously and devilishly established a public kine-slaughter house adjacent to the Golden Temple, which they also annexed." Cow slaughter threatened regional social peace. In the late nineteenth century, newspaper Aftab-i-Punjab (Lahore), Wasir-ul-Mulk (Sialkot), and Koh-i-Nur (Lahore) reported that "kine-killing was done by the orders of the authorities who 'desired that disharmony should prevail' between Hindus and Muslims." While in the Viceroy's Legislative Council in 1862, the Maharaja of Patiala petitioned for a beef ban in India. This idea was rejected by Council, indicating the lack of sovereignty in Indian, and even in religious affairs, for Indian rulers.

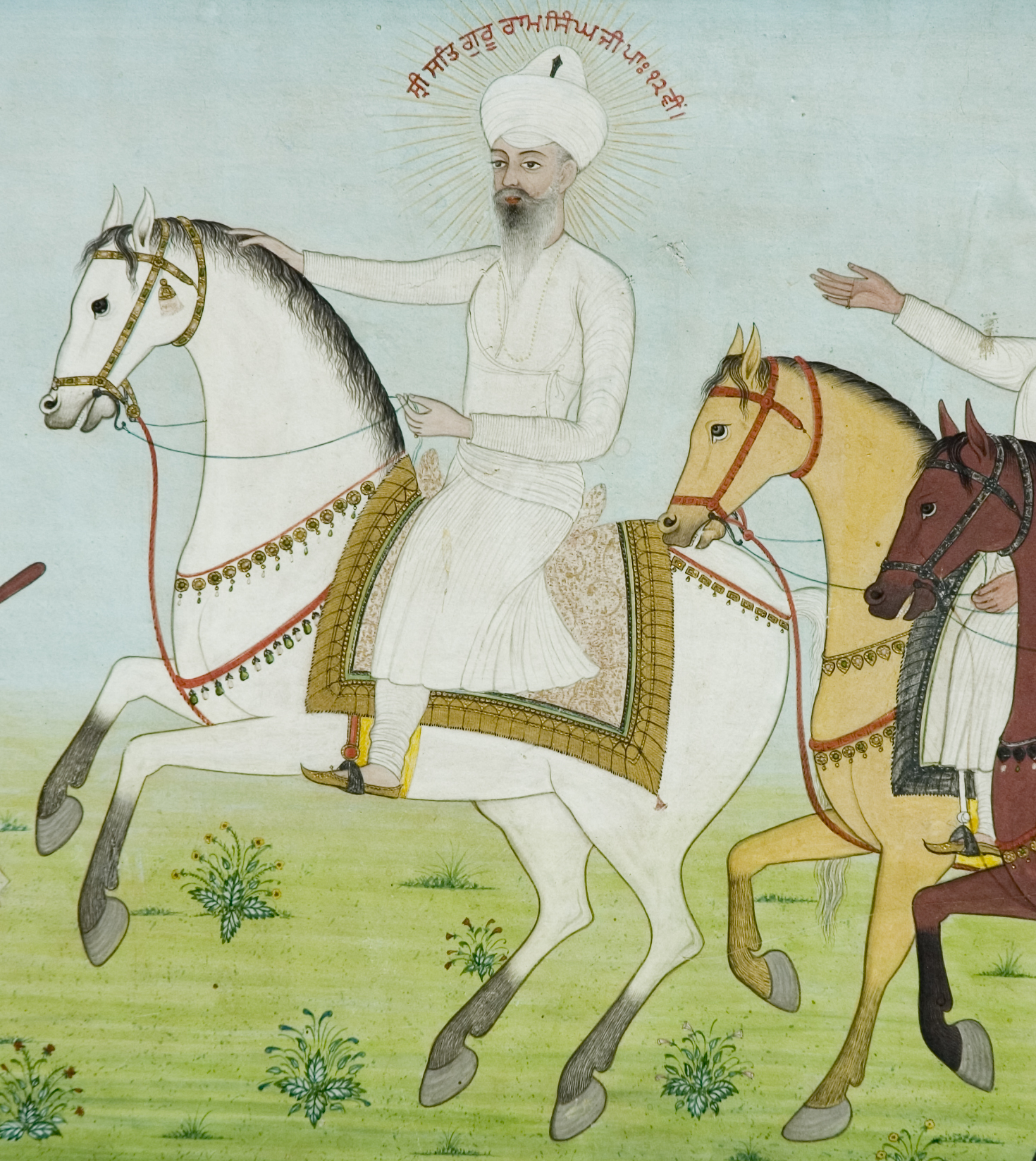
Equestrian painting of Ram Singh Kuka

In a series of events that happened, the sect members targeted the imperial Government-backed slaughterhouses in Amritsar and Raikot. In the aftermath, Namdhari Sikhs involved in these incidents were hanged by the British Government. A group of 66 Namdhari Sikhs were executed by cannons on 17–18 January 1872 after a group of 125 attacked a slaughterhouse in Malerkotla.

Satguru Ram Singh was sent to Allahabad with his servant (Nanu Singh) on 18 January 1872, in the morning hours from Ludhiana by a special train. On 10 March 1872, Satguru Ram Singh was shifted to Calcutta. On 11 March 1872, he was sent to Rangoon in British Burma. He was kept there until 18 September 1880, and then shifted to Mergui in Burma, in an attempt to make contact with him more difficult.

Even in exile, Satguru Ram Singh worked endlessly to keep the freedom struggle alive even sending his Suba (Lieutenant) Bishan Singh to Moscow, in order to gain the support of Czar Nicholas II of Russia, in removing British rule in India. Suba Bishan had made contact with Maharaja Duleep Singh who was also in Moscow at the time looking to gain support of the Russian Czar in order to expel the British from India, and re-institute the once flourishing Sikh Empire. However, due to the Russian-Turkish War (1877-1878) the Russians were not keen on supporting any Indian nationalist in going to war against the British Empire.

Satguru Ram Singh was reported to have died in 1885 by the British authorities, but this claim was refuted by Namdhari Sikhs. According to Sikh historian Jaswinder Singh, the telegraph's contents claiming Ram Singh had died is contradicted by a letter written by Charles Bernard, Chief Commissioner of British Burma, on 23 August 1886, addressed to Attar Singh of Bhadaur, that "Ram Singh, Kuka, is going to be transferred to a more remote spot, where communication with him will be less easy". Furthermore, Jaswinder Singh notes "... the Jail Report Statement No. XVI — Vital, showing the deaths of convicts in the jails and subsidiary jails of British Burma, during the year 1885, does not list any death at Mergui due to 'Dysentery and Diarrhoea.' The column No. I in the proforma has been kept blank." Jaswinder Singh Historian states that after Guru Hari Singh (brother of Guru Ram Singh) received the claimed personal items of Satguru Ram Singh after his brother's alleged death, the items he received were refused as belonging to his brother. Jaswinder Singh concludes the following: "It can, therefore, be concluded that Guru Ram Singh did not expire; on 29th November 1885. Either he was transferred to a ‘more remote spot’ as intimated by the Chief Commissioner of British Burma, or disappeared quietly from the prison." Namdhari Sikhs maintain firm belief that he is alive and will return. In 1875, Satguru Ram Singh authorised his younger brother Budh Singh to lead the community, renaming him as Satguru Hari Singh. Satguru Ram Singh made Satguru Hari Singh the Sir-Karta (head) of the Namdhari sect. At this time, the British Government had let loose strict restrictions on the movements and activities of Namdhari Sikhs. Even during these difficult times, Satguru Hari Singh continued the anti-colonial efforts. It was under his guidance that a tri-partite message contact between Satguru Ram Singh in Rangoon and Satguru Hari Singh in Sri Bhaini Sahib was established with Russian authorities in Samarkand. In 1899, Satguru Hari Singh distributed food freely to the poor, which led to British Government softening their otherwise hard stance against the Namdhari Sikhs and praised Satguru's efforts during the draught years. Namdhari sources mention a meeting of Satguru Hari Singh with Deputy Commissioner of Ludhiana, where he offered 2500 acres of land grant in lieu of Satguru's service to the needy during the testing times. Satguru Hari Singh replied, "By giving 2500 acres from our country, you want to emphasise that the rest of country is yours? This entire country is ours, and we will take it back as a whole from you." Satguru Hari Singh guided the sect till 17 May 1906, after which, his elder son, Satguru Partap Singh led the community. The Indian National Congress's call for Purna Swaraj (Complete Independence) was attended by Guru Partap Singh on 31 December 1929. Thousands of Namdhari Sikhs participated in the procession. One hundred horses were sent for the procession, free langar was organised by the Namdhari Sikhs and Mata Jeewan Kaur, mother of Satguru Partap Singh played a vital role in these arrangements. Satguru Partap Singh rendered support to Indian National Congress and freedom fighters at various occasions in concerted actions against the colonial Government. His elder son, Beantji (later Satguru Jagjit Singh) assumed the leadership of the sect in August 1959. Satguru Jagjit Singh had rendered his services for rehabilitation of the refugees along with his father post-partition. Tatla mentions how influential figures like Satguru Jagjit Singh 'brought standards of social and religious judgement among overseas Sikh communities much closer to the Punjabi society'. During the overseas visits of Satguru Jagjit Singh, collective 'naam simran', a practice started by Satguru Ram Singh, had been specially emphasised. Naam simran and cultural integrity are important aspects in the overseas programmes of Satguru Uday Singh as well.

=== Rehabilitation of refugees ===
The demography of the Namdhari community was significantly altered by the partition of Punjab in 1947. Thousands of Namdhari agriculturists and artisans were compelled to abandon their ancestral villages and towns in the West Punjab (Pakistan) and relocate to the villages and towns of the East Punjab (India). District Sialkot was the source of over 80% of the Namdhari migrants. Their migration and settlement patterns were comparable to those of Hindus and Sikhs. They were subjected to financial and physical hardships, as well as communal violence. Nevertheless, Satguru Partap Singh was a critical figure in the resettlement of these migrants. He acquired thousands of acres of land in the current District of Sirsa (Haryana) and established a headquarters known as Jeewan Nagar. Apart from this, Satguru Partap Singh arranged for settlement of many people in Bir Bhamarsi (district Patiala), Mandi town (Himachal Pardesh) and Kapurthala. Joginder Singh notes that in districts of Hoshiarpur, Gurdaspur, Kapurthala, Fatehgarh Sahib, Jalandhar and Ferozepur, Namdhari Sikhs cooperated during these difficult times, motivated by the spirit of bhaichara (brotherhood) and gurbhais (co-religionists).

== Namdhari Rehatnama ==
The Namdhari Sikhs observe maryada (code of conduct), which comprises daily naam simran (recital), earning livelihood by honest means and showing piety to the people. After taking full bath, they meditate on the name of God in the early morning. Satguru Ram Singh instructed Namdhari Sikhs to remember and recite at least Jap Sahib, Jaap Sahib, Rehraas and Aarti Sohila. Namdhari Sikhs recite Chandi di vaar, concluding it with sunrise every morning.

The Namdhari Rehatnama (manual of code of conduct) promotes singing of hymns daily and also sets out a conduct which should be followed if a Havan is to be performed, listing out which texts should be read and how the area should be prepared. It banned child weddings and banned taking money from sisters or daughters along with outlawing of gambling.

Special care is taken to remain fully maintained in Sikh rehat by Namdhari Sikhs. Namdhari Sikhs are bearers of the five Ks of Sikhi tradition. Cutting of hairs is strictly prohibited. Saroop Singh Alag mentions the respect to kes (hair) exemplified by Satguru Jagjit Singh. On 16 July 1991, Satguru Jagjit Singh underwent bypass surgery of heart at the age of 71 years in Royal Adelaide Hospital, Australia with the conditions that no part of his body hair be cut, his dastar be always on his head at all times, and that he not be administered any alcohol-based sedatives. Australian newspapers 'Telegraph Mirror' and 'The news' reported this incident, highlighting the respect accorded to hair in the Sikhi tradition. Kangha (comb) is always kept in hair, and kirpan (sword) is placed inside kangha symbolically. Kara (iron baglke) is always worn in arm and kachhera (undergarment) is worn at all times. After bath, when old kachhera is removed from one leg, new kachhera is worn before removing the old kachhera from the other leg, thereby remaining in five Ks at all times.

Giani Gian Singh mentions the Namdhari rehat in his work Panth Prakash. Gian Singh terms the transformation initiated by Satguru Ram Singh as Satjug, the best era among the four eras of Indic epistemology. Multiple writers have asserted that rehat revived by Satguru Ram Singh was identical to that prescribed by Satguru Gobind Singh, but which was lost in practice during the intervening years.

== Practices ==
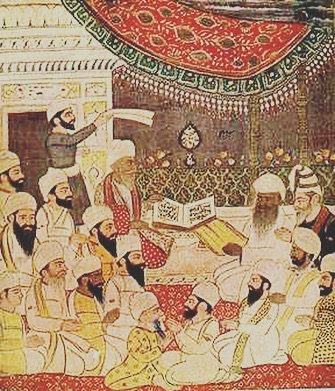
Painting of a Namdhari or Kuka (Sikh sect) congregation of Guru Ram Singh Kuka performing katha (Sikh religious discourse lecture) with an opened scripture of Guru Granth Sahib.

The Namdhari Sikhs wear homespun white turbans, which they wrap around their heads (sidhi pagri). Around their necks, they wear a white woolen cord (mala), woven as a series of 108 knots and serving as a rosary.

They are called Kuka, which means "crier, shouter", for their ecstatic religious practices during devotional singing. They also meditate, using mala (rosary). Namdhari Sikhs follow a strict lacto-vegetarian diet and also advocate for cow protection. They abstain from the use of alcohol, caffeine and tobacco.

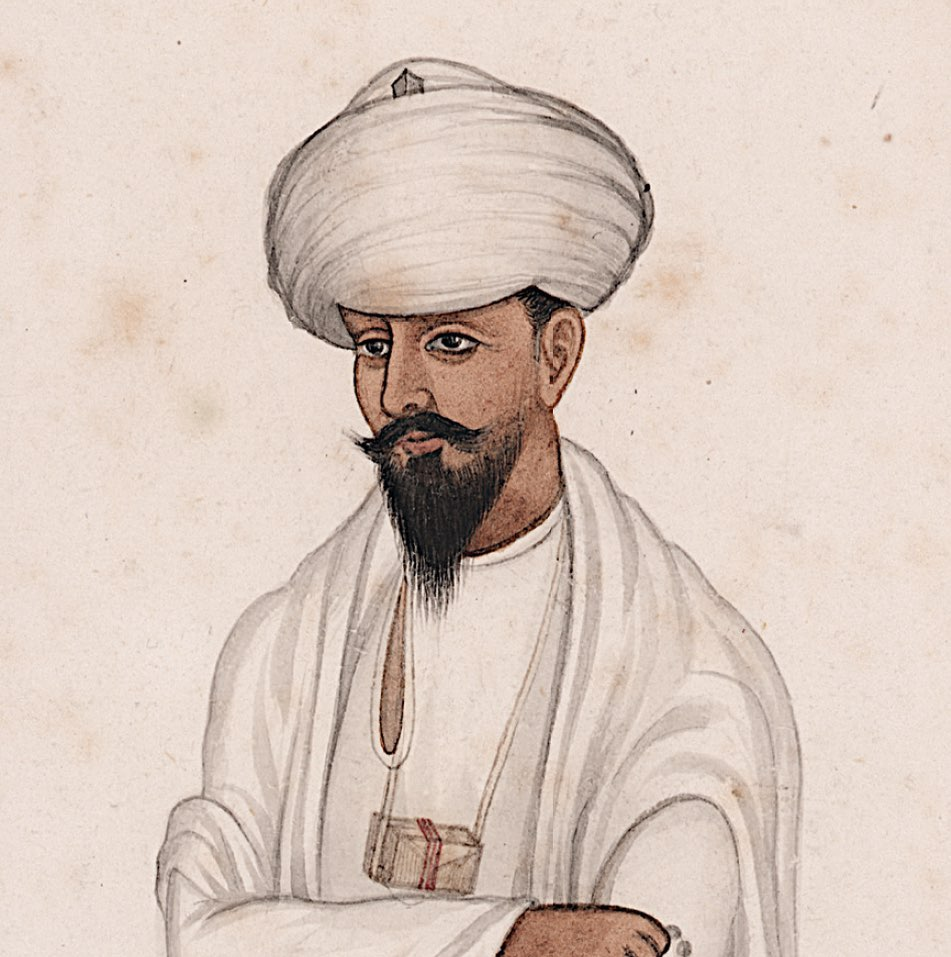
Painting of a Namdhari Sikh or Kuka Sikh, by Kapur Singh, Amritsar, ca.1860–65

The Namdhari community also perform Hom (Havan) in which an assembly of seven people who are practitioners of Sodh maryada recite Gurbani from the Guru Granth Sahib and Dasam Granth for the wellbeing of humanity. According to Namdhari Sikhs, the modern form of performing Havan's within the Sikh community originates back to Satguru Gobind Singh. During the wedding ceremony (Anand Karaj), a Namdhari couple circumambulates around the fire, while hymns from Guru Granth Sahib are recited. Satguru Partap Singh supported Singh Sabhas in their efforts to obtain legal authority for the Anand maryada of marriage. The proponents of Anand maryada, which included Maharajas of Patiala and Nabha, and the Singh Sabhas, mentioned that Namdhari Sikhs 'have never been known to perform any other ceremony than the Anand at their marriages'. While Talwar mentions that the predominant role in passing of the Anand Marriage Act of 1909 was that of Singh Sabhas, Giani Gian Singh credits Satguru Ram Singh as being the first to have started the practice of marriage amongst Sikhs with the recital of four laavans concluding with recital of Anand Sahib. Tatla mentions that some families abroad would wait, sometimes over a year, for the visit of Satguru Jagjit Singh to conduct the marriages.

Satguru Jagjit Singh provided a new dimension to marriages amongst Namdhari Sikhs. He completely banned dowry, and in the events organised by Namdhari Vidyak Jathas, many youngsters were given a pledge not to take or give dowry during their marriages. To commemorate the initiation of the first Anand Karaj ceremonies in Sikh tradition—established in 1863 by Satguru Ram Singh in Khote village with the recitation of four laavans followed by Anand Sahib—Satguru Jagjit Singh organised a mass wedding of 149 Namdhari couples on 24 June 1964, marking the 100th anniversary of this tradition. According to the practice established, the parents, in consultation with local leaders or trusted individuals, propose a boy or girl for marriage. They complete a form created by the Vishav Namdhari Sangat at Sri Bhaini Sahib, which includes details such as names, occupations, and gotra (exogamous caste groups) of the boy's and girl's paternal and maternal families, along with their birthdates, heights, and qualifications. The parents affirm that no dowry has been exchanged and that they are abiding by Satguru's commands. The Vishav Namdhari Sangat verifies that both the boy and girl meet the required age, possess a gurmukh appearance, and are able to recite ardas. They also ensure that the families are not closely related. Additionally, a Suba and two responsible persons confirm these details. Before the anand-riti ceremony, the parents perform sehaj paths (recitation of the Sri Adi Guru Granth Sahib) either in their homes or at Sri Bhaini Sahib. This way, the Namdhari Anand marriages stand out as an exception to an otherwise extravagant wedding culture of North India, which has been flagged as a social menace by many. Naam simran and Gurbani recital are one of the primary routines of Namdhari Sikhs. Namdhari Sikhs have made immense contributions to the Kirtan style of Gurbani singing, pioneered by Satguru Partap Singh, who employed professional rababis (players of the traditional Rabab instrument) to perform the kirtan of Asa Di Var in ragas for over two and a half hours in the morning and a few hours in the evening. In 1928, he founded the Namdhari Mahavidalaya, and Bhai Harman Singh (Chavinda) was named Ustad to teach the students Shastri Sangeet. Up to their 1947 migration to Pakistan, Bhai Taba and Bhai Naseer occasionally sang ragas at Sri Bhaini Sahib. In 1933, Satguru Partap Singh also established the Gurmat Sangeet Samelan, which made Sri Bhaini Sahib popular among notable Ustads of the day, both instrumental and vocal. Satguru Jagjit Singh organised national Gurmat Sangeet Samellans in Delhi, Mumbai, Aurangabad, and Lucknow between 1973 and 1980 and taught young people in Indian classical style of music. In India and elsewhere, he founded a number of music education centers. Namdhari Sikhs are instructed to perform Naam simran for at least one hour daily, and to perform one recital of either Guru Granth Sahib or Dasam Granth Sahib per family. Besides this, each year Namdhari Sikhs engage in longer duration of Naam simran during the month of Assu (mid September to mid-October), known as Jap Prayog. Many persons abstain from the usual pleasures of life and devote their time to meditation, reciting gurbani, kirtan, paaths and general seva. A few keep sodh also, which is a practice of ablution and purification to lead a puritan way of life.

Namdhari Sikhs have performed mass recitals of Gurbani, emphasising its importance in their thought process. One lakh twenty five recitals of Guru Granth Sahib have been performed five times by the community.

== Inter-faith harmony ==
=== Guru Nanak Sarv Sampradaya conference ===
The “Guru Nanak Sarv Sampradaya” conference was organised by Satguru Partap Singh in 1934 at Sri Bhaini Sahib with the aim of uniting all who believed in or followed the teachings of Guru Nanak. It was attended by various sects of Sikhism, including Akali, Nirmala, Udasi, Seva Panthi, Nihang, Sahajdari, Adanshahi etc. Khalsa Diwan, Shiromani Gurdwara Parbandhak Committee, Shiromani Akali Dal, Udasi Mahamandal, Nirmal Mahamandal also attended the event and resolved to address any issues amicably. The President of this conference was Bhai Arjan Singh Ji Bagria. It was attended by eminent personalities of Sikh Panth, including Sunder Singh Majithia, Principal Jodh Singh and Bhai Kahn Singh Nabha. The main agenda of this conference was to create harmony and unity amongst all sects of Sikhs, who believed in Satguru Nanak Dev and in the doctrines of the Holy Sri Aadi Guru Granth Sahib and the Holy Sri Dasam Granth.

The resolutions passed in this conference urged the Sikh sects to prioritise the preaching of Gurbani within their groups and emphasised that all religious figures, including preachers, missionaries, musicians, editors, and leaders, should engage solely in constructive actions. It called on the Shiromani Gurdwara Parbandhak Committee, local Gurdwara management committees, and other Sikh societies to appoint the most qualified individuals from relevant sects to positions such as Granthi or preacher, with special consideration for the sect previously managing a given Gurdwara before it was taken over. Lastly, it emphasised promotion of unity and avoiding unnecessary legal issues.

=== Efforts for Hindu-Muslim-Sikh unity ===
In 1943, Satguru Partap Singh organised a Hindu-Sikh unity conference in Sri Bhaini Sahib, stressing the importance of unity among Hindus and Sikhs. Thereafter, a Hindu-Sikh-Muslim conference was organised to bring all sections of society for peaceful co-existence and to face the challenge of imperialism with new vigor.

=== Sarab Dharam Samellan (Inter-faith dialogues) ===
Under the guidance of Satguru Uday Singh, five Sarab Dharam Sammelans (inter-faith dialogues) have been held at Sri Bhaini Sahib, Australia, Canada and England. In the inter-faith dialogue held at Sri Bhaini sahib on March, 2023, different sect leaders requested Satguru Uday Singh to initiate a series of such dialogues so that the mission of religious togetherness does not get broken in-between. Thereafter, similar events in other locations were organised and were appreciated by the participants and the audience. These events have witnessed participation from many denominations of different religions, including Hinduism, Islam and Christianity, apart from Sikhism. These foster a sense of belonginess among all and emphasises the need for helping the needy as the main objective of all religions.

== Indian classical music ==
Namdhari Sikhs have made significant contributions to Indian classical music, particularly through the preservation and promotion of devotional music known as Shabad Kirtan. This genre, rooted in the teachings of Guru Nanak, emphasises the recitation of hymns from the Guru Granth Sahib, fostering a deep spiritual connection. At the same time, Namdhari community under the guidance of Satguru Jagjit Singh has also been instrumental in reviving traditional forms such as Dhrupad and Ghazal, integrating these styles into their musical practices. Many eminent musicians of the country have been supported by the community. On 14 April 2013, The Sangeet Natak Akademi honored Satguru Jagjit Singh with the prestigious Sangeet Natak Academy Tagore Rattan Award for his ocntributions in the field of Music. The Namdhari commitment to music as a medium for spiritual expression continues to enrich the cultural landscape of India. In 2019, a documentary "Sangeet Saroop Satguru" was released, which highlighted the contributions of Satguru Jagjit Singh in the field of Indian classical music and his efforts in bringing all the maestros at one place for taking this abstract art to the next generation.

== Sports and health ==
One of the most critical attributes of an ideal contemporary society is the absence of addiction to narcotics, alcohol, or any other form of intoxication. To encourage youth to lead a healthy life, Satguru Jagjit Singh and Satguru Uday Singh have promoted sports activities on a large scale. The Namdhari Sports Academy, with its roots in Sirsa, Haryana, has also produced several hockey players who have the distinction of playing for the Indian National Hockey Team. These players are Harpal Singh, Sardara Singh (Captain of Indian Hockey Team), Jasbir Singh, Sher Singh, Gurwinder Singh, Gurcharan Singh, Karamjit Singh, Avtar Singh, Anmol Singh, Harwinder Singh, Savinder Singh and Harjinder Singh. Satguru Uday Singh is the patron of Namdhari Hockey Team. Namdhari Sports Academy was the first-ever in the country to have their own Astro-Turf installed at Sri Bhaini Sahib for excellence in training. Namdhari Sports Academy is affiliated with the Indian Hockey Federation. The Namdhari hockey team's members actively participate in the national hockey championships for Sub Junior, Junior, and Senior. Namdhari XI is a well-known name in the Indian hockey community. Namdhari XI's name became synonymous with high-quality hockey teams in India as a result of the notable accomplishments of the first team from 1980 to 2000. Namdhari Football Club is an Indian professional football club based in Sri Bhaini Sahib, Punjab. Part of the multi-sports Namdhari Sports Academy, it competes in the Punjab State Super League. Namdhari FC bid and joined the I-League, current second division of the Indian football league system. Namdhari Sports Academy is a premier facility of the area that uses sports science and performance analytics to further enhance training outcomes. Namdhari Sikhs strictly adhere to a disciplined lifestyle, grounded in vegetarianism and a strong commitment to purity in dietary choices. They avoid all market-prepared foods, including soft drinks, tea, and coffee, as part of their commitment to a simple, wholesome diet. Namdhari youth also refrains from alcohol, tobacco, and any form of intoxicants. While they do participate in social gatherings, they are careful to consume only strictly vegetarian food, avoiding anything that contains non-vegetarian ingredients. This disciplined lifestyle is central to their spiritual practice and identity. Tatla mentions that "on a practical plane, only the Namdhari sect, members of which adhere to strict vegetarianism and homespun clothes, are dedicated to conserving the 'mother planet' for all. In 2005, Namdhari Durbar made efforts to build a multi-specialty "Satguru Partap Singh Apollo" hospital in Ludhiana to cater to the needs of the district and adjoining region. Manmohan inaugurated the event and formally unveiled the plaque in the presence of other dignitaries. He highlighted the importance of preventing female foeticide, following the teachings of Sikh Gurus who called for upliftment of women. In 2014, Satguru Partap Singh Hospital won the prestigious FICCI Healthcare Excellence Award for Patient Safety for its Tracheostomy Care Nurse Program and other awards in Excellence for Healthcare. To foster community health and generate awareness, the hospital organises annual programmes like 'Dil Ki Daud' (Race for Heart) and 'Walk for Asthma'.

== Women empowerment ==
Satguru Ram Singh implemented a transformational initiative by administering Amrit (sacred, ambrosial nectar) to women for formal initiation into the Sikh faith. Satguru Ram Singh vehemently opposed the ill practices of child marriage, female infanticide, swapping of spouses, and sale of girls that were prevalent in the Punjab at the time. During that period, British officials had observed that trafficking in women was a lucrative "money-making scheme" in Punjab. Namdhari Guru Ram Singh significantly reduced the cost of marriage and simplified the ceremony. In 1863, he conducted the first basic marriages in the village of Khote by utilising the Gurmat ritual of Anand Karaj. The priestly class, concerned about the potential loss of income due to the introduction of this simple ritual, conveyed the anti-colonial stance of Namdhari Sikhs to the imperial British authorities. Subsequently, Satguru Ram Singh was subjected to house detention for an extended period. Inspired by Satguru Hari Singh, many Namdhari families supported widow remarriage and promoted women's education in Punjabi, giving them equal status in both religious and social spheres. Satguru Jagjit Singh and Satguru Uday Singh has accorded important administrative positions to women. Namdhari women participate in all activities, including Gurbani Kirtan recital using traditional stringed instruments. Joginder Singh mentions a case study where in comparison to a sex ratio of 87.4% in general population, Namdhari community registered a sex ratio of 94.4%, with no instances of female foeticide. Rather, it was reported that Namdhari community honors the birth of a girl child. Joginder Singh attributes this behavior to the teachings of Satguru Ram Singh, who followed the message of Satguru Nanak Dev in this regard.

== Succession ==
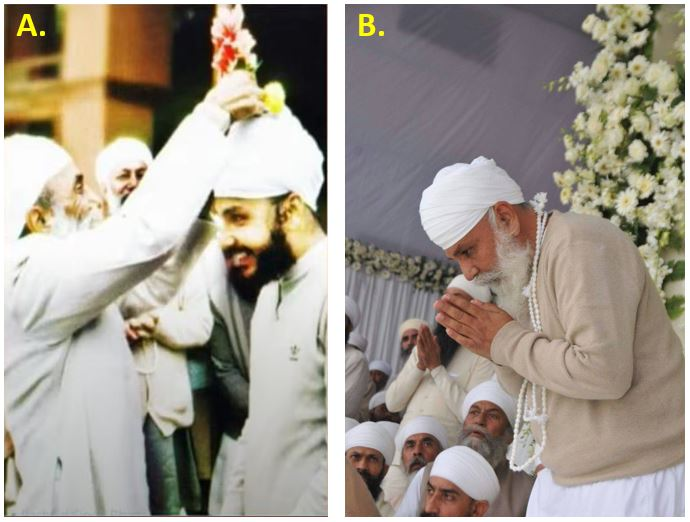
A. Old file photo of Satguru Jagjit Singh with Thakur Uday Singh. B. Thakur Uday Singh assumed the leadership of Namdhari sect as 'Satguru Uday Singh'.

After Satguru Jagjit Singh, Satguru Uday Singh assumed the leadership of Namdhari sect on 22 December 2012 following a Dastarbandi ceremony held at Sri Bhaini sahib. Earlier, he was involved in various developmental works related to Namdhari sect, had established a success story in the form of Namdhari Seeds and had supervised Namdhari sports teams.

In 2019, Satguru Uday Singh along with environmentalist Sant Balbir Singh Seechewal and singer Harbhajan Mann planned restoration of Buddha Nullah through an awareness event titled "Aan Milo Daryao" near the Tajpur Road sewage plant. Satguru Uday Singh was appointed as chairperson of the Buddha Nullah Special Task Force. In 2022, Satguru Uday Singh resigned from the chairpersonship of the STF, citing the slow pace of work and asking the Chief Minister to ensure practical progress for the success of the project.

In 2019, to celebrate the 550th birth anniversary of Satguru Nanak Dev, Satguru Uday Singh organised a grand nagar kirtan with thousands of Namdhari Sikhs traveling to Sultanpur Lodhi to honor this milestone. Over 50,000 Namdhari Sikhs participated, paying their respects at the historic place related to the first Guru.

=== Controversy ===
In 2012, after the death of Satguru Jagjit Singh, there was controversy surrounding who would succeed him as the next Guru. Thakur Uday Singh (nephew of Satguru Jagjit Singh) was announced as the successor. The other faction vying for Thakur Dalip Singh (excommunicated elder brother of Satguru Uday Singh) opposed this. There have been violent clashes between the two factions at different occasions. Satguru Uday Singh was attacked by a person during August 2013 in England, motivated by religious hatred. In 2014, Thakur Dalip Singh was questioned for alleged involvement in a murder case. On 25 December 2015, a bomb exploded in a car, being carried to a spot to target Satguru Uday Singh. Later, Mata Chand Kaur was assassinated in April 2016. Police hinted at the role of foreign elements behind the assassination, and implicated its link with a series of other incidents that were happening in Punjab around that time. The links of the attempted murder in the car bomb case of 2015 led to questioning of Thakur Dalip Singh by Central Bureau of investigation, India. In 2019, CBI arrested the former driver of Thakur Dalip Singh in connection with the assassination of Mata Chand Kaur. Thakur Dalip Singh was reported to have joined investigation on 24 August 2018, but left India without intimation to the investigating agency and without obtaining permission from any competent court/agency to leave the country. CBI issued non-bailable warrants against Thakur Dalip Singh. On 11–12 August 2024, another violent clash happened between the supporters of the two factions in Sirsa district.

== Gurus recognised by Namdhari Sikhs ==
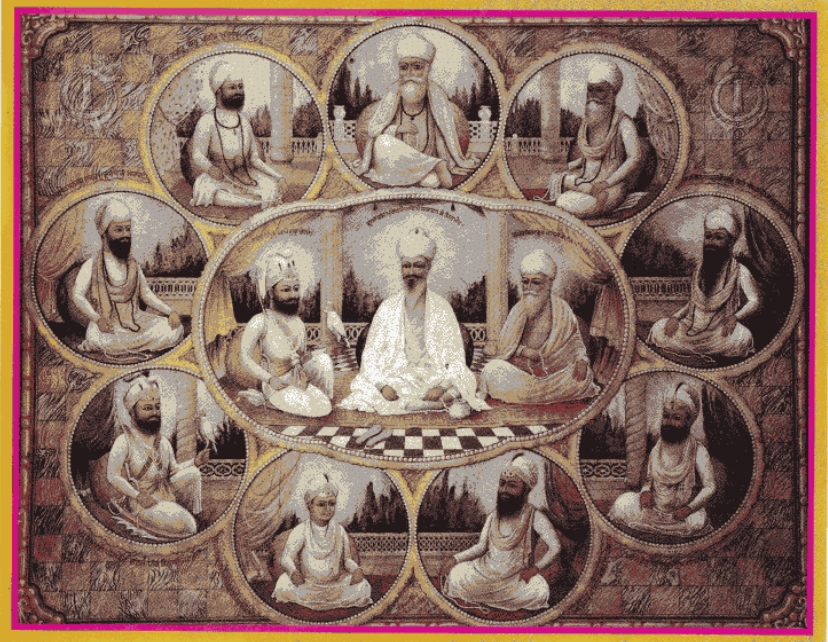
The 12 Gurus in Namdhari Sikhism

A Guru is Sanskrit term for "mentor, guide, expert or master" in a certain field or of certain knowledge. The Namdhari Sikhs equally recognise the first ten Gurus as per the mainstream Sikhism, followed by Satguru Balak Singh and Satguru Ram Singh, whose Guruship period continues, as per their belief. Below are the names of the Gurus followed by Namdhari Sikhs succeeding the mainstream Sikh Gurus:

No.	Name (Birth–Death)	Portrait	Guruship Term	Reference(s)
Succeeding Guru Gobind Singh: (Note: The Namdharis believe in the same lineage of gurus that mainstream Sikhs do, differing in that they believe Balak Singh succeeded Guru Gobind Singh as an 11th guru, a belief which is not shared by mainstream Sikhs. The Namdhari guruship lineage continues til the present-day.)
1.	Guru Balak Singh (1784/1785/1797–1862)		1812–1841	
2.	Guru Ram Singh [1816–1885(disputed), he is still alive according to Namdhari belief]		1841–continuing	
3.	Guru Hari Singh (1819–1906)		1875–1906	
4.	Guru Partap Singh (1889/1890–1959)		1906–1959	
5.	Guru Jagjit Singh (1920–2012)		1959–2012	
6.	Guru Uday Singh		2012–present	
