= Satguru Jagjit Singh =

Spiritual leader of the Namdhari Sikhs

Sri Satguru Jagjit Singh Ji

Guru of the Namdhari Sikhs
- In office 10 September 1959 – 13 December 2012
- Preceded by: Satguru Partap Singh
- Succeeded by: Satguru Uday Singh

Personal life
- Born: 22 November 1920 Sri Bhaini Sahib
- Died: 13 December 2012 (aged 92) Sri Bhaini Sahib
- Spouse: Mata Chand Kaur
- Children: Sahib Kaur
- Parents: Satguru Partap Singh (father); Mata Bhupinder Kaur (mother)

Religious life
- Religion: Namdhari Sikhi

Satguru Jagjit Singh was the spiritual head of the Namdhari Sikhs from 1959 to 2012. Namdhari Sikhi emphasises purity, non-violence and the revival of traditional Sikh practices. Satguru Jagjit Singh led the Namdhari community for over six decades, promoting spiritual discipline, traditional music and environmental conservation.

== Early life ==
Born on 22 November 1920, in Sri Bhaini Sahib, Punjab, India, Satguru Jagjit Singh was the eldest son of Satguru Partap Singh. His earlier name was "Beantji". He was raised in a spiritually rich environment that emphasized Sikh values, closely following the teachings of Guru Nanak and the Sikh Gurus. From an early age, he displayed a keen interest in Gurbani (Sikh scriptures), traditional music, and service to humanity, which would become cornerstones of his life's mission. Satguru Partap Singh himself taught music to Beantji at the age of four. He taught him to play the tunes on stringed instrument Dilruba. Satguru Partap Singh sent him at the age of four and a half years to Ustad Harnam Singh of village Chavinda district Amritsar for learning music. For education of Beantji and other children, Satguru Partap Singh established a Namdhari Vidyalaya (school) at Sri Bhaini Sahib. Satguru Partap Singh brought selected teachers of high skills for the music students. Musicians Ustad Udho Khan Sahib and his son Ustad Rahim Baksh of village Rampur, district Ludhiana near Sri Bhaini Sahib, also used to come to teach deep intricacies of music to the students of Namdhari Vidyalaya. After acquiring of education at the school, Satguru Jagjit Singh used to cooperate in dera (organization) management, including arrangement of rations and participation in different developmental activities.

== Role in refugee rehabilitation post-partition ==
Satguru Partap Singh visited the villages of Western Punjab (now Pakistan) and told the people that "partition of India is imminent; cross over the Ravi, otherwise you would be in difficulty, at least you should move your children and domestic articles immediately". Satguru Partap Singh went himself and sent Satguru Jagjit Singh to many of the places for persuading Sikhs and Hindus to migrate.

Meanwhile, Satguru Partap Singh had already decided to purchase sufficient land in Sirsa area and rehabilitate Namdhari Sikhs there. The purchase of land and the required amount was communicated to all the willing Namdhari Sikhs. Another reason for the purchase of this land was to make the landless tillers as the real owners of lands, because they were till then making their both ends meet by tilling the lands of other Sardars, the ideas was to make them socially and economically independent and improve their living.

After the partition, a large number of Namdhari Sikhs started living in the Sri Jeevan Nagar area. Satguru Jagjit Singh played a major role in their care and distribution of land to them, ensuring their successful and early rehabilitation during those difficult time.

== Spiritual leadership ==
In 1959, Sri Satguru Jagjit Singh succeeded his father, Satguru Partap Singh, as the spiritual leader of the Namdhari Sikhs. His leadership was characterized by a focus on both spiritual upliftment and social reform. Satguru Jagjit Singh urged the Namdhari community to engage in Naam Simran (meditative remembrance of God's name) and Seva (selfless service). Under his guidance, the community emphasized vegetarianism, simplicity in living, and devotion to kirtan (singing of hymns), with Satguru Jagjit Singh himself being instrumental in reviving the use of traditional Sikh instruments like the taus and dilruba. During the overseas visits of Satguru Jagjit Singh, collective 'naam simran', a practice started by Satguru Ram Singh, had been specially emphasized.

Sri Satguru Jagjit Singh ji performed the Sawa Lakh (One Lakh Twenty Five Thousand) Bhogs (conclusions) of the Paths (recitals) of Sri Adi Guru Granth Sahib initiated by Satguru Partap Singh in 1961 at Sri Bhaini Sahib. For the second time, Satguru Jagjit Singh initiated Sawa Lakh Paths in 1972 during the Pardes-Gavan (exile) centenary of Satguru Ram Singh. For the third time, Sawa Lakh Paths were initiated in 1974 at Sri Bhaini Sahib. These Sawa Lakh Paths were completed in March 1997 . The Bhogs of Sawa Lakh Paths of Chandi di Vaar were performed by Satguru Jagjit Singh in 1971 and 1982. Satguru Jagjit Singh had instructed Namdhari Sikhs to take head-to-toe bath daily, it being mandatory at the time of Kirtan and listening of Asa di Vaar.

Satguru Jagjit Singh steered Namdhari community towards the path of pristine Sikhi principles. Saroop Singh Alag mentions the respect to kes (hair) exemplified by Satguru Jagjit Singh. On 16 July 1991, Satguru Jagjit Singh underwent bypass surgery of heart at the age of 71 years in Royal Adelaide Hospital, Australia with the conditions that no part of his body hair be cut, his dastar be always on his head at all times, and that he not be administered any alcohol-based sedatives. Australian newspapers 'Telegraph Mirror' and 'The news' reported this incident, highlighting the respect accorded to hair in the Sikhi tradition.

== Gurbani kirtan and Indian classical music ==
Satguru Jagjit Singh took a deep interest in preserving Sikh culture, particularly through music. He was pivotal in reviving the traditional Namdhari style of kirtan, which follows the classical raagas as prescribed in the Guru Granth Sahib. His contributions ensured the preservation of traditional Sikh instruments, such as the taus and saranda, which were at risk of being forgotten. A documentary further traces their musical legacy in Bhaini Sahib, Punjab.

Satguru Jagjit Singh initiated efforts to train youth in stringed instruments, which had been used traditionally by Sikh Gurus for Gurbani kirtan. A Kala Kendra was established at Sri Bhaini Sahib to promote both vocal and instrumental music under the guidance of eminent musicians. Students as young as five years were trained in classical music under supervision of Satugru Jagjit Singh. With his patronage, many music schools have flourished in India, including those in Delhi, Jalandhar, Amritsar, Mandi (Himachal Pradesh), and Jammu, dedicated to teaching music to children.

Satguru Jagjit Singh also made special arrangements with world-famous Indian classical musicians to mentor these children. Many talented young Namdhari artists received instruction from internationally reputed musicians such as Ustad Vilayat Khan, Ustad Amjad Ali Khan, Pandit Shanta Prasad, Pandit Krishan Maharaj, Pandit Shiv Kumar, and Pandit Hari Prasad Chaurasia.

These and other renowned classical musicians, including Ustad Umeed Ali Khan, Ustad Bismillah Khan, Shri Kumar Gandharava, Swami Pagal Das, Pandit Ram Narayan, Pandit Ravi Shankar, Ustad Allah Rakha, Singh Bandhu, and Ustad Zakir Hussain, have had the honor of participating in Namdhari Sangeet festivals.

On 14 April 2013, The Sangeet Natak Akademi honored Satguru Jagjit Singh with the prestigious Sangeet Natak Academy Tagore Rattan Award for his contributions in the field of Music. The Namdhari commitment to music as a medium for spiritual expression continues to enrich the cultural landscape of India. In 2019, a documentary "Sangeet Saroop Satguru" was released, which highlighted the contributions of Satguru Jagjit Singh in the field of Indian classical music and his efforts in bringing all the maestros at one place for taking this abstract art to the next generation.

== Fostering agricultural development ==
Concomitant with rehabilitation of Sikhs in Sri Jeewan Nagar area post-independence, Satugru Jagjit Singh made efforts to ensure self-sufficiency of the population there. He continued the efforts of cattle improvement initiated by Satguru Partap Singh. For his work on cattle preservation, Satguru Jagjit Singh was awarded the honor ‘Gopal Rattan’ award by Gau-Govardhan Sammiti in 1965. Besides, Satguru Jagjit Singh started a new wave of advanced farming in Namdhari community. He started his efforts with the area of Sri Jeewan Nagar and taking Sikhs along with him, he brought four hundred acres infertile land of Mastangarh into cultivation.

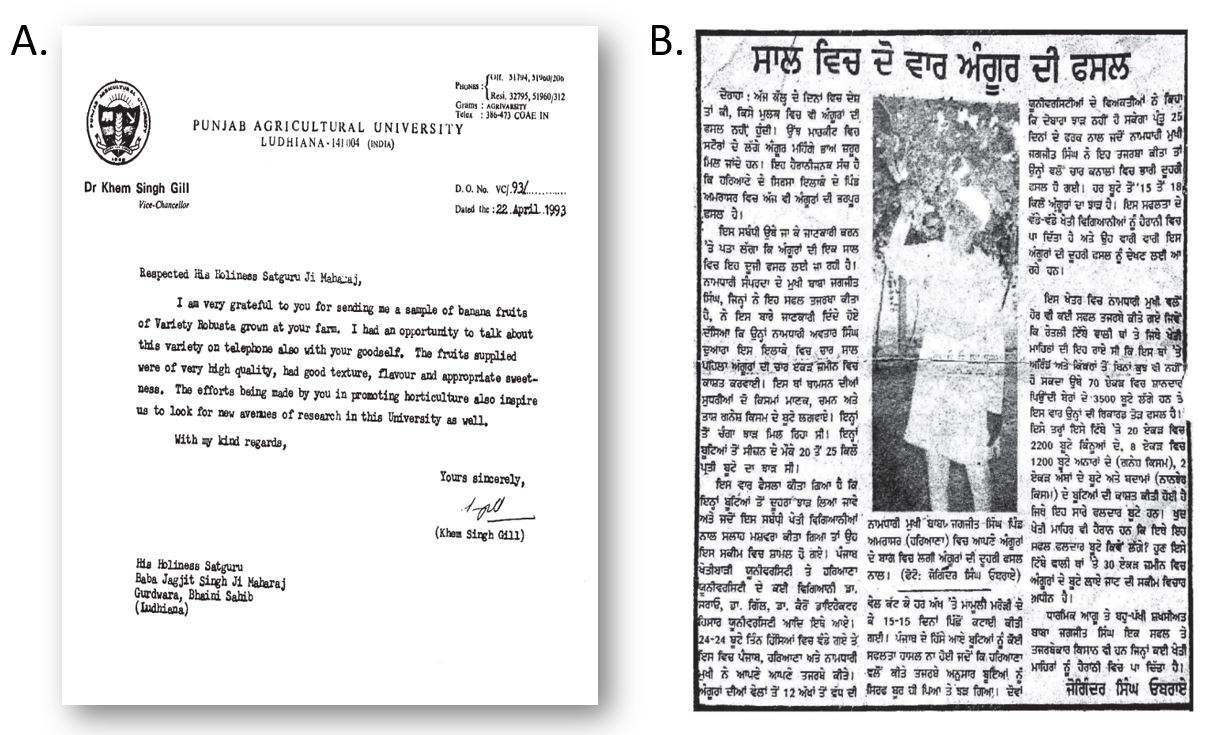
Appreciation of Satguru Jagjit Singh's efforts in horticulture by (A) VC, Punjab Agriculture University, and (B) regional newspaper

Way back in 1962, Satguru Jagjit Singh encouraged the Sikhs to grow horticultural crops on their land, a time much earlier than the commencement of major horticultural missions in the country. He advised Sikhs to get 'more output from land', instead of vouching for 'more land without productivity'. He emphasized on increasing productivity rather than area. In his holy sermons also, he gave farming advice with information of finances required and remuneration to be expected from growing particular fruit crops. Additionally, he himself supervised cultivation of crops and setting of farms before advising the farmers. At many occasions, he held consultations with experts and disseminated the knowledge to farmers. In 1974–75, Satguru Ji has constituted a five-member committee, which used to guide farmers regarding various agricultural avenues. The successful models were then replicated in other areas.

Satguru Jagjit Singh had been a keen horticulturist. He successfully demonstrated off-season crop of grapes as a new avenue for farmers, amongst other endeavors. This success story was also covered by newspapers and in university reports. Dr. Gill expressed remarked about Satguru Jagjit Singh, ‘The efforts made by you in promoting horticulture also inspire us to look for new avenues of research in this university as well’.

== Emphasis on social and environmental reform ==
Satguru Jagjit Singh was deeply committed to environmental stewardship and social responsibility. He encouraged sustainable living practices such as tree plantation drives, judicious farming and the responsible use of natural resources. He advocated for a harmonious relationship between humanity and nature, stressing the spiritual and practical importance of environmental conservation. Tatla mentions that "on a practical plane, only the Namdhari sect, members of which adhere to strict vegetarianism and homespun clothes, are dedicated to conserving the 'mother planet' for all".

Satguru Jagjit Singh was also known for promoting peace and non-violence globally. His teachings of non-violence influenced many within and outside the Namdhari community, aligning with their commitment to peaceful coexistence and justice. Satguru Jagjit Singh was an "important guest" at 23rd World Vegetarian Congress conducted by International Vegetarian Union in 1975. He had been an invited dignitary in other vegetarian conferences also.

== Contributions to education and cultural preservation ==
Education was a cornerstone of Satguru Ji's efforts to uplift society. He established many educational institutions where students were taught both spiritual and secular knowledge. These schools emphasized moral values and academic excellence, reflecting Satguru Ji's belief in the holistic development of the individual. Namdhari community had not participated in the colonial education system due to the principles of non-cooperation and boycott of foreign infrastructure during the pre-independence times. After independence, Satguru Jagjit Singh endeavored to raise the educational standards of Namdhari youth, while remaining within the ambit of Sikhi principles. In 1964–65, he established an organization called Sarab Hind Namdhari Vidyak Sanstha (All India Namdhari Educational Organization) with the objectives of uniting educated Namdhari youth, protecting them from the adverse effects of Western culture, and providing need-based education to enhance their personalities and future prospects. This organization held annual meetings, offering Namdhari youth a platform to share views, interact, resolve doubts, and interact directly with Satguru himself. Initially aimed at young men, the organization was renamed in 1965 to include young women under the Vishwa Namdhari Vidyak Jatha (Women's Wing) in 1981. This women's wing strives to promote a lifestyle distanced from fashion trends, discourage dowry practices, and preserve the cultural heritage of their community and state.

Satguru Jagjit Singh provided a new dimension to marriages amongst Namdhari Sikhs. He completely banned dowry, and in the events organized by Namdhari Vidyak Jathas, many youngsters were given a pledge not to take or give dowry during their marriages. To commemorate the initiation of the first Anand Karaj ceremonies in Sikh tradition—established in 1863 by Satguru Ram Singh in Khote village with the recitation of four laavans followed by Anand Sahib—Satguru Jagjit Singh organized a mass wedding of 149 Namdhari couples on June 24, 1964, marking the 100th anniversary of this tradition. According to the practice established, the parents, in consultation with local leaders or trusted individuals, propose a boy or girl for marriage. They complete a form created by the Vishav Namdhari Sangat at Sri Bhaini Sahib, which includes details such as names, occupations, and gotra (exogamous caste groups) of the boy's and girl's paternal and maternal families, along with their birthdates, heights, and qualifications. The parents affirm that no dowry has been exchanged and that they are abiding by Satguru's commands. The Vishav Namdhari Sangat verifies that both the boy and girl meet the required age, possess a gurmukh appearance, and are able to recite ardas. They also ensure that the families are not closely related. Additionally, a Suba and two responsible persons confirm these details. Before the anand-riti ceremony, the parents perform sehaj paths (recitation of the Sri Adi Guru Granth Sahib) either in their homes or at Sri Bhaini Sahib. This way, the Namdhari Anand marriages stand out as an exception to an otherwise extravagant wedding culture of North India, which has been flagged as a social menace by many.

== Encouragement to sports ==
A hallmark of an ideal modern society is the absence of addiction to narcotics, alcohol, or any other intoxicants. To inspire young people to lead healthier lives, Satguru Jagjit Singh and Satguru Uday Singh have extensively promoted sports. The Namdhari Sports Academy, based in Sirsa, Haryana, has nurtured several hockey players who have represented the Indian National Hockey Team. Notable players include Harpal Singh, Sardara Singh (former Indian team captain), Jasbir Singh, Sher Singh, Gurwinder Singh, Gurcharan Singh, Karamjit Singh, Avtar Singh, Anmol Singh, Harwinder Singh, Savinder Singh, and Harjinder Singh. The Namdhari Sports Academy, affiliated with the Indian Hockey Federation, was the first in India to install an AstroTurf field at Sri Bhaini Sahib to enhance training quality. The academy's teams actively compete in the national championships across Sub Junior, Junior, and Senior levels, with "Namdhari XI" becoming widely recognized in Indian hockey for their impressive achievements, especially during the 1980s to 2000s. Satguru Uday Singh is the patron of the Namdhari Hockey Team.

== Interfaith dialogue and global outreach ==
Satguru Jagjit Singh was an ardent supporter of interfaith dialogue and understanding, meeting with religious leaders, statesmen, and global influencers to promote peace and unity. He believed that mutual respect and cooperation between different faiths were crucial to fostering global harmony. Satguru's humanitarian efforts extended beyond the Namdhari community, as they worked to bridge divides between religions and encourage collective efforts in addressing social issues. Satguru Jagjit Singh steered the Namdhari community through many phases of the late twentieth century. Joginder Singh mentions that since the inception, Namdhari sect had been a supporter of Punjabi language in Gurmukhi script and Punjabiat (cultural plurality). At the same time, Namdhari sect has been an ardent advocate of a unified India. Satugru Jagjit Singh made an appeal to the Hindus that they should recognize Punjabi language as their mother tongue. He told the Hindus that he appreciated the relevance of Hindi language and reminded the Hindus and Sikhs that they belonged to the same nationality, and advised them to resolve the linguistic issue amicably. Satguru Jagjit Singh encouraged all parties in various state- and center- based conflicts to resolve issues mutually and amicably.

Tatla mentions the way in which influential figures like Satguru Jagjit Singh 'brought standards of social and religious judgement among overseas Sikh communities much closer to the Punjabi society'. During his visit to UK, Satguru Jagjit Singh messaged the then British Prime Minister Tony Blair 'to take care and be mindful that innocent people do not suffer or lose their lives' when making important decisions related to wars. In 1969, Satguru Jagjit Singh attended the World Religion Conference in Japan. In a discussion on comparative religions held at University of Tokyo, the students asked, 'What is the religion that is common to all?' Replying to this, Satguru Jagjit Singh quoted a reference from Gurbani, "ਬੋਲੀਐ ਸਚੁ ਧਰਮੁ ਝੂਠੁ ਨ ਬੋਲੀਐ ॥ (SGGS p.488): Always speak the truth - and never speak lies'. Satguru further added, "Being truthful is the common goal of all religions, even atheitsts can adopt this. If all of us follow this religion, peace would reign supreme in the world". On 7 December 1999, Satguru Jagjit Singh delivered his address in the World Parliament of Religions, Cape Town. He remarked that 'all humans need to do Naam Simran to attain their real spiritual needs' and that the spiritual well-being deserves the same care and attention we give to our material possessions.

== Legacy ==
Satguru Jagjit Singh died on 13 December 2012, leaving a legacy marked by spiritual guidance, social reform, and environmental advocacy. Namdhari community worldwide observes 13 December as the 'Naam Simran Day' in remembrance of Satguru Jagjit Singh. His successor, Satguru Dalip Singh, continues to lead the Namdhari Sikh community with the same dedication to Sikh principles. Satguru Uday Singh started an annual music festival held in November to commemorate the contributions of Satguru Jagjit Singh in the field of Indian classical music. The 1st Sri Satguru Jagjit Singh Sangeet Sammellan was held in 2013. This annual event has hosted many legendary musicians of both Hindustani and Carnatic styles of Indian music, like Pandit Ajoy Chakraborty, Pandit Shiv Kumar Sharma, Ustad Zakir Hussain, Ustad Amjad Ali Khan, Ustad Shahid Pervez, Pandit Yogesh Samsi and other stalwarts. Similar events have been variously hosted at Delhi and Bangalore. In 2022, Satguru Uday Singh started an all-India Satguru Jagjit Singh Shastriya Sangeet Pratiyogita (classical music competition) in junior and senior categories.

Satguru's contributions to Sikh music, cultural preservation, environmental awareness, and global peace remain influential today, and their teachings continue to inspire people worldwide to live with humility, compassion, and devotion to the divine.
