= Satguru Partap Singh =

Spiritual leader of the Namdhari Sikhs

Sri Satguru Partap Singh Ji
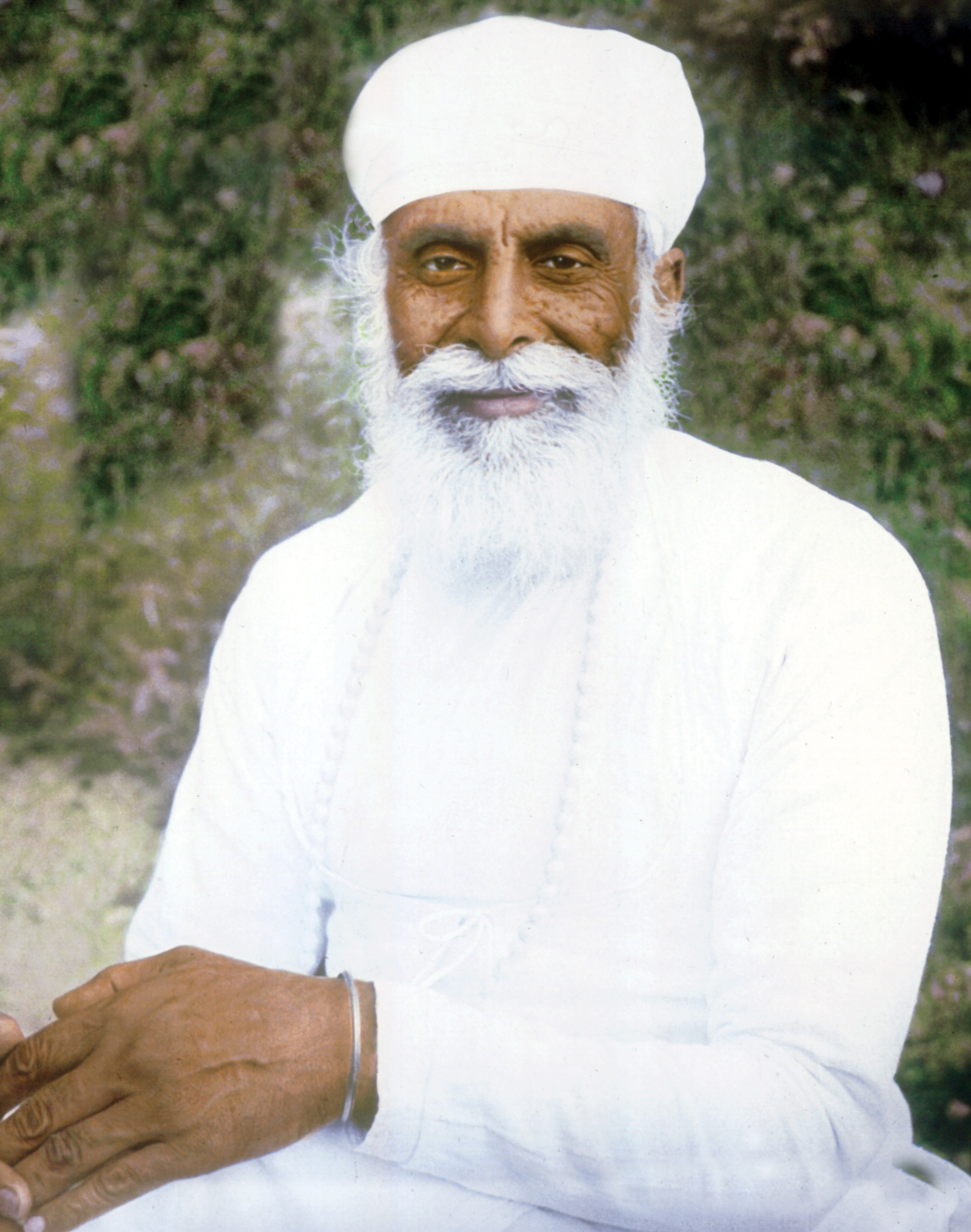
- Preceded by: Satguru Hari Singh
- Succeeded by: Satguru Jagjit Singh

Personal life
- Born: 9 March 1889 Sri Bhaini Sahib
- Died: 21 August 1959 (aged 70) Sri Bhaini Sahib
- Spouse: Mata Bhupinder Kaur
- Children: Satguru Jagjit Singh and Maharaj Bir Singh
- Parents: Satguru Hari Singh (father); Mata Jeewan Kaur (mother)

Religious life
- Religion: Namdhari Sikhi

Satguru Partap Singh (1882–1959) served as the spiritual head of the Namdhari Sikhs from 1906 to 1959. (Note: His personal name is alternatively spelt as 'Pratap'.) He was a staunch advocate for Sikh unity and the preservation of religious traditions. He organized the 'Guru Nanak Sarav Sampardai Conference' in 1934, bringing together various Sikh factions to promote harmony and mutual respect. Under his guidance, the practice of singing Gurbani in its original Ragas (melodies) got highly encouraged, and he established the Namdhari Vidyalaya (school) to nurture young musical talent and preserve Indic traditions.

His tenure as the head of the sect spanned significant historical events in India, and he was instrumental in fostering community well-being and cultural preservation.

== Early life ==
Satguru Partap Singh was born in 1882 in the village of Sri Bhaini Sahib. At an early age, he learned Gurmukhi alphabet, correct pronunciation of Gurbani and Gurbani compositions like Sukhmani, Akal Ustat and Bachittar Natak, among others. He learnt Hanuman Natak, Hitopadesh and basic Persian and a few words of English. He learnt playing the traditional stringed instrument Taus from Mastan Singh.

He also learned preparing Ayurvedic formulations and remedies, along with traditional diagnosis of ailments of humans and animals.

== Spiritual leadership ==
In 1906, due to the passing of Satguru Hari Singh, Satguru Partap Singh assumed the leadership of the Namdhari community. Within a week, the police post set up at Sri Bhaini Sahib 34 years earlier in 1872, was relocated from proximity of Satguru's residence and transferred to a distant corner. For some years, Satguru Partap Singh engaged in strict routine of meditation. In 1907, Satguru Partap Singh supervised the Holla Mahalla festival of Namdhari community at Naushehra. He emphasized the importance of simplicity, devotion, and ethical living in accordance with Sikh principles. Thereafter, he supervised 53 such congregations till 1959. In 1919, Mata Bhupinder Kaur, the spouse of Satguru Partap Singh requested his permission to allow women to take part in the Jap Prayog (one-month rigorous Naam simran practice). This was granted and all women joined Mata Ji for this annual event. Since then women have always taken an equal part in the Jap Prayogs. In 1920, 'Satjug' newspaper was started to keep Namdhari Sikhs updated about the community activities and the news. In the 1921 Holla Mahalla at Muktasar, Satguru Partap Singh established "Namdhari Darbar" for formal communications with different organizations. In the years 1950 and 1958, Holla festival was observed overseas in Bangkok (Thailand) and Kampala (Uganda).

=== Efforts for unity ===
Satguru Partap Singh advocated mutual respect among all communities. He prohibited Namdhari Sikhs from criticizing other faiths, while asking them to be steadfast in their practices.

To bring different Sikh sects onto one platform, Satguru Partap Singh organized “Guru Nanak Sarv Sampradaya”in 1934 at Sri Bhaini Sahib. Its aim was to unite all who believed in or followed the teachings of Guru Nanak. The conference was attended by various Sikh sects, including Akali, Nirmala, Udasi, Seva Panthi, Nihang, Sahajdari, Adanshahi etc. Khalsa Diwan, Shiromani Gurdwara Parbandhak Committee, Shiromani Akali Dal, Udasi Mahamandal, Nirmal Mahamandal also attended the event and resolved to address any issues amicably. The President of this conference was Bhai Arjan Singh Ji Bagria. It was attended by eminent personalities of Sikh Panth, including Sunder Singh Majithia, Principal Jodh Singh and Bhai Kahn Singh Nabha. The main agenda of this conference was to create harmony and unity amongst all sects of Sikhs, who believed in Satguru Nanak Dev and in the doctrines of the Holy Sri Adi Guru Granth Sahib and the Holy Sri Dasam Granth.

The resolutions passed in this conference urged the Sikh sects to prioritize the preaching of Gurbani within their groups and emphasized that all religious figures, including preachers, missionaries, musicians, editors, and leaders, should engage solely in constructive actions. It called on the Shiromani Gurdwara Parbandhak Committee, local Gurdwara management committees, and other Sikh societies to appoint the most qualified individuals from relevant sects to positions such as Granthi or preacher, with special consideration for the sect previously managing a given Gurdwara before it was taken over. Lastly, it emphasized promotion of unity and avoiding unnecessary legal issues.

Recognizing his contributions in fostering unity among different sects, the contemporary leader of the Sikhs, Master Tara Singh desired Satguru Partap Singh to mediate between the warring factions within the Akalis, but much progress in this directions couldn't be achieved due to mistrust of Master Tara Singh with others, including Giani Sher Singh. Nevertheless, Grewal mentions that Master Tara Singh "appreciated the sagacity of 'Baba Partap Singh Ji' who tackled all the delicate situations in an appropriate manner...Master Tara Singh appreciated the efforts made by Baba Partap Singh to bring the Akalis, the Namdharis, the Udasis, and the Nirmalas together."

In 1943, Satguru Partap Singh organized a Hindu-Sikh unity conference in Sri Bhaini Sahib, stressing the importance of unity among Hindus and Sikhs. Thereafter, a Hindu-Sikh-Muslim conference was organized to bring all sections of society for peaceful co-existence and to face the challenge of imperialism with renewed vigor.

=== Revival of traditional styles of devotional music ===
Satguru Partap Singh received music education, including playing the stringed instrument Taus under the tutelage of Ustad Mastan Singh, who was a musician at the Patiala royal court. Satguru Partap Singh appointed Ustad Udho Khan of the Talwandi gharana and his son Ustad Rahim Baksh to train 16-18 young kids at the Namdhari school in Sri Bhaini Sahib. Many Rababis (traditional instrumentalis) like Bhai Dittu, Bhai Fakiriya, Bhai Kaloo, Bhai Taaba, Bhai Sunder, Bhai Sandal and others received support under the patronage of Satguru Partap Singh. He revived the practice of traditional styles of Sikh devotional music (Gurmat kirtan) in the morning and afternoon sessions of meditation.

Satguru Partap Singh stressed the importance of correct pronunciation of Gurbani, along with proper maintenance of Raga melodies and taal rhythms. In 1933, he organized a three-day Gurmat Sangeet Sammellan (devotional music conference) in Sri Bhaini Sahib. For the competition, different teams were told to recite the Gurbani Shabad in the same Raga in which it was composed by the Guru Sahibs, sing the Shabads in Dhrupad (an elaborate melodic development) style and maintain correct pronunciation and rhythm. Among the judges were Bhai Kahn Singh Nabha, S. Mukand Singh and others. In 1942, Satguru Partap Singh organized a special meeting of Rababis with a view to preserve and propagate traditional singing genres of Gurbani kirtan. Many prominent contemporary Rababis attended this, which included Bhai Moti, Bhai Desa, Bhai Haider, Bhai Abdul Haq, Bhai Inayat, Bhai Naseer, amongst others. Commenting on the contributions of Satguru Partap Singh, the then lead Raagi of Gurudwara Sees Ganj, Bhai Gurcharan Singh Kanwal remarked, "Similar to how the ten Gurus accorded importance to kirtan (devotional singing), the Namdhari community accords it a great value. Since its inception, the Namdhari community has considered devotional music as a form of meditation...Most respected Maharaj baba Partap Singh worked towards preserving the distinct style of Gurmat kirtan, which had been continuing from the times of Guru Sahiban".

Besides, Satguru Partap Singh facilitated stalwarts of Indian classical music like Pt. Vishnu Digambar, Pt. Omkar Nath Thakur, Sri Krishna Rao Pandit, Ustad Gulam Ali Khan. Maulvi Fazal Muhammad, who used to skillfully craft musical instruments for the students, received Satguru's patronage and was specially visited by Satguru Jagjit Singh in Pakistan, during his final days.

=== Preservation of the Anand karaj ritual ===
Satguru Partap Singh utilized the occasion of congregations of Sangat to introduce principles of Gurmat and discourage various backward practices that had crept into general society. He prohibited extravagant showcasing during marriages. Though the relations of the Namdhari community had gone sour with the general society, which had supported the colonial government in the persecution of Namdhari Sikhs, yet Satguru Partap Singh lent support to the cause of the legalization of Anand maryada (Sikh code of marriages) during 1909. Maharajas of Patiala and Nabha were instrumental in bringing this issue to the Imperial Council. Satguru Partap Singh gave a statement, ''We, the Namdhari Panth and the Kookas, have been following the Anand Maryada, till now, 45 years since then (the initiation of Anand Maryada by Satguru Ram Singh in 1863)''. While the Namdhari community had been practicing this ritual and did not require the colonial government's authorization for it, it participated in the campaign taken up by Singh Sabhas for the legalization of Anand marriages for its benefits to the general Sikh society.

The supporters of the Anand marriage bill mentioned that Namdhari Sikhs have 'always' followed the Anand marriages, the opposers argued that among the Sikhs, 'only' the Namdhari Sikhs and Nihangs follow this system, while many other Sikhs followed Hindu rituals like 'Chaddar Andazi, Got Kunala, and in some cases, no ritual at all'. Sirdar Arur Singh, Manager of Golden Temple, in his representation opposing the Bill mentioned, ''Even the Singh Sabha people solemnize their marriages according to the custom in vogue. Very few of them resort to the new ceremony (referring to the proposed Anand karaj ritual) of their own..''.

Panesar mentions that in order to cite evidence for the existence of the Anand ritual among Sikhs, the statement of support by Satguru Partap Singh was required and it was duly accorded. Satguru Partap Singh strictly enforced the practice of Anand karaj for marriages within the Namdhari community, ensuring its 'sanctity'. He disapproved of sending sweets to the in-laws of his younger brother Maharaj Nihal Singh during his marriage, sending a message that the 'instruction by Satguru Ram Singh of maintaining simplicity in marriages' is identical for one and all.

== Role in the Indian independence movement ==
During India's struggle for independence, Satguru Partap Singh actively supported the nationalist movement. Gill mentions that in 1914, when a portion of the boundary wall of Gurudwara Rakab Gunj was demolished by the British Government to straighten a passage to viceregal building, Mangal Singh, a Namdhari Sikh, catalyzed Akalis to raise their voice in opposition of the colonial government. Master Tara Singh acknowledged the role played by Satguru Partap Singh in motivating Sikhs to unite for a common cause during this time. The colonial government tried to drive a wedge between Namdharis and Akalis at multiple occasions and sought the support of Namdhari community for First World War efforts, but Satguru Partap Singh always denied any concession to the colonial government and staunchly maintained the anti-colonial nature of the Namdhari movement.

Joginder Singh mentions that Satguru Partap Singh 'asserted that there was no compatibility of relationship between the Kuka Sikhs and the (colonial) government. He disclosed that during the First World War, the Deputy Commissioner (Ludhiana) approached him and asked to provide recruits which he declined on the ground that he and his followers were not allies of the government.'

Namdhari Sikhs had established rapport with nationalists like Kitchleu and Satyal, both prominent leaders of Amritsar. Deputy Commissioner of Ludhiana, Asgar Ali summoned Namdhari Sikhs to his office an 'warned them of the serious consequences if they did not stop their anti-British activities'. The colonial British government 'used force as well as pursuation' to stop Namdhari Sikhs from participating in the nationalist movements. Joginder Singh mentions that 'undeterred by the British tactics, second generation of the Namdharis began to join national mainstream and responded to the Non-cooperation movement with zeal. They themselves claimed to be the original harbingers of this movement.'

He participated in the 1929 Lahore Congress Session, providing logistical support and encouraging Namdhari participation. The logistics of this program, especially langar (food) were organized by the Namdhari community. In the 1945 Wavell Conference, he offered unconditional support to the Congress party's freedom struggle. He consistently maintained a policy of non-cooperation with the British government. In the 1959 edition of 'Preetlarhi' magazine, Gurbaksh Singh remarked, "Mahara Partap Singh will be counted as exceptional for his great contribution in maintaining the anti-colonial nature of his religious organization'.

== Humanitarian efforts ==
Satguru Partap Singh was known for his humanitarian work. He distributed land to landless farmers and provided aid to those in need. During the partition of India in 1947, he foresaw the impending crisis and helped many people relocate to safer areas. He offered support to victims of natural disasters in various parts of India. Joginder Singh mentions that a substantial number of Namdhari Sikhs benefited from the advance caution regarding the likely volatile situation 'informed' by Satguru Partap Singh, due to which 'these agriculturists believe that they escaped violence since they followed their guru's advice'. However, there was a second category of Namdhari Sikhs who could not migrate earlier and were caught up by 'marauding columns of anti-social elements'. In addition, 'there were exceptional families that escaped unhurt and did not lose members, or whose women were not assaulted'.

Satguru Partap Singh had purchased a large tract of barren land at low cost near Hissar and named it Sri Jeewan Nagar. All the timely efforts resulted in accelerated allotment of refugees. Under the guidance of Satguru Partap Singh and Satguru Jagjit Singh, community farming was practiced in Sri Jeewan Nagar for three years to cope with the difficult times.

Comrade Sohan Singh Josh remarked, "In the days of 1946-47 Hindu-Muslim riots, either Kuka Sikhs under the leadership of Maharaj Partap Singh or the communists did not let the feelings of fanaticism overcome their conscience. Even big leaders came under the wave of fanaticism and they participated in communal riots...Punjabis should be as much proud of this steadfastness of Maharaj (Satguru Partap Singh) as possible".

Apart from settlement of refugees, Satguru Partap Singh made efforts for their meaningful rehabilitation. Recognizing the immense work done by Satguru Partap Singh in improving breeds of cows and buffaloes, he was appointed a member of an eleven-member ‘Cattle Preservation Committee’ by Government of India. He started ‘Sri Satguru Hari Singh Animal Breeding and Agricultural Farm’ at Sri Jeewan Nagar to speed up breeding activities on scientific principles. He established the dysfunctional Skinnery water stream to ensure irrigation and introduced tractors in the area. The religious congregations of Namdhari Sikhs were used as a means to disseminate information on scientific ways of animal husbandry and dairying.

== Legacy ==
Satguru Partap Singh died on 21 August 1959. His leadership and guidance left a lasting impact on the Namdhari community. His contributions to the institutionalization of Namdhari practices continue to inspire his followers worldwide. In 1959, Satguru Jagjit Singh assumed the leadership of the Namdhari community and carried forward the work of refugee rehabilitation and cultural preservation.
