= Satguru Balak Singh =

Spiritual leader of the Namdhari Sikhs

Baba, Guru Balak Singh Ji
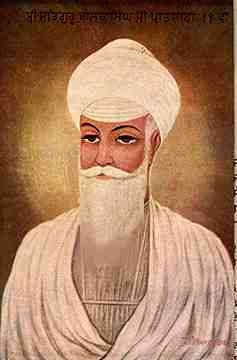

Guru of the Namdharis
- In office 1812–1841
- Preceded by: None (position established) or Guru Gobind Singh (according to Namdhari belief)
- Succeeded by: Guru Ram Singh
- Title: Eleventh Guru of the Namdhari Sikhs

Personal life
- Born: Balak Singh Batra; Disputed date of birth Chhoī, Punjab (located in present-day Attock district, Rawalpindi division, Pakistan)
- Died: 6 December 1862 Hazron village
- Spouse: Mata Totti
- Parents: Dayal Singh Batra (father); Mata Bhag Bhari (mother)

Religious life
- Religion: Sikhism
- Sect: Namdhari

Religious career
- Based in: Hazron village

Namdhari Guru Balak Singh (disputed (Note: Some sources give his birth year as either 1784, 1785, or 1797.) – 1862), was an Indian Sikh religious leader who taught the principles of Sikhi in Attock area and whose successor, Satguru Ram Singh, founded the Namdhari (Kuka) sect. Balak is described as more of a forerunner rather than as a founder of the Namdhari sect.

== Birthdate ==
His date of birth is in-dispute amongst sources. Dharam Singh gives a year of birth of 1785 whilst the Encyclopædia Britannica gives a date of 1797.

== Biography ==
=== Early life ===
He was born into a Batra Arora family in the village of Chhoī (located in present-day Attock district, Rawalpindi division, Pakistan) to parents Dial Singh and Mata Bhag Bhari. He had a brother named Manna Singh. At a young age, he worked in the family business as a supplier of provisions to the Hazro Fort's garrison. The Hazro Fort was located near his childhood home. When he came of age, he was wed to Mai Toti. After this point, little biographical details on his life survives but what is known is that he lived as a spiritually-inclined man who became greatly influenced by Bhagat Jawahar Mal of the local area of Hazro. In the year 1854, Guru Balak Singh was visited by Baba Jaimal Singh, who later founded Radhasoami Satsang. Baba Jaimal Singh enquired Guru Balak Singh about the Panch Shabad spoken of by Kabir, to which Guru Balak Singh is reported to have replied, 'We only recite the four-letter Naam given by Guru Nanak.' Hindus, Muslims and Sikhs of the area highly regarded Guru Balak Singh.

=== Spiritual career begins ===
Eventually, he had come to possess his own group of followers. He invoked the authority of Sikh scriptures and emphasized the importance of the name (naam) for salvation. The account of Namdhari Guru Balak Singh was first given by the Sikh scholar Giani Gian Singh, writer of the famed Panth Prakash. In village Hazron, Guru Balak Singh had set up a shop. He earned his living by simple labor and delivered spiritual message to the people. Soon, the village became an important place for the seekers of spiritual wisdom and the curious devotees came to Hazron to receive the spiritual tutelage of Guru Balak Singh.

Guru Balak Singh constructed a meeting place located in Hazro where he and his followers would convene, it is here where he would first come into contact with his future successor, Ram Singh.

=== Claimed meeting with Guru Gobind Singh ===
Namdhari Sikhs believe he was the successor of Guru Gobind Singh, a stance that differs them from mainstream Sikhism. According to Namdharis, Guru Gobind Singh did not die from the wounds inflicted by the assassination attempt on his life in 1708, but instead live-on as a recluse under the pseudonym of "Ajapal Singh", passing on the guruship to Balak Singh before his death. Namdharis believe Guru Gobind Singh lived to the ripe-old age of 146 when he died in the year 1812, long enough to be contemporary with Namdhari Guru Balak Singh and pass on the Guruship to him.

=== Meeting with Ram Singh and later life ===
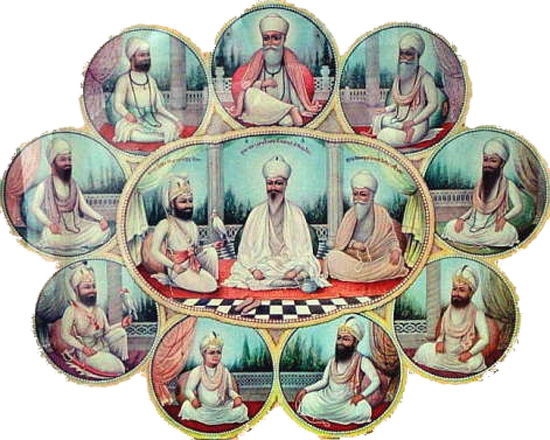
Painting of twelve gurus of the Namdhari sect of Sikhism, including the ten mainstream Sikh gurus, plus Balak Singh and Ram Singh, circa late-19th century

In the year circa 1841, Namdhari Guru Ram Singh, while serving in the Naunihal Regiment of Sikh army and on tour of Lahore to collect royal coffers, met Guru Balak Singh in Hazron. Ram Singh had been assigned to the garrison of Hazro, which provided the chance meeting between the two. Guru Balak Singh was overjoyed to see Ram Singh and according to folklore told him: "I had been waiting for you." He told Guru Ram Singh that he was the next in line to him.

After meeting the young Ram Singh, Guru Balak Singh decided to take him under his wing as his disciple and taught him about the Sikh gurus, Sikh heroes, and the Khalsa Panth.

In approximately 1860, having moved south with his garrison, Ram Singh would meet with his mentor, Balak Singh, and request to take the reins as a spiritual preacher of his master's doctrine, a request which Balak Singh granted.

Guru Balak Singh gave Ram Singh "Patasha" (sugar bubbles), a coconut, five paise coins and took five rounds around him in reverence and bowed before him, making him his successor.

Namdhari Guru Ram Singh, after leaving the service of army, came back and performed different activities. In 1857, Guru Ram Singh started the Namdhari movement and made Sri Bhaini Sahib as the headquarters for his mission.

Namdhari Guru Balak Singh stayed in Hazron, and carried on his work of spiritual upliftment of the people. He died on 6 December 1862.

== Teachings ==
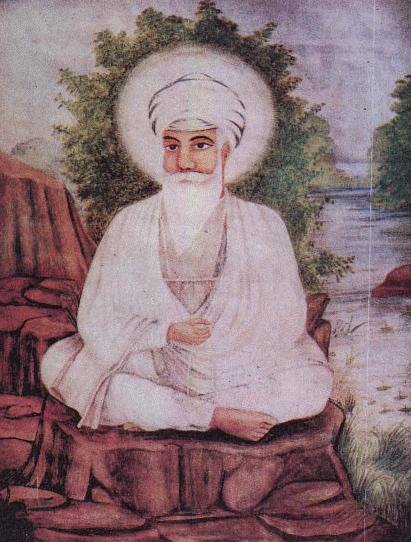
Painting of Balak Singh sitting cross-legged on rock

Guru Balak Singh emphasized being in a continual state of meditation in-remembrance of the Transcendental Reality. He further stipulated to his followers to bathe at-least three times per day, emphasizing cleanliness. Another teaching was the disavowal of using a leather bucket for water, since cows are held in high-regard. He taught the importance of the Anand marriage ceremony. He asked his followers to offer a sacrement of karah prashad worth one and a quarter rupees per month. He instructed his followers to not eat any food cooked by an individual who was not a Sikh.

Prohibitions included the giving of dowry, consuming alcohol, and the eating of meat. Characteristics that were praised were truthfulness and honest labour.

Guru Balak Singh, had merely stressed upon the importance of chanting God's name as the only righteous religious ritual. Ram Singh however would introduce many new elements into the orthodoxy and orthopraxy of the sect.

== Prominent disciples ==
- Guru Ram Singh, his successor.
- Kahn Singh, his nephew (son of Manna Singh). He would occupy the gaddi at Hazro.
- Lal Singh, he would preach the sect's tenets in the Amritsar area.
