= Satguru Uday Singh =

Spiritual leader of the Namdhari Sikhs

Sri Satguru Uday Singh Ji
- ਸ੍ਰੀ ਸਤਿਗੁਰੂ ਉਦੇ ਸਿੰਘ ਜੀ
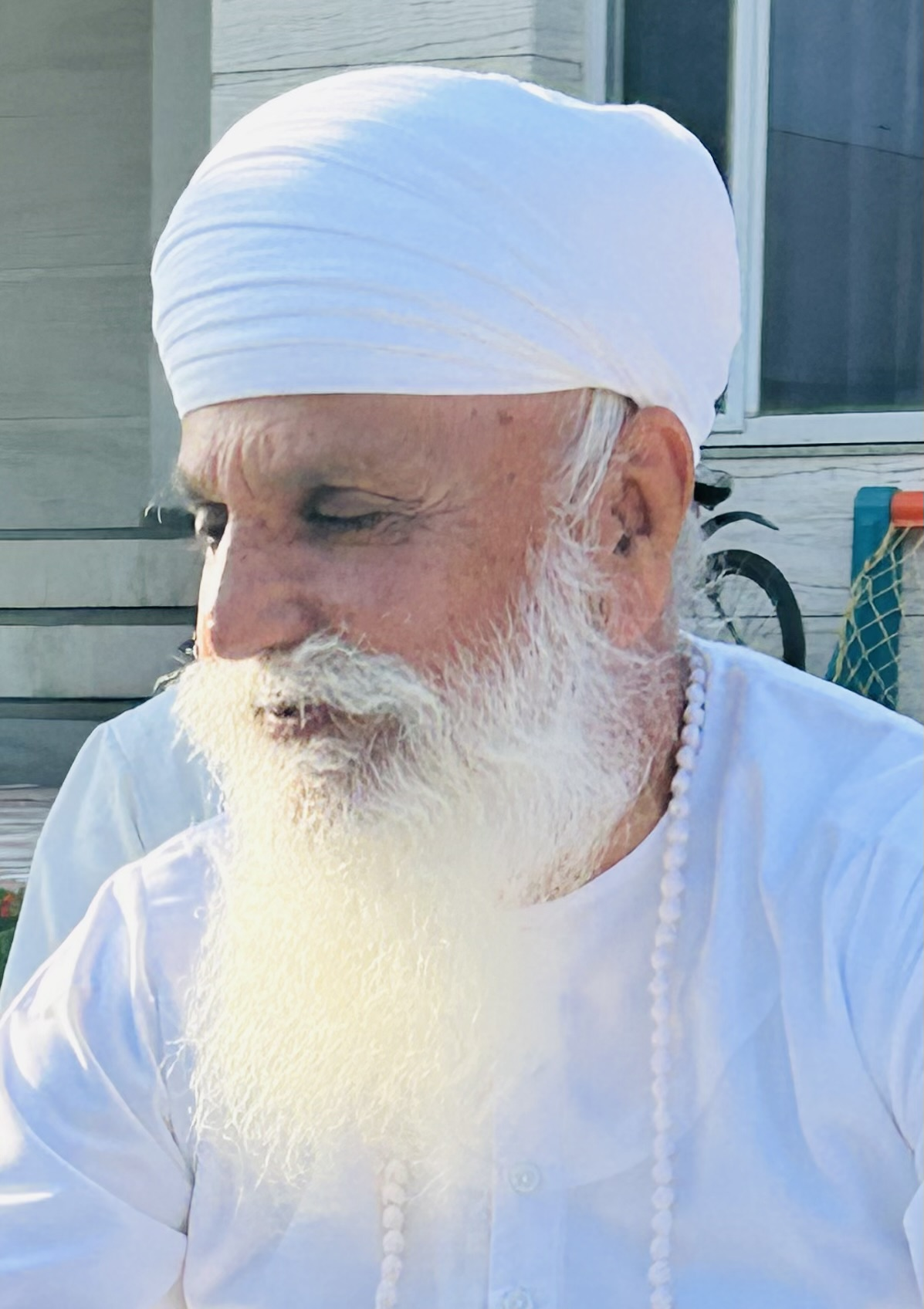
- Born: India
- Occupation: Spiritual leader of Namdhari Sikhs
- Years active: 2012–present
- Organization: Sri Bhaini Sahib
- Title: Guru of the Namdhari Sikhs
- Predecessor: Satguru Jagjit Singh
- Board member of: Chairman of Namdhari Group, Bangalore; Chairman of Satguru Partap Singh Hospital, Ludhiana

Satguru Uday Singh (Punjabi: ਸਤਿਗੁਰੂ ਉਦੇ ਸਿੰਘ) is the current spiritual head of the Namdhari Sikhs. Previously, he has been the Indian president of Asia Pacific Seed Association and President of National Seed Association of India, Director of the International Seed Federation (ISF), and Director of the Federation of Seed Industry of India (FSII). He is the chairman of Namdhari Seeds, chairman of Satguru Partap Singh Hospital and a patron of the Namdhari Hockey team.

== Early life ==
Sri Satguru Uday Singh is the nephew of the former head Satguru Jagjit Singh. Satguru Jagjit Singh himself supervised the learning of Thakur Uday Singh at the age of five years and taught him Gurmukhi alphabets. Later, he was sent to Guru Hari Singh Maha Vidyalaya (school). His music education was started with Seth Chandrahas. Later, he received music training from Ustad Piara Singh, Ustad Harbhajan Singh and Ustad Mahinder Singh. He also learnt playing of traditional stringed instrument Dilruba. Master Darshan Singh taught him recital of Sri Aadi Guru Granth Sahib and Sri Dasam Guru Granth Sahib. He showed keen interest in sports activities like horse riding, swimming, volleyball, football and especially hockey, which he played professionally as well.

== Role in developmental works ==
Anticipating population shifts post-Indo-Pak partition, Satguru Partap Singh had proactively secured a large area of barren land in Sirsa Ranian, Hissar district, to resettle Namdhari Sikhs from western Punjab. Timely efforts by Satguru Partap Singh and Satguru Jagjit Singh led to early and easier settlement of a number of people around the Jeewan Nagar and surrounding areas. Subsequently, Satguru Jagjit Singh worked especially towards the self-sufficiency of the settled people and the community in general by advancing agricultural development. He involved Satguru Uday Singh in these efforts and he was given the task of supervising new farm activities in Gola Gokaran area of Uttar Pradesh in 1977. This farm of 150 acres was inaccessible by roads, prone to water-logging and required crossing a thick forest to reach. Further, it was marked by presence of large numbers of wild animals and bandits as well. In two years, under the supervision of Satugru Uday Singh, this became a model farm and fostered further development in the surrounding areas.

In 1982, Satguru Jagjit Singh asked Satguru Uday Singh to supervise farming activities in 175 acres land in Bidadi area of Karnataka, which he had purchased in 1973. Due to a different language and previously hostile relations of Punjabi community with local Kannada people, the farm could not be developed to an appreciable extent. Additionally, the rocky soil, insufficient water availability, poor accessibility and wild plant population in large part of the farm had impeded its development and led to high expenditures. Satguru Uday Singh had to address the twin tasks of dealing with the legal issues on one hand and addressing the developmental activities on the other. Starting with cultivation of grapes and pineapple in 1985, he demonstrated the potential of the farm for the first time. With the efforts of Satguru Ji, Namdhari Seeds Private Limited is well-known for its quality produce. A venture, Namdhari Fresh, is a popular grocery store in Bangalore. The company has won many laurels, including Best Exporter Award from Agriculture & Processive Food Export Development Authority (APEDA). Various corporations have procured the produce of Namdhari Seeds to boost their export potential. Satguru Uday Singh has been the Indian president of Asia Pacific Seed Association (APSA) and President of National Seed Association of India, Director of the International Seed Federation (ISF), and Director of the Federation of Seed Industry of India (FSII). Along with others, the Indian seed companies contributed in making the nation a seed hub in Asia, ensuring institutional development for food security in the region. For his pioneering work on seed security in the region and enabling Asia Pacific Seed Association to be self-sufficient for developmental activities, Satguru Uday Singh was conferred Lifetime Achievement Award by APSA at its 30th year on 1 December 2024. The association highlighted the role played by Namdhari Seeds in promoting smallholder farmers and enabling them to be climate resilient amidst the changing climate, especially in the tropics, and mentioned that 'he has helped shape policies that continue to impact the seed industry at both regional and global levels'.

== Spiritual leadership ==
On 22 December 2012, Satguru Uday Singh assumed the leadership of the Namdhari sect following the death of Satguru Jagjit Singh. While carrying forward the practices of Naam Simran (meditation), Gurbani recital and Kirtan (devotional music), he has undertaken many initiatives during his leadership, especially involving the Namdhari youth.

=== Gurbani learning and recitals ===
Satguru Uday Singh has focused on educational initiatives to promote the correct pronunciation and understanding of Gurbani. He has been instrumental in organizing classes for youth to learn Gurbani accurately. Recognizing the need for accessible Gurbani education, Satguru Uday Singh has expanded learning opportunities both locally and globally. He has facilitated Gurbani learning through online classes and apps. He organizes special sessions where he personally listens to recitations by students.

Satguru Jagjit Singh had started the programme of 1.25 million (Sawa Lakh) recitations of Sri Guru Granth Sahib for international peace, which remained to be completed yet. By 2016, approximately 85,000 recitations had been completed, with 40,000 remaining. To accomplish this task, over 100 WhatsApp groups were created, organized by districts, cities, and villages, for Namdhari communities worldwide to monitor the progress of the recitals. Approximately 20,000 members of the sect joined these social media groups. The project coordinators provided guidance on correct pronunciation and protocol for the recitations. After 18 months of collective effort, the recitations neared completion, with the Bhogs (conclusion) of this endeavor taking place on February 3–10, 2019, at Sri Bhaini Sahib, with over 1,500 individuals participating in reciting the slokas of the 9th Mahalla during this period.

=== Centenary celebrations ===
The Namdhari community, under the guidance of Satguru Uday Singh Ji, celebrated several significant centenary events between 2013 and 2022. These included the 150th anniversary of Amrit-Daat to women (1863-2013), the 150th anniversary of Anand Karaj (1863-2013), and the 200th birth anniversary of Satguru Ram Singh Ji (1816-2016). The latter was marked by numerous events, including 200 havans, special ceremonies, and the issuance of commemorative coins by the Government of India. Other notable celebrations included the 350th birth anniversary of Sri Guru Gobind Singh Ji (1666-2016), the 550th birth anniversary of Sri Guru Nanak Dev Ji (1469-2019), and the 200th birth anniversary of Satguru Hari Singh Ji (1819-2019). The community also observed the 150th birth anniversary of Baba Sohan Singh Bhakna (1870-2020), the 100th birth anniversary of Satguru Jagjit Singh Ji (1920-2020), and the 400th birth anniversary of Sri Guru Tegh Bahadur Ji (1621-2021). These events featured religious ceremonies, scholarly lectures, cultural programs, and community gatherings, often attended by prominent religious and political figures. The celebrations also included the completion of 1.25 million recitations of Chaupai Sahib, Chandi di vaar and the continuation of the tradition of performing 1.25 million paths (readings) of Sri Guru Granth Sahib.

== Inter-faith dialogues ==
Through a series of international conferences, Satguru Uday Singh encouraged mutual respect and understanding among various religious communities. On March 9, 2023, he hosted an inter-religious conference at the Namdhari headquarters in Sri Bhaini Sahib, Ludhiana, bringing together esteemed religious leaders to promote unity. The Namdhari Sikh Sangat organized a gathering of twelve religious organizations under the theme "Religious Harmony for World Peace" in Melbourne, Australia on April 23, 2023. In UK, an Interfaith Conference under the theme “Spirituality for a Peaceful Existence” on August 26, 2023, further solidified the message of bringing together faith leaders globally to advocate for peace and cooperation.

On July 20, 2024, Satguru Uday Singh hosted the “Interfaith Insights - Building Bridges of Humanity” event in Brampton, Ontario, Canada. Over 500 attendees gathered to celebrate Canada’s diversity and engage in discussions on building bridges of understanding across different traditions. This event underlined how religious communities can foster sustainable practices in a multicultural society.

The 5th Sarab Dharam Sammelan, an inter-faith conference, was held on October 13, 2024, in Sri Bhaini Sahib, Ludhiana. The event brought together prominent figures from various religions to promote unity and global peace. Key speakers emphasized the importance of love for humanity, spiritual growth, and inter-faith cooperation. Themes discussed included the universal respect for all religions, the need to practice religious teachings sincerely, and the common goal of promoting peace and welfare. During this event, Maulana Usmani Rehamani Ludhianavi shared the deep-rooted historical relationship between the Namdhari Sikh and his community, recounting how Satguru Ram Singh Ji had once assisted his forefather, Shah Abdul Qadar, during British persecution after the 1857 Sepoy Mutiny. Maulana Rehamani also acknowledged Satguru Partap Singh’s efforts in initiating inter-faith dialogues in pre-independent India, at a time when such actions used to be under strict surveillance by the colonial government.

== Musical efforts ==
The different initiatives in music include the annual Sangeet Sammelan at Sri Bhaini Sahib, which has become a major attraction for renowned musicians and music lovers since 2013. Satguru Uday Singh has also encouraged music conferences and workshops in various locations, including international venues. Namdhari Sangeet Kala Kendra at Sri Bhaini Sahib provides music education to children, with experienced musicians as instructors, with Satguru Uday Singh personally overseeing the appointment of teachers and the development of the curriculum, ensuring that students receive high-quality musical training. In 2022, the first Satguru Jagjit Singh Shastriya Sangeet Competition was organized to encourage young talent. During the COVID-19 pandemic, online workshops were conducted to continue music education. Satguru Uday Singh has also supported the production of a documentary film about Satguru Jagjit Singh's musical journey.

== Efforts for the Punjabi language ==
Satguru Uday Singh has encouraged writers, literary organizations, and institutions working for the Punjabi language, providing them with support and motivation to continue their efforts in preserving and promoting the language. Many books have been published under his patronage. He was part of the 6th World Punjabi Conference in March 2018, which brought together prominent scholars, writers, and dignitaries to discuss the importance of Punjabi. In a unique initiative, he organized the first-ever book exhibition during the annual Hola Mohalla festival in March 2021, collaborating with the National Book Trust and various publishers to showcase Punjabi literature.

== Promotion of sports ==
In 2017, Satguru Uday Singh established the Namdhari Sports Academy with a focus on football. The academy started with trials for young players, and by 2018, it had around 60-65 children, including 45-50 from outside Bhaini Sahib and 15 from the local area. The academy provides comprehensive training, accommodation, and education for the players.

Satguru Uday Singh has ensured that the academy has top-quality coaches, including both Indian and international trainers. The academy has employed coaches from Bulgaria, Serbia, England, and Portugal, alongside experienced Indian coaches. This diverse coaching staff has helped in providing world-class training to the young players. Besides football, Satguru Uday Singh has supported the development of other sports, including Hockey, where he personally attends many of the team's matches; Badminton and Tennis coaching at Sri Bhaini sahib, a center for athletics and multi-sports facilities at Jeewan Nagar.

The government of Punjab expressed an interest in replicating the Bhaini Sahib sports model in other places in Punjab, especially in the rural hinterland, in consultation with Satguru Uday Singh.

== Environmental and social reform ==
In January 2019, Satguru Uday Singh planned restoration of the historic 'Buddha Dariya" in Ludhiana, which has been left to a mere stream of polluted water due to years of mismanagement. An event, titled “Aan Milo Daryao,” was held near the Sewerage Treatment plant on Tajpur Road and aimed to raise awareness about the pollution affecting the water body. Participants, including prominent figures such environmentalist Sant Balbir Singh Seechewal, and singer Harbhajan Mann, took an oath to undertake concrete efforts to clean the river. Seechewal emphasized the moral obligation to protect nature, stating, “Nature is God, and it is our duty to safeguard it.” Organizers reported positive support from the public, administration, and local industries, expressing their commitment to ongoing efforts to revitalize Buddha Nullah and promote awareness in educational institutions. However, given the slow pace of the project, Satguru Uday Singh, who had earlier been appointed as the Chairperson of the Buddha Nullah Special Task Force, resigned from the chairpersonship and asked the Chief Minister to ensure practical progress for the success of the project.

Focusing on providing livelihood security in disadvantaged areas a new project on “Promotion of Rural Women Self Help Group Through Dairy Development” was launched by PNASF, Bangalore on March 31, 2007 in which Satguru Uday Singh was present amongst other dignitaries. In 2018, he inaugurated a new old age home in Patiala. A large-capacity old age home is being run at Sri Bhaini Sahib also.

In 2020 he encouraged Indians to remain at home and get vaccination amidst the COVID-19 pandemic.

== Controversy ==
=== Succession crisis ===
In 2012, after the death of Satguru Jagjit Singh, there was controversy surrounding who would succeed him as the next Guru. Thakur Uday Singh (nephew of Satguru Jagjit Singh) was announced as the successor. The other faction vying for Thakur Dalip Singh (excommunicated elder brother of Satguru Uday Singh) opposed this. There have been violent clashes between the two factions at different occasions. Satguru Uday Singh was attacked by a person during August 2013 in England, motivated by religious hatred. In 2014, Thakur Dalip Singh was questioned for alleged involvement in a murder case. On 25 December 2015, a bomb exploded in a car, being carried to a spot to target Satguru Uday Singh. Later, Mata Chand Kaur was assassinated in April 2016. Police hinted at the role of foreign elements behind the assassination, and implicated its link with a series of other incidents that were happening in Punjab around that time. In 2016, Satguru Uday Singh was given permission to bullet proof three of his cars and was accorded Z-plus security from the Indian government after the murder of Mata Chand Kaur and a bomb blast in Jalandhar. The links of the attempted murder in the car bomb case of 2015 led to questioning of Thakur Dalip Singh by Central Bureau of investigation, India. In 2019, CBI arrested the former driver of Thakur Dalip Singh in connection with the assassination of Mata Chand Kaur. Thakur Dalip Singh was reported to have joined investigation on 24 August 2018, but left India without intimation to the investigating agency and without obtaining permission from any competent court/agency to leave the country. CBI issued non-bailable warrants against Thakur Dalip Singh. On 11–12 August 2024, another violent clash happened between the supporters of the two factions in Sirsa district. The Punjab and Haryana High court denied bail to the prime accused belonging to Thakur Dalip Singh faction in this case, citing negative societal impact.

=== Murder attempt ===
He was attacked by a person during August 2013 at the Gurdwara Namdhari Temple in England who claimed of sexual abuse in the mid-1990's. It was denied by him and the reason invalidated by Birmingham Crown Court finding the attack to be an assassination attempt.
