= Satguru Hari Singh =

Spiritual leader of the Namdhari Sikhs

Personal life
- Born: 1819 Raian, Punjab
- Died: 1906 (aged 86–87)
- Spouse: Mata Jeewan Kaur and Mata Fateh Kaur
- Children: Satguru Partap Singh, Maharaj Nihal Singh and Maharaj Gurdial Singh
- Parent(s): Pita Jassa Singh and Mata Sada Kaur
- Known for: Sustaining the Namdhari movement amidst severe colonial government oppression

Religious life
- Religion: Namdhari Sikhi

Senior posting
- Predecessor: Satguru Ram Singh
- Successor: Satguru Pratap Singh

Satguru Hari Singh (1819–1906) was the younger brother of Satguru Ram Singh. Following the deportation of his elder brother, Satguru Hari Singh took on the monumental task of sustaining the Namdhari (Kuka) movement amidst severe colonial government oppression. The colonial British authorities imposed harsh restrictions on the Namdhari Sikhs, declaring them rebels and severely limiting their movements and gatherings. Despite these challenges, Satguru Hari Singh persevered in maintaining both the freedom struggle and religious practices of the Namdhari Sikhs.

== Early life ==
Satguru Hari Singh's earlier name was Budh Singh. Born in 1820, he was four years younger than Satguru Ram Singh. Both Satguru Ram Singh and Satguru Hari Singh received informal education in Gurmukhi at home from their mother Mata Sada Kaur. Later, they started assisting their father Jassa Singh. While Satguru Ram Singh joined the Khalsa army of Maharaja Ranjit Singh at 20 years of age, Satguru Hari Singh remained at home and engaged in tool-making and some farm activities. He took care of all the family matters.

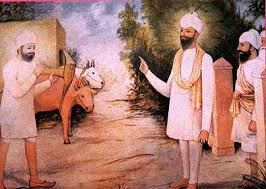
Satguru Ram Singh instructing Bhai Budh Singh (Satguru Hari Singh) to leave all other work and concentrate more on management of Namdhari movement

When Satguru Ram Singh came back from army and started the Namdhari movement in 1857 to oppose colonialism, he had deliberately kept Bhai Budh Singh (later Satguru Hari Singh) away from major activities till 1871. Because of this, Bhai Budh Singh was not subject to rigorous surveillance of the colonial government, to which Satguru Ram Singh and other well-known, prominent Namdhari Sikhs were. Six months prior to exile, Satguru Ram Singh instructed Bhai Budh Singh to leave all other work and concentrate more on the management of Namdhari movement. From then onwards, Bhai Budh Singh started spending most of his time in management of the Gurudwara activities.

== Aftermath of 1872 Malerkotla incident ==
Following the Malerkotla incident in 1872, where 66 Namdhari Sikhs were executed by cannon fire by British authorities, the colonial government imposed severe restrictions on the Namdhari Sikh community. This execution was a response to a violent confrontation between Namdhari Sikhs and those Malerkotla officials and populace which indulged in public cow slaughter, an act deeply offensive to the Sikhs. In the aftermath of this event, known as the Malerkotla Saka (massacre), Satguru Ram Singh, the leader of the Namdharis, was exiled. The British government, viewing the Namdharis as a threat, implemented a series of harsh measures to control and suppress the movement, which included labeling of the entire Namdhari community was labeled as rebels, permission from village headmen now required for Namdhari Sikhs to leave their villages, gatherings of more than five Namdhari Sikhs being prohibited. Other restrictions included establishment of a strong police post was established at the main gate of Satguru Hari Singh Ji's residence in Sri Bhaini Sahib, entry to Sri Bhaini Sahib being restricted to only five Namdhari Sikhs at a time and the Gurdwara Bhaini Sahib being subjected to multiple raids and excavations by government forces.

== Spiritual leadership ==
The restrictions severely limited the Namdhari Sikhs' ability to practice their faith, communicate with each other and continue their religious and social activities. The measures were designed to curb any potential anti-government activities and to weaken the Namdhari movement. The Punjab District Gazetteer (Ludhiana District and Malerkotla State) 1904 mentioned the situation of Namdhari Sikhs as 'It is not to be expected then that any man, unless he were prepared to break with society and give his enemies a constant hold on him, would admit that he belonged to the sect..'. Despite these challenges, the Namdhari Sikhs, under the leadership of Satguru Hari Singh, continued to maintain their religious practices and their struggle for independence, albeit under much more difficult circumstances.

Satguru Hari Singh's leadership was characterized by his unwavering commitment to the Namdhari cause. His spiritual authority was confirmed through a Hukumnama (commandment) from Satguru Ram Singh, which bestowed upon him the name "Hari Singh" and vested him with full authority.

== Sustenance of Namdhari movement ==
Throughout his 34-year leadership, Satguru Hari Singh faced constant police surveillance and restrictions. He was not allowed to leave Sri Bhaini Sahib without prior permission, and even then only for specific occasions and short periods. The Gurdwara Bhaini Sahib was raided multiple times by the government, and entry to Sri Bhaini Sahib was restricted to only five Namdhari Sikhs at a time. Despite these formidable challenges, Satguru Hari Singh managed to sustain the Namdhari movement, preserve their religious and cultural heritage, and continue the struggle for independence.

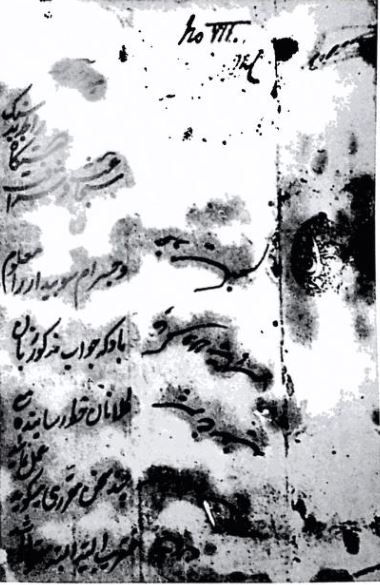
Photocopy of remains of letter from Russian authorities, addressed to Satguru Hari Singh

Under Satguru Hari Singh's guidance, several important activities were undertaken. These included developing the headquarters at Sri Bhaini Sahib, maintaining the Langar (community kitchen) without interruption, encouraging Namdhari Sikhs to remain optimistic, propagating Sikh teachings and preserving cultural heritage, and continuing the struggle for independence and against cow slaughter. Satguru Hari Singh initiated the practice of Akhand Paths (continuous recitations of the Sri Adi Guru Granth Sahib) despite government restrictions. He got completed numerous such recitations, which became a regular feature of Namdhari practice and continues till today.

It was under the guidance of Satguru Hari Singh that a tripartite covert communication link was established between the Russian authorities in Samarkand with Satguru Ram Singh in Rangoon through Satguru Hari Singh in Sri Bhaini Sahib. Baba Gurcharan Singh and Suba Bishan had travelled to Central Asia to establish these contacts. The Kuka efforts for Russian aid were primarily motivated by the desire to utilize Russian military might to expel the British from India. Fauja Singh mentions that these communications with Russia should be understood in the context of Anglo-Russian relations of the time, with Russia seen as a potential ally against British imperialism. Though these contacts were successfully established, the foreign help to drive out the British imperialists did not materialize due to multiplicity of factors, including geopolitical developments and in some cases, the fear of consolidated British power, which had a large number of native sepoys and other resources at its disposal.

In a report submitted by J.P. Warburton in 1896, Kuka movement was described as 'from the beginning manifestly directed against the existing (referring to British) Government', while tracing its origins to Satguru Ram Singh and mentioning that under the supervision of Budh Singh, 'the inflammable material (referring to anti-colonial feelings) exists in abundance and needs only a spark to ignite it'.

True-copy of a report of the revival of the Kuka movement, by J. P. Warburton, Lahore, 11 November 1896

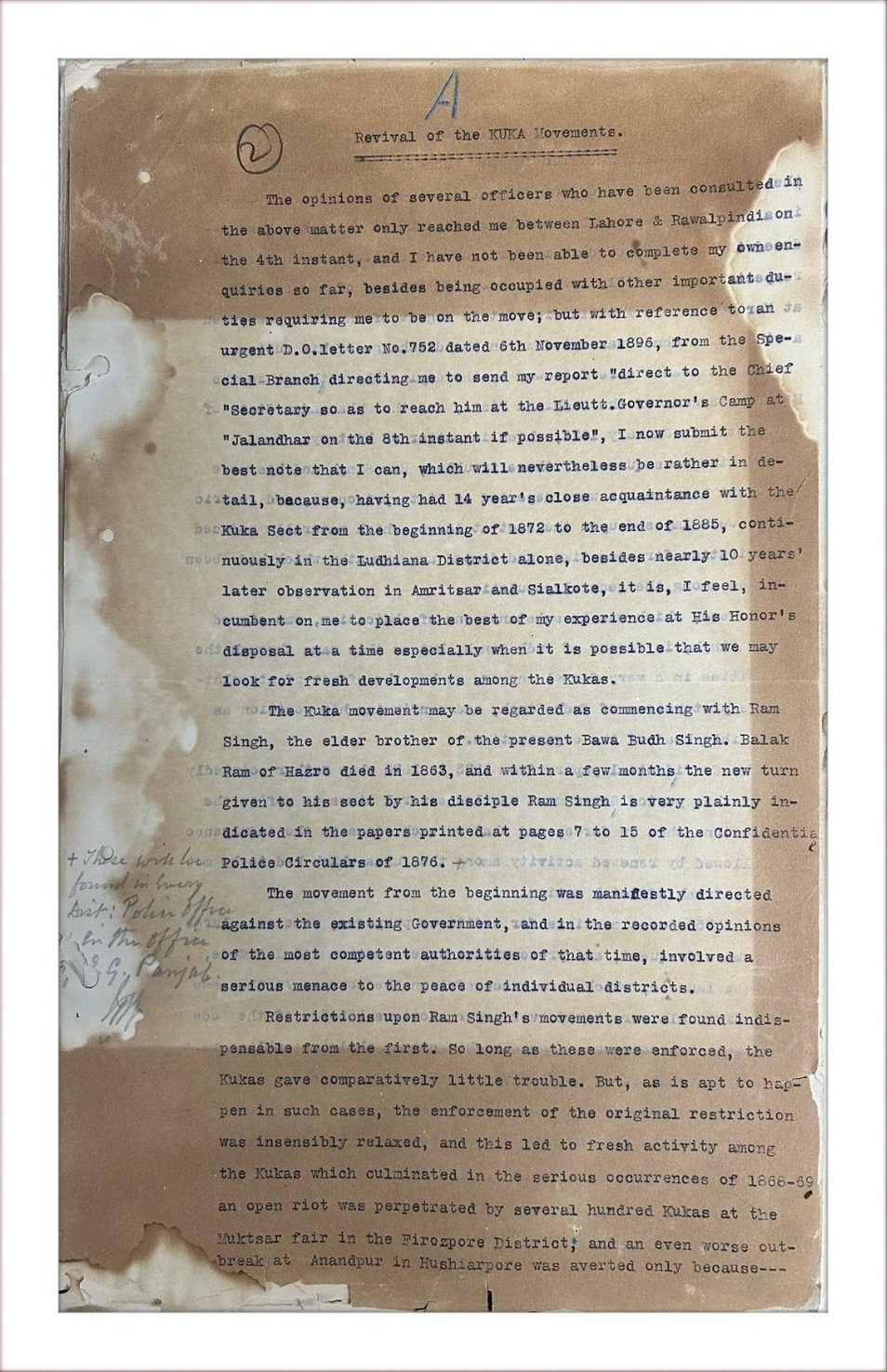

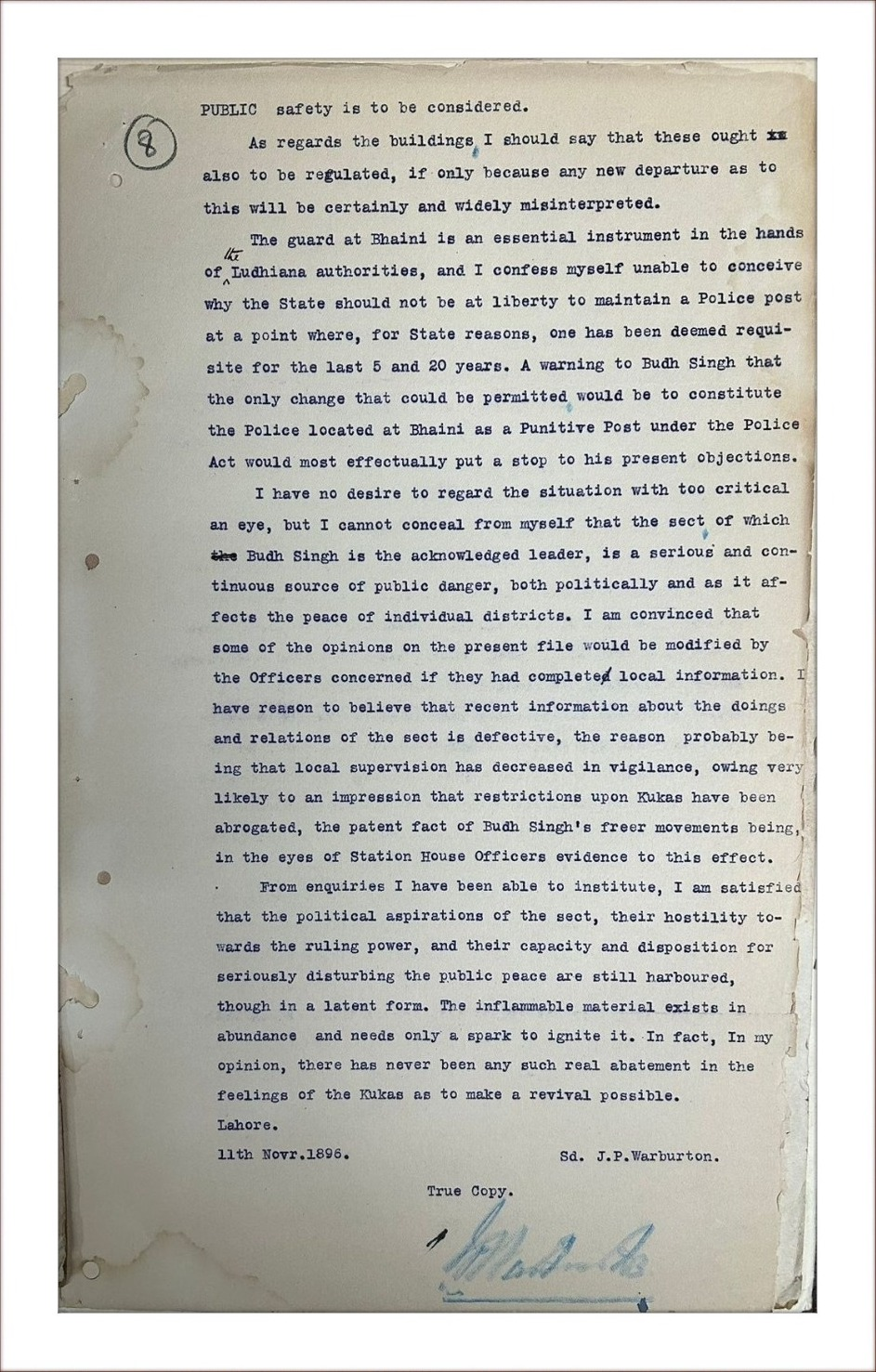

== Community service ==
At Sri Bhaini Sahib, Satguru Hari Singh extended the free langar (community kitchen) to serve the famine-stricken population. This initiative was not limited to feeding people alone; he also provided sustenance for their cattle, recognizing the importance of livestock in rural livelihoods. The scale of this effort was remarkable, with more than 6,000 people receiving free meals daily at the height of the crisis. This showcased Satguru Hari Singh's deep commitment to serving humanity, especially in times of dire need. The magnitude of Satguru Hari Singh's humanitarian work during the famine was noted by the Commissioner of Ludhiana, who impressed with this service, offered to donate 2,500 acres of land to Gurudwara Sri Bhaini Sahib for the continuation of the langar. Satguru Hari Singh replied, "By giving 2500 acres from our country, you want to emphasize that the rest of country is yours? This entire country is ours, and we will take it back as a whole from you." This refusal of the then colonial government patronage exemplified the steadfast resolve of Namdhari Sikhs in their struggle for freedom. In 1904, the colonial government noted in its gazette that "it is not possible for a Kuka to be loyal subject of the British Government...".

== Legacy ==
Satguru Hari Singh is known in Namdhari Sikhi as the "one who united the 'separated ones'". The colonial persecution of the Namdhari Sikhs was intense. As a result, the sect suffered a major blow. However, with the efforts of Satguru Hari Singh, the Namdhari movement kept its programme of anti-colonialism. Satguru Hari Singh guided the sect till 17 May 1906, after which, his elder son, Satguru Partap Singh assumed the leadership of the community.
